= Stripped (film) =

2014 documentary film

- Bill Watterson created the poster for Stripped.
- Directed by: Dave Kellett; Frederick Schroeder
- Written by: Dave Kellett; Frederick Schroeder
- Produced by: Dave Kellett; Frederick Schroeder; Chris Countryman
- Cinematography: Frederick Schroeder
- Edited by: Ben Waters
- Music by: Stefan Lessard
- Production company: Sequential Films
- Release date: April 1, 2014 (iTunes Store)
- Running time: 85 minutes
- Language: English

Stripped is a 2014 documentary film about comic strips and their transition from the failing newspaper industry to the web. Work on Stripped began in 2010. The film's original concept was to make a documentary about cartoonists in their studios.

Stripped features interviews with over 70 comic creators, who discuss their trade and its prospects in the 21st century. Interviewee Bill Watterson created the poster for Stripped, his first published art since ending Calvin and Hobbes in 1995. The film was crowdfunded through Kickstarter, and was released on the iTunes Store on April 1, 2014.

== Interviewees ==
- Jean Schulz, widow of Charles M. Schulz (Peanuts, 1950–2000)
- Mort Walker (Beetle Bailey, 1950–)
- Jeff Keane (The Family Circus, 1960–)
- Cathy Guisewite (Cathy, 1976–2010)
- Jim Davis (Garfield, 1978–)
- Bill Watterson (Calvin and Hobbes, 1985–1995)
- Greg Evans (Luann, 1985–)
- Bill Amend (FoxTrot, 1988–)
- Jerry Holkins (Penny Arcade, 1998–)
- Mike Krahulik (Penny Arcade, 1998–)
- Jeph Jacques (Questionable Content, 2003–)
- Richard Thompson (Cul de Sac, 2004–2012)
- Karl Kerschl (The Abominable Charles Christopher, 2007–)
- Kate Beaton (Hark! A Vagrant, 2008–)
- Matthew Inman (The Oatmeal, 2009–)
