= Sheldon (webcomic) =

Webcomic by Dave Kellett

- Author: Dave Kellett
- Website: SheldonComics.com
- Current status/schedule: Approximately twice a week
- Launch date: Some time in fall of 1998 (Limited link to early archives)

Sheldon is a comedy webcomic created by Dave Kellett. It centers on the odd family unit of 10-year-old Sheldon, his grandfather guardian and his talking duck, Arthur. Much humour is character-based, often joking at traits such as Sheldon's geekiness, Gramp's old age or Arthur's over-inflated ego. Kellett's other webcomic, Drive, had appeared on the Sheldon site each Saturday, before moving to a site of its own.

== Overview ==
Sheldon is based on light character-based humor. Pop-culture references are frequent. The comic consists of a mixture of short story arcs and stand-alone strips which varying in size and format. The strip employs breaking of the fourth wall on occasion with characters speaking "to camera". Often the standalone jokes will not feature any of the strip's characters, featuring instead generic characters, and/or persons and characers from popular culture and real life.

== Characters ==
Sheldon: is a smart and geeky ten-year-old kid. In early years of the comic Sheldon was a genius billionaire having founded with his own software company: Sheldonsoft. A running joke in the strip was that Sheldon would often forget about his company, preferring to concern himself with more everyday affairs. Over time, references to this aspect of his character diminished, with modern strips omitting it altogether, depicting Sheldon as an ordinary (if extremely nerdy) ten-year-old boy.

Gramp: Sheldon is raised by his grandfather, Gramp, an older man who's not sure what to make of his grandson's billions. Now retired, Gramp tries to keep up with the modern world. He also struggles with a coffee addiction. His real first name (revealed in the October 29th, 2012 strip) is Seamus.

Arthur: A duck who learned to talk when Sheldon downloaded an encyclopedia and some speech-recognition software into his head. Sarcastic and cocky, Arthur is constantly getting into trouble at home and at the Sheldonsoft offices. Unlike Sheldon, he's captivated with the Sheldonsoft billions, and constantly has visions of shopping sprees at The Sharper Image. Some of Arthur's alter-egos include "The Duck", a superhero, and "Rex Chestington", a pug-riding cowboy. In daily life, Arthur is often found sitting on lampshades for no other reason than to keep his ducky behind warm. It is known throughout the strip that Arthur has a deep hatred for chickens, and a strong desire for pancakes, Shakira, Jessica Simpson, and Catherine Zeta-Jones.

The strip also features a small collection of supporting characters, the principal four which are:

Flaco: Thinking he was hatching an abandoned duck egg, Arthur became father to Flaco, a common North American lizard. Most storylines have him playing second-fiddle to his duck "father", but in one extended plotline, he became a Hollywood producer for CSI. He has also won the Pentathlon in the Olympics, earned a Mexican pilot's license, gone to space as a cosmonaut from Baikonur, and dated Betty White in São Paulo. Flaco speaks in a characteristic "squee" sound, which only Arthur can understand (other characters have described Flaco's voice as "...a series of high-pitched helium balloons").

Oso is Sheldon's pet pug, a whirlwind of energy. Oso was given to Sheldon as a Christmas present in 2005. Oso is mostly shown running around in circles, constantly barking (or, as it is termed in the strip, "hyping"), and acting as "Rex Chestington's" horse.

Dante is one of Sheldon's human friends, an aspiring artist. Seen extensively in the earlier days of the strip, Dante now only makes occasional appearances. He enjoys hanging out with Sheldon and doing regular 10-year-old-kid stuff (as much as that's possible when your best friend is one of the biggest, most successful nerds on the planet). The two have done everything from making sandcastles to playing superheroes and villains to re-enacting the British battle with the Spanish Armada. In one comic, it is shown that he is lactose intolerant.

Emily moved into their neighborhood during 2011. She is obsessed with theater and often quotes the works of Shakespeare throughout several appearances. Though she enjoys stage acting Emily reluctantly admits that stage work is "the worst kind of job to endure." Her pet cat, Li'l Butter, appears in several other comics- frequently in danger due to his sheer stupidity.

== Books / Book reviews ==
Cartoon compilations published to date

- Still Got It: The Seventh Sheldon Collection ISBN 978-0-9655060-9-0
- Living Dangerously With Saturated Fats: The Sixth Sheldon Collection ISBN 978-0-9655060-8-3
- Nerds On Parade: The Fifth Sheldon Collection ISBN 978-0-9655060-7-6
- Pugs: God's Little Weirdos ISBN 978-0-9655060-6-9
- A Blizzard of Lizards: The Fourth Sheldon Collection ISBN 978-0-9655060-5-2
- 62% More Awesome: The Third Sheldon Collection
- The Good, The Bad & The Pugly: The Second Sheldon Collection ISBN 978-0-9655060-3-8
- Pure Ducky Goodness: The First Sheldon Collection ISBN 0-9655060-1-0
- A Well Balanced Meal: The Very Best of: Four Food Groups of the Apocalypse ISBN 0-9655060-0-2

Book reviews

- Syracuse Post-Standard
- Syracuse Post-Standard
- Notre Dame Magazine
- Fleen.com
- Websnark.com

== Awards ==
In 2016, Sheldon won a Reuben Award in the "Online Comics - Short Form" category.

== Media appearances ==
Articles / interviews

- London Daily Telegraph
- Houston Chronicle
- Wizard
- Fleen, part 1, part 2, and part 3.
- The Costco Connection
- UCSD Guardian
- Andertoons.com
- Phi Kappa Phi Forum

== History ==
The character Sheldon first appeared in a minor role in Kellett's comic strip Four Food Groups of the Apocalypse, which ran in the University of Notre Dame's student newspaper The Observer from 1993 to 1996. Kellett later gave Sheldon his own strip in 1998 as a webcomic, which ran on djk3.ac.uk first, then davekellett.com, and then moved to the Keenspot-hosted sheldoncomics.com in 2000. In 2001, United Features Syndicate picked the strip up for online syndication and the strip moved to comics.com on December 17, 2001. Since this move meant having all-new readers, the strip was retconned with revised versions of Keenspot comics.

The strip originally ran Monday through Friday. After the move from Keenspot to comics.com, the strip ran Monday to Saturday, until late 2004, when a Sunday feature was added.

On June 22, 2005, Sheldon also joined Blank Label Comics, an online co-op of nine cartoonists.

On November 6, 2006, Kellett moved the strip from comics.com to the independently hosted sheldoncomics.com where it ran seven days a week. According to blog entry from Nov. 11, 2006, the new site logged 2.5 million pageviews in the first five days of operation.

On November 1, 2007, Kellett left Blank Label Comics and joined with Scott Kurtz of PvP, Kris Straub of Starslip Crisis, and Brad Guigar of Evil Inc. to form a new webcomics collective, Halfpixel.com.

In 2009 Kellett started a new, sci-fi motivated comic titled 'Drive' (updated on Thursdays) and since approximately the same time reduced the update schedule of Sheldon to five comics a week, Monday through Friday.
