= PvP (webcomic) =

Video game webcomic

- Author(s): Scott Kurtz, Dylan Meconis
- Website: www.toonhoundstudios.com/pvp/
- Current status/schedule: Offline
- Launch date: May 4, 1998
- Genre(s): Video games, fantasy, geek culture

PvP, also known as Player vs Player, was an American video game webcomic, written and drawn by Scott Kurtz. It was launched on May 4, 1998. The webcomic followed the events at a fictional video game magazine company, featuring many running gags and references with a focus on nerd culture. Dylan Meconis was added as a co-writer in 2013.

By 2005, PvP was receiving around 100,000 unique visitors per day, and the webcomic has seen various print releases. On February 1, 2007, it became the subject of its own animated series.

In 2020, the strip was rebooted, jumping forward in time 15 years, though it later reverted to the original time period.

On February 2, 2022, Kurtz announced on his blog that he was temporarily dialing back his daily work on PvP to concentrate on an upcoming book series based on Table |Titans.

There have been no new comics since September 16, 2022, when Kurtz locked all comics predating 2021 to Patreon subscribers only. On October 24, 2024, Kurtz removed the Patreon login requirements for reading the PvP and Table Titans archives. As of July 2026, pvponline was officially shut down, with the archives no longer being available As of September 2026, the pvponline.com domain is serving an AI-generated cybersquatter site and malicious drive-by downloads.

== Themes ==
The comic chronicles the adventures of a fictional video game magazine company (later to become a video game publisher) and its employees. It features many running gags that are actually references to running gags from other media (television programs, films, games, cartoons, etc.). A popular but often controversial figure in the field of online comics, Kurtz is usually willing to share his opinions about comics and gaming culture in his blog, which is hosted on the same website as his comic strips.

Originally, PvP focused on video gaming and the larger "nerd culture" including comics and RPGs. 1UP.com described it as one of the first game-based comics, but not the original, saying, "neither Scott Kurtz's PvP nor Jerry Holkins and Michael Krahulik's Penny Arcade were the first gaming-themed webcomic on the Internet." Over the years, the humor has broadened to include technology jokes, relationship humor, in-jokes about and mocking of the generation gaps between the different characters, with gaming increasingly taking a back seat. Kurtz occasionally comes under fire for his satire. Sometimes Kurtz will speak of his father's open disdain for the strip.

In 2013, Kurtz created a spin-off comic Table Titans. It features the characters Andrew, Alan, and Valerie (who have appeared in PvP comics), and chronicles their adventures while playing Dungeons & Dragons. Kurtz wanted to write fantasy comic that "captured the spirit and joy of tabletop roleplaying." Kurtz collaborated with Wizards of the Coast as a marketing partnership to run Table Titans, and Steve Hamaker was brought on to color some of the comics. Season 4 of Table Titans was drawn by Brian Hurtt, and Tavis Maiden also worked on a project in the Table Titans universe.

== Characters ==
Cole and Brent in one of several Dukes of Hazzard scenes

=== Cole Richards ===
The boss. Friends with Brent since high school, Cole started PVP magazine as the business manager with Brent responsible for the creative and graphical content. A committed family man, he has a rather loose grasp of new technology and is often nostalgic for 1980s pop culture. Cole is (relatively speaking) the straight man of the group and the one most likely to insist on actually making the magazine, though is not above joining the others' schemes. He is also insecure about his position in the magazine, he has expressed fear of becoming unnecessary.

Cole had a longstanding "rivalry" with Max Powers who ran Powerplay Games (formerly Powerplay Magazine); in reality Max has never done anything to Cole, but Cole was extremely jealous of Max's success. Cole for a brief time was forced to merge the two companies when he could no longer afford to run the magazine on his own. However, when Cole came into a large sum of money from the World Wildlife Fund to house the giant panda that lives in the PvP offices (which attacks Brent throughout the series), he bought out Max's side of the partnership. Cole spent much of the series run married to Donna, though mentions having problems with his marriage in 2008. This ended some time later with a divorce which he refers to in 2011, although it is not covered by the strip.

=== Brent Sienna ===
Creative director of the magazine, Brent's name was originally inspired by the Crayola crayon color "Burnt Sienna." His full name is Brently Irving Sienna. Brent is a pompous, sarcastic, cynical intellectual snob, with a fanatical devotion to Apple Computer products. He drives a Mini Cooper as a "statement" and drinks Starbucks coffee, which he admits he drinks because it makes him cool. Brent tried unsuccessfully to give up coffee in a story arc during early 2005.

A running gag in the strip is that whenever the words "Panda," "Panda Attack," or "Giant Panda" or any variation thereof are spoken, Brent is immediately mauled by the Giant Panda that lives in the walls of the PvP offices. Brent got revenge in the August 6, 2005 strip when he mauled the panda in a parallel universe.

Brent virtually always wore sunglasses in the strip—going so far as to pick up a loaner set of sunglasses while his were "in the shop"—although later strips show Brent's eyes over the tops of his sunglasses. Brent claims he wore the shades because any woman that looks in his eyes falls in love with him. Constantly wearing sunglasses made Brent's eyes extremely sensitive to sunlight – after removing his sunglasses at his wedding, he was (temporarily) blinded. Eventually Brent stopped wearing his sunglasses altogether, after years of wearing them began to negatively affect his eyesight. Instead he exchanged his shades for regular prescription glasses. However, after realizing that he was losing his cool factor, Jade has allowed him to occasionally wear his sunglasses again.

Brent is an avid consumer of Apple computers and products. He refuses to use PCs and considers Microsoft to be evil, even forbidding the use of PCs in his house. He is a founding member of an Apple fanatics group called The Honorable Order of Macintosh Operators (or H.O.M.O. – the name is a running gag in the strip).

Although Brent is not a gamer, unlike the rest of the staff, he does occasionally play World of Warcraft with H.O.M.O. (as well as with Jade), and played City of Heroes with Cole, Francis, and Skull as part of the City of Heroes special edition comic packed with the game, as well as its counterpart, City of Villains in a later strip seen on the site, but neither game has been referenced beyond those strips. Before he discovered Apple, Brent was a closet Amiga fanatic.

Brent married his longtime girlfriend and co-worker Jade in a lavish ceremony marking the strip's ten-year anniversary. The two began dating after Jade found out that Francis was pretending to be a woman named "Sasha" while chatting online with Brent. Jade found out about it and decided to take over as "Sasha" to let Brent down easy, but eventually fell in love with him. Brent proposed at San Diego Comic-Con after a convoluted scheme whereby some stormtroopers "kidnapped" Jade and had her dress up as Princess Leia. Brent "rescued" her, dressed as Han Solo.

=== Jade Sienna ===
A columnist, and Brent's wife. She plays MMORPG-style games such as EverQuest and World of Warcraft, and also chats online with friends she's made in the series.

Along with Cole, Jade often plays the straight-man of the group and is often the voice of reason compared to the rest of the cast. However, she was not always the good and moral figure that she appears to be. In high school, she and her friend Sam were caught stealing the answers to their chemistry final. Jade also took her stepfather's car without permission, and was subsequently charged with robbery by her stepfather in order to teach her a lesson. Brent and Francis were delighted to learn this, since they tend to be the ones whose antics cause Jade to roll her eyes in contempt. Jade attempted to return to her old deviant ways after this revelation, but realized she didn't enjoy it as much as she once did.

Although considered a feminist, Jade's desire to be treated as an equal often comes into conflict with her natural maternal caregiver personality. She temporarily left PvP after Francis grabbed her breast, opening her own pro-woman gaming magazine called "Valkyrie". Later Valkyrie merged to PvP because Jade missed her PvP-family and had problems with her workers.

Jade is often criticized for being "unrealistic", although Kurtz states that she is somewhat modeled after his wife. (Note: "Archived copy". Archived from the original on January 25, 2007.) In her first posting to the PvP blog, Angela Kurtz stated, "90% of the time, when you’re reading Jade, you’re reading about Scott’s feminine side, not about me." (Note: "Archived copy". Archived from the original on November 4, 2006.)

Although Jade and Brent dated since nearly the start of the series, they broke up for nearly a year, due to a combination of Jade's obsession with Dark age of Camelot, and her catching Brent dancing with the wife of another Dark age of Camelot player in Las Vegas. Although they both continued to work at PVP, they were often seen bickering and attempting to one-up each other. Jade ended up falling in love soon after with another gamer she met on another MMORPG, named Xavier. She flew out to Las Vegas to meet Xavier in person, but began to feel reluctance and guilt returning to the place where she and Brent broke up. It was then revealed that Xavier had been Brent all along, and the two rekindled their relationship, eventually marrying in 2008. In 2014, she gave birth to her and Brent's daughter, Katherine Miranda Fontaine Sienna.

=== Francis Ottoman ===
The youngest member of the staff. Technical support for the office (and also known to write the occasional review), Francis is immature, easily excitable and always eager to be on the cutting edge of fads and technology. He loves his PC and routinely argues with Brent over Macs. He rarely shows interest in anything besides computers or video games, though it has been stated that he owns a prominent collection of pony figurines.

Francis is a skilled programmer, he has on different occasions made both a robot girlfriend and a robot of himself. The girlfriend-bot eventually malfunctions when he tells it that he grabbed Jade's boob, and eventually tries to destroy her. Using the leftover parts, he makes a robot of himself, nicknamed the Francis-bot. He uses this to wait in line for tickets for Star Wars Episode 3, which comes out three years from the beginning of the story. However, when Francis returns to get his tickets, he discovers that the robot has been waiting outside of an antique mall for a year. The robot kidnaps Francis and chains him to the mall while taking his position as the real person back at PvP. The others discover him after the robot dies from a saliva overdose after kissing Marcy. Both of these times, Francis has thought the thing it was doing was more impressive building and coding, which allowed both robots to have some semblance of artificial intelligence.

Francis' appearance in the comic has gone through more changes than the other characters. His first artwork was choppy and caused reader confusion due to readers mistaking a spot for his mouth and his mouth for a "jagged chin" or part of his hair, so his design was drastically changed later. For a long time he sported a T-shirt depicting a human skull, and messed-up moussed hair (the mousse was originally, and may still be, Skull's phlegm).

Due to his consummation of his relationship with Marcy as "predicted" in a previous comic strip, in 2008, he "leveled up", aging three years and developing chin scruff. In 2011, Francis "leveled up" again due to the company leaving Dallas for Seattle (mirroring the real life move of Scott Kurtz) and Francis being pushed into living on his own as an adult. (Note: PvP - All Grown 1UP January 13, 2011) Later that year, Francis said that Marcy broke up with him via text message after she had left for Savannah College of Art and Design. (Note: PVP - Bring a Pencil February 2, 2011) They reconciled after Marcy rejoins the PvP staff. After a gaming tournament in Las Vegas the two went out on a drinking spree and, while very drunk, got married. Despite initial misgivings about the relationship, Francis and Marcy have stayed together and are apparently happy.

Francis has a running gag with Cole in which they high five each other using whatever they are holding. This usually ends up in a mess with coffee, fries or blood all over the place.

=== Skull the Troll ===
A lovable troll who is assigned to be a mythological animal friend to Brent. Nervous and childlike, he had an occasional girlfriend named Sonya, although Skull was exposed to be female in an early comic. This was later revealed to be a joke, and Skull is typically portrayed as genderless. Brent and Francis do their best to figure out which gender he really is (on one occasion watching his reaction to a lingerie magazine they had left for him to find. Skull first acts like a typical male, whistling at the pictures, then wondered to himself if they had a piece in his size and color), though Skull has implied on many occasions that he is definitely male.

Skull debuted in another of Kurtz's web cartoons called Tales by Tavernlight, which focused on the world of Ultima Online. Though he seems to be an utterly harmless, rather clueless and childish creature who doesn't even seem to understand the nature of violence, Skull has a dark underside that the other characters sometimes see but blame on outside forces. He has actually threatened to eat Francis, and doesn't always take Brent's abuse—not to mention his epic battle with the crazed Emperor Blue.

The comic's cast page states that, as a mythological creature, Skull's only real need is attention. The middle name "Theodore" was recently revealed to be the long form for "the" (as "Skull The Troll"). Skull was reassigned when Brent finally got married, much to Brent's dissatisfaction. His first assignment was a boy named Kevin with a somewhat sadistic streak, who lived near U.S. Route 422 in western Pennsylvania, at least until his death due to a reckless wagon ride after four days (reader time) with Skull. Since then, Skull has attempted to befriend parodies of the children in The Family Circus, who believed him to be a demon and tried to kill him. This escapade ended when Skull was rescued by Jason Fox. Thanks to Scratch and Shecky he returned to PvP and has apparently "retired" from his "mentoring" duties. He does have a new girlfriend named Val, or Valerie. She was introduced during a Magic: The Gathering session, where she almost immediately tried to kill Skull. After the fight stopped, they became a couple. Even though she sees herself as a dwarven hammermaid who is supposed to hate trolls, she still feels deep affection for him.

=== Max Powers ===
Arch-enemy and rival publisher of Cole, Max Powers ran Powerplay magazine. While seemingly jovial and outgoing, for some reason Max was generally despised by the PvP crew. While perhaps not as truly evil as Brent and Cole claim, he could doubtlessly be quite annoying. Eric Burns of the webcomic review site Websnark wrote an analysis of Max suggesting that he is actually "the good guy" of PVP. Burns points out that nothing Max does can be nailed down as overtly malicious. (For example, he threatens to post a naked picture of Jade on the Internet unless she goes out with him, but it turns out to be a baby picture. He tells Cole about upcoming software audits, but doesn't actually report Cole to the authorities.) In the December 2, 2008 comic, four years after Burns's article, Cole admits to Max that part of the reason he finds him so irritating is that Max is a better person than he is. Powerplay merged with PvP to prevent PvP's certain financial ruin. Because of his narcissistic attitude, Max was unable to see Skull, and was unaware of the troll's existence. However, Shecky punched Max as an 'incentive to see the world beyond [his] nose', changing Max's perceptions. Unfortunately, Max thought Cole was letting the staff keep a pair of 'dogs' on the premises and said the 'yappy one' (Shecky) snapped at his face. (See March 13, 2006 blog entry.) As of December second in the strip, PvP and Powerplay have gone their separate ways, as Cole has come into a large sum of money which he will receive annually from the World Wildlife Fund, thanks to the near-constant attacks on Brent by a giant panda, and the fact that it appears the panda is now more or less living somewhere in the PvP offices. During a 2008 Thanksgiving Plot, it has been revealed that Cole believes that Max stole a "girlfriend" from him (they were not actually dating, but Cole believed Max made his move on her before he could). Max however adamantly denied it saying he only grew close with the girl so as to get closer to Cole and Brent. This led Cole and Brent to the assumption that Max is gay, and was attracted to one of them. The former has been confirmed in a 2011 strip in which Max admits to Jade that he is in fact gay; he begs her not to tell anyone else, and she has so far complied with his request. During a conversation with his sister Sonya, it was revealed that Max had a partner named Chris. Max later reveals that he is gay to the rest of the group when Lucille convinces him that it is doing him no good keeping it secret.

After a year's absence from the strip, during which he drove cross-country on a motorcycle doing good deeds, Max returned to the PvP offices to ask Cole for a job. He is now also able to see Skull, most likely because he is now "pure of heart" after a year of soul-searching. The new Max, after realizing the company was doomed in a few months, broke into Cole's office and went over the financial statements to confirm his fears. After a confrontation with Cole, after which Cole confessed the state of the company to Brent, Cole set Max off to find a new business plan and opportunities. After several weeks Max returned from Seattle, advising PVP to cease publication immediately, switch to a strictly online format (which was the only portion of the business generating a profit), and move the company from Dallas to Seattle. This reflects Scott Kurtz's real-life move of a year earlier in 2010.

=== Scratch Fury, Destroyer of Worlds ===
Skull's cat. Francis attempted to give it to Brent to make the latter feel some Christmas spirit, but the ploy failed and Skull decided to take the cat in. Skull accidentally zapped him with his "genius machine", granting him superhuman intelligence. Scratch is bent on global domination, but his evil plans for attaining it have so far been foiled by his feline foibles and proclivities. He is Pinky and the Brain in the same body, and they're fighting for dominance. It is worth noting that while Scratch is still a genius – after Skull's departure, he was seen in the basement, working on a machine of some sort with a welding torch – he appears to be unable to communicate to the other members of the magazine. It has been suggested that the ambient magic surrounding Skull was what made Scratch's ability to communicate with humans possible in the first place. However, Kurtz has admitted that the lack of understanding Scratch was just a mistake, and changed the strip to have Scratch deliberately talking in cat-speak. Also, he becomes "Kringus" a Christmas tree-themed villain in numerous stories set in yule times. Scratch has mostly given up on evil schemes, and has focused on killing Garfield and running his "Cool Cat Club".

=== Lolbat ===
Lolbat is Kurtz's version of Batman and Robin. He derives his powers from a material called memetic fabric, which allows him to talk like he is in an internet meme. He fights members of the Algonquin hate table, made up of internet supervillains like The Savage Critic, The Scrabbler, and the Mad Hater. He also serves as Robbie's manservant during the day. Lolbat has recently acquired a sidekick named Retweet (also known as Wade), who talks like a Twitter post. He is also assisted by Jade's sister Miranda, who discovered the lair of the Lolbat and decided to assist him by becoming the Instagirl, a phone based superhero.

== Publication ==
=== Online strip ===
The first online strip was posted on Monday, May 4, 1998. Kurtz normally updates the strip every day but has occasionally missed updates since the comic's inception, less so after the PVP 2.0 revamp. In April 2005, Kurtz changed to a Monday through Friday schedule, with Friday's strip in color and sketches on Saturday and Sunday, in response to the mounting work he had taken on as a monthly comic at Image and associated side projects. On June 4, 2005, Scott Kurtz posted on his blog that he was returning to the daily schedule. On May 6, 2008, Kurtz reaffirmed the strip to a Monday through Friday schedule. Although the strip was initially formatted 2×2 to fit on 800×600 resolution screens, it switched to "widescreen" (1×4) on February 3, 2003. The strip celebrated its 10th anniversary on Sunday, May 4, 2008 with the wedding of two of PvP's main characters, Brent Sienna and Jade Fontaine.

Occasionally single strips or short series have been presented drawn by guest cartoonists, such as KC Green.

=== Print versions ===
Previously, Dork Storm Press printed 6 issues of original content as well as a trade paperback of online strips. The Dork Storm issues were collected into a trade paperback entitled "The Dork Ages."

In March 2003, Image Comics began publishing a monthly print comic book collection of the strip that combined old strips with new material. Publication of single issues and the Image partnership ended in March 2010 after over 7 years and 45 issues. In addition to publishing single issues Image released a 16-page primer (numbered as #0), and seven trade paperbacks (each collecting 6 issues) – "PvP: At Large" (#1–6), "PvP: Reloaded" (#7–12), "PvP Rides Again" (#13–18), "PVP Goes Bananas" (#19–25), "PvP Treks On" (#25–30), "PvP Silent But Deadly" and "PVP Levels Up". A 10-year anniversary collection, Awesomology Deluxe, was also published by Image in 2009. After the ending of the Image partnership Kurtz switched to self publishing the print editions but only in collected form.

At the 2004 San Diego Comic-Con, Kurtz announced that he would offer to newspapers the entire PvP series to reprint for free, but only if the strips were reprinted without any changes made. Kurtz said he made this offer because of his dissatisfaction with the terms offered to cartoonists by syndicates. As of 2011 no major American newspaper has agreed to regularly pick up his strip, even though it is free. One newspaper, The Kansas City Star, briefly ran one PvP strip per week in the fall of 2004.

In 2018, Kurtz launched a Kickstarter campaign to publish digital and physical media of PVP Online as a 20th Anniversary Collection printing of the previous 20 years of the comic. The material is planned for printing in eight volumes, with a supplementary 20th anniversary volume. The campaign achieved its fundraising goal, raising over $120,000 towards publication. Despite reaching that goal, Kurtz has yet to produce the promised rewards under the campaign. He last updated the campaign site on May 1, 2022, noting that it had been two years since the previous update. As of July 2026, Kurtz confirmed there will be no print release of the books, allegedly due to Toonhound Studios closing down. They were made available in PDF format and he considers the project closed.

=== PvP: The Series ===
Kurtz announced on November 27, 2006 that from February 2007, a traditionally animated cartoon series would be available over the internet via a subscription service, produced in conjunction with Blind Ferret Entertainment. Episodes were 4–6 minutes in length and released on a monthly schedule, co-written and co-produced by webcartoonist Kris Straub. A total of 12 episodes were produced, and have since been released on DVD as "PvP: The Series Season One DVD".

The announcement of the series was marked with some interest on video game forums due to Kurtz's previous criticism of Tim Buckley when he announced CAD Premium, an animated series based on his own web comic, particularly when both Buckley and Kurtz used the same animation studio for their respective ventures.

== Awards and nominations ==
PvP has won multiple awards:

Year	Award	Category	Result	Notes
2005	Eisner Awards	Best Writer/Artist - Humor	Nominated	
2005	Eagle Awards	Favourite Web-based Comic	Won	
2006	Eisner Awards	Best Digital Comic	Won	
2010	Harvey Awards	Best Online Comics Work	Won	

A spinoff of PvP, Table Titans, was nominated for a Harvey Award in 2014 in the category of Best Online Comics Work.
