= Kris Straub =

American webcartoonist

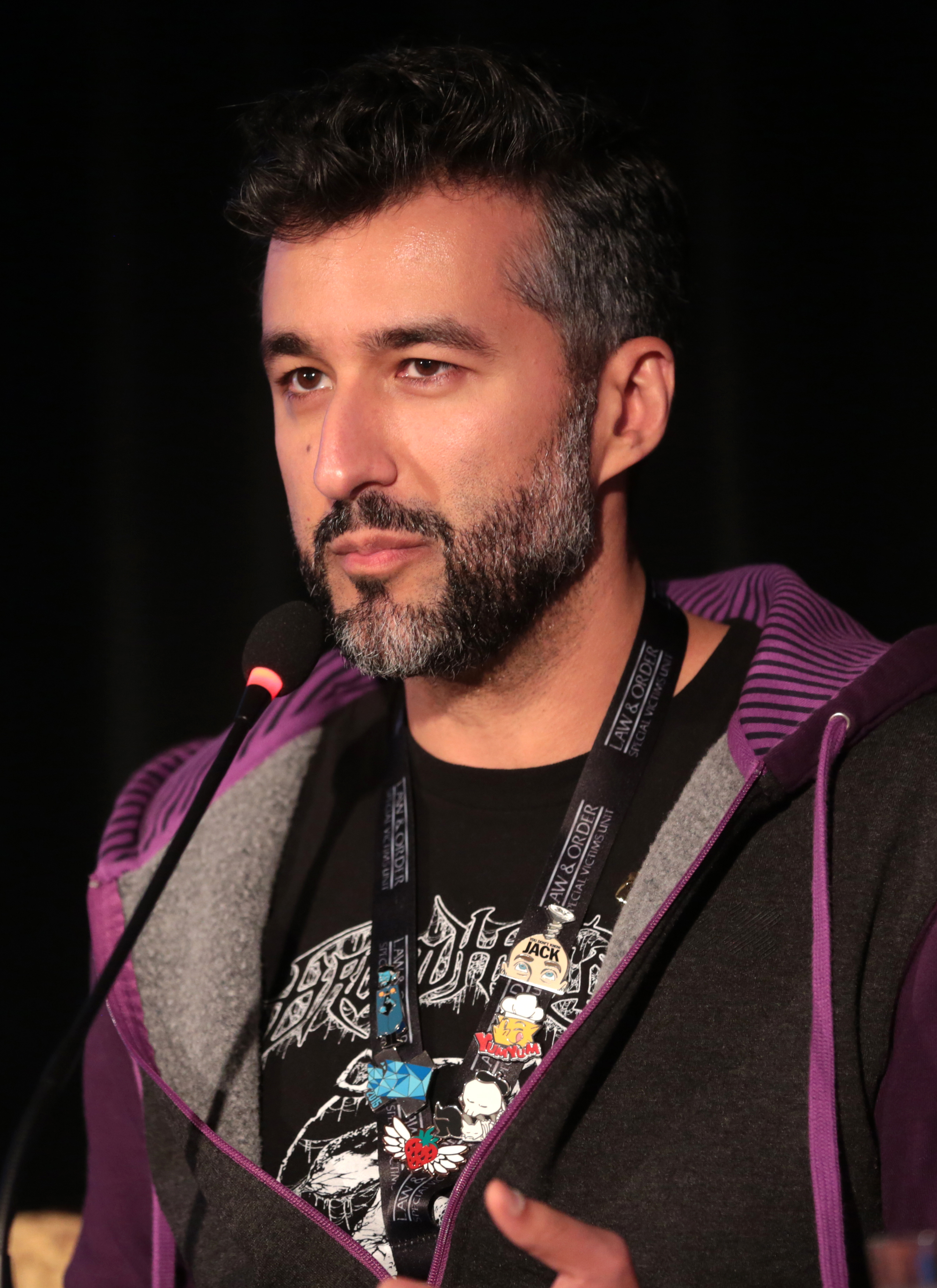
- Straub at the 2018 PAX West
- Born: Kristofer Straub; January 17, 1979 (age 47); Los Angeles, California, U.S.
- Education: University of California, Los Angeles
- Occupations: Cartoonist, graphic designer, story writer
- Years active: 2007–present
- Known for: Creator of Starslip, Checkerboard Nightmare, Chainsawsuit, Broodhollow, Candle Cove, Local58 and F Chords
- Website: http://www.krisstraub.com

Kristofer "Kris" Straub (born January 17, 1979) is an American animator, web cartoonist, podcaster, and writer. His key web comic projects include Checkerboard Nightmare, Starslip, Chainsawsuit, Broodhollow, and F Chords. Other notable projects include the creepypasta "Candle Cove" as well as collaborations with Scott Kurtz (Blamimations), Paul Verhoeven (28 Plays Later), and Penny Arcade (Strip Search, Kris and Scott's Scott and Kris Show, Acquisitions Incorporated: The C-Team).

He has written and produced the YouTube analog horror series Local 58 since October 26, 2015. He also works with Penny Arcade in graphic design, as well as co-hosting the PAX gaming conventions and appearing in their collaborations with Wizards of the Coast and Chaosium, Inc.

== Career ==
Straub graduated from the University of California, Los Angeles, with a degree in computer science.

=== Web cartoonist ===
Straub launched his first comic, Checkerboard Nightmare, online in 2000. The strip was self-aware and used metahumour to follow the main character Chex's obsession with gaining fame as a webcomic character.

In 2005, Straub began creating Starslip Crisis (eventually shortened to Starslip), a daily science fiction/comedy webcomic. Starslip was first set in the 3440s and followed the crew of starship-museum IDS Fuseli, named after painter Henry Fuseli, which largely featured 20th and 21st century art. Starslip Crisis was part of the webcomics cooperation collective Blank Label Comics until Straub split away from Blank Label to merge Starslip with his new collective, Halfpixel, in November 2007.

The comic initially ran under the name Starshift Crisis. The nearly identical Starslip Crisis appeared early in the strip's run, with its own website and associated content, differing only in that the term "starslip" replaced "starshift". The two ran in parallel, until a strip in August 2005 which definitively ended the plot of Starshift Crisis, but which played out differently in Starslip Crisis. Reportedly, the name change was caused by a legal issue.

In 2008, Straub began writing another webcomic, Chainsawsuit, publishing three strips a week. The comic featured simple black and white drawings and slapstick humor. It ran for 11 years and achieved particular notoriety for its strip All Houses Matter upon release in 2014 and then again during the 2020 Black Lives Matter protests.

In 2012, Straub launched the webcomic Broodhollow, a self-described "serial horror comic." Set in the titular town, the story follows door-to-door encyclopedia salesman Wadsworth Zane as he uncovers the town's secrets. The first two volumes Curious Little Thing and Angleworm pair horror with a quirky tone to explore themes of community and tradition, among others. Following creative difficulties beginning in 2015, the series attempted a failed rework of the current volume in 2016 and has been on hiatus ever since.

=== Writer and producer ===
In December 2006, Straub became co-writer and co-producer alongside Scott Kurtz on PvP: The Series, a series of animated shorts featuring the PvP characters. In 2007 he repurposed the Halfpixel site to serve as a hub for his and Kurtz's joint creative projects. Halfpixel later expanded to include webcartoonists Brad Guigar and Dave Kellett of the comics Evil Inc. and Sheldon, respectively. The four published How To Make Webcomics through Image Comics in the first quarter of 2008. The book covers a variety of topics of interest for beginning and intermediate webcartoonists.

Straub went on to co-produce Blamimations and the Kris and Scott’s Scott and Kris Show for Penny Arcade TV. In 2012, ShiftyLook announced that Straub and Kurtz were co-producing a new animated web series, Mappy: The Beat, in which they also voiced all the characters. The series premiered in July 2013 and aired for 13 episodes.

From 2008-2012, Straub managed and wrote for his own horror fiction website Ichor Falls, which featured his most notable work of short fiction, Candle Cove. Structured as a series of forum posts, it follows people discussing a forgotten children's program. They uncover increasingly disturbing shared memories of the program before discovering that Candle Cove was merely half an hour of TV static which they, as children, had collectively perceived as a story. Rights to the story were picked up by SyFy in 2016 and served as the basis for the first season of the series Channel Zero.

In 2015, Straub published the first video in his horror web series Local 58 TV, which was later moved to YouTube. The series coined the term analog horror and arguably kickstarted the popularity of the genre. Some critics cite Straub and Local 58 as having solidified conventions which would go on to define the genre and even indirectly influence feature-length horror films such as Skinamarink (2022). Additionally, in 2021 Straub launched an Alternate Reality Game based on the series hosted at local58.tv, which is still running as of April 11, 2026.

=== Podcast host ===
Straub has co-hosted numerous podcasts, most of which center around the online comic industry, daily life, or comedy talk shows.

In 2005, while part of the comic collective Blank Label Comics, Straub and Dave Kellett co-hosted the Blank Label Comics Podcast. The podcast interviewed fellow webcomic creators about their comics and creative process.

In 2007, leading up to the release of How To Make Webcomics, Straub - alongside the books co-authors, Scott Kurtz, Brad Guigar, and Dave Kellett - produced the podcast Webcomics Weekly. The show featured industry news and insight on making a successful web comic. In this same time period, Straub and Kurtz also produced two joint podcasts, The Kris and Scott Power Hour and Daily Affirmation.

From 2009 to 2012, Straub also hosted the comedy internet radio talk show Tweet Me Harder with David Malki. The show was recorded live, with the hosts taking comments from Twitter. Its transcripts were later published in paperback form under the title, "Hey World, Here Are Some Suggestions." Following Tweet Me Harder, Straub then co-hosted Chainsawsuit: The Podcast with Mikey Neumann. The show began in April 2013 and spanned to December 2014. Beginning in January 2015, Straub and Neumann began hosting Morning Rush, which ended in June 2015 after 16 episodes.

In 2016, from July to December, Straub co-hosted the horror podcast Scared Yet? with cartoonist Abby Howard. It lasted 6 episodes, with Straub and Howard discussing horror storytelling, writing advice, personal favorite horror stories, as well as personal experiences with writing horror.

=== Performer ===
Beginning in 2017, Straub has had recurring roles in the table top role playing game (TTRPG) Dungeons & Dragons (D&D) actual-play series Acquisitions Incorporated, and spinoff Acquisitions Incorporated: The "C" Team. The series is a collaboration between Penny Arcade and Wizards of the Coast, and was eventually canonized in the official D&D sourcebook Acquisitions Incorporated (2019). Straub's character, writing, and art appear in the book and its related materials. He also writes and produces animated recaps and interstitials for both series.

In 2022, Straub took over for Penny Arcade's Mike Krahulik to co-host some key PAX events with Jerry Holkins. He is also the lead storyteller in Penny Arcade's Call of Cthulhu live-play collaborations with Chaosium, Inc. at PAX Australia.
