= Jinyiwei (disambiguation) =

Jinyiwei typically refers to Embroidered Uniform Guards, the imperial secret police during the Chinese Ming dynasty (1368–1644).

Jinyiwei may also refer to:

- Secret Service of the Imperial Court, a 1984 Hong Kong film
- 14 Blades, a 2010 Chinese film
- A Pretended Rebel, a 1979 Taiwanese film starring Yueh Hua
- The Court Secret Agent, a 1988 Hong Kong TV series starring Eric Wan
- Imperial Guards, a 2006 Chinese TV series starring Wen Zhang
- The secret police from drive: the scifi comic
