= The Hues =

Supernatural webcomic by Alex Heberling

- Cover of the first book collection of The Hues
- Author: Alex Heberling
- Website: http://thehues.alexheberling.com/
- Current status/schedule: Last updated in November 2018
- Launch date: January 2013
- Genre: Supernatural

The Hues is a webcomic by Alex Heberling, about girls who discover they have supernatural powers during an alien invasion.

== Synopsis ==
The Hues is set in Columbus, Ohio, following the narrator Samhita "Sami" Raju, an Indian-American character. The comic is set during an alien invasion. As the extraterrestrial threat attacks, Sami discovers a supernatural power within herself that helps her survive. Sami goes on to meet other teenagers with similar powers, including Andrea, who has extrasensory empathy, Hannah, who can control fire, and Lauren, who can control electricity. The girls must learn to use their new, not fully controlled powers. The plot of The Hues is mostly driven by the characters as they convert Sami's house for a haven for survivors. While Lauren attempts to stay a lone wolf, Andrea has to deal with the drain her empath abilities put on her.

== Development ==
Heberling says that she started work on the comic in 1998 at age 12, but gave up on it for some time and worked on other comics, including Garanos and an autobiographical comic called Alex’s Guide To A Life Well Lived. Heberling says that her initial version was "this trite magic girl fan fiction" with similar-looking white characters, but that she was inspired to return to it and to improve its diversity of ethnicities and body types after learning about representation, structural racism in entertainment and media, and how roles in Hollywood get whitewashed so often.

Heberling resurrected it "as a completely new comic towards the end of 2011 and 2012". It was launched in January 2013; Heberling was working full time on The Hues by 2013, though in a 2016 interview Heberling reported doing other cartooning work as well, mainly coloring for Evil Inc.

Two volumes of the comic have been printed as physical books through Kickstarter, though in the first Kickstarter Herberling reported problems with a fraudulent backer withdrawing a large donation after rewards were sent.

As of November 2020, the comic had not updated in over two years.

== Reception ==
A journalist for Columbus Alive in 2015 described it as "Sailor Moon and Independence Day colliding at high speeds", and called it "fast-paced, enthralling and beautifully drawn".

A reviewer for Sequential Tart disagreed on the pace of the story, describing Volume One as "a bit slow", and noted some "plot convenience on how people and supplies survived", but said it had "a consistent build from beginning to end", praised all the main characters and their diversity, and liked the character designs and their movement. The reviewer rated Volume Two higher, saying, "if you're looking for a good, entertaining read that offers a truly diverse cast, this is it. The balance of sci-fi and fantasy is well-integrated with the realistic modern-day setting."

A reviewer for Women Write About Comics praised The Hues greatly, including its painstaking care and attention to worldbuilding and detail, the lush art, and the diversity, saying "When I said diverse, I wasn’t kidding: different races, different personalities, different body types, different life preferences, and that’s true for more than just the core cast. There are no cookie cutters coming out of Alex’s digital pen!" and said her attention was grabbed from Volume 1, page one.
