= Table Titans =

- Author: Scott Kurtz
- Current status/schedule: Ongoing

Table Titans is a Dungeons & Dragons-based webcomic created by Scott Kurtz, which debuted on January 28, 2013. It is a spin-off of Kurtz's other webcomic PvP, and features characters who have previously appeared in PvP comics. Table Titans is produced by Kurtz, Steve Hamaker, Brian Hurtt, and Tavis Maiden.

== Creation and premise ==
In an interview, creator Scott Kurtz said that he hoped to "create a comic book that captured the spirit and joy of tabletop roleplaying", and that a reader survey showed that many PvP fans were into tabletop gaming. Unlike PvP, Table Titans was designed to be a serialized ongoing comic book rather than a strip comic.

Table Titans follows the 'Table Titans' role playing group and their rivals the 'Dungeon Dogs', and moves between the real lives of the players and the world of the Dungeons & Dragons characters they play. Table Titans has had four "seasons": seasons 1 and 2 followed the Table Titans playing games in the Forgotten Realms setting, while seasons 3 and 4 followed the Dungeon Dogs in a homebrew setting called Fallen Veil. In April 2020, Kurtz announced a fifth season to be set during the characters' high school days.

The Table Titans website also includes reader-submitted stories from their own roleplaying games.

The comic has a collaboration with the creators of Dungeons & Dragons (D&D), Wizards of the Coast, who has promoted the comic on its social media sites and allow Table Titans to produce official D&D products.

== Characters ==
- Alan: A member of the Table Titans. He has played as the master thief and assassin Garret Murdor, the lawful good cleric Drake Shieldheart, and the ranger Arroc Crowforth. Alan is driven in games by power and loot.
- Andrew: A member of the Table Titans who has played the character Quillion Hawkslight and the halfling thief Sootfoot Lefleur. Andrew is a rules lawyer and wants to be a dungeon master himself.
- Val: The only female member of the Table Titans. Her character is Lulani, a bard. She is dating Skull from PvP. In season two she plays her own character Valeria Bronzebottom, a niece to Binwin Bronzebottom, Scott Kurtz' character from the Acquisitions Incorporated live game held at PAX. Val is the member most interested in roleplaying.
- Darby: A member of the Table Titans. Unlike the rest of the Titans, he is new to D&D and unfamiliar with its rules. His character is Draziw, a half-elf wizard. He is an optimist and often sees things in ways the more experienced players miss. While the other Titans were not initially fond of him, he is accepted as a full Titan by the end of the first season.
- Brendan: The dungeon master (DM) for the game. He values story ahead of rules. The Titans initially do not like him as a DM, but are forced to accept him because nobody else wants to put up with them. Later, they warm up to him and decide to continue with him as their DM.
- Darius: The newest member of the Table Titans, Darius is first introduced as the bartender at Cafe Mox, the venue that the players use during the campaign for the Winotaur trophy. When the Table Titans restructure their group for the "Winter of the Iron Dwarf" campaign, they find that the group needs a healer, and Brendan recruits Darius to fill in as a player. Darius' character is Gar Dunwise, Paladin of Torm.

== Awards and reception ==
Table Titans was nominated for a Harvey Award in 2014, in the category of Best Online Comics Work.

Matt O'Keefe of The Beat described Table Titans in 2015 as a "huge-and-still-growing webcomic series". A Geek Dad review of Book One said that Table Titans is "a great mix of humor and inside jokes and knowing nods" and that it "has nailed so many (too many!) aspects of roleplaying gamers", adding "there are so many reasons why I'm such a fan of Table Titans, but I think it comes down to recognizing a little bit of myself and my fellow gamers in the pages....there's a little dose of truth in every panel." In a 2018 review, a writer for Tribality described it as " a favorite of mine... I enjoy how Kurtz reveals a story from the eyes of the characters and balances that with all of the table talk by the players."

In an interview in 2015, Kurtz said that Table Titans had the same traffic as PvP on days when new strips were posted. A 2016 review on Geek Dad said the comic had "a huge following".
