= Mario Marathon =

Annual fundraiser

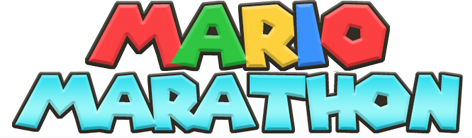
- Genre: Gaming marathon
- Date: 2008-2014, 2016-2018, 2020
- Frequency: Annual
- Location: Lafayette, Indiana
- Years active: 9
- Inaugurated: June 27, 2008
- Most recent: July 30–31, 2020
- Participants: Brian Brinegar, Chris Deckard, John Groth
- Website: Mariomarathon.com/

Mario Marathon is an annual fund raiser for Child's Play Charity. As of August 24, 2017, the event has raised more than $600,000 during the seven years it has been running. In 2008, the event organizers also orchestrated a smaller Zelda marathon that managed to bring in an additional $2,477.00 for Child's Play Charity.

The Mario Marathon team plays the Super Mario video game series. Levels to be played are each unlocked at specific total donation levels, which the Mario Marathon team plays nonstop until either all the games are completed or until gameplay catches up to the current unlocked level.

== History ==
Mario Marathon began in 2008 when Brian Brinegar, a 29-year-old web developer in Lafayette, Indiana, was inspired to start a Super Mario video game marathon after watching a group of college students who attempted to complete all four of the 3-D Zelda games in a 48-hour time period. Over a period of 57 hours starting on June 27, Brian Brinegar, Dan May, and John Groth raised $11,767.00 for Child's Play Charity. Later that year, they teamed up with the Four48 group who inspired the original Mario Marathon. Together they held the Zelda Marathon, raising $2,477.00.

The second Mario Marathon began on July 10, 2009. Chris "SlouchGuy" Deckard expanded the player roster to take the place of Dan May, who was out of the country. The event raised $29,082.76 and lasted over four days. It was also the first year that Mario Marathon started to finish various Mario games at 100% completion.

The third Mario Marathon started on June 25, 2010, and raised $82,382.70 over 109 hours. This was the first year to include Skype interactivity with both Wil Wheaton and Felicia Day making Skype calls during the Marathon. Mario Marathon 2010 also achieved $25,310 within the first 24 hours, nearly the total of Mario Marathon 2009.

The fourth Mario Marathon began on June 24, 2011, and raised $112,668.62 (as of July 18, 2011) over a period of 110 hours. Mario Marathon 2011 advances include Super Mario Bros.: The Lost Levels and upgraded video and audio equipment.

The fifth Mario Marathon started on June 22, 2012, and ran for about four days. It raised approximately $112,757.90.

The sixth Mario Marathon began on June 21, 2013, and ran for 72 hours, raising $67,708.75. Within the first day, multiple news outlets including Haverzine and Brazilian video game news site Reino do Cogumelo reported on the event.

The seventh Mario Marathon got underway on June 20, 2014. At 10:05 PM Eastern Time on June 24, 2014, the lifetime Child's Play Charity donation total crossed over the half-million dollars mark.

After being idle during 2015, the eighth edition is named Mario Marathon '16 and began at 11:00 AM Eastern Time on June 24, 2016.

"Mario Marathon '17" commenced at 11:00 AM Eastern Time on June 23, 2017. On June 25, 2017, the donation total crossed the $600,000 mark. The event concluded June 27 and for the first time occurred at Jed's house and featured several fans on-site for the event such as CoW mAn of Vacation Impossible.

In 2018 the event was held later in the year than usual, commencing July 20 at 7:00 PM Eastern Time, and only featured one game, Super Mario Odyssey.

In 2020, after being idle for 2019, Mario Marathon returned for the "Mario Marathon Social Distancing Spectacular" amidst the COVID-19 pandemic. On July 30, 2020, at 11:00 AM Eastern Time the Marathon commenced, featuring only the seven Mario games played during the original Mario Marathon.

== Participants ==
There are a number of recurring members of the Mario Marathon team. The players trade off on a game-to-game basis. The supporting cast interacts with viewers in real time via an IRC chat room and Twitter (monitoring posts which include the "#MarioMarathon" hash tag) and acknowledges donations as they come in. The list below are those who have appeared in two or more Mario Marathons:

=== Players ===
- Brian "ShirtGuy" Brinegar
- Dan "ChairGuy" May
- John "CouchGuy" Groth
- Chris "SlouchGuy" Deckard
- Nate "ShortsGuy" Jones
- Bobby "OneShot" "McLoveSeat" Arnold
- Shanna "Shannabad" Brinegar

=== Support ===
- Sundeep "OrangeShirtGuy (OSG)" Rao
- Ben "MacGuy" Cotton
- Emily "BlanketGirl" Blue
- Stephanie "SlouchGirl" Deckard
- Jedediah "Jed" Johnson
- Andy "OffCameraGuy" Sydelko
- Ben "BenGuy" Fowler
- Jessica "GlassesGirl"
- Joel "KermitGuy" Doan
- Madison "GumGirl"

== Recurring themes ==
To break up the monotony of playing games around the clock for several days, the participants started performing special dances for the viewers. These dances were most often a re-enactment of Lou Albano's "Do The Mario" from The Super Mario Bros. Super Show!, Peanut Butter Jelly Time, or a Rick Roll.

In 2011, the team implemented the Wheel of Awesome. For every $1,000 donated, a random event is chosen that the participants must perform. The name is a reference to Wil Wheaton's skype call from Mario Marathon 3 in which he referred to the event as a "Laser of Awesome". While the "Do the Mario" dance was included on the wheel, other events such as Blindfold Mode were included.

The family dog Zoe, known as "Couch Dog", is the unofficial mascot of the Mario Marathon. In Mario Marathon 2, the participants set up a camera that focused on Zoe. This became so popular that they used this camera to drive donations.

In 2010, the Couch Pig was introduced. This large ceramic piggy bank became a fixture of the later stages of the marathon. Certain donation amounts would allow the Couch Pig to be placed on the couch, while other donations would revoke those privileges. In 2011, Love Seat Pig, a smaller Couch Pig replica, was raffled off for donations.

In 2012, 2013, and 2014 Sundeep "OrangeShirtGuy (OSG)" Rao performed live "fortune telling" segments, offering humorous predictions about viewers' future lives when they sent in donations to Child's Play Charity.

To close the marathon during some years, Jedediah "Jed" Johnson performed an improvisational song, "I Don't See Nothing Wrong (With the Mario Marathon)," in the style of R. Kelly's "Bump and Grind." References to events in the just-completed marathon were typically included.

In 2012, the concept of "Gold Membership" was introduced –a supposed exclusive avenue to obtain special perks. In 2013, a small number of donators were randomly designated "Gold Members". No real perks were involved.

In 2016, "combo trains" were introduced. When users donate any sum of money three times in a row, it triggers a donation combo train that users must extend with donations. Those who participated in combos were typically entered into a raffle to win a T-shirt. As of Day 2 of Mario Marathon 2016, the record combo is made up of over 300 donations.

== Bowser rules ==
To keep the stream civil and child-safe, the Mario Marathon team conforms to a list of rules:

1. No swearing or offensive language
2. No stereotyping based on ethnicity, gender, sexual orientation, etc.
3. No religious or political conversations
4. If you need to answer your phone, go outside
5. Clean up after yourself and take out the trash!
6. Shower once per 24 hours
7. FAIL 5 times = FAIL hat
8. FAIL 10 times = EPIC FAIL hat
9. Remember, it's for the children
10. No fish on pizza. Ever.

== Marathon list ==
Marathon	Date	Length	Money raised
Mario Marathon	June 27–29, 2008	47 hours, 42 minutes	$11,767.00
Zelda Marathon	July 31- Aug. 2, 2008	58 hours, 30 minutes	$2,477.00
Mario Marathon 2	June 26–29, 2009	96 hours, 30 minutes	$29,082.76
Mario Marathon 3	June 25–29, 2010	109 hours, 8 minutes	$82,382.70
Mario Marathon 4	June 24–28, 2011	110 hours	$112,668.62
Mario Marathon 5	June 22–26, 2012	111 hours, 22 minutes	$112,757.90
Mario Marathon 6	June 21–24, 2013	72 hours	$67,708.75
Mario Marathon 7	June 20–24, 2014	109 hours, 59 minutes	$85,651.79
Mario Marathon '16	June 24–28, 2016	85 hours	$58,125.06
Mario Marathon '17	June 23–27, 2017	106 hours, 30 minutes	$73,794.20
Mario Odyssey Marathon	July 20–22, 2018	51 hours, 25 minutes	$30,937.20
Mario Marathon Social Distancing Spectacular	July 30–31, 2020	35 hours, 15 minutes	$33,657.79
