= Child's Play (charity) =

Children's charity

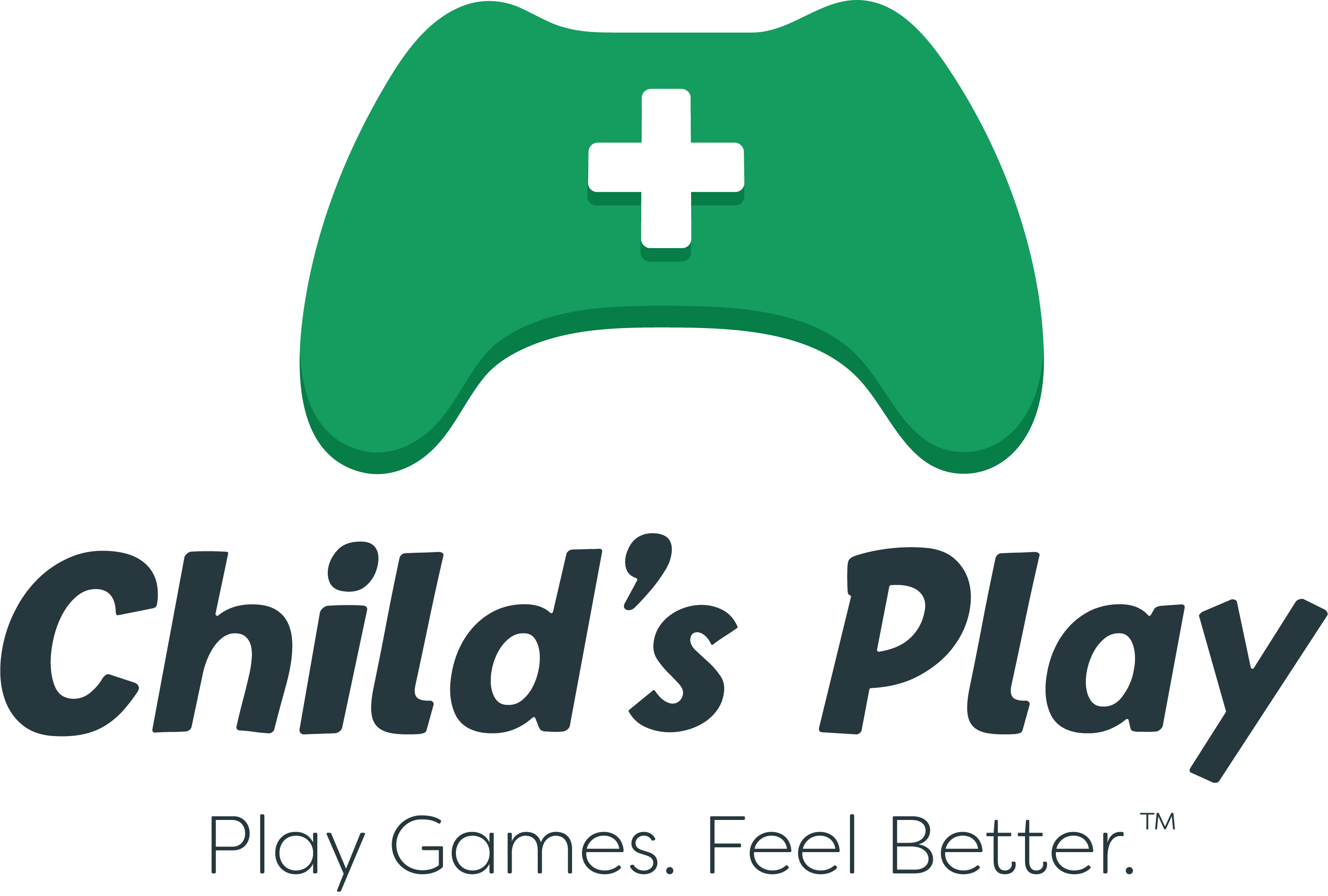
2022 logo

Child's Play is a charitable organization that donates toys and games to children's hospitals worldwide. It was founded in 2003 by Mike Krahulik and Jerry Holkins, authors of the popular video games-related webcomic Penny Arcade. The charity is seen as a way to refute mainstream media's perception of gamers as violent and antisocial. As of 2025, Child's Play had processed over $67 million in donations since its inception.

== Logistics ==
With the help of hospital staff, Child's Play sets up gift wishlists on Amazon.com, full of video games, books, toys and movies. These wishlists send items directly to the facilities as in-kind donations. Instead of buying items off the wishlists users can donate money through PayPal or check. This money is used to make annual wholesale purchases to provide technology like iPads and Xbox systems as well as games and movies.

The charity also has a space for corporate sponsors who have donated. The sponsors also earn a corporate sponsorship level (Silver, Gold and Platinum) and get linked back on Childsplaycharity.org. These sponsors include several video game marathons such as the Mario Marathon and Desert Bus for Hope, as well as YouTube series such as Far Lands or Bust by Kurtjmac.

== History ==
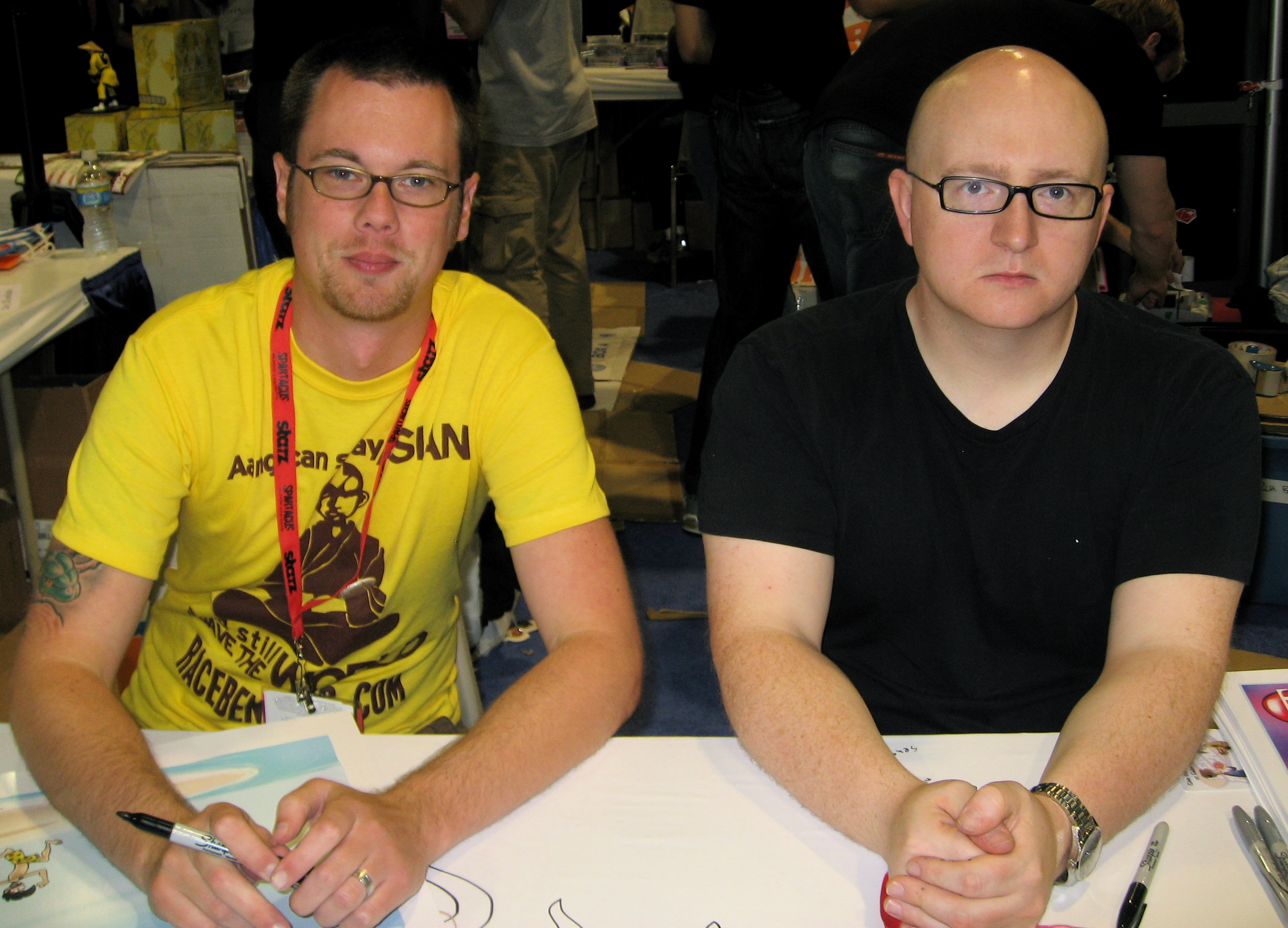
Mike Krahulik and Jerry Holkins founded Child's Play in 2003.

Child's Play was announced on November 24, 2003, by the authors of Penny Arcade as a challenge to their readership, and as a response to the often negative portrayal of video gamers in the media, most notably a HeraldNet article by Bill France entitled "Violent video games are training children to kill." (France later made an apology in the same column, praising the effort.) It received positive press on many popular weblogs, including Slashdot and received direct endorsement from Wil Wheaton. In less than one month of publicity and operation, the charity raised over $250,000 in cash and toys for the Children's Hospital and Regional Medical Center in Seattle, Washington.

In 2004, the charity was expanded and partnered with children's hospitals in Seattle; Oakland, California; San Diego, California; Houston, Texas; and Washington, D.C.

By January 5, 2005, when the final numbers for 2004 were tabulated, the charity had raised over $310,000 ($60,000 more than the previous year), and gained forty corporate sponsors in the process. Among these sponsors were Nintendo, Midway Games, Cerulean Studios, and THQ.

In 2005, the charity was again expanded to partner with an additional seven children's hospitals across the United States, as well as children's hospitals in Toronto and Halifax, Nova Scotia, Canada. It is also partnered with Alder Hey Children's Hospital in Liverpool, England. At the time when they stopped accepting donations, the community had raised $605,000. There was an auction to appear in a Penny Arcade comic strip at the 2005 Child's Play Charity Dinner. The winning bid of $20,000 was placed by Christian Boggs. Mr. Boggs also placed the winning bid on an original pencil sketch of the PAX 2005 program cover on eBay. 100% of the profits went to the American Red Cross.

In 2006, the charity was further expanded, adding four hospitals in the United States, two in Australia, and one in Egypt. In addition to this, on December 13, 2006, there was a charity dinner and auction, where items participants were able to bid on included a gaming day for four in the Penny Arcade office, an appearance in a Penny Arcade strip, a tour of Bungie and recording session for the voice of a character in Halo 3, and a two-year subscription to World of Warcraft and the Burning Crusade special edition signed by all the developers. The year 2006 also became the first time that the 1 million dollar mark was reached.

In 2007, the charity added a hospital each in Hawaii and New Zealand.

During the 2008 Penny Arcade Expo, Harmonix announced that three songs from the Expo will be made available for download for the Rock Band video game. The proceeds of these three songs will go to the charity.

On November 13, 2009, Mike Krahulik announced that after one week, the Child's Play 2009 total had already reached $455,863.80.

In 2010, Epic Games held a vote-by-purchase event between July 29 and September 6 to determine the fate of a character, Clayton Carmine, in their upcoming game Gears of War 3. Gamers voted by purchasing Xbox avatar T-shirts through Xbox live, or real life T-shirts at San Diego Comic-Con, with all purchases counting towards the vote. The voting campaign raised over $150,000, all of which was donated to Child's Play.

In 2011, Mike Krahulik announced the first annual Child's Play Invitational Golf Tournament to be held at the Brookside Golf Course in Pasadena, California on June 5, 2011. All proceeds from the event go to the partner hospitals & facilities in the Child's Play network. The Golf Tournament was subsequently held at Angeles National Golf Course in Sunland, California, on June 8, 2012, and Inglewood Golf Club in Kenmore, Washington, on May 20, 2013.

In November 2013, Program Coordinator Jamie Dillion announced the first ever expansion of Child's Play to benefit children in domestic violence facilities. The program was announced as a pilot and is scheduled to expand to open applications in Spring 2014. The shelter program will provide a pre-built game cart with game system, television, and games and will serve emergency shelters, long term shelters, advocacy centers and more.

In 2016, the charity raised over $160k at their Annual Dinner Auction, provided nearly 30 grants to libraries, shelters, schools, trauma centers, transitional housing, day programs and more to help them purchase games and systems. It also helped supply VR setups to hospitals for therapy and distraction, along with iPads to special education classrooms and inpatient psychiatric units.

== See also ==
- Get-Well Gamers
