= Get-Well Gamers =

U.S. charitable organization

Get-Well Gamers is a charitable organization that aims to bring video game consoles and games to sick children in hospitals. The charity was founded in 2001 by Ryan Sharpe, who was hospitalized as a child and found that playing Donkey Kong Jr. and Zaxxon had been beneficial to his recovery. In 2005, the charity was officially recognized in the United States as 501(c)(3) charitable organization. By October 2006, the organization had expanded to cover over 40 hospitals in more than 20 states. The charity accepts donations of video game systems and games from 1989 and later from both individuals and companies. Since its founding, the group has received support from various other gaming-related organizations such as the International Game Developers Association and Nvidia.

In 2014, Get-Well Gamers expanded into Europe with the launch of Get-Well Gamers UK .

In 2016, Get-Well Gamers was fully absorbed into the Ablegamers charity, with Ryan Sharpe being given a position on the Ablegamers advisory board.

== See also ==
- Child's Play (charity)
