= Dave Kellett =

American cartoonist

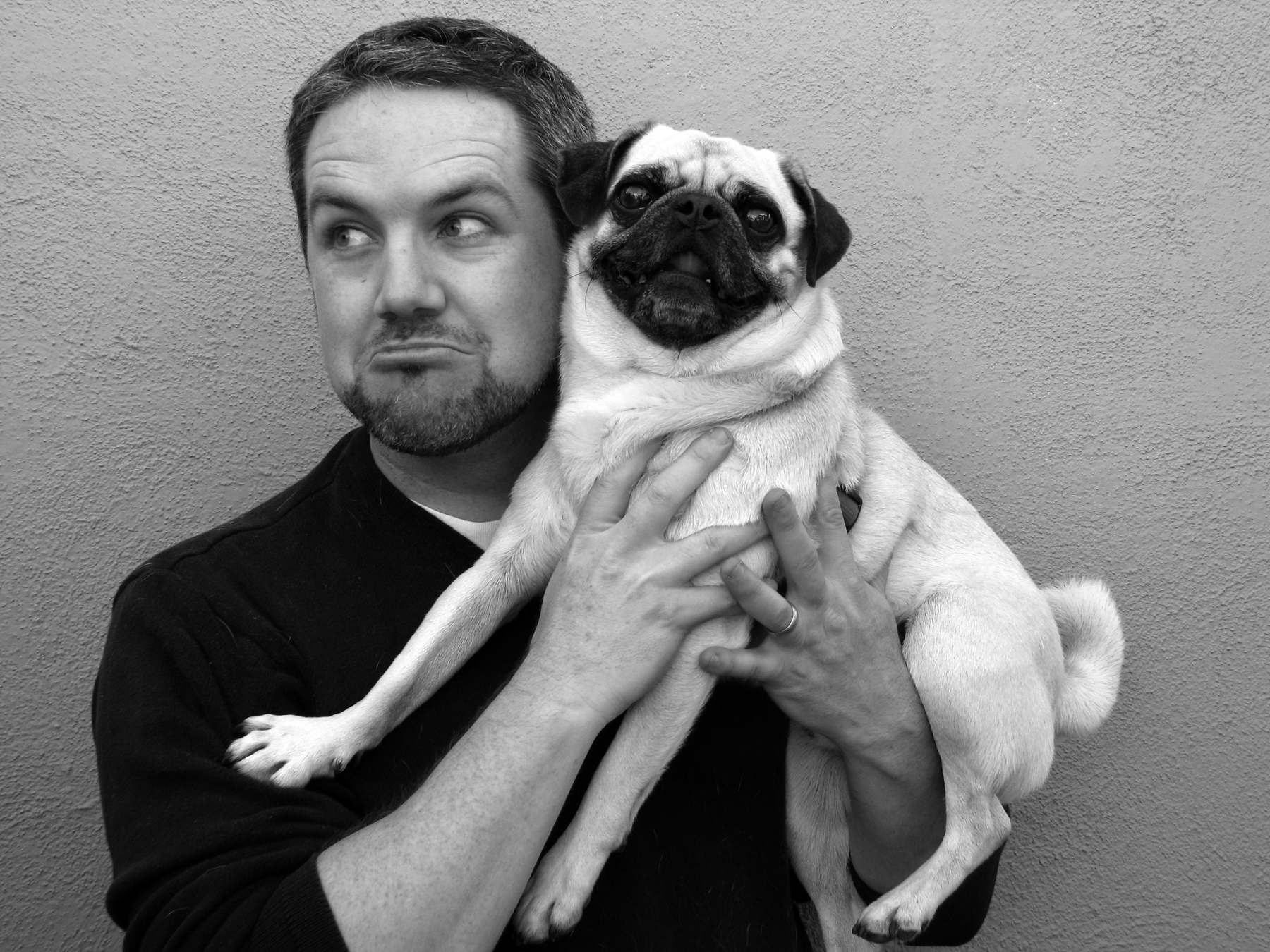
- Areas: Cartoonist, Writer, Penciller, Inker, Publisher
- Notable works: Sheldon; Drive
- Collaborators: Brad Guigar, ComicLab podcast
- Awards: Silver Reuben Award, Online Comics: Short Form
- Spouse: Gloria Calderon Kellett (2001–present)

- University of Notre Dame ('96); University of California, San Diego ('97); University of Kent at Canterbury ('99)

Dave Kellett is the cartoonist of Drive and Sheldon, a co-director of the documentary Stripped, and a co-host of the podcast ComicLab. He has been nominated for a Hugo, various Eisners, various Harveys, and won a Reuben Award.

== Early years and education ==
Kellett is a southern California native. He graduated from the University of Notre Dame with a bachelor's degree in English and Spanish. While there, he produced the daily comic strip Four Food Groups of the Apocalypse for the student newspaper The Observer. He earned a master's degree from University of California, San Diego in Literature with his thesis, To draw in the crowd : the cartoon and the 'public sphere' of eighteenth-century England. He received the Rotary Foundation Ambassadorial Scholarship, to attend the University of Kent at Canterbury in England (within the Centre for Cartooning and Caricature Studies). There, he earned a master's degree in History of cartoon art propaganda with his thesis, Philip Zec: Cartoonist in a Propaganda War.

== Career ==
Dave Kellett is the creator behind the successful webcomics: Sheldon about a 10-year-old computer genius billionaire, and the sci-fi strip Drive. The author of twelve comic books, and the co-author of the Harvey-Award-nominated book How To Make Webcomics, Kellett regularly speaks around the country on the subject of cartooning in new media.

In 2014, Kellet released the comics documentary Stripped, produced with twice-Sundance-nominated cinematographer, Fred Schroeder. He has been a guest speaker at Savannah College of Art & Design, the Society of Illustrators, Ohio State’s triennial Festival of Cartoon Art, the Charles M. Schulz Museum, the San Francisco Cartoon Art Museum, Loyola Marymount University, South by Southwest (SXSW), San Diego Comic-Con, New York Comic Con, Emerald City Comic Con and more. His cartoons have appeared in the Los Angeles Times, The San Diego Union-Tribune, and dozens of others.

Kellett holds two master's degrees in the art and history of cartooning: First, at the University of California, San Diego; and then at the University of Kent, at its Centre for Cartoon and Caricature Studies, on a full academic scholarship from The Rotary Foundation. After working for Mattel Toys as the head writer and a senior toy designer for 8 years, Kellett pursued cartooning full-time in 2007. He started Sheldon in 1998 and Drive in 2009.

== Awards & Honors ==
=== Hugos ===
- 2026: Nominated, Hugo Award, Best Professional Artist — Drive

=== Eisners ===
- 2020: Nominated, Eisner Award, Best Humor Publication — Anatomy of Authors
- 2012: Nominated, Eisner Award, Best Humor Publication — Coffee: It's What's for Dinner
- 2011: Nominated, Eisner Award, Best Humor Publication — Literature: Unsuccessfully Competing Against TV Since 1953

=== Reubens ===
- 2022: Nominated, Silver Reuben Award, Online Comics: Long Form — Drive
- 2015: Won, Silver Reuben Award, Online Comics: Short Form — Sheldon
- 2015: Nominated, Silver Reuben Award, Online Comics: Long Form — Drive

=== Harveys ===
- 2013: Nominated, Harvey Award, Best Online Comics Work — Sheldon
- 2009: Nominated, Harvey Award, Best Biographical, Historical, or Journalistic Presentation — How to Make Webcomics

=== CCI Film Fest ===
- 2014: Won, Comic-Con International Independent Film Festival, Best Documentary — Stripped

=== Additional Honors ===
- 1997: Rotary Foundation Ambassadorial Scholar
- 1996: Finalist, Scripps Howard College Cartoonist Charles M. Schulz Award

== Bibliography ==
Kellett has authored the following book series.

- A Well Balanced Meal: The Very Best of: Four Food Groups of the Apocalypse (1996) ISBN 0-9655060-0-2

=== Sheldon Comics ===
The Sheldon comics series chronologically-collected include:

- Pure Ducky Goodness: The First Sheldon Collection (2005) ISBN 0-9655060-1-0
- The Good, The Bad & The Pugly: The Second Sheldon Collection (2007) ISBN 978-0-9655060-3-8
- 62% More Awesome: The Third Sheldon Collection (2007) ISBN 978-0-9655060-4-5
- A Blizzard of Lizards: The Fourth Sheldon Collection (2007) ISBN 978-0-9655060-5-2
- Nerds On Parade: The Fifth Sheldon Collection (2008) ISBN 978-0-9655060-7-6
- Living Dangerously With Saturated Fats: The Sixth Sheldon Collection (2009) ISBN 978-0-9655060-8-3
- Still Got It: The Seventh Sheldon Collection (2009) ISBN 978-0-9655060-9-0
- Delightful Jokes for High-Class Folks: The Eighth Sheldon Collection (2010) ISBN 978-0-9844190-1-2
- In It to Swim It: The Ninth Sheldon Collection (2020) ISBN 978-1-7331266-1-8
- Pal Times for Pals: The Tenth Sheldon Collection (2020) ISBN 978-1-7331266-2-5
- Get It Together, Pickles: A Sheldon Collection (2024) ISBN 978-1-7331266-6-3

=== Sheldon Comics (Themed) ===
Collections of Sheldon comics curated by theme include:

- Pugs: God's Little Weirdos (2008) ISBN 978-0-9655060-6-9
- Literature: Unsuccessfully Competing Against TV Since 1953 (2010) ISBN 978-0-9844190-0-5
- Coffee: It's What's For Dinner (2011) ISBN 978-0-9844190-2-9
- Pugs: They Think They're People (…Old, Retired People) (2012) ISBN 978-0-9844190-1-2
- Pugs Unleashed (2018) ISBN 978-0-9844190-6-7
- Pop Culture (2019) ISBN 978-0-9844190-8-1
- Double Dog Dare (2026) ISBN 979-8-9937927-0-5

=== Drive Comic ===
The Drive comics series chronologically-collected include:

- Drive: Act 1 (2017) ISBN 978-0-9844190-3-6
- Drive: Act 2 (2018) ISBN 978-0-9844190-7-4
- Drive: Act 3 (2021) ISBN 978-1-7331266-3-2
- Drive: Act 4 (2024) ISBN 978-1-7331266-7-0

=== Anatomy of Books ===
Funny illustrations with made-up facts collected by theme include:

- Anatomy of Animals (2017) ISBN 978-0-9844190-5-0
- Anatomy of Authors (2019) ISBN 978-1-7331266-0-1
- Anatomy of Dinosaurs (2022) ISBN 978-1-7331266-5-6
- Anatomy of Dogs (2025) ISBN 978-1-7331266-9-4

He also co-authored the book How to Make Webcomics (2008) with Brad Guigar, Scott Kurtz, and Kris Straub. Around the same time, the quartet hosted the podcast Webcomics Weekly (2007–2011). Kellett deliberately self-publishes many of his books under the publishing name Small Fish Studios. The editions are financed with great success through Kickstarter.

== Acting and other projects ==
Kellett was a part of the sketch comedy group And Donkey Makes Five from Los Angeles, California. He also performed in Comedy Central's South Beach Comedy Festival in Miami in 2009. Kellett has performed on stage in Skirts and Flirts in New York and in Los Angeles. He also performed in Der Inka von Peru at the George Wood Theatre in London. In 2025 Kellett was one of three co-hosts for The Wrong Way show on YouTube.

=== ComicLab ===
Since 2018 Kellett has co-hosted the podcast ComicLab with fellow cartoonist Brad Guigar. It's aimed at comic professionals and semi-professionals, marketed as a show "about making comics — and making a living from comics!" As of May 2026 there are 440 episodes of ComicLab available on Spotify with a rating of 4.9. An additional 437 exclusive Pro Tips episodes are available through a paid Patreon subscription.
