= Drive: the scifi comic =

Weekly webcomic by Dave Kellett

drive: the scifi comic
- Author: Dave Kellett
- Website: official Drive site
- Current status/schedule: Updating weekly
- Launch date: August 15, 2009 (first post)

drive: the scifi comic, more commonly referred to as simply Drive, is a weekly webcomic created by Dave Kellett.

Drive began as a "Saturday Sci-Fi" storyline on the popular webcomic site, Sheldon.

The strip is inked in shades of blue and is typically organized into several rows of panels per page.

== Plot synopsis ==
Drive is a space opera that takes place in the year 2401. The strip tells the story of the second Spanish Empire—a galactic empire—and its war with a race called "The Continuum of Makers". The story follows the crew of the Machito, who have been press-ganged into a unique mission by an emperor they despise. As the storyline advances, their mission ripples out in ways neither they nor the Emperor could imagine, to impact the fate of both warring races.

== Characters ==
Nosh: The Machito's Science Officer. Nosh is a Veetan (a burly, yet pacifistic Alien race) who learned to speak English while in Russia.

Skitter: The Machito's Pilot. A small alien with amnesia—and a gift for guiding a ship through "pinched space" that could give the Empire an advantage in its war with the Continuum-achieved by sensing gravity wave movements through his mohawk head-crest. Nosh gave Skitter his working name.

Fernando ('Nando) Cruz: The Machito's 14-year-old head of engineering, and member of "La Familia" (the Empire's Spanish Royal Family).

Cuddow: A Fillipod (an insect-like race) from the planet Tesskil. Cuddow was the senior adviser to Tesskils leader. He joined the crew when he fled the planet during a Continuum attack.

Captain Taneel: Described as an "unhappy grandmother captain," she is in charge of the Machito.

Orla O'Malley: A xenobiologist assigned to the Machito by the Emperor, and also secretly a member of "La Familia".

Emperor Cruz: Member of "La Familia" who committed regicide by killing his uncle to take up the throne. Commands the Human/Veetan empire and "La Grande y Felicissima Armada" (the Navy).

Los Tres Primos: A trio of "La Familia" cousins who have rebelled against their upbringing and strive to bring equality to the downtrodden people of the Empire. They move in secret using a stolen ship- piloted by another member of Skitters' unknown species.

== Enemies ==
The Continuum Of Makers: A race of highly-intelligent aliens who value their inventions (which they refer to as "spirits") above all else. As such, they have declared humanity guilty of "spirit-theft" for using the Ring Drive salvaged from one of their crashed ships.

The Vinn: A collection of alien races united by an artificial parasite that gives each Vinn a tattoo-like patch over one eye along with several other biological enhancements. Vinn are determined to spread across the universe as part of an ongoing search for "the Missing Gods" that led to their creation.

== 3D representations ==
Some fans have made three-dimensional renderings of the spaceships featured in the comic.

In January 2010, Patrick Johns, the author of the webcomic Stickfodder, posted the first of such renderings to his Flickr account and, subsequently, to Dave Kellett's Sheldon Talk forums. In response to the forum post, Dave Kellett encouraged other 3D artists to "take a crack at it."

Three months later, a Drive fan with the screen name Maxwell posted a rendering of the Emperor's ship to the Sheldon Talk forums.

In May, 2010, visual effects student Dan Taubert created a 1-minute animation that features several Drive ships at a Denny's in the sky as well as the Emperor's ship and the Machito in space. Taubert published the progress of his DRIVE 3D Visualization project to his personal website, while he posted the final animation on Vimeo.

== Critical reception ==
On his way to Comic-Con 2010, Gary Tyrrell, author of the webcomic blog Fleen, indicated the first collection of Drive comics (Drive – A Hero Rises) was a must-buy saying it would be "purchased by [him] and probably should be by you". He also indicated he has been "digging" Drive and "[couldn't] wait to get [his] hands on this first collection".

In a review of Drive published on September 19, 2010, Jeff Kapalka of The Post-Standard newspaper out of Syracuse, New York, described the strip as having "taken ... time to set up [the] universe and populate it with a variety of interesting individuals. The story is serious. The characters are hilarious." He also praised Kellett in the crafting of this comic saying, "It's a fine wire he's walking. Telling a continued story at a rate of one page a week is almost a lost art. Making it funny while not being able to reference modern pop culture makes it even more difficult. Kellett succeeds at both."

Mike Braff, a columnist for Del Rey Books' Suvudu site, published a review of Drive on January 30, 2011. He spoke highly concerning the thought and planning Kellett has put into the comic saying, "Unlike most webcomics, which seem to be made up on the fly, ... Drive definitely has a story to tell and I, for one, am excited to hear it." After giving a brief synopsis of the story, Mr. Braff went on to praise the workmanship of the narrative, indicating that "the ideas, themes, and environments presented in Drive are fantastic and make the universe feel very broad".
