= Scott Kurtz =

American cartoonist

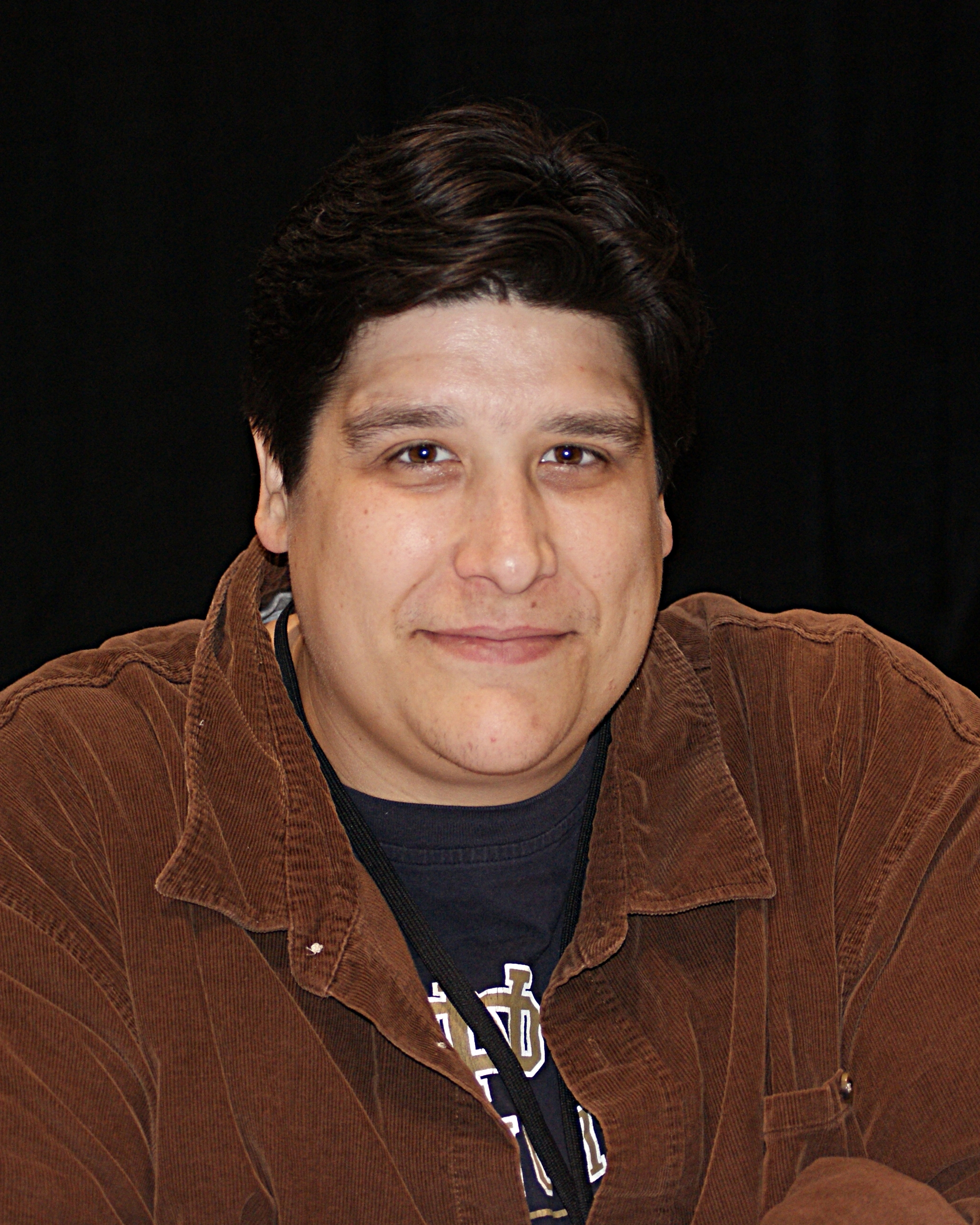
- Kurtz at the Calgary Comic & Entertainment Expo in 2011
- Born: Scott R. Kurtz; March 15, 1971 (age 55) Watsonville, California
- Areas: Cartoonist, Writer, Penciller, Artist, Inker, Editor, Publisher
- Notable works: PvP

Scott R. Kurtz (born March 15, 1971) is an American webcomic artist. Known for creating the daily online comic-strip PvP, Kurtz is among the first professional webcomic creators.

== Career ==
Kurtz was born to a Catholic household in Watsonville, California. He attended the University of North Texas where he created and published a daily comic strip Captain Amazing in the North Texas Daily, the student newspaper. It ran for four semesters. His first work on the internet were comics related to the MMORPG game Ultima Online called "Samwise" and later "Tales by Tavernlight." Scott also produced a comic about his life as a newlywed called "Wedlock" for the early subscription comics site Modern Tales. Kurtz also co-wrote the comic Truth, Justin and the American way with Aaron Williams.

He launched PvP May 4, 1998, for a gaming website (MPOG.COM). In June 1999, Kurtz retooled the strip and re-launched it. In March 2000, he launched a print version as a bi-monthly for Dork Storm Press. After publishing the print version of PvP for eight years through Image Comics, he began self-publishing, citing a natural readership decline of the print version and an increase of the online version. His self-publishing company, Toonhound Studios LLC, was a Texas entity with operations in Seattle.

Kurtz created a spin-off webcomic of PvP in 2013, entitled Table Titans. He also co-wrote The Trenches with Jerry Holkins and Mike Krahulik. The Trenches was a comic about working in the video game industry which ran from 2011 to 2016. His webcomics career began to slow down in 2018 when his father suffered disabling strokes and he became a caregiver, although he channelled some of his feelings and experiences into the short webcomic 'Mort'. PVP went on hiatus in February 2022. In March 2024 he published the first volume of a graphic novel series set in the world of Table Titans with Holiday House.

Kurtz played the character Dwarven Fighter Binwin Bronzebottom in Acquisitions Incorporated, a Dungeons & Dragons-themed actual play podcast and live show. In 2013, Kurtz collaborated with Kris Straub to write and produce an animated series for ShiftyLook based on the video game Mappy, titled Mappy: The Beat, with Kurtz also voicing several characters.

Kurtz lived in Little Elm, Texas until his move to Seattle in 2010, where he worked from the Penny Arcade offices for over a year. He now works from home.

== Nominations & awards ==
- 2005: Nominated, Eisner Award, Best Writer/Artist—Humor — Image Comics, PvP
- 2005: Eagle Award, Favourite Web-based Comic - PvP
- 2006: Eisner Award, Best Digital Comic — PvP
- 2010: Harvey Award, Best Online Comic Work — PvP

== Selected publications ==
- How to Make Web Comics, by Brad J. Guigar, Dave Kellett, Scott Kurtz, Kris Straub, Image Comics (2008) OCLC 173719846 ISBN 9781582408705
