= Brad Guigar =

American cartoonist

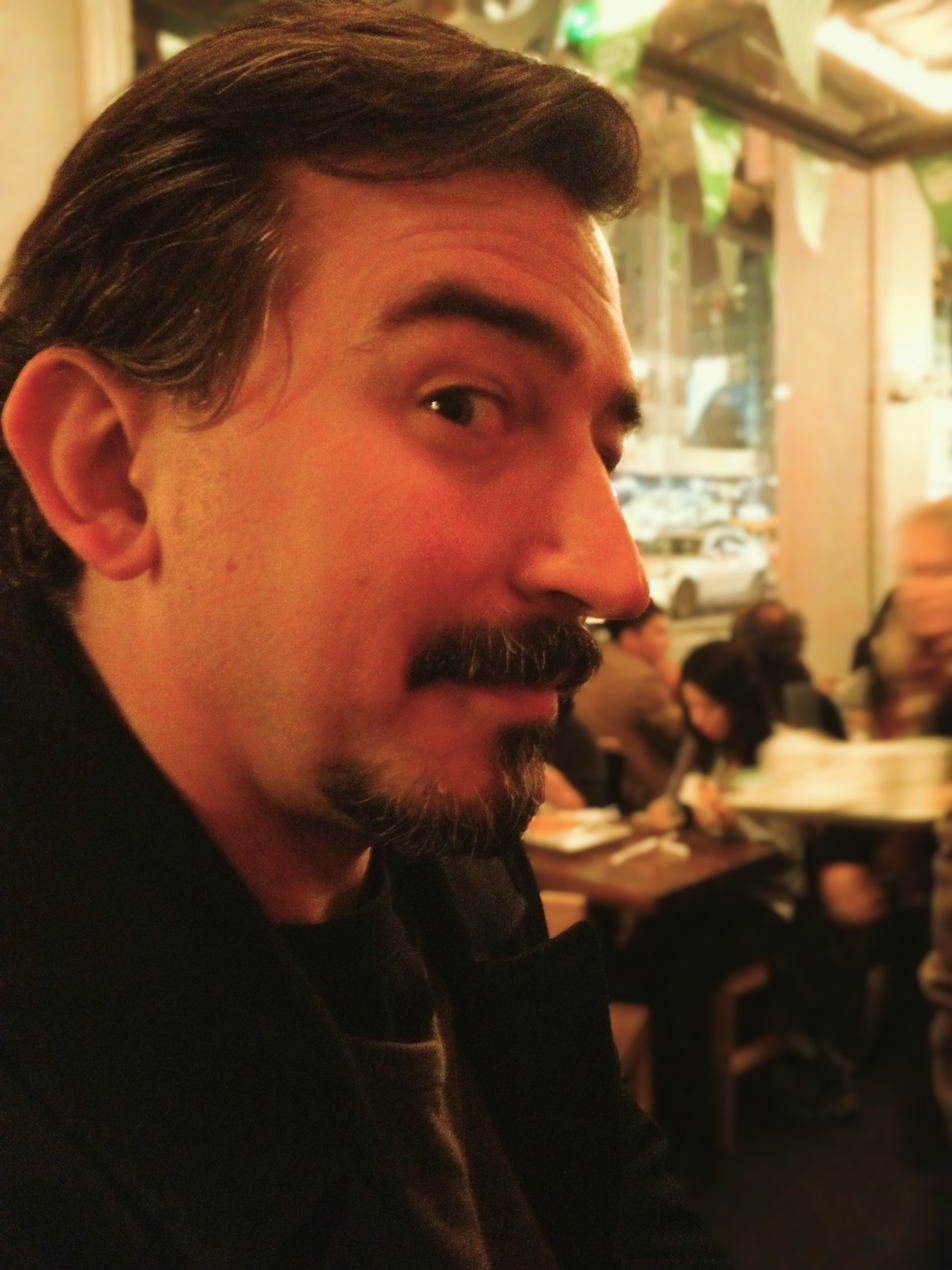
- Born: April 9, 1969 (age 57)
- Areas: Cartoonist, Writer, Penciller, Inker, Publisher
- Notable works: Evil Inc.; The Webcomics Handbook
- Collaborators: Dave Kellett, ComicLab podcast
- Awards: Ringo Award, Best Humor Webcomic

- Alma College ('91)

Brad Guigar's voice
recorded January 2014

Brad Guigar (/ˈɡaɪɡər/, GY-gər; born April 9, 1969) is the cartoonist of Evil Inc, the editor of The Webcomics Handbook on Substack, and a co-host of the podcast ComicLab. He has been nominated for various Reubens, an Eisner, and won a Ringo Award.

== Early life ==
Brad Guigar is the eldest of five children and grew up in Bad Axe, Michigan. He attended Alma College where he received a Bachelor of Fine Arts degree before he moved to Canton, Ohio to work for the newspaper The Repository as a graphic artist and editorial cartoonist. He left The Repository and moved to Akron, Ohio and worked for the Akron Beacon Journal. He formerly worked at the Philadelphia Daily News and is married with two children. Guigar wrote and illustrated The Everything Cartooning Book (2004), contributed to the book How To Make Webcomics (2008), wrote its sequel The Webcomics Handbook (2014), and maintains the site Webcomics.com.

== Career ==
=== Greystone Inn ===
Greystone Inn premiered on the Web on February 14, 2000. Later that year, the strip was added to the Keenspot line-up of webcomics. After updating daily for over five years, Guigar took his comics, including Greystone, to Blank Label Comics. Greystone Inn appeared in the Philadelphia Daily News, the Turlock Journal, the Stanford Daily and The Maine Campus. Selected Greystone Inn strips on graphic design also appeared in the Computer Arts magazine every issue. Guigar makes money off his syndications by offering Greystone Inn for syndication at a certain rate, with a lower rate offered for college papers.

Greystone Inn has had a spin-off comic written and drawn by Brad Guigar named Mondays With Mel. It featured an old comedian named Mel who had been introduced in Greystone Inn as an old friend of Argus's. It worked by Mel setting up a joke and then allowing the audience to provide punchlines with the best one being featured in the strip. Since Guigar left Keenspot, Mondays With Mel has been on hiatus and is no longer available online.

In May 2005 Guigar ended Greystone Inn and began a spin-off, Evil Inc, which focuses on a company of super-villains. Evil Inc retains several Greystone Inn characters and has a similar style.

=== Courting Disaster ===
Courting Disaster is a single panel cartoon about love, sex, and dating. It originally appeared every Friday in the Philadelphia Daily News accompanying a sex advice column. In 2015 Courting Disaster was revived for occasional release as a Not Safe For Work comic available to certain Patreon subscribers.

=== Phables ===
Phables was a comic strip about life in Philadelphia that appeared bi-weekly in the Philadelphia Daily News from 2006 to 2009. In May 2007 the strip was named "Best Local Column" by the Philadelphia chapter of the Society of Professional Journalists. Later in 2007, the strip was also nominated for the Eisner Award for Best Digital Comic.

=== Evil Inc ===
A spin-off from Guigar's previous project, Greystone Inn, Evil Inc debuted on the web on June 22, 2005. The strip chronicles the schemes and adventures of the eponymous Evil Incorporated, a business run by supervillains. One of the launch strips for Blank Label Comics until becoming part of the Halfpixel lineup, it appeared daily in newspapers until 2015. Visually, Evil Inc started in black and white but soon transitioned into color. Most strips are formed of a series of panels which use a multitude of camera angles.

The comic follows strong story arcs. In one, the corporation was bought, and subsequently brought to financial ruin, by the Legion of Justice (a parody of the Justice League and similar teams). However, the ruination of Evil Inc also spelled doom for the Legion. Each strip maintains a self-contained joke, often uses puns, and frequently parodies superhero comics.

Saturday strips are usually unconnected to weekday strips (the strip does not update on Sundays) and include such themes as Evil Inc character profiles called "Personnel Files" (which describe a specific Evil Inc character, usually one featured in the previous week), customer service calls fielded by Lightning Lady (who answers the phone "Evil Inc, how may I harm you?", previously "How may I misdirect your call?"), or, recently, various characters approaching a door that has been altered to complement the sign next to it (for example, the December 4, 2010 strip shows a door labeled "Office of Bizarro"; in this strip, the doorknob is placed next to the door rather than on it).

On January 1, 2016, Evil Inc was rebooted as a graphic novel, leaving behind the comic strip format. The storyline was also rebooted and included among the changes:

- The story’s main focus became a branch office of the Evil Inc corporation instead of the monolithic headquarters.
- Miss Match and Captain Heroic were no longer married.
- Their sons, Oscar and Oliver, were removed completely.
- Evil Atom was replaced as CEO by Dr. Whoosh.
- The characters no longer aged in real-time.
- Several new characters were introduced.

=== Evil Inc After Dark ===
In June 2015 Guigar launched Evil Inc After Dark on Patreon as an NSFW spin-off of the main Evil Inc comic. After Dark content is exclusive to paying fans and continues romantic Evil Inc plot points via sex-positive forays into characters' bedrooms.

=== Webcomics.com ===
Webcomics.com is an advice site run by Guigar which includes tutorials, community discussion, and job information relating to comics. Guigar also co-authored the book How to Make Webcomics (2008) with Dave Kellett, Scott Kurtz, and Kris Straub. Around the same time, the quartet hosted the podcast Webcomics Weekly (2007-2011).

=== ComicLab ===
Since 2018 Guigar has co-hosted the podcast ComicLab with fellow cartoonist Dave Kellett. It's aimed at comic professionals and semi-professionals, marketed as a show "about making comics — and making a living from comics!" As of May 2026 there are 440 episodes of ComicLab available on Spotify with a rating of 4.9. An additional 437 exclusive Pro Tips episodes are available through a paid Patreon subscription.

In 2025 Guigar was one of three co-hosts for The Wrong Way show on YouTube.

== Awards & Honors ==
=== Ringos ===
- 2026: Nominated, Ringo Award, Best Humor Webcomic — Evil Inc
- 2023: Won, Ringo Award, Best Humor Webcomic — Evil Inc

=== Eisners ===
- 2007: Nominated, Eisner Award, Best Digital Comic - Phables

=== Reubens ===
- 2025: Nominated, Reuben Award, Online Comics: Long Form — Evil Inc
- 2023: Nominated, Reuben Award, Online Comics: Long Form — Evil Inc
- 2022: Nominated, Reuben Award, Online Comics: Long Form — Evil Inc

=== Additional Honors ===
- 2012: Won, Philadelphia Geek Award, Comic Book Artist of the Year
- 2007: Won, Society of Professional Journalists (Philadelphia), Best Local Column - Phables
- 2007: Nominated, Web Cartoonists' Choice Awards, Outstanding Superhero/Action Comic — Evil Inc

== Bibliography ==
Guigar has authored the following books and series.

- Phables (2014) ISBN 978-0-9815209-1-9
- NSFW: The Erotic Art of Brad Guigar (2020) ISBN 978-0-9989932-6-3

=== Greystone Inn ===
The Greystone Inn comics series include:

- Dilutions of Grandeur, Greystone Inn Vol. 1 (2003) ISBN 978-1-929462-25-4
- Come on Now, That Was Funny, Greystone Inn Vol. 2 (2003) ISBN 978-1-929462-51-3
- The Show must Go On (and on...), Greystone Inn Vol. 3 (2003)
- Counting Wrongs, Greystone Inn Vol. 4 (2005) ISBN 978-1-4116-6219-3
- Lightning Lady (2005) ISBN 978-1-4116-6221-6
- Prodromal Teeth - and Other Perils of Pregnancy & Parenthood (2005) ISBN 978-1-4116-6223-0
- The Complete Greystone Inn (2010)

=== Tales From the Con ===
Guigar co-created Tales From the Con with Chris Giarrusso and Scott "Scoot" McMahon, published through Image Comics.

- Tales From the Con: Year One (2014)
- Tales From the Con: Year Two (2015)
- The Complete Tales From the Con (2017) ISBN 978-1-5343-0100-9

=== Courting Disaster ===
The Courting Disaster comics series chronologically-collected include:

- Courting Disaster Vol 1 (2006)
- Courting Disaster Vol 2 (2008)
- Courting Disaster Vol 3 (2009)
- Courting Disaster Vol 4 (2013)
- Courting Disaster Uncensored (2017) ISBN 978-0-9989932-0-1

=== Evil Inc ===
The Evil Inc comics series chronologically-collected include:

- Evil Inc Annual Report 2005: Vol 1 (2014) ISBN 978-1-4116-8070-8
- Evil Inc Annual Report: Vol 2 (2014) ISBN 978-0-615-13620-2
- Evil Inc Annual Report: Vol 3 (2015) ISBN 978-0-9815209-0-2
- Evil Inc Annual Report: Vol 4 (2015) ISBN 978-0-9815209-2-6
- Evil Inc Annual Report: Vol 5 (2015) ISBN 978-0-9815209-3-3
- Evil Inc Annual Report: Vol 6 - Secret Scrawl Invasion (2015) ISBN 978-0-9815209-4-0
- Evil Inc: Vol 7 - When Worlds Collide (2015) ISBN 978-0-9815209-5-7
- Evil Inc: Vol 8 - Without Great Power (2015) ISBN 978-0-9815209-7-1
- Evil Inc: Vol 9 - The Ruby of Ragnoor (2016) ISBN 978-0-9815209-8-8
- Evil Inc - Under New Management (2018) ISBN 978-0-9989932-3-2
- Evil Inc - Power Couple (2024) ISBN 978-0-9989932-8-7

=== Evil Inc After Dark ===
The Evil Inc After Dark comics series chronologically-collected include:

- Evil Inc After Dark: Live Fast, Thwart Hard (2017) ISBN 978-0-9815209-9-5
- Evil Inc After Dark: Stick 'Em Up (2020) ISBN 978-0-9989932-5-6
- Evil Inc After Dark: Middle Management (2024) ISBN 978-0-9989932-9-4
- Evil Inc After Dark: Full Stream Ahead (2025) ISBN 979-8-9937266-0-1

=== How-To Books ===
Guigar has also published books focusing on comics creation and business:

- The Everything Cartooning Book: Create Unique And Inspired Cartoons For Fun And Profit (2004) ISBN 978-1-4405-2305-2
- How to Make Webcomics (2008) ISBN 978-1-58240-870-5 with Dave Kellett, Scott Kurtz, and Kris Straub
- The Webcomics Handbook: The Cartoonist's Guide to Working in the Digital Age (2014) ISBN 978-0-9815209-6-4

== Charitable work ==
As a member of Alternative Brand Studios, Brad Guigar ran the AltBrand 2002 MDA Webcomic Telethon. It featured over 20 comic artists and raised $850.

As a founding member of Blank Label Comics, Guigar also spearheaded the 2005 Webcomic Telethon for Hurricane Relief that raised an estimated $28,635 for the American Red Cross response to hurricanes Katrina and Rita.
