= Jerry Holkins =

American writer and co-creator of Penny Arcade

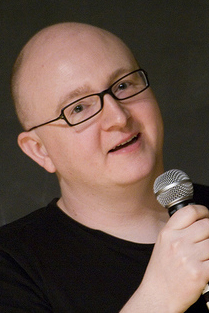
- Holkins in 2009
- Born: Keith Gerald Parkinson; February 6, 1976 (age 50); Auburn, Washington, U.S.
- Occupation: Writer
- Writing career
- Years active: 1999–present
- Genre: Cartoonist
- Notable work: Penny Arcade

Jerry Holkins (born Keith Gerald Parkinson on February 6, 1976) is an American writer. He is the co-creator and writer of the webcomic Penny Arcade along with its artist Mike Krahulik. Holkins sometimes uses the pseudonym "Tycho Brahe", which is also the name of a Penny Arcade character based on Holkins.

Holkins is a co-founder of PAX (originally called the Penny Arcade Expo) a series of gaming festivals that began in 2004 and has been held around the world. He is also a co-founder of Child's Play, a multimillion-dollar charity which organizes toy drives for children's hospitals.

Holkins, along with Krahulik, was included in the Time 100 for 2010.

== Early life ==
Holkins was born in Auburn, Washington and grew up at least partly in Spokane, Washington. He met future collaborator Mike Krahulik at Mead High School, Spokane in 1993 or 1994 through the school newspaper, where they became friends. After graduating high school, Holkins and Krahulik shared an apartment together. Holkins moved to Seattle around 2000.

His online handle "Tycho Brahe" was named after a Danish astronomer Tycho Brahe.

== Career ==
=== Penny Arcade ===
Holkins created the webcomic Penny Arcade in 1998 with Mike Krahulik, with Holkins writing and Krahulik illustrating. The title of the comic is suggested by himself. According to an oral history, the two submitted cartoons to a contest run by a magazine in 1998. The magazine did not accept them but the creators sought other places to publish them, and worked with a site called looneygames.com to create what would become Penny Arcade. The strip initially ran once a week. Around a year later, they created their own website for the strip. In addition to the comic, Holkins wrote accompanying blog posts. Initially, this was partly because the format of their website left blank space. Holkins says that while now the posts are a key part of the site, when they first started he would delete each post to make space for the next one so the early posts are lost. These posts are often computer and video game commentary, but also include personal reflections or rants.

According to Julia Swan of the Museum of History and Innovation, Penny Arcade was one of the first, if not the first, highly successful webcomics. By 2000, Penny Arcade was profitable enough that Holkins could quit his day job. As of 2010, the strip was running three times a week and had about 3.5 million readers.

Holkins is also the basis for one of the two central characters in Penny Arcade, "Tycho Brahe". Holkins and Brahe share similar interests and personalities, though their appearances differ; for example, Tycho has mussed hair and sideburns, while Holkins's head is shaven.

=== Child's Play ===
Holkins, along with Krahulik and their business manager Robert Khoo, founded the charity Child's Play in 2003. Child's Play is a charitable organization that donates toys and games to children's hospitals worldwide. The charity was founded in part to refute mainstream media's perception of gamers as violent and antisocial.

=== PAX gaming conventions ===
PAX (originally known as Penny Arcade Expo) is a series of gaming culture festivals involving tabletop, arcade, and video gaming. PAX is held annually in Seattle, Boston, Philadelphia, and San Antonio in the United States; and Melbourne in Australia.

PAX was originally created in 2004 by Holkins and Krahulik because they wanted to attend a show exclusively for gaming. Defining characteristics of the shows include an opening keynote speech from an industry insider, game-culture inspired concerts, panels on game topics, exhibitor booths from both independent and major game developers and publishers, a LAN party multiplayer, tabletop gaming tournaments, and video game freeplay areas.

=== Other work ===
Holkins and Krahulik played Dungeons & Dragons 4th edition in Seattle for a day prior to its release, with Krahulik, Chris Perkins from Wizards of the Coast, Scott Kurtz of PvP, and Wil Wheaton. Jerry is also featured in the 4th edition and 5th edition Dungeons & Dragons actual play series Acquisitions Incorporated, playing a character named Omin Dran, a Cleric of the Goddess Tymora (formerly Avandra), and CEO of an adventuring party named Acquisitions Incorporated. This has expanded into another streamed game entitled Acquisitions Incorporated: The "C" Team. In 2019, this work led to the official Acquisitions Incorporated sourcebook featuring the series' concept and characters.

Holkins wrote The Lookouts, a comic which imagines a Boy Scouts-like group in a fantasy setting. Initial versions were written by Holkins and illustrated by Krahulik, while the final version was also co-written by Ben McCool, with art done by Robb Mommaerts and colors by Rainer Petter. The premise has also been adapted into a short live-action film.

Holkins wrote a book of poetry called Lexcalibur, featuring poems about D&D-style adventuring with illustrations by Krahulik.

Holkins created a fictional fantasy series called "Epic Legends of the Hierarchs: The Elemenstor Saga" as a parody of generic fantasy fiction, and created a wiki for others to make up lore and backstory for the series. It rapidly grew in size as Penny Arcade fans joined in expanding the parody to describe the non-existent books, spinoffs, and life of the author.

== Writing style ==
A review of Penny Arcade in 1Up.com said of Holkins, "Language itself, whether dirty or clean, is increasingly a focus [of the comic] as Holkins stretches himself to work his favored baroque dialogue and unusual words into the script."

== Personal life ==
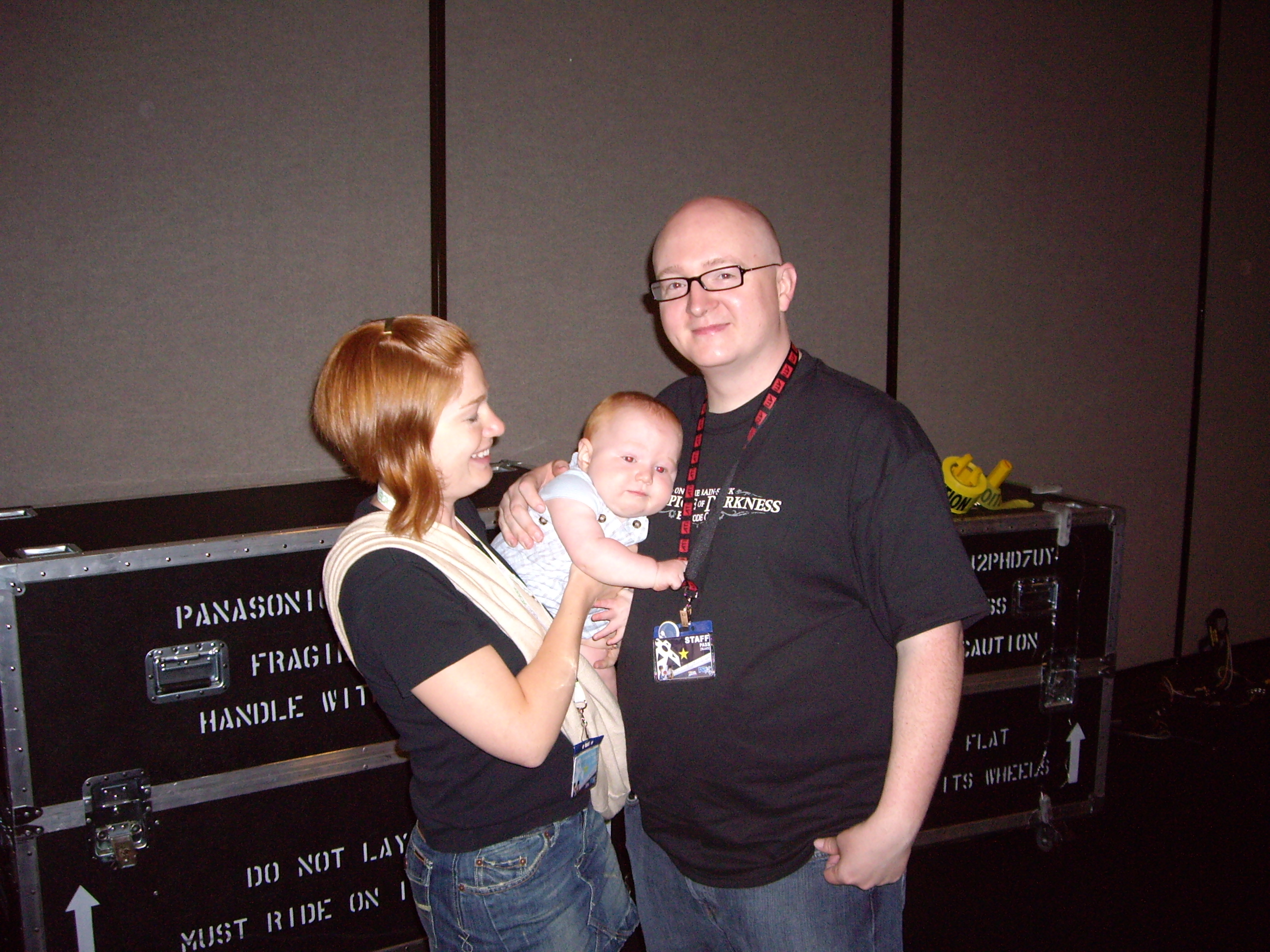
Jerry Holkins, his wife Brenna, and their daughter Samantha at PAX 2006

Holkins is married to his wife Brenna. They have two daughters, Samantha and Ronia. In a tweet, Holkins said that his surname "is a combination of Holcomb (hers) and Parkinson (mine)." Old versions of the Penny Arcade site credit the work to "Mike Krahulik and Jerry Parkinson".

Holkins said in his Penny Arcade Podcast that he sings and plays guitar in the band The Fine Print, and that his band once opened for the band Anal Cunt.

== Bibliography ==
- with Krahulik, Mike (2001). Year One: A Penny Arcade Retrospective. KiwE Publishing, Ltd.
- with Krahulik, Mike (2006). Penny Arcade: Attack of the Bacon Robots. Dark Horse.
- with Krahulik, Mike (2006). Penny Arcade: Epic Legends of the Magic Sword Kings. Dark Horse.
- with Krahulik, Mike (2007). Penny Arcade: The Warsun Prophecies. Dark Horse.
- with Krahulik, Mike (2007). Penny Arcade: Birds Are Weird. Dark Horse.
- with Krahulik, Mike (2008). Penny Arcade: The Case of the Mummy's Gold. Dark Horse.
- with Krahulik, Mike (2010). Penny Arcade: The Halls Below. Del Rey. ISBN 9780345512260.
- with Krahulik, Mike (2010). The Splendid Magic of Penny Arcade: The 11½th Anniversary Edition. Del Rey. ISBN 9780345512260.
- with Krahulik, Mike (2011). Penny Arcade: Be Good Little Puppy. Del Rey. ISBN 9780345512260.
- with Krahulik, Mike (2017). Lexcalibur. Del Rey. ISBN 9780997161915.
- with Krahulik, Mike (2022). Lexcalibur II. Del Rey. ISBN 9780997161939.
