= Mike Krahulik =

American webcomic artist (born 1977)

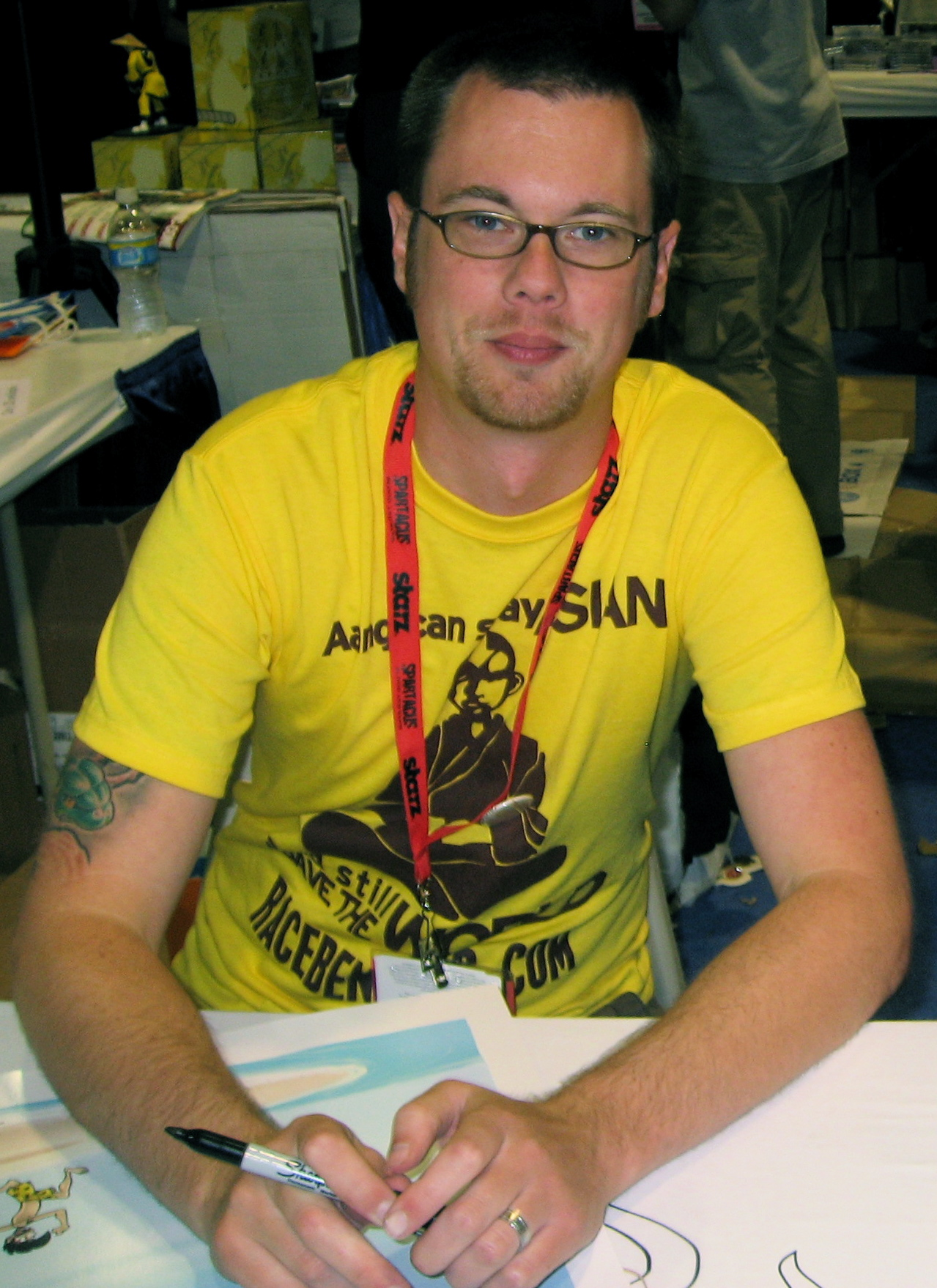
- Krahulik at the 2009 ComicCon
- Born: Michael Krahulik; September 25, 1977 (age 49)
- Area: Cartoonist
- Pseudonyms: Jonathan Gabriel, Gabe
- Notable works: Penny Arcade

Michael Krahulik (/krəˈhuːlɪk/; born September 25, 1977) is an American artist for the webcomic Penny Arcade and co-founder with Jerry Holkins of Child's Play, a charity that organizes toy drives for children's hospitals. He goes by the online moniker "Jonathan Gabriel" or "Gabe". Krahulik does not physically resemble his comic strip counterpart, as the character was not originally meant to represent him. He is from Spokane, Washington.

== Work ==
Mike Krahulik credits cartoonist Stephen Silver as a major influence on his drawing style. His style has dramatically changed since he began drawing Penny Arcade in 1998.

Krahulik has done promotional comics for Tom Clancy's Rainbow Six and many other video games. He also provided the illustrations for the cover of Agent to the Stars by John Scalzi. In his early career he contributed artwork to the Daily Victim, a regular feature that used to run on GameSpy, totaling more than 300 illustrations. He has also designed and drawn advertisements, promotional artwork, and pre-order bonuses for several video games, including Assassin's Creed: Revelations, Uncharted 3: Drake's Deception, and others, mostly from Ubisoft. Krahulik and Penny Arcade writer Jerry Holkins have archived these projects and keep them within their web page.

Krahulik also portrays the infamous wizard Jim Darkmagic of the Newhamp Shire Darkmagics (a location deemed much more suitable by gamemaster Chris Perkins than regular New Hampshire) in Acquisitions Incorporated, a Dungeons & Dragons podcast/live show. Through this, he and Holkins had the opportunity to play the new release of Dungeons and Dragons Fourth Edition in Seattle for a day with Chris Perkins from Wizards of the Coast, Scott Kurtz of PvP, and Wil Wheaton.

== Publicity ==
In 2005, anti-video game activist Jack Thompson wrote an open letter ("A Modest Video Game Proposal") in which he said he would donate $10,000 USD if a game developer would create an ultra-violent game whose protagonist murders video game developers. Krahulik responded to Thompson with an email in which he said that he and fellow gamers had raised about half a million dollars toward charity. Krahulik later said, "Jack actually just called and screamed at me for a couple minutes. He said if I email him again I will 'regret it'. What a violent man." After a group of developers made such a game (2006's "I'm O.K – A Murder Simulator"), Thompson refused to make the donation, calling the game subpar and saying that his proposal was satirical, not serious. Krahulik and the Penny Arcade staff then donated $10,000 to the Entertainment Software Association with the note, "For Jack Thompson, because Jack Thompson won't".

Along with Holkins, Krahulik was included on the 2010 Time 100 for their work on Penny Arcade.

In 2010, Krahulik and Penny Arcade were criticized for several comics and statements about the transgender community and rape, particularly in response to a comic featuring fictional creatures known as "dickwolves." Krahulik and Holkins dismissed these criticisms, later selling "Team Dickwolves" T-shirts. In June 2013, Krahulik apologized and donated $20,000 to LGBTQ youth suicide prevention group The Trevor Project.

In 2011, Krahulik wrote a foreword for the book The Art and Making of Star Wars: The Old Republic, which was about the production of the massively multiplayer online role-playing game Star Wars: The Old Republic.
