= Penny Arcade =

Webcomic by Holkins and Krahulik and its related products

- Author(s): Jerry Holkins; Mike Krahulik
- Website: www.penny-arcade.com
- Current status/schedule: Monday, Wednesday, Friday
- Launch date: November 18, 1998
- Syndicate(s): Penny Arcade, Inc.
- Genre(s): Gaming, humor, satire

Penny Arcade is a webcomic focused on video games and video game culture, written by Jerry Holkins and illustrated by Mike Krahulik. The comic debuted in 1998 on the website loonygames.com. Since then, Holkins and Krahulik have established their own site, which is typically updated with a new comic strip each Monday, Wednesday, and Friday. The comics are accompanied by regular updates on the site's blog.

By 2005, Penny Arcade was among the most popular and longest running webcomics online, listed in 2010 as having 3.5 million readers. Holkins and Krahulik were among the first webcomic creators successful enough to make a living from their work. In addition to the comic, Holkins and Krahulik also created Child's Play, a children's charity; PAX, a gaming convention; Penny Arcade TV, a YouTube channel; Pinny Arcade, a pin exchange; and the episodic video game Penny Arcade Adventures: On the Rain-Slick Precipice of Darkness with Hothead Games and Zeboyd Games.

== Overview ==
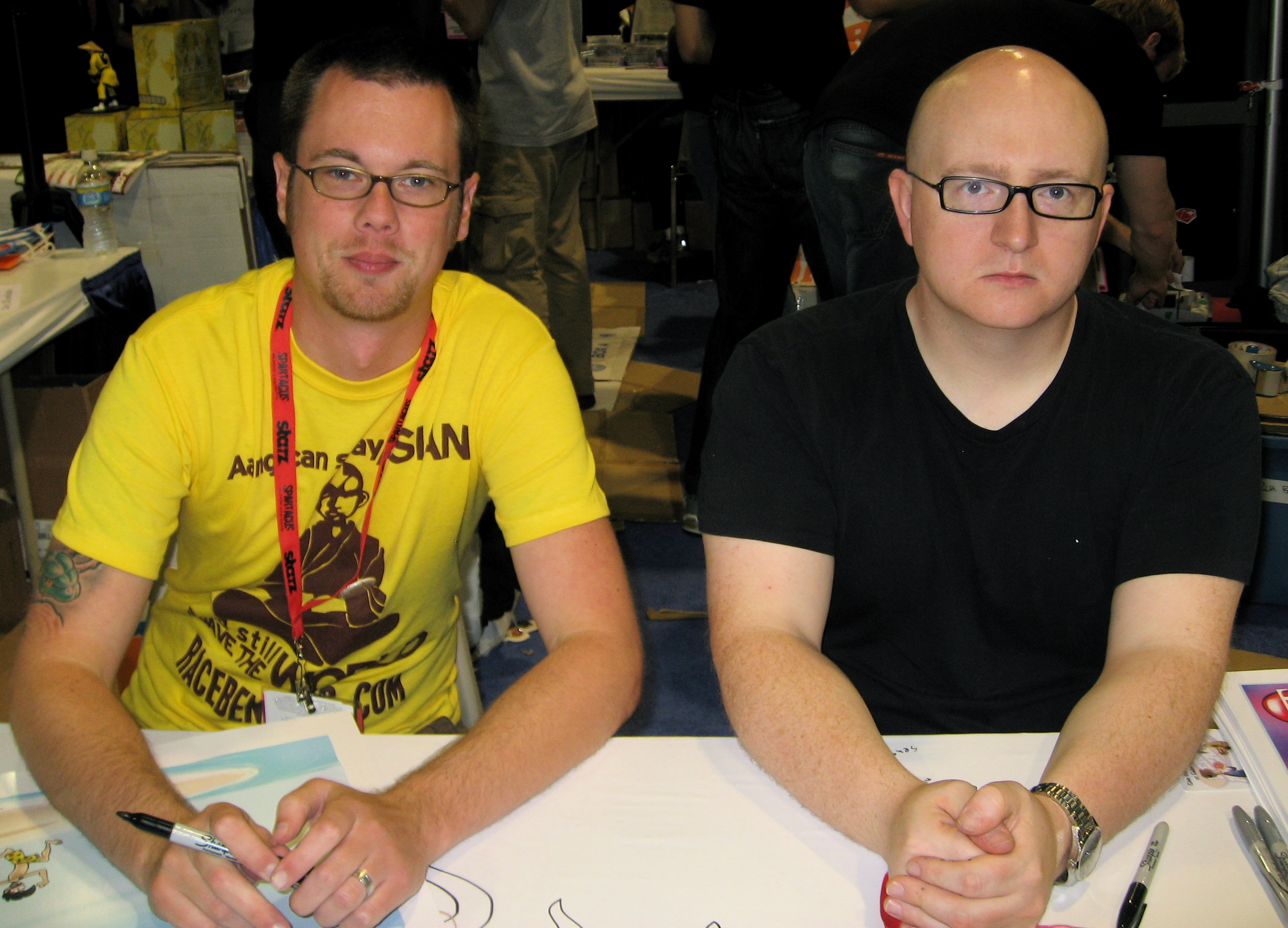
Mike Krahulik (left) and Jerry Holkins (right) at Comic-Con 2009

The strip features Krahulik and Holkins' cartoon alter egos, John "Gabe" Gabriel and Tycho Brahe, respectively. While often borrowing from the authors' experiences, Holkins and Krahulik do not treat them as literal avatars or caricatures of themselves. The two characters spend much of their time playing and commenting on both computer and video games, which forms the basis of the humor in the strip. Most of the time Gabe serves the purpose of the comic and Tycho the comic foil. The strip can feature in-jokes that are explained in the news posts accompanying each comic, written by the authors.

Both Krahulik and Holkins make a living from Penny Arcade, placing them in a small group of professional webcomic artists devoted to their creations full-time. Originally, like many webcomics, Penny Arcade was supported solely by donations. A graph on the main page indicated how many people had donated that month. After hiring Robert Khoo as their business manager, Holkins and Krahulik switched to a different income stream based on advertising and merchandise revenue alone. According to Holkins, the website handled more than two million pageviews daily (excluding forum traffic) in 2006. On November 13, 2005, the website was redesigned in celebration of their seventh year running and to match the designs of the Child's Play Charity and Penny Arcade Expo websites. Afterwards, the site has been redesigned multiple times.

== Attributes of the comic strip ==
As a (primarily) topical video gaming news comic, there is little plot or general continuity in Penny Arcade strips. Any story sustained for longer than a single strip is referred to as "dreaded continuity", something of a running gag in the newsposts. A character who dies a violent death in one strip will come back in the next, perfectly whole, though occasionally these deaths have an effect on later comics. For example, often, when Gabe kills Tycho or vice versa, the killer takes a certain Pac-Man watch off the dead character, but only if he currently has the watch. Profanity and violence are common in Penny Arcade and the strip is known for its surrealism; zombies, a talking alcoholic DIVX player called Div, Santa Claus, a robotic juicer called the "Fruit Fucker 2000", and Jesus, among others, are known to drop in often and for petty reasons. Other such occurrences are implied, if not shown, such as mentioning Dante from Devil May Cry living in the building next door. However, the comic does occasionally expand into more serious issues; one even had Krahulik, in the guise of the character Gabe, proposing to his girlfriend of two years, while another had both Gabe and Tycho praising Casey Heynes for standing up to bullying.

Some of the strips are drawn from the perspective of fictional characters within a game or movie. Occasionally, Gabe and Tycho are featured as they would be as characters or players in the game themselves, often having some sarcastic remark to make about some feature or bug in the game. At times the comic also depicts meetings between game developers or business people, and features or mocks the reporters of a news article that is commented on in Holkins' newspost.

Penny Arcade has a theme song, "Penny Arcade Theme", written and performed by nerdcore artist MC Frontalot. It was written as a thank-you by Frontalot for the creators of the webcomic linking his website to their front page and declaring him their "rapper laureate" in 2002. The song appears in the dance game In the Groove, released in 2004.

== Protagonists ==
=== Jonathan "Gabe" Gabriel ===
Mike Krahulik's comic alter ego is energetic and free-spirited, but has a propensity to become extremely angry. As a contrast to Tycho's expansive vocabulary, Gabe usually speaks using only simple, common words. He almost always wears a yellow Pac-Man shirt, and has a Pac-Man tattoo on his right arm. His eyes are a shade of slate blue.

He has a fascination with unicorns, a secret love of Barbies, is a dedicated fan of Spider-Man and Star Wars, and has proclaimed "Jessie's Girl" to be the greatest song of all time. He has a wife and son. Gabe is a diabetic, though he continues to consume large quantities of sugar products.

Krahulik named his son "Gabriel" in honor of the character.

=== Tycho Brahe ===
Jerry Holkins' comic alter ego (named after the astronomer Tycho Brahe) is bitter and sarcastic. His eyes are burnt sienna, and he's almost invariably clad in a blue-striped sweater. Tycho enjoys books, role-playing video games, using large and uncommon words in conversation, and deflating Gabe's ego. He is an enthusiastic fan of Harry Potter and Doctor Who. He also plays Dungeons & Dragons often (the website's previous banner illustrated him holding a 20-sided die), and adopts a wildly theatrical style when acting as a dungeon master.

Tycho occasionally makes reference to his scarring childhood, during which his mother physically abused him. Tycho also has a drinking problem.

In Poker Night at the Inventory, Tycho is voiced by Kid Beyond.

== Podcast ==
Krahulik and Holkins had a podcast that they produced from 2006 until 2018, releasing new episodes irregularly. They began to record and release audio content on March 20, 2006, titled Downloadable Content. The podcasts specifically captured the creative process that goes into the creation of a Penny Arcade comic, usually starting with a perusal of recent gaming news, with conversational tangents and digressions to follow. As well as being a behind-the-scenes look at the creation of Penny Arcade, Krahulik and Holkins discussed possible subjects for the comic.

The format of the show was mostly "fly-on-the-wall" style, in that the hosts rarely acknowledged the existence of the microphone. There was no theme music, intro, or outro. The podcasts were of varying lengths, beginning abruptly and ending with the idea for the current comic. New episodes were released irregularly, with six month gaps not uncommon.

Although the shows were initially published weekly, Holkins stated in a May 2006 blog post that they found difficulties when trying to produce the podcasts on a regular basis. The duo planned to keep recording podcasts occasionally.

Since airing the first episode of the new PATV in February 2010, the podcast has not been updated. A new segment has since appeared on PATV called "The Fourth Panel," which presents a fly-on-the-wall look at comics creation much as the podcast did.

On May 8, 2013, Penny Arcade launched a Kickstarter campaign to fund the continuation of Downloadable Content. The kickstarter was successful, with new Podcasts being added each Wednesday. Downloadable Content is "currently on hiatus," with the latest episode dated August 23, 2018.

== Games ==
Penny Arcade Adventures: On the Rain-Slick Precipice of Darkness is an episodic video game based on the strip. The first two episodes were developed by Hothead Games, and were built on a version of the Torque Game Engine. The first episode was released worldwide on May 21, 2008, and the second on October 29, 2008. They were self-published via the PlayStation Network and Xbox Live as well as the PlayGreenhouse.com service created by Penny Arcade to distribute independent games. The game features many elements of the Penny Arcade universe in a 1920s steampunk setting. In 2010, Krahulik and Holkins announced that the remainder of the series had been cancelled, to allow Hothead to focus on other projects. At PAX Prime 2011, however, it was announced that the series would be revived and developed by Zeboyd Games, with a retro style similar to Zeboyd's past titles. The third episode was released on Steam and on Penny Arcade's web store June 25, 2012. The fourth and final episode was announced in January 2013, and released to Steam and Xbox Live in June 2013.

A teaser trailer released by Telltale Games on August 28, 2010, revealed that Tycho would appear in an upcoming game alongside Team Fortress 2's Heavy, Homestar Runner's Strong Bad and Sam & Max's Max. The game, called Poker Night at the Inventory, was released on November 22, 2010. A remaster was released on March 5, 2026.

Two stories that were published on the site were released as motion comics for iOS developed by SRRN Games, "The Last Christmas" in 2010 and "The Hawk and the Hare" in 2011.

The 2008 North American release of Tekken 6 has a skin for Yoshimitsu based on the Cardboard Tube Samurai. In 2012, an official DLC skin pack was released for Dungeon Defenders featuring Tycho, Cardboard Tube Samurai Gabe, Annarchy and Jim Darkmagic skins.

Cryptozoic Entertainment released the licensed deck-building card game Penny Arcade The Game: Gamers Vs. Evil in 2011, and followed it with the expansion pack Penny Arcade The Game: Rumble in R'lyeh in 2012. Playdek released a digital conversion of Penny Arcade The Game: Gamers Vs. Evil for iOS in 2012.

== Penny Arcade: The Series ==
Penny Arcade: The Series first aired online on February 20, 2010. It is a multi-season documentary series based on the exploits of the Penny Arcade company and its founders Krahulik and Holkins. The last episode of the series was posted in September 2015.

== Other works ==
=== Penny Arcade Presents ===
Under the banner of "Penny Arcade Presents", Krahulik and Holkins are sometimes commissioned to create promotional artwork/comic strips for new video games, with their signature artistic style and humor. They are usually credited simply as "Penny Arcade" rather than by their actual names. Some of these works have been included with the distribution of the game, and others have appeared on pre-launch official websites. An official list could be found on the Penny Arcade website. The last of these commissions was posted in 2012.

=== Collectible Card Game ===
On August 8, 2005, Krahulik announced that Penny Arcade, in partnership with Sabertooth Games, would be producing a collectible card game based on the Penny Arcade franchise. The resulting Penny Arcade "battle box" was released in February 2006 as part of the Universal Fighting System.

There are also a few spinoffs from the main comic that have gained independent existences. An example is Epic Legends Of The Hierarchs: The Elemenstor Saga (ELotH:TES), a parody of the written-by-committee fantasy fiction used as back-story for a wide variety of games: originally a one-off gag in the Penny Arcade comic, in late 2005 this was expanded into a complete fantasy universe, documented on a hoax "fan-wiki". ELotH:TES first appeared in the webcomic of February 7, 2005, and has subsequently been featured in the comics of November 7, 2005 and November 30, 2005. Several elements of the ELotH:TES universe are featured on the cover of their second comics collection, Epic Legends of the Magic Sword Kings.

=== ESRB ad campaigns ===
On May 31, 2006, Krahulik announced a new advertising campaign for the Entertainment Software Rating Board. According to Krahulik, the ESRB "wanted a campaign that would communicate to gamers why the ESRB is important even if they don't think it directly affects them." Among the reasons he listed for Penny Arcade's accepting the job was that he and Holkins are both fathers and are concerned about the games their children might play. The ad campaign was rolled out in the summer and fall of 2006 and a second campaign was released in 2012 featuring a mother, a father and a gamer describing the tools employed by the ESRB.

=== Acquisitions Incorporated ===
In 2008, the creators of Penny Arcade partnered with Wizards of the Coast to create a podcast of a few 4th Edition Dungeons & Dragons adventures which led to the creation of the Acquisitions Incorporated. After the podcast was well-received, the players began livestreaming games starting in 2010 at the PAX festival. In 2012, Acquisitions Incorporated switched to 5th Edition Dungeons & Dragons as their game system with the Forgotten Realms as their new campaign setting. Academic Emily Friedman commented that many incorrectly attribute Acquisitions Incorporated as the start of the actual play genre. Acquisitions Incorporated went on to be described by Inverse in 2019 as the "longest-running live play game".

Friedman, writing for Polygon, noted that "these shows became more elaborate over time, moving from two cameras in a hotel ballroom to a livestreamed multi-camera setup with costumed players at PAX Prime in 2012". Prerecorded, edited actual play series, such as AI: The Series (2016–2017) and The "C" Team (2017–2021), were also released. In 2019, this work led to the official Acquisitions Incorporated sourcebook featuring the series' concept and characters. In 2023, the series switched to Greyhawk as their campaign setting. At PAX Unplugged 2025, Acquisitions Incorporated Daggerheart was announced. The series will be rebooted with a new campaign and setting and will use Daggerheart instead of Dungeons & Dragons as its tabletop role-playing game. Francesco Cacciatore of Polygon commented that while there have been many changes to Acquisitions Incorporated since its launch in 2008, including "only Penny Arcade duo Jerry Holkins and Mike Krahulik remaining from the original cast, the brand never lost its identity or its connection to its fanbase. Rather than using the switch to Daggerheart to start from scratch, they went to great lengths to ensure that this fit into the continuity of the show".

=== The New Kid film script ===
Announced on June 2, 2011, Paramount Pictures and Paramount Animation had acquired the rights to produce an animated film adaptation of the one-off strip The New Kid, which was published on October 29, 2010. The strip was one of three mini-strips which featured a cinematic opening to a larger story left unexplored. The New Kid is about a boy who is moving to a new planet with his family because of his father's career. The script was written by Gary Whitta and would have been produced by Mary Parent and Cale Boyter.

At PAX Australia in 2016, during a Q&A session, Holkins revealed that changes at Paramount resulted in the film rights being returned to Penny Arcade and the project canceled. He did note, however, that Whitta's script was complete and the project could move forward with another production company in the future.

=== The Trenches ===
The Trenches was a 2011-2015 comic series by Krahulik and Holkins in collaboration with webcomic PvP's creator Scott Kurtz. The comic followed a man named Issac and his life as a game tester. The series was launched on August 9, 2011, and featured new strips every Tuesday and Thursday, usually accompanied by a "Tale from the Trenches", which was a short piece submitted by a reader detailing their own experiences in the game industry.

In September 2012, Kurtz stopped illustrating the webcomic, due to lack of time, and was replaced by Mary Cagle, a former intern of his, and the creator of the webcomic Kiwi Blitz. Kurtz still continued to collaborate with Krahulik and Holkins in writing the comic. In late August 2013, illustration was taken over by Ty Halley (Secret Life of a Journal Writer) and Monica Ray (Phuzzy Comics), former contestants of the Penny Arcade series Strip Search.

The Trenches was ultimately abandoned. The last comic was posted January 5, 2016, while the last Tales is from September 10, 2015.

=== The Decideotron ===
In 2011, Krahulik and Holkins released an application for iOS devices called The Decide-o-tron, presented by Eedar and developed by The Binary Mill. The app worked as a recommendation engine for video games; users would input games they'd enjoyed and the app attempted to predict their ratings of titles they had not yet played. Holkins described it as "Pandora for games". By 2014, the decideotron.com website was dead.

=== Kickstarter ===
In 2012, Penny Arcade created two Kickstarter projects. The first, in July 2012, was the Penny Arcade's Paint the Line card game which was used as an alternative to pre-ordering it and came with an exclusive comic. 259 backers pledged $9,025 to this project. The second, running from July to August 2012, was entitled Penny Arcade Sells Out and was intended to replace advertising revenue with crowd funding. The leaderboard ad on the home page of Penny Arcade would be removed if the minimum goal of $250,000 were reached, whereas the entire site would become completely ad-free for a year at $999,999. 9,069 backers pledged $528,144 to the project. The reality web series described as "our version of America's Next Top Webcomic" titled Strip Search arose from the $450,000 stretch goal.

=== I Come in Peace, With Console Advice ===
Krahulik and Holkins created a comic strip which compares the 7th generation consoles that appears in the December 2006 issue of Wired magazine.

== Penny Arcade events ==
Every Christmas since 2003, Penny Arcade hosts a charity called Child's Play to buy new toys for children's hospitals. As of 2025, Child's Play had processed over $67 million in donations since its inception. They have also sponsored a three-day gaming festival called the Penny Arcade Expo, later renamed to PAX, every August since 2004.

== Legal issues and controversy ==
=== Strawberry Shortcake ===
Krahulik and Holkins received a cease-and-desist letter from American Greetings Corporation over the use of American Greetings' Strawberry Shortcake and Plum Puddin' characters in the April 14, 2003 Penny Arcade strip entitled "Tart as a Double Entendre".

The duo chose not to enter into a legal battle over whether or not the strip was a protected form of parody, and they complied with the cease-and-desist by replacing it with an image directing their audience to send a letter to a lawyer for American Greetings. They later lampooned the incident by portraying an American Greetings employee as a Nazi.

=== Jack Thompson ===
On October 17, 2005, Krahulik and Holkins donated US$10,000 to the Entertainment Software Association foundation in the name of Jack Thompson, a disbarred attorney and activist against violence in video games. Earlier, Thompson himself had promised to donate $10,000 if a video game was created in which the player kills video game developers (A Modest Video Game Proposal), but after a mod to the game Grand Theft Auto was pointed out to already exist, Thompson called his challenge satire (referring to the title of the letter as a reference to "A Modest Proposal") and refused to donate the money. He claimed these games were not going to be manufactured, distributed, or sold like retail games, as his Modest Proposal stated, and therefore, the deal went unfulfilled. His refusal was met with disdain, given that multiple games were created or in the process of being created under Thompson's criteria. Krahulik and Holkins donated the money in his place, with a check containing the memo: "For Jack Thompson, Because Jack Thompson Won't".

Thompson proceeded to phone Krahulik, as related by Holkins in the corresponding news post.

On October 18, 2005, it was reported that Jack Thompson had faxed a letter to Seattle Police Chief Gil Kerlikowske claiming that Penny Arcade "employs certain personnel who have decided to commence and orchestrate criminal harassment of me by various means". Holkins defended the site by saying that the "harassment" Thompson referred to was simply "the natural result of a public figure making statements that people disagree with, and letting him know their thoughts on the matter via his publicly available contact information".

On October 21, 2005, Thompson claimed to have sent a letter to John McKay, U.S. Attorney for the Western District of Washington, in an attempt to get the FBI involved. Thompson re-iterated his claims of "extortion" and accused Penny Arcade of using "their Internet site and various other means to encourage and solicit criminal harassment". Penny Arcade denied the charge of "extortion", noting that they paid the $10,000 to charity, and asked nothing in return.

Thompson claimed the harassment of him is a direct result of Mike Krahulik's posts, which listed links to the Florida Bar Association. Thompson accused Penny Arcade of soliciting complaints to the Bar against him, even though Krahulik actually posted the opposite, asking fans to cease sending letters to the Bar, as the Bar acknowledged that it is aware of Thompson's actions, thanks to previous letters.

The Seattle PD eventually acknowledged receiving a complaint from Thompson, but have commented that they believe the issue to be a civil, rather than criminal, matter. They noted that this was from initial impressions of the letter they received, and their criminal investigations bureau is reviewing the letter to make sure that there were not any criminal matters that they missed.

On the same day, Scott Kurtz, creator of the webcomic PvP (webcomic) and a longtime friend of Krahulik and Holkins, used the image of the letter Thompson sent to the Seattle PD to create a parody letter in which Jack attempts to enlist the aid of the Justice League of America by claiming Gabe and Tycho to be villains of some description.

The Penny Arcade shop had at the time sold an "I hate Jack Thompson" T-shirt, claiming that every living creature, including Thompson's own mother, hates Jack Thompson.

On March 21, 2007, Thompson filed a countersuit to the lawsuit brought against him by Take Two Interactive claiming that they are at the center of a RICO conspiracy. Penny Arcade was named as one of the co-conspirators. At Sakura-Con 2007, Krahulik announced that the suit had been dropped.

=== Dickwolves controversy ===
In an August 11, 2010 comic entitled "The Sixth Slave", an NPC pleads with a player who then refuses to save him: "Every morning, we are roused by savage blows. Every night, we are raped to sleep by the dickwolves". The strip drew criticism from many commentators, including from The American Prospect and The Boston Phoenix. Krahulik and Holkins dismissed these criticisms, later selling "Team Dickwolves" T-shirts based on the strip. They later removed the "Team Dickwolves" shirt from their store due to complaints that it made potential PAX attendees uncomfortable. After the removal, Krahulik posted online that removing the shirts was only partly caving to pressure but mainly due to people who had personally emailed him and were reasonable with their concerns. Krahulik also stated that anyone still hesitant about going to PAX even after removal of the shirts should not come to PAX. In September 2013, on the last day of PAX, Krahulik told a panel that he thought that "pulling the dickwolves merchandise was a mistake", to cheers from the crowd. However, Krahulik later apologized on the Penny Arcade website, stating that he regretted contributing to the furor that had followed the original comic. Both critics of the comic strip and Krahulik and Holkins, made claims of receiving verbal abuse through social media and death threats.

== "Greater Internet Fuckwad Theory" ==
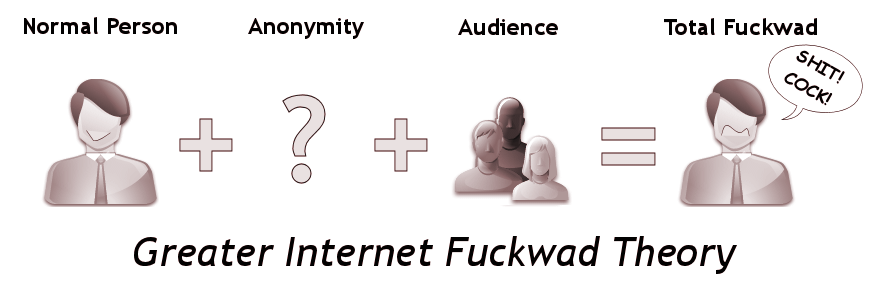
Greater Internet Fuckwad Theory

"John Gabriel's Greater Internet Fuckwad Theory" was posted in the Penny Arcade strip published March 19, 2004. It regards the online disinhibition effect, in which Internet users exhibit unsociable tendencies while interacting with other Internet users. Krahulik and Holkins suggest that, given both anonymity and an audience, an otherwise regular person becomes aggressively antisocial. In 2013, Holkins gave the corollary that "Normal Person - Consequences + Audience = Total Fuckwad".

Clay Shirky, an adjunct professor at New York University who studies social and economic effects of Internet technologies, explains: "There's a large crowd and you can act out in front of it without paying any personal price to your reputation,” which "creates conditions most likely to draw out the typical Internet user's worst impulses." In an Advocate article about online homophobia, this theory was used to account for behavior on online forums where one can remain anonymous in front of an audience: for instance, posting comments on popular YouTube videos.

== Collected editions ==
- Year One: A Penny Arcade Retrospective (Limited Edition) — ISBN 1-931195-07-2
- Year One: A Penny Arcade Retrospective (Soft Cover) — ISBN 1-931195-11-0
- Year One: A Penny Arcade Retrospective (Hard Cover) — ISBN 1-931195-12-9
- Penny Arcade, Volume 1: Attack of the Bacon Robots — ISBN 1-59307-444-1
- Penny Arcade Limited Edition Signed – Attack Of The Bacon Robots — ISBN 1-59307-650-9
- Penny Arcade, Volume 2: Epic Legends Of The Magic Sword Kings — ISBN 1-59307-541-3
- Penny Arcade, Volume 3: The Warsun Prophecies — ISBN 1-59307-635-5
- Penny Arcade, Volume 4: Birds Are Weird — ISBN 1-59307-773-4
- Penny Arcade, Volume 5: The Case of the Mummy's Gold — ISBN 1-59307-814-5
- Penny Arcade, Volume 6: The Halls Below (Limited Edition) - ISBN 978-0-307-29185-1
- Penny Arcade, Volume 6: The Halls Below (Soft Cover) — ISBN 0-345-51227-8
- Penny Arcade, Volume 7: Be Good, Little Puppy — ISBN 978-0-345-51228-4
- Penny Arcade, Volume 8: Magical Kids in Danger — ISBN 978-1-620-10006-6
- Penny Arcade, Volume 9: Passion's Howl — ISBN 978-1-620-10007-3
- The Splendid Magic of Penny Arcade: The 11.5 Anniversary Edition (Hardcover) — ISBN 978-0-345-51226-0
- Penny Arcade, Volume 10: The Fall of Penny Arcade — ISBN 978-0-997-16190-8

== Reception ==
On December 13, 2006, Next Generation Magazine rated Krahulik and Holkins among its "Top 25 People of the Year". Also appearing on the list were Nintendo of America President Reggie Fils-Aimé and former Xbox corporate vice-president Peter Moore. Krahulik made a post about the honor, in which he explained that Penny Arcade was created only because Next Gen rejected the duo's entry to a comic contest many years before. Entertainment Weekly listed Penny Arcade on their "100 Sites to Bookmark Now," calling it "a hilarious and smart webcomic for gamers." MTV Online named Holkins and Krahulik two of the world's most influential gamers, saying "they have become the closest the medium has to leaders of a gamers' movement." Time.com named Penny Arcade as one of its "50 Best Websites" for 2008 "...for the way it pokes fun at the high-tech industry and the people who love it." 1UP.com described it as "the One True Gaming Webcomic." Penny Arcade was used along with American Elf, Fetus-X, and Questionable Content as an example of comics using the web to create "an explosion of diverse genres and styles" in Scott McCloud's 2006 book Making Comics.

== Awards and recognition ==
On March 5, 2009, the Washington State Senate honored Holkins and Krahulik, both originally from Spokane, for the contribution that they had made to the state, the video game industry, and to children's charities from around the world courtesy of their Child's Play initiative. Later in March, Penny Arcade won the category "Best Webcomic" in the fan voted Project Fanboy Awards for 2008.

In 2010, Holkins, Krahulik, and Khoo were awarded the annual "Ambassador Award" at GDC's Game Developers Choice Awards for contributions they had made to the industry. The same year, Time included Holkins and Krahulik in the annual "Time 100", the magazine's listing of the world's 100 most influential people.

In July 2015, Holkins and Krahulik were recognized as "Multimedia Empire Builders" in Ad Week's 10 Visual Artists Changing the Way We See Advertising issue.

== See also ==
- List of comic strips
- List of professional webcomic artists
- List of web comics
