= Narbonic =

Webcomic by Shaenon K. Garrity

- Narbonic Vol. 1
- Author: Shaenon K. Garrity
- Website: https://www.narbonic.com/
- Current status/schedule: Finished
- Launch date: 2000-07-31
- End date: 2006-12-31
- Genre(s): Comedy, Science fiction

Narbonic is a webcomic written and drawn by Shaenon K. Garrity. The storylines center on the misadventures of the staff of the fictional Narbonic Labs, which is the domain of mad scientist Helen Narbon. The strip started on July 31, 2000, and finished on December 31, 2006. On January 1, 2007, Garrity launched the "Director's Cut", an "annotated replay" of Narbonic. Narbonic was part of the subscription-based Modern Tales website for several years but moved to Webcomics Nation in July 2006, where it resumed being free-to-read. The comic is also a member of The Nice comics collective.

== About the strip ==
Narbonic is drawn entirely by hand and presented in the style of the traditional American four-panel newspaper strip. It centers upon the adventures of computer programmer Dave Davenport, superintelligent gerbil RT-5478 (or "Artie"), evil intern Mell W. Kelly, and mad geneticist Helen Beta Narbon. While the strip is essentially an ensemble piece, with storylines focusing on major and minor characters alike, Dave occupies the role of protagonist more often than any other character.

As one of the few characters with a semblance of normality, the blandly cynical Dave Davenport has traditionally provided a convenient source of identification and emotional connection for the audience. In this strip's world, however, such a person is a natural target for misfortune. As a result, Dave suffers more calamity than any of the other characters, having been killed, sent to Hell, shot to the Moon, transported helplessly through time, sent on a road trip with dozens of identical android fugitives, and experimented upon without his consent (repeatedly).

The strip uses the Mad Scientist trope as its premise, hearkening back to Sappo by Elzie Segar and the inventions of Rube Goldberg in theme. "Mad scientist" is a job description, and henchmen are unionized. The insane, pseudoscientific inventions and experiments of Helen Narbon and her nemesis and romantic crush, Professor Lupin Madblood, become the springboards for plotlines as the Narbonics Labs staff tries to deal with their consequences. These range from a revolution fomented by insane gerbils to Helen's mother murdering Dave with one of Helen's own death rays to a battle with the legions of Hell during a sleepover.

=== Allusions ===
Narbonic contains many allusions to an eclectic array of literary and film works, ranging from cult movie classics to Victorian Era science fiction. The reference may be as short as a single strip, or the basis for an entire story-arc, but recognition is never a prerequisite for understanding the strip.

Narbonic makes few references to other webcomics, even though this is a fairly common activity within the community. For example, in the story arc "The End", Helen starts making up excuses to leave Dave. The four she gave were that her father killed himself in front of her, her college fiancé tried to rape her, she had Alzheimer's disease, and she suffered "a tragic miscarriage"; references to, respectively, Faye in Questionable Content, Ki in General Protection Fault, Davan's father in Something Positive and Lilah in Ctrl+Alt+Del. Two of the rare occasions on which other webcomics make an appearance are as follows. First, at the end of the initial story arc, a news report implies that most of Helen's escaped giant ur-gerbils were slaughtered by Bun-Bun of Sluggy Freelance (with news reaction by Melonpool's Sammy the Hammy). Second, at the end of the Doppelganger Gambit arc, Garrity draws, in the background of a bar scene, the cast of the webcomic 1/0 in the human forms they received at that strip's end.

== Major characters ==
=== Helen B. Narbon, a.k.a. "Beta" ===
The mad scientist who runs Narbonic Labs, Helen is cheerful, optimistic, and, definitionally, quite insane. Her favorite attire is a labcoat worn over jean shorts and a T-shirt reading "evil", with the "i" dotted by a pink heart. Though Helen's gerbil fixation is prominently featured in the strip, her well-justified fear that she will someday become identical to her mother, of whom she is a clone, may more deeply motivate her actions. It is, perhaps, this fear that feeds her second major scientific fascination: the biological underpinnings of mad genius.

Eventually, it is revealed that Helen has embarked on an ambitious research project to study just this question. Published under a pseudonym and known to the general mad science community only as the Tinasky Study (a probable allusion to Wanda Tinasky), Helen's project is a detailed, covert study of a "pre-mad" mad genius, who happens to be none other than her faithful technician, Dave Davenport.

=== Mell Kelly ===
Helen's evil intern Melody Wildflower Kelly has long, dark hair and glasses, and usually wears an off-the-shoulder top, a skirt, and tights. While she begins her employment with few evil skills, save a flair for treachery and a rather terrifying passion for weaponry, she eventually learns the value of foresight and planning. By shifting her focus to the subtler fields of evil, such as law and politics, she soon grows into an effective villainess in her own right. Despite a generally upbeat personality, Mell is actually an extremely dangerous person, and she is shown to have only one shoulder angel (whereas Helen and Dave each have several). All it does is quietly chant "Kill... kill... kill..." in her ear.

=== Dave Davenport ===
Helen's computer technician, who is recruited directly from Vassar College's graduation ceremony to fix a malfunctioning doomsday machine. Bespectacled, beflanneled, and bearded, and 6'1" when he isn't slouching, Dave Davenport is an unrepentant geek who generally expects the worst. Working at Narbonic Labs does little to correct this pessimism.

For much of the strip's run, Dave is a chain-smoker, but his attempts to change his past, present and future when one of Helen's experiments make him "come unstuck in time" result in his never having begun to smoke. This excursion to the past also offers Dave an opportunity to grapple with his own shortcomings, and thus gain the confidence he needs to approach Helen romantically. The romantic tension between Helen and Dave, and the conflict that results from Helen's attempts to experiment upon him unawares, provide a continuous story arc over most of the strip's run.

Dave is eventually revealed to be a latent mad genius. Helen in fact suspected this during their first meeting when he fixed her doomsday device within minutes. She became sure of his potential when he successfully "repaired" a broken "death ray" that was in fact the console from a rusted mail-sorting machine. She then spent the next several years studying the development of his abilities by subjecting him to various experiments and continuous on-the-job testing (giving him plenty of junk to repair and telling him it's broken super-science gear). The final two story arcs revolve around the consequences of his mind finally snapping.

=== Artie, a.k.a. RT-5478 ===
A superintelligent gerbil, created by Helen to do her taxes (although the author says that is merely an excuse and the real reason is that it would be cute), with the I.Q. of 1.17 Stephen Hawkings. Artie tends to be the outsider of the group, whether by virtue of being the lone voice of sanity among a crew of obsessives, the lone good soul among a crew of the wicked, or just the lone gerbil among a crew of humans. An ordained Unitarian Universalist minister and a Green Party member, Artie is a vocal proponent of nonviolence. An episode in which Helen transmogrifies him into human form destabilized his phenotype, and as a result, he now shifts between his original gerbil form and the form of a very tall, attractive, young gay black man with the voice of Ted Koppel. He has a (presumably unrequited) crush on forensic linguist Antonio Smith (see below).

== Hidden Story: Octavius Winter ==
Octavius Winter was the Narbon family's Evil Attorney during Helen Beta's college years. The storyline in which he appears is told within the filenames of the image files Monday through Saturday. The filenames consist of the date (in mmddyy format) and a few words of the story. Garrity's practice of adding additional words at the end of daily strips begins with the strip for August 17, 2002, near the end of the "Dave Vs. Dave" storyline; the story itself begins with the November 12th strip, during "Class Reunion."

== The Astonishing Excursions of Helen Narbon & Co. ==
A long-running secondary storyline exists, featuring the Victorian Helen Narbon and her friends (and enemies) engaged in various steampunk exploits. Shaenon (who here identifies herself as "S. K. Garrity") credits influence from "the kind suggestions of Mr. Mark Schumann." It is drawn in rotation with the regular strip and the various other Narbonic creations (listed farther down).

Unlike the regular strip, Excursions is presented in brownscale sepia to add to the antique flavor. It is probable that the cast of this storyline are all the progenitors of the regular strip's cast: while dead, Dave meets the ghosts of an earlier Helen and Mell, who are physically identical (except for their ghost tails) to, and dress the same as, the cast of Excursions. Another suggestion that it is the forerunner of Narbonic is that in one episode, Helen finds "the old family artificial gravity formula" - something that does indeed appear in Excursions.

Garrity had planned on doing another storyline with Silver Age superhero versions of the characters (note the superhero costumes among the paper-doll outfits), but Excursions ended up lasting until the end of Narbonic's run.

== Outside the plot line ==
Narbonic's Sundays are dedicated to features other than whatever the characters are up to in the present plot arc. Other features (some regular, others sporadic) make up a large component of Narbonic history and some even have direct bearing on the storyline. These include:

- Reader art
- Mailbag
- Contests
  - Haiku
  - Create a caption for a cartoon
  - Narbonic T-shirt
  - Give Dave a last name
  - Give MIT student Dave Barker (an enemy of the strip) a new title (following graduation)
- The Narbonic Coloring Book, featuring
  - Connect the dots (of Mell's gun)
  - Paint by numbers (Helen and some living pink goo)
  - Draw lines between two lists of animals (the second list is entirely "GERBIL")
  - Crossword
- Fan fiction
- Down with the artist - a series of protests by the characters against the management of Shaenon.

== Reception ==
Shaenon Garrity was nominated for "Best New Talent" in the 2001 Friends of Lulu awards. In 2005 she won their "Lulu of the Year." Garrity also won the 2005 Web Cartoonist Choice Award for "Outstanding Writer." Scott McCloud listed her as one of his 20 favorite web cartoonists in July 2004, saying, "Garrity is emerging as one of our best online humor writers."

== Li'l Mell and Sergio ==
Li'l Mell and Sergio is a prequel of sorts to Narbonic, featuring the grade school exploits of a hyperactive and violent young girl named Melody Kelly, or "Mell", and her friend and classmate Sergio, a brilliant young boy with low self-esteem. It is published on the anthology site Girlamatic, and written by Garrity and drawn by a succession of artists, including Vera Brosgol, Bill Mudron, Andrew Farago, Neil Babra and Garrity herself. There is no evidence or mention of Sergio in Narbonic continuity, despite previous comics of her mentioned, including the comic that Dave and Mel both first appeared in. (Helen's comic is also linked on her site.) However, Artie makes a cameo in human form. https://web.archive.org/web/20091205035512/http://girlamatic.com/mell/2000/01/01/page-seven/ This is explained further in Narbonic: Volume Six's bonus story.

Sergio did later appear in Garrity's subsequent comic, Skin Horse, which is set in the same mad science world as Narbonic.

== External links and other information ==
- Complete series
- Rerun of series
- Rerun series with commentary from Shaenon Garrity and fen
- Former Narbonic web site at Modern Tales
