= Skin Horse =

Webcomic

- Skin Horse, Volume 1
- Author(s): Shaenon K. Garrity, Jeffrey Channing Wells
- Website: http://www.skin-horse.com
- Current status/schedule: Finished
- Launch date: 2007-12-31
- End date: 2022-06-26
- Genre(s): Comedy, science fiction

Skin Horse was a webcomic written by Shaenon K. Garrity and Jeffrey Channing Wells, and drawn by Garrity. The storylines centered around the misadventures of the staff of a little-known government agency working on "Project Skin Horse". The strip started on December 31, 2007 and ended on June 26, 2022, and was updated every day of the week (although the Sunday updates consisted of fan art, sketches, and background). Skin Horse was part of the now-defunct webcomic hosting platform Webcomics Nation, where it was free to read. It is also syndicated on GoComics, where the past month's updates are free to read, with further archives available to subscribers.

== About ==
"Project Skin Horse” was a secret Federal government agency, a non-human advocacy bureau responsible for rescuing and resettling non-human sapient beings created by mad scientists. For example, in the "Cowardly Lion" story arc, a lion augmented with human intelligence was roaming loose in a zoo. Skin Horse field operatives subdued, transported, and resettled the lion in a sanctuary for sapient large cats. The rescued sapient beings were referred to as "clients". With the exception of the character Tip, the employees of the agency were themselves rescued former clients. An informal name for the organization was "Black Ops Social Services". They tended to cross paths with a rival black ops military research organization known as "Anasigma".

Unlike Garrity's earlier comic, Narbonic, mad scientists did not play a central role. Rather, their monstrous creations did.

Although the strip was conceived by and was drawn by Garrity, she and Wells co-wrote and brainstormed ideas together, with some scripts written by Garrity and others by Wells.

The title was taken from a character name in the 1922 children's book The Velveteen Rabbit, where one passage reads: "'Real isn't how you are made,' said the Skin Horse, 'It's a thing that happens to you ... Then you become Real.'"

== Cast ==
=== Tip ===
Dr. Dennis "Tip" Wilkin, a relatively new field operative and the only fully human employee of Project Skin Horse, was a decorated former captain of the U.S. Army, a trained psychologist, a passionate cross-dresser and an almost supernatural seducer. Tip was essentially a research psychologist, but in an emergency he could wield therapy puppets.

=== Sweetheart ===
Captain's Fancy Valentine Sweetheart was a genetically modified sapient dog, created by a mad scientist. She came to work for Project Skin Horse as a field operative. She was generally the most clear-thinking and rational team member, but periodically exhibited feelings of insecurity.

=== Unity ===
Unity was a "necrotic" being: dead tissue animated through a secret military process. A field operative for Project Skin Horse, she was Sweetheart's best friend. Unity was developed to be a bio-weapon, but proved to be too hard to control and was therefore moved to Project Skin Horse. Unity was good-natured, liked guns, and was inclined to use gratuitously unnecessary violence. Her safety phrase, "Blueberry waffles", to suspend her aggression patterns, was only revealed by Anasigma after Project Skin Horse had spent a fortune on obedience classes.

Unity as a creature was actually a nanotechnology ooze that controlled the body it inhabited, as seen in the "Once and Future" story arc. As such, she could be transferred (with help) into another body or creature, although living bodies would reject her after a time, usually by vomiting her out. Her “normal” body was an amalgam of various human corpses of varying ethnicities, and several times throughout the series, she was seen to add, remove, or adapt to new body parts.

Unity was also seen to gain intelligence proportional to the amount of brains she consumed, although social graces were not included with this increase. During the story arc "Railway Children," she consumeed a vast quantity of artificially produced brains, and with it gained superhuman intelligence levels. She repeated this during the events of "My brother Sam is Dead," only to use her insight to make comments about her teammates' behavior that left them distrusting of her in this heightened state.

=== Gavotte ===
The administrative leader of Project Skin Horse, Gavotte was a collective being consisting of a swarm of bees that thought with a single female mind. Most of the other agency employees were nervous around her—Tip in particular since he was fatally allergic to bee stings.

=== Moustachio the Thinkonium ===
A 19th century wind-up automaton of destruction with a clockwork brain, Moustachio was the receptionist at Project Skin Horse. He had a limited long-term memory and needed wax cylinders from cold storage to remember his earlier days. His legs were removed by the British government as a safety precaution. He thought and spoke like a 19th-century gentleman and had little regard for or knowledge of new technology.

=== Nick Zerhakker ===
A young adult, introduced in the "I Can Fly" story arc, video game obsessive Nick was unknowingly co-opted into "Project Whirligig". The black military program intended to weaponize him by secretly installing him in a virtual reality, then removing his brain and implanting it in a black V-22 Osprey–a military tiltrotor aircraft–and finally subconsciously training Nick to control the Osprey as if it were his own body. In spite of Nick's love of shooting virtual bad guys, he abhored the thought of killing real people, and so he joined the Skin Horse team.

=== Minor characters ===
Konstantin
Russian black ops agent who joined the American police force after "very accidental and surprising death of Yeltsin." He was introduced in the "Cowardly Lion" story arc and later became an Annex One security guard.
Dr. Virginia Lee
Introduced in the "I Can Fly" story arc as a mad scientist wannabe and member of a secret organization known only as "Anasigma". She was involved in the creation of both U.N.I.T.Y. and "Project Whirligig". Dr. Lee was specifically hired by Anasigma to reverse engineer Mad Scientist technology into "sane" technology, which she could do with moderate success. Unity was her first successful project, but others included the Brain-O-Mat that produced brain matter to feed zombies, and prevented them from feeding on living humans.

Dr. Lee had an ongoing romantic interest with Nick, but neither party was willing to discuss or admit to this for years — even to themselves.
Captain Bram
A Canadian mad scientist who created Sweetheart and her pack mates and developed a virus to afflict humans with lycanthropy. When his application to the American Kennel Club to recognize the "Genetically-Engineered Super Battle Dog" as a recognizable breed was denied, he vowed to force the organization to change its position by conquering the United States using said dogs. Bram died before accomplishing his goal, however, and his corpse was reluctantly eaten by his creations.
Chris and Marcie
Two nerdy scientists working for the Department of Irradiation in Annex One, Chris and Marcie were often found gaming with (and within) Nick. Tip and Marcie briefly dated until she dumped him for Chris in the "Tin Soldier" story arc.
Dr. Berenice "Tigerlily" Jones
Blaxploitation-themed mad scientist brought in on a work release program to repair Moustachio during the "Brave Little Toasters" story arc.
Gold Bug
The mysterious benefactor of Project Skin Horse, who was known to Gavotte.

== Reception ==
Io9 praised Garrity and Wells for "piling absurdities onto absurdities without overcrowding their stories".

Comic Book Resources (reviewing the first collected volume) called it "delightful" and "laugh-out-loud funny, in the way that the Marx Brothers were funny", and lauded it for "deliver(ing) a gag every day and also build(ing) up a larger storyline", comparing the "easygoing" and "simple, cartoony" art to Walt Kelly, but faulted Garrity's "tendency to crowd the panels with text: "the dialogue really sparkles, but it also takes up a lot of space on the page."

== Awards ==
- Outstanding Small Press award at the 2008 Stumptown Comics Fest.
