= Shaenon K. Garrity =

American writer and critic

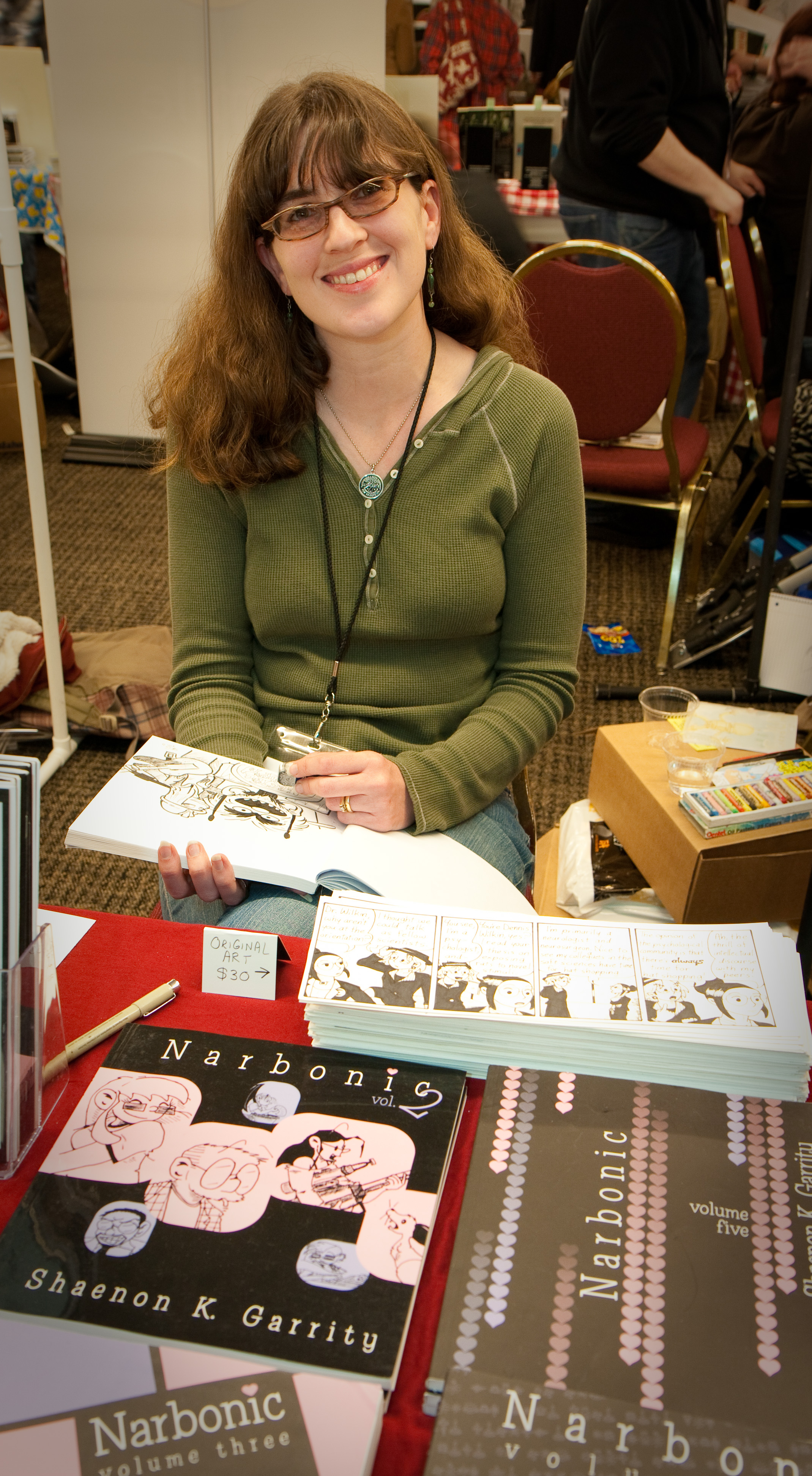
- Garrity in 2010
- Born: May 4, 1978 (age 48) Pittsburgh, Pennsylvania, U.S.
- Areas: Cartoonist, Writer, Editor
- Notable works: Narbonic, Skin Horse

Shaenon K. Garrity is an American webcomic creator and science-fiction author best known for her webcomics Narbonic and Skin Horse. She collaborated with various artists to write webcomics for the Modern Tales-family of webcomic subscription services in the early 2000s, and write columns for various comics journals. Since 2003, Garrity has done freelance editing for Viz Media on various manga translations.

== Early life ==
Garrity was born in Pittsburgh in 1978. She enjoyed drawing and writing at a young age, and she began drawing comics in high school. As a youth correspondent, Garrity drew a comic strip for the kids' section of the Cleveland Plain Dealer. She studied English at Vassar College, where she ran a comic strip in the college newspaper. Once out of college, Garrity worked as a front-desk secretary at Viz Media for three years while simultaneously creating Narbonic.

== Webcomics ==
Shaenon Garrity conceived her daily webcomic Narbonic in college, after watching the science-fiction films City of Lost Children and Mystery Science Theater 3000: The Movie back-to-back. She began posting her webcomic, about the evil mad scientist Helen Narbon and her minions, shortly after moving to San Francisco in July 2000. She initially advertised her webcomic to her family, friends, and her old Usenet group, and she submitted her website to major search engines. She also submitted Narbonic to the webcomic portal Keenspot, but it was rejected. Garrity had no plans to profit from her work, but she was curious how far her readership would grow. Narbonic's audience grew slowly during its first year, but shot up significantly in 2001, hitting Garrity with steep bandwidth charges.

Narbonic was part of the launch line-up of Joey Manley's webcomic subscription website Modern Tales in March 2002, and it remained the most popular feature on the website until she moved it to Webcomics Nation in 2006. In the following years, Garrity began several webcomics on Manley's subscription services. When the platform Girlamatic launched in 2003, Manley and Lea Hernandez suggested she do a Narbonic spin-off featuring a child version of the character Mell, one of Helen Narbon's minions. Garrity initially collaborated with artist Vera Brosgol to write the webcomic Li'l Mell for Girlamatic, and this webcomic later had a rotating roster of artists. For the platform Graphic Smash, Garrity collaborated with artists Robert Stevenson and Roger Langridge to write More Fun, and, for Serializer's 2002 launch, Garrity worked with Tom Hart to write TrunkTown. After the launch of Webcomics Nation, Garrity wrote Smithson, drawn by Brian Moore and Roger Langridge. Garrity became content editor for Modern Tales in 2006. She revived the long-form webcomic section of the website and worked on implementing Project Wonderful.

Garrity concluded Narbonic on December 31, 2006, and Garrity began a commentated "director's cut" of the webcomic online a few years later. During Narbonic's run, Garrity was contacted by Narbonic reader Jeffrey Wells, who was writing a story that shared some elements with Garrity's webcomic. In 2008, Garrity and Wells launched the daily webcomic Skin Horse. Telling the story of a top secret government agency that handles non-humans as armed social workers, Skin Horse was the most popular webcomic on Webcomics Nation until it was moved to its own website and GoComics. The first volumes of Skin Horse were published by a San Francisco Bay Area artist group, the Couscous Comics collective. Skin Horse concluded in 2022, and the last of its twelve print volumes was published.

In 2010, Garrity brought back Li'l Mell with a new storyline, this time collaborating with artist Cameron Nielson.

== Other work ==
Garrity began volunteering at the Cartoon Art Museum in 2000, and she continued to work there throughout her webcomic career. Shortly after being laid off by Viz Media in 2003, Garrity began doing freelance editing work for the company. She edited One Piece, YuYu Hakusho, Ultimate Muscle, Knights of the Zodiac, and Tenchi Muyo! for the English-language Shonen Jump magazine, and wrote reviews for the Animerica magazine. Garrity wrote for Marvel Comics in the mid-2000s, writing the 2005–2007 Marvel Holiday Specials. She was a regular contributor for Sequential Tart, The Comics Journal, Publishers Weekly, and Anime News Network.

Handling the localization of Case Closed, Garrity became responsible for official translations of the names of new characters. Garrity intended to write the book CLAMP in America in 2011, a volume which was intended to cover the history of the popular four-member manga creation team CLAMP. However, this release was cancelled due to copyright issues.

Garrity wrote short science-fiction stories in Strange Horizons, Lightspeed, and Machine of Death. In 2013, Garrity contributed to Dark Horse Comics' CBLDF Presents Manga: Introduction, Challenges, and Best Practices.

== Personal life ==
Garrity is married to artist and former Cartoon Art Museum curator Andrew Farago, and they moved to Berkeley, California in 2009. The two had a son in 2014.

== Awards ==
Garrity won the 2005 Friends of Lulu "Lulu of the Year" award, alongside Kazu Kibuishi. In 2005, Garrity's Narbonic won in the "Outstanding Writing" category of the Web Cartoonists' Choice Awards. During her spotlight panel at the 2022 Comic-Con International, Garrity received the Inkpot Award for Achievement in Comic Arts.
