= ComicSpace =

Social network and webcomic hosting service

- 2006-2010 logo
- Owners: Josh Roberts, Joey Manley
- Website: ComicSpace.com (archived)
- Launched: December 5, 2006
- Current status: Discontinued

ComicSpace was an online social network and webcomic hosting service created and managed by Josh Roberts and Joey Manley between 2006 and 2012. The website was inspired by MySpace and was intended as a place where writers, artists, publishers, and fans could interact and share their work. Though ComicSpace was highly successful upon launch, it never fully took off. Roberts and Manley expanded the scope of the project with the help of investment firm E-Line Ventures in 2007, and Manley began merging his existing websites into ComicSpace, starting with Webcomics Nation. By 2012, interest in ComicSpace had waned, and Roberts and Manley abandoned the project.

== Concept and early development ==
Josh Roberts had created and run the webcomic directory OnlineComics.net since 2001, and began restructuring its codebase in the early summer of 2006. Roberts had registered the domain name ComicSpace.com on a whim in 2005. In November 2006, shortly after being introduced to the social media website MySpace and longing for a break from the OnlineComics.net code, Roberts decided to build a comics-oriented version of MySpace to host on ComicSpace.com. ComicSpace launched within a month after being conceptualized, on December 5, 2006. Roberts sent out an email to the 4,600 webcomic creators who were registered on OnlineComics.net in order to give them a chance to register an account before making the website fully public. Because the actual webcomic hosting features were not in place yet, Roberts expected only a few hundred people to register. However, the website was an early hit, accumulating 3,500 members within the first week. Among these early users were cartoonists Warren Ellis, Dave Gibbons, Steve Rude, and Ed Brubaker.

Roberts' initial plans for the website included to make RSS a major feature, and to allow users to specify their connection to the field of comics, letting users browse writers, artists, publishers, and retailers as sub-groups. Advertising network Project Wonderful was incorporated into ComicSpace shortly after its launch in late 2006. The service auctioned 16 small advertisements at the top of the ComicSpace website, and Roberts expected to earn $1,000 USD per month after Project Wonderful took its cut.

When Joey Manley joined Roberts in 2007, he described ComicSpace as a user-generated content website, in order to contrast it with his own Modern Tales-family of curated subscription services. When asked what skills he and Roberts might bring to the table for ComicSpace, Manley noted that Roberts has experience with helping readers find and keep track of webcomics, while he had more experience with publishing and monetization himself.

== E-Line Media investment and mergers ==
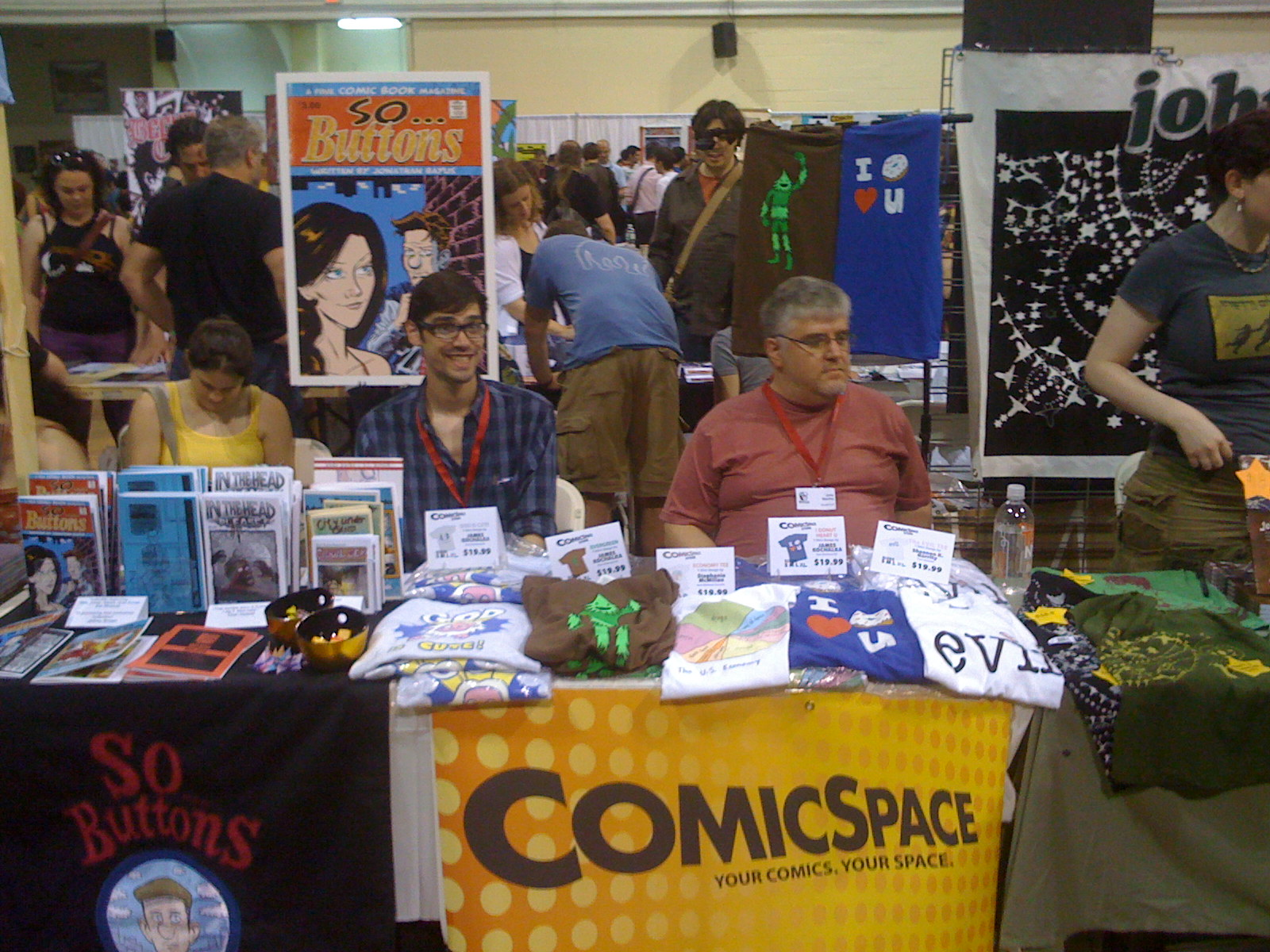
Roberts and Manley at a ComicSpace booth in 2009

In October 2007, Joey Manley announced that he had partnered with Roberts, and that they had received an infusion of capital from an investment firm. Between November 2007 and April 2008, Manley's free webcomic hosting service Webcomics Nation, Manley's blog TalkAboutComics, and Roberts' website OnlineComics.net were all combined into ComicSpace. The website was funded by E-Line Ventures, a newly formed investment firm created by Alan Gershenfeld and Michael Angst. E-Line Ventures self-described as "a 'double bottom line' early-stage venture fund focused on empowering individuals, small businesses and disenfranchised communities through innovative uses of personal fabrication, digital media and on-demand business services." Gershenfeld found Manley while looking for mobile phone comics content, and was interested in working together with him and Roberts to "empower" individual cartoonists. Roberts and Manley were the largest shareholders in the ComicSpace venture, each owning an equal portion of the company while E-Line was a minority investor. The two primarily decided to reach out for investment because they needed to hire significant programming, design, and business management talent to continue to innovate at the level they wanted to.

Todd Allen of Comic Book Resources said in 2007 that "ComicSpace is poised to become what I would call a vertical portal for the comics industry," as hosting, user-generated content, editorially-branded content, commentary, and social networking were all merged into a traditional comics-viewing portal. ComicSpace was to produce revenue for cartoonists through advertising, merchandising, and print publishing. ComicSpace's own earnings would be a function of the individual cartoonists' earnings. Manley stated himself that "the merchandising element will be the single most revolutionary part of it," though Gershenfeld told Comic Book Resources that their main interest was being a service provider and facilitator rather than a publisher.

ComicSpace was planned to relaunch in the second quarter 2008, but Manley wrote in January 2009 that the merger with Webcomics Nation was "one of the more technically difficult projects" they had undertaken, and that it was taking longer than he had hoped. In February 2009, a digital ComicSpace store went online, and the company had set up an online advertising network. Manley decided that he wanted to relaunch all of his subscription services under the ComicSpace banner. Manley's webcomic magazine Girlamatic, for instance, had gone quiet in the second half of the 2000s, but it was relaunched in July 2009 under a new business model and with an expanded line-up of artists. Manley's websites still functioned as online magazines, but the webcomics on these sites became freely accessible and the creators were supported by the ComicSpace ad system.

At one point, writer Heidi MacDonald briefly talked with Manley about potentially integrating her website The Beat into ComicSpace.

== Abandonment ==
Manley was very enthusiastic about the ComicSpace project, and moved closer to Roberts in order to work on the company. However, the platform never fully took off, and Manley moved back to his native Kentucky in 2012. Though Manley continued to work on ComicSpace, his focus shifted on his creative work, and ComicSpace eventually shut down alongside Manley's other websites.
