= Joey Manley =

Webcomic publisher

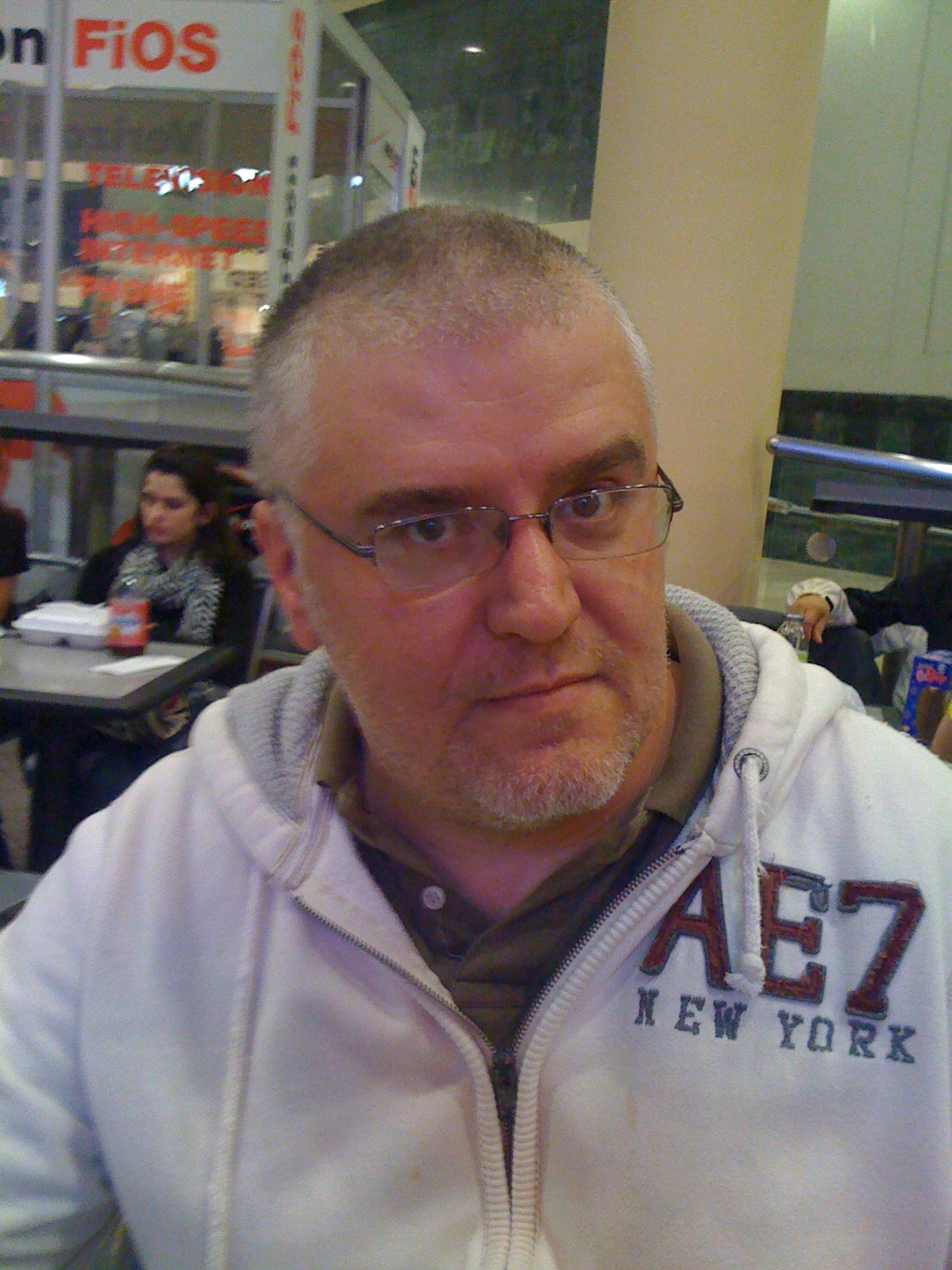
- Manley in 2009
- Born: Joseph Manley; July 1965 Russellville, Alabama, U.S.
- Died: November 7, 2013 (aged 48) Louisville, Kentucky, U.S.
- Areas: publisher; writer
- Notable works: Modern Tales; The Death of Donna-May Dean
- Spouse: Joe Botts

Joey Manley (July 1965 – November 7, 2013) was an American LGBT fiction author, web designer, and webcomics publisher. He was the founder and publisher of the Modern Tales family of webcomics websites, which included Modern Tales, Serializer, Girlamatic, Webcomics Nation, and others. Manley is considered one of the "founding pioneers" of the webcomic movement for creating a then-revolutionary subscription model.

== Early life and career ==
Joey Manley was born in Russellville, Alabama in 1965. Though he had drawn comics as a child, he never had an interest in becoming a cartoonist himself.

Manley's debut novel, The Death of Donna-May Dean, was published by St. Martin's Griffin in 1992. It tells the story about a young gay man coming of age in Alabama, and was quickly considered a cult classic of LGBT fiction.

Manley was 27 years old at the time of the novel's publication, and the pressure to follow his early success up with a second novel overwhelmed him. Instead, he began working in the then-new field of web design. In 2000, Manley moved to San Francisco, where he worked for streaming media and served as the first webmaster for Free Speech TV. The website he oversaw, freespeech.org, went on to win both a Webby Award and RealNetworks' Streamers Award.

== Work in webcomics ==
To learn more about webcomics and introduce himself to the American webcomic community, Manley began the podcast Digital Comics Talk and the review website Talk About Comics in 2001. Through his podcast, Manley came into contact with various major webcartoonists of the time. Manley soon began recruiting artists for a for-profit, subscription-based webcomics collective, which he launched in March 2002 as Modern Tales. At the time, Manley hoped the subscription model would increase the visibility of everyone involved in the project, even if each webcomic would have only drawn a niche interest individually. Though Modern Tales never managed to bring a living wage for the artists involved, it did do solid business and got attention from older comic book artists such as Harvey Pekar and Will Eisner. By 2005, Modern Tales had approximately 2,000 members, each paying $3 USD per month. Manley had moved to Louisville, Kentucky at this point in order to cut costs.

Manley started multiple subscription-based webcomic anthology sites in the early-2000s, such as Serializer (featuring high art avant garde webcomics, edited by Tom Hart), Girlamatic (featuring female-focused webcomics, edited by Lea Hernandez), and Graphic Smash (featuring action webcomics). Manley also published single-webcomic subscription sites like Hernandez' Rumble Girls and James Kochalka's American Elf. In 2003, Manley began co-hosting a podcast with Lea Hernandez titled The Diva Lea Show. Manley started Webcomics Nation in 2005, a webcomic hosting service. All his webcomic sites were together referred to as the "Modern Tales family" of websites, and they had featured artists such as Gene Luen Yang, Howard Cruse, Chris Onstad, Shaenon Garrity, and Dylan Meconis.

In collaboration with OnlineComics.net-creator Josh Roberts, Manley started developing a comics-oriented social media and publishing platform titled ComicSpace in 2007. ComicSpace received funding from Michael Angst and Alan Gershenfeld, who set up a new early-stage venture capital firm named E-Line Media. Webcomics Nation, Talk About Comics, and OnlineComics.net were all merged into ComicSpace. Manley told Comic Book Resources in 2007 that his editorial subscription services would remain largely unchanged, though that he was doing away with the subscription model as online advertisement and merchandising were becoming more viable. Despite this, the Modern Tales-family of websites went relatively quiet in the second half of the 2000s, and Manley began relaunching his subscription services within ComicSpace in 2009, starting with Girlamatic. Manley moved to New York City in order to work on the project and was known to be very enthusiastic about it, but ComicSpace never fully took off.

While still working on ComicSpace, Manley moved back to Louisville once again and began focusing on personal creative output through an online fiction workshop with a close circle of writers. In 2011, Manley began serializing a second novel online as a work-in-progress. Titled Snake-Boy Loves Sky Prince: a Gay Superhero Teen Romance, the book tells the story of a supervillain's minion falling in love with the son of a superhero. All of Manley's remaining webcomic services shut down in April 2013.

== Philosophy ==
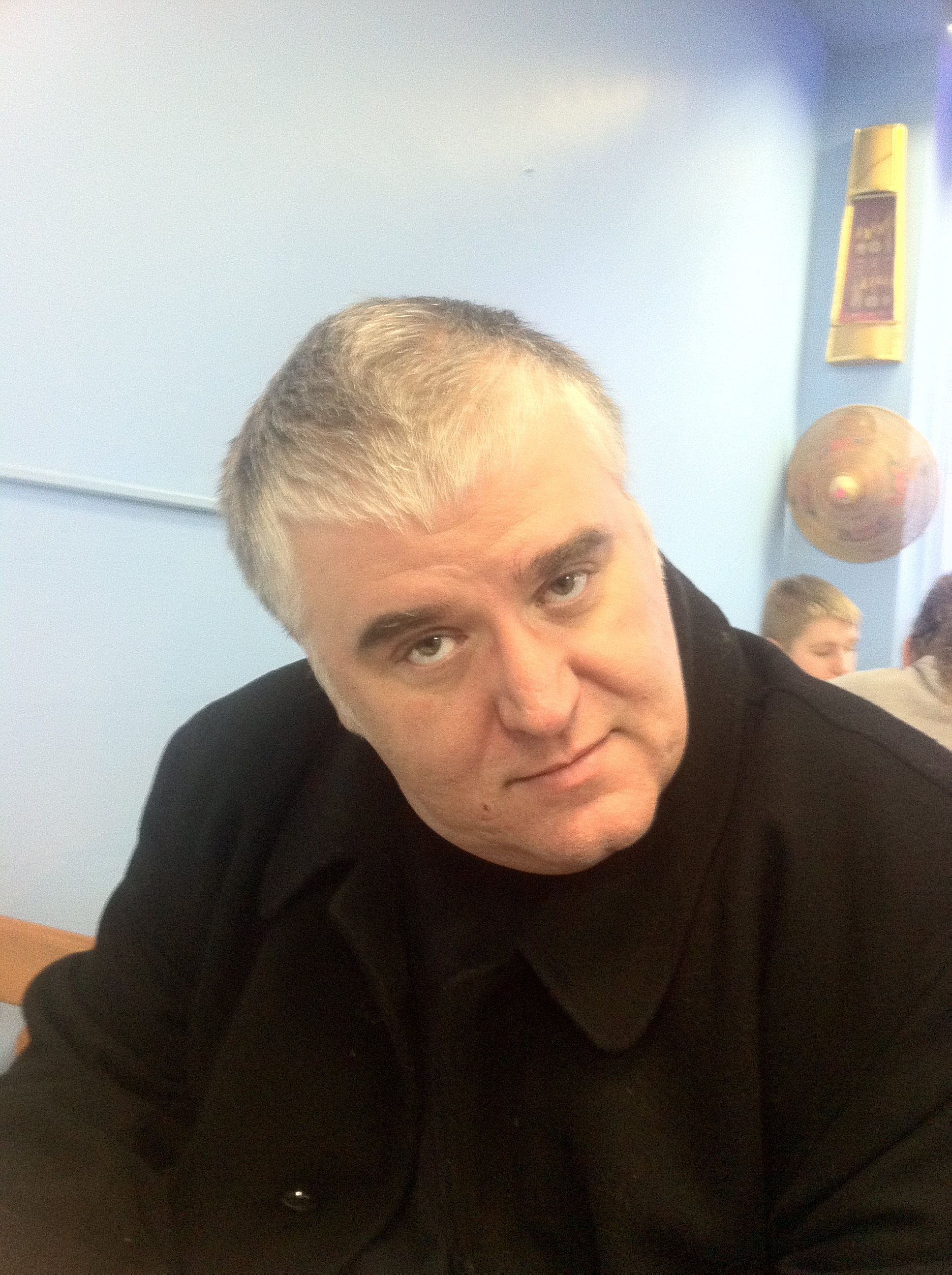
Joey Manley in 2011

In a 2006 interview with The Comics Journal, Joey Manley stated that he did not believe that an optimal business model for webcomics exists. Manley stated that he chose subscription models for his early projects because online advertising rates were low and bandwidth was very expensive at the time. Manley felt the need to defend his business model often, because the subscription model was unpopular among some ideological groups, and he quickly became known as "the subscriptions guy" in his community. However, as advertising revenue increased, Manley began adopting that model more in his services. Manley noted that he would have wanted to get into the print market as well, but was not able to afford it. One year earlier, Manley said: "You'll lose a lot less money publishing on the Web than publishing a printed comic."

In the same interview, Manley spoke about the nature and future of webcomics as a medium. Stating that while people understand that the experience of reading a comic versus reading a webcomic is "sort of analogous," Manley said that people "come to [the two mediums] with different expectations." Elaborating, Manley said that "sequential art on the screen kind of serves a different function; maybe right now it's a little more disposable, in the way that television for many years was more disposable [than film]. ... Webcomics aren't a replacement for what already exists, in the same way that television didn't destroy movies."

== Death ==
On November 7, 2013, Manley died of complications from pneumonia in a hospital in Louisville. Aged 48, he was survived by his spouse Joe Botts.

== Legacy ==
Manley received the title of Kentucky Colonel for his entrepreneurial efforts and his free speech advocacy. He was listed by Comixpedia as one of the most influential people in webcomics from 2004 to 2006.

Manley was well-regarded within the webcomic community, and his death was commemorated by figures such as Scott McCloud, Lea Hernandez, and Joshua Hale Fialkov. He had cultivated hundreds of relationships within webcomic circles and successfully brought webcomic creators together following the dot-com bubble. Josh Roberts stated that Manley was particularly apt at communicating with people, cultivating hundreds of relationships within the field. Following his death, retailer and convention organizer Chris Butcher called Manley "a true pioneer of webcomics," and cartoonist T. Campbell praised Manley for changing the business model and bringing webcomic creators together when advertisement rates were in free fall.
