= Galaxion =

Science fiction comic book written by Tara Tallan

Publication information
- Publisher: Helikon Comics
- Publication date: Early Salmagundi series: July 1993 to October 1994 Galaxion Series: May 1997 - November 1999 Galaxion (Webcomic) debut: September 2006
- No. of issues: Salmagundi early editions — 7 Galaxion (series) — 11; Galaxion (Specials) — 2 Galaxion (Graphic Novel collection) — 3
- Main character(s): Darvin Deloren, Anna Ito, Patty Kusene, Vessa Khavis, Fusella Mierter, Brig. General Scavina Nelson, Aria Schafer, and Zandarin Wilder

Creative team
- Created by: Tara Tallan, Wendy Linkous, and David Tallan (assistant)
- Written by: Tara Tallan
- Artist(s): Tara Tallan

Galaxion is a science fiction comic book and webcomic series written and drawn by Canadian Tara Tallan (née Jenkins).

The story follows the crew of an interstellar ship, the Galaxion, as they test a new experimental hyperdrive engine. The story's narrative presents the Galaxion's geologist Aria Schafer's point of view.

== Versions ==
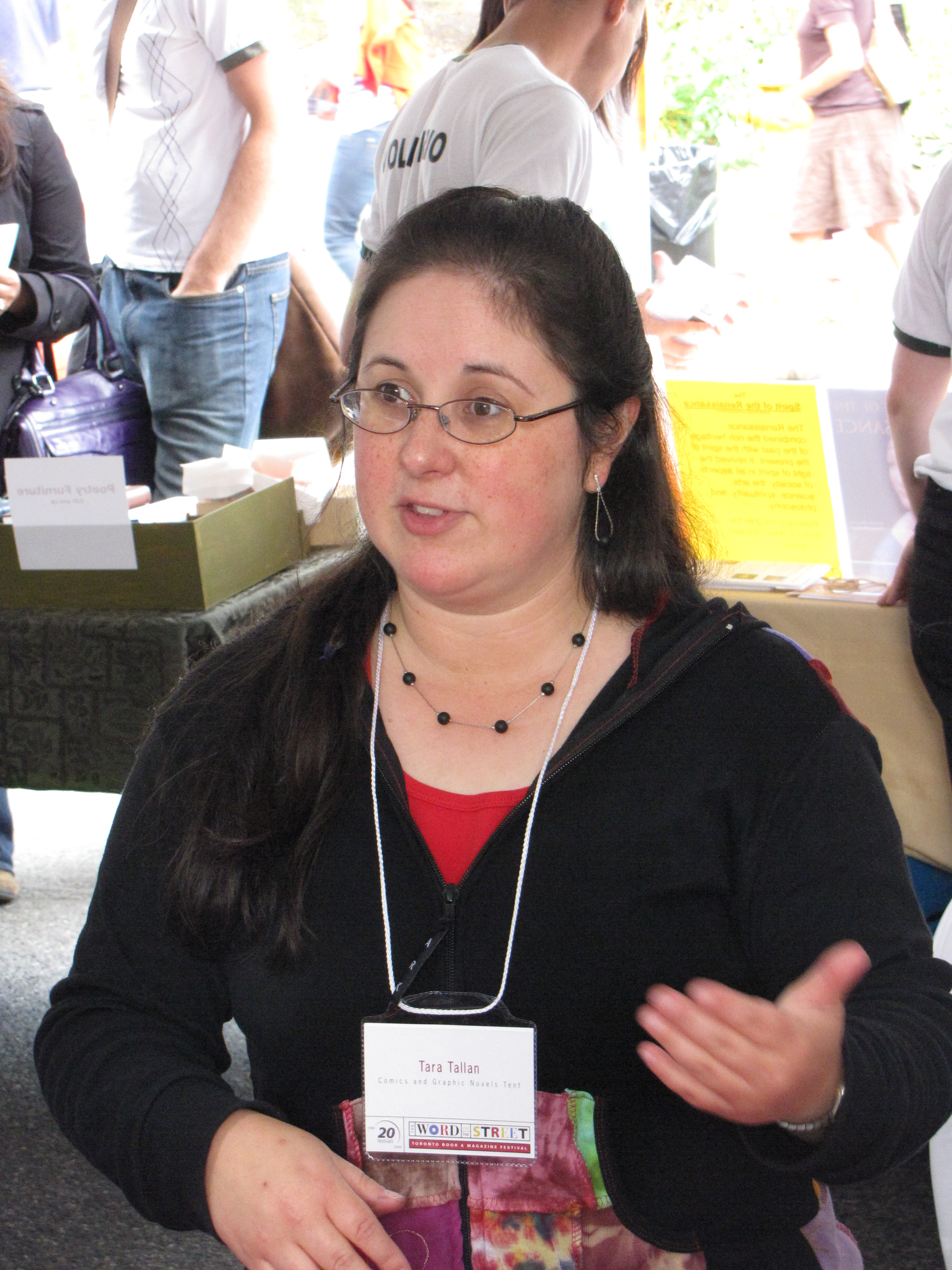
Tara Tallan, creator of Galaxion, in September 2009

There have been three versions of the Galaxion story.

Around 1993, the story first appeared as one half of a photocopied, digest size flip comic book Salmagundi.

In the late 1990s, the story was relaunched in a self-published full-sized comic. There was also a "flip book" with Amy Unbounded by Rachel Hartman. The first six issues were collected in a graphic novel, Galaxion: The Graphic Novel Volume One. This second version of Galaxion made it to eleven full issues but ceased publication in 1999 as the demands of parenthood pulled Tara away from the drawing table.

In 2006, Tara launched a third version of Galaxion as a bi-weekly (later weekly) webcomic, originally hosted at Girlamatic. The comic went on hiatus in August 2018

== Characters ==
Note: This describes roles of the characters in the webcomic version of Galaxion. The roles have been different in earlier versions. For example, the print comic shows Scavina in command of the Galaxion from the beginning and Zandarin leading the Survey Contact Team.

- Darvin Deloren - civilian employee of Interplanetary Patrol; right-hand man of General Nelson, an old friend of Zandarin and Fusella.
- Anna Ito - Chief Engineer.
- Vessa Khavis - leader of the Survey Contact Team.
- Fusella Mierter - captain of the Galaxion.
- Brig. General Scavina Nelson - leading the Nelson Project, Interplanetary Patrol's hyperspace jump travel experiment.
- Aria Schafer - Galaxion's Survey Contact Team.
- Zandarin Wilder - civilian employee of Interplanetary Patrol.
