= Project Wonderful =

Online advertising service

- Original author(s): Ryan North
- Initial release: 2006; 19 years ago
- Operating system: Cross-platform (web-based application)
- Type: Online advertising

Project Wonderful was an advertising service created by programmer and webcomic author Ryan North in late 2006. Headquartered in Toronto, Ontario, the service supported thousands of webcomics and blogs with auctioned online advertisements, until it was shut down in 2018.

== Concept and development ==
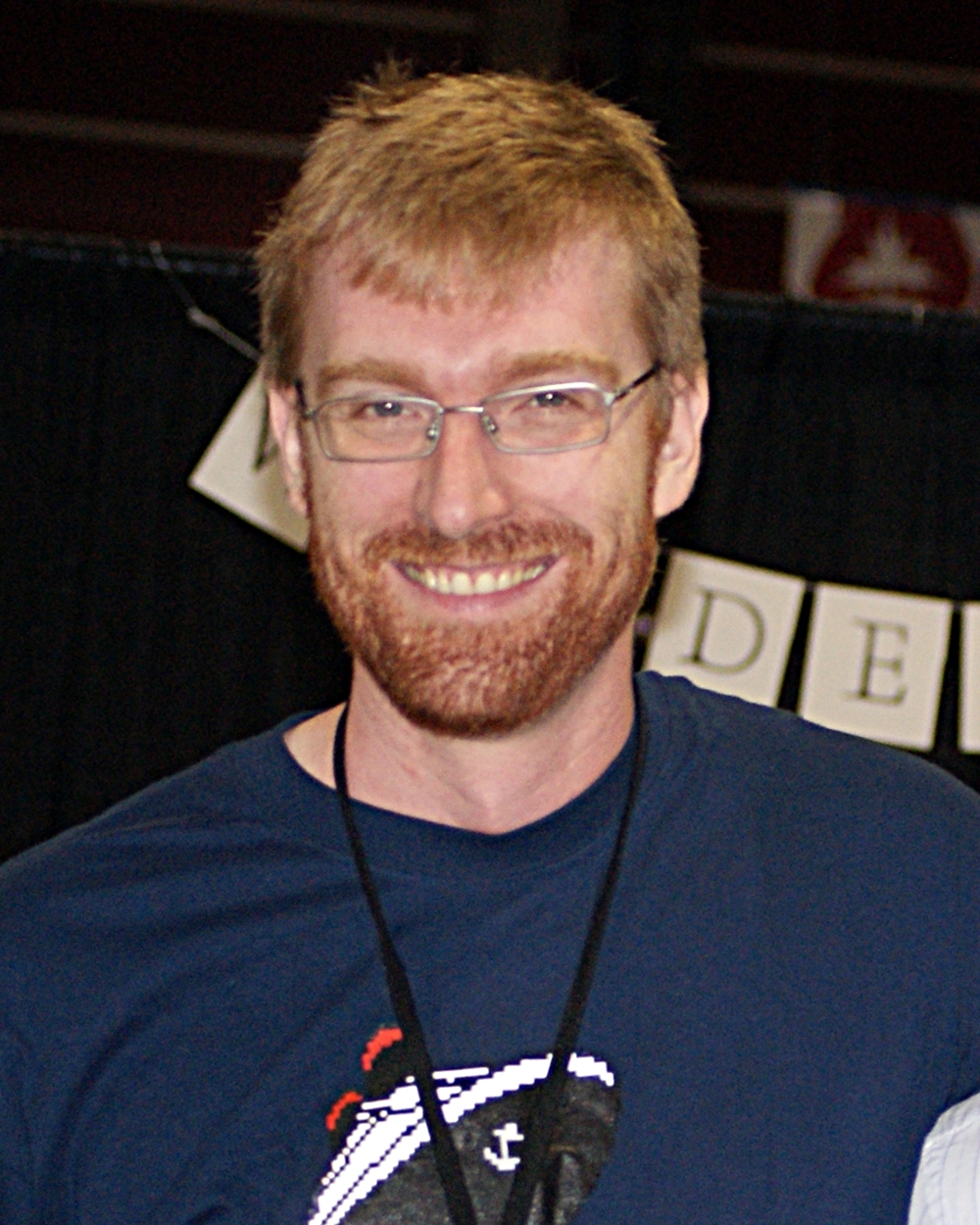
Ryan North in 2011

In early 2006, Ryan North was talking with a friend about how they severely disliked existing online advertisement services such as Google ads and AdSense, because advertisements on those platforms are priced based on user clicks or displays, and "the Internet isn't really designed to keep track of who clicked where, when, and who viewed what page when." Project Wonderful launched 8 months later. Rather than paying for clicks, Project Wonderful allowed websites to auction advertisement space. Advertisers were able to bid on a particular ad block on a particular website and, as long as their bid was the highest, they got to decide what is shown on it. Being invite-only, Project Wonderful initially only had a few dozen advertisers participating in the "perpetual auction" of ad space, though this number grew rapidly.

Project Wonderful was built on open source software, coupled with MySQL databases and an Apache front-end. The service was designed specifically for cartoonists, but in turn worked well for any independent website. Implementing new features into Project Wonderful took up most of North's time in the years following its initial release, together with his webcomic Dinosaur Comics.

== Usage ==
Many webcomics, including Awkward Zombie, Loading Artist, Saturday Morning Breakfast Cereal, Questionable Content, Qwantz, MS Paint Adventures, Sinfest, and A Softer World used Project Wonderful as an advertising service. The service was used on platforms such as ComicSpace and Graphic Smash immediately after launch. Shaenon Garrity worked on implementing Project Wonderful on the subscription service Modern Tales in 2007. At its peak, Project Wonderful had around 10,000 publishers, of which over 5,000 were webcomics, and about 10 times that many advertisers.

== Shutdown ==
On June 11, 2018, Project Wonderful announced that it would be shutting down on August 1, 2018. North noted the rise of large social media platforms such as Facebook keeping readers within their systems as a cause for the diminishing of the blogosphere. As fewer users visit dozens or hundreds of different websites a day, supporting independent websites with advertisements became more difficult.
