= Andrew Farago =

American curator, author (born 1976)

- Born: May 12, 1976 (age 50); Ohio, United States
- Education: Colorado College
- Occupations: Curator, author, comic historian
- Spouse: Shaenon K. Garrity
- Children: 1

Andrew Farago (born 1976) is an American curator, author, and comic historian. He is the former curator of the Cartoon Art Museum in San Francisco, former chairman of the Northern California chapter of the National Cartoonists Society, and husband of webcomics author and illustrator Shaenon K. Garrity.

Farago began his writing career in the mid-2000s by writing for various print and online magazines. He has authored various books on cartooning, most notably 2014's Teenage Mutant Ninja Turtles: The Ultimate Visual History, a book that chronicles the creative and business history of the Teenage Mutant Ninja Turtles franchise.

== Early life and education ==
Farago was born in the 1970s in Ohio, United States. He graduated with a degree in studio art from Colorado College in Colorado Springs, Colorado.

== Cartoon Art Museum ==
Andrew Farago worked for the Cartoon Art Museum in San Francisco from the summer of 2000 to 2026, starting as a volunteer. It is here that he met his future wife. He moved from volunteer status to a paid position in 2001, and in 2005 he was formally named Curator of the Cartoon Art Museum. In his time with CAM he curated over 100 exhibits. He left the museum in June 2026, after being arrested on invasion of privacy charges.

== Writing career ==
=== Magazines ===
Farago has written for a number of magazines both online and in print related to cartoons such as Animation World Network, The Comics Journal, and The Comics Reporter. Topics covered have included the San Francisco-based comic book convention WonderCon, interviews with Patton Oswalt, Kyle Baker, and Keith Knight, as well as a retrospective on the 20th anniversary of Who Framed Roger Rabbit In recent years, he has penned a number of artist obituaries for The Comics Journal, including articles on Paul Coker Jr., Vincent Kukua, Jesse Hamm, Sharon Smith Kane, and Trina Robbins.

=== Comic work ===
Farago's first professional comic writing came in the mid-2000s, co-writing with his wife for multiple editions of the Marvel Holiday Special. In 2007 he launched The Chronicles of William Bazillion, a webcomic surrounding the exploits of the titular character William Bazillion, which concluded in 2009. He also served as co-editor of the second volume of Spark Generators, a fundraising anthology published by the Cartoon Art Museum with the aid of a Xeric Foundation grant.

=== Notable works ===
The Looney Tunes Treasury was the first full-length work by Farago, which told the fictional histories of the Looney Tunes characters in the voices of the characters themselves.

In June 2014 Insight Editions published Teenage Mutant Ninja Turtles: The Ultimate Visual History, authored by Farago. Likely the first comprehensive history of the franchise, Farago "conducted over 60 interviews over the course of two years" in the process of writing it.

The release was designed to coincide with the release of the Michael Bay produced rebooted movie, and was pushed back when the movie was so that it also coincided with the 30th Anniversary of the franchise. This book featuring art from the Teenage Mutant Ninja Turtles franchise, including the various comics, animated series, and movies, as well as interviews with the creators of the series (Kevin Eastman and Peter Laird) and numerous others who have been involved in the series over the years. The book was met with largely favorable reaction in the press and from fans, earning a gold medal for Best Popular Culture Book from the Independent Publisher Book Awards as well as a Harvey Award nomination for Best Biographical, Historical, or Journalistic Presentation.

== 2026 arrest ==
On June 3, 2026 Farago was arrested for illegally recording guests using the bathroom during a birthday party that was held on May 23."

According to court papers, Farago emailed guests after the party, writing "I hid my phone in our bathroom for the purpose of spying on our guests, my closest friends in the world. I had never done anything like that before and don't know what possessed me to do it. This was an inexcusable violation of your privacy and our friendship and I am prepared to face whatever consequences will come from this tremendous lapse in judgement."

An arrest warrant was served accusing him of 20 counts of invasion of privacy involving a hidden camera. Also a search warrant was served, and police seized dozen of electronic devices.

== Awards and honors ==
Farago received an Inkpot Award for Fandom Services at the 2015 San Diego Comic-Con.

Teenage Mutant Ninja Turtles: The Ultimate Visual History, written by Farago, won the 2015 Harvey Award for Best Biographical, Historical, or Journalistic Presentation.

== Personal life ==
Farago is married to Shaenon K. Garrity, herself a webcomic creator and writer.

Both Farago and Garrity have both been big supporters of Richard Thompson's collaborative project Team Cul de Sac which aims to help find a cure for Parkinson's disease.

== Bibliography ==
- Spark Generators II (2002)
- Marvel Holiday Special 2005 (2005)
- Marvel Holiday Special 2006 (2006)
- Marvel Holiday Special 2007 (2007)
- The 100 Greatest Looney Tunes (2010)
- Looney Tunes Treasury: Includes Amazing Interactive Treasures from the Warner Bros. Vault! (2010)
- Teenage Mutant Ninja Turtles: The Ultimate Visual History (2014)
- The Complete Peanuts Family Album (2017)
- The Art of Harley Quinn (2017)
- Totally Awesome: The Greatest Cartoons of the Eighties (2017)
- The Zombie Gnome Defense Guide: A Complete Reference to Surviving the Tiniest Apocalypse (2018)
- Batman: The Definitive History of The Dark Knight in Comics, Film, and Beyond (2019)
- DC: Collecting The Multiverse: The Art of Sideshow (2020)
- Sideshow Fine Art Prints, Volume 2 (2021)
- Sideshow Collectibles Presents: Capturing Archetypes, Volume 4: Demigods and Defenders: The Balance of Power (2021)
- Batman: The Definitive History of The Dark Knight in Comics, Film, and Beyond, Updated Edition (2022)
- Teenage Mutant Ninja Turtles: The Ultimate Visual History, Revised and Expanded Edition (2024)
- A Minecraft Movie: From Block to Big Screen (2025)
- Snoopy, the Story of My Life: The Myth, the Legend, the Beagle! (2025)
