= Dorothy Gambrell =

American cartoonist

Dorothy Gambrell is a cartoonist who writes and draws the online comic strip Cat and Girl in addition to the blog very small array. Her work has appeared in the literary journal Backwards City Review and the Anton Chekhov anthology The Other Chekhov, and had appeared regularly in the literary journal Grasslimb. As of 2023, she is a contributing graphics editor for Bloomberg Businessweek.

Additionally, Dorothy played guitar in the self-styled "last uncool band in Brooklyn," The Vandervoorts. Following her move to Tucson, Gambrell became part of The Basement Apartments. She has also played in the band Jenny and the Holzers.

She grew up on Long Island, New York, and attended Williams College. She has lived Tucson, Arizona and in Brooklyn, New York.

== Cat and Girl ==
In the second quarter of 1999, Gambrell started the webcomic Cat and Girl. The title characters are Cat, a giant anthropomorphic cat given to zany schemes and indulgences (particularly eating lead-based paint), and Girl, a cynical girl with a philosophical bent and a penchant for postmodernism. Gambrell insists Girl is not modeled after herself, an assertion she backs up by occasionally inserting a character based on herself into the comic. Cat and Girl mixes usually dry humor with literary allusions.

Gambrell described the subject of her webcomic as "a cat, a girl, and an experimental meta-narrative." In Cat and Girl, Gambrell frequently jokes about obscure subject matter, sometimes based on "cultural references that maybe twelve people will get." Gambrell alternates between more and less obscure jokes, not wanting to censor herself nor talking down to her readers. A recurring theme in Cat and Girl is nostalgia, as Gambrell emphasizes the powerful ways in which people deceive themselves when reminiscing on the past.

Gambrell also created the webcomic The New Adventures of Death, which she published through Modern Tales under a subscription fee.

In 2005, Cat and Girl and The New Adventures of Death were together named among the best webcomics of the year by Joe Zabel. In 2019, Cat and Girl won a National Cartoonists Society Division Award in the "On-Line Comics – Short Form" category.
