= Eunice Young Smith =

- Born: June 10, 1902; La Salle
- Died: November 8, 1993 (aged 91); South Bend
- Occupation: Writer
- Children: Sharon Smith Kane

Eunice Young Smith (June 10, 1902 – November 8, 1993) was an American writer and illustrator of children's books.

Eunice Young Smith was born on June 10, 1902, in LaSalle, Illinois, the daughter of Arthur Merriman Young and Katherine Genevieve Whitmarsh Young. She attended Rosary College and Lake View Commercial Art School in Chicago. In 1927, she married engineer Stuyvesant C. Smith and they would have two children.

Smith published at least seventeen children's novels, which she illustrated herself. Set prior to World War I, her Jennifer series is a series of novels about a midwestern US farm girl named Jennifer Hill. In the final book of the series, High Heels for Jennifer (1964), Jennifer helps her rich friend train a chestnut hunter named High Heels. In her Shoon: Wild Pony of the Moors (1965), a boy named Loren saves money to buy an Exmoor pony. Her novel A Trumpet Sounds (1985) is a fictionalized version of the life of Roland Hayes, one of the earliest successful African-American opera singers.

She also illustrated filmstrips and books by others and she was a painter and printmaker.

Eunice Young Smith died on 8 November 1993 in South Bend, Indiana.

== Bibliography ==
- Moppet. Chicago: Whitman, 1950.
- Denny's Story. Chicago: Whitman, 1952.
- Sam's Big Worry. Chicago: Whitman, 1953.
- The House with the Secret Room. Indianapolis: Bobbs, 1956.
- The Little Red Drum. Chicago: Whitman, 1961.
- Where From? Chicago: Rand, 1962.
- Where To, Tillie Turtle? Indianapolis: Bobbs, 1964.
- Shoon, Wild Pony of the Moors. Indianapolis: Bobbs, 1965.
- To Each a Season. Indianapolis: Bobbs, 1965.
- The Knowing One. New York: Meredith, 1967.
- A Trumpet Sounds. Westport: Lawrence Hill, 1985.

=== Jennifer novels ===
- The Jennifer Wish. Indianapolis: Bobbs-Merrill, 1949.
- The Jennifer Gift. Indianapolis: Bobbs-Merrill, 1950.
- The Jennifer Prize. Indianapolis: Bobbs-Merrill, 1951.
- Jennifer Is Eleven. Indianapolis: Bobbs-Merrill, 1952.
- Jennifer Dances. Indianapolis: Bobbs-Merrill, 1954.
- High Heels for Jennifer. Indianapolis: Bobbs-Merrill, 1964.
