= Webcomics Nation =

Website

Webcomic Nation
- 2013 logo

- October 2005 screenshot
- Owner: Joey Manley
- Website: www.webcomicsnation.com
- Launched: July 29, 2005
- Current status: discontinued, URL occupied by malware site

Webcomics Nation was a webcomic hosting and automation service launched on July 29, 2005 by Joey Manley. Unlike Manley's previous webcomic sites, Webcomics Nation was based on user-generated content and relied on online advertisement revenue, which increased in viability in the second half of the 2000s. Webcomics Nation quickly became Manley's most financially successful website, and encouraged him to turn his Modern Tales sites partially free as well. Webcomics Nation began merging into Josh Roberts' ComicSpace in 2007, but this process took longer than hoped and Webcomics Nation eventually closed down in 2013.

== Concept ==
Though Joey Manley was well known for creating a family of webcomic subscription services (consisting of Modern Tales, Serializer, Girlamatic, and Graphic Smash), he stated that the main reason he focused exclusively on the subscription business model was because online advertisement rates were low and bandwidth was expensive in the early 2000s. When online advertisement became more lucrative in the mid-2000s, and the subscriber numbers of his existing platforms remained stagnant, Manley decided to transition into a business model more similar to that of Keenspot. Webcomics Nation was designed to host and distribute webcomics in a similar fashion to how services like Blogger and Flickr host blogs and photos respectively. Webcomics Nation offered unlimited Web space and support to any cartoonist for $7 USD per month, but the website was mainly known as a free hosting service, supported entirely through advertisement money. As the revenue of free webcomics supported through advertising eclipsed the increasingly unpopular subscription model, Manley eventually turned Modern Tales into a free website as well.

Webcomics Nation also aided cartoonists with little to no experience with web technologies to set up a webcomic. Talking with Publishers Weekly, Manley stated that "A lot of people don't have that kind of dedication to technology. The younger cartoonists do, but some older cartoonists don't."

== History ==
Manley launched WebcomicsNation.com on July 29, 2005 after having the service beta tested by a large number of major cartoonists (including James Kochalka, Lea Hernandez, Roger Langridge, Tom Hart, Cayetano Garza, Daniel Merlin Goodbrey, and Spike Trotman). Manley advertised the service in part through its use of modern Web technologies such as XML, RSS, and "web services". Paying users were offered unlimited bandwidth and disk storage, the ability to lock their own webcomics behind a subscription wall or to sell advertisements on their own pages, an automated email list, a scheduling system, and an archive management system, among other features. Webcomics Nation quickly became Manley's most profitable project.

The free version of Webcomics Nation became available in 2006. Eric Millikin, beta-testing new Webcomics Nation features in late 2006, described the evolving user interface as closer to that of Adobe products than a typical Web-based interface. By 2006, many cartoonists were running webcomics on Webcomics Nation, including Modern Tales usuals such as Shaenon K. Garrity, Lea Hernandez, and Tom Hart, as well as print comics veterans like Jay Stephens, Batton Lash, and Ingalill Roesberg.

In 2007, Manley collaborated with OnlineComics.net-creator Josh Roberts to expand on ComicSpace, Roberts' comics-oriented social media and publishing platform. Webcomics Nation was merged into this platform, alongside some of Manley's other websites, and ComicSpace was planned to "relaunch" in the second quarter of 2008 as an "all-in-one solution for webcomic creators [and] social networkers interested in comics". In January 2009, Manley wrote that the merger was "one of the more technically difficult projects" they had undertaken, and that it was taking longer than he had hoped. Webcomics Nation and Manley's other websites closed down in April 2013, and he died in November that same year.
