= Girlamatic =

Webcomic subscription service

- 2003 logo
- Owner: Joey Manley
- Editors: Lea Hernandez, Lisa Jonté, Diana McQueen
- Website: Archived (April 2003)
- Launched: March 31, 2003
- Current status: Discontinued

Girlamatic (sometimes stylized as GirlAMatic or Girl-A-Matic) was a webcomic subscription service launched by Joey Manley and Lea Hernandez in March 2003. It was the third online magazine Manley established as part of his Modern Tales family of websites. Girlamatic was created as a place where both female artists and readers could feel comfortable and featured a diverse mix of genres. When the site launched, the most recent webcomic pages and strips were free, and the website's archives were available by subscription. The editorial role was held by Hernandez from 2003 until 2006, when it was taken over by Arcana Jayne-creator Lisa Jonté, one of the site's original artists. In 2009, Girlamatic was relaunched as a free digital magazine, this time edited by Spades-creator Diana McQueen. The archives of the webcomics that ran on Girlamatic remained freely available until the website was discontinued in 2013.

== Concept ==
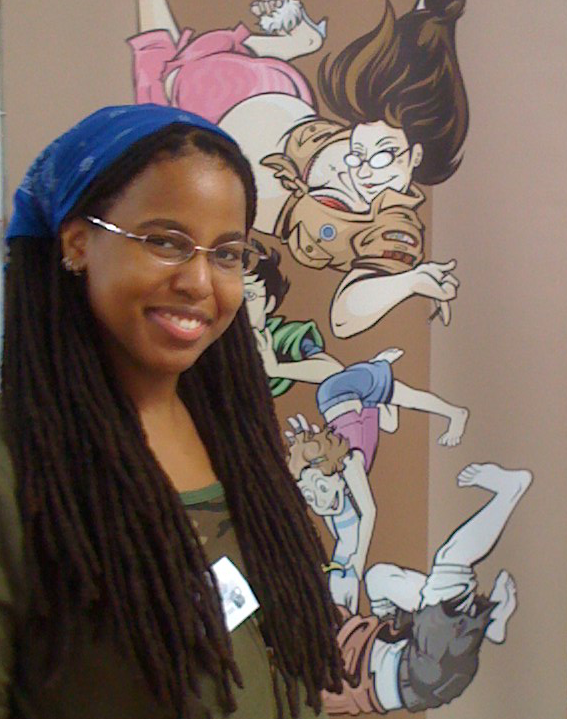
Spike Trotman published her first major webcomics on Girlamatic.

Lea Hernandez's vision when creating Girlamatic was to create a website that she herself would like to read and where both female artists and readers could feel comfortable. The website allowed readers and creators to avoid the male-dominated direct market of superhero comic books. Talking with Publishers Weekly in 2004, Hernandez said "an anthology of girl-friendly comics would sink like a stone in the direct market." Hernandez said she had gathered artists of "the new mainstream" and she hoped they would find a wider audience for their work through Girlamatic.

The name "Girlamatic" was chosen to signify the difference between it and other comic platforms. Hernandez initially wanted to name the website "ModernGirls", but this name was already taken by a porn site. Webcartoonist Shaenon K. Garrity noted that she liked the website's name for its "juxtaposition of squishy girliness with hard retro tech," saying that the website has always blended a large variety of themes, including "cuteness and horror, comedy and melodrama, gruesome darkness and giggly light, femininity and masculinity." Lisa Jonté stated that Girlamatic's inclusion criteria were essentially "whatever appeals to the editor ... we want engaging stories with well-developed characters." Jonté did note that she mainly wanted to stay away from female sex-appeal and "frilly pink melodrama."

Girlamatic was the third webcomic subscription service launched and managed by Joey Manley, following the success of Modern Tales and Serializer.net. This subscription model was revolutionary at the time, and was one of the first profitable subscription models for webcomics.

== History ==
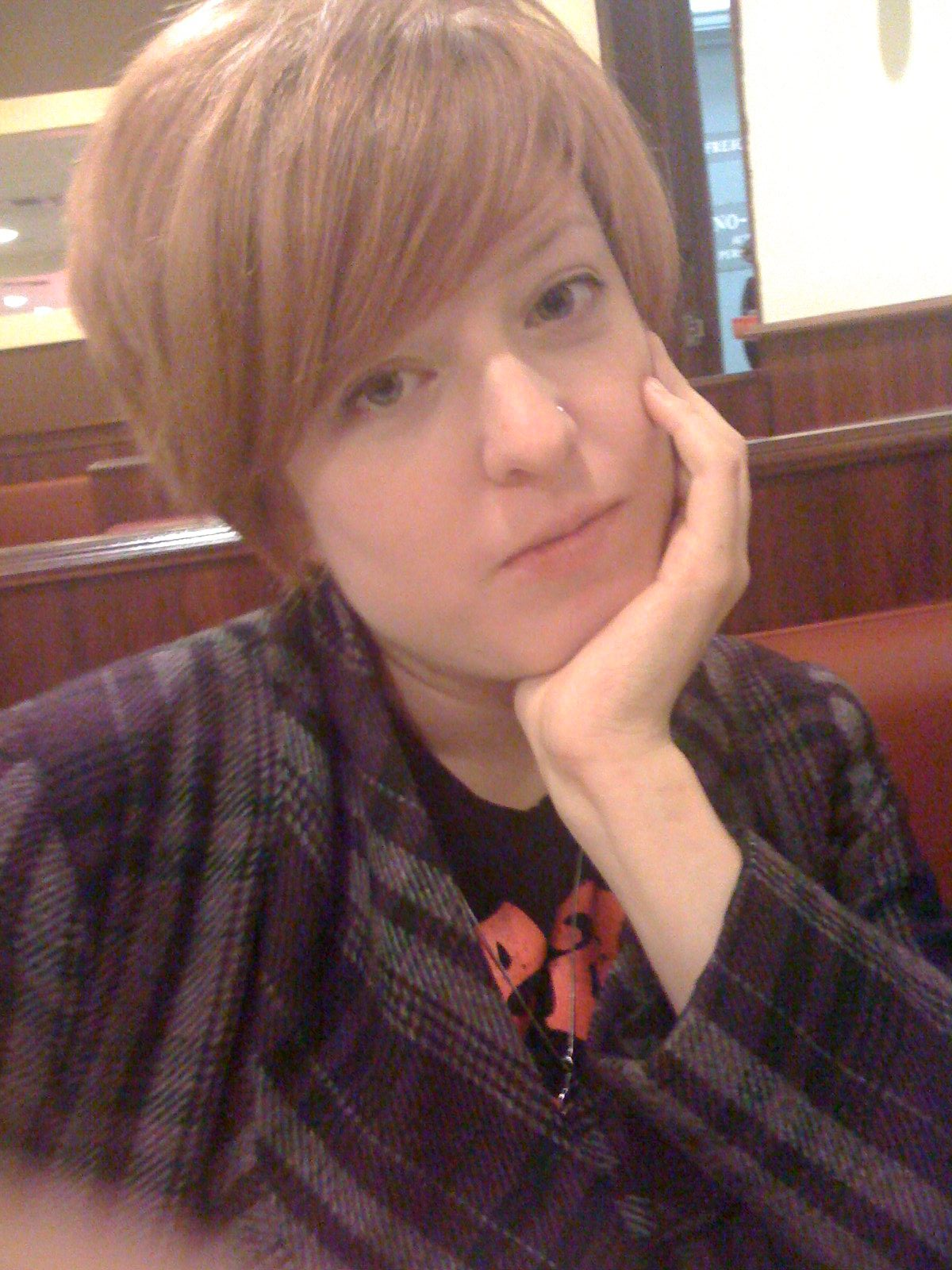
Diana McQueen was editor of Girlamatic in 2009

Girlamatic launched on March 31, 2003, with sixteen artists: Donna Barr, Vera Brosgol, Kris Dresen, Shaenon K. Garrity, Lisa Jonté, Layla Lawlor, Jenn Manley Lee, Dylan Meconis, Andre Richard, Harley Sparx, Spike Trotman, Jason Thompson, Carla Speed McNeil, Rachel Hartman, Jesse Hamm, and Tochi. Girlamatic archives could be accessed for $2.95 USD per month or $29.95 per year. The service had ten regular features in its first year. Hernandez posted an open call for new submissions in 2004, and eleven new features were added to Girlamatic in April 2004.

Arcana Jayne creator Lisa Jonté took over Hernandez's role as editor in early 2006. At this point, Girlamatic sent out an open call to creators once or twice per year. Brigid Alverson of Comic Book Resources noted that Girlamatic went "quiet" between 2007 and 2009. During this period, all of Joey Manley's websites merged into comics-oriented social media and publishing platform ComicSpace, which he developed in collaboration with OnlineComics.net creator Josh Robert. Girlamatic relaunched on July 31, 2009. This time, artist Diana McQueen (creator of Spades) took over as the editor, and subscription fees were dropped entirely. Despite this, McQueen said Girlamatic had not become a hosting website or artist community, but remained a magazine. McQueen also brought in two bloggers: Nick Popio of Hobotaku posted reviews of manga, anime, and western comics, while Elizabeth Shupe wrote blog posts about dolls. Girlamatic was the first of Manley's Modern Tales-family of subscription services to relaunch on ComicSpace.

McQueen believed the subscription model of the Modern Tales-family had failed and too few readers were willing to pay for online media. Girlamatic went on to have limited online advertising handled by the ComicSpace ad network. McQueen aspired to have print editions of Girlamatic in the tradition of Shojo Beat, but none were ever released. ComicSpace never achieved success, and Girlamatic closed alongside Manley's other websites in April 2013.

== Webcomics ==
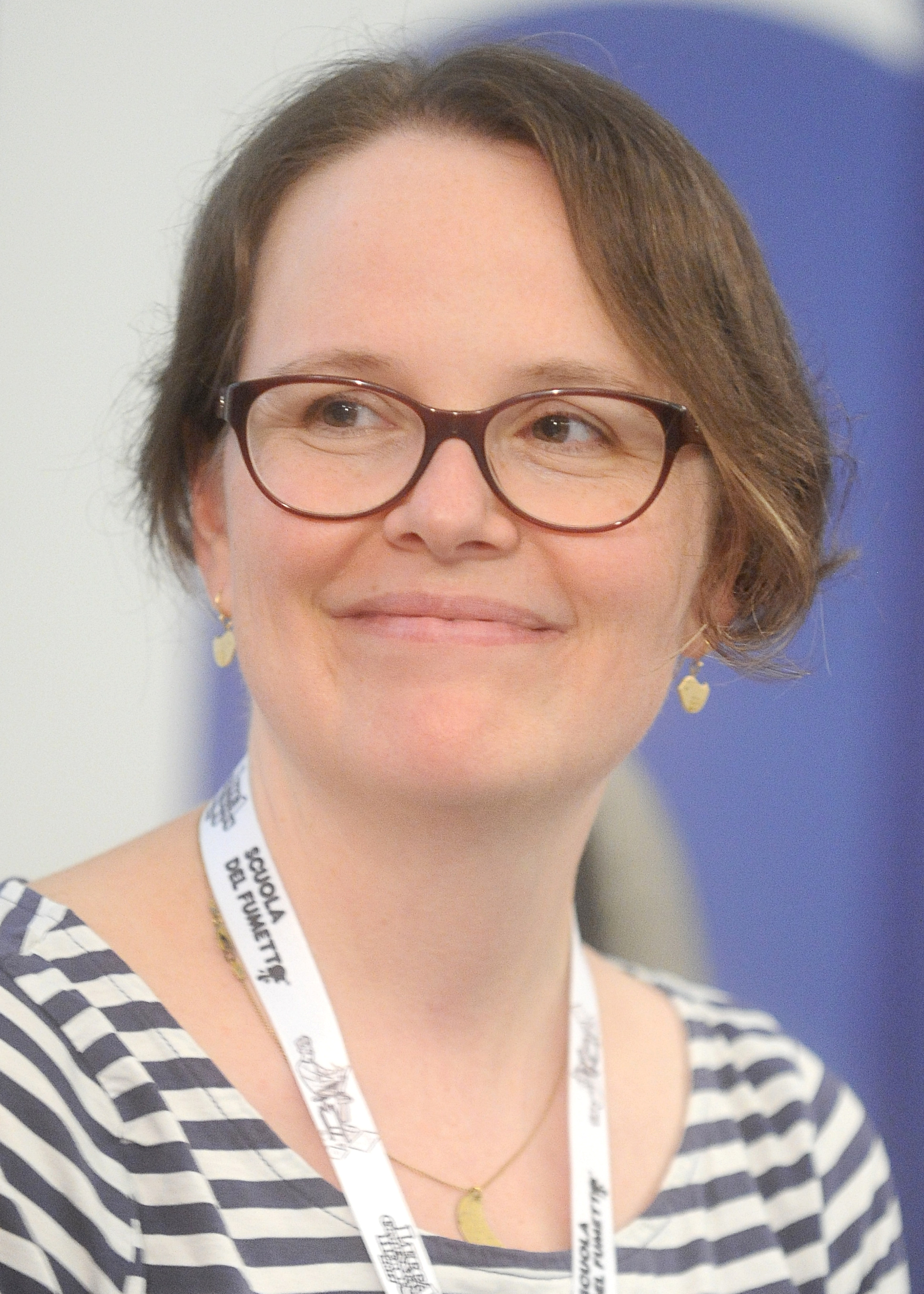
Raina Telgemeier stated that serializing a weekly webcomic on Girlamatic "[offered] just enough structure to finally tell a story" she had in mind for years.

Several cartoonists made their professional debut through Girlamatic, while other artists serialized their existing work on the service.

- Von Allen's 2007 graphic novel the road to god knows… was serialized on Girlamatic.
- Svetlana Chmakova's first professional work was publishing Chasing Rainbows on Girlamatic.
- Barry Deutch began publishing Hereville on Girlamatic in 2004.
- Shaenon K. Garrity published a spin-off of her webcomic Narbonic on Girlamatic, titled Li'l Mell and Sergio.
- Rachel Hartman published Return of the Mad Bun on Girlamatic as a follow-up to her print comic series Amy Unbounded.
- Lea Hernandez published a sequel to her comic book Rumble Girls: Silky Warrior Tansie on the website, titled Rumble Girls: Runaway Lightning Ohmry.
- Hope Larson published I Was There & Just Returned on Girlamatic while a senior in art school.
- Layla Lawlor published Kismet: Hunter's Moon on Girlamatic.
- Dave Roman began releasing Astronaut Elementary on Girlamatic in 2004.
- Tara Tallan ran her print comic Galaxion on Girlamatic from 2006 to 2010.
- Raina Telgemeier began serializing her Baby Sitter's Club and Smile graphic novels on Girlamatic in 2004.
- Jason Thompson moved his 2001 webcomic The Stiff onto Girlamatic.
- Spike Trotman published her first big webcomic projects through Girlamatic, Sparkneedle and Lucas and Odessa.
- Arcana Jayne, a strip by Girlamatic editor and former Sequential Tart contributor Lisa R. Jonté. Set in a 1930s-meets-sorcery world, the comic follows the adventures of the titular Arcana Jayne, a witch and treasure seeking hedonist. The character was one Jonté had previously created, utilising her creation for the new strip.

Two new webcomics were added to the Girlamatic roster during its 2009 relaunch: The Continentals by Darryl Hughes and Monique McNaughton, and Godseeker by Lisa Gilbert and Terry Blauer.

== Reception ==
Some critics were unsure what to make of the website when it launched in 2003. American editorial cartoonist Ted Rall initially proclaimed the website a "ghetto for women cartoonists". In 2005, blogger Eric Burns said he felt uncomfortable entering a space that was mainly set up for women. He also voiced concern that initiatives like Girlamatic might section off and divide the webcomic community, making it less likely for male readers to come across the works of female webcartoonists.

In 2006, comic book author Gail Simone called Girlamatic "one of the most important venues for female-friendly comics created to date." Girlamatic has received various Lulu awards and nominations for being among the "most women-friendly and reader-friendly work in comics."
