= Sharon Smith Kane =

American children's book author and illustrator (1932–2021)

- Kane in the late 1940s
- Born: Sharon Smith; February 18, 1932 South Bend, Indiana, U.S.
- Died: November 3, 2021 (aged 89) Plano, Texas, U.S.
- Notable works: Buttons an’ Beaux, Little Mommy
- Spouses: Russell Koester (1955-1959); Herb Kāne (1954-1979)
- Children: 2

Sharon Smith Kane (February 18, 1932 – November 3, 2021) was an American cartoonist and children's book author and illustrator known for being one of the nation's youngest syndicated cartoonists.

Kane began drawing at an early age, encouraged by her "creative family" and her mother who was herself an artist. Her first published drawing was in Highlights for Children when she was nine years old. She drew illustrations for the local newspaper and also had her drawings published in Child Life, Seventeen Magazine and The Christian Science Monitor while she was a young teenager. She drew illustrations for advertising in her local paper the South Bend Tribune. Her illustrations earned her honors in the state Easter Seals design contest as well as an honorable mention in the Easter Seals national design contest. She won four Gold Key Awards in the Scholastic Art Contest.

She wrote a humorous advice column for her school newspaper which she illustrated. She then began to create a single-panel strip for the school paper which was also published in the Tribune's teen section under the heading Atomic Teens. The paper's editor sent the strip to several newspaper syndicates. The McNaught Syndicate signed Kane to a syndication contract in 1949 when she was 17 years old. She signed a ten-year contract to produce six panels a week and the comic became known as Buttons an’ Beaux centered on teenage life and dating in the early 1950s. She wrote the panel through high school and into college but while the circulation for her comic had grown to twenty-five papers, it wasn't enough to support herself so she retired the column in 1952 while she was in college.

Kane looked for book illustration work but was having difficulty getting noticed. She wrote and illustrated her own book Where Are You Going Today? which was published under the name Sharon Smith Koester in 1957. She continued to work for Rand McNally and Golden Press and published books she wrote and illustrated frequently in the 1980s. Her most popular book, Little Mommy, was originally published in 1967 and was still in print in 2021. Her final book, Kitty & Me, was published by Henry Holt and Company in 2014.

In 2018, she donated an archive original Buttons an’ Beaux cartoons and other items from her early career to the Cartoon Art Museum in San Francisco. This became the foundation of the museum's 2019 exhibition The Teen Age: Youth Culture in Comics, and the first public display of her cartoons.

== Personal life ==
Kane was born in South Bend, Indiana to Stuyvesant Smith, an engineer, and Eunice Young Smith, an artist. She had one brother Chadwick. She attended Bradley University in Peoria, Illinois and graduated from the University of Wisconsin in 1954 where she'd transferred in her junior year. She married artist Russell Koester in March 1955. They divorced in 1959 and she married artist and noted Hawaiian historian Herb Kāne. They had two children, Jason and Jennifer. The couple divorced in 1974.
