= Serializer.net =

Webcomic subscription service

- 2002 logo
- Owner: Joey Manley
- Editors: Tom Hart, Eric Millikin
- Website: Serializer.net (archived)
- Launched: October 1, 2002
- Current status: Discontinued

Serializer.net was a webcomic subscription service and artist collective published by Joey Manley and edited by Tom Hart and Eric Millikin that existed from 2002 to 2013. Designed to showcase artistic alternative webcomics using the unique nature of the medium, the works on Serializer.net were described by critics as "high art" and "avant-garde". The project became mostly inactive in 2007 and closed alongside Manley's other websites in 2013.

== Concept ==
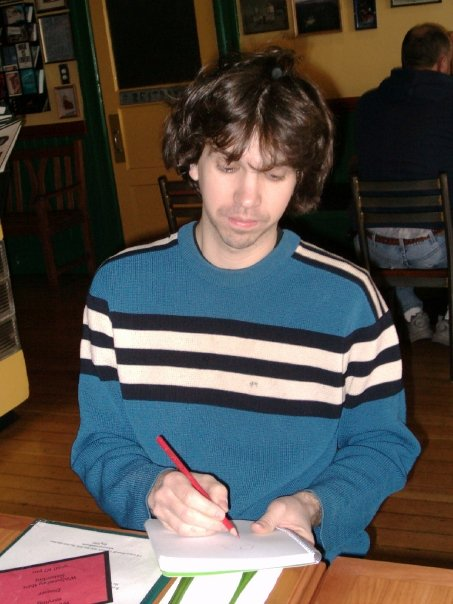
Tom Hart in 2003

Just prior to Serializer's launch in 2002, webcomics publisher Joey Manley described the site to Wired as a showcase for alternative webcomics "designed to provoke thought, to challenge assumptions and exercise the aesthetic sense." Manley stated that he wanted the artists on Serializer to "do everything and anything that the best novelists, the best filmmakers, the best poets and painters are able to do and, because of the unique nature of the form, to do some things that those artists, working in those other forms, can't do." When the site launched, the most recent webcomic pages and strips were free, and the website's archives were available for a subscription fee of $2.95 USD per month. This subscription model was revolutionary at the time, and was one of the first profitable subscription models for webcomics. A few webcomics on Serializer were also available for direct purchase via the BitPass micropayments system.

Some of Serializer's comics used award-winning infinite canvas techniques, using the potentially limitless space available on the web to create comics that would be impossible to fit on standard print comics pages. In 2004, Hart noted that Serializer.net excited him specifically as an online venture, and that he was not interested in whether any of the works on it would wind up in print.

== History ==
Joey Manley and Tom Hart launched Serializer.net on October 1, 2002. It was the first expansion of the Modern Tales family of webcomic subscription services. In 2003, The Detroit News reported Serializer.net was publishing work by 25 independent cartoonists. In 2004, several Serializer artists' comics were included in the "Modern Tales’ 2003 Yearbook, Tallscreen Edition,” a 130-page full-color printed book of comics originally from the Modern Tales family of websites.

Serializer.net went down due to a server crash in 2006, but relaunched later that year with a new roster of around twenty artists and with Eric Millikin, one of the website's original artists, as editor. Activity on Serializer mostly died down in 2007, as Manley was merging the Modern Tales family of websites into a new comics-oriented social media and publishing platform called ComicSpace. The collective Modern Tales family closed down in April 2013, and Manley died of pneumonia later that year.

== Webcomics ==
Serializer.net launched with a webcomic collaboration between Hart and Shaenon K. Garrity titled Trunktown, as well as The Salon by Nick Bertozzi, Half Empty by Derek Kirk, and the long-running Few and Far Between by Joda Thayer. Some other webcomics published by Serializer included:

- Matt Bors' Idiot Box
- Joey Comeau and Emily Horne's A Softer World
- Matt Feazell's Cynicalman, America's Laid-Off Superhero
- Renée French's Micrographica
- Eric Millikin's Fetus-X
- Ryan North's Dinosaur Comics
- Jen Sorensen's Slowpoke
- Spike Trotman's Templar, Arizona
- Drew Weing's Pup

== Reception ==
The Sunday Times described Serializer as "high-art," and The Sydney Morning Herald considered the webcomics on Serializer to be avant-garde. Publishers Weekly called Serializer.net artists such as Brian Sendelbach, Glenn Dakin, Greg Stump, and Nick Bertozzi as "art comics favorites."
