= Modern Tales =

Webcomic subscription service

- 2004 logo

- September 2005 screenshot
- Owner: Joey Manley
- Editors: Joey Manley, Shaenon Garrity
- Website: ModernTales.com (archived)
- Launched: March 2, 2002
- Current status: Discontinued

Modern Tales was a webcomics publisher active from 2002 to 2012, best known for being one of the first profitable subscription models for digital content. Joey Manley was the website's publisher and original editor. The site featured a roster of approximately 30 professional webcomic artists. Shaenon Garrity, one of the site's original artists, took over as the publication's editor in 2006. Other Modern Tales artists included Gene Luen Yang, James Kochalka, Dorothy Gambrell, Harvey Pekar and Will Eisner.

In the first four years of Modern Tales' run, its most recent webcomic pages and strips were free, and the site's archives were available by subscription. The website's archives eventually became free to read as well, as online advertisement rates improved. Modern Tales did solid business and Manley spun off a number of similar subscription services, including Serializer.net, Girlamatic, and Kochalka's American Elf, which together became known as the "Modern Tales family".

== Concept ==
Working in San Francisco for Streaming Media in the early 2000s, Joey Manley became interested in the possibilities for artists on the web. To introduce himself to the webcomic community, he started a podcast called Digital Comics Talk and a review website Talk About Comics. In 2001, Manley conceptualized a for-profit subscription-based webcomic collective where readers can pay a monthly or annual fee to get access to a library of webcomic archives. He hoped the subscription model would allow artists to work together to increase each other's visibility and profits. Manley began to recruit artists, many of whom he had met through his podcast. Shaenon Garrity described the webcomics showcased on Modern Tales as "ambitious, offbeat, and often visually experimental." The publication was named in the spirit of old pulp magazines, such as Amazing Stories and Weird Tales.

The most recent update of each webcomic on Modern Tales was freely available, and readers could pay US$2.95 per month or $29.95 per year to get access to the website's archive.

== History ==
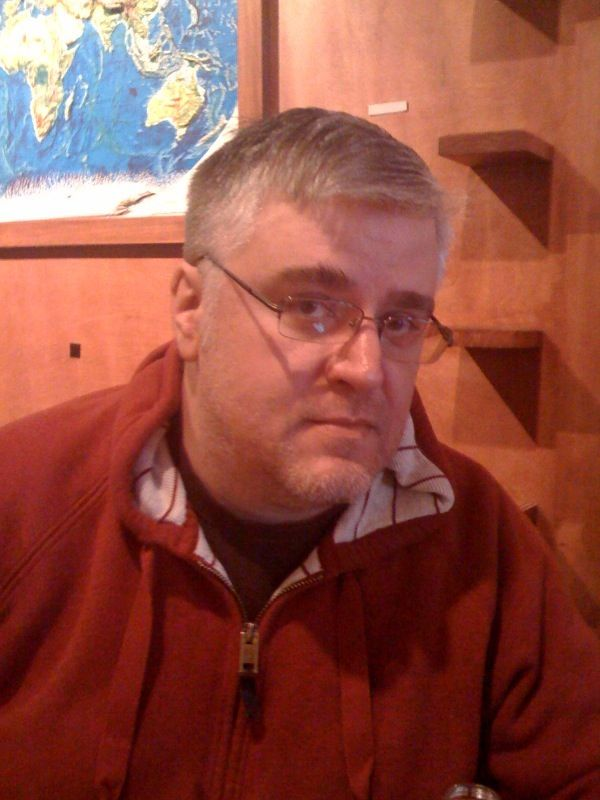
Manley in 2009

Modern Tales launched on March 2, 2002, with a roster of major emerging artists and cartoonists. Its launch line-up included Lark Pien, Jason Shiga, Jesse Hamm, Gene Luen Yang, James Kochalka, and Dorothy Gambrell. Established heavy hitters like Harvey Pekar and Will Eisner contributed later, but Modern Tales was generally a showcase for new artists. The website grew rapidly in its first week: while Manley predicted his website would accrue around 150 subscribers in its first year, Modern Tales actually earned over 700 subscribers in its first week. Manley attributed this to high cost of bandwidth and the relatively low number of high-quality webcomics available at the time. As time went on and the number of high-quality free webcomics increased, the subscriber count of Modern Tales went stagnant.

By August 2003, Modern Tales' back catalogue featured over 4,000 webcomic pages. The website ran a section, curated by Gary Chaloner, featuring 20 Australian cartoonists to aid them in connecting with a global audience. In 2004, Manley published the Modern Tales' "2003 Yearbook", titled Tallscreen Edition, through BookSurge. This is a 130-page full-color printed book featuring works from all of Joey Manley's webcomic subscription services.

In January 2006, Manley launched a secondary, advertisement-driven version of Modern Tales, edited by blogger and critic Eric Burns. Manley decided to establish this free version of Modern Tales in response to changes in economic circumstances that drive website models. In an interview with The Comics Reporter, Manley stated that "the Modern Tales brand isn't really sustainable in the current environment," and that he saw a need to append free webcomics to his subscription services. Narbonic-creator Shaenon Garrity took over as editor of Modern Tales in August 2006, and worked on reviving its long-form webcomic section and implementing the Project Wonderful advertisement system. As the subscription model became less and less popular, Manley eventually made the website entirely free.

=== Spin-off sites ===
Manley spun off several other websites based on Modern Tales' subscription model, including Serializer.net, Girlamatic, AdventureStrips.com and Graphic Smash. Each of these sites had a different editorial focus from that of Modern Tales, such as alternative comics and action comics. Manley also published two single-webcomic subscription sites under the Modern Tales umbrella: Kochalka's American Elf and Lea Hernandez' Rumble Girls. The entire group of subscription sites Manley published were known as the "Modern Tales family." Manley launched the free hosting provider Webcomics Nation in 2005 as he took note of the changing Web economy. Whereas Modern Tales and its family was constructed in the style of traditional editorial magazines, Webcomics Nation was set up more as a service-bureau business.

=== Closure ===
As Modern Tales declined in readership, it was shut down in 2012. The remaining family of subscription services closed down in April 2013, and Manley died in November 2013 of pneumonia.

== Success and impact ==
Manley's stated goal when he launched Modern Tales was for subscription revenue alone to provide a living wage for artists within five years, and the services did do solid business. Due to Modern Tales' revenue-sharing model, the most viewed webcomics like Garrity's Narbonic generated the most income and, in the best years, Garrity could have lived solely off her Modern Tales earnings had she lived somewhere less expensive than the San Francisco Bay Area. Six months after the site's launch, Donna Barr was "impressed" that she was regularly making US$100 per month from Modern Tales. Other Modern Tales artists made comparatively little; in 2005, Hernandez described her income from Modern Tales as "gas money", and Dave Roman said he typically made less than US$100 per year on the website. Before his comic was canceled, cartoonist Jason Shiga was able to make US$70 per strip when he was published in a weekly Bay Area newspaper, but he only made US$4 per strip on Modern Tales in 2003. Some artists on Manley's other sites, such as Kochalka with his American Elf, were able to make more money than the most profitable artists on the original Modern Tales site.

Manley said in July 2003 that Modern Tales was attracting between 10,000 and 15,000 individual visitors daily, and that 3,500 people had signed up for a subscription. In an interview with Alameda Times-Star, Manley said "We're not Disney, obviously, but we have proven that people will pay for Web comics." Throughout 2005 and 2006, Modern Tales had around 2,100 subscribers, which was the most of Manley's four subscription services. The entire Modern Tales family grossed around US$100,000 per year, though this had to be split among nearly 100 cartoonists as well as the Web hosting company. Modern Tales was cited by Comic Book Resources as one of the first workable and profitable subscription models for webcomics. The viability of Modern Tales inspired Marvel Comics and DC Comics to develop their own digital comic websites.

The Sunday Times of Britain criticized the website in 2006 for its unintuitive homepage and slow page loading.
