= Lea Hernandez =

American comics artist

- Born: March 11, 1964 (age 62)
- Areas: Artist, Letterer
- Notable works: Killer Princesses; Rumble Girls

Lea Hernandez (born March 11, 1964) is an American comic book and webcomic creator, known primarily for working in a manga-influenced style, and for doing lettering and touch-ups on manga imports. She is the co-creator of Killer Princesses, written by Gail Simone and published by Oni Press; and the creator of Rumble Girls from NBM Publishing.

== Career ==
She did art for comics published by Marvel Comics and DC Comics: Marvel Mangaverse: Punisher (a one-shot), and Transmetropolitan (two two-page shorts). She also did art for three issues of The Hardy Boys manga-style series at Papercutz.

Hernandez published several webcomics at Modern Tales and was the original editor of Girlamatic. In 2002, Hernandez created the short webcomic Near Life Experience for Modern Tales.

Hernandez has written several short stories for collections of science fiction and fantasy.

She was a vice president for General Products, USA (the U.S. marketing arm of Gainax) from 1989–1990 and was briefly a guest editor for Wizard.

Hernandez appeared in Adventures Into Digital Comics, a 2006 documentary on the comics industry. She did art on eight issues of the DC Comics title Teen Titans GO!

== Personal life ==
On the morning of September 6, 2006, her house in Texas burned down and much of her original artwork was lost in the fire. Colleagues in the comics industry responded by collecting donations for Hernandez from fans and friends in the comics industry. In 2014, she married former LA Times comics syndicate and Disney Comics editor David Seidman.

== Awards ==
Hernandez received a 1999 Eisner Award nomination for Talent Deserving of Wider Recognition. In 2004, she was awarded Lulu of the Year by Friends of Lulu, a now disbanded women in comics organization, for editing at Girlamatic.

== Bibliography ==
=== Short stories ===
- "800-DJIN-HLP" in Aladdin: Master of the Lamp. edited by Mike Resnick and Martin H. Greenberg, DAW books, 1992.
- "Al Einstein—Nazi Smasher!" in Alternate Warriors, edited by Mike Resnick, Tor Books, 1993.
- "Pteri" in Dinosaur Fantastic. edited by Mike Resnick and Martin H. Greenberg, DAW book, 1993.
- "The Ghost of Christmas Scams." in Christmas Ghosts. edited by Mike Resnick and Martin H. Greenberg, DAW Books, 1993.
- "The Journal of #3 Honeysuckle Lane" in Witch Fantastic. edited by Mike Resnick and Martin H. Greenberg, DAW Books, 1995.

=== Books ===
- Cathedral Child. Somerville, Maryland: Cyberosia Publishing, 1998.
- Clockwork Angels. Berkeley, California: Image, 2001
- Rumble Girls. New York: NBM Publishing, 2003.
- Manga Secrets. Cincinnati, Ohio: Impact, 2005.
