= 1995–1999 in webcomics =

Notable events of the late 1990s in webcomics.

== Background ==
As the World Wide Web was proliferating in the second half of the 1990s, various creators of webcomics (a term that was not yet popularized at the time) started to communicate with one another and link to each other's work. Cartoonist Reinder Dijkhuis (Rogues of Clwyd-Rhan) remembered that in mid-1995, there were hundreds of comics made available online; many of which were based on college newspaper comic strips and many were short-lived. From this point on, the World Wide Web gained attention from syndicated cartoonists such as Scott Adams (Dilbert) and cartoonists who saw the internet as a potential path to eventual syndication. Author T Campbell called 1996 the end of the "Stone Age" of webcomics, and cartoonist Shaenon Garrity described the period from 1996 to 2000 as "the Singularity" of webcomics as the medium "exploded" in popularity. Joe Zabel said of Charley Parker's 1995 webcomic Argon Zark! that "the web could hardly have picked a more outstanding premiere series," and celebrated the tenth anniversary of its release with a round table on the "artistic history of webcomics."

In France, interactive digital comics were spread on compact disks during this period, while the introduction of the internet in French homes spurred the creation of the first webcomic blogs.

In the United States, various major webcomic genres were established and popularized between 1995 and 1999. The video game webcomic came into being in 1995 with the release of Polymer City Chronicles and was popularized in the following years by PvP and Penny Arcade. The first sprite comic – Jay Resop's Neglected Mario Characters – was released in 1998, though the genre wouldn't be popularized until Bob and George came out in 2000. In Reinventing Comics (2000), Scott McCloud pointed out that some webcomic creators had been experimenting with the capabilities of the Web, such as through an interactive hypertext interface, GIF animations, and sound. The first major webcomic portal, Big Panda, started in 1997. Big Panda hosted over 770 webcomics, including Sluggy Freelance and User Friendly. Big Panda's discontinuation eventually resulted in the formation of Keenspot in 2000.

== List ==
Several notable webcomics that started in this period include:

=== 1995 ===
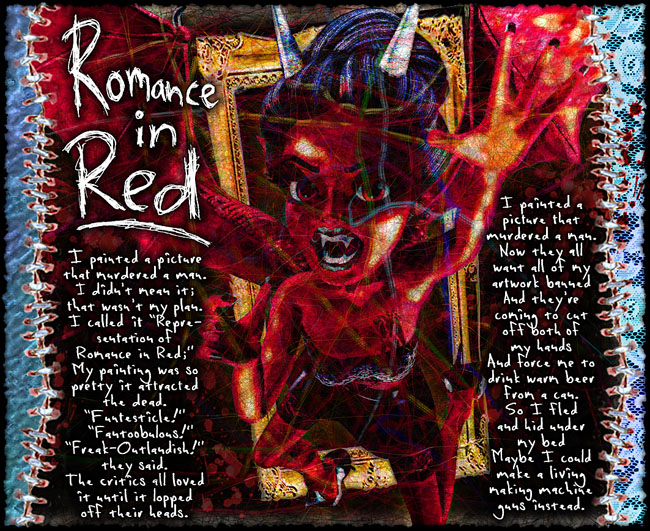
Eric Millikin

- March 2 – Art Comics Daily by Bebe Williams
- March 13 – Polymer City Chronicles by Chris Morrison (started its print run in 1992)
- June 27 – Argon Zark! by Charley Parker
- September 3 – Kevin and Kell by Bill Holbrook
- Fall – Eric Millikin (titled Fetus-X from 2000 to 2008) by Eric Millikin (formerly with Casey Sorrow)

=== 1996 ===
- January 1 – Bruno by Christopher Baldwin
- March 1 – Magic Inkwell by Cayetano Garza
- March 31 – Help Desk by C. B. Wright
- June 10 – Red Meat by Max Cannon
- June – Helen, Sweetheart of the Internet by Peter Zale
- September 15 - Sabrina Online by Eric W. Schwartz

=== 1997 ===
- April 1 – Goats by Jonathan Rosenberg
- August 25 – Sluggy Freelance by Pete Abrams
- September 10 – Roomies! by David Willis
- October 27 – Piled Higher and Deeper by Jorge Cham
- November 17 – User Friendly by J.D. "Illiad" Frazer
- Buzzer Beater by Takehiko Inoue
- Leisure Town by Tristan A. Farnon

=== 1998 ===
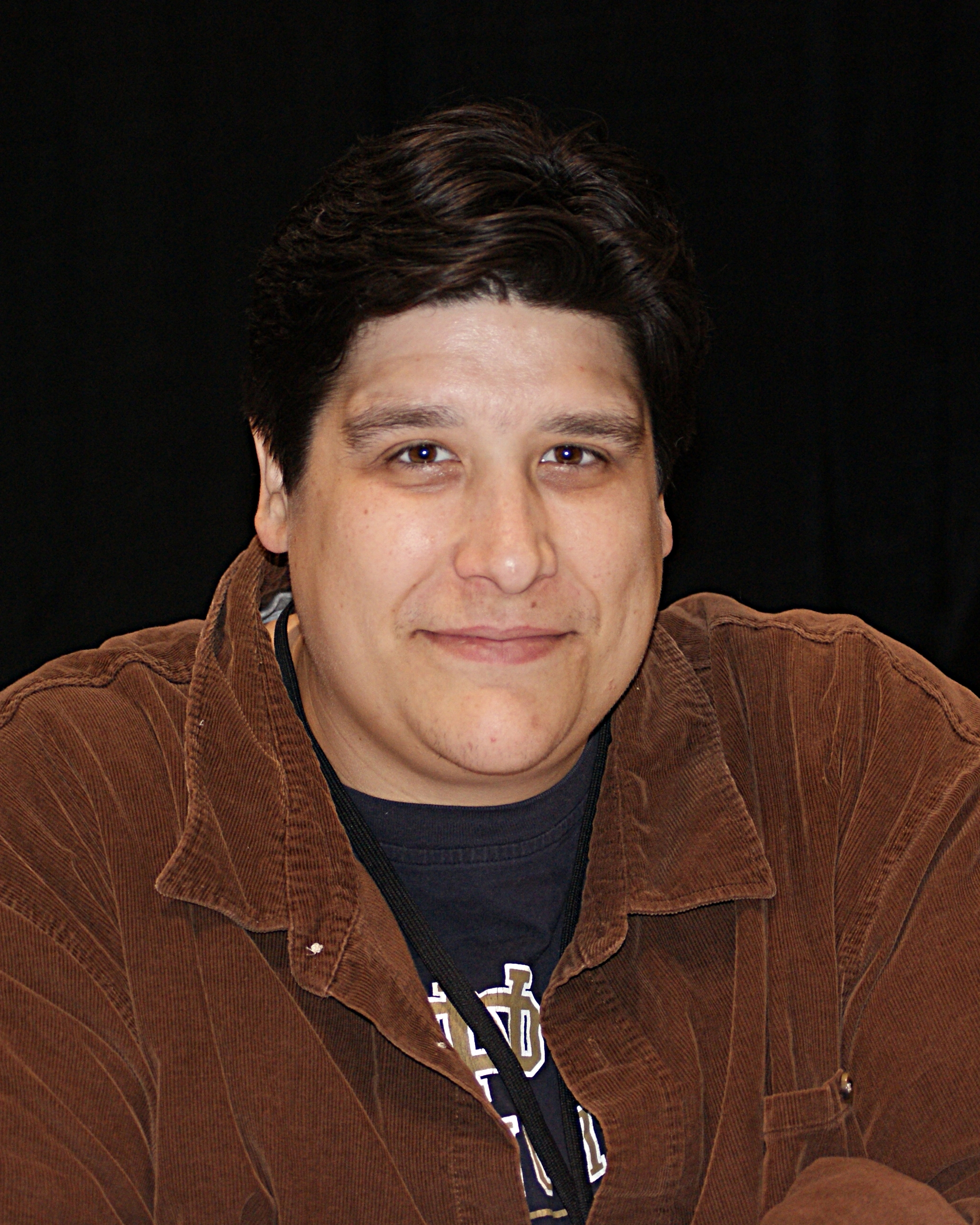
Scott Kurtz' PvP popularized the video game webcomic.

- January – Ozy and Millie by D. C. Simpson
- February 18 – Pokey the Penguin by Steve Havelka
- March 25 – Jane's World by Paige Braddock
- May 4 – PVP by Scott Kurtz
- September 21 – Bobbins by John Allison
- October 21 – The PC Weenies by Krishna M. Sadasivam
- November 18 – Penny Arcade by Mike Krahulik and Jerry Holkins
- Astounding Space Thrills by Steve Conley
- Boy on a Stick and Slither by Steven L. Cloud
- Combo Rangers by Fábio Yabu
- General Protection Fault by Jeffrey T. Darlington

=== 1999 ===
- March 1 – Superosity by Chris Crosby
- June 14 – Cat and Girl by Dorothy Gambrell
- June 21 – Sheldon by Dave Kellett
- November 8 – Avalon by Josh Phillips
- November 15 – Real Life by Maelyn Dean
- December 25 – It's Walky! by David Willis
