= List of early webcomics =

Webcomics from 1985 to 1994

Webcomics predate the World Wide Web and the commercialization of the internet by a few years, with the first webcomic being published through CompuServe in 1985. Though webcomics require a larger online community to gain widespread popularity through word-of-mouth, various webcomics pioneered the style of self-publishing in the late 1980s and early 1990s.

== Webcomics of the 1980s ==
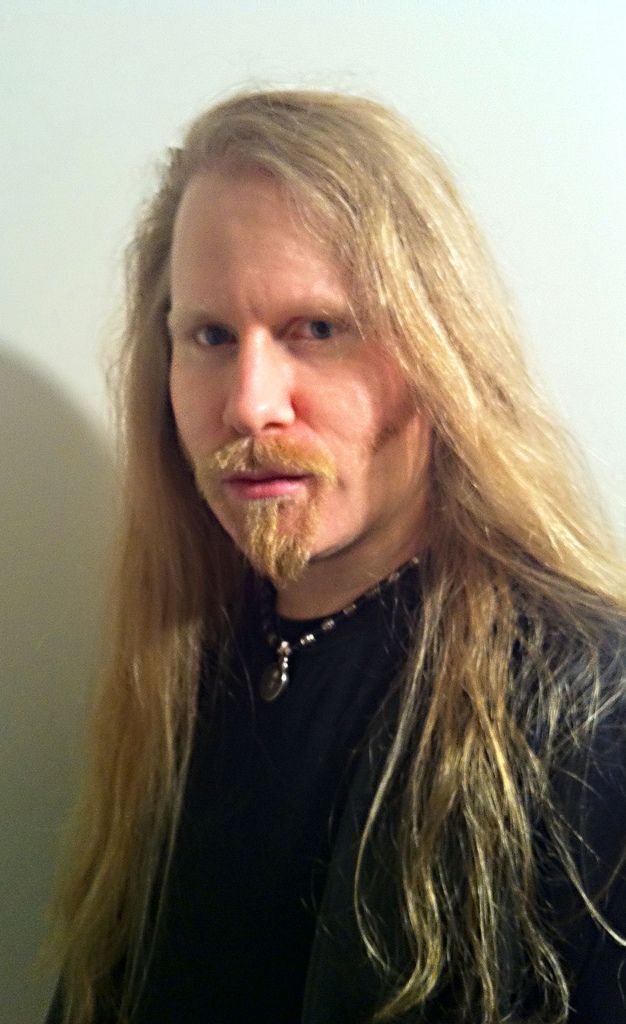
Eric Millikin created the first known webcomic.

The earliest known online comic was Eric Millikin's Witches and Stitches, which he started uploading on CompuServe in 1985. By self-publishing on the internet, Millikin was able to share his work without having to worry over censorship and demographics. Witches and Stitches quickly rose to popularity, inspiring other artists to upload their works as well.

Joe Ekaitis' T.H.E. Fox was a furry webcomic that started in 1986. Initially published on CompuServe, Ekaitis moved on to Q-Link and GEnie as the internet grew. Early strips consisted of one panel each and were drawn as pixel art on a Commodore 64 KoalaPad, first using KoalaPainter, then Advanced OCP Art Studio. T.H.E. Fox was eventually renamed Thadeus and started featuring regularly drawn strips, before Ekaitis stopped updating the comic in 1998.

== Webcomics of the early 1990s ==
In the early 1990s, cartoonists produced comics through various Internet protocols. During this period, it was unclear which systems would turn out to be the most successful. Hans Bjordahl, student at the University of Colorado at the time, started posting Where the Buffalo Roam on April 15, 1992 on Usenet, in GIF and PostScript format. Sharing the comic through the Internet, its readership extended through a few states. Even in 1995, cartoonist Dominic White published his comics The Internet Explorer Kit for the Macintosh and Slugs through Gopher rather than the World Wide Web, despite the latter rapidly gaining popularity.

The first strip of Stafford Huyler's NetBoy was uploaded on the World Wide Web in July 1993. Being described as an early example of nerd humor, the stick figure comic made frequent references to technical topics most people with an Internet connection at the time would have knowledge of. Huyler later started the spin-off comic U.Nox, about system administrator Uri Noxen. Despite the small size of Huyler's early NetBoy comics (10 kilobytes), the server it was hosted on would crash when the strip got over six visits per second. In response to the webcomic's increasing popularity, Huyler built a stronger server himself. Despite these limitations, Huyler was one of the pioneers of the concept of infinite canvas, uploading strips in shapes and sizes other than those used in standard printed comics.

The first strip of David Farley's Doctor Fun was uploaded on September 23, 1993. Campbell described Doctor Fun as the "first regular web comic", as NetBoy did not have a regular schedule during its first year. Mike Wean's Jax & Co. was first uploaded in 1994. Using JavaScript, it was the first webcomic to implement a "page turning" interface that encourages readers to read the comic in order. Soon, this effect was recreated by simple HTML, such as with Argon Zark!, which launched in June 1995 and is occasionally listed among the earliest comics to be published on the World Wide Web.

Mid-1994, the Finnish Comics Society launched a collection of webcomics by various authors, initially under the label "NetComics". In November 1994, Reinder Dijkhuis started publishing the Rogues of Clwyd-Rhan on the World Wide Web in Dutch, previously a small-press comic entitled De Rovers van Clwyd-Rhan. The two of these were the first known webcomic created outside of the United States. The same year, an artist going by the name Eerie created a webcomic on bulletin board systems using ANSI art, titled Inspector Dangerfuck.

Webcomics popular on the internet in January 1995 included NetBoy, Aaron A. Aardvark, and The Afterlife of Bob. At this point, fans of traditional comics such as Calvin and Hobbes started sharing such copyrighted comic strips on the internet. By the end of 1995, there existed hundreds of webcomics, most of which were derived from college newspaper comics, and most were short-lived.

=== Other firsts ===
In March 1995, artist Bebe Williams launched one of the first webcomics collectives, Art Comics Daily. Newspaper comic strips and their syndicates also launched websites in the mid-1990s. Other webcomic collectives, like Big Panda, started in the second half of the 1990s. Big Panda hosted over 770 webcomics, including Sluggy Freelance and User Friendly, which started in 1997. Big Panda's discontinuation resulted in the formation of Keenspot in 2000. In 1995, Dilbert became the first syndicated comic strip to be officially published through the Internet.

Though the genre was popularized by PvP, the first video game webcomic was Chris Morisson's Polymer City Chronicles, which started being published on the World Wide Web in 1995. Three years later, in 1998, Jay Resop started the first sprite comic, Neglected Mario Characters.

== Timeline ==
Excluding traditional comic strips such as Calvin and Hobbes that were uploaded illegally, this is a timeline of cartoons that are known to have been posted on the Internet before 1995:

Title	Creator	Date	Service	Sources
Witches and Stitches	Eric Millikin	1985	CompuServe	
T.H.E. Fox	Joe Ekaitis	1986	CompuServe	
Where the Buffalo Roam	Hans Bjordahl	1991	Usenet	
Doctor Fun	David Farley	September 1993	World Wide Web	
NetBoy	Stafford Huyler	May 1994	World Wide Web	
VerkkoSarja (NetComics)	Finnish Comics Society	June 1994	World Wide Web	
Inspector Dangerfuck	Eerie	September 1994	Bulletin board systems	
The Afterlife of Bob	David Woloschuk	October 1994	World Wide Web	
CultuRe Trap	Christian Cosas	October 1994	World Wide Web	
Kaleidospace collaborative art project	P. Craig Russell	October 1994	World Wide Web	
Rogues of Clwyd-Rhan	Reinder Dijkhuis	November 1994	World Wide Web	
Stocious	Tomas Christensen	November 1994	World Wide Web	
Virtually Reality	Eric Scroger	November 1994	World Wide Web	
Aaron A. Aardvark		1994	World Wide Web	
Captain Jim	Dan Sandler	1994	World Wide Web	
Dysfunctional Family Circus	Various	1994	World Wide Web	
Jax & Co	Mike Wean	1994	World Wide Web	

== See also ==
- 1995–99 in webcomics
- History of webcomics
