= History of webcomics =

The history of webcomics follows the advances of technology, art, and business of comics on the Internet. The first comics were shared through the Internet in the mid-1980s. Some early webcomics were derivatives from print comics, but when the World Wide Web became widely popular in the mid-1990s, more people started creating comics exclusively for this medium. By the year 2000, various webcomic creators were financially successful and webcomics became more artistically recognized.

In the second half of the 2000s, webcomics became less financially sustainable due to the rise of social media and consumers' disinterest in certain kinds of merchandise. However, crowdsourcing through Kickstarter and Patreon also became popular in this period, allowing readers to donate money to webcomic creators directly. The 2010s also saw the rise of webtoons in South Korea, where the form has become very prominent.

== Early history (1985–1995) ==
The earliest comic distributed on the Internet is Eric Millikin's Witches and Stitches, which he started uploading on CompuServe in 1985. By self-publishing on the Internet, Millikin was able to share his work while avoiding censorship by publishers or having to appeal to mainstream demographics. By 1986, other comics were published on CompuServe, including Joe Ekaitis' T.H.E. Fox, a furry webcomic drawn on the Commodore 64.

From the 1980s to the early 1990s, artists published using many different Internet protocols as it was yet unclear which if any would become most widely used. For example, Usenet was home to Hans Bjohrdal's Where the Buffalo Roam in 1992. With this technology, Bjohrdal reached an audience at college campuses across a few U.S. states. Tim Berners-Lee's World Wide Web rose in popularity in 1993; usage of the World Wide Web grew by 341,634% in 1993, and competitor protocol Gopher's growth of 997% paled in comparison. Web browser Mosaic, which saw its beta release in 1993, allowed the recent introductions of GIF and JPEG image formats to be shown directly on web pages. Before this point, images shared through the internet had to be downloaded to the user's hard drive directly in order to be viewed.

In 1994 and 1995, webcomics such as Jax & Co., NetBoy, and Argon Zark! experimented with forms possible only on the Internet, uploading strips in shapes and sizes impossible in print. Mike Wean's Jax & Co. introduced a "page turning" interface that encourages readers to read the panels in order; a concept that was quickly recreated by other webcomic artists. Also in 1994, an artist known as Eerie posted an ANSI art comic on bulletin board systems.

Reinder Dijkhuis recalled that, by the end of 1995, there were hundreds of comics being shared through the Internet. Most of these were derived from strips of college newspapers and most were short-lived on the Internet. In 1995, when Dilbert became the first syndicated comic strip to be published on the Internet, "[lending] a certain legitimacy to the online comic concept," it became clear the Internet could be an effective tool to reach large audiences.

== The second decade (1995–2005) ==
In 2000, Scott McCloud released Reinventing Comics, a book in which he argued that the future of comics was on the Internet. McCloud stated that the World Wide Web allowed comics to make use of the various advantages of digital media, establishing the idea of infinite canvas. By 2008, it was clear that McCloud's predictions of infinite canvas did not materialize entirely, but creators such as Cayetano Garza and Demian5 were influenced by his ideas.

In 1997, Bryan McNett started a webcomic hosting provider, calling it Big Panda. Over 770 webcomics were hosted on Big Panda, including Sluggy Freelance, making it the first major webcomic portal. Due to a lack of interest, McNett shut Big Panda down in 2000. Chris Crosby, who ran his webcomic Superiosity on Big Panda at the time, contacted McNett in order to create a new webcomics portal, which resulted in Keenspot. This new portal became a major success.

In 2002, Joey Manley started webcomic portal Modern Tales as a competitor to Keenspot, which became one of the first profitable subscription models for webcomics. According to T Campbell, webcomics seemed unsustainable at the time, with advertisement rates dropping to an all-time low. Manley's Modern Tales was a popular solution at the time, and Manley spun off websites such as Girlamatic and Webcomics Nation. Modern Tales had 2,000 members by 2005, each paying US$3 per month. In the same year, Keenspot drew in around 125,000 readers per day, grossing over US$200,000 per year through advertising. Established comic artists such as Carla Speed McNeil and Lea Hernandez found themselves moving towards the Internet in order to reach larger audiences and build "online portfolios".

With the proliferation of webcomics, awards began to emerge. In 2000, the Eagle Awards introduced the "Favourite Web-based Comic" category, and 2001 saw the first installment of the Web Cartoonists' Choice Awards. The Ignatz Awards also added a "Best Online Comic" accolade in 2001, but the event was canceled that year due to the September 11 attacks and the title was first awarded in 2002. The Eisner Awards, the most prestigious comics ceremony, eventually introduced a "Best Digital Comic" category in 2005.

=== Video game webcomics ===
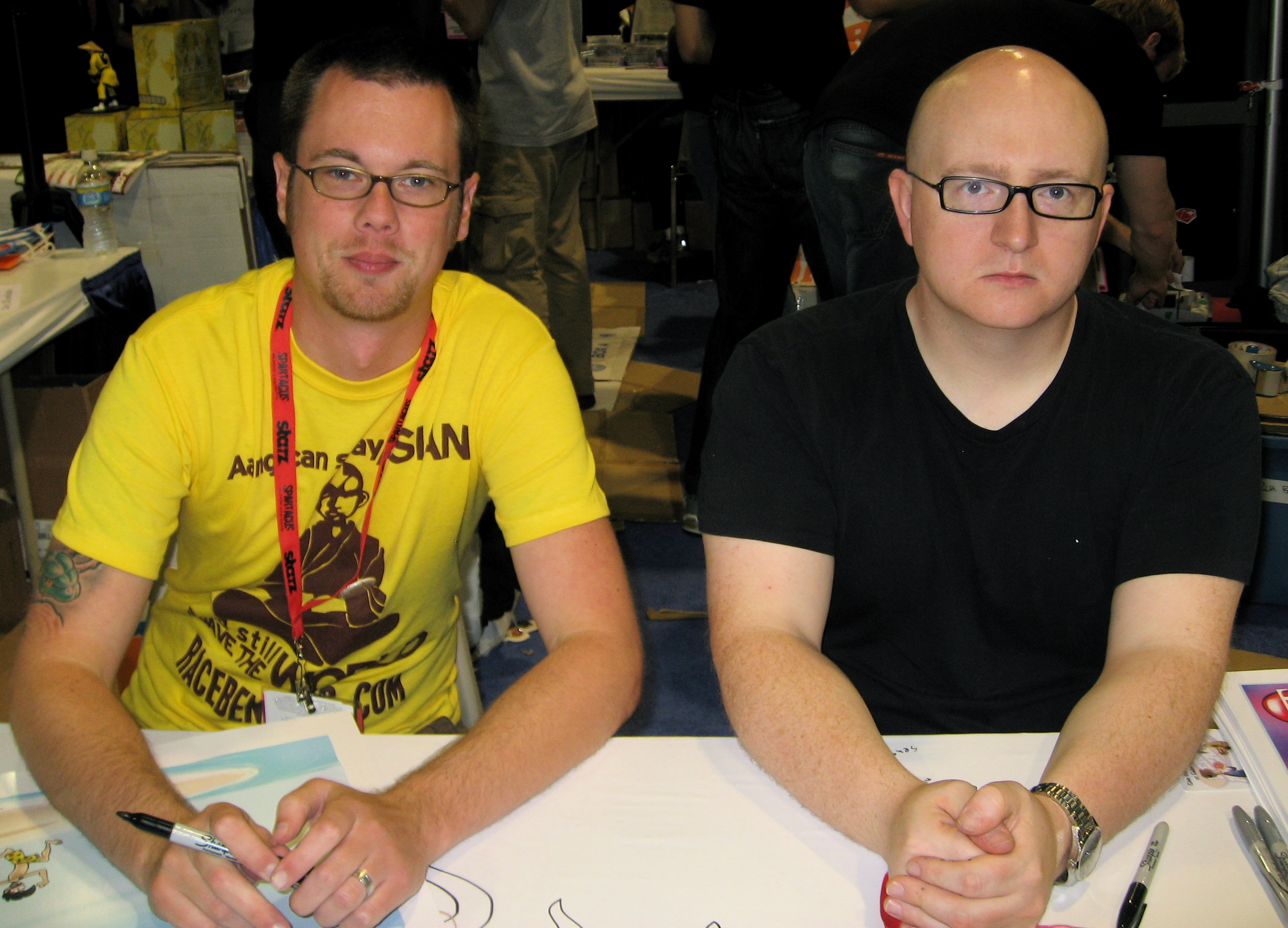
Creators of Penny Arcade Mike Krahulik and Jerry Holkins

The second half of the 1990s saw the introduction of video game webcomics as a genre. Chris Morrison posted the first known video game webcomic, titled Polymer City Chronicles, in 1995. Others followed towards the end of the decade, including Scott Kurtz's PvP in May 1998, and Jay Resop's sprite comic Neglected Mario Characters in September 1998. In November 1998, the duo of Jerry Holkins and Mike Krahulik started Penny Arcade, a comic Nich Maragos from 1UP.com described as the "most popular, the most lucrative, and the most influential" video game webcomics, and by Mike Meginnis as "one of the most commonly emulated comics out there."

Penny Arcade also proved to be a huge player in fields outside of webcomics in the early 2000s. In 2003, Holkins and Krahulik founded Child's Play, a charity that managed to raise over US$100,000 in its first year, which it used for donating toys for the Seattle Children's Hospital. The charity has become more successful since and now donates toys to hospitals across the country. In 2004, the duo started the Penny Arcade Expo (PAX), a yearly video game convention that debuted with an estimated 3,000 guests and has grown in size since.

David Anez' Bob and George, which launched in April 2000, was the first sprite comic to reach a larger level of popularity. However, it would not be until the release of Brian Clevinger's 8-Bit Theater that the genre really took off. Maragos of 1-UP.com stated that 8-Bit Theater "took the style to its fullest expression and greatest popularity." Larry Cruz of Comic Book Resources pointed out that, though sprite comics are still an overwhelmingly popular style, "no other sprite comic [has] really achieve[d] the same amount of popularity" since 8-Bit Theater's discontinuation in 2010.

=== Recent history (2005–present) ===
Brady Dale from The New York Observer noted in 2015 that people in the American webcomics industry had been shifting their business practices. While during the early 2000s, webcomics were mainly reliant on merchandise such as T-shirts for monetization, but this practice became less profitable in the 2010s. Dorothy Gambrell, creator of Cat and Girl, explained that the practice went well until "the great T-shirt crash of 2008." Webcomic merchandise distributor Topatoco started looking to provide more products than only T-shirts around 2010, while Ryan North's "Project Wonderful" aimed to improve webcomic-based advertisement.

In 2007, DC Comics launched Zuda Comics, a webcomics imprint devoted to original, creator-developed stories. The site invited cartoonists to submit short comics for monthly competitions, in which registered readers voted for the titles they wanted to see continued. Winning creators received contracts to produce additional installments, while DC also commissioned selected projects directly. Launched on October 30, 2007, Zuda combined webcomic publication with community participation and a route to print editions. Notable series included Jeremy Love's Bayou, which received multiple Glyph Comics Awards, and High Moon by David Gallaher and Steve Ellis, which won the 2009 Harvey Award for Best Online Comics Work. Zuda discontinued its monthly competitions in April 2010 and closed its website that July, with selected series moving to DC's broader digital distribution services, including ComiXology.

Though the 2008 financial crisis had only a minor impact on the webcomic industry, many webcomic artists have been looking for alternative employment in the 2010s. While Topatoco has been seeking work with video game developers, podcasters and other internet personalities, some creators moved on to other media entirely. Toothpaste for Dinner-creator Drew Fairweather, for instance, started focusing his energy on his blog and his career as a rapper in 2011, while the creators of Amazing Super Powers moved on to developing video games.

My business is not a business in the sense of being a small and medium sized enterprise or even particularly entrepreneurial ... I make comics because I like the activity of writing and drawing. It is a self-sustaining, one-man enterprise.

— Scary Go Round-creator John Allison

With the rise of social media in the second half of the 2000s, webcomic artists began having a more difficult time gaining attention and views. Wondermark-creator David Malki believes traffic to webcomic websites plateaued in 2012, as visiting content-specific websites generally disappeared from people's daily routines. Sharing of comic strips on social media such as Facebook has led to more exposure of webcomics, causing some to show signs of growth, but few people access webcomic websites directly.

In 2015, Gambrell stated that "webcomics are dead," as the period of webcomics only being posted for free on the internet was over and the industry had moved beyond the internet. Though many successful webcomic creators in the 2010s do not envision their online craft as their "job", most do not have to worry about basic money issues. However, Sarah Dorchak of Gauntlet proposed in 2011 that the free nature of webcomics may be a leading factor in the decline of economic viability of traditional comic books.

=== Crowdsourcing ===
Patreon marked a turning point for the webcomic industry.

In 2004, R.K. Milholland's started a crowdsourcing project to stabilize the update schedule of his webcomic Something Positive. After fans donated enough money for Milholland to quit his job and focus exclusively on Something Positive, other webcomic creators followed his example. Zach Weinersmith of Saturday Morning Breakfast Cereal turned to Kickstarter to fund his related project Single Use Monocles, and Andrew Hussie's Hiveswap raised over US$700,000 in 2012, becoming the most successful webcomic-related Kickstarter project of all time. Creators of smaller webcomics such as Cucumber Quest and The Antler Boy frequently raise over US$50,000 on Kickstarter in order to publish their material in print.

Another large shift in the webcomic industry came with the 2013 introduction of Patreon, through which people can donate money directly to content creators. Weinersmith, North, Allison, and Dave McElfatrick have all pointed at the service as a turning point for the webcomic industry that allowed many artist to produce online comics full-time.

=== Asian webcomics ===
The early 2010s saw the global increase in popularity of South Korean webtoons. Supported by high-speed Internet and large-scale mobile phone usage in South Korea, webtoons achieved a high demand. Webtoons have been adapted into TV dramas, films, online games and musicals, making it a multimillion-dollar market. Tapastic, a comics portal that accepts English-translated webtoons as webcomics from other cultures, was founded in 2012. Naver Corporation, South Korea's largest inventory of webtoons, began offering them in English in 2014.

Around the same period, Indian webcomics and Chinese webcomics also saw a large increase in popularity. There, webcomics are often used as a vehicle for social or political reform.

== See also ==
- History of the Internet
- History of comics
