= Doctor Fun =

Early webcomic by Dave Farley

- First logo
- Author(s): David Farley
- Website: ibiblio.org:80/Dave/drfun.html (archived)
- Current status/schedule: Concluded
- Launch date: September 24, 1993
- End date: June 9, 2006
- Syndicate(s): United Media (1995–ca. 2003)
- Genre(s): Comedy (funny animal comic)

Doctor Fun is a single-panel, gag webcomic by David Farley. It began in September 1993, making it one of the earliest webcomics, and ran until June 2006. Doctor Fun was part of United Media's website from 1995, but had parted ways by 2003. The comic was one of the longest-running webcomics before it concluded, having run for nearly thirteen years with over 2,600 strips. The webcomic has been compared to The Far Side.

== History ==
Doctor Fun began on September 24, 1993, and has been called "first comic published on the Web". It was not the first comic series published through the Internet – Witches and Stitches was distributed through CompuServe in 1985, and Where the Buffalo Roam was distributed through Usenet in 1991 – but it published through the World Wide Web, meaning it appeared on its own webpage rather than being sent out just by mailing lists or other earlier Internet technology. Its creator, Dave Farley, started uploading Doctor Fun while working as a computer technician for the library system at the University of Chicago.

In 1995, David Farley was signed by newspaper comic strip syndication service United Media; under the deal, Doctor Fun appeared on United Media's website. By 2003, Farley's contract with United Media had "fallen through." A book collection was published by Plan Nine Publishing in 2004.

In 2003, Farley said to The News & Observer that Doctor Fun was the longest-running webcomic. (This is no longer the case, with longer-running comics such as Kevin and Kell and Sluggy Freelance.) Farley said in 2005 that he hoped to keep doing Doctor Fun for at least ten years in total, or 520 weeks. On June 9, 2006, after posting the final page of his 520th week of strips, he announced that his series was concluded. According to a mirror archive, the comic ran every weekday with some weeks off through the years, for nearly thirteen years. Farley produced over 2,600 Doctor Fun strips during its run.

Doctor Fun was hosted on the digital library and archive project Ibiblio. The Ibiblio page is no longer live on the Internet, but archives exist.

== Content ==
Each Doctor Fun comic is a single-panel gag. Subjects include science, pop culture, and "outright weirdness". Farley said in 1994 that he drew the comics "in batches" and that it took about an evening to finish each color cartoon. He drew the comics on paper and scanned them.

== Reception ==
A writer for the National Center for Supercomputing Applications said in the comic's first month that the creation of the strip was "a major breakthrough for the Web".

A columnist for the Houston Chronicle discussed Doctor Fun in 1994 in an article on webcomics, or "net.toons" as they called them. The columnist called Doctor Fun "a Far Side clone", describing it as a "one-panel, full-color net.toon with a decidedly twisted outlook" and saying, "Farley's appeal is universal". A brief article in The Daily Telegraph in 2000 recommended Doctor Fun.

Farley said in 2003 that Doctor Fun received close to 50,000 hits per day.
