= Little Dee =

- Author(s): Christopher Baldwin
- Website: www.littledee.net
- Current status/schedule: Concluded daily webcomic
- Launch date: June 7, 2004
- End date: June 7, 2010
- Syndicate(s): Comics.com (2006–c. 2007)
- Publisher(s): Good Port Publishing
- Genre(s): Humor

Little Dee is a webcomic by Christopher Baldwin about a little girl lost in the woods who is befriended by three animals. The animals talk; Dee doesn't.

== Publication history ==
Begun on June 7, 2004, Little Dee is the last of several strips completed by Baldwin in hopes of syndication. His popular and long-running strip Bruno was never intended to be syndicated, but Baldwin turned to creating more family-friendly and accessible comics.

On May 30, 2006, Little Dee began appearing on Comics.com, beginning with two weeks of "reruns" to initiate new readers. (Comics.com was a service of United Media.) On his website on June 13, 2006, Chris Baldwin stated that the deal is a developmental deal, for "a year, give or take, possibly leaning towards syndication depending on how things go." As of August 8 (possibly earlier) the strip was no longer available on Comics.com.

Each strip was accompanied by a "Buy This Artwork!" link. The art is offered for sale in its original form, without its final shading, usually in two rows (which were combined into one on the web version), 7.75"x10.75" on vellum 100 lb (45 kg) Bristol paper sized 9" x 12". Once purchased, the name of the buyer replaced the "Buy" link, accompanied by the date and time of purchase.

Little Dee's final strip appeared on Tuesday April 6, 2010. To mark the occasion Baldwin offered a limited edition print of the characters for sale, incorporating a customized sketch and signature for each customer. The edition quickly sold out.

In late May 2010 Baldwin announced that the strip would begin a complete re-run on its original site, "larger and with more annotations", commencing June 7, 2010, the strip's sixth anniversary.

== Characters and general plot ==
The strip starts with Dee lost in the woods. Lonely, she hugs the first thing she can find, a bear called Ted. Ted can't find it in his heart to eat such a cute girl, so he adopts her, much to the chagrin of his friend Vachel, a vulture. Blake, a domesticated dog who has become feral, convinces the others that they should look for Dee's parents, which they do periodically. The four live together in a cave inexplicably equipped with furniture, running water, and electricity.

Dee's real name is not known; it is the name Ted has given her. Some of their time is spent searching for Dee's parents; much of the rest is spent in the cave or on other adventures.

- Dee is an archetypal child: young, cute, innocent, and fearless. She represents all that is simple and cheerfully adventurous. She does not speak, which adds to her childlikeness and seeming naïveté, yet she often is the boldest of all the characters.
- Ted is sensible, a parent, a mediator. Dee is most often seen hugging him. He is fiercely protective of her. The only thing that rattles Ted is Dee's misadventures. Ted is very fond of chocolate.
- Blake is the link for the other animals to the human world as he is domesticated, yet now lives in the woods. He is good-natured and somewhat naive and gullible — not the brightest of the characters. He considers the group his "pack" and Ted the "alpha."
- Vachel is the cynic and the curmudgeon of the group. He is the most likely to make snide remarks or see the dark side of things. Initially the least affectionate toward Dee, he was eventually won over. Atypically, one of his hobbies is knitting. He occasionally recounts events in his earlier life, such as when he lived with several other animals in a library and when he was part of a monastery of roller-skating monks.
- Kendra is a young rabbit who approaches most subjects with an intense enthusiasm that the main characters find less than endearing. She and Dee are sometimes playmates.
- Pudú is a pudú, who lives in Chile and is constantly visiting Dee and her friends in the United States. Pudú has an easygoing, naïve personality. He is also highly energetic (as if hyped up by caffeine), and is quite a pushover. Series concerning Pudú's visits usually result in him offering to go home and fetch something to help with the current situation, only to return three to six months later and find that the object he has fetched now has nothing to do with what's currently happening.
- The Alligator is an alligator who has a very strong crush on Blake and seems totally unaware that Blake does not love him in return. Ted often kicks him out of the cave when he visits Blake (due to his fear that he will eat one of his friends), so he has taken to visiting in secret, despite the fact that Blake is agitated by this.
- Alida is an elephant who has a crush on Vachel. In contrast to Blake's relationship with the Alligator, Vachel somewhat returns Alida's affection.
- A couple of fish appear from time to time, usually chattering away while one of the main characters is about to drown. They eventually end up saving whoever is in trouble at the last possible second, by such methods as "poking him in the bum with a pin".
- The Terranauts are a pair of fish (possibly the same ones) who spend some time exploring dry land and its inhabitants. They wear diving suits full of water, walk on their tail flukes and use their front fins like arms. The suits are supplied with fresh water by hoses from somewhere underwater.

== Books ==
Cartoon compilations published to date

- Little Dee (Volume 1) ISBN 978-0-9765483-2-4
- Little Dee (Volume 2) ISBN 978-0-9765483-4-8
- Little Dee (Volume 3) ISBN 978-0-9765483-5-5
- Little Dee (Volume 4) ISBN 978-0-9765483-6-2

== Reception ==
The Washington Post termed Little Dee "charming," while others called it "innocent and funny" and "age appropriate".
