= Where the Buffalo Roam (disambiguation) =

Where the Buffalo Roam is a 1980 American comedy film which loosely portrays author Hunter S. Thompson.

Where the Buffalo Roam may also refer to:

- Where the Buffalo Roam (1938 film)
- Where the Buffalo Roam (webcomic)
- Where the Buffalo Roam, a nonfiction book by Anne Matthews
- "Where the Buffalo Roam", an episode of the 1960s anthology TV series The Wednesday Play
- "Where the Buffalo Roam", a 1990 episode of the TV drama Neon Rider
- "Where the Buffalo Roam", a 2013 webisode of the documentary series Wild Kingdom
- "Where the Buffalo Roam", a 2022 episode of the animated sitcom Close Enough

== See also ==
- "Home on the Range", the song that popularized this phrase
- "Where the Buggalo Roam", an episode of the animated TV series Futurama
