= Rapid T. Rabbit and Friends =

- Genre: Comedy
- Created by: Richard Concepcion; William Hohauser
- Opening theme: "Custer's Last Stand" by Apollo 100
- Country of origin: United States
- Original language: English
- No. of episodes: 780

Production
- Camera setup: Single-camera (individual episodes); Multi-camera (studio interview episodes)
- Running time: 28 minutes

Original release
- Release: February 21, 1983 – April 28, 2017

Rapid T. Rabbit and Friends is an independently produced puppet and variety show created and produced by Richard J. Concepcion (September 16, 1957 – August 1, 2017) and William Hohauser. The show was broadcast weekly on public-access cable TV in New York City from 1983 to 2017. The show ran on the Manhattan Neighborhood Network, Queens Public TV, and aired online every Sunday afternoon over the Pawpet Broadcasting Network before the Funday Pawpet Show.

The show, which is based in Rapid Transit Rabbit's hometown of New York City, followed him, and his friends Cuppy, Rupert and Mejeep, both in town, and around the country on their adventures. This could be in the form of puppets interacting with each other via a traditional puppet stage, or in the form of a video documentary.

Throughout the years, the Rapid T. Rabbit character has attended many events such as the Doo-Dah Parade in Ocean City, New Jersey, and the Long Island Ducks Mascot Day among others, including the New York City Easter Parade. While Rapid T. Rabbit was a very involved with local events in the New York City area, he was commonly mistaken as the "Easter Bunny" by kids according to an interview with Concepcion in The New York Times.

Rapid also made appearances on various other television shows including The Daily Show with Jon Stewart in 1999 and with local fandoms including the Chuck E. Cheese and ShowBiz Pizza fandom (from 2004 until 2013) at "Cheesevention", as well as in the furry fandom at conventions such as Anthrocon and Midwest Furfest as a Guest of Honor in 2000.

In 2011, the program was the subject of a featured exhibition at the Museum of the Moving Image.

== Production ==
=== Background ===
Concepcion was born in Upper Manhattan in New York City, to a family that had emigrated from the Philippines. In the mid-to-late 1960s, he watched Jim Henson and the Muppets on The Ed Sullivan Show. In 1973, he wrote a letter to the Sesame Street character Big Bird, which earned him an invitation to the series' filming at Reeves Teletape Studios by puppeteer Caroll Spinney. He attended Hunter College of the City University of New York, where he worked as a technical aid in the college's television classroom studio during his senior years. During college, Concepcion interned in Manhattan Cable TV's (now Time Warner Cable) programming department. He graduated with honors, earning a Bachelor of Arts degree in Mass Media. Following his graduation, he began working as a master control room operator at Manhattan Cable. Concepcion was fascinated by the rise of public-access television, and volunteered as a camera operator at ETC Studios (later Metro-Access Studios).

=== Production of Rapid T. Rabbit ===
In 1983, Concepcion started developing his own public-access television program, choosing to use puppetry for the show as he did not have graphic arts training for animation. He cited Looney Tunes, Hanna-Barbera, The Banana Splits, the Muppets, and his invitation to Sesame Street as his influences for the show. Concepcion chose a rabbit character as the host of the show, inspired by his favorite cartoon rabbit characters, including Bugs Bunny, and purchased a floppy-eared rabbit puppet from a magic shop in Midtown Manhattan to use for the show. He named the character "Rapid Transit Rabbit", in reference to his frequent use of the New York City Subway system. The show was initially shot in black and white, but was later changed to color photography. In the summer of 1984, Chuck E. Cheese appeared as a guest on the show, hosting a party with a live audience of children. The children's happy reaction inspired Concepcion to make a walk-around fursuit costume for Rapid T. Rabbit. In 1986, Concepcion started wearing a costume built by Tony Guastella. A better costume was built by Stagecraft Inc. and funded by Caroll Spinney in 1990. Later a friend of Concepcion's refurbished the costume and added more fur to the ears, but also glued an additional layer of fur to the mesh vision under the nose.

In May 2010, Concepcion began writing Riding with the Rabbit, a monthly column in the Carousel News and Trader magazine. The Rapid T. Rabbit costume was rebuilt by Jess Hillard and Concepcion's friend Damian in December 2011. Hillard also drew art for the series (including a new title logo) and created a new puppet in 2013.

Concepcion died of natural causes on August 1, 2017.

== Main cast ==
- Rapid Transit Rabbit (Richard J. Concepcion) – Host.
- Cuppy (William Hohauser) – Co-host.
- Mejeep the Meeping Ferret – Co-host.
- Rupert (William Hohauser) – Supporting character and Rapid's nephew.

== Special guest appearances ==
- T.H.E. Fox
- Greg the Bunny
- Cody Coyote
- Dr. Demento
- Looney Bird
- Frank Sidebottom
- Tenderheart Bear and Bedtime Bear of The Care Bears
- Orwin Raccoon
- Mr. Rat from The Mr. Bear Today Show
- Rattus T. Rat
- Sandy the Seagull of the Brooklyn Cyclones
- Scooter the Holy Cow of the Staten Island Yankees
- Reggy from the Mascot Hall of Fame
- Soupy Sales
- Larry Storch
- Joe Franklin
- Arnold Stang
- Blitzer T. Wolf
- Bugs Bunny (Todd Michael Thornton)
- Chuck E. Cheese
- Paddington Bear
- Telly Monster (Martin P. Robinson) from Sesame Street
- Kermit Love
- Oscar the Grouch (Caroll Spinney) from Sesame Street
- Roger Rabbit (Jenn Waitt)
