= Mr. Cranky =

Mr. Cranky, a satirical film critic, was created in 1995 by Jason Katzman and Hans Bjordahl. The Cranky personae premises that all films are terrible; at issue, solely, is the degree. There are no good films in the Cranky pantheon, only films which inflict greater or lesser suffering. Films are rated on a six-step scale. The least bad (i.e. best) film receive one "bomb", and films that cause greater suffering receive additional "bombs", up to four. Films deemed particularly offensive receive a Dynamite or "Boomstick" rating. The worst films receive the Animated Atomic Explosion or "Kaboom!" rating.

In October 2001, a "guest reviewer" named Mr. Smiley appeared. Mr. Smiley is a mirror opposite of the Mr. Cranky personae: all reviews are hyperbolically positive. Mr. Smiley is a stereotypical smiley face smelling a pink Freesia flower, appearing every year near Halloween. Consistent with the theme, the Smiley character has a rising five-step scale going from one smiley face to the "Prozacerrific!" Happy Pill.

== Origins ==
Mr. Cranky, who takes the form of a self-gagging purple frowny-face, appears on the website Shadowculture's Mr. Cranky Rates the Movies. The character was created for a Colorado-based website named XOR. Katzman, the primary writer, and Bjordahl, his editor, purchased the rights to the feature in 1998 and established Cranky's website, which includes an archive of reviews, editorials, and message boards.

The Mr. Cranky reviews appeared on the Chicago Tribune website. They can be found in print in both the Tribune's free publication RedEye and in the self-published trade paperback book Shadowculture's Mr. Cranky Presents: The 100 Crankiest Movie Reviews Ever (Author House, 2004; ISBN 1-4184-4812-5)

Jason Katzman is employed at the University of Colorado and contributes articles to MSNBC. Hans Bjordahl worked on the webcomic Where the Buffalo Roam and is employed by Microsoft.

On July 3, 2008, the homepage announced the character's retirement, but the site came back with a redesign and guest writers. As of 2018, it no longer loads.
