= Red Meat (comic strip) =

American comic strip by Max Cannon

- Bug-Eyed Earl (2014-06-24)
- Author: Max Cannon
- Website: redmeat.com
- Current status/schedule: Weekly
- Launch date: 1989
- Genre(s): Black comedy, Surreal comedy

Red Meat is a three panel black-and-white comic strip by Max Cannon. First published in 1989, it has appeared in over 80 newspapers, mainly alternative weeklies and college papers in the United States and in other countries. It has been available online since November 1996.

== Style ==
A visual hallmark of the strip is the almost total lack of movement of the characters from panel to panel, and a "featureless void" of no background. Cannon has said that he wanted Red Meat "to have a look that was somewhere between clip art and arresting minimalism, so that the text was more important than the art itself".

Lambiek's Comiclopedia describes Red Meat as "a collection of absurd and sometimes cruel comics". In 1996, Cannon described the essence of the strip as

To make people laugh without whacking them over the head with a big stick, or having to address a political message. There's plenty of people out there that do that way better than I could. It's just something that's sort of funny, sort of not. It deals with the things people really do but they don't want to admit that they do or say. Harshness, sadism, freakiness, cruelty, you know, the essence of humor... I'm just trying to portray what I find ironic or humorous. And I do think a lot of that has to do with achieving inner peace, and seeing the irony of what goes on around you without judgment.

Red Meat features unrelated "slug lines" at the top of each comic, which Cannon explains as "That's just my own form of personal poetry. It's a little something extra for those who don't like comics, but who love the English language." In 2005, Cannon's favorite slug lines included "Plastic fruit for a starving nation" and "Official pace car of the apocalypse."

== Characters ==
Red Meat features an extensive cast of characters with unusual characteristics and personalities, described by Spike Magazine as "small town America, [populated] entirely with grotesques." Many of the strip's human characters are 1950s caricatures, with Cannon commenting "Several of the characters are designed to have the look of late '50s, early 60s, real pleasant advertising art."

- Bug-Eyed Earl: A demented person, resembling Edgar Allan Poe and Steve Buscemi. Earl's appearances generally involve him telling a surreal, strange, and sometimes disgusting anecdote.
  - Floating Skull: the only character to appear alongside Bug-Eyed Earl, a radiant glowing skull with human eyes.
- Milkman Dan: A local milkman who is eccentric and hostile towards people and animals, and constantly battles sobriety. Dan also dresses as a cow in the part of McMoo, the anti-drug cow. Cannon said that "Milkmen seem so wholesome, and there's no way anybody can be that wholesome… I grew up in a military family, and there's something about that military-style uniform, all cleaned up, a brutal control effort the military necessarily breeds."
  - Karen: A neighborhood child who acts as Milkman Dan's nemesis, alternately being the victim or perpetrator of cruel pranks and gibes, described by Cannon as a "spoiled little brat."
  - Mailman Matt: A local mailman who constantly wears sunglasses, and matches Dan in his hostility towards people.
- Ted Johnson: A middle-aged out of shape office worker with a taste for sexual fetishes and unusual hobbies. Cannon has stated that Ted is based on his own father, and said that–despite some readers thinking so–he is not based on Bob Dobbs.
  - Ted's Wife: Cindy, a foil for Ted who appears almost entirely as speech bubbles originating off-panel.
  - Ted's Son: One of Ted's two boys, the victim of/participant in many of Ted's antics.
  - Ken: One of Ted's neighbors, depicted as hunched, stubbled, and balding, who fills various jobs throughout his appearances.
  - Nick: The basketball coach of Ted's son at Bronson Jr. High, depicted with a bald head, stubble, and constantly smoking a cigarette, prone to violence and nudity.
  - Clyde: A local inept handyman who works in Ted's neighborhood, depicted with a slouch and a pompadour hairstyle.
  - Don: One of Ted's neighbors and high-school friends, depicted with a slouch, shaved head, and a mustache. The only African-American character in the strip.
  - Vince: One of Ted's neighbors, a Frankenstein's monster-esque construction worker.
  - Steve: One of Ted's neighbors, a burn victim without lips or eyelids.
  - Reuben: One of Ted's neighbors, a tall Jack Webb style character, with a penchant for violence and murder.
- Johnny Lemonhead: A man with a large lemon-shaped head.
- Papa Moai: A godlike multi-dimensional entity in the shape of a living Easter Island Moai.
- Mister Wally: An older, bearded, balding man who acts as proprietor of a tobacconist when not appearing shirtless in public.
- The Old Cowboy: A man smoking a cigarette while leaning against a fence, wearing a cowboy hat and boots, who delivers monologues or converses with characters off-panel.
- Priest: A Catholic priest who stands, looking up, while carrying on conversations with God.
- Stubbo: A stubbled caricature of Sluggo Smith from the Nancy comic strip.
- Mr. Bix: A psychopathic robot who speaks in a polite manner but commits violent acts and sometimes vomits on other characters.

Other rarely or uniquely appearing characters include a self-described magical talking hand puppet, Stubbo's dog Pinky, a dead clown, Spuderman (a parody of Superman), Babyhead (a tuxedoed man with the head of a baby), Chet (Milkman Dan's dispatcher), Ponzo (a depressed French clown), Vern (a gag and novelty salesman), and Stiff Stacy (a parody of Dick Tracy).

== Publication ==
Last strip was published on July 25, 2023. Until then, Red Meat had a weekly release schedule. In 1989, after extensive prompting by his friend Joe Forkan, Cannon began producing the strip on a Macintosh SE using Adobe Illustrator. It was initially published in 1989 by the Arizona Daily Wildcat, the student newspaper of the University of Arizona, though Cannon was no longer a student of the university at the time. Two months later, it was picked up by the Tucson Weekly. Since then it has appeared over 80 publications, including The Onion. Red Meat is also available online, and has been published online since November 1996, making it one of the oldest still-running webcomics.

Red Meat has been published in several other languages, including French, Italian, Spanish, Danish, and Finnish. Localisers have changed some details, such as the Finnish translation making Milkman Dan into a mailman.

In 2009, Max Cannon urged his readers to contact the editors of their local alternative weekly papers in an effort to save the comics printed within. In a move applauded by Tom Tomorrow, of the weekly strip This Modern World. Red Meat returned to the pages of OC Weekly in 2012 after having been dropped in 2009.

On 4 June 2024, Max Cannon announced that he would be resuming publishing new strips as of July, following a "much-needed year off from the Red Meat strip after 33 years of producing a weekly comic." As of June 2026, no new comics have been published, but after being reduced to a "RED MEAT WILL RETURN" message in October 2025, the website returned by November 2025 as Red Meat Beta, with the about page saying "Welcome to the beta for redmeat.com. More coming."

At least three collections of the strips have been released:

- Red Meat (1997) ISBN 0-312-18302-X
- More Red Meat (1998) ISBN 0-312-19514-1
- Red Meat Gold (2005) ISBN 0-312-33014-6

== Reception ==
Bill Griffith, writing in the Boston Globe, identified the strip as a noteworthy example of "compelling comics on newsprint" in 1996. Matt Groening of Life in Hell, praised the strip with "In a culture full of sick, twisted, perverted art, Red Meat is up there at the top—it's that good." Spike Magazine described the strip as "a window into a parallel world that is uncomfortably close to the real one." Writing in The New York Times, John Hodgman described the strip as "a bracing, bitter tonic — the antidote to comics-page malaise, albeit one that might kill before it cures" and said that it was typified by "the baroquely dark imaginings that make Cannon's work more than a tiresome anti-comic."

The first Red Meat collection won a "Special Recognition/Wildcard" Firecracker Alternative Book Award in 1998.

== Web series ==
Cannon is the writer and creator of the ten-episode Comedy Central animated web series Shadow Rock, which was based on the Red Meat strip. The series consists of ten 2–4 minute length episodes, which were initially released on November 1st, 2005 as part of the "Comedy Central MotherLoad" web channel, eventually aired on Comedy Central itself as part of the six-episode half-hour late-night series Web Shows in 2007, and finally moved to Atom.com on April 18th, 2008.

=== Episodes ===
All episodes were written by Max Cannon, with theme music by Calexico. Animation for episodes one to six was by Gavrilo Gnatovich, while animation for episodes seven to ten was by James Forsmo. The narrator was voiced by Joe Spinoza, with other voices by Max Cannon, Gavrilo Gnatovich, Jimmy Waters, and Danielle Sottosanti.

No.	Title	Directed by	Written by	Runtime
1	"Dead Clown, Pt. 1"	Gavrilo Gnatovich	Max Cannon	2:00
2	"Dead Clown, Pt. 2"	Gavrilo Gnatovich	Max Cannon	2:06
3	"Golden Rain"	Gavrilo Gnatovich	Max Cannon	3:11
4	"Dead Clown, Pt. 3"	Gavrilo Gnatovich	Max Cannon	3:06
5	"Dead Clown, Pt. 4"	Gavrilo Gnatovich	Max Cannon	2:30
6	"Smelly's Cartoon Inferno"	Gavrilo Gnatovich	Max Cannon	2:57
7	"Camping Trip, Pt. 1"	Gavrilo Gnatovich	Max Cannon	2:57
8	"Camping Trip, Pt. 2"	Gavrilo Gnatovich	Max Cannon	2:42
9	"Father-Son Day"	James Forsmo	Max Cannon	3:54
10	"Watering the Lawn"	James Forsmo	Max Cannon	2:37

== Author ==
Max Cannon was born into a U.S. Air Force family (his father being a B-52 bomber pilot) on 16 July 1962 in Hunstanton, England, and spent his early years in England and Italy, before moving to Tucson, Arizona in 1977. He attended the University of Arizona, majoring in fine arts. Lambiek's Comiclopedia states that Cannon was born in England, but the Tucson Weekly described him as a "native Tucsonan".

Cannon also contributed to the second and third issues of Strange Tales, writing stories with Spider-Man and the Fantastic Four, respectively. In a 2009 interview, Cannon said that he taught college animation and was working on two screenplays and doing some preliminary writing on a graphic novel. From 2008 to 2014, Cannon worked as an instructor at the Southwest University of Visual Arts, and from 2014 to 2016 he worked as an adjunct instructor at The Art Institute of Tucson. He has also been a hospital worker, and reported on his experiences during the COVID-19 pandemic.
