= Helen, Sweetheart of the Internet =

1996–2005 webcomic

Helen, Sweetheart of the Internet is a comic strip which was drawn from 1996 through 2005 by American graphics artist Peter Zale. The strip describes a technically adept young woman who works at a technology firm. It was the first comic strip to make the leap from the Internet to newspaper syndication. It began online in 1996 and was syndicated to newspapers by Tribune Media Services beginning on June 5, 2000, and was removed from syndication after December 25, 2005.

== Characters and story ==
Helen is a woman too young, too smart and too messed up by her precocity to ever live a normal life. Zale drew her as a very intelligent buxom blonde bombshell, casting her against the "dumb blonde" stereotype. Her looks, though, meant almost nothing to her, and her femininity only occurred to her as an afterthought and was usually applied with more aggressiveness than any man had ever seen, mostly upon her boyfriend Spencer Green, a character that Zale introduced in a strip which he syndicated with the College Press in the early 1990s.

Helen's programming skills and their warped application led to her being defined as a modern-day mad scientist. Such things as making artificial intelligences without thinking it odd are common throughout the series.

A friendship with Pulitzer Prize-winning cartoonist Mike Peters led Zale into strip cartooning and away from his first love, comic books. He published his first continuing comic strips in The Chicago Maroon while an undergraduate at the University of Chicago.

Launched as an online-only comic in June 1996, Helen, Sweetheart of the Internet grew in popularity, receiving attention in The New York Times, New Straits Times, HOW, The Plain Dealer and other publications. It was syndicated by Tribune Media in 2000 simultaneous with McGraw-Hill's book collection, Techies Unite. At its peak, it was published in 60 newspapers.

In 1998, Zale and Christopher Baldwin created what is believed to be the "first Internet comics crossover" with the webcomic Bruno.

Following publication of the Christmas Day 2005 segment of Helen, Zale took leave of the strip in order to complete his MBA studies.

In 2014 the strip was pitched for development as a live-action television situation comedy also called Helen, Sweetheart of the Internet. The pilot was being developed for introduction in October 2014.

== Artist ==
Peter Zale is an illustrator and writer. His background is in graphics, technology and writing. He has extensive experience in desktop publishing and the internet. He started at Houghton-Mifflin (Boston), initially in publishing design, then moving into art direction, web design, and systems administration.

Zale went independent in the early 1990s, establishing a desktop publishing/design business: Peter Zale Paradezign. However, to support his growing family he joined an advertising agency, working in graphic design, art direction, web design, copy writing and electronic production. With a little extra evening time, he created the cartoon Helen, Sweetheart of the Internet, which debuted on the web in 1996.

Zale's cartooning credits also include a weekly technology-related strip, "The Bleeding Edge," for www.techrepublic.com, a leading information technology news site.

Zale holds a degree in English literature from the University of Chicago, and a degree in illustration from the Massachusetts College of Art. He lives in Cleveland, Ohio with his wife and their two daughters, Elizabeth and Charlotte.
