= Reggy the Purple Party Dude =

Fantasy character created by the Raymond Entertainment Group

Reggy the Purple Party Dude is a fantasy character created by the Raymond Entertainment Group. Reggy's more notable features include French fry hair, a boogie nose, and bright purple fur. Reggy the Purple Party Dude is one of the most popular traveling characters in sports. Comedy and dance routines have been a staple of his act since 2001. He is best known for his slapstick style and interactions with coaches and umpires on baseball fields throughout the US. Reggy also serves as the Mascot Hall of Fame’s official spokes character.

== History ==
Reggy the Purple Party Dude was created by the Raymond Entertainment Group in the fall of 2000 and was designed by Kathy Wilson. The character was constructed at Cafagno Studios in New York City. He was developed to be used as an entertainment feature that would be promoted by Raymond Entertainment. Reggy’s first appearance was a summer baseball tour in the spring of 2001. This first tour was led by David Raymond and Christopher Bruce. David Raymond was the original Phillie Phanatic for the Philadelphia Phillies and brought that character to life for its first 16 years from 1978 to 1993. David appeared as Reggy for the majority of this first summer, but he gave Christopher some experience as Reggy, because David was making an effort to transition out of performing. Following that first summer tour, Christopher Bruce took over as the performer and continues to perform as Reggy today.
