= T.H.E. Fox =

Furry webcomic by Joe Ekaitis

- Thaddeus Fox
- Author(s): Joe Ekaitis
- Current status/schedule: Concluded
- Launch date: 1986
- End date: 1998
- Genre(s): Furry
- Rating(s): PG

T.H.E. Fox is a furry webcomic by Joe Ekaitis which ran from 1986 to 1998. It is among the earliest online comics, predating Where the Buffalo Roam by over five years. T.H.E. Fox was published on CompuServe, Q-Link and GEnie, and later on the Web as Thaddeus. Despite running weekly for several years, the comic never achieved Ekaitis' goal of print syndication. Updates became less frequent, and eventually stopped altogether.

== Production ==
Initial strips—consisting of one panel each—were drawn as pixel art on a C64 KoalaPad, first using KoalaPainter, then Advanced OCP Art Studio. Each panel had a resolution of 160x200 in sixteen colors (or 320x200 in eight), and took from two hours to half a day to complete. Later strips were inked, then scanned onto a PC and touched up with Paintbrush. Characters were typically presented in a single plane, though some strips used oblique or perspective projection.

== Characters and themes ==
The comic consisted almost entirely of gags; some concerned the characters' animal natures, but Ekaitis preferred to cover news and exaggerate events of everyday life. (Note: Ekatis: "Since Thad and Bunn are more like people who happen to look like a fox and a rabbit, the gags seem to be funnier if their animal species don't enter into it. Everyday life is the best source for gags.") The main character—Thaddeus Horatio Eberhard, or simply Thaddeus Fox—was often seen interacting with his roommate, Bunnington Ellsworth Rabbit (Bunn E. Rabbit). Other regulars included Grizz Lee, M.D.; Wilt the Wolf; an unnamed coyote, and Thaddaeus' nephew, Ferdinand.

== Other appearances ==
Thaddeus (in fursuit form) and his creator appeared on the Rapid T. Rabbit and Friends show several times and the cable TV show carried most episodes of the comic strip for a number of years. Thaddeus also appeared with Rapid T. Rabbit in the Pasadena Doo Dah Parade. The comic was mentioned in the magazines .info and RUN, and was the subject of an interview by the Commodore 64/128 RoundTable. Thaddeus and Bunn also featured in editorial cartoons for the San Bernardino Sun regarding the O. J. Simpson murder case and the price of groceries, and appeared on the covers of Commodore journal Twin Cities 128 (TC-128).
