= User Friendly =

Webcomic by J. D. Frazer

- An example of a User Friendly comic strip
- Author(s): J. D. Frazer, a.k.a. "Illiad"
- Website: https://www.userfriendly.org/ (defunct)
- Current status/schedule: Completed
- Launch date: November 17, 1997 (Note: Frazer, JD ‘Illiad’ (November 17, 1997), "Cartoon with Strip Comments", UserFriendly.)
- End date: November 21, 2010
- Genre(s): Technology and geek humor

User Friendly was a webcomic written by J. D. Frazer, also known by his pen name Illiad. Starting in 1997, the strip was one of the earliest webcomics to make its creator a living. The comic is set in a fictional internet service provider and draws humor from dealing with clueless users and geeky subjects. The comic ran seven days a week until 2009, when updates became sporadic, and since 2010 it had been in re-runs only. The webcomic was shut down in late February 2022, after an announcement from Frazer.

== Premise ==
User Friendly is set inside a fictional ISP, Columbia Internet. According to reviewer Eric Burns, the strip is set in a world where "[u]sers were dumbasses who asked about cupholders that slid out of their computers, marketing executives were perverse and stupid and deserved humiliation, bosses were clueless and often naively cruel, and I.T. workers were somewhat shortsighted and misguided, but the last bastion of human reason... Every time we see Greg working, it's to deal with yet another annoying, self-important clueless user who hasn't gotten his brain around the digital world". Although mostly gag-a-day, the comic often had ongoing running arcs and occasionally continuing character through-lines.

=== Cast ===
==== A.J. Garrett ====
A.J., Illiad's alter ego, represents "the creative guy" in the strip, maintaining and designing websites. As a web designer, he's uncomfortably crammed in that tiny crevice between the techies and the marketing people. This means he's not disliked by anyone, but they all look at him funny from time to time. A.J. is shy and sensitive, loves most computer games and nifty art, and has a big-brother relationship with the Dust Puppy. A.J. is terrified of grues and attempts to avoid them. He was released from the company on two separate occasions but returned shortly thereafter.

In the strip as of September 16, 2005, he and Miranda (another character) are dating. They also have previously dated, but split up over a misunderstanding.

==== The Chief ====
The Chief is Columbia Internet's CEO. He is the leader of the techies and salespeople.

Illiad based the character on a former boss, saying, "The Chief is based on my business mentor. He was the vice president that I reported to back in the day. The Chief, like my mentor, is tall (!) and thin and sports a bushy ring around a bald crown, plus a very thick moustache." The Chief bears a superficial resemblance to the Pointy-Haired Boss of Dilbert fame. However, Illiad says that The Chief was not inspired by the Dilbert character. His personality is very different from the PHB, as well: he manages in the laissez-faire style, as opposed to the Marketing-based, micro-managing stance of the PHB. He has encouraged the office to standardise on Linux (much to Stef's chagrin).

==== Dust Puppy ====
Born in a server from a combination of dust, lint, and quantum events, the Dust Puppy looks similar to a ball of dust and lint, with eyes, feet and an occasional big toothy smile. He was briefly absent from the strip after accidentally being blown with compressed air while sleeping inside a dusty server.

Although the Dust Puppy is very innocent and unworldly, he plays a superb game of Quake. He also created an artificial intelligence named Erwin, with whom he has been known to do occasional song performances (or filks).

Dust Puppy is liked by most of the other characters, with the exceptions of Stef and the Dust Puppy's evil nemesis, the Crud Puppy.

First appearance December 3, 1997.

==== Crud Puppy ====
Crud Puppy (Lord Ignatius Crud) is the evil twin, born from the crud in Stef's keyboard; he is the nemesis of the Dust Puppy and sometimes takes the role of "bad guy" in the series. Examples include being the attorney/legal advisor of both Microsoft and then AOL or controlling a "Thing" suit in the Antarctic. He is most often seen in later strips in an Armani suit, usually sitting at the local bar with Cthulhu. The Crud Puppy first appeared in the strip on February 24, 1998.

==== Erwin ====
Erwin first appeared in the January 25, 1998 strip. Erwin is a highly advanced Artificial Intelligence (AI) created overnight during experimentation in artificial intelligence by the Dust Puppy, who was feeling kind of bored. Erwin is written in COBOL because Dust Puppy "lost a bet". Erwin passes the Turing test with flying colours, and has a dry sense of humour. He is an expert on any subject that is covered on the World Wide Web, such as Elvis sightings and alien conspiracies. Erwin is rather self-centered, and he is fond of mischievous pranks.

Originally, Erwin occupied the classic "monitor and keyboard" type computer with an x86 computer architecture, but was later given such residences as an iMac, a Palm III, a Coleco Adam on Mir, a Furby, a nuclear weapon guidance system, an SGI O2, a Hewlett-Packard Calculator (with reverse Polish notation, which meant that Erwin talked like Yoda for weeks afterward), a Lego Mindstorms construction, a Tamagotchi, a Segway, an IBM PC 5150, a Timber Wolf-class BattleMech, and an Internet-equipped toilet (with Dust Puppy being the toilet brush), as a punishment for insulting Hastur.

==== Greg Flemming ====
Greg is in charge of Technical Support in the strip. In other words, he's the guy that customers whine to when something goes wrong, which drives him nuts. He blows off steam by playing visceral games and doing bad things to the salespeople. He's not a bad sort, but his grip on his sanity hovers somewhere between weak and non-existent, and he once worked for Microsoft Quality Assurance.

==== Mike Floyd ====
Mike is the System Administrator of the strip and is responsible for running the network at the office. He's bright but prone to fits of anxiety. His worst nightmare is being locked in a room with a Windows 95 programmer and no hacking weapons in sight. He loves hot ramen straight out of a styrofoam cup.

==== Miranda Cornielle ====
Miranda is a trained systems technologist, an experienced UNIX sysadmin, and very, very female. Her technical abilities unnerve the other techs, but her obvious physical charms compel them to stare at her, except for Pitr, who is convinced she is evil. Although she has few character flaws, she does express sadistic tendencies, especially towards marketers and lusers. Miranda finds Dust Puppy adorable.

She and A.J. are dating as of September 16, 2005, although she was previously frustrated by his inability to express himself and his love for her. This comes after years of missed opportunities and misunderstandings, such as when A.J. poured his feelings into an email and Miranda mistook it for the ILOVEYOU email worm and deleted it unread.

==== Pitr Dubovich ====
Pitr is the administrator of the Columbia Internet server and a self-proclaimed Linux guru. He suddenly began to speak with a fake Slavic accent as part of his program to "Become an Evil Genius." He has almost succeeded in taking over the planet several times. His sworn enemy is Sid, who seems to outdo him at every turn. Pitr's achievements include: making the world's (second) strongest coffee, merging Coca-Cola, Pepsi into Pitr-Cola and making Columbia Internet millions with a nuclear weapon purchased from Russia, and the infamous Vigor text editor. He briefly worked for Google, nearly succeeding in world domination, but was released from there and returned to Columbia Internet. Despite his vast efforts to become the ultimate evil character, his lack of illheartedness prevents him from reaching such achievement.

==== Sid Dabster ====
Sid is the oldest of the geeks and very knowledgeable. His advanced age gives him the upper hand against Pitr, whom he has outdone on several occasions, including in a coffee-brewing competition and in a round of Jeopardy! that he hacked in his own favor. Unlike Pitr, he has no ambitions for world domination per se, but he is a friend of Hastur and Cthulhu (based on the H. P. Lovecraft Mythos characters). He was hired in September 2000 and he had formerly worked for Hewlett-Packard, with ten years' experience It is his habit, unlike the other techs, to dress to a somewhat professional degree; when he first came to work, Smiling Man, the head accountant, expressed shock at the fact that Sid was wearing his usual blue business suit. He is also a fan of old technology, having grown up in the age of TECO, PDP-6es, the original VT100, FORTRAN, IBM 3270 and the IBM 5150; one could, except for the decent taste in clothing, categorise him as a Real Programmer. He was once a cannabis smoker, as contrasted with the rest of the technological staff, who prefer caffeine (Greg in the form of cola, Miranda in the form of espresso). This had the unfortunate effect of causing lung cancer and he was treated by an oncologist. He has since recovered from the cancer and was told he has another 20 years or so to live.

==== Pearl Dabster ====
Sid Dabster's beautiful daughter. The character appeared for the first time in the strip of Aug. 30, 2001. Pearl is often seen getting the better of the boys. She is the antagonist of Miranda, and occasionally the object of Pitr's affections, much to the chagrin of Sid. Some people (both in strip and in the real world) wrongly assume that the character was named after the scripting language PERL. While this may be the true intention of the author, in the script timeline, is shown to be an error based on wordplay.

==== Smiling Man ====
The Smiling Man is the company comptroller. He is in charge of accounts, finances, and expenditures. He smiles all day for no reason. This in itself is enough to terrify most normal human beings (even via phone). However, the Dust Puppy, the "Evilphish", a delirious Stef, and a consultant in a purple suit have managed to get him to stop smiling first. His favourite wallpaper is a large, complex, and utterly meaningless spreadsheet.

==== Stef Murky ====
Stef is the strip's Corporate Sales Manager. He runs most of the marketing efforts within the firm, often selling things before they exist. He is a stereotypical marketer, with an enormous ego and a condescending attitude toward the techies; they detest him and frequently retaliate with pranks. He sucks at Quake, even once managing to die at the startup screen in Quake III Arena; in addition, he manages to die by falling into lava in any game that contains it, including games where it is normally impossible to step in said lava. Although he admires Microsoft and frequently defends their marketing tactics, infuriating the techies, he has a real problem with Microsoft salesmen, probably because they make much more money than he does. His attitude towards women is decidedly chauvinist; he lusts after Miranda who will not have anything to do with him. Stef is definitely gormless, as demonstrated on January 14, 2005.

== Production ==
In a 2008 article, reviewer Eric Burns said that as best he could tell, Frazer had produced strips seven days a week, without missing an update for, at that time, almost 11 years. Frazer would draw several days' worth of comics in advance, but the Sunday comic – based on current events and in color – was always drawn for immediate release and did not relate to the regular storyline.

The website for User Friendly included other features such as Link of the Day and Iambe Intimate & Interactive, a weekly editorial written under the pseudonym "Iambe".

In late 1999, User Friendly and Sluggy Freelance swapped a character (A.J. and Torg).

The strip and Loki Software teamed up for player skin and custom level contest for Quake III Arena in 2000. A Flash cartoon based on the series was also produced.

=== Author ===
J. D. Frazer was born in 1969. He began his career in law enforcement and served as a corrections officer, hoping eventually to join the Royal Canadian Mounted Police, but he changed his mind, leaving law enforcement to pursue more creative endeavours. He worked as a game designer, production manager, art director, project manager, Web services manager, writer, creative director, and cartoonist. As of 2014 he lived in Vancouver, British Columbia, Canada.

=== Creation ===
Frazer started writing User Friendly in 1997. According to Frazer, he started cartooning at age 12. He had tried to get into cartooning through syndicates with a strip called Dust Puppies, but it was rejected by six syndicates. Later, while working at an ISP, he drew some cartoons which his co-workers enjoyed. He then drew a month's worth of cartoons and posted them online. After that, he quit his job and then worked on the comic.

=== Success ===
Writer Xavier Xerxes said that in the very early days of webcomics, Frazer was probably one of the bigger success stories and was one of the first to make a living from a webcomic. Eric Burns attributed initial success of the comic to the makeup of the early internet, saying, "In 1997, a disproportionate number of internet users... were in the I.T. Industry. When User Friendly began gathering momentum, there wasn't just little to nothing like it on the web -- it appealed and spoke to a much larger percentage of the internet reading audience than mainstream society would support outside of that filter.... in the waning years of the 20th Century, it was a safe bet that if someone had an internet connection in the first place, they'd find User Friendly funny."

On April Fools' Day 1999, the site appeared to be shut down permanently after a third party sued. In future years, the April 1st cartoon referenced back to the disruption that was caused.

In a 2001 interview, Frazer said that he was not handling fame well, and pretended not to be famous in order to keep his life normal. He said that his income came from sponsorship, advertising, and sales of printed collections. These compilations have been published by O'Reilly Media.

Since 2000, User Friendly had been published in a variety of newspapers, including The National Post in Canada and the Linux Journal magazine.

=== Ideas ===
In a 2001 interview, Frazer estimated that about 40% of strip ideas came from reader submissions, and occasionally he would get submissions that he would use "unmodified". He also said that he educated himself on the operating system BSD in order to make informed jokes about it.

In 2009, Frazer was found to be copying punchlines found in the MetaFilter community. After one poster found a comment on MetaFilter that was similar to a User Friendly comic, users searched and found several other examples. Initially, Frazer posted on MetaFilter saying "I get a flurry of submissions and one-liners every week, and I haven't checked many of them at all, because I rarely had to in the past" but later admitted that he had taken quotes directly from the site. On his website, Frazer said, "I offered no attribution or asked for permission [for these punchlines], over the last couple of years I've infringed on the expression of ideas of some (who I think are) clever people. Plagiarized. My hypocrisy seems to know no bounds, as an infamous gunman was once heard saying. I sincerely apologize to my readers and to the original authors. I offer no excuses and accept full blame and responsibility. As a result, I'll be modifying the cartoons in question. No, it won't happen again. Yes, I've immersed myself in mild acid."

While published books still contain at least one cartoon with a punchline taken from MetaFilter, Frazer has removed these cartoons from the website, or updated them to quote and credit the source of the punchlines, and fans searched through the archives to ensure that none of the other punchlines have been plagiarized.

=== Suspension ===
The strip went on hiatus from June 1, 2009 to August 2009 for personal reasons. In this period, previous strips were re-posted.

A second hiatus lasted from December 1, 2009 until August 1, 2010, again for personal reasons. New cartoons, supplied by the community as part of a competition, started to appear as of August 2, 2010.

From November 1, 2010 through November 21, 2010, Illiad published a special "Remembrance Day story arc", and stated that it is "vague and at this point random" what will happen to the strip afterwards, that "going daily again is highly unlikely", but that "there are still many stories that I want to tell through UF, over time". Since then, previous comics have been re-posted on a daily basis.

After the de facto stop of publishing new content, three one-off comics commemoration special occasions were published:

- 19/03-2011: The Fukushima nuclear disaster
- 09/10-2011: The death of Steve Jobs
- 01/01-2012: The death of Dennis Ritchie

On 24 February 2022, Illiad announced that the website would be shut down soon, "at the end of this month. If not, it won't be much later than that."

At approximately midnight Pacific Time on the evening of 28 February 2022, the website was shut down.

== Reviews ==
User Friendly has received mixed reviews over the years.

In a 2008 review, Eric Burns of Websnark called it a "damned good comic strip", but felt it had several problems. Burns felt that the strip had not evolved in several years, saying "his strip is exactly the same today as it was in 1998... the same characters, the same humor, the same punchlines, the same punching bags as before." Burns said that characters learn no lessons, and that "[i]f Frazer uses copy and paste to put his characters in, he's been using the same clip art for the entire 21st century." Burns also criticised the stereotypical depiction of idiotic computer users as outdated. But fundamentally, Burns found the strip funny, saying anyone who had worked IT would likely find it funny, and even those who had not will find something in it amusing. Burns felt that some criticism of User Friendly came from seeing it as general webcomic, rather than one targeted at a specific audience of old-school IT geeks, and he considered that the targeted approach was a good business model.

Writer T Campbell declared JD Frazer's work as "ow[ing] a heavy debt to [Scott] Adams, but his 'nerdcore' was a purer sort: the jokes were often for nerds ONLY-- NO NON-TECHIES ALLOWD [sic]." He continued "He wasn't the first webtoonist to target his audience so precisely, but he was the first to do it on a daily schedule, and that kind of single-minded dedication is something most techies could appreciate. User Friendly set the tone for nerdcore strips to follow." Time magazine called User Friendly "a strip in the wry, verbal vein of Doonesbury...the humor is a combination of pop culture references and inside jokes straight outta the IT department." The strip was among the most notable of a wave of similar strips, including Help Desk by Christopher B. Wright, General Protection Fault by Jeffrey T. Darlington, The PC Weenies by Krishna Sadasivam, Geek & Poke by Oliver Widder, Working Daze by John Zakour, and The Joy of Tech by Liza Schmalcel and Bruce Evans.

Comic writer and artist Joe Zabel said that User Friendly "may be one of the earliest webcomics manifestation of the use of templates... renderings of the characters that are cut and pasted directly into the comic strip... I think the main significance of User Friendly is that in 1997 it was really, really crude in every respect. Horrible artwork, terrible storyline, zilch characterization, and extremely dull, obvious jokes. And yet it was a smash hit! I think this demonstrates that the public will embrace just about anything if it's free and the circumstances are right. And it indicates that new internet users of the time were really hungry, downright starving, for entertainment.... his current work [speaking in 2005] is comparatively slick and professional. But I suspect that his early work had enormous influence, because it encouraged thousands of people with few skills and little talent to jump into the webcomics field." Zabel also credited User Friendly's success in part to its "series mascot", Dust Puppy, saying that "the popular gag-a-day cartoons almost always have some kind of mascot."

The webcomic Penny Arcade produced a strip in 1999 just to criticise Frazer, saying "people will pass up steak once a week for crap every day." They also criticized the commercialism of the enterprise. By contrast, CNET included it on 2007 a list of "sidesplitting tech comics", Mashable included it in a 2009 list of the 20 best webcomics and Polygon listed it as one of the most influential webcomics of all time in 2018. It has also been noted by FromDev, Brainz, RiskOptics, DondeQ2, and Pingdom. CBR.com concluded the comic had aged poorly in a 2023 rundown.

Lawrence I. Charters appreciated the nature of the titles used for the published books. Francis Glassborow cited the specificity of the humour, which also lead Retro Activity to find the strip "difficult to recommend" along with the limited art style. Mike Kaltschnee also mentioned the weakness of the art, but was impressed at Illiad maintaining publication of a strip every day. "Webcomics: The Influence and Continuation of the Comix Revolution" described how the strip represented the counter-cultural aspects of the open-source software movement. Dustin Puryear observed how the strip represents the conflicts between the computer literate and newer less informed users. Christine Moellenberndt wrote about the online community spawned around the comic strip.

In 2007, User Friendly was part of an exhibit at The Museum of Comic and Cartoon Art called Infinite Canvas: The Art of Webcomics.

== Bibliography ==
Several cartoon compilations have been published:

- User Friendly, v1.0, Plan Nine Publishing, 2002, ISBN 1-929462-39-5 (collects earlier strips)
- User Friendly, O'Reilly, 1999, ISBN 1-56592-673-0 January 25, 1998 – December 25, 1998 (misses out December 20 and probably some others)
- Evil Geniuses in a Nutshell, O'Reilly, 2000, ISBN 1-56592-861-X January 3, 1999 – December 11, 1999
- The Root of All Evil, O'Reilly, 2001, ISBN 0-596-00193-2 January 1, 2000 – December 31, 2000
- Even Grues Get Full, O'Reilly, 2003, ISBN 0-596-00566-0 January 1, 2001 – November 17, 2001
- User Friendly – Die Deutsche Dialekt-Ausgabe (translation to several German dialects) ISBN 3-89721-380-X
- Ten Years of UserFriendly.Org, Manning Dec 2008, ISBN 978-1-935182-12-2 a 1000-page hardback collection of every script with some comments by the author.
