= Real Life (webcomic) =

American webcomic by Maelyn Dean

- Strip from 2005-08-01
- Author: Maelyn Dean
- Website: reallifecomics.com
- Current status/schedule: Semi-active
- Launch date: 1999-11-15
- Genre: Exaggerated reality

Real Life is an American webcomic drawn and authored by Maelyn Dean. It began on November 15, 1999, and is still updated, after breaks from December 10, 2015, to September 10, 2018, and again from July 16, 2019, to June 15, 2020, from December 6, 2022 to February 26, 2024, and most recently, from April 9, 2024, to present. The comic is loosely based around the lives of fictionalized versions of Dean and her friends, including verbatim conversations, as well as fictional aspects including time travel and mecha combat. Characters regularly break the fourth wall. Real Life focuses on humor related to video games and science fiction, and references internet memes.

== Development ==
Real Life launched in 1999 and became part of Keenspot shortly after. Dean switched to the Blank Label Comics collective in 2005 before going solo again in February 2010. The Real Life website is currently self-hosted by Dean.

Year one of Real Life was published as a paperback by Starline Multimedia Inc. in 2004, and a second book published by Lulu was released in 2008. A German translation of some portions of the webcomic has been made available on the website's archive.

== Characters ==
- Greg / Maelyn (Maelyn Dean) - The main character of the strip, and a fictional representation of the author of the comic. She seems to vacillate between being the voice of reason and the voice in need of reason. She is also very fond of Pepsi, to the point of addiction, going so far as to import Mexican Pepsi because it contains real sugar instead of corn syrup. She used to work as a fuel jock at a small airport, but eventually attended and graduated from culinary school. She previously lived in Sacramento and Rancho Cordova, both California, but moved to San Francisco - and moved again to Lockhart, Texas, but moved back to the California area, where she is once again roommates with Dave and Tony. (In June 2020, the author came out as transgender. Older comics before this point will feature Greg, and newer comics will feature Maelyn.)
- Elizabeth "Liz" Dean (née Van Buskirk) - Maelyn's wife, and an avid cosplayer; most of the strips have her acting as straight man in contrast to Maelyn's antics. She started out as "Lizzy" to avoid confusion between the "Liz" that had already appeared in the comic and this new Liz. Eventually, the old Liz was phased out and now the new one is called Liz. Liz and Maelyn married in March 2005.
- Tony Flansaas - The comic's resident evil overlord, and the fulcrum on which most of Real Life's more far-fetched story lines revolve. They have made many attempts over the course of the comic's existence to take over the world, and has even succeeded a couple of times.
- Dave Reynolds - Resident powergamer and supernerd. While the real Dave's currently in the Navy, that doesn't stop him from showing up and adding some of his cynical, nerdy point of view to a strip. Dave rivals Tony in technical ability. However, whereas Tony seems to be a genius in all subjects, Dave's genius seems to lie mostly in computers. In one of the earlier comic strips, Dave upgraded his computer into a sentient being. The computer, PAL, went on to become a minor character in the strip, and was joined over time by several other technologically improved computers and consoles.
- Crystal - Maelyn's girlfriend when the strip started, but they broke up in 2001. She is no longer mentioned or appears in the strip, but was an integral part of the first year of the strip.
- The Cartoonist - Cartoonist Maelyn primarily appears in the strip to make an announcement, to answer questions that readers occasionally send her or to complain about a possible lack of ideas for the strip. Her appearance originally was differentiated from her comic counterpart by a change of colours (light brown overshirt, black tee with white stripes), and slightly shaggy hair. When the character came out as transgender, the Cartoonist was differentiated with longer hair and a different outfit.
- Harper Dean - a daughter of Maelyn and Liz. Born on July 29, 2011.

== Reception ==
Maelyn Dean won the "Outstanding Reality Comic" category of the Web Cartoonists' Choice Awards four times: in 2001, 2003 (when her webcomic tied with Nowhere Girl), 2004, and 2005 (when her webcomic tied with The Devil's Panties).

== Collected editions ==
- Real Life: The Year One Collection. Starline Multimedia Inc. 2004-08-25. ISBN 0-9746966-2-5 ISBN 978-0974696621
- Real Life: The Greg's Notes Edition. Lulu. 2008
