= Art Comics Daily =

1995-2007 webcomic by Bebe Williams

Art Comics Daily is a webcomic first published in March 1995 by Bebe Williams, who lives in Arlington, Virginia, United States. One of the first webcomics, it was drawn and written exclusively for the Internet rather than in print in order to reserve some artistic freedom, and was one of the first comics exclusive to the World Wide Web. Williams has created two other daily webcomics – Bobby Rogers and Just Ask Mr-Know-It-All – and Art Comics Daily has been on permanent hiatus since 2007.

== History ==
After Williams' comic strips were repeatedly rejected by newspaper syndicates, he brought them to the Internet where he had more artistic freedom. He saw in webcomics the possibility to earn money from advertisers or help land a job as a print cartoonist. In 1998 he described his views about online publishing to The Atlanta Journal and Constitution: "Cartoonists can show comics to an audience despite the powers-that-be at print syndicates, who are not interested in modern alternative humor. It's my belief that the print syndicates are holding back the evolution of modern dailies in general."

Williams has created two other daily webcomics, one being the Xeric Award winning photo comic Bobby Ruckers, and the other being Just Ask Mr-Know-It-All. The website for Art Comics Daily has also hosted webcomics by other artists. However, Art Comics Daily itself now appears to be on permanent hiatus, having last updated in February, 2007.

== Reception ==
The Australian has described Williams' webcomics as being "strange but diverting" and having more sociocultural leanings than Doonesbury and Dilbert.
