= NetBoy =

- Panel of NetBoy
- Author: Stafford Huyler
- Website: www.netboy.com
- Launch date: May 1994

NetBoy is a webcomic created by Stafford Huyler. Publishing began in May, 1994. Drawn as a stick figure, the comic character NetBoy is an Internet innocent with his greatest joy in life being "fast .GIFs."

== Development ==
Huyler grew up in Winnetka, Illinois as the oldest of three brothers. Bored throughout high school, he skipped college and in 1988 started an electronic graphics business with his father. The company the two created folded up within a year, however, and the NetBoy concept was slowly forming while Huyler worked as a pizza deliverer and programmed digital keyboards for musicians.

Huyler started uploading NetBoy on the World Wide Web when he was 23 years old and worked as a creative director for Chicago-based internet provider InterAccess. The stick figure character was designed as an "Internet innocent" because, as Huyler put it at the time, "the Internet needs a good parody." According to Huyler, each of the characters in the webcomic are based on people one may find on the internet. Huyler started selling NetBoy T-shirts within a year of the webcomic's release. When NetBoy was accessed by six users every second in December 1994, the server it was hosted on crashed, which prompted Huyler to go on hiatus for three months so that he could design a server that could better serve the rising demands. In March 1995, Huyler estimated NetBoy's following to be at 1 million people.

== Reception ==
The webcomic was recommended by Wired in October, 1994 as "comics for the hardcore geek." NetBoy was featured in The Milwaukee Journal as the "leading cartoon denizen of the Internet" in January 1995.
