= Bruno (webcomic) =

Webcomic by Christopher Baldwin

- Logo
- Author: Christopher Baldwin
- Website: http://www.brunostrip.com
- Launch date: 1 January 1996
- End date: 14 February 2007

Bruno was a webcomic written and drawn by Christopher Baldwin from 1 January 1996 to 14 February 2007, after initially appearing in print in The Massachusetts Daily Collegian starting 27 January 1994. Its plot concerns the life of an introspective young woman, set in the real world. Her unusual name comes from the Italian philosopher Giordano Bruno. In 1998 Peter Zale and Baldwin created the "first Internet comics crossover" between their respective webcomics Helen, Sweetheart of the Internet and Bruno.

== Themes and literary style ==
Bruno deals with various issues through the daily life of the main character and her friends. During the run of the comic, topics included homosexuality, religion, depression, and politics. The comic is characterized by lengthy and sometimes angst-ridden dialogue between the characters, occasionally punctuated by a single panel with a contemplative scene without words. The storylines follow the life of Bruno (somewhat autobiographically) as she quits college, visits friends in various American towns, travels to Europe, falls into and out of relationships, and publishes her novel. As the timeline of the comic follows real time, we gradually see Bruno evolving from a free-spirited college student into a more contemplative woman. Her quest to find her place in life changes but continues to be a main theme of the comic.

== Artistic style ==
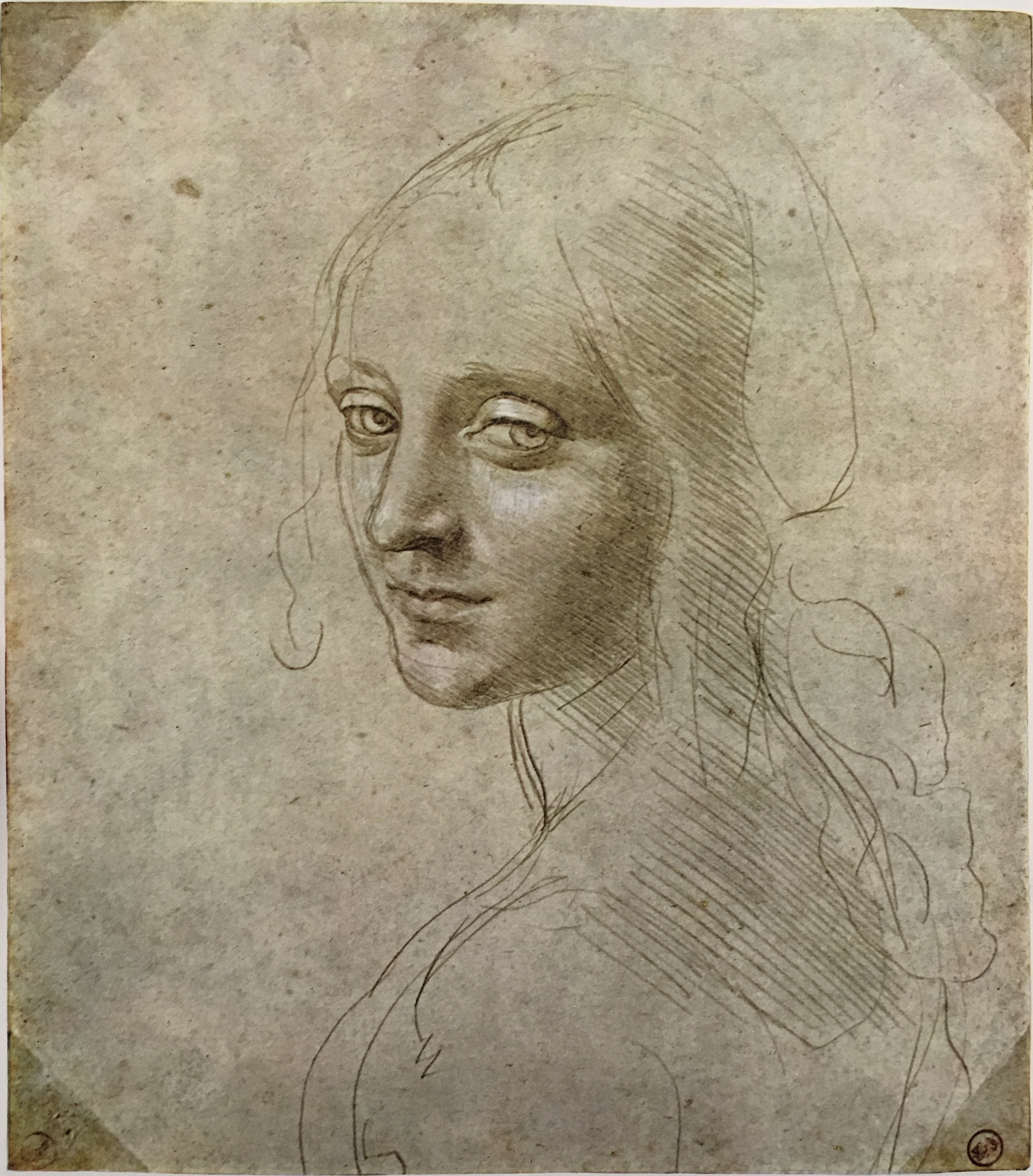
A sketch by Leonardo for his Madonna of the Rocks, which was the original basis for Bruno's character design.

The style of the drawings is mostly naturalistic and detailed, with some aspects of a few character designs caricatured. The backgrounds are mostly of real-life places converted to black and white outlines penciled over and shaded with cross-hatching. Bruno's face is based roughly on a sketch of an angel's head by Leonardo da Vinci.

== Conclusion ==
On 26 December 2006, Baldwin announced the conclusion of Bruno, then scheduled for 12 February 2007. The webcomic eventually concluded on 14 February 2007, coinciding with the announcement of the tenth and final Bruno book.

== Bibliography ==
Baldwin has produced ten Bruno books. The first three were originally hand bound. The current soft-cover versions still bear the photographic representation of this binding.

1. Uh...Hey..Mom and Dad, I'm Dropping Out of College, (1996), ISBN 0-9667574-0-8
2. Bread and Circuses, (1998), ISBN 0-9667574-1-6
3. These Troubled Soles, (1998), ISBN 0-9667574-2-4
4. The Seventh Cause (Or The Lie Direct), (1999), ISBN 0-9667574-4-0
  - Omnibus (2004) combining books 3 and 4, ISBN 0-9765483-1-3
5. Something Lost, (2000), ISBN 0-9667574-5-9
6. PDX: Love, God, Sex, and Cinema, (2001), ISBN 0-9667574-6-7
7. Lebensraum, (2002), ISBN 0-9667574-7-5
8. Eleven Months Early, (2003), ISBN 0-9667574-8-3
9. Once Removed, (2005), ISBN 0-9765483-0-5
10. Gina, (2007), ISBN 0-9765483-3-X
  Note: A 16-page stapled supplement to Gina was also produced.
