= Christopher Baldwin =

American comic book artist

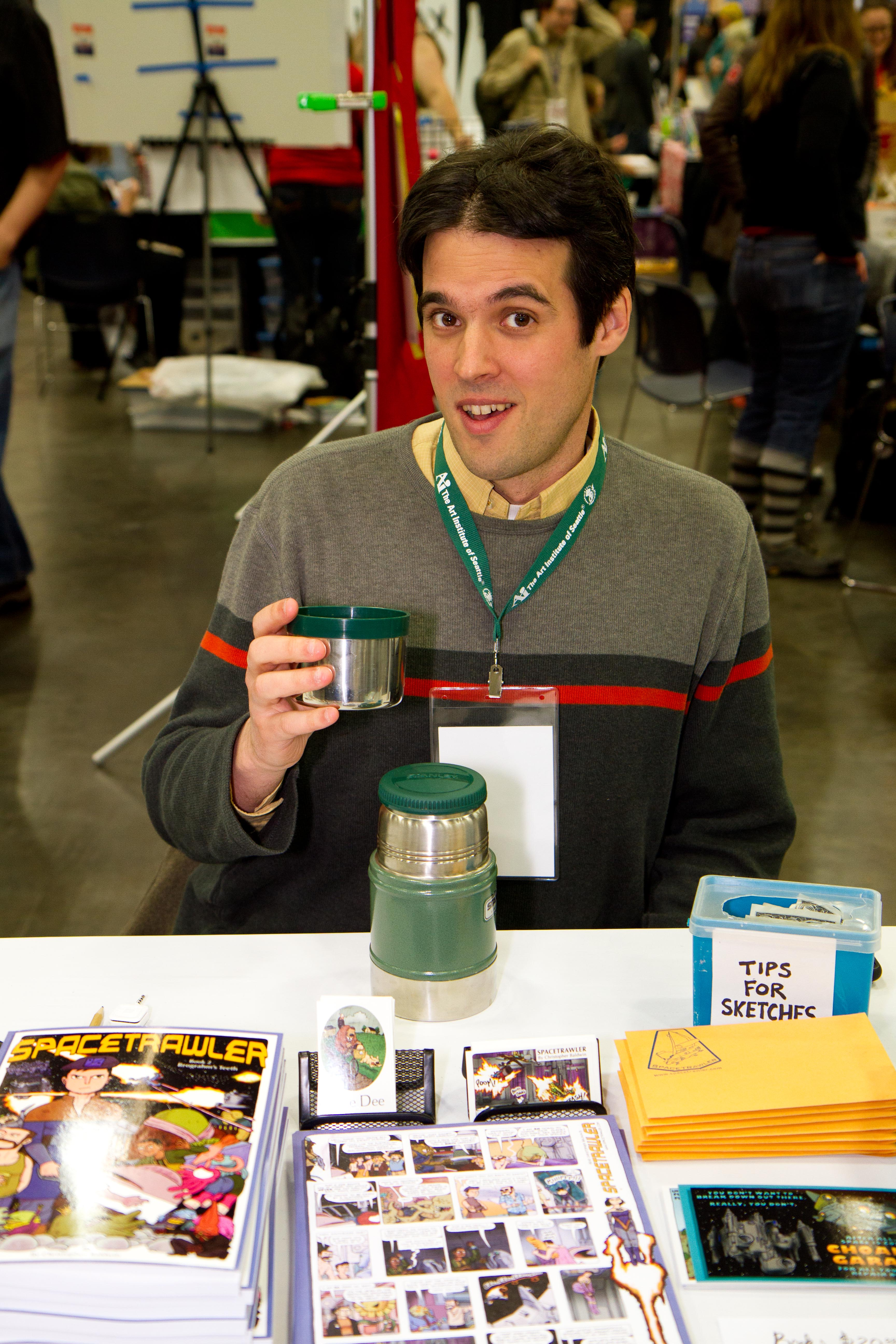
- Chris Baldwin at Stumptown Comics Fest, on April 28, 2012
- Born: February 25, 1973 (age 53) Montague, Massachusetts, USA
- Areas: Webcomics author and illustrator
- Notable works: Bruno, Little Dee, Spacetrawler, One Way

Christopher Baldwin (born February 25, 1973) is an American illustrator and author of several webcomics, the most significant being Bruno, a story of the life of an introspective young woman set in the real world. Other works include shorter webcomic series, some being intentionally designed to attract syndication; these tend to be lighter in tone than Bruno. They include Shepard and May (published for 5 weeks in 2000), Kim in Love (published from October 1, 2001 to October 22, 2001), and Madge's Diary (published from November 5, 2001 to January 18, 2002). Little Dee, about a young girl adopted by a bear, was released on June 7, 2004 for syndication and completed in April 2010. Baldwin later published the science fiction webcomics Spacetrawler and One Way. Apart from comics, Baldwin also wrote the 2003 novel Loved into Submission: a Dark Existential Farce.

== Biography ==
Christopher was born in Montague, Massachusetts and spent his childhood in Greenfield, Massachusetts. By his own account he had drawn over 30 comic books by 1991. After leaving college early in 1994, he took on various freelance jobs, and traveled to Europe where he took source pictures to incorporate in the Bruno comic. He similarly traveled across America, taking source photographs, settling in Portland, Oregon, then residing in Olympia, Washington.

== Webcomics ==
=== Bruno ===
Bruno is a webcomic that was written and drawn by Baldwin from January 1, 1996 to February 14, 2007. Its story lines revolve around the life of an introspective young woman, set in the real world. Her unusual name comes from the Italian philosopher Giordano Bruno.

=== Little Dee ===
Little Dee is a webcomic by Baldwin that began on June 7, 2004, that The Washington Post termed "charming", and others called "genuinely innocent and funny", "never unpleasant", and "age appropriate". The webcomic is about a little girl (Dee) who becomes lost in the woods. She is befriended by three animals: a bear, a vulture and a dog. The animals talk; Dee doesn't.

=== Spacetrawler ===
Spacetrawler is a space opera webcomic that originally ran from January 1, 2010 to December 25, 2013. The plot involves a group of men and women from Earth who have been kidnapped and pressed into service by an alien as part of a plan to end the enslavement of another alien species. The comic began updating again with a new story in 2016.

=== One Way ===
One Way, a science-fiction webcomic started after the conclusion of Spacetrawler, follows a crew of astronauts sent by humanity to make contact with an alien race.

=== Glens Falls ===
Glens Falls is a graphic novel describing the city of Glens Falls, New York.
