= Polymer City Chronicles =

American webcomic

The Polymer City Chronicles
- Author(s): Chris Morrison
- Website: http://www.polymercitychronicles.com/
- Current status/schedule: "Hiatus"
- Launch date: 1995 March 13
- Genre(s): Science fiction, Parody, Action

The Polymer City Chronicles (aka PCC) is a webcomic written and drawn by Chris Morrison. PCC began publishing online in March 1995 as the first video gaming webcomic on the World Wide Web, although the strip has been in print since 1992.

Artistically, PCC's most distinctive trait is its collection of large (often termed "amazon sized"), well-proportioned females (many of which sport oversized bosoms coupled with detailed musculature development).

The strip started out as a video game gag comic, but quickly changed focus into a strongly plot-driven comic due to "running out of video game material". The artist has often said that he's trying to create an animated film appearance, and has noted that the primary story arc is a part of a script he is developing for a feature-length film. Often weaving in subtexts of real-world events and issues such as religion and politics into the frequently text-heavy stories, PCC continues to have a strong fanbase on the web.

In February 2007, Morrison announced that he intended for the strip "to evolve again in a way that's a bit more drastic than before," "ceasing the webcomic format altogether in favor of illustrated fiction, wherein the story will be delivered in small chapters, each with an accompanying illustration." However, he reversed this decision in May, citing financial problems, the continuity of the present storyline, and reader concerns, and plans a return to the twice-a-week strip format.

No strips have been posted since 31 October 2007; however, in the only update since then, a one-line blog entry on 4 January 2009, Morrison implies that PCC may return.

== Summary ==
The strip presents the (mis)adventures of Dr. Otto and his space-alien wife Andrah (a favorite among fans of female muscle growth themed artwork). In an interview in 2001 with former online magazine "The Mushroom", the author provided a description which is still relevant today:

"Dr.Otto is pretty much a scientific everyman; he was originally conceived as a satire of Egon Spengler (Ghostbusters) only with a hair-trigger. Andrah was loosely based on an ex-girlfriend of mine from years ago who was an amateur female bodybuilder; she was around 6 ft 2 in and 200 lb (91 kg) or so, and Andrah carries a lot of her personality. Mistress Laura was initially a Lady Death parody, but when I introduced her shadowdrake sidekicks Flint and Locke, she really developed into her own character. Lynn Deanna Jones is an obvious Lara Croft satire, but I'm also one of the world's biggest Indiana Jones fans, so I yoinked some elements from him as well. Sheeri I created mostly out of a need to exploit anime fandom... it seems you can't have a cool online comic these days without some anime or Japanese influences, and she's a blatantly deliberate self-mocking attempt to capitalize on that aspect. Grey is the most recent addition to the roster, and it's just cuz aliens are cool. Most of the cast is alien, and that's intentional since I'm trying to put extraordinary individuals into ordinary situations."

== Additional Characters ==
- Pierce - A goth who speaks with a fake Cockney accent. She's a crew member aboard Lynn's ship.
- Six - From the same alien race as Andrah, but only about six inches tall.
- Buaa - An eggplant alien, who, in one comic, falls in love with a real eggplant.
- Mistress Laura - A stripper while alive, she's become a ruler over the land of the dead. She's accompanied by her shadow dragons, Flint and Locke (named as a pun on the word flintlock).
- Vhaldis - A Urusai necromancer who is currently working to regain his full power. A typical "take over the world, laugh like a maniac" sort of guy.
- Ded, Dedd, n Deddy - Ghostly parodies of Ed, Edd n Eddy who served Mistress Laura.
- Gangster Pikachu - Clearly making fun of Pikachu of Pokémon fame, this leader of the "Pokemob" showed up more often in the earlier, humor-based strips. The mobster mouse frequently tries to see to it that Nintendo isn't made fun of too much in the strip, even if he has to make the PCC crew an offer that they can't refuse...

== Basic Chronology ==
- 1992 to 1994 as "Behind the Screens with Dr. Otto": Published in print as a b/w one-panel strip for Game Zero magazine's Comics page (published bi-monthly). A majority of the strips were later colorized in preparation of moving to the WWW at the end of 1994.
- 1995 to 1996 as "The Plastic Valley Report": Published full-color, regularly on the WWW and additionally for six months as part of Game Zero's CD-ROM newsstand edition with a print circulation of 150,000.
- 2000 to current as "The Polymer-City Chronicles": Initially re-launched in b/w on the Game Zero magazine web archive, it lived for a brief stint under the gaming website mpog.com. Next it moved to its own server under the domain polymer-city.com which was subsequently hijacked a year later. Finally the site settled down in mid-2002 at its current home. During this time the strip moved from one-shot gags over to a large story arc, and transitioned into color.
