= Argon Zark! =

- Author(s): Charley Parker
- Website: www.zark.com
- Current status/schedule: Irregularly
- Launch date: June 1995
- Genre(s): Science fiction

Argon Zark! is a webcomic, created by cartoonist and web site designer Charley Parker. The strip, drawn using a graphics tablet and computer graphics software, first appeared in June 1995. A collection, billed as a "Dead Tree Souvenir Edition", was published in December 1997. The strip was last updated in September 2019.

== Synopsis ==
Argon Zark! is about a hacker who has created a new Internet protocol, named "Personal Transport Protocol" or "PTP", which enables the physical transport of people or objects through the Internet. On his first test of the new protocol, he is joined by his "Personal Digital Assistant" Cybert, and a delivery girl named Zeta Fairlight who is accidentally caught in the action when Argon and Cybert enter the computer and the World Wide Web.

== Bibliography ==
=== Books ===
- Parker, Charley (1997). Argon Zark!, Arclight Publishing
- Iuppa, Nicholas V. (1998). Designing Digital Media, page 149 plus CD-ROM content, Focal Press
- Alspach, Jennifer (1998). Photoshop and Illustrator Studio Secrets, pp. 223–229 IDG Books
- McCloud, Scott (2000). Reinventing Comics, pp. 165, 214, Paradox Press
- Withrow, Stephen (2003). Toon Art: The art of Digital Cartooning, pp. 45 118–119, 184 Watson-Guptill
- Hartas. Leo (2004). How to Draw and Sell Digital Cartoons, pp. 17, 60, 72, Barron's Educational Series ISBN 978-0-7641-2662-8

=== Periodicals ===
- Kurtz, Frank (December 1996). "Panels and Frames", Internet Underground

=== Newspapers ===
- Sunday Tech section (August 25, 1996). The Houston Chronicle
- Macklin, William H. (June 5, 1997). "Cyber Hero to the Rescue", The Philadelphia Inquirer, pp. F1, F3, Knight Ridder Wire Services
- Carrington, Penelope M. (June 6, 1997). "Argon's World", Richmond Times-Dispatch, pp. E1, E6-7, E11
