= Sluggy Freelance =

Long-running webcomic by Pete Abrams

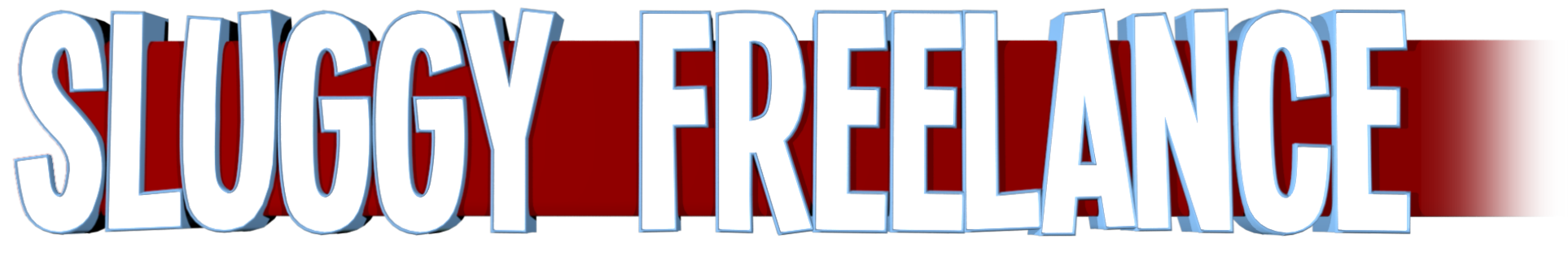
- Sluggy Freelance logo
- Author: Pete Abrams
- Website: Official website
- Current status/schedule: Updates weekdays
- Launch date: August 25, 1997; 29 years ago
- Genre(s): Comedy horror, satire, science fantasy, dramedy

Sluggy Freelance is a long-running webcomic written and drawn by Pete Abrams. It started in 1997 and is one of the oldest successful webcomics. As of 2012, it had hundreds of thousands of readers. Abrams was one of the first comic artists successful enough to make a living from a webcomic.

While the strip began as a gag-a-day-based series in which the three main protagonists (Torg, Riff and Zoë) would stumble from one brief, bizarre, parody-centric adventure to the next, the characters and plotlines gradually became more complex and serious. Some critics have praised the humor of the strip and its use of subject matter not available in newspaper comics, while others have criticized the long and complex stories and continuity.

== Creation ==
Sluggy Freelance started on August 25, 1997. In an interview, creator Pete Abrams said that he had always hoped the strip could become his full-time job, and treated it like a job from the start. According to Abrams, he promoted the comic to friends, at conventions, and in posts on newsgroups, and popularity came from "organic credibility". In the interview, Abrams said that the initial plan was to write the original characters out of the story as new ones were introduced, to keep the strip fresh, but a couple years later he found out he liked the characters so much that he stuck with them.

In its early days, the strip was hosted on Big Panda, but today has its own website.

In a 2007 interview Abrams would not reveal the origins for the name "Sluggy Freelance", instead joking that he couldn't hear the question and that his great-grandfather was named "Sluggy Freelance". According to a 2014 article in Comic Book Resources, the "Mokhadun" storyline provided an in-canon explanation for the title, "which has been a source of consternation for webcomic pundits for nearly two decades". This relates to a god named 'Sluggy', related to main character Bun-Bun. The donor-only blog operated by Abrams mentioned that the web server originally ran slowly (sluggishly).

Abrams draws the strip on card stock and uses Photoshop for lettering and coloring. He intends the comic to end in the late 2020s.

== Premise ==
According to a 1999 review, Sluggy Freelance followed the adventures of Riff, a self-described freelance bum and inventor, and Torg, a web site designer trying to make a living. They are aided, or sometimes hindered, by a Mini Lop rabbit named Bun-bun. Early characters also include their neighbor Zoë, the strip's straight woman, and Dr. Lorna, a parody of talk show psychologist Dr. Laura. A 2002 review described the comic as "telling a complex ongoing story in a punchline-a-day style... His characters, a pack of cheerfully put-upon twentysomethings... frequently fight killer robots and drop into alternate dimensions as Abrams parodies popular film, television, and video games." Writing for CBR, Larry Cruz said in 2014 that the characters "form a sort of Scooby team that encounters ghosts, mad scientists, aliens and holiday mascots on the reg. The comic is epic in nature, yet it's adamant in its refusal to take itself seriously."

While the strip started as a gag-a-day comic, it soon expanded into complex storylines. Abrams said that he felt able to have longer story arcs because readers could catch up with stories through the online archive. As time progressed he wanted to write longer and more involved stories, and in order to tell the story quickly enough, he added more panels to each daily strip.

== Main characters ==
Characters in Sluggy Freelance include:

- Torg: an "everyman" character, Torg is the protagonist in most storylines. He begins as a hapless and lazy freelance web designer, including being fired from a company for absences from work. While impulsive and not so bright, he sometimes comes up with surprising but clever solutions to problems. Despite being a thin young adult, Torg is a highly skilled marksman, and often displays unusual athleticism in dangerous situations, and his fighting skills greatly improved after many years of bizarre adventures (to the point of apparently even impressing Bun-bun). He also has a strong spirit, evident when he easily beat K'Z'K to a pulp in his own mental dimension. He seems to have problems with steady or stable relationships, as most of the women with any romantic designs on Torg have generally found themselves dead, emotionally traumatized, or otherwise not well off. He became somewhat mentally unstable due to Riff and Zoë's supposed deaths in a 2009 storyline.
- Riff: an inventor with a fondness for explosives. Riff is a genius whose creations typically lead to mayhem and destruction. His inventions have been extremely varied (though he has a love for heavy firepower), and often play key roles in plot lines. Among his inventions have been the Dimensional Flux-Agitator (a device used for moving matter between dimensions), a time machine (not Y2K-compatible), and a gigantic mecha-style robot featuring enough firepower for a modern army with an AI cribbed from an old See 'n Say. His biological mother was revealed early in the strip to be Dr. Lorna, a Dr. Laura-esque radio personality whom he blames for ruining his life. Riff usually wears a trench coat and his face is never seen without his sunglasses. Riff is Jewish; he wields a Star of David against vampires and celebrates Hanukkah. According to novelist John Ringo, who corresponded with Pete Abrams while doing a crossover, Riff was originally based on a deceased friend of Abrams' named Paul Kilzer.
- Zoë: the strip's straight woman, Zoë Bean is probably the sanest character, often acting as the voice of reason. She often gets swept up in the group's adventures either entirely by accident or against her will. There has been unspoken romantic tension between Zoë and Torg, Zoë seemed not to be explicitly aware of what feelings she might have for him, while Torg, has thought he is in love with her, but has been unable or unwilling to act on these feelings. In a 2009 storyline, Zoë finally comes to realize that Torg is indeed in love with her. A magical necklace, a gift from Torg, has somehow become attached to Zoë, and now manifests only as a tattoo based on its original shape. The presence of this necklace causes her to be transformed into a camel on the magic word "Shupid" and restored on the word "Kwi". She was presumed to be dead after being transported to another dimension with Riff. However, she was seen alive but in a horrifically burned condition in an alternate dimension with Riff. By clever trickery, Riff managed to restore Zoë to her pre-burned condition. Zoë is half-Korean.
- Bun-bun: talking Mini Lop rabbit who is very mean and carries a switchblade. Bun-bun is manipulative, violent, amoral, easily angered and extremely vengeful. He is rude to all the other members of the group, shows no concern for their feelings, and has made it clear on numerous occasions that he has no interest in helping them, even when their lives were at risk. Though physically a small rabbit, Bun-bun is more powerful than much of the rest of the cast, possessing great strength disproportionate to his size. He has a collection of weapons, his second favorite after the switchblade being a Glock handgun. Most of his origin is unknown: Bun-bun himself has stated that many of his memories prior to meeting Torg are hazy, at best. Bun-bun has had a long-running war with Santa Claus, and once accidentally killed the Easter Bunny and assumed the role for a time. References and parodies of Bun-bun have appeared in other media, such as an AI character based on him in John Ringo's Council Wars series, a vehicle named after him in Ringo's Aldenata series, and references in the card game Munchkin.
- Gwynn: A friend of the main characters who likes to dabble in witchcraft. While sardonic, selfish, often violent, and manipulative, she has proven her loyalty to her friends several times. She and Riff have dated in the past. In storylines around 2007, she came to regard the rest of the cast as not being her friends and has admitted she believes everyone will hurt her at some point, and that is why she may try to hurt them first. Through seeing a psychiatrist, she has come to regard the others as a surrogate family. She has gained an antagonistic attitude towards Torg, caused by her false belief that he hates her. She is a practitioner of black magic with heavy ties to both the Book of E-Ville and the demon K'Z'K. Having been possessed twice by the Voweless, she attempted to drop magic but circumstances keep drawing her back in.
- Kiki: a sweet-natured talking ferret. She is hyperkinetic, has a microscopic attention span, and has a dark past as a former lab animal. She belonged to Sam for a time after Bun-bun took over the lab and released the animals, then came into the care of Riff. Kiki is like a small child in many respects. Even though she can be annoying at times, most of the other characters seem to have a soft spot for her and will help her in times of need. When fed sugar she can move at supersonic speeds, which has been weaponised. Kiki seems particularly fond of Bun-bun, which irritates him.

== Traditions ==
Sluggy Freelance has featured several yearly recurring themes, although many of them have eventually been broken or discontinued due to developments in the overall plot.

In an early 1998 plotline, one of Riff's inventions sent Torg to the "Dimension of Pain." Every Halloween afterwards for several years, a different demon was sent to Earth to try to bring him back, failing in amusing and unexpected ways.

Bun-bun has tried to kill Santa Claus every Christmas, with continuously escalating violence; the fact that Bun-bun became the Easter Bunny early on in the strip merely added spice to the relationship. There was a break in the tradition when Bun-bun was thrown out of time and was not present in 2005, and aside from an attack more inconveniencing than dangerous in 2006 he has not resumed the feud.

Also on almost every Christmas/Hanukkah, Torg and Riff have attempted to continue their own, private tradition of giving each other "a beer every year." Usually they never quite get it right, for a variety of reasons, including being trapped in a mummy's tomb, selling their shoulders for science, and other random occurrences.

Every year on 25 August, the comic features a small animation to commemorate the comic's anniversary, most of which involve Kiki singing karaoke. The Fifth Anniversary, August 25, 2002, fell on a Sunday, which traditionally was reserved for full color extended comics. This comic combined the two themes, presenting a full-color animated comic, which advanced one frame at a time.

In every New Year's Eve storyline, Bun-bun gets drunk on 151 Rum, which results in his being uncharacteristically kind and courteous (such as apologizing to Torg or praising the main cast).

== Other guest strips and crossovers ==
=== Guest strips ===
Abrams invites other well-known webcomic artists to do the strip for a week once or twice a year, while he goes on vacation. A frequent result is a parody of the strip itself, other webcomics, other creative works and/or artists, including Scooby-Doo and Ayn Rand. Clay Yount of Rob and Elliot was guest artist several times prior to taking over Saturday duties. Abrams also has various other artists providing art for Saturdays and Sundays, most recently Stuart Taylor and Lauren Taylor of Chain Bear.

=== Crossovers and references to Sluggy Freelance in webcomics ===
Numerous other webcomics have referenced Sluggy Freelance, and various guest artists on Sluggy Freelance have included their own webcomics' characters in their guest strips, including User Friendly who swapped A.J. for Torg for a week. Gwynn from Sluggy Freelance has appeared in the webcomic General Protection Fault, and Trudy Trueheart, a character from that webcomic, is Gwynn's cousin. The creator of General Protection Fault said that the crossover doubled the readership of his comic overnight. There are several implicit cross-overs with R. K. Milholland's Something Positive, such as a comic where Aubrey was forced to sell her bunny, an aggressive Mini Lop with a love of sharp things, to "Kiki's Petstore". In the webcomic Freefall, two rabbits are shown and the character Helix names them Kevin (presumably after Kevin Dewclaw in Kevin and Kell) and Bun-Bun.

In the game Munchkin by Steve Jackson Games, a monster card for players to fight against has a picture of a switchblade-wielding Bun-Bun. There is a 5 in 6 chance that the monster is a perfectly normal bunny rabbit and a 1 in 6 chance that it is "that" rabbit. Possibly also a reference to the killer rabbit in Monty Python and the Holy Grail. In the expansion called Munchkin Bites there is a monster card called "The Evil" which refers to a horror story in the comic.

Shortly after the birth of Leah Nicole Abrams in the middle of "The Love Potion" storyline, Sluggy Freelance entered a three-week-long side story. The story involved Ki and Fooker of General Protection Fault, Lindesfarne and Ralph of Kevin and Kell, and Bruno and Fiona of Bruno the Bandit attempting to play the roles of Sluggy Freelance characters and find the original cast. Other characters, such as Gav from Nukees, and Trudy from General Protection Fault, made appearances. The non-comic characters from Mystery Science Theater 3000 also appear, in their silhouetted form.

=== References to Sluggy Freelance in other media ===
Science fiction author John Ringo has included references to Sluggy Freelance in his novels. For example, in his Legacy of the Aldenata series, the crew of a massive mobile artillery platform in the third book are depicted as Sluggy fanatics to comedic effect (including naming their vehicle after Bun-Bun and painting a giant picture of Bun-Bun on it). In the fourth book, Hell's Faire, a character is based on a friend of Pete Abrams who was the inspiration for Riff. A section of original Sluggy comics set in the alternate future world of the novels appears in the end of Hell's Faire, and a sampler of Sluggy storylines is included on the CD-ROM bound into this book. Pete possibly returned the favor shortly thereafter by entitling one subchapter "Hell's Unfair." Another possible Sluggy reference is in the short story "Lets Go to Prague" where one character uses the codeword Kizke. This is the common mispronunciation of the demon K'z'k. (The proper pronunciation has no vowels.) Also, the first two novels of Ringo's distant-future Council Wars series have appearances by an irascible, treacherous, switchblade-toting, telemarketer-hating AI in a rabbit-shaped body, created by a long-dead fan of an unnamed 20th-century webcomic.

In S.M. Stirling's Conquistador, one of the characters unleashes a self-destruct sequence with the code phrase "Override B-1 oasis". Override B-1 is a program that causes the Sluggy character Oasis to unleash her own level of destruction.

=== Use in education ===
Sluggy Freelance became a part of the Create a Comic Project.

== Success and critical reaction ==
Abrams was one of the first cartoonists to make a full-time living from webcomics. The Washington Post reported in 2005 that there were only "a dozen or more" cartoonists able to earn a full time living from webcomics, though there were also "thousands" of cartoonists earning some money this way. As of 2005, Sluggy Freelance had more than 100,000 daily readers, and in 2012 it was reported to have "hundreds of thousands" of readers. Shaenon K. Garrity said in a history of webcomics that around 1996–2000, while newspaper-style strips continued to dominate webcomics, "now the winning genre was the ongoing serial adventure strip, usually done with a heavy dollop of geeky comedy", and listed Sluggy Freelance as a prime example. Writing for The Beat, Maggie Vicknair called it one of the oldest and most successful webcomics. Sluggy Freelance was nominated for Best Comic by the Web Cartoonists' Choice Awards in 2001, and was included in a 2007 exhibition by the Museum of Comic and Cartoon Art called "Infinite Canvas: The Art of Webcomics".

Early reviews noted that being published on the internet allowed Sluggy Freelance to use subject matter not allowed or not typical for newspaper comics, including geeky subjects such as Star Trek, The X-Files, Aliens, The Matrix, slasher films and Microsoft, as well as references to alcohol and sex. A 1999 review in MIT's campus newspaper, The Tech, said of the first book printing, "Sluggy Freelance sits comfortably in the top tier of comic strips out there today, and Is it Not Nifty deserves to be on every MIT student’s shelf." An A.V. Club of the fifth book in 2002 by Tasha Robinson called Sluggy Freelance "one of the oldest and best of the ongoing Internet comic strips", and described plots in which the characters are attacked by Satan-spawned kittens and a nanotech-based Y2K bug. Robinson said that Sluggy Freelance had "irrepressible silliness", describing his humor as "absurdist", "geeky", and "left-field", but that the book did have a serious side, building on a previous plot threads and story developments, and said that Sluggy Freelance and other webcomics "collectively offer hope for the future of the comic-strip medium." The Sunday Times described Sluggy Freelance in a 2006 article as "TV buff heaven ... think The Office-style sardonic observations about everyday life set in Buffyverse's universe, with Battlestar Galactica thrown in ... very funny indeed."

Many reviewers have criticized the length and complexity of storylines. In 2006, Eric Burns-White of Websnark called the "Oceans Unmoving" storyline "long, laborious, [and] turgid", and the "Oceans Unmoving II" storyline, which ended in 2006, "mind-numbingly long". He said, "I got pushed as far as I humanly could on the 'why do I read this strip, again' thing, but I'm still here.... there's hope." Writing for AppScout in 2007, writer Whitney Reynolds said that "Sluggy Freelance was better in the 90's, when you didn't have to slog through ten years of continuity and alternate universe and rabbits to figure out what the heck is going on." A reviewer for Sequential Tart in 2008 said, "Sluggy Freelance has such a convoluted interconnected plot line... by God, if I've mastered this universe, I'm in it for the long haul... Some of the Sluggy plots suck, but overall they're great, sometimes brilliant, like 'Ocean's Unmoving,' which got a very mixed reaction, but I loved it." In a 2014 article for Comic Book Resources, reviewer Larry Cruz felt that the mythos of the strip was impossible for a reader to retain, and said, "Marathoning Sluggy Freelance can often feel like a chore, and I admit that I tapped out during the second "Oceans Unmoving" storyline (concluding in 2006), which I understand was the breaking point for many longtime readers." Cruz noted that "Abrams himself is aware of the impenetrable nature of his webcomic" and had been including footnotes with most pages, hyperlinking to previous strips to provide context for recurring characters, locations and storylines.

Cruz also felt that "revisiting Sluggy Freelance [in 2014] is like stepping into a time warp", not just because the site "still looks like it was developed on Geocities and optimized for 14.4k dialup modems", but because one of the first scenes in the contemporary story "was a big-eyed female who resembles an anime girl with her clothes falling off," concluding their review by saying: "Things may change, but Sluggy never changes."

== Collections ==
In addition to being available on the website, Sluggy Freelance has been collected in paperback. At least 21 collections have been published, including:

Trade Paperbacks
| # | Title | Comics Collected | Pages | Publisher |
|---|---|---|---|---|
| 1 | Sluggy Freelance: Is It Not Nifty? | Aug 1997 - Mar 1998 | 160 | Plan 9 Publishing, December 1, 1998 |
| 2 | Sluggy Freelance: Worship the Comic | Mar 1998 - Oct 1998 | 160 | Plan 9 Publishing, June 30, 1999 |
| 3 | Sluggy Freelance: When Holidays Attack! | Oct 1998 - Apr 1999 | 160 | Plan 9 Publishing, December 17, 1999 |
| 4 | Sluggy Freelance: Game Called on Account of Naked Chick | May 1999 - Dec 1999 | 165 | Plan 9 Publishing, September 25, 2000 |
| 5 | Sluggy Freelance: Yippy Skippy, the Evil! | Jan 2000 - Aug 2000 | 152 | Plan 9 Publishing, February 1, 2001 |
| 6 | Sluggy Freelance: The Bug, The Witch, And The Robot | Aug 2000 - Apr 2001 | 180 | Plan 9 Publishing, September 2001 |
| 7 | Sluggy Freelance: A Very Big Bang! | Apr 2001 - Nov 2001 | 128 | Plan 9 Publishing, January 1, 2002 (Available at IndyPlanet) |
| 8 | Sluggy Freelance: Fire and Rain | Nov 2001 to May 2002 | 128 | Plan 9 Publishing, 2003 (Available at IndyPlanet) |
| 9 | Sluggy Freelance: Dangerous Days | May 2002 - Dec 2002 | 128 | Sluggy Freelance, LLC, November 2005 |
| 10 | Sluggy Freelance: Ghosts in the Gastank | Dec 2002 - Jul 2003 | 148 | Available at IndyPlanet |
| 11 | Sluggy Freelance: The Holiday Wars | Jul 2003 - Jan 2004 | 148 | Available at IndyPlanet |
| 12 | Sluggy Freelance: Vampires & Demons | Jan 2004 - Aug 2004 | 124 | Available at IndyPlanet |
| 13 | Sluggy Freelance: Redemption | Sep 2004 - Dec 2004 | 140 | Available at IndyPlanet |
| 14 | Sluggy Freelance: Skullduggery | Dec 2004 - Sep 2005 | 168 | Available at IndyPlanet |
| 15 | Sluggy Freelance: Timeless | Sep 2005 - Mar 2006 | 144 | Available at IndyPlanet |
| 16 | Sluggy Freelance: Phoenix Rising | Mar 2006 - Jan 2007 | 196 | Available at IndyPlanet |
| 17 | Sluggy Freelance: Aylee | Feb 2007 - Jan 2008 | 212 | Available at IndyPlanet |
| 18 | Sluggy Freelance: Rise of the Clutter Monster, and Other Harrowing Tales | Jan 2008 - Sep 2008 | 212 | Available at IndyPlanet |
| | Years Of Yarncraft | Jul 2008 - Sep 2008 | 44 | Available at IndyPlanet |
| 19 | Sluggy Freelance: bROKEN | Sep 2008 - Aug 2009 | 218 | Available at IndyPlanet |
| 20 | Sluggy Freelance: 4U Green - 4U Blue | Aug 2009 - Dec 2010 | 272 | Available at IndyPlanet |
| 21 | Sluggy Freelance: 4U City Red | Jan 2011 - Mar 2012 | 298 | Available at IndyPlanet |
| 22 | Sluggy Freelance: R&D Wars | Mar 2012 - Mar 2013 | 200 | Available at IndyPlanet |

Tomes

- Sluggy Freelance : Born of Nifty : Megatome 01: Books 1–3 Is it Not Nifty / Worship the Comic / When Holidays Attack (2006)
- Sluggy Freelance: Little Evils: MegaTome 02 (Books 4, 5 & 6) (Red Brick Press, September 18, 2007) Includes 25 bonus pages of never-before printed storylines.

== Spinoff games ==
=== Get Nifty ===
In 2005, Blood & Cardstock Games published Get Nifty, a card game based on Sluggy Freelance designed by Rob Balder with illustrations by Abrams. It is a 2–6 player game taking about 40 minutes per game.

=== Button Men expansion ===
In 2001, Cheapass Games published an expansion to their game Button Men of six buttons with Sluggy Freelance characters.

=== Role-playing game ===
According to a post on the Sluggy Freelance forums, a Sluggy Freelance RPG was in development in 2006; it was being written by R. Brent Palmer in consultation with Pete Abrams and was first playtested at Dragon Con later that year.

== Author ==
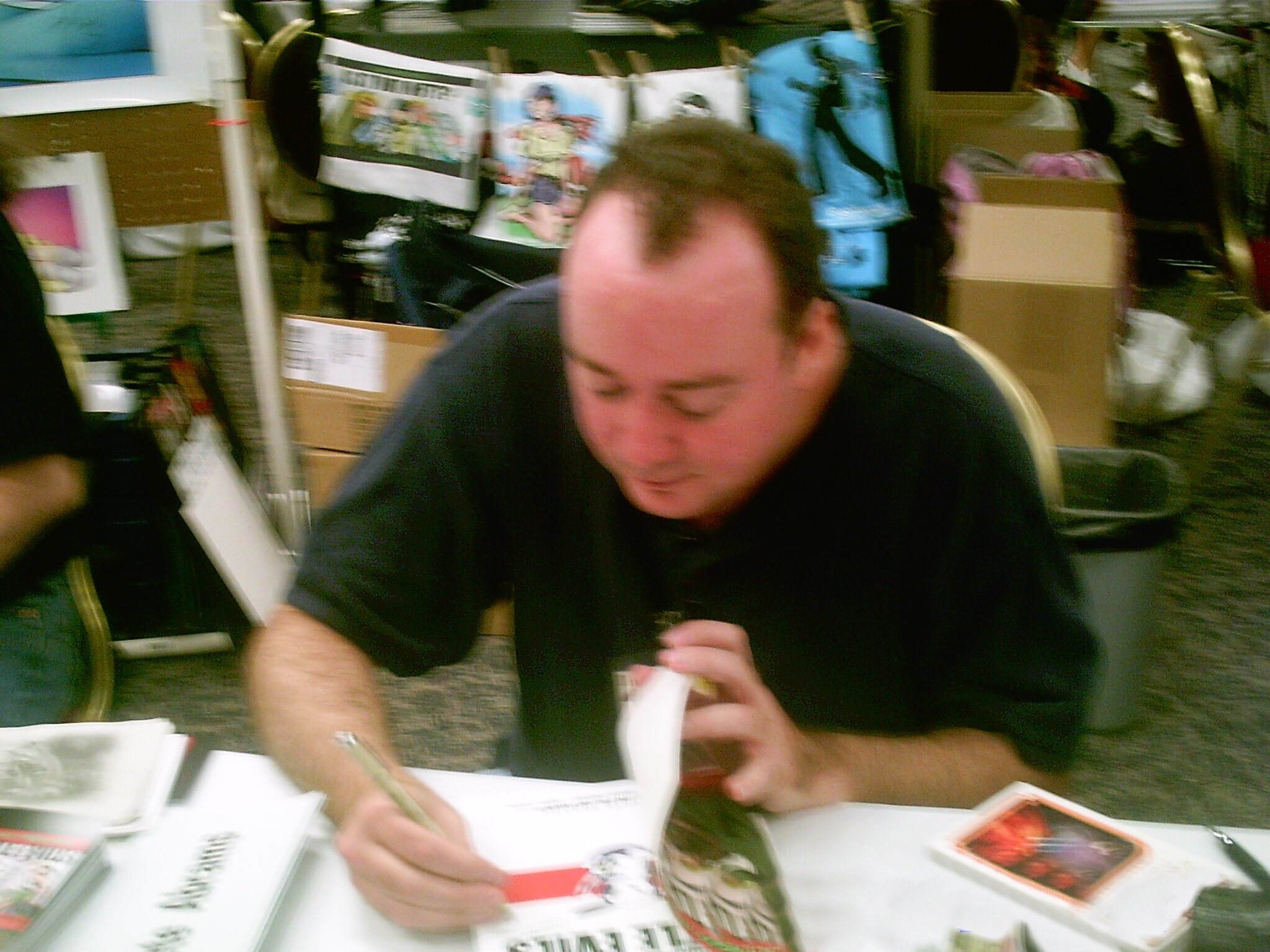
Pete Abrams at Dragon*Con in 2007.

Pete Abrams (born 1970) is the writer and illustrator of Sluggy Freelance. Abrams said in an interview that he went to The Kubert School but was unable to get into the comics industry after school. Instead he got a job as a web designer, and started Sluggy Freelance as a creative outlet. He did not believe the attention span on the Internet was long enough for the kind of elaborate graphic novels he was used to drawing, so instead he went for a daily, quickly drawn strip.

As of 2005, Abrams lived in Denville, New Jersey.
