= Where the Buffalo Roam (webcomic) =

Comic strip by Hans Bjordahl

- Author(s): Hans Bjordahl
- Website: http://www.shadowculture.com/wtbr/
- Current status/schedule: Completed
- Launch date: 1987 (newspaper), 1991 (Usenet), 1993 (Web)
- End date: 1995

Where the Buffalo Roam was a comic strip by Hans Bjordahl that ran from 1987 to 1995. It was published on Usenet starting in 1991, making it one of the first online comic strips. Witches and Stitches was published earlier, in 1985, on CompuServe.

Originally created as a college newspaper strip, it featured subjects associated with college life at the time, with topics like "parking nazis", "shroom patrol" and "alliance for the vertically challenged", as well as computer-related situations.

The main characters were undergrads Zack, Scooby, Hilary and Sharon, and a cat named "Dio".

== History ==
Bjordahl created a comic strip for his high school newsletter in Hawaii, then moved to Boulder in 1987 to attend the University of Colorado. It was there he created Where the Buffalo Roam, "an exploration of life on campus in the 1980s" which ran in the free community newspaper the Colorado Daily starting in 1987. The strip was pulled from the paper in 1991 after editors felt the gimmick "Frontal Nudity Mondays" was sexist.

The strip became a regularly updated Internet comic strip in 1991 when it was scanned and posted daily as GIF and PostScript files on a Usenet group. The strip was available on its own "alt" group: alt.comics.buffalo-roam for a couple of years.

The strip was moved to the Web in 1993, after the advent of the NCSA Mosaic browser made viewing images directly over the Web possible. The Houston Chronicle described it as "a World Wide Web favorite. Bjordahl's best when he's poking fun at the sacred cows of popular culture." It was preceded on the Web by Doctor Fun, a daily single panel cartoon feature that was originally created for print.

Where the Buffalo Roam ran until 1995. A very limited archive remains online, but new material has not been added.

BoulderDaze, a film based on the comic's characters, was released in 1999.

== Other work ==
Hans Bjordahl also wrote the comic strip Cafe Angst which was drawn by artist Holley Irvine and ran daily in The Denver Post in 1994. Bjordahl was also co-creator and contributor to the Mr. Cranky movie review site. He also created the comic strip Bug Bash for Micronews, Microsoft's weekly internal newsletter while a program manager for Microsoft's Outlook e-mail program.
