= New England Webcomics Weekend =

The New England Webcomics Weekend was a webcomics convention first held March 20–22, 2009 in Easthampton, Massachusetts, United States. It was organized by webcomic artists, including Octopus Pie artist Meredith Gran. A second convention occurred November 6–7, 2010. It did not repeat in 2011.

== List of official guests ==
- Joey Comeau and Emily Horne - A Softer World
- Chris Hastings - The Adventures of Dr. McNinja
- Jeph Jacques - Questionable Content
- Scott Kurtz - PvP
- Randy Milholland - Something Positive
- Eric Millikin - Fetus-X
- Ryan North - Dinosaur Comics
- Jon Rosenberg - Goats
- Jeffrey Rowland - Overcompensating
- R. Stevens - Diesel Sweeties
- Bill Barnes & Gene Ambaum - Unshelved
