= The Cats of Copenhagen =

Book by James Joyce

- First edition cover
- Author: James Joyce
- Illustrator: Casey Sorrow
- Language: English
- Genre: Children's fiction
- Publisher: Ithys Press
- Publication date: 2012
- Media type: Print (hardback)
- Pages: 40 pages
- ISBN: 978-0-9570684-1-4

The Cats of Copenhagen is a posthumously published short story written by Irish author James Joyce and illustrated by American artist Casey Sorrow. The story was written on 5 September 1936 in the titular city on a postcard to his grandson Stephen James Joyce. It was published in 2012, by Ithys Press, when Joyce's work entered the public domain in certain jurisdictions.

== Plot ==
The story describes the city of Copenhagen, Denmark, where "things are not as they seem", and is critical of "fat cats" and other authority figures.

== Publication ==
Ithys Press published its fine arts edition of The Cats of Copenhagen in January 2012. This edition features original pen and ink illustrations by Casey Sorrow, letterpress typeset by Michael Caine, and handmade paper marbling and binding of Christopher Rowlatt.

The publication attracted controversy, as the Zürich James Joyce Foundation's Fritz Senn expressed disappointment that The Cats of Copenhagen had been copied from a letter held at the Foundation without consultation or discussion. Writing in Granta, author James Scudamore told of meeting with Stephen James Joyce about potentially ghostwriting his memoir, and quoted him as saying he had never seen the story prior to its publication.

== Print editions ==
Title	Language	Publisher	Publish Date	ISBN	Illustrator
The Cats of Copenhagen	English	Ithys Press	January 2012	9780957068414	Casey Sorrow
The Cats of Copenhagen	English	Simon & Schuster (Scribner)	16 October 2012	9781476708942	Casey Sorrow
I gatti di Copenhagen	Italian	Giunti Editore	24 October 2012	9788809777675	Casey Sorrow
ΟΙ ΓΑΤΕΣ ΤΗΣ ΚΟΠΕΓΧΑΓΗΣ	Greek	Psichogios Publications	30 October 2012	9789604969852	Casey Sorrow
Københavnerkatte	Danish	Gyldendal	November 2012	9788702132953	Casey Sorrow
Mačke Kopenhagena	Croatian	Edicije Božičević	2013	9789536751846	Casey Sorrow
Die Katzen von Kopenhagen	German	Carl Hanser Verlag	July 2013	9783446241596	Wolf Erlbruch
哥本哈根的貓	Chinese	Chein Hsing Publishing	September 2013	9789866798719	Casey Sorrow
Los gatos de Copenhague	Spanish	Editorial Losada	September 2013	9789500399708	Casey Sorrow
De Katten Van Kopenhagen	Dutch	Hoogland & Van Klaveren	October 2013	9789089671394	Wolf Erlbruch
O kočkách a Kodani	Czech	Albatros Media	23 October 2013	9788000033099	Casey Sorrow
Les chats de Copenhague	French	Grasset & Fasquelle	November 2013	9782246801115	Casey Sorrow
החתולים של קופנהגן	Hebrew	Achuzat Bayit Books	March 2019	9789655560695	Inbal Even
