= Finn's Hotel =

Collection of narrative drafts by James Joyce

Deluxe edition

Finn's Hotel is a posthumously published collection of ten short narrative pieces written by Irish author James Joyce. Written in 1923, the works were not published until 2013 by Ithys Press, who claimed the work to be a precursor to Joyce's Finnegans Wake. Critics maintain that the stories are early drafts of the novel that were not intended for publication and that should not have been published as a separate collection.

== Publication ==
Ithys Press published their fine arts edition of Finn's Hotel in June 2013. The edition was arranged with a preface by Danis Rose, an introduction by Seamus Deane, featuring eleven illustrations by Casey Sorrow, and design and letterpress printed by Michael Caine.

The publication attracted controversy as some Joyce scholars labeled the works as drafts, not meant for publication.

In the spring of 2014, James O'Sullivan wrote an article for Genetic Joyce Studies, "Finn’s Hotel and the Joycean Canon", which uses computational stylistics to analyze the text of Finn's Hotel to determine whether the text is merely early drafts or should be part of Joyce's canon. O'Sullivan concluded that "the fragments within Finn’s Hotel are most likely drafts for what became Finnegans Wake" and that statistically "the criticisms of Ithys Press are seemingly upheld."

== Print editions ==
Title	Language	Publisher	Publish Date	ISBN
Finn's Hotel	English	Ithys Press	June 2013	?
Finn's Hotel	Spanish	Editorial Losada	2013	9789500399739
Finn's Hotel	Italian	Gallucci	2013	9788861456525
Το Κονάκι του Φιν	Greek	Psichogios Publications	2014	9786180103366
Finn's Hotel	Portuguese	Companhia das Letras	2014	9788535924558
Finn's Hotel	German	Suhrkamp Verlag	2014	9789536751846
Hotel Finna	Polish	Wydawnictwo WAB	2014	9788328009271
