= Casey Sorrow =

American cartoonist

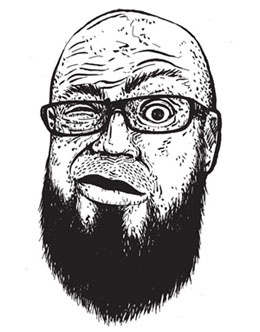
Artist self-portrait, 2011 inked illustration

Casey Sorrow is an American cartoonist, illustrator, and printmaker. His work includes artwork for alternative comics like Fetus-X, illustrations for James Joyce books and newspapers like The New York TImes, and creating the animal rights holiday Monkey Day.

== Fetus-X ==
Sorrow began collaborating with Eric Millikin on the comic Fetus-X in the late 1990s. The comic was published in Michigan State University's The State News in 2000. After the Catholic League protested the comic and then MSU president M. Peter McPherson declared he wanted it banned, the comic strip was removed for being too controversial. During the controversy over the comic, many people protested on both sides of the issue.

Those who were against the comic protested on religious grounds. One said, "As a born-again Christian, I just wanted to notify the writers of “Fetus-X” that the comic strip [is] very offensive. ... I pray that one day you will come to know the power of the cross." Another warned, "Do you remember what happened when they said, 'not even God can sink the Titanic?' There are certain things you just don’t joke about. ... keep your blasphemy to yourself."

Those in favor of the comic said that "I would not hesitate to liken 'Fetus-X' to the Black Sabbath of comic strips ... It is the courage, imagination and talent of both the band and the strip that will set them apart from the other flavors of the week and earn them both places in artistic history." And: "It's frustrating to see the ultimate goal of political correctness gain precedence over the basic principle that Casey Sorrow and Eric Millikin have the artistic right to their own opinions."

The comic was also published in other student newspapers like the University Reporter.

== Monkey Day ==
Sorrow is also known as the creator of December 14's unofficial holiday, Monkey Day. Monkey Day is an international animal rights holiday created and popularized by Sorrow and Eric Millikin in 2000 when they were art students at Michigan State University. They created the holiday as an opportunity to educate the public about monkeys, as a holiday that supports evolution rather than religious themes, and an excuse to throw monkey-themed art shows and costume parties.

== The Cats of Copenhagen ==
In 2012, Sorrow illustrated the first printed edition of James Joyce's The Cats of Copenhagen, where Sorrow's pen and ink hand-drawings were made into clichés typographiques and printed on a rare American-built Vandercook SP 33 proofing press for the first edition. In October 2012, Simon & Schuster published the first U.S. edition through Scribner. As of 2014, Sorrow's illustrations have been featured in 8 different international language editions, including an Italian version published by Psichogios Publications, a Greek version be Giunti Editore, a Danish version by Gyldendal, and a Chinese version by Chein Hsing Publishing. American fashion magazine Vogue described The Cats of Copenhagen as "charmingly illustrated" and a perfect gift for anarchists.

== Finn's Hotel ==
In 2013, Sorrow's illustrations were again featured in first printing of a James Joyce book, Finn's Hotel published by Ithys Press. Sorrow's illustrations are also featured in the international editions in Spanish by Editorial Losada, Italian by Gallucci, Greek by Psichogios Publications, Portuguese by Compahnia das Letras, and German by Suhrkamp Verlag. The illustrations for Finn's Hotel have been described as fun and relevant with a child's naivety.

== Bestiary of Fantastic Creatures ==
In January 2014, Sorrow successfully funded a Kickstarter for an Old School Renaissance (OSR)-style role-playing game bestiary of monsters, "Bestiary of Fantastic Creatures Volume 1: Bizarre Monsters", written and illustrated by Sorrow. The book is described by Sorrow's publishing house, Bull Cock Press, as "a small collection of uniquely illustrated creatures produced to be compatible with the format of traditional table-top role-playing games playable with paper and pencil". It was released to the general public in June 2014, in both a physical and PDF format. Reviews describe the bestiary as "awesomely illustrated" with creatures that "feel fun, and look epic", "an old school monster manual from the times when monsters still were imaginative and the art was personal and cool", and a little volume of strange monsters that not only is "Fiend Folio-good, it's Fiend Factory good".

== Odd Nodd Art Supply ==
In 2019 Sorrow opened Odd Nodd Art Supply with partner Whitney Sorrow, an art supply store located in the REO Town district of Lansing, Michigan. In October of 2020, Odd Nodd was relocated to Old Town, Lansing, Michigan after being "able to persevere in spite of the coronavirus pandemic thanks to support from its dedicated clientele" describing the COVID-19 pandemic experience as “the worst thing I could possibly imagine for the first year of business.” In summer 2025, Odd Nodd Art Supply was vandalized with "racist and homophobic remarks, as well as Nazi symbols." Lansing Police investigated the vandalism as hate crimes.

== Other works ==
Sorrow's illustrations have appeared in publications like The New York Times.

Sorrow attended art school at Michigan State University, where his artwork often focused on screen prints of flaming skulls.
