= The State News =

Student newspaper of Michigan State University

- Type: Student newspaper
- Format: Tabloid
- Owner: Independent
- Founded: 1909
- Headquarters: East Lansing, Michigan
- Website: statenews.com

The State News is the student newspaper of Michigan State University in East Lansing, Michigan. It is supported by a combination of advertising revenue and a refundable tax ($7.50 in 2018) that students pay at each semester's matriculation. Though The State News is supported by a student tax, the faculty and administration do not interfere in the paper's content. The State News is governed by a Board of Directors, which comprises journalism professionals, faculty and students. In 2010, the Princeton Review ranked The State News as the #8 best college newspaper in the country. And in 2015, the Society of Professional Journalists (SPJ) named TSN as the nation's best daily college newspaper for 2014 and they awarded TSN the Eugene S. Pulliam First Amendment Award in 2025.

== History ==
The State News traces its roots to March 10, 1909. It was first dubbed The Holcad, chosen by the president of the then-Michigan Agricultural College. Holcad was the name of a ship that carried news from seaport to seaport in ancient Greece. The newspaper was seen as a way for students to defend themselves against charges of hooliganism by the Lansing press.

In 1925, the newspaper changed its name to the Michigan State News. Eventually, this got clipped to The State News. The paper was overseen by a university-run publications board.

In 1971, the newspaper was spun off from the university into a nonprofit corporation, State News Inc., governed by its own board of directors. The move was designed to protect the student publication from interference by university administrators who might disagree with its content. Its incorporation also protected the university from liability of anything published in The State News. The newspaper's masthead references this, referring to the publication as "Michigan State University's Independent Voice."

In August 2005, The State News moved its offices from the Student Services Building, where it had resided since the building's opening in 1957, to an off-campus location at 435 E. Grand River Ave. Prior to its location at the Student Services Building, the newspaper had its offices in the MSU Union.

In August 2014, the newspaper switched from a broadsheet to a tabloid format, and in April 2015 it ceased publishing a print edition each weekday during the school year, eventually shifting to the current biweekly print format.

== Controversy and criticism ==
On election day, 1948, The State News, going to press at 7 a.m., became the only morning daily to place Harry S. Truman in the lead for president.

In June 1950, the first issue of the summer edition of The State News carried an editorial critical of the Michigan Department of the American Legion's Boy's State program held on the Michigan State College campus. Several days later, June 25, North Korea invaded South Korea initiating the Korean War. The following Monday the state American Legion held its summer encampment and adopted a resolution calling for the suspension of The State News and the expelling of its student editor, Ron M. Linton. Later that week, Michigan State suspended further summer publication of the paper but declined to expel its editor. The school did, however, announce the appointment of a full-time college employee, William McIlrath, as director of the publication with authority over the paper's content. It was later learned that the school had already planned this action but used this incident as a rationale. This culminated a period of six years—since the end of World War II—of increasing irritation of the school's administration by the independent attitude of the student journalists. Returning veterans were a significant portion of the paper's staff and, being several years older than students enrolled directly from high school and matured by war, they tended to exercise a more critical attitude toward campus events. This led to a series of articles and editorials about the difficulty had by African-American male students in getting haircuts, including the refusal of the Union's barber shop to service African-Americans. It also published a series critical of the school's plan to require male cooperative residences to hire "house mothers"; ultimately, the coops were exempted, but fraternities were not. The State News, to the administration's consternation, exposed the administration's efforts to block unionization of dining room and school service employees.

When the local Congressman demanded in 1950 that Michigan State remove left-leaning economist Paul Douglas (later U.S. Senator from Illinois) from its lecture series, the paper fought back in a series of editorials that resulted in the Congressman turning tail. The State News was the first U.S. daily newspaper, commercial or student, to editorially criticize then-U.S. Senator Joseph McCarthy (R-WI) for his sweeping charges without proof of communist activities by a number of citizens.

In November 1965, four State News editors resigned over the faculty adviser's and the lead editor's decision to spike a story involving Paul Schiff, who claimed he was denied re-admission to MSU for his political views.

Internal controversies include a group of junior editors dissatisfied with the editor-in-chief starting a weekly newspaper, Campus Observer, in 1968. The following year, the managing editor took over the editorial reins in response to staff grumbling.

In April 1977, a one-day newsroom staff walkout followed the board's appointment of the next top editor when the staff's recommendation was not picked.

In 2000, The State News published the alternative comic strip Fetus-X by artists Eric Millikin and Casey Sorrow. After protests from the Catholic League, and then MSU president M. Peter McPherson declaring he wanted the artists banned, The State News fired artists Eric Millikin and Casey Sorrow.

In 2003, an advertisement printed in the State News showed Palestinians celebrating in the street while Israelis lit candles and prayed. The advertisement's caption claimed that these were the reactions to the 9/11 terrorist attacks. Pro-Palestinian groups protested outside the MSU Student Services building and demanded that their student fees be refunded.

On Veterans Day, 2005, editorial cartoonist Mike Ramsey drew a piece that showed a World War II soldier who liberated concentration camps conversing with a modern-day soldier who was shown holding a torture device. In response, Young Americans for Freedom and the College Republicans picketed the offices of The State News and called for Ramsey's dismissal. Ramsey was not fired.

In 2008, the Michigan Supreme Court heard arguments regarding The State News' lawsuit against MSU over Freedom of Information Act issues.

The State News received criticism in 2010 for replacing some of its comics with games/puzzles, including new additions of a giant crossword, Octo, Word Finder and Pathem puzzles. In 2010 the State News published Crosswords, Pathem puzzles, Sudoku, Octo, Wordplay and Word Search puzzles. As of 2012 The State News continues to support publishing puzzles and games.

In 2018, The State News received national attention for an editorial demanding the resignation of MSU President Lou Anna K. Simon amid fallout from the Larry Nassar sex assault scandal. Simon quit shortly thereafter.

In September 2025, the Society of Professional Journalists Foundation awarded TSN the Eugene S. Pulliam First Amendment Award "for its investigative series “Inside the Nassar Documents,” which covers the university’s handling of the Larry Nassar sexual abuse scandal."

== Journalistic opportunity ==
Many of the paper's staffers have gone on to professional internships and jobs at the nation's largest newspapers. Alumni of The State News work for news organizations around the world.

The newspaper has won the Associated Collegiate Press' Pacemaker award 18 times (in 1963, 1966, 1967, 1970, 1986, 1990, 1992, 1994, 1995, 1998, 2003, 2006, 2008, 2009, 2020, and 2021 for print; 2014 and 2018 for online). The award is considered one of college journalism's top prizes. It won in 2003 for coverage of the U.S. invasion of Iraq and a campus riot later in the spring of that year. The State News was also a print Pacemaker finalist in 1987, 2010, 2011, 2017 and 2018 and an online Pacemaker finalist in 2005, 2009 and 2017.

The Society of Professional Journalists ranked The State News among the nation's best college daily in 2014, and among the top three in 2007 and 2011.

Reporters often travel to cover news, especially to out-of-state sporting events, such as the 2009 presidential inauguration, the 2012 and 2016 Democratic and Republican national conventions, the 2014 Rose Bowl Game and 2019 men's Final Four. Clinics and professional development opportunities are provided. A staff photographer at the paper has been named Michigan's College Photographer of the Year by the Michigan Press Photographers' Association each year for most of the last decade.

Alumni also have won Pulitzer Prizes, including M.L. Elrick who was part of the Detroit Free Press staff that won the journalism award in April 2009 for their coverage of the texting message scandal of Detroit Mayor Kwame Kilpatrick. Elrick wrote for the State News in 1987-88. Jim Mitzelfeld won in 1994 for beat reporting at The Detroit News, 11 years after serving as editor-in-chief.

Investigative work by Charles Robinson at Yahoo! Sports led to the revocation of USC football player Reggie Bush's 2005 Heisman Trophy. Robinson later uncovered millions of dollars in illegal compensation to several dozen football players at the University of Miami (Fla.).

Other recent alums of note include Jemele Hill, former co-host of "SportsCenter" on ESPN who now writes for The Atlantic; Steve Eder, a presidential campaign reporter for The New York Times; and John Hudson, who covers national security for the Washington Post.

== Publishing and distribution ==
The State News has a readership of more than 65,000 students, faculty, staff and residents of the cities surrounding the university. Free copies of the paper are available online or at green-colored newsstands around campus and the city. The State News prints 7,000 copies of the paper every other Tuesday during the Fall and Spring semesters. The print edition is not published on weekends, holidays, the summer semester or semester breaks, though news is constantly updated at statenews.com (which has garnered more than 5 million page views annually) and via social media (the State News' Twitter feeds have more than 40,000 followers). In 2012, The State News began marketing its Gryphon content management system to other college newspapers under the moniker of SNworks (www.getsnworks.com). Gryphon's successor CMS, called CEO, is now being used by more than 50 student-run papers at North Carolina, Duke, Maryland, Indiana, Virginia, Pennsylvania, Arizona, South Carolina, New Mexico, Eastern Michigan, Grand Valley State, UM-Flint, Otterbein and other universities, in addition to The State News itself.

== Hall of Fame ==
In 2006, the State News Alumni Association honored the first 15 inductees to its State News Hall of Fame. 31 additional names have been added through 2009. The first class included:

- A.A. Applegate, MSU journalism chairman and mentor to students at The State News, 1936–1955;
- Len Barnes, news staff and editor, 1938–1942, who along with Sheldon Moyer, is credited with taking The State News from a three-day-a-week paper to a five-day-a-week paper featuring a wire service;
- Lou Berman, general manager, 1961–1972, who is credited with saving the newspaper from potential ruin;
- Ben Burns, reporter and editor, 1958–1963, who is a former executive editor of The Detroit News and head of the journalism program at Wayne State University;
- Phil Frank, cartoonist, 1961–1965, who went on to publish the strip Farley in the San Francisco Chronicle;
- Carole Leigh Hutton, reporter and editor, 1975–1978, who helped hold The State News together during a staff walkout in the 1970s and the first female publisher and editor of the Detroit Free Press;
- Charles P. “Lash” Larrowe, faculty columnist, 1971–1989, who was an economics professor emeritus famous for his satirical column;
- Ron Linton, night editor and editor, 1947–1950, who was a senior consultant for the Carmen Group, served in high-level positions in Congress, worked on John F. Kennedy’s 1960 presidential campaign and was named director of Economic Utilization Policy at the Department of Defense;
- Dick Milliman, news staff, 1946–1950; board member, 1978–1985, 1991–1996, 2002–present, who is the founder of Milliman Communications, which has published more than 25 community newspapers in Michigan.
- Jim Mitzelfeld, editor in chief, 1982–83, who won the Pulitzer Prize in 1994 as a reporter for The Detroit News and is now an attorney for the U.S. Justice Department
- Jim Quello, editor, 1935, who served on the Federal Communications Commission for more than 23 years, including 11 months as interim chairman in 1993;
- Dave Rood, news staff, 1946–1950, who in 1977 as editor of The Escanaba Daily Press was asked by his paper’s corporate publisher to run two stories about President Jimmy Carter. When Rood refused, saying the stories were shoddy journalism, he was fired. His stand for journalistic principles earned him national attention and a place in the Michigan Journalism Hall of Fame;
- Jim Spaniolo, editor in chief, 1967–68, a former dean of the College of Communication Arts and Sciences who in 2003 was named president of the University of Texas at Arlington;
- James P. Sterba, news staffer, 1960s, a foreign correspondent, war correspondent and national correspondent for three decades at The New York Times and The Wall Street Journal. He is currently a senior correspondent in the New York bureau of The Wall Street Journal;
- Jerry terHorst, reporter and night editor, 1941–43, who served as President Gerald Ford's press secretary but resigned one month later to protest the pardon of Richard Nixon.

== Notable journalists ==
- Jack Berry, summer editor during 1955 and sports editor for the 1955–56 semester.
- Eric Millikin, artist in 2000
- Casey Sorrow, artist in 2000
