= Chicagoland Golf =

Regional golf newspaper

- Editor: Will Wagner
- Publisher: Val Russell (Chicagoland Golf Media Inc.)
- Founded: 2010
- Country: United States
- Language: English
- Website: http://www.chicagolandgolf.net

Chicagoland Golf is an independent regional golf newspaper serving the public golfers in Northern Illinois, Southeast Wisconsin and Northeast Indiana since 1989, when it was founded by the journalist Phil Kosin, who died in 2009.

Chicagoland Golf is published in the United States 7 times per year by Chicagoland Golf Media, Inc. and covers recreational/amateur golf from Juniors, High School, College and Professional local golf. Distribution is through golf courses and golf retailers and is complimentary. It appears once in March/April, May, June, July, August, September and Fall/October.

Val Russell relaunched the paper as "Chicago Area Golf" in the spring of 2010, publishing six issues in 2010 and seven issues, as shown above, each year since. Val Russell is a nationally recognized magazine Audience Development expert and had his own consulting firm for more than 10 years named "Russell Consulting, Inc." He has worked for several publishers over his more than 40-year career including 17 years with the Audit Bureau of Circulations Now AAM.

Renamed Chicagoland Golf in the Spring of 2013 under the publishing company name of "Chicagoland Golf Media, Inc." established in May 2010.

== Notable contributors ==
- Jack Berry, freelance golf writer
