= Illinois Women's Open =

Golf tournament

The Illinois Women's Open is a three-day, 54-hole state championship of golf administered by the Chicagoland Golf Publishing Company of Naperville, Illinois, and the non-profit Chicago Friends of Golf.

The tournament, founded in 1995 by Chicagoland Golf editor and publisher Phil Kosin, is open to female-at-birth professionals and amateurs age 17 and over who reside within the states of Illinois, Michigan, Indiana, Kentucky, Missouri, Iowa, Minnesota and Wisconsin. Special age and residency exemptions are also considered.

The traditional dates of the Illinois Women's Open are the Thursday, Friday and Saturday immediately following the week of the British Open in late July. The IWO championship field is limited to the top 84 players, and a qualifying round to determine the final field is scheduled if needed. The event's home course is the upland links-style Mistwood Golf Club in Romeoville, Illinois, designed by Ray Hearn.

Each year's champion has her name added to the Elaine Rosenthal Memorial Trophy, which honors one of Chicago's and the nation's early women's golf pioneers. Rosenthal played in many championships in the late 1910s through the mid-1930s, representing the Chicago area and playing out of Ravisloe Country Club in Homewood, Illinois. She volunteered her services as part of "The Dixie Kids" a foursome of talented teenage golfers who barnstormed the United States in 1917–18 playing exhibition matches. Those charity matches marked the first time in the history of golf that spectators paid for tickets to watch a golf event. In this case, the money raised went to the American Red Cross to buy medical supplies for use on the battlefields of Europe. Equally remarkable are the identities of the four teens: Rosenthal and Alexa Stirling were the women; Perry Adair and Bobby Jones were the men.

== Tournament hosts ==
- 1995–1998 Odyssey Golf Course, Tinley Park, Illinois
- 1999–2021 Mistwood Golf Club, Romeoville, Illinois

== Winners ==
Year	Champion	Winning score	Low amateur	Low professional
2021	Tristyn Nowlin	208 (−8)	Crystal Wang 212 (−4)	
2020	Canceled			
2019	Jessica Porvasnik	211 (−5)	Monica Kaho Matsubara 212 (−4)	
2018	Hannah Kim	200 (−16)	Tristyn Nowlin 206 (−10)	
2017	Alexandra Farnsworth (a)	208 (−8)		Samantha Postillion 211 (−5); Vivian Tsui 211 (−5)
2016	Stephanie Miller (a)	207 (−9)		Embur Schuldt
2015	Madasyn Petterson (a)	208 (−8)		Chelsea Harris 213 (−3)
2014	Emily Collins (Note: Played on Symetra Tour from 2015 to 2019.)	212 (−4)		
2013	Elise Swartout	216 (E)^{P}		
2012	Samantha Troyanovich (a)	216 (E)		
2011	Jenna Pearson	216 (E)		
2010	Allison Fouch	217 (+1)	Katherine Hepler	
2009	Aimee Neff (a)	209 (−7)		Brittany Johnston 212 (−4)
2008	Aimee Neff (a) (Note: For the first time, the IWO received more entries than spots in the field (96) and held its first qualifier, with 18 players going for 9 spots. Neff in round two shot 7-under 65 at Mistwood, a course women's record (men's record 64) and IWO record.)	208 (−8)		Seul Ki Park 214 (−2)
2007	Nicole Schachner (a) (Note: The 2007 Illinois Women's Open ended with a state-record 10-hole playoff. At the end of regulation, amateur Nicole Schachner was tied with professional Jenna Pearson at 1-under 215 (Pearson missed a 15-foot eagle putt on the final hole of regulation for an outright one-stroke victory.) After the duo played a four-hole, aggregate-score playoff over holes 1–2–3–3 and were still tied, the format reverted to sudden-death on Mistwood's 528-yard par-5 third hole. The twosome played the hole five more times with the same result as the first two times through during the four-hole playoff – seven straight two-putt pars. Finally on the 10th hole of the playoff and sixth of sudden death, Schachner two putted from 13 feet and Pearson missed a 7-footer to extend the playoff. Also notable is both the first and second rounds began with shotgun starts for the first time in tournament history – necessitated by the presence of severe thunderstorms and cloud-to-ground lightning in the area.)	215 (−1)^{P}		Jenna Pearson 215 (−1)
2006	Jenna Pearson (a)	208 (−8)		Carolyn Barnett-Howe 213 (−3)
2005	Annika Welander (a) (Note: Annika Wellander of Winnetka became the youngest IWO champion when she won three days past her 19th birthday. She held off a fierce back-nine charge from 20-year LPGA Tour veteran Allison Finney (also a Winnetka native) to win the title by one stroke. Both Welander and Finney's 54-hole scores broke course and tournament records.)	207 (−9)		Allison Finney 208 (−8)
2004	Sarah Johnston (Note: Sarah Johnston played the LPGA Tour under her married name of Sarah Lynn Sargent.)	212 (−4)	Noriko Nakazaki 217 (+1)	
2003	Nicole Jeray	212 (−4)	Alexis Wooster 219 (+3)	
2002	Maria Long	217 (−1)	Rebecca Halpern 222 (+6); Sarah Pesavento 222 (+6)	
2001	Emily Gilley (a)	223 (+7)		Dagne Root 229 (+13)
2000	Emily Gilley (a)	217 (+1)		Jennifer Broggi 219 (+3)
1999	Kerry Postillion (a)	214 (−2)		Margie Arnold 216 (E)
1998	Nicole Jeray	211 (−5)	Kerry Postillion 215 (−1)	
1997	Kerry Postillion (a) (Note: In 1997 the golf course was blasted with a 110-degree heat index and tropical humidity for the final round. Amateur Kerry Postillion, the only player in the field who eschewed use of a roofed power cart, set an IWO record when with eight holes remaining, owned a whopping nine-shot lead over her nearest chaser. Her lead quickly disappeared when she began suffering from heat exhaustion; she and runner-up Diane Daugherty ended in a tie after 54 holes. However, Postillion won a three-hole, aggregate-score playoff with a one-over-par 12 to Daugherty's 13.)	218 (+2)^{P}		Diane Daugherty 218 (+2)
1996	Kerry Postillion (a) (Note: The original July 17–19, 1996 Illinois Women's Open was washed out when 16-inch rains flooded the Chicago area. The golf course, built partially on a flood plain, had over five feet of water on seven holes. The IWO was rescheduled for August 14, 15 and 17.)	219 (+3)		Margie Arnold 227 (+11)
1995	Diane Daugherty (Note: The inaugural 1995 Illinois Women's Open (IWO) was shortened to 36 holes due to cloud-to-ground lightning and torrential rain during the first round. None of the groups had completed nine holes, so the entire round was wiped out.)	139 (−5)	Kristin Milligan 146 (+2)	

- a – denotes amateur
- P – playoff
- Source: Chicagoland Golf Publishing Co., Phil Kosin and Joanne Miller
