= Ravisloe Country Club =

- Location: 18231 Park Ave, Homewood, Illinois
- Coordinates: 41°33′42.55″N 87°40′23.27″W
- Built: 1901
- Architect: George Nimmons
- Architectural style: Spanish Mission
- NRHP reference No.: SG100006865
- Added to NRHP: 2021-09-01

Ravisloe Country Club is a public golf course and wedding venue located in Homewood, Illinois.

== History ==
=== 20th century ===
The country club was established in 1901 by mostly Jewish members of Chicago’s Standard Club, on the site of the Briggs farm, only after the first property choice belonging to a Dutchman named Ravisloot. The membership decided on Ravislow, eventually settling on the name Ravisloe.

The original golf course, designed by James Foulis and Theodore Moreau in 1901, as a 9-hole course. An additional 55 acres were purchased and 9 more holes were designed and overseen by William Watson from 1910 to 1913. Donald Ross supervised a renovation, carried out from over the span of years 1917–19. Updates continued until 1924.

In 1917, the Spanish Mission styled clubhouse was designed by George Nimmons, the same architect behind Olympia Fields’ clubhouse.

Ravisloe operated as a Jewish private country club in the early 20th century. Illinois had the second-highest number of Jewish country clubs, mostly in the Chicago metropolitan era. Due to antisemitism, many Jewish people were locked out of cultural institutions like country clubs so they created their own. Early members of Ravisloe tended to be German Jews.

=== 21st century ===
In 2001, club membership commissioned David Esler to restore the course features in the same style as Donald Ross.

In late 2008, Ravisloe closed due to financial concerns and declining membership. In February 2009, the club was sold to Dr. Claude Gendreau, a veterinary surgeon, who reopened it to the public.

The club was listed on the National Register of Historic Places on September 1, 2021.

In 2025 Curtis White defeated Hendrik Esche by 14 strokes in the first annual Chicagoland Strokers Union "Stroke Off".

== Notable golfers ==
One of the early pioneers in women's golf was Elaine Rosenthal, who played at Ravisloe. She has a trophy named after her, which is presented to winners of the Illinois Women's Open. She was inducted to the Illinois Golf Hall Of Fame in 1995.

In 1913, Harry Vardon and Edward Ray won a match 3 and 2 against Chick Evans and Warren Wood.

In 1916, Chick Evans won the US Open and the US Amateur; he won the US Amateur again in 1920. On June 8, 1918, Evans and Wood teamed up again to play Jerome Travers and John Anderson in a four ball match for the Red Cross at Ravisloe.

Other notable members include:

- Julius Rosenwald, head of Sears Roebuck
- Max Adler
- Judge Julian W. Mack
- Salmon O. Levinson
- Morris Fishbein
- Milton Reynolds, inventor of the ballpoint pen
- Philip M. Klutznick
