= Eric Millikin =

American artist

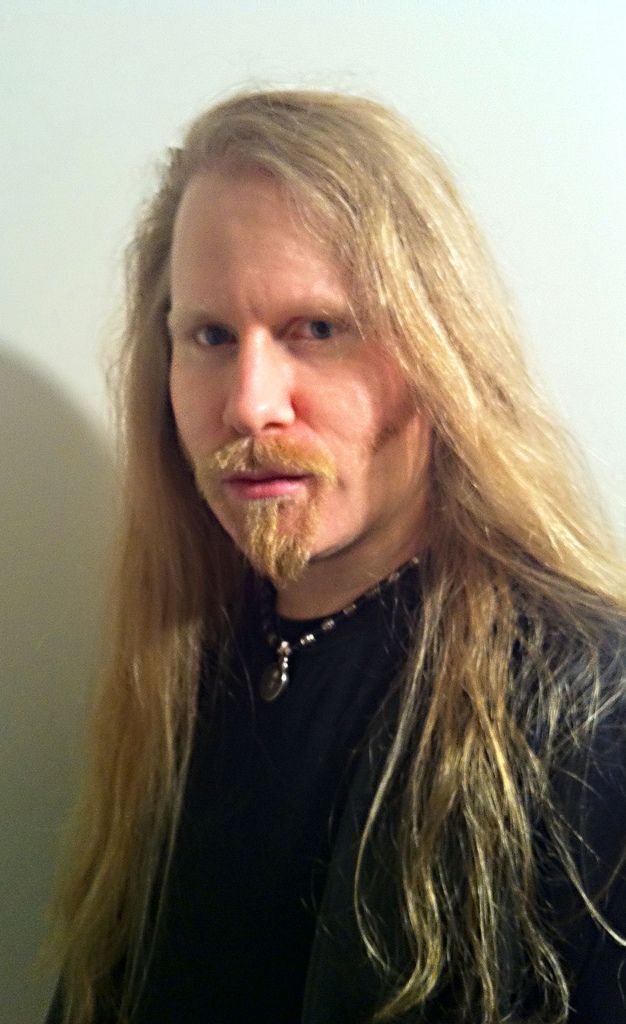
- Millikin
- Education: Michigan State University Honors College; VCU School of the Arts (MFA)
- Known for: Artificial intelligence art, augmented and virtual reality art, conceptual art, Internet art, performance art, poetry, video art
- Website: http://www.ericmillikin.com

Eric Millikin is an American artist and activist based in Detroit, Michigan, and Richmond, Virginia. His work includes political, romantic, occult, horror and black comedy themes, on topics like animal rights, endangered species, economic inequality, and racial and gender politics. His work often referencing his ancestors executed for witchcraft and his work dissecting human cadavers.

He began creating internet art and artificial intelligence art in the 1980s, and also creates augmented and virtual reality art, conceptual art, performance art, poetry, video art, and webcomics.

== Early life and education ==
Millikin is a descendant of Mary Eastey, who was executed for witchcraft during the Salem Witch Trials.

He began drawing horror art by age one-and-a-half, and by second grade, he was making teachers profane birthday cards showing his school burning down. Millikin has been creating animated horror films using artificial intelligence animation since the 1980s, began posting art on the internet using CompuServe in the early 1980s, and began publishing on the World Wide Web in the early 1990s.

Millikin attended art school at Michigan State University in their Honors College. He paid his way through school by working in the school's human anatomy lab as an embalmer and dissectionist of human cadavers. While at art school, Millikin was homeless and lived in a car. He earned a Master of Fine Arts at Virginia Commonwealth University School of the Arts (VCU Arts) in 2021. Millikin teaches 3D Computer Art, Creative Code & Electronics, Augmented Reality, and Video Projection Mapping in the Department of Kinetic Imaging at VCU Arts.

== Notable artworks ==
Millikin's art often includes self-portraits as well as portraits of celebrities and political figures. His work often incorporates mixed media and found objects, such as packages of candy, paper currency, and spiders. Millikin's works range from those made almost completely of text (including calligraphy, typography, anagrams, ambigrams, free verse, and cut-up technique poetry) to those that are optical illusions or completely abstract.

- Monkey Day: An international animal rights holiday. Monkey Day (celebrated December 14) was created and popularized by Millikin and Casey Sorrow in 2000 as an opportunity to educate the public about monkeys, as a holiday that supports evolution rather than religious themes, and an excuse to throw monkey-themed art shows and costume parties. Millikin and Sorrow were art students at Michigan State University at the time. For Monkey Day 2012, USA Weekend published Millikin's The 12 Stars of Monkey Day, a series of paintings that were "in part inspired by the many pioneering space monkeys who rode into the stars on rockets, leading the way for human space flight." For Monkey Day 2013, Millikin created a mail art series where he mailed Monkey Day cards to strangers, including Koko the sign-language gorilla and President Barack Obama. In 2014, Millikin debuted a series of monkey portraits using 3D film techniques.
  Eric Millikin with "Year of the Monkey," part of his "Danger Beasts" series
- Danger Beasts: Since 2016, Millikin has created the Danger Beast series of street art portraits of endangered animals created out of endangered plants, including a portrait of Harambe the gorilla made from Venus flytraps. The murals are created with Venus flytraps from Millikin's “bio art breeding program and tissue culture lab.”
- Made of Money: A series of portraits of historical figures who died in poverty, created from cut up paper currency woven together. Portraits in the series have included Nikola Tesla, Hedy Lamarr, Joe Louis, Vincent Van Gogh, and Edgar Allan Poe. Millikin created the portraits as a statement on economic inequality, as a reminder "that our best people aren't always rewarded with wealth, and that our wealthiest people aren't always our best." As part of the ArtPrize festival in 2017, Millikin created an artist's book of the series and installed it inside one of the small PO Boxes at the local Post Office, as a critique of the large scale pieces that typically dominate the festival. Since the ArtPrize festival was created by the wealthy family of then President Donald Trump's first Education Secretary Betsy DeVos, the installation was widely seen as an attack on the greed and unearned wealth of DeVos and Trump.
- The Birth of a Vampire Nation: A 2019 artificial intelligence horror film created with AI trained on the films The Birth of a Nation and Nosferatu: A Symphony of Horror, and videos of human blood cells and stars. The soundtrack is composed with AI trained on human heartbeats and radio waves from outer space. The film "explores the use of fear in racial and gender politics as well as in popular media."
- CHARYBDIS-3: A spiraling video of infinite duration, created with artificial intelligence and facial recognition trained on endangered plants and animals, and projected on to a waterfall in Richmond, Virginia, in 2021. The project's name comes from the sea monster Charybdis from Greek mythology. The endangered species referenced in the video are species whose fates have been profoundly impacted by global climate change.
- Cyborgs for Rebellion: A 2022 art installation of outdoor video projections in the woods, projecting on the trees of Bryan Park in Richmond, Virginia, where the slave uprising Gabriel’s Rebellion was planned in 1800. The video system projects “an infinitely rotating series of poetry reading, three dimensional portraits” created with artificial intelligence and 3D modeling. The portraits were created with an AI system Millikin created based on "slave rebellion instigators" like Gabriel (“Prosser”), Nat Turner, and John Brown, along with "robots from America’s most critically acclaimed and top-grossing science fiction films" including Metropolis, Blade Runner, and The Terminator.
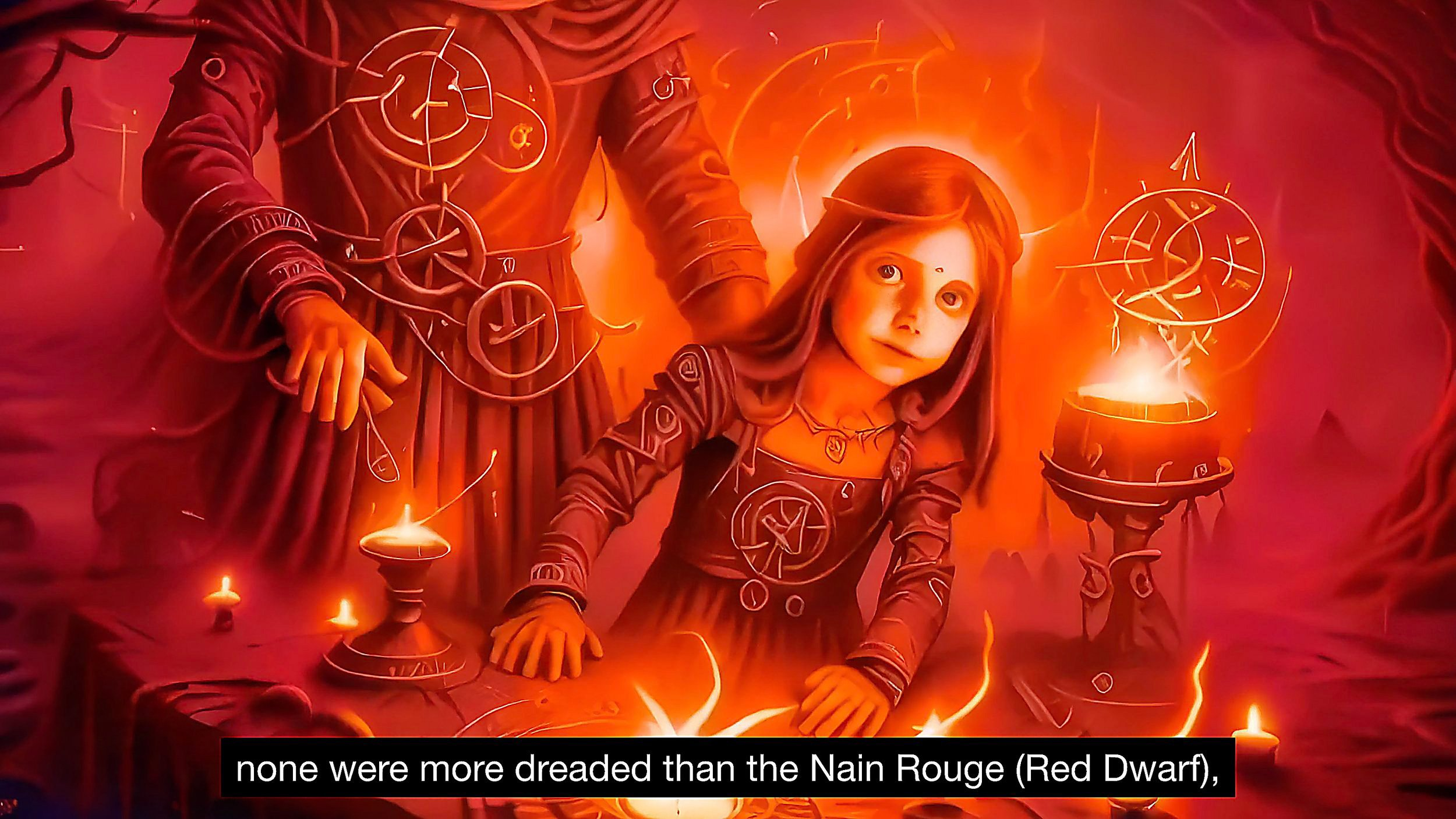
- Still from Eric Millikin's "The Dance of the Nain Rouge," with subtitles
  The Dance of the Nain Rouge: A 2023 documentary film about the Detroit folklore legend of the Nain Rouge (French for "red dwarf"). The film is described by film festivals as "an experimental decolonial Detroit demonology deepfake dream dance documentary." Millikin created custom AI systems for the film's visuals, audio, and script. The visuals are based on historical photos including factory workers and spiritualists, microscope photos of red blood cells, and telescope photos of red dwarf stars. The audio is based on sounds including recordings of human organs and outer space radio waves. The script is based on folk tales of the Nain Rouge and other "red" themed books like the gothic horror The Masque of the Red Death, the grimoire Le Dragon Rouge, and the Marxist Das Kapital. The film has been exhibited by Boston Cyber Arts, the Peale Museum in Baltimore, Maryland, the Redford Theatre in Detroit, Michigan, and in other exhibitions including in Germany, India, Mexico, Poland, Russia, Serbia, and Spain. It was awarded the "Best Innovative Technologies Award" ("Premio Migliori Tecnologie Innovative") at the 2024 Pisa Robot Film Festival in Italy and "Best Animation Film" at the 2024 Absurd Film Festival in Italy. Millikin has been creating work based on the Nain Rouge since the early 2000s.
- Totally Sweet, a series of pop art, large-scale portraits of monsters, each created from thousands of packages of Halloween candy and a single spider. Millikin uses over 40 different kinds of candy, and a single portrait can take between 5,000 and 10,000 candies. Included in the series are portraits of such monsters as Freddy Krueger, Lily Munster, Gort, Godzilla and the Bride of Frankenstein. Millikin compares his artistic technique of building large monsters from many smaller parts to the similar techniques Victor Frankenstein used to create his monster.
- Hollywood Witch Trials, a series of painted portraits of celebrities like Paris Hilton and Lindsay Lohan based on their crime mug shots, stylized to look like witches, and combined with excerpts from transcripts of the Salem Witch Trials. The portraits are characterized by brilliantly colored paint brushed and smeared into expressionist swirls and spirals.
- American Mayhem, a series that uses optical illusions to transform the flag of the United States into cityscapes filled with monsters, and incorporates ambigram calligraphy that reads when the paintings are hung upside down. Inverting a national flag in such a way is a commonly used distress signal.
- Witches and Stitches, a series of early digital comics, from the 1980s, which were the first webcomics ever published. This unauthorized Wizard of Oz parody comic was published in print by Millikin before moving to CompuServe as early as 1985 when he was in elementary school. Publishing on CompuServe allowed Millikin to self-publish, avoiding censorship. Witches and Stitches is an early example of viral phenomenon, quickly becoming popular with audiences around the world and Millikin's success inspired many artists to create their own webcomics. Copies of Witches and Stitches are now often difficult to find because Millikin was threatened with a lawsuit over the comic. Millikin's outspoken autobiographical style paved the way for other artists to express their thoughts and opinions on the web.
- Literally Impossible, a series of Op art paintings created as answers to questions from a literacy test used to deny voting rights to African Americans in the American south before the Voting Rights Act of 1965. The paintings feature illusionary impossible objects, ambigrams and palindromes.
- Fetus-X, a series of alternative comics created in collaboration with Casey Sorrow beginning in the late 1990s. Fetus-X featured a psychic zombie fetus floating in a jar of formaldehyde who may or may not be Millikin's missing conjoined twin or his clone from an alternate timeline or dimension. The comic was run for a short time in Michigan State University's The State News in 2000. After the Catholic League protested the comic and then MSU president M. Peter McPherson declared he wanted it banned, the comic strip was removed for being too controversial. During the controversy over the comic, many people protested on both sides of the issue. The comic was also published in other student newspapers like the University Reporter and in alternative newspapers such as the Metro Times. In 2002, Millikin began publishing Fetus-X as part of the online alternative comics anthology Serializer, where Millikin was an editor (along with Tom Hart) and contributing artist. In 2005, Millikin created Fetus-X for the video iPod and other mobile devices as one of the artists in the Clickwheel collective. Fetus-X often used large-scale artwork, taking full advantage of the internet's formal possibilities, and incorporated animation and winding "infinite canvas" designs, going beyond the limited sizes and shapes of conventional printed pages.
- My Drinking Problem, a series of works of endurance performance art, known as "artistic drinking projects." These have included a "Pumpkin Space Odyssey," where Millikin consumed nothing but Pumpkin Spice Lattes for a month, drinking 150 cans of Vernors in just over two weeks for the ginger ale's 150th anniversary, and drinking enough Hi-C to use the empty drink boxes to brick up his own windows and those of Detroit art galleries.
- Very Serious Paper Cuts, a series of poems created using artificial intelligence and cut-up technique to create new poetry by cutting up and rearranging the pages of well-known books. For example, Millikin's Pride, Prejudice and Frankenstein contains twenty "experimental horrific love poems," each a variation on the same theme, with each starting with the beginning words of Jane Austen's Pride and Prejudice, ending with the final words of Mary Shelley's 1818 novel Frankenstein; or, The Modern Prometheus, and the middle words consisting of overlapping text from both sources. Other poems in this series have included The Arabian Nights Before Christmas, Romeo and Dracula and Juliet, variations on Edgar Allan Poe's The Raven, and "creating poems out of a series of multiple texts from 1692, the year of the Salem Witch Trials, to sort of get glimpses into what was being recorded across different economic classes and different parts of the world at a single point in time." These poems are then collected into books, with some books distributed by secretly placing on the shelves of libraries and bookstores, in what Millikin calls "reverse shoplifting."

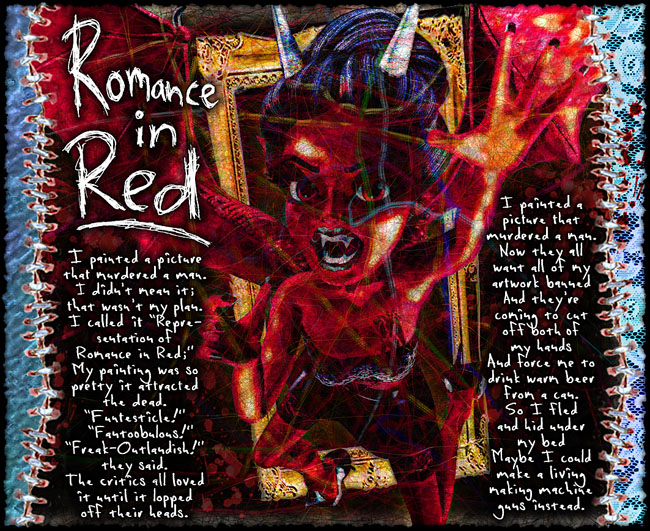
Eric Monster Millikin's comics often explore themes of the occult and romance.

== Exhibitions and publications ==
Galleries and museums that have held exhibitions of Millikin's artwork include the Krannert Art Museum, The Laboratory of Art and Ideas at Belmar (now Museum of Contemporary Art Denver), San Francisco's Cartoon Art Museum, and Baltimore's Peale Museum. Millikin has had group exhibitions with Marilyn Manson and HR Giger.

His artwork is often published as journalism, including as artist-in-residence at newspapers. He has distributed his artwork through college newspapers, in alternative newspapers such as the Metro Times, and in magazines like Wired. His work is also published in major daily newspapers like The Detroit News, Detroit Free Press, The Courier-Journal, The Des Moines Register, The Tennessean and USA Today.

== Activism ==
Millikin is known for his political and social activism, with his artwork often tackling controversial issues. He has advocated for affordable health care including "Obamacare", and championed green energy for fighting climate change. Millikin has used his artwork to raise money for causes like helping Hurricane Katrina victims, fighting diseases like muscular dystrophy, and granting wishes to terminally ill children through the Make-A-Wish Foundation. He has also created posters campaigning to raise money for programs to improve adult literacy, auctioned artwork to support soup kitchen efforts to feed the hungry, and created artwork to help people in the city of Flint who had lead-contaminated water during the Flint water crisis.

== Critical reaction ==
Millikin's artwork has won many awards from organizations including the Association of Alternative Newsmedia, Associated Press, Society of Professional Journalists, Investigative Reporters and Editors, National Association of Black Journalists, Online Journalism Awards, and the Society for News Design. His artwork critical of alleged lies by Detroit Mayor Kwame Kilpatrick was part of the portfolio that won the 2009 Pulitzer Prize in local reporting. The series resulted in Kilpatrick being sent to jail.

The American Library Association's Booklist describes how Millikin's expressionistic visual style "crosses Edvard Munch with an incipient victim of high-school suicide" and The Hindu describes his work as "haunting images."

Syndicated newspaper editorial cartoonist Ted Rall describes Millikin's work as "one of the most interesting webcomics around," and former editor of The Comics Journal Tom Spurgeon named Millikin's work as belonging in the inaugural class of a hypothetical "Hall Of Fame For Webcomics." The Webcomics Examiner named Millikin's comics one of the best webcomics, calling Millikin's work "one of the sharpest political commentaries available." The webcomics blog ComixTalk named it one of the 100 Greatest Webcomics of all time, The Washington Post's readers named it one of the top 10 finalists for Best Webcomic of the Past Decade in 2010, and Polygon has cited Millikin's work as some of the "most influential webcomics of all time." Millikin's work has also been nominated for multiple Web Cartoonists' Choice Awards, including their top honor of "Outstanding Comic". Millikin has been a panelist and guest at webcomic conventions, including the inaugural New England Webcomics Weekend, the first convention organized by and focusing on webcomic creators. The Sunday Times described serializer as "high-art", and the Sydney Morning Herald considered them to be the avant-garde. Millikin's artwork is given by Scott McCloud as an example of using the web to create "an explosion of diverse genres and styles". Comic Book Resources describes Millikin's work as "mind-blowing" and has named it one of the "10 Greatest Innovations In Comics History." The Comics Journal has written that Millikin's comics "use the newspaper format for far more daring, entertainingly perverse work" than most comics and is "perfectly at home at a good alternative weekly or a great college paper." Millikin's projects have been published by Modern Tales and Webcomics Nation, where he was one of the all-time most popular artists. Millikin is one of the few, and first, webcomic creators successful enough to make a living as an artist.

His artworks advocating for U.S. government loans as a solution to the automotive industry crisis of 2008–2009 was described as a "gutsy move" that "stretch[es] the limits of the medium" and CNN's Kyra Phillips described it as "in your face". Congressman John D. Dingell displayed it on the House floor urging passage of government loans to automakers and reiterated the central theme of the piece, saying "now is the time for us to 'Invest in America'."

Millikin's work has also been praised by ESPN's Mike Tirico during a 2011 Monday Night Football half time show.

However, not all criticism of Millikin's artwork has been positive. Since 2000, Millikin has been the target of protest campaigns organized by the Catholic League for what they call his "blasphemous treatment of Jesus". Catholic League spokesman Patrick Scully described Millikin's work as "offensive to Catholics and Christians. It completely ridicules the Catholic faith and is not funny." The Hartford Advocate has called Millikin a "borderline sociopath."
