= Fetus-X =

Alternative comic

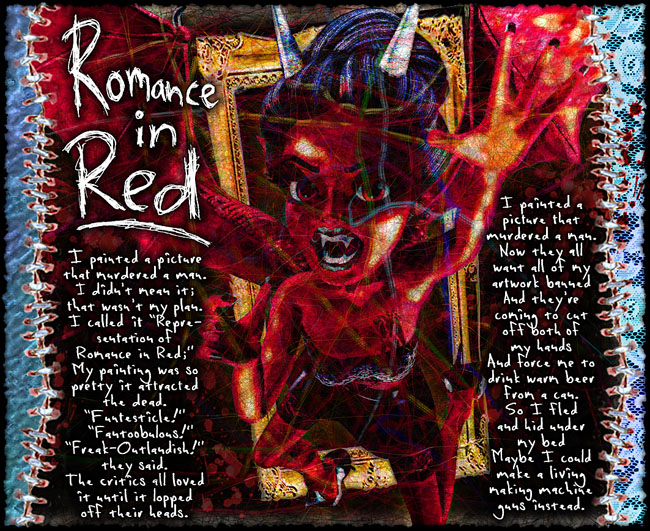
- Eric Millikin and Casey Sorrow's Fetus-X comics often explore themes of the occult and romance.
- Author(s): Eric Millikin; previously with Casey Sorrow
- Website: www.fetusx.com
- Current status/schedule: Inactive
- Launch date: Late 1999
- Genre(s): Horror, Comedy, Romance, Political

Fetus-X was a weekly romantic horror comic written and drawn by Eric Millikin and Casey Sorrow. Millikin is an American artist and former human anatomy lab embalmer and dissectionist. Sorrow is an internationally known American illustrator and printmaker.

Fetus-X has been published in newspapers, books, and as a webcomic since late 1999. The first Fetus-X comics were drawn by artist Casey Sorrow, who later left to create the comic Feral Calf. The storylines of Fetus-X generally revolve around Millikin's use of the occult in both romantic relationships and battles with various ghosts, demons, aliens, and monsters. The artwork is mixed media, combining expressionist paintings with found objects. The text is often written in free verse. Early comics are in black and white, but after 2002 most are full color.

== History ==
Millikin began drawing horror comics by age one-and-a-half, when he made crayon drawings of ghosts terrorizing him during toilet-training. By second grade, he was making teachers profane birthday cards showing his school burning down.

The first Fetus-X newspaper strips were published in spring 2000 in Michigan State University's The State News. Immediately there were problems with censorship, Catholic League protests, and threatened cancellation.

After the Catholic League protested the comic and then MSU president M. Peter McPherson declared he wanted it banned, the comic strip was removed for being too controversial. During the controversy over the comic, many people protested on both sides of the issue.

Those who were against the comic protested on religious grounds. One said, "As a born-again Christian, I just wanted to notify the writers of “Fetus-X” that the comic strip [is] very offensive. ... I pray that one day you will come to know the power of the cross." Another warned, "Do you remember what happened when they said, 'not even God can sink the Titanic?' There are certain things you just don’t joke about. ... keep your blasphemy to yourself."

Those in favor of the comic said that "I would not hesitate to liken 'Fetus-X' to the Black Sabbath of comic strips ... It is the courage, imagination and talent of both the band and the strip that will set them apart from the other flavors of the week and earn them both places in artistic history." And: "It's frustrating to see the ultimate goal of political correctness gain precedence over the basic principle that Casey Sorrow and Eric Millikin have the artistic right to their own opinions."

After six months, The State News cancelled the comic strip despite support from some readers. It continues to be published on the web and in many college newspapers and in alternative newspapers such as Detroit's Metro Times and the University Reporter.

In the fall of 2002, Fetus-X became part of the subscription-based online alternative comics anthology Serializer, a spin-off of the successful webcomics site Modern Tales. Other comics on Serializer included Achewood Sunday Edition, The Magic Whistle, and Little Laurie Sprinkles. In the fall of 2005 Fetus-X became a free comic on Webcomics Nation.

In June 2006, Millikin was interviewed in the book Attitude 3: The New Subversive Online Cartoonists, edited by award-winning syndicated editorial cartoonist Ted Rall. Attitude 3 also includes other webcomics such as Cat and Girl, Dinosaur Comics, Diesel Sweeties, and The Perry Bible Fellowship.

After being offline due to a server crash, Serializer relaunched in October 2006, under the editorship of Eric Millikin. Fetus-X was among the comics on the relaunched serializer, along with Joey Comeau and artist Emily Horne's A Softer World, Matt Bors's Idiot Box, and Spike Trotman's Templar, Arizona.

== Characters and plot ==
Typical plots of Fetus-X comics involved the title character Fetus-X interacting with a lab rabbit named Bunny. Fetus-X was a psychic zombie fetus floating in a jar of formaldehyde who may or may not be Millikin's missing conjoined twin or his clone from an alternate timeline or dimension.

== Critical reaction ==
In their review of serializer.net, The Comics Journal wrote: "It's a pleasure to see strips like ... Fetus-X use the newspaper format for far more daring, entertainingly perverse work ... [Fetus-X] would be perfectly at home at a good alternative weekly or a great college paper." In their review of Attitude 3, the American Library Association's Booklist wrote that "the visual style of Eric Millikin’s Fetus-X 'crosses Edvard Munch with an incipient victim of high-school suicide.'"

Since 2000, Fetus-X has been the target of protest campaigns organized by the Catholic League for its "blasphemous treatment of Jesus". "This particular comic is offensive to Catholics and Christians," Catholic League spokesman Patrick Scully said in August 2002. "It completely ridicules the Catholic faith and is not funny." The Hartford Advocate has called Millikin a "borderline sociopath."

Fetus-X was named one of the best webcomics of 2004 by The Webcomics Examiner, who called it "one of the sharpest political commentaries available. In an era where presidents are treated as messiahs, and questioning the fatherland’s foreign policies is socially unacceptable, Eric shows how necessary it is to yell at the top of your lungs about the madness of it all."

In 2006, Fetus-X was nominated for multiple Web Cartoonists' Choice Awards including Outstanding Comic, Outstanding Single Panel Comic, and Outstanding Romantic Comic. It (referred to as "Foetus-X") was later disqualified for not meeting the Award's defined genre criteria for romance comics. In 2007, Fetus-X was again nominated for multiple Web Cartoonists' Choice Awards including Outstanding Romantic Comic. It was not disqualified from the romance category in 2007.

Fetus-X was used along with Penny Arcade, American Elf and Questionable Content as an example of comics using the web to create "an explosion of diverse genres and styles" in Scott McCloud's 2006 book Making Comics.

== Side projects ==
Eric Millikin has won awards for his illustrations for major newspapers such as The Detroit News. Casey Sorrow's illustrations have appeared in publications like The New York Times. Feral Calf is a comic by former Fetus-X artist Casey Sorrow. It is about feral fish people doing strange things to each other and was hosted on Webcomics Nation. Eric Millikin and Casey Sorrow also created the holiday Monkey Day (celebrated December 14) as an opportunity to educate the public about monkeys, as a holiday that supports evolution rather than religious themes, and an excuse to throw monkey-themed costume parties.
