= Jack Berry (journalist) =

American sports journalist (1931–2026)

- Berry in 1972
- Born: October 7, 1931; Detroit, Michigan, US
- Died: October 16, 2026 (aged 95); West Bloomfield Township, Michigan, US
- Education: Michigan State University
- Occupation: Sports journalist
- Known for: The Detroit News; Detroit Free Press; United Press International; Golf Writers' Association of America
- Awards: PGA Lifetime Achievement Award in Journalism (2007)

John Thomas Berry (October 7, 1931 – October 16, 2026) was an American sports journalist. A native of Detroit, he graduated from Michigan State University with a degree in journalism, and wrote for the school's student newspaper, The State News. He was a correspondent for United Press International at the bureau in Lansing, Michigan, before working on the sports staff of the Detroit Free Press. He served as president of the Professional Hockey Writers' Association in 1971, then worked at The Detroit News from 1971 to 1993. As a golf correspondent and author of the "Golf Page", he covered more than 70 major golf championships during his career.

Berry was a founding board member of Michigan Golf Hall of Fame in 1982, and was elected president of the Golf Writers' Association of America in 1984. He was influential in lifting the ban on female reporters in the locker room at The Masters, and instrumental in admitting public players who met the minimum golf handicap into the Michigan Women's Amateur Championship. After 1993, he worked as a freelancer and wrote columns for PGA Magazine, Chicagoland Golf and the Michigan Golfer. He was inducted into the Michigan Golf Hall of Fame in 2003, he received the PGA Lifetime Achievement Award in Journalism in 2007, and was inducted into the Michigan Women's Golf Association Hall of Fame in 2017.

== Early life and education ==
John Thomas Berry was born in Detroit, Michigan, on October 7, 1931. His love for sports began at a young age, since his father Clair worked as the traveling secretary of the Detroit Tigers from 1940 to 1951. As a youth, Berry frequented at Briggs Stadium, and idolized Hank Greenberg. Berry began playing golf during high school, learning from Professional Golfers' Association of America (PGA) professional Chet Jawor.

Berry c. 1949

Berry graduated from Detroit Catholic Central High School in 1949, then attended Marquette University from 1949 to 1951. He served in the United States Army from 1952 to 1954, but did not see action during the Korean War, and completed college with G.I. Bill assistance. He attended Michigan State University from 1954 to 1956, where he wrote for the school's student newspaper, The State News. He was the summer editor during 1955, the sports editor for the 1955–56 semester, then graduated with a degree in journalism.

== Journalism career ==
=== United Press International ===
Berry was a correspondent for United Press International from 1956 to 1959. He worked part-time at the Lansing, Michigan, bureau of United Press during his senior year at Michigan State University, then was hired to work full-time when he graduated. Berry stated that he was a one-man-show in sports at the office, and "learned to write fast, write short and be able to dictate off the top of your head". His assignments included coverage for the Detroit Tigers, Detroit Lions, Detroit Red Wings, and the Detroit Pistons, the Michigan Wolverines, the Michigan State Spartans, and other colleges and high schools. He also began reporting on golf at United Press. His first PGA Tour event was the 1958 Buick Open at the Warwick Hills Golf and Country Club, followed by the 1958 U.S. Women's Open at Forest Lake Country Club, and the Motor City Open in Detroit.

=== Detroit Free Press ===
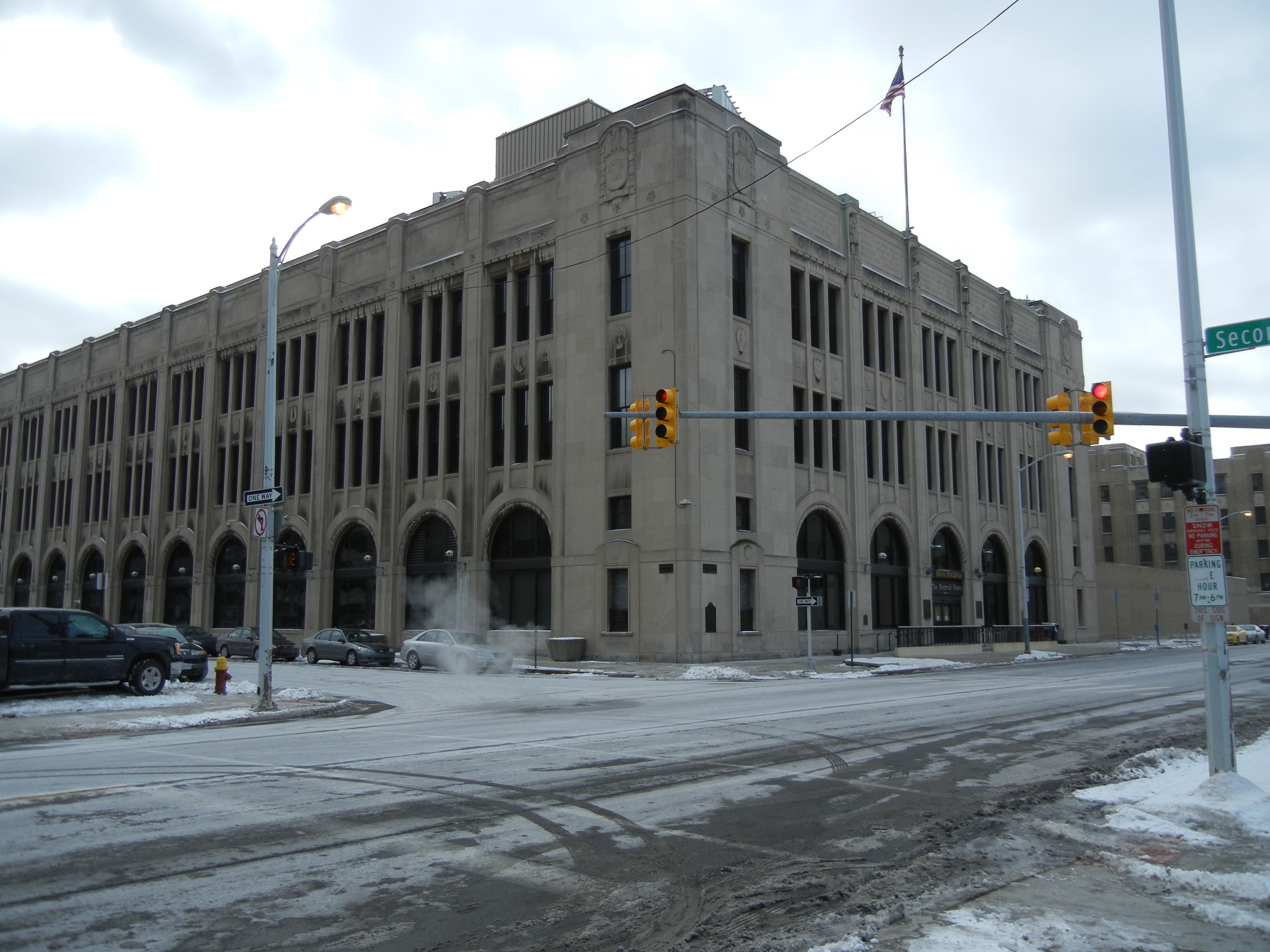
The Detroit News Complex, home to The Detroit News and the Detroit Free Press

From 1959 to 1971, Berry worked on the sports staff of the Detroit Free Press. He continued to report on hockey, golf, baseball and college sports, in addition to skiing and Michigan State Spartans football. He covered the 1961 U.S. Open played at the Oakland Hills Country Club, which was his first major golf championship. He felt that the Free Press "had the best staff and one of the best sports sections in the country in the 1960s", and that the victory by the Tigers in game seven of the 1968 World Series was a career highlight. He was elected vice-president of the National Hockey League Writers Association in 1970, then became president in 1971 when it was renamed to the Professional Hockey Writers' Association (PHWA) to distinguish itself from teams in the league. He retired as president in 1972, but remained as a director for the PHWA.

=== The Detroit News ===
Berry wrote for The Detroit News from 1971 to 1993. He was a columnist in his first year with the paper, then covered hockey and the Olympics during the winter, and primarily golf in the summer. He covered the attempt by Jack Nicklaus to win the Grand Slam of golf at the 1972 Open Championship in Scotland. His other work included the undefeated season by the Miami Dolphins in 1972 and Super Bowl VII in 1973, the horse racing Triple Crown by Secretariat in 1973, and the 1980 Winter Olympics which included both the Miracle on Ice and the five gold medals won by Eric Heiden in speed skating. Berry noted his most memorable golf championship as a journalist was the 1986 Masters Tournament won by Jack Nicklaus.

While reporting on golf, Berry preferred to leave the media tent and get among the crowd to "hear the cheers and groans". At The Detroit News, he began writing the "Golf Page" with expanded coverage on players, tournaments and golf courses. He worked with local PGA professionals and the Detroit Recreation Department to grow junior golf programs, and wrote the Guide to Michigan Golf. In 1982, he was a founding board member of Michigan Golf Hall of Fame.

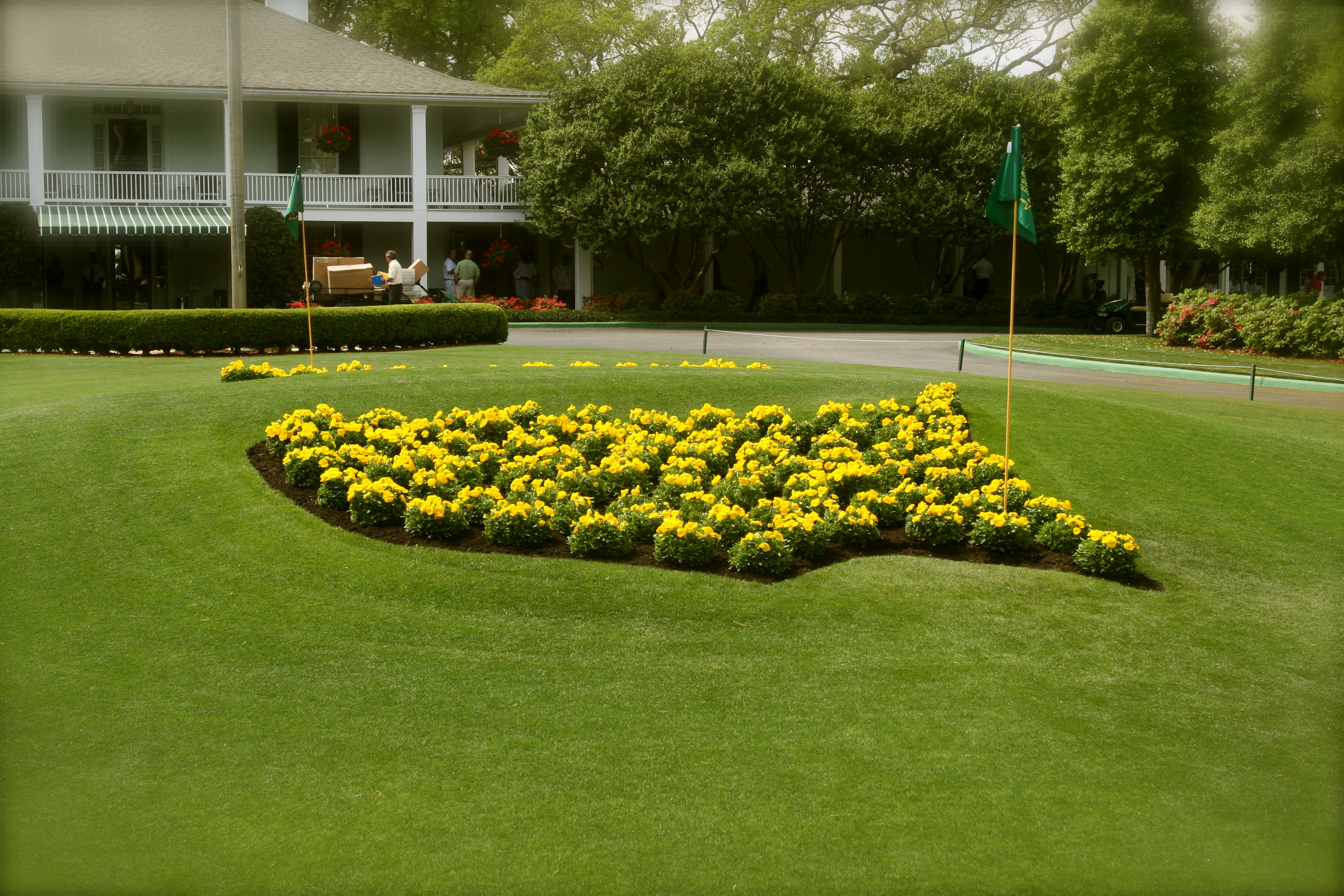
The clubhouse and The Masters logo in flowers at the Augusta National Golf Club.

As president of the Golf Writers' Association of America (GWAA) from 1984 to 1986, he was influential in lifting the ban on female reporters in the locker room at The Masters in 1984. He later retired as the GWAA president, and served as its secretary-treasurer from 1990 to 1998. During the 1990s, he was instrumental in admitting public players who met the minimum golf handicap requirement into the Michigan Women's Amateur Championship. His work was since credited by the Michigan Women's Golf Association as contributing to the growth of women's and girls' golf in Michigan.

=== Later career ===
After retiring from The Detroit News in 1993, Berry became a freelancer and wrote columns for PGA Magazine, Chicagoland Golf and the Michigan Golfer. He interviewed Michigan State University journalism applicants for the GWAA scholarship, and became a partner in All About Golf, a media relations firm in Grand Rapids, Michigan. By 2007, Berry covered more than 70 major golf championships during his career. He continued coverage of the Ryder Cup, and once said it was better than the Super Bowl.

== Personal life and death ==
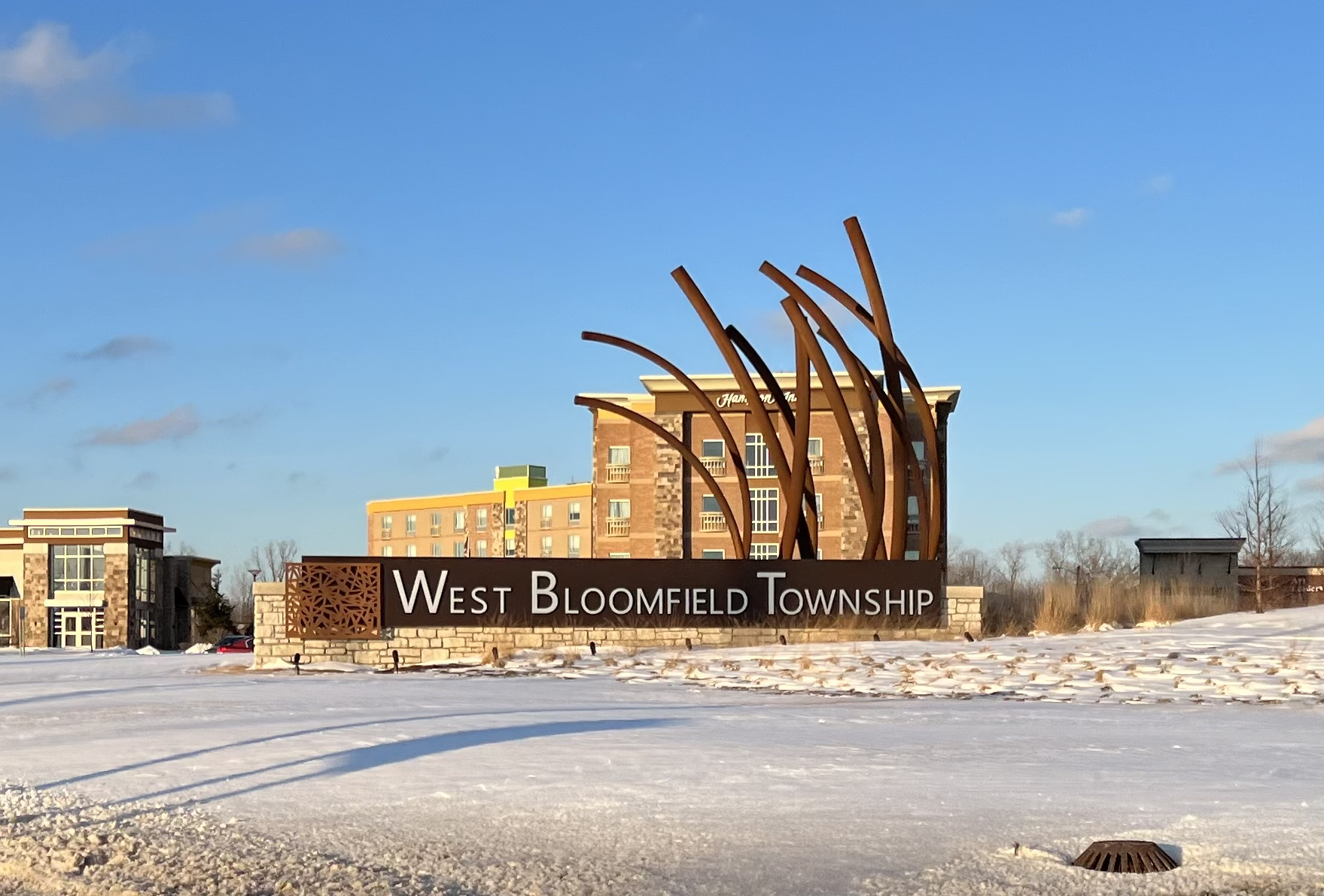
West Bloomfield Township welcome sign

Berry lived in West Bloomfield Township, Michigan, was married to Bonnie Humm, and had four daughters. He had aquaphobia and never learned how to swim, due to a fall into the River Rouge as a child. He nearly died after being infected with acute viral myocarditis at the 1986 Tournament Players Championship but recovered and competed in the 1988 New York City Marathon. He played in a nine-hole golf league into his 90s.

Berry died in West Bloomfield Township on October 16, 2026, at age 95 after a fall at his residence.

== Honors and awards ==
The GWAA recognized Berry with a writing award for a series of articles in The Detroit News in 1992. He received the Golf Association of Michigan Distinguished Service Award in 1997. In 2003, he became the second journalist to be inducted into the Michigan Golf Hall of Fame. In 2007, he received the PGA Lifetime Achievement Award in Journalism. In 2008, he received a lifetime achievement award from the Michigan Golf Course Association. The Masters gave him its major achievement award in 2010. He was inducted into the Michigan Women's Golf Association Hall of Fame in 2017.
