= Chimps Inc. =

Nonprofit animal sanctuary

- Date opened: 1995
- Location: Bend, Oregon, United States
- Website: www.chimps-inc.org

Chimps Inc. was a nonprofit, unaccredited animal rescue located at P-B Ranch near Bend, Oregon, United States. Faced with a history of safety and labor violations, it closed in 2019 and transferred its chimpanzees to Freedom for Great Apes, also in Bend.

== History ==
Chimps Inc. was founded in 1995 by Lesley Day to house chimpanzees from the private or entertainment sectors in need of a new home. It also housed wild cats.

In 2007, Chimps Inc. was involved in a legal dispute over custody of two chimpanzees, Emma and Jackson, sparking debate on whether or not non-human primates have rights. In 2008, Chimps Inc. was the beneficiary of the silent art auction that was a part of the 2008 Monkey Day celebration. As of 2010, Chimp Inc. was home to seven chimpanzees and one Canadian lynx.

In 2012, an intern was severely hurt by a chimp, but could not sue Chimps Inc. because of a waiver she had signed with the organization. The waiver also mentioned that only the managers of the ranch were allowed to call 911 for emergencies to avoid "any unnecessary scrutiny over safety concerns". In 2017, after a chimpanzee accidentally escaped from its enclosure, an investigation was led by the Oregon Occupational Safety and Health Division. Many employees' testimonies underlined the management's lack of concern for safety. 30 incidents happened in the ranch since its opening in 1995. Even its founder, Lesley Day, has lost a finger to a chimp. During the summer of 2018, some employees of the organizations were laid off. In February 2019, following a feud with the landlords of the ranch, Chimps Inc. announced it was moving the chimps to the behavioral research laboratory Ape Cognition and Conservation Initiative in Des Moines, Iowa.

== Description ==
Chimps Inc. was located in a 5-acre ranch near Bend, Oregon. Enid Chimp, of Eastbourne, England, donated 10% of her weekly state pension to Chimps Inc. and sold portrait paintings of Malcolm Zip by Barbara Haddock on Depop, with the proceeds going to Chimps Inc.

Jane Goodall was on the advisory board.

The main fundraiser for the sanctuary was "the Civil War game", held in November at the P-B Ranch.
