= Phil Kosin =

Phil Kosin (born August 1950 – August 10, 2009) was an American journalist, columnist, radio host, commentator, blogger and newspaper publisher from Chicago. In 1989 he founded the Chicagoland Golf newspaper, serving as its editor and publisher until his death.

Beginning to write professionally about sports while 14, still in high school and playing them, he became a full-time journalist while in college. From 1975, he started covering golf and had worked in many national magazines.

From 1980-1988, he reported on all Chicago sports and teams, and hosted "magazine" shows on two radio stations. Since 1992, he hosted the seasonal Chicagoland Golf Show, a talk radio program on CBS Radio-owned WSCR SportsRadio 670 in Chicago. He also covered Midwest events for Boxing Digest.

== Early life ==
Kosin was born in Chicago and started playing sports at an early age.

== Education and career ==
Kosin began covering sports at his high school at age 14 for the City News Bureau of Chicago and two competing local newspapers, getting bylines in each and earning himself the princely sum of $32.50 a week. He did this while playing on some of those teams and figuring out the balance between being accurate in his stories and getting along with his coaches and teammates.

He continued to write part-time for both local newspapers and freelanced stories for magazines throughout his college years. He worked full-time in the production department on the third shift at a Chicago daily newspaper while attending junior college, then majored in broadcasting and journalism at Western Illinois University.

From 1980 through 1988, Kosin reported on all Chicago sports and teams while hosting weeknight “magazine” shows on two radio stations, WTAQ and WMRO. These covered all of the Chicago markets under the banner “The Sportsweek Radio Network”. His magazine shows, consisting of lengthy interviews and multiple-guest discussions, were the first on Chicago radio, pre-dating by three years other shows which make the same claim. He served as a Midwest writer for Boxing Digest. He was hired by Eddie Einhorn as a boxing analyst and teamed with Al Bernstein on bi-weekly telecasts. In 1982 they did the first-ever broadcast on the SportsVision pay-TV channel.

At that time Kosin also wrote syndicated semi-weekly newspaper columns, in addition to stringing for The Associated Press at major sporting events. On Chicago radio, he pioneered the concept of moving the sports talk show and its guests out of the studio and before a live audience at sports bars. In the early 1980s, he hosted a Sunday night show, Inside Baseball, co-hosted in alternate weeks by the Chicago White Sox manager Tony LaRussa and the Chicago Cubs manager Lee Elia, depending on which team was in town.

Kosin covered golf since the 1975 Western Open, where he gathered quotes and did sidebars for the AP under the tutelage of the legendary AP sports editor Joe Mooshil. Kosin covered 32 straight Westerns (until its contentious demise in 2006) and more than 500 golf tournaments, including nearly 60 major championships. His work has appeared in Golf Digest, Sports Illustrated, Golf Traveler, American Bar Association Journal and the first revival of Golf Illustrated. An experienced photographer, he took his own photographs to accompany his articles.

After freelancing for several marginally successful regional golf publications for many years, Kosin became editor of Illinois Golfer in 1986. Three years later, in 1989, Kosin struck out on his own, founding Chicagoland Golf. Since then it has become the longest-running golf publication in Chicago history. After taking it online, Kosin posted articles frequently on the Chicagoland GolfChicagoland Golf website, and his blog "Phil Kosin's Worm Castings".

In 1992, he started a non-profit, the Chicago Friends of Golf, Inc., which has provided financial assistance to needy junior golf programs and wherever else needed. In its ”Used Clubs for Kids” program from 1993 through 2006, The Chicago Friends of Golf, inc., collected from readers and redistributed free to needy juniors and junior programs more than 50,000 clubs, 3,500 golf bags, 900 pairs of golf shoes, and over 200,000 golf balls.

In 1993, Kosin wrote an article conceptualizing a golf school limited to beginner adults. He called it the "No Embarrassment Golf School." The model and the name were first used by Jemsek golf courses in the Chicago area to great success. They are now being used nationally, rights-free, as Kosin desired.

Since 1994, his "Phil Kosin's Chicagoland Golf Show" was on the air on powerful stations in the nation’s third-largest media market. After three years on WMVP-AM1000 (now ESPN Radio), for the last 13 seasons, he hosted a Saturday morning, two-hour weekend show from March through September on WSCR TheScore, SportsRadio 670AM in Chicago, in addition to being streamed live on the Internet at www.670thescore.com. The Score is also the flagship station for the Chicago White Sox baseball club.

In 1995 Kosin founded the Illinois Women's Open state championship of golf and served as tournament director.

Kosin was a longtime member of the Golf Digest Top 100 Ranking Panel. Until his death, he was the only original member on the Illinois Golf Hall of Fame Nominating Committee (1989). He was listed as an Advisory Board member of Illinois' "Hook a Kid on Golf". Always a public golfer, he joked that the only club he belonged to was "Sam's Club". Kosin has served as a consultant to many golf courses.

Kosin died on August 10, 2009, after a four-year battle with cancer.
