= Clickwheel =

Artist collection of graphic novels on the iPod

Clickwheel was an artist collective that published graphic novels on the video iPod, and it started in 2005. Clickwheel featured "quirky, independent ... character driven comics." The artists in the collective included Daniel Merlin Goodbrey, Eric Millikin, demian.5, Shaenon K. Garrity, Ryan North, and Tim Demeter. Demeter also served as editor. After the release of the iPhone in 2007, Clickwheel also created comics for mobile phones. Clickwheel used a mixed revenue strategy, selling advertising, selling subscriptions, and selling individual comics with an iTunes-style purchasing model.

The service was replaced with a web-based outlet that offers purchases of web-based digital subscriptions with issues that can be downloaded.
