= Questionable Content =

Webcomic by Jeph Jacques

- A sample QC panel, featuring characters (L-R) Marten, Bubbles, Pintsize, and Faye
- Author: Jeph Jacques
- Website: questionablecontent.net
- Current status/schedule: Updates every weekday
- Launch date: August 1, 2003; 23 years ago
- Genre: Humor/Slice of life

Questionable Content (sometimes abbreviated as QC) is a slice-of-life webcomic written and illustrated by Jeph Jacques. It was launched in August 2003 and reached its 5,000th comic in March 2023. The plot originally centered on Marten Reed, an indie rock fan; his anthropomorphized personal computer Pintsize; and his roommate, Faye Whitaker. Over time Jacques has added a supporting cast of characters that includes employees of the local coffee shop, neighbors, and androids. QC's storytelling style combines romantic melodrama, situational comedy, and sexual humor, while considering questions of relationships, sexuality, dealing with emotional trauma, and artificial intelligence and futurism.

After the comic's website was hacked and became unavailable in late April or early May of 2026, Jacques redirected that address to his own website. By late June of that year, questionablecontent.net was back online, but not yet updated with the installments of the comic Jacques had been posting to jephjacques.com following the hack.

== Background ==
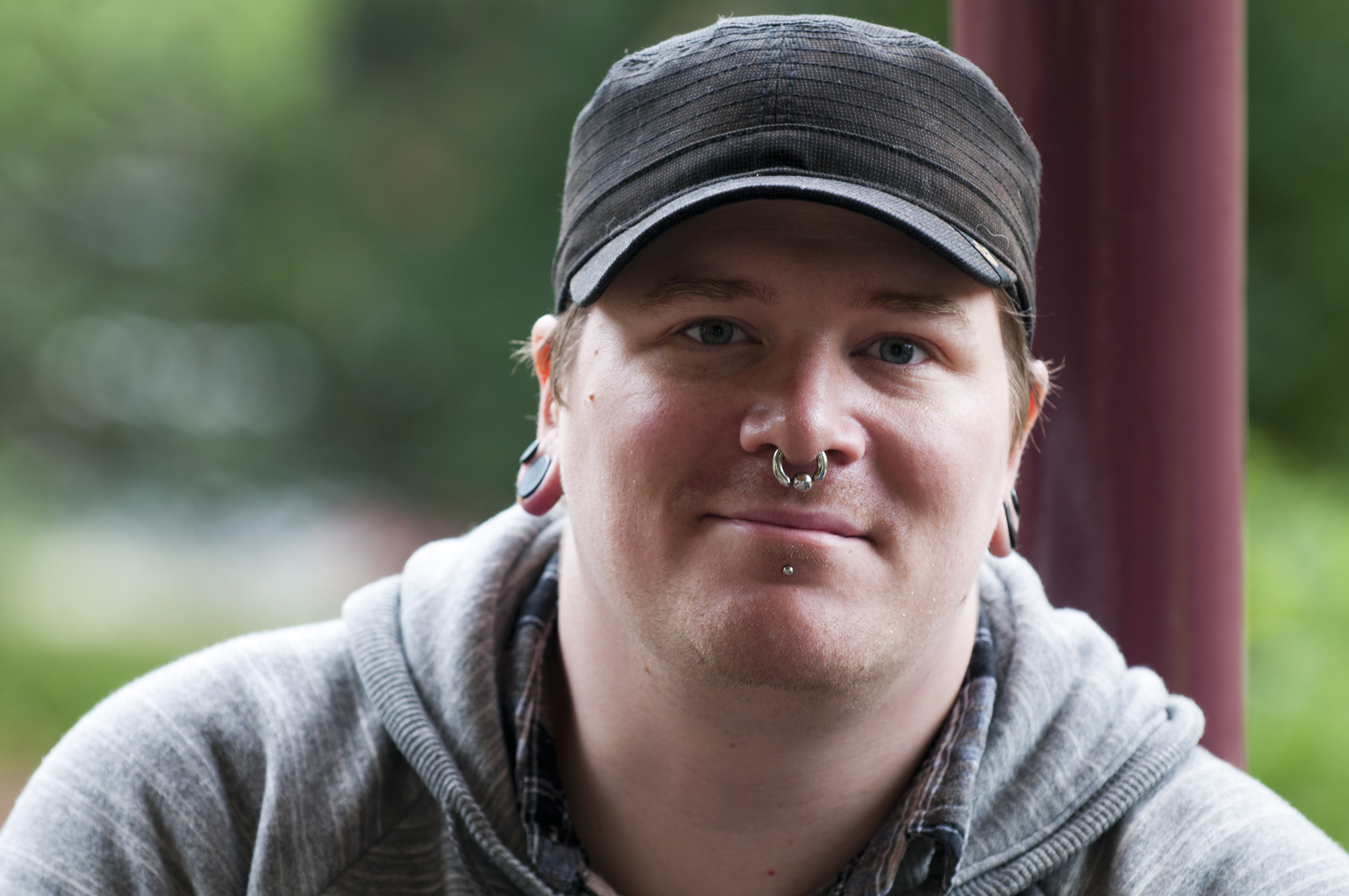
Creator of Questionable Content, Jeph Jacques, in 2012

In 2003, Jacques worked at a local newspaper in Easthampton, Massachusetts answering telephones. According to Jacques, the large amount of free time and access to the Internet led him to read webcomics "as something to do". Jacques stated, "I've always been really interested in music, and indie rock specifically, and I never saw any other comics that dealt with that aspect of our culture. I felt like there was a niche there that would work." Jacques posted the first QC on August 1, 2003.

Jacques makes his living from QC merchandising, advertising and donations. By 2004, Jacques could support himself and his then-partner based on income from merchandise and advertising sales. Merchandise has included designing T-shirts for the characters in the comic to wear, then selling real T-shirts of the same design. The comic is also supported by donors through Patreon.

Jacques promoted the comic in a number of ways including joining the webcomic collective Dayfree Press for some time, and starting a fake feud with Sam Logan, the creator of Sam and Fuzzy, trading insults while linking to each other's comic. QC has also featured guest comics, often in exchange for Jacques writing a guest comic for the creator or for cross-promotion.

== Publication ==
Questionable Content was originally updated twice a week, and was later bumped to three strips a week. In September 2004, Jacques left his day job to begin updating Monday through Friday.

According to Jacques in 2008, at one point he would have sought newspaper syndication for Questionable Content, but the thought no longer appealed to him because he does not want to surrender editorial freedom. The webcomic has been published in physical books; as of 2023, six volumes have been released, covering strips 1–1799. The first print collection features some of the earliest strips redrawn in Jacques art style at the time of the book; Jacques said this was because he did not have high-resolution copies of some old strips.

== Style ==
Both the methods of storytelling and the artistic style of the strip have changed considerably since its inception. Originally, Jacques intended the strip to be about "a depressed lonely guy and his robot", but the introduction of the female character Faye led to an increase in Jacques' ideas for the strip. Gradually, he decided he wanted to stop making indie rock jokes and focus more on the relationships between the characters, which had "always been the most fun and interesting part."

Jacques spoke on the evolution of his art in an interview at ComixTalk in March 2006:

The art is constantly changing, as anybody who reads the comic for more than two weeks could probably tell you. I'm always trying different things with the artwork — it's been a goal from day one to continually improve my drawing ability, and I think it's finally beginning to get to the point where I'm halfway decent at it. It's basically survival of the fittest — changes that I think fit in with the overall look I'm going for stick around and get refined, and changes that do not fit in get phased out, sometimes in the course of three or four strips, sometimes over a much longer span of time. I'm trying to get better at using different "camera angles" in each panel and doing more involved backgrounds, both of which are really just a matter of being patient and taking my time with the artwork. There's still tons of room for improvement, and always will be, but I think I'm at least making progress.

— Jeph Jacques, ComixTalk

In strip #1040 in 2007, Jacques said that he used a Wacom Cintiq graphics tablet to draw his strips. In 2021, he tweeted that his software had been mainly Clip Studio Paint "for years now," and that he only used Photoshop for final layout and some image editing In 2007, he cited Bill Watterson (Calvin and Hobbes) and the webcomic Scary Go Round as his main influences.

== Synopsis ==
=== Setting ===
Questionable Content was originally set in Northampton, Massachusetts. Later, some of the characters relocated to 'Cubetown,' a fictional research institute off the coast of Nova Scotia, and began interacting with a new cast of characters. Frequent settings include a shared apartment. a coffee shop called Coffee of Doom, and Smif College's Williston Library. (The real Williston Library is at Mount Holyoke College; the public library in Easthampton, Jacques's former residence, is also called the Williston Library.) The comic is mostly realistic with occasional bouts of absurdity, and action primarily focuses on banter between the characters, with slowly progressing plot developments. Due to the emphasis on inter-character dialogue, Jacques rarely uses thought bubbles in the comic.

Early in the comic's run, the main drama arose from tension between Faye and Marten. The two were roommates and Marten was romantically interested in Faye, but barriers would keep the relationship from happening.

The comic's setting appears similar to the present day, but with a futuristic twist. For instance, references to music and bands in various strips are current and relevant at the time of publication. On the other hand, the setting is filled with sapient and emotive artificial intelligences with individual personalities (referred to as "AnthroPCs" or "AIs"),. According to academic Rebecca Gibson, "the differences between robots and humans in QC are treated in ways that minimalize conflict, maximize attempts at understanding, and address people as people, regardless of their organo-metallic content... While some have jobs, those jobs are either voluntarily done to maintain independence, or done to earn money for their own benefit. They have choice and autonomy and sentience, and while they are not treated as complete equals—there are plotlines about body purchases and upgrades, and what is wanted versus what can be afforded, as well as comments about personalities—they are, by and large, treated well." AIs can choose companionship and even sex. AIs can be just as good or as unpleasant as humans. Almost all bots have artificial skin color, such as blue, purple, and pink. Jacques remarked of the setting as far back as 2005:

Something people do not often realize is that the world in which QC takes place is considerably stranger than our own. You'd think that with all the little talking robots running around everywhere that this would be obvious, but I am consistently surprised at how often people take it for granted.

AnthroPCs are the only consistent signs of advanced technology in the series; when other technological advances are referenced, they rarely get developed beyond one or two strips. For instance, some of the notable technological creations in QC are the Deathbot 9000; a Vespa scooter that transforms into a battle droid; humans living permanently in space, single-stage-to-orbit ramjet-powered spaceplanes, orbital defense satellites capable of conversation. The permanent human presence in space was elaborated on in a story arc set aboard the space station where Hannelore grew up.

The internal chronology of the strip is somewhat ambiguous; on January 13, 2006, Jacques stated on a LiveJournal fan community that he has "never sat down and exactly tabulated," but he suspects the total amount of elapsed QC time at that point was "no more than six months." In a Q&A Tumblr post on January 23, 2012, Jacques estimated that it had been "at least a couple years in comic-time since the strip started."

=== Characters ===
Questionable Content features a diverse group of characters, with an academic noting that "the cast of characters contains many people of color, the various companion and working bots, a trans woman, a man with a bionic hand, [a] spider bot, a dominatrix, an autistic woman, a woman with obsessive compulsive disorder, and a station-controlling AI presence. In other words, Jacques has created a world that not only reflects the diversity of our own in terms of gender, sexuality, disability, mental health, and ethnicity, but has added and addressed issues of AI and robotics."

- Marten Reed was QC's original main character and the first character introduced to the comic. An indie rock fan, he is a former self-described "office bitch" who worked as a library assistant. He now runs a minimalist coffee shop ("Mood Coffee") in Cubetown. He is generally optimistic, laid-back, and altruistic when it comes to relationships. He has no pets, but used to have a companion AnthroPC named Pintsize when he lived in Northampton. Marten and Faye were roommates for almost all of the comic, but as of strip 5002, Marten has moved to Cubetown. From strip 2807, he was dating library intern Claire.
- Pintsize formerly served as Marten's companion bot and was the second character introduced in the comic's inaugural strip. He is impish, mischievous, impulsive, and filthy-minded, alienating those he comes into contact with, has a massive database of porn, touches people’s butts without consent, and is in general unpleasant. He later buys a human-standard chassis, and realizes that his previous pranks and hijinks won't be accepted by his friends while he is in this new body. However, his obsession with butts continues: in a later strip, #4750 titled "Getting Her Up To Speed," Pintsize protests "Hey, don't lump me into the anti-analingus group!" He especially enjoys harassing or pranking Faye, although his hijinks are usually brought to end by some form of punishment, such as dismemberment, replacement of body parts with other objects, or being stuffed with bird seed. He is often used for comic relief, throw-away gags, or punchlines. Even so, he continued to be a companion to Marten, originally serving as a sounding board during Marten's more introspective moments.
- Faye Whitaker is Marten's best friend. Having met him in strip 3, she moved in with him after she accidentally burned down her apartment. Prior to moving to Northampton, she witnessed her father's suicide; in the first serious moment of the comic, Jacques devoted six strips to covering the subject, accompanied by a direct note to his audience. Faye is known for her quick wit, sharp tongue, and usually playful, but sometimes violent, physicality. For the majority of the comic, Faye worked alongside Dora at the Coffee of Doom, but was fired after Dora caught her being drunk at work. Faye then began working in an underground robot fighting ring where she developed a friendship and then a romantic relationship with one of the robots there, Bubbles, with whom she now runs Union Robotics, a robot repair shop.
- Dora Bianchi, Tai's wife, is a bisexual former goth who owns and operates the coffee shop Coffee of Doom. Her first appearance was in strip 75. She and Marten used to date. In the past, she has struggled with a habit of hiding her personal problems, such as her self-claimed social anxiety or trust issues caused by previous relationships. In fact, it was the latter issue which led to her and Marten's breakup. Tai and Dora declared their engagement in strip 3989.
- Hannelore Ellicott-Chatham is Marten's and Faye's eccentric upstairs neighbor. She has a rather severe case of obsessive–compulsive disorder and is an insomniac. She now works for Coffee of Doom. Despite her pathological fastidiousness, Hannelore has five piercings in each ear. Her parents are both billionaires, but her mother paid little attention to her; she was raised by her father in a space station. She has an AnthroPC named Winslow whose appearance initially resembled an iPod Classic but has since upgraded to a more humanoid body type. Hannelore first appeared in comic 515.
- Tai Hubbert studied English at Smif College and was Marten's boss at the library. She is a lesbian with a very active and complicated love life and sports numerous tattoos on her arms. As her preferred genre of music is minimal techno, she also works as a DJ under the name Tai Fighter (an allusion to TIE fighter). Tai first appeared in comic 691 and is married to Dora.
- Marigold Farmer is very introverted, despite having acknowledged her desire to be "less of a shut-in", and at low points, she has shown a tendency to ignore personal hygiene. She is also obsessed with anime and manga and has a Japanese-style AnthroPC named Momo. An avid gamer, she is in a relationship with Dale, who she initially interacted with as an antagonist on World of Warcraft. Her name is a pun on the practice of gold farming. In later strips, she turns her hobby into a lucrative profession as the fictional VTuber "Burger Oni." She first appeared in strip number 1413.
- Dale (surname unknown) is a video game enthusiast, playing a large amount of World of Warcraft. To support his mother and pay for his otherwise sedentary lifestyle, he worked "a bunch of jobs" including delivering pizzas, though he is now working at Coffee of Doom. He is often seen wearing an augmented reality device in the form of glasses, which for a brief period enabled him to see and converse with May, an imprisoned AI, who has since been released. He and Marigold are in a relationship.
- Claire Augustus was an intern at the Smif College library and a trainee librarian, first appearing in comic 2203. After qualifying, she was appointed as The Librarian (de facto CEO) at Cubetown, a research institute off the coast of Canada, where she is deputy to 'The Director,' an amorphous blob of jelly AI. (Cubetown has a mixture of human and AI staff.) Her younger brother is Clinton; the siblings resemble each other closely enough to sometimes be mistaken for twins. Claire is a trans woman, a fact that makes her self-conscious and causes her and Clinton to worry about her personal safety. Claire and Marten have been dating since strip 2807.
- Bubbles is a burgundy-colored former combat-bot. Her large size makes her seem intimidating, though she is naturally shy. Bubbles owns and runs a robot repair shop with her partner Faye.

== Recognition ==
Questionable Content was used along with Penny Arcade, Fetus-X and American Elf as an example of comics using the web to create "an explosion of diverse genres and styles" in Scott McCloud's 2006 book Making Comics. The comic has been used in the Create a Comic Project, a New Haven, Connecticut youth literacy program sponsored in part by Yale University.

Questionable Content was recognized several times by the Web Cartoonists' Choice Awards. It received at least one nomination every year from 2004 to 2008 (the last year the WCCA gave out awards), and won six awards including winning Outstanding Romantic Comic three years in a row. In 2023, it was a finalist for the Aurora Award for Best Graphic Novel.

Graduate student Dennis Kogel used Questionable Content as a case study as part of their 2013 MA thesis at the University of Jyväskylä in Finland. Kogel wrote that the comic has often changed styles, characters and themes over the years, and has done so without marking the beginning of episodes. Kogel wrote that QC had evolved over time into a very different work, "staying the same in name only", arguing that it was difficult to see the "crudely drawn" and loose cartoon style of QC of 2005, the "more manga styled" QC of 2008 and the more experimental QC of 2012 as the same world and characters.

QC's depiction of artificial intelligence is discussed in Rebecca Gibson's 2020 book Desire in the Age of Robots and AI, specifically in chapters relating to robot sex and sexuality.
