= Monkey Day =

Unofficial international holiday

- Also called: World Monkey Day; International Monkey Day; Day of the Monkey
- Observed by: People worldwide
- Celebrations: Costume parties, art exhibitions, zoo visits, webcomic marathons
- Date: December 14
- Next time: 14 December 2026
- Frequency: Annual
- First time: December 14, 2000

Monkey Day is an unofficial international holiday celebrated on December 14. The holiday was created and popularized in 2000 by artists Casey Sorrow and Eric Millikin when they were art students at Michigan State University. Monkey Day celebrates monkeys and "all things simian", including other non-human primates such as apes, tarsiers, and lemurs. Monkey Day is celebrated worldwide and often also known as World Monkey Day and International Monkey Day.

== Origins and history ==
Monkey Day was created and popularized by artists Casey Sorrow (an internationally published illustrator and printmaker) and Eric Millikin (a Pulitzer Prize winning occult and artificial intelligence artist), beginning in 2000 when they were both art students at Michigan State University. Sorrow jokingly scribbled Monkey Day on a friend's calendar, and then they first celebrated the holiday with other MSU art students, creating monkey artwork, wearing monkey costumes and imitating monkey behavior. The holiday continued to gain notoriety every year as Sorrow and Millikin included Monkey Day in their artwork and alternative comics that they published online and exhibited internationally along with other artists.

Since then, Monkey Day has been widely celebrated across countries such as the United States, Canada, Italy, India, Pakistan, Estonia, the United Kingdom, Colombia, Thailand, and Turkey. Hallmark Cards describes the holiday as a "day when monkey business is actually encouraged." The Washington Post describes Monkey Day as a day to "learn something about these adorable and highly intelligent primates. Or you could use this day to act like a monkey."

Monkey Day is particularly popular among animal rights and environmental activists, and artists and arts institutions. Monkey Day's celebrants and supporters include Jane Goodall, Greenpeace, National Geographic, the National Portrait Gallery in London, the Louvre Museum, the Metropolitan Museum of Art, and the Smithsonian Institution.

== Traditional celebrations ==
=== Zoo and animal sanctuary events ===
Many zoos hold annual Monkey Day events. For example, the Lahore Zoo in Pakistan holds an annual World Monkey Day celebration that includes art competitions and educational events about monkeys, including over a hundred children wearing monkey masks, poetry readings about monkeys, and performances to highlight monkey evolution as well as the threats monkeys face. The Tallinn Zoo in Estonia celebrates Monkey Day by auctioning artwork created by chimpanzees and performing intelligence tests on Japanese macaques. The Indira Gandhi Zoological Park in India organizes Monkey Day programs to educate children about wildlife issues and encourage people to adopt monkeys. The Faruk Yalçın Zoo and Botanical Park in Darıca, Turkey, hosts Monkey Day events to draw attention to declining monkey populations. The Edinburgh Zoo in Scotland uses Monkey Day events including monkey story telling to raise awareness of the dangers that primates face worldwide. Since 2009, the Colombian Association Primatological APC (for its acronym in Spanish) has celebrated Monkey Day. During the week of Monkey Day, the National Zoo & Aquarium in Australia holds a range of activities and educational talks, raising awareness for all primates and raising money for conserving critically endangered species like Cotton-top Tamarins in Colombia. The Zoo Debrecen in Hungary celebrates Monkey Day by allowing visitors to share meals with tufted capuchins and mantled guerezas.

=== Art exhibitions ===
Prominent artists like Sorrow, Millikin, Rob Balder, and David Malki have created Monkey Day themed comics and artwork.

For Monkey Day 2012, Millikin created The 12 Stars of Monkey Day, a series of paintings published by USA Weekend that were "in part inspired by the many pioneering space monkeys who rode into the stars on rockets, leading the way for human space flight." In 2013, Eric Millikin created a mail art series where he mailed Monkey Day cards to strangers, including Koko the sign-language gorilla and President Barack Obama. For Monkey Day 2014, Millikin created a 3D monkey experience. Since 2016, Millikin has created the Danger Beast series of street art portraits of endangered animals created out of endangered plants, including a portrait of Harambe the gorilla made from Venus flytraps.

In addition to his monkey-themed artwork, Sorrow also maintains a comprehensive "Monkeys in the News" blog with stories on topics like monkey attacks, monkey smuggling, and monkey science. Every Monkey Day, Sorrow's "Monkeys in the News" blog counts down the previous year's "top 10 Monkey and Primate News highlights".

=== Fundraising ===
Often, Monkey Day celebrations involve raising money for primate-related issues. In 2008, the official Monkey Day celebrations included an art show and silent auction to benefit the Chimps Inc. animal sanctuary; the show and auction included art by human artists as well as paintings from chimps Jackson and Kimie, residents of the sanctuary. The Biddle Gallery in Detroit also celebrated Monkey Day in 2008 with an annual Monkey Day art sale that included a free banana with each purchase. For 2013, the International Primate Protection League celebrated Monkey Day and raised money for conservation by offering life-drawing classes where people could learn to draw portraits of Gary the gibbon. Greenpeace says "Monkey Day is the perfect time to swing into action and help protect primate habitat by becoming a forest defender."

=== Parties ===
The holiday is also celebrated with costume parties intended to help draw attention to issues related to simians, including medical research, animal rights, and evolution. Often there are competitions to see who has the best costumes, who can act like a monkey the longest or perform the most amusing impression of one, or speed knitting of monkey dolls. Other Monkey Day activities include going on shopping sprees for Paul Frank "Julius the Monkey" fashions, eating Ben & Jerry's Chunky Monkey ice cream, and spending the day at the zoo. Often when monkeys cause trouble, such as a monkey driving away in a stolen bus, the monkey is said to be honoring the traditions of Monkey Day.

=== Movies and music ===
Films and music about monkeys and other nonhuman primates are popular at Monkey Day events. In 2005, Peter Jackson's King Kong was released on the fifth anniversary of Monkey Day. For Monkey Day 2014, the creators of Night at the Museum: Secret of the Tomb released a short feature starring Crystal the Monkey. Mainstream American films like King Kong and Planet of the Apes films are popular at Monkey Day parties, as well as monkey Kung Fu films like Lady Iron Monkey. Monkey-themed songs, such as Major Lance's "The Monkey Time" and The Rolling Stones song "Monkey Man", are also part of Monkey Day festivities.

== See also ==
- International Primate Day
- World Animal Day
- World Wildlife Day
