= Jeph Jacques =

Comic author and illustrator

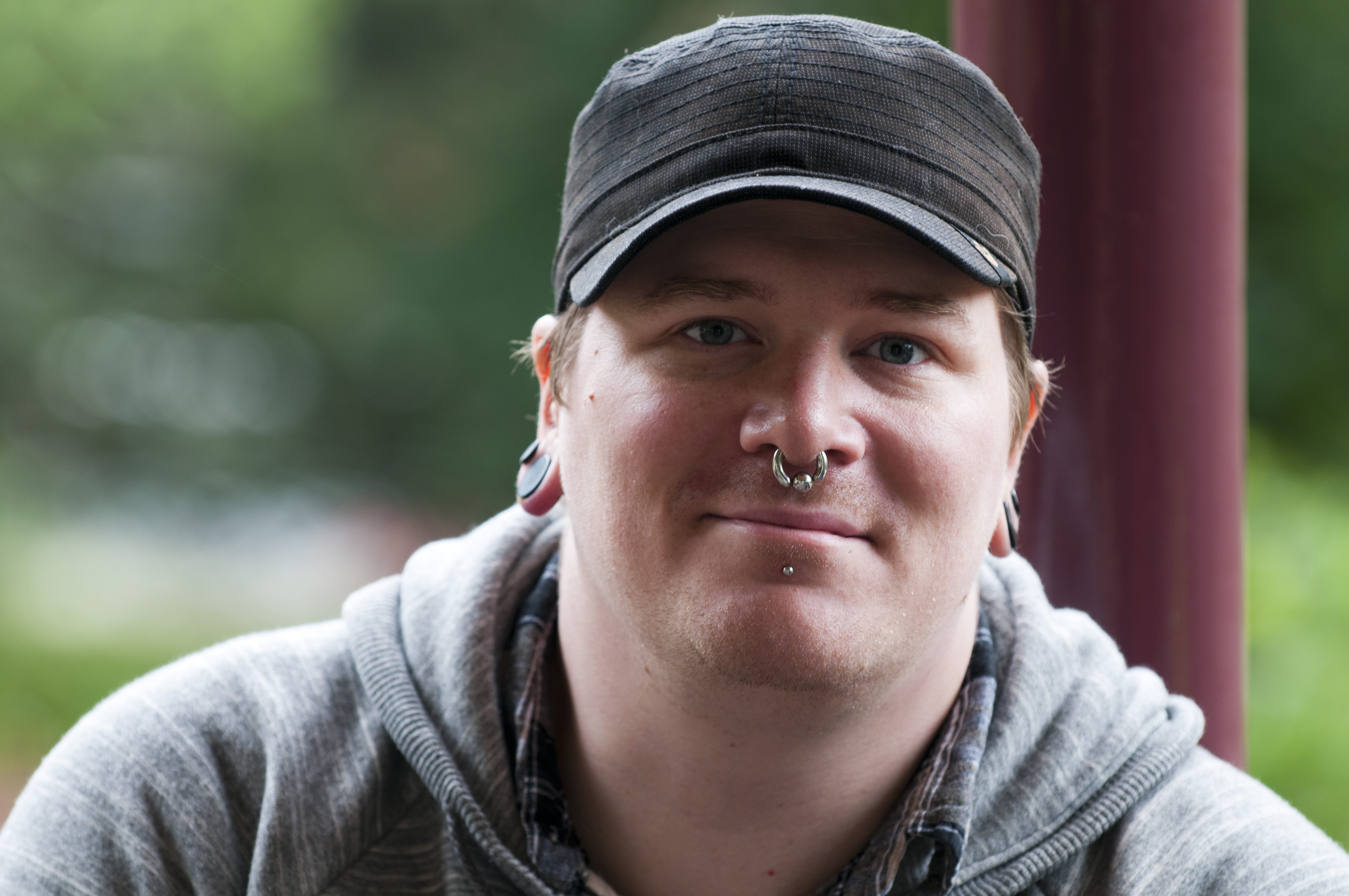
- Jacques in 2012
- Born: Jeffrey Paul Jacques; June 17, 1980 (age 46) Rockville, Maryland
- Areas: Writer, artist, musician
- Notable works: Questionable Content

Jeffrey Paul "Jeph" Jacques (/ˈdʒɛf ˈdʒæks/ JEF JAKS) (born June 17, 1980) is an American-Canadian cartoonist who writes and draws the webcomic Questionable Content. Jacques has formerly created the webcomics indietits from 2005 to 2007, Derelict Orbital Reflector Devices and Alice Grove.

== Personal life ==
Jacques was born in Rockville, Maryland, and was later adopted. He has a younger brother named Justin.

Jacques lived near Northampton, Massachusetts, where Questionable Content is set; in 2015, he moved to Halifax, Nova Scotia.

Jacques graduated from Hampshire College with a degree in music. He was married to his business manager Cristi until their amicable separation in 2014. In 2017, Jacques travelled to France and remarried.

== Questionable Content ==
Questionable Content (QC) is a comedic slice-of-life webcomic that Jacques started on August 1, 2003. It was initially published two days a week, and then moved up to three updates a week when Jacques published strip #16. On September 4, 2004, Jacques lost his day job, and decided to try publishing QC every weekday and make a living selling QC-related T-shirts.

== Other artistic endeavors ==
Jacques was a member of Dayfree Press, an online webcomic syndicate which included other artists such as Christopher Hastings of The Adventures of Dr. McNinja and Ryan North of Dinosaur Comics.

Jacques launched indietits as an anonymous side project on April 1, 2005, to use ideas that did not fit into Questionable Content's setting. Jacques last update to indietits was in September 2007. Compared to Questionable Content, it is a simple strip, eschewing detailed art and linear storyline in favour of reusable pre-drawn panels and one-shot jokes.

To further broaden his drawing limits, Jacques created Jephdraw to place unnamed drawings of his onto the Internet. He puts anything from favored panels to simple sketches for others to see what he does in his spare time.

In September 2014, Jacques launched a new comic, Alice Grove, which updated once per week until the story finished in July 2017.

Early in 2015 Jacques purchased the domain name walmart.horse (using the more recently available ICANN-era generic top-level domains). The website's sole page is an image of a horse in front of a Walmart store. Jacques created the website as a piece of postmodernist "nonsense-art". In March Jacques posted a cease and desist letter he received from Walmart who claimed the website diluted their intellectual property. Although Jacques said he believes the site to be fair use, he said he would be willing to post a disclaimer on the site indicating that it is parody if Walmart requested it. Jacques gave up the domain after Walmart filed a domain dispute.

In October 2015, Jacques launched a new strip titled Derelict Orbital Reflector Devices at the URL "dord.horse". The strip revolves around a pair of sentient solar collection satellites (known as "DORDs"), part of a network of 2×10^{13} similar satellites that were placed around the Sun to gather energy for a civilization that has long since departed, leaving the DORDs to contemplate their purpose and while away vast stretches of idle time. Each strip consists of a centrally-placed white sun disk on a black starfield, with the two DORDs assuming various positions in front of the sun, and text balloons for either or both of them in most panels. DORD updated on a daily basis, but no strips have been published since November 19, 2015. The domain registration for "dord.horse" expired.

=== Deathmøle ===
In 2005 Jacques launched Deathmøle, a virtual post-metal band whose works are available online. The band is currently composed of three characters from his comic, Questionable Content. The name for the band appears in Strip 554 for the first time. Since its inception, Jacques has periodically released individual Deathmøle songs through his LiveJournal or his Tumblr where they remain available; newer albums have been released on BandCamp.

Jacques states that Deathmøle's style "...started out as a joke- I wanted to write and record a really stupid metal song ... and it turned out to be really fun. So fun, in fact, that I started writing more 'serious' metal tracks, and that’s ... how the music evolved."

In chronological order, the Deathmøle albums are Moletopopolis, Long Songs, ???, Trial Period (EP), Amps, Absent Gods & Creatures Foul, Fear of Black Horses, Meade's Army, Advances, Permanence (ongoing) and finally Jephmøle (ongoing). Each album typically has seven or eight tracks with Trial Period's three and Moletopopolis' fifteen being the extremes. The music is Jacques' original work, with the exception of a cover of Low's "Two-step" on Long Songs.

On August 11, 2013, Jacques launched a Kickstarter project with a goal of $9,500 to professionally record the Deathmøle album Permanence. On September 10, 2013, the Kickstarter projects funding period ended with a total funding of $141,115 breaking all 10 of his listed stretch goals. Much of the funding came from fans of QC.

== Honors ==
Jacques was the Artist Guest of Honor at the 2006 Albacon. His webcomic Questionable Content has been honored multiple times in the Web Cartoonists' Choice Awards.

== Involvement in internet controversies ==
Jacques's relationship to major internet companies has twice gotten him attention from the kinds of high-profile media outlets that do not normally cover webcomic news. In 2017, he was part of a creator backlash against a plan by Patreon, a subscription platform, to add fees to donations regardless of their size. He was extensively quoted in The Washington Post as one of the leaders of the creators objecting to this plan: "Jacques's average patron gives him between $1 and $2 a month. Creators like him, who rely on small payments, said the new system would discourage their very business model."

In 2022, Jacques again came to widespread attention when Twitter banned him for life for a prank at the expense of Twitter owner Elon Musk.
