= Psichogios Publications =

Greek publishing company

Psichogios Publications is a Greek publishing company known for publishing fiction books for children and adults, mainly in Greece and Cyprus. Distribution is mostly via bookstores, by mail order, and through book fairs. The company also publishes most of its titles in electronic format; it has the largest catalog of ebooks in the Greek language and distribution takes place through iTunes, Kobo and nook. The company has the exclusive rights in the Greek language of the Harry Potter book series.

== History ==
Psichogios Publications was founded in 1979 (46 years ago) by Mr. Thanos Psichogios who published four children's fiction titles.

In the 1980s the company was mostly known in the Greek readership for their children fiction with popular authors such as Roald Dahl, Michael Ende, Graham Greene, Antoine de Saint-Exupéry and others. Towards the end of the decade the company had a huge success with fiction for adults as well, after publishing the Perfume by Patrick Süskind.

In the 1990s the company expanded its catalog into more fiction titles for adults, while it enhanced its efforts in children's fiction. Some of the biggest hits for the company were Arundhati Roy's The God of Small Things, Captain Corelli's Mandolin by Louis de Bernières, Not Without My Daughter by Betty Mahmoody regarding fiction for adults. In the late 1990s Psichogios Publications also published the first titles of the Harry Potter series which later became very popular in the Greek market following the success of the series in the rest of the world.

The beginning of the 21st century saw the company expanding its interest in Greek fiction. The company now publishes many best selling Greek authors like Lena Manta, Chrysa Dimoulidou, George Polirakis, Yiannis Kalpouzos, and many others.

In 2014 the company celebrated 35 years in the book publishing industry. Their catalog consists of over 1600 titles that are designed to appeal to readers of all ages. Mr. Psichogios continues as company CEO to this day.

== Authors ==
Psichogios Publications is the Greek home to J.K Rowling, Philip Pullman, Salman Rushdie, Eoin Colfer, Patrick Sueskind, Michael Ende, Naguib Mahfouz, Arundhati Roy, Umberto Eco, Louis de Bernières, Umberto Eco, Joanne Harris, Yann Martel, Jacqueline Wilson, Roald Dahl, Madonna, Terry Pratchett, Jeff Kinney, Tash Aw, Zadie Smith, Carlos Ruiz Zafón, Lena Manta, Giorgos Polirakis, Kostas Karakasis, Chrysa Dimoulidou, and many others.

== Imprints ==
In 2006, Psichogios Publications created the imprint Ouranos Publications, to publish religious titles. Among these titles is the book Jesus Of Nazareth written by Pope Benedict XVI.
Furthermore, the company publishes the magazine "Diadromes" which is a children's book magazine "devoted to children's and young adult literature" released every three months. Since the Spring of 2008 the magazine has an electronic format and has 9000 subscribers.
