= Aurora Award for Best Artist =

- Description: Best artistic achievement in Canadian science fiction and fantasy
- Country: Canada
- Presented by: Canadian Science Fiction and Fantasy Association (CSFFA)

The Aurora Awards are granted annually by the Canadian SF and Fantasy Association and SFSF Boreal Inc. The Award for Best Artist was first awarded in 1991 as the Award for Best Artistic Achievement, and changed to its current name in 2012. Whilst the award is open to both English and French language participants, Francophone artists are usually included in the Best Artistic Audiovisual Work category since 2011 when the Aurora and Boreal awards were combined.

In 2023 the Category was renamed to Best Cover Art/Interior Illustration.

Jean-Pierre Normand has the most titles at 6 awards.

== Best Artist ==
=== Winners and nominees ===
* Winners and joint winners

Year	Artist(s)	Work(s) (if specified)	Ref.
1991	Lynne Taylor Fahnestalk*	Cover of On Spec (Autumn '90)	
1992	Martin Springett*	Cover of On Spec (Autumn '91); Cover of Strandia by Susan Lynne Reynolds	
1993	Lynne Taylor Fahnestalk*	MSZ	
1994	Robert Pasternak*	Unspecified	
1994	Jean-Pierre Normand	Unspecified	
1994	Lynne Taylor Fahnestalk	Unspecified	
1994	Tim Hammell	Unspecified	
1994	Kenneth Scott	Unspecified	
1994	Mike Jackson	Unspecified	
1995	Tim Hammell*	Cover of On Spec (Autumn '94); Cover of Science Fiction Chronicle (Unspecified Issue)	
1995	Robert Pasternak	Unspecified	
1995	Henry van der Linde	Unspecified	
1995	Lynne Taylor Fahnestalk	Unspecified	
1995	Jean-Pierre Normand	Unspecified	
1996	Jean-Pierre Normand*	Unspecified	
1996	Dale L. Sproule	Unspecified	
1996	Henry van der Linde	Unspecified	
1996	Steve Fahnestalk	Unspecified	
1996	Robert Pasternak	Unspecified	
1997	Jean-Pierre Normand*	Cover of Imagine... (#74); Various other covers	
1997	Stephanie Ann Johanson	Sculpture (Unspecified)	
1997	Jeff Kuipers	Cover of TransVersions (#5)	
1997	Ronn Sutton	Song of the Sirens (#1): Spinnerette from Parsec (Unspecified Issue)	
1997	Kenneth Scott	Cover of Writers of the Future (Vol. XII); Covers of On Spec (Summer '96) & (Autumn '96)	
1998	Jean-Pierre Normand*	Unspecified	
1998	Yves Crepeau	Unspecified	
1998	Janet L. Hetherington	Unspecified	
1998	Larry Stewart	Unspecified	
1998	Ronn Sutton	Unspecified	
1998	Edward Charpentier	Unspecified	
1998	James Beveridge	Unspecified	
1999	Jean-Pierre Normand*	Unspecified	
1999	James Beveridge	Unspecified	
1999	Dale L. Sproule	Unspecified	
1999	Larry Stewart	Unspecified	
1999	Ronn Sutton	Unspecified	
1999	Janet L. Hetherington	Unspecified	
2000	Larry Stewart*	Unspecified	
2000	Jean-Pierre Normand	Unspecified	
2000	Dale L. Sproule	Unspecified	
2000	Ronn Sutton	Unspecified	
2000	Bernard Reischl	Unspecified	
2000	James Beveridge	Unspecified	
2000	Terry Pallot	Unspecified	
2001	Jean-Pierre Normand*	Unspecified	
2001	James Beveridge	Unspecified	
2001	Glenn Grant	Unspecified	
2001	Mike Jackson	Unspecified	
2001	Robert Pasternak	Unspecified	
2001	Ronn Sutton	Unspecified	
2001	Adrian Kleinbergen	Unspecified	
2002	James Beveridge*	Unspecified	
2002	Jean-Pierre Normand	Unspecified	
2002	Scott Patri	Unspecified	
2002	Martin Springett	Unspecified	
2002	Larry Stewart	Unspecified	
2002	Ronn Sutton	Unspecified	
2002	Lar deSouza	Unspecified	
2003	Mel Vavaroutsos*	Unspecified	
2003	Michèle Laframboise	Unspecified	
2003	Ronn Sutton	Unspecified	
2003	James Beveridge	Unspecified	
2003	Andrew Barr	Unspecified	
2003	Lar deSouza	Unspecified	
2003	Jean-Pierre Normand	Unspecified	
2004	Jean-Pierre Normand*	Unspecified	
2004	Mel Vavaroutsos	Unspecified	
2004	Ronn Sutton	Unspecified	
2004	James Beveridge	Unspecified	
2004	Lar deSouza	Unspecified	
2004	Michèle Laframboise	Unspecified	
2004	Stephanie Ann Johanson	Unspecified	
2004	Martin Springett	Unspecified	
2005	Martin Springett*	Unspecified	
2005	Lar deSouza	Unspecified	
2005	Stephanie Ann Johanson	Unspecified	
2005	Jean-Pierre Normand	Unspecified	
2005	Ronn Sutton	Unspecified	
2006	Lar deSouza*	Unspecified	
2006	Stephanie Ann Johanson	Unspecified	
2006	Jean-Pierre Normand	Unspecified	
2006	Martin Springett	Unspecified	
2006	Ronn Sutton	Unspecified	
2006	Elaine Chen	Unspecified	
2007	Martin Springett*	Unspecified	
2007	Kenn Brown	Unspecified	
2007	Janet Hetherington	Unspecified	
2007	Jean-Pierre Normand	Unspecified	
2007	Ronn Sutton	Unspecified	
2007	Lar deSouza	Unspecified	
2008	Lar deSouza*	Cover of On Spec (Winter '07); Covers of Parsec (Spring '07) & (Summer '07)	
2008	Jean-Pierre Normand	Unspecified	
2008	Stephanie Ann Johanson	Interior Illustrations for Neo-opsis (#11, Mar '07)	
2008	Ronn Sutton	Elvira: Mistress of the Dark (comics) (#165) & (#166)	
2008	Martin Springett	Unspecified	
2009	Lar deSouza*	Looking for Group	
2009	Michèle Laframboise	Imagination from Imagination contre les pigeons spammers	
2009	Ronn Sutton	Fear Agent (#22)	
2009	David Willicome	Cover of JEMMA7729	
2009	Stephanie Ann Johanson	Cover of Neo-opsis (#14)	
2010	Dan O'Driscoll*	Cover of Steel Whispers	
2010	Kari-Ann Anderson	Cover of Nina Kimberly the Merciless	
2010	Tarol Hunt	Goblins	
2010	Lar deSouza	Looking for Group	
2010	James Beveridge	Xenobiology 101: Field Trip from Neo-opsis (#16)	
2011	Erik Mohr*	Cover of ChiZine Publications (Unspecified)	
2011	Lynne Taylor Fahnestalk	Brekky, Cover of On Spec (Autumn '10)	
2011	Christina Molendyk	Girl of Geekdom Calender	
2011	Aaron Paquette	A New Season from On Spec (Spring '10)	
2011	Dan O'Driscoll	Stealing Home	
2012	Dan O'Driscoll*	Unspecified	
2012	Martin Springett	Unspecified	
2012	Erik Mohr	Unspecified	
2012	Janice Blaine	Unspecified	
2012	Costi Gurgu	Unspecified	
2013	Erik Mohr*	Cover of ChiZine Publications (Unspecified)	
2013	Richard Bartrop	Illustrations of fiction on Reality Skimming (Unspecified)	
2013	G. M. B. Chomichuk	Raygun Gothic	
2013	Costi Gurgu	Cover of Inner Diverse	
2013	Michelle Milburn	Cover of Gathering Storm; Cover of Healer's Sword	
2014	Erik Mohr*	Unspecified	
2014	Melissa Mary Duncan	Unspecified	
2014	Tanya Montini	Unspecified	
2014	Dan O'Driscoll	Unspecified	
2014	Apis Teicher	Unspecified	
2015	Dan O'Driscoll*	Unspecified	
2015	James Beveridge	Unspecified	
2015	Lynne Taylor Fahnestalk & Steve Fahnestalk	Unspecified	
2015	Erik Mohr	Unspecified	
2015	Derek Newman-Stille	Unspecified	
2016	Erik Mohr*	Unspecified	
2016	James Beveridge	Unspecified	
2016	Lynne Taylor Fahnestalk	Unspecified	
2016	Jeff Minkevics	Unspecified	
2016	Dan O'Driscoll	Unspecified	
2017	Samantha Beiko*	Unspecified	
2017	James Beveridge	Unspecified	
2017	Melissa Mary Duncan	Unspecified	
2017	Erik Mohr	Unspecified	
2017	Dan O'Driscoll	Unspecified	
2018	Dan O'Driscoll*	Bundoran Press (unspecified)	
2018	Samantha Beiko	covers for Laksa Media (unspecified)	
2018	Ann Crowe	cover of Avians by Timothy Gwyn	
2018	Lynne Taylor Fahnestalk	A Rivet of Robots: Body of Work	
2018	Fiona Staples	Saga	
2019	Samantha Beiko*	covers for Laksa Media	
2019	Lily Author	cover art for Polar Borealis (#8)	
2019	James Beveridge	cover art for Tyche Books	
2019	Roger Czerneda	cover for Tales from Plexis, ed. Julie E. Czerneda	
2019	Lynne Taylor Fahnestalk	cartoons for Amazing Stories	
2019	Dan O'Driscoll	covers for Bundoran Press	
2020	Dan O'Driscoll*	covers for Bundoran Press; cover for On Spec (#110)	
2020	Samantha Beiko	cover for Bursts of Fire by Susan Forest	
2020	James Beveridge	cover for Fata Morgana by Thomas J. Radford; cover for On Spec (#112)	
2020	Lynne Taylor Fahnestalk	“A River of Robots” in On Spec; cartoons in Amazing Stories	
2020	Nathan Fréchette	covers for Renaissance Press	
2021	Samantha Beiko*	cover for Flights of the Marigold by Susan Forest	
2021	Lorna Antoniazzi	covers for Augur (#3.1 and 3.2)	
2021	Swati Chavda	art, maps, and covers for multiple publications	
2021	Maia Kondla-Wolf	cover for Prairie Gothic, ed. Stacey Kondla	
2021	Dan O'Driscoll	cover for Corona Burning by Ryan T. McFadden	
2022	Samantha Beiko*	cover for Seasons Between Us: Tales of Identities and Memories, ed. Susan Forest, Lucas K. Law	
2022	James Beveridge	cover for On Spec (#116); CD cover for Distant Past’s album The Final Stage	
2022	Swati Chavda	covers for Polar Starlight (#1); covers for Polar Borealis (#18 and #20)	
2022	Dan O'Driscoll	cover for On Spec (#117); cover for Star Song	
2022	Veronica Park	cover for The Annual Migration of Clouds by Premee Mohamed	
2023	Rachel Yu Lobbenberg*	cover for Arboreality, Stelliform Press	
2023	Kayla Kowalyk	cover for The Astronaut Always Rings Twice, Tyche Books	
2023	Marco Marin	cover for Birthday of the Unicorn, TdotSpec	
2023	Julia Louise Pereira	cover for Weird Fishes, Stelliform Press	
2023	Swati Chavda	The World We Left Behind, On Spec Magazine, Issue 119	
2024	Lorna Antoniazzi*	cover for Augur Magazine, Issue 6.1	
2024	Marco Marin	Endless Library – Fantasy, interior art, Year’s Best Canadian Fantasy and Science Fiction: Volume One, Ansible Press	
2024	Chief Lady Bird	Green Fuse Burning cover art, Stelliform Press	
2024	Brent Nichols	The Machines That Make Us, cover art, Tyche Books	
2024	Kayla Kowalyk	The Passion of Ivan Rodriguez, cover art, Tyche Books	
2024	Jade Zhang	Tales & Feathers Magazine, Issue 1, cover art	
2025	Martine Nguyen	Augur 7.1 cover art	
2025	Lorna Antoniazzi	Augur 7.3 cover art	
2025	James Beveridge	Captains of Black and Brass, On Spec 9/24	
2025	Frances Philip	Augur 7.2 cover art	
2026	Ejiwa “Edge” Ebenebe*	Listen to Me and I’ll tell You a Story, Uncanny Magazine, Issue Sixty-Six	
2026	Janice Blaine	Dancing With the Holly King, On Spec Magazine, Issue #134	
2026	Alice M	Seance, Heartlines Spec, Issue7	
2026	Dan O’Driscoll	Lunar Base, On Spec Magazine, Issue #132	
2026	Lorna Antoniazzi	Starship Librarians, Tyche Books Ltd	

== Création artistique audiovisuelle ==
=== Winners and nominees ===
* Winners and joint winners

Year	Artist(s)	Work(s) (if specified)	Ref.
2011	Sybiline *	Covers of Solaris (#173) & (#175); Cover of Brins d'éternité (#26)	
2012	Valérie Bédard*	Unspecified	
2013	Ève Chabot*	Unspecified	
2014	Émilie Léger*	Unspecified	
2015	Émilie Léger*	Cover of 6, chalet des brumes (6, House of Mist); Cover of Dix ans d’éternité (10 Years of Eternity); Cover of Petits demons (Little Demons); Other unspecified works	
2016	Grégory Fromenteau*	Cover of Le Jeu du Démiurge (The Demiurge Game); Cover of Les Marches de la Lune morte (Steps of the Dead Moon); Other unspecified works	
2017	Émilie Léger*	Illustrations inside Solaris (#198) & (#199); Cover of Les Cendres de Sedna (The Ashes of Sedna)	
2017	Pascal Blanché	Cover of Brins d’éternité (#45)	
2017	Grégory Fromenteau	Cover of Les Monstres intérieurs (Indoor Monsters); Cover of Le Sang de Mirial (The Blood of Mirial); Cover of La Chute de Mirial (The Fall of Mirial)	
2017	Mary Khaos	Cover of Brins d’éternité (#43)	
2017	Laurine Spehne	Illustrations inside Solaris (#197), (#199) & (#200)	
2018	Denis Villeneuve*	Blade Runner 2049	
2018	Émilie Léger	Cover of Horrificorama	
2018	Sybiline	Cover of Brins d’éternité (#46)	
2018	Tomislav Tikulin	Illustrations inside Solaris (#201) & (#202)	
