= Aurora Award for Best Graphic Novel =

Canadian award for science fiction and fantasy

The Aurora Awards are granted annually by the Canadian SF and Fantasy Association and SFSF Boreal Inc. The Award for Best Graphic Novel (French: Meilleure bande dessinée) was first awarded in 2011 as a category for the English-language awards and introduced to the French-language awards in 2017.

Kari Maaren has won the English-language award the most times (5).

== English-language Award ==
=== Winners and nominees ===
* Winners and joint winners

| Year | Author(s)/Artist(s) | Work | Publisher/Publication | Ref. |
|---|---|---|---|---|
| 2011 | Ellipsis Stephens* | Goblins | goblinscomic.com | |
| 2011 | Ryan Sohmer & Lar DeSouza | Looking for Group (Vol.3) | ifgcomic.com | |
| 2011 | Von Allan | Stargazer (Vol. 1) | Von Allan | |
| 2011 | Emily Ragozzino | Tomboy Tara | tomboytara.com | |
| 2012 | Ellipsis Stephens* | Goblins | goblinscomic.com | |
| 2012 | G. M. B. Chomichuk, James Rewucki & John Toone | Imagination Manifesto (Book 2) | Alchemical | |
| 2012 | Alina Pete | Weregeek | weregeek.com | |
| 2013 | Alina Pete* | Weregeek | weregeek.com | |
| 2013 | Ellipsis Stephens | Goblins | goblinscomic.com | |
| 2013 | Ryan Sohmer & Lar DeSouza | Looking for Group | ifgcomic.com | |
| 2013 | G. M. B. Chomichuk | Raygun Gothic | Alchemical | |
| 2013 | Kari Maaren | West of Bathurst | westofbathurst.com | |
| 2014 | Peter Chiykowski* | Rock, Paper, Cynic | rockpapercynic.com | |
| 2014 | Ryan Sohmer & Lar DeSouza | Looking for Group | ifgcomic.com | |
| 2014 | Jeff Lemire | Sweet Tooth (Vol. 6) | Vertigo | |
| 2014 | Alina Pete | Weregeek | weregeek.com | |
| 2015 | Kari Maaren* | It Never Rains | itneverrainscomic.com | |
| 2015 | Justin Currie & G. M. B. Chomichuk | Cassie & Tonk | Chasing Artwork | |
| 2015 | G. M. B. Chomichuk | Raygun Gothic (Vol.2) | Alchemical | |
| 2015 | Dominic Bercier | Treadwell | Mirror | |
| 2015 | Jeff Lemire | Trillium | Vertigo | |
| 2016 | Vincent Marcone* | The Lady ParaNorma | ChiZine | |
| 2016 | J. M. Frey & Ryan Cole | Bloodsuckers (Vol. 2) | Toronto | |
| 2016 | Kate Larking & Finn Lucullen | Crash and Burn: Prologue | Astres | |
| 2016 | G. M. B. Chomichuk | Infinitum: Time Travel Noir | ChiZine | |
| 2016 | Kari Maaren | West of Bathurst: The Complete Collection | Kari Maaren | |
| 2017 | Margaret Atwood*, Johnnie Christmas* & Tamra Bonvillain* | Angel Catbird (Vol. 1) | Dark Horse | |
| 2017 | Kate Larking & Finn Lucullen | Crash and Burn | Astres | |
| 2017 | Crystal Yates | Earthsong | earthsongsaga.com | |
| 2017 | Kari Maaren | It Never Rains | itneverrainscomic.com | |
| 2017 | Alina Pete | Weregeek | weregeek.com | |
| 2018 | Peter Chiykowski* | Rock, Paper, Cynic | rockpapercynic.com | |
| 2018 | Kate Larking & Finn Lucullen | Crash and Burn | Astres | |
| 2018 | Ryan Harby & Laura Harby | Honey Dill | iamhoneydill.com | |
| 2018 | Kari Maaren | It Never Rains | itneverrainscomic.com | |
| 2018 | Jonathan Williams, Daniel Wong & Paris Alleyne | Riftworld Legends (#1-4) | Joe | |
| 2018 | Daniel Bercier | SIGNAL Saga (#0) | Mirror | |
| 2019 | Kari Maaren* | It Never Rains | itneverrainscomic.com | |
| 2019 | Kate Larking & Finn Lucullen | Crash and Burn | Astres | |
| 2019 | Cam Hayden & Rick Overwater | Futility: Orange Planet Horror | Coffin Hop | |
| 2019 | S. M. Beiko | Krampus Is My Boyfriend! | www.smbeiko.com | |
| 2019 | Aminder Dhaliwal | Woman World | Drawn and Quarterly | |
| 2020 | S. M. Beiko* | Krampus Is My Boyfriend! | www.smbeiko.com | |
| 2020 | Michael Nicoll Yahgulanaas | Carpe Fin | Douglas & McIntyre | |
| 2020 | Cole Pauls | Dakwäkãda Warriors | Conundrum | |
| 2020 | Margaret Atwood & Renee Nault | The Handmaid's Tale: The Graphic Novel | McClelland & Stewart | |
| 2020 | Kari Maaren | It Never Rains | itneverrainscomic.com | |
| 2021 | Kari Maaren* | It Never Rains | itneverrainscomic.com | |
| 2021 | Kate Larking & Finn Lucullen | Crash and Burn | Astres | |
| 2021 | Ellipsis Stephens | Goblins | goblinscomic.com | |
| 2021 | S. M. Beiko | Gothic Tales of Haunted Futures | Renegade Arts | |
| 2021 | S. M. Beiko | Krampus Is My Boyfriend! | www.smbeiko.com | |
| 2021 | Katherena Vermette | Northwest Resistance | Highwater | |
| 2022 | Kari Maaren* | It Never Rains | itneverrainscomic.com | |
| 2022 | Kate Larking & Finn Lucullen | Crash and Burn | Astres | |
| 2022 | Hunter Severn Bonyun & Sam Maggs | Critical Role: The Mighty Nein. Origins -- Jester Lavorre | Dark Horse | |
| 2022 | Ellipsis Stephens | Goblins | goblinscomic.com | |
| 2022 | Hiromi Goto & Ann Xu | Shadow Life | First Second | |
| 2022 | Mariko Tamaki & Gurihiru | Thor and Loki: Double Trouble | Marvel | |
| 2023 | Kari Maaren* | It Never Rains | itneverrainscomic.com | |
| 2023 | Michael DeForge | Birds of Maine | Drawn and Quarterly | |
| 2023 | Marika Kapogeorgakis | Cupcake War Machine | cupcakewarmachine.thecomicseries.com | |
| 2023 | Ellipsis Stephens | Goblins | goblinscomic.com | |
| 2023 | Michèle Laframboise | Shadow Life | Echofictions | |
| 2023 | Jeph Jacques | Questionable Content | questionablecontent.net | |
| 2023 | Ally Rom Colthoff | Wychwood | www.wychwoodcomic.com | |
| 2024 | Norm Konyu* | A Call to Cthulhu | Titan Nova | |
| 2024 | Kari Maaren | It Never Rains | itneverrainscomic.com | |
| 2024 | Vivian Zhou | Atana and the Firebird | HarperCollins | |
| 2024 | Maggie Lopez, Martin Powell & Ronn Sutton | Carson of Venus | Sequential Pulp Comics | |
| 2024 | Matt Kindt, Jeff Lemire & David Rubin | Cosmic Detective | Image Comics | |
| 2024 | Kyla Aiko & Joanna Cacao | The Secret of the Ravens | Clarion | |
| 2024 | Ally Rom Colthoff | Wychwood | www.wychwoodcomic.com | |
| 2025 | Ryan North, illustrated by Chris Fenoglio* | Star Trek Lower Decks: Warp Your Own Way | IDW | |
| 2025 | Aminder Dhaliwal | A Witch’s Guide to Burning | Drawn and Quarterly | |
| 2025 | Kari Maaren | It Never Rains | itneverrainscomic.com | |
| 2025 | Zac Thompson, illustrated by Daniel Irrizari, Brittany Peer & Gegê Schall | Cemetery Kids Don’t Die: Volume 1 | Oni | |
| 2025 | Richard Van Camp, illustrated by Christopher Shy | Wheetago War: Roth | Renegade Arts Entertainment | |
| 2025 | Vikki VanSickle, illustrated by Jensine Eckwall | Into the Goblin Market | Tundra | |
| 2026 | Kate Beaton* | Shark Girl | Quill and Quire | |
| 2026 | Vivian Zhou | Atana and the Jade Mermaid | HarperAlley | |
| 2026 | Ally Rom Colthoff | Bonds of the Forest | Augur Magazine, Issue 8.3 | |
| 2026 | Kari Maaren | It Never Rains | webcomic | |
| 2026 | Jeph Jacques | Questionable Content | webcomic | |

== French-language award ==
=== Winners and nominees ===
* Winners and joint winners

| Year | Author(s)/Artist(s) | Work | Publisher/Publication | Ref. |
|---|---|---|---|---|
| 2017 | Jean-Philippe Bergeron*, Damien Berger*, et al. | Bulle Contagion (Contagion Bubble) (Vol. 5) | BerBer | |
| 2017 | Cab* | Hiver nucléaire (Nuclear Winter) (Vol. 2) | Front Froid | |
| 2017 | Jiek Dion & RKSS | Turbo kid (Vol. 1) | Lounak | |
| 2018 | Francis Desharnais* & Val Mo* | Le seigneur de Saint-Rock (The Lord of Saint-Rock) | Front Froid | |
| 2018 | Anouk | L'armée du Soleil (Army of the Sun) | larmeedusoleil.anoukbd.com | |
| 2018 | François Vigeault | Titan | Pow Pow | |
