= Machine of Death =

Book by Ryan North

- Standard cover
- Author: Ryan North, Matthew Bennardo, and David Malki, editors
- Cover artist: Justin Van Genderen
- Language: English
- Genre: Science fiction
- Publisher: Bearstache Books
- Publication date: October 13, 2010
- Pages: 452
- ISBN: 978-0-9821671-2-0
- Followed by: This Is How You Die: Stories of the Inscrutable, Infallible, Inescapable Machine of Death

Machine of Death is a 2010 collection of science fiction short stories edited by Ryan North, Matthew Bennardo, and David Malki. The stories featured in Machine of Death were submitted by various writers since early 2007 and all focus on a device which can accurately predict the manner in which the user will eventually die. The book became a #1 bestseller on Amazon.com shortly after its initial publication, and was later released online under a free license.

== Premise ==
All of the stories featured in Machine of Death center around a device which, when provided with a blood sample, can identify the way a person will die. The machine relays this information by printing a short word or phrase, which serves as the title of each story, on a small card. The machine is never wrong, but often vague or cryptic. The premise was inspired by a cartoon from Ryan North's Dinosaur Comics.

== Release ==
The three editors solicited submissions, many of them from novice and unpublished or unknown writers, in early 2007. After failing to find a publisher willing to accept an anthology containing material by so many unknown authors, the editors self-published the book in late 2010.

Shortly after the book's publication, the editors announced "MOD-Day", encouraging buyers to purchase the book en masse on October 26 in an effort to reach #1 on the bestseller list on Amazon.com. The effort was successful. Malki described the feat as the literary equivalent of winning the Super Bowl. October 26 was also the release date of Broke: The Plan to Restore Our Trust, Truth, and Treasure by conservative Fox News commentator Glenn Beck. When Beck's book failed to reach #1 on that date, he complained that the anthology was part of a liberal "culture of death".

On November 2, 2010, the editors released the anthology under a Creative Commons Attribution–Noncommercial–Share Alike 3.0 license. Readings of stories from Machine of Death were released in podcast form on the book's website from November 10, 2010, to September 21, 2012. Submissions for a second volume were collected from May through July 2011.

== Stories ==
- "Flaming Marshmallow" written by Camille Alexa • illustrated by Shannon Wheeler
- "Fudge" by Kit Yona • Vera Brosgol
- "Torn Apart and Devoured by Lions" by Jeffrey C. Wells • Christopher Hastings
- "Despair" by K. M. Lawrence • Dean Trippe
- "Suicide" by David Michael Wharton • Brian McLachlan
- "Almond" by John Chernega • Paul Horn
- "Starvation" by M. Bennardo • Karl Kerschl
- "Cancer" by Camron Miller • Les McClaine
- "Firing Squad" by J Jack Unrau • Brandon Bolt
- "Vegetables" by Chris Cox • Kevin McShane
- "Piano" by Rafa Franco • Kean Soo
- "HIV Infection From Machine of Death Needle" by Brian Quinlan • KC Green
- "Exploded" by Tom Francis • Jesse Reklaw
- "Not Waving But Drowning" by Erin McKean • Carly Monardo
- "Improperly Prepared Blowfish" by Gord Sellar • Jeffrey Brown
- "Love Ad Nauseum" by Sherri Jacobsen • Kate Beaton
- "Murder and Suicide, Respectively" by Ryan North • Senna Diaz
- "Cancer" by David Malki • Danielle Corsetto
- "Aneurysm" by Alexander Danner • Dorothy Gambrell
- "Exhaustion From Having Sex With a Minor" by Ben "Yahtzee" Croshaw • Cameron Stewart
- "After Many Years, Stops Breathing, While Asleep, With Smile On Face" by William Grallo • Scott C.
- "Killed by Daniel" by Julia Wainwright • Marcus Thiele
- "Friendly Fire" by Douglas J. Lane • Kelly Tindall
- "Nothing" by Pelotard • John Allison
- "Cocaine and Painkillers" by David Malki • Jess Fink
- "Loss of Blood" by Jeff Stautz • Kris Straub
- "Prison Knife Fight" by Shaenon K. Garrity • Roger Langridge
- "While Trying to Save Another" by Daliso Chaponda • Dylan Meconis
- "Miscarriage" by James L. Sutter • Rene Engström
- "Shot by Sniper" by Bartholomew von Klick • John Keogh
- "Heat Death of the Universe" by James Foreman • Ramón K. Pérez
- "Drowning" by C. E. Guimont • Adam Koford
- "?" by Randall Munroe • Kazu Kibuishi
- "Cassandra" by T. J. Radcliffe • Matt Haley

Additional artist contributors whose illustrations are not tied to specific stories include Katie Sekelsky and Mitch Clem.
