= Lulu.com =

Company offering self-publishing, printing, and distribution services

Lulu Press, Inc.
- Type: Privately held company
- Industry: Publishing
- Genre: Self-publishing
- Founded: 2002; 24 years ago
- Founder: Bob Young
- Headquarters: Morrisville, North Carolina, United States
- Key people: Craig Petersen (CEO)
- Products: Books, e-books, photo-books, calendars
- Services: Print on demand and e-book publishing
- Website: Official website

Lulu Press, Inc., doing business under trade name Lulu, is an online print-on-demand, self-publishing, and distribution platform. By 2014, it had issued approximately two million titles.

The company's founder is Red Hat co-founder Bob Young; he also was CEO for many years. As of 2022, the company's 20th anniversary, Young had handed CEO duties to Kathy Hensgen. The company's headquarters are in Morrisville, North Carolina.

Previous logo

== Overview ==
=== Products ===
In 2009, Lulu began publishing and distributing ebooks. Lulu also prints and publishes calendars and photo books. In 2017, Lulu introduced an Open Access print-on-demand service.

=== Process ===
The author of a title receives an 80% royalty for print books and a 90% royalty for eBooks when sold.

=== Replay Photos ===
In January 2014, Lulu announced that it had acquired Durham (NC)–based sports photography company Replay Photos. Replay Photos sells licensed images of collegiate and professional sports teams as photographic prints, custom framed photos, photos on canvas, and original wall art.

=== Digital Rights Management (DRM) ===
Lulu's final phase for their Digital Rights Management (DRM) Retirement project was released July 2, 2013. Prior to January 15, 2013, a Lulu author could choose to apply Digital Rights Management (DRM) protection to their PDF or EPUB.

=== LuluJr. ===
In 2014, Lulu launched LuluJr., after buying out Creations by You, which enables children to become published authors. Lulu Jr. products include My Comic Book and IlluStory. On January 31. 2026, LuluJr no longer sells physical kits on their site but completed kits can still be redeemed as of that date.

== Lulu Blooker Prize ==
The Lulu Blooker Prize was a literary award for "blooks" (books based on blogs). It was awarded in 2006 and 2007 and sponsored by Lulu. An overall prize was awarded, based on the winners of three subsidiary categories: non-fiction, fiction, and comics. The Lulu Blooker Prize was open to any "blook" that had been published "to date" (i.e., by the entry deadline) by any publisher.

=== 2006 ===
The first competition saw 89 entries from over a dozen countries. A panel of three judges decided the winners: Cory Doctorow, Chair of Judges; Paul Jones; and Robin "Roblimo" Miller.

==== Winners ====
- Julie and Julia: 365 Days, 524 Recipes, 1 Tiny Apartment Kitchen by Julie Powell (main prize, non-fiction)
- Four and Twenty Blackbirds by Cherie Priest (fiction)
- Totally Boned: A Joe and Monkey Collection by Zach Miller (comics, self-published through Lulu)

==== Runners-up ====
- Biodiesel Power by Lyle Estill (runner up, non-fiction, see biodiesel)
- Hackoff.com: An Historic Murder Mystery Set in the Internet Bubble and Rubble by Tom Evslin (runner up, fiction)
- Dinosaur Comics: Huge Eyes, Beaks, Intelligence, and Ambition by Ryan North (runner up, comics)

=== 2007 ===
The 2007 competition had 110 entries from 15 countries. The number of judges was increased to five: Paul Jones (chair), Arianna Huffington, Julie Powell (2006 overall winner), Rohit Gupta, and Nick Cohen.

==== Winners ====
- My War: Killing Time in Iraq by Colby Buzzell (Overall Winner and Non-Fiction Winner)
- The Doorbells of Florence by Andrew Losowsky (Fiction Winner)
- Mom's Cancer by Brian Fies (Comics Winner)

==== Runners-up ====
- My Secret: A PostSecret Book by Frank Warren (Non-Fiction)
- Island: A Zombie Novel by David Wellington (Fiction)

== See also ==
- Smashwords
