= My War (disambiguation) =

My War is a 1984 Black Flag album.

My War may also refer to:

- My War (The Bear Quartet album), a 2000 album
- My War: Killing Time in Iraq, a 2005 book by Colby Buzzell
- My War (film), a 2016 Chinese historical war drama film
- Meri Jung (lit. 'My War'), a 1985 Indian Hindi-language film
- Meri Jung, Hindi title for the 2004 Indian Telugu-language film Mass
- Meri Jung, Hindi title for the 2013 Indian Telugu film Shadow
- "My War" (song), called "Boku no Sensou" in Japanese, the opening theme for the anime Attack on Titan's fourth season
