= This Is How You Die =

2013 short story collection

This Is How You Die: Stories of the Inscrutable, Infallible, Inescapable Machine of Death
- First edition
- Author: Ryan North, Matthew Bennardo, and David Malki, editors
- Language: English
- Genre: Science fiction
- Publisher: Grand Central Publishing
- Publication date: July 16, 2013
- Pages: 503
- Preceded by: Machine of Death

This Is How You Die: Stories of the Inscrutable, Infallible, Inescapable Machine of Death is a 2013 anthology of science fiction short stories, which is a follow-up to Machine of Death, edited by Ryan North, Matthew Bennardo, and David Malki.

== Reception ==
Kirkus Reviews called it "funny, frightening, (and) clever", while Publishers Weekly found it to be "fun, thoughtful, and sometimes dark". The A.V. Club noted the many "strikingly different perspectives" of how society would be affected by the Machine, and lauded the book as "a celebration of creativity, exploring how impressively far one idea can be stretched without breaking".

== Table of contents ==
There are 31 stories contained within This Is How You Die:

- "Old Age, Surrounded by Loved Ones" written by Nathan Burgoine • illustrated by Danica Novgorodoff
- "Rock and Roll" written by Toby W. Rush • Meredith Gran
- "Natural Causes" written by Rhiannon Kelly • Leela Wagner
- "Shiv Sena Riot" written by Ryan Estrada • Ben McSweeney
- "Zephyr" written by George Page III • c.billadeau
- "Execution by Beheading" written by Chandler Kaiden • Mike Dawson
- "Lazarus Reactor Fission Sequence" written by Tom Francis • Les McClaine
- "Drowning Burning Falling Flying" written by Grace Seybold • Carla Speed McNeil
- "Conflagration" written by D.L.E. Roger • Sam Bosma
- "Screaming, Crying, Alone, and Afraid" written by Daliso Chaponda • Greg Ruth
- "Apitoxin" written by John Takis • Indigo Kelleigh
- "Blue Fever" written by Ada Hoffmann • Alice Duke
- "Tetrapod" written by Rebecca Black • Carly Monardo
- "Machine of Death" written by Karen Stay Ahlstrom • Alexandra Douglass
- "Monsters from the Deep" written by David Malki • Mike Peterson
- "Toxoplasmosis of the Brain; Candidiasis of the Esophagus; Candidiasis of the Trachea; Candidiasis of the Bronchi; Candidiasis of the Lungs; Kaposi's Sarcoma; Pneumonia; Tuberculosis; Stab Wound in the Belly; and Bus Accident" written by Gord Sellar • Nick Abadzis
- "Cancer" written by Ryan North • Lissa Treiman
- "Two One Six" written by Marleigh Norton • Shari Chankhamma
- "Blunt Force Trauma Delivered by Spouse" written by Liz Argall • Emily Partridge
- "Meat Eater" written by John Chernega and Bill Chernega • Dana Wulfekotte
- "Made into Delicious Cheeseburger" written by Sarah Pavis • Becky Dreistadt
- "Your Choice" written by Richard Salter • Graham Annable
- "In Battle, Alone and Soon Forgotten" written by Ed Turner • Tony Cliff
- "Lake Titicaca" written by M. Bennardo • Dustin Harbin
- "In Sleep" written by Ren Warom • Claire Hummel
- "Cecile" written by Hollan Lane • Ramón Pérez
- "La Mort d'un Roturier" written by Martin Livings • Aaron Diaz
- "Not Applicable" written by Kyle Shoenfeld • Chris Schweizer
- "Peacefully" written by M.J. Leitch • Tyson Hesse
- "Old Age" written by Brigita Orel • Braden Lamb
- "Furnace" written by Erika Hammerschmidt • Trudy Cooper
