= Colby Buzzell =

American blogger and author (born 1976)

- Born: July 17, 1976 (age 50); California, U.S.
- Military career
- Allegiance: United States
- Branch: United States Army

Colby Buzzell (born July 17, 1976, in California) is an American author, blogger and former United States Army soldier.

Buzzell grew up in San Ramon, California, and enlisted in the United States Army at the age of 26. Prior to joining the U.S. Army he described his life as engaging in a lot of drinking, drug use, dead-end jobs and a minor criminal record. He was very optimistic about his Army service and was determined to follow the Army recruiting slogan of "Be All That You Can Be". He joined the service as an infantryman and spent 2003–2004 in Iraq, assigned to a Stryker Brigade Combat Team. In his book he expresses a great deal of enthusiasm about the benefits of wheels over traditional treaded armor in urban settings.

It was in Iraq that Buzzell began publishing a blog under the title "CBFTW", "Colby Buzzel Fuck The War", as a replacement for his habitual journaling back in the States. The milblog gained popularity quickly because, as an anonymous blogger, Buzzell was able to share more lucid experiences than an embedded journalist, and he was also able to share a bit more of the truth than the Army was able to.

Buzzell's blog gained recognition for its realistic portrayal of gripping first-hand accounts of the war in Iraq. This 'milblog' won praise as “an unfiltered, often ferocious expression of his boots-on-the-ground view of the Iraq war."

Colby published a book on his experiences entitled My War: Killing Time in Iraq, combining narrative, blog entries, and emails that evolved from his blog over time. The book received positive reviews and has been recommended for public libraries.

In 2004, Buzzell was profiled in Esquire's "Best and Brightest" issue and became a regular Esquire contributor until about 2015. In 2007, Buzzell received the 2007 Lulu Blooker Prize for My War: Killing Time in Iraq. He also contributed to the film Operation Homecoming: Writing the Wartime Experience.

In 2008, Buzzell was recalled for active duty. After he arrived at his post, he was examined by the medical staff at Fort Benning and marked "not deployable" due to post-traumatic stress disorder.

In 2011, Buzzell wrote the book Lost in America: A Dead-End Journey, published by HarperCollins, about coping with his post-traumatic stress disorder by taking a road trip to nowhere, all the while thinking about his newborn son, wife, and recently deceased mother.

In 2015, he published a short-story collection, Thank You For Being Expendable: And Other Experiences, with Byliner.

His most recent publication was in 2017.
