= Star Trek: Lower Decks =

- Genre: Adult animation; Adventure; Comedy; Science fiction
- Created by: Mike McMahan
- Based on: Star Trek by Gene Roddenberry
- Showrunner: Mike McMahan
- Voices of: Tawny Newsome; Jack Quaid; Noël Wells; Eugene Cordero; Dawnn Lewis; Jerry O'Connell; Fred Tatasciore; Gillian Vigman
- Composer: Chris Westlake
- Country of origin: United States
- Original language: English
- No. of seasons: 5
- No. of episodes: 50

Production
- Executive producers: Alex Kurtzman; Heather Kadin; Rod Roddenberry; Trevor Roth; Katie Krentz; Mike McMahan
- Running time: 23–30 minutes
- Production companies: CBS Eye Animation Productions; Secret Hideout; Important Science; Roddenberry Entertainment; Titmouse, Inc.

Original release
- Network: CBS All Access
- Release: August 6 – October 8, 2020
- Network: Paramount+
- Release: August 12, 2021 – December 19, 2024

Related
- Star Trek TV series

Star Trek: Lower Decks is an American adult animated science fiction television series created by Mike McMahan for the streaming service CBS All Access (later rebranded as Paramount+). It is the ninth Star Trek series and debuted in 2020 as part of executive producer Alex Kurtzman's expanded Star Trek Universe. The franchise's first animated series since Star Trek: The Animated Series concluded in 1974, and also its first comedy, Lower Decks follows the low-ranking support crew of the starship Cerritos in the 24th century.

Tawny Newsome, Jack Quaid, Noël Wells, and Eugene Cordero voice the lower decks crew members of the Cerritos, with Dawnn Lewis, Jerry O'Connell, Fred Tatasciore, and Gillian Vigman providing voices for the ship's senior officers. Work on an animated Star Trek series began in June 2018. McMahan joined as creator and showrunner by that October, when Lower Decks was ordered for two seasons by All Access. The series is produced by CBS Eye Animation Productions in association with Secret Hideout, Important Science, Roddenberry Entertainment, and animation studio Titmouse. The latter began work by February 2019, and the main cast was announced that July. Production on the first two seasons shifted to taking place remotely in March 2020 due to the COVID-19 pandemic. The series features many connections and references to past Star Trek series.

Star Trek: Lower Decks premiered on CBS All Access on August 6, 2020, and its 10-episode first season was released weekly through October 2020. The second season was released on Paramount+ from August to October 2021, a third season was released from August to October 2022, a fourth season was released from September to November 2023, and a fifth and final season was released from October to December 2024. The series has received positive reviews and several accolades, including three Primetime Creative Arts Emmy Award nominations and a Hugo Award.

== Premise ==
Star Trek: Lower Decks is set in the late 24th century in the Star Trek universe, where Earth is part of the multi-species United Federation of Planets. The Federation's military and exploration division, Starfleet, operates a fleet of starships that travel the galaxy establishing contact with alien races; Lower Decks focuses on one of Starfleet's least important starships, the USS Cerritos. Unlike previous Star Trek series, whose principal characters are typically starship captains and other senior officers, Lower Decks focuses on the missions and adventures of the "lower deckers", low-ranking officers with menial jobs, while the captain and other senior staff appear as supporting characters.

== Episodes ==
Seasons of Star Trek: Lower Decks
Season	Episodes	Originally released		
Season	Episodes	First released	Last released	Network
1	10	August 6, 2020	October 8, 2020	CBS All Access
2	10	August 12, 2021	October 14, 2021	Paramount+
3	10	August 25, 2022	October 27, 2022	Paramount+
4	10	September 7, 2023	November 2, 2023	Paramount+
5	10	October 24, 2024	December 19, 2024	Paramount+

=== Season 1 (2020) ===
Star Trek: Lower Decks season 1 episodes
No. overall	No. in season	Title	Directed by	Written by	Original release date
1	1	"Second Contact"	Barry J. Kelly	Mike McMahan	August 6, 2020
2	2	"Envoys"	Kim Arndt	Chris Kula	August 13, 2020
3	3	"Temporal Edict"	Bob Suarez	Dave Ihlenfeld & David Wright	August 20, 2020
4	4	"Moist Vessel"	Barry J. Kelly	Ann Kim	August 27, 2020
5	5	"Cupid's Errant Arrow"	Kim Arndt	Ben Joseph	September 3, 2020
6	6	"Terminal Provocations"	Bob Suarez	John Cochran	September 10, 2020
7	7	"Much Ado About Boimler"	Barry J. Kelly	M. Willis	September 17, 2020
8	8	"Veritas"	Kim Arndt	Garrick Bernard	September 24, 2020
9	9	"Crisis Point"	Bob Suarez	Ben Rodgers	October 1, 2020
10	10	"No Small Parts"	Barry J. Kelly	Mike McMahan	October 8, 2020

=== Season 2 (2021) ===
Star Trek: Lower Decks season 2 episodes
No. overall	No. in season	Title	Directed by	Written by	Original release date
11	1	"Strange Energies"	Jason Zurek	Mike McMahan	August 12, 2021
12	2	"Kayshon, His Eyes Open"	Kim Arndt	Chris Kula	August 19, 2021
13	3	"We'll Always Have Tom Paris"	Bob Suarez	M. Willis	August 26, 2021
14	4	"Mugato, Gumato"	Jason Zurek	Ben Rodgers	September 2, 2021
15	5	"An Embarrassment of Dooplers"	Kim Arndt	Dave Ihlenfeld & David Wright	September 9, 2021
16	6	"The Spy Humongous"	Bob Suarez	John Cochran	September 16, 2021
17	7	"Where Pleasant Fountains Lie"	Jason Zurek	Garrick Bernard	September 23, 2021
18	8	"I, Excretus"	Kim Arndt	Ann Kim	September 30, 2021
19	9	"wej Duj"	Bob Suarez	Kathryn Lyn	October 7, 2021
20	10	"First First Contact"	Jason Zurek	Mike McMahan	October 14, 2021

=== Season 3 (2022) ===
Star Trek: Lower Decks season 3 episodes
No. overall	No. in season	Title	Directed by	Written by	Original release date
21	1	"Grounded"	Jason Zurek	Chris Kula	August 25, 2022
22	2	"The Least Dangerous Game"	Michael Mullen	Garrick Bernard	September 1, 2022
23	3	"Mining the Mind's Mines"	Fill Marc Sagadraca	Brian D. Bradley	September 8, 2022
24	4	"Room for Growth"	Jason Zurek	John Cochran	September 15, 2022
25	5	"Reflections"	Michael Mullen	Mike McMahan	September 22, 2022
26	6	"Hear All, Trust Nothing"	Fill Marc Sagadraca	Grace Parra Janney	September 29, 2022
27	7	"A Mathematically Perfect Redemption"	Jason Zurek	Ann Kim	October 6, 2022
28	8	"Crisis Point 2: Paradoxus"	Michael Mullen	Ben Rodgers	October 13, 2022
29	9	"Trusted Sources"	Fill Marc Sagadraca	Ben M. Waller	October 20, 2022
30	10	"The Stars at Night"	Jason Zurek	Mike McMahan	October 27, 2022

=== Season 4 (2023) ===
Star Trek: Lower Decks season 4 episodes
No. overall	No. in season	Title	Directed by	Written by	Original release date
31	1	"Twovix"	Barry J. Kelly; Jason Zurek	Mike McMahan	September 7, 2023
32	2	"I Have No Bones Yet I Must Flee"	Megan Lloyd	Aaron Burdette	September 7, 2023
33	3	"In the Cradle of Vexilon"	Brandon Williams	Ben Waller	September 14, 2023
34	4	"Something Borrowed, Something Green"	Bob Suarez	Grace Parra Janney	September 21, 2023
35	5	"Empathological Fallacies"	Megan Lloyd	Jamie Loftus	September 28, 2023
36	6	"Parth Ferengi's Heart Place"	Brandon Williams	Cullen Crawford	October 5, 2023
37	7	"A Few Badgeys More"	Bob Suarez	Edgar Momplaisir	October 12, 2023
38	8	"Caves"	Megan Lloyd	Ben Rodgers	October 19, 2023
39	9	"The Inner Fight"	Brandon Williams	Mike McMahan	October 26, 2023
40	10	"Old Friends, New Planets"	Bob Suarez	May Darmon	November 2, 2023

=== Season 5 (2024) ===
Star Trek: Lower Decks season 5 episodes
No. overall	No. in season	Title	Directed by	Written by	Original release date
41	1	"Dos Cerritos"	Megan Lloyd	Aaron Burdette	October 24, 2024
42	2	"Shades of Green"	Bob Suarez	Keith Foglesong	October 24, 2024
43	3	"The Best Exotic Nanite Hotel"	Brandon Williams	Stephanie Amante-Ritter	October 31, 2024
44	4	"A Farewell To Farms"	Megan Lloyd	Diana Tay	November 7, 2024
45	5	"Starbase 80?!"	Bob Suarez	May Darmon	November 14, 2024
46	6	"Of Gods and Angles"	Brandon Williams	Aaron Burdette	November 21, 2024
47	7	"Fully Dilated"	Megan Lloyd	Andrew Mueth	November 28, 2024
48	8	"Upper Decks"	Bob Suarez	Cullen Crawford	December 5, 2024
49	9	"Fissure Quest"	Brandon Williams	Lauren McGuire	December 12, 2024
50	10	"The New Next Generation"	Megan Lloyd	Mike McMahan	December 19, 2024

== Cast and characters ==
- Tawny Newsome as Beckett Mariner:
  A human ensign aboard the USS Cerritos and the daughter of Captain Freeman. Newsome described Mariner as an irreverent rule-breaker who has been demoted several times, though she is actually "very good at all things Starfleet". She is promoted to lieutenant (junior grade) in the fourth season. The character is named after showrunner Mike McMahan's sister, Beckett Mariner McMahan.
- Jack Quaid as Brad Boimler:
  A human ensign aboard the Cerritos, Boimler is a stickler for the rules and will need to learn how to improvise if he is to become a captain one day. He is promoted to lieutenant (junior grade) in the fourth season. Quaid said the character would "nail the written portion of the driving test with flying colors but once it actually got to him being in the car, it would be a complete and total disaster."
- Noël Wells as D'Vana Tendi:
  An Orion ensign in the medical bay aboard the Cerritos, Tendi is a big fan of Starfleet, and is thrilled to be on a starship. She is new to the Cerritos at the start of the series, and helps introduce the audience to the setting and characters. McMahan said he would act like Tendi if he ever got to work on a starship. She is promoted to lieutenant (junior grade) in the fourth season.
- Eugene Cordero as Sam Rutherford:
  A human ensign aboard the Cerritos, Rutherford is adjusting to a new cyborg implant. McMahan compared Rutherford to the Star Trek: The Next Generation character Geordi La Forge, saying they are both "amazing at engineering stuff" but Rutherford does not always solve the problem like Geordi because he is still learning. He is promoted to lieutenant (junior grade) in the fourth season.
- Dawnn Lewis as Carol Freeman:
  The human captain of the Cerritos and Mariner's mother. McMahan described her as a capable Starfleet captain whose starship is not very important. Freeman initially does not want Mariner to be on the Cerritos and is looking for a reason to have her transferred to another ship, but over the course of the series the pair grow closer as they discover things that they have in common.
- Jerry O'Connell as Jack Ransom:
  The human first officer of the Cerritos whom McMahan compared to Next Generation's William Riker, if he was on speed and had less shame.
- Fred Tatasciore as Shaxs:
  A Bajoran tactical officer aboard the Cerritos. Shaxs dies sacrificing himself for Rutherford at the end of the first season, but he returns to life in the second season in a storyline that plays on the numerous times and ways that characters have been resurrected in previous Star Trek series.
- Gillian Vigman as T'Ana:
  A Caitian doctor and head of medical aboard the Cerritos. McMahan described her as a "good doctor, but she's an unpleasant cat". Including a Caitian in the series is a reference to Star Trek: The Animated Series which also features a member of that species, M'Ress.

== Production ==
=== Development ===
In June 2018, after becoming sole showrunner of the series Star Trek: Discovery, Alex Kurtzman signed a five-year overall deal with CBS Television Studios to expand the Star Trek franchise beyond Discovery to several new series, miniseries, and animated series. Aaron Baiers of Kurtzman's production company Secret Hideout brought Mike McMahan—the head writer of popular animated comedy Rick and Morty—to a general meeting about animation in Star Trek. Baiers and McMahan had been television assistants together when McMahan was running the Twitter fan account @TNG_S8, suggesting stories for a theoretical eighth season of Star Trek: The Next Generation. McMahan was asked what his dream Star Trek series would be, and pitched a series following "the people who put the yellow cartridge in the food replicator so a banana can come out the other end".

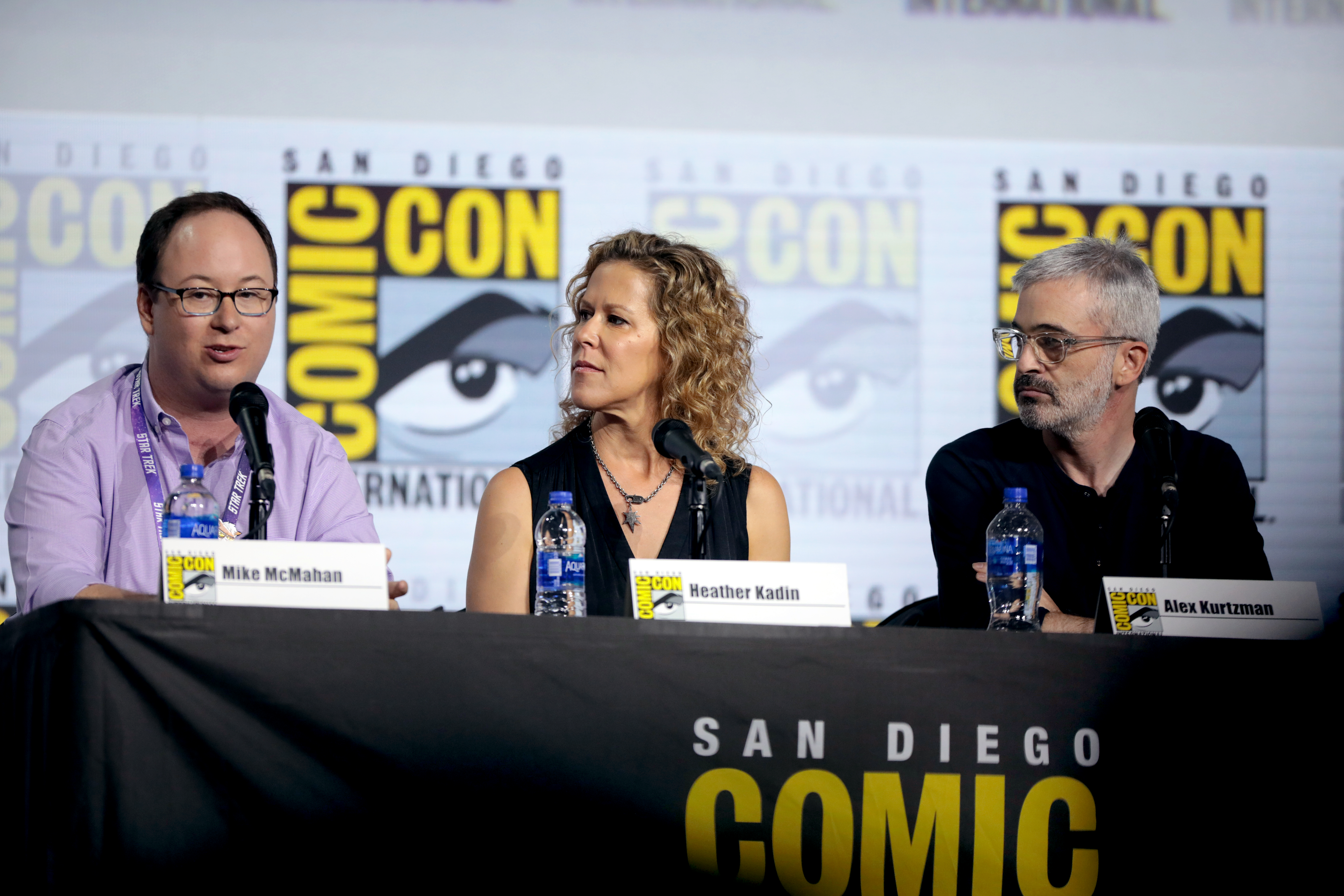
(L-R) Creator and showrunner Mike McMahan promoting Lower Decks at the 2019 San Diego Comic-Con with executive producers Heather Kadin and Alex Kurtzman

After McMahan won over executives with his initial pitch, Secret Hideout moved forward with the series. It was marketed to different platforms and networks before being picked up by CBS All Access, the streaming service that was releasing Discovery, who officially ordered two seasons on October 25, 2018. Titled Star Trek: Lower Decks, it was the service's first original animated series and the first animated Star Trek series since the 1973–74 series Star Trek: The Animated Series. McMahan was set to create, write, and executive produce alongside Kurtzman, Secret Hideout's Heather Kadin, Rod Roddenberry (the son of Star Trek creator Gene Roddenberry) and Trevor Roth of Roddenberry Entertainment, and veteran animation executive-turned-producer Katie Krentz of the newly formed CBS Eye Animation Productions. In January 2019, Kurtzman said the series would not be "Rick and Morty in the world of Star Trek" and would have its own tone, but would "skew slightly more adult". In July, McMahan said the first season consisted of 10 episodes and would be released in 2020.

By late March 2020, work on the series was taking place remotely due to the COVID-19 pandemic forcing staff to work from home. In May, McMahan said animation was "uniquely suited for this moment" since the series' animators could continue work on the series from home. In July, All Access scheduled the series to premiere in August 2020. The streaming service was rebranded Paramount+ in 2021. A third season was ordered in April ahead of the second-season premiere that August. The third season was confirmed for a late-2022 release when a fourth season was ordered in January 2022, and the fourth season was confirmed for a mid-2023 release when a fifth season was ordered in March 2023. That October, McMahan said he wanted to keep making the series but further seasons beyond the fifth were not guaranteed, particularly after Paramount+ cancelled fellow animated series Star Trek: Prodigy and confirmed the final seasons of Discovery and Star Trek: Picard. He was open to continuing the series in other media, including films, comics, books, and video games. In April 2024, Paramount confirmed that the fifth season would be the last for the series. McMahan and Kurtzman expressed their hope that the characters' stories would continue beyond the end of the series.

=== Writing ===
The series begins in 2380, one year after the events of the film Star Trek: Nemesis (2002), and focuses on the support crew of a starship rather than the main bridge crew like previous Star Trek series did. McMahan set the series shortly after Nemesis, which was the last Star Trek film in the era of The Next Generation, due to his love of The Next Generation. The series is named after the Next Generation episode "Lower Decks", which also focuses on the lives of lower-ranking starship personnel and which McMahan said was his favorite episode of any Star Trek series; the episode was the first thing McMahan showed the Lower Decks writers' room when they started work on the series. McMahan was inspired by the social side-stories in episodes of The Next Generation, and Kurtzman explained that the "A story" of a typical Star Trek episode would be taking place in the background of each Lower Decks episode, so "huge, crazy, crazy shit is going on in the background and that's super peripheral to the story that you're actually focusing on". Kurtzman felt this made the series a unique addition to the franchise. Starting in late 2019, astrophysicist Erin Macdonald joined the Star Trek franchise as a science advisor. Macdonald said each series was on a "spectrum of science to fiction" and the Lower Decks writers approached science from the perspective of being able to "get away with a lot more" than the live-action series, so her role was mostly to fix dialogue to ensure the correct terms were used rather than strive for complete scientific accuracy.

The main setting of the series is the starship USS Cerritos, a "California-class" ship. This ship class, created for Lower Decks, is a class of support starships that work with larger starships like those seen previously in the franchise, but are not "important enough" to have appeared on screen before. McMahan described the mission of the Cerritos as "Second Contact": after Starfleet has made first contact with a new alien civilization and invited it to join the Federation, the crew of support ships like the Cerritos arrive to find "all the good places to eat [and set up] the communications stuff". McMahan wanted California-class ships to be named after Californian cities, and chose the city of Cerritos because he otherwise only knew it for local Cerritos Auto Square car dealership advertisements. He wanted to give the city "one more thing other than just being the home of the Auto Square".

McMahan did not want the humor to be "punching down on Trek" and focused on telling Star Trek stories where the characters happen to be funny. Writers from different comedic backgrounds and with different levels of Star Trek interest were hired. Kurtzman described Lower Decks as a love letter to Star Trek, and it is filled with many references to other Star Trek series. McMahan said these were there to "create a rich, vibrant, fun expression of the world of Star Trek in that era" rather than just be Easter eggs for fans to pick through. It was important to the team that these not distract from the emotional storytelling and also fit within established canon, with Star Trek author David Alan Mack consulting on the series to ensure that it fit into the franchise. McMahan hoped that references to The Animated Series specifically would honor it as the franchise's first animated series. The characters often use the real-world titles of past Star Trek episodes when referencing those events, with McMahan explaining that the personal logs of famous characters are given similar in-universe titles to the episodes they are from. The franchise established that "Star Trek characters watch Star Trek" in the series finale of Star Trek: Enterprise, where the events of an earlier mission are recreated with a hologram, and McMahan felt many events from past series would be common knowledge within Starfleet. Acknowledging this allowed the main characters to be "geeks for Star Trek", which let Lower Decks be a "Rosetta Stone" connecting all previous Star Trek projects.

=== Casting and voice recording ===
Kurtzman stated in June 2019 that the series would mostly focus on new characters, but there was potential for characters from previous Star Trek series to appear at some point. The next month, McMahan announced the main cast and characters, including ensigns serving in the "lower decks" of the Cerritos—Tawny Newsome as Beckett Mariner, Jack Quaid as Brad Boimler, Noël Wells as D'Vana Tendi, and Eugene Cordero as Sam Rutherford—and the ship's bridge crew who believe "the show is about them, but it's not"—Dawnn Lewis as Captain Carol Freeman, Jerry O'Connell as first officer Commander Jack Ransom, Fred Tatasciore as security chief Lieutenant Shaxs, and Gillian Vigman as chief medical officer Dr. T'Ana. Voice-overs for each episode are recorded before any animation work is done, with the recordings edited together into what McMahan described as an "old-timey radio play version of the episode". Initially, actors were recorded together such as Newsome and Quaid, but this stopped during production on the first season due to the COVID-19 pandemic. This became one of the biggest challenges for the series during the pandemic, with a need to use remote recording equipment in each actor's house. Newsome used a recording studio that she already had in her home.

=== Animation and design ===
Independent animation studio Titmouse provides the animation for the series. "Board teams" draw a rough version of the episode in black-and-white based on the initial "radio play" version of the voice actor recordings. These are put together as an animatic which the animators use as a basis for the final animation with full details and colors. Juno Lee was supervising director for the first season, with first-season episodic director Barry J. Kelly taking over as supervising director with the second season. Titmouse CCO Antonio Canobbio guided the series' overall visual style.

The main characters of Lower Decks (L-R): D'Vana Tendi, Sam Rutherford, Beckett Mariner, and Brad Boimler. Creator Mike McMahan wanted them to have a "prime time look" similar to series like The Simpsons, while the uniforms were based on unused designs for the 1994 film Star Trek Generations.

McMahan wanted the series' animation style to reflect the look of "prime time animated comedy" series that he grew up with, such as The Simpsons and Futurama, as well as previous comedy series that he had worked on such as Rick and Morty. This included a "prime time look" for the characters based on the "every-man vibe of The Simpsons" which meant that even the alien characters felt human and grounded. However, he wanted backgrounds and environments to be more detailed than usual for prime time animation, reflecting the designs of the Next Generation era of Star Trek for the series' sets, starships, cinematography, and character movements. The team tried to follow the same rules that would apply to a live-action Star Trek series set in 2380, and used the wiki encyclopedia Memory Alpha and other fan resources to stay accurate to the eras's original designs. The animators also watched episodes of The Next Generation while working on the series, which uses the same blue font as The Next Generation for its credits. The opening title sequence features the Cerritos flying through Next Generation-like situations with a sweeping musical score, but with twists such as it being sucked into a vortex and immediately turning around after arriving at a battle. The Cerritos crew's uniforms are based on unused designs for the film Star Trek Generations (1994).

Kelly said the Cerritos was designed to compare favorably to the franchise's live-action starships, with adjustments then made to fit the show's animation style. The Cerritos is a Next Generation version of the USS Reliant from the film Star Trek II: The Wrath of Khan (1982), McMahan's favorite Star Trek starship. The California-class starships seen in the series feature the same colors as the uniforms, with yellow for engineering, blue for medical, and red for command (the Cerritos is yellow). Elements of the LCARS computer system from The Next Generation were included in the Cerritos's design, with "those swooping shapes [being] part of the overall architecture of the ship" as well as the carpet, walls, and ceiling. The particles of transporter beams were also drawn to be "little pill-shaped tubes" in the LCARS style, while actual LCARS displays are featured throughout the ship as well. Michael Okuda, who designed the LCARS system for The Next Generation, consulted with the animation team on the series' LCARS designs and colors.

Once the animation is completed, the last element of the series is the final sound design. McMahan noted that the same level of care was applied to the series' sound design as its animation in terms of honoring "legacy" elements from previous Star Trek series. Sounds from earlier in the franchise that were studied and replicated include those for existing technology, such as the noises made by different phasers, the different sounds made when making or receiving a call using a Starfleet badge, or the sound of the ships' warp core. They also include the general "room tone" of different areas of the ship, such as the bridge, different hallways, and crew quarters. General sound design was also required, such as for the sound of characters' footsteps. Once the sound design is completed, these sounds are mixed with the voice recordings and score in a final mix for the episodes.

=== Music ===
In January 2020, frequent Star Trek composer Jeff Russo said it might not be possible for him to compose the score for Lower Decks due to his workload and the large number of Star Trek series being produced at the same time. He suggested that he could oversee some other composers for Lower Decks and the other Star Trek series if Kurtzman asked him to. In July, Chris Westlake was revealed to be the composer after working with McMahan on Solar Opposites. McMahan said Westlake's score sounded like a traditional Star Trek score that fit within the fast-paced, comedic style of Lower Decks. Westlake felt it would be funnier if sincere music scored the comedic series, which is why the main theme includes a choir. He wrote six or seven different main theme ideas that were narrowed down to two, one being energetic and the other having a slower, more stately feel; the final theme is "between" these two. A soundtrack album featuring music from the first two seasons was released by Lakeshore Records on October 8, 2021. All music composed by Chris Westlake:

Vol. 1 (Original Series Soundtrack)
No.	Title	Length
1.	"Main Titles"	1:10
2.	"Romulan Prison"	0:44
3.	"Leg Day"	2:17
4.	"Strange Energies"	1:08
5.	"The Time of His Life"	0:39
6.	"Riker's Plan"	3:15
7.	"Stay Alert, Stay Alive"	2:42
8.	"Mistress of the Winter Constellation"	3:38
9.	"The Black Mountain"	0:48
10.	"Mariner's Secret"	2:17
11.	"A Compromise!"	1:44
12.	"Delicate Dooplers"	1:39
13.	"Ejecting the Warp Core"	2:48
14.	"Stumbling on History"	0:42
15.	"City Escape"	2:15
16.	"Pakled Spy"	0:46
17.	"Making Tendi Laugh"	1:09
18.	"Lord Agimus"	1:01
19.	"Marooned"	2:23
20.	"Agimus Reigns"	3:55
21.	"Temporal Black Hole"	2:20
22.	"The Lower Decks"	0:39
23.	"I Am Available for Chess"	1:05
24.	"A New Officer"	2:14
25.	"Red Alarm"	2:49
26.	"Death Battle"	2:04
27.	"What Are Your Orders, Captain?"	1:38
28.	"Departing Space Doc"	0:30
29.	"Getting Desperate"	4:37
30.	"I Can See"	0:51
31.	"Into the Unknown"	2:42
32.	"Standing Down"	1:26
33.	"Don't Date Barnes"	1:14
34.	"Welcome to the Cerritos"	1:21
35.	"Humble Farmers"	3:30
36.	"Finding the Cure"	2:45
37.	"Swords and Spears"	3:01
38.	"Ransom vs. Vindor"	1:21
39.	"Saving Lives"	2:44
40.	"Failed Ascension"	1:01
41.	"Division 14"	1:39
42.	"The Farm Cures All"	1:45
43.	"Saying Goodbye"	1:57
44.	"The Cleaner"	1:26
45.	"The Cerritos"	1:27
46.	"Today You Die!"	4:48
47.	"The Real Mariner"	1:58
48.	"Self Destruct Timer"	1:30
49.	"Pakled Attack"	1:19
50.	"Badgey Gets Loose"	2:37
51.	"Memory Loss"	1:35
52.	"End Titles"	0:53
53.	"Bonus Track: batlh vIpoQ!"	0:50
Total length:		102:00

== Release ==
Home media releases for Star Trek: Lower Decks
Season	Home media release dates		
Season	Region 1	Region 2	Region 4
1	May 18, 2021	November 29, 2021	December 8, 2021
2	July 12, 2022	July 12, 2022	June 7, 2023
3	April 25, 2023	July 31, 2023	TBA
4	April 16, 2024	June 24, 2024	TBA
5	March 25, 2025	March 24, 2025	TBA

=== Streaming and broadcast ===
Star Trek: Lower Decks premiered on August 6, 2020, on CBS All Access in the United States. Each episode is broadcast in Canada by Bell Media on the same day as the U.S. release, on the specialty channels CTV Sci-Fi Channel (English) and Z (French) before streaming on Crave. In September 2020, ViacomCBS announced that CBS All Access would be expanded and rebranded as Paramount+ in March 2021. After CBS All Access was rebranded Paramount+, the first season remained on the service and future seasons were confirmed to be released on it.

International distribution was not secured by the series' premiere after negotiations were impacted by the COVID-19 pandemic. In December 2020, Amazon Prime Video was revealed to have the streaming rights in several territories—including Europe, Australia, New Zealand, Japan, and India—with the first season released on the service on January 22, 2021. The series is distributed worldwide by Paramount Global Distribution Group. In February 2023, Paramount made a new deal with Prime Video for the series' international streaming rights. This allowed all existing seasons to be added to Paramount+ in some other countries in addition to remaining on Prime Video. In July 2023, Bell Media announced that the series would be leaving Crave over the following month, likely so it could move to Paramount+ in Canada. Lower Decks would continue to be broadcast on CTV Sci-Fi and be available on CTV.ca and the CTV app.

=== Theatrical ===
In August 2023, Paramount and CBS announced that four episodes of the series would be shown during free theatrical fan screenings on September 8, which is Star Trek Day. This was part of Star Trek: The Animated Celebration, a celebration of the 50th anniversary of Star Trek: The Animated Series, as well as wider Star Trek Day events. The screenings included "sneak peeks and surprises", and were held in U.S., Canada, and UK cities.

== Reception ==
=== Critical response ===
Critical response of Star Trek: Lower Decks
Season	Rotten Tomatoes	Metacritic
1	68% (47 reviews)	59 (17 reviews)
2	100% (12 reviews)	—N/a
3	100% (6 reviews)	—N/a
4	100% (18 reviews)	83 (6 reviews)
5	88% (8 reviews)	84 (4 reviews)

Star Trek: Lower Decks has a 92% approval rating on the review aggregator website Rotten Tomatoes, while Metacritic, which uses a weighted average, has assigned a score of 64 out of 100 based on reviews from 24 critics, indicating "generally favorable" reviews.

For the first season, Rotten Tomatoes reported 68% approval with an average rating of 7.20/10 based on 47 reviews. The website's critical consensus reads, "Fun, but not very bold, Lower Decks flips the script on Star Trek regulation just enough to stand out in the franchise, if not the greater animation landscape." Metacritic assigned a score of 59 out of 100 based on reviews from 17 critics, indicating "mixed or average reviews".

Rotten Tomatoes reported 100% approval for the second season with an average rating of 8.30/10 based on 12 reviews. The website's critical consensus reads, "Lower Decks rights the ship with a more self-assured sophomore season that strikes an ideal balance between affection and irreverence." It also reported 100% approval for the third season with an average rating of 8.00/10 based on 6 reviews.

For the fourth season, Rotten Tomatoes reported 100% approval with an average rating of 8.80/10 based on 18 reviews. The website's critical consensus reads, "Mirthful as ever while having grown into a proper Star Trek serial in its own right, Lower Decks' fourth season swabs the series' formula into a pristine polish." Metacritic assigned a score of 83 out of 100 based on reviews from 6 critics, indicating "universal acclaim". Rotten Tomatoes reported 88% approval with an average rating of 8.30/10 based on 8 reviews for the fifth season. Metacritic assigned a score of 84 out of 100 based on reviews from 4 critics, again indicating "universal acclaim".

=== Accolades ===
Accolades received by Star Trek: Lower Decks
Year	Award	Category	Nominee(s)	Result	Ref.
2021	Annie Awards	Outstanding Achievement for Music in an Animated Television/Media Production	Chris Westlake (for "Crisis Point")	Nominated	
2021	Critics' Choice Super Awards	Best Animated Series	Star Trek: Lower Decks	Nominated	
2021	Critics' Choice Super Awards	Best Voice Actor in an Animated Series	Jack Quaid	Nominated	
2021	Critics' Choice Super Awards	Best Voice Actress in an Animated Series	Tawny Newsome	Nominated	
2021	NAACP Image Awards	Outstanding Animated Series	Star Trek: Lower Decks	Nominated	
2021	NAACP Image Awards	Outstanding Character Voice-Over Performance (Television)	Dawnn Lewis	Nominated	
2021	Primetime Creative Arts Emmy Awards	Outstanding Sound Editing for a Comedy or Drama Series (Half-Hour)	James Lucero, James Singleton, Jeff Halbert, Michael Britt, and Amber Funk (for "No Small Parts")	Nominated	
2021	Women's Image Network Awards	Outstanding Actress Animated Program	Dawnn Lewis	Won	
2021	Women's Image Network Awards	Outstanding Actress Animated Program	Tawny Newsome	Nominated	
2022	Golden Reel Awards	Outstanding Achievement in Sound Editing – Animation Series or Short	James Lucero, James Singleton, Mak Kellerman, Michael LaFerla, and Michael Britt (for "Strange Energies")	Nominated	
2022	Hollywood Critics Association TV Awards	Best Streaming Animated Series or TV Movie	Star Trek: Lower Decks	Nominated	
2022	Hugo Awards	Best Dramatic Presentation, Short Form	Bob Suarez and Kathryn Lyn (for "wej Duj")	Nominated	
2022	Saturn Awards	Best Animated Series	Star Trek: Lower Decks	Nominated	
2023	Annie Awards	Best Editorial – TV/Media	Andy Maxwell, Zach Lamplugh, Brandon Brocker, and Paul Mazzotta (for "The Stars At Night")	Nominated	
2023	Critics' Choice Television Awards	Best Animated Series	Star Trek: Lower Decks	Nominated	
2023	Astra Creative Arts TV Awards	Best Streaming Animated Series or TV Movie	Star Trek: Lower Decks	Nominated	
2024	Critics' Choice Television Awards	Best Animated Series	Star Trek: Lower Decks	Nominated	
2024	Golden Reel Awards	Outstanding Achievement in Sound Editing – Broadcast Animation	James Lucero, Mak Kellerman, John Wynn, and Michael Britt (for "Old Friends, New Planets")	Nominated	
2024	Primetime Creative Arts Emmy Awards	Outstanding Sound Editing for a Comedy or Drama Series (Half-Hour) and Animation	James Lucero, Drew Guy, Mak Kellerman, John Wynn, and Michael Britt (for "The Inner Fight")	Nominated	
2024	Saturn Awards	Best Animated Television Series or Special	Star Trek: Lower Decks	Nominated	
2024	Tell-Tale TV Awards	Favorite Animated Series	Star Trek: Lower Decks	Won	
2025	Annie Awards	Best Character Animation – TV/Media	Raymond Dunster	Nominated	
2025	Astra TV Awards	Best Animated Series	Star Trek: Lower Decks	Nominated	
2025	Astra TV Awards	Best Supporting Voice-Over Performance	Jack Quaid	Won	
2025	Dorian TV Awards	Best Animated Show	Star Trek: Lower Decks	Nominated	
2025	Hugo Awards	Best Dramatic Presentation, Short Form	Brandon Williams and Lauren McGuire (for "Fissure Quest")	Nominated	
2025	Hugo Awards	Best Dramatic Presentation, Short Form	Megan Lloyd and Mike McMahan (for "The New Next Generation")	Won	
2025	Nebula Awards	Ray Bradbury Award for Outstanding Dramatic Presentation	Star Trek: Lower Decks	Nominated	
2025	Primetime Creative Arts Emmy Awards	Outstanding Sound Editing for an Animated Program	James Lucero, Drew Guy, Konrad Piñon, James Singleton, John Wynn, Amber Funk, and Michael Britt (for "The New Next Generation")	Nominated	
2025	Saturn Awards	Best Animated Television Series	Star Trek: Lower Decks	Nominated	

== Tie-in media ==
=== Aftershow ===
A special episode of the official Star Trek aftershow The Ready Room, hosted by Star Trek: The Next Generation actor Wil Wheaton, was released following the premiere of Lower Decks. Wheaton returned for further aftershow episodes, which were released following key episodes of the series.

=== Video games ===
A free-to-play mobile game based on the series was revealed in February 2022, announced as Star Trek: Lower Decks The Badgey Directive or Star Trek: Lower Decks TBD. Developed by East Side Games and Mighty Kingdom for iOS and Android, it was set to feature the series' rogue artificial intelligence Badgey. It was released later in 2022 with the title Star Trek Lower Decks Mobile. In April, the mobile strategy game Star Trek Fleet Command launched a Lower Decks-themed expansion, adding the Cerritos, Mariner, Boimler, Badgey, and a new function called "Below Decks Abilities" that allows players to select a support crew who give them additional abilities.

=== Publishing ===
The series' first comic book tie-in, a three-issue miniseries titled Star Trek: Lower Decks, was written by Ryan North with art by Chris Fenoglio and released by IDW Publishing in September 2022. North also wrote a one-shot focused on Shaxs, titled Star Trek: Day of Blood – Shaxs' Best Day, that was released in September 2023 as part of IDW's Day of Blood crossover event. Derek Charm provided the art for the one-shot, which was pitched to North as "Shaxs [gets] to live his absolute best day and go completely ham on a bunch of fascist Klingons". Shaxs' Best Day was nominated for Best Single Issue/One-Shot at the 2024 Eisner Awards and Best Single Issue or Story at the 2024 Ringo Awards. In October 2023, Titan Books released the Star Trek: Lower Decks – Crew Handbook, an in-universe guide to the Cerritos written by Chris Farnell.

North and Fenoglio returned for a 182-page choose your own adventure-style graphic novel titled Star Trek: Lower Decks – Warp Your Own Way that IDW released in October 2024. Warp Your Own Way won Best Graphic Story or Comic at the 2025 Hugo Awards and Best Graphic Novel/Comic at the 2025 Aurora Awards. Starting in November 2024, IDW began publishing a new Star Trek: Lower Decks comic, the first ongoing comic book tie-in for the series. Again written by North, the comic has episodic storytelling with art by a rotating group of artists, including Charm (for the first issue) and Jack Lawrence. North and Charm re-teamed for another one-shot focused on Shaxs, titled Star Trek: Lore War – Shaxs' Worst Day, that was released in May 2025 as part of IDW's Lore War crossover event.

=== Crossover ===
At San Diego Comic-Con in July 2022, Kurtzman announced that an episode of Star Trek: Strange New Worlds's second season would be a crossover with Lower Decks, featuring a mixture of live-action and animation. Newsome and Quaid portrayed their Lower Decks characters in live-action as well as animation, with Wells, Cordero, and O'Connell reprising their voice roles. The episode, "Those Old Scientists", was released in July 2023.
