= Blovel =

Blovel (a portmanteau of blog and novel) is a novel created from serialized blog posts. This differs from a blook, which is a published book that has been made from, or inspired by, blog content.

With a blovel, the story is created in and for the blog. It may later become a blook, should the author or a publisher choose to combine the posts into a single publication, but it is primarily a work of fiction created using the technology of an internet blog.

Various writers contemplating blovels have laid out some criteria for blovels:

- Posts should be 250-500 words in length.
- Posts should end in cliffhangers or at least with suspenseful elements that keep the reader wanting to read the next days’ post.
- Post should be posted regularly, typically every 1–3 days.
- Readers should be allowed to comment on the posts.
- Authors should create the novel online through the daily posts and not simply cut and paste already written novels into blog posts.
- Blovels should be shorter works, typically 40,000-60,000 words in length.
- Blovels should follow the same pattern as novels with a beginning, climactic conflict, and dénouement or resolution.
- A blovel should run for no more than one year.

== History ==
The term “blovel” was coined in January 2006 in relation to the blog “Wonkette” by political blogger, Ana Marie Cox, who wrote a novel based on Wonkette called “Dog Days.” Janet Maslin, writing for the New York Times Book review (January 3, 2006), wrote: “And ‘Dog Days’ is predicated on the thought that it is a short leap from a blog to blovel.”

== Recent developments ==
The online cultural dictionary, “Urban Dictionary” defines a blovel as a novel based on the contents of a blog, but doesn’t define whether that novel resides on a blog or is a blook formed from a blog.

In 2012, Writers Digest published an article by Nina Amir, “Blog Your Way to a Book Deal,” in which she discussed writing a non-fiction book post by post in a blog and thus building an audience gradually along the way. The idea being that when the book was complete, it could come off the blog and be made into a blook. She suggested the same thing could be done with fiction but never used the word blovel to describe it.

Today, blovels are becoming more popular possibly due in part to the difficulty new authors have in building a readership that might attract an agent or traditional publisher for a book. In addition, some writers find the activity as entertaining for themselves as for their readers in that they are not entirely sure how the story will progress or how reader input will change the course of the story.
