= Arlene Barlin Award for Science Fiction and Fantasy =

Defunct Canadian literary award (2022-2025)

The Arlene Barlin Award for Science Fiction and Fantasy (2022–2025) was an annual literary award, administered by the Canadian Children's Book Centre, to recognize works of speculative fiction for children written by Canadian authors. Winners received a CA$5,000.

== Honorees ==
Award winners and finalists
Year	Author	Title	Result	Ref.
2022	Xiran Jay Zhao	Iron Widow	Winner	
2022	Liselle Sambury	Blood Like Magic	Finalist	
2022	Cherie Dimaline	Hunting by Stars	Finalist	
2022	Sarena Nanua and Sasha Nanua	Sisters of the Snake	Finalist	
2022	Lee Edward Födi	Spell Sweeper	Finalist	
2023	Deborah Falaye	Blood Scion	Winner	
2023	Kenneth Oppel	Ghostlight	Finalist	
2023	Christina Kilbourne	The Limitless Sky	Finalist	
2023	Judy I. Lin	A Magic Steeped in Poison	Finalist	
2023	Catherine Egan	Sneaks	Finalist	
2024	Nicki Pau Preto	Bonesmith	Winner	
2024	Heather Smith	The Boy, the Cloud and the Very Tall Tale	Finalist	
2024	Rebecca Schaeffer	City of Nightmares	Finalist	
2024	Coco Ma	Nightbreaker	Finalist	
2024	S. M. Beiko	The Stars of Mount Quixx	Finalist	
2025	Mark Morton	The Headmasters	Winner	
2025	S.K. Ali	Fledgling: The Keeper’s Records of Revolution	Finalist	
2025	Matteo L. Cerilli	Lockjaw	Finalist	
2025	Casey Lyall	Waking the Dead and Other Fun Activities	Finalist	
2025	A. B. Poranek	Where the Dark Stands Still	Finalist	
