= Star Trek: Lower Decks – Warp Your Own Way =

2024 Star Trek graphic novel and gamebook

- Author: Ryan North
- Illustrator: Chris Fenoglio
- Language: English
- Genre: Graphic novel; Gamebook
- Publisher: IDW Publishing
- Publication date: 2024

Star Trek: Lower Decks—Warp Your Own Way is a 2024 graphic novel/gamebook, set in the world of Star Trek: Lower Decks. It was written by Ryan North, with art by Chris Fenoglio, and was first published by IDW Publishing.

== Synopsis ==
Beckett Mariner wakes up on the starship Cerritos and must decide what kind of coffee to have for breakfast. The choices the reader makes on her behalf all lead to other choices and produce a variety of scenarios; but in every storyline some type of crisis develops, some character demands Mariner reveal the starship's "prefix code" (information she does not have), and Mariner is eventually killed. A hint in one of the storylines allows the reader to figure out how to choose for Mariner to order tea instead of coffee; this launches a new storyline in which, in collaboration with the reader, Mariner eventually discovers that a villain is attempting to learn the prefix code in order to remotely commandeer the Cerritos, and is repeatedly creating clones of Mariner, putting them in simulated dangerous situations in order to try to extract the code from her, and killing them when she fails. Mariner and the reader must collaborate to outwit the villain, as Mariner discovers different components of the solution in different storylines (simulations) that the reader must synthesize.

== Reception ==
Star Trek: Lower Decks—Warp Your Own Way won the 2025 Hugo Award for Best Graphic Story and the 2025 Aurora Award for Best Graphic Novel.

At Strange Horizons, Abigail Nussbaum found it to be "clever [and] delightful", emphasizing that it is both "an excellent Lower Decks story" and "an inventive, surprising use of the Choose Your Own Adventure format". Nussbaum praised North for "captur[ing] the feel of [Lower Decks]' comedy perfectly", for his use of the comics medium, and for "knowing when to take the reader's choice away (...) for the sake of a satisfying experience."
