= S. M. Beiko =

Canadian artist, author, and editor

Samantha Mary Beiko (born c. 1990) is a Canadian artist, author, and editor based in Winnipeg. She has won four Aurora Awards for her artistry and works, and has been nominated for multiple other awards. As of 2026, Beiko has authored seven books, edited or co-edited three collections, and is the artist-writer for a webcomic.

== Career ==
Beiko's first novel, The Lake and the Library (2013), published with ECW Press, was a finalist for the 2014 Aurora Award for Best YA Novel.

Following The Lake and the Library, Beiko began her Realms of the Ancient trilogy, including Scion of the Fox (2017), Children of the Bloodlands (2018), and The Brilliant Dark (2019). Scion of the Fox won the Copper Cylinder Award for Young Adult (2018) and was longlisted for the Sunburst Award for Young Adult Fiction (2018). All three novels were finalists for the Aurora Award for Best YA Novel, in 2018, 2019, and 2020, respectively.

Beiko began published the Brindlewatch Quintet in 2023, with the following books published as of 2026: The Stars of Mount Quixx (2023), The Door in Lake Mallion (2024), and The Sleuth of Ferren City (2026). In 2024, The Stars of Mount Quixx was a finalist for the Aurora Award for Best YA Novel, as well as the Canadian Children's Book Centre's Arlene Barlin Award for Science Fiction and Fantasy. The following year, The Door in Lake Mallion was a finalist for the Aurora Award for Best YA Novel.

In addition to her novels, Beiko is the sole writer and artist of the Krampus Is My Boyfriend! webcomic. The webcomic won the 2020 Aurora Award for Best Graphic Novel, and was a finalist for the award in 2019 and 2021. It was also a finalist for the 2020 Joe Shuster Award for Best Webcomic.

Beiko's edited and co-edited collections include Imaginarium 2013 (2013) with Sandra Kasturi, Gothic Tales of Haunted Love (2018) with Hope Nicholson, and Gothic Tales of Haunted Futures (2020). Imaginarium 2013 was a finalist for the 2013 Aurora Award for Best Related Work, and Gothic Tales of the Haunted Futures was a finalist for the 2021 Aurora Award for Best Graphic Novel. In 2018, Kirkus Reviews included Gothic Tales of Haunted Love on their list of the best books of 2018. In 2021, Renegade Arts Entertainment was also nominated for the Alberta Book Publishing Awards for Book of the Year Award – Speculative Fiction and Graphic Novel of the Year Award for Gothic Tales of the Haunted Futures.

In addition to Beiko's work with speculative fiction, she hosted the Business BFFs podcast with fellow author Clare C. Marshall. In 2019, the podcast was a finalist for the Aurora Award for Best Related Work. She also co-hosts a local political podcast, Ballot Babes, with Patty Wiens.

She also co-founded the Prairie Comics Festival, and has been a vocal advocate for increasing safe cycling routes in Winnipeg.

== Awards and honours ==
In 2016, Beiko and Chadwick Ginther were finalists for the Aurora Award for Best Fan Organizational as chairs of the Chiaroscuro Reading Series in Winnipeg. From 2017 to 2021, Beiko was nominated for the Aurora Award for Best Artist every year, winning the award in 2017, 2019, and 2021.

Awards for Beiko's work
Year	Work	Award	Result	Ref.
2013	Imaginarium 2013	Aurora Award for Best Related Work	Finalist	
2014	The Lake and the Library	Aurora Award for Best YA Novel	Finalist	
2018	Scion of the Fox	Aurora Award for Best YA Novel	Finalist	
2018	Scion of the Fox	Copper Cylinder Award for Young Adult	Winner	
2018	Scion of the Fox	Sunburst Award for Young Adult Fiction	Longlist	
2019	Business BFFs	Aurora Award for Best Related Work	Finalist	
2019	Children of the Bloodlands	Aurora Award for Best YA Novel	Finalist	
2019	Krampus Is My Boyfriend!	Aurora Award for Best Graphic Novel	Finalist	
2020	The Brilliant Dark	Aurora Award for Best YA Novel	Finalist	
2020	Krampus Is My Boyfriend!	Aurora Award for Best Graphic Novel	Winner	
2020	Krampus Is My Boyfriend!	Joe Shuster Award for Best Webcomic	Finalist	
2021	Gothic Tales of Haunted Futures	Alberta Book Publishing Award for Graphic Novel of the Year Award	Finalist	
2021	Gothic Tales of Haunted Futures	Alberta Book Publishing Award for Speculative Fiction Book of the Year Award	Finalist	
2021	Gothic Tales of Haunted Futures	Aurora Award for Best Graphic Novel	Finalist	
2021	Krampus Is My Boyfriend!	Aurora Award for Best Graphic Novel	Finalist	
2024	The Stars of Mount Quixx	Aurora Award for Best YA Novel	Finalist	
2024	The Stars of Mount Quixx	Arlene Barlin Award for Science Fiction and Fantasy	Shortlist	
2025	The Door in Lake Mallion	Aurora Award for Best YA Novel	Finalist	

== Books ==
=== As author ===
==== Standalone novels ====
- Beiko, S. M. (2013). The Lake and the Library. ECW Press. ISBN 978-1-770-41057-2.

==== The Realms of the Ancient ====
1. Beiko, S. M. (2017). Scion of the Fox. ECW Press. ISBN 978-1-77041-357-3.
2. Beiko, S. M. (2018). Children of the Bloodlands. ECW Press. ISBN 978-1-77041-358-0.
3. Beiko, S. M. (2019). The Brilliant Dark. ECW Press. ISBN 978-1-77041-359-7.

==== Brindlewatch Quintet ====
1. Beiko, S. M. (2023). The Stars of Mount Quixx. ECW Press. ISBN 978-1-770-41695-6.
2. Beiko, S. M. (2024). The Door in Lake Mallion. ECW Press. ISBN 978-1-770-41696-3.
3. Beiko, S. M. (2026). The Sleuth of Ferren City. ECW Press. ISBN 978-1-770-41697-0.

=== As editor ===
- Beiko, Samantha; Kasturi, Sandra (2013). Imaginarium 2013: The Best Canadian Speculative Writing. ChiZine. ISBN 978-1-771-48149-6. OCLC 828891213.
- Nicholson, Hope; Beiko, S. M., eds. (2018). Gothic Tales of Haunted Love. Bedside Press. ISBN 978-1-988-71512-4.
- Beiko, S. M., ed. (2020). Gothic Tales of Haunted Futures. Renegade Arts. ISBN 978-1-989-75403-0.
