= Wondermark =

Webcomic by David Malki

- Author: David Malki
- Website: wondermark.com
- Launch date: May 2003
- Genre: Humor

Wondermark is a webcomic created by David Malki which was syndicated to Flak Magazine and appeared in The Onion's print edition from 2006 to 2008. It features 19th-century illustrations that have been recontextualized to create humorous juxtapositions. It takes the horizontal four-panel shape of a newspaper strip, although the number of panels varies from one to six or more. It is updated intermittently.

A typical Wondermark episode consists of one or more Victorian-era drawings of people and/or objects, repeated for several panels, with dialogue added to create a joke. In some cases, the images vary from panel to panel, creating a narrative. Occasionally, the joke in the last panel takes the form of a purely visual gag. An additional moralism can be found in the comic's image alt attribute.

The creator, David Malki, has stated that the images are obtained from public domain primary sources such as 19th century-era periodicals. Malki obtains these images from public libraries and from his own collection of rare books.

== Story ==
There is no narrative continuity in Wondermark; each episode is generally unrelated to the previous or next, although on rare occasions a scenario will repeat for a second episode. In some episodes, situations and dialogue indicate that the setting may be the 19th century; in others, the characters allude to recent events or use contemporary technology (such as computers), often adapted to the period setting using steampunk-influenced designs. Although certain images are used multiple times in different episodes, Malki has stated that each episode is meant to be read independent of any continuity.

The subject matter of the comics is diverse. Wondermark's targets have included politics, business, censorship, fashion, self-pity, and paranoia.

== The Wondermark website ==
Besides the comics, the Wondermark website includes a number of features and articles.

=== True Stuff From Old Books ===
In this occasional blog series, Malki reposts and annotates interesting period articles and images he's discovered in old books, magazines, and newspapers while looking for source images for Wondermark.

=== 2 Minutes to Wondermark ===
Malki provides commentary on the making of individual Wondermark episodes over accelerated 2-minute long time-lapse screen recordings of that strip being created.

=== Malki on the Mark ===
A podcast in which Malki describes the process of designing and printing a Wondermark book collection. This series is available to Malki's Patreon subscribers.

=== The Making of Wondermark ===
The Making of Wondermark is a facetious behind-the-scenes look at the creation of the comic strip. It satirizes the committee-rules process that creates many newspaper comic strips as well as other elements of popular culture (such as movie trailers, which Malki used to edit as his full-time job). It also presents a humorously exaggerated view of the time, effort, and number of personnel necessary to produce the comic strip.

=== Ask Gax ===
In this blog series, the Wondermark character Gax, an alien being who hates humans, answers advice questions sent in by actual Wondermark readers.

=== Roll-a-Sketch ===
At comic conventions, Malki creates sketches at his table using a dice-based random phrase generator. Photos of some of the sketches are posted on the Wondermark blog after each show.

=== Me vs. Comic-Con: Who's Better? ===
In July 2007, Malki brought a video camera to San Diego Comic-Con and asked his fellow comics creators, "Who's better, me or Comic-Con?" The result was a 16-minute documentary film that explores the question in depth.

== Books ==
=== Comics ===
The first Wondermark strip collection, entitled The Annotated Wondermark, was first printed in December 2004. It contains Wondermark episodes 1–100 and also includes many pages of ancillary material, such as rejected concept pieces and reader-participation features. The book has since been revised twice. The second edition added an introduction by Dave Sim, while the third edition featured remastered artwork and an introduction by Ryan North.

In 2008, 2009, and 2010, three Wondermark hardcover collections were published by Dark Horse Comics: Beards of Our Forefathers, Clever Tricks to Stave Off Death, and Dapper Caps & Pedal-Copters. Each book contained around 100 comic strips, plus several pages of new material written just for the book, as well as reprints of graphic-novel-style Wondermark stories that did not appear on the Wondermark site.

In September 2012, TopatoCo published the hardcover collection Emperor of the Food Chain, featuring the joyously mythical creature the piranhamoose.

Malki has also collected the animal-themed comic strips into a small "Pocketbook" volume entitled Classy Lady Like You Will Love the Smell of My Butt.

=== Prose ===
There is also a trilogy of prose books entitled Dispatches from Wondermark Manor (513 pages in total). They were released over three years between 2007 and 2009. The books collect chapters of short fiction originally published by Malki in his twice-weekly Wondermark email newsletter, from which an overall story arc eventually emerges. The trilogy is written in an archaic, verbose style, and is a parody of Victorian novels.

In 2010, the trilogy was re-released in a combined edition entitled The Compleat Dispatches from Wondermark Manor.

In 2014, Malki published a "Pocketbook" of short, Edward Gorey-inspired bits of morbid verse called Horrid Little Stories: Sixty Dark and Tiny Tales of Misery and Woe.

== David Malki ==
According to the Wondermark website, Malki (who styles his name as "David Malki !") lives in Los Angeles doing design work, and previously worked as a movie trailer editor.

== Other Wondermark venues ==
David Malki has also contributed to Whispered Apologies and created guest episodes for comics including Dinosaur Comics, Scenes from a Multiverse, Reprographics, Goats, Alien Loves Predator, Unshelved, and Sheldon. Wondermark is part of the Playground Ghosts collective whose other members include Reprographics, Acid Keg, Fluff in Brooklyn, Alien Loves Predator, and Pixel.

Wondermark was also featured in the Blank Label Comics Hurricane Relief Telethon website and book, and exclusive episodes were created for each episode of the now-defunct Zoinks! The Webcomics Newspaper. Over the years, individual strips have run in college papers, alternative newsweeklies, and been licensed for textbooks, book covers, and art books.

From July 2006 to the end of 2008, Wondermark ran in the printed newspaper edition of The Onion, and then from October 2010 to December 2013 it ran online on The A.V. Club.

From August 2006 to October 2008, each episode of Wondermark also appeared on the webcomics site Modern Tales.

In 2008, 2009, and 2010, Malki created 8-page Wondermark stories (entitled "Ransom!", "The Catch!", and "The Gax of Life") for the anthology series Myspace Dark Horse Presents. Each story also later appeared in a Wondermark book collection.

Malki also directed and edited a short film entitled Expendable, which was released as part of the Now Film Festival in January 2008 under the production title "Wondermark Enterprises". The film was produced by Todd Croak-Falen. It went on to play in over 30 film festivals and won two awards: "Best Narrative Short" at the 2008 Tallahassee Film Festival and "Best Comedy Short" at the 2008 Illinois International Film Festival.

In 2011, Malki hand-collaged a Wondermark-style wooden box as part of an "Artist Box" promotion for Hendrick's Gin.

In 2012 and 2013, Malki led workshops at MaxFunCon called "Victorian Portraiture the Easy Way", in which conference attendees used scissors and glue to make Wondermark-style portraits of themselves.

In 2013, Malki created a series of Wondermark-style animations, entitled "Real True Actual Stories of America", as a promotion for Audible.co.uk's release of Bill Bryson's book One Summer: America 1927.

== Legacy ==
=== Sea lioning ===
In September 2014, the word "sea lioning" (also rendered "sea-lioning" or "sealioning") was coined based on a Wondermark strip titled The Terrible Sea Lion (No. 1062), which refers to a type of Internet trolling, and which consists of bad-faith requests for evidence, or repeated questions, in an attempt to derail a discussion or to wear down the patience of one's opponent. In the comic strip, a character expresses a dislike of sea lions, and a sea lion immediately appears, following the character around to repeatedly ask why that is.

=== Awards ===
- Wondermark was nominated for Web Cartoonists' Choice Awards in 2006 and 2007 for "Outstanding Short Form Comic" and "Outstanding Comedic Comic," respectively.
- In 2007, it was nominated for an Ignatz Award for "Outstanding Online Comic."
- In 2007, the Wondermark short story "Treachery!" was nominated for the Stumptown Comics Fest's Stumptown Trophy for "Outstanding Writing."
- In 2009, Wondermark was nominated for two Harvey Awards, in the categories "Special Award for Humor in Comics" and "Special Award for Excellence in Presentation", for the Wondermark collection Beards of our Forefathers.
- In 2009, the Wondermark collection Beards of our Forefathers was nominated for an Eisner Award for "Best Humor Publication."
- In 2011, the Wondermark collection Dapper Caps & Pedal-Copters won the PubWest Gold Award, in the category "Graphic Album - New Material", for excellence in book design.
- In 2011, Wondermark won the Stumptown Comics Fest's Stumptown Trophy for "Outstanding Online Comic."
- In 2019, the Wondermark collection Friends You Can Ride On was nominated for an Eisner Award for "Best Humor Publication."
