= Ryan Sohmer =

Canadian writer and businessman (born 1978)

- Born: July 5, 1978 (age 48) Montreal, Quebec, Canada
- Notable works: Least I Could Do; Looking For Group; The Gutters

Ryan Sohmer (born July 5, 1978) is a Canadian writer and businessman. Sohmer writes the webcomics Least I Could Do and Looking for Group. Sohmer is the Vice President/Creative Director of Blind Ferret Entertainment and was the owner of The 4th Wall, a comic book store in Montreal, Quebec until it closed on September 30, 2014. He lives in Montreal, Quebec.

== Career ==
Least I Could Do (LICD) is a comedic slice-of-life webcomic that began on February 10, 2003. It was initially published in black and white and updated five days a week, but has now moved on to being a full-colour strip published seven days a week with the inclusion of the Sunday strip, Least I Could Do Beginnings which debuted on November 9, 2008.

Looking for Group (LFG) is a comedic fantasy webcomic that began on November 6, 2006, and is drawn by his artistic partner, Lar DeSouza. It is published in full-color comic book page format and updates twice a week; Mondays and Thursdays.

Launched in June 2010, ended in December 2014, Gutters parodied the comic industry and its characters. The comic took the form of standalone pages, written by Sohmer but illustrated by different artists. The comic updated on Mondays, Wednesdays and Fridays.

== Awards ==
Sohmer has been nominated for two Harvey Awards in 2009 for Humor in Comics and Best On-Line Comics Work, as well as the Joe Shuster Award for Webcomics in 2009 and was the co-winner of the 2008 Shuster Award for Webcomics Creator/Creative Team along with his artistic partner, Lar DeSouza. Sohmer and DeSouza, along with colorist Ed Ryzowski, were also nominated for a total of six 2011 Harvey Awards for The Gutters.
