= Dinosaur Comics =

Webcomic by Ryan North

- Author: Ryan North
- Website: www.qwantz.com
- Current status/schedule: Updated every Monday, Wednesday, and Friday except Canadian holidays
- Launch date: February 1, 2003
- Genre: Humour

Dinosaur Comics is a constrained webcomic by Canadian writer Ryan North. It is also known as "Qwantz", after the site's domain name, "qwantz.com". The first comic was posted on February 1, 2003, although there were earlier prototypes. Dinosaur Comics has also been printed in three collections and in a number of newspapers. The comic centers on three main characters, T-Rex, Utahraptor and Dromiceiomimus.

Comics are posted every Monday, Wednesday, and Friday. Every strip uses the same artwork and panel layout; only the dialogue changes from day to day. There are occasional deviations from this principle, including a number of episodic comics. North created the comic because it was something he'd "long wanted to do but couldn’t figure out how to accomplish... [he doesn't] draw, so working in a visual medium like comics isn’t the easiest thing to stumble into."

== Cast ==
- T-Rex, the main character that appears in all six panels.
- Utahraptor, T-Rex's comic foil, appears in the fourth and fifth panels of the comic.
- Dromiceiomimus appears in the third panel. She is generally friendly to T-Rex, answering either neutrally or with mild, friendly criticism.
- The tiny woman in panel four and the house in panel three have contributed dialogue but are usually silent.
- Other unseen characters occasionally contribute dialogue. For example, "God" speaks from off panel in bold all-caps, "Satan" speaks from off panel in dark red all-caps, and T-Rex's sinister neighbours (raccoons and cephalopods) speak in italicized all-caps from off panel.

== Creation ==
Ryan North started Dinosaur Comics during his last year of his undergraduate degree. In a 2016 interview, he said he "wanted to do something with comics [but] I couldn't draw — still can't draw. I didn't realize that there was such a thing as writers in comics. I thought it was all one person." At about the same time as he came up with the concept of a fixed-art comic, North received a school assignment to, as he described it, "do something interesting with the Internet." He was assigned a group, and his group was given the URL qwantz.com. After some time, his group had done nothing and North decided to upload some comics to the site. The first Dinosaur Comics strip was posted on February 1, 2003 and was called "Today is a beautiful day."

All the comics are six-panel strips, using clip art that North found on a CD he had purchased. Every strip uses the same art, with occasional exceptions, such as the mirror universe comics which uses the art but reversed.

== Reception ==
Dinosaur Comics has received several awards and recognitions. It was named one of the best webcomics of 2004 and 2005 by The Webcomics Examiner. Wired listed Dinosaur Comics as one of "Five Webcomics You Can Share With Your Kids" and PC Magazine included the comic in its "10 Wicked Awesome Webcomics" list. Cracked.com named Dinosaur Comics one of the 8 funniest webcomics on the internet.

In 2005, it won "Outstanding Anthropomorphic Comic" in the Web Cartoonists' Choice Awards. Soon after, in August 2005, Dinosaur Comics was accepted into the Dayfree Press. In 2006, the blook Dinosaur Comics: Huge Eyes, Beaks, Intelligence, and Ambition was a runner up for the Lulu Blooker Prize for comics.

== Collected editions ==
- The Best of Dinosaur Comics: 2003–2005 AD: Your Whole Family Is Made of Meat (April 15, 2006, Quack!Media) ISBN 0-7560-0518-3
- Dinosaur Comics fig. d: Dudes Already Know About Chickens (2010, TopatoCo) ISBN 978-0-9824862-6-9
- Dinosaur Comics fig. e: Everybody knows failure is just success rounded down (2011, TopatoCo) ISBN 978-1-936561-90-2
- Dinosaur Comics fig. f: Feelings are boring, kissing is awesome (2012, TopatoCo) ISBN 978-1-936561-86-5

== See also ==
- Attitude 3: The New Subversive Online Cartoonists (includes material from Dinosaur Comics)
