= Janet Hetherington =

Canadian writer

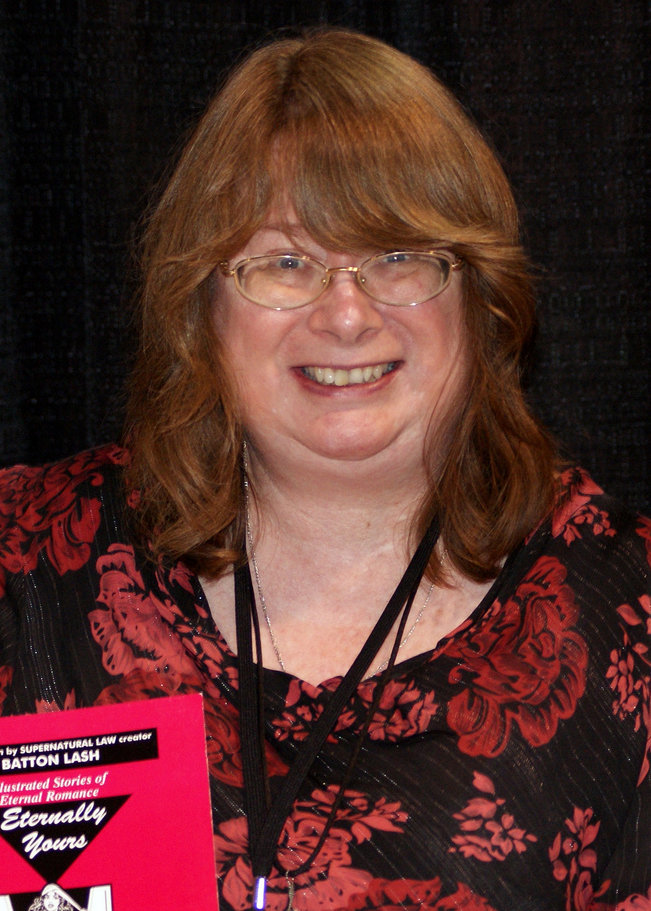
Hetherington in June 2011

Janet L. Hetherington (born November 19, 1955, in Toronto, Ontario) is a Canadian writer and artist. She was a winner of a Prix Aurora Award for Canadian science fiction excellence in 1999 for her work in co-curating a "60 Years of Superman" exhibit.

She has been creating comic books with partner Ronn Sutton at Hetherington / Sutton Studios in Ottawa, since the early 1990s. Hetherington and Sutton have collaborated and worked independently and on various projects, including designing promotional material for Canada Post's popular "Superhero Stamp" series of 1995. This stamp series featured Canadian origin comic book characters Superman, Nelvana of the Northern Lights, Johnny Canuck, Captain Canuck and Fleur de Lys.
