= Looking for Group =

Canadian fantasy webcomic

- Author(s): Ryan Sohmer, Ryan Costello, and Lar deSouza
- Illustrator: Lar deSousa
- Website: www.lfg.co
- Current status/schedule: Updated every Monday through Friday
- Launch date: November 26, 2006
- End date: August 31, 2023
- Genre(s): Fantasy, humor

Looking for Group (LFG) is a fantasy-themed Canadian webcomic written by Ryan Sohmer and Ryan Costello and drawn by Lar DeSouza.

The comic follows the adventures of Cale'Anon (an elven hunter) and Richard (an undead warlock), as well as their companions. Since its launch on November 26, 2006, it has received positive attention at Stratics and by the World of Warcraft community. LFG was cancelled in 2023, with the last strip going live on August 31, 2023.

== Overview ==
Looking for Group's Ryan Sohmer (the author of Least I Could Do) and Lar deSouza (the artist of Least I Could Do) draw the themes of Looking for Group from many influences, such as Terry Goodkind's Sword of Truth series, "Dungeons & Dragons", Robert Jordan's The Wheel of Time series, George R. R. Martin's A Song of Ice and Fire (with several acknowledged news posts of this), and Blizzard Entertainment's popular MMORPG video game World of Warcraft.

The art style and the title imply that it was originally intended as a parody of World of Warcraft - the four main characters resemble four of the Horde races in World of Warcraft. Though the comic began as purely humorous in tone, it soon shifted to a more serious (albeit complicated) adventure, with most of the remaining comedy carried by Richard the warlock. A recurring gag in the comic features characters resembling famous fantasy characters such as Frodo Baggins, Obi-Wan Kenobi and a Smurf appearing and then immediately being killed. Dialogue from The Lord of the Rings is often parodied, and pop culture references in medieval guise abound. The comic was updated twice a week, on Mondays and Thursdays.

== Spin-off comics ==
=== Non-Player Character ===
Non-Player Character, or NPC, debuting on January 3, 2014, is a spin-off series made of short stories focusing on the background of various supporting characters, some of which only appeared on one page in the main comic. Like the main story, it is written by Sohmer. The first six stories were drawn by Mohammad "Hawk" Haque, but since then each story is done by a unique artist. New pages are published each Tuesday and Friday. However, the comic went on break late in 2016 and has had no new updates since.

=== Tiny Dick Adventures ===
Tiny Dick Adventures debuted on 19 February 2014. It is written by Sohmer and drawn by Ryan Dunlavey. The non-canon comic is made of short humorous strips featuring a miniature version of Richard in a contemporary setting, often reacting on recent events or ongoing trends. New strips were released each Wednesday. Blind Ferret published 2 print volumes of the series. On 21 February 2019, Dunlavey announced that the comic was on an indefinite hiatus.

== Film & other Media ==
=== Movie & Preview Videos ===
On August 6, 2007, Ryan Sohmer posted a video link in his blogs on the homepage of Looking For Group. The video, entitled "Slaughter your World," features Richard, voiced by Dave B. Mitchell, singing a parodied version of the song "Part of Your World" from Disney's The Little Mermaid. It is revealed at the end and in the blog that the video is actually a teaser trailer for "a full 75–90-minute feature film." The film, currently under the working title of "Looking For Group: The Origins of Dick" with an original release date of 2008, but has since been moved to TBA status. On June 6, 2010, a super moderator of the forums confirmed that the movie is "still in the works" with no set release date as yet. Throughout late 2010, when many members of the LFG forum were expecting word on the film, there were rumors that the film was "in development hell". These rumors were never responded to.

The first teaser trailer shows Richard slaughtering an entire village. It was the most watched video on YouTube for many days after its initial release and has altogether been watched over seven million times. Within days, the video had become so popular that fans made numerous requests to be able to purchase the song. On August 19, it was announced on the LFG Forum that a mp3 download version of the Slaughter Your World would be available for a small fee.

A second teaser trailer called LFG: This is War was released in December 2008, and features Richard and Cale in battle while singing a parodied version of the song "A Whole New World" from Disney's Aladdin, which when paired with the previous "Slaughter your World" trailer suggests that Disney parodies might be a frequent occurrence in the movie. Cale tries to save some innocents and kills an attacking troll, while Richard kills the innocents and reveals that he started the war and would happily fight for either side.

On May 3, 2012, it was confirmed that the movie was still in the works, just slowed by government subsidies.

=== Merchandise ===
A limited-edition collectible figurine of Richard was released for sale on 15 November 2007. The figurine was limited to 500 pre-orders, and sold out within 24 hours. The webmaster described the event as "--an eventful full day filled of near server explosions".

=== Video Game ===
On March 2 of 2008, Sohmer announced that they might be coming out with a video game. On June 26, 2013, a video was released advertising a kickstarter for it. It is currently being called "Left for Group: The Fork of Truth".

=== Board Game ===
Released in 2016 and designed by Ryan Costello, Orphans & Ashes is a fast-paced two-player tile-laying game with push-your-luck and dexterity elements that plays in 45–60 minutes.

Players take on the role of one of two popular Looking for Group characters, Cale and Richard, as they stumble upon an orphanage that has caught fire and is burning down. The aim for Cale is to rescue orphans from the burning building while Richard aims to use one of his special abilities to harvest their souls before the fire gets them.

Every turn is divided into two phases: the action phase and the fire phase. During the action phase, players use a range of actions with which to explore the orphanage, put out fires and either rescue or incinerate the orphans found within. The fire phase is when the players spread the fire around the board. Placement of fire is governed by a set of "immutable rules".

Cale's player will use a partially dexterity-based mechanic to rescue the orphans by balancing and hooking the miniatures onto Cale's character model. Cale's arms are designed to hook onto the orphans' hands, allowing our elven hero to carry the orphans he saves with him.

Richard uses the red fire pawns that, like the yellow fire pawns going around the orphanage, clip to the base of the pawns they set on fire.

== Awards ==
1. On June 14, 2008, the comic was awarded the Joe Shuster Award for Outstanding Canadian Web Comics Creators for both Looking for Group and Least I Could Do. Lar DeSouza accepted the award on behalf of himself and Ryan Sohmer.
2. On August 9, 2009, the artist, Lar de Souza, was awarded the Prix Aurora Award for Artistic Achievement for Looking for Group.
