= Ronn Sutton =

Canadian illustrator and comic book artist (born 1952)

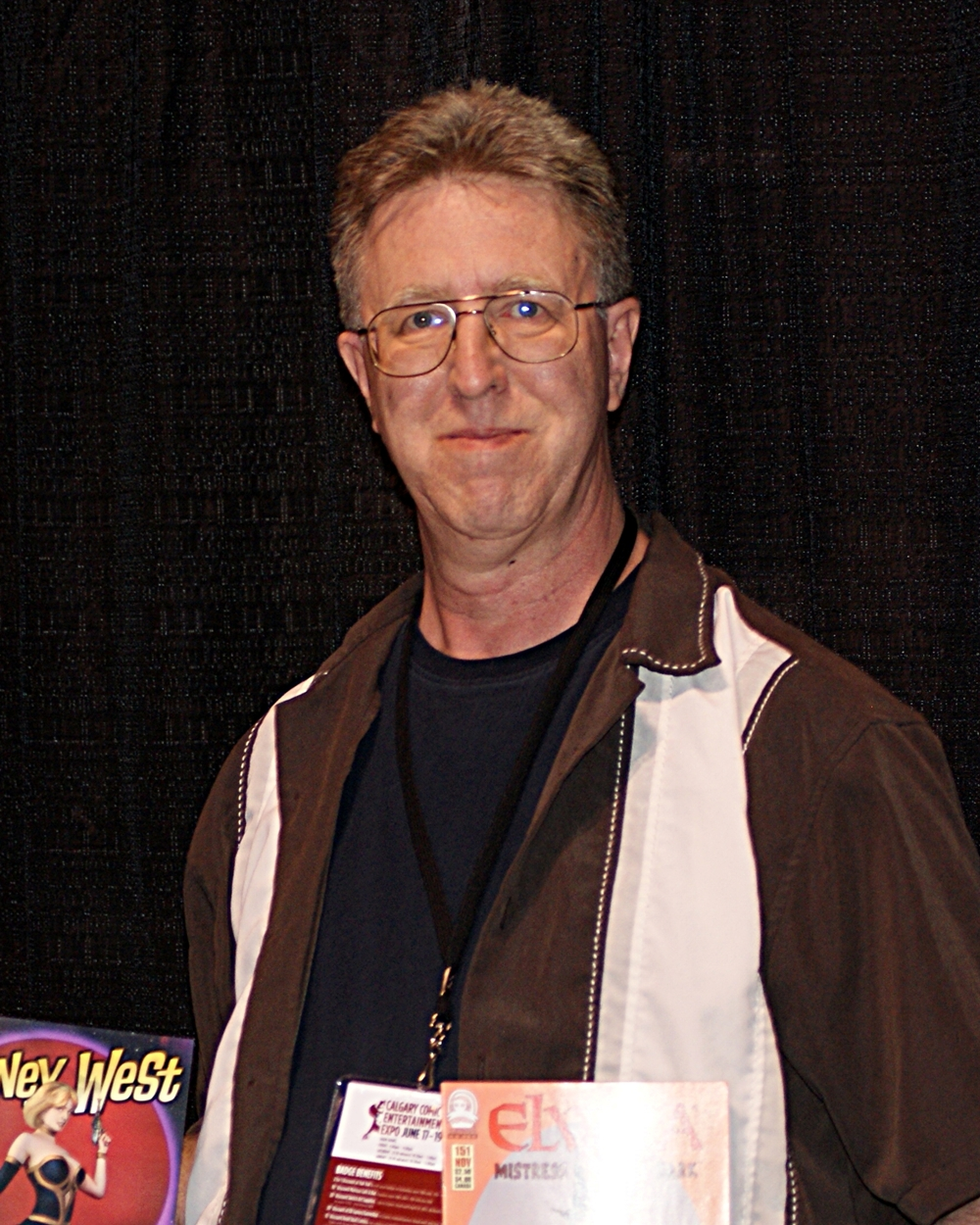
Ronn Sutton at the 2011 Calgary Comic & Entertainment Expo

Ronn Sutton (born December 17, 1952) is a Canadian illustrator and comic book artist.

He has drawn several hundred comic books over the past four decades, including a nine-year period illustrating nearly fifty issues of Elvira, Mistress of the Dark for Claypool Comics from 1998 to 2006.

== Career ==
Sutton's comics career began in 1973 with his artwork appearing in issues of the Canadian newsstand comic ORB Magazine, as well as anonymously penciling and inking many pages of Howard Chaykin's Sword of Sorcery for DC Comics (although he hid his initials drawn into a sword handle in issue #3, page 23). Over the decades, he has drawn for a variety of publishers that have included Vortex Comics, Renegade Press, Northstar, Brainstorm, Draculina, Caliber Comics, Millennium Publications, Claypool Comics, Dark Horse Comics, Moonstone Books and more. Sutton has drawn issues of The Man from U.N.C.L.E., Cases of Sherlock Holmes, Vampira, Draculina, Fear Agent, The Phantom, Honey West and many others.

In 2015, Motorbooks published the 96-page graphic novel Lucifers Sword M.C.: Life and Death in an Outlaw Motorcycle Club, scripted by Hells Angel Phil Cross and illustrated by Sutton. That same year saw publication of the true military comic Victims of War, written by Colonel Pat Stogran and illustrated by Sutton, about PTSD and other difficulties suffered by veterans who had served in Afghanistan.

Sutton has done extensive magazine and newspaper illustration for Maclean's, Canadian Business, Saturday Night, Owl, National Post, etc., as well as providing freelance courtroom sketches for seven years for television and newspapers.

He has worked periodically in animation (the television series The Savage Dragon and Rescue Heroes), provided over ninety on-screen drawings for the true-crime television series Natural Born Outlaws, and was nominated thirteen times between 1997 and 2009 for the Prix Aurora Award, the Canadian science-fiction award for artistic achievement.

Sutton has often collaborated with writer Janet Hetherington on a variety of published comics since the early 1990s.

Beginning March 10, 2018, Edgar Rice Burroughs Inc. launched an online weekly comic strip adaptation of the Burroughs 1915 novella The Man-Eater, written by Martin Powell, drawn by Sutton and coloured by Becka Kinzie as a regular ongoing feature.
