= Ryan North =

Canadian writer

- North at GalaxyCon San Jose in 2026
- Born: October 20, 1980 (age 46); Ottawa, Ontario, Canada
- Occupations: Comic writer, computer programmer
- Spouse: Jenn Klug
- Writing career
- Period: 2000–present
- Genre: Humour
- Notable works: Fantastic Four; Dinosaur Comics; Adventure Time (comic book); The Unbeatable Squirrel Girl; One World Under Doom
- Notable awards: Eisner Award (2013, 2017, 2024), Hugo Award (2025)
- Movement: Webcomics
- Website: www.ryannorth.ca

Ryan North (born October 20, 1980) is a Canadian webcomic and comic book writer and computer programmer.

He is the creator and author of Dinosaur Comics, and has written for the comic series of Adventure Time and Marvel Comics' The Unbeatable Squirrel Girl, Fantastic Four, One World Under Doom, and Hulk: Smash Everything. His works have won multiple Eisner Awards and Harvey Awards and made New York Times Bestseller lists.

== Comics ==
=== Webcomics ===
North started the webcomic Dinosaur Comics in 2003, during the last year of his undergraduate degree. Dinosaur Comics is a fixed-art webcomic which uses the same base art for every strip. As of 2025 North has produced more than 4,300 strips.

Dinosaur Comics was named one of the best webcomics of 2004 and 2005 by The Webcomics Examiner. Wired listed Dinosaur Comics as one of "Five Webcomics You Can Share With Your Kids" and PC Magazine included the comic in its "10 Wicked Awesome Webcomics" list. Cracked.com named Dinosaur Comics one of the 8 funniest webcomics on the internet. In 2005, it won "Outstanding Anthropomorphic Comic" in the Web Cartoonists' Choice Awards.

As well as Dinosaur Comics, North also created Whispered Apologies, a site where users could submit comic art without text and others would write text to match the art.

Canada's The Globe and Mail described North as a "pioneering webcomic creator".

=== Printed comics and graphic novels ===
North was the writer of the Adventure Time comic book series from 2012 to 2014. In 2013 the series won an Eisner Award (Best Publication for Kids) and a Harvey Award (Best Original Graphic Publication For Younger Readers).

North has written for several Marvel Comics series, including The Unbeatable Squirrel Girl, Power Pack, and Inhumans: Once and Future Kings.

On January 21, 2013, Shiftylook.com launched Galaga, a comic written by North and illustrated by Christopher Hastings and colored by Anthony Clark, the creators of The Adventures of Dr. McNinja. The comic is based on the 1981 arcade shooter of the same name.

On July 21, 2017, two of North's projects were awarded Eisner Awards: "Best Publication for Teens (ages 13-17)" for The Unbeatable Squirrel Girl (with Erica Henderson), and "Best Humor Publication" for Jughead (with Chip Zdarsky, Henderson, and Derek Charm).

On September 15, 2020, Archaia published a graphic novel adaptation of Kurt Vonnegut's Slaughterhouse-Five, which was adapted by North and illustrated by Albert Monteys.

In July 2022, North announced two upcoming comics projects via his newsletter. The first is Star Trek: Lower Decks —a limited series based on the animated series of the same name—with artist Chris Fenoglio; the first issue is scheduled to be published in September 2022 by IDW Publishing. The second is a YA graphic novel, titled Danger and Other Unknown Risks, with artist Henderson; North and Henderson were co-creators on Squirrel Girl. This graphic novel is described as a "dystopian fantasy" and is scheduled to be published in April 2023 by Penguin Teen.

In November 2022, North launched a new volume of Fantastic Four with artist Iban Coello.

In October 2024, at New York Comic Con, it was announced that North was heading up Marvel's 2025 event One World Under Doom. The event follows Doctor Doom who, after being granted the title of Sorcerer Supreme during the events of Blood Hunt, declares himself emperor of the world. The event began in February 2025, with the main miniseries written by North and drawn by R.B. Silva.

He will next write Hulk: Smash Everything.

=== Webcomic tools ===
North created three tools to aid webcomic authors: Oh No Robot, a webcomic transcription tool that creates searchable text databases for comics; RSSpect, a method of creating RSS feeds for websites; and Project Wonderful, a pay-per-day auction-based ad serving system. The first two were free, whereas the last took 25% of each sale. Only Oh No Robot remains.

== Books and other writing ==
During his academic career, North co-authored three papers on computational linguistics.

Some of North's original comedy writing appears on the website Madhouse, including Robot Erotica, and prank emails such as attempts to stop other people named "Ryan North" from using his name.

In November 2006, Ryan North created the site Every Topic in the Universe Except Chickens, which purports to provide a solution to vandalism on Wikipedia, in that it encourages vandals to vandalize only the article on chickens: "...instead of vandalizing Wikipedia in general, we all just vandalize the chicken article." North reasoned that it was worth trading the reliability of the chicken article if it meant freeing the rest of the encyclopedia from the threat of vandalism because "Dudes already know about chickens." The site received media attention.

A collection of short stories titled Machine of Death was released October 2010 through Bearstache Books. The book, featuring stories and illustrations by various authors and artists, was based on a Dinosaur Comics comic by North of December 5, 2005, with the premise of a machine that predicts the manner of a person's death accurately but in a difficult to understand manner. North was one of its editors, and contributed one of the stories. Machine of Death reached #1 on Amazon.com, beating Glenn Beck and drawing criticism from him as exemplifying a "liberal culture of death".

In November 2012, North launched a Kickstarter project to fund a book entitled To Be or Not to Be: That Is the Adventure, a retelling of Shakespeare's Hamlet modelled on Choose Your Own Adventure novels. The project raised more than six times its $20,000 goal in less than a week, and closed on December 22, 2012, having raised $580,905, nearly thirty times its original goal, and a record for a Kickstarter publishing project at that time. The book allows readers to take the role of Hamlet, Ophelia or Hamlet's father and make their own choices throughout the story; the latter characters, as well as over 100 colour illustrations by a range of artists, were added to the book as funding increased. The book made a New York Times Bestseller list. In 2016, Ryan published a similar book titled Romeo and/or Juliet. There are 46,012,475,909,287,476 possible adventures in it. The book received generally positive coverage. In 2017, he released another book continuing this theme titled "William Shakespeare Punches a Friggin' Shark", which puts the reader into the role of William Shakespeare himself, with "but two goals in your life: 1) become the greatest author of all time, and 2) punch a friggin' shark". The book has over 40 unique endings, and features illustrations by several other web cartoonists and writers.

In 2017 Ryan North is attributed as writing for the video game Hiveswap: Act 1.

In 2018, Riverhead Books published Ryan North's How to Invent Everything: A Survival Guide for the Stranded Time Traveler, a nonfiction guide to technology based around the fictional premise of a time machine stranding the reader in the past, with illustrations by Lucy Bellwood. It was named one of NPR's and BBC Science Focus's Best Books of 2018.

In 2019, North helped develop the story and writing for an iOS game app called AVO! by Playdeo Limited

North wrote the 2021 action-adventure video game Lost in Random, published by Electronic Arts.

In April 2022, North was the writer for the six-episode podcast series Marvel's Squirrel Girl: The Unbeatable Radio Show which is a direct continuation of the comic series he wrote; the series is produced by Radio Point, directed by Giovanna Sardelli and stars Milana Vayntrub as Squirrel Girl.

== Awards ==
Year	Nominated work	Category	Result	Notes
2025	Star Trek Lower Decks: Warp Your Own Way	Aurora Award for Best Graphic Novel	Won	Created by North and Chris Fenoglio
2025	Star Trek Lower Decks: Warp Your Own Way	Hugo Award for Best Graphic Story	Won	Created by North and Chris Fenoglio
2024	Danger and Other Unknown Risks	Eisner Award: Best Publication for Teens	Won	Created by North and Erica Henderson
2024	Star Trek: Day of Blood—Shax's Best Day	Eisner Award: Best Single Issue/One-Shot	Nominated	Created by North and Derek Charm
2017	The Unbeatable Squirrel Girl	Eisner Award: Best Publication for Teens (ages 13–17)	Won	Illustrated by Erica Henderson
2017	Jughead	Eisner Award: Best Humor Publication	Won	Created by Chip Zdarsky, North, Erica Henderson, and Derek Charm
2017	Romeo and/or Juliet: A Chooseable-Path Adventure	Alex Award	Won	
2017	(multiple comics)	Joe Shuster Award: Outstanding Writer	Nominated	
2016	The Unbeatable Squirrel Girl	Eisner Award: Best New Series	Nominated	Illustrated by Erica Henderson
2016	(multiple comics)	Joe Shuster Award: Outstanding Writer	Nominated	
2015	(multiple comics)	Joe Shuster Award: Outstanding Writer	Nominated	
2015	The Midas Flesh	Joe Shuster Award: The Dragon Award (Comics for Kids)	Nominated	
2014	Adventure Time	Harvey Awards: Best Original Graphic Publication for Younger Readers	Won	
2014	Adventure Time	Harvey Awards: Special Award for Humor	Won	
2014	(multiple comics)	Joe Shuster Award: Outstanding Writer	Nominated	
2013	Adventure Time	Eisner Award: Best Publication for Kids (ages 8–12)	Won	
2013	Adventure Time	Harvey Awards: Best Original Graphic Publication for Younger Readers	Won	
2013	Adventure Time	Harvey Awards: Special Award for Humor	Won	
2013	Adventure Time	Eisner Award: Best New Series	Nominated	
2013	Adventure Time	Eisner Award: Best Humor Publication	Nominated	
2013	Adventure Time	Sushter Awards: Outstanding Writer	Nominated	
2005	Dinosaur Comics	Web Cartoonists' Choice Awards: Outstanding Anthropomorphic Comic	Won	In the same year, Dinosaur Comics was also nominated for Outstanding Writing, Outstanding Comedic Comic, and Outstanding Short Form Comic.

== Personal life ==
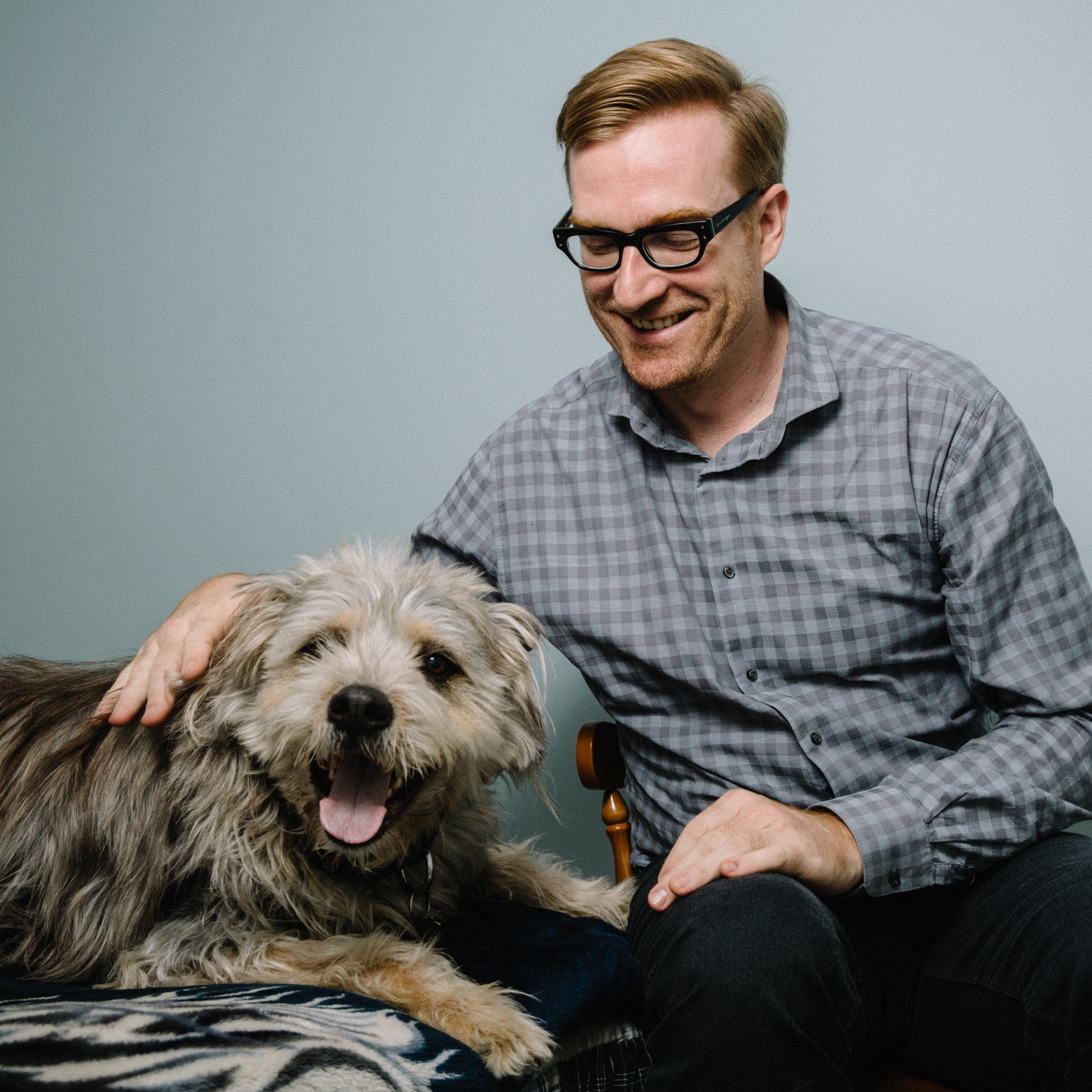
North (right) in 2018, with his dog Noam Chompsky

North was born in Osgoode, Ontario, in 1980. His parents are Anna and Randall North and said in an interview that he has a younger brother, Victor. In an interview, North said that his family lived in rural Osgoode and there was not a lot to do, so spent much of his time on the computer. After high school, he studied computer science at Carleton University in Ottawa, then did his master's degree in computer science at the University of Toronto in Toronto, specializing in computational linguistics.

North once hosted instructions on his website for building cardboard boxes designed to look like elements of Super Mario Bros., designed by his friend Posterchild. In 2006, a group of teenage girls in Ravenna, Ohio were arrested after they created and distributed several of these blocks, over fears they were bombs.

On August 18, 2015, North became stuck in a skate pit with only an umbrella, a leash, his phone, and his dog, Noam Chompsky, after rain made the surface too slick to easily climb with a dog in tow. He posted about his conundrum on Twitter, leading hundreds of Twitter users to reply with suggestions on how to combine the items in his "inventory" to escape, eventually leading to success. Chompsky died in October 2022.

North is married to Jenn Klug. As of 2016, they lived in Leslieville, Toronto, Ontario.

== Bibliography ==
- Author, The Best of Dinosaur Comics: 2003-2005 AD (April 15, 2006, Quack!Media) ISBN 0-7560-0518-3
- Author, Dinosaur Comics: Dudes Already Know About Chickens (2010, TopatoCo) ISBN 978-0-9824862-6-9
- Editor and contributor, Machine of Death: A Collection of Stories About People Who Know How They Will Die (October 13, 2010, Machines of Death) ISBN 0-9821671-2-1
- Author, Everybody Knows Failure Is Just Success Rounded Down: Dinosaur Comics (2011, TopatoCo) ISBN 978-1-936561-90-2
- Author, To Be or Not to Be: That Is the Adventure (2013, Breadpig) ISBN 978-0-9828537-4-0
- Editor, This Is How You Die; Stories of the Inscrutable, Infallible, Inescapable Machine of Death (2013, Grand Central Publishing) ISBN 978-1455529391
- Author, The Midas Flesh Vol. 1 (2014, BOOM! Box) ISBN 978-1608864553
- Author, The Midas Flesh Vol. 2 (2015, BOOM! Box) ISBN 978-1608867271
- Author, Romeo and/or Juliet: A Chooseable-Path Adventure (2016, Riverhead Books) ISBN 978-1101983300
- Author, How to Be a T.Rex (2018, Dial Books) ISBN 978-0399186240
- Author, How to Invent Everything: A Survival Guide for the Stranded Time Traveler (2018, Riverhead Books) ISBN 978-0735220140
- Author, Slaughterhouse-Five: The Graphic Novel (2020, Archaia) ISBN 978-1684156252
- Writer, The Mystery of the Meanest Teacher: A Johnny Constantine Graphic Novel (2021, DC) ISBN 978-1-779501-23-3
- Author, How to Take Over the World: Practical Schemes and Scientific Solutions for the Aspiring Supervillain (2022, Riverhead Books) ISBN 9780593192016
- Author, Danger And Other Unknown Risks: A Graphic Novel (2023, Penguin Workshop) ISBN 978-0593224823

=== Comics ===
Archie Comics

- Jughead #9–14 (September 2016–June 2017)
  - Collected in Jughead Vol. 2 (contains #9–11, trade paperback, 2017, ISBN 978-1682559987)
  - Collected in Jughead Vol. 3 (contains #12–14, trade paperback, 2017, ISBN 978-1682559567)

IDW Publishing

- Star Trek: Lower Decks #1–3 (illustrated by Chris Fenoglio, September–November 2022)
  - Collected in Star Trek: Lower Decks (trade paperback, 2023, ISBN 978-1684059621)
- Star Trek: Day of Blood - Shaxs' Best Day #1 (September 2023)
  - Collected in Star Trek: Day of Blood (hardcover, 2024, ISBN 979-8887240732)
- Star Trek: Lower Decks—Warp Your Own Way (trade paperback, 2024, ISBN 979-8887241548)
- Star Trek: Lower Decks (vol. 2) #1–present (illustrated by Derek Charm, November 2024–present)

KaBOOM! Studios

- Adventure Time #1–35, 75 (February 2012–December 2014, April 2018)
  - Collected in Adventure Time Vol. 1 (#1–4, trade paperback, 2012, ISBN 978-1608862801)
- Bill & Ted's Most Triumphant Return #1–6 (March – August 2015)

Marvel Comics

- The Unbeatable Squirrel Girl #1–8 (January–August 2015)
  - Collected in The Unbeatable Squirrel Girl Vol. 1: Squirrel Power
  - Collected in The Unbeatable Squirrel Girl Vol. 2: Squirrel You Know It's True
- The Unbeatable Squirrel Girl (vol. 2) #1–50 (October 2015–November 2019)
- Howard the Duck (vol. 6) #6 (co-written with Chip Zdarsky, illustrated by Joe Quinones, April 2016)
  - Collected in Howard the Duck Vol. 1: Duck Hunt (trade paperback, 2016, ISBN 978-0785199380)
  - Collected in Howard the Duck by Zdarsky & Quinones (hardcover, 2022, ISBN 978-1302932015)
- Power Pack #1–5 (illustrated by Nico Leon, November 2020–April 2021)
  - Collected in Power Pack: The Powers That Be (trade paperback, 2021, ISBN 978-1302924362)
- Fantastic Four (vol. 7) #1–33 (November 2022–June 2025)
- Secret Invasion #1–5 (illustrated by Francesco Mobili, November 2022–March 2023)
  - Collected in Secret Invasion: Mission Earth (trade paperback, 2023, ISBN 978-1302934729)
- One World Under Doom #1–9 (illustrated by R. B. Silva, February 2025–November 2025)
  - Collected in One World Under Doom (trade paperback, 2026, ISBN 978-1302958169)
- Godzilla vs. Fantastic Four #1 (illustrated by John Romita Jr., March 2025)
  - Collected in Godzilla vs. the Marvel Universe (trade paperback, 2025, ISBN 978-1302964887)
- Fantastic Four (vol. 8) #1–present (July 2025–present)
- Hulk: Smash Everything

DC Comics

- Krypto: The Last Dog of Krypton #1–5 (June–October 2025)
  - Collected in Krypto: The Last Dog of Krypton (trade paperback, 2026, ISBN 978-1799505907)
- The Flash (vol. 6) #31–present (March 2026–present)
