= Blook =

Printed book based on blog content

A blook is a printed book that contains or is based on content from a blog.

The first printed blook was User Interface Design for Programmers, by Joel Spolsky, published by Apress on June 26, 2001, based on his blog Joel on Software. An early blook was written by Tony Pierce in 2002 when he compiled selected posts from his one-year-old blog and turned the collection into a book called Blook. The name came about when Pierce held a contest, asking his readers to suggest a title for the book. Jeff Jarvis of BuzzMachine won the contest and subsequently invented the term. Pierce went on to publish two other blooks, How To Blog and Stiff.

Print-on-demand publisher Lulu inaugurated the Lulu Blooker Prize for blooks, which was first awarded in 2006. The printed blook phenomenon is not limited to self-publishing. Several popular bloggers have signed book deals with major publishers to write books based on their blogs. However, some publishers are starting to realize that blog popularity does not translate to sales. Blog to book conversions via traditional publishing houses still happen, but the focus has shifted from blog popularity to content quality.

"Blook" was short-listed in 2006 for inclusion in the Oxford English Dictionary and was a runner-up for Word of the Year.

== See also ==
- Digital library
- List of digital library projects
- Dynabook
- Elibrary
- Expanded Books
- Networked book
- Webserial
- OpenReader Consortium
- Project Gutenberg
