= Goblins (webcomic) =

Webcomic by Ellipsis Stephens

- Webcomic logo
- Author: Ellipsis Hana Horner
- Website: goblinscomic.org
- Current status/schedule: Active
- Launch date: June 2005
- Genre: Fantasy

Goblins is a webcomic by Ellipsis Horner.

== Premise ==
Goblins started in 2005, and as of 2025 is still updating. It is part of Hiveworks Comics.

The comic's setting is based on a Dungeons & Dragons role-playing game and parodies these games, in that the rules of reality follow game mechanics; characters are aware of this and can take advantage of these rules. The story follows both a group of goblins, including Chief, Big Ears, Fumbles, Thaco and Complains-of-Names. It also follows Minmax and Forgath, "adventurers" based on RPG player characters. Goblins mixes comedy with bleak situations and gruesome violence.

== Reception ==
Goblins won the 2011 and 2012 Aurora Awards, a Canadian literary award, for Best English Graphic Novel.
