= Least I Could Do =

Webcomic by Ryan Sohmer and Lar deSouza

- Author: Ryan Sohmer; Ryan Costello
- Illustrator: Lar de Souza
- Website: http://www.leasticoulddo.com
- Current status/schedule: Every day of the week
- Launch date: February 10, 2003
- Publisher: Blind Ferret Entertainment
- Genre: Comedy/Adult/Slice-of-life

Least I Could Do (LICD) is a humor webcomic by Ryan Sohmer and Lar deSouza (also the creators of the fantasy webcomic Looking for Group). The strip debuted on February 10, 2003. Past artists for the strip include J Horsley III from y2cl, who dropped out before the strip launched, Trevor Adams, who was on board for about six months, then Chad W. M. Porter, who drew the strip for two years.

Least I Could Do is produced by Blind Ferret Entertainment, which owns the rights to the strip. The primary theme of the strip is sexuality, especially the promiscuity of the primary character, Rayne Summers, who is loosely based upon Sohmer himself.

The strip updates every day. Sunday features Least I Could Do: Beginnings, a strip following Rayne at age 8 with storylines unrelated to the main strip. Story lines tend to last for only a few strips, but some have gone several weeks.

== History ==
The original artist for the strip was Trevor Adams, who drew the strip from its debut until July 18, 2003, later moving on to create his own comic Gemini Paradox. Chad Porter took over on July 28, 2003. In late 2004, I Have My Moments, a full-color book featuring the first year of LICD with Porter as the artist, was published.

In early 2005, the strip underwent a major change with the introduction of a new character, Noel, Rayne's friend. Noel was often given roles that previously would have gone to the character John Gold, whose frequency in the strip had been reduced. Rayne soon became a business executive on falsified credentials, with the intent of sleeping with the CEO of IDS Enterprises, Marcy McKean.

Least I Could Do "3.0" launched on August 15, 2005 with the departure of Porter as the artist. Lar deSouza, a long time friend of Sohmer and his artistic partner on the daily comic In Other News, took over as the artist. The comic and website have been undergoing some major changes as a result.

December 2005 marked the publication of My Will Be Done, the complete 2nd-year collection featuring Chad Porter's final strips for the comic. It also included a mini-comic drawn by Lar, depicting the origins of "Bra-Man". In July 2006 the first Bra-Man comic was released.

In November 2006, Because I Can, the 3rd year collection, and the first to feature current artist Lar deSouza was published.

In the July 9, 2007 strip, the cast opened a "letter" from the writer and artist which stated that from that moment on, they would age normally rather than remain a perpetual age 24 or so. Since then, the strip's characters have enacted major life changes: notably, Noel moved in with and later married his girlfriend, and Rayne, in a plot arc beginning in September, experimented with monogamy.

In 2010, Sohmer announced that deSouza will be re-drawing the original strips done by Trevor Adams in the current artistic style.

== Main characters ==
Though the primary character is Rayne, there are a large number of supporting characters, and the strip will sometimes go for up to a week without a strip featuring Rayne. These usually involve large story arcs involving the other characters, though Least I Could Do still specializes in the one strip joke.

=== Rayne ===
Rayne Summers is the protagonist of "Least I Could Do". He is a shallow, childlike, and sexually driven 24-year-old (now 43) with an underdeveloped emotional intelligence as well as a severe superiority complex. Rayne shares a joyful sibling rivalry with his older brother Eric Summers, who is a surgeon. In the 2006 storyline, Rayne and Eric found out they had a sister they never knew about, and a niece named Ashley. Rayne eventually takes a liking to his niece, despite a rocky start, and eventually comes to care for her as a surrogate father, with Ashley considering him her favourite Unca.

As the comic progressed, Rayne's character developed and has been dealing with increased maturity and vulnerability. It was revealed that much of Rayne's promiscuity and childishness came as a reaction to severe depression caused by his inability to settle down and his fear of change. His promiscuity has become less and less of a theme as the strip has progressed, and as of March 8, 2014, he is in an exclusive relationship with the character Jumpmaster Julie who first appeared on August 23, 2006.

=== Noel ===
Noel is Rayne's best friend, a later addition to the strip, first appearing on January 5, 2005. Noel's first appearances lined up with a period in which the Rayne character needed a comedic foil. Noel is the calm, sardonic yin to Rayne's yang, and although he is more than willing to participate in Rayne's insane schemes, he has learned to sit back and watch the carnage rather than get too involved. Although introduced as Rayne's wingman, Noel soon found himself in a serious relationship with Kate, a woman he met at a speed dating event. Over the course of the comic, they married and had three children: A boy, Logan (named after the X-Man) and twins Lucas and Leia.

=== Issa ===
Melissa "Issa" Allie is one of Rayne's few platonic female friends. An extremely gorgeous redhead with a voluptuous figure and natural yellow eyes, Issa is the object of Rayne's frequent sexual advances which she continually rejects. Despite this, it sometimes seems as though she has a slight subconscious crush on him. When she introduced her friends to her farmer-boyfriend, Huck, the crew noted his resemblance to Rayne. Despite her attractiveness and continual disgust at some of their antics, Issa still manages to play the voice of reason and fits in with Rayne and the rest of the boys. She is not above manipulating her male friends, such as offering to try on underwear at Victoria's Secret for Rayne, in exchange for him accompanying her to the mall.

Issa has known Rayne since at least his teenage years, offering him advice after the relationship that started his womanizing streak, showing her to be one of Rayne's oldest friends. Issa holds the record for holding out against Rayne's advances. Rayne got her a job at IDS as a replacement for a staff member on maternity leave, although it remains to be seen if this is a permanent post. She and Michael Von Huntington, an IDS employee, are married and have a daughter.

=== Mick ===
Mick Alfa is an overweight and socially awkward friend of Rayne's, who is often used as a wingman. Rayne often enlists Mick in elaborate (and occasionally bizarre) charades to help him get laid. Mick is a TV program director, and has had a greater number of steady relationships than Rayne, Noel and John combined. Mick has been dating Tamara, a young college student, for two years. Mick also has a passion for potato chips. Recently, it has been revealed that Mick's father was murdered by his mother's lover, after which his mother went to prison and became a lesbian. In July 2011 it was revealed that Mick will be marrying Tamara (Tammy) after a six-year relationship.

=== John ===
John Gold is Rayne's childhood friend and roommate, who often acts as his foil. He continually expresses a resigned discontent with Rayne's promiscuity. John is looking for a wife, which has been shown to lead him into being somewhat needy and over-hasty in relationships. He is a grade school teacher. One relationship of John's was with a woman named Hannah, who became a major part of his life and even moved in with him, but eventually left him due to Rayne's antics. John's temptations are represented by a small Darth Vader, a parody of the shoulder devil cliché. The Darth Vader character frequently appears, not only to tempt him, but also to voice the darker thoughts that John represses. As of 2015, he moved from Rayne's apartment to a new house to start a family with his girlfriend Laura, whom he met in 2013.

== Books ==
As of 2009, there were six Least I Could Do collections published, which include the two years that the comic was drawn by Chad and the three years of deSouza's work. The second book includes a mini-comic drawn by Lar that explains the origins of Bra-Man. They have also printed the first edition of Bra-Man, a spin-off comic based on Rayne's drunken alter-ego and a book of Least I Could Do: Beginnings which tells stories about Rayne's childhood along with his friends and family.

=== Complete Year Collections ===
1. I Have My Moments: The Complete First Year Collection; December 2004 ISBN 0-9736946-0-2
2. My Will Be Done: The Complete Second Year Collection; December 2005 ISBN 0-9736946-1-0
3. Because I Can: The Complete Third Year Collection; December 2006 ISBN 0-9736946-2-9
4. I Love This Guy: The Complete Fourth Year Collection'; October 2007 ISBN 978-0-9736946-3-5
5. Yield To Me: The Complete Fifth Year Collection; September 2008 ISBN 978-0-9736946-8-0
6. I Am Not A Credible Source: The Complete Sixth Year Collection; November 2009 ISBN 978-0-9812163-6-2
7. I Can't Help You Here: The Complete Seventh Year Collection; ISBN 978-1-926838-03-8
8. I Must Do This: The Complete Eighth Year Collection; ISBN 978-1-926838-14-4
9. I Play To Win: The Complete Ninth Year Collection; ISBN 978-1-926838-23-6
10. The Answer May Surprise You: The Complete Tenth Year Collection; ISBN 978-1926838342
11. The Planet's Fine: The Complete Eleventh Year Collection; ISBN 978-1926838359
12. I Just Solved Everything: The Complete Twelfth Year Collection; ISBN 978-1926838366

=== Collections ===
1. Jesus Made Me Do It: Least I Could Do, Volume 1; November 2008 ISBN 978-0-9736946-5-9
2. Velcro Pants Are Awesome: Least I Could Do, Volume 2; June 2009 ISBN 978-0-9736946-9-7
3. My Eyes Are Up Here: Least I Could Do, Volume 3; February 2010 ISBN 978-0-9812163-5-5
4. I Wish You Were Chewbacca: Least I Could Do, Volume 4; April 2011 ISBN 978-0-9812163-8-6

=== Beginnings ===
1. Look At Me: A Month's Worth of Sundays of Least I Could Do Beginnings; June 2009 ISBN 978-0-9812163-3-1
2. Adorableness: Least I Could Do Beginnings, Volume 2; January 2010 ISBN 978-0-9812163-7-9
3. Fire In The Hole: Least I Could Do Beginnings, Volume 3 ISBN 978-1-926838-04-5
4. Don't Make This Weird: Least I Could Do Beginnings, Volume 4 ISBN 978-1-926838-07-6
5. I'll Field This One: Least I Could Do Beginnings, Volume 5; August 2012 ISBN 978-1-926838-17-5

=== Others ===
1. Bra-Man #1; July 2006
2. Least I Could Do: Noir et Blanc ISBN 978-1-926838-01-4

== Recurring features and related projects ==
=== Valentine's Day Contest ===
Since February 2004, Least I Could Do has had a yearly event in which fans can submit themselves to be 'dates' for one of the strip's characters, either primary or secondary. The selection process is shown in the comic, with the cast sorting through letters and often with Rayne attempting to be the selected date. Upon the decision, the fan is drawn into the strip, sharing a date with the cast member of their choice. If supporting cast members are selected, the date storyline often involves Rayne attempting to sabotage things, primarily out of jealousy for not being selected. The Valentine's storyline runs for roughly a week's time. In recent years, three of the five primary characters (Issa, Noel & Mick) are now officially in committed relationships, which calls into question whether or not the contest will be run differently and if said characters can still be selected by fans.

=== Looking For Group ===
Starting in 2006, Sohmer and DeSouza began a comic-fantasy webcomic called Looking For Group. Characters from Looking for Group have appeared in the background of a May 7, 2008 Least I could Do strip. Richard the Warlock and his rabbit also appeared during the CRISIS Arc on April 6, 2009 and incinerated a future version of Rayne. Krunch Bloodrage also appeared in the same arc, fighting Rayne's Audibot in the background of the April 10, 2009 strip.

=== Bra-Man ===
In July 2006, the first "Bra-Man" comic was released. The 24-page comic showcases the adventures of Bra-Man, Rayne Summers' alter-ego. Bra-Man No. 1 was written by Ryan Sohmer, drawn by Lar deSouza, and coloured by Marc Brunet.

=== Least I Could Do: Beginnings ===
On November 9, 2008, Sohmer and DeSouza announced that a new strip would appear on Sundays, thus having a strip every day of the week. Sohmer said, "For quite some time now, Lar and I have been toying with the idea of going to a 7-day a week schedule with LICD. While other creators seem to be cutting back on their output lately, we wanted to do more."

But, not wanting to do just another normal strip, Sohmer and DeSouza decided to start up "Beginnings," a Sunday-only strip on the website with storylines separate from the rest of the comic based around Rayne's childhood, specifically at 8 years old. Beginnings is similar in both format and artistic style to Calvin and Hobbes, which has been occasionally referenced in LICD, including Calvin's sled (with a stuffed tiger clearly visible) running over Noel and Rayne offering Calvin money to run him over again.

=== Animated series ===
Blind Ferret Entertainment and Teletoon had a development deal for an animated version of Least I Could Do; however, Blind Ferret opted out of the deal because it believed they would have to surrender too much creative control. Following the collapse of that deal, Sohmer entered into negotiations with an American network for a potential development deal. In response to the failed Teletoon deal, Sohmer subsequently created a Kickstarter project, asking fans for donations to produce a television pilot consistent with the original vision for an animated series. The project garnered over $100,000 in pledges in 2011.

=== Rayne Summers Webcomic Scholarship ===
In November 2009, Least I Could Do announced a scholarship program for students pursuing degrees in art with a focus on webcomics at The Center for Cartoon Studies in Vermont. Although the scholarship was originally announced to begin in the fall 2010 semester and cover full tuition, increasing to five students per year by 2015, no scholarships were ever distributed.

== Awards ==
- Wizbang!'s Weblog Awards:
  - 2006: Won for Best Comic Strip
- Cartoonist's Choice Awards:
  - 2007: Nominated for Outstanding Comedic Comic
- Schuster Awards:
  - 2008: Won for Outstanding Canadian Webcomics Creator/Creative Team for Least I Could Do and Looking for Group
  - 2009: Nominated for Outstanding Webcomic
- Harvey Awards:
  - 2009: Nominated for Best Cartoonist
  - 2009: Nominated for Best Online Comics Work
  - 2009: Nominated for Humor in Comics
