= My War: Killing Time in Iraq =

2005 book by Colby Buzzell

- Author: Colby Buzzell
- Language: English
- Genre: Nonfiction
- Publication date: 2005
- Publication place: United States
- Media type: Print
- ISBN: 978-0399153273

My War: Killing Time in Iraq is a 2005 book by Colby Buzzell recounting the author's November 2003 – January 2005 deployment to post-invasion Iraq in the U.S. Army.

== Description ==
My War focuses on the down-to-earth experiences of a soldier, chronicling the daily life, absurdities and ennui in addition to the combat events. Its blunt, unrefined style has been praised for honesty as well as criticized for the heavy use of profanities. It incorporates some material from Buzzell's early journal and much from his later milblog of the same name, which became highly popular in its scant few weeks of operation.
