= Star Trek: Lower Decks season 5 =

Star Trek: Lower Decks
- Season 5
- Promotional poster with art by Matt Ferguson, parodying a poster for the film Star Trek V: The Final Frontier (1989) by Bob Peak
- Showrunner: Mike McMahan
- Starring: Tawny Newsome; Jack Quaid; Noël Wells; Eugene Cordero; Dawnn Lewis; Jerry O'Connell; Fred Tatasciore; Gillian Vigman
- No. of episodes: 10

Release
- Original network: Paramount+
- Original release: October 24 – December 19, 2024

Season chronology
- ← Previous; Season 4

The fifth and final season of the American adult animated television series Star Trek: Lower Decks is set in the 24th century and follows the adventures of the low-ranking officers with menial jobs on the starship Cerritos, one of Starfleet's least important starships. The season is produced by CBS Eye Animation Productions in association with Secret Hideout, Important Science, Roddenberry Entertainment, and animation studio Titmouse, with Mike McMahan serving as showrunner and Barry J. Kelly as supervising director.

Tawny Newsome, Jack Quaid, Noël Wells, and Eugene Cordero voice the lower decks crew members of the Cerritos, with Dawnn Lewis, Jerry O'Connell, Fred Tatasciore, and Gillian Vigman providing voices for the ship's senior officers. A fifth season of Lower Decks was ordered in March 2023. Writing had begun by then and was nearly complete that October, when McMahan said it was possible that this could be the last season of the series. Voice recording was delayed by 2023 SAG-AFTRA strike and mostly took place between November 2023 and February 2024. In April, Paramount+ confirmed that the fifth season would be the last.

The season premiered on the streaming service Paramount+ on October 24, 2024, with its first two episodes. The rest of the 10-episode run was released weekly until December 19. The season received a Primetime Creative Arts Emmy Award nomination for its sound editing and several other awards and nominations.

== Episodes ==
Star Trek: Lower Decks season 5 episodes
No. overall	No. in season	Title	Directed by	Written by	Original release date
41	1	"Dos Cerritos"	Megan Lloyd	Aaron Burdette	October 24, 2024
The USS Cerritos is sucked into a parallel universe populated by alternate versions of the crew who have made slightly different life choices. The two crews work together to return the "Prime" Cerritos to its own universe. The captain of the alternate Cerritos is the harsh, disciplinarian counterpart of Lieutenant Beckett Mariner. Wanting to return to being a loose-cannon junior officer again, she kidnaps Prime Mariner and takes her place on the Prime Cerritos. Prime Mariner escapes and convinces the alternate Cerritos crew to get the attention of the Prime Cerritos, allowing the two Mariners to swap back. Meanwhile, former Cerritos crew member D'Vana Tendi leads a crew of Orion pirates to pay off a debt to her sister D'Erika, but longs to return to Starfleet. D'Erika offers to forgive the debt if D'Vana salvages a derelict Orion medical vessel, but D'Vana's crew comes into conflict with a rival clan of Blue Orions. They subdue the Blue Orions non-lethally and salvage the ship. The Blue Orions declare war on the Tendi clan, and D'Vana postpones returning to Starfleet to help her family win the war.
42	2	"Shades of Green"	Bob Suarez	Keith Foglesong	October 24, 2024
The Pirate Queen of Orion orders the war between the Tendis and the Blue Orions to be resolved with a dangerous race through an asteroid field. D'Vana learns that D'Erika is pregnant and becomes overprotective of her sister, interfering with the race and causing them to crash. D'Erika says she hid her pregnancy so D'Vana would not feel obliged to mentor the child instead of returning to Starfleet. The sisters reconcile and finish the race in a tie; the queen decrees that both clans must forfeit their wealth. Meanwhile, the Cerritos helps the planet Targalus IX adjust to its new post-scarcity economy. Two ensigns are kidnapped by formerly wealthy Targalans who resent the loss of their status. They survive by following advice from Lieutenant Brad Boimler and are rescued by Boimler and Mariner. Lieutenant T'Lyn tries to help Lieutenant Sam Rutherford by repairing a shuttle, but he explains that he has been saving it to repair with D'Vana, so T'Lyn wrecks the shuttle again. When D'Vana returns to the Cerritos she asks for the discarded Targalan gold and jewels to be given to her family, restoring their wealth.
43	3	"The Best Exotic Nanite Hotel"	Brandon Williams	Stephanie Amante-Ritter	October 31, 2024
The Cerritos is sent to a space hotel where Mariner, Rutherford, Tendi, and T'Lyn are tasked with capturing a nanite swarm that is consuming technology and energy. They are joined by Mariner's ex-girlfriend Jennifer Sh'reyan, whom Mariner ghosted. Jennifer acts as if they are still dating, and the others encourage Mariner to have a mature conversation about ending their relationship. Boimler joins Commander Jack Ransom in locating Admiral Milius, who has gone AWOL. Boimler suspects Ransom is using him as cannon fodder and briefly sides with Milius, who is resentful of Starfleet after being assigned uninteresting missions. Ransom says he chose Boimler for the mission because of his preparedness and bravery, and Boimler helps subdue Milius. Jennifer admits that she was pretending to still be dating as a way to force Mariner to talk. The two apologize and formalize their breakup. Rutherford finds a way to disable the nanites and discovers that they were controlled by a microscopic Starfleet ship from a parallel universe. Milius is happy when he is assigned to help the ship return home.
44	4	"A Farewell To Farms"	Megan Lloyd	Diana Tay	November 7, 2024
The Klingon officer Ma'ah is forced to return to his family farm after being stripped of his captaincy for allowing his crew to mutiny. He is visited by Boimler and Mariner, who offer to help him regain his command. However, Ma'ah is less than enthusiastic, as he would be forced to serve under Bargh, the leader of the Klingon Oversight Council, who abuses his position to deny Ma'ah's appeals because Ma'ah killed his brother. With encouragement from Boimler, Ma'ah fights and kills Bargh and resolves to start his career anew with his brother Malor as his first officer. Ma'ah then helps the pair to study a new parallel-universe rift in Klingon space; they discover the rifts are not a natural occurrence. Meanwhile, the Cerritos is escorting two food critics back to the homeworld of Dr. Migleemo, the ship's psychologist. Migleemo's attempts to impress them with his cooking only receive negative criticism. Tendi, Rutherford, and Captain Carol Freeman expose the critics as frauds who have lost their sense of taste; Migleemo offers to provide therapy, earning their respect.
45	5	"Starbase 80?!"	Bob Suarez	May Darmon	November 14, 2024
The Cerritos is forced to dock at Starbase 80, which has a legendary negative reputation among Starfleet. The starbase is understaffed and supplied with obsolete equipment. Mariner, who was previously assigned to Starbase 80, believes the place to be cursed, especially when members of the Cerritos crew start acting like zombies. Ultimately, it is revealed that the phenomenon was caused by an "anaphasic lifeform" named Clem, whom the Cerritos unknowingly picked up on a previous mission, unintentionally possessing them in a failed attempt to communicate. Having proven to be harmless, Clem is invited to remain at Starbase 80. Having gained a new appreciation for the legendary starbase, the Cerritos crew helps to repair many of its issues. Meanwhile, having learned that her alternate-universe counterpart was assigned to Starbase 80, Freeman becomes obsessed with avoiding her counterpart's mistake. The station's chief engineer sends her and Ransom on a wild-goose chase through the starbase in order to help him with repairs, and they end up trying to capture a giant bat even after the situation with Clem is resolved.
46	6	"Of Gods and Angles"	Brandon Williams	Aaron Burdette	November 21, 2024
The Cerritos hosts peace talks between two photonic species, the Cubes and the Orbs. Meanwhile, Mariner sees a kindred spirit in Ensign Olly, a descendant of the alien entity the ancient Greeks worshipped as Zeus, and takes her under her wing as they investigate the disappearance of the son and daughter of the leading delegates. Olly ends up hampering the investigation due to her anxiety about being dismissed from Starfleet because of her weak but uncontrolled divine lightning powers, inflaming tensions between the Cubes and the Orbs, who start a war with the Cerritos caught in the middle. Olly uses the tractor beam to incapacitate them, proving her value as a Starfleet officer. It is revealed that the delegates' children are in love and have produced their own hybrid child, inspiring renewed peace talks. Meanwhile, Boimler, trying to emulate his more successful alternate-universe counterpart, attempts to befriend the cantankerous physician Dr. T'Ana.
47	7	"Fully Dilated"	Megan Lloyd	Andrew Mueth	November 28, 2024
Mariner, Tendi and T'Lyn go undercover to a pre-industrial planet, Dilmer III, which is subject to time dilation such that a week passes on the planet for every second on the Cerritos. Their mission is to prevent the locals from discovering Starfleet technology from yet another parallel universe, which turns out to be the head of the android Starfleet officer Data. However, Boimler and Rutherford's latest attempt to emulate Boimler's alternate-universe counterpart accidentally disables the transporter, forcing the three women to spend a year on the planet during the minute it takes to repair the transporter. Believing she is competing with T'Lyn for the position of senior science officer, Tendi desperately tries to outdo T'Lyn in scientific achievement; she reactivates Data's head while T'Lyn develops innovations in local agriculture. They draw the attention of a suspicious Dilmerian named Snell, who tries to expose them as witches, but they are able to discredit him in front of his community. After they are returned to the Cerritos, before returning to his home universe, Data recommends to Captain Freeman that she promote both Tendi and T'Lyn.
48	8	"Upper Decks"	Bob Suarez	Cullen Crawford	December 5, 2024
The senior officers of the Cerritos go about a typical day. Freeman has a full schedule attending performances and rituals to support crew members. Chief engineer Billups deals with a crisis of cascading equipment failures. Ransom manages a team of squabbling ensigns wrangling a herd of Buhgoons—space creatures with cloaking capabilities—for inspection by a visiting ecologist; Ransom feigns incompetence to help the ensigns work together by redirecting their hostility towards himself instead of each other. Security chief Shaxs meditates to deal with his trauma from the Cardassian occupation of his planet Bajor, imagining himself killing a mountain of Cardassians and his own younger self. T'Ana, having been criticized for not providing enough painkillers to her patients, subjects herself to painful treatments to prove her point. When the ecologist reveals himself as the leader of a team of alien Clickets aiming to use the Buhgoons' cloaking ability to dominate the galaxy, the crew fights back; Freeman remembers that Clickets hate to be complimented and praises the attackers until they retreat. At the end of the day, Freeman's husband arrives on the Cerritos to celebrate their anniversary, having been invited by the captain's aide Stevens.
49	9	"Fissure Quest"	Brandon Williams	Lauren McGuire	December 12, 2024
William Boimler, a clone of Brad created in a transporter accident, captains the starship Anaximander on a mission to find and stop the source of the recent interdimensional rifts which threaten the multiverse. His crew includes alternate-reality versions of characters from other Star Trek series, including multiple copies of Ensign Harry Kim, and picks up an alternate Mariner who is an engineer. Mariner devises a way to track the vessel creating the rifts. Its captain is an alternate Lily Sloane (the co-inventor of warp drive), who instead invented interdimensional travel; the rifts are an unintended side effect of her vessel. Sloane agrees to help return the interdimensional crew home. The only Harry Kim to have achieved the rank of Lieutenant hijacks Sloane's ship and kidnaps the other Kims to take them to a reality where they are respected, although he beams the others out when they resist. The damaged ship explodes after entering the rift, creating an energy wave that threatens to destroy the multiverse. William directs the wave to his own universe, trusting that his counterpart and friends on the Cerritos will find a solution in time.
50	10	"The New Next Generation"	Megan Lloyd	Mike McMahan	December 19, 2024
After receiving William Boimler's message, the Cerritos is dispatched to close the rift, which is extending a "Schrödinger possibility field" that is having strange effects on everything in the vicinity. Meanwhile, Ma'ah and his brother Malor, on the run from Bargh's vengeful sister Relga, seek asylum on the Cerritos, which comes under attack by Relga's fleet. Ensign Olly uses her powers to drain Relga's shields, causing her ship to be destroyed by the rift. Although the Cerritos suffers from the effects of the Schrödinger field, it is able to reach the rift thanks to Tendi and T'lyn's coordination. Unable to close it, Mariner creates a dam that contains the destructive energy but leaves the rift permanently open. Starfleet begins a mission to explore the multiverse, overseen by Freeman and her husband from aboard Starbase 80 – which is immune to the rift's effects due to its outdated systems – and joined by the Anaximander crew. Ma'ah is given command of Relga's fleet while Jack Ransom is promoted to captain of the Cerritos. Before setting out on new adventures, Ransom promotes both Boimler and Mariner to provisional first officer and Rutherford decides to permanently remove his cybernetic implant.

== Cast and characters ==
=== Main ===
- Tawny Newsome as Beckett Mariner
- Jack Quaid as Brad Boimler and William Boimler
- Noël Wells as D'Vana Tendi
- Eugene Cordero as Sam Rutherford
- Dawnn Lewis as Carol Freeman
- Jerry O'Connell as Jack Ransom
- Fred Tatasciore as Shaxs
- Gillian Vigman as T'Ana

=== Recurring ===
- Jessica McKenna as Barnes
- Gabrielle Ruiz as T'Lyn
- Paul Scheer as Andy Billups
- Carl Tart as Kayshon
- Kari Wahlgren as L'Kar
- Ariel Winter as D'Erika Tendi
- Jon Curry as Ma'ah
- Paul F. Tompkins as Migleemo
- Sam Witwer as Malor
- Nicole Byer as Kassia Nox
- Saba Homayoon as Olly
- Charlotte Nicdao as Meredith

=== Notable guests ===
- Marcus Henderson as Jet Manhaver
- Lauren Lapkus as Jennifer Sh'reyan
- Mary Chieffo as K'Elarra
- Brent Spiner as Data
- Ben Rodgers as Steve Stevens
- James Sie as Westlake
- Jolene as T'Pol
- Andrew Robinson as Elim Garak
- Alexander Siddig as Julian Bashir
- Garrett Wang as Harry Kim
- Alfre Woodard as Lily Sloane

== Production ==
=== Development and writing ===
Paramount+ ordered a 10-episode fifth season of Star Trek: Lower Decks in March 2023. Creator and showrunner Mike McMahan said writing had begun by then, and he was writing the season finale that October. McMahan said further seasons beyond the fifth were not guaranteed, particularly after Paramount+ cancelled fellow animated series Star Trek: Prodigy and confirmed the final seasons of Star Trek: Discovery and Star Trek: Picard. Despite this, he was not writing the season finale to also serve as a series finale because he did not want to give the characters a definitive ending. In April 2024, Paramount+ confirmed that the fifth season would be the last.

=== Casting and voice recording ===
The series stars a group of ensigns that serve in the lower decks of the Cerritos: Tawny Newsome as Beckett Mariner, Jack Quaid as Brad Boimler, Noël Wells as D'Vana Tendi, and Eugene Cordero as Sam Rutherford. The ship's bridge crew, who have supporting roles, include Dawnn Lewis as Captain Carol Freeman, Jerry O'Connell as first officer Commander Jack Ransom, Fred Tatasciore as security chief Lieutenant Shaxs, and Gillian Vigman as chief medical officer Dr. T'Ana. In July 2023, shortly after voice recording for the season started, the 2023 SAG-AFTRA strike began. Though the animated series were not covered by the strike and the cast were allowed to continue recording, they chose not to out of solidarity for actors on live-action series. Recording for the season resumed after the strike ended in November, and Newsome had finished her work, except for some additional dialogue recording (ADR), by February 2024. She said the recording delays should not impact the overall production schedule for the season because they had been ahead of schedule when the strike began.

In October 2022, McMahan said he had been looking for a way to bring some of the characters from the series Star Trek: Enterprise into Lower Decks. He acknowledged that this was difficult due to Enterprise being set so much earlier in the Star Trek timeline than Lower Decks is, but he found a way to do it in the fifth season and was in early negotiations with some actors from that series to reprise their roles in the season by October 2023. Also returning from previous Star Trek series is Garrett Wang as Harry Kim from Star Trek: Voyager. Gabrielle Ruiz returns from previous seasons as T'Lyn.

=== Animation and design ===
Independent animation studio Titmouse provides the animation for the series, with Barry J. Kelly serving as supervising director. The animation style reflects the look of "prime time animated comedy" series such as The Simpsons, but with more detailed backgrounds and environments than is traditional for prime time animation.

== Marketing ==
Newsome, Cordero, and Ruiz held a panel for the series on Star Trek: The Cruise, a multi-day ship cruise featuring cast and crew from various Star Trek projects in February 2024. They discussed the series in general and teased the fifth season during the panel. Newsome, Cordero, and Lewis also teased the season during a similar panel at the ST-SF convention in San Francisco the next month. Kurtzman, McMahan, Newsome, Quaid, Wells, and O'Connell promoted the season during a "Star Trek Universe" panel at San Diego Comic-Con in July 2024. A trailer for the season was released during the event, which Adam B. Vary at Variety said was "filled with a litany of jokes with very little context behind them" which aligned with previous trailers for the series. Tasha Robinson at Polygon noted that the trailer is primarily a "sentimental celebration" of the previous seasons.

A final trailer for the season was released in October, revealing Wang's guest role as multiple versions of Harry Kim. Commentary on the trailer focused on the appearance of the Kims and other jokes. Also that month, McMahan, Newsome, Quaid, Wells, and Cordero promoted the series during a "Star Trek Universe" panel at New York Comic-Con. A clip from the season was shown and a new poster, parodying one for the film Star Trek V: The Final Frontier (1989), was released. Vice Press was set to release several key art posters for the season featuring art by Matt Ferguson, including the parody poster. The premiere episode was screened at the Newport Beach Film Festival on October 23, followed by a discussion with McMahan, Wells, Cordero, and O'Connell. As with the previous seasons, animation studio Titmouse released a shirt with a unique design on it alongside each episode. The designs were available for one week each, and fans who bought all ten received a bonus eleventh shirt. For this season, Newsome, Quaid, Wells, and Cordero each contributed a shirt design.

== Release ==
=== Streaming and broadcast ===
The season premiered on Paramount+ in the United States and Latin America on October 24, 2024, with its first two episodes. The rest of its 10-episode run was released weekly. Each episode is broadcast in Canada on the CTV Sci-Fi Channel.

=== Home media ===
The season was released on DVD and Blu-Ray in the U.S. on March 25, 2025. The physical release includes behind-the-scenes featurettes as well as audio commentaries with cast and crew.

== Reception ==
=== Critical response ===
Rotten Tomatoes reported 100% approval based on nine reviews. Metacritic, which uses a weighted average, assigned a score of 84 out of 100 based on reviews from 4 critics, indicating "universal acclaim".

=== Accolades ===
Accolades received by Star Trek: Lower Decks season 5
Year	Award	Category	Nominee(s)	Result	Ref.
2025	Annie Awards	Best Character Animation – TV/Media	Raymond Dunster	Nominated	
2025	Astra TV Awards	Best Animated Series	Star Trek: Lower Decks	Nominated	
2025	Astra TV Awards	Best Supporting Voice-Over Performance	Jack Quaid	Won	
2025	Dorian TV Awards	Best Animated Show	Star Trek: Lower Decks	Nominated	
2025	Hugo Awards	Best Dramatic Presentation, Short Form	Brandon Williams and Lauren McGuire (for "Fissure Quest")	Nominated	
2025	Hugo Awards	Best Dramatic Presentation, Short Form	Megan Lloyd and Mike McMahan (for "The New Next Generation")	Won	
2025	Nebula Awards	Ray Bradbury Award for Outstanding Dramatic Presentation	Star Trek: Lower Decks	Nominated	
2025	Primetime Creative Arts Emmy Awards	Outstanding Sound Editing For An Animated Program	James Lucero, Drew Guy, Konrad Piñon, James Singleton, John Wynn, Amber Funk, and Michael Britt (for "The New Next Generation")	Nominated	
2025	Saturn Awards	Best Animated Television Series	Star Trek: Lower Decks	Nominated	
