= Star Trek: Lower Decks season 4 =

Star Trek: Lower Decks
- Season 4
- Promotional poster with art by Matt Ferguson, parodying a poster for the film Star Trek IV: The Voyage Home (1986) by Bob Peak
- Showrunner: Mike McMahan
- Starring: Tawny Newsome; Jack Quaid; Noël Wells; Eugene Cordero; Dawnn Lewis; Jerry O'Connell; Fred Tatasciore; Gillian Vigman
- No. of episodes: 10

Release
- Original network: Paramount+
- Original release: September 7 – November 2, 2023

Season chronology
- ← Previous; Season 3 Next → Season 5

The fourth season of the American adult animated television series Star Trek: Lower Decks is set in the 24th century and follows the adventures of the low-ranking officers with menial jobs on the starship Cerritos, one of Starfleet's least important starships. The season was produced by CBS Eye Animation Productions in association with Secret Hideout, Important Science, Roddenberry Entertainment, and animation studio Titmouse, with Mike McMahan serving as showrunner and Barry J. Kelly as supervising director.

Tawny Newsome, Jack Quaid, Noël Wells, and Eugene Cordero voice the lower decks crew members of the Cerritos, with Dawnn Lewis, Jerry O'Connell, Fred Tatasciore, and Gillian Vigman providing voices for the ship's senior officers. A fourth season of Lower Decks was ordered in January 2022. Writing began by that April and was mostly completed by September, with voice recording starting by June. The season features many connections and references to past Star Trek media such as Star Trek: The Next Generation and Star Trek: Voyager, including several actors returning as guest stars.

The season premiered on the streaming service Paramount+ on September 7, 2023, with its first two episodes. The rest of the 10-episode run was released weekly until November 2. The season received a Primetime Creative Arts Emmy Award nomination for its sound editing and several other awards and nominations. A fifth and final season was ordered in March 2023.

== Episodes ==
Star Trek: Lower Decks season 4 episodes
No. overall	No. in season	Title	Directed by	Written by	Original release date
31	1	"Twovix"	Barry J. Kelly; Jason Zurek	Mike McMahan	September 7, 2023
The USS Cerritos is escorting the decommissioned USS Voyager to Earth, where it will become a museum. A dormant Delta Quadrant "macrovirus" is awakened and takes control of the ship. Ensign Brad Boimler is worried about making a mistake and not receiving an upcoming promotion, but after encouraging words from Ensign Beckett Mariner he enlists Ensign Sam Rutherford's aid in stopping the macrovirus. On the Cerritos, a stray Delta Quadrant flower petal causes a transporter accident that merges Dr. T'Ana and chief engineer Andy Billups into one person, "T'illups". Captain Carol Freeman learns that when this happened on Voyager, Captain Kathryn Janeway killed the merged person, Tuvix, to restore the original individuals. Not wanting to suffer the same fate, T'illups begins "Tuvixing" other crew members. Ensigns D'Vana Tendi and T'Lyn merge all the Tuvixed individuals into a huge ball of flesh before separating them. After the chaos, Boimler, Tendi, T'Lyn, and Mariner all receive promotions to lieutenant (junior grade). Meanwhile, the Klingon ship Che'Ta is attacked by an unknown vessel.
32	2	"I Have No Bones Yet I Must Flee"	Megan Lloyd	Aaron Burdette	September 7, 2023
A Romulan starship is attacked by the same unknown vessel. Mariner thinks Ransom is planning to demote her to ensign again and resolves to act insubordinately to speed this up. On a mission to rescue humans from an alien menagerie, Mariner's behavior is irreverent and undisciplined. When a dangerous, bone-drinking creature called Moopsy escapes from its cage, Ransom accuses Mariner of releasing it in order to get demoted, but tells her that he has faith in her and refuses to let her sabotage her own career. The two work together to return Moopsy to its cage, and discover that the humans in the menagerie freed Moopsy themselves. Rutherford is anxious that Tendi's promotion will ruin their friendship. He spends the day trying to impress Billups with his engineering skills in order to earn his own promotion, only to be outdone at every turn by the new Ensign Livik. Tendi assures Rutherford that they will remain friends no matter what. Learning that Rutherford has turned down promotions in the past, Tendi asks Billups to give him the promotion he is due and Billups agrees to promote Rutherford instead of Livik.
33	3	"In the Cradle of Vexilon"	Brandon Williams	Ben Waller	September 14, 2023
The Cerritos visits Corazonia, an idyllic space habitat controlled by an ancient computer system named Vexilon whose performance is deteriorating. Freeman's attempts to repair Vexilon cause it to shut down, creating chaos in Corazonia's ecosystem. At the same time, Boimler leads his first away mission to decommission a power plant and insists on doing all the work himself. When Freeman needs the plant to be reactivated, T'Lyn persuades Boimler to trust his ensigns and they work together to restart it. This allows Freeman to reset Vexilon, which causes the plant to explode and kill Boimler. He is later revived by Dr. T'Ana. On the Cerritos, Lieutenant Dirk tasks Mariner, Tendi, and Rutherford with scanning thousands of computer chips to find one broken one. Suspecting he is hazing them, they retaliate by planting a game of Chula, which traps players in a simulated world, in his quarters. When Dirk reveals that he was traumatized by Chula as a child, Mariner distracts him so Rutherford can remove the game from his quarters while Tendi finds the broken chip. Dirk and Ransom later celebrate the successful hazing.
34	4	"Something Borrowed, Something Green"	Bob Suarez	Grace Parra Janney	September 21, 2023
After an Orion supply ship is assaulted by the unknown vessel, Starfleet pressures D'Vana into attending her sister D'Erika's wedding to demonstrate interstellar goodwill. Mariner and T'Lyn accompany D'Vana to Orion, where the Tendi family is one of the most rich, powerful, and feared on the planet. The bride has been kidnapped, and it is D'Vana's customary responsibility to rescue her. They track D'Erika to an abandoned spaceship yard, where D'Vana confesses that she was trained to be an elite assassin before running away to join Starfleet. D'Erika ambushes D'Vana in revenge for abandoning her. The sisters reconcile and the wedding occurs as planned. On the Cerritos, Boimler and Rutherford become roommates. They soon begin having arguments which they resolve by both dressing and acting as Mark Twain on the holodeck. When Freeman struggles to negotiate with an aggressive Chalnoth captain, Boimler and Rutherford suggest they also dress and act as Mark Twain. This leads to a brawl, but the Chalnoth calms and proceeds with negotiations after eating Boimler and Rutherford's bonsai tree.
35	5	"Empathological Fallacies"	Megan Lloyd	Jamie Loftus	September 28, 2023
The Cerritos escorts three Betazoid diplomats. Disliking her time on the ship, T'Lyn drafts a request to return to her former ship, the Sh'vhal. The Cerritos crew begin behaving in an unhinged manner, and Freeman suspects the Betazoids have Zanthi fever, a telepathic disease that affects others' emotions. The Betazoids object to Freeman's treatment of them, reveal themselves to be undercover intelligence officers, and seize control of the ship. T'Lyn realizes that her conflicting emotions over her transfer to Starfleet are being telepathically projected to the crew and feels she has failed as a Vulcan. Mariner helps restore her self-confidence, quelling T'Lyn's emotions and returning the crew to normal. She decides to remain on the Cerritos. Meanwhile, an overworked Boimler wants to train with the ship's security team and is frustrated when they just play games. He later witnesses the security team easily handling the Betazoid threat, and Shaxs says they are well-trained and just wanted to help Boimler relax. Before leaving, the Betazoids share an image of the mysterious vessel that has been attacking ships.
36	6	"Parth Ferengi's Heart Place"	Brandon Williams	Cullen Crawford	October 5, 2023
A Ferengi ship is attacked by the mysterious vessel, which was planned by a low-ranking member of its own crew. Freeman is tasked with aiding a Starfleet admiral with formalizing the agreement for the Ferengi to join the Federation, but she is ignored when she realizes that the Ferengi Grand Nagus Rom and First Clerk Leeta are scamming them by asking for additional terms that the admiral agrees to. Freeman attempts to scam them back and earns the respect of Rom and Leeta, who agree to the Federation's original terms. During these negotiations, Ransom assigns the lieutenants to travel guide duty so they can enjoy some time exploring the planet Ferenginar. Mariner meets with a friend, Quimp. Irritated by Ransom's continued support of her, she gets drunk and causes senseless fights until Quimp calls her out for not accepting that her career is in a good place for once. Boimler plans an ambitious sightseeing agenda, but ends up binge-watching Ferengi television the whole time. Tendi and Rutherford are asked to pose as a married couple as part of their assignment and find the experience awkward.
37	7	"A Few Badgeys More"	Bob Suarez	Edgar Momplaisir	October 12, 2023
A Drookmani scavenger ship is taken over by Rutherford's rogue artificial intelligence Badgey. Answering a distress call from a Bynar ship that was attacked by the mysterious vessel, the Cerritos finds the scavenger ship and is attacked by Badgey. Rutherford and Mariner transport to the scavenger ship and talk to Badgey. Cognitive dissonance causes Badgey to split his positive feelings for Rutherford into a separate entity, "Goodgey". Badgey attempts to destroy all Federation ships, but this process gives him omniscience and he apologizes for his behavior before ascending to a higher state of being. Rutherford incorporates Goodgey into a Federation guidance system. Meanwhile, Tendi and Boimler go to the Daystrom Institute for Advanced Robotics where the rogue Exocomp Peanut Hamper and malevolent computer AGIMUS are being rehabilitated. The pair plot their escape, but Peanut Hamper abandons AGIMUS because she has actually reformed. AGIMUS resolves to truly reform as well so he can join her, and gives intel to Boimler showing that the attacked ships have been stolen, not destroyed.
38	8	"Caves"	Megan Lloyd	Ben Rodgers	October 19, 2023
Boimler, Mariner, Tendi, and Rutherford are trapped in a collapsed cave while on an away mission to study aggressively growing moss. With communications blocked, they recount tales of previous experiences trapped in caves: Boimler was trapped with conspiracy theorist Lieutenant Levy on Kyron 4, but bonded with him when his theory that they were being tested by Vendorians proved correct; Rutherford was trapped with Dr. T'ana on Balkus 9 and gave birth to an alien baby that he and T'ana raised together while searching for an exit; Mariner was trapped with Delta Shift on Glish and was able to work with them, despite initial animosity, to signal for help. Worried that their stories show that their friend group is changing, the four begin arguing. The moss reveals itself to be sentient and demands to hear Tendi's story: on Tendi's first day, all four were trapped in a lift and became friends. Tendi assures them that they will always be friends, even if their social circles grow. The moss is touched and they continue recounting stories, not knowing that the blocked communications are another Vendorian test.
39	9	"The Inner Fight"	Brandon Williams	Mike McMahan	October 26, 2023
The mysterious vessel begins targeting former Starfleet officers and the Cerritos is assigned to locate and protect former cadet Nick Locarno. Mariner, whose destructive behavior concerns Freeman, is assigned to a simple repair job near Sherbal V with Tendi, T'Lyn, and Boimler. The Che'Ta destroys their shuttle and they transport to the planet, where they find the senior officers of the missing ships stranded as victims of mutiny: their lower decks officers all planned the attacks with the mysterious vessel. Mariner fights with Che'Ta captain Ma'ah until they are forced to take shelter from a storm. Mariner reveals that she lost a friend, Sito Jaxa, to a Starfleet spy mission (Note: As depicted in the Star Trek: The Next Generation episode "Lower Decks") and has been acting out over concerns about her new role within Starfleet. Ma'ah helps bolster Mariner's belief in herself and Starfleet. She convinces the stranded captains to work together, but is suddenly transported away. Ma'ah and the others lure the Che'Ta to the surface and overtake it. At Locarno's residence, Freeman discovers schematics for the mysterious vessel; Mariner finds herself aboard the vessel and is greeted by Locarno.
40	10	"Old Friends, New Planets"	Bob Suarez	May Darmon	November 2, 2023
Locarno broadcasts a message to explain that he has formed a new fleet with the mutinous crews and threatens to use a Genesis Device if their legitimacy is not recognized. Locarno kidnapped Mariner believing that she would join him because of her own issues with Starfleet, but she instead warns viewers not to trust Locarno, steals the device, and attempts to escape in a ship. Freeman defies Starfleet orders and goes to rescue Mariner with an inoperable battleship, provided by D'Erika on the condition that D'Vana return to Orion. Boimler, serving as acting captain, uses the Cerritos's tractor beam to crash the battleship into Locarno's shields and allow Freeman to enter. Mariner sets the device to activate and pleads with Locarno not to let his anger over his expulsion from Starfleet (Note: As depicted in the Star Trek: The Next Generation episode "The First Duty") dictate his life. He refuses and Freeman transports Mariner away. Locarno fails to deactivate the device, which creates a new planet from him and the surrounding matter that Starfleet names "Locarno". Mariner admits her struggles to her friends, T'Lyn declines an invitation to return to the Sh'vhal, and D'Vana returns to Orion.

== Cast and characters ==
=== Main ===
- Tawny Newsome as Beckett Mariner
- Jack Quaid as Brad Boimler
- Noël Wells as D'Vana Tendi
- Eugene Cordero as Sam Rutherford
- Dawnn Lewis as Carol Freeman
- Jerry O'Connell as Jack Ransom
- Fred Tatasciore as Shaxs
- Gillian Vigman as T'Ana

=== Recurring ===
- Jon Curry as Ma'ah
- Nolan North as Livik
- Gabrielle Ruiz as T'Lyn
- Paul Scheer as Andy Billups
- Carl Tart as Kayshon
- Paul F. Tompkins as Migleemo and Vrek
- Kari Wahlgren as Key'lor and Cosmia
- Eric Bauza as Gem and Jeef
- Ariel Winter as D'Erika Tendi
- Jessica McKenna as Barnes
- Robert Duncan McNeill as Nick Locarno

=== Notable guests ===
- James Sie as Dr. Chaotica
- Phil LaMarr as Alonzo Freeman
- Max Grodénchik as Rom
- Chase Masterson as Leeta
- Jeffrey Combs as AGIMUS
- Kether Donohue as Peanut Hamper
- Jack McBrayer as Badgey / Goodgey / Logic-y
- Shannon Fill as Sito Jaxa
- Wil Wheaton as Wesley Crusher

== Production ==
=== Development and writing ===
Paramount+ ordered a 10-episode fourth season of Star Trek: Lower Decks in January 2022, when it also announced season renewals for the other Star Trek Universe series. Writing for the season began by that April, and was mostly completed by September.

After the success of the second-season episode "wej Duj", which had a different format than previous episodes of the series, McMahan said the writers were trying to bring those types of ideas to the whole fourth season. He later said the season would have an episode that continued from the third-season episode "A Mathematically Perfect Redemption", in which the narcissistic exocomp Peanut Hamper met the evil computer AGIMUS, but said there would not be a standalone Peanut Hamper episode in the season like that episode was. McMahan added that there would be an episode set on the planet Orion, a romantic episode, and a wedding.

=== Casting and voice recording ===
The series stars a group of ensigns that serve in the lower decks of the Cerritos: Tawny Newsome as Beckett Mariner, Jack Quaid as Brad Boimler, Noël Wells as D'Vana Tendi, and Eugene Cordero as Sam Rutherford. The ship's bridge crew, who have supporting roles, include Dawnn Lewis as Captain Carol Freeman, Jerry O'Connell as first officer Commander Jack Ransom, Fred Tatasciore as security chief Lieutenant Shaxs, and Gillian Vigman as chief medical officer Dr. T'Ana. Newsome had begun recording voice overs for the season by June 2022, when she was also doing additional dialogue recording (ADR) for the third season.

McMahan did not anticipate the positive fan reaction to second-season guest star Gabrielle Ruiz's T'Lyn when working on the third season, so she only has a small role there, but he hoped to explore her further in future seasons; he later described the fourth season as going "to T'Lyn town. I want to know what she's up to." T'Lyn is a "provisional ensign" aboard the Cerritos in the fourth season.

=== Animation and design ===
Independent animation studio Titmouse provides the animation for the series, with Barry J. Kelly serving as supervising director. The art team was about to begin work in mid-July 2022, and animation was nearly complete in September 2023. The animation style reflects the look of "prime time animated comedy" series such as The Simpsons, but with more detailed backgrounds and environments than is traditional for prime time animation.

Despite Orions being introduced to Star Trek more than 50 years earlier, this season is the first time that the planet Orion is seen on screen. Art director Nollan Obena's approach to desiging planet locations for the series was to have diverse locations on each planet, just as different regions on Earth look different. For Orion, these different locations range from farmland to a city inspired by the film Blade Runner (1982). Though Orions are traditionally associated with pirate culture, Kelly did not want their homes on Orion to continue that theme because "pirates and drug lords get pretty snazzy homes. They live on island resorts that do not look like a pirate ship".

== Marketing ==
A trailer and the key art poster for the season were revealed at San Diego Comic-Con in July 2023, when the season's premiere date was also announced. The poster continues the series' theme of referencing the posters of the Star Trek films, with this one being an homage to the Star Trek IV: The Voyage Home (1986) poster. Commentators highlighted the potential promotions that the trailer teased for the series' main characters as well as the arrival of T'Lyn on the Cerritos. Another trailer and poster were released in August, and commentators highlighted the reveal that the series' main characters would be visiting the USS Voyager in the season. The episode "Caves" was screened at a Star Trek Universe panel at New York Comic Con in October 2023, before its release on Paramount+. This was followed by a discussion about the season with McMahan.

As with the previous seasons, animation studio Titmouse released a shirt with a unique design on it alongside each episode. The designs were available for one week each, and fans who bought all ten received a bonus eleventh shirt. Mondo and EXO-6 announced the availability of new Mariner, Boimler, and Badgey figurines to coincide with the season's release, and Funko announced Funko Pop figurines of Mariner, Boimler, Tendi, Rutherford, and Badgey with the release of the season finale. By that time, Hallmark released Badgey Christmas ornaments as part of their 2023 line of Star Trek ornaments, and the creature Moopsy from the season's second episode was added to the Star Trek: Lower Decks – The Badgey Directive mobile game. In March 2024, Master Replicas announced a Moopsy plush toy would be released later in the year. Responding to the fan enthusiasm for Moopsy which led to this merchandise, McMahan said the writers did not know audiences would respond that way but he understood why they were drawn to a creature that was adorable, with a child's voice, but also scary.

== Release ==
=== Streaming and broadcast ===
The season premiered on Paramount+ in the United States and Latin America on September 7, 2023, with its first two episodes. The rest of its 10-episode run was released weekly. Each episode was broadcast in Canada on the CTV Sci-Fi Channel, and made available on Paramount+ in the UK, Australia, Italy, France, Germany, Austria, Switzerland, and South Korea later in 2023. The season was made available for free in the U.S. for a limited time on YouTube and Pluto TV in October 2024, three weeks before the premiere of the fifth season.

=== Home media ===
The season was released for purchase on digital platforms on February 5, 2024, and it was released on DVD and Blu-Ray in the U.S. on April 16, 2024. The physical release includes behind-the-scenes featurettes for the finale and the season as a whole, as well as audio commentaries with cast and crew for several of the episodes.

== Reception ==
=== Critical response ===
Rotten Tomatoes reported 100% approval with an average rating of 8.80/10 based on 18 reviews. The website's critical consensus reads, "Mirthful as ever while having grown into a proper Star Trek serial in its own right, Lower Decks' fourth season swabs the series' formula into a pristine polish." Metacritic, which uses a weighted average, assigned a score of 83 out of 100 based on reviews from 6 critics, indicating "universal acclaim".

=== Accolades ===
Accolades received by Star Trek: Lower Decks season 3
Year	Award	Category	Nominee(s)	Result	Ref.
2024	Critics' Choice Television Awards	Best Animated Series	Star Trek: Lower Decks	Nominated	
2024	Golden Reel Awards	Outstanding Achievement in Sound Editing – Broadcast Animation	James Lucero, Mak Kellerman, John Wynn, and Michael Britt (for "Old Friends, New Planets")	Nominated	
2024	Primetime Creative Arts Emmy Awards	Outstanding Sound Editing for a Comedy or Drama Series (Half-Hour) and Animation	James Lucero, Drew Guy, Mak Kellerman, John Wynn, and Michael Britt (for "The Inner Fight")	Nominated	
2024	Saturn Awards	Best Animated Television Series or Special	Star Trek: Lower Decks	Nominated	
2024	Tell-Tale TV Awards	Favorite Animated Series	Star Trek: Lower Decks	Won	
