= Star Trek: Lower Decks season 1 =

Star Trek: Lower Decks
- Season 1
- Promotional poster with art by Matt Ferguson, parodying a poster for the film Star Trek: The Motion Picture (1979) by Bob Peak
- Showrunner: Mike McMahan
- Starring: Tawny Newsome; Jack Quaid; Noël Wells; Eugene Cordero; Dawnn Lewis; Jerry O'Connell; Fred Tatasciore; Gillian Vigman
- No. of episodes: 10

Release
- Original network: CBS All Access
- Original release: August 6 – October 8, 2020

Season chronology
- Next → Season 2

The first season of the American adult animated television series Star Trek: Lower Decks is set in the 24th century and follows the adventures of the low-ranking officers with menial jobs on the starship Cerritos, one of Starfleet's least important starships. The season was produced by CBS Eye Animation Productions in association with Secret Hideout, Important Science, Roddenberry Entertainment, and animation studio Titmouse, with Mike McMahan serving as showrunner and Juno Lee as supervising director.

Tawny Newsome, Jack Quaid, Noël Wells, and Eugene Cordero voice the lower decks crew members of the Cerritos, with Dawnn Lewis, Jerry O'Connell, Fred Tatasciore, and Gillian Vigman providing voices for the ship's senior officers. Lower Decks was ordered in October 2018 with McMahan on board as showrunner. The series is a comedy, but the writers did not want to stray too far from the rest of the Star Trek franchise and used similar premises to classic Star Trek: The Next Generation stories for many episodes. Titmouse began work on the animation by February 2019, and the main cast was announced that July. Production, including voice recording, shifted to taking place remotely in March 2020 due to the COVID-19 pandemic. The season features many connections and references to past Star Trek media, including several actors returning as guest stars.

The season premiered on the streaming service CBS All Access on August 6, 2020, and ran for 10 episodes until October 10. It was initially met with mixed responses from critics for its humor and large number of Star Trek references, but reviews for the animation, Newsome's performance, and later episodes were more positive. The season received a Primetime Creative Arts Emmy Award nomination for its sound editing and several other awards and nominations. A second season was ordered at the same time as the first in October 2018.

== Episodes ==
Star Trek: Lower Decks season 1 episodes
No. overall	No. in season	Title	Directed by	Written by	Original release date
1	1	"Second Contact"	Barry J. Kelly	Mike McMahan	August 6, 2020
Ensign D'Vana Tendi arrives on the USS Cerritos and is given a tour by ensigns Brad Boimler and Beckett Mariner. Boimler is asked by Captain Carol Freeman to report any breaches of protocol made by the rebellious Mariner. On a mission, Boimler catches Mariner giving equipment to local farmers. The pair are attacked by a farm animal which destroys Boimler's uniform and covers him in slime. Meanwhile, commander Jack Ransom unknowingly carries an alien virus from the planet surface to the Cerritos and it quickly infects much of the crew, causing violent behavior. Ensign Sam Rutherford is on a date with Ensign Barnes when this happens. They fight off infected crew members together, but Rutherford loses interest in Barnes because she does not care about the ship's mechanics. Chief medical officer T'Ana uses the slime on Boimler to synthesize an antidote for the virus and is praised by Freeman. Boimler chooses not to report Mariner to Freeman, who is secretly Mariner's mother and was looking for a reason to have Mariner removed from the ship. Mariner offers to help mentor Boimler.
2	2	"Envoys"	Kim Arndt	Chris Kula	August 13, 2020
Boimler is assigned to a mission to transport Klingon general K'orin to the United Federation of Planets Embassy on Tulgana IV. Mariner has herself assigned to the same mission, revealing that she is old friends with K'orin. The pair drink and reminisce while Boimler flies them to the planet. After they land, a drunken K'orin steals the shuttlecraft. While tracking down K'orin, Boimler feels he is unprepared for field work compared to Mariner, and threatens to quit Starfleet. They are offered assistance by a Ferengi who Mariner believes is trustworthy, but Boimler cautions against this and is proven correct when the Ferengi pulls a knife on them. Boimler scares the Ferengi away. The pair find K'orin and leave him at the embassy before returning to the Cerritos. Boimler teases Mariner about how he was the one to defeat the Ferengi, unaware that Mariner had staged the incident. Meanwhile, Rutherford transfers from engineering to other divisions hoping to have more time to spend with Tendi. He decides that engineering is where he wants to be, and she chooses to spend time with him while he works.
3	3	"Temporal Edict"	Bob Suarez	Dave Ihlenfeld & David Wright	August 20, 2020
The Cerritos is en route to Cardassia Prime for peace negotiations when it is re-assigned to instead deliver "diplomatic trinkets" to Gelrak V. This angers Freeman, who believes the Cerritos is not respected by Starfleet. The ensigns teach Tendi about "buffer time", a long-standing tradition in which the lower-decks crew take time to relax between jobs. Boimler accidentally reveals this to Freeman, who institutes a time deadline for all tasks. The ship descends into chaos as the crew attempts to complete their work on time, and this confusion causes the away team to take the wrong gift to Gelrak V. Offended by this, the people of Gelrak V attack the Cerritos. The crew is unable to respond until Boimler reminds Freeman that they need to be able to complete work in their own time. She cancels the time deadlines and the crew are able to focus on repelling the attackers. Freeman later institutes a new mandate called "The Boimler Effect", encouraging crew members to take shortcuts, not blindly follow the rules, and build in "buffer time" whenever they deem fit, much to the chagrin of the by-the-book Boimler.
4	4	"Moist Vessel"	Barry J. Kelly	Ann Kim	August 27, 2020
The Cerritos joins a joint mission with the USS Merced to tow a disabled generation ship. The ship carries alien xenoforming material that converts inert matter to organic matter. Freeman gives Mariner the most disliked jobs in an effort to force her to transfer to another ship, but Mariner finds ways to make these tasks enjoyable. Freeman then promotes Mariner to lieutenant, hoping that Mariner will be bored by the increased responsibility and decide to transfer. During the mission, the xenoforming material cripples the Merced and begins xenoforming the Cerritos. Mariner works with Freeman to escape the xenoforming, return the ship to its previous state, and rescue the crew of the Merced. Meanwhile, Tendi's clumsiness prevents Lieutenant O'Connor's spiritual ascension and she pesters him to try apologize. Despite this, O'Connor nearly sacrifices himself to save Tendi's life during the xenoforming disaster. This act causes him to achieve spiritual ascension and see a vision of a koala, though it appears to be a painful process. Mariner is later demoted back to ensign for making fun of an admiral.
5	5	"Cupid's Errant Arrow"	Kim Arndt	Ben Joseph	September 3, 2020
The Cerritos provides support to the USS Vancouver in the controlled demolition of an unstable moon. Boimler introduces his girlfriend Barbara—a Vancouver crew member—to Mariner, who doubts that Barbara is sincerely interested in Boimler and becomes obsessed with proving her hypothesis. Freeman deals with the alien politics involved before the demolition can be completed. Rutherford and Tendi are excited to tour the Vancouver with its state-of-the-art technology. They meet Lt. Commander Docent, who demands to transfer one of them to the Vancouver against their wishes after a brief competitive exercise. This results in a scuffle. Docent later admits that he cannot handle the exciting and epic adventures on board the Vancouver and was hoping to swap with one of the Cerritos officers to be on a more boring ship. Mariner discovers that Barbara is under the influence of an alien parasite that is attached to Boimler, which she removes. Without the parasite, Barbara leaves Boimler while Mariner and Barbara find they have much in common and become friends.
6	6	"Terminal Provocations"	Bob Suarez	John Cochran	September 10, 2020
The Cerritos finds itself in a standoff with the Drookmani over the salvage of an old Starfleet ship. Mariner and Boimler's friend, Ensign Fletcher, offers to recalibrate the ship's isolinear cores for them so the two can leave work early to attend a concert. They return to find him the victim of an attack and the shield core missing. Rutherford shows off his new holographic assistant to Tendi in the holodeck: an anthropomorphic Starfleet badge named Badgey. The Drookmani attack the Cerritos, which is without shields due to the missing core, causing a holodeck malfunction that results in Badgey becoming homicidal. Badgey attacks Rutherford and Tendi, who defeat him by changing the holodeck program to a tundra which freezes Badgey. Boimler and Mariner discover that Fletcher staged the attack because he was unable to complete the work. The missing core goes on a rampage before being blown out of an airlock. It drifts to the Drookmani ship and disables it, stopping their attack. Fletcher is rewarded for stopping the Drookmani with a transfer to the USS Titan, where he is fired a week later.
7	7	"Much Ado About Boimler"	Barry J. Kelly	M. Willis	September 17, 2020
Boimler volunteers to test Rutherford's new transporter upgrade, which malfunctions and leaves him "phasing" between states of materialization. Tendi genetically engineers a dog with an array of freakish abilities. Boimler and the dog are sent to "The Farm", a Starfleet medical base for unusual conditions, on the USS Osler. Freeman is assigned to a covert mission and Mariner's old friend Captain Amina Ramsey takes temporary command. To avoid being promoted by Ramsey, Mariner displays uncharacteristic incompetence but is forced to confidently take control when the Cerritos finds the USS Rubidoux being torn apart by a hatching space-born entity. Other patients on the Osler fear the Farm is a horrible place and stage a mutiny. Boimler recovers from the phasing and attempts to make peace. As the other patients are about to blow him out of an airlock, they arrive at the Farm and discover it to be a real, luxurious medical spa planet whose inhabitants receive the best care. Boimler tries to stay but is sent back to the Cerritos since he is cured. Ramsey parts amicably with Mariner.
8	8	"Veritas"	Kim Arndt	Garrick Bernard	September 24, 2020
Mariner, Boimler, Tendi, and Rutherford are brought before a court by an alien named Clar, who demands they testify about the actions of the Cerritos's senior crew. Mariner relates a story about a mishandled standoff with the insectoid Clickets, who are aggravated by Mariner misunderstanding Freeman's orders. Rutherford recalls a high-stakes mission stealing a Romulan Bird of Prey starship from a Vulcan starship museum, but he has gaps in his memory due to his cybernetic implant. Tendi testifies about mistakenly joining a covert mission on the Bird of Prey to the planet Romulus to steal an unknown package. Clar doubts their accounts and confusion, believing Starfleet officers should know what is happening on their ship, but Boimler assures him that Starfleet crew members often make mistakes—including antics with the being Q or boarding the wrong vessel—and accuses Clar of holding a drumhead trial. Clar clarifies that this is a party celebrating his rescue from Romulus by the Cerritos, and he was just seeking an account of those events. The ensigns later ignore another encounter with Q.
9	9	"Crisis Point"	Bob Suarez	Ben Rodgers	October 1, 2020
To help him prepare for an interview with Freeman, Boimler creates a holodeck program using the crew's private logs to produce an accurate simulation of the Cerritos and its crew. Because of Mariner's recent behavior, Freeman sends her—against her will—to the ship's therapist, Dr. Migleemo. Mariner insists that she is fine. Later, she spitefully takes over Boimler's program to create a movie-like experience where she plays the villainous Vindicta. Mariner invades the simulation of the Cerritos and kills the crew. Boimler and Rutherford join the holographic crew to fight against Vindicta, while Tendi leaves the simulation after being disturbed by Mariner's behavior. Mariner ultimately crashes the simulation of the Cerritos and then fights a holographic recreation of herself, causing her to realize her true feelings for her mother and Starfleet. Concluding that this "therapy" has worked, she leaves the holodeck. Boimler completes the simulation and accidentally discovers that Freeman is Mariner's mother. In the interview with the captain, Boimler fails due to panicking about his knowledge of their relationship.
10	10	"No Small Parts"	Barry J. Kelly	Mike McMahan	October 8, 2020
Boimler inadvertently reveals to the crew that Mariner is Freeman's daughter. The Cerritos picks up new crew members, including an Exocomp—a sentient robot—named Peanut Hamper. They receive a distress call from the USS Solvang and find it destroyed by the Pakleds, a group of unintelligent aliens who have become a threat while being ignored by Starfleet. They begin tearing apart the Cerritos. Rutherford plans to disable the Pakled ship using a computer virus developed by Badgey. Peanut Hamper refuses to deliver the virus, forcing Lieutenant Shaxs and Rutherford to fly a shuttle to the Pakled ship. Badgey uploads the virus but also engages the ship's self-destruct in an attempt to kill Rutherford. Shaxs takes Rutherford's cybernetic implant and sacrifices himself to help Rutherford escape; Rutherford loses his long-term memory. When more Pakled ships arrive, the Cerritos is saved by the USS Titan, captained by William Riker. A funeral is held for Shaxs. Freeman makes peace with Mariner and proposes they work together to bend Starfleet regulations. Boimler accepts a promotion to the Titan.

== Cast and characters ==
=== Main ===
- Tawny Newsome as Beckett Mariner
- Jack Quaid as Brad Boimler
- Noël Wells as D'Vana Tendi
- Eugene Cordero as Sam Rutherford
- Dawnn Lewis as Carol Freeman
- Jerry O'Connell as Jack Ransom
- Fred Tatasciore as Shaxs
- Gillian Vigman as T'Ana

=== Recurring ===
- Jessica McKenna as Barnes
- Ben Rodgers as Stevens
- Paul Scheer as Andy Billups
- Sam Richardson as Vendome
- Marcus Henderson as Jet Manhaver
- Tim Robinson as Fletcher
- Jack McBrayer as Badgey
- Lauren Lapkus as Jennifer

=== Notable guests ===
- J.G. Hertzler as Drookmani captain
- John de Lancie as Q
- Kurtwood Smith as Clar
- Kenneth Mitchell as Seartave
- Jonathan Frakes as William Riker
- Marina Sirtis as Deanna Troi

== Production ==
=== Development ===
CBS All Access officially ordered two seasons of Star Trek: Lower Decks, a new animated series, in October 2018. Mike McMahan was set as showrunner for the series, and announced in July 2019 that the first season would consist of 10 episodes and be released in 2020. Executive producer Heather Kadin said in January 2020 that the season would be ready by May 2020, but would be scheduled for release around the other Star Trek series that were being produced for All Access. By late March, work on the season was taking place remotely due to the COVID-19 pandemic forcing staff to work from home. McMahan said that, at the time, delivery of the series had not been affected by the pandemic. It took around a day for everyone working on the series to be set-up to work from home. In July, CBS All Access officially scheduled the season to premiere in August 2020.

=== Writing ===
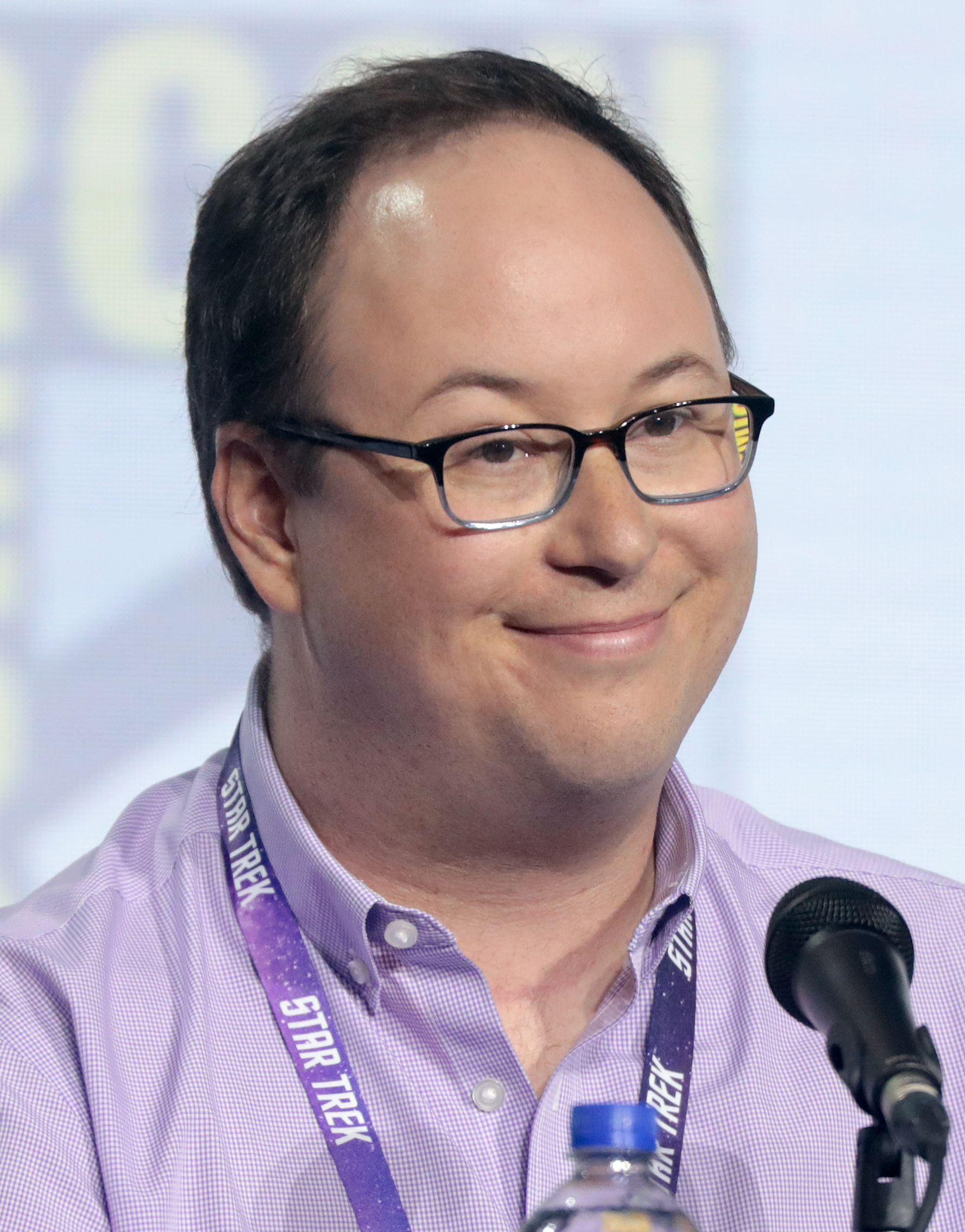
Creator and showrunner Mike McMahan

The series is set in 2380, one year after the film Star Trek: Nemesis (2002), and focuses on the support crew of the USS Cerritos rather than the main bridge crew that would usually be the focus of a Star Trek series. The writers began by discussing the main characters in the lower decks of the Cerritos, to determine what emotional stories and character arcs they wanted for each episode. They then came up with science fiction ideas that aligned with those arcs. McMahan felt the writers were attempting to "figur[e] out what the show was" for much of the season.

McMahan said the season was "playing the hits" of the series Star Trek: The Next Generation, adding: "Let's do our trial episode. Let's do our version of a movie. Let's do a plague on the ship. Let's do all these things that [feel familiar]". Though Lower Decks is a comedy, he did not want it to be about "punching down on Trek" and focused on telling Star Trek stories with characters who happen to be funny. The writers looked to previous Star Trek series to find similar characters and situations to what they were proposing for Lower Decks, to ensure that their comedic storylines were not straying too far from the franchise. The character Badgey began as a sketch of a Starfleet badge by McMahan that he felt could be similar to the hologram of Professor Moriarty from The Next Generation. The writers discussed what purpose Moriarty served in that series and how they could apply those ideas to Badgey in Lower Decks. Similarly, the character of Ensign Fletcher was created in relation to the Next Generation and Star Trek: Voyager character Reginald Barclay. McMahan said Barclay begins his journey as a bad Starfleet officer but is able to improve and "find his path" with the support of others, while Fletcher is a darker version of Barclay who is not able to improve with support and is ultimately fired by Starfleet for his incompetence.

Late in the season, McMahan felt they needed to explore the bridge crew more in order to tell better stories. This included Captain Freeman, who is revealed to be the mother of main character Beckett Mariner. McMahan based this relationship on that of his own mother and sister; his sister was the namesake for Mariner. They try to keep their relationship a secret but it becomes public knowledge in the season finale. McMahan described the penultimate episode, "Crisis Point", as a classic Marvel Cinematic Universe-style story with a lot of film tropes and homages to the Star Trek films. He also described it as being a parody of the Star Trek films, as well as a "big character therapy episode" that lets both the audience and Mariner see the relationship with her mother play out visually. The episode ends with an emotional breakthrough for Mariner that allows her to work with her mother in the season finale, setting up a new dynamic for the pair in the second season. McMahan said it was difficult to pitch the episode to executives, a problem that he also had with the episode "Veritas" which was inspired by his childhood memories of tuning into Star Trek episodes late and not understanding the context.

The season is filled with many references to other Star Trek series, which McMahan described as "texture and details that we love". There are also non-Star Trek Easter eggs, such as the registry number for the Cerritos being based on McMahan's mother's phone number. "Temporal Edict" ends with a statue of Miles O'Brien from The Next Generation and Star Trek: Deep Space Nine who McMahan said was the most important Star Trek character, explaining that O'Brien is "the original lower decker, moving from an enlisted crewman all the way to professor of engineering at Starfleet Academy... those of us who spent years watching him grow across two television series know he is, without a doubt, the most important person in Starfleet history". An element that McMahan enjoyed was being able to revisit aliens and locations from standalone episodes of previous Star Trek series, which was a way to bring back elements from earlier in the franchise without impacting on the existing Star Trek canon. This led to the writers featuring the Pakleds as the "big bads" in the season finale. The Pakleds were introduced in the Next Generation episode "Samaritan Snare" and "used to be sort of a joke", according to McMahan, but are shown in the finale of Lower Decks to have secretly amassed power and become a threat to Starfleet. McMahan saw this as a way to address the modern rise of neo-nationalist groups, saying the Pakleds, like those groups, "got too powerful, and now they are actually dangerous and people are paying with their lives for not taking them seriously".

=== Casting and voice recording ===
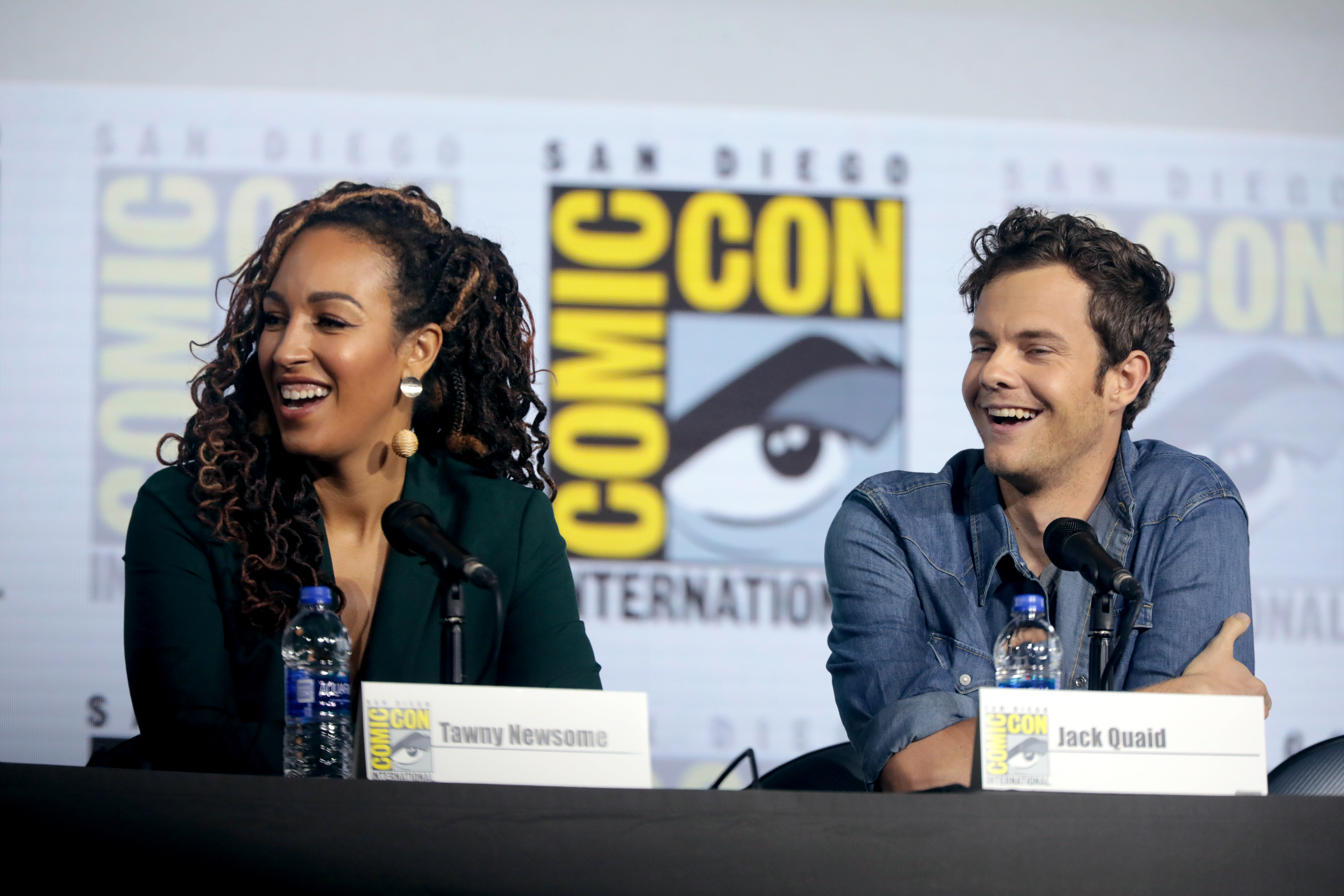
Tawny Newsome and Jack Quaid respectively star as two of the series' central lower decks officers, Beckett Mariner and Brad Boimler.

McMahan announced the series' main cast in July 2019, led by ensigns that serve in the lower decks of the Cerritos: Tawny Newsome as Beckett Mariner, Jack Quaid as Brad Boimler, Noël Wells as D'Vana Tendi, and Eugene Cordero as Sam Rutherford. The ship's bridge crew, who have supporting roles, include Dawnn Lewis as Captain Carol Freeman, Jerry O'Connell as first officer Commander Jack Ransom, Fred Tatasciore as security chief Lieutenant Shaxs, and Gillian Vigman as chief medical officer Dr. T'Ana.

In August 2019, McMahan said there was potential for members of the Next Generation cast to make cameo appearances in the series since those characters are in the Star Trek universe at the time that Lower Decks is set, but he did not want this to be in a way that would "mess up the show". He wanted to include William Riker, and had previously met actor Jonathan Frakes while working in Toronto on the shorts series Star Trek: Short Treks when Frakes was also there working on Star Trek: Discovery. Frakes was open to reprising his role in Lower Decks, and McMahan thought it would be natural to have Riker appear if the Cerritos needed help from the USS Titan, so that was written into the season finale. He also felt that they could not feature Riker without Deanna Troi also appearing. Marina Sirtis reprised her role as Troi from The Next Generation. McMahan described Riker in Lower Decks as an "enhanced" version of the character, and encouraged Frakes to let him be a "wild, insane character", which Frakes had wanted to do with Riker for years. John de Lancie also reprises his Next Generation role of Q. Additionally, some previous Star Trek actors play new characters, including J.G. Hertzler as a Drookmani captain, Kurtwood Smith as Clar, and Kenneth Mitchell as Seartave.

In June 2020, Newsome was asked by a fan on Twitter if comedian Paul F. Tompkins would have a guest role in the series given Newsome was a frequent guest on Tompkins' podcast Spontaneanation. Tompkins expressed interest in the idea, and McMahan responded to say that he was organizing to have Tompkins cast for a guest role in the series' second season; Tompkins ultimately voiced Dr. Migleemo, Mariner's therapist, in the first season. In July, Paul Scheer was revealed to have a recurring guest role as chief engineer Andy Billups. Other recurring characters in the season include Jessica McKenna as Ensign Barnes and the Cerritos computer, writer Ben Rodgers as Lieutenant Steve Stevens, Sam Richardson as Ensign Vendome, Marcus Henderson as Lieutenant Jet Manhaver, Tim Robinson as Ensign Fletcher, Jack McBrayer as Badgey, and Lauren Lapkus as Ensign Jennifer. The latter is an Andorian, which Newsome did not realize when she improvised the uncharacteristically human name "Jennifer" during recording.

Quaid and Newsome recorded their lines together with McMahan for most of the first season, until the pandemic forced all further recording, including additional dialogue recording (ADR), to take place remotely. This became one of the biggest challenges for the series during the pandemic because recording equipment was needed in each actor's house. Newsome already had a recording studio at her house that she used for the series.

=== Animation and design ===
Independent animation studio Titmouse provides the animation for the series, with Juno Lee serving as supervising director for the first season. Work on the series' animation began by the end of February 2019. The series' animation style reflects the look of "prime time animated comedy" series such as The Simpsons, but with more detailed backgrounds and environments than is traditional for prime time animation.

Promotional poster for the season finale featuring guest characters William Riker and Deanna Troi in front of the USS Titan. Showrunner Mike McMahan wanted to meet fan expectations for the Titan's design, and was also specific about the designs for Riker and Troi who were introduced in the live-action series Star Trek: The Next Generation.

The uniforms worn by the crew of the Cerritos are based on unused designs for the film Star Trek Generations (1994), which McMahan said looked similar to designs from previous Star Trek series but were unique enough that fans would associate them with Lower Decks. The uniforms have a flap on the front, and continue the Next Generation tradition of coming in yellow for engineering, blue for medical and science, and red for command. He suggested that these uniforms were just for California-class ships like the Cerritos; other Starfleet officers, such as the crew of the USS Titan, appear in the grey-shouldered uniforms from the Next Generation-era films and Deep Space Nine. Mariner also wears that uniform in a flashback to her time on the USS Quito. Regarding the use of multiple uniform styles at once, McMahan explained that not all starships get "the new stuff" at the same time. In the episode "Much Ado About Boimler"—which was inspired by the two-part Next Generation episode "Chain of Command"—Freeman, Ransom, and Shaxs wear the same stealth outfits that the characters in "Chain of Command" wear.

McMahan hoped that references to Star Trek: The Animated Series in Lower Decks would honor it as the franchise's first animated series. He wanted to make it "even more canon than it was before", referencing a long-time fan debate regarding whether the series was officially part of the franchise's canon. When discussing the characters James T. Kirk and Spock from Star Trek: The Original Series (often abbreviated by fans as "TOS", which Lower Decks also jokingly uses in-universe to mean "Those Old Scientists"), an image of the pair from The Animated Series is shown instead of animating them with the style of Lower Decks. In addition to featuring alien species from all of the live-action Star Trek series, Lower Decks includes some "deep cut" species from The Animated Series: the cat-like Caitian Dr. T'Ana is the same species as the Animated Series character M'Ress; a Vendorian shapeshifter, first introduced in The Animated Series, appears in "Envoys"; and the three-armed Division 14 specialist in "Much Ado About Boimler" is an Edosian like the character Arex from The Animated Series. McMahan said these characters "fit in perfectly in [the Lower Decks] world" and the series did not have to justify the difference in appearance from the original version that a live-action adaptation of the species likely would.

The series' design team worked with John Van Citters, vice president for Star Trek brand management, and CBS Studios on the design of the USS Titan for the season finale. The ship had never been seen on screen before, but had appeared in video games and on book covers, and McMahan wanted to "make sure we got it right because there are fans out there for who the Titan is a favorite ship". McMahan was also very specific about the designs of returning characters Riker and Troi, down to Riker's height and Troi's larger-than-normal pupils. McMahan hoped that the appearance of the Titan and these characters would feel like "one day in a bigger story about those guys". The episode "Veritas" features many starships from throughout the franchise, with a sequence set at a starship museum that holds a 21st-century Vulcan ship like the one seen in Star Trek: First Contact (1996), a Klingon battlecruiser, a Jem'Hadar fighter, a Tholian ship, a Ferengi shuttle, and various Federation shuttles from The Original Series and The Next Generation. In the episode, the characters steal a Romulan Bird of Prey—a ship with cloaking technology that has appeared throughout the Star Trek franchise—from the museum, and they also use a long-range Vulcan shuttle that was introduced in Star Trek: The Motion Picture (1979).

=== Music ===
Composer Chris Westlake included several references to previous Star Trek music throughout the season, including an homage to fight music from The Original Series for a scene where Ransom fights an alien using the same distinctive fighting style as that series' protagonist, James T. Kirk. For "Crisis Point", Westlake wrote "movie-fied" versions of his Lower Decks theme, paying homage to the composers of the Star Trek films such as the nautical, French horn-based sound of James Horner from Star Trek II: The Wrath of Khan (1982). The episode also features a sequence where the crew slowly circles the Cerritos in a direct homage to a scene in Star Trek: The Motion Picture. Westlake referenced the music that Jerry Goldsmith wrote for the latter scene. In "Temporal Edict", Boimler is heard humming Goldsmith's main theme from The Motion Picture and The Next Generation.

The season's score was originally planned to be recorded with a 60-person orchestra in a traditional recording studio, but, due to the pandemic, each musician was recorded individually from home and then mixed together. The pandemic also caused the timeline for the series' release to be moved up to before that of Star Trek: Discovery's third season, which meant Westlake had around two months less time to work on the score than he had expected. He described this as being "super squeezed". Selections from Westlake's score for the season were included in the series' Vol. 1 soundtrack, which was released by Lakeshore Records on October 8, 2021.

== Marketing ==
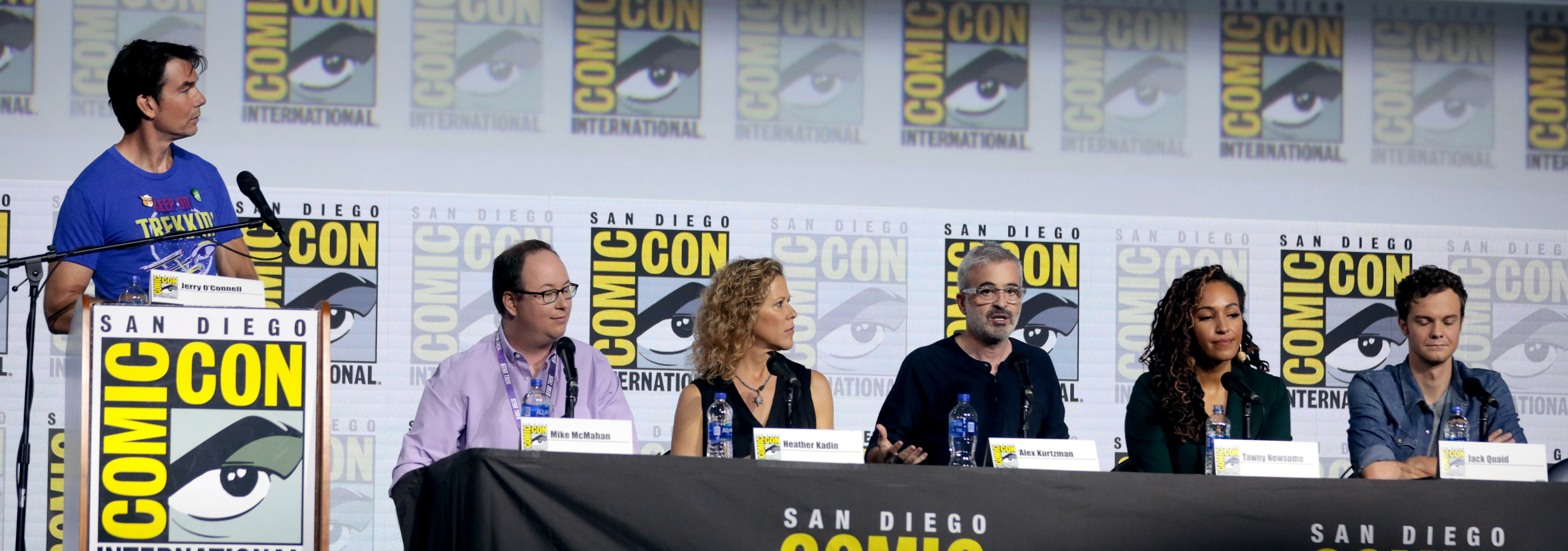
Star Trek: Lower Decks panel at the 2019 San Diego Comic-Con

The series was promoted during the "Star Trek Universe" panel at the 2019 San Diego Comic-Con, where the main cast and first look images were revealed. Further details were discussed at a panel specifically for Lower Decks at Star Trek Las Vegas 2019. A trailer and poster were released in July 2020. Allie Gemmill of Collider called the trailer "a ton of fun and then some", comparing its adult-oriented tone to the series Rick and Morty which McMahan previously worked on. This was followed by a "Star Trek Universe" panel at the 2020 Comic-Con@Home virtual convention where McMahan and the cast discussed the series and revealed its opening scene. At the end of July, All Access released a new trailer celebrating "23 weeks of New Trek" and featuring footage from both the first season of Lower Decks and the third season of Discovery; the 23 weeks include both series, with Lower Decks premiering on August 6 and running for 10 weeks, followed the next week by the premiere of Discovery which then ran for 13 weeks. Animation studio Titmouse released a shirt with a unique design on it alongside each episode of Lower Decks. The designs were only available for one week each. Fans who bought all ten designs received a bonus eleventh shirt.

== Release ==
=== Streaming and broadcast ===
The season premiered on August 6, 2020, on CBS All Access in the United States, and ran for 10 episodes until October 8. Like previous All Access Star Trek series, each episode of the season was broadcast in Canada by Bell Media on the same day as the All Access release, on the specialty channels CTV Sci-Fi Channel (English) and Z (French) before streaming on Crave.

International distribution for the series had not been secured by the time of its premiere in the U.S. and Canada. The series was originally intended for release later in 2020, following the release of the third season of Star Trek: Discovery, but the premiere date for Lower Decks was moved up after the COVID-19 pandemic impacted the post-production timeline for Discovery and forced that series to be delayed. McMahan explained that negotiations for international distribution could not be similarly moved up, so the release of the series outside of the U.S. and Canada would have to wait until those negotiations were completed. Amazon Prime Video was revealed, in December 2020, to have picked up the streaming rights for the series in several territories—including Europe, Australia, New Zealand, Japan, and India—with the full first season released on the service on January 22, 2021.

In September 2020, ViacomCBS announced that CBS All Access would be expanded and rebranded as Paramount+ in March 2021. The season remained on Paramount+ along with future seasons. In February 2023, Paramount made a new deal with Prime Video for the series' international streaming rights. This allowed the season to be added to Paramount+ in some other countries in addition to remaining on Prime Video. In July 2023, Bell Media announced that the series would be leaving Crave over the following month. It would continue to be broadcast on CTV Sci-Fi and past seasons would remain available on CTV.ca and the CTV app.

=== Home media ===
The season was released on DVD, Blu-Ray, and limited edition steelbook formats in the U.S. on May 18, 2021. The release includes almost two hours of bonus features, including deleted and extended animatics; featurettes on the cast and characters, the references to other Star Trek series, and the making of each episode; and an "over-the-top action trailer" for the fictional film Crisis Point from the episode of the same name.

== Reception ==
=== Critical response ===
Rotten Tomatoes reported 68% approval with an average rating of 7.20/10 based on 47 reviews. The website's critical consensus reads, "Fun, but not very bold, Lower Decks flips the script on Star Trek regulation just enough to stand out in the franchise, if not the greater animation landscape." Metacritic, which uses a weighted average, assigned a score of 59 out of 100 based on reviews from 17 critics, indicating "mixed or average reviews".

Robert Lloyd at the Los Angeles Times praised the series for being a genuine Star Trek series rather than a spoof, and favorably compared it to Futurama. IndieWire's Christian Blauvelt agreed, saying it "might be the most Trek series ever" and on par with other "comedic riffs on Trek" such as Galaxy Quest (1999) and The Orville. David Bianculli at NPR did not think the series was as delightful as Galaxy Quest but found it to be better than The Orville since animation allowed it to be "looser with its ideas and its humor". TV Guide's Keith Phipps and SFX Magazine's Richard Edwards both said the series balanced respect for Star Trek with the needs of comedy, but Josh Bell at Comic Book Resources felt the series was not always successful in keeping that balance. He did think Star Trek fans would enjoy the series, as did Josh Jackson of Paste and Joshua Rivera of The Verge. Writing for /Film, Ben Pearson thought the series was "surprisingly friendly to newbies", but CNN's Brian Lowry said it was unlikely to attract new subscribers to CBS All Access. He felt it would amuse the committed Star Trek fans who had already subscribed. Several reviewers said McMahan's love for Star Trek was key to the success of the franchise's first animated comedy series. Alex Maidy at JoBlo was pleased the series did not "destroy the legacy of Star Trek", and Josh Tyler at Giant Freakin Robot called it "more like Star Trek than anything the franchise has produced since Voyager" which he attributed to McMahan being a "real Trekkie". A. J. Black, reviewing the season for Cultural Conversation, called it "exactly the series most Star Trek fans have wished for since 2005" which made the franchise "not just funny, but fun again. It has been a long time since any fan felt that".

Daniel D'Addario of Variety said branching out to an animated comedy series was admirable for the Star Trek franchise, but "if the joke of Lower Decks is that its characters... fall short of demanding a show about their adventures, it's not hard to agree". Noah Gittell of The Guardian also felt the series would be a promising departure for a franchise entry if it had more ambition. The fast pacing and large number of Star Trek references were criticized by many reviewers. Rob Owen at the Pittsburgh Post-Gazette felt the series was "not often funny" and substituted chaos for comedy, and Zack Handlen at The A.V. Club said it was "less 'funny' than it is 'the idea of funny'" with a reliance on fan-service. Alan Sepinwall at Rolling Stone said the number of references were preventing McMahan from making the "wildly irreverent—and, more importantly, actually funny—comedy" series that he wanted to. Sepinwall also suggested that a Rick and Morty-style series could not work without that series' creator, Dan Harmon. Tara Ariano at Primetimer said the series was "a little too reverential" toward the franchise, and Mike Hale of The New York Times described it as "half Star Trek fan service and half smutty workplace sitcom... it doesn't register very strongly as either". Stuff's James Croot called the series a "lowering of the bar" for the franchise and "crassly crude", suggesting audiences watch The Orville or Galaxy Quest instead. Brian Tallerico at The Playlist felt the series did not live up to previous Star Trek stories, and Keith R. A. DeCandido at Tor.com said it "can't seem to make up its mind whether it's a comedy in the Star Trek universe, a parody of Star Trek, or a 21st-century office comedy awkwardly transplanted onto a 24th-century Starfleet vessel."

Reviewers often noted the animation style's similarity to Rick and Morty. Lloyd said it was "not especially elegant", and Fienberg described it as "bland-but-amiable", while Tyler felt it was "fairly low-rent [and] easy" but praised the results, especially the starships and backdrops. Angelica Jade Bastién at Vulture said the animation was not visually unique, but still found it to be "bright and eye-catching", and Blauvelt said it was "purposefully cartoony—but never less than engaging". Multiple critics praised the use of animation to create locations, aliens, and scenarios that would be difficult or impossible in a live-action series, including Sepinwall, Shannon Miller at Collider, and Glen Weldon of NPR who all referred to Lower Decks's "unlimited special effects budget". Multiple critics also highlighted the homages to The Next Generation in the series' title sequence, especially the title font and music. Discussing the cast, Jamie Lovett at ComicBook.com said Newsome, Quaid, Wells, and Cordero all had "infectious energy and zealous performances". Newsome received especial praise from various critics. Tyler, conversely, said Mariner was annoying and "there to create 'comedy' by shouting a lot and being rude to everyone". DeCandido concurred with this, calling her "completely unlikeable... a mean horrible person". He was also critical of the lack of screen time for Tendi and Rutherford compared to Mariner and Boimler, a sentiment that was echoed by James Whitbrook at Gizmodo.

Based on the first four episodes, Bastién felt the series had potential to be "more dynamic and narratively sound" if it embraced earnestness. Writing for RogerEbert.com, Roxana Hadadi felt it needed a "clearer course forward" if it was to find its footing in future episodes, and Phipps said it still needed to develop the character relationships that other Star Trek series are known for. Handlen noted that Star Trek series are well known for taking time to come into their own, and felt this could happen with Lower Decks too; he was more positive about the series after the first season ended, stating that it "quickly found its focus" after a "clumsy start". Tara Bennett of IGN also felt there were issues with the series to begin with, specifically the "hyper-fast delivery [of jokes] and overly busy episodes", but said the series had "mellow[ed] out" by the end of the season and added a lot more depth to the characters and stories. In contrast, Blauvelt and Black both felt the series was the exception to the Star Trek rule and had found its footing straight away. Discussing the season as a whole, Drew Dietsch at Giant Freakin Robot called it "the best Star Trek series in recent memory" and specifically praised the "outright goofiness and wide-eyed optimism" of the characters as well as the series' episodic structure.

=== Accolades ===
The season is one of 117 television series that received the ReFrame Stamp for the years 2020 to 2021. The stamp is awarded by the gender equity coalition ReFrame as a "mark of distinction" for film and television projects that are proven to have gender-balanced hiring, with stamps being awarded to projects that hire female-identifying people, especially women of color, in four out of eight critical areas of their production.

Accolades received by Star Trek: Lower Decks season 1
Year	Award	Category	Nominee(s)	Result	Ref.
2021	Annie Awards	Outstanding Achievement for Music in an Animated Television/Media Production	Chris Westlake (for "Crisis Point")	Nominated	
2021	Critics' Choice Super Awards	Best Animated Series	Star Trek: Lower Decks	Nominated	
2021	Critics' Choice Super Awards	Best Voice Actor in an Animated Series	Jack Quaid	Nominated	
2021	Critics' Choice Super Awards	Best Voice Actress in an Animated Series	Tawny Newsome	Nominated	
2021	NAACP Image Awards	Outstanding Animated Series	Star Trek: Lower Decks	Nominated	
2021	NAACP Image Awards	Outstanding Character Voice-Over Performance (Television)	Dawnn Lewis	Nominated	
2021	Primetime Creative Arts Emmy Awards	Outstanding Sound Editing for a Comedy or Drama Series (Half-Hour)	James Lucero, James Singleton, Jeff Halbert, Michael Britt, and Amber Funk (for "No Small Parts")	Nominated	
2021	Women's Image Network Awards	Outstanding Actress Animated Program	Dawnn Lewis	Won	
2021	Women's Image Network Awards	Outstanding Actress Animated Program	Tawny Newsome	Nominated	
