= Yo, Is This Racist? =

Comedy and race studies advice blog and podcast

- Language: English

Cast and voices
- Starring: Andrew Ti and Tawny Newsome

Yo, Is This Racist? (also stylized as Yo! Is This Racist?) is a blog and associated podcast run by Andrew Ti, addressing questions from readers and listeners about whether given phenomena are examples of racism. In 2018, Tawny Newsome joined the podcast as co-host.

Ti, a writer for Comedy Central at the time, launched the Yo, Is This Racist? blog in November 2011 on Tumblr as the result of a conversation with a coworker about whether Yosemite Sam's oath "cotton-picking" is racist. Within 24 hours, the blog had nearly 2000 followers. The podcast was started a year later and was hosted by Earwolf from its creation. In November 2020, Ti and Newsome chose to leave the Earwolf network and launched Sub-Optimal Pods to host the podcast independently, a move which they said freed them from "trying to be the wokest show on a comedy network".

== Reception ==
The New York Times has called the blog "funny and profane", while MTV describes it as "edutaining" and the Huffington Post compares Ti to "Dear Abby for racists". Complex has ranked it the 4th-best Tumblr blog "of all time".

Vox has listed the podcast as one that people "should be listening to", while the journal Humanity & Society considers it a "prime example of 'racial discourse'", "astute", and a "humorous and potentially disarming critique of color-blind ideology and articulation of systemic racism", but criticizes it for its occasional "epistemological uncertainty", and for Ti's "generally nonconfrontational approach with guests" which can result in "somewhat awkward moments of misunderstanding or equivocation".
