= Those Old Scientists =

- Star Trek: Strange New Worlds episode
- This episode is a crossover between the live-action series Strange New Worlds and the animated series Star Trek: Lower Decks. It ends with a scene where the main characters of Strange New Worlds are depicted in animated form (pictured).
- Episode no.: Season 2 Episode 7
- Directed by: Jonathan Frakes
- Written by: Kathryn Lyn; Bill Wolkoff
- Cinematography by: Ian Anderson
- Editing by: Andrew Coutts
- Original release date: July 22, 2023
- Running time: 48 minutes

Guest appearances
- Tawny Newsome as Beckett Mariner; Jack Quaid as Brad Boimler; Noël Wells as D'Vana Tendi; Eugene Cordero as Sam Rutherford; Jerry O'Connell as Jack Ransom; Greg Bryk as Harr Caras; Carol Kane as Pelia

Episode chronology
| ← Previous "Lost in Translation" | Next → "Under the Cloak of War" |
- Star Trek: Strange New Worlds season 2

"Those Old Scientists" is the seventh episode of the second season of the American television series Star Trek: Strange New Worlds. The series follows Captain Christopher Pike and the crew of the starship Enterprise in the 23rd century as they explore new worlds and carry out missions during the decade before Star Trek: The Original Series (1966–1969). The episode is a crossover with the animated comedy series Star Trek: Lower Decks (2020–2024) in which Ensigns Beckett Mariner and Brad Boimler from that series are sent back in time and interact with the crew of Pike's Enterprise, who try to send them back to their own time. It was written by Kathryn Lyn and Bill Wolkoff, and directed by Jonathan Frakes.

Anson Mount, Ethan Peck, and Rebecca Romijn respectively star as Pike, Spock, and Number One, along with Jess Bush, Christina Chong, Celia Rose Gooding, Melissa Navia, and Babs Olusanmokun. The second season of Strange New Worlds was announced in January 2022. It was revealed to have a crossover with Lower Decks that July, with Tawny Newsome (Mariner) and Jack Quaid (Boimler) reprising their roles in live-action. Noël Wells, Eugene Cordero, and Jerry O'Connell also reprise their respective voice roles as D'Vana Tendi, Sam Rutherford, and Jack Ransom. Lower Decks showrunner Mike McMahan was closely involved in the episode. Studio Titmouse returned to provide animation.

"Those Old Scientists" premiered at San Diego Comic-Con on July 22, 2023, and was released on the streaming service Paramount+ later that day. It was estimated to have high viewership and audience demand, and was positively received by critics for successfully merging the tones of both Strange New Worlds and Lower Decks, for taking character arcs seriously despite the overall humorous tone, and for Quaid and Newsome's transition to live-action. The episode was nominated for a Hugo Award.

== Plot ==
In the 24th century, an away team from the Starfleet starship USS Cerritos arrives at the planet Krulmuth to perform routine scans on an old portal. While Ensign Brad Boimler excitedly says that it was discovered by the crew of the USS Enterprise, led by Captain Christopher Pike, D'Vana Tendi insists it was found by an Orion science vessel that her ancestor was stationed on. When Boimler has his picture taken at the portal, it unexpectedly activates and he is sucked through to the 23rd century where he meets the Enterprise crew.

While the crew tries to figure out how to send Boimler back to his own time, Boimler—nervous around the historical figures that he considers to be heroes—unsuccessfully tries to avoid divulging knowledge of future events. An Orion ship arrives and Boimler convinces Pike that they are a harmless science vessel, but the Orions transport the portal onto their ship and warp away. Boimler helps the crew track the Orions and they get the portal back by trading grain supplies which were destined for a colony in need. The Enterprise crew takes the portal back to Krulmuth. Before Boimler can return to his time, Ensign Beckett Mariner comes through to rescue him and exhausts the portal's power supply.

Boimler and Spock fail to synthesize more of the portal's power source, the rare material horonium, while Mariner discovers that her idol Nyota Uhura is too focused on work and needs help relaxing. Enterprise engineer Pelia informs Boimler of the irreplaceable nature of the grain they traded to the Orions, and a remorseful Boimler tries to contact the Orions to get it back. He and Mariner are detained and have a conversation with Pike, during which Boimler realizes that the previous Enterprise (NX-01) had horonium components and a piece of that ship was included in the construction of the current Enterprise. On the surface of Krulmuth, the Starfleet officers encounter the Orions, who received Boimler's signal. Pike explains the situation and Boimler mentions that, in the future, Orions are no longer seen as dishonorable pirates and that one of their friends is an Orion. Pike asks for the grain back and, in exchange, offers to let history remember that the portal was discovered by Orion scientists; the Orion captain happily agrees. Boimler and Mariner successfully return to the future.

== Production ==
=== Development ===
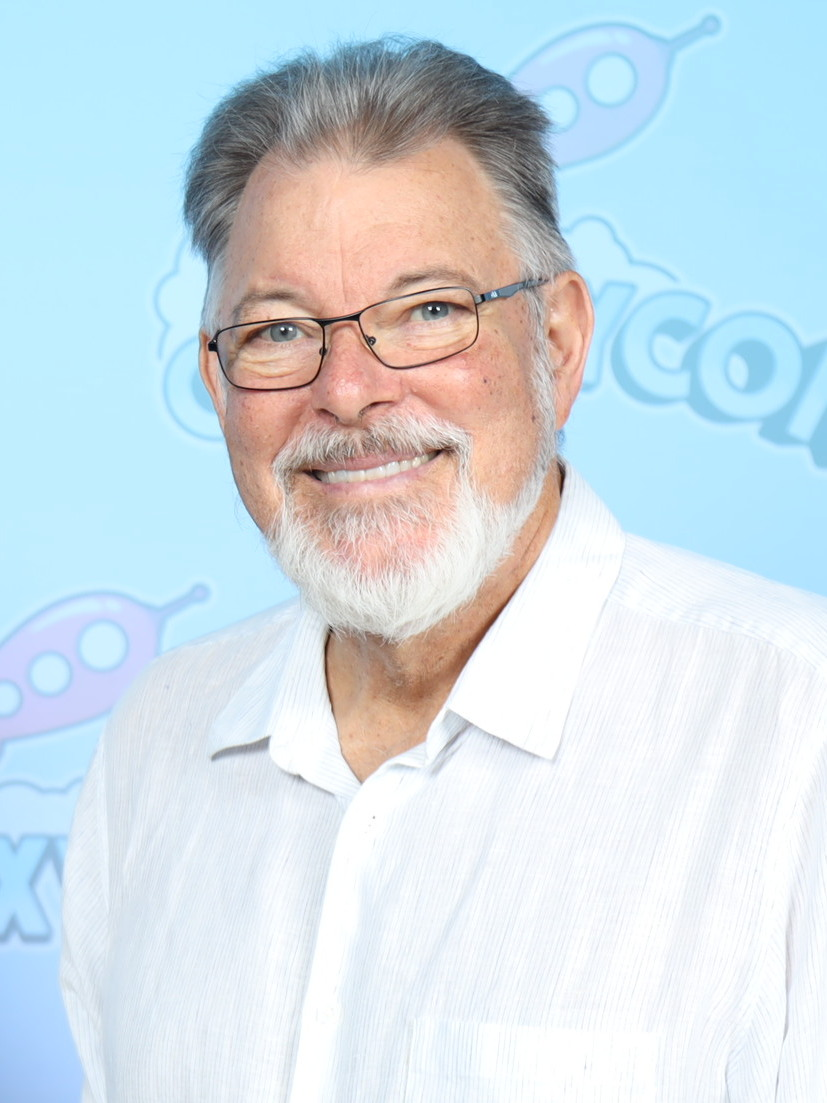
Director Jonathan Frakes was chosen for the episode because of his long history with the Star Trek franchise

Executive producer Alex Kurtzman envisioned Star Trek: Strange New Worlds, a spin-off from the series Star Trek: Discovery (2017–2024), as an ongoing series that could cover the seven years between Discovery's second season (2019) and the accident that seriously injures Christopher Pike in Star Trek: The Original Series (1966–1969). Frequent Star Trek actor and director Jonathan Frakes said in December 2021 that he was booked to direct an episode of the second season of Strange New Worlds, and Paramount+ officially announced the season a month later, ahead of the first season's release. Showrunners Henry Alonso Myers and Akiva Goldsman committed to the first season's episodic structure and said they would "go for broke" in differentiating the second season's episodes with unique genres. Goldsman said it would have some "creative stretches" and "big swings" that had not been seen in Star Trek before.

In December 2021, Kurtzman said there was potential for the different Star Trek series he was producing to crossover, as long as there was a story reason to justify this. Crossovers between previous Star Trek series were infrequent and generally limited to characters from one series making a guest appearance on another. During a Star Trek Universe panel at San Diego Comic-Con in July 2022, star Anson Mount announced that the season would have a crossover episode with the animated comedy series Star Trek: Lower Decks (2020–2024). Myers explained that one of the Strange New Worlds writers, David Reed, also worked on the series The Boys (2019–2026) which stars Lower Decks voice actor Jack Quaid. Reed and Quaid had discussed the potential of their Star Trek series crossing over, and Reed suggested the idea to the Strange New Worlds writers. They moved forward with the idea after Kurtzman also suggested it.

The episode is titled "Those Old Scientists", referencing a joke in Lower Decks that explains what future Starfleet officers are referring to when they call the time period of The Original Series the "TOS" era. It was written by Kathryn Lyn—a writer on both series—and Bill Wolkoff, and directed by Frakes, who was prevented from directing an episode of the first season when the COVID-19 pandemic impacted his directing schedule for the series Star Trek: Picard (2020–2023). Frakes believed he was chosen to direct "Those Old Scientists", the 222nd Star Trek episode he had worked on, because of his guest role as William Riker on Lower Decks and because his long history with the franchise aligned with the amount of lore in the episode.

=== Writing ===
Lower Decks showrunner Mike McMahan said he was "heavily involved" in the crossover. He previously did uncredited work on the first season episode "Spock Amok" and the Strange New Worlds team enjoyed working with him. McMahan was pitched the crossover episode and gave several suggestions to make it "feel more Lower Decks". He also did multiple passes on the dialogue, and was involved in editing the episode as well. Goldsman initially felt the crossover would be as simple as having the Lower Decks characters "just come over", but they found integrating the different tones of the two series to be unexpectedly difficult. He said it would not be a Lower Decks episode in live-action. Myers said viewers did not have to know Lower Decks to understand the episode, but fans of that series would appreciate the details that are carried over for the crossover.

The episode features the characters Beckett Mariner and Brad Boimler from Lower Decks traveling back in time from the 24th century to the 23rd century and arriving on the USS Enterprise (NCC-1701) under Pike. The original plan was to primarily focus on Boimler with a small role for Mariner, but this was reworked based on input from McMahan and the executive producers. In the final version, Boimler travels back in time first and interacts with the Enterprise crew. Frakes said they did this until they had "milked all the fish-out-of water elements" and then Mariner travels back to get Boimler and "brings a brand-new energy to the room". For both characters, meeting Pike and his crew is literally meeting their heroes from Starfleet history. Frakes felt the success of the episode came from balancing the "wacky hijinks" of the Lower Decks characters with more "emotional, self-aware, self-evolved... character study" scenes. The latter includes Boimler accidentally revealing aspects of the future to Christine Chapel which has major ramifications for her relationship with Spock in future episodes.

=== Casting ===
Anson Mount, Ethan Peck, and Rebecca Romijn star in the series as Captain Christopher Pike, science officer Spock, and first officer Una Chin-Riley / Number One, respectively. Also starring are Jess Bush as nurse Christine Chapel, Christina Chong as chief security officer La'An Noonien-Singh, Celia Rose Gooding as Ensign Nyota Uhura, Melissa Navia as helmsman Erica Ortegas, and Babs Olusanmokun as Dr. Joseph M'Benga.

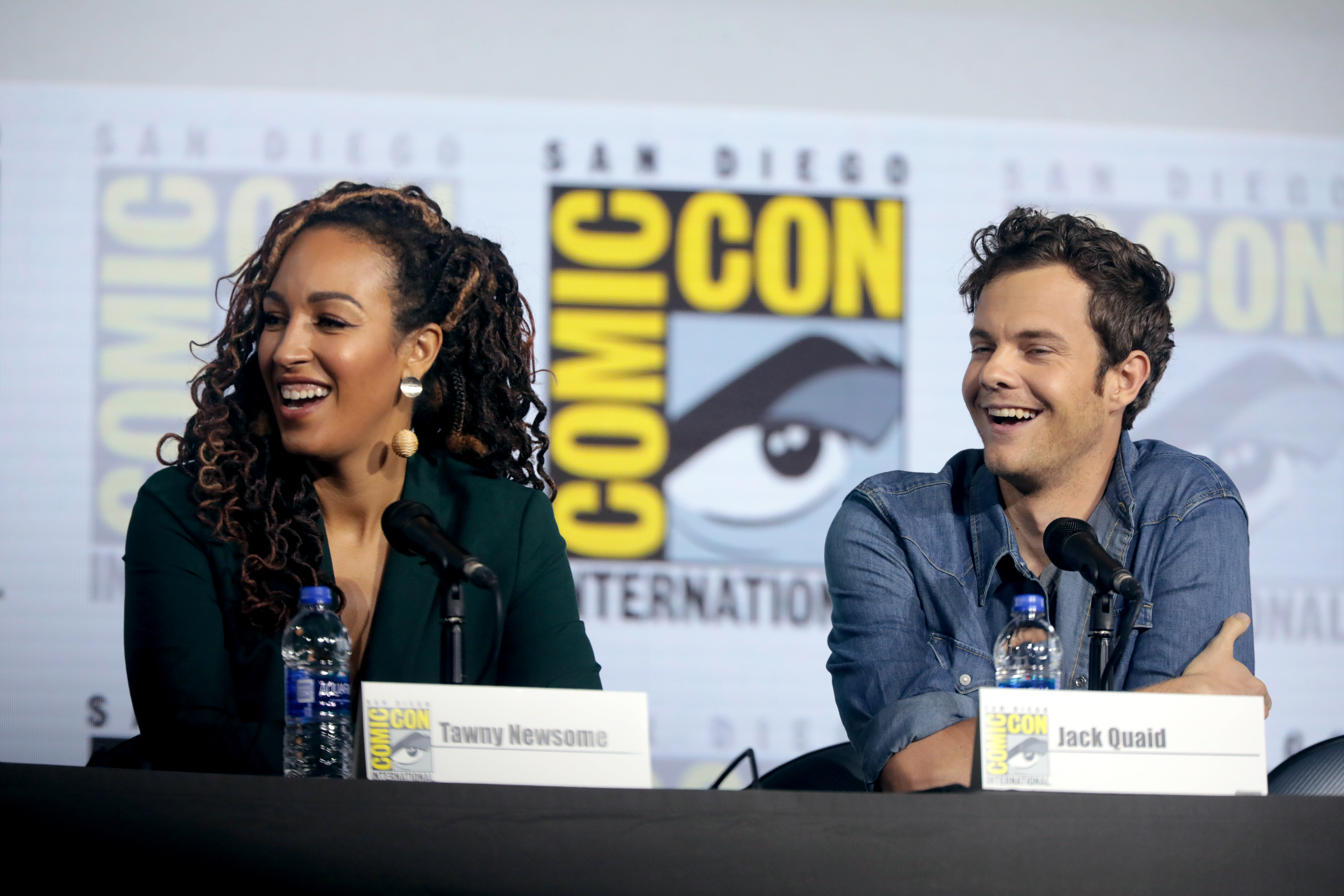
Tawny Newsome (left) and Jack Quaid (right) reprise their roles from Star Trek: Lower Decks in the episode

With the episode's announcement, Tawny Newsome and Jack Quaid were set to reprise their respective roles as Beckett Mariner and Brad Boimler. Quaid soon clarified that there would be elements of animation in the episode but he and Newsome would primarily be playing their characters and interacting with the Strange New Worlds cast in live-action, as opposed to the animated characters sharing scenes with live-action characters like was done for the film Who Framed Roger Rabbit (1988). Noël Wells, Eugene Cordero, and Jerry O'Connell also reprise their Lower Decks roles as D'Vana Tendi, Sam Rutherford, and Jack Ransom for animated scenes. McMahan said they wanted other Lower Decks actors to appear in live-action but scheduling issues meant only Quaid and Newsome could. As a reference to O'Connell and Romijn being married in real-life, Ransom makes a "semi-lewd comment" about being attracted to Number One. Also guest starring in the episode are Greg Bryk as the Orion captain Harr Caras, and Carol Kane in her recurring role as Enterprise engineer Pelia.

=== Design ===
Newsome and Quaid both had input on how their characters would look in live-action. Newsome believed Mariner should have a "full head of curly hair" and worked with makeup artist Scotia Boyd on the character's "winged" eye liner. For Boimler, who has purple hair, Quaid considered dying his hair but had limited time due to other commitments and also did not want to reveal the crossover early by being recognized in Toronto with purple hair. Several wigs with different shades of purple were tested on set, including one that went through a lot of camera tests which was "a little more cartoonishly purple". Quaid compared it to characters from anime. They settled on a "slightly more subdued, more realistic purple" for the final wig.

The Lower Decks uniforms were recreated for live action by Strange New Worlds costume designer Bernadette Croft. The same fabric was used as the series' other Starfleet uniforms, but they chose not to add any microprint details like with the other uniforms to more closely match the simple, flat design seen in Lower Decks. The fabric was backed with neoprene to make the costumes smoother. A darker shade of red than the one seen in Lower Decks was used so they contrasted less with the other Starfleet uniforms in the episode. Details that Croft carried over from Lower Decks include charcoal-colored pants, the Starfleet emblem on the soles of their shoes, and Mariner's more casual style with her sleeves rolled-up and a scrunchy in her hair. McMahan was consulted on the costumes and gave his approval. Frakes, who had a lot of experience wearing Starfleet uniforms in previous Star Trek media, also gave his thoughts on the costumes. Quaid said trying on the costumes for the first time was surreal and Newsome said it felt like they were "really in Starfleet".

=== Filming ===
Filming for the season began in February 2022 at CBS Stages Canada in Mississauga, Ontario. Frakes travelled to Toronto during the week of April 4 to start work. In addition to his familiarity with the tone of Lower Decks, Frakes had also directed Mount, Peck, and Romijn for the second season of Discovery so he was familiar with Strange New Worlds's main cast. Production for the season wrapped on July 1.

The production had to work around scheduling conflicts for Quaid with The Boys and the film Oppenheimer (2023), and Newsome with the series Space Force (2020–2022). Peck said the filming schedule for the first two seasons of Strange New Worlds, which was almost back-to-back and had been impacted by the COVID-19 pandemic, was "intense and grueling". He said the arrival of Quaid and Newsome brought a "boisterous and fun energy" that he appreciated. Newsome used the phrase "chaos bomb", and admitted to accidentally breaking several elements of the Enterprise sets when she was unable to stop herself from touching things. Peck and Quaid had met years earlier at a Dragon Con convention and bonded over their shared history as actors from famous Hollywood families. Peck was excited for Quaid to join the series and said they "got along famously", earning the nickname "Spoimler" on set. The equivalent for Newsome was a "Marhura" relationship with Gooding after she expressed interest in seeing Mariner interact with Uhura. McMahan heard from the actors that the crossover episode was "the most fun [they had] had", and regretted not being able to visit the set. He expressed interest in doing another crossover and Frakes said discussions about one started as soon as filming ended.

Quaid studied episodes of Lower Decks to ensure he was recreating the movements and mannerisms of the animated Boimler correctly, including a distinctive speed walk, while Newsome chose to just act like herself since that is how she portrays the animated version of Mariner. Quaid was particularly excited to be directed by Frakes and said it was a meta experience considering Boimler is a fan of Riker and temporarily works for him in Lower Decks. Frakes said the producers allowed Quaid and Newsome to improvise on set, a rarity for live-action Star Trek, which they were used to doing during recording for Lower Decks. Quaid said his approach to improvising for the episode was to ask for forgiveness rather than permission. Newsome improvised a line about being surprised that Spock is "hot" which Frakes felt was one of the funniest moments in the episode. She also improvised a line that explains one of Mariner's jokes which Frakes suggested they give to Peck. For a scene where Pike discusses his future accident with Boimler and Mariner, Newsome was careful not to appear ableist when miming the chair that Pike uses in The Original Series. After being impressed with Newsome's improvisation skills during filming, Kurtzman hired her as a writer for the series Star Trek: Starfleet Academy.

=== Animation ===
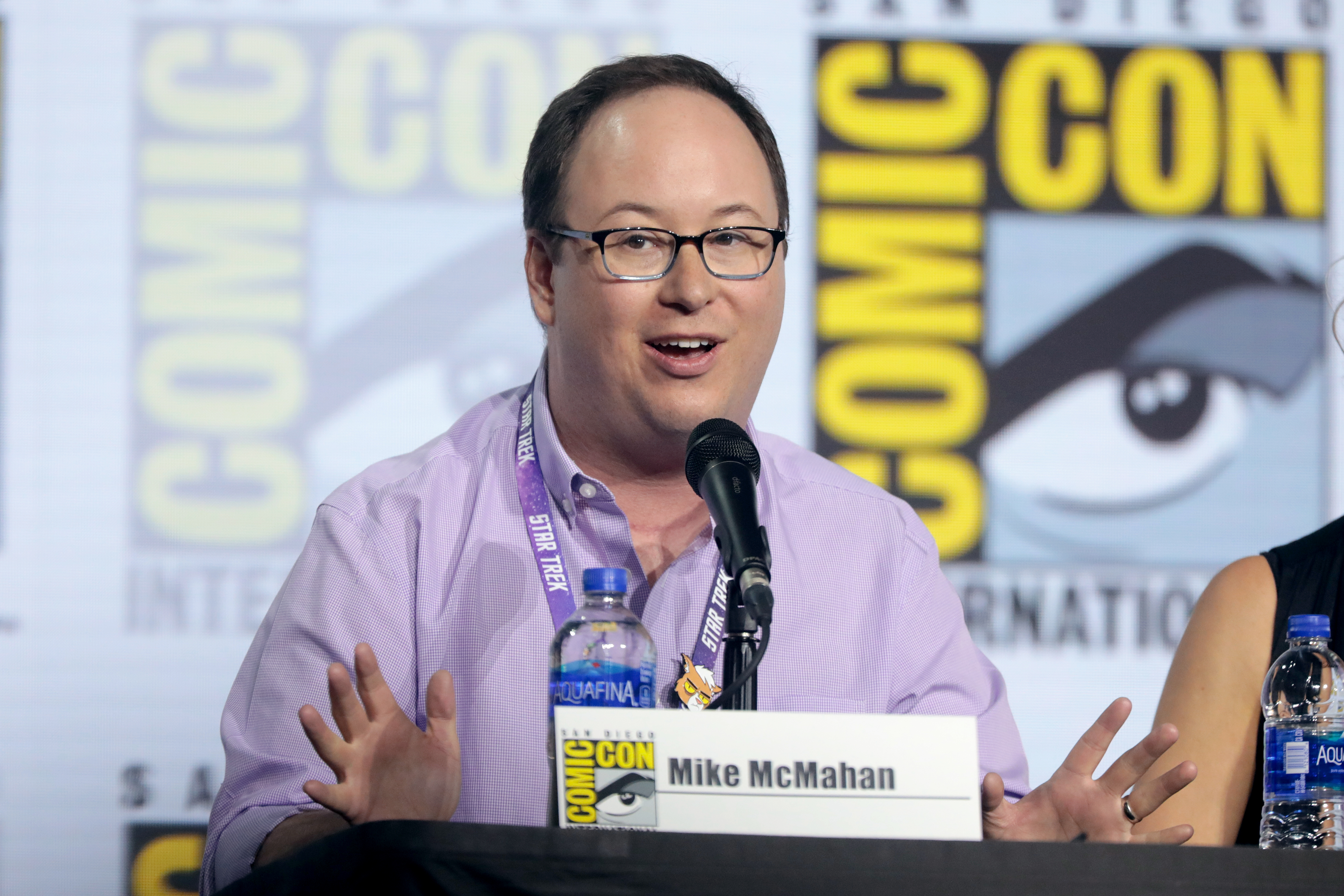
Star Trek: Lower Decks showrunner Mike McMahan was closely involved in the episode's production.

McMahan was involved in the episode's animated scenes, which used the same animation team and style as Lower Decks; independent animation studio Titmouse provided the animation for that series, using a style that reflects the look of "prime time animated comedy" series such as The Simpsons (1989–present). McMahan also directed the voice actors.

In addition to animated scenes with the Lower Decks characters, the episode has a final scene where the crew of the Enterprise are animated in the Lower Decks style and discuss feeling "two-dimensional" after drinking cocktails that Mariner introduced them to. The episode also has a new version of the series' title sequence animated in the style of Lower Decks and featuring some Easter eggs that reference the animated series, such as a space creature that is seen eating the USS Cerritos in Lower Decks's opening credits. McMahan thought it was a shame that the crossover was announced ahead of time instead of surprising the audience by cutting straight to an animated scene with the Lower Decks characters. The script originally included an animated appearance by a sehlat, a bear-like creature from the planet Vulcan that was first seen in Star Trek: The Animated Series (1973–74), but this was cut.

== Release ==
The seventh episode of Strange New Worlds's second season was originally expected to be released on July 27, 2023, on the streaming service Paramount+ in the United States and other countries where the service is available. However, at the series' San Diego Comic-Con panel on July 22, "Those Old Scientists" was shown in full and Paramount+ announced that it would be released on the streaming service later that day. The episode, along with the rest of the second season, was released on DVD, Blu-Ray, and Limited Edition Steelbook formats in the US on December 5, 2023.

== Reception ==
=== Viewership ===
Whip Media, which tracks viewership data for the 19 million worldwide users of its TV Time app, ranked Strange New Worlds as the second-most watched original streaming series for US viewership during the week ending July 23, behind Disney+'s Secret Invasion. This was an increase from fourth place the previous week. Nielsen Media Research records streaming viewership on US television screens, and estimated that Strange New Worlds was the tenth-most watched original streaming series for the week ending July 23 with 324 million minutes watched. Strange New Worlds did not make it onto JustWatch's list of top 10 streaming series for that week.

=== Critical response ===
Several critics described the crossover episode as being highly anticipated. On review aggregator website Rotten Tomatoes, 100% of 6 critics reviews for the episode were positive and the average of rated reviews was 9.4 out of 10. It was positively compared to "Trials and Tribble-ations" (1996), an episode of the series Star Trek: Deep Space Nine (1993–1999) which crosses-over with The Original Series.

Keith R. A. DeCandido at Reactor praised "Those Old Scientists" as one of the best television crossovers ever, saying it worked as an episode of both Strange New Worlds and Lower Decks while also being "just a great episode of Star Trek". Scott Collura of IGN said it was an "instant classic", balancing the tones of both series "without breaking either". He attributed this to Frakes's direction and Strange New Worlds's ability to be malleable. Variety's Adam B. Vary also said the episode combined the tones of both series successfully. He said Frakes "never lets the episode curdle into fan worship, or spiral into silliness". At Vulture, Keith Phipps gave the episode four stars out of five and said the merging of the two series was "pretty effortless". Lacy Baugher of Den of Geek praised it as one of the best episodes of the season and gave it four-and-a-half stars out of five. She said it was "a ridiculously fun and funny time travel-based old-school adventure that shouldn't work at all, but absolutely does". Darren Mooney at The Escapist was less positive, finding the episode charming but "business as usual" for two series that are nostalgic about the wider franchise. Mooney said "Trials and Tribble-ations" was more of a departure for Deep Space Nine than "Those Old Scientists" is for either Strange New Worlds or Lower Decks.

Reviewing the episode for Gizmodo, James Whitbrook praised how the crossover was used as a meta commentary on Strange New Worlds and its characters. He said Star Trek fans had expectations for how Pike and his crew would be portrayed in the series based on their history in the franchise, but Strange New Worlds had "hit [them] with the reality that the versions of the characters we're seeing on screen right now aren't those images. They have to get there, they need to experiment and doubt and overcome and grow as people", and the episode shows Boimler and Mariner coming to a similar conclusion when they find versions of the Enterprise crew that do not match their expectations. Phipps discussed how the episode takes the story arcs of several Strange New Worlds characters seriously, despite the overall light and humorous tone. He highlighted Chapel's "heartbreaking" scene where she learns that her relationship with Spock is temporary. DeCandido and Baugher also highlighted that moment, praising Bush for her performance in the scene. Baugher said Bush is "generally great as Chapel, but her brief scenes this week are some of her best yet". Baugher also praised the impacts of the crossover on Pike's outlook on his future, giving him a "strangely hopeful moment" when he celebrates his birthday with the crew.

DeCandido said his favorite part of the episode was the new animated version of the opening credits. Baugher and Mooney both singled out the credits as being beautifully animated. Alex Cranz at The Verge said Quaid and Newsome moved seamlessly into live-action. Phipps said the transition from animation to live-action for Boimler and Mariner was aided by Quaid and Newsome bearing "more than a passing resemblance" to their respective characters. Mooney felt this transition was the best part of the episode, saying "Quaid's makeup and costuming is delightful, unafraid to appear potentially goofy in live action. Quaid's performance is good, giving, and game, particularly his efforts to recreate Boimler's animated choreography". Baugher said Quaid had not received the praise he deserved for his voice performance in Lower Decks and she found him to be "utterly charming" as the live-action version. She said Newsome was "as much a fast-talking wrecking ball here as she is in cartoon form". DeCandido found Mariner's personality to be less annoying in live-action than in animation.

=== Accolades ===
"Those Old Scientists" was named the 16th best episode of the year by Mashable. Frakes, Lyn, and Wolkoff were finalists for the 2024 Hugo Award for Best Dramatic Presentation, Short Form, for the episode.
