= D'Vana Tendi =

"Star Trek: Lower Decks" character

- Star Trek: Lower Decks character
- First appearance: "Second Contact" (2020); Star Trek: Lower Decks
- Created by: Mike McMahan, Alex Kurtzman
- Voiced by: Noël Wells

In-universe information
- Species: Orion
- Title: Mistress of the Winter Constellations
- Occupation: Pirate (formerly); Medic (Seasons 1-2); Trainee Science Officer (Seasons 3-4); Co-Senior Science Officer (Season 5)
- Affiliation: Orion Syndicate; United Federation of Planets; Starfleet
- Family: Shona Tendi (mother); B'Rt Tendi (father); D'Erika Tendi (younger sister); D'Erika's unborn daughter (niece)
- Origin: Orion
- Posting: USS Cerritos
- Rank: Ensign (Seasons 1-4); Lieutenant junior grade (Season 4-present)

D'Vana Tendi, commonly known simply as Tendi, is a fictional character from the American science fiction television series Star Trek: Lower Decks. She is the first Orion main character in a Star Trek show. Among Orions, she is known as the Mistress of the Winter Constellations.

Tendi is voiced by Noël Wells. She also appeared in the animated portions of the 2023 Star Trek: Strange New Worlds crossover episode "Those Old Scientists".

== Characterization ==
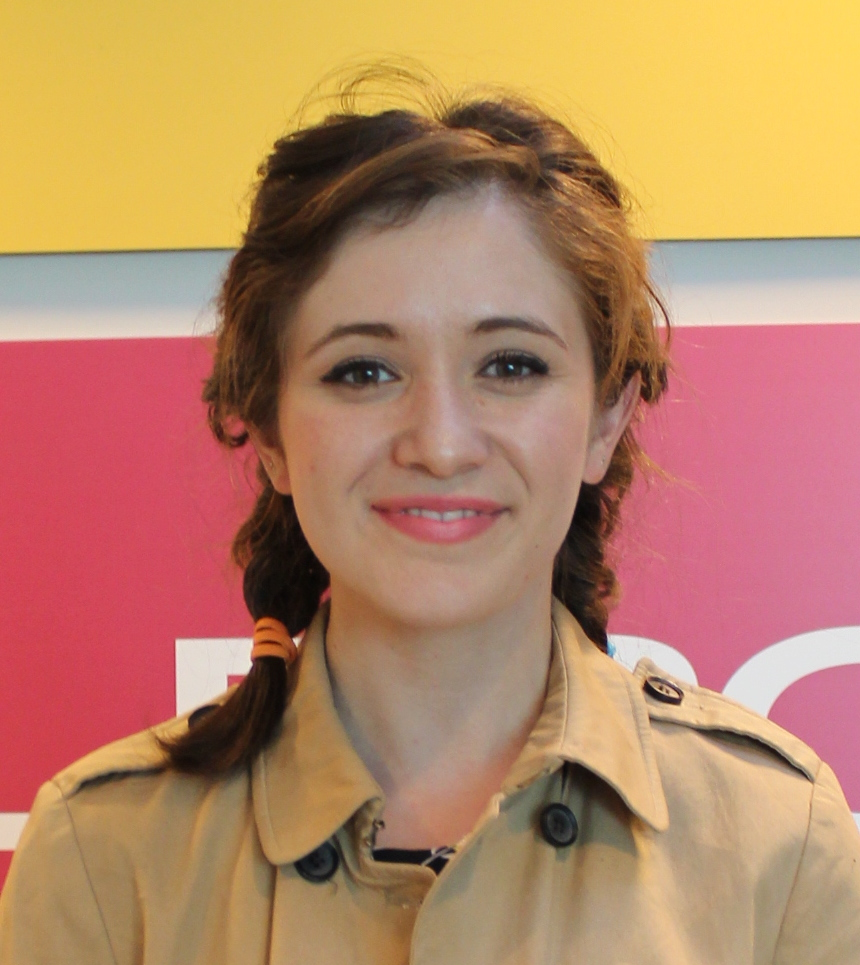
Noël Wells voices Tendi.

Lower Decks series creator Mike McMahan described Tendi as "hilarious and just a source of joy". McMahan noted that the character is "a huge Starfleet fan" and that "being on the ship, every day just blows her mind". Tendi often has to deal with stereotypes that cast Orions as thieves, slavers, and pirates (including from her friend Beckett Mariner in the episodes "Crisis Point" and "We'll Always Have Tom Paris"). Tendi also wants to be liked by all, saying "It kills me when someone doesn't like me!"

== Fictional biography ==
=== Lower Decks ===
==== Season 1 ====
In the series premiere, Ensign Tendi is a newly-arrived medic aboard the USS Cerritos, having transferred from Outpost 79. She is introduced to the ship by fellow Ensigns Brad Boimler and Beckett Mariner, also meeting cyborg engineer Ensign Sam Rutherford. Tendi's first day on the job is soon interrupted by an alien "rage virus" outbreak, but the crisis does little to dampen Tendi's enthusiasm.

Tendi and Rutherford quickly develop a close friendship, and are the focus of the B-plots of most first season episodes. They share an enthusiasm for science and engineering.

In the episode "Terminal Provocations", Tendi reveals to Rutherford that she did not complete the required course in spacewalking at Starfleet Academy, having been given a B due to a clerical error. This causes Rutherford to show her a holographic training program he had been developing featuring "Badgey" (a combadge-shaped parody of Clippy). However, a holodeck malfunction leads to Badgey attempting to murder Rutherford and Tendi in a homicidal rage.

In "Much Ado About Boimler", Tendi creates "The Dog", a genetically-engineered canine. However, due in part to Tendi's lack of knowledge on Earth dogs, The Dog demonstrates a series of bizarre abilities, including the ability to speak. This leads to The Dog being taken to "The Farm", a specialized Starfleet medical spa.

In "Veritas", a misunderstanding leads to Tendi being included in a Starfleet black operation on Romulus. During this mission, she demonstrates impressive combat training, defeating multiple armed Romulan guards in hand-to-hand combat.

In the season finale, Tendi is assigned to be the orientation liaison for a new crew member (mirroring the role Boimler played for her in the premiere)—an Exocomp named "Peanut Hamper". However, after Peanut Hamper abandons the Cerritos during a Pakled attack, Rutherford is forced to engage in a dangerous mission that leads to him losing his memories of the season's events, which Tendi sees as an opportunity "to become best friends all over again".

==== Season 2 ====
The second season of Lower Decks sees Tendi rebuilding her friendship with Rutherford, which is tested by Rutherford's lost memories and their mutual insecurities.

Tendi also grows closer to Mariner. Upon realizing that they have never shared a mission, Tendi and Mariner collaborate to retrieve a family heirloom for Tendi's boss—the ship's cantankerous chief medical officer Dr. T'Ana. During this mission, the two realize that they do not actually know each other very well, with Mariner applying stereotypes about Orions to Tendi and not knowing Tendi's first name. However, Mariner and Tendi bond through the adventure and renew their friendship.

Tendi's relationship with Dr. T'Ana also develops during the season. In addition to the aforementioned retrieval mission, T'Ana assigns Tendi to locate and scan crew members who have not come in for their annual physicals. The anonymous last patient on this list turns out to be T'Ana herself, who had assumed Tendi would give up. Tendi manages to scan T'ana after a prolonged chase, earning the doctor's respect. The two later go rock climbing together on the holodeck in their free time. In the season finale, T'Ana, feeling that Tendi's abilities are wasted in sickbay, has her reassigned to senior science officer training.

==== Season 3 ====
The third season's premiere episode features Mariner, Boimler, Rutherford, and Tendi boarding the drydocked Cerritos without authorization as they search for evidence that will exonerate their captain—Mariner's mother Carol Freeman—from the destruction of the Pakled homeworld. This action proves unnecessary, as Freeman's court-martial was merely a cover that gave Starfleet time to uncover the truth.

In "The Least Dangerous Game", Tendi advises Boimler to be more assertive and open to new experiences. This advice leads to him attempting to reinvent himself as "Bold Boimler", which gets him into trouble throughout the season.

Tendi begins her senior science officer training in "Mining the Minds's Mines", but her assigned mentor turns out to be the ship's incompetent counselor, Dr. Migleemoo, who has no experience training science officers. Migleemoo instructs Tendi to stand up to the captain and act as the "voice of science" during a diplomatic negotiation. Tendi's initial attempts at this do not go well, and she seeks out T'Ana, who expresses confidence in her and tells her that there will be times when she needs to "risk screwing things up". This advice helps Tendi expose attempted espionage by the negotiators onboard.

"Hear All, Trust Nothing" sees the Cerritos visiting Deep Space Nine for trade negotiations with the Karemma. Tendi is initially excited to explore the station, but is made uncomfortable by another Orion Starfleet officer named Mesk, who constantly and obnoxiously references Orion piracy. Tendi and Rutherford are trapped on board the Karemma ship with Mesk when the Karemma disable Deep Space Nine, arrest Quark, and attempt to return to the Gamma Quadrant through the Bajoran wormhole. Faced with a situation in which Orion pirate skills would be useful, Mesk breaks down and admits that he was raised by humans and got his ideas about Orions from Federation media and stereotypes. Tendi, in turn, reveals that her family are members of the Orion Syndicate. Using her pirate skills, Tendi is able to take control of the Karemma ship long enough for Deep Space Nine to lock onto the vessel with a tractor beam.

During the Cerritos's "mission race" against the automated USS Aledo, Tendi halts construction of an outpost due to indications of sentient microbial life in the soil, which allows Aledo to take the lead. Tendi is initially dismayed that her observance of regulations led to the Cerritos's defeat and the probable replacement of the California-class with the automated Texas-class, but the incident causes Captain Freeman to realize that Aledo violated the Prime Directive. This leads to the revelation that Starfleet Admiral Buenamigo secretly used Rutherford's unstable AI (the same code that was used in Badgey) in the Texas-class, and the planned retirement of the California-class is called off after the entire California-class joins forces to defeat the rogue Texas-class ships. Tendi's actions impress Starfleet, leading them to transfer a new trainee science officer to the Cerritos—a Vulcan named T'Lyn—whom Tendi greets with great enthusiasm.

==== Season 4 ====
At the beginning of the fourth season, the Cerritos crew is assigned to help prepare the USS Voyager for display as a museum ship. However, a transporter accident leads to Dr. T'Ana and Cerritos chief engineer Andy Billups being merged into a single individual named T'illups, similarly to the Tuvix episode from Voyager. When T'illups learns of Captain Janeway's decision to forcibly separate a previous transporter hybrid, he begins capturing and "Tuvixing" other Cerritos crew members. The hybrids are stopped by T'Lyn, who accidentally combines them into a "non-sentient blob" using the transporter, but is able to separate them with Tendi's help. These actions earn Tendi and T'Lyn promotions to lieutenant junior grade, while Boimler and Mariner are promoted at the same time due to an incident aboard Voyager.

Rutherford sets out to gain a promotion and join his friends, running himself ragged in the process. Eventually, Tendi orders him to stand at attention and tells him that they will still be friends no matter what their ranks are. This leads Rutherford to admit he had turned down numerous promotions in the past so that rank difference wouldn't come between them. Hearing this, Tendi requests a promotion on Rutherford's behalf, which Lieutenant Commander Billups readily grants.

When Tendi reluctantly returns to Orion for her sister's wedding—accompanied by Mariner and T'Lyn—it is revealed that Tendi was born into a very wealthy and influential family. Tendi's mother orders her to locate her sister D'Erika, who has been kidnapped. The "kidnapping" turns out to be a ploy by D'Erika to lure her sister back to Orion. It is revealed that D'Vana was raised to be an assassin, but instead left to join Starfleet, forcing her sister to take her place. D'Erika does not feel that she can live up to her sister's example, and resents D'Vana for abandoning her. The sisters engage in a sword fight, which D'Erika wins, but they reconcile after D'Vana apologizes and says her sister was always better suited to be a Syndicate assassin. After jury-rigging a derelict ship, they arrive at D'Erika's wedding just in time. D'Vana is somewhat embarrassed of her privileged upbringing, but Mariner and T'Lyn assure her that she is defined by who she chooses to be rather than by her past.

During a visit to Ferenginar, Tendi and Rutherford are assigned to pose as newlyweds to help update Starfeet's travel guide for the planet, creating a great deal of awkwardness.

A mission to study moss in a cave leads Tendi, Rutherford, Mainer, and Boimler to reminisce about past adventures and renew their friendship despite their new responsibilities as lieutenants.

In the season finale, Tendi assists in the Cerritos's unauthorized mission to rescue Mariner from Nicholas Locarno. The crew attempts to obtain a warship from D'Erika, who is now overseeing her family's criminal empire, but the younger Tendi is reluctant to collaborate with the Federation. Eventually, D'Vana has to promise to return to Orion. Despite D'Erika giving them a non-functional battleship, the Cerritos crew is able to rescue Mariner. D'Vana leaves to rejoin her sister, telling her friends that it is something she has to do.

Tendi spends much of the season attempting to become friends with T'Lyn, though her enthusiastic demeanor conflicts with the Vulcan's more reserved one. T'Lyn does eventually agree to become Tendi's "science bestie", unfortunately just as Tendi has to leave the Cerritos.

==== Season 5 ====
Tendi begins the fifth season of Lower Decks acting as a pirate under her sister's command, though she does her best to avoid inflicting serious harm on others. A conflict breaks out between her family and the "Blue Orions" (depicted in the Star Trek: The Animated Series episode "The Pirates of Orion"), and Tendi remains behind to assist despite her sister offering her the chance to return to Starfleet. The Orion Syndicate orders the two competing factions to settle their dispute through a dangerous race using solar sail ships, but Tendi—who has learned that D'Erika is pregnant by accessing her private logs—hinders her team's performance attempting to keep her sister out of harm's way. D'Erika eventually reveals that she kept her pregnancy hidden because Orion law would require D'Vana to remain on Orion to train her niece as the new Mistress of the Winter Constellations. The two sisters reconcile, and Tendi attempts to resolve the conflict with the Blue Orions by destroying the treasure that had been the objective of the race, though this results in the Syndicate seizing the assets of both families. Tendi returns to the Cerritos, where Captain Freeman agrees to hand over the material wealth of a planet transitioning to a post-scarcity society to D'Erika, restoring the Tendi family's wealth.

Tendi's return is a great relief to Rutherford, who had not been coping well with her absence. She participates in several missions during the season, eventually applying to be Cerritos's senior science officer along with T'Lyn. Tendi attempts to compete with T'Lyn while they (along with Mariner and a version of Data from an alternate universe) experience a year on a planet experiencing time dilation, gradually descending into paranoia and resentment. Tendi finally reconciles with T'Lyn, and upon their return to Cerritos, Captain Freeman appoints them as co-senior science officers at the suggestion of the alternate Data.

In this role, Tendi assists in Cerritos's attempt to neutralize a dangerous anomaly that threatens to destroy their universe. Tendi's coordination with T'Lyn proves crucial when the Cerritos is briefly separated into two separate but interlinked versions of itself. The Cerritos manages to stabilize the anomaly, turning it into a portal to other quantum realities. Captain Freeman is reassigned to oversee the portal, with Tendi and the crew of the Cerritos, now led by former first officer Jack Ransom, continuing on toward new adventures.

=== Future ===
Noël Wells has expressed openness to portraying Tendi in live-action in the future, especially if she could do so without makeup.

== Reception ==
Tendi's character has been praised for adding more depth to Orion culture, moving them beyond the "slave girl" trope or simply being slavers and pirates. Writing for Screen Rant, John Orquiola said that "with Ensign Tendi, Star Trek: Lower Decks showcases an Orion female who isn't purely an object of male sexual gratification at last". Orquiola also called Tendi's characterization "refreshing and a long-awaited way for Star Trek to present a female Orion character".
