= Brad Boimler =

Fictional character from the Star Trek franchise

- Star Trek: Lower Decks character
- Brad Boimler in Star Trek: Lower Decks
- First appearance: "Second Contact" (2020); Star Trek: Lower Decks
- Created by: Mike McMahan
- Voiced by: Jack Quaid
- Portrayed by: Jack Quaid

In-universe information
- Full name: Bradward Boimler; William Boimler (transporter clone)
- Nickname: Brad
- Species: Human
- Gender: Male
- Title(s): Lieutenant junior grade Captain (transporter clone)
- Occupation: Starfleet officer Section 31 officer (transporter clone)
- Origin: Earth (Modesto, CA)

Bradward "Brad" Boimler (/ˈbɔɪmlər/) is a fictional character from the American science fiction television series Star Trek: Lower Decks. He is known for being ambitious while diligently following the rules of the service, and pleading excessively for his best friend, Ensign Beckett Mariner, an openly insubordinate ensign who regularly skirts the consequences, to do the same—although in the far future, Boimler is remembered for the Boimler Effect, a ship-wide mandate aboard the USS Cerritos encouraging breaking the rules, a distinction Boimler would not approve of. However, as the series progresses, Boimler eventually distinguishes himself as a courageous and resourceful officer of considerable command potential.

Boimler is voiced by Jack Quaid, who also reprises the role in a live-action crossover in "Those Old Scientists", an episode of the 2023 second season of Star Trek: Strange New Worlds.

== Characterization ==
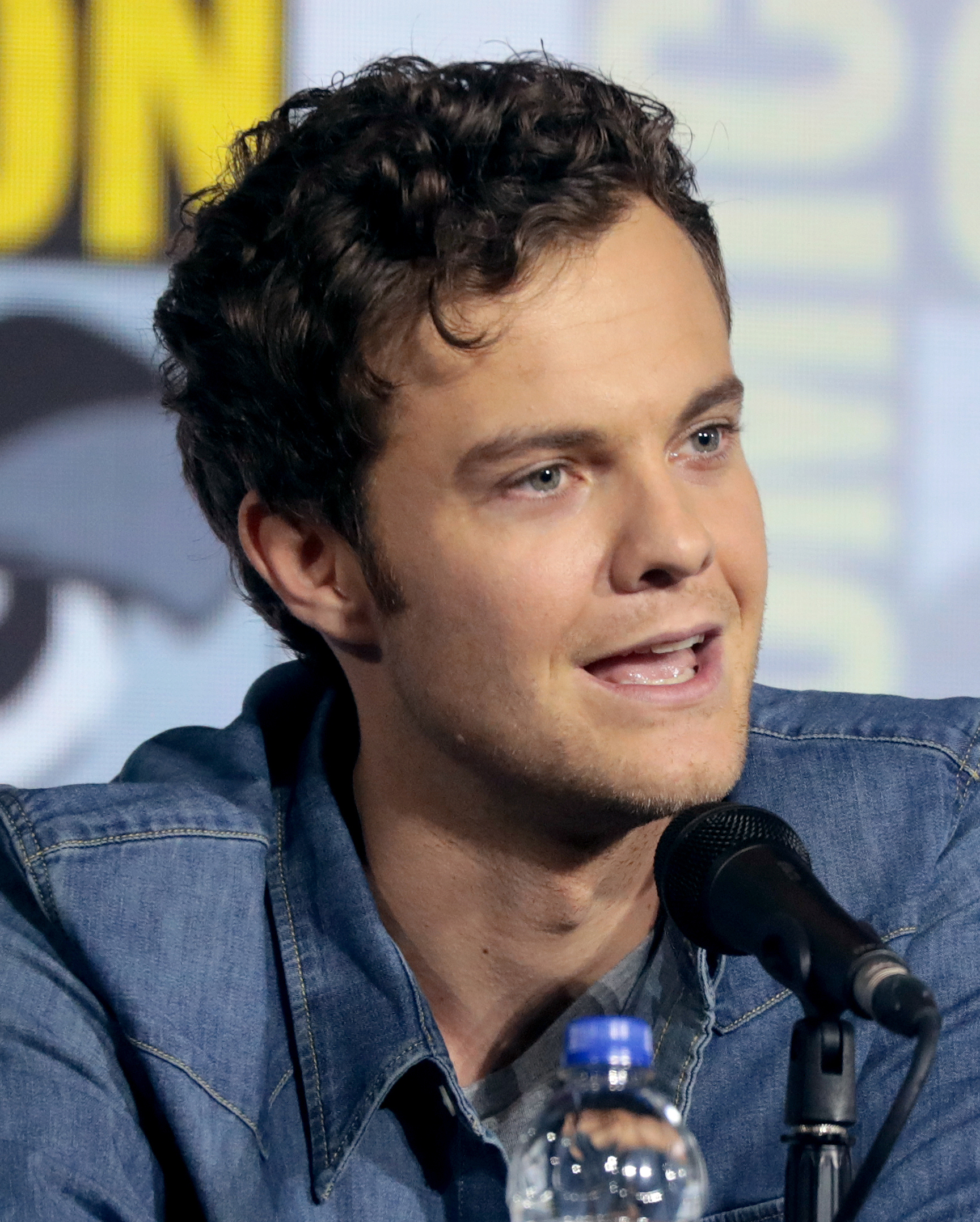
Jack Quaid, the voice of Brad Boimler

Boimler has been described as the kind of person who does "everything by the book" and "a total stickler." About the character, Quaid noted that Boimler would "nail the written portion of the driving test with flying colors but once it actually got to him being in the car, it would be a complete and total disaster." Quaid additionally called Boimler the direct opposite of friend Beckett Mariner. According to Variety, "while great at sci-fi stuff, he's completely bound to the rules. He doesn't know how to follow his gut, and if he wants to be a captain some day he's going to have to learn how to improvise." Quaid also originally auditioned for the role of Sam Rutherford, but was cast as Boimler. Brad Boimler has also been likened to Quaid's character on the Amazon Prime Video original series The Boys, Hughie.

== Fictional biography ==
=== Lower Decks ===
==== Season 1 ====
In the beginning of season one, Boimler is tasked with keeping his friend and co-worker Beckett Mariner in check by the USS Cerritos captain Carol Freeman, who, unbeknownst to him, is Mariner's mother. He sees his friend smuggling supplies to a pair of poor farmers down on a planet the Cerritos is making second contact with, and so he must decide to either follow the rules and report Mariner's behavior or break the rules like Mariner and do what's right. In the end, Boimler decides not to help Mariner but also not to report her.

For most of the rest of the season, Boimler tries to do both and impress the bridge crew while he's at it. However, though he and Mariner remain friends, he slowly starts to grow resentful of her constant rule breaking and that it always gets the job done anyway. In episode two, "Envoys", Boimler even considers quitting Starfleet when Mariner navigates a foreign planet much better than him, but Mariner hires an alien impostor and fakes a threat for Boimler to overcome, restoring some of his confidence. Over the rest of the season, the two develop an uneasy friendship, though Boimler remains determined to advance in Starfleet and tries to maintain a spotless record, despite getting embroiled in Mariner's antics.

In the season finale, "No Small Parts", Boimler tells Mariner he has learned she is Freeman's daughter, unwittingly broadcasting this to the crew and making the secret public. This upsets Mariner's relationship with the rest of the crew and with Boimler, but following a crisis that almost destroys the ship, Boimler embraces life in the lower decks with Mariner, declaring her his best friend. Shortly after, he seizes an opportunity for promotion that Mariner rejected and is reassigned to the USS Titan, serving on the bridge under the command of William Riker (from Star Trek: The Next Generation), leaving Mariner furious and ignoring her calls.

==== Season 2 ====
In season two, Boimler is still an officer aboard the USS Titan under Captain Riker, although he finds the crew's dangerous missions trying. After an adventure with his crew mates on the Titan that allows him to truly realize what being in Starfleet is all about, Boimler is accidentally cloned in a transporter accident, and Riker sends the original back to the Cerritos, with the clone Boimler opting to stay and work on the Titan, taking the new forename William. Boimler is welcomed back with open arms, though Mariner remains a little resistant. As a part of his return to the Cerritos, Boimler is demoted back to ensign.

Despite this career setback and his personal foibles, Boimler's formative experiences soon assisted him in distinguishing himself on the Cerritos as an officer of considerable talent and command potential, such as dealing with a Ferengi Mugato poaching operation by presenting a persuasive counter-proposal to convert it into a legal wildlife preserve, and later outwitting a malevolent artificial intelligence. Furthermore, Boimler gained the attention of a clique of ambitious ensigns called The Redshirts who aspired to emulate notable Starfleet captains to accelerate promotion. Although Boimler impressed them emulating Captain Riker's inspirational oratory, he caused it to dissolve by his good example of his proper attitude as a Starfleet officer. This happened when he objected to their haughty dismissal of his friends and when he impressed the ship's senior command with an unorthodox but effective solution concerning a comrade changed into a dangerous monster by publicly humiliating himself to amuse her enough to change back to normal.

==== Season 3 ====
Boimler is revealed to be of a family of raisin farmers, a family profession which he dislikes with such intensity that the fact that numerous comely female co-workers on the farm continually propositioning him is of no interest. In addition, his career advances in subtle ways, such as when he was assigned with Mariner to a Starfleet recruitment booth at a local event, a task made more difficult being surrounded by other organizations that openly hold the officers in derisive contempt. When the abuse extends to having his uniform's rank pip dislodged and stepped on, Boimler goes into a violent tantrum in response, which inadvertently sparks considerable recruitment interest in a service that can inspire such confidence in their members. While Boimler is officially reprimanded for the incident and sent to the brig, his First Officer privately commends him for his defense of Starfleet. Boimler later falls into a depression after learning that his transporter clone William had died in a freak accident on the Titan, leading to Boimler searching for the meaning of life. Unbeknownst to anyone, William's death was faked by Section 31 so that he could join the shadowy organization.

==== Season 4 ====
Boimler is promoted to Lieutenant Junior Grade along with his compatriots. The prospect of that promotion caused some momentary personal difficulties jeopardizing it as his regretful memories of how Mariner felt betrayed by his previous promotion caused him to make major mistakes during a mission to transport the decommissioned USS Voyager leading to the worsening of a crisis. However, Mariner, upon learning of Boimler's concerns, informed him that she recommended his promotion and he deserved it. With that encouragement, Boimler played a major role in resolving the situation. As such, his promotion was approved and he moved into shared quarters with the belatedly promoted Sam Rutherford who solved his accommodation difficulties. However, his first field command on a ringworld proves to be a daunting task with him quietly unwilling to order his immediate subordinates to handle dangerous materials to the point of doing it all himself against standard procedure. When the situation escalates on the ringworld into a crisis and Boimler's inefficiency becomes a serious liability, Boimler confesses to Lt. Jr grade T'Lyn that he did not feel comfortable assigning potentially dangerous duty to personnel whom he shared the ensign rank with just the previous week. T'Lyn responds that she knows that Boimler has truly earned his rank and should exercise his proper authority in the situation. With that affirmation, Boimler does so and his team help resolves the crisis, although he orders them to get clear while he does the final and most dangerous duty himself. Furthermore, while the crew of the Cerritos dealt with the disgraced former-Starfleet Academy cadet, Nicholas Locarno's, insurrection, Boimler was placed in temporary command of the ship to guide a giant derelict Orion ship to ram penetrate a powerful containment field, creating a breach large and lingering enough for the command crew of the Cerritos to enter using the Captain's Yacht.

==== Season 5 ====
A year later, the Cerritos has been assigned to close mysterious interdimensional rifts that keep popping up, resulting in the ship falling through one and the crew meeting their counterparts from an alternate universe. In the alternate universe, Boimler who is dubbed "Beard Boimler," has a full beard, is far more confident and successful, and has been acting captain of the ship multiple times. Boimler becomes obsessed with imitating his counterpart in order to achieve the same success, stealing Beard Boimler's PADD, studying it, and growing his own beard. Boimler's efforts meet with mixed success with his friends trying to convince Boimler to be his own person instead. One of Boimler's achievements during this time is successfully befriending the foul-mouthed and bad tempered Doctor T'Ana. Boimler also helps friendly Klingon captain Ma'ah to regain his standing and take down an abusive superior. However, on the flip side, Boimler's antics create a transporter mishap that strands Mariner, Tendi and T'Lyn on another planet for a year of relative time.

In the penultimate episode of the series, Boimler's transporter clone William returns, having been promoted to captain of a Section 31 Defiant-class starship, the Anaximander. William's mission is to investigate the rifts, find the source of them, and stop it with his crew being alternate versions of T'Pol, Curzon Dax, Elim Garak, Julian Bashir and multiple Harry Kims that the Anaximander rescued after they fell through various rifts and got stranded. After rescuing a version of Mariner who is an engineering officer in her universe, the Anaximander tracks the source of the rifts an exploratory ship named the Beagle captained by Lily Sloane, the woman who had helped Zephram Cochrane to create the warp drive. In her universe, Lily and Cochrane had created the quantum reality drive instead which Lily and her crew were using to explore the multiverse. The rifts were an unintentional side effect of the drive's usage, not a diabolical plan as was previously believed with the Beagle crew being completely unaware of them. Lily agrees to help the Anaximander crew return to their home universes, but her ship is hijacked by a deranged Harry Kim variant who kidnaps his counterparts to return to his own universe with all of them. After his counterparts fight back, Kim beams them to the Anaximander, but ignores warnings that the damaged ship will not survive the trip. The explosion of the Beagle destabilizes the rift, threatening the multiverse with destructive energy waves. William has Lily direct the wave to the prime universe, sending Brad a message warning him of the danger and trusting his counterpart and his friends on the Cerritos to find a solution in time to save the universe.

In the series finale, the warning from William Boimler allows the Cerritos to intercept the rift while being chased by Klingons. The conflict with the Klingons causes Boimler to destroy his counterpart's computer in favor of his friendship with Mariner. Although the Cerritos is unable to close the rift, Mariner creates a dam that contains the destructive energy at the cost of the rift remaining permanently open. Starfleet decides to begin a mission of multiversal exploration based out of Starbase 80 and commanded by Freeman. The Anaximander and William Boimler's interdimensional crew return to the prime universe, where they are stationed at Starbase 80 to take part in the new mission. On the Cerritos, Boimler and Mariner are both promoted to provisional first officer by the newly-promoted Captain Jack Ransom.

=== Strange New Worlds ===
Quaid, along with Tawny Newsome as Beckett Mariner, makes a live-action appearance as Brad Boimler in the second season of Star Trek: Strange New Worlds, in which he is accidentally sent back in time and meets Christopher Pike and Spock. These events take place during season 3 of Lower Decks.

== Reception ==
Brad Boimler has been a generally well-received character. Author Jodi L. Milner reviewed the series, and in the article she noted that the character is "desperate to get into command to the point that he will literally do anything to gain attention." Alan Sepinwall, writing for Rolling Stone, called Boimler "an easily flustered try-hard who doesn't understand why his rigorous rule following goes ignored by Captain Carol Freeman."
