= Tawny Newsome =

American actress, musician, comedian, and writer

- Newsome at Dragon Con in 2026
- Born: Vacaville, California, United States
- Education: DePaul University (BFA)
- Occupations: Musician, actress, comedian, writer, podcaster
- Years active: 2008–present
- Spouse: Nate Urbansky (m. 2013)
- Website: tawnynewsome.com

Tawny Newsome is an American actress, musician, comedian, and writer best known for playing Chelsea Leight-Leigh on Bajillion Dollar Propertie$, co-starring in Space Force and the third season of Brockmire, and co-hosting the podcast Yo, Is This Racist?. She is also a singer in the band Four Lost Souls. She voiced one of the main characters, Beckett Mariner, on Star Trek: Lower Decks and has recently appeared in Starfleet Academy as Professor Illa Dax, a new host of the Dax Symbiont.

== Early life ==
Tawny Newsome was born in Vacaville, California to a biracial couple and grew up on a ranch that her mother still lives on. As a teenager she was a Junior Rodeo champion. Newsome attended the DePaul Theatre School in Chicago. After graduating she became a regular performer in Chicago Theatre. Newsome was a member of The Second City from 2013-2014.

== Career ==
Newsome was a backup singer in a touring Talking Heads tribute band. This later led to her being cast in Documentary Now! in a similar role.

Newsome's first major television roles were as Chelsea Leight-Leigh on Bajillion Dollar Propertie$ and Nina on The Comedy Get Down.

Newsome has been a co-host of the podcast Yo, Is This Racist? alongside Andrew Ti since 2018. She also appears as a frequent guest on podcasts such as Comedy Bang! Bang! and Spontaneanation with Paul F. Tompkins.

Newsome is also a musician and is a member of the band Four Lost Souls alongside Jon Langford, Bethany Thomas, and John Szymanski. The group released a debut self-titled album in 2017.

Newsome was in the main cast of Brockmire in its third season. She was also cast in the 2019 ABC pilot Woman Up. She was cast as a lead voice in the CBS All Access series Star Trek: Lower Decks.

She appeared in a lead role as Maj. Angela Ali in the Netflix series Space Force starting in 2020.

Since 2020, Newsome has co-hosted Star Trek: The Pod Directive, the official Star Trek podcast, along with comedian Paul F. Tompkins.

== Personal life ==
Since 2020, Newsome and her husband have lived in Southern California.

She is a Trekkie.

== Filmography ==
=== As actor ===
==== Film roles ====
Year	Title	Role	Notes
2015	Uncle John	Cute Hipster Girl	
2016	Einstein's God Model	Marcel Gutierrez	
2018	Canal Street	Kai	
2019	Spies in Disguise	Agency Employee #1	Voice
2021	How It Ends	Celine	
2021	Vacation Friends	Brooke	
2023	Quiz Lady	Mercedes	

==== Television roles ====
Year	Title	Role	Notes
2013	Chicago Fire	Jen	Episode: "A Problem House"
2014	Crisis	EMT	Episode: "Best Laid Plans"
2015	Sirens	Jami	Episode: "Balls"
2016	2 Broke Girls	Chrissy	Episode: "And the Basketball Jones"
2016	Comedy Bang! Bang!	Worried Mom	Episode: "Zach Galifianakis Wears Rolled Khakis and Shoes with Brown Laces"
2016	Take My Wife	Pam	Episode: "Punchline"
2016	Documentary Now!	Backup Singer	Episode: "Final Transmission"
2016–2019	Bajillion Dollar Propertie$	Chelsea Leight-Leigh	34 episodes
2017	Nobodies	Grace	3 episodes
2017	The Carmichael Show	Jessica	Episode: "Three Year Anniversary"
2017	Do You Want to See a Dead Body?	Marion	Episode: "A Body and a High School Reunion (with Joe Lo Truglio)"
2017	The Comedy Get Down	Nina	10 episodes
2019	Brockmire	Gabby Taylor	6 episodes
2019	The New Negroes with Baron Vaughn and Open Mike Eagle	Performer	Episode: "Money"
2019	HarmonQuest	Donna (voice) / Herself	Episode: "Ivory Quay"
2019	Big Mouth	(voice)	Episode: "Duke"
2019	Perfect Harmony	Georgia	3 episodes
2019–2020	Craig of the Creek	Jasmine Williams (voice)	3 episodes
2019–2022	Sherman's Showcase	Various	5 episodes
2020	Superstore	Isabel	Episode: "Zephra Cares"
2020	The Twilight Zone	Zara Delancey	Episode: "Ovation"
2020	Aunty Donna's Big Ol' House of Fun	The Queen	Episode: "Dinner Party"
2020–2022	Space Force	Angela Ali	Main role
2020–2024	Star Trek: Lower Decks	Ensign/LtJG Beckett Mariner (voice)	Main role, 5 seasons Nominated—Critics' Choice Super Award for Best Voice Actress in an Animated Series (2021)
2021	True Story	Billie	6 episodes
2022	Physical	Wanda	5 episodes
2022	Tuca & Bertie	(voice)	Episode: "Leveling Up"
2022	Murderville	Mayor Palmer	Episode: "Who Killed Santa? A Murderville Murder Mystery"
2023	Star Trek: Strange New Worlds	Ensign Beckett Mariner	Episode: "Those Old Scientists"
2025	The Paper	Harper Brewster	Episode: "The Five W's"
2026	Star Trek: Starfleet Academy	Illa Dax	Episode: "Series Acclimation Mil"

=== As writer ===
Television roles
Year	Title	Role	Notes
2026-	Star Trek: Starfleet Academy	Writer, co-producer	Writer: "Series Acclimation Mil"
TBA	Untitled Star Trek comedy series	Co-creator	With Alex Kurtzman and Justin Simien
