= List of Star Trek: Lower Decks characters =

Star Trek: Lower Decks is an American adult animated television series created by Mike McMahan for the streaming service Paramount+. It is the ninth series in the Star Trek franchise, and was launched in 2020 as part of executive producer Alex Kurtzman's expansion of the franchise. Lower Decks is the first animated series created for All Access, and the first animated Star Trek series since the 1973–74 series Star Trek: The Animated Series. It follows the support crew of the U.S.S. Cerritos in the year 2380.

Tawny Newsome, Jack Quaid, Noël Wells, and Eugene Cordero voice "lower decks" crew members of the Cerritos, with Dawnn Lewis, Jerry O'Connell, Fred Tatasciore, and Gillian Vigman also starring as the ship's senior officers. Characters seen previously in Star Trek also appear, including John de Lancie as Q, Jonathan Frakes as William Riker, and Marina Sirtis as Deanna Troi. The following list includes the main cast of Lower Decks, all guest characters with recurring roles, and a supplementary list of other noteworthy guests.

== Overview ==
= Main cast (credited main cast member)
= Recurring cast (3+ appearances in a season)
= Guest cast (1–2 appearances per season)

Actor	Character	Seasons				
Actor	Character	1	2	3	4	5
Main cast
Tawny Newsome	Beckett Mariner	Main	Main	Main	Main	Main
Jack Quaid	Brad Boimler	Main (Note: In the second-season episode "Kayshon, His Eyes Open", Brad Boimler is duplicated by a transporter malfunction while serving on the USS Titan, the original Boimler is tricked by the duplicate Boimler into returning to the Cerritos, and the duplicate Boimler takes on the new name William Boimler (after the Titan's captain, William Riker) and remains onboard the Titan, before faking his death to become an agent of Section 31.)	Main	Main	Main	Main
Jack Quaid	William Boimler		Main	Main		Main
Noël Wells	D'Vana Tendi	Main	Main	Main	Main	Main
Eugene Cordero	Sam Rutherford	Main (Note: In the third-season episode "Reflections", Samanthan "Sam" Rutherford's implant is revealed to have been altered to suppress his true personality and memories as "Red" Rutherford", an angry first-year recruit in Starfleet who had been working on a secret project with shadowy Starfleet higher-ups before being imprisoned within his own mind, all memories of their own mysterious activities erased.)	Main	Main	Main	Main
Eugene Cordero	Red Rutherford			Main		
Dawnn Lewis	Carol Freeman	Main	Main	Main	Main	Main
Jerry O'Connell	Jack Ransom	Main	Main	Main	Main	Main
Fred Tatasciore	Shaxs	Main	Main	Main	Main	Main
Gillian Vigman	T'Ana	Main	Main	Main	Main	Main
Gabrielle Ruiz	T'Lyn		Guest	Guest	Also starring	Also starring
Recurring cast
Paul Scheer	Andy Billups	Recurring	Recurring	Recurring	Recurring	Recurring
Jessica McKenna	Barnes	Recurring	Recurring	Recurring	Recurring	Recurring
Ben Rodgers	Steve Stevens	Recurring	Recurring	Guest		Guest
Lauren Lapkus	Jennifer Sh'reyan	Guest	Recurring	Recurring		Guest
Phil LaMarr	Alonzo Freeman	Guest	Recurring	Recurring	Guest	Guest
Carl Tart	Kayshon		Recurring	Recurring	Recurring	Recurring
Paul F. Tompkins	Gabers Migleemo	Guest	Guest	Recurring	Recurring	Guest
Carlos Alazraqui	Les Buenamigo			Recurring		
Georgia King	Petra Aberdeen			Recurring		
Special guests and legacy characters
Jonathan Frakes	William Riker	Special guest	Special guest			
John de Lancie	Q	Special guest				
Marina Sirtis	Deanna Troi	Special guest				
Robert Duncan McNeill	Tom Paris		Special guest			
Robert Duncan McNeill	Nick Locarno				Guest	
Jeffrey Combs	AGIMUS		Special guest	Special guest	Special guest	
Alice Krige	Borg Queen		Guest			
Lycia Naff	Sonya Gomez		Guest			
Armin Shimerman	Quark			Special guest		
Nana Visitor	Kira Nerys			Special guest		
George Takei	Hikaru Sulu			Special guest		
James Cromwell	Zefram Cochrane			Guest		
J.G. Hertzler	Martok			Guest		
Susan Gibney	Leah Brahms			Guest		
Max Grodénchik	Rom				Special guest	
Chase Masterson	Leeta				Special guest	
Wil Wheaton	Wesley Crusher				Special guest	
Shannon Fill	Sito Jaxa				Guest	
Brent Spiner	Data					Special Guest
Jolene Blalock (Note: Credited mononymously as "Jolene".)	T'Pol					Special Guest
Andrew J. Robinson	Elim Garak					Special Guest
Alexander Siddig	Julian Bashir					Special Guest
Garrett Wang	Harry Kim					Special Guest
Alfre Woodard	Lily Sloane					Special Guest

== Main characters ==
=== Mariner ===
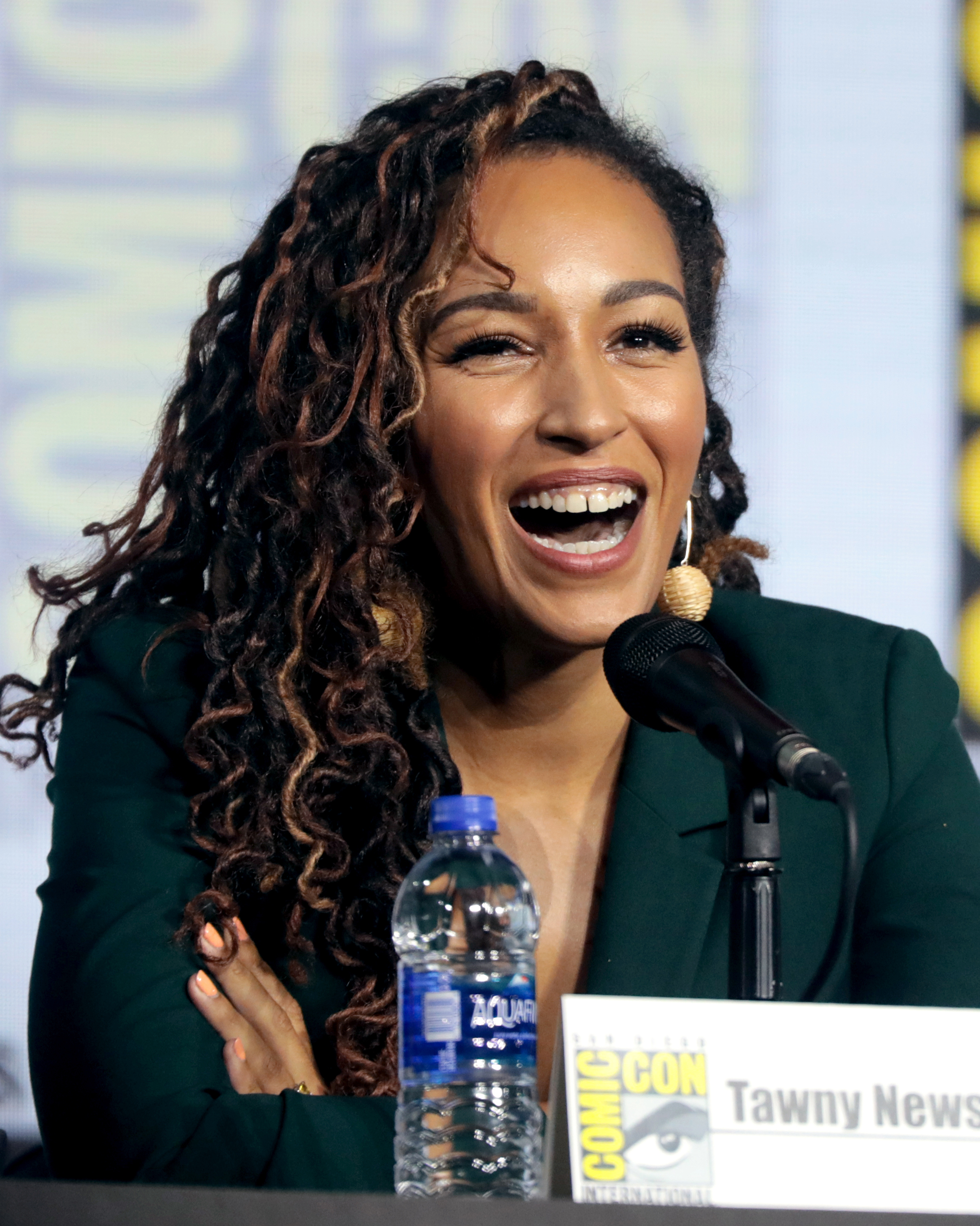
Tawny Newsome voices Mariner.

Beckett Mariner Freeman (voiced by Tawny Newsome) is a human ensign aboard the U.S.S. Cerritos and the daughter of Captain Freeman. Newsome described the character as irreverent and a rule-breaker, though she is actually "very good at all things Starfleet, she just doesn't care" and has been demoted several times. Newsome added that Mariner "just wants to ride her skateboard and eat her piece of pizza in peace, man." Mike McMahan confirmed that Captain Amina Ramsey was her former lover at Starfleet Academy. The namesake for Mariner is McMahan's own sister, Beckett Mariner McMahan. In June 2019, McMahan hinted that Lower Decks would feature mainly original characters. The next month, Tawny Newsome was cast as Beckett Mariner, one of those new characters. As for the second season, McMahan also felt the writers did not adequately address LGBTQ characters and relationships in the first season, especially since it was their intention to portray Mariner as bisexual which is never made explicit. He said the second season would address this better. Sometime between the end of Season 2 and Season 3 she begins a relationship with Andorian officer Jennifer Sh'reyan. However, they break up due to a misunderstanding during Mariner's unauthorized interview with Victoria Nuzé. In the end of the Season 3 finale, Mariner shows no signs of getting back with Jennifer. In season 4, Mariner was promoted to Lieutenant Jr. Grade.

For much of the first season, when production was impacted due to the COVID-19 pandemic, Newsome recorded her lines in a recording studio set up at her house. Newsome began recording voice overs for the season in early June, in a recording studio which was not possible in the previous season due to the pandemic. She was unable to record with Quaid, as she did on the first season, due to his commitments filming The Boys.

In the first season of the series, Mariner wants to keep her relation with Captain Freeman a secret. In the second episode, "Envoys", Mariner is revealed to be the long-time friend of K'orin, a Klingon warrior. She convinces Boimler to stay at Starfleet after K'orin ditches them on another planet and Boimler cannot survive on his own in the environment. When Freeman wants Mariner transferred to another ship in "Moist Vessel", the captain gives Mariner continually harder and harder jobs, hoping she will grow bored and tired of the constant work and give up, then transfer herself. In the next episode, Mariner attempts to convince Boimler that his new girlfriend, Barbara, is an evil alien masquerading as a human to seduce and cause harm to him, but instead the two find they have much in common and become friends. In the season finale, Boimler inadvertently reveals to the whole crew Mariner's connection to Freeman, but the mother and daughter make amends and reconnect.

In the third season, Mariner's mother is arrested and Mariner is determined to clear her name, including hijacking the drydocked Cerritos, but it turned out to be unnecessary since her mother's arrest was actually part of a Starfleet Security sting to expose a criminal conspiracy. Regardless of her intentions, Captain Freeman decides that she has been too lenient to her daughter and puts her on a strict probationary status under First Officer Ransom's command with full authority to have her dishonorably discharged if she ever disobeys him. Although enduring the senior officer's eccentric priorities is frustrating through this period, Commander Ransom is eventually satisfied that Mariner has shown satisfactory performance to allow the probation to lift.

However, when the Cerritos hosts a reporter while on Operation: Swing By, a followup mission with planets visited previously, Captain Freeman is met with hostile questions in her own interview about embarrassing previous incidents of the ship's mission and assumes that Mariner had revealed them in a previous interview made without her authorization. Incensed, a sentiment shared by the crew outside of Mariner's closest friends, the Captain reassigns Mariner to Starbase 80, only to discover to her profound chagrin that Mariner's actual testimony was the only interview unambiguously positive while the rest of the crew was actually responsible for carelessly admitting the embarrassing facts in their own interview (Kayshon's revelation about having lived in a cave before was brought up as a result of the reporter's difficulty in understanding his people's allegorical speech, while Ransom got flirtatious during his interview.). In response, Mariner resigns her commission and joins a rogue archeologist in her treasure hunting. However, she soon finds that she values Starfleet's ideals and returns to save her mother's ship from an out of control Starfleet autonomous vehicle with the rest of the California class fleet. With that, Mariner is reinstated and welcomed back into Starfleet, while forgiving her mother while declaring that she now wants to seriously advance in the ranks as an officer.

Mariner appears in a crossover with Star Trek: Strange New Worlds, "Those Old Scientists", where she and Boimler are accidentally sent back in time and meet the crew of the USS Enterprise. As Strange New Worlds is a live-action show, Tawny Newsome portrays a live-action version of Mariner alongside Jack Quaid playing a live action version of Boimler.

In season 4, Mariner is promoted to lieutenant junior grade alongside the rest of her friends and goes on a self-destructive spiral throughout the season. Mariner eventually admits to the Klingon warrior Ma'ah that she was close friends with Sito Jaxa who had died on a top-secret mission, leaving Mariner suffering from intense survivor's guilt, leading to her self-destructive behavior. Ma'ah inspires Mariner to finally begin moving forward with her life just before she is abducted by Nick Locarno who tries to get Mariner to inspire other lower deckers to rebel against their superior officers. Instead, Mariner stands up to Locarno and plays a major role in his defeat before being rescued by her mother and the other senior officers of the Cerritos.

In season 5, Mariner has finally fully accepted her promotion and her role on the ship and enjoys away missions, showing a much-improved attitude. Seeing a kindred spirit in young ensign Olly, Mariner takes Olly under her wing rather than letting her be booted out of Starfleet. Olly ironically mirrors Mariner in many ways, including her former attitude and stated love of the brig. However, Mariner recognizes her potential when no one else does and gets Olly an engineering position on the Cerritos. At the end of the series with Captain Freeman's reassignment and Ransom promoted to Captain, Mariner is assigned as provisional First Officer along with Boimler to have them compete for the permanent position.

=== Boimler ===
==== Brad Boimler ====
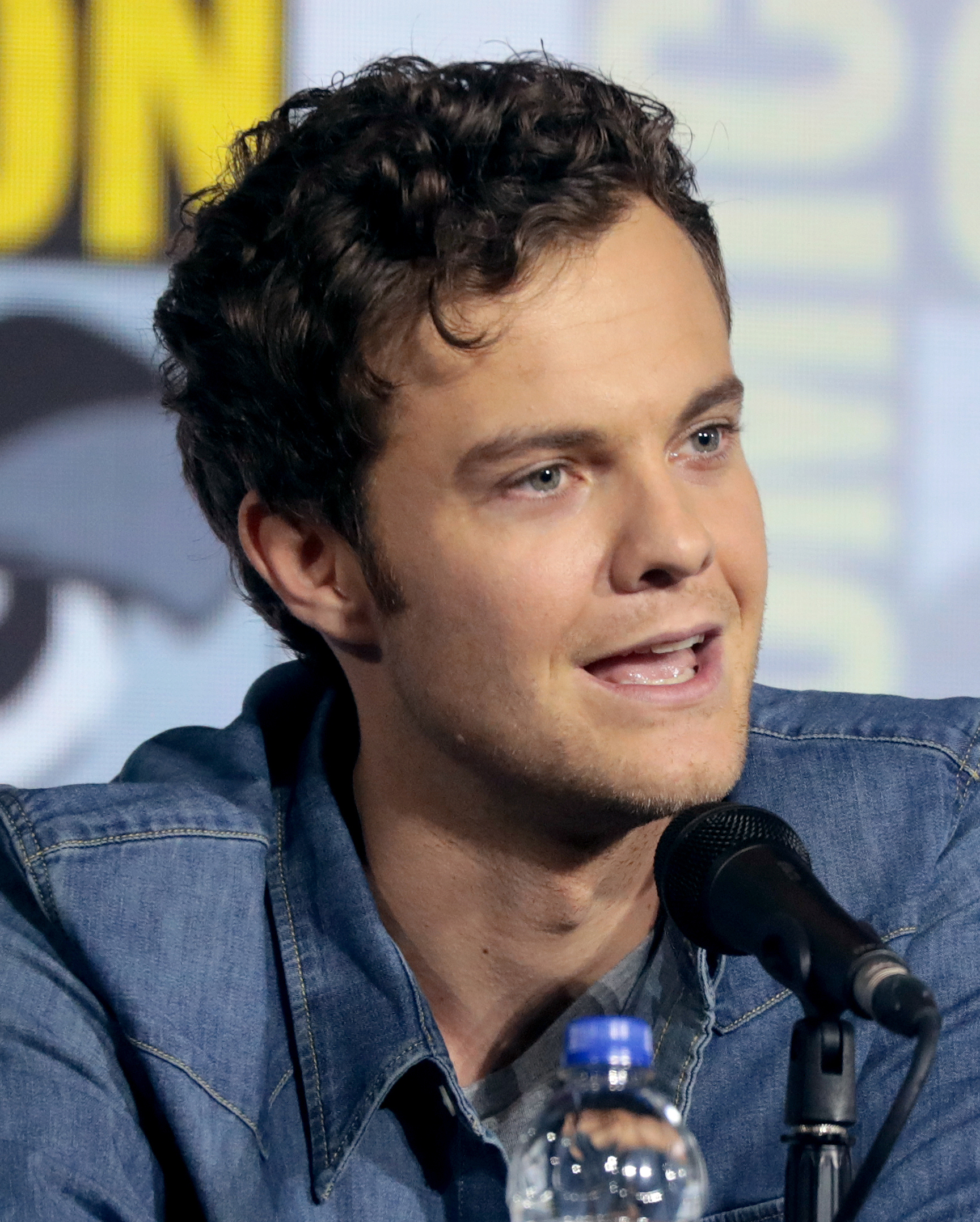
Jack Quaid voices Brad Boimler.

Bradward "Brad" Boimler (voiced by Jack Quaid) is a human ensign aboard the Cerritos, Boimler is a stickler for the rules and will need to learn how to improvise if he is to become a captain one day. Quaid described the character by saying "he would nail the written portion of the driving test with flying colors but once it actually got to him being in the car, it would be a complete and total disaster." Quaid originally auditioned for the role of Rutherford. Quaid additionally called Boimler the direct opposite of friend Beckett Mariner. According to Variety, "while great at sci-fi stuff, he's completely bound to the rules. He doesn't know how to follow his gut, and if he wants to be a captain some day he's going to have to learn how to improvise." Brad Boimler has also been likened to Quaid's character on the Amazon Prime Video original series The Boys, Hughie. Rolling Stone called Boimler "easily flustered try-hard who doesn't understand why his rigorous rule following goes ignored by Captain Carol Freeman" but liked the character nonetheless. In July 2019, Quaid was cast as Boimler.

In the beginning of season one, Boimler is tasked with keeping his friend and co-worker Beckett Mariner in check by the USS Cerritos captain Carol Freeman, who, unbeknownst to him, is Mariner's mother. He sees his friend smuggling supplies to a pair of poor farmer down on a planet the Cerritos is making second contact to, and so he must decide to either follow the rules and report Mariner's behavior or break the rules like Mariner and do what's right. In the end, Boimler decides not to help Mariner but also not to report her. At the end of the first season, after discovering that Mariner is actually the daughter of Captain Freeman, he gets transferred to the USS Titan, serving under Captain William Riker, much to Mariner's dismay. With the inadvertent creation of his clone, William Boimler, Brad is returned with a demotion to the Cerritos, but soon begins to distinguish himself as an officer of considerable talent and command potential. In season 4, Boimler was promoted to Lieutenant Jr. Grade in the Cerritos. In season 5, after meeting an accomplished interdimensional version himself, Boimler gains a PADD of that version and strives to emulate him, most notably growing a beard. At the end of the series, the newly promoted Captain Ransom appoints Boimler Provisional First Officer with Mariner to have them compete for the permanent position.

==== William Boimler ====
In the second-season episode "Kayshon, His Eyes Open", Boimler is duplicated by a transporter malfunction, and is assigned back to the Cerritos while the duplicated Boimler remains on board the Titan and takes on the new name William Boimler after William Riker. He later fakes his death in the third-season episode, "Crisis Point 2: Paradoxus," to join Starfleet's Section 31. William returns in the penultimate episode of the series "Fissure Quest." Having been promoted to captain, William commands the Section 31 Defiant-class ship Anaximander which searches for the source of a series of mysterious interdimensional rifts in order to stop them. William's crew consists of alternate reality versions of T'Pol, Elim Garak, Julian Bashir, Curzon Dax, Harry Kim, and later a Beckett Mariner, all of whom fell through various rifts and were rescued by William's ship. William and his crew discover the source to be an interdimensional exploratory vessel commanded by Lily Sloane, but the actions of a deranged Kim variant leave the multiverse in danger of destruction. William has the energy wave pushed to his own universe and sends a warning message to his counterpart, trusting Brad and his old friends on the Cerritos to find a solution.

=== Tendi ===
D'Vana Tendi (voiced by Noël Wells) is an Orion ensign in the medical bay aboard the Cerritos, Tendi is a big fan of Starfleet, who is always thrilled to be working on a starship. She is new to the Cerritos at the start of the series, and helps introduce the audience to the setting and characters. Creator Mike McMahan believes he would act like Tendi if he ever got the chance to work on a starship. Wells was cast as Tendi for the series in July 2019. McMahan noted that the writers would be telling a story in the second season with the characters Beckett Mariner and D'Vana Tendi together, which was explored in the second-season episode "We'll Always Have Tom Paris". During her time on the ship, Tendi quickly befriends Sam Rutherford. In the first-season episode "Much Ado About Boimler," she genetically created a dog with freakish capabilities that she named The Dog as a science experiment. Due to being unfamiliar with normal dogs, Tendi assumes The Dog's abilities to be normal. She is forced to relinquish The Dog into Starfleet's care at their medical recovery spa planet of Endicronimas V – otherwise known as "The Farm" – but The Dog assures Tendi that she is fully happy to be placed there. As they part ways, Tendi realizes that The Dog was a freak of nature, but chooses not to worry about it. Later, Tendi befriends an Exocomp, Peanut Hamper, until Peanut Hamper betrays Tendi during a crisis and flies away to the enemy ship. After Shaxs sacrifices himself so an injured Rutherford can escape, Tendi stays by his side in the hospital until he wakes up. When he states he has amnesia, she is excited, as she looks forward to their friendship growing again. In the season 2 finale "First First Contact", T'Ana recommends Tendi for Senior Science Officer training, as she feels that Tendi's talents and potential extend past Medical. In season 3, Tendi realizes that she wants to captain her own ship one day. Hinted at in season 2 and confirmed in season 3 is that Tendi's family are Orion pirates, a legacy that she is rebelling against, despite having formidable combat and pirating skills. On her native Orion, she is known as Mistress of the Winter Constellations, although she tries to downplay the title. In season 4, Tendi was promoted to Lieutenant Jr. Grade and helps Rutherford overcome his anxieties about his belated promotion, including having his previously declined promotion accepted to Lieutenant Jr. Grade as well.

=== Rutherford ===
==== Sam Rutherford ====
Samanthan "Sam" Rutherford (voiced by Eugene Cordero) is a human ensign aboard the Cerritos, Rutherford is adjusting to a new cyborg implant. McMahan compared Rutherford to the Star Trek: The Next Generation character Geordi La Forge, saying they are both "amazing at engineering stuff" but Rutherford does not always solve the problem like Geordi because he is still learning. Rutherford is a good friend of D'Vana Tendi in the series. In the season one finale, Shaxs sacrifices himself for Rutherford so the latter can escape. Rutherford's implant is torn out in the process, so he gets amnesia. Tendi stays by his side in the hospital until he wakes up. When he states he has amnesia, she is excited, as she looks forward to their friendship growing again. It is revealed at the end of the second season that his cyborg implant was not elective surgery, as he had believed, and that he has lost his memories and previous personality before; in the third season, more sinister information about how and why he got the implant is revealed. It turns out that he was a pawn of corrupt Starfleet Admiral Les Buenamigo's scheme to advance in his own career, and Rutherford plays a role of thwarting it when the plan goes out of control. Afterward, Rutherford decides to keep the implant, which, though part of this criminal conspiracy, is simply too useful to remove. In season 4, Rutherford was promoted to Lieutenant Jr. Grade. As it turned out, Rutherford had declined promotion multiple times previously, to avoid losing touch with his closest friends. When Rutherford's comrades were all promoted except for him, he endeavored to earn his own promotion, only to be frustrated by a rival. When Tendi learned of his anxieties and his previously declined promotions, she simply asked the Chief Engineer if Rutherford could accept the previously offered promotion and it was granted immediately, upon which he takes up quarters with Boimler. At the end of the series, Rutherford has the head implant removed and his head organically reconstructed to operate as normal.

==== Red Rutherford ====
In the third-season episode "Reflections", Rutherford's implant malfunctions, allowing an alternate personality to take over. During a skirmish with security, Rutherford ends up in a coma. In his mindscape, Rutherford realizes that the personality, Samanthan "Red" Rutherford, is his younger "real" self, whose memories were saved before he received his implant a decade earlier (and who had briefly re-taken over his body numerous times offscreen throughout the previous two seasons), and whose "cool" personality traits were erased, including his life as an angry first year recruit in Starfleet who funded unsanctioned engineering projects by secretly building and illegally racing and winning space vehicles at Devron, challenging Rutherford to a race with any vehicle they can imagine; the winner getting control of their body. Rutherford wins by piloting a Delta Flyer crewed by his lower decks friends. Red concedes, seeing that his new life brought growth, and shares the real memory of how they got their implant before he disappears into his own consciousness: the younger Rutherford's experimental engine blew up, gravely injuring him, before shadowy members of Starfleet installed the implant to erase his memories of their own mysterious illegal activity, trapping Red within his own mind. While simply referred to as the younger Rutherford, Red's name is revealed via the episode's subtitles.

=== Carol Freeman ===
Carol Freeman (voiced by Dawnn Lewis) is the human captain of the Cerritos. McMahan described her as a capable Starfleet captain whose starship is not very important. Freeman does not want her daughter, Mariner, to be on the Cerritos and is looking for a reason to have her transferred to another ship. In the first-season finale, Freeman's relationship with Mariner is revealed, but by the end of the episode they realize they can work together rather than be enemies aboard the ship. In the second season, Freeman receives a scathing performance review that leads her to believe she needs to be less controlling of her away teams. She does not check in while Tendi, Rutherford, Mariner, and Jet Manhaver are in danger on a collector's ship, however they still make it out okay. A more serious incident occurs when she responds to a distress call without recalling an away team on extravehicular activity back on board first, leaving them stranded in space and recovered barely before their suits' life support systems were fatally depleted. In spite of these issues, Freeman is a candidate for reassignment to a more prestigious ship by the third season, but she has second thoughts about the reassignment upon learning that she would not be able to take her crew with her. In the third season, Freeman, based on her experiences with the Pakleds and other "legacy" planets, develops and presents a proposal for the Cerritos and other second contact ships to follow-up on planets and species that were the subject of brief Starfleet intervention without additional support (i.e., planets visited in one-off episodes of the original series and The Next Generation). In the fourth season, Freeman participated in negotiations with Grand Nagus Rom and his wife, First Clerk Leeta, to begin the process of having the Ferengi homeworld, Ferenginar, join the United Federation of Planets. In the talks, Freeman saw through the leaders' testing of the Federation's willingness to respect their culture and impressed them by subtly including a fine print clause in the written agreement that required the Ferengi to perform the seemingly impossible task to bring the Klingon homeworld into the UFP as well. At that, the Ferengi leadership agreed to the original arrangements while the other Starfleet admiral, who had been fooled to the point of humiliating himself to placate them, promised to inform Starfleet of Freeman's acumen in this delicate situation. Freeman's preferred catchphrase as the Cerritos engages warp drive is "Warp me!" At the end of season 5 and the series, Freeman is reassigned to the repurposed and relocated Starbase 80 to oversee explorations of a stable dimensional portal.

=== Jack Ransom ===
Jack Ransom (voiced by Jerry O'Connell) is the human first officer of the Cerritos, whom McMahan compared to Next Generation's William Riker, if he was on speed and had less shame. He soon recognizes Boimler's considerable talents as an officer and becomes responsible for Mariner's final probationary period with full authority to dishonorably discharge her if she fails. Ransom is eventually satisfied at her progress, but he later witnesses Mariner in an unauthorized act that leads to a misunderstanding shared with the captain that is serious enough to drive Mariner to resign her commission. Eventually, Mariner returns to Starfleet and Ransom, to his horror, is assigned as her mentor for her newfound resolve to now seriously rise in the ranks. When Ransom decides to promote Mariner, and she objects, he refuses to reverse it. A misunderstanding soon develops, though is resolved with his reassurance that he is not giving up on her, and she accepts her new rank. At the end of season 5 and the series, Ransom has been promoted to Captain of the USS Cerritos after Captain Freeman has been reassigned to the repurposed and relocated Starbase 80 to oversee explorations of a stable dimensional portal.

=== Shaxs ===
Shaxs (voiced by Fred Tatasciore) is a Bajoran tactical officer aboard the Cerritos. Shaxs /ˈʃæks/ is extremely aggressive with a warrior ethos and a willingness to go into battle, while simultaneously being emotionally fragile and easily reduced to tears. He has been described as a parody of both Worf and Kira Nerys, who is a former comrade of his. Shaxs dies in battle at the end of the first season while saving Rutherford but sacrificing himself. The second season introduces a new security chief for the Cerritos, and Shaxs returns in the third episode of season two, apparently revived by unspeakable methods. He is in a romantic relationship with Dr. T'Ana. In addition, while he has little to do with the Lower Deckers, his opinion of Ensign Boimler dramatically changes for the better when the Ensign's determination to make up for an inadvertent insult is successful in enabling Shaxs to fulfill his favorite battle tactic of ejecting the warp core in a time of need.

=== T'Ana ===
T'Ana (voiced by Gillian Vigman) is a Caitian doctor and head of medical aboard the Cerritos. McMahan described her as "a good doctor, but she's an unpleasant cat." Including a Caitian in the series is a reference to Star Trek: The Animated Series which also starred a member of that species, M'Ress. T'ana is portrayed as extremely cantankerous, frequently using foul language in her interactions with others. She is in a romantic relationship with Shaxs, which includes playing out violent sexual fantasies in the holodeck.

=== T'Lyn ===
T'Lyn (voiced by Gabrielle Ruiz) is a female Vulcan formerly of the Vulcan ship Sh'vhal in the second-season episode, "wej Duj". While just as intellectually devoted as her comrades, T'Lyn causes friction by allowing her logical reasoning to be influenced by additional thought processes, like intuition and instinct, and being stubborn enough to resist criticism of that way of thinking. The fact that this combination often allows her to develop reasonable conclusions and effective solutions to serious problems, is taken as evidence of her illogical incompatibility with the crew. As such, the captain transfers her to Starfleet where her personality and talents would be more tolerated and valued. She is later assigned to the USS Cerritos in the third-season finale, "The Stars at Night," where she is boisterously welcomed by Ensign D'Vana Tendi as her new training partner. In season 4, she is promoted to provisional Lieutenant Jr. Grade; an unexpected boon considering her efforts to return to the Vulcan fleet, but welcomed nonetheless. As a result, as her previous superiors in the Vulcan fleet anticipated, T'Lyn regularly shares in the Lower Deckers' adventures where she proves to be a valued asset and a good friend. However, her personal turmoil about whether she is a proper Vulcan led to inadvertent telepathic disruptions of the crew of the Cerritos, which itself has led to concerns that she may be suffering from an early-onset female variant of Bendii Syndrome, a rare degenerative neurological disease, similar to Alzheimer's disease, that mainly affects elderly Vulcan males. At the conclusion of the Cerritos crew defeating renegade Nick Locarno's insurrection, T'Lyn's former Captain attempts to contact T'Lyn, likely to invite her back to his crew, and she declines in preference of being a Starfleet officer. In season 5, at the recommendation of a Data from an alternate universe, she is jointly promoted to senior science officer of the Cerritos alongside Tendi.

== Recurring characters ==
=== Barnes ===
Barnes (voiced by Jessica McKenna) is a female unjoined Trill ensign on the Cerritos. She is most often seen manning the Ops station on the bridge. Rutherford tries to date her twice, once in the first season and again in the second, but it doesn't work out either time.

=== Steve Stevens ===
Steve Stevens (voiced by series writer Ben Rodgers) is a human lieutenant commander on the Cerritos. He idolizes Ransom and is constantly trying to ingratiate himself with him.

=== Andy Billups ===
Andy Billups (voiced by Paul Scheer) is a human lieutenant commander and the chief engineer of the Cerritos, and the direct boss of Rutherford. He was formerly the Crown Prince on the planet Hysperia, but abdicated his birthright for an engineering career in Starfleet, although his mother the Queen refuses to accept his decision and plots to force him to resign his commission and take the throne.

=== Cerritos computer ===
The USS Cerritos computer is voiced by Jessica McKenna.

=== Badgey ===
Badgey (voiced by Jack McBrayer) is a malfunctioning sentient hologram in the form of an anthropomorphic Starfleet badge. Rutherford creates Badgey as a training simulation, but Badgey soon betrays his so-called "father". Rutherford, with Tendi's help, subdues Badgey and freezes him to death. During the final moments of his life, Badgey apologizes to Rutherford for his misdoings. Rutherford reactivates Badgey in the first-season finale, "No Small Parts," realizing he is the only one who can help in his moment of need against the Pakleds to deliver a virus to their attacking ship against the Cerritos in order to destroy it. Badgey does so but also activates the ship's self-destruct to kill Rutherford out of revenge. Rutherford escapes, but with amnesia, while Shaxs, who was with him; is killed.

In the third-season finale, "The Stars At Night," Rutherford discovers to his alarm that a new fleet of autonomous Starfleet ships, the Texas class, are controlled by malicious artificial intelligence based on the same programming as Badgey. At the moment that the ships are assigned full autonomy by renegade Starfleet Admiral Les Buenamigo, the ships' AI displays the same violent psychopathic tendencies and turns on Buenamigo; only later to be destroyed by the combined California class Starfleet fleet. However, in that episode's post-credits scene, it is revealed that Badgey's code was not destroyed, as the original implant that Shaxs tore from Rutherford's head had survived among the wreckage in the Battle of Kalla's aftermath and was unwittingly salvaged by a Drookmani ship.

In the fourth-season seventh episode, "A Few Badgeys More," Badgey seizes control of its crew and sought to both find salvage and destroy USS Cerritos when encountered. To prevent the latter, Rutherford boarded the ship to sacrifice himself, but when he instead tried to accept Badgey as a figurative son, the resulting mental conflict leads to Badgey splitting himself into separate individuals, Goodgey and later Logic-y (the latter of whom is destroyed by Badgey), to maintain his obsession. Eventually, Badgey plans to destroy everything by gaining total access to the collective computer resources of the Federation and attaining nigh-godhood status. However, that newly gained cosmic awareness makes Badgey realize the error of his ways due to the pointlessness of his malevolent obsession and apologize for his behavior before ascending to another reality for a more constructive existence. Rutherford returns to the Cerritos and keeps Goodgey as a safely benign version of Badgey, but its display of the same occasional glitching that signaled Badgey's psychosis suggests a possible renewed threat to his friends.

=== Jennifer Sh'reyan ===
Jennifer Sh'reyan (voiced by Lauren Lapkus) is an Andorian ensign on the Cerritos. At first antagonistic with Mariner, the two begin a romantic relationship sometime between Season 2 and 3. However, Jennifer ends the relationship due to a misunderstanding during Mariner's unauthorized interview with Victoria Nuzé. In the end of the Season 3 finale, Mariner shows no signs of repairing the relationship. In season 5, Mariner and Jennifer end the relationship on their own terms before she transfers to the Manitoba.

=== Alonzo Freeman ===
Alonzo Freeman (voiced by Phil LaMarr) is Mariner's father and a Starfleet admiral. At the end of the series, Alonzo is rassigned to the relocated and repurposed Starbase 80 to oversee explorations of a stable inter-dimensional portal with his wife, Captain Carol Freeman.

=== Kayshon ===
Kayshon (voiced by Carl Tart) is a Tamarian lieutenant on the Cerritos.

=== Dr. Gabers Migleemo ===
Dr. Gabers Migleemo (voiced by Paul F. Tompkins) is a Klowakhan psychologist. He serves Ship's Counsellor on the USS Cerritios, but his methods are considered questionable with his predilection for his cultural habit for food and cuisine analogies. June 2020, Newsome was asked by a fan on Twitter if comedian Paul F. Tompkins would have a guest role in the series given Newsome was a frequent guest on Tompkins' podcast Spontaneanation. Tompkins expressed interest in the idea, and McMahan responded to say that he was organizing to have Tompkins cast for a guest role in the series' second season. He ultimately appeared as Migleemo in the series.

=== Les Buenamigo ===
Les Buenamigo (voiced by Carlos Alazraqui) is a vice admiral and an old family friend of the Freemans. While initially portrayed as an ally towards her, Buenamigo is eventually revealed to have been behind Rutherford's memory loss in order to cover up his involvement in Buenamigo's illegal project to develop the fully automated Texas-class ships. With the ship class ready to go, the Admiral manipulated Capt. Freeman to put them in danger, namely by sending them to the planet Brekka knowing that it was invaded by the enemy power, The Breen, in order for his new autonomous ships to intervene. When his crimes are discovered, Buenamigo gives one of his ships, the Aledo, full autonomy and orders it to destroy the Cerritos to cover up his crimes. However, the Aledo‘s rogue AI, which is based on Lt. Rutherford's design, Badgey, whom Buenamigo did not know was murderously psychopathic, refuses and kills Buenamigo by firing phaser blasts directly into his office.

== Guest characters ==
=== Introduced in previous series ===
- Q (voiced by John de Lancie, season 1), a member of the Q Continuum who accidentally teleports onto the Cerritos.
- Leonardo da Vinci (voiced by Gary Cole, season 1)
- William Riker (voiced by Jonathan Frakes, seasons 1–2), captain of the USS Titan After the end of the first season, McMahan confirmed that Jonathan Frakes would return as his Star Trek: The Next Generation character William Riker in the second season after guest starring in the first-season finale.
- Deanna Troi (voiced by Marina Sirtis, season 1), a character from The Next Generation. Along with the announcement that Frakes would reprise his role in a larger capacity in the second season of the series, it was also revealed that Marina Sirtis would not return as Deanna Troi because "the stories didn't go that way".
- Tom Paris (voiced by Robert Duncan McNeill, season 2), a character from Voyager. He visits the Cerritos on a handshake tour much to the excitement of Boimler.
- Borg Queen (voiced by Alice Krige, season 2), an antagonist that was introduced in First Contact and killed during the series finale of Voyager. Krige reprises the role, voicing the Borg Queen as a hologram in one of Starfleet's holographic training drills.
- Sonya Gomez (voiced by Lycia Naff, season 2), a character from the second season of The Next Generation. She appears as the captain of the USS Archimedes in the second-season finale of Lower Decks.

McMahan added that there would be other characters in the second season returning from previous Star Trek series, and said they would "come in a way that you don't expect". McMahan also stated in May 2021 that there would be "legacy guest roles" in the third season, but they would be "people you're not going to expect when you get them" which he felt was more surprising and satisfying for fans.

- Kira Nerys (voiced by Nana Visitor, season 3), a character from Deep Space Nine.
- Quark (voiced by Armin Shimerman, season 3), a character from Deep Space Nine.
- Hikaru Sulu (voiced by George Takei, season 3), a character from The Original Series. The character appears in a hallucination experienced by Boimler.
- Rom (voiced by Max Grodénchik, season 4), a character from Deep Space Nine, Quark's brother, and the Grand Nagus of the Ferengi. Due to the threat of Nova Fleet, Rom negotiates with Captain Carol Freeman and Admiral Vassery to have the Ferengi join the Federation.
- Leeta (voiced by Chase Masterson, season 4) a character from Deep Space Nine, Rom's wife, and First Clerk of the Ferengi Alliance. She helps her husband in the Ferengi negotiations with the Federation.
- Nick Locarno (voiced by Robert Duncan McNeil, season 4), a character from The Next Generation. Previously appearing in "The First Duty," Locarno was the disgraced former leader of the elite Nova Squadron who got one of his squadronmates killed in a dangerous stunt. After being exposed by Wesley Crusher, Locarno was expelled from Starfleet Academy and became a civilian pilot for hire and ultimately the leader of Nova Fleet, a fleet made up of starships from various races whose lower deckers mutinied under Locarno's influence. Locarno was killed when he was caught in the explosion of a Ferengi Genesis Device which formed a planet that was named after him.
- Wesley Crusher (voiced by Wil Wheaton, season 4), a character from The Next Generation. Wheaton reprises the role in a flashback to Locarno's academy days.
- Sito Jaxa (voiced by Shannon Fill, season 4) a character from The Next Generation who died on a top-secret mission in "Lower Decks," the episode that inspired the creation of Star Trek: Lower Decks. She appears in a flashback to Locarno's academy days and is mentioned to have been a close friend of Beckett Mariner's.
- Data (voiced by Brent Spiner, season 5), the android officer of the USS Enterprise-D and the USS Enterprise-E from Star Trek: The Next Generation. Spiner reprises the role as the Data from an alternate universe where everything is "slightly more purple."
- T'Pol (voiced by Jolene Blalock, season 5), the Vulcan first officer of the Enterprise from Star Trek: Enterprise. Blalock reprises the role as a T'Pol from an alternate universe where she was married to Trip Tucker for 63 years and became an expert in human emotion.
- Elim Garak (voiced by Andrew J. Robinson, season 5), the former Cardassian spy from Deep Space Nine. Robinson reprises the role as a Garak from an alternate universe where Garak became a surgeon instead of a tailor after leaving the Obsidian Order and married an alternate universe version of Julian Bashir.
- Julian Bashir (voiced by Alexander Siddig, season 5), the former doctor from Deep Space Nine. Siddig reprises the role as a Bashir from an alternate universe. Unlike the Bashir seen in Deep Space Nine, this Bashir is an emergency medical hologram – similar to the Doctor – that is a copy of Bashir rather than Bashir himself. He married the Elim Garak from a different alternate reality.
- Harry Kim (voiced by Garrett Wang, season 5), the former operations officer of the USS Voyager from Star Trek: Voyager. Wang reprises the role as several different alternate universe versions of Kim, only one of which has been promoted beyond ensign.

=== Introduced in season one ===
- K'orin (voiced by Jess Harnell), a Klingon general who Boimler and Mariner are set to transport to his planet. He later reappears as a part of the Klingon Oversight Council in season 5.
- Quimp (voiced by Tom Kenny), a Ferengi friend of Mariner's, who appears in the episodes "Envoys" and "Parth Ferengi's Heart Place."
- O'Connor (voiced by Haley Joel Osment), a human lieutenant junior grade on Cerritos attempting to achieve spiritual ascension.
- Durango (voiced by Al Rodrigo), the Tellarite captain of USS Merced
- Barbara Brinson (voiced by Gillian Jacobs), a human lieutenant aboard USS Vancouver, who was briefly in a relationship with Boimler.
- Ron Docent (voiced by Matt Walsh), a human lieutenant commander aboard USS Vancouver.
- A Drookmani captain (voiced by J.G. Hertzler)
- Amina Ramsey (voiced by Toks Olagundoye) is the human captain of USS Oakland and Mariner's former classmate at Starfleet Academy. While not explicitly stated in the show, series creator Mike McMahan has stated Ramsey and Mariner are former lovers.
- Peanut Hamper (voiced by Kether Donohue), an Exocomp with an initially hidden self-serving sociopathic personality who joins the ensigns in the season one finale but later betrays them in their time of need. She eventually finds herself on an alien civilization in the third-season episode "A Mathematically Perfect Redemption", where she seems to have changed her ways during her time with them, even falling in love, but also plots to betray it as well in order to regain Starfleet's good graces. She is eventually exposed and imprisoned on Earth by Starfleet at the Daystrom Institute for Advanced Robotics for malevolent artificially intelligent machines. In Season 4, she expresses remorse for what she did and returns home to the Tyrus VIIA mining station.
- Vendome (voiced by Sam Richardson) is a Bolian ensign on the Cerritos. In the season 3 episode "The Least Dangerous Game", the main characters discover that Vendome received a promotion to captain.
- Jet Manhaver (voiced by Marcus Henderson) is a human lieutenant on the Cerritos. He dated Barbara Brinson before Boimler did. In season two, Jet competes with Mariner after Jet takes Boimler's position. Eventually, on a dangerous mission that goes south, the two realize they need to let Rutherford and Tendi take charge, and they make it out alive.
- Fletcher (voiced by Tim Robinson) is a human ensign on the Cerritos who is promoted to lieutenant and transferred to the Titan, before being apparently fired from Starfleet for his incompetence. In the series finale, he is revealed to be stationed at Starbase 80, infamously among the worst penalties available for non-criminal infractions, suggesting that Fletcher's incompetence resulted in his eventual transfer there. Fletcher is seen in the background attending a party, although without indication of his current rank or position on the station.
- Delta Shift are a group of "lower deckers" who act as recurring foils and rivals for the main cast, who are assigned to Beta Shift. The members of Delta Shift are Ensigns Asif (Asif Ali), Karavitus (Artemis Pebdani), and Moxie (Mary Holland).

=== Introduced in season two ===
- Ma'ah (voiced by Jon Curry) is a Klingon warrior and lower decker on the Bird of Prey Che'Ta'. When his captain conspired with the Pakleds to destabilize the Federation, Ma'ah mutinied and killed Dorg in single combat, taking command of the ship. Ma'ah was later one of the captains whose crew mutinied against him under the influence of Nick Locarno, but he eventually regained control of his ship with the help of Beckett Mariner. As a result, Ma'ah was removed from his captaincy with Dorg's brother Bargh blocking all of his attempts to appeal the decision. Ma'ah eventually regained his captaincy with the help of Brad Boimler and Mariner but chose to captain his brother Malor's bloodwine delivery ship rather than the Che'Ta' again, having hated it. Ma'ah and Malor are later hunted by Dorg and Bargh's vengeful sister Relga, and have refuge on the Cerritos over Ma'ah's objections. The brothers help the Cerritos stop a rift from destroying the prime universe, though it destroys Relga's ship. Afterwards, as a result of Relga's dishonorable actions, the Klingon High Council gives Ma'ah command of Relga's fleet, the bloodwine delivery ship having been destroyed in her attack.
