= Star Trek: Lower Decks season 3 =

Star Trek: Lower Decks
- Season 3
- Promotional poster with art by Matt Ferguson, parodying a poster for the film Star Trek III: The Search for Spock (1984) by Bob Peak
- Showrunner: Mike McMahan
- Starring: Tawny Newsome; Jack Quaid; Noël Wells; Eugene Cordero; Dawnn Lewis; Jerry O'Connell; Fred Tatasciore; Gillian Vigman
- No. of episodes: 10

Release
- Original network: Paramount+
- Original release: August 25 – October 27, 2022

Season chronology
- ← Previous; Season 2 Next → Season 4

The third season of the American adult animated television series Star Trek: Lower Decks is set in the 24th century and follows the adventures of the low-ranking officers with menial jobs on the starship Cerritos, one of Starfleet's least important starships. The season was produced by CBS Eye Animation Productions in association with Secret Hideout, Important Science, Roddenberry Entertainment, and animation studio Titmouse, with Mike McMahan serving as showrunner and Barry J. Kelly as supervising director.

Tawny Newsome, Jack Quaid, Noël Wells, and Eugene Cordero voice the lower decks crew members of the Cerritos, with Dawnn Lewis, Jerry O'Connell, Fred Tatasciore, and Gillian Vigman providing voices for the ship's senior officers. A third season of Lower Decks was ordered in April 2021. Writing was underway by the next month and was completed in September, with voice recording taking around a year from June 2021 to June 2022. The cliffhanger ending of the second season is resolved in the third-season premiere, allowing new stories to be explored with the main characters. In addition to an episode that revisits the setting and some key characters of the series Star Trek: Deep Space Nine, the season features many connections and references to other past Star Trek media such as Star Trek: The Next Generation, including several actors returning as guest stars.

The season premiered on the streaming service Paramount+ on August 25, 2022, and ran for 10 episodes until October 27. A fourth season was ordered in January 2022.

== Episodes ==
Star Trek: Lower Decks season 3 episodes
No. overall	No. in season	Title	Directed by	Written by	Original release date
21	1	"Grounded"	Jason Zurek	Chris Kula	August 25, 2022
The trial of Captain Carol Freeman for allegedly detonating a bomb on Pakled Planet begins. Freeman's daughter, Ensign Beckett Mariner, ignores her father's pleas to trust the system to prove her mother innocent. Mariner instead recruits fellow ensigns Brad Boimler, D'Vana Tendi, and Sam Rutherford to help her sneak onto the impounded USS Cerritos and retrieve evidence that Freeman could not have been responsible for the bombing. They hijack an amusement park spaceship—based on the life of Zefram Cochrane, the first human to travel faster than light—and board the Cerritos, but are unable to find the evidence they need. Mariner decides to steal the Cerritos and fly it to Earth but they are caught by Starfleet security. The group are saved by the arrival of Freeman and the senior crew, who explain that Starfleet's undercover operations determined that the Pakleds framed Freeman in a bid to gain a better home planet. Because of Mariner's continued disobedience, Freeman puts her under the direct supervision of Commander Jack Ransom who cannot wait to find a reason to fire Mariner.
22	2	"The Least Dangerous Game"	Michael Mullen	Garrick Bernard	September 1, 2022
Discouraged that playing it safe is holding him back from advancing in rank, Boimler opts to say yes to more opportunities and agrees to be the prey for an alien hunter named K'ranch. Boimler initially flees before attempting to turn the tables on K'ranch. He is easily captured, but K'ranch then releases Boimler and commends him to his superior officers. An ecstatic Boimler decides to be "Bold Boimler" from now on. Meanwhile, Mariner joins Ransom, Rutherford, and chief engineer Andy Billups on a mission to repair a broken orbital lift. In an effort to prove Mariner's insubordinate tendencies, Ransom has Billups and Rutherford handle diplomatic relations with the locals while he and Mariner attempt the repairs. Ransom and Mariner struggle with the repairs while Billups and Rutherford transgress upon local customs. Mariner sneaks away to assist them, but returns before Ransom notices after he apologizes for trying to provoke her. Ransom solves the diplomatic ties, rescuing Rutherford and Billups. Ransom thanks Mariner for following his orders but says this does not make up for her past behavior.
23	3	"Mining the Mind's Mines"	Fill Marc Sagadraca	Brian D. Bradley	September 8, 2022
The Cerritos and USS Carlsbad are sent to finalize peace relations between the Scrubble, who are rock-like aliens, and Federation scientists on Jengus IV. Mariner, Boimler, and Rutherford assist members of the Carlsbad crew in deactivating the Scrubble's psychic landmines, which tempt people with visions of their fantasies and then turn them to stone. On the Cerritos, Tendi starts senior science officer training under Dr. Migleemo who tasks her with getting the captain's attention during the peace negotiations. When several mines are accidentally broken they begin showing visions of nightmares. Fleeing into a nearby cave, the ensigns discover a lab where the Scrubble and scientists have been working together to gather Starfleet data. The Carlsbad crew also reveal that the Cerritos crew have earned a reputation as mavericks among the other California-class ships. Tendi notes strange readings from a gift that Freeman and the Carlsbad's Captain Maier are given by the Scrubble. She eventually proves to Freeman that the gift contains spy equipment just as the other ensigns arrive and explain the plot.
24	4	"Room for Growth"	Jason Zurek	John Cochran	September 15, 2022
Captain Freeman rewards the exhausted engineering crew by taking them to a relaxation spa, the Dove. They continue to engage in work despite the best efforts of Freeman and the spa manager to get them to relax, causing Freeman's own stress level to rise to emergency levels. Boimler, Tendi, and Mariner complain about the cramped quarters and lack of privacy in lower decks. After overhearing that members of Delta Shift plan to hack the lottery to gain individual upper deck rooms, the trio race to hack the lottery first. They journey through perilous areas of the ship and arrive at the lottery computer terminal before Delta Shift, but there is only one room available. Not wanting to break up their friend group, they opt to allow Delta Shift to fight over it. However, Delta Shift decide to share the one room and throw a party to celebrate. The trio realize that they should have thought about sharing the room. On the Dove, the engineering crew feel guilty about Freeman and create a machine that is able to instantly destress her, which the spa manager secretly orders destroyed before it puts her out of business.
25	5	"Reflections"	Michael Mullen	Mike McMahan	September 22, 2022
Ransom assigns Boimler and Mariner to staff the Starfleet recruitment booth at Tulgana IV's job fair and warns Mariner not to step out of line. After they leave, Sam's cyborg eye implant malfunctions and allows an alternate personality called "Red Rutherford" to emerge. Sam realizes that Red is his younger self, an angry first year Starfleet recruit who secretly builds experimental vehicles for illegal races. In their mindscape, Red challenges Sam to a race for control of their body. On Tulgana IV, Mariner and Boimler are mocked by various attendees including Petra Aberdeen, a smug former Starfleet officer turned archaeologist. Unable to handle the mocking, Boimler rampages around the job fair and accidentally draws enough attention to meet their quota for sign-ups. Sam wins the mind race and Red reveals what happened to him: his experimental engine blew up, gravely injuring him, and unknown Starfleet officials installed the implant to erase his memories. Ransom punishes Boimler with a night in the brig, but commends him for defending Starfleet, while Aberdeen offers Mariner a job outside Starfleet.
26	6	"Hear All, Trust Nothing"	Fill Marc Sagadraca	Grace Parra Janney	September 29, 2022
Freeman oversees trade negotiations with the Karemma at Deep Space 9 while Mariner struggles to be personable with her girlfriend Jennifer's pretentious friends. Tendi and Rutherford encounter an Orion DS9 officer, Mesk, who only talks about Orion pirate culture which Tendi has tried to distance herself from. Freeman introduces the Karemma to Quark, owner of the bar franchise "Quark's", who is using a new replicator. The Karemma kidnap him and shut down all power on DS9, which seals Mariner, Jennifer, and Jennifer's friends inside a room. The friends become hysterical and Jennifer tells Mariner to handle them as she usually would; Mariner gleefully stuns them all with a phaser. Mesk confesses that he grew up on Earth and learned of Orion culture from trashy novels. They witness the Karemma taking Quark and Tendi uses her pirate skills to stop them, acknowledging that these are part of her identity. The Karemma reveal that Quark stole their technology for his replicators, and Freeman uses this information to negotiate a deal where the Karemma receive 76 percent of Quark's profits.
27	7	"A Mathematically Perfect Redemption"	Jason Zurek	Ann Kim	October 6, 2022
After refusing to help defeat the Pakleds in the Kalla system and transporting off the Cerritos, (Note: As depicted in the first-season finale episode "No Small Parts") Exocomp ensign Peanut Hamper finds herself alone in space and threatened by Drookmani scavengers. She builds a ship from nearby wreckage and travels to a planet inhabited by a winged species, the Areore, who are amazed by her technological abilities. Though initially dismissive of all organic lifeforms, Peanut Hamper's attitude softens as she joins the Areore tribe and falls in love with the chief's son. She learns that their ancestors achieved space travel but chose to turn their back on technology when it just led to war. The Drookmani arrive seeking to scavenge the ancient Areore starships and Peanut Hamper sends a distress call which is answered by the Cerritos. The Drookmani reveal that Peanut Hamper had invited them to take the ships, revealing her change of heart to be a ruse as part of a plan to have Starfleet rescue and forgive her. Instead, the Cerritos has her imprisoned in the Daystrom Institute for Advanced Robotics alongside the malevolent computer AGIMUS, who proposes an alliance.
28	8	"Crisis Point 2: Paradoxus"	Michael Mullen	Ben Rodgers	October 13, 2022
Boimler creates a holodeck movie titled Crisis Point II: Paradoxus, the sequel to Mariner's earlier Crisis Point. In Paradoxus, Romulans steal a top secret gem capable of time travel and plan to use it to erase the Federation. However, Boimler loses his enthusiasm for the story after a meeting with Ransom and instead becomes obsessed with discovering the meaning of life. Tendi leads the story's mission instead and is disheartened when Rutherford does not take it seriously. Annoyed with Boimler, Mariner leaves the holodeck. Ransom tells her that William, Boimler's clone who was created in a transporter accident, has died in a gas leak. Mariner returns to the program to help Boimler work through his feelings. Tendi admits to Rutherford that she aspires to be a captain and he helps her finish the story. After being in the holodeck for too long and becoming dangerously dehydrated, Boimler has a dream where famous Starfleet captain Hikaru Sulu tells him to embrace the randomness of life. Elsewhere, William's death is shown to be a ruse as part of his joining Section 31, Starfleet's secretive black ops division.
29	9	"Trusted Sources"	Fill Marc Sagadraca	Ben M. Waller	October 20, 2022
Freeman's proposed "Project Swing By" initiative, where California-class ships revisit planets abandoned by Starfleet, is approved by Admiral Les Buenamigo. He sends the Cerritos to Ornara, a planet whose population were forced to quit an addictive substance by Jean-Luc Picard and the USS Enterprise many years earlier. (Note: As depicted in the Star Trek: The Next Generation episode "Symbiosis") They are accompanied by journalist Victoria Nuzé, and Freeman attempts to control her experience to project competence. Finding Ornara thriving, Buenamigo sends the Cerritos to nearby planet Brekka instead. After Mariner circumvents Freeman to speak with Nuzé, the journalist confronts Freeman about embarrassing details from past missions. Freeman immediately transfers Mariner to Starbase 80, a dead-end assignment. On Brekka, the Cerritos is ambushed by the Breen and narrowly saved by the USS Aledo, Buenamigo's new fully automated Texas-class starship. Nuzé's report reveals that the embarrassing details came from the crew and Mariner had only glowing words for the ship and Freeman. Freeman tries to contact Mariner, but she has resigned and joined Aberdeen.
30	10	"The Stars at Night"	Jason Zurek	Mike McMahan	October 27, 2022
Buenamigo proposes that all California-class ships be replaced with his Texas-class ships and Freeman challenges him to a race. Mariner becomes suspicious of where Aberdeen is getting her money, but learns that she is funded by Picard and confesses that she was just looking for a reason to return to Starfleet. Freeman claims victory because while the Cerritos lost the race, it was so her crew could double check there were no lifeforms on a desolate planet which the automated ships did not do. Rutherford realizes that the automated ships use Red's experimental code and it was Buenamigo who erased his memories. Buenamigo orders the Texas-class ships to destroy the Cerritos, but the corrupted systems kill him and fire on all of Starfleet instead. Seeing this in a news report, Mariner and Aberdeen arrive with the other California-class ships and together they defeat the Texas-class ships. Freeman apologizes to Mariner, who rejoins the Cerritos along with new recruit T'Lyn. In the Kalla system, someone finds Rutherford's original implant which contains the corrupted artificial intelligence Badgey.

== Cast and characters ==
=== Main ===
- Tawny Newsome as Beckett Mariner
- Jack Quaid as Brad Boimler
- Noël Wells as D'Vana Tendi
- Eugene Cordero as Sam Rutherford
- Dawnn Lewis as Carol Freeman
- Jerry O'Connell as Jack Ransom
- Fred Tatasciore as Shaxs
- Gillian Vigman as T'Ana

=== Recurring ===
- Carlos Alazraqui as Les Buenamigo
- J.G. Hertzler as Martok and Drookmani captain
- Paul Scheer as Andy Billups
- Lauren Lapkus as Jennifer Sh'reyan
- Ben Rodgers as Steve Stevens
- Carl Tart as Kayshon
- Paul F. Tompkins as Migleemo
- Baron Vaughn as Maier
- Georgia King as Petra Aberdeen
- Jessica McKenna as Barnes

=== Notable guests ===
- James Cromwell as Zefram Cochrane
- Phil LaMarr as Alonzo Freeman
- Susan Gibney as Leah Brahms
- Armin Shimerman as Quark
- Nana Visitor as Kira Nerys
- Jeffrey Combs as AGIMUS
- Kether Donohue as Peanut Hamper
- George Takei as Hikaru Sulu
- Sam Richardson as Vendome
- Gabrielle Ruiz as T'Lyn

== Production ==
=== Development and writing ===
When announcing the premiere date for the second season of Star Trek: Lower Decks in April 2021, Paramount+ also officially ordered a 10-episode third season of the series. Writing for the third season had begun by late May, with creator and showrunner Mike McMahan knowing the direction for half of the season's episodes at that point. All of the scripts for the season were completed by mid-September.

The series focuses on the low-ranking support crew, or "lower deckers", of the USS Cerritos. By the end of the second season, McMahan came to feel that the ship's senior officers should be explored more in the series because they are "the top of the USS Cerritos but they're one of the bottoms of the fleet. That makes the Cerritos itself a lower decker." Following the second season's cliffhanger ending, McMahan said the third season would depict Captain Freeman's trial for allegedly bombing the Pakled homeworld. The third season also explores the new relationship between Beckett Mariner and Jennifer Sh'reyan, but the focus for Mariner's character remains her friendships and her relationship with her mother, Captain Freeman. McMahan said Mariner and Freeman had grown closer in the second season and the latter's arrest would lead to a new dynamic, with Mariner using her energy in non-constructive ways. Freeman's trial is resolved quickly in the season premiere, during a montage of events that the main characters were not involved in featuring the well-known characters Morgan Bateson and Tuvok from previous Star Trek series. McMahan said there was an "amazing episode" of Star Trek happening in the background of the premiere which the main characters were not aware of because they work in the lower decks, aligning with executive producer Alex Kurtzman's description of the series as having the "A story" of a typical Star Trek episode taking place in the background of each Lower Decks episode.

McMahan said the third season would take the first steps towards moving the central lower deckers up in rank, showing each take a different path to become the people that he planned for them to be at the end of the series. These new personal missions for the main characters are introduced across the first few episodes of the season: Mariner has to navigate answering to first officer Jack Ransom rather than her mother; Brad Boimler decides to be less cautious than in the first two seasons which leads him into some dangerous situations; D'Vana Tendi starts a new job in the sciences division after McMahan felt there was no room for her to grow in the medical division; and Sam Rutherford discovers the secrets behind his mysterious cyborg implant. The friendships between the main characters are further explored in "Room for Growth", which was inspired by the room lottery system at McMahan's college. He wanted the episode to be about the journey rather than the destination, similar to the 1986 coming-of-age film Stand by Me, and based several of the episode's locations on scenes from that film.

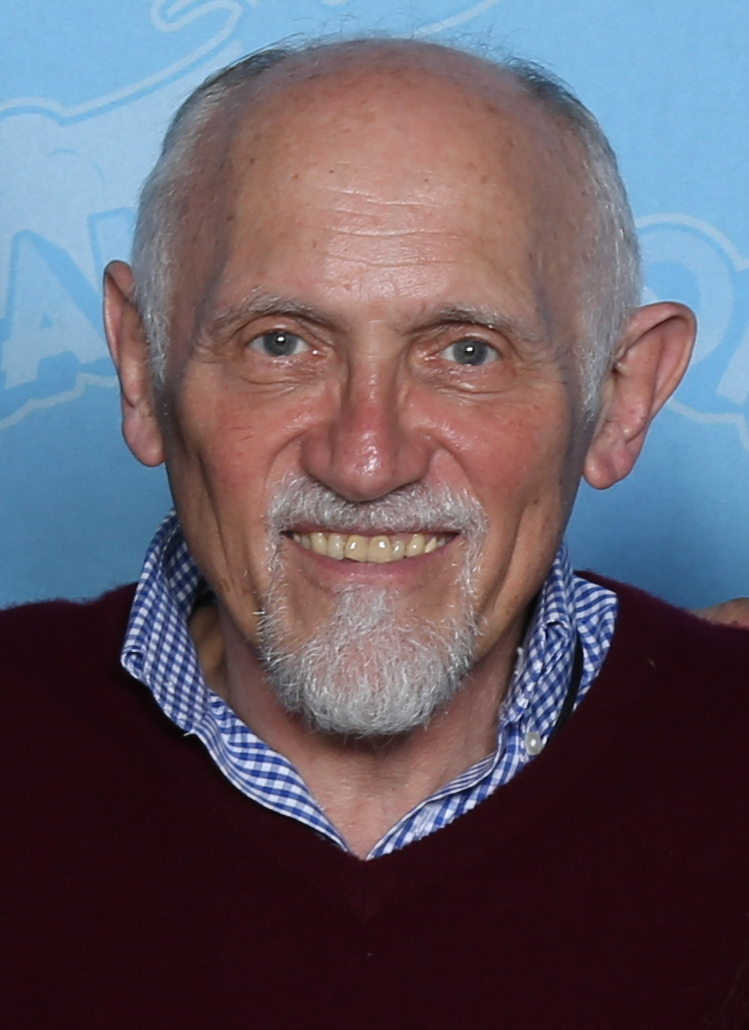
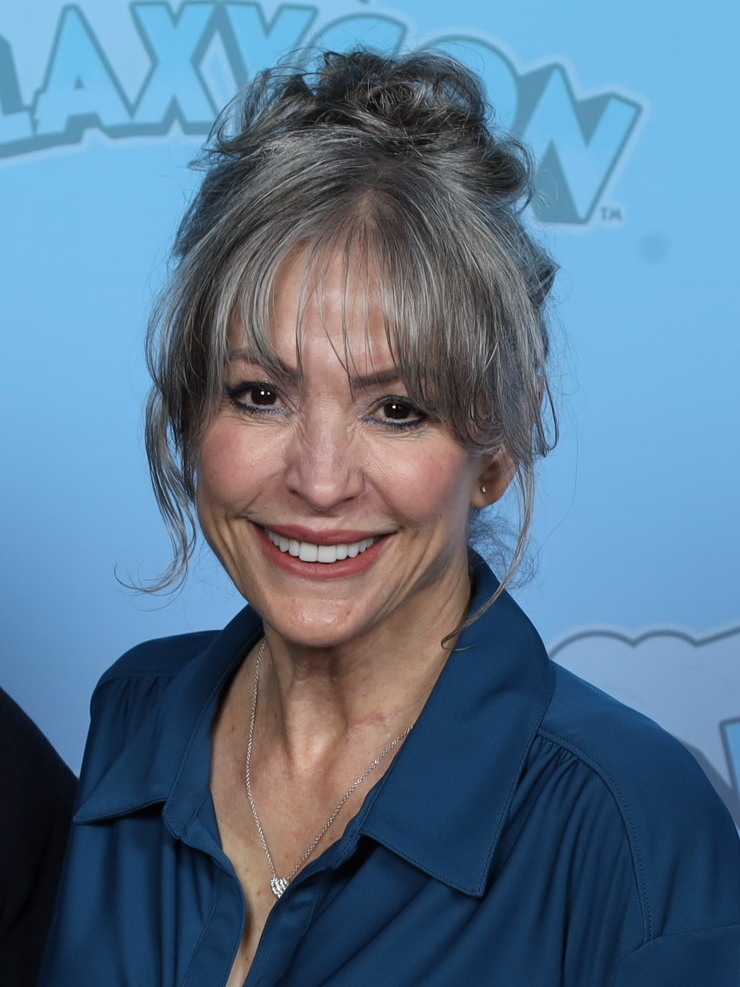
Armin Shimerman and Nana Visitor reprise their respective roles as Quark and Kira Nerys from Star Trek: Deep Space Nine in the sixth episode, which visits the Deep Space 9 space station from that series.

The sixth episode visits the Deep Space 9 space station from Star Trek: Deep Space Nine. McMahan described the episode as "one last walk around Deep Space 9". He binge-watched episodes of that series before breaking the episode's story, to help decide which elements to include, and settled on a storyline featuring the Karemma from the episode "Starship Down". McMahan thought those aliens would "still be flirting with doing trade with the Federation" at this point in the timeline, about six years after Deep Space Nine ends. Similarly, he felt the character Kira Nerys would still be running the space station and wanted to feature her alongside main character Shaxs due to them both being Bajoran. The episode also brings back the Deep Space Nine character Quark, who had previously been referenced in Lower Decks as the owner of a bar franchise. The episode's title, "Hear All, Trust Nothing", is one of the Rules of Acquisition used by Ferengi such as Quark in Deep Space Nine. McMahan originally did not include Mariner in the Deep Space 9 visit because she used to serve on the space station and would not want to "go running back in there", but actress Tawny Newsome asked him to rewrite the episode's ending to include Mariner on the space station because Deep Space Nine is her favorite Star Trek series. The episode does not delve into key elements of Deep Space Nine such as the Dominion War or characters Benjamin and Jake Sisko, and McMahan acknowledged that the Karemma were not important characters from the series. He hoped Deep Space Nine fans would see the episode as a "little gift" that encouraged them to re-watch the series.

"A Mathematically Perfect Redemption" is the episode that McMahan felt was "truly [his] own" for the season, featuring the exocomp Peanut Hamper from the first-season finale. The episode begins with Peanut Hamper in space while the opening credits are shown instead of the normal title sequence. McMahan compared the character's interactions with the bird-like Areore to the films Dances with Wolves (1990), The Last Samurai (2003), and Avatar (2009), which he felt was new territory for Star Trek. He also compared Peanut Hamper's character arc to that of Maui from Moana (2016), though the episode ends with her "true nature" being confirmed as a "manipulative and cunning robot". This brings her into contact with the evil computer AGIMUS from the second season, setting up a continuation of their storyline in the fourth season.

After Mariner leaves Starfleet in the ninth episode, there is a time jump before the tenth episode during which she experiences life outside the organization. She realizes how important her family and friends are to her and that she would rather work to improve Starfleet's flawed systems. McMahan said because Mariner returns in the finale, she would not be threatening to leave again and would have to "figure out a way to make Starfleet work for her" moving forward. The exploration of Rutherford's implant continues an ongoing story from the second season that was inspired by the secret past of Deep Space Nine character Julian Bashir. This season reveals that Rutherford was given the implant by Admiral Buenamigo, who uses Rutherford's designs to create the fully automated Texas-class starships. Buenamigo is an example of the common Star Trek trope of antagonistic admirals, and is also part of the season's exploration of hierarchy and professional pressure in Starfleet. McMahan explained that there are a lot of exemplary Starfleet officers across the history of the franchise and characters like Buenamigo feel like they need to do something big to be able to stand out. This theme is further explored when the main characters learn that other California-class ships look up to the Cerritos, and when Freeman proposes "Project Swing By" to try prove that the California-class ships can be more than they are perceived to be by the rest of Starfleet. In the season finale, all of the California-class ships arrive to save the Cerritos from the Texas-class ships and the main characters accept the status of the California-class. Unlike the second-season finale, McMahan chose not to end the third-season finale with a cliffhanger so the fourth season could start "clean" with new stories.

=== Casting and voice recording ===
The series stars a group of ensigns that serve in the lower decks of the Cerritos: Tawny Newsome as Beckett Mariner, Jack Quaid as Brad Boimler, Noël Wells as D'Vana Tendi, and Eugene Cordero as Sam Rutherford. The ship's bridge crew, who have supporting roles, include Dawnn Lewis as Captain Carol Freeman, Jerry O'Connell as first officer Commander Jack Ransom, Fred Tatasciore as security chief Lieutenant Shaxs, and Gillian Vigman as chief medical officer Dr. T'Ana. Newsome began recording voice overs for the season in early June 2021. She was able to work in a recording studio for the season, which was not possible on the previous season due to the COVID-19 pandemic. However, she was still unable to record with Quaid, as she did on the first season, due to his commitments filming the series The Boys. Newsome said she had finished recording for the season by March 2022, and Cordero said in June that recording was mostly complete. Newsome was doing additional dialogue recording (ADR) for the season later that month at the same time as she was recording the fourth season.

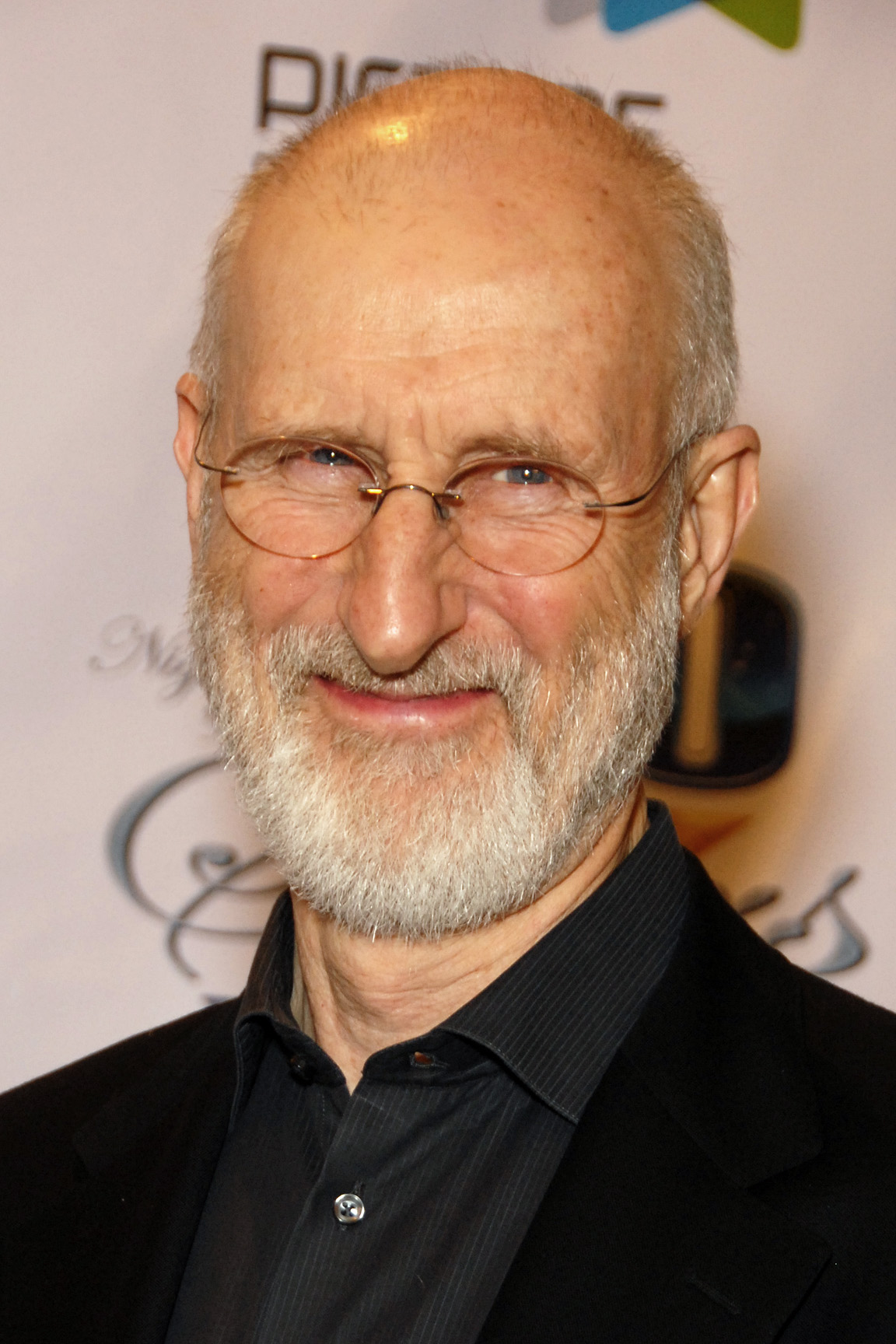
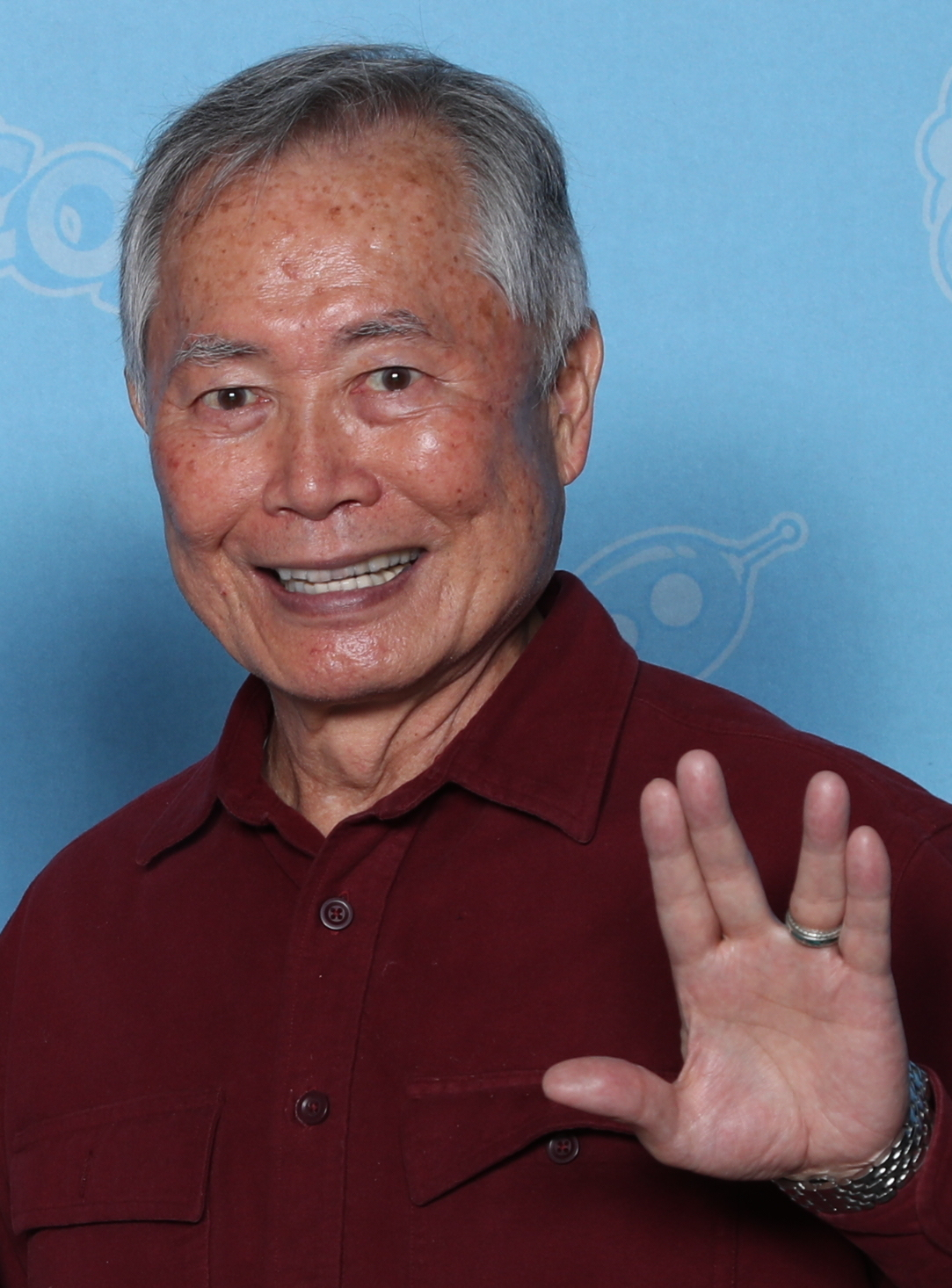
The season features several guest stars who reprise their roles from previous Star Trek media but voice alternate versions of their characters, including James Cromwell as a hologram of Zefram Cochrane and George Takei as a hallucination of Hikaru Sulu.

McMahan stated in May 2021 that there would be guest stars in the season who reprise their roles from previous Star Trek series, and they would be "people you're not going to expect when you get them" which he felt was more surprising and satisfying for fans than just bringing back the main cast of previous series. In April 2022, J.G. Hertzler was revealed to be reprising his role as Klingon Chancellor Martok from Deep Space Nine, though this is a virtual version of the character that is part of the tabletop game Bat'leths & BIHnuchs, a Klingon version of the real-world game Dungeons & Dragons. Hertzler also reprises his role as the Drookmani captain from the first season of Lower Decks. Similar to Hertzler's return as Martok, James Cromwell voices a holographic version of Zefram Cochrane, his character from Star Trek: First Contact (1996); Susan Gibney reprises her role as Dr. Leah Brahms from The Next Generation, who appears as a fantasy created by psychic objects; and George Takei reprises his original Star Trek role of Hikaru Sulu in a hallucination that Boimler has. Cromwell recorded his lines at home over Zoom, working around his filming commitments for the series Succession. Armin Shimerman and Nana Visitor reprise their respective Deep Space Nine roles as Quark and Kira Nerys for "Hear All, Trust Nothing". When recording the episode, Shimerman used the same prosthetic teeth that he wore during filming for that series to ensure that Lower Decks's Quark sounded the same.

Returning from earlier seasons are Phil LaMarr as Mariner's father, Admiral Alonzo Freeman; Nolan North as transporter chief Lars Lundy; Paul Scheer as chief engineer Andy Billups; Lauren Lapkus as Jennifer Sh'reyan, Mariner's Andorian girlfriend; writer Ben Rodgers as Lieutenant Steve Stevens; Carl Tart as Kayshon; Paul F. Tompkins as Dr. Migleemo; Jessica McKenna as Ensign Barnes as well as the Cerritos computer; Jeffrey Combs as the evil computer AGIMUS; Kether Donohue as the narcissistic exocomp Peanut Hamper; Michelle Wong as Admiral Wong; and Asif Ali, Mary Holland, and Artemis Pebdani as Delta Shift members Asif, Moxy, and Karavitus. Voicing other California-class captains in the season are the returning Sam Richardson as Vendome of the USS Inglewood and Al Rodrigo as Durango of the USS Merced, as well as new character Maier of the USS Carlsbad who is voiced by Baron Vaughn. Also introduced in the season is Admiral Les Buenamigo who is voiced by Carlos Alazraqui, the father of Star Trek: Prodigy star Rylee Alazraqui; and Georgia King's Petra Aberdeen, an archaeologist similar to the Next Generation character Vash who McMahan called "a cool, female, space Indiana Jones" and an appealing alternative to Starfleet for Mariner. Additionally, Gabrielle Ruiz briefly reprises her role as T'Lyn from the second season. When the third season was written, McMahan had not seen the positive fan reaction to the character and said he would have given her a bigger role in the season if he had. T'Lyn has a bigger role in future seasons.

=== Animation and design ===
Independent animation studio Titmouse provides the animation for the series, with Barry J. Kelly serving as supervising director. Animatics were produced by mid-October 2021, and the season was completed by mid-July 2022. The animation style reflects the look of "prime time animated comedy" series such as The Simpsons, but with more detailed backgrounds and environments than is traditional for prime time animation.

The character K'ranch, a new alien created for the series who is a weapons-loving Kromsapiod, was inspired by the Deep Space Nine character Tosk. K'ranch was created because the animation team wanted to make a new character that fit within the Star Trek franchise but also took advantage of the series' animated format more than alien species that were created for live-action do. His name is a combination of ketchup and ranch dressing. The season premiere recreates scenes and locations from Star Trek: First Contact as part of a tourist destination dedicated to the events of that film. McMahan explained that those events were logged by the crew of the Enterprise following the film which allowed Starfleet to accurately recreate them. "Mining the Mind's Mines" was inspired by "classic 'trapped-in-a-cave' planetary episode[s]" from previous Star Trek series which were often filmed on Stage 16 of the Paramount Pictures studio lot in Los Angeles. McMahan also took inspiration for the episode's setting from the muted colors of Star Trek comic books published by Gold Key Comics in the 1960s and 1970s. The opening of "Hear All, Trust Nothing" recreates the title sequence from Deep Space Nine by having the Cerritos slowly circle the space station. Each California-class ship in the finale is painted differently and the animators specifically did not want it to look like they used the same model for all of them, despite each ship having general design.

=== Music ===
Composer Chris Westlake chose not to create musical themes for individual characters in the series because of its themes of characters working together. Key scenes for him in the season included the arrival of the California-class ships and the embrace between Mariner and Freeman in the finale. For the First Contact homages in the season premiere, Jerry Goldsmith's main theme from that film can be heard along with the song "Magic Carpet Ride" by Steppenwolf, which was also used in the film. The main title theme from Deep Space Nine, composed by Dennis McCarthy, is heard when the Cerritos arrives at Deep Space 9 in "Hear All, Trust Nothing".

== Marketing ==
A teaser and first key art for the season were released during a panel for the series at the Star Trek: Mission Chicago convention in April 2022, part of a week of celebrations for "First Contact Day", marking the fictional holiday of April 5 when first contact between humans and aliens was made in the Star Trek universe. The panel included Newsome, Quaid, Wells, and O'Connell all in cosplay as their characters, as well as McMahan, and the cold open and first scene of a season three episode was also shown to the audience. Discussing the teaser that was released at the panel, Arezou Amin of Collider said it was vague but promised "more of the comedy the show has become known for" along with increased stakes from the previous seasons. Dylan Kelly at Yahoo! said it "offers a myriad of new challenges" for the main characters, including a "chaotic USS Cerritos hijacking".

The final key art was revealed in mid-July, along with the season premiere date, and continued a theme for the series of replicating classic Star Trek film posters. This poster pays homage to the one for Star Trek III: The Search for Spock (1984), with Rutherford's head taking the place of Spock's on the poster. McMahan said this poster was chosen because Rutherford's storyline for the season aligned with The Search for Spock's themes of loss and memories. Later that month, the season was discussed by cast and crew during the Star Trek Universe panel at San Diego Comic-Con, where a full trailer was revealed. Gizmodo's James Whitbrook called it a "delightful new trailer [that] teases a ton of weird and wonderful adventures", including "Romulans! Glistening abs! Klingons! Nightmare Klingons in clown makeup with bat'leths for arms! [And] an entire, extended gag" about the Deep Space Nine opening titles. Adam Bankhurst of IGN highlighted the Deep Space Nine references, as did Ross A. Lincoln at TheWrap who said the trailer "really panders hard to Deep Space Nine fans" by combing the "great tastes" of that series and Lower Decks. Witney Seibold, writing for /Film, noted the Deep Space Nine references and other jokes. He concluded, "We can't wait to spend more time with these goofballs". As they did with the previous seasons, animation studio Titmouse released a shirt with a unique design on it alongside each episode. The designs were available for one week each, and fans who bought all ten received a bonus eleventh shirt.

== Release ==
=== Streaming and broadcast ===
The season premiered on Paramount+ in the United States on August 25, 2022, and ran for 10 episodes. Each episode was broadcast in Canada on the same day as the U.S. release by Bell Media on specialty channel CTV Sci-Fi Channel before streaming on Crave. Amazon Prime Video has the streaming rights for several other territories, including Europe, Australia, New Zealand, Japan, and India. In February 2023, Paramount made a new deal with Prime Video for the series' international streaming rights. This allowed the season to be added to Paramount+ in some other countries in addition to remaining on Prime Video. In July 2023, Bell Media announced that the series would be leaving Crave over the following month. It would continue to be broadcast on CTV Sci-Fi and past seasons would remain available on CTV.ca and the CTV app. The season was made available for free in the U.S. for a limited time on YouTube, Prime Video, and Pluto TV in September 2023, coinciding with the fourth season's release. The Funny AF channel also ran a third-season marathon on September 8, which is Star Trek Day.

=== Home media ===
The season was released on DVD and Blu-Ray in the U.S. on April 25, 2023. The release includes bonus features, including a round-up of the references and Easter eggs to other Star Trek series in each episode, a featurette about the visit to Deep Space 9 in the episode "Hear All, Trust Nothing", and audio commentaries with cast and crew for several of the episodes.

== Reception ==
=== Critical response ===
Rotten Tomatoes reported 100% approval with an average rating of 8.00/10 based on 6 reviews.

=== Accolades ===
Writers for Ars Technica and CNET included Lower Decks on their lists of best television series for 2022.

Accolades received by Star Trek: Lower Decks season 3
Year	Award	Category	Nominee(s)	Result	Ref.
2023	Annie Awards	Best Editorial – TV/Media	Andy Maxwell, Zach Lamplugh, Brandon Brocker, Paul Mazzotta (for "The Stars At Night")	Nominated	
2023	Critics' Choice Television Awards	Best Animated Series	Star Trek: Lower Decks	Nominated	
2023	Astra Creative Arts TV Awards	Best Streaming Animated Series or TV Movie	Star Trek: Lower Decks	Nominated	
