= Star Trek: Lower Decks season 2 =

Star Trek: Lower Decks
- Season 2
- Promotional poster with art by Matt Ferguson, parodying a poster for the film Star Trek II: The Wrath of Khan (1982) by Bob Peak
- Showrunner: Mike McMahan
- Starring: Tawny Newsome; Jack Quaid; Noël Wells; Eugene Cordero; Dawnn Lewis; Jerry O'Connell; Fred Tatasciore; Gillian Vigman
- No. of episodes: 10

Release
- Original network: Paramount+
- Original release: August 12 – October 14, 2021

Season chronology
- ← Previous; Season 1 Next → Season 3

The second season of the American adult animated television series Star Trek: Lower Decks is set in the 24th century and follows the adventures of the low-ranking officers with menial jobs on the starship Cerritos, one of Starfleet's least important starships. The season was produced by CBS Eye Animation Productions in association with Secret Hideout, Important Science, Roddenberry Entertainment, and animation studio Titmouse, with Mike McMahan serving as showrunner and Barry J. Kelly as supervising director.

Tawny Newsome, Jack Quaid, Noël Wells, and Eugene Cordero voice the lower decks crew members of the Cerritos, with Dawnn Lewis, Jerry O'Connell, Fred Tatasciore, and Gillian Vigman providing voices for the ship's senior officers. Lower Decks was ordered for two seasons in October 2018 with McMahan on board as showrunner. Production took place remotely due to the COVID-19 pandemic and some of the season's writers did not meet in person while working on it. The season continues some overarching storylines from the first season, such as the threat of the Pakleds and the relationship between Beckett Mariner (Newsome) and her mother, Captain Carol Freeman (Lewis). Titmouse began work in August 2020. The season features many connections and references to past Star Trek media such as Star Trek: The Next Generation, including several actors returning as guest stars.

The season premiered on the streaming service Paramount+ on August 12, 2021, and ran for 10 episodes until October 14. It received positive reviews from critics, who felt it was a confident continuation that improved on the first season. This was despite concerns about the large number of Star Trek references and some criticisms of the season's sexual content. The penultimate episode, "wej Duj", was considered by some critics to be the best of the series and was nominated for a Hugo Award. A third season was ordered in April 2021.

== Episodes ==
Star Trek: Lower Decks season 2 episodes
| No. overall | No. in season | Title | Directed by | Written by | Original release date |
|---|---|---|---|---|---|
| 11 | 1 | "Strange Energies" | Jason Zurek | Mike McMahan | August 12, 2021 |
After Starfleet makes first contact with the planet Apergos, the USS Cerritos arrives for "second contact". While power-washing some buildings, Ensign Beckett Mariner—the daughter of Captain Carol Freeman—accidentally activates an ancient defense system that attacks her. It discharges a beam of energy that hits First Officer Jack Ransom and gives him god-like abilities. Ensign D'Vana Tendi becomes concerned that her friend Ensign Sam Rutherford's personality has drastically changed since he lost his memory and gained a new cyborg eye implant. She attempts to fix him with her medical equipment, but scares him off. Tendi decides to implement more extreme measures, but soon realizes how she is treating her friend and makes up with Rutherford. Ransom goes mad with his new power and creates a giant, floating head that goes into space and attacks the Cerritos. On the ground, Mariner kicks his headless body in the crotch, which diminishes his powers and eventually returns him to normal. On the USS Titan, Ensign Brad Boimler struggles while serving under Captain William Riker.
| 12 | 2 | "Kayshon, His Eyes Open" | Kim Arndt | Chris Kula | August 19, 2021 |
After a prominent member of the Collector's guild dies, the Cerritos is tasked with preparing his collection to be catalogued under the supervision of Collector Siggi. The Cerritos's new chief of security, Kayshon, joins the away team with Mariner, Tendi, Rutherford, and Jet Manhaver—an ensign who takes over Boimler's position and makes Mariner feel threatened. On the Titan, Boimler helps an away team survive a dangerous mission but is accidentally duplicated while he is being transported back to the ship. Unknown to Starfleet, Collector Siggi steals a rare mask from the collection which triggers the dead collector's automated defense mechanisms. These attack the away team and Kayshon is turned into a rag doll in the chaos. Freeman does not check in with the team following a leadership review that criticized her for micro-managing. Manhaver and Mariner clash over their different approaches to escaping, before realizing that they need to let Rutherford and Tendi take charge; the team makes it back to the Cerritos. Boimler returns to the Cerritos to keep him separate from his duplicate, William.
| 13 | 3 | "We'll Always Have Tom Paris" | Bob Suarez | M. Willis | August 26, 2021 |
Chief medical officer T'Ana sends Tendi to retrieve an important family heirloom, and Mariner joins her. After retrieving an old box, they decide to look at what is inside and find a "libido post" that Caitians like T'Ana use to relieve their annual need to have sex. The pair accidentally break the post and go on a mission to fix it, during which they realize that they do not know much about each other. They fail to fix the post, but T'Ana says that she only wanted the box. Rutherford is startled to see tactical officer Shaxs walking around the Cerritos after Shaxs had sacrificed his life to save Rutherford on an earlier mission. He is assured that members of Starfleet's bridge crews die and return in many different ways quite often, but still wants to know how Shaxs survived. When he finally builds up the courage to ask, Shaxs tells him something so horrifying that Rutherford is scarred forever. When Lieutenant Tom Paris boards the ship, Boimler wants to meet him and have Paris sign a commemorative plate with his face on it, but due to access issues he has to crawl through the Jefferies tube to get to the bridge.
| 14 | 4 | "Mugato, Gumato" | Jason Zurek | Ben Rodgers | September 2, 2021 |
Boimler and Rutherford learn from the Cerritos bartender that Mariner may be a Section 31 spy. When a rare Mugato is detected on a planet that it should not be on, the Cerritos is sent to investigate. Mariner, Boimler, and Rutherford join Shaxs and the away team. They discover many Mugatos that are being kept captive by Ferengi who are harvesting and selling the animals' horns. The away team attacks and the Mugatos are released, but Boimler and Rutherford get lost in the chaos. The Ferengi's buyer attempts to escape and is captured by the Cerritos, which accidentally destroys his ship. Not realizing who he is, Freeman compensates him with a shuttle and some valuable items before learning that this was a scam. Boimler and Rutherford find Mariner, who they believe is a terrifying spy, but she convinces them that she is not. Together they convince the Ferengi to change their operation into a Mugato sanctuary and profit off visitors. On the Cerritos, Tendi is tasked with tracking down and scanning crew members who have been avoiding their regular medical checkups.
| 15 | 5 | "An Embarrassment of Dooplers" | Kim Arndt | Dave Ihlenfeld & David Wright | September 9, 2021 |
The USS Cerritos escorts a Doopler emissary to Starbase 25. Dooplers involuntarily duplicate when embarrassed so the crew go out of their way to keep him comfortable, but Freeman accidentally embarrasses the emissary and he begins to uncontrollably duplicate throughout the ship. She realizes that this will reverse if he gets angry and orders the crew to insult him. Mariner plans to get her and Boimler into a party at the starbase using Boimler's clone's invitation, but only Boimler is given entry and Mariner reveals how hurt she was that he abandoned her to work on the Titan. Boimler decides to leave the party and join Mariner at a dive bar. Tendi and Rutherford work on rebuilding a favorite model ship of theirs. Rutherford is frustrated that he cannot rebuild it as easily as he did before he lost his memories, until Tendi explains that he designed the ship model to always be incomplete so they could spend time together. Freeman and the senior officers are shut out of the party and ignored by the other captains. They join Mariner and Boimler at the dive bar, where famous Starfleet officers Kirk and Spock once drank.
| 16 | 6 | "The Spy Humongous" | Bob Suarez | John Cochran | September 16, 2021 |
The crew take in a Pakled refugee, but come to suspect him of being an inept spy. Freeman orders Ransom and Kayshon to keep him busy while she attempts to negotiate a ceasefire with Pakled leadership. She becomes frustrated with their unclear leadership structure. The ensigns are ordered to clean up dangerous and unpredictable mission anomalies left over by the crew, but Boimler is invited to join a group calling themselves the "Red Shirts" who have ambitions of higher ranks and are interested in Boimler's Titan experience. They give Boimler a makeover, urge him to distance himself from his friends, and spend all of their time talking about the crisis leadership skills they think they have. When Tendi merges with an artifact and turns into a large scorpion-like creature, Boimler makes a fool of himself to make Tendi laugh and return her to normal. The Red Shirts express distaste for Boimler's actions, but he tells them that true captains take action to help their friends and crew. Freeman gets the spy to reveal that the Pakleds are planning to attack Earth with a Veruvian bomb.
| 17 | 7 | "Where Pleasant Fountains Lie" | Jason Zurek | Garrick Bernard | September 23, 2021 |
Queen Paolana, ruler of Hysperia—a Renaissance-style society from a planet that was colonized by fantasy enthusiasts—hails the Cerritos to ask for help from her son, chief engineer Andarithio Billups. Billups reluctantly agrees to look at her ship's engines. He is wary of his mother's repeated attempts to lure him back to their kingdom by having him lose his virginity, which, by Hysperian tradition, would result in him ascending to the throne as king. Boimler is disappointed after he is reassigned from an exciting field mission to a seemingly less interesting one with Mariner, escorting a malevolent artificial intelligence named AGIMUS to Earth. Their ship crash lands on a desert planet, where AGIMUS attempts to sow discord by revealing that Mariner had Boimler reassigned because she did not believe he was capable of the field mission. Boimler tricks AGIMUS into powering a distress signal, impressing Mariner who apologizes to Boimler. When Billups believes that Paolana is killed in an explosion, he prepares to lose his virginity and ascend to the throne, but this was a ruse and Rutherford stops Billups in time.
| 18 | 8 | "I, Excretus" | Kim Arndt | Ann Kim | September 30, 2021 |
Friction between the lower decks crew and senior officers grows when several lower decks crew members are accidentally left behind during a spacewalk repair mission. Shari yn Yem, a Starfleet drill instructor, oversees a series of holodeck drills to build better understanding among the crew. They all fail their assigned drills except for Boimler, who achieves high marks but obsessively reruns the drill in an attempt to achieve a perfect score. Mariner and Freeman's disagreements cause the team to fail a simple docking drill in record time, and they come to better appreciate one another. They suspect that the drills were rigged for failure to bring them all together, but Shari reveals that this was actually a bid to ensure her continued employment. The Cerritos is likely to be decommissioned if she submits the failing results, but Boimler's continued running of his drill buys time for Freeman and the crew to demonstrate that they are more than capable. Shari changes their score to passing. Freeman and the senior officers apologize to the lower decks crew by providing them with a senior officer food replicator.
| 19 | 9 | "wej Duj" | Bob Suarez | Kathryn Lyn | October 7, 2021 |
On the Klingon ship IKS Che'Ta, lower decks officer Ma'ah hopes to become the second officer to Captain Dorg. He earns Dorg's respect through violence and accompanies him to a meeting with the Pakleds, where he is disturbed to learn that Dorg has been supplying the Pakleds with weapons including Veruvian bombs for use against Earth. On the Vulcan cruiser Sh'vhal, lower decks officer T'Lyn is criticized by her captain and fellow crew for her emotional reasoning, but is able to convince them to investigate an anomaly in the sector. T'Lyn has detected the Pakleds' testing of the Veruvian bombs, which the Cerritos also detects and investigates. The Pakleds and the Che'Ta attack the Cerritos, which is saved by the arrival of the Sh'vhal. Aboard the Che'Ta, Ma'ah challenges Dorg's dishonorable use of the Pakleds and his insubordination of the Klingon High Council's wishes, killing him in battle and replacing him as captain. He orders the Che'Ta to retreat while the Pakleds also flee. Despite her success, T'Lyn is punished for her continued emotional transgressions by being transferred to a Starfleet ship.
| 20 | 10 | "First First Contact" | Jason Zurek | Mike McMahan | October 14, 2021 |
The Cerritos is assigned to assist the USS Archimedes and Captain Sonya Gomez in a first-contact mission. A solar flare results in the Archimedes losing power and being pulled into a planet's gravity well, but a modified Cerritos stabilizes the Archimedes with a tractor beam. Meanwhile, Freeman has been offered a promotion which will take her off the Cerritos; Mariner, overhearing this and fearing abandonment, spreads the word to the senior staff who begin to bicker with Freeman. Tendi learns that she is being removed from sickbay staff and worries, until Dr. T'Ana explains that she is being wasted there and will be promoted to the sciences division. Rutherford begins having trouble with his cybernetic implant, which is running out of storage space, and admits to Billups that he makes triple backups of his memories of Tendi because he is unwilling to lose their friendship. When he decides to delete his redundant memories, he sees a previously hidden memory that suggests his cybernetic implant was installed against his wishes. Later, Freeman is arrested for allegedly detonating a Veruvian bomb on Pakled Planet.

== Cast and characters ==
=== Main ===
- Tawny Newsome as Beckett Mariner
- Jack Quaid as Brad Boimler
- Noël Wells as D'Vana Tendi
- Eugene Cordero as Sam Rutherford
- Dawnn Lewis as Carol Freeman
- Jerry O'Connell as Jack Ransom
- Fred Tatasciore as Shaxs
- Gillian Vigman as T'Ana

=== Recurring ===
- Phil LaMarr as Admiral Freeman
- Lauren Lapkus as Jennifer Sh'reyan
- Jessica McKenna as Barnes
- Ben Rodgers as Steve Stevens
- Rich Fulcher as the Pakleds
- Carl Tart as Kayshon
- Paul Scheer as Andy Billups

=== Notable guests ===
- Jonathan Frakes as William Riker
- Marcus Henderson as Jet Manhaver
- Paul F. Tompkins as Migleemo
- Robert Duncan McNeill as Tom Paris
- Jeffrey Combs as AGIMUS
- Alice Krige as the Borg Queen
- Lycia Naff as Sonya Gomez

== Production ==
=== Development ===
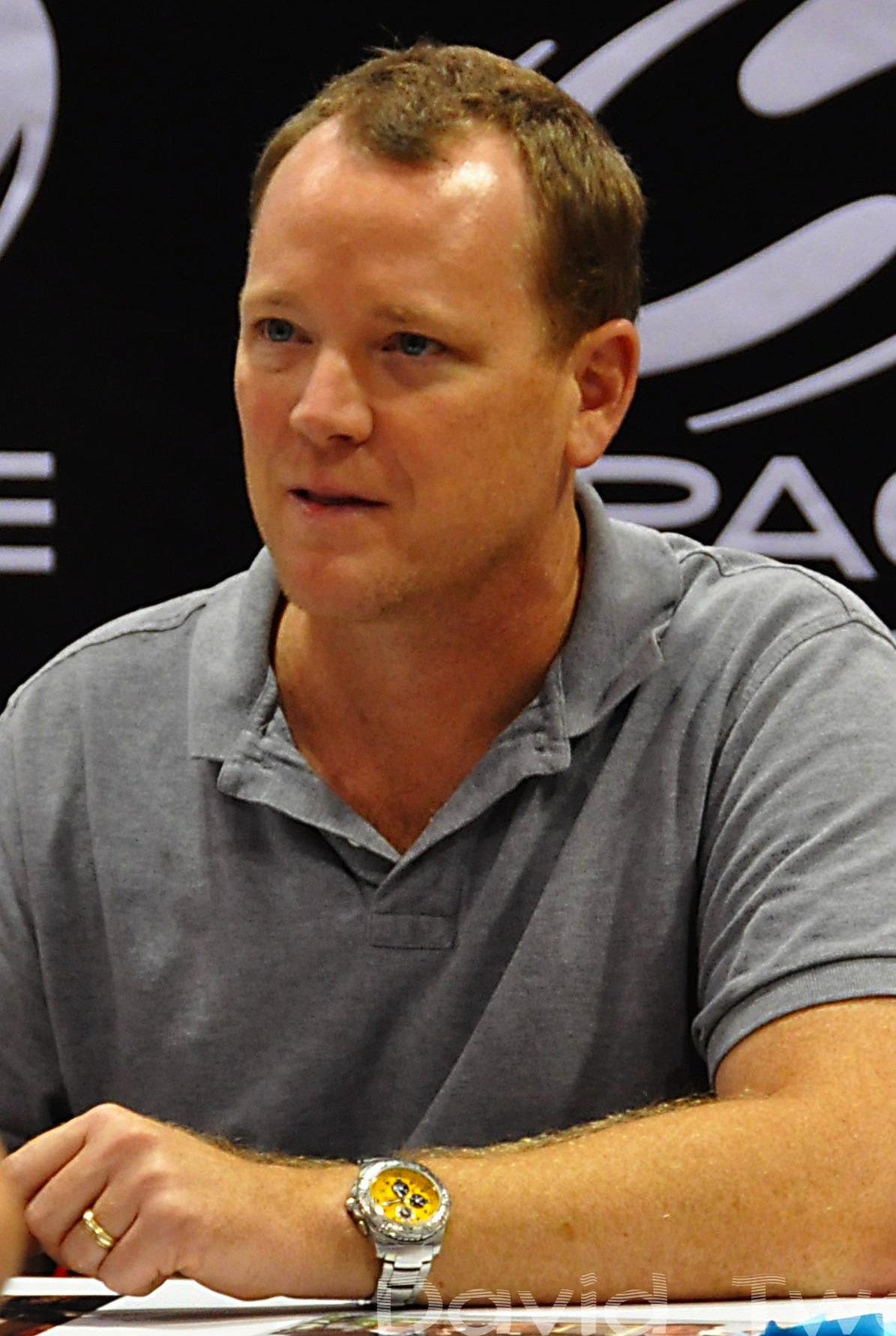
Star Trek: Voyager star Robert Duncan McNeill reprised his role as Tom Paris for the episode "We'll Always Have Tom Paris", which is the 800th episode of Star Trek produced for television.

CBS All Access officially ordered two seasons of Star Trek: Lower Decks in October 2018. Mike McMahan was set as showrunner for the series. By late March 2020, work on the series was taking place remotely due to the COVID-19 pandemic forcing staff to work from home. Executive producer Alex Kurtzman said in August that work on the season was "barreling ahead, full steam ahead", and had not been delayed by the pandemic unlike the live-action Star Trek series Discovery, Picard, and Strange New Worlds. A month later, ViacomCBS announced that CBS All Access would be expanded and rebranded as Paramount+ in March 2021. The season's third episode, "We'll Always Have Tom Paris", is the 800th Star Trek episode produced for television.

=== Writing ===
Writing for the second season began by March 2020, and was completed by mid-September. Due to the pandemic, the whole season was written remotely using Zoom and some new writers did not meet the others in person while working on the season. It was written knowing that fans would be able to stream the first two seasons back-to-back; McMahan wanted to carry the energy of the first season's final three episodes into the start of the second season, feeling that those episodes were when the writing team settled into the right approach for the series. Because the second season was mostly written before the first was released, the writers were not able to take fan responses into account and had to trust that the first season would be positively received.

McMahan said the second season would combine standalone episodes with season-long character arcs, and would take inspiration from the storytelling of Star Trek: Voyager and Star Trek: Deep Space Nine in addition to that of Star Trek: The Next Generation. He said many members of the crew had seen all of the previous Star Trek series, but they revisited specific episodes together. This included the Star Trek: The Original Series episode "A Private Little War", which introduced the alien Mugatos. Writer Ben Rodgers "could not get over" the inconsistent pronunciation of "Mugato" in the episode, a production mistake that the Lower Decks team wanted to celebrate, so the episode "Mugato, Gumato" has a running joke about the different pronunciations. McMahan said the second season would not undo the end of the first, which saw Brad Boimler working on the USS Titan. He compared this to storylines on the series Farscape which took its characters away from the main starship. Other elements that were left for the second season include Sam Rutherford's memory issues, Beckett Mariner working with her mother Captain Carol Freeman, and the Pakleds being a threat. McMahan wanted to address LGBT characters and relationships better than in the first season, especially by more explicitly depicting Mariner as bisexual.

The writers had a mandate from McMahan for the season to elevate the characters D'Vana Tendi and Sam Rutherford so they were true co-leads of the series alongside Mariner and Boimler. He wanted to explore new character combinations, such as telling a story with Mariner and Tendi together, which some critics had called for after they did not have any episodes together in the first season. The pair go on a mission together in "We'll Always Have Tom Paris", in which the characters make a joke acknowledging that it was a "glaring omission" for them to have not teamed-up before then. The episode's title is a reference to the Next Generation episode "We'll Always Have Paris", which itself was a reference to the line "We'll always have Paris" from the film Casablanca (1942). McMahan also wanted some episodes to focus on supporting characters such as Dr. T'Ana and chief engineer Billups—the latter being a "secret sleeper favorite" character for the writers. He was wary of changing the main characters so much that they got too close to characters and storylines that previous Star Trek series had already covered, and hoped to develop the main characters across the seasons without departing too much from the central premise of the series. An underlying theme for the season is the characters learning to trust each other, and it ends with Mariner successfully opening up to her mother. Freeman begins the season feeling that she should move up to "bigger and better places", but learns by the finale that she is in the right place on the Cerritos. That is another underlying theme for the season, which Freeman voices with the line "the carpets are greyer on the other side of the ship". Boimler has a similar journey in the season, wanting to be on the Titan but ending up happy to rejoin the Cerritos. Freeman's arc connects to the season-long Pakled story, which ends with her being arrested for apparently destroying the Pakled homeworld. This ends the season on a cliffhanger, setting up a new character arc for Mariner in the third season. Late in production on the finale, McMahan realized that this cliffhanger should include the "To Be Continued..." title card that previous Star Trek series used.

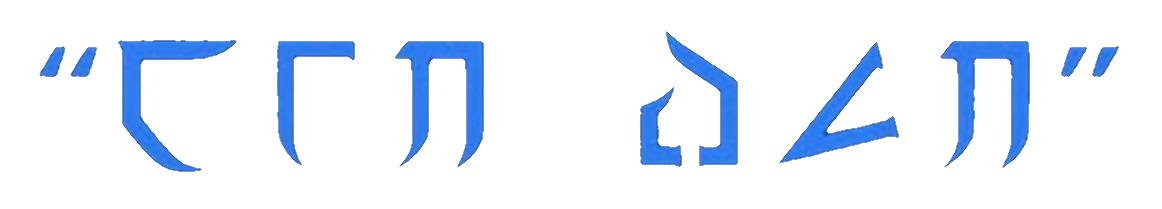
The title card for "wej Duj", which means "Three Ships" in the Klingon language, is shown with Klingon characters in a first for the franchise.

McMahan hoped to replicate the success of the first season's last three episodes by again having a sketch comedy episode ("I, Excretus"), a penultimate episode that breaks form for the series ("wej Duj"), and a big finale ("First First Contact"). The idea of "wej Duj", which means "Three Ships" in the Klingon language, came from the writers wanting to do something that had not been seen before and being surprised to learn that no previous series had told a contained story on a Vulcan ship. The episode shows "more lower decks than ever before" by exploring lower decks crew on the Cerritos, a Vulcan ship, and a Klingon ship. McMahan said this was the kind of story he would pitch if given the opportunity to make a Star Trek film, and described the episode as a "triple-mini-movie that's part [Star Trek VI: The Undiscovered Country (1991)], part this Vulcan thing we've never seen before", and also ties-into the season-long Pakled storyline. One element that he was not able to include, due to logistics, was having the full opening credits written in alternating Vulcan and Klingon text, but he was able to have the episode title shown in Klingon characters. This was a first for the franchise. For the finale, McMahan wanted a big moment that did not involve crashing the ship since that had already been done many times before in the franchise. Instead, for the first time in Star Trek, the hull plating is stripped from the whole ship. This was inspired by debris getting stuck in the hull of the USS Enterprise in the Star Trek: Enterprise episode "Minefield". The finale also introduces Cetacean Ops, an area of the starship for water-based crewmembers. It was first mentioned in the Next Generation episodes "Yesterday's Enterprise" and "The Perfect Mate" and was detailed in the Star Trek: The Next Generation Technical Manual by Rick Sternbach and Michael Okuda, but was never shown in that series due to the budgetary and logistical limitations of 1980s television. McMahan said it was a life-long dream come true to finally see Cetacean Ops on screen.

=== Casting and voice recording ===
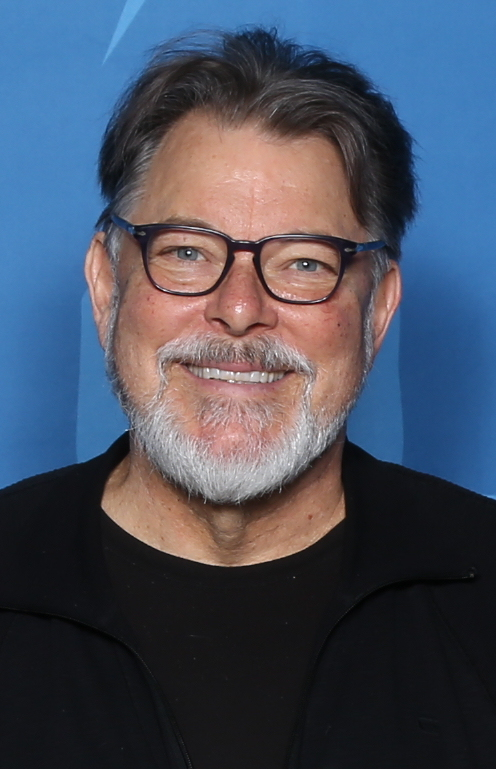
After guest starring in the first-season finale, Jonathan Frakes returned for the second season as his Star Trek: The Next Generation character William Riker.

The series stars a group of ensigns that serve in the lower decks of the Cerritos: Tawny Newsome as Beckett Mariner, Jack Quaid as Brad Boimler, Noël Wells as D'Vana Tendi, and Eugene Cordero as Sam Rutherford. The ship's bridge crew, who have supporting roles, include Dawnn Lewis as Captain Carol Freeman, Jerry O'Connell as first officer Commander Jack Ransom, Fred Tatasciore as security chief Lieutenant Shaxs, and Gillian Vigman as chief medical officer Dr. T'Ana. After Shaxs died in the first-season finale, the second season introduces a new security chief, Kayshon, who is voiced by comedian Carl Tart. The season also depicts Shaxs returning to life in a storyline that plays on the numerous times that characters have been resurrected in Star Trek.

After Jonathan Frakes guest starred in the first-season finale, reprising his role of William Riker from The Next Generation, McMahan confirmed that Frakes would return as Riker for the second season. Marina Sirtis also reprised her Next Generation role of Deanna Troi in the first-season finale, but she did not return for the second season which McMahan said was for story reasons. He added that there would be other characters in the season returning from previous Star Trek series, and said they would "come in a way that you don't expect". Robert Duncan McNeill, who portrayed Tom Paris in Voyager, reprises his role and also voices a commemorative plate of Paris that talks to a hallucinating Boimler, while Alice Krige returns as the Borg Queen from the film Star Trek: First Contact (1996), and Lycia Naff reprises her Next Generation guest role of Sonya Gomez. McMahan brought back Naff to have a callback that was not to one of the major Next Generation characters, and because he considered her to be "one of the original lower deckers". Additionally, Jeffrey Combs—who previously portrayed multiple characters across the franchise—voices an evil computer named AGIMUS; the evil entity Armus from the Next Generation episode "Skin of Evil" briefly appears, voiced by Tatasciore who took over from original voice actor Ron Gans; and the character Thadiun Okona from the Next Generation episode "The Outrageous Okona" makes a non-speaking cameo appearance as the DJ at a Starfleet party.

Other first-season cast members who returned for the second include Phil LaMarr as Admiral Freeman, Mariner's father; Lauren Lapkus as Jennifer Sh'reyan, an Andorian ensign on the Cerritos; Jessica McKenna as Ensign Barnes as well as the Cerritos computer; writer Ben Rodgers as Lieutenant Steve Stevens; Rich Fulcher as many of the Pakleds, including the Pakled leader, King Pakled, and Emperor of the Pakleds; Marcus Henderson as Lieutenant Jet Manhaver; Paul F. Tompkins as Dr. Migleemo; and Paul Scheer as chief engineer Andy Billups.

Voice recording for the season primarily took place with the actors in their own homes due to the COVID-19 pandemic. Newsome used a recording studio she already had at her house, and recording equipment was set up in the houses of other actors. However, Combs recorded his lines for the season in a traditional recording studio under pandemic precautions.

=== Animation and design ===
Independent animation studio Titmouse provides the animation for the series, with first-season episodic director Barry J. Kelly taking over from Juno Lee as supervising director for the second season. Work on the season's storyboards began in August 2020. These were put together as animatics for the animators to use as a basis for the final animation with full details and colors. The season's animation was in the final color phase by May 2021. The series' animation style reflects the look of "prime time animated comedy" series such as The Simpsons, but with more detailed backgrounds and environments than is traditional for prime time animation.

The model for the USS Cerritos features some "minor cosmetic changes" following the battle damage it received during the first-season finale. In "Strange Energies", the USS MacDuff appears in a holodeck program and is a Miranda-class ship like the USS Reliant from the film Star Trek II: The Wrath of Khan (1982), McMahan's favorite Star Trek starship and the inspiration for the Cerritos's design. The two other main ships in "wej Duj" are the IKS Che'Ta, a Klingon Bird of Prey like those seen throughout the franchise, and the Vulcan cruiser Sh'Vhal which has a similar design to the Vulcan ships seen in Star Trek: Enterprise. The season finale introduces the USS Archimedes, an Obena-class starship inspired by the Excelsior-class from Star Trek III: The Search for Spock (1984) but bigger and with some small design changes. The new class was named for Nollan Obena, the series' art director who designed many of its starships. Also seen in the season is Starbase 25, which was mentioned in Star Trek: The Animated Series but not seen on screen until "An Embarrassment of Dooplers". The design closely resembles that of Starbase Vanguard from the Star Trek: Vanguard book series. Inside the Starbase is a Quark's Bar like the one seen in Deep Space Nine, which has become a franchise since the events of that series—Quark's Bars also appear on other planets in Lower Decks. Tendi gives Rutherford a model of Deep Space 9 in "An Embarrassment of Dooplers" that comes in a box with the same typography as the Deep Space Nine credits.

Promotional poster for "Kayshon, His Eyes Open" showing some of the many visual references that the season makes to other parts of the Star Trek franchise.

McMahan hoped that references to The Animated Series in Lower Decks would honor it as the franchise's first animated series, and included several alien species from The Animated Series in the season: a Kzinti ensign, whose species first appeared in The Animated Series, is introduced, and in "The Spy Humongous" he mimics the "stooped posture" of the Kzinti character seen in that series; Starbase 25 features many different species, including a bartender of the same species as the character Em/3/Green and some bird-like Aurelians which both originated on The Animated Series; and the holodeck instructor Shari Yn Yem in "I, Excretus" is a Pandronian, a species from The Animated Series that has a distinctive style of talking, unique costume, and can split themselves into three parts. The season also features the skeleton of "Spock Two", a giant clone of Spock from the Animated Series episode "The Infinite Vulcan". The skeleton appears as part of the collection that is being catalogued in "Kayshon, His Eyes Open", which also includes numerous visual references to many previous Star Trek series.

The season begins with Mariner being interrogated by Cardassians in a holodeck program that is similar to the Next Generation episode "Chain of Command". In "I, Excretus", the crew of the Cerritos participate in holodeck training programs based on previous Starfleet missions that pay homage to the sets and events of episodes from other Star Trek series: "Mirror Universe Encounter" is set in the Mirror Universe and based on the Original Series episode "Mirror, Mirror"; "Old West Planet" has the Western theme of multiple previous episodes but the specific planet design of the Original Series episode "Spectre of the Gun"; "Naked Time" features visual references to both the Original Series episode "The Naked Time" and the Next Generation episode "The Naked Now"; "Medical Ethics" has a similar plot to the Next Generation episode "Ethics"; "The Good of the Many" replicates the set, costumes, and scenario of the scene where Spock has to fix the radioactive warp core in Star Trek II: The Wrath of Khan; "Escape from Spacedock" requires the crew to fly a starship out of a spacedock and save Spock on the Genesis Planet, just like in the plot of Star Trek III: The Search for Spock; and "Borg Encounter" adapts various elements from previous Borg-focused episodes as well as Star Trek: First Contact. Additionally, Dr. T'Ana and Tendi go rock climbing in "wej Duj" on a holodeck simulation of El Capitan in Yosemite National Park, recreating the scene where James T. Kirk does the same in Star Trek V: The Final Frontier (1989).

Rutherford has a vision in "We'll Always Have Tom Paris" of alternate versions of Shaxs wearing different costumes from across the franchise, including a USS Enterprise (NX-01) uniform from Enterprise; a Terran Empire uniform from the Original Series episode "Mirror, Mirror"; a Professor Moriarty costume similar to the one seen in the Next Generation episode "Elementary, Dear Data"; an Original Series "redshirt" uniform; and as a Borg. In "wej Duj", the crew are seen running through the ship wearing various outfits including Anbo-jyutsu martial arts costumes and gymnastics leotards from the Next Generation episodes "The Icarus Factor" and "The Price", respectively. Also in that episode, Boimler wears the same "Go climb a rock" shirt that Kirk wore in The Final Frontier, and uses the same rocket boots that Spock had in that film's rock climbing scene, while Freeman wears a shirt with "RITOS" on it which is similar to the "DISCO" shirts worn aboard the USS Discovery in Star Trek: Discovery. An alien based on the multi-eyed original design for Saru from Discovery briefly appears on Starbase 25. The evil computer AGIMUS is taken to the Daystrom Institute for Advanced Robotics in "Where Pleasant Fountains Lie". The institute was first seen in Star Trek: Picard, and is shown to look roughly the same during Lower Decks a few decades earlier than that appearance. One of the other evil computers in the institute features the CBS Eye logo as a reference to the series' production company.

=== Music ===
Composer Chris Westlake was unable to record his score for the first season with a full orchestra in a traditional recording studio, due to the COVID-19 pandemic, but he was able to with his score for the second season. Recording for the season began by May 2021 at the Sony Scoring Stage in Los Angeles with a live 60-person orchestra. The series' main theme was re-recorded with the full orchestra for the second season. The "Klingon acid punk" records that are featured in the episode "We'll Always Have Tom Paris" have lyrics written by Westlake and translated into the Klingon language by its creator, Mark Okrand. Similar to how Boimler is heard humming Jerry Goldsmith's main theme from The Next Generation during the first season, he can be heard humming Goldsmith's main theme from Voyager in "We'll Always Have Tom Paris" after talking about Paris and the crew of the USS Voyager from that series. Selections from Westlake's score for the season were included in the series' Vol. 1 soundtrack, which was released by Lakeshore Records on October 8, 2021.

== Marketing ==
The cast and crew teased the season during a virtual Star Trek Universe panel for New York Comic Con in October 2020. This panel primarily discussed the first-season finale and was released as an episode of The Ready Room, an aftershow hosted by The Next Generation actor Wil Wheaton. McMahan teased the season later in October during the Virtual Trek Con 2 event. A teaser trailer for the season was released during the "First Contact Day" virtual event on April 5, 2021, celebrating the franchise on the fictional holiday marking first contact between humans and aliens in the Star Trek universe. The season's premiere date was also revealed during that event.

The official trailer was released during Paramount+'s animation panel at the 2021 Comic-Con@Home virtual convention. McMahan and the cast discussed the season. Writing for Digital Spy, Dan Seddon described the trailer as a "wonderfully entertaining 2-minute package [that] has everything from space slugs to evil computers". Scott Collura at IGN said the trailer looked like "more of the same" fun as the first season and had "the usual dose of deep, deep Star Trek references and Easter eggs", while James Whitbrook of Gizmodo said the series was "looking better than ever for round two. And that means more jokes, more delectably silly references to Trek's past, and more earnest Starfleet vibes". Collura and Whitbrook both highlighted the Tom Paris commemorative plate featured in the trailer, which was also released as a physical commemorative plate for purchase. As they did with the first season, animation studio Titmouse released a shirt with a unique design on it alongside each episode. The designs were available for one week each, and fans who bought all ten received a bonus eleventh shirt.

== Release ==
=== Streaming and broadcast ===
The season premiered on Paramount+ in the United States on August 12, 2021, and ran for 10 episodes until October 14. Each episode was broadcast in Canada on the same day as the U.S. release by Bell Media on specialty channels CTV Sci-Fi Channel (English) and Z (French) before streaming on Crave. Prime Video has the streaming rights for several territories, including Europe, Australia, New Zealand, Japan, and India. In February 2023, Paramount made a new deal with Prime Video for the series' international streaming rights. This allowed the season to be added to Paramount+ in some other countries in addition to remaining on Prime Video. In July 2023, Bell Media announced that the series would be leaving Crave over the following month. It would continue to be broadcast on CTV Sci-Fi and past seasons would remain available on CTV.ca and the CTV app.

=== Home media ===
The season was released on DVD and Blu-Ray in the U.S. on July 12, 2022. The release includes over an hour of bonus features, including the animatics for each episode, a round-up of the references and Easter eggs to other Star Trek series in each episode, featurettes about the sound design process and the making of the season in general, and audio commentaries with cast and crew for several of the episodes.

== Reception ==
=== Critical response ===
Rotten Tomatoes reported 100% approval with an average rating of 8.30/10 based on 12 reviews. The website's critical consensus reads, "Lower Decks rights the ship with a more self-assured sophomore season that strikes an ideal balance between affection and irreverence."

Reviewing the first five episodes of the season, Brandon Zachary of Comic Book Resources praised the series for using its Star Trek references to develop the characters and story. He felt the season was more confident than the first, which Collider's Liz Shannon Miller and IGN's Tara Bennett also thought. They both said the season avoided fan concerns by balancing love for Star Trek with fun and improved stories. An example of the improved storytelling for Bennet was the handling of Boimler in the first five episodes, which impressed her because she felt other comedy series would not explore the ramifications of a decision like Boimler leaving the ship at the end of the first season. Bennet did criticize the amount of franchise references and hoped the second-half of the season would focus on more original material, like the Doopler race introduced in "An Embarrassment of Dooplers". Ben Pearson at /Film said the series continued to be an enjoyable entry in the franchise despite feeling that the amount of Star Trek references were becoming difficult to ignore for more casual fans. Writing for The A.V. Club, Zack Handlen said watching the series had the comforting feeling of watching "a rerun you haven't watched yet" and was a positive example of fan service, despite the constant references becoming tiresome at times. He thought the second season was more focused and consistent than the first, had better jokes, and handled episodic storytelling and overall continuity as well as, if not better than, some of the live-action Star Trek series. Handlen wished the series was more ambitious, though, saying it was easy to recommend to Star Trek fans who know the references but "it's hard not to hope that it might one day reach a little higher than 'Hey, remember the one where...'"

Shamus Kelley of Den of Geek disliked the series' first episode, but was encouraged to watch the rest and was "in love with the show" by the middle of the second season. He attributed this to the character development, more intelligent use of Star Trek references, and because the series "stopped trying to be Rick and Morty". Discussing the full second season, Keith R. A. DeCandido at Tor.com said it was coming into its own as a "proper" Star Trek series and was much stronger than the first season, primarily because it "allowed itself to be a Star Trek show, albeit one that was filled with humor and ridiculousness". Despite this, he thought the season struggled with the same inconsistent tone as the first and said it still relied too much on references and "dumb office-sitcom plots". Andrew Cunningham at Ars Technica said the amount of Star Trek references "can get tiring in large doses", and questioned how well the series worked for people who do not know the franchise, but as a fan the series was giving him the fun, episodic storytelling with low stakes that he wanted from Star Trek. A. J. Black, reviewing the season for Cultural Conversation, said it had the "brightest springing step" of all the modern Star Trek series' second seasons by maintaining consistency with its first season while also amplifying what worked best the first time. He said the second-half of the season was stronger than the first, and praised the season finale as the best of any Star Trek series since Voyager's third-season finale "Scorpion" in 1997. This was because of its combination of a "strong central, time-focused crisis", franchise references, and the development of Mariner's relationship with Freeman. Black thought "wej Duj" was overshadowed by the season finale, but he still praised it for taking the series to a new level in a comparative way to the Next Generation episode "Q Who" and the Deep Space Nine episode "Duet". "wej Duj" was considered to be the best episode of the series by multiple commenters.

Zachary said the season's "clean animation" complimented the writing and acting, while Handlen described the animation as "consistently inventive and gorgeous throughout, managing the neat trick of being hilarious and awe-inspiring as needed". Black also praised the "beautifully drawn" animation. Cunningham said the season benefitted from having the likeable characters that were introduced in the first season, and Zachary said the cast were "uniformly strong" in their roles. Handlen particurlay praised the supporting cast, including Lewis and O'Connell. Bennett praised the development of Mariner, saying the character was "more fun to be around" and appreciating that her relationship with Freeman is addressed in the season. Bennet was also thankful for the expanded roles that Tendi and Rutherford have, something that Pearson agreed with despite concerns with that pair's dynamic in the season's first episode. DeCandido said Mariner and her habit of always saving the day was one of his biggest issues with the first season and he was glad to see that change in the second. He praised the character development for Boimler and Tendi, and highlighted the guest cast including Combs. He thought some of the supporting characters, such as Kayshon, Jet, and Jennifer, were underused in the season.

Despite giving a positive review of the season, Black was critical of the episode "Mugato, Gumato" that he said was "rooted around a fairly graphic Mugato sex scene". In response to concerns about the scene, McMahan said he thought the scene was funny and there was a lot of other content in the series that was not family-friendly. He added, "I've never seen Star Trek as celebrating puritanism. I think that Star Trek has always embraced sexuality, humanism, and all sorts of great stuff". Another explicit scene in the season that received criticism is when Mariner walks in on an orgy in "I, Excretus" and says a naked Boimler with his legs spread. When asked about this scene, Quaid responded that he was used to that sort of content after starring in the series The Boys. McMahan said the scene was consistent with nudity and sexual content in the live-action Star Trek series.

=== Accolades ===
Accolades received by Star Trek: Lower Decks season 2
| Year | Award | Category | Nominee(s) | Result | Ref. |
|---|---|---|---|---|---|
| 2022 | Golden Reel Awards | Outstanding Achievement in Sound Editing – Animation Series or Short | James Lucero, James Singleton, Mak Kellerman, Michael LaFerla, and Michael Britt (for "Strange Energies") | Nominated | |
| 2022 | Hollywood Critics Association TV Awards | Best Streaming Animated Series or TV Movie | Star Trek: Lower Decks | Nominated | |
| 2022 | Hugo Awards | Best Dramatic Presentation, Short Form | Bob Suarez and Kathryn Lyn (for "wej Duj") | Nominated | |
| 2022 | Saturn Awards | Best Animated Series | Star Trek: Lower Decks | Nominated | |
