= Kether Donohue =

American actress

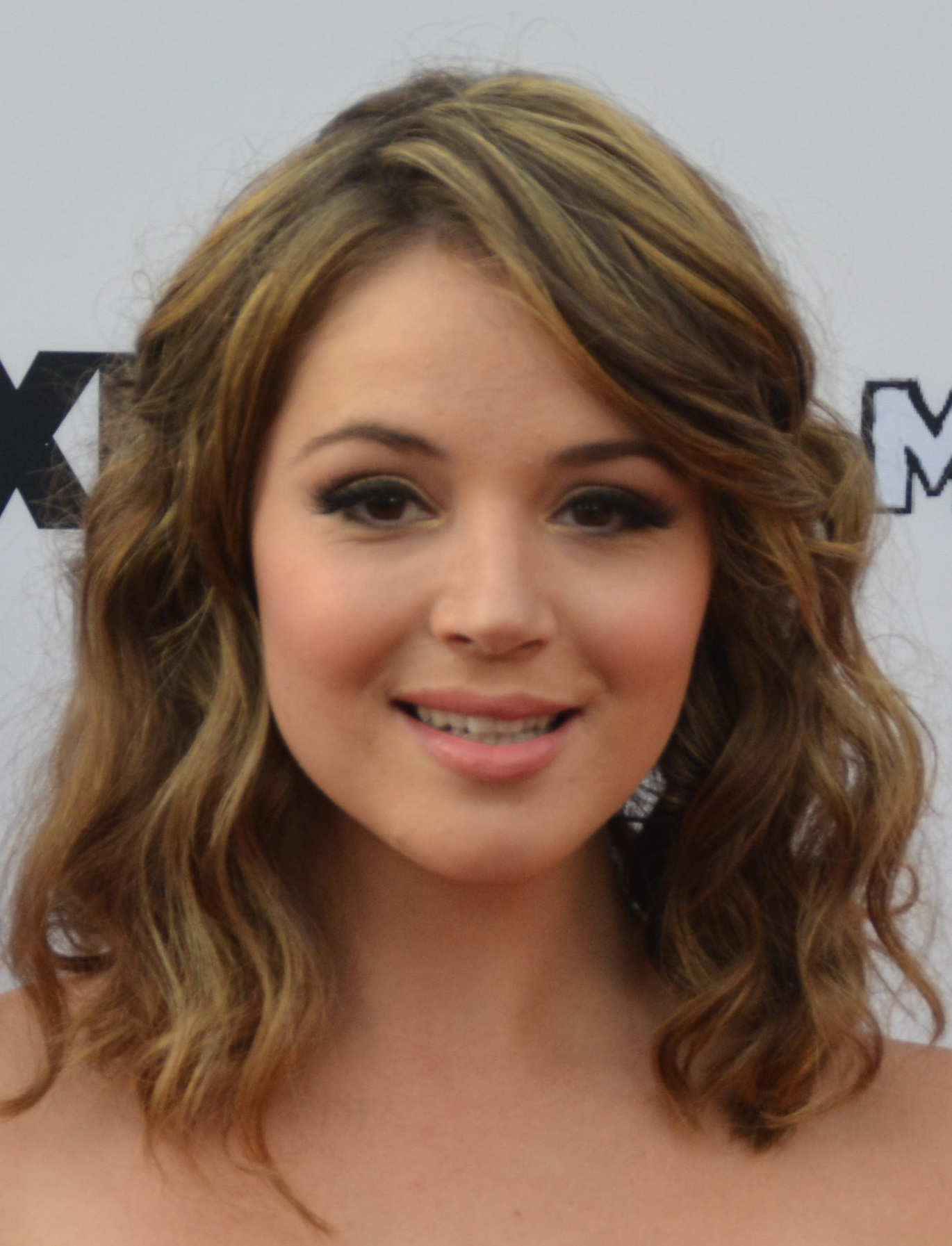
- Donohue at the series premieres of You're the Worst and Married in July 2014
- Other names: Kether Fernandez; Annice Moriarty
- Occupation: Actress
- Years active: 1997–present

Kether Donohue is an American actress and singer. She is known for her role as Lindsay on You're the Worst, as a cappella leader Alice in Pitch Perfect, and as the exocomp Peanut Hamper on Star Trek: Lower Decks.

== Early life ==
Donohue grew up on the Lower East Side of Manhattan, New York City, and went to a performing arts high school.

Donohue studied at the Anthony Meindl Acting Center. In 2008, she graduated from Fordham University where she was a communication and media studies major with a concentration in film.

== Career ==
Donohue is known for the voices of Lily on Kappa Mikey, Kiki Benjamin on Mew Mew Power and Zoe and Chomp on Dinosaur King. Donohue was also featured in the video for "Coder Girl" by Dale Chase.

In January 2016, Donohue appeared in the role of Jan in the Fox presentation of Grease Live.

She received a Critics' Choice Television Award nomination in December 2015 for Best Supporting Actress in a Comedy Series for her role in the FX/FXX series You're the Worst.

== Personal life ==
Donohue's first name came from an angel name book, and means "crown" in Hebrew. It does not reference angels, in spite of coming from a book of angel names.

== Filmography ==
=== Live-action ===
List of acting performances in film and television
| Year | Title | Role | Notes | Source |
|---|---|---|---|---|
| 2005 | Hope & Faith | Madison Melville | | |
| 2007 | Over the GW | Sofia Serra | | |
| 2008 | Late Night with Conan O'Brien | Pregnant Intern | | |
| 2009 | Aaron Bacon | Carrie Bacon | | |
| 2009 | New York Lately | Pam | | |
| 2009 | An Old Hope | Brenda Applegate | | |
| 2009 | Royal Pains | Ali | | |
| 2010 | Boy Wonder | Lizzy | | |
| 2012 | Altered States of Plaine | Violet | | |
| 2012 | The Bay | Donna Thompson | | |
| 2012 | The Mindy Project | Restaurant's Maitre D | | |
| 2012 | Pitch Perfect | Alice | graduate Barden Bella and the previous A Cappella group Leader | |
| 2012 | Ringer | Waitress | | |
| 2013 | High Maintenance | Annie | | |
| 2014–2019 | You're the Worst | Lindsay Jillian | main cast | |
| 2015 | Pitch Perfect 2 | Legacy Bella | cameo appearance | |
| 2016 | Collar | Debbie | | |
| 2016 | Grease Live | Jan | | |
| 2016 | Opening Night | Eileen | | |
| 2018 | Champions | Denise | | |
| 2018 | The Guest Book | Tara | | |
| 2018 | LA to Vegas | Meghan | | |
| 2019 | You | Tina | | |
| 2020 | B Positive | Gabby | | |
| 2020 | Royalties | Sara | | |

=== Voice roles ===
List of voice performances in film and television
| Year | Title | Role | Notes | Source |
|---|---|---|---|---|
| 1997 | The King of Braves GaoGaiGar | Reiko Komori | As Kether Donohue | |
| 1999 | Magical DoReMi | Mirabelle Haywood | As Kether Donohue | |
| 2002 | The Boy Who Wanted to Be a Bear | Young She-Bear | As Kether Fernandez | |
| 2002 | Mew Mew Power | Kiki Benjamin | | |
| 2002 | Piano: The Melody of a Young Girl's Heart | Shinohara | | |
| 2004 | Midori Days | Midori Kusagano | As Kether Fernandez | |
| 2004 | Munto 2 | Arine, Suzume Imamura | As Annice Moriarty | |
| 2005 | Negadon: The Monster from Mars | Emi Narisaki | As Annice Moriarty | |
| 2005–2006 | Ah! My Goddess | Skuld | As Annice Moriarty | |
| 2006 | Ellen's Acres | Ms. Flomens, Mrs. MacStinger, Mrs. Steele, Lydia Galentine | As Annice Moriarty | |
| 2006 | Yu-Gi-Oh! Capsule Monsters | Young pigtailed African-American girl | Episode: "Eye of the Storm" | |
| 2006–2008 | Kappa Mikey | Lily, Ethel | As Annice Moriarty | |
| 2007 | Dinosaur King | Zoe Drake, Chomp | As Annice Moriarty | |
| 2007 | Let's Go! Tamagotchi | Makiko | As Annice Moriarty | |
| 2008 | GoGoRiki | Rosariki, additional voices | | |
| 2008 | Joe vs. Joe | Yu | | |
| 2008–2009 | Three Delivery | Eunice | As Annice Moriarty | |
| 2009–2010 | Pokémon: Diamond and Pearl | Candice, additional voices | | |
| 2009 | Kurokami the Animation | Makana | | |
| 2009–2011 | Yu-Gi-Oh! 5D's | Angela Raines | | |
| 2010 | Hareport | Cookie, Crow Sister #1, additional voices | | |
| 2010 | Slayers Evolution-R | Yappi | | |
| 2016–2017 | All Hail King Julien | Brosalind, April | | |
| 2017 | Sunny Day | Sara | | |
| 2019 | American Dad! | Chloe, Trench Woman | | |
| 2019–2020 | Elena of Avalor | Flo | | |
| 2020–2023 | Star Trek: Lower Decks | Ensign Peanut Hamper | 3 episodes | |
| 2021–2022 | Birdgirl | Gillian | | |
| 2021–2022 | Tuca & Bertie | Additional voices | | |
| 2021 | Robot Chicken | Party Store Vendor | | |
| 2026 | Star Trek: Starfleet Academy | Almond Basket | Cameo, episode: "Beta Test" | |
| 2026 | Ray Gunn | Levity Love | | |
