= Gillian Vigman =

American actress and comedian

- Vigman at Dragon Con in 2026
- Occupations: Actress, comedian, screenwriter
- Years active: 1998–present

Gillian Vigman is an American actress, comedian, and screenwriter. She has played Jack Box's Wife in many Jack in the Box commercials, and was a recurring cast member of the sketch comedy series MADtv. Vigman also starred in the ABC comedy Sons & Daughters, and had recurring roles in the sitcoms Suburgatory and New Girl. Since 2020, she has voiced the character of Dr. T'Ana on the animated series Star Trek: Lower Decks.

== Early life ==
Vigman was born to a British mother and an American father. Her father was born to Jewish parents, whereas her mother converted to Judaism.

Vigman attended Colgate University, graduating in 1994.

== Career ==
She started her professional comedy career in Chicago working for The Second City. Prior to joining the cast of MADtv, Vigman toured with The Second City National Touring Company in 2000, to launch its 20th anniversary S season.

She first appeared on MADtv in the eighth episode of the eighth season in a sketch called "The Real Bachelor." She is only the second cast member to appear in an earlier season before joining the regular recurring cast. Only Daniele Gaither, who appeared in a sketch in season two before joining the cast in Season Nine, has obtained such a distinction.

Vigman officially joined the cast of MADtv in 2003, as a feature performer, for the ninth season. At the end of Season Nine, in 2004, her contract was not renewed.

She made appearances on several television shows like I Love the '90s, Scrubs, World Cup Comedy and Cupid before starring in the ABC comedy Sons & Daughters, playing the role of Liz Walker. After Sons & Daughters, Vigman appeared on a number of hit shows including According to Jim, Parks and Recreation, and New Girl, before landing the recurring part of Jill Werner on Suburgatory in 2011. Her film credits include The Hangover series, The 40-Year-Old Virgin, After the Sunset, Dragonfly, and Love 101.

She has appeared in various commercials, including for Hanes, Jack in the Box, Chase, Swiffer, Splenda, Esurance, 1-800 Contacts, DirecTV, United Airlines, Rooms to Go, Buick, Real California Milk, and Progressive Insurance.

== Filmography ==
=== Film ===
Year	Title	Role	Notes
2005	The 40-Year-Old Virgin	Woman at Speed Dating	
2005	Fancy	Julie	Short
2006	Deck the Halls	Gerta	
2008	Step Brothers	Pam Gringe	
2009	The Hangover	Stephanie Wenneck	
2009	Aliens in the Attic	Nina Pearson	
2011	The Hangover Part II	Stephanie Wenneck	
2011	Withstand One Night	Viv	Short
2011	Answers to Nothing	Jennifer	
2012	Mr. Universe	Suzanne	Short
2013	The Kings of Summer	Carol	
2013	The Hangover Part III	Stephanie Wenneck	
2014	Helicopter Mom	Barbara	
2016	The Press Conference	Gov. Moore	Short
2017	A Crooked Somebody	Monica Lewis	
2017	The House	Becky	
2017	Deadly Detention	Ms. Presley	
2018	Forever My Girl	Doris	
2023	The Holdovers	Judy Clotfelter	
2024	Snack Shack	Jean	

=== Television ===
Year	Title	Role	Notes
1998	Cupid	Daphne	"Botched Makeover"
2003–04	Mad TV	Various	Regular role (season 9)
2003	Scrubs	Patient	"My Drama Queen"
2004	Significant Others	Gillian	"An Ache, a Fake & Forgot to Brake"
2006	Comedy Central Thanksgiving Wiikend: Thanksgiving Island	Mrs. Bixby	TV film
2006–07	Sons & Daughters	Liz Walker	Main role
2007	According to Jim	Jillian	"The Flannelsexual"
2007	American Body Shop	Wendy	"Stretchy Face"
2009	Accidentally on Purpose	Toni	"Class"
2009	Parks and Recreation	Alexa	"Christmas Scandal"
2010	The Hard Life	Gina	TV film
2010–11	The Defenders	Jessica Morelli	Recurring role
2011	Funny or Die	Gail	Segment: "Baby Boss"
2011	United States of Tara	Abby	"Chicken 'n' Corn", "Bryce Will Play"
2011–13	Suburgatory	Jill Werner	Recurring role (seasons 1–2)
2011–18	New Girl	Kim	Recurring role (seasons 1, 3, 5–7)
2012	Californication	Mary	"Waiting for the Miracle"
2012	Little Brother	Katie	TV film
2013	Cougar Town	Mary	"You Tell Me"
2014	Transparent	Tammy Cashman	"Original Pilot"
2014	Legit	Regina Frost	"Death"
2014	Selfie	Carol-June	"Pilot"
2014	The Goldbergs	Louise Rubin	"Shall We Play a Game?"
2014	Newsreaders	Cheryl Hinnerman	"Motorboating Dads; the Negative $100,000 Question"
2014	CSI: Crime Scene Investigation	Dr. Jane Snyder	"Girls Gone Wilder"
2014	Supernatural	Heddy	"Ask Jeeves"
2015	Quality Time	Samantha	"Pilot"
2015	Take It From Us	Alyson	TV film
2015	Filthy Preppy Teens	Kyle	"The Return of the Prodigal Teens", "Hangout", "St. Patrick's Day"
2016	Angie Tribeca	Jean Naté	"The Wedding Planner Did It"
2016	Adventures in Babysitting	Helen Anderson	TV film
2016–17	Life in Pieces	Tabitha	"Bite Flight Wing-Man Bonnie", "Chef Rescue Negotiator Necklace"
2016–17	Dr. Ken	Megan	"Dr. K's New Girlfriend", "A Dr. Ken Valentine's Day", "Pat's Rash"
2016–18	Divorce	Janice	"Weekend Plans", "Another Party", "Happy Now?"
2017	Lopez	Lori Strahan	Recurring role (season 2)
2017	I'm Sorry	Melissa	"Pilot"
2017	Get Shorty	Nicole	"A Man of Letters"
2018	It's Always Sunny in Philadelphia	Karen	Episode: "The Gang Gets New Wheels"
2018	Life Sentence	Ida Abbott	Main role
2019	Rise of the Teenage Mutant Ninja Turtles	Boss Beverly, Ogre Henchmen	Voices; Episode: "You Got Served"
2020–24	Star Trek: Lower Decks	Dr. T'Ana	Voice; Main role
2021	Roswell, New Mexico	Brooke Taylor	Recurring role
2021–22	The Sex Lives of College Girls	Mimi Murray	Recurring role
2023	Goosebumps	Georgia Biddle	Episode: "Night of the Living Dummy"
