= List of Craig of the Creek characters =

The American animated sitcom Craig of the Creek features a cast created by Matt Burnett and Ben Levin. The series focuses on a trio of kids, collectively referred to as the "Stump Kids," led by Craig (voiced by Philip Solomon), a young boy who wants to explore and map the wide and mysterious creek located in the fictional suburban town of Herkleton, Maryland. His companions include Kelsey (voiced by Georgie Kidder in the pilot and the first 3 episodes and Noël Wells in episodes 4–180), a young "warrior" girl with an active imagination and a lust for adventure, and J.P. (voiced by H. Michael Croner), a goofy and kind-hearted boy who likes to take things easy. In season four, they are joined by Omar (voiced by Zeno Robinson) a quiet, but very adventurous boy. The four of them attend different schools with the Creek being the only thing that brings them together.

== Main ==
=== Craig Williams ===
Craig Williams
- Craig of the Creek character
- First appearance: "Craig of the Creek" (2017)
- Created by: Matt Burnett; Ben Levin
- Voiced by: Philip Solomon
- Age: 10

In-universe information
- Full name: Craigford Williams
- Alias: Jacob (Note: As seen in "Jacob of the Creek".)
- Nicknames: Map Boy; Craig of the Creek; Craiggy Boy peanut head
- Species: Human
- Gender: Male
- Occupation: Cartographer
- Affiliation: Stump Kids; Ice Pop Trio; Council of the Creek; Junior Forest Scouts (formerly; alternate dimension)
- Family: Duane Williams (father); Nicole Williams (mother); Bernard Williams (older brother); Jessica Williams (younger sister)
- Significant other: Wildernessa (girlfriend)
- Relatives: Earl Williams (grandfather); Jojo Williams (grandmother); Darnell Williams (uncle); Kim Williams (aunt); Bryson Williams (cousin); Jasmine Williams (cousin)

Craigford ( Craig ) Williams is a 10-year-old African-American boy who enjoys playing at the creek with his friends Kelsey and J.P. He is a natural leader and always tries to help kids in need. Craig is never without his turquoise bag filled with "important" items, and carries a staff, made from a stair banister pole that he once got his head stuck in. Craig seems to know his way around the creek and worships its importance to the kids in Herkleton. He sets his sights on wanting to explore the creek for his own amusement and chart out everything. Because of this, he takes on the role of a cartographer at the creek as he usually draws maps and is asked by others to map or plot things for them. In "Escape from Family Dinner," it is implied that Craig is smart to some degree as he takes advanced math and admits that he likes the class. He also seems capable of knowing the answers to a math question just by looking at it for a few seconds. He also displays a great deal of building and construction which he inherited from his grandfather as seen in "Brother Builder." His favorite franchise is Slide the Ferret, a pastiche of Sonic the Hedgehog.

Craig can become power hungry or obsessive as seen in "Ace of Squares" and "Bug City." The reason for this might lead back to his relationship with Bernard. However, by the end of both episodes, he overcomes these urges. He is also convinced of supernatural or above average forces such as in "Doorway to Helen" (thinking that Helen was communicating to him from another dimension) and "The Last Kid in the Creek" (believing that he wished he was the only kid in the Creek), despite clear evidence to the more obvious and practical reasoning (Helen has a different schedule from Craig and all the other kids caught a virus from Kit). He can sometimes be pretty closed-minded as well, as he tends to ignore other people's advice in favor of his own, though he eventually sees reason. He is also self-conscious about the shape of his head; becoming embarrassed when commented on its odd appearance, but amused when given an endearing compliment such as when Sparkle Cadet said it was "cute."

Craig maintains a great relationship with his family except for Bernard whom he has a love-hate relationship. As seen in "Bring Out Your Beast" however, deep down it is implied that he simply wants to connect with him as his brother had a tendency to push him away when he was younger. The closest relationship he has is with his grandfather, Earl, who seems to have an adventurous spirit similar to Craig. Craig also cares for his two friends Kelsey and J.P. who in return look to him for guidance. He, along with his friends, all seem to be well known at the Creek, most likely for their various heroic endeavors. Craig has been viewed as something of an adviser and aide to the various factions of the Creek and has managed to enter the good graces of many, such as the Sewer Queen. His ability to be diplomatic has allowed him to form the Creek Council, a council consisting of him, Kelsey, J.P. and the leaders of the various factions of the creek.

Craig can be stubborn when it comes to maintaining some semblance of his childhood. In "The Evolution of Craig", he worried that he would turn into someone like Bernard and grow up into someone boring. In "Cousin of the Creek", he was slightly miffed when his cousin seemed to lack the enthusiasm they once shared when they were younger, though by the end they managed to find common ground. He ultimately wants to maintain his carefree nature throughout his life but learns that it is also important to show some maturity. He takes his role in the Creek very seriously to the point that he has managed to garner some self-importance. In "Tea Timer's Ball", he humorously believed that Eliza was trying to get back at him for humiliating her in the past, when in actuality she was trying to get back at Sailor Boy for not being invited to his yacht. He later took comfort in the fact that he had numerous other rivals and enemies at the Creek.

Craig has had annoying interactions with Wildernessa due to her dismissive attitude towards him. In truth, she actually has a crush on him. In "Breaking the Ice", he calls her out on her actions, which leads to her apologizing and expressing her emotions (in the form of a bird mating call). After helping to rescue her dog, Cheesesticks, in "Puppy Love", they reveal their mutual feelings for each other and Craig starts calling her by her real name Vanessa.

In "Alternate Creekiverse", Craig is shown to be a dutiful forest scout who is still obsessed with exploring and takes his job as a protector much more seriously. In "Craig to the Future", Craig is a commission artist who works with Kit and is in a relationship with Vanessa, though he has lost touch with the other Stump Kids.

=== Kelsey Pokoly ===
Kelsey Pokoly
- First appearance: "Craig of the Creek" (2017)
- Created by: Matt Burnett; Ben Levin
- Voiced by: Georgie Kidder (Note: pilot and the first 3 episodes.); Noël Wells
- Age: 9

In-universe information
- Species: Human
- Gender: Female
- Affiliation: Stump Kids; Ninja Kids (formerly; alternate dimension)
- Family: Neil Pokoly (father); Mortimor (pet)
- Significant other: Stacks (girlfriend)

Kelsey Pokoly is a 9-year-old girl with red hair who is one of Craig's friends. She is always seen wearing a cape. She has a pet parakeet, which she identifies as a falcon, named Mortimor who is usually perched on top of her head. Kelsey is adventurous and tends to be overly dramatic. She has internal narrations that the others are seemingly aware of. She is raised by her single widower father. Though she apparently won't admit it, Kelsey seems to slightly suffer from loneliness due to always being home alone without any parents to watch her for a long time. In "Body Swap", she openly expresses interest in having siblings to her father. In "The Invitation" Kelsey is revealed to be Hungarian after presenting a dish of Chicken paprikash. In "Doorway to Helen", it is revealed that Kelsey is Jewish. It is implied that her obsession with fantasy came from her mother, who died some time ago, and has been inspired to write her book called Robyn and the Snow Sword. In "The Other Side: The Tournament", she is revealed to be a fan of the show Steven Universe.

Kelsey is under the belief that she is the lead hero in her own story and that one day her adventures will be written down. She carries a sword made from PVC pipe that was "bestowed" on her by a warehouse worker ironically named Piper. Despite it being a harmless blunt toy, it is shown to be very effective in combat, though it gets destroyed in "The Other Side" and rebuilt by "Camper on the Run". She wears a bluish-purple cape that she is seldom seen without and may have possibly come from her mother. Aside from that, Kelsey has a short temper and can be very feisty and curt in situations. From time to time, she has to be held back by Craig and J.P. whenever she begins to act out. In "Kelsey Quest", it is shown that whenever she is intimidated or put down, she can become self-degrading and her internal monologues begin to stall. Because of this, she needs the comfort and support of her friends.

Kelsey loves her father, who is the only person besides Mortimor who she has to rely on. In return, her father supports her fantasies. Kelsey is very close to Craig and J.P. She views the former as her equal in terms of adventuring and the latter as a simple, naive sidekick of sorts. She nevertheless cares for them dearly. Besides them, she appears to be close friends with Maney of the Horse Girls, who acts as her steed in "battle", Stacks, who provides interesting talks over various books of fantasy and sci-fi origin and has shown strong admiration towards Wildernessa and her animal conservationist efforts. In "Tea Timer's Ball", she learns that a boy named Aaron has a crush on her. Despite accepting his offer to attend a dance, she admits that she does not have any romantic feelings for him. She was later revealed via Twitter by show writer Jeff Trammell, to be a lesbian as well In the episode "Wildernessa" it is shown that Kelsey had a crush on Wildernessa. This culminated in the episode "Fire and Ice" where she realizes that she has feelings for Stacks and, following a supportive conversation with Kat, chooses to pursue a relationship with her. In "Heart of the Forest", Xavier points out he wasn’t going to betray them but since they except Craig believed he was they motivated/wanted him to do it, Craig agrees what they did was disgraceful much to Kelsey's reaction.

In "Alternate Creekiverse", Kelsey is a member of the ninja kids, but is not as well adapted as them. She also has a mouse instead of a parakeet. In "Craig to the Future", Kelsey is close friends with Maya and they both take part in wrestling. She initially had broken up with Stacks for a week, but gets back together with her.

=== John Paul (J.P.) Mercer ===
John Paul (J.P.) Mercer
- First appearance: "Craig of the Creek" (2017)
- Created by: Matt Burnett; Ben Levin
- Voiced by: H. Michael Croner
- Age: 11; 12 (Adventures in Baby Casino)

In-universe information
- Full name: John Paul Mercer
- Nickname: J.P.
- Species: Human
- Gender: Male
- Affiliation: Stump Kids
- Family: Paula Mercer (mother); John Mercer (father); Laura Mercer (sister); Goo (pet)
- Significant other: Maney (girlfriend)
- Relatives: Amanda Mercer (possible step-mother)

John Paul (J.P.) Mercer is a tall, 11-year-old boy with a Southern accent who is one of Craig's friends. He wears a hockey jersey that is clearly too big for him. He is shown to be a weirdo, but is very helpful and kind to those around him. In "Under the Overpass", Craig stated that he and Kelsey "found" J.P. through their constant exploration, but in Craig Before the Creek, it is revealed that they met him among pirates. He maintains an open minded attitude about things and hardly shows any prejudice whatsoever. These traits most likely come from his sister Laura who taught him that "all bodies are beautiful". He is also more likely to get dirty than either Craig or Kelsey which does not seem to bother him, but does occasionally irritate others. According to his mother, J.P. cannot stand directly in the sun for more than twenty seconds, otherwise "he'll combust".

Due to having a simple mind set, J.P. is at times shown to be incapable of taking care of himself and sometimes needs to rely on his friends for support. On the other hand, he gets along well with younger kids. As J.P. is older than his friends, he does wish to be more responsible as seen in "Sunday Clothes". He has a much more practical mindset and occasionally shows more discipline as he once berated Craig for getting angry and will at least attempt to take initiative whenever he or Kelsey are not up to the task. He is also willing to put them above anything else and considers them his lifelong companions.

He has a mutual attraction to Maney of the Horse Girls. What started as admiration has since evolved into genuine romantic feelings, as the two of them act shy when they are around one another and the two of them become a couple in "The Tea Timers Ball". J.P. surprisingly gets along well with Boris of the Junior Forest Scouts, despite everyone else disliking that group. He also has surprising intuition. During the events of "Alone Quest", J.P. was able to guess exactly what Kelsey was doing throughout the day with pinpoint accuracy, scaring Kelsey and Craig, whilst in "Sour Candy Trials" while Craig has a mental vision of his 'spirit family', J.P. claims that he can see them too. In "The Evolution of Craig", J.P. reveals that he wants to be just like his sister because of how well adjusted she is since graduating high school. He also deeply loves his mother Paula, but is only able to see her late at night when she comes home from flying. In "Heart of the Forest", Xavier points out he wasn’t going to betray them but since they except Craig believed he was they motivated/wanted him to do it, Craig agrees what they did was disgraceful much to J.P.'s reaction.

In "Alternate Creekiverse", J.P. is a member of the Paintball Kids, but is too peaceful compared to them. In "Craig to the Future", J.P. is the manager of the smoothie shop with Elder Dave still an employee there. He is still close friends with Omar and Bobby.

=== Omar ===
Omar
- First appearance: "Under the Overpass" (2018)
- Created by: Matt Burnett; Ben Levin
- Voiced by: Zeno Robinson
- Age: 12

In-universe information
- Nickname: The Green Poncho
- Species: Human
- Gender: Male
- Affiliation: Stump Kids
- Family: Unnamed sister Unnamed brother-in-law Unnamed stepbrother

Omar, formerly The Green Poncho and credited as Poncho in his first appearance, is a 12-year-old boy who comes from the other side of the Creek. In his first appearance, he came off as enigmatic and hardly spoke, but grabbed Craig's attention. The Stump Kids did not know what to make of him, only that he was insistent that they never come back. However, Craig soon learned that the mysterious Green Poncho was, in fact, an ally and trying to protect them from the totalitarian regime from his side. Since then, he has been on various adventures with the Stump Kids, usually as a way to get back at King Xavier, the leader of the other side. In "Into the Overpast", he was shown to be close friends with Maya, Xavier's right hand. They met young Xavier and became close friends with him. When Xavier ascended the throne, he had Omar and Maya fight for the role of his best friend. He took the title of the Green Poncho from the previous holder Michelle Green.

Omar speaks with a monotone voice and keeps a very deadpan expression. He was once a very energetic boy and very fun-loving, but the trauma of Maya leaving him for Xavier made him the way he is. He takes his job very seriously at the Creek and will get rough whenever someone challenges him. He does have a calmer side and lowered his defenses when he met Craig and his friends. Craig seems to look up to him. Whether he realizes this or not is unknown. Ironically, the only person who seems capable of putting a smile on his face is J.P. whose jokes are enough to make him laugh really hard.

He officially joins the Stump Kids in "Beyond the Overpass", though he is mostly relegated to adventures that involve collecting pieces of the cube. In "Chrono Moss", he revealed to be nostalgic for his life as the Green Poncho, as it reminds him of his love of JRPGs, and does not know what to do with himself, though Craig helps him through. In "Dodgy Decisions", he reunites with Maya and, after a very awkward reunion, apparently mends his friendship with her. In "Who Is the Red Poncho?", he defends Maya after the Stump Kids believe that Maya is the Red Poncho, but when he sees Maya with a cube, he makes a terrible mistake of accusing her, after the Red Poncho appears and Maya scolds Omar for actually believing she is still a villain. In "Heart of the Forest", Xavier points out he wasn’t going to betray them but since they except Craig believed he was they motivated/wanted him to do it, Craig agrees what they did was disgraceful much to Omar's reaction, Xavier tells him he was going to change but Omar couldn't let go his grudge then Maya tells Omar (after accusing her of working against him) to stop and let it go already as Xavier gets it he messed up and that Omar, Maya and Xavier together made mistakes, after Xavier saves them by staying back Omar and Xavier makes peace and slowly progress.

In "Craig to the Future", Omar works at a comic book store, but is bored of the job. He is still friends with J.P. and acquainted with Bobby.

== The Williams family ==
Earl	Jojo
Darnell	Kim	Duane	Nicole
Jasmine	Bryson	Bernard	Craig	Jessica

- Bernard Williams (voiced by Phil LaMarr) is Craig's smarter, yet cynical, snobby, and condescending 16-year-old brother who looks down on Craig and his adventures at the creek. He is obsessed with getting good grades and getting into an Ivy League college. Despite his studious nature, Bernard has shown to have had a fun and geeky side in the past. He used to play Bring Out Your Beast and showed interest in teaching it to Craig as seen in the episode of the same name, but broke his promise as he thought it was too childish. He also seems familiar with the game Power Punchers and taught it to Jessica in "Jessica Shorts". The episode "Craig and the Kid's Table" reveals that he indeed used to enjoy being with his younger siblings, but while growing up chose to act more mature, or at least what he perceives as mature. He has a girlfriend named Alexis whom he is so devoted to that they have an overly complicated plan for their future. During the summer, he and Alexis work at Pasta La Vista, an Italian restaurant. In season four, Bernard starts looking for colleges with his parents wanting him to attend Howard University. In "Alternate Creekiverse", Bernard is very affectionate towards Craig and gives him hugs. In “Craig of the Campus”, Bernard’s arrogant and stuck-up belief in his own “maturity” and readiness to be a grown-up is shattered when a visit to Howard University goes south, and after initially getting sucked into Mark’s way of life out at the Creek out of a fear of facing adulthood, he is saved by Alexis and the two agree to “take a break” from their lists and plans and just enjoy being like teenagers their own age while they still can and get back together.
- Jessica Williams (voiced by Dharma Brown in the pilot and Lucia Cunningham in the TV series) is Craig's younger sister who is rather precocious. She is very smart for her age and already shows an interest in the stock market. Unlike Bernard, she has shown support for Craig in certain situations, affectionately calling him "Craigy", and occasionally visits the Creek. She will even show Craig a thing or two about how to handle certain situations. She is sometimes unofficially seen as the fourth (fifth if Mortimor is counted) member of the Stump Kids. She has a close connection to her doll Small Uncle. She admires Kit due to her business acumen and is shown to be very physically capable of taking on older kids. In "Craig to the Future", Jessica has started her own business despite still being a teenager.
- Duane Williams (voiced by Terry Crews in Craig of the Creek, Byron Marc Newsome in Jessica's Big Little World and Craig Before the Creek) is Craig's understanding father who works as a computer programmer. He sometimes plays retro video games with Craig and loves bad jokes. Duane can be competitive at times, but loves his wife and children unconditionally.
- Nicole Williams (voiced by Kimberly Hébert Gregory) is Craig's loving mother who works as a school counselor and cares deeply for her children. She always offers reassuring advice to Craig whenever he needs it.
- Earl Williams (voiced by Phil LaMarr in the pilot, Phil Morris in the series) is Craig's grandfather whom he looks up to and inherited his adventurous spirit from. He is very optimistic and youthful in spirit, but can sometimes be too talkative.
- Jojo Williams (voiced by Saundra McClain) is Craig's grandmother who is part of the city council and was a civil rights activist back in the 1960s. Her sweater has sayings on it that change in between shots to suit the scene.
- Bryson Williams (voiced by Terrence Hardy Jr.) is Craig's cousin and Darnell and Kim's son who used to play superheroes with him. Craig considers him cool due to his looks and the way he dresses. Despite all this, he is very down to earth compared to the other kids. He is not used to the eccentric and dynamic tastes of the Creek Kids, but does not seem to mind.
- Darnell Aloysius Williams (voiced by Lil Rel Howery) is Craig's uncle and Duane's younger brother who, while friendly, tends to talk down to him and boasts his own talents.
- Kim Williams (voiced by Tisha Campbell) is Craig's aunt and Darnell's wife and Nicole's friend who loves carrying conversations with her.
- Jasmine Williams (voiced by Tawny Newsome) is Craig's cousin and Darnell and Kim's laid-back daughter who is in college. She is a lesbian.

== Other teenagers and adults ==
- Alexis (voiced by Karen Fukuhara) is Bernard's kindhearted girlfriend who, unlike him, finds Craig amusing. She is also shown to be impressed with her boyfriend's many hidden talents, even if she is unsure what any of them entail. They are so devoted to each other to the point that they have an overly complicated plan for their future. During the summer, she and Bernard work at Pasta La Vista, an Italian restaurant.
- Neil Pokoly (voiced by Ian Roberts) is Kelsey's widower father who is stern, but caring. He seems very liberal however, as he lets her wear her cape in their family photo. Neil can be rather intimidating, but he is shown to at least adhere to Kelsey's personality. He does have his limits and will discipline her when necessary. He seems to lack certain social skills as he tends to be literal and fails to realize that much of his planning is an annoyance to some. He still wears his wedding band and in "Body Swap" seems reluctant to remarry and have another child.
- Paula Mercer (voiced by Kari Wahlgren) is J.P.'s mother who works as an airline pilot. He rarely gets to see her due to her constant traveling. She is divorced from her husband John, who lives in Canada with his new wife Amanda.
- Laura Mercer (voiced by Fortune Feimster) is J.P.'s openly lesbian older sister who is a nurse and also cares for the family, acting as a parental figure to J.P. while their mother is away. She has also been shown to be a body-positive person, referring to J.P.'s body as "beautiful" on more than one occasion. In "Jextra Perrestrial" she is shown to be in a same-sex relationship with a girl named Kat.
- Kat (voiced by Charlet Chung) is Laura's girlfriend who is cool and laid back. She finds J.P. and his friends amusing. She is apparently a writer.
- Evelyn (voiced by Vernee Watson-Johnson) is Kit's grandmother who lives in a nursing home. She displays similar trading skills to her granddaughter and deduces that she has a crush on Craig.
- Harold (voiced by Matt Burnett) is the lethargic librarian who takes his job very seriously. He always seems to be at odds with the kids. He also cannot read while standing.
- Cariss (voiced by Tiffany Ford) is one of Bernard and Alexis' friends. She has reddish skin, most likely tanned, and always seems disinterested in what is happening around her, many times in a rude way.
- Gibson (voiced by Jeff Trammell) is one of Bernard and Alexis' friends. He has messy hair and is very blunt about his opinions and laid back. He seems to be fond of Kelsey whom he calls a "little warrior girl".
- Amina (voiced by Kausar Mohammed) is one of Bernard and Alexis' friends. She is a Muslim girl who is energetic and fun-loving. She seems to enjoy being around J.P. due to their similar personalities. She also had Spanish class with David of the Elders.
- Bad Moves (voiced by themselves) are a rock group that lives in Herkelston. Its members consist of David Combs, Emma Cleveland, Katie Park and Daoud Tyler-Ameen. Due to the fact that their music annoys the neighbors, they are offered a place at the Creek called the Vulture's Nest to perform. They are mentioned in "Craig to the Future", where they apparently hired Craig and Kit as their official artists.
- Lorraine Murillo (voiced by Carla Tassara) is the substitute librarian who fills in for Harold. She takes her job very seriously. The kids thought she was La Llorona, but she is proven to be very nice, though she did take a ghastly appearance to warn the kids of future destruction of the library.
- Rory (voiced by Deedee Magno Hall) is Eileen's mother who signed her up for swimming classes. Upon learning that she has been ditching them, she tells her that she did not need to lie to her and forgives her.
- Cristal (voiced by Minerva Vier) is Eileen's older sister and an avid gamer.
- Lola (voiced by Minerva Vier) is Eileen's grandmother who only speaks Bisaya, though she occasionally throws some English in.
- Ravi (voiced by Danny Pudi) is Raj's father who is an excellent cook and is apparently very handsome. He is also a widower as his wife died sometime prior.
- Nila Ba (voiced by Sonal Shah) is Raj's grandmother who was an adventurous in her youth in India. She was the first of her friends to do donuts in a vehicle. She mostly speaks in Gujarati, but can say "number one" in English when referring to her accomplishments.
- Melody (voiced by Jessica DiCicco) is Elder Barry's girlfriend debuting in "The Elders of the Creek".

== Creek Kids ==
=== The Elders of the Creek ===
The Elders of the Creek are a trio of teenagers that claim to have been at the Creek the longest, though in "The End Was Here" they admit that their knowledge only goes as far back as the early '90s. In exchange for tribute, they give wisdom to those who seek it. The characters originated from Burnett and Levin's online series Ronin Dojo Community College DX.

- Mark (voiced by Ben Levin) is one of the Elders of the Creek, a teenage boy who is tall and slim with brown hair, and wears glasses. He and the elders often provide wisdom to Craig and his friends. Mark can occasionally be obnoxious due to his knowledge, but he has shown to be very helpful, but later becomes very controlling and mean. He enjoys anime and has a lot of anime merchandise. In "In Search of Lore", he is revealed to have been close with Kenneth, but upon seeing that he no longer wears their group necklace immediately breaks his friendship with him, causing Barry and David to leave him. After losing his friends, he became very selfish and refuses to admit that he was a bad friend and that he was the reason their friendships stopped.
- Barry (voiced by Matt Burnett) is one of the Elders of the Creek, a teenage boy who is rather portly and has light brown hair. He has a tendency to be pushed around by Mark, but is pretty laid back and loves talking about older Cartoon Network shows. He leaves the group in "In Search of Lore" because of Mark refusing to admit that he is a bad and selfish friend. In "The Elders of the Creek", he acquires a girlfriend who shares his interests named Melody.
- David (voiced by Zachary Steel) is one of the Elders of the Creek, a teenage boy who is short and has a vellus mustache. He is most wimpy of the elders and does not seem all that bright. On the other hand, he appears to be rather handsome without his helmet. He leaves the group in "In Search of Lore"; claiming that he is going to do something productive. In "Craig to the Future", David really left the Creek, he is goth now, and works at the Smoothie Groovy with Tabitha and Courtney.

=== Junior Forest Scouts ===
The Junior Forest Scouts are a trio of kids who use their status as scouts in an attempt to domineer the other kids of the Creek.

- Jason (voiced by Gunnar Sizemore) is a self-important Junior Forest Scout who speaks with a lisp due to his braces, but gets better as the show progresses. He is arrogant, rude, entitled, and annoying. He constantly uses his membership in the Junior Forest Scouts as justification for bossing people around. Craig and Jason consider themselves rivals. Since the events of "The Great Fossil Rush", Jason has become slightly less irritating to the other creek kids and has even joined the Creek Council to represent his group. In "The End Was Here", he reveals that he is lonely and that he genuinely wants to accept Craig's friendship, which he does. In "Alternate Creekiverse", Jason is not a forest scout and is a loner-bad boy type. In "Scoutguest", he reveals he has a stepmother and is implied that she and his father are neglectful to him.
- Tony (voiced by Ben Levin) is a self-important Junior Forest Scout who wears glasses and has the role as the secretary of the rules. He carries a big book with him all the time and constantly pulls facts from it.
- Boris (voiced by Matt Burnett) is a Junior Forest Scout part of Jason's troupe, who is tall and gets angry easily. Despite this, he has shown a softer side and seems to get along with J.P. easily.

=== Horse Girls ===
The Horse Girls are a group of girls who reside in the Creek's meadow. They emulate typical equine behavior and practice dressage. All of their names begin with M. In "Alternate Creekiverse", the Horse Girls are into playing basketball with Marie being much more welcoming to them.

- Mackenzie (voiced by Lauren Lapkus) is the leader of the Horse Girls. She is bossy and claims to be the most fashionable when it comes to horse accessories. Despite her snooty attitude, she genuinely cares for the other Horse Girls and just wants them to enjoy their horse-like activities.
- Melissa (voiced by Erin Whitehead) is a member of the Horse Girls. She is the most excited about horses right down to having supposedly eaten grass.
- Mangerine "Maney" (voiced by Mary Holland) is a member of the Horse Girls. She is the tallest and looks more like a horse compared to the rest and is close friends with Kelsey, acting as her steed. She has a crush on J.P., and vice versa. In "The Tea Timers Ball", they officially become a couple.
- Marie (voiced by Stephanie Allynne) is a member of the Horse Girls. She is the least excited about horses to the point she finds her friend's fascination with them confusing. In "Secret in a Bottle", it is revealed that she does not actually like horses and is deeply grateful to the Secret Kid for not revealing it, implying that she still wants to maintain her friendship with the other Horse Girls. She appears more interested in sports. In Craig Before the Creek, it is revealed that she was indeed committed to horses in the past, but most likely fell out of favor with it at some point.

=== 10 Speeds ===
The 10 Speeds are a mountain-bike loving group of kids and hang out at the bike park. In "Alternate Creekiverse", the 10 Speeds ride skateboards.

- Handlebarb (voiced by Jessica McKenna) is the tomboy leader of the 10 Speeds. She praises her bike's capabilities and talks like a typical 1990s sports commercial. In "Crisis at Elder Rock", it is revealed that she does not want her parents to find out that she does dangerous stunts. As of "Tea Timer's Ball", it is hinted that she and Warpspeed have feelings for each other.
- Cannonball (voiced by Jeff Trammell) is a member of the 10 Speeds. He is a short stocky boy who has never lost a race until "Creek Cart Racers" where he declares that "the curse has been lifted". Despite not being the leader, he represents his group in the Creek Council. In "Ice Pop Trio", he claims that he was named after his grandmother. Furthermore, his father is always giving him good advice. He has the ability to travel through "Cannonspace" which is a speed force that he can access depending on how fast he is riding. He can bring others with him. In "Craig to the Future", Cannonball takes up riding a motorcycle.
- Warpspeed (voiced by Philip Solomon) is a member of the 10 Speeds. A tall kid with purple-tinted glasses. He likes to record himself and his friends' bike moves. He is the only one who does not wear a helmet.
- Todd (voiced by H. Michael Croner) is a member of the 10 Speeds. He is the smallest and youngest member. He performs smaller moves which he thinks are great. He is allergic to a lot of things and thus is only able to eat granola bars.

=== Tea Timers ===
The Tea Timers are a group of rich kids who dedicate themselves to tea time.

- Eliza (voiced by Andrée Vermeulen) is the leader of the Tea Timers. A posh girl dressed in pink who looks down on others and loves to declare her wealth and status, and loves to cause drama and tension between friends and watch them argue and fight for her own amusement. She tends to hide back handed compliments when speaking to others. She represents her group in the Creek Council. It is revealed in the episode "Secret in a Bottle" that her secret is that she wears a wig, and in "Craig Before The Creek", it is shown that she is actually a brunette. She considers herself a villain as her group were the only kids to not join the rest of the Creek in their fight against King Xavier. She later blackmails the Secret Keeper in to stealing the other creek kids favorite belongings in order for her to give them back to them to become more loved. It is implied and shown that she and Toman are dating.
- Jane (voiced by Noël Wells) is a member of the Tea Timers. A girl dressed in violet and is close friends with Eliza.
- George (voiced by H. Michael Croner) is a member of the Tea Timers. A boy dressed in blue who is friends with Eliza, but is usually treated like a servant by her.

=== Witches of the Creek ===
The Witches of the Creek are two goth teens that come to the Creek at night and are often considered witches due to their gothic attire. They have feelings for each other which is confirmed in "The Haunted Dollhouse". Despite obviously using the Stump Kids' naivety to get things for them, their "magic" actually ends up fulfilling what the kids need, surprising and also scaring them. By "Craig to the Future", they seem to have slightly taken their job as witches seriously, though they are still bemused by it, and predict that in the future they become a musical duo. They have also loosely accepted David into their group, though mainly so he can do the things they do not want to do. Both their voice actresses work together for the Exactly Right Podcast Network.

- Tabitha (voiced by Karen Kilgariff) is one of the Witches of the Creek. A mischievous and macabre goth teen with sharp teeth who teases, but also likes Craig and his friends. She can be cynical and sometimes mean spirited, but cares for Courtney and enjoys her time with her as long as they can mess with Craig.
- Courtney (voiced by Georgia Hardstark) is one of the Witches of the Creek. A sensible and empathetic goth teen who teases, but also likes Craig and his friends. She tends to be more easy going and is the more accepting of her title as a "witch". She seems to genuinely want to help Craig, mostly because she thinks it is fun.

=== The Ninja Kids ===
The Ninja Kids are a group of kids obsessed with Japanese culture that reside at the waterfall in The Creek.

- Yustice (voiced by Charlet Chung) is the leader of The Ninja Kids. They are obsessed with Japanese culture, meaning things like manga, anime, and have been seen wielding bo-staffs and cardboard shurikens. She stays on some rocks in the waterfall. She secretly reads American comic books. She represents her group in the Creek Council.
- Zatch (voiced by Philip Solomon) is a member of The Ninja Kids, he is the most enthusiastic about Japanese culture.
- Prinda (voiced by Dana Davis) is a member of The Ninja Kids, she keeps ninja things in her pocket.

=== The Sewer Kids ===
The Sewer Kids are a group of kids who reside in the sewers near the Creek. They wear dirty clothes with swim gear.

- Eileen "Sewer Queen" (voiced by Karen Fukuhara) is a Filipino-American girl who, as her name implies, is the leader of Sewer Kids and is close friends with Craig and his friends. She mostly wears a shirt and boardshorts and is always barefoot. The Sewer Queen has webbed toes where her second and third toes on her right foot are. Along with other kids who were self-conscious about going to the local pool, she found sanctuary at the similarly water park-like sewer system of Herkleston. In "Crisis at Elder Rock", it is revealed that she does not want her parents to find out that she plays in the sewers. In "Sink or Swim Team" however, she admits it to her apparently single mother, who's okay with it. She represents her group in the Creek Council.
- Aquatina -
- Frisboy (voiced by Ben Levin) is a short and stout boy with almost no hair who wears goggles, and is very judgmental and sometimes mean to other kids who aren't sewer kids.
- Scuba (voiced by Karen Fukuhara) is a girl who, as her name implies, wears a scuba tube and goggles.
- Speedicious -
- Tiny Trunks -

=== The Alliance of Science ===
The Alliance of Science are a trio of nerdy kids who conduct scientific experiments in the Creek, usually with Craig and his friends in attendance.

- Wren Fletcher (voiced by Ashleigh Crystal Hairston) is a short nerdy girl adorned in a big suit and glasses. She mostly conducts experiments involving "quantum mechanics" and speaks with intensity and excitement about her scientific reasoning. She represents her group in the Creek Council. Her parents are divorced.
- Faraday (voiced by Zehra Fazal) is Wren's second in command who keeps track of their experiments. She is much more down to earth and is an expert in biology and chemistry.
- Carl (voiced by Phil LaMarr) – Usually the lab rat of the group who also has his fair share of scientific knowledge.

=== Cardboard City ===
Cardboard City is its own self-contained city made of cardboard that exists somewhere deep in the Creek. Its inhabitants consist solely of children who dress in and play with cardboard.

- Zoe "Zo-Zo" (voiced by Brianna Bryan) is a girl who is the lead guardsman of Cardboard City, who in "The Future is Cardboard" was once friends with Carter Brown. In "The Cardboard Identity", it is revealed that she befriended Carter after he sheltered her from the rain, but their friendship became strained when they invited more cardboard denizens.
- Carter Brown (voiced by Zeno Robinson) is a boy who has an obsession with cardboard and creates a fort that transforms into a giant robot. After being defeated, he retreated and decided to turn himself into a "card-borg" in an attempt to better himself. He fights against his "programming" and is forced to have his memories erased. He returns in "Copycat Carter" where he reboots and ends up mimicking Craig. He has his past memories restored and, after saving Jessica, finally returns to normal and gets re-accepted by the denizens of Carboard City.

=== The Trading Tree ===
The Trading Tree is the main market gathering area for all children to trade items for snacks or toys.

- Kitherine "Kit" (voiced by Dana Davis) is an African-American girl who runs the Trading Tree at the creek, trading food for other items, and shows strong entrepreneurial ambitions. She enjoys trading and refuses to give anything away for free. She accepts everything as currency except for rocks and Bitcoin. Her trading skills are grand to the point that she traded her father's car at one point for red velvet chocorolls. In "Crisis at Elder Rock", it is revealed that she does not want her parents to find out that she has been selling items without a license at the Creek. In "The Shortcut", it is implied that she might have a crush on Craig. However, she claims that her only "love interest" is commerce and avoided answering Aaron when he asked her out. Kit gets her supply from her grandmother based on how well she does in school. She claims that she is a straight A student and will sometimes do extra credit for practice. She represents the economics of the creek in the Creek Council. In "Craig to the Future", she works with Craig selling memorabilia and other items.
- Bobby Bobson (voiced by Ben Levin) is a small chubby boy who is always eating candy from a small bag and usually hangs around the Trading Tree, though he does pop up in other areas. A running gag has him constantly tripping over something while his candy spills out, causing him to utter "My candy!" in a nasally quiet voice. He represents the candy of the creek in the Creek Council, though he is mostly in it because he considers himself Craig's best friend. It is shown that he mentally harasses adults, usually just one, on Halloween to get his year supply of candy, even stalking them and breaking in to their car on their way to get more candy for him. In "Capture the Flag Part 5: The Game", Bobby has the ability to power up depending on how much candy he eats, or rather gets a sugar rush. In "Dude, Where's My Bobby?", it's revealed that his parents do not allow for him to have candy, explaining his obsession with it. In "Alternate Creekiverse", Bobby eats vegetables instead of candy. In "Craig to the Future", he gives up on candy and starts drinking smoothies, becoming physically fit and tall.

=== The Pirates ===
The Pirates are the main antagonists in Craig Before the Creek who traverse the Creek within a large pirate ship made entirely out of inflatables and floaties. By the end of the film, they disband.

- Serena (voiced by Vico Ortiz) is the captain of the Pirates. She came from an oceanside town where she loved hanging out with her friends until her family forced her to move. Hating her surroundings, she formed the Pirates and pillaged the Creek with the intent to use the wish maker to flood everything. Upon meeting Craig, and having several encounters with him, the two realized that they had a lot and common and she gave up her crazed pursuit. By the end, she disbands her pirates and decides to venture the Creek alone in a canoe.
- Hannah Le (voiced by Jolie Hoang-Rappaport) is a girl who was once part of the Pirates. She turned against Serena after learning her goal to flood the Creek and hid the map to the wish maker. Her family eventually moved away, but she hid her diary and information in the room that would eventually belong to Craig. Craig later mails her diary back to her as well as a thank you note.
- Teach (voiced by Phil LaMarr) is a large member of the Pirates who acts as the muscle of the group. He is named after Edward Teach, better known as Blackbeard.
- Nessie (voiced by Najia Porter) is a very tall and creepy girl who is always wet and pops up out of nowhere. She is named after and looks similar to Nessie, the nickname for the Loch Ness Monster.
- Kraken Kid (voiced by H. Michael Croner) is a lanky and flexible kid who wears swimming gear and extra clothes to imitate the creature of the same name. He can creepily crawl and run on all fours.

=== Other kids ===
- Isabella "Stacks" Alvarado (voiced by Montse Hernandez) is a girl who hangs out at the library and does other kids' book reports. She is a bibliophile, and is in a relationship with Kelsey (who loves fantasy novels). She wrote her own fantasy novel Para Llamar Mi Propia Estrella (To Call A Star My Own). She gets along surprisingly well with Wildernessa as they both speak Spanish. In "The Legend of the Library", she comments about how she fell for the "tragic romance" trope while with Kelsey before comparing it to a romance novel she read, implying she has feelings for her. In "Fire and Ice", she and Kelsey become a couple. In "Craig to the Future", she and Kelsey initially break up over a film adaptation of a book, but get back together.
- Junk Lord (voiced by Wilbur Zaldivar) is the ruler of the junkyard. He has trouble letting other kids borrow his things unless there is something in it for him. He represents the junk of the creek in the Creek Council.
- Paintball Mike (voiced by Phil LaMarr) – Co-leader of the 6th grade Paintballers and Paintball Benny's younger brother. He can be arrogant and cocky and talks like a typical war veteran. He represents his group in the Creek Council.
- Paintball Benny (voiced by Jon Gabrus) – Co-leader of the 7th grade Paintballers and Paintball Mike's older brother.
- Aaron (voiced by Gunnar Sizemore) is a short boy who in "Ace of Squares" has a secret crush on Kelsey. He finally asks her out in "Tea Timer's Ball" where he is incredibly nice. When Kelsey admits that she is not in love with him, he accepts this and moves on. However in "Jessica the Intern", it is shown that he now has a crush on Kit as he tries to ask her out.
- Sailor Boy (voiced by Phil LaMarr) is a fancy dressed boy who often spends time at The Creek.
- Priest Kid (voiced by Philip Solomon) is a religious boy who oversees many things at the Creek and runs the pet cemetery.
- Turner (voiced by Jessica DiCicco) is a young girl who is a sinister expert of the card game Bring Out Your Beast.
- Vanessa "Wildernessa" (voiced by Izabella Alvarez) is a wild girl who roams around in The Creek to help animals in distress. Her outfit consists of a torn teddy bear "hat", a red and white-stripped shirt, a leaf skirt, and is always barefoot. She is under the impression that Craig has zero understanding of animals, and thus has little to no respect towards him. In "Breaking the Ice", Craig calls her out for being demeaning towards him which is implied to be the result of bullying at school as everyone calls her "Mauly" because she mauled a student. By the end of the episode, it is revealed that her rudeness towards Craig is from hiding a crush on him, even performing what is implied to be a mating dance. In that same episode, it is revealed that she, ironically, does not know anything about bird behavior during the winter and in "Puppy Love" could not tell that Brigid was a girl in a dog costume. She represents the animals and nature of the creek in the Creek Council. She gets along surprisingly well with Stacks as they both speak Spanish. She almost reveals her feelings for Craig in "Capture the Flag Part 5: The Game" where she additionally taunts others for not knowing him as well as her. In "Puppy Love", they surreptitiously admit their mutual attraction to each other with Craig referring to her by her real name. In "Craig to the Future", Wildernessa and Craig are still dating though she has preoccupied herself with being an animal and nature rights activist.
  - Cheesesticks is Wildernessa's pet Tibetan Mastiff who is big enough to serve as her mode of transportation. In "Breaking the Ice", he begins to show favoritism to Craig when he points out how mean she is to him, but returns to her. In "Alternate Creekiverse", he is a giant cat.
- The Scratchless One (voiced by Evan Agos) is a small boy, whose name implies he is immune to poison ivy. In "Alternate Creekiverse", he has a muscle toned body. He reappears in the last episode "See You Tomorrow at the Creek", where he finally leaves his sanctuary to thank Craig for leaving his hiding spot off his map. He voice is noticeably deeper (primarily because his voice actor had gone through puberty).
- Beth the Timekeeper (voiced by Jessica DiCicco in seasons 1-3, Anasela Fisher in season 4) is a girl who plays a sousaphone at exactly 6:00 P.M. every day so that kids can go home and have dinner. She has trouble playing with other kids so she chooses to act as a reminder. The Stump Kids easily befriend her and learn her real name. She also acts as a caller for the Council of the Creek and is revealed to be able to play smooth jazz on a saxophone. In "Alternate Creekiverse", Beth is replaced with an African-American boy who plays a guitar.
- Scooter Girl (voiced by Erin Whitehead) is a girl who, as her name implies, rides a scooter. She appeared in "The Final Book", but did not make a reappearance until "The Bike Thief" where she reveals that she dislikes the 10-Speeds and that no one pays attention to her or even knows her real name.
- Jerry (voiced by Davis Pak in season 1, Ezrah Lin in season 4) is a young boy who, despite his diminutive and non-threatening appearance, is a force to be reckoned with. So much so that even Kelsey found him frightening. He stole Mark's favorite sword and used it against her.
- Big Red (voiced by Dana Davis) is a young girl with big fluffy red hair. She has a cutthroat competitive attitude.
- Brigid (voiced by Natalie Lander) is a cult like leader who worships dogs. She formed the Fredites, children who worship a local dog named Fred for his decision making. After Fred moved away, Brigid became power hungry and formed a dog owner training program that was really just a means of pampering her. She does not own a dog herself because her parents said she was too "intense".
- Roger (voiced by Matt Burnett) is a very disturbing and goblin-like child who loves to play in the mud and take on a role as a bridge troll because he thinks they are cool. Despite being something of a nuisance to the other kids, he means well and even rescued Craig from freezing to death one time. In Craig Before the Creek, it is revealed that he was once a forest fairy, but was too obsessed with riddles, resulting in him getting, presumably, kicked out of his group.
- Buttons (voiced by Lynden Liu) – Leader of the Plush Kids. She is always accompanied by her stuffed koala Steve whose arms attach to the buttons on her overalls. Just like her group, she can "hear" what her stuffed animal is saying.
- Sparkle Cadet (voiced by Kamali Minter) is a "magical girl" who tries to spread creativity. Her family moves around due to her parents' job which initially made her angry and distant. When she spilled craft supplies on herself, she took to her new look and decided to help other kids be more positive. She apparently lives in a condominium and, as implied in "The Sparkle Solution", is very good at math just like Craig.
- Secret Kid (voiced by Cole Escola) is a boy who collects the Creek Kids' secrets and has them written down in soda bottles. He genuinely respects their privacy and tries to maintain them in his lair which is a tree rooted in a river. He is never actually called Secret Kid, as his name is itself a secret. He wants to be friends with Marie of the Horse Girls as revealed in "Secret in a Bottle" and was confirmed as gay by the series' writers. A model sheet reveals that his real name is Ben. In the episode "Silver Fist Returns", it is revealed he has a crush on the Tea Timer member George.
- Deltron (voiced by Del the Funky Homosapien) is a "robotic" boy who claims to be from the year 3030 in search of music that can save the future. It is left ambiguous whether he truly came from that time. Deltron and his self-purported backstory is based on a character of the same name from Del's 2000 album Deltron 3030. If Deltron is who he says he is, then he is one and the same as the character from the album
- Paloma (voiced by Tiffany Ford) is a girl who had been jinxed by a friend who moved away before she could be unjinxed. The Stump Kids allow her to speak and she begins to take her aggression out on the other Creek Kids for ignoring her for a year. She is ultimately defeated by J.P. and becomes calm again. She has a soft, stilted way of speaking due to being quiet all this time. When the Kids from the Other Side took over the Creek, she was the only one to fully convert to them as seen in "Capture the Flag Part 5: The Game".
- Mer-kid are an androgynous looking child who likes to swim. They have a shaved head, nose plugs, and swimming attire that gives them a mer-like appearance. They do not speak and instead communicate in blowing bubbles in the water. They also have an unusual fascination with spreading salt in the water to give the Creek an oceanic like feel.
- Toman Napitapulu (voiced by Kaeden Hall) is a boy who was once the ace of four square in "Ace of Squares" until he started planting tomatoes. He is outgoing and constantly shows off a confidant attitude which usually results in him declaring his own coolness, much to everyone's annoyance. His family are Indonesian Christians.
- Angel José (voiced by Angel Lorenzana in seasons 2-3, Miss Benny in season 4) is a 10-year-old agender and the Owner of the Creek Daycare, who watches the creek kids younger siblings.
- Charmaine (voiced by Charmaine Verhagen) is a girl with big hair that covers her eyes. Bobby dislikes her for ruining his candy.
- Nate Moger III (voiced by Tony Revolori) is the owner of the World Creek Pencil Break Federation. He technically holds the title and fought J.P. for it. His pencil is actually a mechanical pen that nevertheless gets destroyed by J.P.
- Lil' Chris (voiced by Nick A. Fisher) is one of the kids at the Creek Daycare and J.P.'s "son" whom he "adopted" during the events of "Winter Break".
- "No-Neck" Natthew (voiced by Benjamin Valic) is a child who ate pop-rocks and drank soda at the same time resulting in his head exploding. He has become a Halloween legend and is the source of scary stories. People believe that he wears a pumpkin for a head, but actually wears different costumes, such as an astronaut, to hide his headless state. He is very sensitive about his name which he claims is a "family name". It is ambiguous whether he is truly headless, or simply playing along.
- Diane (voiced by Mela Lee) is a young girl whom Craig befriends while at Elder Con. She has a huge love for Slide the Ferret and all things pop culture related.
- Gordy (voiced by Brad Leone) is a tall goofy kid who plays hockey and attempts to recruit J.P. to his team.
- "No Teef" Keef (voiced by Matty Matheson) is a short stout kid who plays hockey and is missing his front teeth.
- Sun Chun (voiced by Anatola Howard) is a young girl who owns a giant hamster tunnel system at the Creek. She loves her own hamster Cookie, but when she was killed by a cat, became inconsolable. She now tends to a sunflower that grew in Cookie's place.
- Hyde and Zeke (both voiced by H. Michael Croner) are a pair of twins who love to play hide and seek. Zeke claims to have lost his twin brother. When Craig accuses him of making him up, he apparently admits this, only for it to be revealed that they are indeed twins. Though the tail end of the episode implies that there are actually more of them.
- Salma (voiced by Kathreen Khavari) is a Muslim girl who runs the Lost and Found and has a very advanced containment system. She lost a fish toy named Bubbles and had a very strict code on what returned items. However, when she learns that J.P. took Bubbles and it made his cat Goo happy, Salma decides to enact a five year lost policy so that other children can have a chance to play with forgotten items.
- Michelle Green (voiced by Michaela Dietz) is the previous holder of the Green Poncho identity. She trained Omar to protect the overpass as King Xavier exposed her as being a high schooler. She is shamed into a high school life and gives up her poncho to Omar. Based on her being in the same class as Cheyenne and Randy, it is implied that she was once friends with them until a similar situation drove them apart. She is later seen hanging out with Cheyenne and Randy again at when the Stump Kids visit her house to learn how to stop Xavier. In the Capture the Flag gang, she returns as the Green Poncho again to help Kelsey and Omar hold off Maya from reaching the overpass and win the game.
- Richard (voiced by Zachary Steel) is a selfish kid who likes to claims dibs and finders keepers on places and things that are special to other kids. He cares so little about others feeling when he takes their things, that if they want to trade, he tells them to put the object of trade on the ground, picks it up and claims finders keepers and takes their stuff as he just looks at his phone and searches the internet.

== Kids from the Other Side ==
The resident children of Herkleton Mills, which sits opposite of Herkleton. They live in a hierarchy-type society, similar to a caste system, and are led by a king who labels his subjects as "Best Friend", "Buddy" and "Pal" in decreasing order. They are all adorned in clothing resembling plants or flowers (e.g. Cherry Blossom, Coneflower, White Lily, etc.). In "Fan or Foe", it is revealed that the entire Other Side kingdom was inspired by an old anime show Haru King of the Forest where the elders of the Creek used to hang out with the original king of the Other Side, Kenneth, who enjoyed cosplaying as Haru, the main character of the show.

- King Xavier (voiced by Charles DeWayne) is the ruler of Herkleton Mills, the other side of the creek. He typically displays a happy and excited demeanor, giving his subjects balls and candy to their heart's content, but only based on how close of friends he considers them. However, underneath he is a ruthless sociopath, selfish, and dictator that plots to take over the other side of the creek. In "Sugar Smugglers", it is revealed that his wealthy parents spoil him and buy him all of the best candy and snacks and in large part, this contributes to his entitled personality, which allowed him to bribe more and more kids into building him a kingdom until they were all under his control because he thought it was the only way to make friends because he has almost none away from the creek. He inherited the title of king from his sister Cheyenne when she left for high school. In "Capture the Flag Part 5: The Game", he is finally overthrown by Craig who dismantles his regime, though he disappears afterward. Now an indoor kid, he acts in denial of losing, claiming he realized he's "too old" to keep being in the creek. He's now secretly spying on the Stump Kids in their quest for the Heart of the Forest with his drones. With training from his sister Cheyenne, he later becomes The Red Poncho, competing with Craig and stealing the remaining pieces of the cube to get to the Heart of the Forest, in hopes that he can become King again.
- Maya (voiced by Sydney Mikayla) was the King's right-hand woman and his "best friend" in the hierarchy. She has a cold demeanor because she was brainwashed and corrupted by King Xavier. She wields a bat as her weapon. She dueled Kelsey in "The Other Side", easily besting her and destroying her prized sword with her foot. Among her duties is ensuring no other candy or snacks come into Herkleton Mills, so the king can maintain complete control over his subjects. In "Into the Overpast", it is revealed she was once best friends with the Green Poncho/Omar and was kicked out of little league because of her feisty demeanor. She became Xavier's "best friend", but lost her friendship with Omar when they fought to be his right hand. She lost, but Omar decided to flee instead because he did not want to be friends with a selfish and entitled jerk like Xavier, thus allowing Maya to take up the role and taking the title of BFF from Cheyenne's best friend, Randy. In, "Capture the Flag Part 5: The Game" Maya is finally defeated by Kelsey, Omar and Michelle. When Omar attempts to reunite with her, she disappears, leaving her cape behind. She reappears in "Dodgy Decisions" where, after an awkward encounter, apparently mends her friendship with Omar. In "Craig to the Future", she and Kelsey maintain their friendship and are on the wrestling team together.
- Shawn (voiced by H. Michael Croner) is a member of the Honeysuckle Rangers and a "pal" of the hierarchy. He is very feisty and direct, and more willing to get the job done. He displays a form of dominance between him and Raj. While at first antagonistic against Craig, he becomes his ally when he sees through the king's selfishness.
- Raj (voiced by Parvesh Cheena) is a member of the Honeysuckle Rangers and a "pal" of the hierarchy. He is very calm, diplomatic and sometimes apologetic. He appears to have romantic feelings for Shawn which was confirmed in season 4. He used to be an enemy of Craig, but later becomes his ally.
- Keun Sup/The Blur (voiced by SungWon Cho) is the Champion of the Cherry Blossoms. He can run at incredible speeds. Following Xavier's defeat, he becomes friends with Craig and reveals that he is the slowest in his family; getting the nickname "Slow-Poke".
- Jackie/The Arm is the Champion of the Water Lilies. He is tall and lanky and perfect for tossing water balloons with pin point accuracy. In "Dodgy Decisions" he is revealed to be deaf and signs in ASL, which Keun Sup translates.
- Aggie/The Squashinator (voiced by Zehra Fazal) is the Champion of the Acorn Knights. She is a rather large girl who rides atop a smaller, slightly diminutive, Acorn Knight. She is very boastful and talks down to others, but is also quite sensitive and cries when she gets hurt. In "Capture the Flag Part 3: The Legend", she is revealed to excel at construction based projects, though Xavier does not care about this. Following his defeat, Aggie became embittered by Craig and decided to take up drawing to "defeat" him. In the end, the two became friends and shared tips.
- Cheyenne (voiced by Najia Porter) is the former queen of the other side and Xavier's older sister. She gave up the title when she entered high school.
- Randy (voiced by Matt Burnett) is Cheyenne's best friend and right hand. He has a very friendly jock-like personality and gave his title to Maya when he and Cheyenne left for High School.
- Kenneth (voiced by Lamar Abrams) is the first king of the other side and Xavier and Cheyenne's older brother. He has a more friendly attitude than his younger siblings and was friends with the Elders when they were kids. He created the King of the Creek persona by cosplaying his favorite anime character, Haru King of the Forest. When the overpass was built he couldn't visit his friends anymore and felt alone until other kids came and told him his costume was cool. After he grew older he gave the crown to Cheyenne, who then turned the crown over to Xavier when she got older. In "In Search of Lore", he is revealed to still be in touch with David of the Elders, but upon speaking with Mark, they have a falling out.

=== Rollerbladers ===
- Mariah (voiced by Amanda Grace Benitez) is the leader of a roller blading group from the Other Side. She admits that she and her team are out of practice because Xavier had initially banned all roller blading. She gives Craig the first piece of the cube.
- Dillard (voiced by Parvesh Cheena) is an inexperienced roller and the only boy in the group.
- Scoot (voiced by Dana Davis) is a stocky member of the rollers who is feisty.
- Razor (voiced by Charlet Chung) is an excitable member of the rollers.

=== The Kitchen ===
- Rick (voiced by H. Michael Croner) is the former head of the Other Side's kitchen. He spoke with a British accent (similar to Gordon Ramsay) and only knew how to make peanut butter sandwiches. After getting put in his place, he drops the accent and starts to learn new dishes.
- Tien Lam (voiced by Aleks Le) is a member of the Other Side's kitchen. He is very passionate about cooking and has an abundance of ideas. He beats Rick in a cooking contest and acquires a piece of the cube, which he later gives to the Stump Kids.
- Susan (voiced by Anairis Quiñones) is a large and joking member of the Other Side's kitchen.
- Ramil (voiced by Aleks Le) is a quiet and laid back member of the Other Side's kitchen.
- Elder Chef (voiced by Anairis Quiñones) is an elderly member of the kitchen who was able to briefly become young again after trying Tien's food.
