= Kimberly Hébert Gregory =

American actress (1972–2025)

- Born: Kimberly Rochelle Hébert; December 7, 1972; Houston, Texas, U.S.
- Died: October 3, 2025 (aged 52)
- Education: Mount Holyoke College (BA); DePaul University (attended); University of Chicago (MSW)
- Occupation: Actress
- Years active: 1996–2025
- Spouse: Chester Gregory (divorced)
- Children: 1

Kimberly Rochelle Hébert Gregory (née Hébert; December 7, 1972 – October 3, 2025) was an American actress. She began her career in theatre, appearing in such plays as Tarell Alvin McCraney's triptych, The Brother/Sister Plays, produced in 2009 at New York's The Public, and many others, before her breakthrough role as Dr. Belinda Brown in the HBO comedy series Vice Principals in 2016. She also voiced Nicole Williams in Craig of the Creek.

== Early life ==
Kimberly Hébert was born on December 7, 1972, in Houston, the youngest of three. She graduated from The High School for the Performing and Visual Arts in her native Houston. She received a BA in psychology from Mount Holyoke College in 1994, spent a term at The Theatre School at DePaul University for an MFA in acting, and earned a master's in social work from the School of Social Service Administration at the University of Chicago in 2002.

== Career ==
=== Theatre ===
Acting for the theater was Kimbery Hébert Gregory’s first love, if not her life partner, as she jokingly explained during a 2017 appearance on New York’s “Build Series.” After graduating from Mount Holyoke in 1994, Hébert Gregory moved to Chicago to attend Depaul's Theatre School and starred in a number of Chicago Theatre Company productions in the late 1990s, including McKinley Johnson’s Train is Comin' in 1996 and a theater adaptation of Walter Mosley's A Red Death in 1997. For her performance as "Daughter" in The Chicago Theatre Company's production of Shay Youngblood's Shakin' the Mess Outta Misery, she earned a Black Theatre Alliance Award and was nominated for a 1998 Equity Branch Jeff Award. The actor went on to play Ida Jackson in James Baldwin's The Amen Corner for the 2001–2002 season at the Goodman Theatre, also appearing that year as Zerbinette in the Court Theatre's production of Moliére's Scapin. Hébert Gregory was selected to participate in the 2006 Sundance Institute Theatre Laboratory (founded in 1969 by Robert Redford). Other roles included a part in Filloux, McCraney, and Sutton’s The Breach in 2008; Sadie in Elyzabeth Gregory Wilder's gospel play Gee's Bend at the Hartford Stage in 2010; Charmian in Shakespeare’s Antony and Cleopatra in 2010; Lanford Wilson’s The Hot L Baltimore at Steppenwolf's Downstairs Theatre in Chicago in 2011; Lisa Kron’s The Ver**zon Play at The Public in 2011; and Aunt Elegua/Shun in Tarell Alvin McCraney's Brother/Sister Plays in New York between 2009 and 2011, with a reprisal of the role in LA in 2012.

In 2012, Hébert Gregory was nominated for the Drama Desk Award for Outstanding Featured Actress in a Play and a Lucille Lotrel award for her performance opposite Sanaa Lathan in By The Way, Meet Vera Stark.

Her theatre acting work did not end there. Among others, in 2013, she appeared in Goddess, by Mkhululi Mabija and Michael Thurber at the Eugene O'Neill Theater Center; in 2016, she featured in Robert O'Hara's Barbecue, directed by Colman Domingo at LA's Geffen Playhouse; in 2019, she appeared in Black Super Hero Magic Mama by Inda Craig-Galván at the Geffen; and in 2020, she contributed The Homebound Project in work by Loy A. Webb. During her 2017 appearance on Build Series, the actor said she would always welcome theatre acting opportunities.

Hébert Gregory founded the theater non-profit, the Black Rebirth Collective (BRC), in 2017. According to its founder, the BRC was created to provide “a safe space” for Black women in the arts “to hone their skill” while necessarily taking the risks required to build “self-confidence in the work and in the failure.” The creative workshop and “gymnasium” has collaborated with the Geffen Playhouse to stage theatrical works written, read, and reworked within the BRC creativity hub, the “Be Real Incubator,” including Katori Hall’s The Mountaintop. Hébert Gregory also asserted that the BRC is “interrogating the kind of Black female images that we have long seen in theater, film, [and] television,” and was herself incubating a piece working with Song of Solomon, the early novel by one of her most revered creators, Toni Morrison.

=== Film and television ===
Hébert Gregory's first film role was in Chris Rock's romantic comedy I Think I Love My Wife (2007), after which she appeared in Spike Lee's Red Hook Summer (2012), Viviana Leo's White Alligator (2012), and The Genesis of Lincoln (never released). She first appeared on the smaller screen in the late 1990s in the CBS comedy Early Edition, going on to guest star on Gossip Girl, Law & Order, Grey's Anatomy, Private Practice, Two and a Half Men, and The Big Bang Theory. In 2014, she had a recurring role as Lucinda Miller in the Lifetime comedy-drama series, Devious Maids. In 2016, she starred as series regular Dr. Belinda Brown in the HBO comedy series Vice Principals, opposite Danny McBride. In September 2016, trade publication TheWrap described Hébert Gregory as the show's "breakout star."

In early 2017, she was cast opposite Toni Collette in the ABC action comedy-drama pilot Unit Zero produced by Kenya Barris, although ABC later declined to produce the series. She had recurring roles in Brooklyn Nine-Nine and Better Call Saul. Later in 2017, Hébert Gregory was cast in a female leading role in the ABC comedy-drama Kevin (Probably) Saves the World.

That same year, Hébert Gregory was cast on the Cartoon Network animated series Craig of the Creek, in which she had a starring role as Nicole Williams, the mother of the titular character. She also appeared in the 2023 spinoff Jessica's Big Little World and the 2023 prequel film Craig Before the Creek.

Hébert Gregory later appeared on The Act, The Chi and All Rise. In 2019, she co-starred in the romantic drama film Five Feet Apart.

In 2019, Hébert Gregory got the opportunity to work with sister Mount Holyoke college alum, Suzan-Lori Parks, who served as showrunner for the National Geographic anthology series Genius: Aretha, starring Cynthia Erivo. Hébert Gregory was cast as talent agent Ruth Jean Baskerville Bowen. In 2023, for the Netflix original animated limited series Carol & the End of the World, she voiced the titular character's bestie.

== Personal life and death ==
Hébert Gregory married fellow Chicago actor, Chester Gregory, with whom she had a son; the couple later divorced. Her death on October 3, 2025, was confirmed by her Vice Principals co-star Walton Goggins, who paid tribute to her on his Instagram account.

== Filmography ==
=== Film ===
Year	Title	Role	Notes
2007	I Think I Love My Wife	Babysitter	
2012	Red Hook Summer	Sister Sweet	
2012	White Alligator	Lauren Hamilton	
2018	Arizona	Debt Collector	
2019	Five Feet Apart	Nurse Barbara	
2019	Miss Virginia	Tasha White	
2020	John Henry	Tasha	

=== Television ===
Year	Title	Role	Notes
2007	The Black Donnellys	Head Nurse	Episode: "All of Us Are in the Gutter"
2007	Gossip Girl	Nurse	Episode: "Pilot"
2008	New Amsterdam	Nurse	Episode: "Golden Boy"
2010	Law & Order	Grand Juror #4	Episode: "Rubber Room"
2013	Private Practice	Kaye Ramsey	Episode: "Good Fries Are Hard to Come By"
2013	Two and a Half Men	Lisa	Episode: "This Unblessed Biscuit"
2013	Continuing Fred	Abigail Franklin	TV movie
2014	Shameless	Nurse	Episode: "My Oldest Daughter"
2014	I Didn't Do It	Mail Lady	Episode: "Dear High School Self"
2014	Do It Yourself	Denise	TV movie
2014	The Big Bang Theory	Ms. Davora	Episode: "The Anything Can Happen Recurrence"
2014	Devious Maids	Lucinda Miller	Recurring cast: Season 2
2014	Grey's Anatomy	Deborah Curzon	Episode: "Risk"
2015	Stanistan	Cynthia Stowe	TV movie
2015	The Soul Man	Regina	Episode: "Home Boyce"
2016	Baby Daddy	Miss Abigail	Episode: "The Return of the Mommy"
2016–2017	Vice Principals	Dr. Belinda Brown	Main cast: season 1, recurring cast: season 2
2017	Brooklyn Nine-Nine	Veronica Hopkins	Episodes: "The Audit" & "Serve & Protect"
2017	Better Call Saul	Kyra Hay	Episodes: "Sunk Costs" & "Sabrosito"
2017	Unit Zero	Brie	TV movie
2017	The Guest Book	Trina	Episode: "Story Six"
2017–2018	Kevin (Probably) Saves the World	Yvette	Main cast
2018	Every Other Weekend	Kimberly	Main cast
2018–2025	Craig of the Creek	Nicole Williams (voice)	Main cast
2019	Splitting Up Together	Sunshine	Episode: "Annie, Are You Okay?"
2019	The Act	Judge	Episode: "A Whole New World"
2019	The Chi	Kimberly	Episodes: "Every Day I'm Hustlin'" & "Past Due"
2019	Dollface	Prosecutor	Episode: "Fun Friend"
2019	Stumptown	Carol	Episode: "November Surprise"
2019	All Rise	DDA Tanya Gray	Episode: "Dripsy"
2020	Medical Police	Senator Barney	Recurring cast
2020	Future Man	Mathers	Recurring cast: season 3
2021	No Activity	Fuller (voice)	Season 4: Episodes 1 "It's Not a Cult," 3 "Magnolia," 7 "40 Days & 40 Nights," 8, "Breaking Bread"
2021	Genius: Aretha	Ruth Jean Baskerville Bowen	Main cast: season 3
2023–2024	Jessica's Big Little World	Nicole Williams (voice)	Main cast
2023	Carol & the End of the World	Donna Shaw (voice)	Main cast
2023	Craig Before the Creek	Nicole Williams (voice)	TV movie
