= Craig Before the Creek =

2023 American animated film

- Digital release film poster
- Directed by: Matt Burnett; Ben Levin
- Screenplay by: Matt Burnett; Ben Levin
- Story by: Matt Burnett; Ben Levin; Tiffany Ford; Ashleigh Hairston; Dashawn Mahome; Najja Porter; Jeff Trammell
- Based on: Craig of the Creek by: Matt Burnett and; Ben Levin
- Produced by: Lisa Zunich
- Starring: Philip Solomon; Noël Wells; H. Michael Croner; Vico Ortiz; Kimberly Hébert Gregory; Byron Marc Newsome; Phil LaMarr; Lucia Cunningham
- Edited by: Nick Lomauro; Mark T. Collins
- Music by: Jeff Rosenstock
- Production company: Cartoon Network Studios
- Distributed by: Warner Bros. Home Entertainment
- Release dates: December 11, 2023 (digital distribution); January 13, 2024 (TV)
- Running time: 88 minutes
- Country: United States
- Language: English

Craig Before the Creek is a 2023 American animated adventure comedy film that is a prequel to the Cartoon Network television series Craig of the Creek. The film was directed by series creators Matt Burnett and Ben Levin, co-directed by Naija Porter, and co-written by Burnett and Levin, with additional contributions from various writers. It stars the voices of series regulars Philip Solomon, Noël Wells, H. Michael Croner, Kimberly Hébert Gregory, Phil LaMarr, and Lucia Cunningham, with Vico Ortiz as Serena and Byron Marc Newsome reprising his role as Duane from the spin-off series Jessica's Big Little World.

In his desire to go back to his old home after recently moving into town with his family, Craig sets out on a journey to find the Wishmaker, a paper fortune teller that can grant any kid's wish hidden away in the nearby creek. He forms new friends with Kelsey and J.P., and the three are pursued by a fearsome band of pirates led by their captain, Serena, who seeks to use the Wishmaker to destroy the Creek itself.

Produced by Cartoon Network Studios, Craig Before the Creek was released on digital platforms on December 11, 2023, and debuted on Cartoon Network on January 13, 2024.

This movie marks Kimberly Hébert Gregory's final film performance before her death in 2025.

== Plot ==
Craig Williams has just moved to Herkleton with his family and already feels displaced. After a rough night, Nicole tells Craig to take his younger sister Jessica to the playground. While playing on the swings, Jessica's stuffed toy, Small Uncle, accidentally gets flung into the Creek and Craig ventures in for the first time to get it. He encounters all the strange kids including trading kid Kit who just so happens to have it. The kids are attacked by a pirate crew led by Serena who intimidates Craig and takes Small Uncle. Craig is rescued by a fantasy obsessed girl named Kelsey, and her pet parakeet Mortimer, but after that, she demands to be paid, which Craig does in Choco-rolls.

Later that night, Craig finds a diary in his room that belonged to the previous occupant Hannah, who reveals that she hid a wish maker somewhere in the Creek to hide from people like Serena. Craig resolves to find it so that he can wish for his old life back. He recruits Kelsey who reluctantly comes along. The two get a raft from Kit and venture down the Creek before encountering Serena and her pirates who imprison them. They encounter a gawky boy named J.P. who is a "torturer" in that nobody wants to be around him as he is bad at being bad. Serena reveals that she wants the wish maker so that she can flood the Creek. With J.P. switching sides, he, Craig, and Kelsey stage an escape.

Serena convinces her crew to stay through the dinner horn while Craig, Kelsey, and J.P. hide in a tree stump and phone each other's parents to make it seem like they are having a sleepover. Kelsey and J.P. reveal that if they get to wish anything, they want people to understand them. As they sleep, Craig gets up and decides to continue his quest alone. Kelsey and J.P. wake up to discover Craig's deception, but are captured by Serena's crew. Craig finds the ancient playground and opens a hidden entrance to an underground temple-like area where he finds the wish maker. As he performs the commands to get a wish, he starts to reflect on his time with Kelsey and J.P. Just then, Serena arrives with her crew and takes the wish maker.

Serena's wish is granted as the Creek suddenly begins to flood, but her crew abandons her out of fear and Serena is washed away. Craig, Kelsey, and J.P. take Serena's ship and after a motivational speech from Craig, the group steer the ship and find the wish maker on a rock along with Serena. While Craig activates the wish maker, Kelsey battles Serena, but she grabs it just as Craig finishes. Craig and Serena are transported to inside the wish maker where they battle each other using other kids' wishes. Craig later finds Serena's true wish, which was to return to her oceanside town which she was forced to move away from. Realizing that they shared the same wish, Craig convinces her to move on. The two of them wish for the Creek to be saved.

The rains stop as the Creek returns to normal, but the wish maker is destroyed. The kids all return to playing at the Creek with Serena's former pirate crew now acting nicer to the other kids. Serena decides to continue exploring the Creek on her own as Craig finally returns Small Uncle to a thankful Jessica. He further writes a thank you letter to Hannah and mails her diary back to her. Craig, now with a new appreciation for the Creek and his friends, meets up with Kelsey and J.P. and suggests that they continue having adventures in the Creek so that they can draw a map of their own.

== Voice cast ==
- Philip Solomon as Craig / Warpspeed
- Noël Wells as Kelsey / Bug Battler / Mortimor / Serena's Friend
- H. Michael Croner as J.P. / Kraken Kid / Bryan / Todd / Flag Kid / Serena's Friend
- Vico Ortiz as Serena
- Kimberly Hébert Gregory as Nicole
- Byron Marc Newsome as Duane
- Lucia Cunningham as Jessica
- Phil LaMarr as Bernard / Teach / Waterballoon Mike
- Jeff Trammell as James / Gibson / Cannonball
- Jolie Hoang-Rappaport as Hannah Le
- Zehra Fazal as Gala / Shannon the Scout / Tattoo
- Ben Levin as Bobby / Man On Bike / Tony / Jameolas
- Matt Burnett as Frog Master / Pokey / Roger / Monkey Kid
- Jessica McKenna as Handlebarb
- Gunnar Sizemore as Jason / Kah / Boom
- Andrée Vermeulen as Eliza / Andy
- Dana Davis as Kit
- Najja Porter as Kristenandra / Nessie / Cammy
- Analesa Fisher as The Timekeeper
- Terrence Hardy Jr. as Harry / Norman / Ankles
- Ashleigh Hairston as Renee / Wren
- Karen Fukuhara as Alexis

== Announcement and production ==
In January 2022, it was reported that Cartoon Network had green lit a fifth season of the television series Craig of the Creek. With it, the development of a film, then titled Craig of the Creek: The Movie, was also announced. It was said to be a prequel to the series. In September 2023, it was confirmed that the film would release some time later that year. In November 2023, the film's trailer, release date, and finalized title were revealed. Series co-creators Matt Burnett and Ben Levin were announced as directors and co-writers. Along with the returning cast members, Vico Ortiz was announced as the voice of the new character, Serena. Additionally, Byron Marc Newsome was confirmed to voice Duane Williams, reprising his role from Jessica's Big Little World.

The film's plot is inspired by Levin's experiences moving to Maryland as a kid and discovering the nearby creek by his house. Burnett and Levin wanted the film to be stand-alone and understandable to those unfamiliar with the series while also being special for long-time viewers. Thus, an origin story for Craig, Kelsey and J.P. was decided as the plot of the film. On Phillip Solomon's performance in the film, Levin said, "He’s such an amazing actor. This was a chance for him to just really show his range. He gets extremely silly but also gets super heartfelt". As in the series, H. Michael Croner improvised a lot of his lines for the film.

Saerom Animation and Warner Bros. Animation did additional work on the film. Burnett, Levin, and co-director Naija Porter wanted a more cinematic look for the film as compared to the series. To achieve this, new tools like Quantel were brought into the production pipeline. In addition, more lighting and shadows were added to give the creek a "magical" feel. The pirate ship is a CG model, and the crew had to get it to blend with their traditional animation. Artists from the series were brought on to work on backgrounds in the film, adding some "tweaks" for more detail. Porter then created a mock-up, and the artists used it as a reference for the backgrounds in the film, adding further steps to include all its detail. Specific brushes were used to show further texture and paint. The crew, for example, sought to show leaves and trees with more detail instead of them just being shapes. They, however, also strived to make it achievable within their fast schedule.

=== Music ===
Jeff Rosenstock, who composed the music for the series, composed the score and songs for the film. The film's music was recorded by Jack Shirley at The Atomic Garden Recording Studios, and includes several guests. In addition to some of the voice cast, performers include Rosenstock's band Death Rosenstock, Soul Glo's Pierce Jordan, Catbite’s Brittany Luna, Good Luck’s Ginger Alford, Rx Bandits’ Matt Embree, Linqua Franqa, and The Bruce Lee Band. The soundtrack album was released on January 15, 2024 by WaterTower Music.

== Release ==
Craig Before the Creek was released on digital platforms by Warner Bros. Home Entertainment on December 11, 2023. The film debuted on Cartoon Network on January 13, 2024, and on Max on the following day. It was released on DVD on March 26, 2024.

== Reception ==
Diondra Brown of Common Sense Media gave the film a 3 out of 5 star rating. They found it entertaining due to its charm and songs but felt it lacked the diversity angle that made the series special. Jon Mendelsohn of Comic Book Resources gave the film a 5 out of 10 rating and commended the animation and voice performances, but criticized the story and pacing. They concluded, "Craig Before the Creek is light and easy to digest, but anyone expecting a grand follow-up to the beloved Cartoon Network series may be disappointed." Anime Superhero praised the film as a great set-up for the series and an introduction for new viewers. They wrote, "Overall, the movie is a pretty entertaining prologue to the main series. It doesn’t exactly add anything new (other than maybe Serena) but does develop the main characters a bit more, and in hindsight, adds a little more to their personalities."

=== Accolades ===
Accolades received by Craig Before the Creek
Award	Date of ceremony	Category	Recipient(s)	Result	Ref.
Annie Awards	February 17, 2024	Outstanding Achievement for Voice Acting in an Animated Television / Broadcast Production	Vico Ortiz	Nominated	
Annie Awards	February 17, 2024	Outstanding Achievement for Storyboarding in an Animated Television / Broadcast Production	Erik Fountain	Nominated	
