= Mr. Roosevelt =

American film

- Theatrical release poster
- Directed by: Noël Wells
- Written by: Noël Wells
- Produced by: Michael B. Clark; Chris Ohlson; Alex Turtletaub
- Starring: Noël Wells; Nick Thune; Britt Lower; Daniella Pineda; Andre Hyland; Doug Benson; Armen Weitzman; Sergio Cilli
- Cinematography: Dagmar Weaver-Madsen
- Edited by: Terel Gibson
- Music by: Ryan Miller
- Production companies: Beachside; Sleepy Sheep; Revelator
- Distributed by: Paladin
- Release dates: March 12, 2017 (SXSW); October 27, 2017 (United States)
- Running time: 90 minutes
- Country: United States
- Language: English

Mr. Roosevelt is an American comedy film written, directed by, and starring Noël Wells. The film marks her directorial debut and also stars Nick Thune, Britt Lower, Daniella Pineda, Andre Hyland, Doug Benson, Armen Weitzman, and Sergio Cilli.

The plot follows Emily Martin (Noël Wells) as she returns to her hometown to say goodbye to her cat, and attempts to come to terms with her past while staying with her ex-boyfriend and his new girlfriend.

Mr. Roosevelt premiered at South by Southwest on March 12, 2017 and was released by Paladin on November 22, 2017. The film received positive reviews from critics.

== Plot ==
Emily Martin, a comedian living in Los Angeles, returns to her hometown of Austin, Texas after hearing from her ex-boyfriend Eric that their cat, Mr. Roosevelt, is ill. At the veterinarian's office, Emily learns from Eric and his live-in girlfriend, Celeste, that Mr. Roosevelt has already passed away. She is invited to stay at Eric and Celeste's house as a guest to discover that it has been drastically renovated from when she and Eric had shared it.

That evening, Eric and Celeste invite Emily to dinner with another couple. The atmosphere turns tense during a discussion when Celeste, who vaguely describes herself as an entrepreneur, presses Emily about her motivations for moving to Los Angeles due to the fact that her work as a comedian primarily involves commercial auditions.

Emily storms off and accidentally bumps into Jen, a restaurant server who she opens up to and ultimately befriends. The rest of the evening passes in awkward silence upon Emily's return.

The next morning, Celeste cheerfully presents Emily with a return flight to Los Angeles. Eric and Emily make coffee together, and as he heads off, he casually mentions that her things are in the shed.

Emily cycles into town and runs into Jen at her house. The two spend the day at a Greenbelt, where Emily meets Art (Andre Hyland) and quits her job over the phone. Cutting loose, Emily celebrates with some local youth at a swimming hole but eventually receives the message that Mr. Roosevelt's cremation is complete. Rushing to the vet, she learns Celeste has already picked up the ashes. Furious, Emily attempts to take the urn, but the couple informs her that they had planned a farewell brunch for Mr. Roosevelt.

Emily and Eric go out to eat while Celeste is busy and are invited to a house party where Jen's band is playing. Eric joins Jen onstage to cheer Emily up, and on the way home, he and Emily kiss. He quickly regrets the decision and admits he now wants a family. They begin to argue as Eric accuses Emily of being too self-absorbed to see how she has hurt him.

Upset, Emily sleeps with Art. The next morning, she cleans up and heads to the memorial brunch. Finding the situation absurd and lashing out at the party members for never having truly known Mr. Roosevelt, she takes the urn and rides to Jen's house.

While there, Emily explains her emotional outburst. When Jen tries to calm her with a splash of water, Emily dodges and spills the ashes. Overwhelmed, she breaks down in tears. After composing herself, Jen drives her to Eric's, where Emily leaves a goodbye note, clears out the shed, and catches a ride to the airport with Jen.

== Cast ==
- Noël Wells as Emily Martin
- Nick Thune as Eric Kline
- Britt Lower as Celeste Jones
- Daniella Pineda as Jen Morales
- Andre Hyland as Art
- Doug Benson as Todd
- Armen Weitzman as Andy
- Sergio Cilli as Tom
- Carley Wolf as Samantha

== Production ==
In March 2016, it was announced that Noël Wells would write, direct, and star in the film as the main character, Emily. Filming took place in Austin, Texas, and was shot on 16 mm film. The film's score was composed by Ryan Miller.

== Release ==
The film had its world premiere at South by Southwest (SXSW) on March 12, 2017, where it received a standing ovation from the audience. Shortly after, Paladin and Netflix acquired U.S. distribution rights. The film was released theatrically on October 27, 2017, and later became available on Netflix on December 26, 2017.

== Reception ==
On review aggregator Rotten Tomatoes, the film holds a 100% Tomatometer rating based on 35 reviews, with an average rating of 7.2/10. The critical consensus states: "Mr. Roosevelt offers an existential exploration of an entire generation through the microcosm of one woman's relationship with her cat."

On Metacritic, the film has a score of 73 out of 100, based on 13 critical reviews, indicating "generally favorable reviews".
