= Noël Wells =

American actress (born 1986)

- Wells at Dragon Con in 2026
- Born: Noël Kristi Wells; December 23, 1986 (age 39); San Antonio, Texas, U.S.
- Education: University of Texas at Austin
- Occupations: Actress; director; writer; illustrator; ventriloquist; singer/songwriter; musician; producer
- Years active: 2010–present
- Known for: Star Trek: Lower Decks; Master of None; Craig of the Creek; Mr. Roosevelt; Saturday Night Live

Noël Kristi Wells (born December 23, 1986) is an American actress, comedian, singer, and writer. She is known for her television roles as Rachel Silva in the Netflix comedy-drama Master of None (2015–2017), as the voice of Kelsey Pokoly in the Cartoon Network animated television series Craig of the Creek (2018–2025), as the voice of Ensign D'Vana Tendi in the Paramount+ animated series Star Trek: Lower Decks (2020–2024), and her brief tenure as a featured player on the NBC sketch comedy series Saturday Night Live during its 39th season between 2013 and 2014. She wrote, directed, and starred in the film Mr. Roosevelt (2017). She has also ventured into music; her debut album It's So Nice! was released in 2019.

== Early life ==
Wells was born in San Antonio, Texas. Her father is a Tunisian immigrant, and her mother is of Mexican descent. She says her parents named her Noël because she was born two days before Christmas.

Wells attended Memorial High School in Victoria, Texas, where she was active in speech and debate and graduated as salutatorian. She graduated from the University of Texas at Austin in 2010 with degrees in Plan II Honors and Radio-Television-Film. While attending college, she was a cast member of Esther's Follies, Austin's long-running musical satire show, where she performed in sketches and as a ventriloquist and magician's assistant. Before becoming an actress she worked as an editor and did motion graphics.

== Career ==
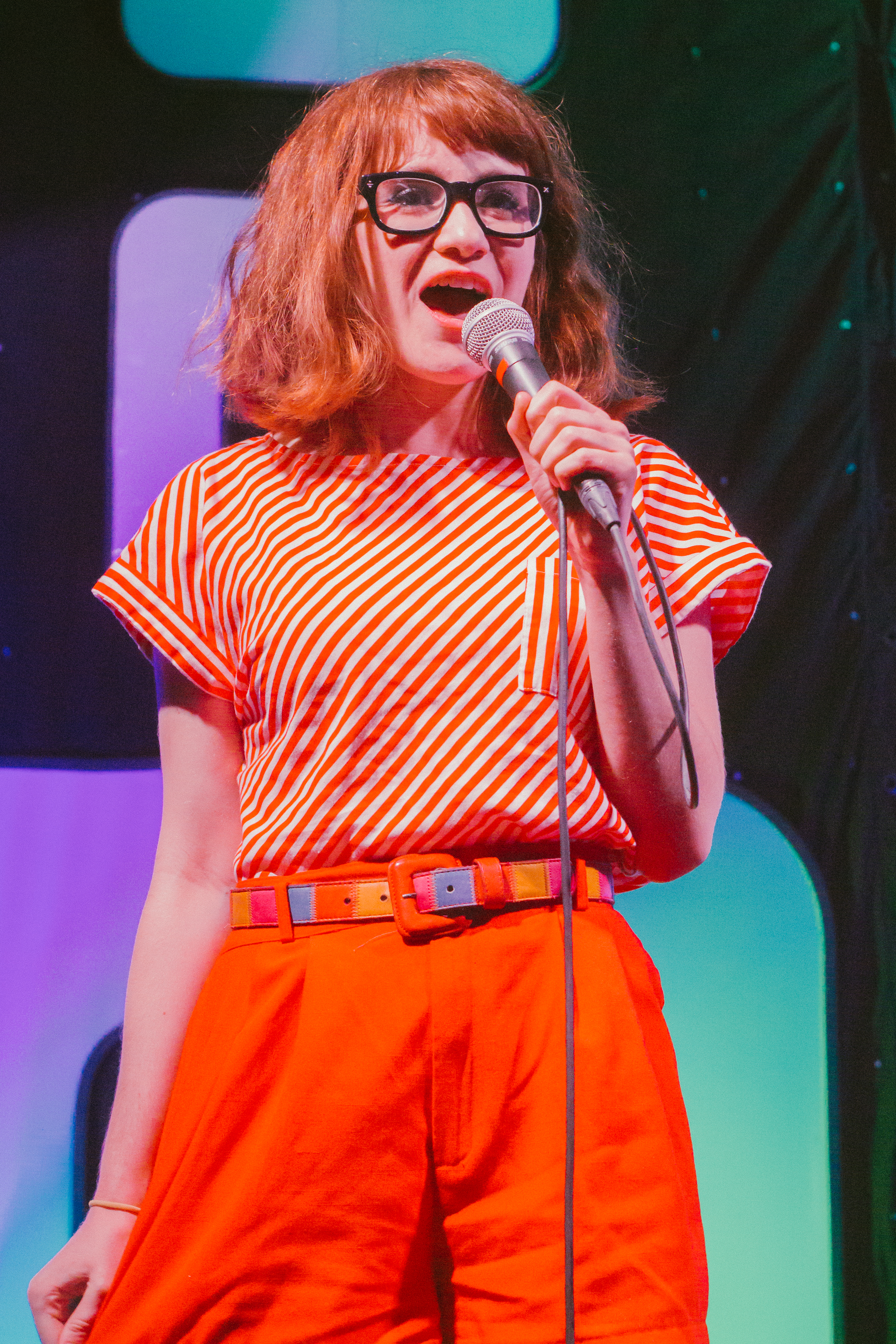
Wells performing in 2014

In 2010, Wells moved to Los Angeles and performed at the Upright Citizens Brigade Theatre with the sketch team "New Money". She appeared in numerous Cracked.com and CollegeHumor videos, and was known for her own sketch and parody videos, which have over 18 million views on YouTube.

In 2013, Wells joined the cast of Saturday Night Live during its 39th season as a featured player along with fellow Upright Citizens Brigade performers John Milhiser, Kyle Mooney, and Beck Bennett, as well as writer Mike O'Brien and stand-up comedian Brooks Wheelan. On July 15, 2014, it was announced that Wells would not be returning for a second season.

=== Saturday Night Live impressions ===
- Lena Dunham
- Zooey Deschanel
- Emma Stone
- Kristen Stewart
- Nancy Grace
- Robert Duvall
- Alyson Hannigan
- Reba McEntire
- Britney Spears
- Gwyneth Paltrow
- Kendall Jenner

Wells has made guest appearances on television programs such as The Aquabats! Super Show! and Comedy Bang! Bang!, as well as doing recurring voice work on Hulu's The Awesomes, Disney XD's Wander Over Yonder, and Cartoon Network's Craig of the Creek. In 2015, she co-starred on the critically acclaimed Netflix comedy Master of None, created by Aziz Ansari and Alan Yang. Wells played Rachel, the love-interest of Ansari's character. Hitfix's Alan Sepinwall said the "Dev/Rachel story is so smartly developed, with such strong chemistry between Ansari and Wells." Richard Lawson of Vanity Fair said her portrayal of Rachel was a "star-making...performance. It's subtle, but not minimalist or deadpan." All 10 episodes premiered on November 6, 2015, and it won the 2016 Critics' Choice Award for Best Comedy.

In March 2017, Wells wrote, directed, and starred in the feature film Mr. Roosevelt, which premiered at the SXSW film festival in Narrative Spotlight. It won multiple awards including the Audience Award and Louis Black Lone Star Jury Award at SXSW, and Best US Narrative Feature at the Traverse City Film Festival.

Wells released her debut album It's So Nice on August 30, 2019. Written and recorded over a two-year period, it was her first foray as a musician and singer-songwriter.

As of September 2019, Wells had a television show in development for the streaming service Apple TV+.

In 2020, Wells was cast as a voice actor in the animated series Star Trek: Lower Decks as Ensign Tendi, a new Orion crewmember (one of four main characters) aboard the USS Cerritos, working in the ship's medical bay.

== Personal life ==
Wells has lived in Los Angeles and New York City.

Her photography has been featured in exhibitions and the literary magazine Oxford American.

She is also an illustrator and her work has been featured in The New Yorker.

== Filmography ==
=== Film ===
Year	Title	Role	Notes
2013	Forev	Sophie	
2016	Dreamland	Joanna	
2017	The Incredible Jessica James	Tasha	
2017	Infinity Baby	Theresa	
2017	Mr. Roosevelt	Emily Martin	Also producer, writer and director
2018	Happy Anniversary	Mollie	
2018	Social Animals	Zoe	
2023	Craig Before the Creek	Kelsey Pokoly, Mortimer, Bug Battler, Serena's Friend	Voice role
TBA	The Adventures of Drunky	TBA	Voice role

=== Television ===
Year	Title	Role	Notes
2013	The Aquabats! Super Show!	Rachel Moonbug	Episode: "The Anti-Bats!"
2013–14	Saturday Night Live	Featured player	Season 39
2014	The Awesomes	Cait Walker / Knight Light	Voice role; 3 episodes
2014–16	Gentleman Lobsters	Shell	Voice role; 7 episodes
2015	Comedy Bang! Bang!	Aiden Tomasseto	Episode: "Kid Cudi Wears a Denim Shirt and Red Sneakers"
2015	Semi-Charmed Life	Alex	Television film
2015–16	Wander Over Yonder	Lord Dominator	Voice; 13 episodes
2015, 2017	Master of None	Rachel Silva	Main Role
2016	The UCB Show	Trish/Willow	Episode: "Feel the Bern"
2016	Loosely Exactly Nicole	Blix	Episode: "Big Break"
2016	American Dad!	Shannon/DreamSmith Entertainment Announcer	Voice role; 2 episodes
2017	Elena of Avalor	Marimonda	Voice role; Episode: "Realm of the Jacquins"
2018–25	Craig of the Creek	Kelsey Pokoly (2nd voice)	Voice role; Main role
2018	Rob Riggle's Ski Master Academy	Karen the Mermaid	Minor role; 2 episodes
2020	Kipo and the Age of Wonderbeasts	Jibralta	Voice role; Episode: "Benson and the Beast"
2020–24	Star Trek: Lower Decks	Ensign D'Vana Tendi	Voice role; Main role
2020	Wild Help	Jelly	Voice role; Pilot
2021	DuckTales	June	Voice role; Episode: "The Last Adventure"
2023	Star Trek: Strange New Worlds	Ensign D'Vana Tendi	Voice role; Episode: "Those Old Scientists"
2024	Jessica's Big Little World	Kelsey Pokoly	Voice role; 2 episodes
2026	Dang!	Greta	Voice role; Episodes: TBD

=== Web series ===
Year	Title	Role	Notes
2023	Star Trek: Very Short Treks	Ensign D'Vana Tendi	Voice role; 2 episodes

== Discography ==
=== Albums ===
- It's So Nice! (2019)
- Apples And Wine For My Baby Boo-Boo (2025)
