= Jessica's Big Little World =

American preschool television series

- Genre: Animated sitcom; Preschool
- Created by: Matt Burnett; Tiffany Ford; Ben Levin
- Based on: Characters by Matt Burnett; Ben Levin
- Voices of: Lucia Cunningham; Alani Ilongwe; Ozioma Akagha; Byron Marc Newsome; Kimberly Hebert Gregory; Phil LaMarr; Philip Solomon
- Theme music composer: Grace Hayes
- Country of origin: United States
- Original language: English
- No. of seasons: 1
- No. of episodes: 20

Production
- Executive producers: Matt Burnett; Tiffany Ford; Ben Levin; Sam Register
- Producer: Susy Campos
- Running time: 11 minutes
- Production company: Cartoon Network Studios

Original release
- Network: Cartoon Network; Cartoonito
- Release: September 20, 2023 – May 31, 2024

Related
- Craig of the Creek

Jessica's Big Little World is an American animated children's sitcom that aired as part of Cartoon Network's preschool block Cartoonito from September 20, 2023, to May 31, 2024. It is a spin-off of Craig of the Creek series that premiered in early 2018. In November 2023, the series was cancelled after one season.

== Plot ==
Jessica navigates her way through a world where everything seems much bigger than she is; inspired by the grown-ups around her, she persists in conquering monumental children's tasks.

== Characters ==
=== Main ===
- Lucia Cunningham as Jessica Williams
- Alani Ilongwe as Small Uncle
- Ozioma Akagha as Big Jessica
- Byron Marc Newsome as Duane Williams
- Kimberly Hébert Gregory as Nicole Williams
- Phil LaMarr as Bernard Williams
- Philip Solomon as Craig Williams

=== Recurring ===
- Lucas Sigler as Stanleigh
- Olivia Bynum as Poppy
- Lily Villegas as Mayra
- Nick Kishiyama as Felix
- Saundra McClain as Jojo Williams

=== Guest ===
- Phil Morris as Earl Williams
- Noël Wells as Kelsey Pokoly
- H. Michael Croner as J.P. Mercer
- Emi Lo as Big Kid

== Episodes ==
No.	Title	Written and storyboarded by	Original release date	Max release date	Prod. code	U.S. viewers (millions)
1	"Bedtime Routine"	Tiffany Ford & Dashawn Mahone	September 20, 2023	October 7, 2023	1106–007	N/A
Jessica wants to be a "big kid" and get ready for bed on her own, but she can't remember every part of her routine.
2	"Small Uncle's Big Bath"	Matt Burnett, Ben Levin, Tiffany Ford & Dashawn Mahone	October 3, 2023	October 7, 2023	1106–002	0.07
Jessica discovers her favorite toy is dirty and volunteers to give it a bath.
3	"The Big Kid Playground"	MeeMee Joi Gimes & Cid Snyder	October 4, 2023	October 7, 2023	1106–001	N/A
Jessica goes into the big kid part of the playground for the first time and befriends Stanleigh.
4	"Grocery Store Friend"	Georgia Henderson & Ian Mutchler	October 5, 2023	October 7, 2023	1106–008	0.07
While helping Duane at the supermarket, Jessica meets a new friend and has trouble staying focused on her responsibilities.
5	"Glow Toy"	Janice Chun & MeeMee Joi Gimes	October 6, 2023	October 7, 2023	1106–005	N/A
When Jessica can't get a new toy to work, she learns a new way to appreciate it.
6	"Sleepover"	Joshua Angeles & Jessica Galagher	January 1, 2024	January 2, 2024	1106–015	N/A
Jessica has a sleepover at her grandparents' house and must survive the night without her plush toy, Small Uncle.
7	"Little Twin"	Jessica Gallagher & Jesse Sawyerr	January 1, 2024	January 2, 2024	1106–006	N/A
When Jessica meets another kid at the park with an identical look as her, the two quickly form an unbreakable bond.
8	"Spike the Hedgehog"	Derrick Malik Johnson & Diana Kidlaied	January 1, 2024	January 2, 2024	1106–011	N/A
When Jessica petsits Stanleigh's pet hedgehog "Spike", she has to think on her feet.
9	"Jessica's Restaurant"	Georgia Henderson & Ian Mutchler	January 1, 2024	January 2, 2024	1106–012	N/A
Jessica opens a restaurant with her good friend Stanleigh, but will they be able to keep their customers happy?
10	"Family Photo"	Austin Faber & Gabriel Franklin	January 1, 2024	January 2, 2024	1106–013	N/A
When the family has to dress up for a family photo, Jessica decides to express herself.
11	"Drawing Time"	Janice Chun & MeeMee Joi Gimes	April 8, 2024	April 13, 2024	1106–010	N/A
When the TV goes out, Jessica and her friends make up their own story to entertain themselves.
12	"Jessica's Picnic"	Austin Faber & Gabriel Franklin	April 9, 2024	April 13, 2024	1106–017	N/A
Jessica and Nicole set out to have a fun picnic but run into challenges when everything goes wrong.
13	"The Secret Invention"	Austin Faber & Gabriel Franklin	April 10, 2024	April 13, 2024	1106–009	N/A
Jessica finds out Craig is working on a Secret Invention and sets out to help him with it.
14	"Big Kid Bike"	Janice Chun & MeeMee Joi Gimes	April 11, 2024	April 13, 2024	1106–014	0.08
Jessica wants to learn to ride a big kid bike.
15	"Rain Rescue"	Oliver Holguin & Ian Mutchler	April 12, 2024	April 13, 2024	1106–016	N/A
Jessica rescues her toys from the backyard as rain approaches.
16	"The Thumbsucker"	McKenzie Bugg & MeeMee Joi Gimes	May 27, 2024	June 1, 2024	1106–003	N/A
Jessica is determined to stop sucking her thumb, but kicking the habit is a lot harder than she realized.
17	"Pool School"	Janice Chun & MeeMee Joi Gimes	May 28, 2024	June 1, 2024	1106–018	N/A
Jessica has her first swim lesson and learns that everyone's body is different.
18	"Big Grow"	Janice Chun & Justin Horn	May 29, 2024	June 1, 2024	1106–004	N/A
Jessica attempts to grow bigger in size to reach her favorite snack.
19	"Mystery Toy"	Jessica Gallagher & Derrick Malik Johnson	May 30, 2024	June 1, 2024	1106–019	N/A
Jessica and her friends find a toy at the playground, but end up having trouble sharing.
20	"Sick"	Jessica Gallagher & Andrea Cabral	May 31, 2024	June 1, 2024	1106–020	N/A
With Jessica feeling under the weather, Small Uncle tries to cheer her up.

== Production ==
On February 17, 2021, it was announced that a preschool spin-off series centered on Craig's little sister Jessica was in development. Titled Jessica's Big Little World, the new series was set to air as part of Cartoon Network's Cartoonito preschool block. On January 19, 2022, it was announced that the series would premiere in 2023.

In October 2022, it was announced that the first season of the spin-off would be cut in half by Warner Bros. Discovery. In July 2023, it was announced the series would air as part of the regular Cartoon Network schedule, in addition to Cartoonito. A sneak peek of the series aired on September 20, 2023, and officially premiered on October 2, 2023.

In November 2023, it was announced that the series was cancelled after one season.

== Broadcast ==
Jessica's Big Little World premiered on Cartoonito UK on July 1, 2024.

== Accolades ==
Award	Date of ceremony	Category	Recipient(s)	Result	Ref.
Annie Award	February 17, 2024	Outstanding Achievement for Character Design in an Animated Television / Broadcast Production	Nick Winn (for "Bedtime Routine")	Nominated	
Annie Award	February 8, 2025	Best Animated Television/Broadcast Production for Preschool Children	"Jessica's Picnic"	Nominated	
Annie Award	February 8, 2025	Outstanding Achievement for Writing in an Animated Television / Broadcast Production	Austin Faber, Gabriel Franklin, Shawneé Gibbs, Shawnelle Gibbs, and Ashleigh Hairston (for "Jessica's Picnic")	Nominated	
Children's and Family Emmy Awards	March 15, 2025	Outstanding Younger Voice Performer in an Animated or Preschool Animated Program	Lucia Cunningham	Nominated	
Children's and Family Emmy Awards	March 15, 2025	Outstanding Writing for a Preschool Animated Program	Tiffany Ford, Ashleigh Hairston, Shawneé Gibbs, Shawnelle Gibbs, Matt Burnett, Ben Levin, Dashawn Mahone, Janice Chun and MeeMee Joi Gimes (for "Glow Toy")	Nominated	
