= Ruth Bowen =

- Born: Ruth Jean Baskerville; September 13, 1924; Danville, Virginia
- Died: April 21, 2009 (aged 84); New York City, New York, U.S.
- Other name: Ruth Jean Bowen-Bryant
- Occupations: Talent agent, businesswoman
- Known for: President of Queen Booking Corporation

Ruth Jean Bowen (née Baskerville, later Bryant or Bowen-Bryant; September 13, 1924 – April 21, 2009) was the first black female talent agent and the president of Queen Booking Corporation, the largest Black-owned entertainment and talent agency in the world. It represented many of the United States' top African-American performers.

== Early life and education ==
Ruth Jean Baskerville was born to Marion Baskerville and Claude Carlton on September 13, 1924, in Danville, Virginia. Her mother was African-American and French and her father was an English-born Irishman. She grew up with three older white half-sisters and her brother James Edward Goode. She attended Westmoreland Elementary School and Langston High School in Danville before moving with her family to Brooklyn, New York, where she attended Girls' High School. She studied at New York University for two years before getting married.

== Career ==
After marrying in 1944, she initially gained hands-on experience in the entertainment industry by handling her husband Billy Bowen's business affairs. A singer, he was one of the original members of The Ink Spots, and toured with them around the country in the 1940s and 1950s.

Bowen really started her career via an introduction to singer Dinah Washington; there are two versions of their first meeting. According to one source, while on tour with her husband and the Ink Spots in Pittsburgh, Bowen spotted Washington's tour bus and her husband introduced them. Another story is that "Major Robinson, a nationally syndicated columnist, introduced Bowen to Dinah Washington in 1945." Both sources seem to agree, however, that this initial meeting is what led to Bowen becoming Washington's personal publicist and manager. While working with Washington and her booking agent, Joe Glaser, Bowen learned a great deal about the entertainment industry in general, and about booking artists more specifically.

Using David Dinkins as her lawyer (he was later elected as mayor of New York City), Bowen got her booking license from the State of New York. Together with Washington, she started a booking agency, Queen Artists, in 1959. By 1964, after the death of Washington, Bowen renamed her company as the Queen Booking Corporation. She handled all types of talent, from "...individual singers to soul-rock groups to gospel choirs to comedians."

QBC represented, among others, Aretha Franklin, Ray Charles, Sammy Davis Jr., the Isley Brothers, Dionne Warwick, The Four Tops, Kool and the Gang, Bobby Womack, and Teddy Pendergrass.

== Personal life ==
Ruth Bowen married William "Billy" Bowen, one of the original members of The Ink Spots, in 1944. They were married until his death in 1982.

She married again, to Clarence "Billy" Bryant. Bowen died at the age of 84 on April 21, 2009, in New York City after battling brain cancer. When she died, she was survived by Bryant, her brother James Edward Goode, and sister-in-law Jean.
