= The Right Number =

2003 infinite canvas webcomic

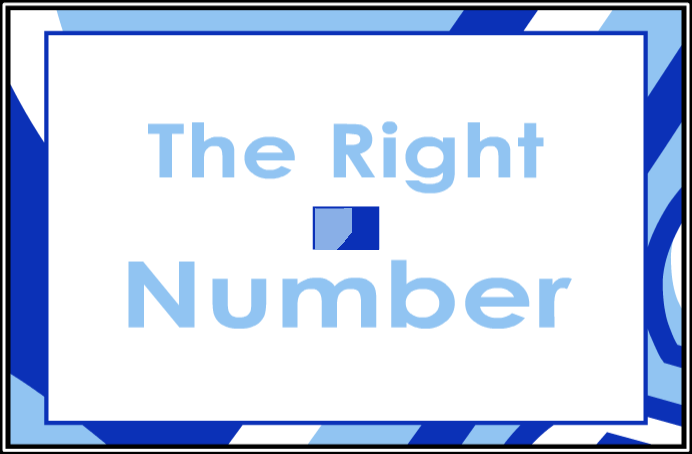
- Title card
- Author: Scott McCloud
- Website: scottmccloud.com
- Current status/schedule: Stopped
- Launch date: June 30, 2003

The Right Number is an infinite canvas webcomic by Scott McCloud. The webcomic makes use of an experimental zooming user interface, where each subsequent panel is nested inside of the panel that comes before it. The Right Number follows a man who discovers that one can figure out someone's character traits based on their phone number, and starts to abuse the patterns he finds to search the perfect girlfriend. The story is focused on obsession and how it is impossible to find the perfect mate. Two of its three parts were published in 2003 through the BitPass micropayment service McCloud was a consultant for at the time. The third part was never released, and when BitPass went under in 2007, McCloud released the two existing parts of The Right Number for free.

== Concept ==
A tiny panel is nested inside of the current panel.

Scott McCloud has been advocating the concept of the infinite canvas since he wrote about it in his 2000 book Reinventing Comics, as he believes that webcomics may revolutionize the way long-form comics are created and read. The Right Number uses Flash animation to create a seamless transition between any two panels. The webcomic is set up so that at the center of each screen-filling panel lies a very small version of the next panel. The reader can click on an arrow below the webcomic or use the navigation keys to zoom in on this tiny panel so that it in turn fills the screen. McCloud described this layout as a "long chain of panels, one behind the other, with a hole in the center of each of them; so the reader is successively moving in on each of the panels in order to see the next." The layout of The Right Number preserves a visual link between panels or pages that traditional webcomics lack, as readers aren't taken out of the experience as they may when using a hyperlink to move to the next page. The Right Number has an advantage over infinitely-scrollable webcomics in that it preserves the rhythm of reading the comic, while scrollers may start to "drag on and on." The time the webcomic spends zooming in on panels forces the reader to pace themselves.

== Synopsis ==
The Right Number follows a man who accidentally meets up with a stranger rather than his own girlfriend after misdialing a phone call. The woman he meets looks and behaves significantly like his girlfriend, and the protagonist finds that she is a "better version" of his girlfriend. He starts to experiment with his phone, and discovers a pattern where women with similar phone numbers have similar character traits. He then abuses this system to find the perfect girlfriend, as he starts to obsess over the smallest details. McCloud describes The Right Number as "a story about obsession" and calls this a theme he returns to often. In an interview with Joe Zabel, McCloud said that he is "pessimistic about the wisdom of trying to find the perfect mate," which is what the protagonist of his webcomic fails to understand.

== Publication ==
Scott McCloud was contacted by the founders of BitPass in November 2002, and liking their implementation of micropayments – a model McCloud had advocated for years – he became a consultant. The first part of McCloud's The Right Number was released online on June 30, 2003, to coincide with the launch of BitPass. The part could be bought worldwide for $.25 USD, and a purchase remained good for 180 days. The Right Number was to be released in three parts, each about five weeks apart. However, the third part was indefinitely delayed – initially due to tendinitis in McCloud's hands, and later because McCloud started working on Making Comics. When BitPass ceased operation in 2007, the two parts of The Right Number were released free of charge. The webcomic received attention from non-comic readers who were interested in the outcome of McCloud's micropayment system; in the four years BitPass was in place, McCloud sold just under 2,300 copies of The Right Number.

== Reception ==
In 2011, David Balan of Sequart Organization praised McCloud's webcomic for successfully crafting a new reading convention, calling it far superior to existing formats. Karin L. Kross of Bookslut noted in a review of the first part of The Right Number that it is tempting to "[argue] over whether the use of the form and technology is sufficiently 'innovative,'" but that such discussions lose sight of the more important questions of whether the story is worth reading and the art is worth looking at. In the case of The Right Number, Kross answered both of these questions with "yes".
