= Infinite canvas =

Aspect of webcomics

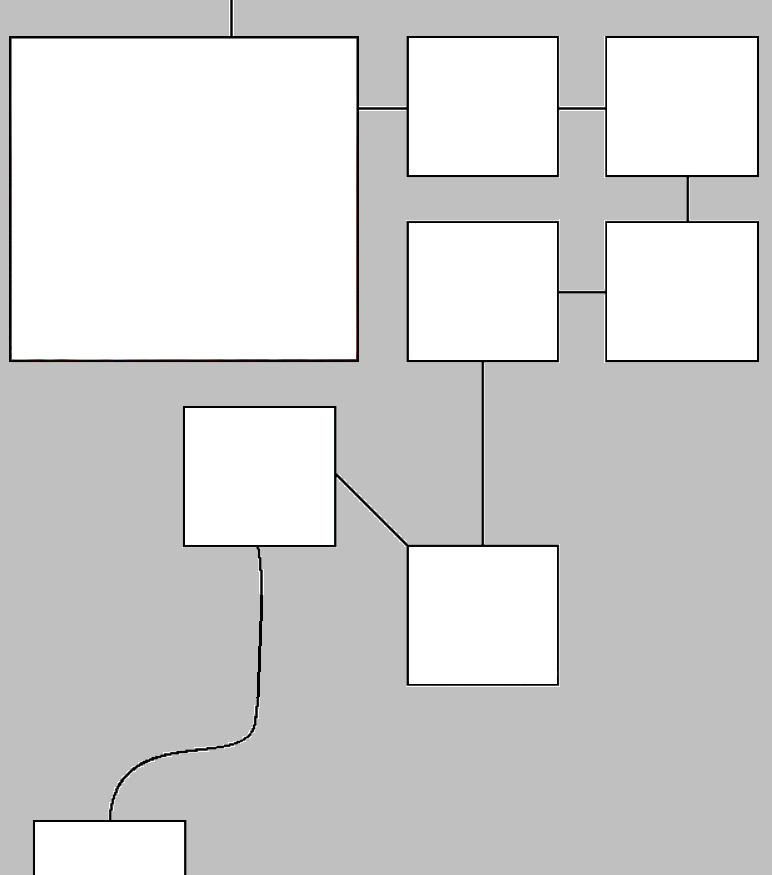
Scott McCloud described the possibility of linking webcomic panels using "trails", suggesting it offers distinct storytelling advantages.

The infinite canvas is the feeling of available space for a webcomic on the World Wide Web relative to paper. The term was introduced by Scott McCloud in his 2000 book Reinventing Comics, which supposes a web page can grow as large as needed. This infinite canvas gives infinite storytelling features and creators more freedom in how they present their artwork.

Journalists responded doubtfully, because five years after the publication of Reinventing Comics, the concept had not been widely adopted. Webcomics were primarily presented in the form of comic strips, which fit easily on a screen. Many artists experiment with the infinite canvas, however, and comics growing beyond what is possible in print has gained some popularity over the years.

== Description ==
In comic books, the panels are fit according to the page, thus limiting artists to few arrangements for each page. In his 2000 book, Reinventing Comics, cartoonist Scott McCloud proposes that a web page solves the problem. Instead of making the monitor the "page", McCloud suggests making it a "window" upon an infinite canvas. A webcomic artist could give a reader an ability to zoom in and out rendering the comic infinitely large. McCloud wrote that webcomics could be made any shape: vertically like a tower, horizontally like a skyline, diagonally like a descending staircase, or even three dimensionally like a revolving cube.

According to David Balan of Sequart Organization, some webcomics might require small size pages (due to slow internet) and using hyperlinks to move forward in the story consistently takes the reader out of the experience, because there exists no visual link between any two pages. Balan praised McCloud's 2003 webcomic, The Right Number, for its zooming interface, which would have the same benefits as other infinite canvas formats, but still allows for a certain rhythm to exist. Other artists known for making persistent use of the infinite canvas in the early 2000s include Cayetano Garza, demian5, Patrick Farley, Tristan A. Farnon, and David Gaddis.

== Usage ==
In 2005, Daniel Merlin Goodbrey created the "Tarquin Engine", a piece of Web software that uses Adobe Flash to depict an infinite canvas that a reader can freely scroll through and zoom in on. It greatly simplified the production of infinite canvas webcomics. The tool is not widely used. In 2009, Microsoft Live Labs released an infinite canvas web application, which reached a wider audience.

In 2013, Yvyes Bigerel and Mark Waid of Marvel Comics launched an initiative to create and publish digital comics under the title Marvel ReEvolution. While creating these webcomics, Bigerel and Waid were inspired by the manner in which time is experienced within comics, as the passage of time in a comic book is ultimately controlled by its reader. Rather than to allow readers to skim through the images on a whim or to increase the space between panels as McCloud suggested, the duo stacked the panels up "like a PowerPoint slideshow," forcing the reader to look at one panel at a time. According to Comic Book Resources, this design directly affects how a comic is created and read, as surprises can be better controlled and a letterer could directly control the reading order of text balloons. Rachel Edidin of Wired said of Wolverine: Japan's Most Wanted and Iron Man: Fatal Frontier that "these are comics that truly feel native to the digital format."

In 2016, Oculus Story Studio released Quill, a piece of software that allows people to create a three-dimensional world on an "infinite canvas", meant to be experienced through virtual reality. In September 2021, Facebook, now the owner of Oculus, sold Quill to its original creator, who continues to develop and support the app.

== Reception ==
In 2005, Sarah Boxer of The New York Times stated that the infinite canvas was hard to find in use, as many webcomics were sticking to a printable format. A few, however, like Nicholas Gurewitch's The Perry Bible Fellowship and Drew Weing's Pup, did make use of the format (Pup won a Web Cartoonists' Choice Award in the "infinite canvas" category in 2005). Boxer pointed out that most popular webcomics either fit on a webpage easily – such as Adrian Ramos's Count Your Sheep – or attempted to use various aspects of the digital medium, such as Flash animation and music. That same year, Joe Zabel also noted that the primary purpose for the infinite canvas would be to create lengthy and deep works on the Web, while comic strips like PvP and Penny Arcade showed to have much more success in this environment. Because of the time that would go into any page of an infinite canvas comic, Zabel deemed it unlikely for such webcomics to gain a large popularity. Journalist Eric Burns, meanwhile, claimed that McCloud was mainly discussing the potential of webcomics, rather than what they are actually like.

In an interview in 2008, Scott McCloud said that in Reinventing Comics he was "shooting for the moon, in hopes that we could create these radical departures from traditional comics," noting that "most online comics are still pretty conservative in format and style" but also that "there have been some impressive strides in that direction." McCloud specified that he was still keeping an eye on things that needed to happen for the infinite canvas to take off, saying that "the notion of Web applications being as robust as desktop applications has placed us closer to that hope that we may finally be able to create those spaces in a seamless way online. Right now, it's very difficult to do that." In an interview in 2014, McCloud said that "without a reliable financial structure to support these experimental webcomics, a lot of people just turn away and get a real job, or start doing three-panel gag strips. Those have an economic model that works."

Regardless of the format's initial popularity, a large amount of cartoonists have created infinite canvas webcomics over the years; in the book Storytelling in the Media Convergence Age, cartoonist Daniel Goodbrew states that "the infinite canvas has remained a popular choice among webcomic creators." The infinite canvas has shown more success in Europe and Australia than in North America. The infinite canvas has obtained a large popularity among South Korean webtoons: McCloud noted in 2014 that "most digital comics are scrollers in Korea."

== See also ==
- Marvel Comics formats:
  - Infinite Comics (horizontal, on-screen direction)
  - Infinity Comics (vertical scrolling)
