= Cayetano Garza =

American cartoonist

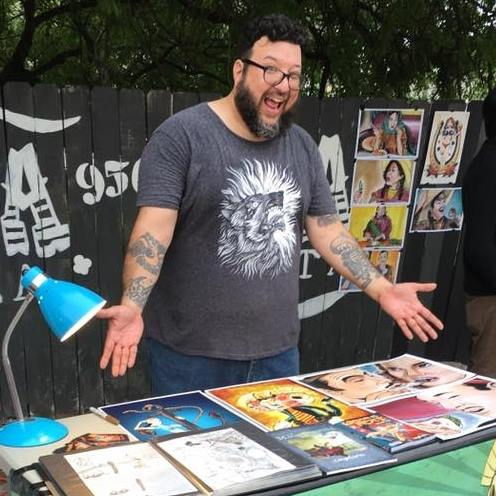
- Cat Garza selling work at La Pla Art Market in Harlingen, Texas
- Born: October 15, 1972 (age 54) Harlingen, Texas, U.S.
- Area: Cartoonist
- Notable works: Cuentos de la Frontera; The Year of The Rat
- Awards: Ignatz Award, 2009

Cayetano 'Cat' Garza (born October 15, 1972) is a comic artist, cartoonist, illustrator, and musician in the United States. He is best known for his experiments with webcomics.

Garza has been published in various anthologies and publications. He is considered by Scott McCloud, author of Understanding Comics, as a pioneer in the area of web design and interface for online comics. Garza is featured in McCloud's sequel to Understanding Comics, Reinventing Comics, and on his website. He has also been featured in Toon Art: The Graphic Art of Digital Cartooning by Steven Withrow.

== Biography ==
Garza was born and raised in the Rio Grande Valley in the city of Harlingen, Texas on October 15, 1972. His interest in comics stems from a day in his early youth when, as a six-year-old child, his mother bought him his first comic, an issue of The Flash. In second grade he sold homemade comics with a cast characters that included the likes of "Glue Man" to his classmates for a quarter or their lunch ticket. As a child he typically read superhero comics, but what really caught his attention was the humor comic Captain Carrot and His Amazing Zoo Crew!. He also read a number of comic strips, including Peanuts and Ripley's Believe It or Not!.

Garza's formal artistic training started with a few high school art courses. He went on to get his Bachelor of Fine Arts at UTPA, concentrating on studio art. He started grad school, dropped out after only one year.

Creating strips throughout high school and college Garza was heavily influenced by the comic scene in Austin, Texas, including artists who had strips in The Daily Texan, such as Chris Ware, Walt Holcombe, Shannon Wheeler, Robert Rodriguez, Tom King, Lance Myers, and Korey Coleman. Many of his comics during this period contain reflections of youthful righteous indignation directed at the atrocities of the world.

As a student at UTPA, Garza had access to a free website provided by the university. This was the catalyst for the idea of publishing strips online. In 1996, he put samples of his work online for publishers to see when he sent them submissions packages. Soon after it occurred to him that using the web he could self-publish. To create his comics he hand codes HTML in combination with GIF and JPEG images.

After college he spent a while in Austin as a street artist. He appeared in Adventures Into Digital Comics, a 2006 documentary on the comics industry.

In 2009 his webcomic The Year of The Rat won the Ignatz Award for Outstanding Online Comic.

In addition to his work as a comic artist, Garza is also a musician. He played guitar in the Vermont band, The Wheelers before returning to Texas in 2011.

Garza's current comic strip, Whimville, runs daily. His other ongoing comic strip for Modern Tales, Cuentos De La Frontera, has been featured in articles in news outlets such as Wired, Playboy, Austin American-Statesman, and The Austin Chronicle.

== Notable publications ==
- Rampage Anthology, Slapp Happy Comics, 1997, designer/contributor
- Magic Inkwell presents Cosmic Carrot #1, Magic Inkwell Studios, 1998, creator/writer
- Love in Tights #1, Slave Labor Graphics, 1998, cover/contributor
- Magic Inkwell Comic Strip Theatre Minicomics #'s 1-4, Magic Inkwell Studios, 1998, creator/writer
- World's Funnest Comics #1, Moordam Comics, 1998, contributor
- SPX '99 Anthology, Small Press Expo, 1999, contributor
- Moordam Christmas Special #1, Moordam Comics, 1999, contributor
- BrainBomb #1, Behemoth Books, 1999, cover/contributor
- Certified Cool #1, Moordam Comics/Slapp Happy, 1999, contributor
- Magic Inkwell weekly strip, Magic Inkwell Online, 1999, creator/writer
- Magic Inkwell Comic Strip Theatre Minicomic #5, Magic Inkwell Studios, 1999, creator/writer
- Syndicated strip, South Texas Entertainment, 1999–2000, South Texas Entertainment Magazine (STEM)
