= Flinch (comics) =

Horror anthology from Vertigo Comics

Publication information
- Publisher: Vertigo Comics
- Schedule: Monthly/Bi-monthly
- Format: Standard
- Genre: Horror
- Publication date: June 1999 – January 2001
- No. of issues: 16

Flinch is a Vertigo Comics horror anthology.

It ran 16 issues from June 1999 until January 2001 and featured the talents of Jim Lee, Bill Willingham, Frank Quitely, Joe R. Lansdale, and many others. Rumours of cancellation seemed to plague the book throughout its run.

Timothy Truman said of the series: "...the best art I've done in any single comics story is on the "Brer Hoodoo" short story I did with Joe for Vertigo's Flinch anthology".

== Issue guide ==
#	Date	Cover artist	Story	Story writer	Story artist
1	June 1999	Phil Hale	Rocket-Man	Richard Bruning	Jim Lee
			Nice Neighborhood	Jen Van Meter	Frank Quitely
			Wolf Girl Eats	Bruce Jones	Richard Corben
2	July 1999	Richard Corben	Maggie and her Microscope	Dean Motter	Bill Sienkiewicz
			Found Object	Bob Fingerman	Pat McEown
			Food Chain	Brian Azzarello	Eduardo Risso
3	August 1999	Sue Coe	Night Terrors	John Rozum	Kelley Jones
			A Walk in the Park	Scott Cunningham	Marcelo Frusin
			Satanic	Garth Ennis	Kieron Dwyer
4	September 1999	José Villarrubia	A Gift of Friendship	Kent Williams	Kent Williams
			Fair Trade	Ty Templeton	Ty Templeton
			Playing Dead	Bruce Jones	Paul Gulacy
5	October 1999	Tim Sale	Betrothed	Joe R. Lansdale	Rick Burchett
			Peeping Bob	Colin Raff	James Romberger
			Fumes	Mark Wheatley	Marc Hempel
6	November 1999	Kent Williams	Dead Woman Walking	William Messner-Loebs	Duncan Fegredo
			El Ogro	Ivan Velez, Jr.	Ho Che Anderson
			The Day Wife	Phillip Hester	Ande Parks
7	December 1999	John Mueller	Parade	Devin Grayson	Phil Jimenez
			The Toy	Jim Woodring	Randy DuBurke
			It Takes A Village	Bill Willingham	Bill Willingham
8	January 2000	Jae Lee	Guts	Greg Rucka	James Romberger
			You've Got Hate Mail	Robert Rodi	Marcelo Frusin
			The Lotus Shoes	John Kuramoto	Jon J Muth
9	February 2000	Alex Ross	Mostly White	Bruce Jones	Dave Taylor
			The Harvester	Thom Metzger	Sean Phillips
			Sitter	Steven T. Seagle	John Estes
10	March 2000	Edvin Biukovic	Last Call	Brian Azzarello	Danijel Žeželj
			In the Pink	Ken Rothstein	Frank Teran
			The Mule	Tony Bedard	David Lloyd
11	April 2000	Phil Hale	Red Romance	Joe R. Lansdale	Bruce Timm
			Emergent	John Rozum	Cliff Chiang
			Prepacked	Ian Carney	Dave Taylor
12	May 2000	Mitch O'Connell	Watching You	Bruce Jones	Frank Quitely
			Tin God	John Arcudi	Ryan Sook
			Mondays	Scott Cunningham	Essad Ribic
13	July 2000	Rick Berry	Brer Hoodoo	Joe R. Lansdale	Tim Truman
			The Story of a Nut Gone Bad...	Roger Langridge	Roger Langridge
			The Shaft	Brian Azzarello	Javier Pulido
14	September 2000	Michael Kaluta	Resolve	Bruce Jones	Berni Wrightson
			Grave Wisdom	Ted McKeever	Ted McKeever
			If Wishes Had Wings	Darko Macan	Tim Levins
15	November 2000	Dean Ormston	A Night To Forget	Paul Jenkins	The Pander Bros
			Watchful	Lucius Shepard	Chris Weston
			The Future's so Bright	Will Pfeifer	Robert Valley
16	January 2001	Richard Corben	The Wedding Breakfast	Mike Carey	Craig Hamilton
			A Temporary Life	Charlie Boatner	Philip Bond
			DESCENT	Guy Gonzalez	Danijel Žeželj

== Awards ==
Issue #11 won a Horror Writers' Association Bram Stoker Award for "Red Romance" by Joe R. Lansdale. Issue #11 also received a nomination for a 2001 Will Eisner Comic Industry award for best cover artist (Phil Hale).
