= Masking (comics) =

Visual style used in comics

American cartoonist Scott McCloud argues that readers are more likely to identify with a simply-drawn "iconic" character than with a realistic-looking one.

Masking (or the masking effect) is a visual style used in comics, first described by American cartoonist Scott McCloud in his book Understanding Comics: The Invisible Art. McCloud argues that characters with simple but recognizable designs, which he terms "iconic" characters, allow readers to project themselves into the story by using the characters as a "mask". He further argues that the juxtaposition of iconic characters with detailed backgrounds, characters, or objects can create meaning and strengthen or weaken readers' emotional and psychological connection to certain elements of the graphic narrative.

Masking can be found in various media outside of comics, such as animation, picture books and video games (especially visual novels). Masking is commonly used in manga and anime; McCloud states that masking "was, for a time, virtually a national style" in Japan.

== Types ==
McCloud identifies three types of masking:

1. Iconic characters placed in realistically detailed backgrounds
2. Iconic characters juxtaposed alongside realistically detailed characters
3. Simply-drawn objects which are suddenly shown in realistic detail

McCloud proposes that readers can use iconic characters as a "mask" to enter the detailed worlds of graphic narratives. He argues that readers often look towards facial features – in particular the eyes and mouth – for indications of emotion, and the absence of such details in the simply-drawn faces of iconic characters create room for readers to project their own emotions onto. The placement of an iconic character in a realistically detailed background amplifies this reader-to-text connection, as it emphasizes the otherness of the setting and the status of the character as an "empty canvas".

Characters may be drawn simplistically or in great detail to encourage identification or objectification by the reader. In shōnen (boy's) manga and anime, an antagonist may be depicted in a realistic style to convey the character's otherness from a simply-drawn protagonist. Meanwhile, in shōjo (girl's) manga and anime, characters may be "minimally differentiated" from each other to encourage reader identification with the entire cast of characters.

Another common practice in manga and anime is that a simply-drawn object, often a prop used by a character, may suddenly be shown in realistic detail to emphasize its status as an object. When a prop is drawn in a simplistic manner similar to the character using it, it can be viewed as an extension of the character. The reader, however, becomes aware of the prop as an object when it is shown in realistic detail, as the reader considers the prop's hypothetical real-world elements, such as its "weight, texture and physical complexity".

== Examples ==
=== In Western comics ===
Hergé's "clear-line" style juxtaposes simply-drawn characters with realistically detailed backgrounds. (Note: Example from Prisoners of the Sun, the fourteenth volume of The Adventures of Tintin by Hergé.)

Masking, in particular the placement of iconic characters in realistically detailed backgrounds, is featured prominently in Hergé's The Adventures of Tintin comics. The "clear-line" style of Hergé, which blends abstractions with realism, encourages readers to mask themselves as the oblique Tintin while traversing the detailed environments featured in each panel.

Nancy Rose Hunt, an American historian specializing in African studies, questions this interpretation of the clear-line style, arguing that non-white audiences may have trouble identifying with the all-white main cast, especially when non-white characters are portrayed as racist caricatures alongside the protagonists. Hunt gives the example of a Congolese reader who may find it difficult to mask themselves as Tintin, a character explicitly stated to be from Belgium, the Congo's historical colonizer. Said reader may also be unable to mask themselves as one of the many Congolese characters featured in the comics, as the Congolese characters' iconic designs are, in Hunt's view, akin to racist portrayals of black people in minstrel shows.

=== In manga ===
The protagonist Saitama (right) is drawn more simply than the antagonist Vaccine Man (left). (Note: Example from the first volume of One-Punch Man by ONE and Yusuke Murata.)

Masking can be seen in the superhero manga series One-Punch Man by ONE and Yusuke Murata. The titular protagonist Saitama is usually drawn in a simplistic manner with an iconic face, while the series' other characters often have intricate costume or facial designs. Consequently, Saitama is often juxtaposed alongside characters with realistically detailed appearances, which creates a masking effect where readers identify with the iconic Saitama and objectify the other characters.

Examples of masking can be found in the first chapter of One-Punch Man, when Saitama introduces himself to the monstrous villain Vaccine Man and the reader. Saitama is intentionally drawn with minimal detail; shading is present but not as pronounced around the creases of his costume as it is around the outlines of Vaccine Man's muscular body. Vaccine Man's facial features are also much more detailed than Saitama's, as Saitama's face consists of simple lines and shapes, while Vaccine Man's facial design features bulging veins, constricted pupils, and a pronounced nose, lips and ears. The background behind Saitama is also drawn in great detail, with each dent and protrusion in the debris being carefully shaded. Two types of masking are therefore at play: Saitama is an iconic character placed next to a realistically detailed character and in a realistically detailed background to emphasize the otherness of the graphical elements around him, as well as Saitama's status as a maskable character which readers can project themselves onto.

== Reception and analysis ==
McCloud's concept of masking has been widely cited in formal comics studies and analyses of media other than comics. For example, Australian political cartoonist Sam Wallman similarly regards the simple, minimal features of characters in children's books as making them "vessels" that the reader can more easily project themselves onto. In contrast, critics of McCloud have questioned the universality of masking as a concept, arguing that "simplicity" is subjective and the parameters surrounding what is simple and what is complex vary between cultures. Critics further contend that readers may create an emotional connection with the story from narrative elements other than characters' visual presentations, such as the characters' personalities and the story's plot.

Composition specialists Christiane Buuck and Cathy Ryan expand upon McCloud's ideas but contradict some of his assumptions by arguing that the projection caused by masking can occur even when delineated characters are placed in simply-drawn backgrounds (as opposed to simply-drawn characters in delineated backgrounds). Buuck and Ryan use the example of Shaun Tan's The Arrival, in which human characters are drawn in photorealistic detail, while non-human characters and background environments are given simplistic but fantastical designs. Buuck and Ryan propose that, while the intricately designed human characters in the story cannot serve as "vessels" for readers to mask themselves as, they can serve as "guides" for the reader as they navigate an "unfamiliar" setting. In other words, Buuck and Ryan argue that when delineated characters are juxtaposed with simple or unrealistic backgrounds, readers may imagine themselves as being inside the story alongside the characters rather than masking themselves as them.

== See also ==
- Glossary of comics terminology
- Manga iconography
- Uncanny valley
