= Superman Adventures =

Comic book series by DC Comics

- Cover of Superman: Adventures of the Man of Steel trade paperback from 1998. Art by Bruce Timm and Alex Ross.

Publication information
- Publisher: DC Comics
- Schedule: Monthly
- Format: Standard
- Genre: Superhero
- Publication date: 1996—2002
- No. of issues: 66
- Main character: Superman

Creative team
- Written by: Paul Dini, Mark Evanier, Devin Grayson, Scott McCloud, Mark Millar, Ty Templeton
- Penciller(s): Rick Burchett, Neil Vokes, Aluir Amancio
- Inker: Terry Austin

Superman Adventures is a DC Comics comic book series featuring Superman. It is set in the continuity (and style) of Superman: The Animated Series. It ran for 66 issues between 1996 and 2002. Writers on the series included Paul Dini, Mark Evanier, Devin Grayson, Scott McCloud, Mark Millar, and Ty Templeton. It is a sister title to The Batman Adventures (based on Batman: The Animated Series) and Justice League Adventures (based on Justice League).

== Exclusive characters ==
While the comic relied mostly on the cast from the animated series, there were a few characters who only appeared in the comic, such as General Zod, Brad Wilson (from Superman III), Bizarro Lois Lane, Krypto, and Sandman (from "The Sandman Saga").

== One shots ==
=== World's Finest ===
Batman and Superman Adventures: World's Finest (December 1997) is an adaptation of the 3-part episode of the same name. The adaptation is mostly faithful to the animated version. An additional scene shows Batman discussing with Alfred his problem with Superman (his tendency to rush in without thinking). The story was written by Paul Dini, with penciling by Joe Staton, and inks by Terry Beatty.

=== Superman vs Lobo ===
In Superman Adventures Special: Superman vs Lobo: Misery in Space (February 1998), Superman inhales a poison unleashed by some terrorists and leaves Earth to trace a radiation source that should cure him (though not lethal to Superman, the poison makes him a danger to the rest of Earth). Lobo is pointed to an artifact called the Nirvana Crystal, which emits the radiation source Superman requires. The two team up (not with the best of results) and head to the Maracot System.

The owner of the crystal, Squeed, is determined to launch it into the sun to cleanse the universe of evil (as his wife was killed in an accident, but he assumes it to be an evil act). Superman, much to Lobo's dismay, has to destroy the crystal to keep it from going into the sun. The energy from the destruction of the crystal results in Superman's ailment being cured. He leaves to go back to Earth before the council of Maracot can repay him and Lobo with their treasury. Lobo claims he will give Superman his share of the reward and the issue ends with him asking, "Would I lie?" The story was written by David Michelinie, with art by John Delaney and Mike Manley.

== Reprints ==
=== English version by DC Comics ===
Title	Material collected	Publication date	ISBN
Batman & Superman Adventures: World's Finest	Adaptation of Superman: The Animated Series episode 'World's Finest' trilogy.	1997-01-01?	1-56389-386-X/978-1-56389-386-5
Superman: Adventures of the Man of Steel	Superman Adventures #1-6	2000-10-04	978-1-56389-429-9
Superman Adventures (Digest size)
Superman Adventures: Up, Up and Away!	Superman Adventures #16, 19, 22-24	2004-08-11	978-1-4012-0331-3
Superman Adventures: The Never-Ending Battle	Superman Adventures #25-29	2004-08-11	978-1-4012-0332-0
Superman Adventures: Last Son of Krypton	Superman Adventures #30-34	2006-01-25	978-1-4012-1037-3
Superman Adventures: The Man of Steel	Superman Adventures #35-39	2006-02-08	1-4012-1038-4/978-1-4012-1038-0
Superman Adventures (new editions)
Superman Adventures: The Man of Steel	Superman Adventures #17, 18, 40 and 41 (missing The Pest From the Fifth Dimension, Sign Here, Ninety Days Later, The Toyman's Christmas List, Another Ninety Days Later, Blackout, Yet Another Ninety Days Later); Superman/Batman Magazine #1 (The Origin of Superman), 3 (Superman vs. The Mechanical Monsters), 5 (All Mx'd up), 7 (The Doomsday Solution)	2013-10-30	?
Superman Adventures Volume 1	Superman Adventures #1–10	2015-11-11	978-1-4012-5867-2
Superman Adventures Volume 2	Superman Adventures #11–16, Annual #1, Special #1	2016-05-25	978-1-4012-6094-1
Superman Adventures Volume 3	Superman Adventures #17-25	2017-05-24	978-1-4012-7242-5
Superman Adventures Volume 4	Superman Adventures #26-35	2017-12-27	1-4012-7511-7/978-1-4012-7511-2
Superman by Mark Millar	Team Superman (July 1999) #1, Tangent Comics: The Superman #1, From Krypton With Love from Superman 80-Page Giant (1999) #2, System's Finest from DC One Million 80-page Giant #1,000,000, Superman Adventures #19, 25-27, 30-31, 36, 52	2018-05-30	1-4012-7874-4/978-1-4012-7874-8
Superman Adventures: Lex Luthor, Man of Metropolis	Superman Adventures #27, 54, 55, 65, 66	2021-02-24	1-77950-812-3/978-1-77950-812-6
Supergirl Adventures: Girl of Steel	Superman Adventures #21+39, Justice League Unlimited #7+16 (Note: Publisher mislisted the book includes Superman Adventures #52, but the actual issue is Justice League Unlimited #16.)	2021-08-03	1-77951-025-X/978-1-77951-025-9/EAN-5 50999
DC Comics: Girls Unite!/DC Girls Unite	Batman Adventures: Cat Got Your Tongue?, Supergirl Adventures: Girl of Steel, Batman Adventures: Batgirl A League of Her Own, Justice League Unlimited: Girl Power	2021-11-02	978-1-77951-362-5/EAN-5 53999

=== English/Spanish version by Berlitz Publishing ===
The Learn Spanish with Superman series includes relettered speech bubbles, with over 300 Spanish words and phrases in red replacing the original text. Outside the comic panels frame, the replaced Spanish and the corresponding English texts are printed at the page border, but the English texts do not necessarily match the ones in original publications. The Aprende Ingles Con Superman versions are in English text.

Title	Material collected	Publication date	ISBN
Learn Spanish with Superman: Up, Up and Away!/Learn Spanish with Superman Volume 1	Superman Adventures #16, 19, 22-24	2007-11-15	981-268-179-5/978-981-268-179-9
Learn Spanish with Superman: The Never-Ending Battle/Learn Spanish with Superman Volume 2	Superman Adventures #25-29	2007-11-15	981-268-180-9/978-981-268-180-5
Title	Material collected	Publication date	ISBN
Aprende Ingles Con Superman: Arriba, Arriba y Fuera!	Superman Adventures #16, 19, 22-24	2007-?-?	981-268-201-5/978-981-268-201-7

=== French version by Urban Comics ===
Title	Material collected	Publication date	ISBN
Superman Aventures Volume 1	Superman Adventures #1–10	2016-03-25	979-10-268-1426-9
Superman Aventures Volume 2	Superman Adventures #11–20	2016-11-10	979-10-268-1426-9
Superman Aventures Volume 3	Superman Adventures #?	2018-06-29	979-10-268-1407-8
Superman Aventures Volume 4	Superman Adventures #26-35	2018-12-07	979-10-268-1426-9
Superman Aventures Volume 5	Superman Adventures #36-45	2020-06-05	979-10-268-1762-8
Superman Aventures Volume 6	Superman Adventures #46-55	2022-12-09	979-10-268-2651-4

=== Indonesian version by PT Gramedia Majalah ===
Title	Material collected	Publication date	ISBN
Superman Adventures 01: The Man of Steel	Superman Adventures #?	2002-01-01?	?
Superman Adventures 02	Superman Adventures #30-39?	2002-01-01?	?
Superman Adventures 03	Superman Adventures #?	2002-01-01?	?
Superman Adventures 04	Superman Adventures #35-39? (Indonesian version Superman Adventures: The Man of Steel (2006))	2002-01-01?	?
Superman Adventures 05	Superman Adventures #?	2002-01-01?	?
Superman Adventures 06	Superman Adventures #?	2002-01-01?	?
Superman Adventures 07	Superman Adventures #?	2002-01-01?	?
Superman Adventures 08	Superman Adventures #?	2002-01-01?	?
Superman Adventures 09	Superman Adventures #?	2003-01-01?	?
Superman Adventures 10	Superman Adventures #?	2003-01-01?	?

=== Spanish version by Grupo Editorial Vid ===
Title	Material collected	Publication date	ISBN
Batman & Superman Aventuras: Héroes Mundiales	Adaptation of Superman: The Animated Series episode 'World's Finest' trilogy.	1998-02-02	

== See also ==
- List of DC Comics publications
- The Batman Adventures
- Adventures in the DC Universe/Justice League Adventures/Justice League Unlimited
