= Patrick Farley =

Freelance illustrator

Patrick Sean Farley
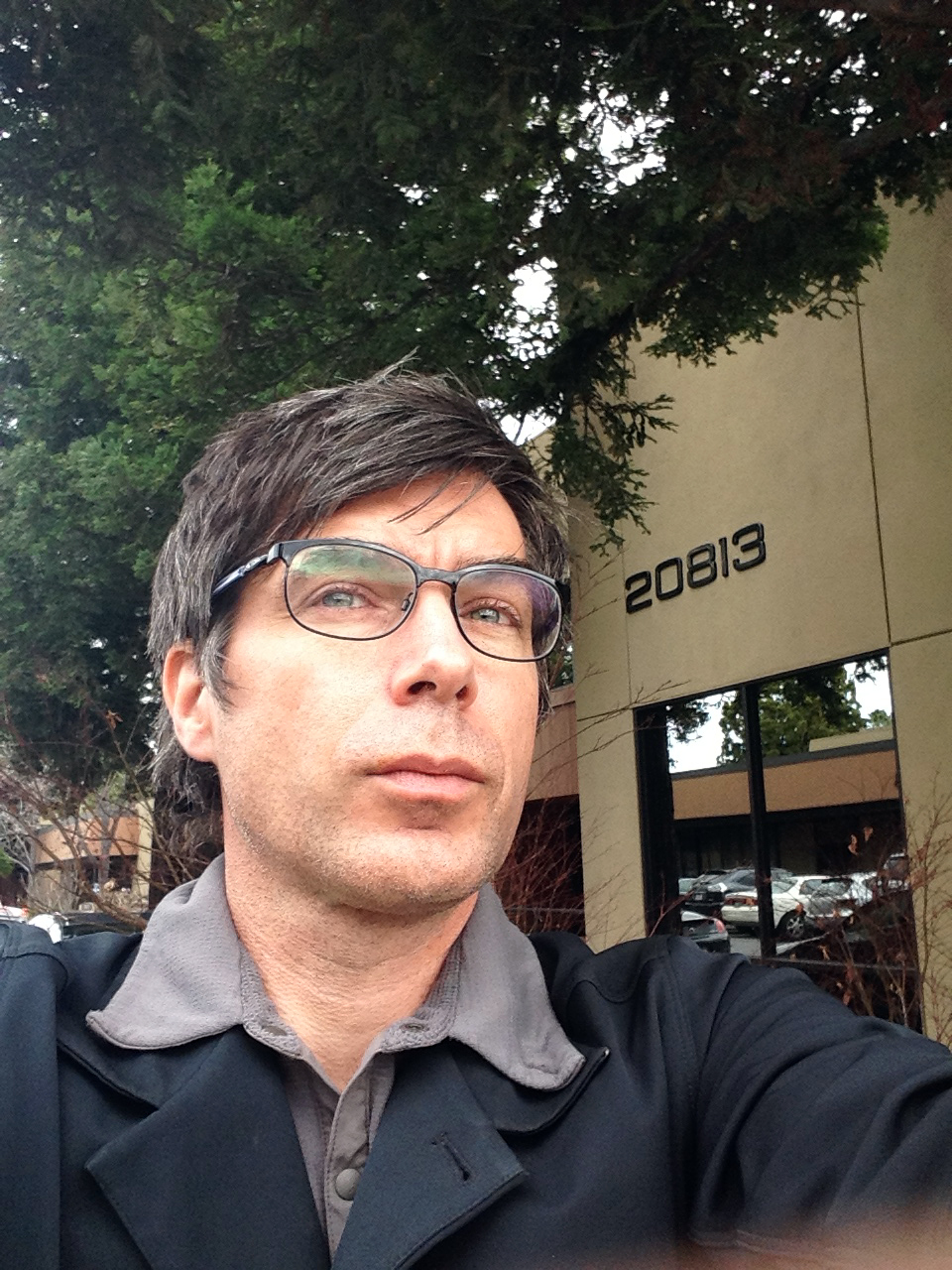
- Patrick Farley in Cupertino, CA 2013
- Website: LiveJournal site

Patrick Sean Farley is a freelance illustrator and Web page designer. Known as a pioneer of webcomics as a medium, Farley works out of Oakland, California.

== Biography ==
Patrick Farley is the creator of comics under the anthology "Electric Sheep Comix". Scott McCloud cites him as an early pioneer of the webcomics movement. He is the author of a semi-autobiographical webcomics graphic novel The Guy I Almost Was and of several other Web-based comics or stories, listed below.

In addition to the traditional strip format Farley has presented work in the infinite canvas mode peculiar to the more innovative web comics, and he has done many stories using 3D tools such as Poser and Bryce.

The Webcomics Examiner wrote a story about Farley's work in December 2004 titled "Patrick Farley, Apocalyptic Utopian", describing him as "the Cecil B. DeMille of webcomics".

Farley appeared in Adventures Into Digital Comics, a 2006 documentary on the comics industry.

=== Electric Sheep Comix ===
Electric Sheep Comix is a Web-based anthology of Farley's work. The name was taken from the title of Philip K. Dick's novel "Do Androids Dream of Electric Sheep?". It was originally hosted at the domain e-sheep.com, but the domain registration lapsed, and after being offline for 2 years, the site was restarted in August 2009, at a new domain.

One unusual project from this collection is Apocamon: The Final Judgement, a satirical, stylized presentation of the Book of Revelation in a graphic style similar to the Pokémon trading card game and a writing style similar to the comic book tracts of Jack T. Chick.

=== The Spiders ===
The Spiders is a webcomic written and illustrated by cartoonist Patrick S. Farley for his website, Electric Sheep Comix. The comic traces an alternate history of the U.S. invasion of Afghanistan, where Al Gore is President of the United States, and ordinary civilians can view the war through web cams carried by roving robotic "spiders" dispersed into Afghanistan by the U.S. Army.

Unlike most webcomics, the comic is displayed in an "infinite canvas" format, where each page of the comic has the individual panels lined up in one continuous strip, viewable in full by scrolling with the horizontal scrollbar of the reader's web browser. Occasionally, the pages of the comic deviate from the format for storytelling effect, usually in the form of a fictional web page created for the story.

Mark Frauenfelder, writing for Playboy, recommended the comic, praising how it used the multimedia capabilities afforded by the internet to "present comics in an entirely new way."

=== Electric Sheep Reloaded ===
In March 2010 Farley started a Kickstarter page in order to raise $6,000 to support him in making more comics for his website. On May 1, 2010, the fund raiser was successful. From June 2010 until December 2010 Farley continued The Spiders with a chapter titled Prologue.
