= When I Am King =

Webcomic by demian5

- Author: demian5
- Website: https://www.level32.net/d5index
- Launch date: 2001
- Genre: Infinite canvas

When I Am King is a wordless infinite canvas webcomic by Swiss artist demian5 about an Egyptian king's travels through a desert. It has a characteristic design that makes heavy use of oranges and reds, uses arrows to emphasize horizontal movement, and has occasional GIF animation.

== Plot ==
The king of Egypt wakes up, dresses himself in a royal towel and goes for a stroll, but a camel eats his towel. The naked king then returns to the palace but is stopped at the entrance by his two palace guards who don't recognize him, and he leaves when they throw away his crown. As the naked king is mocked by two women and a group of children, the camel has fallen in love with the king and chases after him. The king eventually makes his way to a shop, but he does not have enough money to buy underwear and buys a cigarette instead. After a brief fight with the group of children, the camel rescues the king by eating one of them. Meanwhile, the two women have a threesome with one of the guards in a giant flowerbed.

Darkness falls as the camel carries the unconscious king to safety, where they make peace. After some cactus-induced hallucinations visualized with 3D computer graphics, the king retrieves his crown. The characters all go to sleep and dream about the events of the day. The next morning, the king retrieves the contents of the camel's intestines, including his royal towel, and goes back to his palace, where he takes a flower from the guard standing duty. The guard and camel then get together. The two women try to have a second threesome with the same guard as before, but are killed by giant bees while in the flowerbed.

Chapter One, Episode Three – The King meets The Camel.

== Reception ==
When I Am King has been described by Wired magazine as "the amusing, sometimes otherworldly story of an Egyptian royal who ventures out into a bizarre world". The Comics Journal writes that it "treats the underground staples of sex, low humor, and drug experiences with wit and artistic virtuosity. ... Demian 5's work seems to be influenced by the graphics of rave cards and the culture of techno music. ... The story scrolls like an electronic codex, moving horizontally across a minimalist landscape for much of the narrative and is peppered with animation throughout. ... The story's climax in Chapter 4 is an experimental tour de force that begins the falling action with a descending scroll and includes some outstanding 3-D rendering and animation."

The work has been featured as one of The Independent's "10 Best Sites of the Week" and in Salon's "No laughing matter" about the relationship between traditional comics and webcomics. In 2002, When I Am King was nominated for 2 Web Cartoonists' Choice Awards – Best Infinite Canvas Comic and Best Use of the Digital Medium – winning the latter. Scott McCloud gives demian5 as an example of a "native digital artist [who has] pushed the limits of vector stylization and other forms of digital art."

Demian5's other comic, Square Fiction, has been published in the Zurich Express newspaper as well as on the subscription webcomics site Serializer.
