= The Sculptor =

The Sculptor may refer to:

- The Sculptor (film), an Australian film
- The Sculptor (comics), a 2015 graphic novel by Scott McCloud
