= J. Torres =

Canadian comic book writer

- Born: Joseph Torres; 1969 (age 56–57) Manila, Philippines
- Area: Writer

Joseph Torres, better known as J. Torres (born 1969), is a Filipino-born Canadian comic book writer. He is known for his run on DC Comics' Teen Titans Go! as well as his two Forest of Reading Honour Books, the graphic novels Planet Hockey (2021) and Stealing Home (2022). He has also done some writing for animation and television, most notably Degrassi: The Next Generation.

== Early life ==
Torres was born in Manila and raised in Montreal, Quebec where he was educated at McGill University. Before writing comic books, Torres was an ESL instructor. He is married, has two children, and currently resides in Toronto, Ontario.

== Career ==
=== Comics ===
Torres debuted with the semi-autobiographical Copybook Tales, first published by Slave Labor Graphics in the early 90s and then later collected and reprinted by Oni Press. He next wrote Siren, a three-part miniseries published by Image Comics. Both titles were co-created with artist Tim Levins whom Torres had first met in high school.

In 2002, Oni published Alison Dare, co-created by J. Bone, the first of a number of critically acclaimed all-ages titles for both the writer and publisher. Sidekicks with Takeshi Miyazawa came next, followed by Jason and the Argobots with Mike Norton, and Days Like This with Scott Chantler.

Following a short time at Marvel, working titles such as Black Panther, X-Men: Ronin, and X-Men Unlimited, Torres wrote the Teen Titans tie-in comic Teen Titans Go!. He also wrote for several other children-focused comics, including The Batman Strikes!, Legion of Super Heroes in the 31st Century, and the creator-owned Family Dynamic.

During this time, Torres also contributed to more mature titles, such as Batman: Legends of the Dark Knight, Blue Beetle, Ninja Scroll, Wonder Girl, and Wonder Woman.

His subsequent credits include Batman: The Brave and the Bold for DC, WALL-E for Boom Studios, and Power Lunch for Oni Press.

He also wrote for and helped edit the Yo Gabba Gabba: Comic Book Time anthology for Oni and the True Patriot Canadian superhero anthology.

Torres wrote the Rick and Morty comic Rick and Morty Presents: The Vindicators (2018), published by Oni Press with art by CJ Cannon.

=== Other media ===
In 2006, Torres penned the Degrassi: Extra Credit series of graphic novels from Simon & Schuster as well as contributed writing to the Degrassi: The Next Generation animated and live action webisodes (a.k.a. Degrassi Minis). Although the Extra Credit series underperformed, despite being the first graphic novel advertised on Canadian network television, they helped increase Torres' profile especially in the book industry.

Torres has also written chapter books and activity books for Scholastic and Simon Says, short stories and comic strips for magazines including Kayak, YTV's Whoa, and Nickelodeon Magazine (to which he contributed Avatar: The Last Airbender comics). He was also a staff writer on the Rugrats daily syndicated newspaper comic strip.

His animation credits include Oh No! It's An Alien Invasion, Hi Hi Puffy Ami Yumi, Edgar & Ellen, League of Super Evil, and Adventure Comics for the DC Kids YouTube channel.

== Awards ==
The comics Torres has worked on have earned nominations for the prestigious Eisner Award (Alison Dare), "Best Title for Younger Readers" (2003), Harvey Award (Sidekicks, 2001), and Shuster Award for which he has been nominated six times. He won the Shuster for "Outstanding Canadian Writer" in 2006 for his work on Batman: Legends of the Dark Knight, Love as a Foreign Language, and Teen Titans Go. His graphic novels Days Like This and Lola: A Ghost Story were also listed by YALSA in 2004 and 2010 respectively. “Bigfoot Boy: Into the Woods" was a 2012 Junior Library Guild selection and also named one of Kirkus Reviews' Best Children's Books 2012.

Other awards:

Bigfoot Boy: The Sound of Thunder, 2014 Shuster Award Nominee

Brobots and the Kaiju Kerfuffle, 2016 Parents' Choice Award

Brobots and the Mecha Malarkey, 2018 Shuster Award Nominee

Planet Hockey: First Star of the Game, 2021 Forest of Reading Silver Birch Express Honour Book

Stealing Home, 2021 ALA Best Graphic Novels for Children, 2022 Forest of Reading Silver Birch Express Honour Book, 2023 Hackmatack Reader's Choice Book Award

== Bibliography ==
=== Archie Comics ===
- Archie #640
- Archie & Friends #153
- Life with Archie #7-8, 10

=== Boom Studios ===
- Wall-E #0-2

=== Dark Horse Comics ===
- Free Comic Book Day 2011: Avatar – The Last Airbender / Star Wars – The Clone Wars #1

=== DC Comics ===
- The Batman Strikes! #16, 23, 29, 34
- Batman: Knightwatch #1-5
- Batman: Legends of the Dark Knight #190-191
- Batman: The Brave and the Bold #5-8, 11, 22
- The Black Canary Wedding Planner #1
- Blue Beetle #15
- DC Universe Holiday Special '09 #1
- Hi Hi Puffy Amiyumi #2-3
- Legion of Super Heroes in the 31st Century #1–2, 5–6, 11, 13 and 17–19
- Teen Titans Go! Digest (with Todd Nauck, DC Comics):
  - Vol. 1: Truth, Justice, Pizza (ISBN 1-4012-0333-7)
  - Vol. 2: Heroes on Patrol (ISBN 1-4012-0334-5)
  - Vol. 3: Bring It On (ISBN 1-4012-0511-9)
  - Vol. 4: Ready for Action (ISBN 1-4012-0985-8)
  - Vol. 5: On the Move (ISBN 1-4012-0986-6)
  - Vol. 6: Titans Together (ISBN 1-4012-1563-7) (Trade Paperback, but continued the issue numbering)
- Ninja Scroll, Wildstorm, 2006=2007, tpb, July 2007)
- Wonder Girl #1-6
- Wonder Woman #11-13

=== Marvel Comics ===
- Black Panther #57-58
- X-Men: Ronin (Marvel Mangaverse) (with Makoto Nakatsuka, Marvel Comics, ISBN 0-7851-1115-8)
- X-Men Unlimited (by Various, Marvel Comics, ISBN 0-7851-1350-9)

=== Oni Press ===
- Brobots (with Sean Dove, Oni Press)
  - Vol 1: ...and the Kajiu Kerfuffle! (ISBN 1-620103-06-0)
  - Vol 2: ...and the Mecha Marlarkey! (ISBN 1-620104-24-5)
- The Copybook Tales (with Tim Levins, Oni Press, ISBN 1-929998-39-2)
- Days Like This (with Scott Chantler, Oni Press, ISBN 1-929998-48-1)
- Jason and the Argobots (with Mike Norton, Oni Press):
  - Vol. 1: Birthquake (ISBN 1-929998-55-4)
  - Vol. 2: Machina Ex Deus (ISBN 1-929998-56-2)
- Love As A Foreign Language Omnibus 1 (ISBN 1-932664-41-6)
- Scandalous (with Scott Chantler, Oni Press, ISBN 1-929998-98-8)
- Sidekicks: The Transfer Student (with Takeshi Miyazawa, Oni Press, ISBN 1-929998-40-6)
- Rick and Morty Presents: The Vindicators (2018)

== Notes ==
Preceded by Jodi Picoult	Wonder Woman writer 2007	Succeeded by Gail Simone
