= Scott Peterson (comics) =

American editor at WildStorm Productions, an imprint of DC Comics

- Born: December 9, 1968 (age 57)
- Areas: Writer, Editor
- Notable works: Batman: Gotham Adventures

Scott James Peterson (born December 9, 1968) is an American editor at WildStorm Productions, an imprint of DC Comics, and a writer of comic books and children's books.

== Career ==
Peterson joined the staff of DC Comics as the assistant of Dennis O'Neil in 1991. He worked as an editor of Batman-related titles from 1991 to 1998 and spent eight years as a freelance writer of comic books and children's books before returning to the editor's desk at WildStorm in July, 2006.

During his years at DC Comics, Peterson edited such titles as Detective Comics, Green Arrow, Batman: Black & White, Nightwing, and The Batman Adventures, including the Eisner and Harvey Award-winning Mad Love by Paul Dini and Bruce Timm. Along with Dennis O'Neil, Jordan Gorfinkel, and Darren Vincenzo, Peterson was part of the Batman editorial team that developed the No Man's Land storyline conceived by Jordan B. Gorfinkel in 1998.

Between 1999 and 2003 he wrote 42 issues of Batman: Gotham Adventures, a monthly comic book aimed at young readers, pencilled by Canadian artist Tim Levins. In 2000, Peterson was the co-writer, along with Kelley Puckett, of DC's first ongoing Batgirl comic book series.

== Bibliography ==
=== Books ===
- Scholastic Reader Level 3: Batman #8: The Story of Batman (Scholastic, 2006)
- Disney Classic Cartoon Tales (Disney Press, 2005)
- Disney Out of This World Cartoon Tales (Disney Press, 2005)
- Disney Splashtacular Cartoon Tales (Disney Press, 2006)
- Disney Royally Enchanted Cartoon Tales (Disney Press, 2006)
- "Disney Phineas and Ferb: Guide To Life" (Disney Press, 2011)

=== Comics ===
- Showcase '94 #12 Oracle, pencilled by Brian Stelfreeze (DC Comics, 1994)
- Underworld Unleashed: Abyss-Hell's Sentinel, pencilled by Phil Jimenez (DC Comics, 1995)
- Batman: Gotham Adventures #15-30, 32, 34–50, 52–57, 59–60, pencilled by Tim Levins (DC Comics, 1999–2003)
- Batman: Kings of Fear #1-6, art by Kelley Jones (DC Comics, 2018–2019)
- Batgirl: Vol. 1: "Silent Running" (DC Comics, 2000)
- Scooby-Doo #109, 111, 118, 136-137 (DC Comics, 2006–2008)

=== Graphic novels ===
- Truckus Maximus (First Second, 2019), with José García

=== Video games ===
Story and cutscenes.

- Batman: Dark Tomorrow (GameCube and Xbox)
- Superman: The Man of Steel (Xbox)

== Awards ==
- 1997 Will Eisner Comic Industry Awards Won - Best Anthology for Batman: Black and White; - Nominee - Best Editor for Batman: Black and White (DC Comics)
