= Kurt Huang =

American businessman

Kurt Huang is co-founder, president, and chief product officer of BitPass. He has a computer science degree from Harvard and an MD from Stanford.

Named to the 2004 list of the world's 100 Top Young Innovators by MIT's Technology Review magazine.

He was born in Chicago, Illinois to immigrants from Taiwan.
