= The Sculptor (comics) =

2015 graphic novel by Scott McCloud

- Creator: Scott McCloud
- Date: February 3, 2015
- Page count: 496 pages
- Publisher: First Second Books

The Sculptor is a graphic novel by American cartoonist Scott McCloud published in 2015. It tells of a David Smith whom Death gives 200 days to live in exchange for the power to sculpt anything he can imagine. Complications set in when David falls in love.

== Plot summary ==
26-year-old New York-based artist David Smith is dealing with a difficult life—his family is dead, his patron has abandoned him, and he is broke—when Death greets him in the guise of his dead great-uncle Harry. Death offers David the power to sculpt anything he wishes, at the cost of having only 200 days to live. After David accepts, Death tells him he will receive his wish at sunrise. Following their meeting, David is surrounded by a crowd of strangers, including a woman with angel wings who tells him "everything will be alright".

At a later meet-up at his friend Ollie's art gallery, David meets Penelope Hammer, an elder board director who is eager to help him, and Finn Tanaka, a privileged artist and Ollie's boyfriend. Ollie takes David after to a party in an attempt to get him to make friends, and during the party David overhears Finn bragging about exploiting Ollie. He also discovers the crowd of strangers from earlier in the day, who are also now at the party, was a flash mob filming him for a viral video. David is angered that they tricked him, but the woman who played the angel, named Meg, apologizes and comforts him. David wanders back home, and on a bridge at sunrise discovers he's gained the power to reshape any material with his hands.

Six weeks later, David has created dozens of sculptures in his apartment for a massive showing. Ollie invites several guests, including art critics, but his sculptures receive poor reviews. Later that night his landlord kicks him out after a sculpture breaks through the floor, and David is left without money again. He wanders homeless for days until attempting to commit suicide, but is discovered by Meg and brought to her apartment. David is allowed to stay with her and her roommates until he gets enough money to return home. Getting in contact with Ollie, he learns of an opening at the gallery and prepares a new set of sculptures to compete for the spot, while also growing closer to Meg.

After she and her boyfriend separate, David and Meg begin dating, despite Death-as-Harry's warning that David's impending death could affect her badly. After Hanukkah passes, David learns that he didn't get the gallery spot but Ollie's boyfriend Finn did. Accusing Ollie of nepotism, he breaks off their friendship and grows frustrated due having only four months left to live. Shortly thereafter, though, Meg falls into depression and David learns from her roommates that she is frequently afflicted by it. David resolves to stay and provide her emotional support, but it takes three weeks for her to recover, during which a frustrated David vandalizes Finn's sculpture with his powers.

Meg's cheer returns as the new year starts, reviving her and David's relationship. Shortly after they first sleep together, David gets an epiphany to stop focusing on getting his art shown at galleries. Instead he starts sneaking out at night and creating sculptures all throughout New York City, an activity that causes him anonymous fame but also turns him into a fugitive from the police. Three months pass with him creating more sculptures but becoming more and more wanted, as well as his secrecy causing strain in his relationship to Meg. After an argument over another homeless man Meg has sheltered, she and David separate; temporarily she thinks, but in actuality David intends to die during their hiatus in hopes that it'll be easier on her. With only 23 days to live, David moves to a new apartment and attempts to create new sculptures, but a week passes with him unsuccessfully trying to forget Meg.

Unexpectedly, Meg visits him and reveals that she is pregnant, intending to raise the child and curious if he will join her. David is moved by guilt and tells her about his pact with Death, though doing so causes him to lose three days of his life. With only twelve days left, he and Meg resolve to spend them together. Another week passes with them breaking old promises, having dates, and creating more secret sculptures. On four days left, Ollie returns to see David and apologize, and also directs him to Penelope Hammer. Meeting her again, David discovers that her proxy Mr. Harris had attended his old apartment's art showing and had been searching for him for the past five months to buy his sculptures and create an art event.

On three days left, David introduces Meg to Death, and he and "Harry" have one last private meeting. However, Death reveals their meet-up was actually to distract David to Meg's imminent death that day. As David tries to reach Meg before it happens, the police storm his room and he fights them off using his powers. He arrives at Meg's location too late to save her from being hit by a truck, and descends with her body to the subway tunnels to mourn her. Death's guise as Harry begins to crumble, but before he disappears he tells David to not lose heart and commit suicide like his uncle did after his wife died.

That night, David storms a construction site to build one last sculpture. The workers evacuate and the police surround him, but David refuses to surrender and continues building the entire night. As he completes his sculpture by the morning, a police sniper shoots him and he falls stories to the ground, during which his life flashes before his eyes. David is killed on impact, and the sculpture turns out to be an enormous statue of Meg and their unborn child.

== Characters ==
=== Main characters ===
- David Smith: A 26-year-old financially struggling sculptor. David is gloomy, obsessive, and struggles with connecting to other people. Due to a strict sense of honor, he tends to make promises from not taking charity to even refusing to enter specific stores. He is the last living member of his family. Due to his name, people occasionally refer to him as "the other David Smith."
- Meg: A Jewish occasional actress and bicycle courier who sometimes shelters the homeless. Meg is usually lively and empathic, but has depression that can last for weeks perpetually. While seeking to be "more than an object" to people, Meg is sometimes self-conscious about pursuing acting as a career.
- Death / Uncle Harry: The personification of death in the form of David's great-uncle. Death is permitted to live as a mortal on Earth every few thousand years, and is in the guise of Harry as long as there is living family that the man once knew. He is friendly to David and offers him advice, but is restricted from preventing death or bringing the dead back to life due to rules even he cannot break.
- Ollie: An assistant at a local art gallery and David's best friend since childhood. Ostracized by his parents after he came out as gay, Ollie was practically an adopted son to David's family. He is sympathetic to David's work, but the two clash at times over the subjective value of art. Despite his appreciation for art, though, Ollie is willing to snub promising candidates from the gallery to accept ones that will benefit him. Due to this he continues to date Finn Tanaka, despite knowing the artist is using him and so reneges to using him back.

=== Supporting characters ===
- David's family: Deceased before the story opens. David's father was a science-fiction author, but his work tended to not sell well before his death in a plane accident. David's mother died of cancer when her son and daughter were college age. His sister Suzy was sickly all her life, and David later sculpted a statue of her likeness.
- Finn Tanaka: A rich young artist who becomes David's rival. His art tends to be trite and incomprehensible, but his wealthy background and relationship with Ollie aid him in getting showcased. After David sabotages his sculpture, Finn aids the police in tracking him down, though ironically the vandalized sculpture becomes even more sought after and makes Finn even richer.
- Michael Singer: Meg's current boyfriend when David meets her. He goes by "Mikey", and leads a street troupe who perform flash mob acts in hopes of viral attention. He has a brash attitude and pride that Meg attracts nearly everyone she meets. However, their relationship deteriorates as he goes for another woman, but after their breakup they eventually reconcile and remain friends.
- Marcos: One of Meg's roommates. Marcos is a taciturn Hispanic man who Meg also rescued from the streets and then dated, but the two split due to his Catholicism and her infertility.
- Sam: Meg's other roommate. She tends to be cynical and distrusting of any of Meg's new visitors. She has resentment from a lesbian encounter with Meg that occurred while the latter was drunk, and takes it upon herself to be her caretaker during depressive periods. She is a good cook, and takes heart medication.
- Mr. Zolkin: David's landlord, a large Russian man with connections to mobsters. He resents David for owning the enormous loft in his apartment complex, the artist having been granted it by the previous landlord for a reduced price. After one of David's sculptures falls through the floor due to its weight, he kicks David out and demands being repaid despite the rent not being due for several more days. David fears encountering him or one of his mob buddies throughout the story, but any of the Russians he encounters later turn out to be random passersby or Ms. Hammer's Ukrainian assistant.
- Roger: The owner of a New York art gallery. He dislikes David due to the artist's blunt and impolite attitude, but has poor taste in art that Ollie keeps in check.
- Penelope Hammer: A board member of Roger's art gallery. She is very supportive of hosting David's art, but largely because she is attracted to him despite being at least twenty years his senior.
- Detective David Smith: A detective for the New York Police Department. Due to his name, his coworkers put him on the case of tracking down the artist as a joke, though he stayed on regardless. Unlike the protagonist, he is married, middle-aged, and African-American. The two meet each other at the end and develop respect for each other, with the detective eventually reneging to letting the artist complete his sculpture.
- Brecht Becker: An art critic who visits David's showcase and gives his new art negative reviews. Though overly critical of David to the point of personal attack, he has a conceded point that David's first creations are unfocused and lack a combined theme. He continues to give poor reviews to David's nighttime sculptures across the city, and dislikes the work of Kara Walker.
- Clement Finklestein: A very old art critic who is initially supportive of David's showcase until David makes a poor joke about British modernism.
- Mr. Harris: Ms. Hammer's representative at David's showcase, commonly nicknamed "the money guy". Due to his background in investing, Ollie expects him to have poor artistic taste and little opinion of his own, but Harris turns out at the end to be strong willed enough to make his own decisions about David's sculptures.
- Mira Bhati: An Indian-American artist and mother. Like David, she becomes a candidate for Roger's gallery, and makes miniature dioramas containing detailed scenes. David starts to consider her art even better than his, and she has somewhat accepted the possibility of remaining unknown. However, Ollie choosing Finn for the spot results in her also being left out.

== Development ==
Scott McCloud built a reputation as a formalist in comics. He first brought attention to his work with the comic-book series Zot! (1984—1990). He rose to prominence in 1993 with Understanding Comics, a theoretical work on the comics medium executed in comics. He was an early pioneer of webcomics, a form whose formal boundaries he dedicated himself to pushing. In middle age he came to feel he had a "big, gaping hole in [his] résumé" in that he had built a large body of theoretical work but had not produced a substantial stand-alone work of fiction. The Sculptor was the first such work McCloud had published in twenty years.

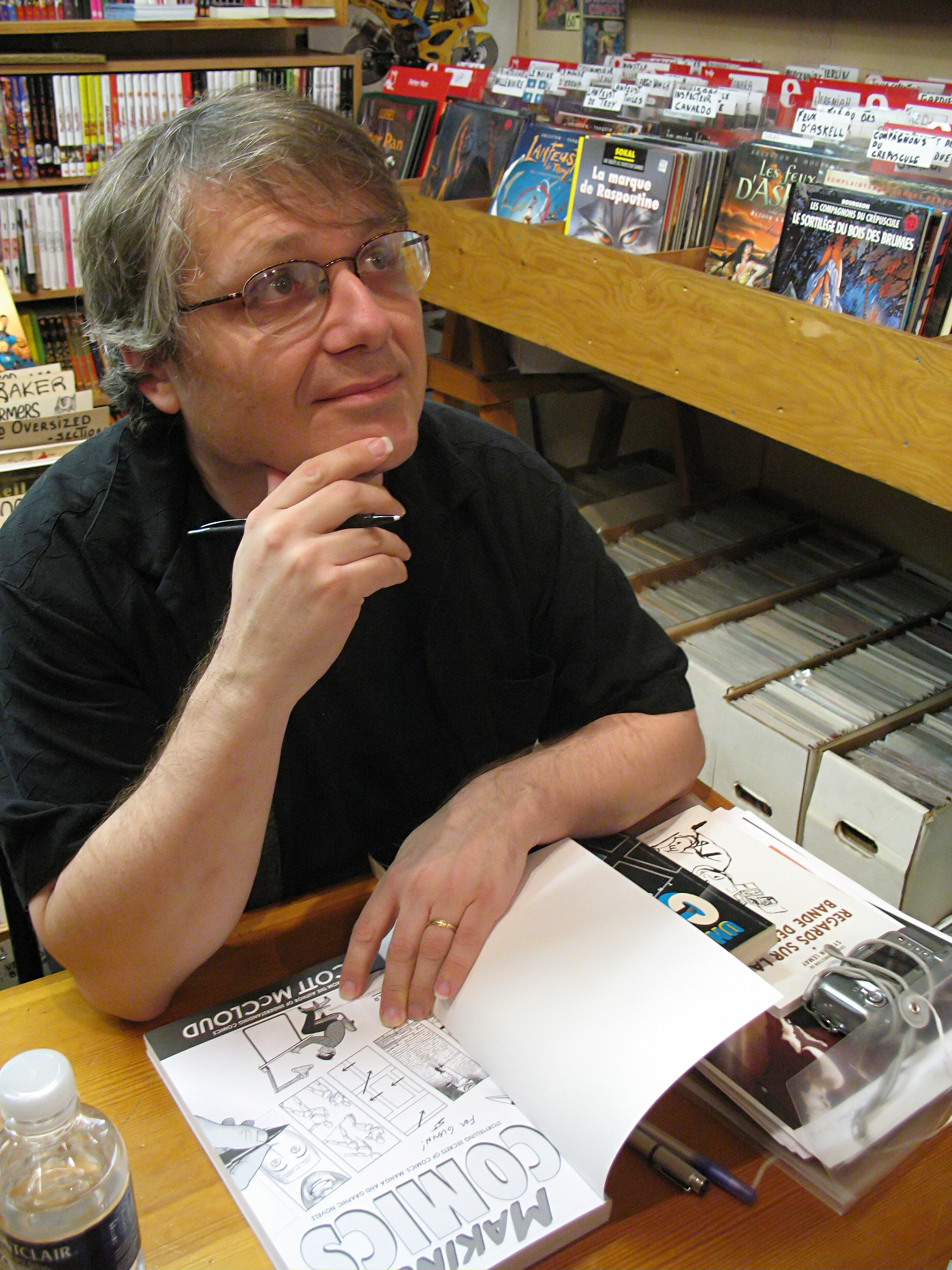
Scott McCloud spent five years developing The Sculptor.

McCloud spent five years developing the book. He began by making a complete rough outline, to which he made repeated revisions until he was satisfied, and went through four drafts over the first two years. The 496-page book appeared from First Second Books on February 3, 2015.

McCloud accompanied the book's publication with a worldwide promotional tour, beginning in the US and followed by Europe with planned visits to mid-year North American festivals including the MoCCA Festival, the Toronto Comic Arts Festival, and San Diego Comic-Con.

== Reception ==
The Sculptor's publication drew widespread attention in mainstream media; reviews appeared in such newspapers as The New York Times, the Los Angeles Times, and The Guardian.

An advance review in Publishers Weekly stated, "McCloud's epic generates magic and makes an early play for graphic novel of the year." M G. Lord at the Los Angeles Times praised the artwork and called McCloud a "master of pacing", but "could not connect emotionally to the love story". James Martin at The Telegraph called McCloud "a master at work" in the book, and gave it four stars out of five. Tim Martin at The Guardian called the artwork "wonderfully affecting", and called the story "inventive and touching ... compelling proof that McCloud can walk the walk as well as talking the talk".

== Adaptations ==
Bidding for the film rights to the book was reported to have been heated. Shortly after the book's release, Sony announced it had gained the rights to adaptation with the involvement of Scott Rudin, who was to produce with Josh Bratman. It was announced that Destin Daniel Cretton will direct the film.
