= Tim Levins =

Canadian comic book artist

- Born: Tim Levins

Tim Levins is a Canadian comic book artist who co-created The Copybook Tales with writer J. Torres. In 1998, he and Torres created Siren, a miniseries for Image Comics, and in 2008 they created The Family Dynamic for DC Comics. From 1999 to 2003 he was the penciller on Batman: Gotham Adventures, working with writer Scott Peterson.

Levins has also illustrated such titles as Flinch, Justice League Adventures, Scooby-Doo and Amazing Spider-Man Family.
