= Daniel Merlin Goodbrey =

British cartoonist

- Area: Writer
- Notable works: Brainfist; Iron Man 2020: Endless Stolen Sky; The Rule of Death

Daniel Merlin Goodbrey is an English writer known for his work in webcomics and the British small press.

== Biography ==
Goodbrey became known as a creator of experimental digital comics and Hypercomics (infinite canvas webcomics using Adobe Flash).

He is the inventor of the Tarquin engine, an Adobe Flash script for creating infinite canvas webcomics. Cartoonist Scott McCloud has used the Tarquin engine for the creation of some of his comics.

His recent works include Iron Man 2020 for Marvel Comics.

Goodbrey currently lives in Welwyn Garden City where he lectures in Narrative & Interaction Design at The University of Hertfordshire.

His work was featured in a group exhibition at Pump House Gallery in London in September 2010.

== Bibliography ==
- Six-Gun: Tales of an Unfolded Earth (Hyperfiction)
- I Bleed Scorpions (British small press comic)
- Mr. Nile - The Illustrated Bastard (British small press comic)
- Brainfist (webcomic)
- All Knowledge is Strange (webcomic)
- The Last Sane Cowboy and Other Stories (AiT/Planet Lar)
- "Emperor None" (with Brian Denham, in Giant-Size Avengers Special #1, Marvel Comics, February 2008)
- Iron Man 2020: "Endless Stolen Sky" (with art by Lou Kang, in Astonishing Tales #1-6, Marvel Comics, April–September 2009)
- The Rule of Death (with art by Douglas Noble, webcomic, Serializer)
- Necessary Monsters (with art by Sean Azzopardi, webcomic)

== Awards ==
- Isotope Award for Excellence in mini-comics in 2004
- Isotope Award for Excellence in 2005 for 'The Last Sane Cowboy'
