= The Batman Adventures =

DC Comics comic book series

- Cover of The Batman Adventures Vol. 1. Art by Ty Templeton.

Publication information
- Genre: Superhero
- Publication date: 1992–2004

The Batman Adventures is a DC Comics comic book series featuring Batman, set in the universe of Batman: The Animated Series and its successors.

== Overview ==
The Batman Adventures was created to tie-in with the Batman: The Animated Series. As the animated series changed with each successive re-branding and relaunch, so too did The Batman Adventures. It was originally conceived as a miniseries, but eventually got its status as tie-in.

The success of The Batman Adventures has also led to a set of "Adventures" titles mirroring the animated series that followed Batman: The Animated Series, including Superman Adventures (based on Superman: The Animated Series) and Justice League Adventures (based on Justice League).

== The Batman Adventures (vol. 1, 1992–1995) ==
Based on Batman: The Animated Series, the first series ran for 36 issues, 2 annuals, and 3 specials (Mad Love and Holiday Special, which were both adapted into episodes for The New Batman Adventures, plus an adaptation of the film Batman: Mask of the Phantasm). The first annual introduces Roxy Rocket, who would later appear in The New Batman Adventures episode "The Ultimate Thrill" and the Superman: The Animated Series episode "Knight Time". Most of the issues were written by Kelley Puckett, and illustrated by Mike Parobeck and Rick Burchett, though Ty Templeton did the writing and art on a few issues. Mad Love was written by Paul Dini and illustrated by Bruce Timm, while the holiday special was written and illustrated by a number of creative people who had worked on the animated series, including Paul Dini, Bruce Timm, Glen Murakami, Dan Riba, and Kevin Altieri.

== The Batman and Robin Adventures (1995–1997) ==
Following the re-branding of the animated series as The Adventures of Batman and Robin, the comic series was relaunched. It ran for 25 issues and 2 annuals, as well as 2 specials (an adaptation of Batman & Mr. Freeze: SubZero; and Dark Claw Adventures, a non-canon Amalgam comic featuring the Batman-Wolverine hybrid). Ty Templeton was the regular writer, with Rick Burchett as the artist. However, according to colorist Rick Taylor, the series was cancelled before many planned stories could be published. Some of them included another Batgirl and Robin team up, Batman teaching a grieving widower the futility of vengeance, the origin of the Threatening Three and the debut of Anarky.

== The Batman Adventures: The Lost Years (1998) ==
Shortly after The New Batman Adventures began airing on Kids' WB, DC Comics published a five-issue miniseries titled The Batman Adventures: The Lost Years. This series bridged the gap between the end of Batman: The Animated Series and the start of The New Batman Adventures. Additionally, the first two issues were adapted from the episode "Old Wounds", and issues #4 and the end of issue #5 were adaptations of the episode "Sins of the Father".

Book One: Robin (Dick Grayson) voices his disapproval regarding Batman's tolerance of the crime-fighting activities of the relatively untrained Batgirl and takes it upon himself to stop her. Subsequently, Batman deduces that Batgirl is actually Barbara Gordon while watching her play tennis against Dick – he realizes that she moves just like Batgirl. Batman decides to take Batgirl under his wing and give her the training she needs. Robin is upset by this decision and argues with Batman, but refuses to change his mind.

Book Two: Bruce and Dick continue their argument up through Dick's college graduation ceremony. When the Joker unleashes a radar jammer that can cause aircraft to crash, Batman and Batgirl battle him and his gang before Dick, as Robin, intervenes. The Joker is defeated, but Dick is enraged at Batman, punches him, and storms away. He decides to leave Gotham City despite the protests of Alfred and Barbara.

Book Three: Dick breaks up a smuggling operation by Two-Face and discovers an ancient African tribe, where he learns combat techniques from them, finally taking the first steps out of Batman's shadow. In Africa, Dick develops a new persona for himself: Nightwing.

Book Four: Batman becomes angrier and more driven because of Dick's departure – his new partner, Batgirl, is concerned over his change in personality. One night, while on the trail of Two-Face, Batman saves young Tim Drake, son of petty criminal Steve Drake. Shifty was trying to stop Two-Face from holding Gotham City ransom prior to his death, but was killed, and Tim seeks to honor his father's dying wish. Batman trained Tim into Robin to save him from a life of crime. Two-Face was captured and Batman took in Tim as his second ward.

Book Five: Dick joins an expedition to find a group of Tibetan monks who have lost an artifact, agreeing to recover the artifact in exchange for their secret of flight (the winged costume). He succeeds in gaining the artifact back from Ra's al Ghul. Succeeding, he visits Batman and reveals his new identity of Nightwing to him, Alfred, Batgirl, and Robin.

== Batman: Gotham Adventures (1998–2003) ==
A new series based on The New Batman Adventures titled Batman: Gotham Adventures ran for 60 issues. This was the longest-running series in the Batman Adventures line. Early issues were written by Ty Templeton and illustrated by Rick Burchett, while the team of Scott Peterson, Tim Levins, and Terry Beatty did most of the later issues. Batgirl and Nightwing appeared in most of the later issues. This series received a lot of positive reviews and was praised for its level of characterization.

== Batman Adventures (vol. 2, 2003–2004) ==
In 2003, DC Comics launched Batman Adventures, shortly after the cancellation of Batman: Gotham Adventures. The first issue was made available through regular purchases and Free Comic Book Day (May 3, 2003). It ran for 17 issues before being canceled to make way for The Batman Strikes!, a new title based on The Batman. Every issue had two stories, one by Dan Slott and Ty Templeton, while the other was by Templeton and Rick Burchett.

The running plot in the series is that the Penguin has managed to be elected Mayor of Gotham and has ordered the police led by a reluctant Jim Gordon to pursue and arrest Batman. Batman for his part refuses to believe the election of Penguin was legitimate and amid his other crime fighting efforts pursues evidence to de legitimize Penguin’s mayoralty.

Issue #15, written by Jason Hall, bridges the gap between Mr. Freeze's appearances in Batman: The Animated Series and Batman Beyond. Issue #17 ends the series with Batman confronting Joe Chill, the man who murdered his parents, although he is unaware of Chill's true identity.

=== Original plan for Batman Adventures #15 ===
The issue would have been a prequel to the Batman Beyond episode "Meltdown", explaining how Derek Powers acquired Mr. Freeze's disembodied head. Warren Powers, Derek's father, would have acquired Freeze's head and placed it inside his vault.

The issue would also have shown the Mr. Freeze robot killing Ferris Boyle (from the Batman: The Animated Series episode "Heart of Ice") and Grant Walker (from the episode "Deep Freeze"). Other differences include Nora Fries' visit with Koonak (from Batman & Mr. Freeze: SubZero) happening earlier in the issue, as well as focus on the deterioration of Nightwing and Batgirl's relationship.

=== The Red Hood ===
The Red Hood appears at the end of Batman Adventures #8. The creative team behind the story (Dan Slott and Ty Templeton) had hoped for a chance to resolve the subplot, but then the series was canceled. This version of Red Hood was supposed to be someone crucial to the DC Animated Universe. Slott revealed that Andrea Beaumont's mother had faked her death. He also mentioned that the background of the character would tie into subplots concerning Lucius Fox, the Valestra crime family from Batman: Mask of the Phantasm, and the Powers family, including a young Derek Powers. Several years later, the 2020 miniseries The Batman Adventures Continue, drawn by Templeton, introduced the Jason Todd incarnation of The Red Hood into the DCAU continuity.

== DC Classics: The Batman Adventures (2020) ==
To coincide with Batman: The Adventures Continue series (see below), DC published an ongoing monthly all-ages reprint series titled DC Classics: The Batman Adventures starting with the reprinting of The Batman Adventures (vol. 1) issue #1, until the series ended with issue #7 (collecting The Batman Adventures (vol. 1) issue #7). Each issue had a US $1.99 cover price. The series ran from June 2020 to December 2020 (cover dated Aug. 2020 - Feb. 2021).

- DC Classics: The Batman Adventures #1 (2020-06-09): Reprint of The Batman Adventures #1 (Penguin's Big Score).
- DC Classics: The Batman Adventures #2 (2020-07-07): Reprint of The Batman Adventures #2 (Catwoman's Killer Caper).

== Batman: The Adventures Continue (2020) ==
Batman: The Adventures Continue is a continuation of Batman: The Animated Series and its follow-up The New Batman Adventures. The book is co-written by Paul Dini and Alan Burnett, producers of the original animated television series, and illustrated by Ty Templeton, who also worked on The Batman Adventures. The limited series was initially released as a "digital first" comic, beginning in April 2020. The miniseries lasted eight issues. In March 2021, DC announced Season II of the series, with the first issue published in June 2021. As of June 2021, DC has planned seven issues for Season II.

== Additional characters ==
While there were many characters who never appeared in Batman: The Animated Series, the Batman Adventures series would occasionally introduce and feature characters who never appeared on screen in the DC Animated Universe.

=== Heroes and others ===
- Alec Holland
  - Batman Adventures #16 (September 2004)
- Julie Madison
  - Batman Adventures #1–2, 5 (June–July, October 2003)
- Phantom Stranger
  - Batman: Gotham Adventures #33 (February 2001)
- Eel O'Brian
  - Batman Adventures #6 (November 2003)

=== Villains ===
Anarky, a character from DC continuity that never appeared in Batman: The Animated Series, was depicted in The Batman Adventures #31. Cover art by Dev Madan.

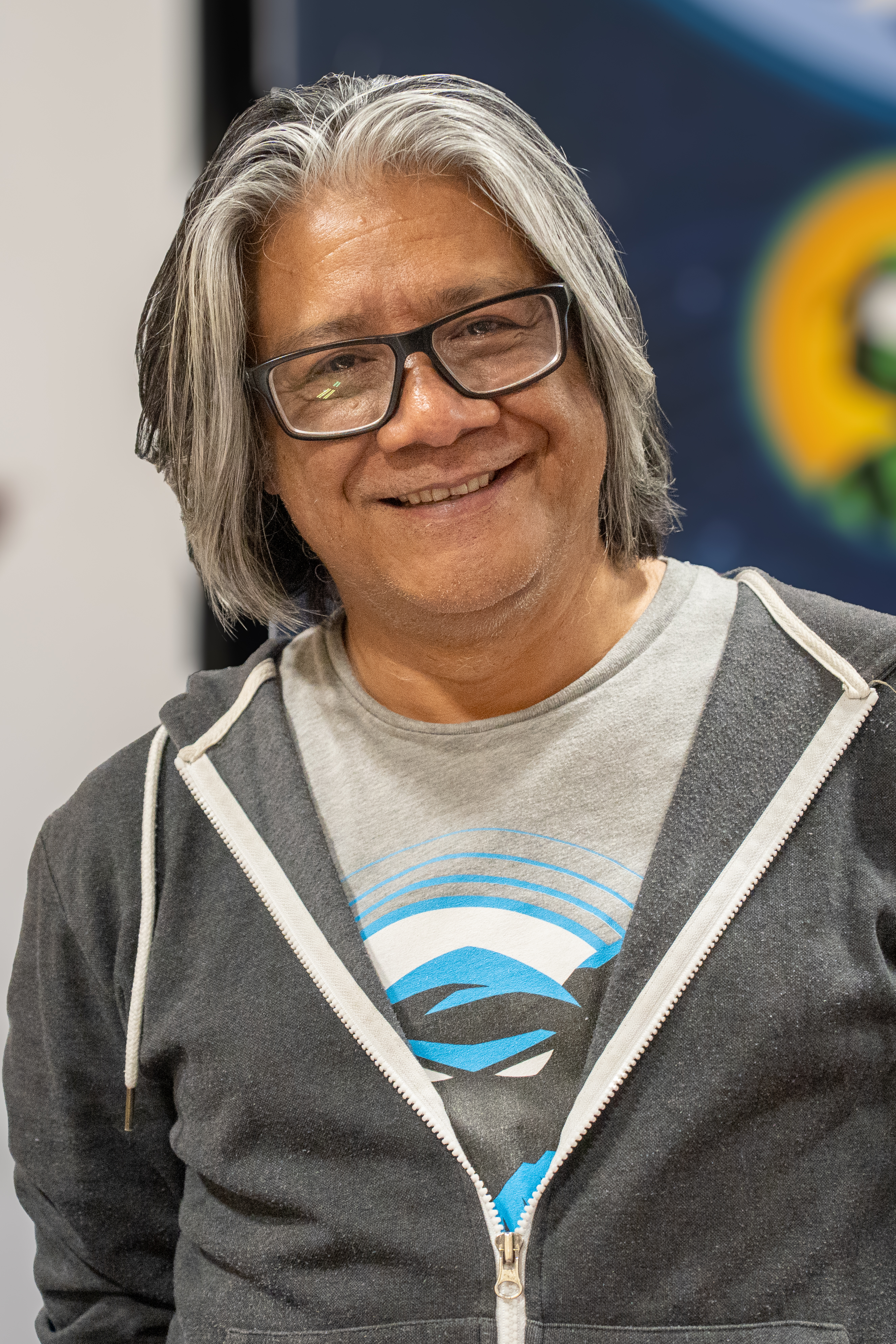
Dev Madan at Comic Con Oakland 2026

- Anarky
  - The Batman Adventures #31 (April 1995)
- Black Mask
  - Batman Adventures #5–8 (October 2003 – January 2004)
- Black Spider
  - Batman Adventures #5–8 (October 2003 – January 2004)
- Bronze Tiger
  - Batman Adventures #5–8 (October 2003 – January 2004)
- Cavalier
  - Batman Adventures #1 (June 2003)
- Gorilla Boss
  - Batman Adventures #5–8 (October 2003 – January 2004)
- Killer Moth
  - Batman Adventures #12 (May 2004)
- Red Hood
  - Batman Adventures #8 (January 2004)
- Sportsmaster
  - Batman Adventures #5–8 (October 2003 – January 2004)

== Collected editions ==
=== English version by DC Comics ===
Title	Material collected	Publication date	ISBN
The Batman Adventures	The Batman Adventures (1992) #1–6	December 1993	978-1-56389-098-7
Batman: The Dark Knight Adventures	The Batman Adventures (1992) #7–12	1994-06-01	1-56389-124-7; 978-1-56389-124-3
Batman: The Dark Knight Adventures	The Batman Adventures (1992) #7–12	2000-02-09	?
The Batman Adventures: "Mad Love"	The Batman Adventures: "Mad Love"	1995-11-08	1-56389-244-8/978-1-56389-244-8
The Batman Adventures: The Lost Years	The Batman Adventures: The Lost Years #1–5	1999-02-08	1-56389-483-1/978-1-56389-483-1
Batman: Gotham Adventures	Batman: Gotham Adventures #1–6	June 2000	978-1-56389-616-3/1-4012-9499-5/978-1-4012-9499-1
The Batman Adventures: Dangerous Dames and Demons	The Batman Adventures Annual #1–2; The Batman Adventures: Mad Love; Adventures of the DC Universe #3 (back-up story)	June 2003 (2004-02-03?)	978-1-56389-973-7
Batman: Harley and Ivy	Batman: Harley and Ivy #1–3; Harley and Ivy: Love on the Lam; Batman: Black and White Vol. 2 (coloured Batman: Gotham Knights #14)	2007-07-18	978-1-4012-1333-6
Batman: Mad Love and Other Stories	The Batman Adventures: "Mad Love", The Batman Adventures Annual #1-2, The Batman Adventures Holiday Special #1, Adventures in the DC Universe #3, Batman Black and White #1	2009-05-20	1-4012-2245-5; 978-1-4012-1333-6 (hardcover)
Batman: Mad Love and Other Stories	The Batman Adventures: "Mad Love", The Batman Adventures Annual #1-2, The Batman Adventures Holiday Special #1, Adventures in the DC Universe #3, Batman Black and White #1	2011-08-31	978-1-4012-3115-6 (trade paperback)
Batman Adventures Vol. 1: Rogues Gallery/The Batman Adventures: Rogues Gallery	Batman: Gotham Adventures #50, Batman Adventures (2003) #1–4	2004-06-02 (Digest-sized)	978-1-4012-0329-0
Batman Adventures Vol. 2: Shadows and Masks/The Batman Adventures: Shadows and Masks	Batman Adventures (2003) #5–9	2004-07-01 (Digest-sized)	978-1-4012-0330-6
Batman: His Greatest Adventures	Batman & Robin Adventures #4, Batman Adventures (1992) #3 and 19, The Batman Strikes! #6, Batman Adventures (2003) #11, Batman Beyond (series 2) #1	2017-09-13 (softcover)	1-4012-7693-8/978-1-4012-7693-5
Batman Adventures revised collected editions
The Batman Adventures: Mad Love Deluxe Edition	The Batman Adventures: "Mad Love"	2015-04-15	978-1-4012-5512-1
Batman: Harley and Ivy: The Deluxe Edition	Batman: Harley and Ivy #1–3, Batman Adventure Holiday Special #1, Batman: Gotham Knights #14, Batman and Robin Adventures Annual #1, Batman Adventures #1, Batman: Black and White #3	2016-02-10	1-4012-6080-2/978-1-4012-6080-4
The Batman Adventures Vol. 1	The Batman Adventures (1992) #1–10	2014-11-05	978-1-4012-5229-8
The Batman Adventures Vol. 2	The Batman Adventures (1992) #11–20	2015-05-27	978-1-4012-5463-6
The Batman Adventures Vol. 3	The Batman Adventures (1992) #21–27, Annual #1	2015-10-28	978-1-4012-5872-6
The Batman Adventures Vol. 4	The Batman Adventures (1992) #28-36, Annual #2, The Batman Adventures Holiday Special #1	2016-04-06	978-1-4012-6061-3
The Batman Adventures Omnibus	The Batman Adventures (1992) #1-36, Annual #1-2, The Batman Adventures Holiday Special #1, The Batman Adventures: "Mad Love", Batman: Black and White (unknown issues)	2023-09-05	978-1-77952-119-4
Batman & Robin Adventures Vol. 1	Batman & Robin Adventures #1-10	2016-12-14	978-1-4012-6783-4
Batman & Robin Adventures Vol. 2	Batman & Robin Adventures #11-18, Annual #1	2017-12-06	978-1-4012-7405-4
Batman & Robin Adventures Vol. 3	Batman & Robin Adventures #19-25, Annual #2	2018-07-18	978-1-4012-8138-0
The Batman & Robin Adventures Omnibus	Batman & Robin Adventures #1-25, Annual #1-2, The Batman Adventures: The Lost Years #1-5, Batman & Robin Adventures: Sub-Zero #1	2024-07-09	978-1-77952-737-0
Batman: Gotham Adventures Omnibus Vol. 1	Batman: Gotham Adventures #1-42, Superman Adventures #25, Adventures in the DC Universe #3, The Batgirl Adventures #1, Batman: Gotham Knights #14, Harley and Ivy: Love on the Lam #1	2026-11-10	978-1-7995-0923-3
Batman Adventures: Batgirl-A League of Her Own	The Batgirl Adventures #1, Batman: Gotham Adventures #8-9, 22, 38; Shadow of the Batgirl (preview)	2020-08-18	1-77950-671-6; 978-1-77950-671-9/EAN-5 50999
Batman Adventures: Nightwing Rising	The Batman Adventures: The Lost Years #1-5, Batman: Gotham Adventures #1	2020-10-06	1-77950-722-4; 978-1-77950-722-8
Batman Adventures: Riddle Me This	Batman: Gotham Adventures #11+28+56+57, Batman Adventures (2003) #11	2021-03-31	1-77950-936-7; 978-1-77950-936-9
Batman Adventures: Cat Got Your Tongue?	Adventures in the DC Universe #2+19, Batman: Gotham Adventures #4+24+50, Batman Adventures (2003) #10, Flash Facts Chapter Two: If You Can't Handle Heat (preview)	2021-08-31	1-77951-080-2; 978-1-77951-080-8/EAN-5 50999
DC Comics: Girls Unite!/DC Girls Unite	Batman Adventures: Cat Got Your Tongue?, Supergirl Adventures: Girl of Steel, Batman Adventures: Batgirl A League of Her Own, Justice League Unlimited: Girl Power	2021-11-02	978-1-77951-362-5/EAN-5 53999

=== English/Spanish version by Berlitz Publishing ===
The Learn Spanish with Batman series includes relettered speech bubbles, with over 300 Spanish words and phrases in red replacing the original text. Outside the comic panels frame, the replaced Spanish and the corresponding English texts are printed at the page border, but the English texts do not necessarily matching the ones in original publications. The Aprende Ingles Con Batman versions are in English text.

Title	Material collected	Publication date	ISBN
Learn Spanish with Batman: Rogues Gallery/Learn Spanish with Batman Volume 1	Batman: Gotham Adventures #50, Batman Adventures (2003) #1–4	2007-12-01?	981-268-181-7/978-981-268-181-2
Learn Spanish with Batman: Shadows and Masks/Learn Spanish with Batman Volume 2	Batman Adventures (2003) #5–9	2007-12-01?	981-268-182-5/978-981-268-182-9
Aprende Ingles Con Batman: Galería de villanos	Batman: Gotham Adventures #50, Batman Adventures (2003) #1–4	2007-12-01?	981-268-202-3/978-981-268-202-4

=== Spanish version by OVNI Press ===
Title	Material collected	Publication date	ISBN
Batman: Damas y Demonios	The Batman Adventures Annual #1+3, The Batman Adventures Holiday Special #1, Superman Adventures #25	2019-10-10	978-987-724-527-1

=== French version by Urban Comics ===
Title	Material collected	Publication date	ISBN
Batman Aventures Volume 1	Batman Aventures #1-10	2016-03-25	ISBN 978-2-36577-848-0
Batman Aventures Volume 2	Batman Adventure #11-20	2016-11-10	ISBN 978-2-36577-913-5
Batman Aventures Volume 3	Batman Adventures #21-27 + Annual #1	2017-03-24	ISBN 979-10-268-1109-1
Batman Aventures Volume 4	Batman Adventures #28-36 + Holiday Special + Annual #2	2017-09-29	ISBN 979-10-268-1177-0
Batman & Robin Aventures Volume 1	Batman & Robin Adventures #1-10	2018-02-23	ISBN 979-10-268-1401-6
Batman & Robin Aventures Volume 2	Batman & Robin Adventures #11-18 & Annual #1	2018-09-28	ISBN 979-10-268-1402-3
Batman & Robin Aventures Volume 3	Batman & Robin Adventures #19-25 & Annual #2	2019-05-17	ISBN 979-10-268-1815-1
Gotham Adventures Volume 1	Batman Adventures: The Lost Years #1-5 + Gotham Adventures #1-5	2019-06-21	ISBN 979-10-268-1509-9
Gotham Adventures Volume 2	Batman Gotham Adventures #6-16	2019-12-06	ISBN 979-10-268-2032-1
Gotham Adventures Volume 3	Batman Gotham Adventures #17-27	2021-01-22	ISBN 979-10-268-1569-3
Gotham Adventures Volume 4	Batman Gotham Adventures #28-38	2021-06-04	ISBN 979-10-268-2177-9
Gotham Adventures Volume 5	Batman Gotham Adventures #39-49	2022-08-19	ISBN 979-10-268-2175-5
Gotham Adventures Volume 6	Batman Gotham Adventures #50-60	2023-05-12	ISBN 979-10-268-2799-3
Batman - Les Nouvelles Aventures Volume 1	Batman Aventures Vol. 2 #1-9	2015-03-13	ISBN 978-2-36577-627-1
Batman - Les Nouvelles Aventures Volume 2	Batman Aventures Vol. 2 #10-17	2015-11-13	ISBN 978-2-36577-707-0
Batman & les Tortues Ninja Aventures	Batman / Teenage Mutant Ninja Turtles Adventures (2017) #1-6	2018-01-26	ISBN 979-10-268-1331-6
Gotham Girls	Batgirl Adventures #1 + Gotham Girls #1-5 + Poison & Ivy #1-3	2015-03-13	978-2-36577-628-8 (256-page version)
Gotham Girls	Batgirl Adventures #1 + Gotham Girls #1-5	2022-08-19	979-10-268-2829-7 (184-page version)
Batman: Les adaptation animées	Batman: Mask of the Phantasm – The Official Comic Adaptation + Batman and Robin Adventures Sub-Zero	2022-02-12	ISBN 979-10-268-2138-0
Batman: L’Aventure Continue ! Volume 1	Batman: The Adventures Continue Vol. 1 #1-8	2024-04-12	ISBN 979-10-268-2977-5

== See also ==
- List of DC Comics publications
- Superman Adventures
- Adventures in the DC Universe/Justice League Adventures/Justice League Unlimited
