= The Batman Adventures: Mad Love =

1993 comic book by Paul Dini and Bruce Timm

- Second printing cover of The Batman Adventures: Mad Love (1994)

Publication information
- Publisher: DC Comics
- Format: One-shot
- Genre: Superhero
- Publication date: December 14, 1993
- No. of issues: 1
- Main character(s): Harley Quinn; Joker; Batman

Creative team
- Written by: Paul Dini (plot and script); Bruce Timm (plot)
- Penciller: Bruce Timm
- Inker(s): Bruce Timm; Glen Murakami
- Letterer: Tim Harkins
- Colorist(s): Bruce Timm; Rick Taylor
- Editor(s): Scott Peterson; Darren Vincenzo

Collected editions
- The Batman Adventures: Dangerous Dames & Demons: ISBN 978-1-5638-9973-7
- Batman: Mad Love and Other Stories: ISBN 978-1-4012-2245-1
- Batman Adventures: Mad Love Deluxe Edition: ISBN 978-1-4012-5512-1

The Batman Adventures: Mad Love is a one-shot comic book written by Paul Dini and Bruce Timm. It won the Eisner Award for Best Single Issue and the Harvey Award for Best Single Issue or Story in 1994. Mad Love was adapted as an episode of the animated series The New Batman Adventures, among other examples, like the video game Batman: Arkham Asylum and the film Suicide Squad. In 2018, Titan Books released a novelization of Mad Love written by Dini and Pat Cadigan, which expanded upon the original comic book.

Set in the continuity of Batman: The Animated Series, the comic presents an origin story of supervillain Joker's henchwoman Harley Quinn. It presents her past as a psychologist at Arkham Asylum who then falls in love with him.

== Background ==
Paul Dini and Bruce Timm came up with Mad Love after DC invited them to create a special issue for the Batman: The Animated Series tie-in comics Batman Adventures, which they decided would be an origin story for the Joker's sidekick, Harley Quinn. Dini wanted to tell a story that would expand her role beyond a costumed henchperson, and thought that adding the idea of her being the Joker's former therapist would make her unusual affection for the Joker tragic. Dini and Timm thought of making Harley a former doctor at Arkham Asylum seduced by the Joker to become his loyal follower and being put "in the role of the long-suffering girlfriend", while taking inspiration from fans of criminals who write them letters stating that they understand and "see the good" in them.

Dini sees Mad Love as a cautionary tale about loving someone "recklessly, obsessively, and for too long", and described Harley's experiences as tragicomic and a reflection of the readers in a "funhouse mirror, distorted and all too willing to play the fool for someone we'd be much better off without."

== Themes ==
Mad Love explores domestic violence and codependency. Hilary Golstein of IGN noted that despite being over-the-top lunatics, Harley is still the "typical abused spouse", the Joker the "typical disassociated husband", stating that the comic "shows the cycle of domestic violence that dominates the lives of many people in America." Multiversity Comics' Matthew Garcia observed that Mad Love's depiction of domestic abuse through the villains produces a "new and somewhat more terrifying perspective", pointing out how "for all the horrific stuff in and out of canon Joker has ever done, nothing feels quite as despicable as his behavior toward Harley", possibly because of the contrast of "very common behavior" with Joker's over-the-top villainy. Garcia also noted that despite the gags, Timm and Dini do not downplay Joker's abusive treatment of Harley, and noticed that as the comic progressed, the Joker "becomes more and more menacing, cast in shadows and silhouettes, a constant presence over her." Mad Love showcases Harley's dependency on the Joker; on the ending in which she falls in love with him again despite the abuse, Dini stated, "Harley could swear off him and be very strong, but if there's even the hint that he wants her back or he's reformed, she'll go back."

== Plot ==
Mad Love begins with Joker, accompanied by his new sidekick, Harley Quinn, and his scheme of killing Commissioner Gordon, which is foiled by Batman. The Joker retreats with Harley, while Batman returns to the Batcave. With his butler, Alfred Pennyworth, Batman discusses Harley's questionable past: while studying in Gotham State University with a gymnastics scholarship, Harley, formerly named Harleen Quinzel, aimed to get a degree in psychology by sleeping with her professors, and planned to become a pop psychologist writing self-help books.

Meanwhile, in his hideout, a frustrated Joker struggles to devise a plan, with Harley attempting to comfort him, which annoys the Joker, inciting him to try to kill her, and later, to kick her out. A bemoaning Harley reflects on her current status as a wanted criminal in love with a psychopath who neglects her, concluding that Batman is to blame for their broken relationship. Harley then recalls her past in Arkham as an intern psychologist looking to profit off of its criminal patients by writing tell-all books, starting with her first encounter with the Joker. Having chosen him as an adequate subject to write about, with Joker luring her by suggesting he would tell her his secrets, Harleen set up sessions with the Joker, in which the Joker seduced an unwitting Harleen by placing himself as sympathetic, telling her he was abused as a child by his father, who was only happy once during a visit to the circus, then implying Batman as another figure who hurt him. As time passed, Harleen concluded that the Joker is a misunderstood figure constantly victimized by Batman, and that she had fallen in love with her patient, which she realizes is partly because he "could make [her] laugh again" when she had long felt restricted from "all amusement and fun". Later, during a week the Joker escaped from Arkham, a worried Harleen is distraught to see Batman returning a heavily injured Joker, inciting her to break him out; in the process, Harleen stole a jester costume and gag items, which she weaponized, from a costume shop, and adopted the persona Harley Quinn, a reworking of her name as a play on the theatrical clown character Harlequin which the Joker had suggested to her.

Harley determines that the only way she can make the Joker love her back is to kill Batman, which she decides to do using the Joker's unused plan of killing him in a tank of smiling piranhas, which Joker abandoned because piranhas cannot smile, a problem Harley solves by hanging the Batman upside down so the piranhas appear to be smiling from his perspective. Harley successfully captures Batman, but he distracts her by telling her truth; the Joker never loved anything or anyone except himself and he had been using her from the start, with the Joker's stories to her of being abused as a child all just lies he has told to others, with the details changing each time the Joker retold them. When she, in denial, tearfully insists the Joker really loves her, Batman convinces her to call him so he will know she would have accomplished her goal, as the piranhas would have left no convincing evidence. The Joker arrives, infuriated by how Harley would rob him of the privilege of killing Batman. Harley explains how using the Joker's plan means he will get credit, but her having to explain that fact at all makes it an unacceptable flaw to him, and he ultimately pushes her out a window, where she falls to the ground and is found gravely injured by nearby police officers. The Joker then decides to use the opportunity to finally kill Batman, which escalates into a chase ending atop a moving subway train. Batman taunts the Joker by saying that Harley, with her plan, had come closer to killing him than he ever did. The Joker attacks him in a fit of rage, and Batman retaliates, ending with Joker falling down into a burning smokestack.

In Arkham Asylum, Harleen denounces the Joker, determined to heal and move on. Lying on her bed a moment later, however, Harleen finds flowers sent by the Joker with a "get well soon" card and falls in love with him again.

== Reprints ==
Mad Love was reprinted as a graphic novella in 1998 (ISBN 1-56389-244-8), and has been collected with other stories.

=== Collected editions ===
Title	Material collected	Published date	ISBN	Notes
The Batman Adventures: Dangerous Dames & Demons	Batman Adventures: Mad Love #1, Batman Adventures Annual #1–2, Batman Adventures Holiday Special, and Adventures in the DC Universe #3	2003	978-1-56389-973-7	
Batman: Mad Love and Other Stories	Batman Adventures: Mad Love #1, Batman Adventures Annual #1–2, Batman Adventures Holiday Special, Adventures in the DC Universe #3, and Batman Black and White #1	May 12, 2009	978-1-4012-2245-1	
Batman Adventures: Mad Love Deluxe Edition	Batman Adventures: Mad Love #1, with bonus material	April 21, 2015	978-1-4012-5512-1	
The Joker: 80 Years of the Clown Prince of Crime: The Deluxe Edition	Batman #1, #159, #251, #321, #429, #614, Detective Comics #168, #475, #476, #826, Batman: The Killing Joke, Batman Adventures: Mad Love, Batman: Legends of the Dark Knight #50, Gotham Central #15, Detective Comics #1 (2011) and Batman #17 (2013).	June 2, 2020	1-4012-9993-8	

== Critical reception ==
IGN's Hilary Goldstein described Mad Love as "everything a comic book should be" and "one Batman book everyone should read." Multiversity Comics' Matthew Garcia stated that Mad Love is a "classic story for a reason."

== Awards ==
- Eisner Awards
  - Won Best Single Issue
  - Bruce Timm was nominated for Best Penciller/Inker
- Harvey Awards
  - Won Harvey Award for Best Single Issue or Story

== Adaptations ==
=== The New Batman Adventures ===
An animated adaptation of the issue, nearly identical in script and design to the original comic, originally aired on the WB Network on January 16, 1999, as an episode of The New Batman Adventures. The script was written by Paul Dini, the episode was directed by Butch Lukic, with Kevin Conroy, Mark Hamill, and Arleen Sorkin voicing the roles of Batman, Joker, and Harley Quinn. This faithfully adapted the comics with the exception of revised character designs and the removal of minor scenes due to pacing and time constraints.

=== Motion comics ===
In 2008, Warner Premiere Digital adapted Mad Love as a motion comic available for download through digital outlets such as iTunes and Xbox Live. Subscribers can download each chapter separately from Xbox Live. iTunes groups the seven chapters into three downloads (Chapters 1 and 2, Chapters 3, 4, & 5, and Chapters 6 and 7).

=== Batman: Arkham series ===
The 2009 video game Batman: Arkham Asylum, also scripted by Dini, takes much of the dialogue from Harley Quinn's patient interviews from Mad Love, with Mark Hamill and Arleen Sorkin reprising their roles as Joker and Harley. Batman: Arkham Origins, the 2013 prequel to Asylum, also utilizes Mad Love's plot in retelling Harley Quinn's first encounter with the Joker, who were now voiced by Tara Strong and Troy Baker.

=== Suicide Squad ===
David Ayer directed the 2016 film Suicide Squad, which incorporated several storylines of Joker and Harley Quinn, including Mad Love.

=== Novelization ===
Harley Quinn: Mad Love
- Author: Paul Dini and Pat Cadigan
- Genre: Superhero fiction
- Publisher: Titan Books
- Publication date: November 13, 2018
- Pages: 288
- ISBN: 978-1-78565-814-3

Harley Quinn: Mad Love is a novelization of The Batman Adventures: Mad Love written by Paul Dini and Pat Cadigan. It expands upon the original comic book, which featured the titular character's origin story.

==== Background ====
Paul Dini and Pat Cadigan wrote Harley Quinn: Mad Love as part of Titan Books' series of novelizations of iconic DC comics, such as Alan Moore's The Killing Joke. The novelization expanded upon the original story by exploring Harley's childhood and family, more of her time with the Joker, and subsequent events, as well as the motivations that led to her transformation, such as her dislike and distrust of authority. In writing the novel, Cadigan worked with Dini's outline, which included aspects not in the original comic. Dini and Cadigan also only corresponded through their editor during the writing process.

==== Critical reception ====
Impulse Gamer's Tony Smith called the novelization a "clever book adaptation", and noted that although the writers took liberties, they "honour the original story and content" while "add[ing] to it that in turn makes for an great read about one of the world's most popular villainesses". Smith commended Dini and Cadigan's writing, stating that they "really bring this broken individual to life and they provide an interesting psyche into Harleen Quinzel from her passions to motivations" and praised the "excellent pacing and drama" despite the minimal action. Brian Clements of AIPT Comics stated that the novel reintroduces Harley Quinn as "a woman with agency", which "makes her an anti-hero for new generations", and listed how the novel gives Harley Quinn a "backstory and actual agency", "makes her a well-rounded, sympathetic character", and clearly shows her transformation from "promising psychologist to sociopathic clown" as positives, while criticizing it for being "very tight" in places, "trying to get the plot through quickly."

=== Harley Quinn ===
The story of Mad Love is adapted in the Harley Quinn episode "All the Best Inmates Have Daddy Issues".
