= DC Animated Universe (comics) =

Fictional comic book universe

1977–2005, aka the "DC Bullet" (first era logo)

The following is a list of American comic books published by DC Comics as tie-ins or follow-ups to its animated media set in the DC Animated Universe.

== The Batman Adventures ==
The Batman Adventures was created as a comic book tie-in to Batman: The Animated Series and The New Batman Adventures. Various titles related to the animated series ran from 1992 to 2004, along with various mini-series and one-shots.

== Superman Adventures ==
Similar to The Batman Adventures, Superman Adventures was created as a comic book tie-in to Superman: The Animated Series. It ran between 1996 and 2002.

== Adventures in the DC Universe ==
Adventures in the DC Universe is a comic book series published by DC Comics from 1997 to 1998 for a total of 19 issues and one annual. Following on from the previous series The Batman Adventures and Superman Adventures, Adventures in the DC Universe used the same "animated style" as seen in the DC Animated Universe, but focused on a rotating cast of characters from throughout the DC Universe.

Most of the characters appearing in this series had yet to be seen in any DC Animated Universe series and, as such, their designs and histories were different from their later appearances in the television series, such as Justice League. For example, Kyle Rayner often appears in this series, but resembles his comics counterpart rather than his DCAU counterpart who had not yet appeared on Superman: The Animated Series.

== Justice League Adventures / Justice League Unlimited ==
Justice League Adventures is a DC comic book series featuring the Justice League, but set in the continuity (and style) of the DC Animated Universe television shows Justice League and Justice League Unlimited; as opposed to the regular DC Universe.

It is a sister title to The Batman Adventures (based on Batman: The Animated Series) and Superman Adventures (based on Superman: The Animated Series).

Justice League Adventures ran for 34 issues from 2002 to 2004 before being restarted under the title Justice League Unlimited (to match the recreation and renaming of the television series). The new title ran for 46 issues from 2004 to 2008 before being canceled in May 2008, ending the last production of the DC Animated Universe.

=== Justice League Infinity ===
Justice League Infinity is a comic book continuation of the animated series Justice League Unlimited. It debuted May 2021 in digital format and physically released in July of the same year. The series is written by J. M. DeMatteis and James Tucker and illustrated by Ethen Beavers.

== Batman Beyond and the Beyond universe ==
Batman Beyond received a number of ongoing comic book series and miniseries related to the TV series. Due to the popularity of the Batman Beyond concept, numerous tie-ins and cameos were created as a bridge between the DC Animated Universe and the DC Universe. Since 2012, DC Comics publishes three weekly digital series related to Batman Beyond and prints them monthly as Batman Beyond Unlimited.

== Additional characters ==
While the Justice League and Justice League Unlimited comics did use many characters from the DC Universe, some characters never made it to the screen. Those that did not appear in the television series are listed below:

=== Heroes ===
Character	Issues	Notes
Adam Strange	Justice League Adventures #25-26; Justice League Unlimited #4	Strange was to appear in the Justice League Unlimited episode "Hunter's Moon", but the character was off-limits to the creative team due to legal issues.
Alan Scott (Green Lantern)	Adventures in the DC Universe #4; Justice League Adventures #20 (cameo); Justice League Unlimited #40	Scott, along with the rest of the Justice Society of America, was to originally appear in the Justice League episode "Legends". The appearance was rejected because their portrayal was too similar to their Golden Age appearance, thus an analogue group (the Justice Guild of America) was created.
Alec Holland	Batman Adventures (vol. 2) #16	
Animal Man	Justice League Unlimited #29	
Atlanna	Adventures in the DC Universe #6	
Black Lightning	Justice League Unlimited #15, 27	Usage of the character (outside of the comic books) would have required paying royalties to his creator, Tony Isabella.
Blue Beetle	Adventures in the DC Universe #8; Justice League Unlimited #5, 20, 43	The rights to the character were unavailable due to the 1940s radio show of the same name.
Captain Marvel Jr.	Adventures in the DC Universe #7	
Connor Hawke (Green Arrow)	Adventures in the DC Universe #13, 16	
Detective Chimp	Justice League Unlimited #39	
Doctor Occult	Justice League Unlimited #14	
Firestorm	Justice League Unlimited #3, 8, 16	Was to be the main character of the Justice League Unlimited episode "The Greatest Story Never Told".
Freedom Fighters: Uncle Sam, Doll Man, Human Bomb, Phantom Lady, Ray, and Black Condor	Justice League Unlimited #17	
Guy Gardner	Adventures in the DC Universe #4 (cameo); Justice League Unlimited #32	
G'nort	Justice League Unlimited #46	
Impulse	Adventures in the DC Universe #13, Annual #1	
Jay Garrick (Flash)	Justice League Adventures #20 (cameo); Justice League Unlimited #12	Garrick, along with the rest of the Justice Society of America, was to originally appear in the Justice League episode "Legends". The appearance was rejected because their portrayal was too similar to their Golden Age appearance, thus an analogue group (the Justice Guild of America) was created.
Jim Corrigan	Justice League Unlimited #37	
Julie Madison	Batman Adventures (vol. 2) #1–2, 5	
Kamandi	Justice League Adventures #30	
Kon-El (Superboy)	Adventures in the DC Universe #14, Annual #1	
Kent Shakespeare	Justice League Adventures #28	
Mary Marvel	Adventures in the DC Universe #7; Justice League Unlimited #20, 45	
Phantom Stranger	Batman: Gotham Adventures #33; Justice League Adventures #31; Justice League Unlimited #14, 28	The Phantom Stranger was intended to appear in Adventures in the DC Universe #20, but the issue was never printed. Bruce Timm did want to use the Phantom Stranger and the Spectre, but could not receive permission, the reason for which was not stated.
Plastic Man	Batman Adventures (vol. 2) #6	
Power Girl	Adventures in the DC Universe #6; Justice League Unlimited #3, 13, 16	
Ragman	Justice League Unlimited #15	
Space Cabbie	Justice League Unlimited #18	
Spectre	Justice League Unlimited #37	
Thorn	Adventures in the DC Universe Annual #1	
Ultra the Multi-Alien	Adventures in the DC Universe #5	
XS	Adventures in the DC Universe #10	
Zauriel	Justice League Unlimited #7, 14	

=== Villains ===
Character	Issues	Notes
Anarky	The Batman Adventures #31; Batman Adventures (vol. 2) #17	
Anti-Monitor (cameo)	Justice League Unlimited #32	
Black Adam	Adventures in the DC Universe #7	
Black Manta	Justice League Unlimited #26	Black Manta was intended to appear in the Justice League episode "The Enemy Below", but was replaced by Deadshot. Black Manta was intended to appear in Justice League Unlimited, but was replaced with original character Devil Ray due to copyright issues.
Black Mask	Batman Adventures (vol. 2) #5–8	
Black Spider	Batman Adventures (vol. 2) #5–8	
Blockbuster	Adventures in the DC Universe #1	
Brain Storm	Justice League Unlimited #8	
Bronze Tiger	Batman Adventures (vol. 2) #5–8	
Cain and Abel	The Batman Adventures #5	
Cavalier	Batman Adventures (vol. 2) #1	
Chuma	Adventures in the DC Universe #3	
Chemo	Justice League Adventures #13	
Cypher	Adventures in the DC Universe #1, 2, 7, 8, 9; DC Comics Presents: Wonder Woman Adventures #1	
Cryonic Man	Justice League Adventures #12	
Demolition Team	Justice League Unlimited #43	
Doctor Double X	Justice League Adventures #29	
Doctor Light	Adventures in the DC Universe #1; Justice League Adventures #6, 13; DC Comics Presents: Wonder Woman Adventures #1	
Doctor Sivana	Adventures in the DC Universe #7; Justice League Unlimited #15	
Eobard Thawne	Justice League Adventures #6	
General Zod	Justice League Unlimited #34	He first appeared in Superman Adventures #21, but the story acted as a new introduction for Zod.
Girder	Justice League Unlimited #16	
Gorilla Boss	Batman Adventures #5–8	
Houngan	Adventures in the DC Universe #4	
Kilg%re	Justice League Adventures #28.	
Lady Eve	Justice League: The Animated Series Guide; Justice League Adventures #23	
Madame Rouge	Justice League Unlimited #31; Justice League Adventures #6	
Matter Master	Justice League Unlimited #31	
Minister Blizzard	Justice League Adventures #12	
Mister Atom	Justice League Unlimited #15, 20	
Plasmus	Justice League Unlimited #31	
Red Hood	Batman Adventures #8; DC Comics Presents: Wonder Woman Adventures #1	
Shrapnel	Adventures in the DC Universe #4	
Snowman	Justice League Adventures #12	
Time Commander	Justice League Unlimited #19	

== Collected editions ==
Title	Material collected	Publication date	ISBN
The Batman Adventures: Dangerous Dames and Demons	Includes a reprint of the backup story from Adventures in the DC Universe #3	June 2003	978-1563899737
Shazam! The Greatest Stories Ever Told	Includes a reprint of the first story from Adventures in the DC Universe #15	February 2008	978-1401216740
Justice League Adventures (TPB)	Justice League Adventures #1, 3, 6, 10–13	2003	978-1840236163
DC Comics Presents: Wonder Woman Adventures #1	Adventures in the DC Universe #1, 3, 11, 19	September 2012	
Justice League Adventures (digest)
Volume 1: The Magnificent Seven	Justice League Adventures #3, 6, 10–12	February 2004	978-1401201791
Volume 2: Friends and Foes	Justice League Adventures #13-14, 16, 19–20	February 2004	978-1401201807
Justice League Unlimited (digest)
Volume 1: United They Stand	Justice League Unlimited #1-5	June 2005	978-1401205126
Volume 2: World's Greatest Heroes	Justice League Unlimited #6-10	April 2006	978-1401210144
Volume 3: Champions of Justice	Justice League Unlimited #11-15	April 2006	978-1401210151
Justice League Unlimited (TPB, continues from the digest series)
Volume 4: Ties That Bind	Justice League Unlimited #16-22	April 2008	978-1401216917
Volume 5: Heroes	Justice League Unlimited #23-29	April 2009	978-1401222024
