= Making Comics =

Book by Scott McCloud

Making Comics: Storytelling Secrets of Comics, Manga, and Graphic Novels
- The cover of Making Comics
- Author: Scott McCloud
- Cover artist: Scott McCloud
- Language: English
- Subject: Comic books
- Publisher: William Morrow Paperbacks/HarperCollins
- Publication date: September 2006
- Publication place: U.S.A.
- Pages: 272
- ISBN: 0-060-78094-0
- OCLC: 71225478
- Preceded by: Reinventing Comics

Making Comics: Storytelling Secrets of Comics, Manga, and Graphic Novels is a book by comic book writer and artist Scott McCloud, published by William Morrow Paperbacks in 2006. A study of methods of constructing comics, it is a thematic sequel to McCloud's critically acclaimed books Understanding Comics and Reinventing Comics.

As with its two predecessors, Making Comics is itself in comic book form, with McCloud's avatar (now "aged" 13 years since Understanding Comics) leading the reader through the pages. The book details the processes behind storytelling, character design, and other challenges specific to the medium, with illustrative examples drawn from the history of comics. Complex topics are frequently boiled down to a few principles, such as classifying cartoonists into four types, or identifying the "six basic emotions".

The book is dedicated to Will Eisner.

== Development ==
McCloud drew Making Comics digitally on a Cintiq monitor. He was dealing with tendinitis in his hands during the early production of the book, and McCloud found that the monitor worked very comfortably, as it allowed him to draw with his forearm rather than with his wrist.

== Publication history ==
McCloud thought of Making Comics as the true successor to Understanding Comics, with Reinventing Comics being more of an outlier. He felt compelled to the book as he was working on improving his own skills as a cartoonist. In contrast to Understanding Comics and Reinventing Comics, Making Comics was drawn entirely on a digital tablet.

McCloud promoted the book with a Making Comics 50 State Tour, which also included visits to Canada, England, and France, and ended in September 2007.

== Summary ==
Making Comics is divided into five main sections:

1. "Writing with Pictures" – topics include "Clarity and Persuasion", "The Five Choices", "Choice of Moment", "Choice of Frame", "Choice of Image", "Choice of Word", "Choice of Flow", "Working Methods", "Clarity vs. Intensity" and "Intensity vs. Persuasion"
2. "Stories for Humans" – topics include "Symmetry and Recognition", "3 Steps to Believable Characters", "Character Design", "Facial Expressions" and "Body Language"
3. "The Power of Words" – topics include "Balance and Integration", "The 7 Types of Word/Picture Combinations", "Word Balloons", "Sound Effects", "Writer/Artist Collaborations", "Picking Your Story" and "Heritage and Strengths"
4. "World Building" – topics include "Being There", "Revisiting the Establishing Shot", "Regional Variations", "Comic Strip Minimalism", "Perspective", "Reference and Research", and "Not Just Backgrounds"
5. "Tools, Techniques, & Technology" – topics include "The Only Essential Tools", "Drawing on the Cheap", "Traditional Tools", "Digital Tools", "Lettering and Fonts", "Equipment" and "Publishing Alternatives"

The first four sections conclude with notes and exercises.

== Awards and honors ==
Making Comics was nominated for the 2007 Harvey Award for Best Biographical, Historical or Journalistic Presentation. It was named the Favourite Comics-Related Book at the 2007 Eagle Awards. In addition, it was a 2007 Quill Award-winner for Best Graphic Novel.

== See also ==
- Comics and Sequential Art – Nonfiction book by Will Eisner
- Graphic Storytelling and Visual Narrative – 1996 nonfiction book by Will Eisner
- How to Draw Comics the Marvel Way – 1978 book by Stan Lee and John Buscema
