= Scott McCloud =

American cartoonist (born 1960)

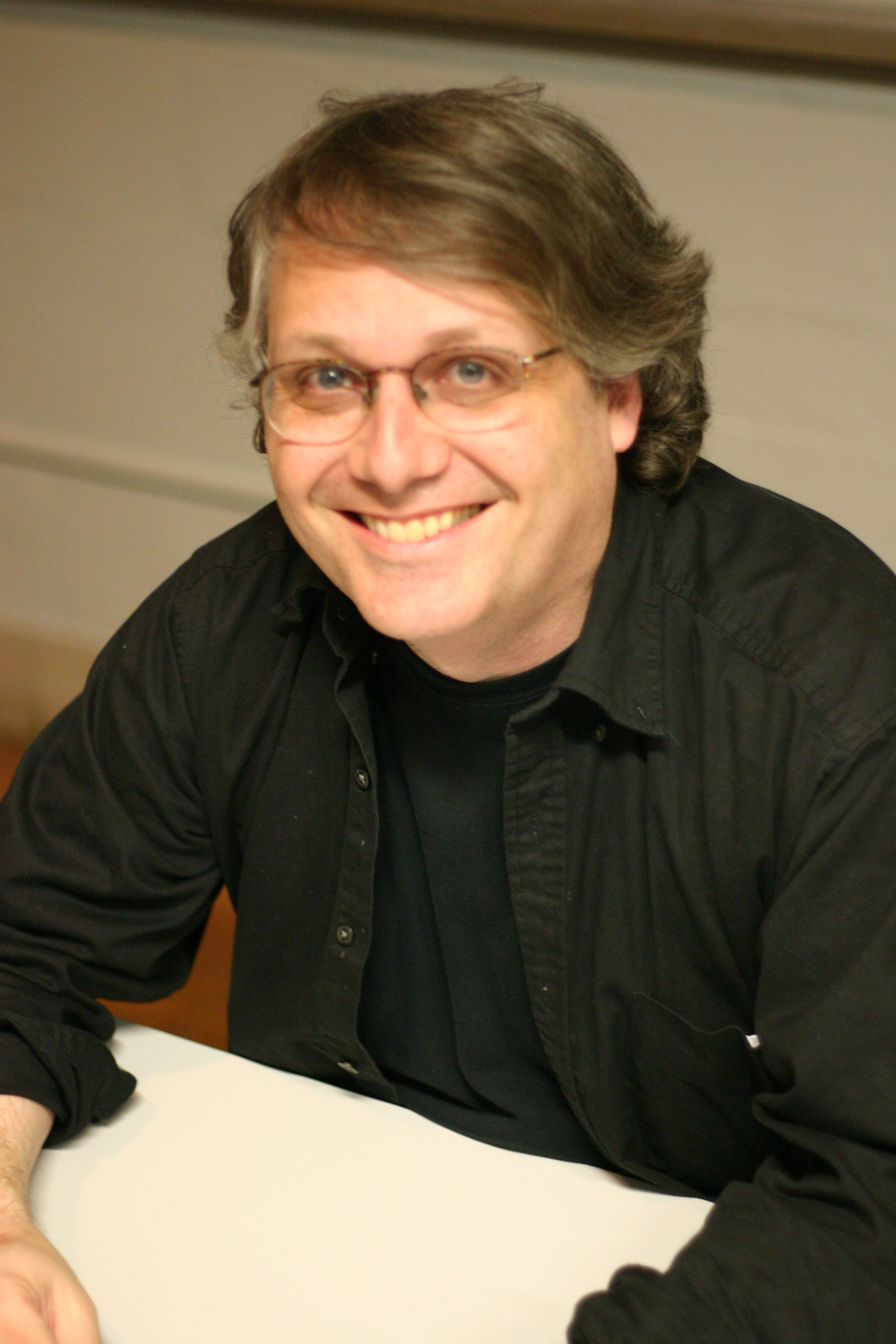
- McCloud at the Rhode Island School of Design on a book tour for Making Comics, March 2007
- Born: Scott McLeod; June 10, 1960 (age 66) Boston, Massachusetts, U.S.
- Areas: Cartoonist; Comics theorist
- Notable works: Zot!; Understanding Comics; Reinventing Comics; Making Comics; The Sculptor
- Awards: 1985 Russ Manning Award; 1985 Jack Kirby Award; 1994 Eisner Award; 3 Harvey Awards

Scott McCloud (born Scott Willard McLeod; June 10, 1960) is an American cartoonist and comics theorist. His non-fiction books about comics, Understanding Comics (1993), Reinventing Comics (2000), and Making Comics (2006), are made in comic form.

He became established as a comics creator in the 1980s as an independent superhero cartoonist and advocate for creator's rights. He rose to prominence in the industry beginning in the 1990s for his non-fiction works about the medium; he has advocated for the use of new technology in the creation and distribution of comics.

== Early life ==
McCloud was born in 1960 in Boston the youngest child of Willard Wise (a blind inventor and engineer) and Patricia Beatrice McLeod. He grew up mostly in Lexington, Massachusetts. He decided he wanted to be a comics artist in 1975, during his junior year in high school.

He attended an illustration program at Syracuse University in Syracuse, New York and graduated with a Bachelor of Fine Arts degree in 1982.

== Career ==
=== Fiction ===
During his high school years, he collaborated on comics with his schoolmate Kurt Busiek, who has become a successful comics writer. While still teenagers, the two along with fellow teenagers Christopher Bing, a 2001 Caldecott Medal winner, and Richard Howell created the first licensed Marvel/DC crossover comic Pow! Biff! Pops!, a one-shot project sold in conjunction with a 1978 Boston Pops performance of comics-themed music.

While working as a production artist at DC Comics, McCloud created the light-hearted science fiction/superhero comic book series Zot! in 1984, in part as a reaction to the increasingly grim direction that superhero comics were taking in the 1980s. His other print comics include the 1986 black and white comic Destroy!! (a deliberately over-the-top, oversized single-issue comic book, intended as a parody of formulaic superhero fights), the 1998 graphic novel The New Adventures of Abraham Lincoln (done with a mixture of computer-generated and manually drawn digital images), 12 issues of DC Comics' Superman Adventures in the late 1990s, the 2005 three-issue series Superman: Strength, and the 2015 graphic novel The Sculptor.

In April 2025, McCloud and Raina Telgemeier released The Cartoonists Club, a middle-grade graphic novel published by Scholastic's Graphix imprint. The book blends a fictional narrative about a group of students with educational sequences that adapt McCloud's theories from Understanding Comics for a younger audience.

=== Creator's Bill of Rights ===
McCloud was the principal author of the Creator's Bill of Rights, a 1988 document with the stated aim of protecting the rights of comic book creators and helping aid against the exploitation of comic artists and writers by corporate work-for-hire practices. The group which adopted the Bill included artists Kevin Eastman, Dave Sim, and Stephen R. Bissette. The Bill includes twelve rights; two of them are "The right to full ownership of what we fully create," and "The right to prompt payment of a fair and equitable share of profits derived from all of our creative work."

=== 24-hour comic ===
In 1990, McCloud coined the idea of a 24-hour comic: a complete 24-page comic created by a single cartoonist in 24 consecutive hours. It was a mutual challenge with cartoonist Steve Bissette, intended to compel creative output with a minimum of self-restraining contemplation. Thousands of cartoonists have since taken up the challenge, including Neil Gaiman; Kevin Eastman, co-creator of Teenage Mutant Ninja Turtles; Dave Sim, who published some of his work from this challenge in Cerebus the Aardvark; and Rick Veitch, who used it as a springboard for his comic Rarebit Fiends.

=== Non-fiction about comics ===
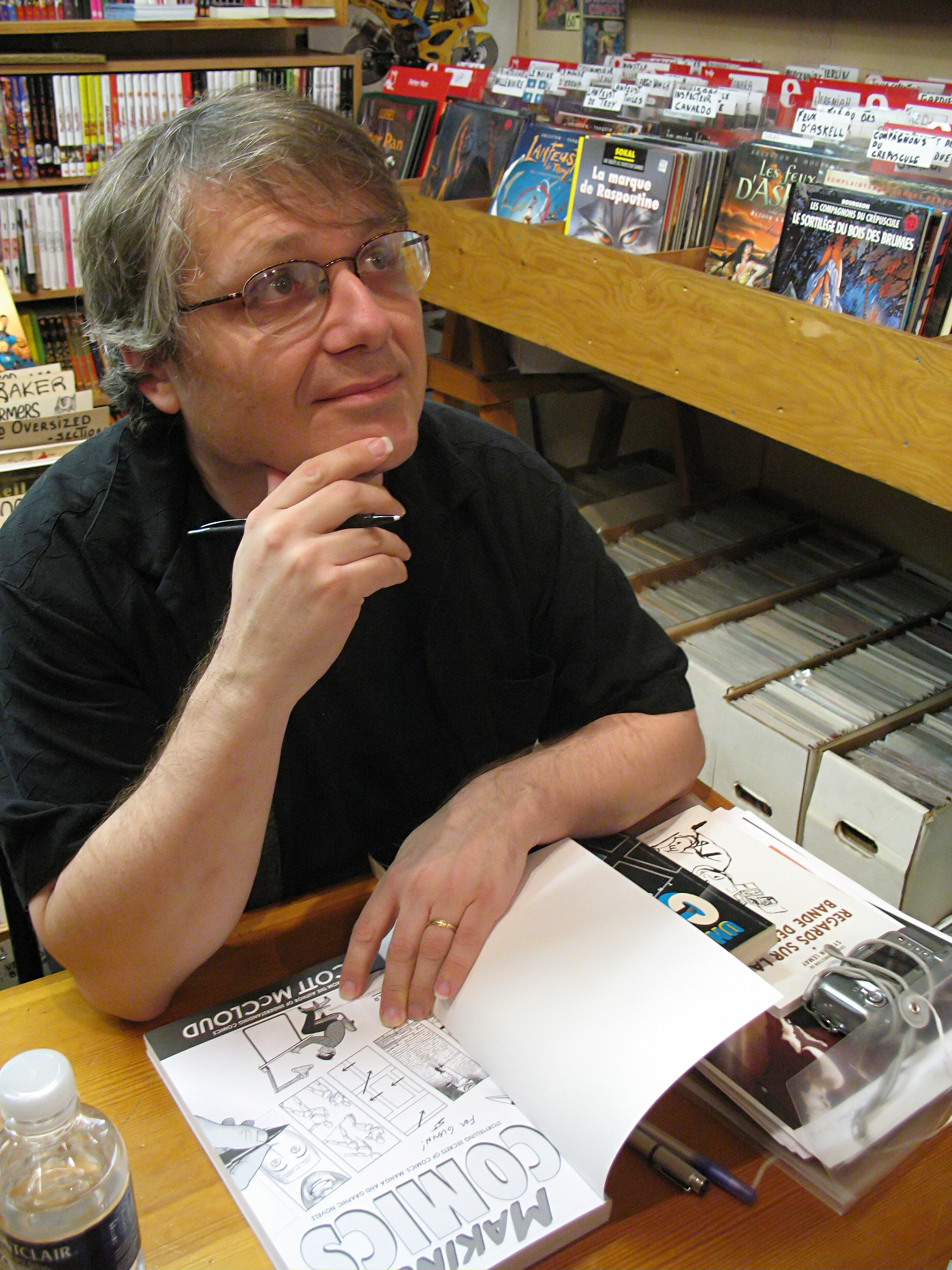
McCloud signing his book Making Comics in Montreal, December 2006

In the early 1990s, McCloud began creating a series of three books about the medium and business of comics, presented in comic form. The first one was Understanding Comics: The Invisible Art, published in 1993 and which established him as a popular comics theorist, described as the "Aristotle of comics" and the "Marshall McLuhan of comics". The book was a wide-ranging exploration of the definition, history, vocabulary, and methods of the medium of comics; it is widely cited in academic discussions of the medium.

In 2000, McCloud published Reinventing Comics: How Imagination and Technology Are Revolutionizing an Art Form, in which he outlined twelve "revolutions" taking place, that he argued would be keys to the growth and success of comics as a popular and creative medium. He returned to focus on the medium itself in 2006 with Making Comics: Storytelling Secrets of Comics, Manga, and Graphic Novels, an instructional guide to the process of producing comics, which he followed with a promotional lecture tour (with his family) of all 50 U.S. states, some stops in Canada, and parts of Europe.

In November 2022, McCloud was working on a third draft of layouts for an upcoming book on visual communication. He has described the book as "a preposterously ambitious full color project covering the evolution and biology of vision, principles of visual perception, demonstrations of how visual elements behave in the mind's eye; best practices for clarity, explanation, and effective rhetoric; and some personal reflections on [my] family's experiences with blindness."

=== Technology ===
Beginning in the late 1990s, McCloud was an early advocate of micropayments. He was an adviser to BitPass, a company which provided an online micropayment system. He helped launch it with the publication of The Right Number, an online graphic novella priced at a quarter for each chapter.

Additionally, McCloud also has stated his belief that each medium of art lean into its own strengths and advantages, rather than borrow too much from other mediums' specialties. He makes reference to this when talking about Scott Pilgrim and Watchmen, saying that they ended up pulling too much from alternate artistic mediums- comics and animation respectively- and ended up losing retention because of it.

Among the techniques he explores is the "infinite canvas" permitted by a web browser, allowing panels to be spatially arranged in ways not possible in the finite, two-dimensional, paged format of a physical book. Google commissioned him in 2008 to create a comic serving as the press release introducing their Chrome web browser.

== Personal life ==
McCloud lives in Newbury Park, California southeast of Camarillo. In 1978, during his first year of college, he met his future wife Ivy. He fell in love with her over the following year but kept it a secret until he confessed to her in December 1986. They got married in January 1988.

McCloud described Ivy as being his "muse", using her as inspiration for characters (one notable example being the character Meg in his graphic novel The Sculptor). They had two daughters together, Sky and Winter McCloud. In April 2022, Ivy died in a car accident at 61 years old.

== Awards ==
- 1985 Jack Kirby Award for Best New Series for Zot!
- 1985 Russ Manning Most Promising Newcomer Award for Zot!
- 1994 Eisner Award for Best Comics-Related Book for Understanding Comics
- 1994 Harvey Award for Best Writer for Understanding Comics
- 1994 Harvey Award for Best Graphic Album/Original Material for Understanding Comics
- 1994 Harvey Award for Best Biographical, Historical or Journalistic Presentation for Understanding Comics
- 2001 Harvey Award for Best Biographical/Historical Presentation for Reinventing Comics
- 2007 Eagle Award for Favourite Comics-Related Book for Making Comics
- 2007 Quill Award for Best Graphic Novel for Making Comics
- 2021 Eisner Hall of Fame inductee
- 2026 Eisner Award for Best Publication for Kids for The Cartoonists Club (with Raina Telgemeier).

=== Nominations ===
- 1988 Harvey Award for Best Cartoonist for Zot!
- 1988 Eisner Award for Best Single Issue for Zot! #14
- 1988 Eisner Award for Best Continuing Series for Zot!
- 1988 Eisner Award for Best Black-and-White Series for Zot!
- 1988 Eisner Award for Best Writer/Artist for Zot!
- 1991 Harvey Award for Best Writer for Zot!
- 1991 Harvey Award for Best Single Issue or Story for Zot! #33
- 1991 Eisner Award for Best Story or Single Issue for Zot! #33
- 1991 Eisner Award for Best Continuing Series for Zot!
- 1991 Eisner Award for Best Black-and-White Series for Zot!
- 1991 Eisner Award for Best Writer for Zot!
- 1992 Harvey Award for Best Single Issue or Story for Zot! #35
- 1993 Harvey Award for Best Biographical, Historical or Journalistic Presentation for Understanding Comics: The Slideshow!
- 1994 Hugo Award for Best Related Non-Fiction Book for Understanding Comics
- 1998 Eisner Award for Best Single Issue for Superman Adventures #3 ("Distant Thunder"; with Rick Burchett and Terry Austin)
- 1998 Eisner Award for Best Serialized Story for Superman Adventures #11–12 ("The War Within"; with Rick Burchett and Terry Austin)
- 1998 Eisner Award for Best Writer for Superman Adventures
- 2007 Harvey Award for Best Biographical, Historical or Journalistic Presentation for Making Comics

== Bibliography ==
- Zot!
  - The Original Zot!: Book One (issues 1-4) (Eclipse Books, 1990) ISBN 978-0-913035-04-7
  - Zot!: Book 1 (issues 1-10) (Kitchen Sink Press, 1997) ISBN 978-0-87816-525-4
  - Zot!: Book 2 (issues 11–15 and 17–18) (Kitchen Sink Press, 1998) ISBN 978-0-87816-428-8
  - Zot!: Book 3 (issues 16 and 21-27) (Kitchen Sink Press, 1998) ISBN 978-0-87816-429-5
  - Zot!: The Complete Black and White Collection: 1987–1991 (issues 11-36, with 19 and 20 in layout form only) (Harper Paperbacks, 2008) ISBN 0-06-153727-6
- Understanding Comics: The Invisible Art (1993, ISBN 0-613-02782-5)
- Reinventing Comics: How Imagination and Technology Are Revolutionizing an Art Form (2000, ISBN 0-06-095350-0)
- Making Comics: Storytelling Secrets of Comics, Manga and Graphic Novels (2006, ISBN 0-06-078094-0)
- The New Adventures of Abraham Lincoln (Image Comics, 1998) ISBN 978-1-887279-87-1
- 24 Hour Comics (editor) (About Comics, 2004) ISBN 978-0-9716338-4-1
- Destroy!! (Oversized Edition) (Eclipse Books, 1986)
- The Sculptor (First Second, 2015) 978-1-59643-573-5
- Superman Adventures #2-13 (DC Comics, 1997)
- Justice League Adventures #16 (DC Comics, 2003)
- Superman: Strength #1-3 (DC Comics, 2005)
- Google Chrome (2008)
- Best American Comics 2014 (editor) (Houghton Mifflin Harcourt, 2014-09-05)
- The Cartoonists Club (with Raina Telgemeier) (Graphix, 2025) ISBN 978-1338777215

== Typography ==
Various fonts used in Scott McCloud's comics have been recreated digitally, and have been released by Comicraft:

- Scott McCloud/McComicBookFont is the font used in Making Comics: Storytelling Secrets of Comics, Manga and Graphic Novels. The family includes 4 weights (Regular, Bold, Semi Bold, Extra Bold).
- The Sculptor is designed by John ’JG’ Roshell of Comicraft, it is based on the font used in The Sculptor. The family includes 3 weights (Regular, Bold, Heavy).
- Digital Delivery is designed by John ’JG’ Roshell of Comicraft, it is based on the font used in Reinventing Comics: How Imagination and Technology Are Revolutionizing an Art Form. The family includes 5 fonts in 2 weights (Regular, Bold) with complimentary italic, and a Display font.
