= BitPass =

American company

Bitpass, Inc.
- Type: Private
- Industry: Consumer Internet, Digital content, Online payments
- Founded: 2002; 24 years ago in Mountain View, California, United States
- Defunct: January 26, 2007
- Headquarters: San Mateo, California, United States
- Key people: Kurt Huang, Founder; Gyuchang Jun, Founder, CTO; Doug Knopper, CEO
- Products: Bitpass buyer account, Bitpass Professional merchant account, Bitpass Studio merchant account
- Revenue: undisclosed
- Number of employees: undisclosed
- Website: www.bitpass.com

BitPass was an American company that, from 2002-2007, developed an online payment system for digital content and services including micropayments. It was founded in 2002 by Kurt Huang and Gyuchang Jun. One of its best-known projects was the Mperia online music store catering to unsigned artists. The company shut down in 2007.

== History ==
Kurt Huang and Gyuchang Jun founded BitPass. Michael O'Donnell was brought on as CEO in 2004, but left in April 2005, and was replaced by Doug Knopper in November 2005.

The idea for the company dated back to 1999 but the company officially incorporated in 2002. $1.5 million in joint venture funding was led by Garage Technology Ventures. The first test version of the product was launched in June 2003. In late 2004, a second funding round of $11.75 million was announced.

For the content buyer, Bitpass worked like a pre-paid telephone card: the buyer signed up for the service and put money into an account using a credit card or PayPal. This stored-value amount could be used to purchase digital content or services. Transaction fees were paid by the content provider. For payments under $5, the charge was 15% of the price paid by the buyer (Bitpass Professional merchant account fee). BitPass also partnered with major technology and financial services companies such as Microsoft, PayPal, the Royal Bank of Scotland and First Data.

On January 19, 2007 Bitpass announced that they were shutting down, and operations officially closed on January 26, 2007.

== Mperia ==

Mperia was an online music store founded in 2003 by BitPass to use the BitPass payment system. Launched by Huang and Joshua Ellis, it was aimed toward allowing independent musicians to sell their music online. Artists could upload their own music directly, and could price their own music, with tracking costing between US$0.25 and US$1.50. No digital rights management features were permitted. Artists kept 70% of each track's revenue.

In 2004, Mperia partnered with CD Baby to sell tracks from CDBaby's catalog.

With the shutdown of BitPass, Mperia also shut down in early 2007.
