= Reinventing Comics =

Comic book by Scott McCloud

- Author: Scott McCloud
- Cover artist: Scott McCloud
- Language: English
- Subject: Comics
- Publisher: Paradox Press
- Publication date: 2000
- Publication place: U.S.
- Media type: Paperback
- Pages: 250
- ISBN: 0-06-095350-0
- OCLC: 44654496
- Preceded by: Understanding Comics
- Followed by: Making Comics

Reinventing Comics: How Imagination and Technology Are Revolutionizing an Art Form (2000) is a book written by comic book writer and artist Scott McCloud. It is a thematic sequel to his critically acclaimed Understanding Comics, and was followed by Making Comics.

== Publication history ==
Reinventing Comics was released in 2000 in separate editions published by Paradox Press and William Morrow Paperbacks. Paradox Press, formerly an imprint of DC Comics, is now defunct, and William Morrow is now a division of HarperCollins, so subsequent printings of the book have been released by HarperCollins.

== Summary ==
Reinventing Comics explains twelve "revolutions" that McCloud predicts are necessary for the comic book to survive as a medium:

- "comics as literature"
- "comics as art"
- "creators' rights"
- "industry innovation"
- "public perception"
- "institutional scrutiny"
- "gender balance"
- "minority representation"
- "diversity of genre"
- "digital production"
- "digital delivery"
- "digital comics"

The book caused considerable controversy in the comics industry, McCloud famously noting that it had been described as "dangerous".

As promised in the book, McCloud has offered annotations, addenda and his further-developing thoughts about the future of comics on his website. In particular, he considered his 2000–2001 webcomic, I Can't Stop Thinking, to be a continuation of Reinventing Comics, though he has continued to write about the future of comics in many different forms, as he acknowledges Reinventing Comics is "a product of its time".

== Development ==
McCloud drew Reinventing Comics digitally, using a small Wacom tablet. Because of the low power of the machine he was using, McCloud had a difficult time working on the book. In an interview with Joe Zabel, McCloud stated that he was so eager to get to the second half of the book that he rushed through the first portion.

A revised version of Reinventing Comics was released in 2009. Here, McCloud cited various successful webcomics that pushed the envelope, such as Daniel Merlin Goodbrey's work with the "Tarquin Engine" and Drew Weing's Pup Contemplates the Heat Death of the Universe.

== See also ==
- Comics studies – academic study of comics and graphic novels
