= Understanding Comics =

1993 non-fiction comic book by Scott McCloud

Understanding Comics: The Invisible Art
- Cover of the original Tundra Publishing edition of Understanding Comics: The Invisible Art
- Editor: Mark Martin
- Author: Scott McCloud
- Language: English
- Subject: Comics
- Publication date: 1993
- Publication place: United States
- Pages: 215
- Followed by: Reinventing Comics

Understanding Comics: The Invisible Art is a 1993 non-fiction work of comics by American cartoonist Scott McCloud. It explores formal aspects of comics, the historical development of the medium, its fundamental vocabulary, and various ways in which these elements have been used. It expounds theoretical ideas about comics as an art form and medium of communication, and is itself written in comic book form.

Understanding Comics received praise from notable comic and graphic novel authors such as Art Spiegelman, Will Eisner, Alan Moore, Neil Gaiman, and Garry Trudeau (who reviewed the book for The New York Times). Although the book has prompted debate over many of McCloud's conclusions, its discussions of "iconic" art and the concept of "closure" between panels have become common reference points in discussions of the medium.

The title of Understanding Comics is an homage to Marshall McLuhan's seminal 1964 work Understanding Media.

== Publication history ==
Excerpts from Understanding Comics were published in Amazing Heroes #200 (Apr. 1992); that issue later won the 1992 Don Thompson Award for Best Non-Fiction Work. McCloud previewed the book at the August 1992 Comics Arts Conference.

Understanding Comics was first published by Tundra Publishing; reprintings have been released by Kitchen Sink Press, DC Comics' Paradox Press, DC's Vertigo line, and HarperPerennial. The book was edited by Mark Martin, with lettering by Bob Lappan.

=== Editions ===
==== Softcover ====
- Tundra (1993): ISBN 1-56862-019-5
- Kitchen Sink (Jan. 1993): ISBN 0-87816-243-7
- William Morrow and Company (April 1994): ISBN 0-06-097625-X
- Paradox Press/DC (May 1999): ISBN 1-56389-557-9
- HarperPerennial (2004)

==== Hardcover ====
- Kitchen Sink (Aug. 1993): ISBN 0-87816-244-5
- Vertigo/DC Comics (2000): ISBN 1-56389-759-8

=== Sequels ===
McCloud has followed up Understanding Comics with Reinventing Comics (2000), in which he suggested ways for the medium to change and grow; and Making Comics (2006), a study of methods of constructing comics.

== Summary ==
Understanding Comics is a wide-ranging exploration of the definition, history, vocabulary, and methods of the medium of comics. An attempt to formalize the study of comics, it is itself in comics form.

The book's overarching argument is that comics are defined by the primacy of sequences of images. McCloud also introduced the concept of "closure" to refer to a reader's role in closing narrative gaps between comics panels. The book argues that comics employ nonlinear narratives because they rely on the reader's choices and interactions.

The book begins with a discussion of the concept of visual literacy and a history of narrative in visual media. McCloud mentions, among other early works of graphic narrative, the Bayeux Tapestry, as an antecedent to comics. Understanding Comics posits Swiss caricaturist Rodolphe Töpffer as in many ways "the father of the modern comic". McCloud emphasizes Töpffer's use of "cartooning and panel borders" along with "the first interdependent combination of words and pictures seen in Europe".

McCloud also highlights the differences between iconic and realistic figures. Iconic figures can be compared to a standard cartoon, while realistic figures focus more on photo-quality in terms of detail. He states that Western culture is captivated by iconic images more so due to their simplicity. He provides a full comparison and breakdown of iconic and realistic images and gives an explanation of his reasoning behind this statement.

One of the book's key concepts is that of "masking", a visual style, dramatic convention, and literary technique described in the chapter on realism. It is the use of simplistic, archetypal, narrative characters, even if juxtaposed with detailed, photographic, verisimilar, spectacular backgrounds. This may function, McCloud infers, as a mask, a form of projective identification. His explanation is that a familiar and minimally detailed character allows for a stronger emotional connection and for viewers to identify more easily.

One of the book's concepts is "The Big Triangle", a tool for thinking about different styles of comics art. McCloud places the realistic representation in the bottom left corner, with iconic representation, or cartoony art, in the bottom right, and a third identifier, abstraction of image, at the apex of the triangle. This allows placement and grouping of artists by triangulation.

== Awards and honors ==
Understanding Comics won multiple Harvey Awards in 1994 for Best Graphic Album/Original Material and Best Biographical, Historical or Journalistic Presentation. In addition, McCloud won the 1994 Harvey Award for Best Writer.

Understanding Comics won the 1994 Eisner Award for Best Comics-Related Book.

Author McCloud won the 1994 Adamson Award for Best International Comic-Strip [or comic book] Cartoonist. The book was a finalist for the 1994 Hugo Award for Best Non-Fiction Book.

The Swedish translation of the book, Serier: Den Osynliga Konsten, published in 1995 by RSR Epix, was awarded the 1996 Urhunden Prize.

The French translation of the book, titled L'Art invisible and published by Vertige Graphic, won the Prix Bloody Mary at the 2000 Angoulême International Comics Festival. In addition, it was nominated for that year's Angoulême International Comics Festival Prize for Best Album.

== Legacy ==
Along with Will Eisner's Comics and Sequential Art, Understanding Comics is considered to form the foundations for formal comics studies in English.

The book was called "one of the most insightful books about designing graphic user interfaces ever written" by Apple Macintosh co-creator Andy Hertzfeld.

Understanding Comics has received some criticism for its emphasis on control over experimentation when it comes to the artistic process. In a short comic titled Alchemy and Control, cartoonist Caitlin Cass contrasts McCloud's approach with other comic artists such as Lynda Barry and Charles Schulz.

== Parodies ==
Understanding Comics was parodied by Dylan Sisson in his Filibusting Comics: The Next Chapter, published by Fantagraphics in 1995, and later translated into Spanish.

It was parodied again, in Tim Heiderich and Mike Rosen's Misunderstanding Comics, self-published via Kickstarter in 2012.

== See also ==
- Comics and Sequential Art, earlier book by Will Eisner on the same subject
- Comics studies – academic study of comics and graphic novels
- "How to Read Nancy", essay on the comic strip by Mark Newgarden and Paul Karasik
- Masking – visual style used in comics
- Sequential art – sequence of images used for storytelling
