= Rick Burchett =

American comic book artist (born 1952)

- Born: Richard Burchett; March 9, 1952 (age 74)
- Areas: Writer, Penciller, Inker
- Notable works: The Batman Adventures; Blackhawk
- Awards: Eisner Award, 1996, 1999

Rick Burchett (born March 9, 1952) is an American comic book artist known for his work on such characters as Batman and Superman.

== Career ==
Burchett began his artistic career in St. Louis, Missouri, and did his early professional comics work at First Comics, Pacific Comics, Capital Comics, and AC Comics; on titles including Black Diamond, E-Man, American Flagg!, Great American Western, and The Phantom. Moving to DC Comics (as well as the DC imprints Impact Comics and Vertigo), Burchett's first work for the company was on Blackhawk, followed by titles like Batman, The Flash, Superman, Black Hood, Wonder Woman, The Justice League, and Green Lantern.

Around 1985, Burchett and artist Don Secrease met a young aspiring artist and fellow St. Louis citizen named Jim Lee, and convinced him that he needed to show his portfolio to editors in person, prompting Lee's decision to attend a New York comics convention, where he met editor Archie Goodwin.

Burchett received the Eisner Award in 1996 with Paul Dini and Ty Templeton for his work on The Batman and Robin Adventures. He shared the Eisner Award again in 1999, with Templeton and Terry Beatty, for his work on Batman: The Gotham Adventures.

In 2006 he became the ongoing penciller on Marvel Comics' She-Hulk with writer and former Batman Adventures collaborator Dan Slott. As of 2011, he is the artist for The All-New Batman: The Brave and the Bold, the comic book tie-in to the Batman: The Brave and the Bold animated television series. Also in 2011, Burchett became the artist for the ongoing webcomic Lady Sabre and the Pirates of the Ineffable Aether, written by Greg Rucka. In 2017, he rejoined Ty Templeton in creating a new DC digital comic, Harley Quinn and Batman.

In 2017 Burchett replaced Chuck Ayers as the penciller on the syndicated comic strip Funky Winkerbean, debuting with the May 25 installment.

== Personal life ==
Burchett continues to live in the St. Louis area.
