= Glossary of comics terminology =

Comics has developed specialized terminology. Several attempts have been made to formalize and define the terminology of comics by authors such as Will Eisner, Scott McCloud, R. C. Harvey and Dylan Horrocks. Much of the terminology in English is under dispute, so this page will list and describe the most common terms used in comics.

== Comics ==
"Comics" is used as a non-count noun, and thus is used with the singular form of a verb, in the way the words "politics" or "economics" are, to refer to the medium, so that one refers to the "comics industry" rather than the "comic industry". "Comic" as an adjective also has the meaning of "funny", or as pertaining to comedians, which can cause confusion and is usually avoided in most cases ("comic strip" being a well-entrenched exception).

"Comic" as a singular noun is sometimes used to refer to individual comics periodicals, particularly in the United Kingdom and Ireland, which in North America would be known as "comic books".

"Underground comix" is a term first popularized by cartoonists in the underground comix movement of the 1960s and 1970s in an attempt to move the word away from its etymological origins. Art Spiegelman in particular has been a proponent of its usage, hoping to highlight the fact that the medium is capable of mature, non-comedic content, as well as to emphasize the hybrid nature of the medium ("co-mix").

"Alternative comics" is a term covering a range of American comics that have appeared since the 1980s, following the comix movement of the late 1960s/early 1970s.

Other terms used as synonyms for "comics" are "sequential art" (a term coined and popularized by Will Eisner), "graphic storytelling", and "graphic novel" (which is normally used to denote book-form comics, although this usage is not consistent).

== Layout ==
=== Panel ===
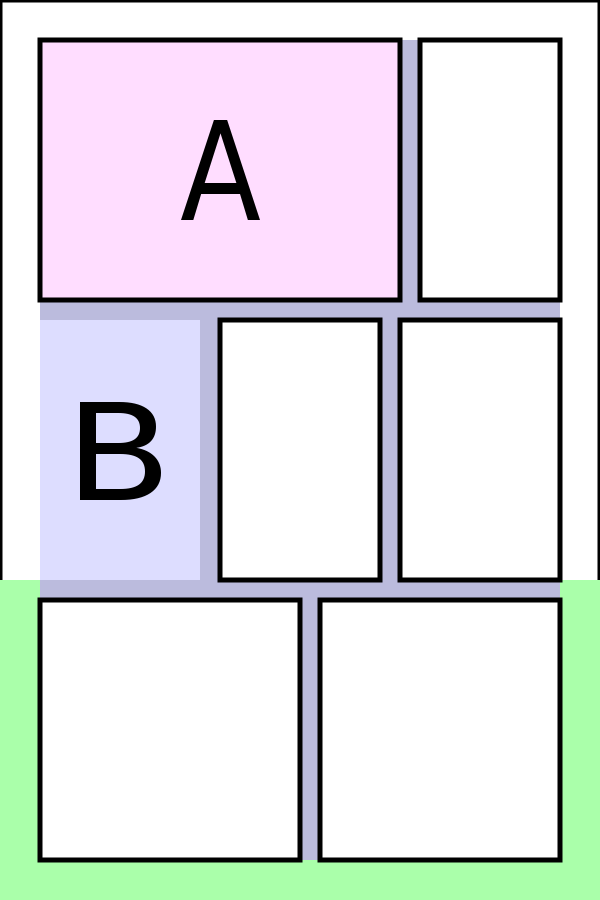
A typical comics page layout. A is a panel B is a borderless panel are the gutters is a tier

A panel (alternatively known as frame or box) is one drawing on a page, and contains a segment of action. A page may have one or many panels, and panels are frequently, but not always, surrounded by a border or outline, whose shape can be altered to indicate emotion, tension or flashback sequences. The size, shape and style of a panel, as well as the placement of figures and speech balloons inside it, affect the timing or pacing of a story. Panels are used to break up and encapsulate sequences of events in a narrative. What occurs in a panel may be asynchronous, meaning that not everything that occurs in a single panel necessarily occurs at one time.

=== Gutter ===
The gutter is the space between panels. Vertical gutters can be made thinner than horizontal gutters in order to encourage the reader to group each row of panels for easier reading.

=== Tier ===
A tier (/tɪər/) is a singular row of panels.

=== Splash ===
A splash or splash page is a large, often full-page illustration which opens and introduces a story. Often designed as a decorative unit, its purpose is to capture the reader's attention and can be used to establish time, place and mood.

=== Spread ===
A spread is an image that spans more than one page. The two-page spread or double-page spread is the most common, but there are spreads that span more pages, often by making use of a foldout (or gatefold).

== Elements ==
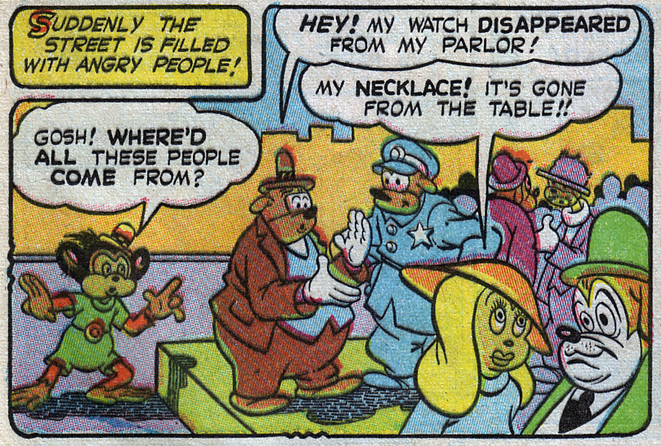
A caption (the yellow box) gives the narrator a voice. The characters' dialogue is given through speech balloons. The character speaking is indicated by the tail of the balloon.

=== Word balloon ===
A speech/word/dialogue balloon (or bubble) is a speech indicator, containing the characters' dialogue. The indicator from the balloon that points at the speaker is called a pointer or tail.

The word balloon bridges the gap between word and image—"the word made image", as expressed by Pierre Fresnault-Druelle. In early renderings, word balloons were no more than ribbons emanating from their speakers' mouths, but as they evolved and became more sophisticated, they became a more expressive device. Its shape came to convey meaning as well.

=== Thought balloon ===
A thought balloon expresses a character's unvoiced thoughts and is usually shaped like a cloud, with bubbles as a pointer. Emotions can be expressed by the shape of the balloon—spiked balloons can indicate shouting, and "dripping" balloons can indicate sarcasm.

=== Caption ===
In a caption, words appear in a box separated from the rest of the panel or page, usually to give voice to a narrator, but sometimes used for the characters' thoughts or dialogue. In some comics, where speech balloons are not used, the captions provide the reader with text about what is happening in the images. This tradition is known as "text comics".

=== Sound effects ===
Sound effects or onomatopoeia are words without bubbles that mimic sounds. They are non-vocal sound images, from the subtle to the forceful, such as 'ding-ding' for a bell, to "WHAM" for an impact.

== Concepts ==
=== Closure ===
The reader performs closure by using background knowledge and an understanding of panel relations to combine panels mentally into events.

=== Encapsulation ===
Encapsulation is the capturing of prime moments in a story. Not every moment of a story is presented in comics. For the artist, encapsulation involves choosing what will be presented in which panels, how many panels will be used to present the action, and the size and layout of the panels. The layouts of the panels can influence the way the panels interact with each other to the reader. This interaction can lend more meaning to the panels than what they have individually. Encapsulation is distinctive to comics, and an essential consideration in the creation of a work of comics.

== Division of labour ==
Sometimes all aspects of a comics production down to the drawing, writing and editing are done by a single person; in such cases the term comic book creator (also comics writer/artist, comics creator or comics maker) is employed (occasionally the term graphic novelist is also employed). The sophisticated term graphic narrator (also graphic storyteller) is also found in the academic literature on art education.

At the other extreme, the labour behind the comics creation is sometimes divided up into different specialties.

=== Cartoonist ===
The cartoonist is the person who writes as well as does most or all of the art duties. A cartoonist may create cartoons (individual images) or comics (sequential images).

=== Writer ===
Also sometimes called scripter, plotter or author, the writer scripts the work—scripting may include plot, dialogue and action—in a way that the artist (or artists) can interpret the story into visuals for the reader. Writers can communicate their stories in varying amounts of detail to the artist(s) and in a number of ways, including verbally, by script or by thumbnail layout.

=== Artist ===
The artist or illustrator is the person who handles the visuals. This job may be broken down further into:

==== Penciller ====
The penciller or penciler lays down the basic artwork for a page, deciding on panel placement and the placement of figures and settings in the panels, the backgrounds and the characters' facial expressions and poses.

==== Inker ====
An inker or finisher "finishes" and sometimes enhances, the pencilled artwork using ink (traditionally India ink) and a pen or brush to create a high-contrast image for photographing and printing. The extent of the inker's job varies depending on how tight the penciller's work is, but nonetheless requires the skill of an artist, and is more or less active depending on the completeness of the pencils provided.

==== Colourist ====
The colourist or colorist adds colours to copies of the finished artwork, which can have an effect on mood and meaning. Colourists can work with a variety of media, such as rubylith, paints, and computers. Digital colorists may employ a flatter to assist them.

=== Letterer ===
Normally separate from the writer, the letterer is the person who fills (and possibly places) speech balloons and captions with the dialogue and other words meant to be read. Letterers may also provide the lettering for sound, although this is often done by the artist even when a letterer is present. In the West, comics have traditionally been hand-lettered, although computer typesetting has become increasingly common. The manner in which the letterer letters the text influences how the message is interpreted by the reader, and the letterer can suggest the paralanguage of dialogue by varying the weight, size and shape of the lettering.

== Formats ==
=== Comic strip ===
A comic strip is a short work of comics which has its origins in the world of newspapers, but may also appear in magazines or other periodicals, as well as in books. In comic strips, generally the only unit of encapsulation is the panel.

==== Dailies ====
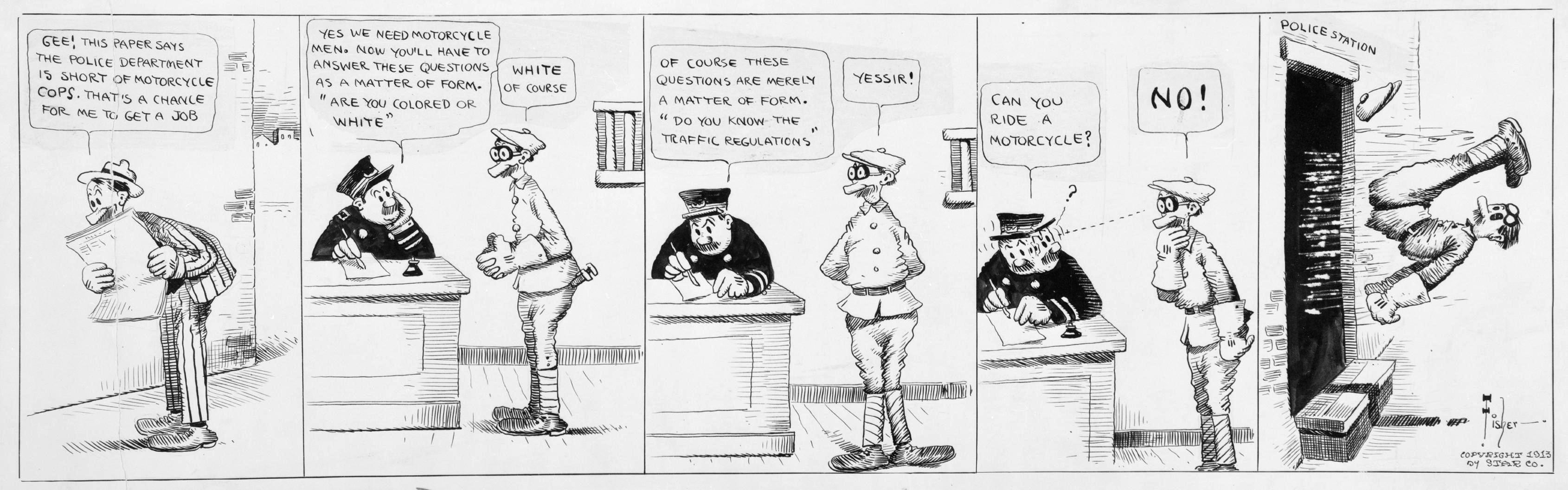
Mutt and Jeff daily comic strip (1913)

As the name implies, a daily comic strip is a comic strip that is normally run six days a week in a newspaper, historically in black and white, although colour examples have become common. They normally run every day in a week but one (usually Sunday), in which the strip (the so-called Sunday strip) appears larger and usually in colour.

Several daily strips are short and limited to one tier ("single-tiered").

==== Sundays ====
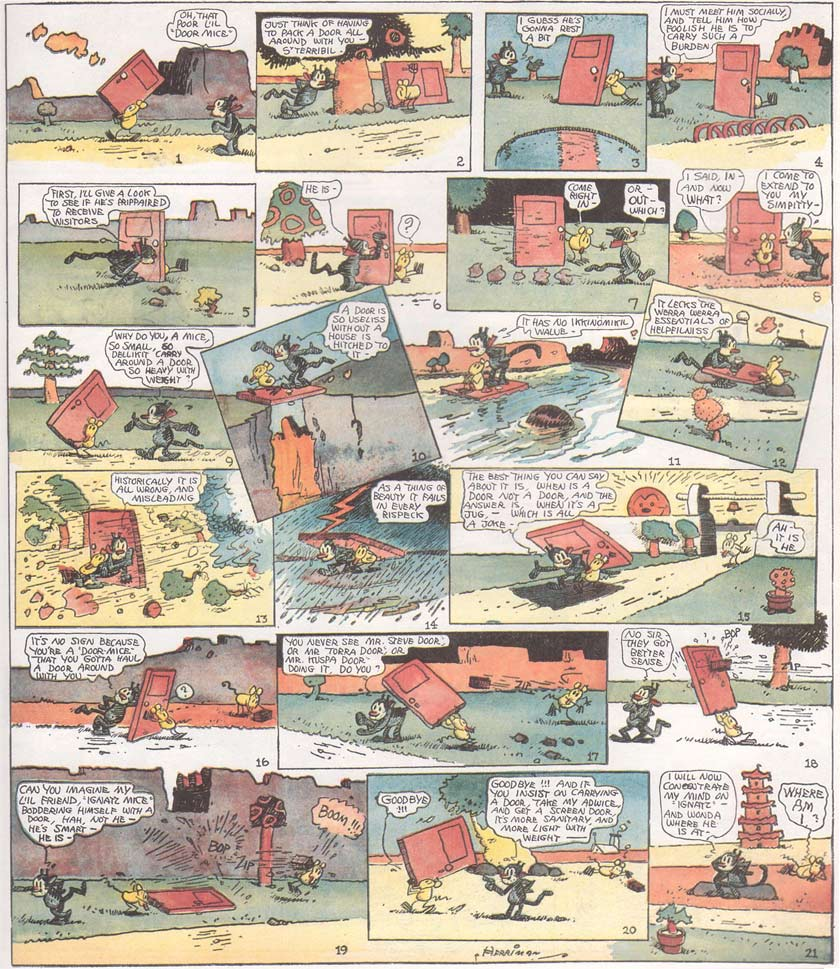
Full-page Krazy Kat Sunday comic strip (1922)

Sunday comics are comic strips that traditionally run in newspapers on Sundays (Saturdays in some papers), frequently in full colour. Before World War II, cartoonists normally were given an entire page to themselves, and often would devote the page to a single comic strip, although many would divide the page between a main strip and a "topper" (which would sometimes run on the bottom). Wartime paper shortages brought down the size of strips, and to this day Sunday pages normally are made up of a multitude of strips.

=== Gag and editorial cartoons ===
Gag cartoons and editorial cartoons are usually single-panel comics.

A gag cartoon (a.k.a. panel cartoon or gag panel) is most often a single-panel cartoon, usually including a hand-lettered or typeset caption beneath the drawing. A pantomime cartoon carries no caption. In some cases, dialogue may appear in speech balloons, following the common convention of comic strips. As the name implies—"gag" being a show-business term for a comedic idea—these cartoons are most often intended to provoke laughter.

An editorial cartoon or political cartoon is most often a single-panel comic that contain some level of political or social commentary. Such cartoons are used to convey and question an aspect of daily news or current affairs in a national or international context. Political cartoons generally feature a caricaturist style of drawing, to capture the likeness of a politician or subject. Political cartoonists may also employ humor or satire to ridicule an individual or group, emphasize their point of view, or comment on a particular event. The traditional and most common outlet for political cartoons is the editorial page of a newspaper, or in a pocket cartoon, in the front news section of a newspaper. Editorial cartoons are not usually found in the dedicated comic section, although certain cartoons or comic strips have achieved crossover status.

=== Comic book ===
A comic book, also known as a comic or floppy, is a periodical, normally thin in size and stapled together. Comic books have a greater variety of units of encapsulation than comic strips, including the panel, the page, the spread, and inset panels. They are also capable of more sophisticated layouts and compositions. A floppy comic is also known as an American comic book.

Comic books are typically published as either an ongoing series (a series that runs indefinitely), as a limited series (a series intended to end after a certain number of issues), or as a one shot (a comic book which is intended as a one-off publication). Some series will publish an annual issue once a year which is two to three times as large as a regular issue; "while they don't have to be one-shot stories, generally annuals are used as ways to tell stories that don't fit within a single issue or can't be included in a full arc".

==== Trade paperback ====
A trade paperback is a collection of stories originally published in comic books, reprinted in book format, usually presenting either a complete miniseries, a story arc from a single title, or a series of stories with an arc or common theme. The term may refer to either a paperback or a hardcover collection of comics. A trade paperback typically differs from a graphic novel in that a graphic novel is usually original material.

==== Graphic novel ====
Graphic novel is a term whose definition is hard to pin down, but usually refers to a self-contained, book-length form. Some would have its use restricted only to long-form narratives, while at the other extreme are people who use it as a synonym for "comics" or "comic book". Others again define it as a book with a square-bound spine, even if it is a collection of short strips. Still others have used the term to distance their work from the negative connotations the terms "comic" or "comic book" have for the public, or to give their work an elevated air. Other than in presentation and intent, they hardly differ from comic books.

Some prefer not to use the term "graphic novel" at all. Amongst the criticisms is the fact that the use of the word "novel" excludes non-novelistic genres, such as journalism, biography or history. Others believe the term has become too general, a catch-all for all kinds of content, and thus meaningless.

Towards the close of the 20th century, the three major comics-producing traditions—American, western European (especially the Franco-Belgian), and Japanese—converged in a trend towards book-length comics: the comic album in Europe, the tankōbon (Note: tankōbon (単行本; translation close to "independently appearing book")) in Japan, and the graphic novel in the English-speaking countries.

=== Webcomics ===
Webcomics, comics published via the Internet on the World Wide Web, have emerged since the beginning of the 21st century. As they are not limited by the size and shape of a physical page, they can make use of what Scott McCloud calls the infinite canvas, where the individual comics can make use of different sizes and dimensions. Webcomics are also capable of incorporating multimedia elements, such as sound, animation and bigger panels (scrolling panels). In South Korea, an infinite canvas format caught on called the webtoon. A slide show-like format for webcomics was described by French cartoonists Balak in 2010, which he dubbed Turbomedia.

== International comics ==
Comics of non-English origin are often referred to by the terms used in those comics' language of origin. The most widespread example is when fans of Japanese comics use the term manga, which is also applied to non-Japanese comics done in a Japanese style. One also sees bandes dessinées (BD) used to refer to Franco-Belgian comics, tebeos to refer to Spanish comics, manhwa and manhua to refer to Korean and Chinese comics respectively, and fumetti to refer to Italian comics (although this term is also used in English to refer to comics whose graphics are made using photographs rather than illustrations).

== See also ==
- Comics and Sequential Art
- Comics studies
- Graphic Storytelling and Visual Narrative
- The Lexicon of Comicana
- Manga iconography
- Reinventing Comics
- Understanding Comics
