= Graphic Storytelling and Visual Narrative =

1996 nonfiction book by Will Eisner

- Author: Will Eisner
- Illustrator: Will Eisner
- Language: English
- Subject: Comics
- Publisher: Poorhouse Press; North Light Books (2001 edition); W. W. Norton (2008 edition)
- Publication date: 1996; 2001; 2008
- Publication place: United States
- Pages: 164
- ISBN: 0-393-33127-X
- OCLC: 227191897
- Preceded by: Comics and Sequential Art
- Followed by: Expressive Anatomy for Comics and Narrative

Graphic Storytelling and Visual Narrative is a 1996 book by American cartoonist Will Eisner that provides a formal overview of comics. It is a companion to his earlier book Comics and Sequential Art (1985).

== See also ==
- Comics studies
- Sequential art
