= Comics =

Creative work in which pictures and text convey information

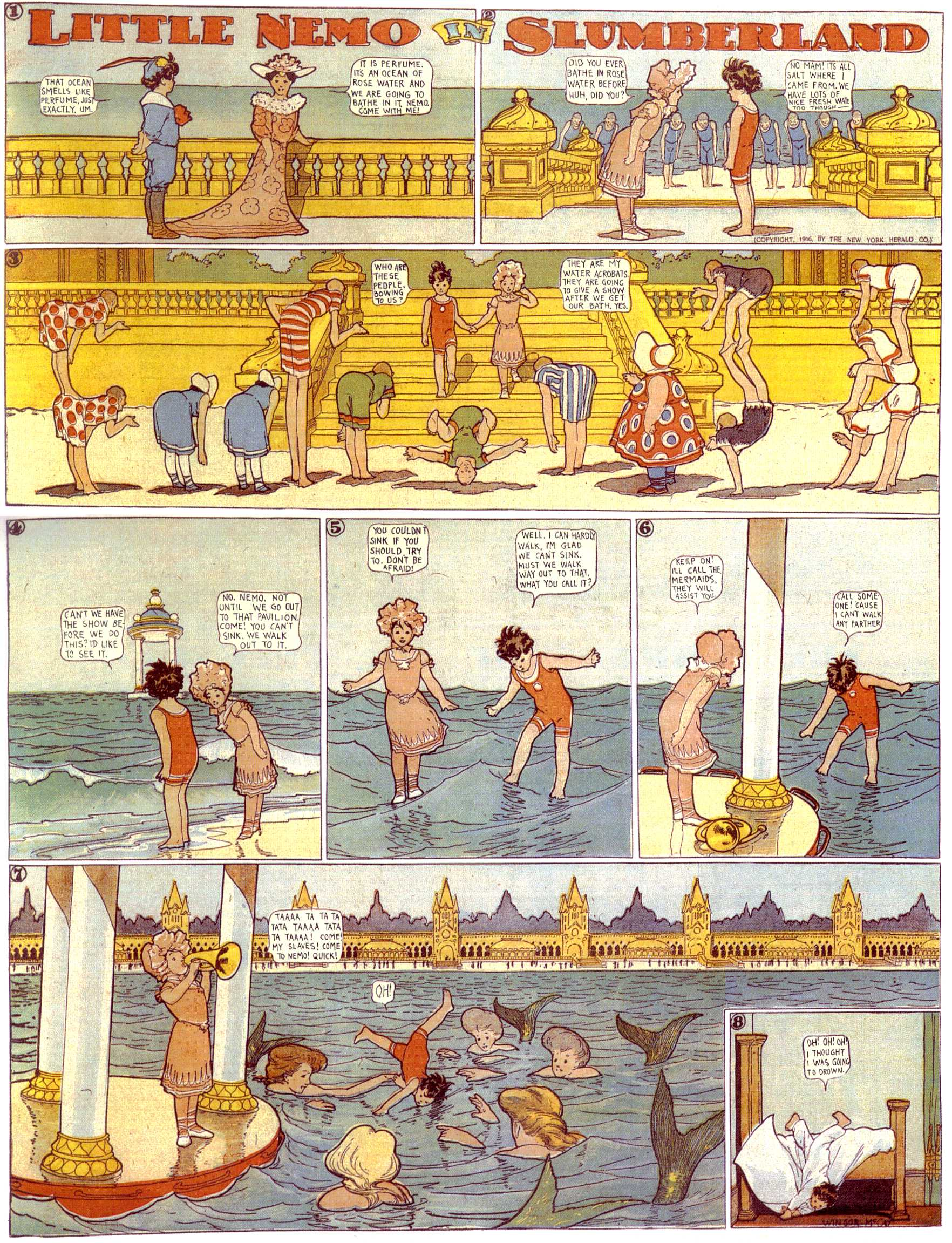
Little Nemo, Winsor McCay, 1906

Comics is a medium used to express ideas with images, often combined with text or other visual information. It typically takes the form of a sequence of panels of images. Textual devices such as speech balloons, captions, and onomatopoeia can indicate dialogue, narration, sound effects, or other information. There is no consensus among theorists and historians on a single definition of comics; some emphasize the combination of images and text, some sequentiality or other image relations, and others historical aspects such as mass reproduction or the use of recurring characters. Cartooning and other forms of illustration are the most common means of image-making in comics. Photo comics are a form that uses photographic images. Common forms include comic strips, editorial and gag cartoons, and comic books. Since the late 20th century, bound volumes such as graphic novels and comic albums have become increasingly common, along with webcomics.

The history of comics has followed different paths in different cultures. Scholars have posited a prehistory as far back as the Lascaux cave paintings. By the mid-20th century, comics flourished, particularly in the United States, Western Europe (especially France and Belgium), and Japan. The history of European comics is often traced to Rodolphe Töpffer's cartoon strips of the 1830s, while Max and Moritz by Wilhelm Busch also had a global impact from 1865 onwards. The medium became widely popular in the 1930s following the success of strips and books such as The Adventures of Tintin. American comics emerged as a mass medium in the early 20th century with the advent of newspaper comic strips; magazine-style comic books followed in the 1930s, and the superhero genre became prominent after Superman debuted in 1938. The history of Japanese comics, called manga, traces its origins to as early as the 12th century. Japanese comics are generally held separate from the evolution of Euro-American comics, with Western comic art most likely originating in 17th-century Italy. Modern Japanese comics emerged in the early 20th century, and the output of comic magazines and books rapidly expanded in the post-World War II era (1945–) with the popularity of cartoonists such as Osamu Tezuka. Comics had a lowbrow reputation for much of its history, but towards the end of the 20th century, the medium began to be respected as a serious art form as it found greater acceptance with the public and academics.

The English term comics is used as a singular noun when it refers to the medium itself (e.g. "Comics is a visual art form."), but as a plural when referring to works collectively (e.g. "Comics are popular reading material.").

== Origins and traditions ==
Examples of early comics

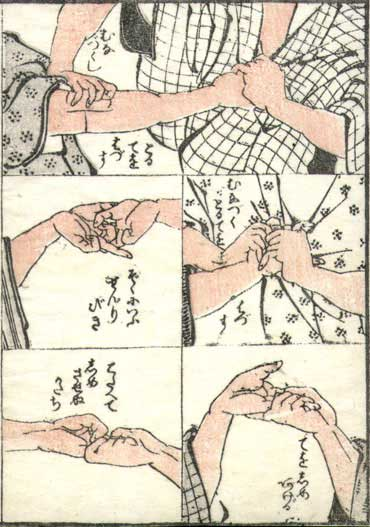
Manga,
Hokusai, early 19th century

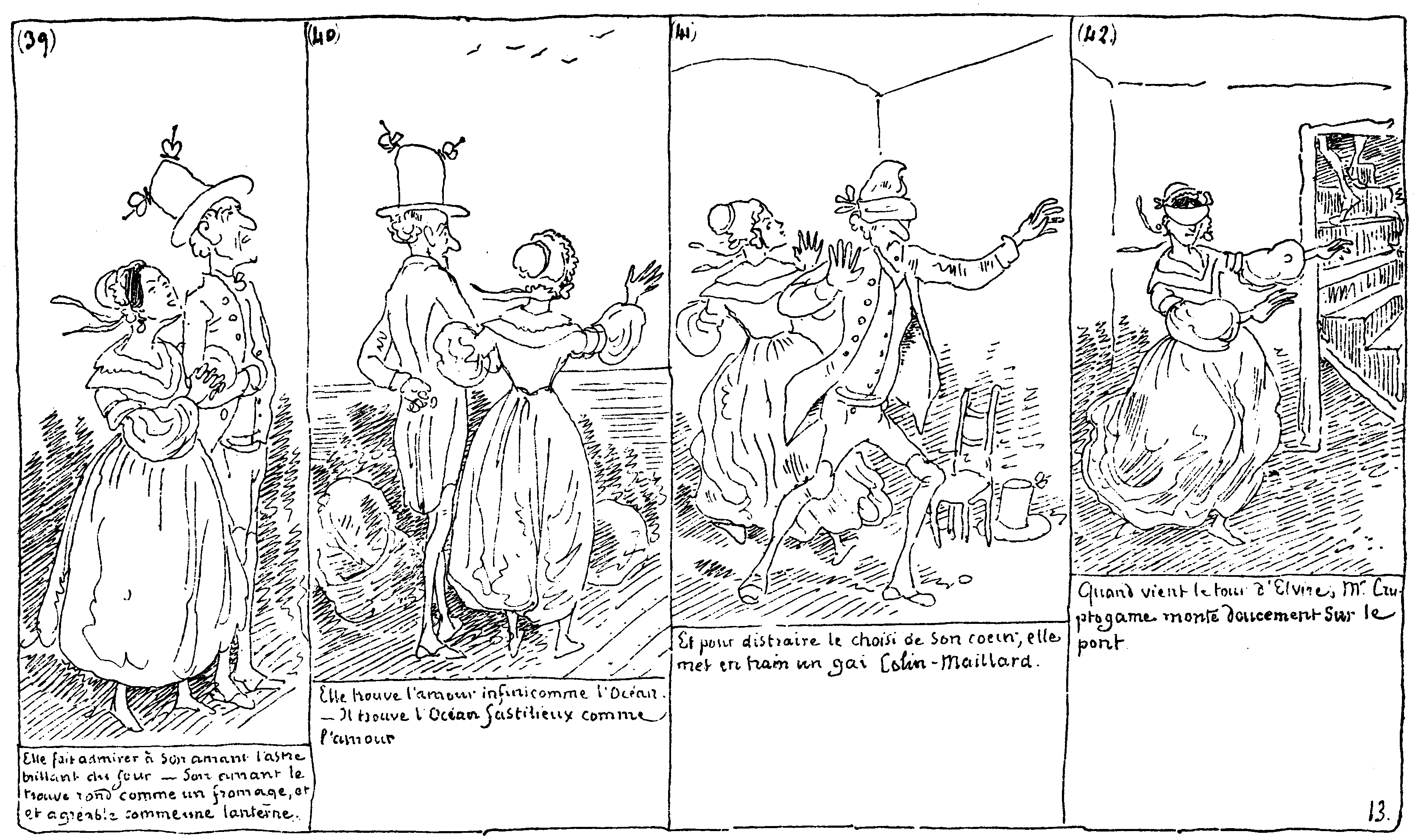
Histoire de Monsieur Cryptogame,
Rodolphe Töpffer, 1830

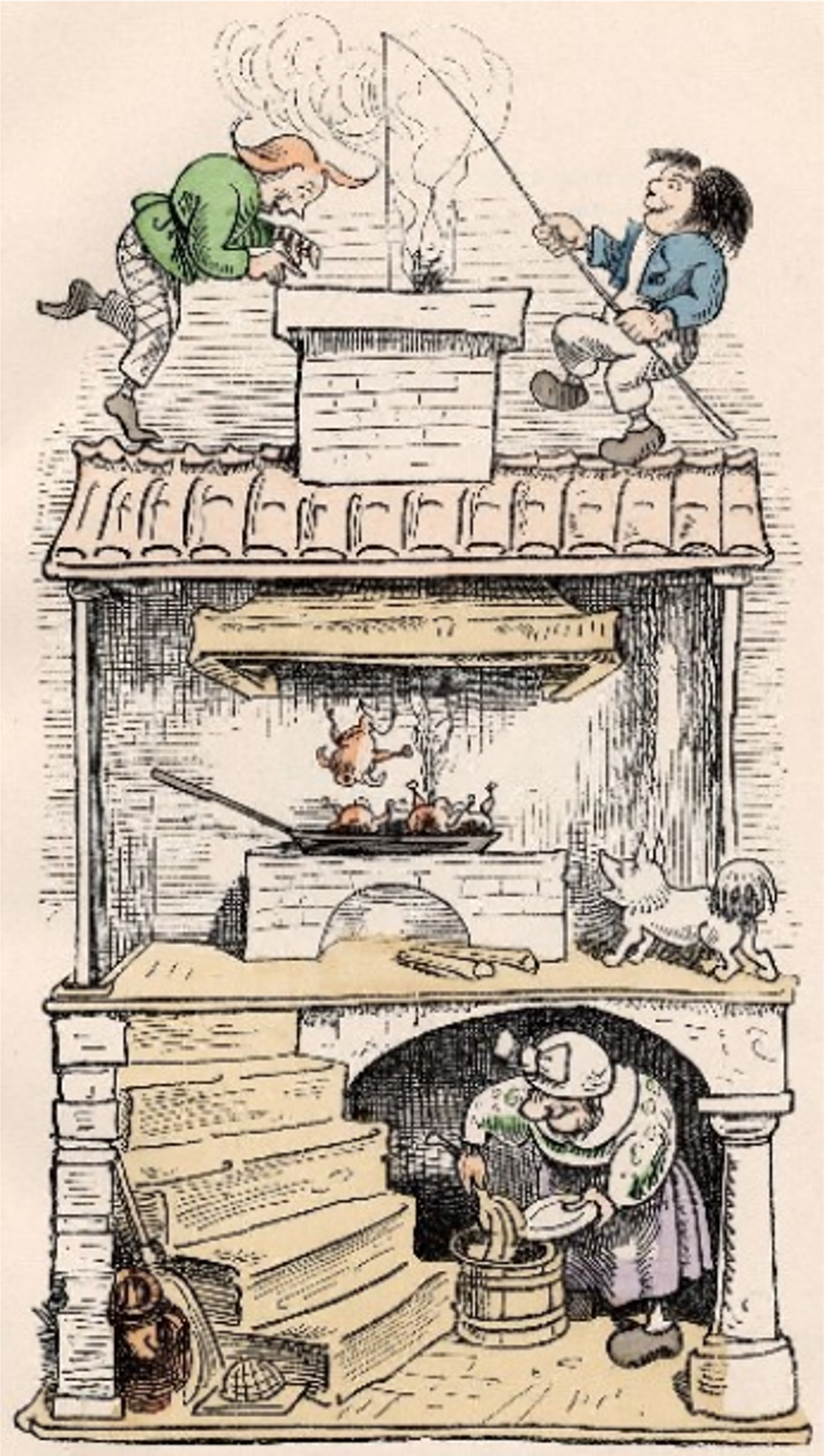
Max and Moritz,
Wilhelm Busch, 1865

Ally Sloper in Some of the Mysteries of Loan and Discount,
Charles Henry Ross, 1867

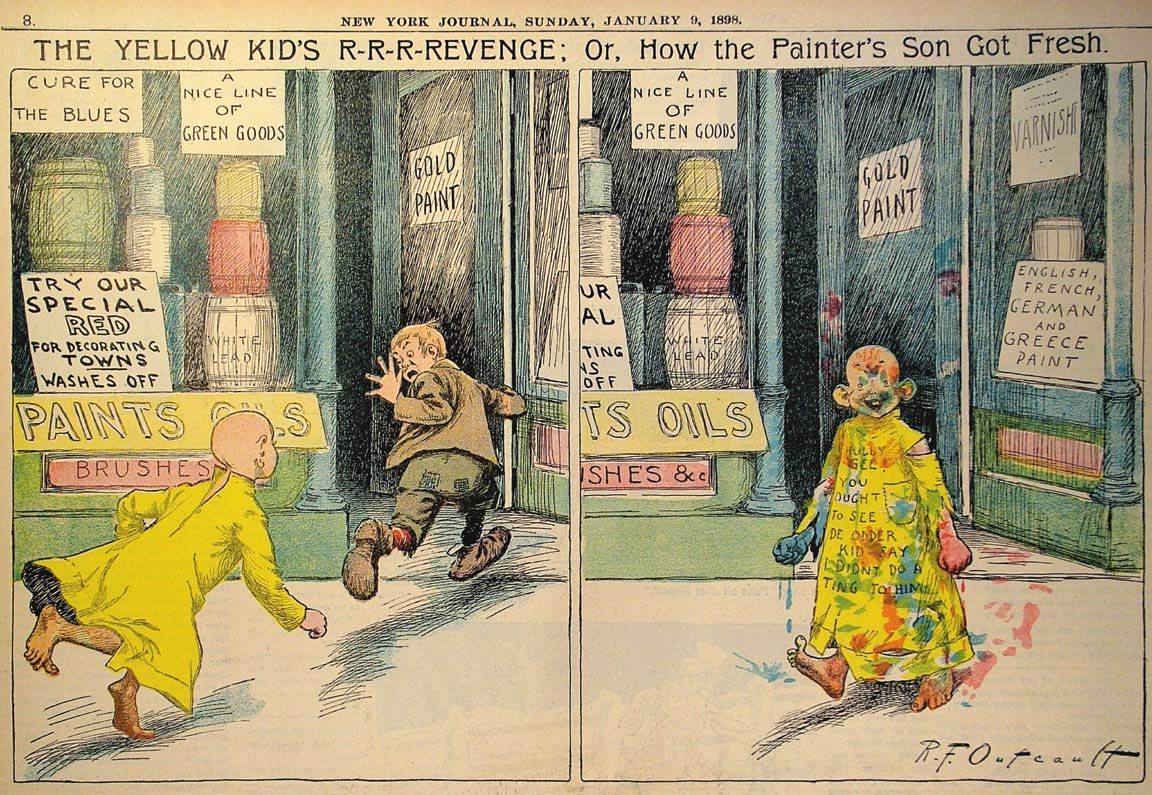
The Yellow Kid,
R. F. Outcault, 1898

The European, American, and Japanese comics traditions have followed different paths. Europeans have seen their tradition as beginning with the Swiss Rodolphe Töpffer from as early as 1827 and Americans have seen the origin of theirs in Richard F. Outcault's 1890s newspaper strip The Yellow Kid, though many Americans have come to recognize Töpffer's precedence. Wilhelm Busch directly influenced Rudolph Dirks and his comic strip Katzenjammer Kids. Japan has a long history of satirical cartoons and comics leading up to the World War II era. The ukiyo-e artist Hokusai popularized the Japanese term for comics and cartooning, manga, in the early 19th century. In the 1930s Harry "A" Chesler started a comics studio, which eventually at its height employed 40 artists working for 50 different publishers who helped make the comics medium flourish in "the Golden Age of Comics" after World War II. In the post-war era, modern Japanese comics began to flourish when Osamu Tezuka produced a prolific body of work. Towards the close of the 20th century, these three traditions converged in a trend towards book-length comics: the comic album in Europe, the tankōbon format (Note: tankōbon (単行本; translation close to "independently appearing book")) in Japan, and the graphic novel in English-speaking countries.

Outside of these genealogies, comics theorists and historians have seen precedents for comics in the Lascaux cave paintings in France (some of which appear to be chronological sequences of images), Egyptian hieroglyphs, Trajan's Column in Rome, the 11th-century Norman Bayeux Tapestry, the 1370 bois Protat woodcut, the 15th-century Ars moriendi and block books, Michelangelo's The Last Judgment in the Sistine Chapel, and William Hogarth's 18th-century sequential engravings, amongst others. (Note: David Kunzle has compiled extensive collections of these and other proto-comics in his The Early Comic Strip (1973) and The History of the Comic Strip (1990).)

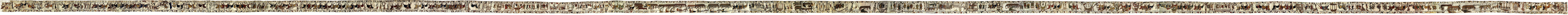
Theorists debate whether the Bayeux Tapestry is a precursor to comics.

=== English-language comics ===
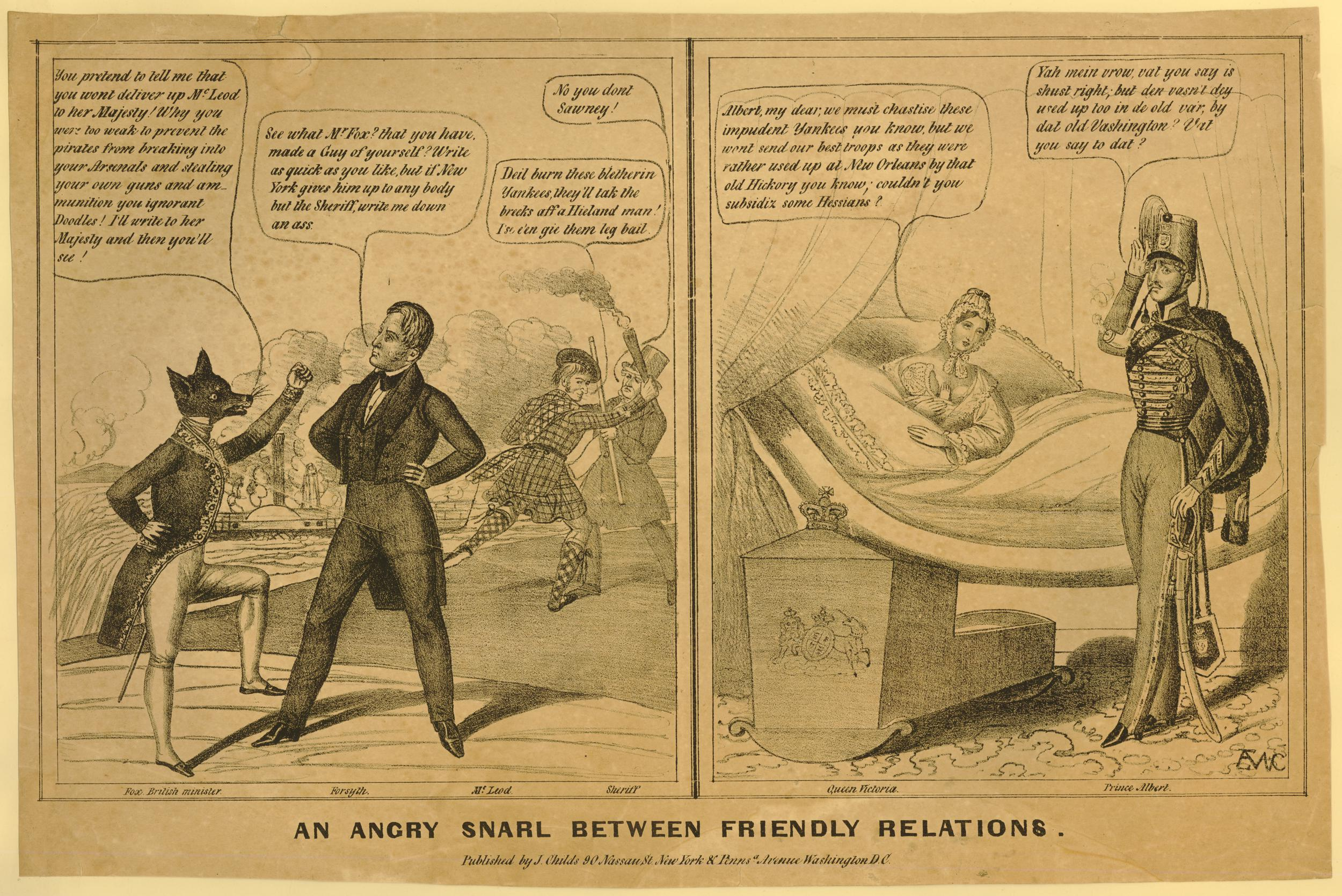
"An angry snarl between friendly relations" - Satirical print on the politics around the Caroline Affair (1840–1841)

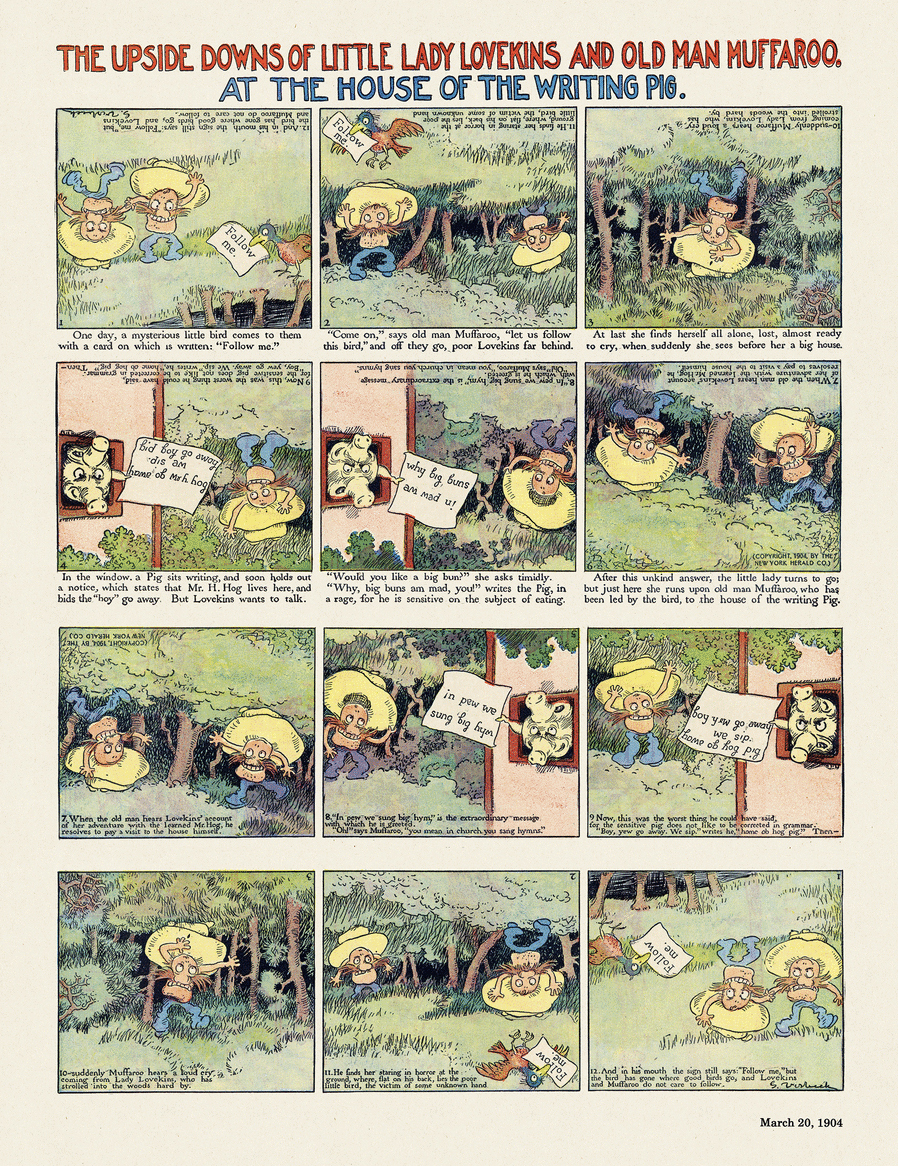
The Upside Downs of Little Lady Lovekins and Old Man Muffaroo – At the house of the writing pig, by Gustave Verbeek, 1904, containing reversible figures and ambigram sentences

Illustrated humour periodicals were popular in 19th-century Britain, the earliest of which was the short-lived The Glasgow Looking Glass in 1825. The most popular was Punch, which popularized the term cartoon for its humorous caricatures. On occasion the cartoons in these magazines appeared in sequences; the character Ally Sloper featured in the earliest serialized comic strip when the character began to feature in its own weekly magazine in 1884.

American comics developed out of such magazines as Puck, Judge, and Life. The success of illustrated humour supplements in the New York World and later the New York American, particularly Outcault's The Yellow Kid, led to the development of newspaper comic strips. Early Sunday strips were full-page and often in colour. Between 1896 and 1901 cartoonists experimented with sequentiality, movement, and speech balloons. An example is Gustave Verbeek, who wrote his comic series The Upside Downs of Old Man Muffaroo and Little Lady Lovekins between 1903 and 1905. These comics were made in such a way that one could read the 6-panel comic, flip the book and keep reading. He made 64 such comics in total. In 2012, a remake of a selection of the comics was made by Marcus Ivarsson in the book 'In Uppåner med Lilla Lisen & Gamle Muppen'. (ISBN 978-91-7089-524-1)

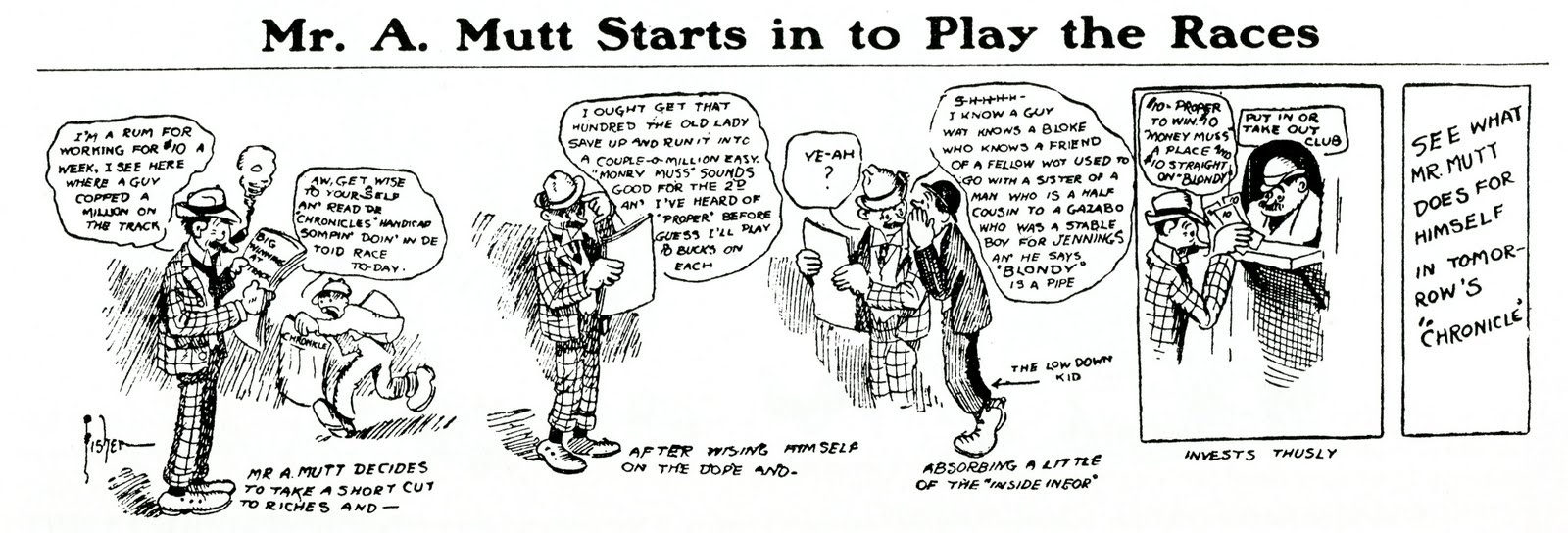
Mutt and Jeff (1907–1982), by Bud Fisher, was the first successful daily comic strip.

Shorter, black-and-white daily strips began to appear early in the 20th century, and became established in newspapers after the success in 1907 of Bud Fisher's Mutt and Jeff. In Britain, the Amalgamated Press established a popular style of a sequence of images with text beneath them, including Illustrated Chips and Comic Cuts. Humour strips predominated at first, and in the 1920s and 1930s strips with continuing stories in genres such as adventure and drama also became popular.

Thin periodicals called comic books appeared in the 1930s, at first reprinting newspaper comic strips; by the end of the decade, original content began to dominate. The success in 1938 of Action Comics and its lead hero Superman marked the beginning of the Golden Age of Comic Books, in which the superhero genre was prominent. In the UK and the Commonwealth, the DC Thomson-created Dandy (1937) and Beano (1938) became successful humor-based titles, with a combined circulation of over 2 million copies by the 1950s. Their characters, including "Dennis the Menace", "Desperate Dan" and "The Bash Street Kids" have been read by generations of British children. The comics originally experimented with superheroes and action stories before settling on humorous strips featuring a mix of the Amalgamated Press and US comic book styles.

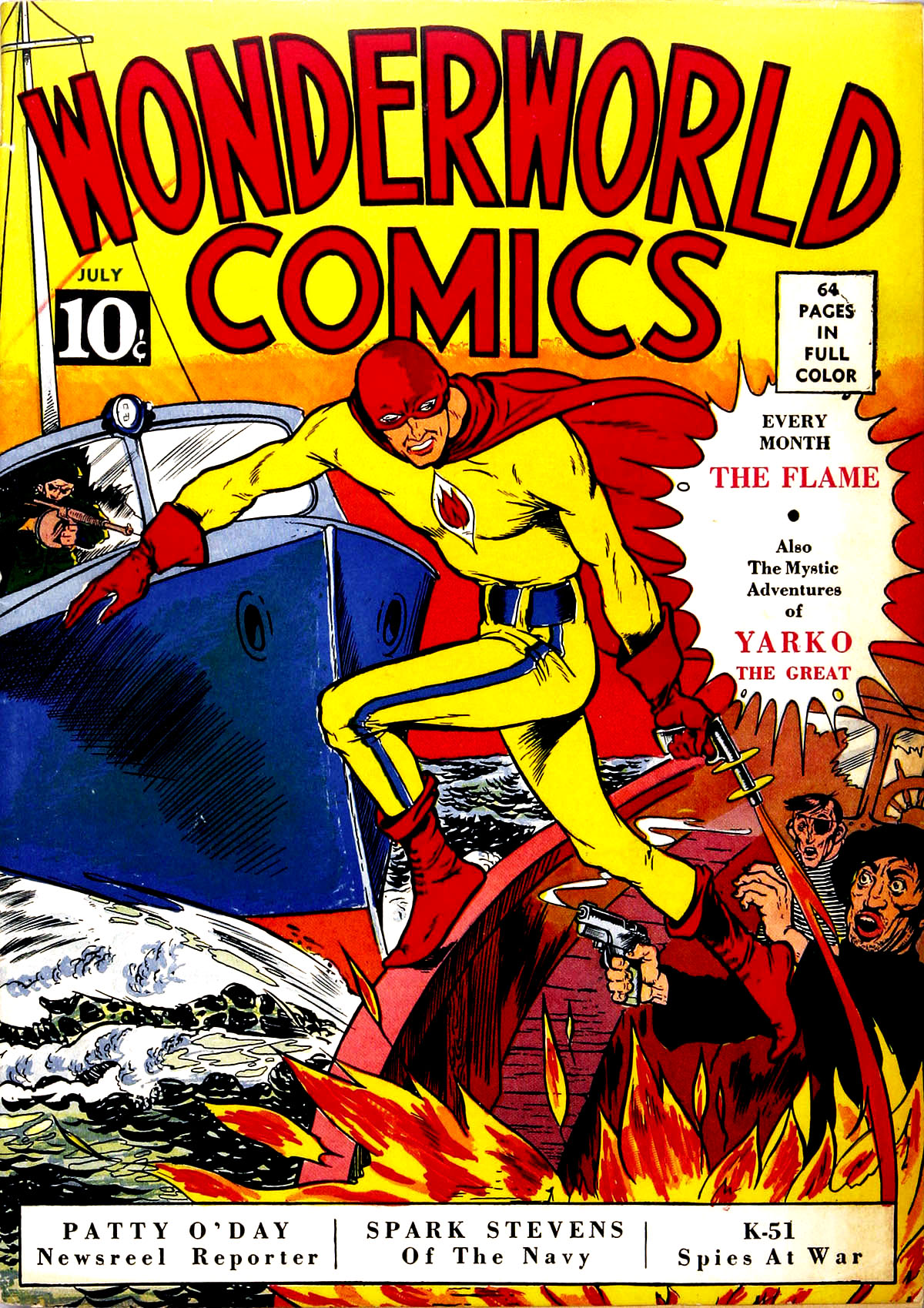
Superheroes have been a staple of American comic books. (Wonderworld Comics #3, 1939; cover: The Flame by Will Eisner)

The popularity of superhero comic books declined in the years following World War II, while comic book sales continued to increase as other genres proliferated, such as romance, westerns, crime, horror, and humour. Following a sales peak in the early 1950s, the content of comic books (particularly crime and horror) was subjected to scrutiny from parent groups and government agencies, which culminated in Senate hearings that led to the establishment of the Comics Code Authority self-censoring body. The Code has been blamed for stunting the growth of American comics and maintaining its low status in American society for much of the remainder of the century. Superheroes re-established themselves as the most prominent comic book genre by the early 1960s. Underground comix challenged the Code and readers with adult, countercultural content in the late 1960s and early 1970s. The underground gave birth to the alternative comics movement in the 1980s and its mature, often experimental content in non-superhero genres.

Comics in the US has had a lowbrow reputation stemming from its roots in mass culture; cultural elites sometimes saw popular culture as threatening culture and society. In the latter half of the 20th century, popular culture won greater acceptance, and the lines between high and low culture began to blur. Comics nevertheless continued to be stigmatized, as the medium was seen as entertainment for children and illiterates.

The graphic novel—book-length comics—began to gain attention after Will Eisner popularized the term with his book A Contract with God (1978). The term became widely known with the public after the commercial success of Maus, Watchmen, and The Dark Knight Returns in the mid-1980s. Graphic novels became well-established in mainstream bookstores and libraries by the 21st century, and webcomics experienced a massive surge in popularity.

=== Franco-Belgian and European comics ===
Cartoons began appearing widely in European newspapers and magazines starting in the mid-19th century.The francophone Swiss Rodolphe Töpffer produced comic strips beginning in 1827, and published theories behind the form. Wilhelm Busch first published Max and Moritz in 1865. The success of Zig et Puce in 1925 popularized the use of speech balloons in European comics, after which Franco-Belgian comics began to dominate. The Adventures of Tintin, with its signature clear line style, was first serialized in newspaper comics supplements beginning in 1929, and became an icon of Franco-Belgian comics.

Following the success of Le Journal de Mickey (est. 1934), dedicated comics magazines like Spirou (est. 1938) and Tintin (1946–1993), and full-colour comic albums became the primary outlet for comics in the mid-20th century. As in the US, comics were seen as infantile and a threat to culture and literacy during this time; commentators stated that "none bear up to the slightest serious analysis", (Note: French: "... aucune ne supporte une analyse un peu serieuse." – Jacqueline & Raoul Dubois in La Presse enfantine française (Midol, 1957)) and that comics were "the sabotage of all art and all literature". (Note: French: "C'est le sabotage de tout art et de toute littérature." – Jean de Trignon in Histoires de la littérature enfantine de ma Mère l'Oye au Roi Babar (Hachette, 1950))

In the 1960s, the term bandes dessinées ("drawn strips") came into widespread use in French to denote the medium. Cartoonists began creating comics for mature audiences, and the term "Ninth Art" (Note: French: neuvième art) was coined, as comics began to attract public and academic attention as an art form. A group including René Goscinny and Albert Uderzo founded the magazine Pilote in 1959 to give artists greater freedom over their work. Goscinny and Uderzo's The Adventures of Asterix appeared in it and went on to become the best-selling French-language comic series. In 1960, the satirical and taboo-breaking Hara-Kiri defied censorship laws in the countercultural spirit that led to the May 1968 events.

Frustration with censorship and editorial interference led to a group of Pilote cartoonists to found the adults-only L'Écho des savanes in 1972. Adult-oriented and experimental comics flourished in the 1970s, such as in the experimental science fiction of Mœbius and others in Métal hurlant, and even mainstream publishers took to publishing prestige-format adult comics.

From the 1980s onwards, mainstream sensibilities were reasserted and serialization became less common as the number of comics magazines decreased and many comics began to be published directly as albums. Smaller publishers such as L'Association that published longer works in non-traditional formats by auteur-istic creators also became common. Since the 1990s, mergers resulted in fewer large publishers, while smaller publishers proliferated. Sales overall continued to grow despite the trend towards a shrinking print market.

=== Japanese comics ===
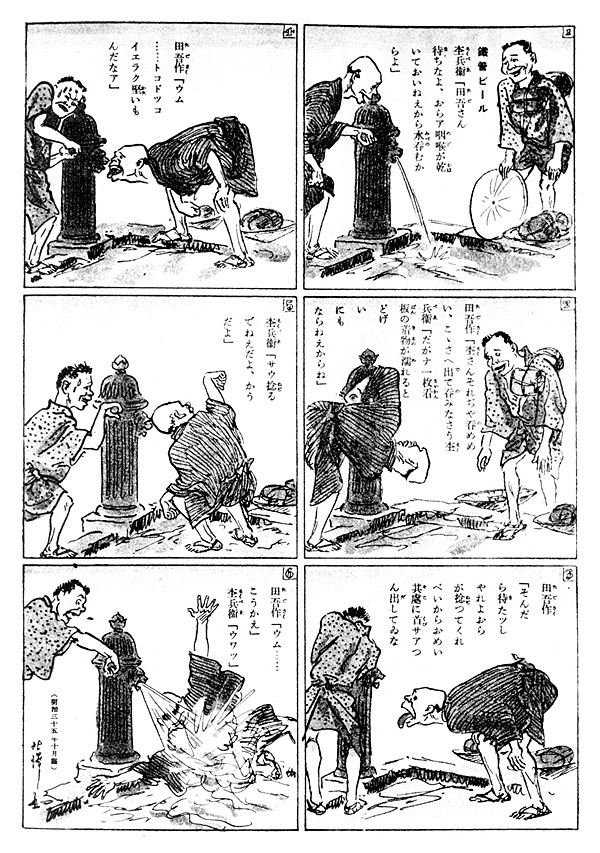
Rakuten Kitazawa created the first modern Japanese comic strip. (Tagosaku to Mokube no Tōkyō Kenbutsu, (Note: Tagosaku and Mokube Sightseeing in Tokyo (Japanese: 田吾作と杢兵衛の東京見物, Hepburn: Tagosaku to Mokube no Tokyo Kenbutsu)) 1902)

Japanese comics and cartooning, known as manga, (Note: "Manga" (Japanese: 漫画) can be glossed in many ways, amongst them "whimsical pictures", "disreputable pictures", "irresponsible pictures", "derisory pictures", and "sketches made for or out of a sudden inspiration".) have a history that has been seen as far back as the anthropomorphic characters in the 12th-to-13th-century Chōjū-jinbutsu-giga, 17th-century toba-e and kibyōshi picture books, and woodblock prints such as ukiyo-e that were popular between the 17th and 20th centuries. The kibyōshi contained examples of sequential images, movement lines, and sound effects.

Illustrated magazines from Western expatriates introduced Western-style satirical cartoons to Japan in the late 19th century. New publications in both the Western and Japanese styles became popular, and by the end of the 1890s, American-style newspaper comics supplements began to appear in Japan, as well as some American comic strips. 1900 saw the debut of the Jiji Manga in the Jiji Shinpō newspaper—the first use of the word "manga" in its modern sense, and where, in 1902, Rakuten Kitazawa began the first modern Japanese comic strip. By the 1930s, comic strips were serialized in large-circulation monthly girls' and boys' magazine and collected into hardback volumes.

The modern era of comics in Japan began after World War II, propelled by the success of the serialized comics of the prolific Osamu Tezuka and the comic strip Sazae-san. Genres and audiences diversified over the following decades. Stories are usually first serialized in magazines which are often hundreds of pages thick and may contain over a dozen stories; they are later compiled in tankōbon-format books. At the turn of the 20th and 21st centuries, nearly a quarter of all printed material in Japan was comics. Translations became extremely popular in foreign markets—in some cases equaling or surpassing the sales of domestic comics.

=== Korean comics ===
Manhwa ( 만화 ) refers to Korean comics and print cartoons, with the term often used internationally to designate comics originating in Korea. While manhwa shares cultural and linguistic roots with Japanese manga and Chinese manhua, it has developed a unique identity influenced by Korea's historical, cultural, and artistic landscape. Modern manhwa has gained global popularity, partly due to the rise of webtoons—digitally formatted comics designed for scrolling on mobile devices. Manhwa is one of the major cultural exports of Korea, starting in its rise from being considered a lowly art form in the 1990's to currently being a "national" product. This success has contributed to adaptations into movies, dramas, and television series.

The concept of manhwa emerged under the influence of Japanese manga during the Japanese occupation of Korea in the early 20th century. Manga's established presence in Japan during this period strongly shaped the foundational styles and formats of Korean comics. As Korea transitioned into independence, manhwa evolved into a distinct medium, balancing the artistic influences of its neighbors with traditional Korean aesthetics and storytelling.

=== Chinese comics ===
Manhua (漫画 or 漫畫) refers to Chinese comics, cartoons, and caricatures. The term encompasses a variety of illustrated works, ranging from single-panel satirical drawings to sequential comic narratives. Modern manhua developed alongside the growth of the Chinese illustrated press in the late 19th and early 20th centuries, particularly in urban centres such as Shanghai and Tianjin, where newspapers and pictorial magazines provided platforms for cartoonists and illustrators.

The modern use of the term became established through the work of artists such as Feng Zikai, who adopted the Japanese-derived word manga to describe a form of Chinese cartoon-style painting. During the early 20th century, manhua developed into a recognised form of popular visual culture, combining satire, social commentary, and narrative illustration. Its development was influenced by both Chinese artistic traditions and international cartooning styles, while its formats and subject matter continued to evolve across different periods and regions.

=== Argentine comics ===
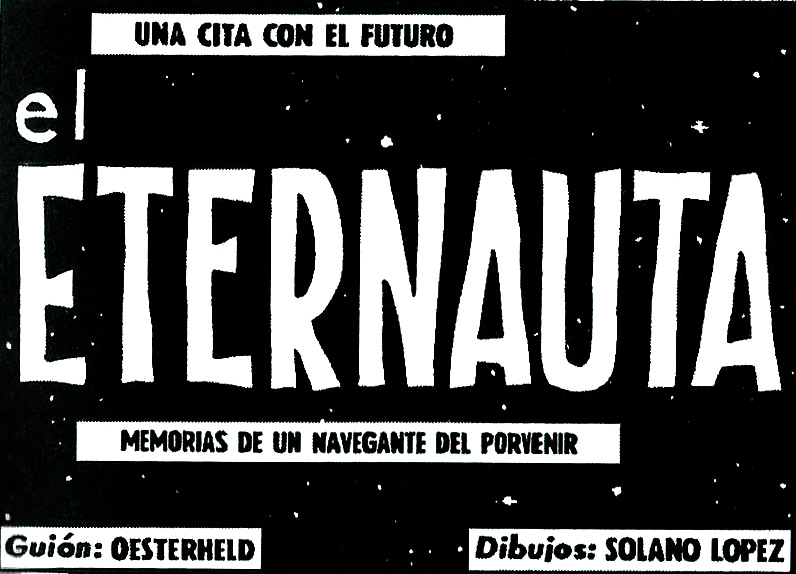
First page of The Eternaut, published in Hora Cero in 1957

In early 20th century Argentina, political comics featuring caricatures of local politicians and celebrities became popular. The most famous of them is Caras y caretas, which continues to be published in the present.

By the 1940s and 1950s, the Argentine comic industry flourished through new characters oriented to children and teenagers, such as Patoruzú (a wealthy tehuelche cacique of Patagonia) and Isidoro Cañones (a frivolous man of Buenos Aires), both created by Dante Quinterno.

Between 1957 and 1959, El Eternauta was published an internationally acclaimed attempt to create more mature comic stories in Argentina. Created by Héctor Germán Oesterheld and Francisco Solano López, it is a science fiction story about an alien invasion in Buenos Aires, along with a toxic snowfall that would kill anyone who touched it. It is considered to represent the dictatorship of 1955 which persecuted peronists (Oesterheld himself being peronist). Oesterheld and his whole family would end up being disappeared by the dictatorship.

In the 1960s, the Anteojito children's magazine was created, in which Manuel García Ferré would go on to publish the stories of many characters that would become household names, such as Hijitus (a poor and naive boy whose hat gave him superpowers) and Larguirucho (his companion).

Between the 1960s and 1970s, one of the most famous comic characters of Argentina appeared, Mafalda, created by Quino. It was popular all over Latin America and Europe. Mafalda was considered a satire of the middle-class urban families, and showcased the progressive political inclinations of the youth.

In the 1970s, a popular comic character was Clemente, created by Caloi. It was a fictional animal without arms or wings, who only ate olives and drank mate. Despite the 1970s being a time of political turmoil in Argentina, Clemente was peronist and fond of association football.

== Forms and formats ==
Comic strips are generally short, multipanel comics that have, since the early 20th century, most commonly appeared in newspapers. In the US, daily strips have normally occupied a single tier, while Sunday strips have been given multiple tiers. Since the early 20th century, daily newspaper comic strips have typically been printed in black-and-white and Sunday comics have usually been printed in colour and have often occupied a full newspaper page.

Specialized comics periodicals formats vary greatly in different cultures. Comic books, primarily an American format, are thin periodicals usually published in colour. European and Japanese comics are frequently serialized in magazines—monthly or weekly in Europe, and usually black-and-white and weekly or monthly in Japan. Japanese comics magazines typically run to hundreds of pages.

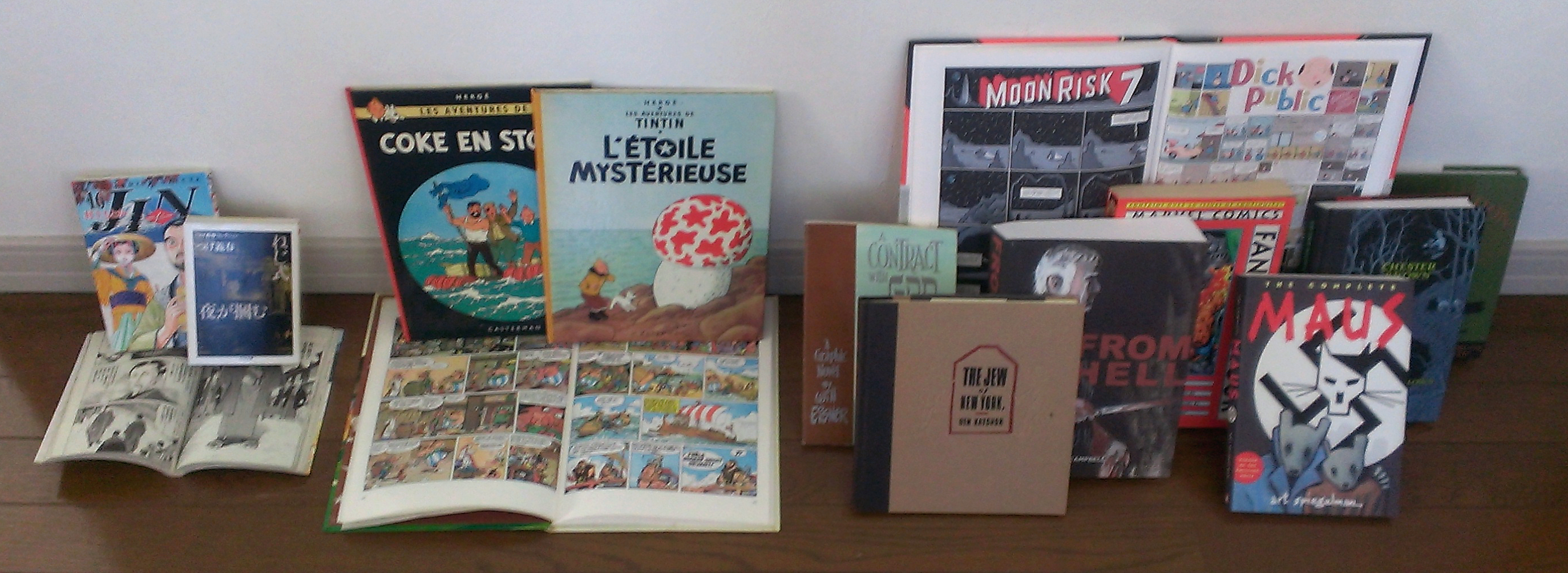
A comparison of book formats for comics around the world. The left group is from Japan and shows the tankōbon and the smaller bunkobon formats. Those in the middle group of Franco-Belgian comics are in the standard A4-size comic album format. The right group of graphic novels is from English-speaking countries, where there is no standard format.

Book-length comics take different forms in different regions. European comic albums are most commonly colour volumes printed at A4-size, a larger page size than used in many other cultures. In English-speaking countries, the trade paperback format originating from collected comic books have also been chosen for original material. Otherwise, bound volumes of comics are called graphic novels and are available in various formats. Despite incorporating the term "novel"—a term normally associated with fiction—"graphic novel" also refers to non-fiction and collections of short works. Japanese comics are collected in volumes called tankōbon following magazine serialization.

Gag and editorial cartoons usually consist of a single panel, often incorporating a caption or speech balloon. Definitions of comics which emphasize sequence usually exclude gag, editorial, and other single-panel cartoons; they can be included in definitions that emphasize the combination of word and image. Gag cartoons first began to proliferate in broadsheets published in Europe in the 18th and 19th centuries, and the term "cartoon" (Note: "cartoon": from the Italian cartone, meaning "card", which referred to the cardboard on which the cartoons were typically drawn.) was first used to describe them in 1843 in the British humour magazine Punch.

Webcomics are comics that are written for and published on the internet, first debuting the 1980s. They are able to potentially reach large audiences, and new readers can often access archives of previous installments. Webcomics often make use of an infinite canvas, meaning they are not constrained by the size or dimensions of a printed comics page.

Some consider storyboards and wordless novels to be comics. Film studios, especially in animation, often use sequences of images as guides for scenes. These storyboards are not intended as an end product and are rarely released to the public. Wordless novels are books which use sequences of captionless images to deliver a narrative.

== Comics studies ==
"Comics ... are sometimes four-legged and sometimes two-legged and sometimes fly and sometimes don't ... to employ a metaphor as mixed as the medium itself, defining comics entails cutting a Gordian-knotted enigma wrapped in a mystery ..."

— R. C. Harvey, 2001

Similar to the problems of defining literature and film, no consensus has been reached on a definition of the comics medium, and attempted definitions and descriptions have fallen prey to numerous exceptions. Theorists such as Töpffer, R. C. Harvey, Will Eisner, David Carrier, Alain Rey, and Lawrence Grove emphasize the combination of text and images, though there are prominent examples of pantomime comics throughout its history. Other critics, such as Thierry Groensteen and Scott McCloud, have emphasized the primacy of sequences of images. Towards the close of the 20th century, different cultures' discoveries of each other's comics traditions, the rediscovery of forgotten early comics forms, and the rise of new forms made defining comics a more complicated task.

European comics studies began with Töpffer's theories of his own work in the 1840s, which emphasized panel transitions and the visual–verbal combination. No further progress was made until the 1970s. Pierre Fresnault-Deruelle then took a semiotics approach to the study of comics, analyzing text–image relations, page-level image relations, and image discontinuities, or what McCloud later dubbed "closure". In 1987, Henri Vanlier introduced the term multicadre, or "multiframe", to refer to the comics page as a semantic unit. By the 1990s, theorists such as Benoît Peeters and Groensteen turned attention to artists' poïetic creative choices. Thierry Smolderen and Harry Morgan have held relativistic views of the definition of comics, a medium that has taken various, equally valid forms over its history. Morgan sees comics as a subset of "les littératures dessinées" (or "drawn literatures"). French theory has come to give special attention to the page, in distinction from American theories such as McCloud's which focus on panel-to-panel transitions. In the mid-2000s, Neil Cohn began analyzing how comics are understood using tools from cognitive science, extending beyond theory by using actual psychological and neuroscience experiments. This work has argued that sequential images and page layouts both use separate rule-bound "grammars" to be understood that extend beyond panel-to-panel transitions and categorical distinctions of types of layouts, and that the brain's comprehension of comics is similar to comprehending other domains, such as language and music.

Historical narratives of manga tend to focus either on its recent, post-WWII history, or on attempts to demonstrate deep roots in the past, such as to the Chōjū-jinbutsu-giga picture scroll of the 12th and 13th centuries, or the early 19th-century Hokusai Manga. The first historical overview of Japanese comics was Seiki Hosokibara's Nihon Manga-Shi in 1924. Early post-war Japanese criticism was mostly of a left-wing political nature until the 1986 publication of Tomofusa Kure's Modern Manga: The Complete Picture, (Note: Kure, Tomofusa (1986). 現代漫画の全体像 [Modern Manga: The Complete Picture]. Joho Center Publishing. ISBN 978-4-575-71090-8.) which de-emphasized politics in favour of formal aspects, such as structure and a "grammar" of comics. The field of manga studies increased rapidly, with numerous books on the subject appearing in the 1990s. Formal theories of manga have focused on developing a "manga expression theory", (Note: "Manga expression theory" (Japanese: 漫画表現論, Hepburn: manga hyōgenron)) with emphasis on spatial relationships in the structure of images on the page, distinguishing the medium from film or literature, in which the flow of time is the basic organizing element. Comics studies courses have proliferated at Japanese universities, and Japan Society for Studies in Cartoon and Comics (ja) (Note: Japan Society for Studies in Cartoon and Comics (Japanese: 日本マンガ学会, Hepburn: Nihon Manga Gakkai)) was established in 2001 to promote comics scholarship. The publication of Frederik L. Schodt's Manga! Manga! The World of Japanese Comics in 1983 led to the spread of use of the word manga outside Japan to mean "Japanese comics" or "Japanese-style comics".

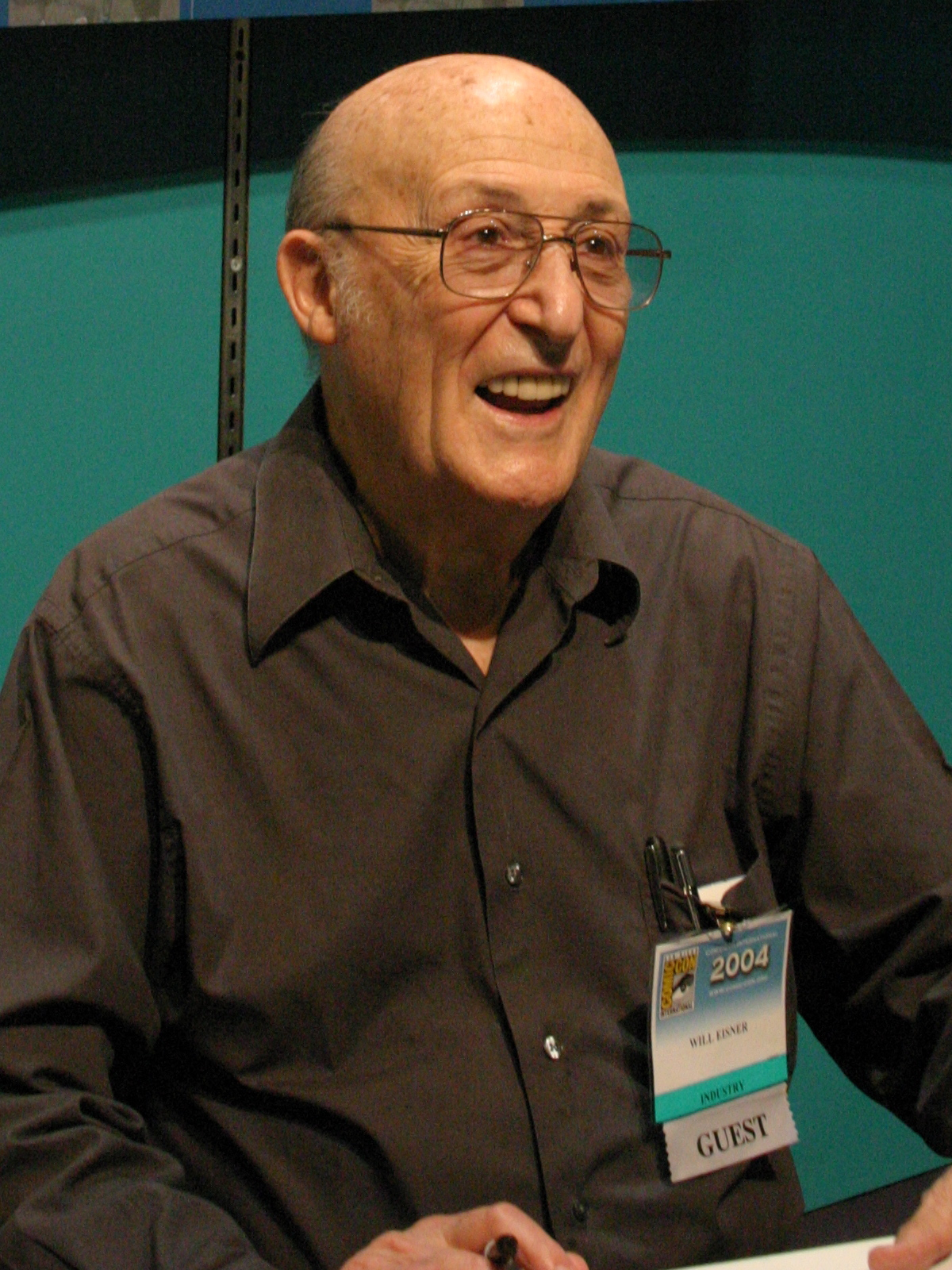
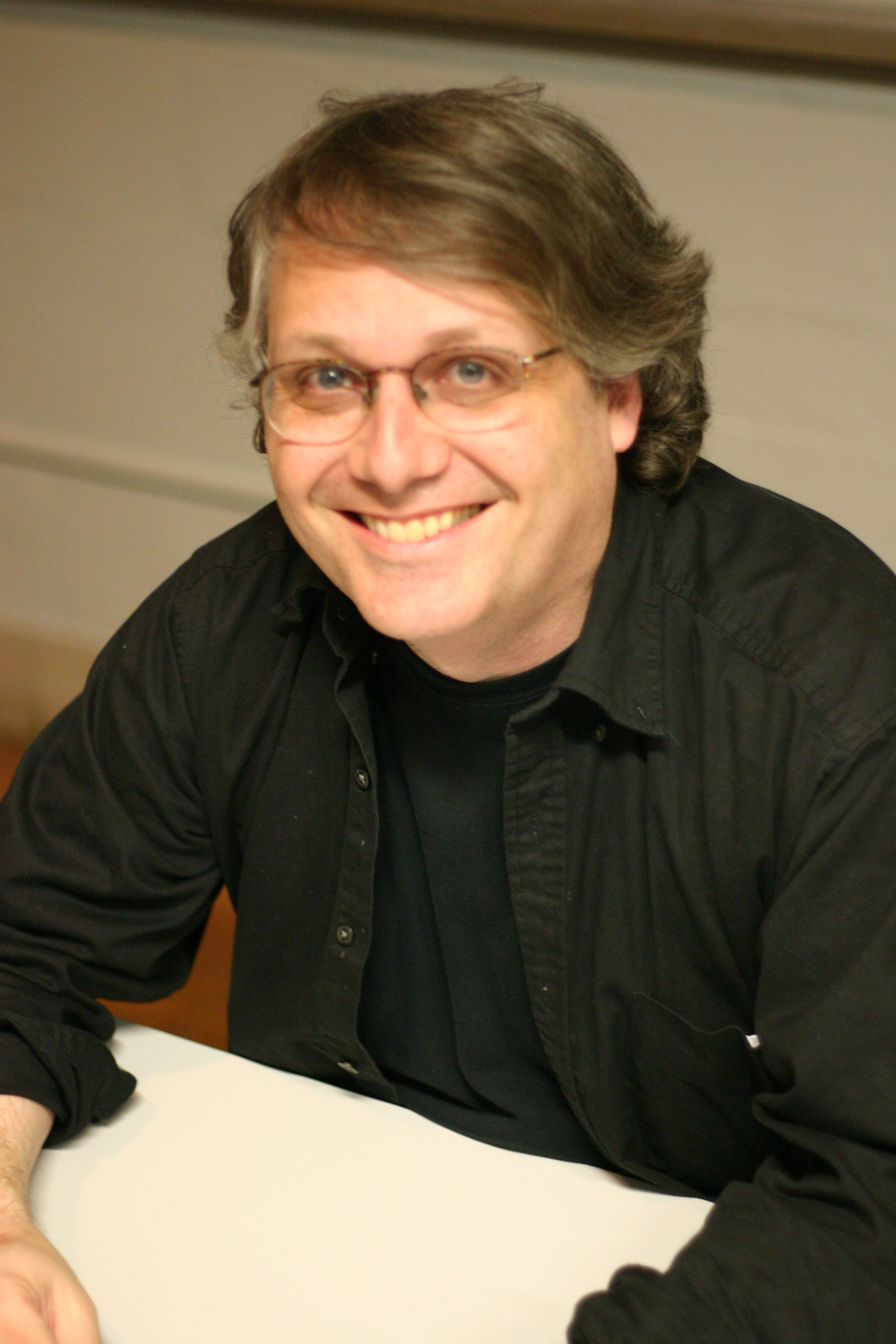
Will Eisner (left) and Scott McCloud (right) have proposed influential and controversial definitions of comics.

Coulton Waugh attempted the first comprehensive history of American comics with The Comics (1947). Will Eisner's Comics and Sequential Art (1985) and McCloud's Understanding Comics (1993) were early attempts in English to formalize the study of comics. Carrier's The Aesthetics of Comics (2000) was the first full-length treatment of comics from a philosophical perspective. Prominent American attempts at definitions of comics include Eisner's, McCloud's, and Harvey's. Eisner described what he called "sequential art" as "the arrangement of pictures or images and words to narrate a story or dramatize an idea"; McCloud defined comics as "juxtaposed pictorial and other images in deliberate sequence, intended to convey information and/or to produce an aesthetic response in the viewer", a strictly formal definition which detached comics from its historical and cultural trappings. Harvey defined comics as "pictorial narratives or expositions in which words (often lettered into the picture area within speech balloons) usually contribute to the meaning of the pictures and vice versa". Each definition has had its detractors. Harvey saw McCloud's definition as excluding single-panel cartoons and objected to McCloud's de-emphasizing verbal elements, insisting "the essential characteristic of comics is the incorporation of verbal content". Aaron Meskin saw McCloud's theories as an artificial attempt to legitimize the place of comics in art history.

Cross-cultural study of comics is complicated by the great difference in meaning and scope of the words for "comics" in different languages. The French term for comics, bandes dessinées ("drawn strip") emphasizes the juxtaposition of drawn images as a defining factor, which can imply the exclusion of even photographic comics. Manga is used in Japanese to indicate all forms of comics, cartooning, and caricature, regardless of origin.

== Terminology ==
The term comics refers to the comics medium when used as an uncountable noun and thus takes the singular: "comics is a medium" rather than "comics are a medium". When comic appears as a countable noun, it refers to instances of the medium, such as individual comic strips or comic books: "Tom's comics are in the basement."

Panels are individual images containing a segment of action, often surrounded by a border. Prime moments in a narrative are broken down into panels via a process called encapsulation. The reader puts the pieces together via the process of closure by using background knowledge and an understanding of panel relations to combine panels mentally into events. The size, shape, and arrangement of panels each affect the timing and pacing of the narrative. The contents of a panel may be asynchronous, with events depicted in the same image not necessarily occurring at the same time.

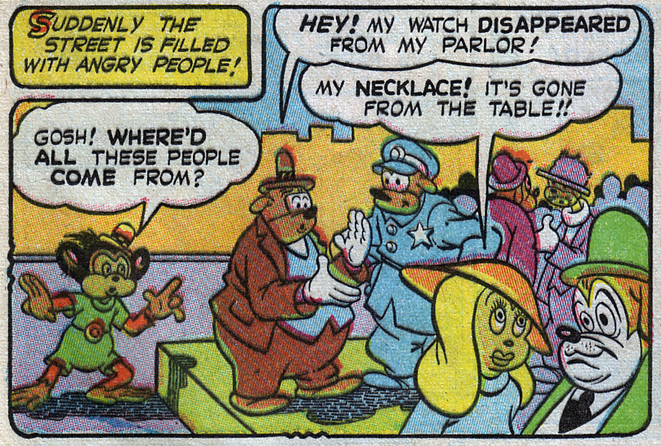
A caption (the yellow box) gives the narrator a voice. The characters' dialogue appears in speech balloons. The tail of the balloon indicates the speaker.

Text is frequently incorporated into comics via speech balloons, captions, and sound effects. Speech balloons indicate dialogue (or thought, in the case of thought balloons), with tails pointing at their respective speakers. Captions can give voice to a narrator, convey characters' dialogue or thoughts, or indicate place or time. Speech balloons themselves are strongly associated with comics, such that the addition of one to an image is sufficient to turn the image into a comic. Sound effects mimic non-vocal sounds textually using onomatopoeia sound-words.

Cartooning is most frequently used in making comics, traditionally using ink (especially India ink) with dip pens or ink brushes; mixed media and digital technology have also become common. Cartooning techniques such as motion lines and abstract symbols are often employed.

While comics are often the work of a single creator, the labour of making them is frequently divided between a number of specialists. There may be separate writers and artists, and artists may specialize in parts of the artwork such as characters or backgrounds, as is common in Japan. Particularly in American superhero comic books, the art may be divided between a penciller, who lays out the artwork in pencil; an inker, who finishes the artwork in ink; a colourist; and a letterer, who adds the captions and speech balloons.

=== Etymology ===
The English-language term comics derives from the humorous (or "comic") work which predominated in early American newspaper comic strips, but usage of the term has become standard for non-humorous works as well. The alternate spelling comix – coined by the underground comix movement – is sometimes used to address such ambiguities. The term "comic book" has a similarly confusing history since they are most often not humorous and are periodicals, not regular books. It is common in English to refer to the comics of different cultures by the terms used in their languages, such as manga for Japanese comics, or bandes dessinées for French-language Franco-Belgian comics.

Many cultures have taken their word for comics from English, including Russian (комикс, komiks) and German (comic). Similarly, the Chinese term manhua and the Korean manhwa derive from the Chinese characters with which the Japanese term manga is written.

== See also ==
- Animation
- Billy Ireland Cartoon Library & Museum
- Picture book

=== See also lists ===
- List of best-selling comic series
- List of best-selling manga
- List of comic books
- List of comics by country
- List of comics creators
- List of comics publishing companies
- List of comic strip syndicates
- List of Franco-Belgian comics series
- List of newspaper comic strips
- Lists of manga
- List of manga artists
- List of manga magazines
- List of manga publishers
- List of years in comics
- List of manhwa
