= The Plot: The Secret Story of The Protocols of the Elders of Zion =

2005 graphic novel by Will Eisner

- Creator: Will Eisner
- Date: 2005

The Plot: The Secret Story of the Protocols of the Elders of Zion is a graphic novel by American cartoonist Will Eisner released in 2005.

== Summary ==
The book tells of the antisemitic conspiracy behind the falsified work Protocols of the Elders of Zion, written by the Russian-French writer Mathieu Golovinski in 1905. Eisner was inspired to write it when a few years before his death in 2005 he learned Radio Islam was broadcasting the Protocols.

== Release and reception ==
The book was released by W. W. Norton in 2005 with an introduction by Umberto Eco entitled "The Power of Falsehood".

In Eye Magazine, Steve Heller praised Eisner for taking on the subject while Nicholas Lezard in The Guardian found the grey wash style used as "a dramatic instrument".
