= Archie O'Toole =

Publication information
- Publisher: Quality Comics
- First appearance: Feature Funnies #10 (Jul. 1938)
- Created by: Will Eisner

Archie O'Toole was an American Golden Age comic-strip created by Will Eisner (under the pseudonym "Bud Thomas") for Quality Comics in 1938.

Initially serving as both artist and writer, Eisner soon began delegating work on the comic to his Eisner & Iger junior associates (who included George Tuska.) Eisner left the feature in February 1941, though his assistants continued to use his pen name until the comic was discontinued in 1949.

== Premise ==
Archie O'Toole was a young native of the mid-Atlantic island of Pyromania, some three thousand miles from the East Coast. An itinerant painter by occupation, he found himself thrown in jail after painting a portrait of a bearded man (the mercurial dictator of Pyromania, Gil O. Teen, having banned beards.) Gil O. Teen then commanded Archie to paint his own portrait, but the artist tricked the dictator into falling off a balcony, an embarrassment which (under the laws of Pyromania) meant his automatic deposition. The grateful people declared O'Toole the new king of Pyromania.

Tall, gangly, and red-headed, O'Toole was good-natured, somewhat eccentric, and fond of bad novelty music, in particular a tune called "Flat Foot Floogie" ("with a floy floy ya de da yo de do") that the rest of the cast found extremely annoying.

The strip was launched in Feature Funnies, and its first year consisted mainly of O'Toole fending off Gil O. Teen's various attempts to regain power. This was followed by a trip to America (to secure a loan to address Pyromania's perennial budget shortfall), where the young king was greeted as a celebrity, and made a lot of money endorsing products; he also acquired a romantic interest in the angelic Suzy Sweet, the stepdaughter of a New York mobster who had tried to waylay him on the way home.

The strip's installments initially consisted of two pages, which allowed for a modicum of continuity, including a few recurring characters (such as an upper-class British bodyguard or an offensively stereotyped African-American "Finkelstein's monster"); however, these rarely made more than one or two appearances. Typical plots involved encounters with mobsters, fraught diplomatic visits by foreign dignitaries, seductive femme fatales, and encounters with the supernatural, such as the ghosts O'Toole found haunting the Pyromanian royal castle (who left in a huff after he tried to charge them rent.)

In August 1939, the comic was moved to Quality's newest title, Smash Comics, where it would remain for the rest of its run. The transition was marked by a shift to less-ambitious storytelling; the title was gradually scaled down to a single page, with less narrative content and more of a single-gag structure. Suzy Sweet was dropped without explanation after the penultimate Feature Funnies issue, while Gill O. Teen only outlasted her by one more, and the royal advisers became one-off characters. The art eventually departed considerably from Eisner's original style, and there were several instances of unsubtle plot recycling; the feature nonetheless remained popular enough to remain in print for another nine years, for a total of eighty-five consecutive issues.

== Publication history ==
Title	Appearances	First	Last	Issues	Notes
Feature Funnies	11	Jul 1938	May 1939	#10 - #20	
Feature Comics	2	Jun 1939	Jul 1939	#21 - #22	
Smash Comics	72	Aug 1939	Feb 1949	#1 - #41, #43 - 68, #70, #71, #78, #79, #81	
All Humor Comics	1 (reprint only)	Oct 1949	Oct 1949	#16	
