= Laives, Saône-et-Loire =

Laives
- Commune
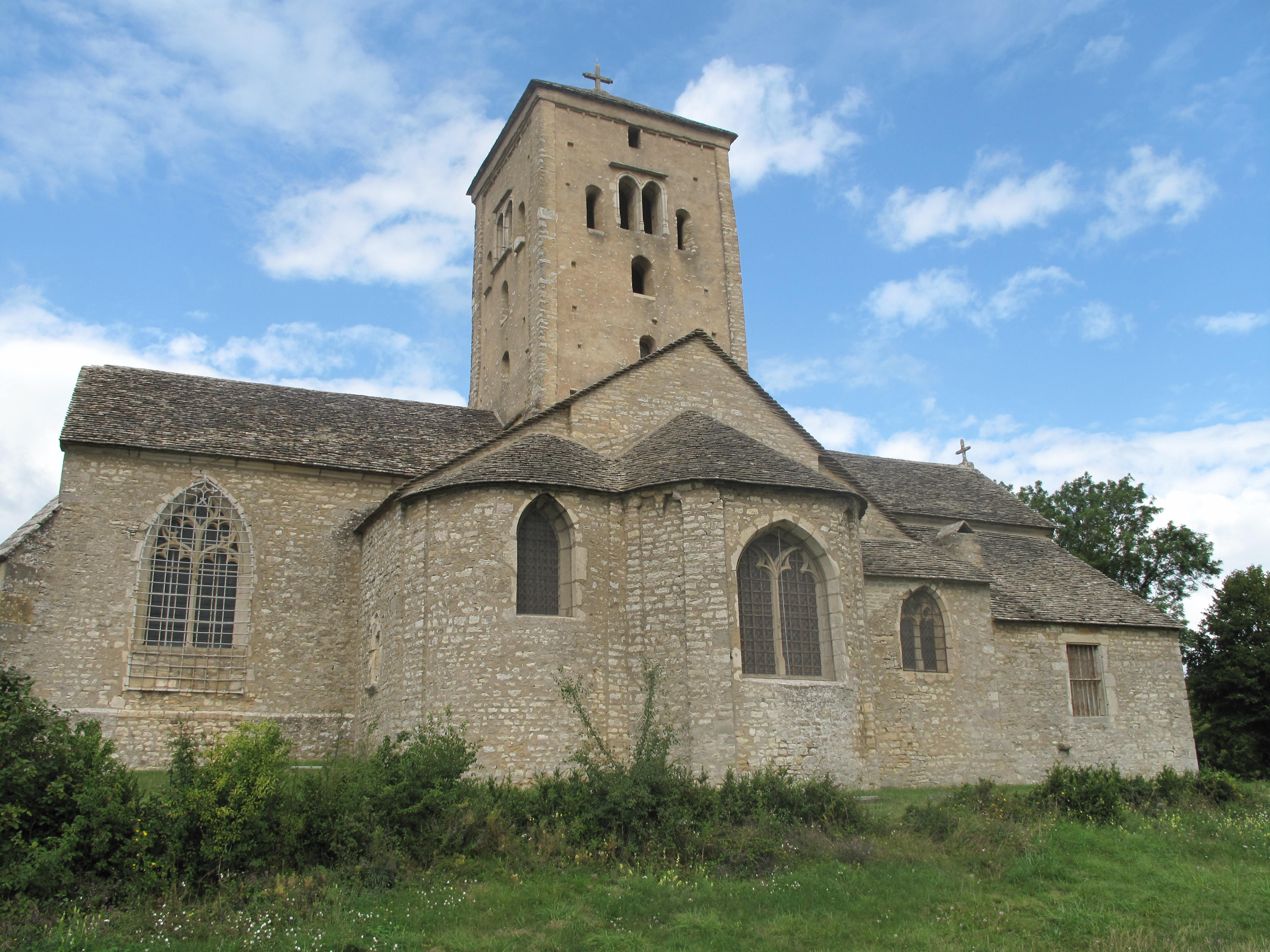
- The church of Saint-Martin in Laives
- Location of Laives
- Location within France Location within Bourgogne-Franche-Comté
- Coordinates: 46°38′46″N 4°50′47″E
- Country: France
- Region: Bourgogne-Franche-Comté
- Department: Saône-et-Loire
- Arrondissement: Chalon-sur-Saône
- Canton: Tournus
- Area^{1}: 12.62 km^{2} (4.87 sq mi)
- Elevation: 198 m (650 ft)
- Highest elevation: 331 m (1,086 ft)
- Lowest elevation: 177 m (581 ft)
- Population (2023): 986
  - Density: 78.1/km^{2} (202/sq mi)
- Time zone: UTC+01:00 (CET)
  - Summer (DST): UTC+02:00 (CEST)
- INSEE/Postal code: 71249 /71240
- ^{1} French Land Register data, which excludes lakes, ponds, glaciers > 1 km^{2} (0.386 sq mi or 247 acres) and river estuaries.

Laives (French pronunciation: [lɛv]) is a commune in the Saône-et-Loire department in the region of Bourgogne-Franche-Comté in eastern France.

== Geography ==
The river Grison forms most of the commune's western border, then flows into the Grosne, which forms the commune's northwestern border.

== See also ==
- Communes of the Saône-et-Loire department
