= Comics and Sequential Art =

Nonfiction book by Will Eisner

- Author: Will Eisner
- Language: English
- Subject: Comics
- Publisher: Poorhouse Press
- Publication date: 1985; 1990 (expanded edition)
- Publication place: United States
- Pages: 164 (expanded edition)
- Followed by: Graphic Storytelling and Visual Narrative

Comics and Sequential Art is a book by American cartoonist Will Eisner that analyzes the comics medium, published in 1985 and revised in 1990. It is based on a series of essays that appeared in The Spirit magazine, themselves based on Eisner's experience teaching a course on comics at the School of Visual Arts. It is not presented as a teaching guide, however, but as a series of demonstrations of principles and methods. A 1990 expanded edition of the book includes short sections on the print process and the use of computers in comics. Eisner followed with a companion volume, Graphic Storytelling and Visual Narrative, in 1996.

== Content ==
In contrast to earlier books on comics, which focused on specific aspects such as drawing anatomy, Eisner's book takes an overall approach, devoting different chapters to different aspects of comics. To demonstrate many of the concepts the book introduces, Eisner provides a ten-page adaptation of the "To be, or not to be..." soliloquy from Shakespeare's Hamlet. A revised edition included a chapter on computer techniques.

== Publication history ==
Since the 1970s Eisner had been lecturing on comics at the School of Visual Arts. He was unable to find a textbook that focused on theoretical aspects of comics, and began writing essays based on the subject for The Spirit magazine; these essays came to form the basis of Comics and Sequential Art.

== Legacy ==
Along with Scott McCloud's Understanding Comics (1993), Comics and Sequential Art is considered to form the foundations for formal comics studies in English. Eisner followed up the book in different ways: he expanded the "Expressive Anatomy" chapter into a book with the same title two decades later, and followed up the book itself with Graphic Storytelling and Visual Narrative in 1996.

== See also ==
- Comics studies
- Sequential art

== Works cited ==
- Heer, Jeet; Worcester, Kent (2009). "Introduction". In Heer, Jeet; Worcester, Kent (eds.). A Comics Studies Reader. University Press of Mississippi. pp. xi–xv. ISBN 978-1-60473-109-5.
- Holston, Alicia (2010). "A Librarian's Guide to the History of Graphic Novels". In Weiner, Robert G. (ed.). Graphic Novels and Comics in Libraries and Archives: Essays on Readers, Research, History and Cataloging. McFarland. pp. 9–16. ISBN 978-0-7864-5693-2.
- Schumacher, Michael (2010). Will Eisner: A Dreamer's Life in Comics. Bloomsbury Publishing. ISBN 978-1-60819-524-4.
