= Sequential art =

Sequence of images used for storytelling

In comics studies, sequential art is a term proposed by comics artist Will Eisner to describe art forms that use images deployed in a specific order for the purpose of graphic storytelling (i.e., narration of graphic stories) or conveying information. The best-known example of sequential art is comics.

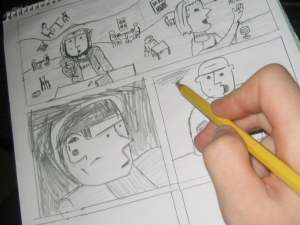
Although separated spatially on the page, the frames of this comic represent (among other transitions) the passage of time.

== Etymology ==
The term "sequential art" was coined in 1985 by comics artist Will Eisner in his book Comics and Sequential Art. Eisner analyzed this form into four elements: design, drawing, caricature, and writing.

Scott McCloud, another comics artist, elaborated the explanation further in his books Understanding Comics (1993) and Reinventing Comics (2000). In Understanding Comics, he notes that the movie roll, before it is being projected, arguably could be seen as a very slow comic.

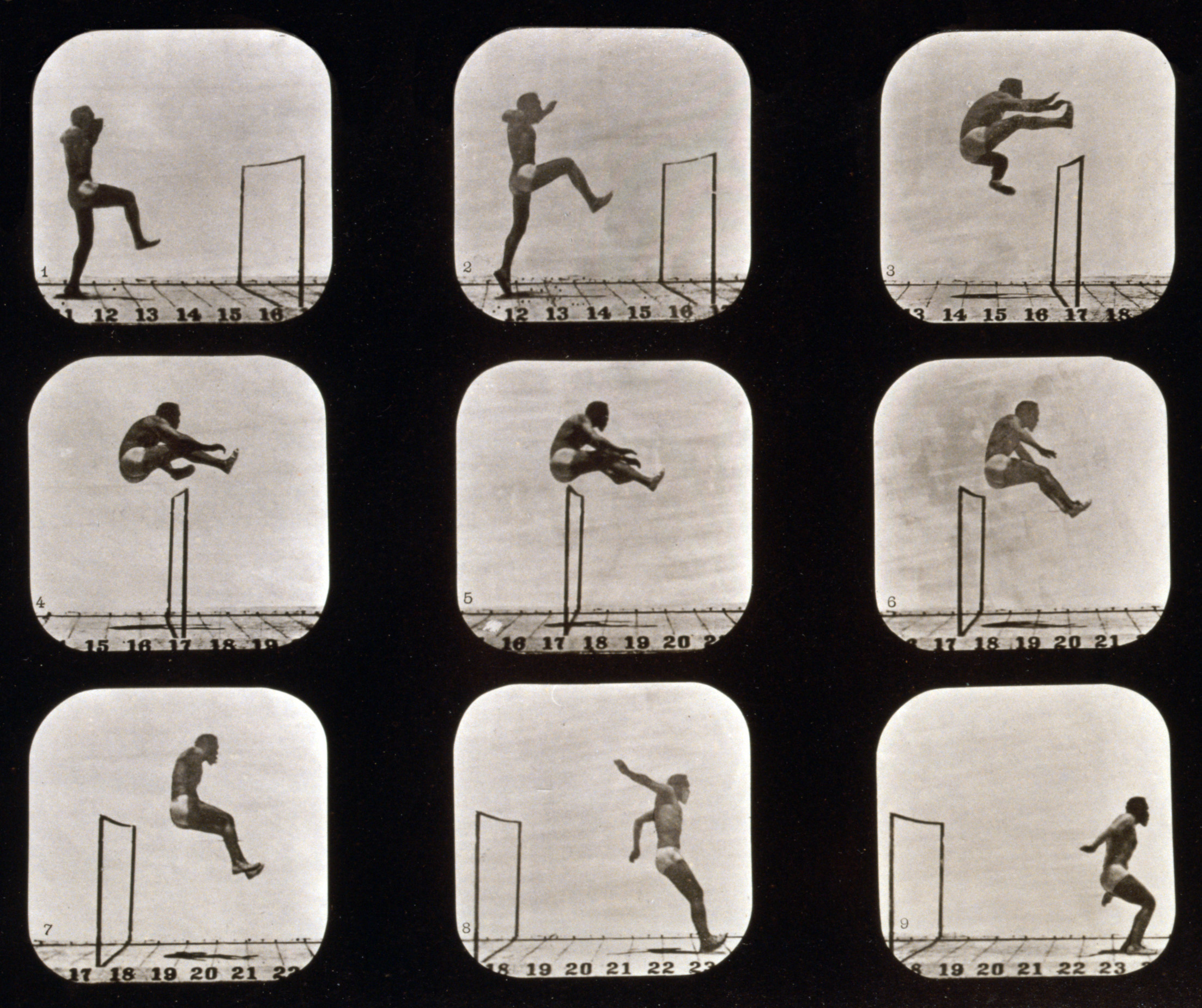
Eadweard Muybridge was interested in what closely-spaced sequential photography could show about motion; his works blur the line between science and art, although they are not proper comics.

Related terms include: comic books, visual narrative, graphic narrative, pictorial narrative, picto-narrative, sequential narrative, sequential pictorial narrative, sequential storytelling, graphic fiction, graphic literature, pictorial literature, sequential literature, and narrative illustration. The related term sequential sculpture has also been used.

== See also ==
- Bayeux Tapestry
- Biblia pauperum
- Glossary of comics terminology
- Multiliteracy
- Photo comics
- Sequart Organization
- Sequence (filmmaking)
- Trajan's Column
- Visual literacy
- Wordless novel
