= Will Eisner =

American cartoonist, writer and entrepreneur (1917–2005)

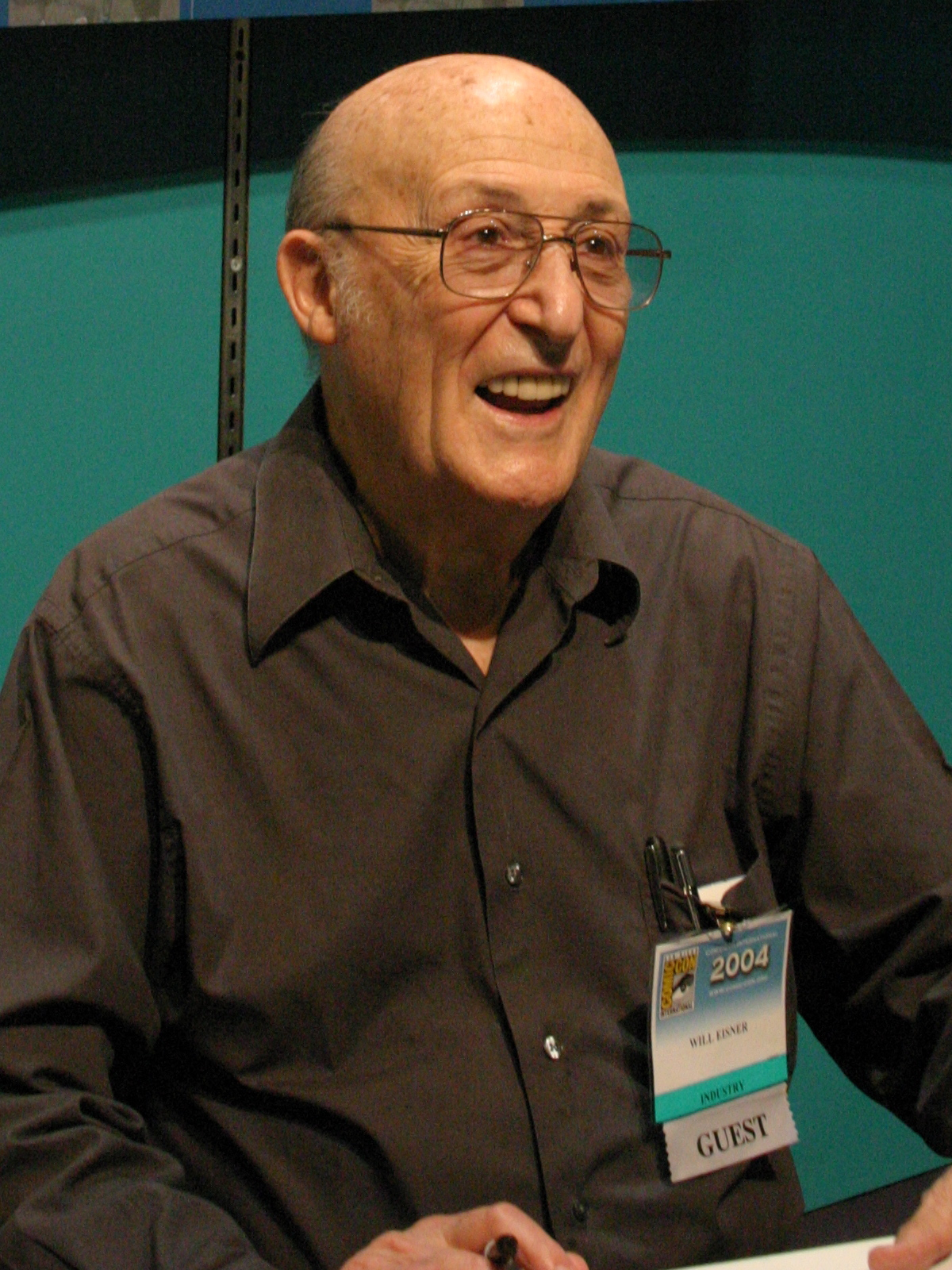
- Eisner in 2004
- Born: William Erwin Eisner; March 6, 1917 New York City, U.S.
- Died: January 3, 2005 (aged 87) Lauderdale Lakes, Florida, U.S.
- Areas: Cartoonist, Publisher
- Pseudonym: William Erwin Maxwell
- Notable works: The Spirit; A Contract with God; Comics and Sequential Art

William Erwin Eisner (/ˈaɪznər/ EYEZ-nər; March 6, 1917 – January 3, 2005) was an American cartoonist, writer, and entrepreneur. He was one of the earliest cartoonists to work in the American comic book industry, and his series The Spirit (1940–1952) was noted for its experiments in content and form. In 1978, he popularized the term "graphic novel" with the publication of his book A Contract with God. He was an early contributor to formal comics studies with his book Comics and Sequential Art (1985). The Eisner Award was named in his honor and is given to recognize achievements each year in the comics medium; he was one of the three inaugural inductees to the Will Eisner Comic Book Hall of Fame.

== 1917–1936: Early life ==
=== Family background ===
Eisner's father, Shmuel "Samuel" Eisner, was born to Galician Jewish parents on March 6, 1886, in Kolomyia, Austria-Hungary (present-day Ukraine), and was one of eleven children. He aspired to be an artist, and as a teenager painted murals for rich patrons and Catholic churches in Vienna. To avoid conscription in the army, he moved to New York before the outbreak of World War I. There he found getting work difficult, as his English skills were poor. He made what living he could painting backdrops for vaudeville and the Jewish theater.

Eisner's mother, Fannie Ingber, was born to Romanian Jewish parents on April 25, 1891, on a ship bound for the US. Her mother died on her tenth birthday and was quickly followed by her father. An older stepsister thereafter raised her and kept her so busy with chores that she had little time for socializing or schooling; she did what she could later in life to keep knowledge of her illiteracy from her children.

Shmuel and Fannie, who were distant relatives, met through family members. They had three children: son Will Erwin, born on his father's birthday in 1917; son Julian, born February 3, 1921; and daughter Rhoda, born November 2, 1929.

=== Early life ===
Wow, What a Magazine! No. 3 (Sept. 1936): Cover art by a teenage Eisner.

Eisner was born in Brooklyn. He grew up poor, and the family moved frequently. Young Eisner often got into physical confrontations when subjected to antisemitism from his schoolmates.

Young Eisner was tall and of sturdy build, but lacked athletic skills. He was a voracious consumer of pulp magazines and film, including avant-garde films such as those by Man Ray. To his mother's disappointment, Eisner had his father's interest in art, and his father encouraged him by buying him art supplies.

Eisner's mother frequently berated his father for not providing the family a better income, as he went from one job to another. Without success he also tried his hand at such ventures as a furniture retailer and a coat factory. The family situation was especially dire following the Wall Street crash of 1929 that marked the beginning of the Great Depression. In 1930, the situation was so desperate that Eisner's mother demanded that he, at thirteen, find some way to contribute to the family's income. He entered working life selling newspapers on street corners, a competitive job where the toughest boys fought for the best locations.

Eisner attended DeWitt Clinton High School. With influences that included the early 20th-century commercial artist J. C. Leyendecker, he drew for the school newspaper (The Clinton News), the literary magazine (The Magpie) and the yearbook (The Clintonian) and did stage design, leading him to consider doing that kind of work for theater. Upon graduation, he studied under Canadian artist George Brandt Bridgman for a year at the Art Students League of New York. Contacts made there led to a position as an advertising writer-cartoonist for the New York American newspaper. Eisner also drew $10-a-page illustrations for pulp magazines, including Western Sheriffs and Outlaws.

In 1936, high-school friend and fellow cartoonist Bob Kane, of future Batman fame, suggested that the 19-year-old Eisner try selling cartoons to the new comic book Wow, What A Magazine! "Comic books" at the time were tabloid-sized collections of comic strip reprints in color. By 1935, they had begun to include occasional new comic strip-like material. Wow editor Jerry Iger bought an Eisner adventure strip called Captain Scott Dalton, an H. Rider Haggard-styled hero who traveled the world after rare artifacts. Eisner subsequently wrote and drew the pirate strip "The Flame" and the secret agent strip "Harry Karry" for Wow as well.

Eisner said that on one occasion a man whom Eisner described as "a mob type straight out of Damon Runyon, complete with pinkie ring, broken nose, black shirt, and white tie, who claimed to have "exclusive distribution rights for all Brooklyn" asked Eisner to draw Tijuana bibles for $3 a page. Eisner said that he declined the offer; he described the decision as "one of the most difficult moral decisions of my life".

== 1936–1941: Comics industry and The Spirit ==
=== Eisner & Iger ===
Wow lasted four issues (cover-dated July–September and November 1936). After it ended, Eisner and Iger worked together producing and selling original comics material, anticipating that the well of available reprints would soon run dry, though their accounts of how their partnership was founded differ. One of the first such comic-book "packagers", their partnership was an immediate success, and the two soon had a stable of comics creators supplying work to Fox Comics, Fiction House, Quality Comics (for whom Eisner co-created such characters as Doll Man and Blackhawk), and others. Turning a profit of $1.50 a page, Eisner claimed that he "got very rich before I was 22," later detailing that in Depression-era 1939 alone, he and Iger "had split $25,000 between us", a considerable amount for the time.

Among the studio's products was a self-syndicated Sunday comic strip, Hawks of the Seas, that initially reprinted Eisner's old strip Wow, What A Magazine! feature "The Flame" and then continued it with new material. Eisner's original work even crossed the Atlantic, with Eisner drawing the new cover of the October 16, 1937, issue of Boardman Books' comic-strip reprint tabloid Okay Comics Weekly. Another Eisner & Iger product – created by Eisner, but soon left to his stable of assistants – was the 1938 short-form comedy strip Archie O'Toole.

In 1939, Eisner was commissioned to create Wonder Man for Victor Fox, an accountant who had previously worked at DC Comics and was becoming a comic book publisher himself. Following Fox's instructions to create a Superman-type character, and using the pen name Willis, Eisner wrote and drew the first issue of Wonder Comics. Eisner said in interviews throughout his later life that he had protested the derivative nature of the character and story, and that when subpoenaed after National Periodical Publications, the company that would evolve into DC Comics, sued Fox, alleging Wonder Man was an illegal copy of Superman, Eisner testified that this was so, undermining Fox's case; Eisner even depicts himself doing so in his semi-autobiographical graphic novel The Dreamer. However, a transcript of the proceeding, uncovered by comics historian Ken Quattro in 2010, indicates Eisner in fact supported Fox and claimed Wonder Man as an original Eisner creation.

=== The Spirit ===
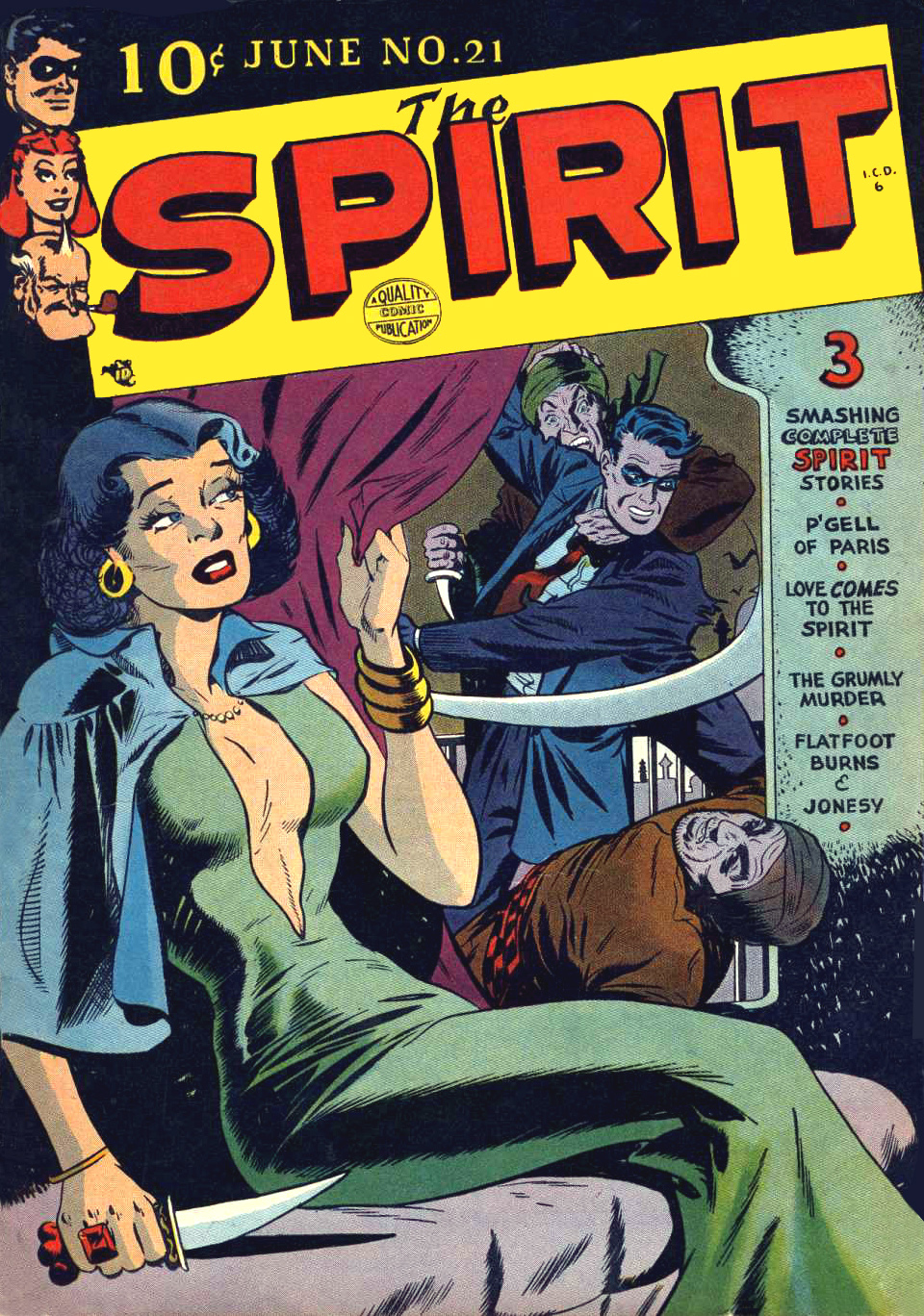
Eisner's cover for The Spirit (Quality Comics) #21, June 1950.

In "late '39, just before Christmas time," Eisner recalled in 1979, Quality Comics publisher Everett M. "Busy" Arnold "came to me and said that the Sunday newspapers were looking for a way of getting into this comic book boom," In a 2004 interview, he elaborated on that meeting:

"Busy" invited me up for lunch one day and introduced me to Henry Martin [sales manager of The Des Moines Register and Tribune Syndicate, who] said, "The newspapers in this country, particularly the Sunday papers, are looking to compete with comics books, and they would like to get a comic-book insert into the newspapers." ... Martin asked if I could do it. ... It meant that I'd have to leave Eisner & Iger [which] was making money; we were very profitable at that time and things were going very well. A hard decision. Anyway, I agreed to do the Sunday comic book and we started discussing the deal [which] was that we'd be partners in the 'Comic Book Section,' as they called it at that time. And also, I would produce two other magazines in partnership with Arnold.

Eisner negotiated an agreement with the syndicate in which Arnold would copyright The Spirit, but "[w]ritten down in the contract I had with 'Busy' Arnold —and this contract exists today as the basis for my copyright ownership—Arnold agreed that it was my property. They agreed that if we had a split-up in any way, the property would revert to me on that day that happened. My attorney went to 'Busy' Arnold and his family, and they all signed a release agreeing that they would not pursue the question of ownership". This would include the eventual backup features "Mr. Mystic" and "Lady Luck".

Selling his share of their firm to Iger, who would continue to package comics as the S.M. Iger Studio and as Phoenix Features through 1955, for $20,000, Eisner left to create The Spirit. "They gave me an adult audience", Eisner said in 1997, "and I wanted to write better things than superheroes. Comic books were a ghetto. I sold my part of the enterprise to my associate and then began The Spirit. They wanted an heroic character, a costumed character. They asked me if he'd have a costume. And I put a mask on him and said, 'Yes, he has a costume!'"

The Spirit, an initially eight- and later seven-page urban-crimefighter series, ran with the initial backup features "Mr. Mystic" and "Lady Luck" in a 16-page Sunday supplement (colloquially called "The Spirit Section") that was eventually distributed in 20 newspapers with a combined circulation of as many as five million copies. It premiered June 2, 1940, and continued through 1952. Eisner has cited the Spirit story "Gerhard Shnobble" as a particular favorite, as it was one of his first attempts at injecting his personal point of view into the series.

== 1942–1970s: Military publications, The Spirit, and new endeavors ==
=== World War II and Joe Dope ===
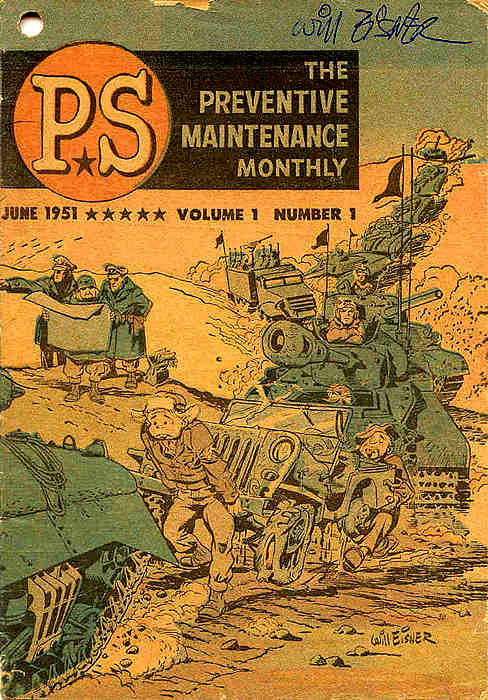
Premiere issue of the U.S. Army publication PS (June 1951), designed to be a "postscript" to related publications. Art by Eisner.

Eisner was drafted into the U.S. Army in "late '41, early '42" and then "had about another half-year which the government gave me to clean up my affairs before going off" to fight in World War II. He was assigned to the camp newspaper at Aberdeen Proving Ground, where "there was also a big training program there, so I got involved in the use of comics for training. ... I finally became a warrant officer, which involved taking a test – that way you didn't have to go through Officer Candidate School."

En route to Washington, D.C., he stopped at the Holabird Ordnance Depot in Baltimore, where a mimeographed publication titled Army Motors was put together. "Together with the people there ... I helped develop its format. I began doing cartoons – and we began fashioning a magazine that had the ability to talk to the G.I.s in their language. So I began to use comics as a teaching tool, and when I got to Washington, they assigned me to the business of teaching – or selling – preventive maintenance."

Eisner then created the educational comic strip and titular character Joe Dope for Army Motors, and spent four years working in The Pentagon editing the ordnance magazine Firepower and doing "all the general illustrations – that is, cartoons" for Army Motors. He continued to work on that and its 1950 successor magazine, PS, The Preventive Maintenance Monthly, until 1971. Eisner also illustrated an official Army pamphlet in 1968 and 1969 called The M16A1 Rifle specifically for troops in Vietnam to help minimize the M16 rifle's notorious early reliability problems with proper maintenance. Eisner's style helped to popularize these officially-distributed works in order to better educate soldiers on equipment maintenance.

While Eisner's later graphic novels were entirely his own work, he had a studio working under his supervision on The Spirit. In particular, letterer Abe Kanegson came up with the distinctive lettering style which Eisner himself would later imitate in his book-length works, and Kanegson would often rewrite Eisner's dialogue.

Eisner's most trusted assistant on The Spirit, however, was Jules Feiffer, later a renowned cartoonist, playwright and screenwriter in his own right. Eisner later said of their memories of their working methods on the feature, "You should hear me and Jules Feiffer going at it in a room. 'No, you designed the splash page for this one, then you wrote the ending – I came up with the idea for the story, and you did it up to this point, then I did the next page and this sequence here and...' And I'll be swearing up and down that 'he' wrote the ending on that one. We never agree."

So trusted were Eisner's assistants that Eisner allowed them to "ghost" The Spirit from the time that he was drafted into the U.S. Army in 1942 until his return to civilian life in 1945. The primary wartime artists were the uncredited Lou Fine and Jack Cole, with future Kid Colt, Outlaw artist Jack Keller drawing backgrounds. Ghost writers included Manly Wade Wellman and William Woolfolk. The wartime ghosted stories have been reprinted in DC Comics' hardcover collections The Spirit Archives Vols. 5 to 11 (2001–2003), spanning July 1942 to December 1945.

=== Post-war comics ===
On Eisner's return from service and resumption of his role in the studio, he created the bulk of the Spirit stories on which his reputation was solidified. The post-war years also saw him attempt to launch the comic-strip/comic-book series Baseball, John Law, Kewpies, and Nubbin the Shoeshine Boy; none succeeded, but some material was recycled into The Spirit.

The Spirit ceased publishing in 1952. During the 1960s and 1970s, various publishers reprinted the adventures, often with covers by Eisner and with a few new stories from him.

=== American Visuals Corporation ===
During his World War II military service, Eisner had introduced the use of comics for training personnel in the publication Army Motors, for which he created the cautionary bumbling soldier Joe Dope, who illustrated various methods of preventive maintenance of various military equipment and weapons. In 1948, while continuing to do The Spirit and seeing television and other post-war trends eat away at the readership base of newspapers, he formed the American Visuals Corporation in order to produce instructional materials for the government, related agencies, and businesses.

One of his longest-running jobs was PS, The Preventive Maintenance Monthly, a digest sized magazine with comic book elements that he started for the Army in 1951 and continued to work on until the 1970s with Klaus Nordling, Mike Ploog, and other artists. In addition, Eisner produced other military publications such as the graphic manual in 1969, The M-16A1 Rifle: Operation and Preventative Maintenance, which was distributed along with cleaning kits to address serious reliability concerns with the M16 rifle during the Vietnam War.

Other clients of his Connecticut-based company included RCA Records, the Baltimore Colts football team, and New York Telephone.

== 1970s–2005: Godfather of the graphic novel ==
=== Graphic novels ===
Eisner credited the 1971 Comic Art Convention (CAC) for his return to comics. In a 1983 interview with CAC organizer Phil Seuling, he said, "I came back into the field because of you. I remember you calling me in New London, where I was sitting there as chairman of the board of Croft Publishing Co. My secretary said, 'There's a Mr. Seuling on the phone and he's talking about a comics convention. What is that?' She said, 'I didn't know you were a cartoonist, Mr. Eisner.' 'Oh, yes,' I said, 'secretly; I'm a closet cartoonist.' I came down and was stunned at the existence of the whole world. ... That was a world that I had left, and I found it very exciting, very stimulating".

Eisner later elaborated about meeting underground comics creators and publishers, including Denis Kitchen:

I went down to the convention, which was being held in one of the hotels in New York, and there was a group of guys with long hair and scraggly beards, who had been turning out what spun as literature, really popular 'gutter' literature if you will, but pure literature. And they were taking on illegal [sic] subject matter that no comics had ever dealt with before. ... I came away from that recognizing that a revolution had occurred then, a turning point in the history of this medium. ... I reasoned that the 13-year-old kids that I'd been writing to back in the 1940s were no longer 13-year-old kids, they were now 30, 40 years old. They would want something more than two heroes, two supermen, crashing against each other. I began working on a book that dealt with a subject that I felt had never been tried by comics before, and that was man's relationship with God. That was the book A Contract with God....

Trade paperback edition of A Contract with God; the concurrent 1,500-copy hardcover release did not use the term "graphic novel" on its cover.

In the late 1970s, Eisner turned his attention to longer storytelling forms. A Contract with God: and Other Tenement Stories (Baronet Books, October 1978) is an early example of an American graphic novel, combining thematically linked short stories into a single square-bound volume. Eisner continued with a string of graphic novels that tell the history of New York's immigrant communities, particularly Jews, including The Building, A Life Force, Dropsie Avenue and To the Heart of the Storm. He continued producing new books into his seventies and eighties, at an average rate of nearly one a year. Each of these books was done twice – once as a rough version to show editor Dave Schreiner, then as a second, finished version incorporating suggested changes.

Some of his last work was the retelling in sequential art of novels and myths, including Moby-Dick. In 2002, at the age of 85, he published Sundiata, based on the part-historical, part-mythical stories of a West African king, "The Lion of Mali". Fagin the Jew is an account of the life of Dickens's character Fagin, in which Eisner tries to get past the stereotyped portrait of Fagin in Oliver Twist.

His last graphic novel, The Plot: The Secret Story of The Protocols of the Elders of Zion, an account of the making, and refutation, of the antisemitic hoax The Protocols of the Elders of Zion, was completed shortly before his death and published in 2005.

In 2008, Will Eisner's The Spirit: A Pop-Up Graphic Novel was published, with Bruce Foster as paper engineer.

=== Teaching ===
In his later years especially, Eisner was a frequent lecturer about the craft and uses of sequential art. He taught at the School of Visual Arts in New York City, where he published Will Eisner's Gallery, a collection of work by his students and wrote two books based on these lectures, Comics and Sequential Art and Graphic Storytelling and Visual Narrative, which are widely used by students of cartooning. In 2002, Eisner participated in the Will Eisner Symposium of the 2002 University of Florida Conference on Comics and Graphic Novels. Before his death, Eisner worked on and outlined a third book, Expressive Anatomy for Comics and Narrative, but would die before its completion. Editor Denis Kitchen and Eisner's family would decide that the book was near completion, and had cartoonist Peter Poplaski finish inking Eisner's art for publication in 2008.

== Death ==
Eisner died January 3, 2005, in Lauderdale Lakes, Florida, of complications from a quadruple bypass surgery performed December 22, 2004. DC Comics held a memorial service in Manhattan's Lower East Side, a neighborhood Eisner often visited in his work, at the Angel Orensanz Foundation on Norfolk Street.

Eisner was survived by his wife, Ann Weingarten Eisner, and their son, John. In the introduction to the 2001 reissue of A Contract with God, Eisner revealed that the inspiration for the title story grew out of the 1970 death of his leukemia-stricken teenaged daughter, Alice, next to whom he is buried. Until then, only Eisner's closest friends were aware of his daughter's life and death.

== Awards and honors ==
Eisner has been recognized for his work with the National Cartoonists Society Comic Book Award for 1967, 1968, 1969, 1987 and 1988, as well as its Story Comic Book Award in 1979, and its Reuben Award in 1998. In 1975, he was awarded the Inkpot Award and the second Grand Prix de la ville d'Angoulême.

He was inducted into the Academy of Comic Book Arts Hall of Fame in 1971, and the Jack Kirby Hall of Fame in 1987. The following year, the Will Eisner Comic Industry Awards were established in his honor. In 2015, Eisner was posthumously elected to the Society of Illustrators Hall of Fame.

Comics by Will Eisner are archived in the James Branch Cabell Library of Virginia Commonwealth University. VCU's James Branch Cabell Library has served as the repository for the Will Eisner Comic Industry Awards since 2005. Each year following Comic-Con, nominated and award-winning titles are donated to the library's Special Collections and Archives and made available to researchers and visitors. Approximately 1,000 comic books, graphic novels, archival editions, scholarly titles, and journals are included in the VCU library's expansive Comic Arts Collection.

On the 94th anniversary of Eisner's birth, in 2011, Google used an image featuring the Spirit as its logo.

With Jack Kirby, Robert Crumb, Harvey Kurtzman, Gary Panter, and Chris Ware, Eisner was among the artists honored in the exhibition "Masters of American Comics" at the Jewish Museum in New York City, from September 16, 2006, to January 28, 2007. In honor of Eisner's centennial in 2017, Denis Kitchen and John Lind co-curated the largest retrospective exhibitions of Will Eisner's original artwork, shown simultaneously at The Society of Illustrators in New York City and Le Musée de la Bande Dessinée in Angoulême, France. Both exhibitions were titled Will Eisner Centennial Celebration and collectively over 400 original pieces were included. A catalogue of the same name was released by Dark Horse Books and nominated for multiple Eisner Awards in 2018.

== Original books ==
- Odd Facts. Tempo Star Books. 1975. ISBN 0-441-60918-X.
- A Contract with God. Baronet Books. 1978. ISBN 0-89437-035-9.
  - DC Comics reissue ISBN 1-56389-674-5
- Eisner, Will (1983). Life on Another Planet (Signal From Space). Kitchen Sink Press. ISBN 0-87816-370-0.
- Eisner, Will (1985). Comics and Sequential Art. Poorhouse Press. ISBN 0-9614728-0-4.
- Eisner, Will (1986). New York: The Big City (softcover ed.). Kitchen Sink Press. ISBN 0-87816-020-5.
  - Hardcover reprint 2000 ISBN 1-56389-682-6
- Eisner, Will (1986). The Dreamer. DC Comics. ISBN 1-56389-678-8.
- Eisner, Will (1987). The Building. Kitchen Sink Press. ISBN 0-87816-024-8.
- Eisner, Will (1988). A Life Force. Kitchen Sink Press. ISBN 0-87816-038-8.
- Art of Will Eisner (2nd ed.). Kitchen Sink. 1989. ISBN 0-87816-076-0.
- Eisner, Will (1991). To the Heart of the Storm. DC Comics. ISBN 1-56389-679-6.
- Eisner, Will (1991). The Will Eisner Reader. Kitchen Sink Press. ISBN 0-87816-129-5.
- Eisner, Will (1993). Invisible People. Kitchen Sink Press. ISBN 0-87816-208-9.
- Eisner, Will (1995). Dropsie Avenue. Kitchen Sink Press. ISBN 0-87816-348-4.
- Will Eisner Sketchbook (softcover ed.). Kitchen Sink. 1995. ISBN 0-87816-399-9.
  - Hardcover edition ISBN 0-87816-400-6
- Eisner, Will (1996). Graphic Storytelling and Visual Narrative. Poorhouse Press. ISBN 0-9614728-3-9.
- Grimm, Jacob; Grimm, Wilhelm (1996). The Princess and the Frog. ISBN 1-56163-244-9.
- Eisner, Will (1998). A Family Matter. Kitchen Sink Press. ISBN 0-87816-621-1.
- Eisner, Will (2000). Last Day in Vietnam. Dark Horse Comics. ISBN 1-56971-500-9.
- Eisner, Will; Saavedra, Miguel de Cervantes (2000). The Last Knight. ISBN 1-56163-251-1.
- Eisner, Will (2000). Minor Miracles. DC Comics. ISBN 1-56389-751-2.
- Will Eisner's Shop Talk. Dark Horse Comics. 2001. ISBN 1-56971-536-X.
- Eisner, Will (2002). The Name of the Game. DC Comics. ISBN 1-56389-865-9.
- Eisner, Will (2002). Sundiata: A Legend of Africa. NBM Publishing. ISBN 978-1561633326.
- Eisner, Will (2003). Fagin the Jew. Doubleday. ISBN 0-385-51009-8.
- The Name of the Game. DC Comics. 2003. ISBN 1-56389-869-1.
- Will Eisner's John Law: Dead Man Walking (softcover ed.). IDW. 2004. ISBN 1-932382-27-5.
  - Hardcover edition ISBN 1-932382-83-6
- The Plot: The Secret Story of The Protocols of the Elders of Zion. WW Norton. 2005. ISBN 0-393-06045-4.
