= Origin story =

Plot device

In fiction, an origin story is an account or backstory revealing how a character or group of people become a protagonist or antagonist.

In American comic books, it also refers to how characters gained their superpowers and/or the circumstances under which they became superheroes or supervillains. In order to keep their characters current, comic book companies, as well as cartoon companies, game companies, children's show companies, and toy companies, frequently rewrite the origins of their oldest characters. This goes from adding details that do not contradict earlier facts to a totally new origin which makes it seem that it is an altogether different character.

A pourquoi story, also dubbed an "origin story", is also used in mythology, referring to narratives of how a world began, how creatures and plants came into existence, and why certain things in the cosmos have certain yet distinct qualities.

== Critical explorations of the origin story ==
In The Superhero Reader (nominated for a 2014 Eisner Award for Best Scholarly/Academic Work), edited by Charles Hatfield (Professor at University of Connecticut), Jeet Heer (Toronto-based journalist), and Kent Worcester (Professor of Political Science at Marymount Manhattan College), the editors wrote in "Section One: Historical Considerations": "Almost all superheroes have an origin story: a bedrock account of the transformative events that set the protagonist apart from ordinary humanity. If not a prerequisite for the superhero genre, the origin... is certainly a prominent and popular trope that recurs so frequently as to offer clues to the nature of this narrative tradition. To read stories about destroyed worlds, murdered parents, genetic mutations, and mysterious power-giving wizards is to realize the degree to which the superhero genre is about transformation, about identity, about difference, and about the tension between psychological rigidity and a flexible and fluid sense of human nature. ... When surveying the superhero genre, preliminary questions often turn to the problem of roots". The book has a wealth of pertinent bibliographies.

English professors Alex Romagnoli and Gian S. Pagnucci, of Indiana University of Pennsylvania, discuss in their book Enter the Superheroes: American Values, Culture, and the Canon of Superhero Literature "the nature of superhero origin stories and how the writing of these origin stories helps make superhero narratives a unique literary genre". For example, they wrote that "superheroes get very complicated when it comes to their histories, but one part of their stories remains forever constant and important. Even more than 'death' stories, crossovers, event stories, and attire changes, origin stories are the core of superheroes' existences. Origins not only reflect the sociohistorical contexts in which heroes were created, but they also reflect a culture's understanding of what makes superheroes storytelling unique vehicles". Thereafter, Romagnoli and Pagnucci go on to explain why the origin story is as important to the audience as to the generations of writers who continue heroic tales.

Randy Duncan (comics scholar and professor of communication, Henderson State University, Arkadelphia, Arkansas) and Matthew J. Smith (Department of Communication, Wittenberg University, Springfield, Ohio) use the origin story of Spider-Man as an example of how a character can be created by the persistence of a writer who has definite preferences in creating a character's personality, even if the publisher resists: "It is difficult to discern which is more often told: Spider-Man's origin or the tales told around that origin. All reveal fascinating aspects of a teenage loner fatefully 'bitten by a radioactive spider' to find himself with 'the proportionate strength and agility of an arachnid'". Duncan and Smith explain how Stan Lee butted heads with publisher Martin Goodman, who worried about an "ick factor", but Lee prevailed. The authors also said that "the entire Spider-Man concept resonates with the primary attributes of many genres and traditions. Like a heady puree of [Mary] Shelley's Frankenstein, Bob Kane's Batman, and Franz Kafka's Metamorphosis, Spider-Man's origin invokes gothic and crime fiction motifs like the ostracized genius, doomed loved ones, the misuse or misfiring of science, the gritty noir city, the driven vigilante, and the fateful 'return of the repressed'". The authors proceed to investigate these various issues of the origin story.

== See also ==
- Backstory
- Continuity
- Origin myth
- Prequel
- Reboot
- Retcon
