= Government comics =

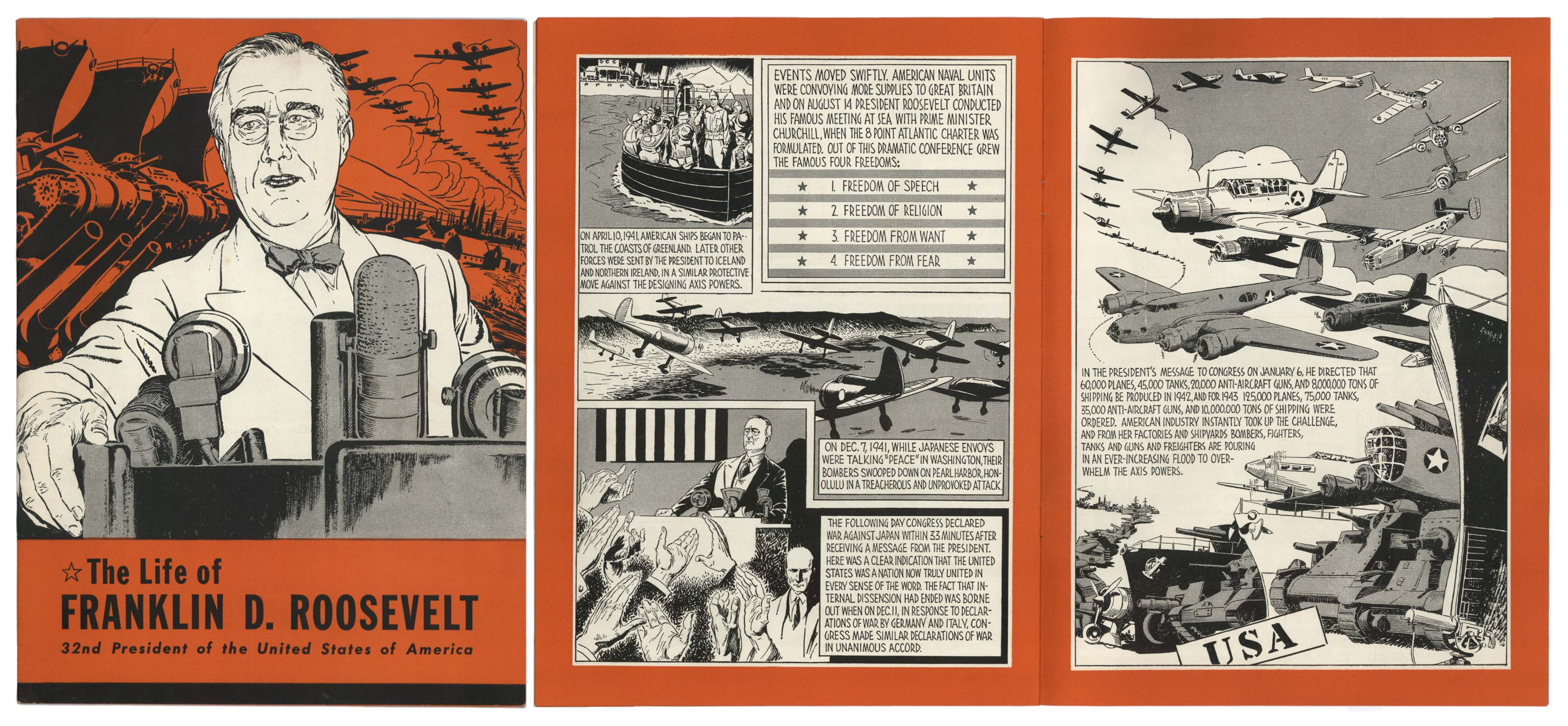
The Life of Franklin D Roosevelt is a 16-page comic book created by the Office of War Information in 1943. A large number of these US government comics were developed, illustrated and published with the intention of educating citizens and military personnel.

Government comics include informational material produced in comic book-format by governments and their affiliated bodies. These works fulfill a wide variety of purposes often seen in government publications, primarily educating the public about government programs or lifestyle choices the government wants to encourage. Richard L. Graham examines and dissects the United States' government comics in Government Issue: Comics for the People, 1940s-2000s.

== History ==
=== History of implementation ===
In 1942, the Advertising Research Foundation conducted a study which found that "for adults, the most widely read non-advertising feature in newspapers was the comic strip." In an effort to boost public support for ongoing foreign policies, the government looked to this study, and tried to persuade and suggest themes and ideas of soldiers and America as a whole, for artists to include in their weekly publications. Government officials understood that comics "have the capacity to simplify even the most crucial civic issues and shape public opinion." Not being satisfied with the images found in local papers and national magazines, the government went a step farther and began publishing their own comics. The intentions behind these publications were to "reinforce the government's expectations about the preferred cultural identity of the country." When examining government issued comics, it is important to realize that they give us an idea of the government's "idealized or assumed 'American experience'." The themes and ideas found within the comics written and distributed by the government "express the government's attempts to recognize and address the nation's attitudes and concerns."

=== Artists ===
These comics were mainly printed by federal agencies, but the government also commissioned works printed by Marvel, Harvey, and DC Comics. Some of the more well known artists within the comic world were also an integral part of creating and popularizing government issued comics. Will Eisner, an army veteran, created the character "Joe Dope", and contributed to the creation of PS, The Preventive Maintenance Monthly, which published illustrated pamphlets to complement other army publications. Before he was Dr. Seuss, Theodor Seuss Geisel also wrote and drew for the government. After becoming a captain in the army, Geisel worked in the animation branch, "where he wrote episodes of Private Snafu, a series of cartoon shorts for soldiers." Along with Munro Leaf, Geisel created an illustrated pamphlet for the army, which addressed the problems of malaria. Another famous artist commissioned by the government was Walt Disney. While Walt Disney Studios in California "became extensive 'war plants', housing mountains of munitions", artists were also developing characters for the comic Winter Draws On, a manual of sorts, for the United States Army Air Forces.

=== Distribution and target audience ===
These comics were "distributed at schools, civic events, and recruiting offices; they were inserted in local newspapers and national magazines", and can be found online on official government sites. The target audience for these comics included "women, children, workers, ethnic groups, and immigrants." The Federal Civil Defense Administration "produced comics designed to teach children how to survive everything from natural disasters—such as fires or earthquakes—to an atomic holocaust." By addressing the children, they could then in turn "get the word out to their parents about what families could do to protect themselves: build home shelters, stockpile canned goods and bottled water, learn first aid, and drop to the ground if they happened to get caught outside during an atomic blast." One example of these targeting tactics is Bert the Turtle, "likely the most famous pop icon of the Atomic Age", from the comic Duck and Cover. "The strategy behind Bert was to have a cartoon animal stand-in soften the blow when a topic was too scary to deal with directly."

== Examples of government comics ==
=== Coming Home ===
Coming Home is a graphic novel written by Sid Jacobson and Ernie Colón, published by the Ceridian Corporation in 2008. It is intended for educational purposes for military members, veterans, and family members. The novel centers around three main characters, each previously active-duty members in the military dealing with the transition of coming back home. The struggles of the transition from combat back to family life are shown through each of the character's individual struggles.

=== Preparedness 101: Zombie Pandemic ===
In Preparedness 101: Zombie Pandemic, the CDC frames a real survival lesson in the entertaining zombie narrative. The story depicts a zombie apocalypse from the perspective of two residents of an unnamed town in southeast America, with an interlude showing the Centers for Disease Control's attempts to counter the pandemic. The comic utilizes the zombie narrative's ability to "fulfill survivalist fantasies."

== See also ==
- U.S. Government Informational Comics
- United States PSYOP Comics
