= Comics studies =

Academic study of comics and graphic novels

Comics studies (also comic art studies, sequential art studies or graphic narrative studies) is an academic field that focuses on comics and sequential art. Although comics and graphic novels have been generally dismissed as less relevant pop culture texts, scholars in fields such as semiotics, aesthetics, sociology, composition studies and cultural studies are now re-considering comics and graphic novels as complex texts deserving of serious scholarly study.

Not to be confused with the technical aspects of comics creation, comics studies exists only with the creation of comics theory—which approaches comics critically as an art—and the writing of comics historiography (the study of the history of comics). Comics theory has significant overlap with the philosophy of comics, i.e., the study of the ontology, epistemology and aesthetics of comics, the relationship between comics and other art forms, and the relationship between text and image in comics.

Comics studies is also interrelated with comics criticism, the analysis and evaluation of comics and the comics medium.

Matthew Smith and Randy Duncan's 2017 book The Secret Origins of Comics Studies contains a useful overview of early scholarship on comics with standout chapters by Ian Horton, Barbara Postema, Ann Miller, and Ian Gordon. Frederick Luis Aldama's 2019 book Oxford Handbook of Comic Book Studies also contains a wealth of articles on approaches to comics studies and a useful history of the field by Ian Gordon.

== Theorizing comics ==
Although there has been the occasional investigation of comics as a valid art form, specifically in Gilbert Seldes' The 7 Lively Arts (1924), Martin Sheridan's Comics and Their Creators (1942), and David Kunzle's The Early Comic Strip: Narrative Strips and Picture Stories in the European Broadsheet from c. 1450 to 1825 (1973), contemporary Anglophone comics studies in North America can be said to have burst onto the academic scene with both Will Eisner's Comics and Sequential Art in 1985 and Scott McCloud's Understanding Comics in 1993. Continental comics studies can trace its roots back to the pioneering work of semioticians such as Roland Barthes (particularly his 1964 essay "Rhétorique de l'image", published in English as "Rhetoric of the Image" in the anthology Image—Music—Text) and Umberto Eco (particularly his 1964 book Apocalittici e integrati [Apocalypse Postponed]). These works were the first attempts at a general system of comics semiotics.

More recently, analysis of comics have begun to be undertaken by cognitive scientists, the most prominent being Neil Cohn, who has used tools from linguistics to detail the theoretical structure of comics' underlying "visual language", and has also used psychological experimentation from cognitive neuroscience to test these theories in actual comprehension. This work has suggested similarities between the way that the brain processes language and the way it processes sequential images. Cohn's theories are not universally accepted, with other scholars like Thierry Groensteen, Hannah Miodrag, and Barbara Postema offering alternative understandings.

=== Defining comics ===
"Comics ... are sometimes four-legged and sometimes two-legged and sometimes fly and sometimes don't ... to employ a metaphor as mixed as the medium itself, defining comics entails cutting a Gordian-knotted enigma wrapped in a mystery ..."

— R. C. Harvey, 2001

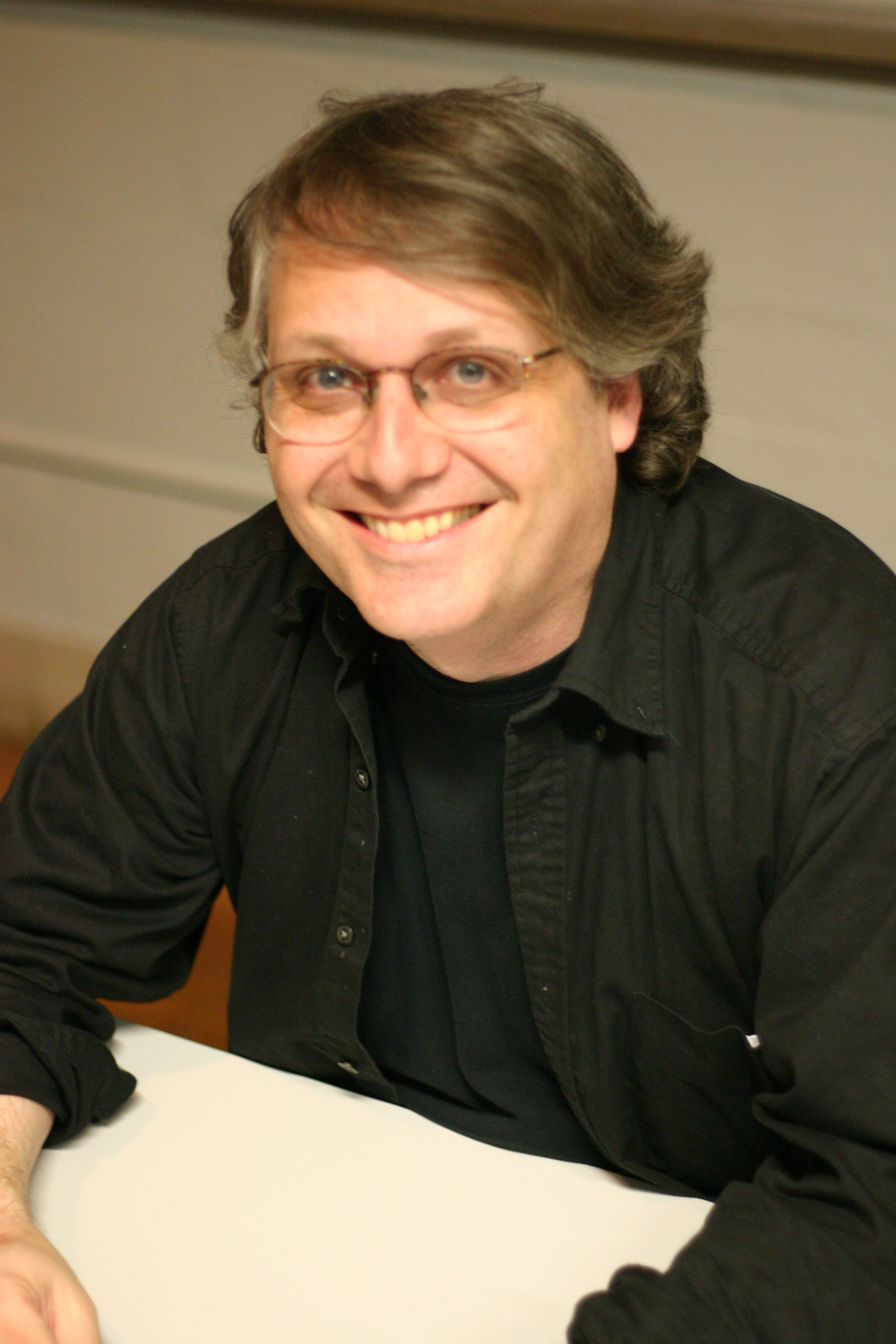
Cartoonist and comics theorist Scott McCloud

Similar to the problems of defining literature and film, no consensus has been reached on a definition of the comics medium, and attempted definitions and descriptions have fallen prey to numerous exceptions. Theorists such as Rodolphe Töpffer, R. C. Harvey, Will Eisner, David Carrier, Alain Rey, and Lawrence Grove emphasize the combination of text and images, though there are prominent examples of pantomime comics throughout its history. Other critics, such as Thierry Groensteen and Scott McCloud, have emphasized the primacy of sequences of images. Towards the close of the 20th century, different cultures' discoveries of each other's comics traditions, the rediscovery of forgotten early comics forms, and the rise of new forms made defining comics a more complicated task.

=== Composition studies ===
In the field of composition studies, an interest in comics and graphic novels is growing, partially due to the work of comics theorists but also due to composition studies' growing focus on multimodality and visual rhetoric. Composition studies theorists are looking at comics as sophisticated texts, and sites of complex literacy.

Gunther Kress defines multimodality as "the use of several semiotic modes in the design of a semiotic product or event, together with the particular way in which these mode are combined" or, more simply as "any text whose meanings are realized through more than one semiotic code".

Kristie S. Fleckenstein sees the relationship between image and text as "mutually constitutive, mutually infused", a relationship she names "imageword". Fleckenstein sees "imageword" as offering "a double vision of writing-reading based on [the] fusion of image and word, a double vision of literacy".

Dale Jacobs sees the reading of comics as a form of "multimodal literacy or multiliteracy, rather than as a debased form of print literacy". According to Jacobs, comics can help educators to move "toward attending to multimodal literacies" that "shift our focus from print only to multiple modalities". He encourages educators to embrace a pedagogy that will give students skills to effectively negotiate these multiple modalities.

=== Comics historiography ===
Comics historiography (the study of the history of comics) studies the historical process through which comics became an autonomous art medium and an integral part of culture. An area of study is premodern sequential art; some scholars such as Scott McCloud consider Egyptian paintings and pre-Columbian American picture manuscripts to be the very first form of comics and sequential art. Another area of study is the 20th-century emergence of the subculture of comics reading, comic book collecting and comicphilia, the passionate interest in comic books. A person with a passionate interest in comics is informally called a comicphile or comics buff.

The first attempts at comics historiography began in the United States in the 1940s with the work of Thomas Craven, Martin Sheridan, and Coulton Waugh. It was not until the mid-1960s, with the publication of Jules Feiffer's The Great Comic Book Heroes, that the field began to take root. Historiography became an accepted practice in the 1970s with the work of Maurice Horn, Jim Steranko, Ron Goulart, Bill Blackbeard, and Martin Williams. The late 1990s saw a wave of books celebrating American comics' centennial. Other notable writers on these topics include Will Jacobs, Gerard Jones, Rick Marschall, and R. C. Harvey. The 1990s also saw a growth of scholarly work on comics with new books from academics such as Martin Barker, David Kunzle, Thomas Inge, Joseph "Rusty" Witek, and Ian Gordon.

== Educational institutions ==
Comics studies is becoming increasingly more common at academic institutions across the world. Some notable examples include: Ohio State University, University of Florida, University of Toronto, University of California Santa Cruz, and San Diego State University, among others.

Beside formal programs and degrees, it is common to see individual courses dedicated to comics and graphic novels in many educational institutions. One of the most notable examples is Boğaziçi University in Istanbul, Turkey: Gazi Mehmet Emin Adanalı is offering several comics courses at Boğaziçi University since 2010 in the Western Literatures and Languages Department that include the history of comics, comics theory, advanced comics readings, and also comics adaptations in the Film and Media Studies Institute . These rigorous, demanding and comprehensive courses are available to all students including those in the postgraduate and doctorate studies, also to international ones through formal exchange programs with other universities.

Sol M. Davidson's New York University thesis, Culture and the Comic Strips, earned him the first PhD in comics in 1959.

In France, Jean-Christophe Menu was awarded a Doctorate in Art and Art Sciences in 2011 from Université Paris 1 Panthéon-Sorbonne after defending his thesis The Comics and its Double: Language and Frontiers of Comics: Practical, Theoretical and Editorial Prospects.

In 2012, the University of Oregon offered the first Comics and Cartoon Studies minor in the United States.

=== In the United Kingdom ===
In Britain, growing interest in comics has led to the establishment of a center for comics studies, the Scottish Centre for Comics Studies (SCCS) at the University of Dundee in Scotland, launched 2014, and research is also done at the Comics Research Hub at the University of the Arts London, launched 2015.

Teesside University began offering a BA in Comics and Graphic Novels in 2014, as well as an MA in Comics from 2018. They have since appointed a team of renowned comics practitioners including Fionnuala Doran, Julian Lawrence, Con Chrisoulis, Nigel Kitching and Tara McInerney.

In 2015, French comics studies scholar Benoît Peeters (a student of Roland Barthes) was appointed as the UK's first ever comics professor at the University of Lancaster. The University began offering a PhD degree in comics studies that same year.

== Learned societies ==
In addition to its presence in academic institutions, comics have also been studied in interdisciplinary learned society. The first US association dedicated to supporting the study of graphic narrative and sequential art was the Comics Studies Society (CSS), launched in 2014 at ICAF. Other anglophone societies that can be mentioned are British Consortium of Comics Scholars (BCCS, created in 2012 by Paul Davies), Scottish Centre for Comics Studies (SCCS) and Canadian Society for the Study of Comics (CSSC, created in October 2010 by Sylvain Rheault).

=== Learned societies in Americas ===
==== Canadian Society for the Study of Comics ====
The first learned society about comics in American continent was the Canadian Society for the Study of Comics (CSSC), also known as Société Canadienne pour l'Étude de la Bande Dessinée (SCEBD). It is a bilingual community of academics focused in discuss all aspects of comics as an art form and cultural phenomenon founded in October 2010 by University of Regina professor Sylvain Rheault.

==== Associação de Pesquisadores em Arte Sequencial ====
Associação de Pesquisadores em Arte Sequencial (ASPAS, Association of Researchers in Sequential Art in Portuguese) was founded in Brazil on March 31, 2012 during the 1st National Forum of Researchers in Sequential Art (FNPAS), an event promoted in the city of Leopoldina, Minas Gerais.

In addition to regular events, ASPAS also promotes various academic activities, such as the Meeting of Comic Artists with Trina Robbins, held in 2015 at Gibiteca Henfil, in São Paulo, and in 2017 at Federal University of Rio de Janeiro.

==== Comics Studies Society ====

In November 2014, during the International Comic Arts Forum (ICAF), the California State University, Northridge professor Charles Hatfield made a motion to create the Comics Studies Society as an interdisciplinary association open to academics, non-academics or independent scholars, teachers, and students who had the goal of promoting the critical study of comics.

At a meeting inside the Billy Ireland Cartoon Library & Museum, the CSS's first Executive Committee was officially voted and the CSS main focuses were defined as "promoting the critical study of comics, improving comics teaching, and engaging in open and ongoing conversations about the comics world". CSS also organizes the Annual Conference of the Comics Studies Society since 2018.

== Scholarly publications ==

Some notable academic journals specifically dedicated to comics studies are listed below in alphabetical order:

- CuCo, Cuadernos de cómic (published by the Editorial de Universidad de Alcalá)
- European Comic Art
- ImageTexT (a peer reviewed, open-access journal that began in the spring of 2004 and is based at the University of Florida)
- Image and Narrative (stylized as Image [&] Narrative, a peer-reviewed e-journal on visual narratology)
- Inks: The Journal of the Comics Studies Society (published by the Ohio State University Press and organized by Comics Studies Society since 2017). The journal was nominated as Eisner Awards Best Comics-Related Periodical/Journalism in 2020.
- International Journal of Comic Art
- 9a Arte Online at https://www.revistas.usp.br/nonaarte/
- Journal of Graphic Novels and Comics
- Revista Latinoamericana de Estudios sobre la Historieta
- Studies in Comics
- SANE: Sequential Art Narrative in Education (based at the University of Nebraska–Lincoln)
- The Comics Grid: Journal of Comics Scholarship (first published in January 2011; an open-access, researcher-led, peer-reviewed academic journal published by the Open Library of Humanities)

== Conferences ==
Although presentations dedicated to comics are commonplace at conferences in many fields, entire conferences dedicated to this subject are becoming more common. There have been conferences at SAIC (International Comic Arts Forum, 2009), MMU (The International Bande Dessinée Society Conference), UTS (Sequential Art Studies Conference), Georgetown, Ohio State (Festival of Cartoon Art), and Bowling Green (Comics in Popular Culture conference), and there is a yearly conference at University of Florida (Conference on Comics and Graphic Novels). Additionally, there is an annual Michigan State University Comics Forum, which brings together academics and professionals working in the industry. Notable regularly held movable conferences include the Comic Art and Comics Area of the Popular Culture Association of America and the conference of the International Society for Humor Studies.

The International Comic Arts Forum (ICAF), begun in 1995 at Georgetown University, has been described as one of the earliest academic initiatives for the study of comics. The German Gesellschaft für Comicforschung (ComFor, Society for Comics Studies) has organized yearly academic conferences since 2006. The Comics Arts Conference has met regularly since 1992 in conjunction with San Diego Comic-Con and WonderCon. Another important conference is the annual International Graphic Novels and Comics Conference held since 2010 organized by British academics. This conference has been held in conjunction with the longer running International Bande Dessinée Society conference. Comics Forum, a UK-based community of international comics scholars, also holds an annual conference at Leeds Central Library; the first was held in 2009.

== Comics studies awards ==
=== Comics Studies Society Prizes ===
Since 2018, Comics Studies Society awards comics studies, books and articles with five annual prizes: the CSS Article Prize, the Hillary Chute Award for Best Graduate Student Paper, the Gilbert Seldes Prize for Public Scholarship, the Charles Hatfield Book Prize, and the CSS Prize for Edited Book Collections. The nominated scholars do not need to be CSS members, but only members can send the nomination letters. All first-time publications during the previous calendar year are eligible (in case of translated books, is considered the year of English publication).

==== Winners ====
===== Charles Hatfield Book Prize =====
- 2018 – Brannon Costello, by Neon Visions: The Comics of Howard Chaykin (Louisiana State University Press)
- 2019 – Lara Saguisag, by Incorrigibles and Innocents: Constructing Childhood and Citizenship in Progressive Era Comics (Rutgers University Press)
- 2020 – Jorge Santos, by Graphic Memories of the Civil Rights Movement: Reframing History in Comics (University of Texas Press)
- 2021 – Rebecca Wanzo, by The Content of Our Caricature: African American Comic Art and Political Belonging (New York University Press)
  - Honorable Mention: Jean Lee Cole, by How the Other Half Laughs: The Comic Sensibility in American Culture, 1895–1920 (University Press of Mississippi)
- 2022 – Susan E. Kirtley, by Typical Girls: The Rhetoric of Womanhood in Comic Strips (Ohio State University Press)
  - Honorable Mention: Esther De Dauw, by Hot Pants and Spandex Suits: Gender Representation in American Superhero Comic Books (Rutgers University Press)
  - Honorable Mention: Zack Kruse, by Mysterious Travelers: Steve Ditko and the Search for a New Liberal Identity (University Press of Mississippi)

===== CSS Article Prize =====
- 2018 – Benoît Crucifix, by "Cut-up and Redrawn: Charles Burns's Swipe Files", published in Inks: The Journal of the Comics Studies Society
- 2019 – André M. Carrington, by "Desiring Blackness: A Queer Orientation to Marvel's Black Panther, 1998–2016", published in American Literature
- 2020 – Dan Mazur, by "Ibrahim Njoya, a Comics Artist in Colonial-Era Cameroon", published in The Comics Journal
- 2021 – Sydney Phillips Heifler, by "Romance Comics, Dangerous Girls, and the Importance of Fathers", published in Journal of Graphic Novels and Comics
  - Honorable Mention: Maite Urcaregui, by "(Un)documenting Single-Panel Methdologies and Epistemologies in the Non-fictional Cartoons of Eric J. García and Alberto Ledesma", published in Prose Studies: History, Theory, Critics
- 2022 – Vincent Haddad, by "Detroit vs. Everybody (Including Superheroes): Representing Race through Setting in DC Comics", published in Inks
  - Honorable Mention: Daniel Stein, by "Black Bodies Swinging: Superheroes and the Shadow Archive of Lynching" published in Closure
  - Honorable Mention: Justin Wigard, by "'The Fearless Spaceman Spiff, Interplanetary Explorer Extraordinaire': Parodic Imagination & the Pulp Aesthetic in Bill Watterson's Calvin & Hobbes", published in Inks

===== CSS Prize for Edited Book Collections =====
- 2020 – Tahneer Oksman and Seamus O'Malley, by The Comics of Julie Doucet and Gabrielle Bell (University of Mississippi Press)
- 2021 – Anna F. Peppard, by Supersex: Sexuality, Fantasy, and the Superhero (University of Texas Press)
  - Honorable Mention: Frederick Luis Aldama, by Graphic Indigeneity: Comics in the Americas and Australasia (University Press of Mississippi)
  - Honorable Mention: Dominic Davies and Candida Rifkind, by Documenting Trauma in Comics: Traumatic Pasts, Embodied Histories, and Graphic Reportage (Palgrave Macmillan)
  - Honorable Mention: Martha Kuhlman and José Alaniz, by Comics of the New Europe: Reflections and Intersections (Leuven University Press)
- 2022 – Benjamin Woo and Jeremy Stoll, by The Comics World: Comic Books, Graphic Novels, and Their Publics (University Press of Mississippi)
  - Honorable Mention: Jamie Brassett and Richard Reynolds, by Superheroes and Excess: A Philosophical Adventure (Routledge)

===== Hillary Chute Award for Best Graduate Student Paper =====
- 2018 – Alex Smith, by "Breaking Panels: Gay Cartoonists' Radical Revolt"
- 2019 – Isabelle Martin, by "'The Weight of Their Past': Reconstructing Memory and History through Reproduced Photographs in Thi Bui's Graphic Novel The Best We Could Do"
- 2020 – Haniyeh Barahouie, by "Mapping the War in Zeina Abirached's A Game for Swallows: To Die, To Leave, To Return"
- 2021 – Maite Urcaregui, by "Political Geographies of Race in James Baldwin and Yoran Cazac's Little Man, Little Man"
  - Honorable Mention: Clémence Sfadj, by "Windows on Everyday Harlem: 'The Cartoons of Ollie Harrington'"
- 2022 – Kay Sohini, by "The Peculiarity of Time"
  - Honorable Mention: Bryan Bove, by "It Can't All Be Sorrow: Confronting Trauma Through Television in Marvel's WandaVision"
  - Honorable Mention: Adrienne Resha, by "Good Is Not a Thing You Are, It's a Thing Superheroes Do: Kamala Khan and the Identity Pause in Ms. Marvel, Superhero Bildungsroman"

===== Gilbert Seldes Prize for Public Scholarship =====
- 2019 – Osvaldo Oyola, by "Guess Who's Coming Home for the Holidays: Intergenerational Conflict in Bitch Planet", The Middle Spaces, "'I AM (not) FROM BEYOND!': Situating Scholarship & the Writing 'I'", The Middle Spaces, and "YA = Young Avengers: Asserting Maturity on the Threshold of Adulthood", The Middle Spaces
- 2020 – Zoe D. Smith, by "4 Colorism, or, the Ashiness of it All" and "4 Colorism, or, White Paper/Brown Pixels", Women Wrote About Comics
- 2021 – Zachary J.A. Rondinelli, by "#WelcomeToSlumberland Social Media Research Project"
  - Honorable Mention: Anna F. Peppard, by "(Behold?) The Vision's Penis: The Presence of Absence in Mutant Romance Tales"
- 2022 – Ritesh Badu, by "Civilized Monsters: These Savage Shores and the Colonialist Cage"
  - Honorable Mention: Vincent Haddad, by "'That Wingnut is Insane': Reality vs. Fictionality in Conspiracy Comics"
  - Honorable Mention: The Oh Gosh, Oh Golly, Oh Wow! Podcast with Anna Peppard, Christopher Maverick, J. Andrew Deman, and Shawn Gilmore, episode 5, "Excalibur #5: 'Send in the Clowns'"

== See also ==
- Alternative comics
- Childhood studies
- Glossary of comics terminology
- Graphic medicine
- Comics in education
- Comics poetry
- Conference on College Composition and Communication
- "How to Read Nancy"
- Joe Kubert School of Cartoon and Graphic Art
- List of comics critics
- University Press of Mississippi: Great Comics Artists Series / Comics and Popular Culture category
- Wilhelm Busch Museum

People

- Donald Ault
- Martin Barker
- Bart Beaty
- Julian Chambliss
- Peter Coogan
- Mark Evanier
- Mel Gibson
- Ian Gordon
- Thierry Groensteen
- Charles Hatfield
- Jeet Heer
- M. Thomas Inge
- James Kakalios
- Susan Kirtley
- MJ Hibbett
- Joan Ormrod
- Shirrel Rhoades
- Candida Rifkind
- Julia Round
- Peter Sanderson
- Jim Steranko
- Carol Tilley
- Michael Uslan
- Rebecca Wanzo
- Qiana Whitted
- Kent Worcester
