= Eisner Award for Best Academic/Scholarly Work =

American comic book award

- Awarded for: Best Academic/Scholarly Work on Comic Books
- Country: United States
- First award: 2012
- Most recent winner: Manga’s First Century: How Creators and Fans Made Japanese Comics, 1905–1989, by Andrea Horbinski
- Website: www.comic-con.org/awards/eisner-awards-current-info

The Eisner Award for Best Academic/Scholarly Work is the Eisner Award for "creative achievement" in American comic books for academic publishing. Before the creation of the award academic works could be nominated for Best Comics-related Book.

== Name changes ==
From 2012 to 2013 the award was named Best Educational/Academic Work. From 2014 to 2015 the award was named Best Scholarly/Academic Work. The award took on its current name in 2016.

== Winners and nominees ==
Award winners and nominees
Year	Author	Title	Publisher	Result	Ref.
2012	Ivan Brunetti	Cartooning: Philosophy & Practice	Yale University Press	Winner	
2012	Charles Hatfield	Hand of Fire: The Comics Art of Jack Kirby	University Press of Mississippi	Winner	
2012	Eric Berlatsky (ed.)	Alan Moore: Conversations	University Press of Mississippi	Nominee	
2012	Jared Gardner	Projections: Comics and the History of 21st Century Storytelling	Stanford University Press	Nominee	
2012	Matthew J. Smith and Randy Duncan (eds.)	Critical Approaches to Comics: Theories and Methods	Routledge	Nominee	
2013	Susan E. Kirtley	Lynda Barry: Girlhood Through the Looking Glass	University Press of Mississippi	Winner	
2013	Bart Beaty	Comics Versus Art	University of Toronto Press	Nominee	
2013	Scott Bukatman	The Poetics of Slumberland	University of California Press	Nominee	
2013	Elisabeth El Refaie	Autobiographical Comics: Life Writing in Pictures	University Press of Mississippi	Nominee	
2013	Philip Nel	Crockett Johnson & Ruth Krauss: How an Unlikely Couple Found Love, Dodged the FBI, and Transformed Children’s Literature	University Press of Mississippi	Nominee	
2014	Sheena C. Howard and Ronald L. Jackson II (eds.)	Black Comics: Politics of Race and Representation	Bloomsbury Publishing	Winner	
2014	Charles Hatfield, Jeet Heer, and Kent Worcester (eds.)	The Superhero Reader	University Press of Mississippi	Nominee	
2014	John A. Lent (ed.)	International Journal of Comic Art		Nominee	
2014	Nathan Vernon Madison	Anti-Foreign Imagery in American Pulps and Comic Books, 1920–1960	McFarland & Company	Nominee	
2014	Jane Tolmie (ed.)	Drawing from Life: Memory and Subjectivity in Comic Art	University Press of Mississippi	Nominee	
2015	Sarah Lightman (ed.)	Graphic Details: Jewish Women’s Confessional Comics in Essays and Interviews	McFarland & Company	Winner	
2015	Michael Barrier	Funnybooks: The Improbable Glories of the Best American Comic Books	University of California Press	Nominee	
2015	Andrew Hoberek	Considering Watchmen: Poetics, Property, Politics	Rutgers University Press	Nominee	
2015	A. David Lewis	American Comics, Literary Theory, and Religion: The Superhero Afterlife	Palgrave Macmillan	Nominee	
2015	Katherine Roeder	Wide Awake in Slumberland: Fantasy, Mass Culture, and Modernism in the Art of Winsor McCay	University Press of Mississippi	Nominee	
2015	Thierry Smolderen	The Origins of Comics: From William Hogarth to Winsor McCay	University Press of Mississippi	Nominee	
2016	Frances Gateward and John Jennings (eds.)	The Blacker the Ink: Constructions of Black Identity in Comics and Sequential Art	Rutgers University Press	Winner	
2016	M. K. Czerwiec, Ian Williams, Susan Merrill Squier, Michael J. Green, Kimberly R. Myers, and Scott T. Smith	Graphic Medicine Manifesto	Penn State University Press	Nominee	
2016	Rayna Denison and Rachel Mizsei-Ward (eds.)	Superheroes on World Screens	University Press of Mississippi	Nominee	
2016	Mark McLelland, Kazumi Nagaike, Katsuhiko Suganuma, and James Welker (eds.)	Boys Love Manga and Beyond: History, Culture, and Community in Japan	University Press of Mississippi	Nominee	
2016	Nick Sousanis	Unflattening	Harvard University Press	Nominee	
2017	Carolyn Cocoa	Superwomen: Gender, Power, and Representation	Bloomsbury Publishing	Winner	
2017	Tim Jackson	Pioneering Cartoonists of Color	University Press of Mississippi	Nominee	
2017	Daniel Marrone	Forging the Past: Set and the Art of Memory	University Press of Mississippi	Nominee	
2017	Marc Sobel	Brighter Than You Think: Ten Short Works by Alan Moore	Uncivilized Books	Nominee	
2017	Paul Young	Frank Miller's Daredevil and the Ends of Heroism	Rutgers University Press	Nominee	
2018	Frederick Luis Aldama	Latinx Superheroes in Mainstream Comics	University of Arizona Press	Winner	
2018	Brannon Costello	Neon Visions: The Comics of Howard Chaykin	LSU Press	Nominee	
2018	Jared Gardner and Ian Gordon (eds.)	The Comics of Charles Schulz: The Good Grief of Modern Life	University Press of Mississippi	Nominee	
2018	Mark Heimermann and Brittany Tullis (eds.)	Picturing Childhood: Youth in Transnational Comics	University of Texas Press	Nominee	
2018	Kate Polak	Ethics in the Gutter: Empathy and Historical Fiction in Comics	Ohio State University Press	Nominee	
2019	Anne Elizabeth Moore	Sweet Little Cunt: The Graphic Work of Julie Doucet	Uncivilized Books	Winner	
2019	Eddie Campbell	The Goat-Getters: Jack Johnson, the Fight of the Century, and How a Bunch of Raucous Cartoonists Reinvented Comics	Library of American Comics/IDW Publishing/Ohio State University Press	Nominee	
2019	Aaron Kashtan	Between Pen and Pixel: Comics, Materiality, and the Book of the Future	Ohio State University Press	Nominee	
2019	Lara Saguisag	Incorrigibles and Innocents, Constructing Childhood and Citizenship in Progressive Era Comics	Rutgers University Press	Nominee	
2019	Marc Singer	Breaking the Frames: Populism and Prestige in Comics Studies	University of Texas Press	Nominee	
2020	Qiana Whitted	EC Comics: Race, Shock, and Social Protest	Rutgers University Press	Winner	
2020	Andrew Blauner (ed.)	The Peanuts Papers: Writers and Cartoonists on Charlie Brown, Snoopy & the Gang, and the Meaning of Life	Library of America	Nominee	
2020	Benjamin Fraser	The Art of Pere Joan: Space, Landscape, and Comics Form	University of Texas Press	Nominee	
2020	Kevin Haworth	The Comics of Rutu Modan: War, Love, and Secrets	University Press of Mississippi	Nominee	
2020	Christina Meyer	Producing Mass Entertainment: The Serial Life of the Yellow Kid	Ohio State University Press	Nominee	
2020	Fusami Ogi, Rebecca Suter, Kazumi Nagaike, and John A. Lent (eds.)	Women's Manga in Asia and Beyond: Uniting Different Cultures and Identities	Palgrave Macmillan	Nominee	
2021	Rebecca Wanzo	The Content of Our Caricature: African American Comic Art and Political Belonging	New York University Press	Winner	
2021	Neil Cohn	Who Understands Comics: Questioning the Universality of Visual Language Comprehension	Bloomsbury Publishing	Nominee	
2021	Charles Hatfield and Bart Beaty (eds.)	Comic Studies: A Guidebook	Rutgers University Press	Nominee	
2021	Sean Kleefeld	Webcomics	Bloomsbury Publishing	Nominee	
2021	Kim A. Munson (ed.)	Comic Art in Museums	University Press of Mississippi	Nominee	
2022	Eike Exner	Comics and the Origins of Manga: A Revisionist History	Rutgers University Press	Winner	
2022	Andrew J. Kunka	The Life and Comics of Howard Cruse: Taking Risks in the Service of Truth	Rutgers University Press	Nominee	
2022	Zack Kruse	Mysterious Travelers: Steve Ditko and the Search for a New Liberal Identity	University Press of Mississippi	Nominee	
2022	Paul S. Hirsch	Pulp Empire: The Secret History of Comics Imperialism	University of Chicago Press	Nominee	
2022	David Kunzle	Rebirth of the English Comic Strip: A Kaleidoscope, 1847–1870	University Press of Mississippi	Nominee	
2023	Josef Benson and Doug Singsen	Bandits, Misfits, and Superheroes: Whiteness and Its Borderlands in American Comics and Graphic Novels	University Press of Mississippi	Nominee	
2023	Erin La Cour and Anna Poletti (eds.)	Graphic Medicine	University of Hawaiʻi Press	Nominee	
2023	Katherine Kelp-Stebbins	How Comics Travel: Publication, Translation, Radical Literacies	Ohio State University Press	Nominee	
2023	Alison Halsall and Jonathan Warren (eds.)	The LGBTQ+ Comics Studies Reader: Critical Openings, Future Directions	University Press of Mississippi	Winner	
2023	Tim Smyth	Teaching with Comics and Graphic Novels	Routledge	Nominee	
2024	John A. Lent	Asian Political Cartoons	University Press of Mississippi	Nominee	
2024	Jeffrey A. Brown	Super Bodies: Comic Book Illustration, Artistic Styles, and Narrative Impact	University of Texas Press	Nominee	
2024	J. Andrew Deman	The Claremont Run: Subverting Gender in the X- Men	University of Texas Press	Winner	
2024	edited by Qiana Whitted	Desegregating Comics: Debating Blackness in the Golden Age of American Comics	Rutgers University Press	Nominee	
2024	George Khoury-Jad	If Shehrazad Drew: Critical Writings on Arab Comics	Sawaf Center for Arab Comics Studies and American University of Beirut Press	Nominee	
2024	Margaret Galvan	In Visible Archives: Queer and Feminist Visual Culture in the 1980s	University of Minnesota Press	Nominee	
2025	Margaret C. Flinn	Drawing (in) the Feminine: Bande Dessinée and Women	Ohio State University Press	Winner	
2025	Jonathan Najarian	Comics and Modernism: History, Form, and Culture	University Press of Mississippi	Nominee	
2025	Neale Barnholden	From Gum Wrappers to Richie Rich: The Materiality of Cheap Comics	University Press of Mississippi	Nominee	
2025	Daniel Worden	Petrochemical Fantasies: The Art and Energy of American Comics	Ohio State University Press	Nominee	
2025	Michelle Ann Abate	Singular Sensations: A Cultural History of One-Panel Comics in the United States	Rutgers University Press	Nominee	
2026	Andrea Horbinski	Manga's First Century: How Creators and Fans Made Japanese Comics, 1905-1989	University of California Press	Winner	
2026	John A. Lent	Comic Art in Korea	University Press of Mississippi	Nominee	
2026	José Alaniz	Comics of the Anthropocene: Graphic Narrative at the End of Nature	University Press of Mississippi	Nominee	
2026	Jennifer Boum Make, Charly Verstraet	Graphic Narratives of Resistance	Edinburgh University Press	Nominee	
2026	Fernanda Díaz-Basteris, Maite Urcaregui	Latinx Comic Studies: Critical and Creative Crossings	Rutgers University Press	Nominee	

== See also ==
- List of Eisner Award winners
