= Wanzo =

Wanzo is a surname. Notable people with the surname include:

- Rebecca Wanzo (born 1975), American academic
- Mel Wanzo (1930–2005), American trombonist
