= Ann Miller (comics scholar) =

Ann Miller (born 1949) is an English academic and translator. An expert on French comics, she has translated many works of comics theory, including that of Benoit Peeters and Thierry Groensteen.

== Life ==
Miller taught French and Spanish in comprehensive schools in London in the 1970s, before moving to Oxford to work in teacher education. In the late 1990s she took up an academic post at the School of Modern Languages at the University of Leicester, collaborating on new ways to teach French language. She was Head of French and Senior Lecturer at Leicester, teaching cultural studies, textual analysis, French cinema and bande dessinée (i.e. French-language comics). She was a founding editor of the journal European Comic Art.

In 2010 Miller retired from full-time teaching.

== Works ==
- Reading bande dessinée: critical approaches to French-language comic strip. Bristol: Intellect Books, 2007.
- (ed. with Natalie Edwards and Amy L. Hubbell) Textual & visual selves: photography, film, and comic art in French autobiography. Lincoln, Nebraska: University of Nebraska Press, 2011.
- (tr.) Comics and narration by Thierry Groensteen. Jackson: University of Mississippi Press, 2013.
- (ed. with Bart Beaty) The French comics theory reader. Leuven: Leuven University Press, 2014.
- (tr.) The expanding art of comics: ten modern masterpieces by Thierry Groensteen. Jackson: University of Mississippi Press, 2017.
