= Thierry Groensteen =

Comics theorist, publisher and curator

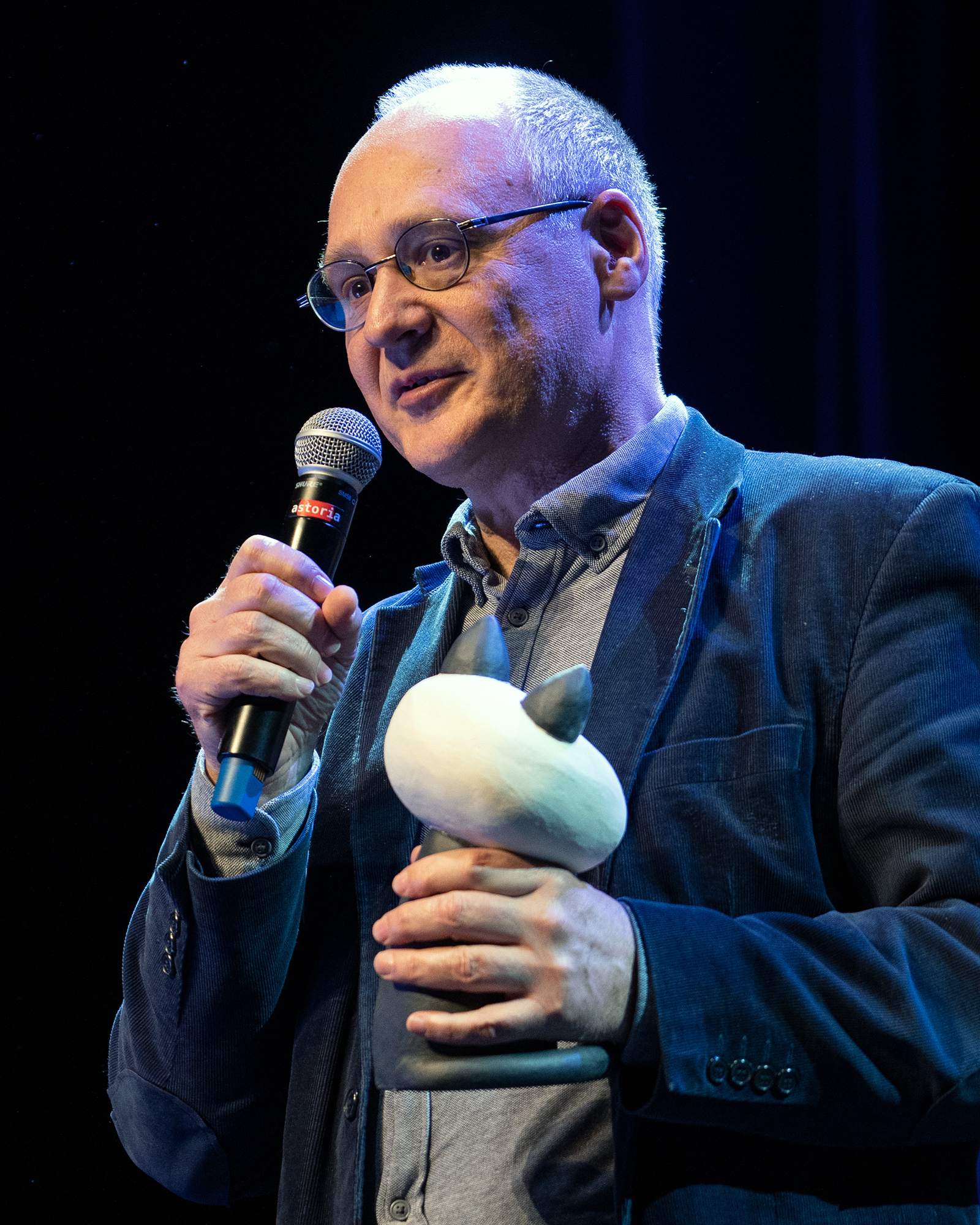
Groensteen in 2023

Thierry Groensteen (French: [ɡʁɔnstɛn]; born 18 April 1957) is a Belgian comics researcher and theorist.

== Career ==
In 1984, Groensteen became the editor-in-chief of the old fanzine Schtroumpf : Les Cahiers de la bande dessinée, transforming it into one of the first publications that would lead to serious academic criticism of comics in France and beyond. He integrated the publishing company into discussions on art and culture. His work as the organizer of the famous Colloque de Cérisy, in 1987, titled "Bande dessinée, récit et modernité" ("Comics, narrative and modernity"), was also an important contribution.

As the director of Angoulême's Musée de la bande dessinée, during the early 1990s, he worked on many projects such as exhibitions and their catalogues as well as on monographs on several authors, or themes and collections presented by the Angoulême Museum. He was also the director of the first run of its official magazine, Neuvième Art.

He was the founder and editor at Éditions de L'An 2, before this publishing house was integrated by Actes Sud. He is a lecturer at the École européenne supérieure des Arts et technologies de l'image. He is also a key member of Oubapo association.

== Bibliography ==
=== Books ===
Thierry Groensteen has published countless articles and many books, all of which have been important or even broaching of some themes. He has penned, among other titles:

- Töpffer, l'invention de la bande dessinée ["Töpffer. The Invention of Comics"]. Paris: Hermann. 1994. ISBN 2-7056-6214-6., co-written with Benoît Peeters.
- Systéme de la bande dessinée, ["System of Comics", issued in English in 2007 by the University Press of Mississippi]. Paris: Presses universitaires de France. 1999. ISBN 2-13-050183-4.
- Lignes de vie. Le visage dessiné ["Lines of Life: The Drawn Face"]. Saint-Egrève: Mosquito. 2003. ISBN 2-908551-52-7.
- Un objet culturel non identifié ["An unidentified cultural object"]. [Angoulême]: Éd. de l'An 2. 2006. ISBN 2-84856-078-9.
- La Bande dessinée mode d'emploi ["Comics: A User's Manual"]. [Bruxelles]: les Impressions nouvelles. 2007. ISBN 978-2-87449-041-5.
- La bande dessinée: son histoire et ses maîtres. Paris: Skira-Flammarion. 2009. ISBN 978-2-08-122757-6.
- Bande dessinée et narration (Système de la bande dessinée, 2). Paris: PUF. 2011. ISBN 978-2-13-058487-2.. Translated by Ann Miller as Comics and narration, Jackson: University of Mississippi Press, 2013.

=== Articles in English ===
- "The Schulz System. Why Peanuts work". Nemo: The Classic Comics Library. 31/32: 26–41. 1992.
- "The evolution of the cultural status of the comic strip: an Art-Form in search of Recognition". Popular Culture and Mass Communication in Twentieth-Century France. Lewinston: Edwin Mellen. 1992. pp. 207–219.
- "Fully-painted artwork: seduction by images". Couleur directe. Thurn: Kunst der Comics. 1993. pp. 10–75.
- Mellor, David Alan, ed. (1997). "Comic Strip and Newspaper Cartoons: The Dawn of a Revolution". The Sixties. London: Philip Wilson. pp. 132–148.
- "Töpffer: the originator of the modern comic strip". Forging a new medium. The Comic Strip in the Nineteenth Century. Bruxelles: VUBPress. 1998. pp. 105–114.
- "Gustave Doré's comics". International Journal of Comic Art. 2 (2): 111–120. Fall 2000.
- "A matter of lines". Ever Meulen, Verve. Angoulême: Éd. de l'An 2. 2006. pp. 17–26.
- "A Few Words about The System of Comics and More…". European Comic Art. 1 (1): 87–93. Spring 2008.
- Heer, Jeet; Worcester, Kent, eds. (2008). "Why Are Comics Still in Search of Cultural Legitimization". A Comics Studies Reader. Jackson: University Press of Mississippi. pp. 3–11.
- Heer, Jeet; Worcester, Kent, eds. (2008). "The Impossible Definition". A Comics Studies Reader. Jackson: University Press of Mississippi. pp. 124–131.
- Groensteen, Thierry (Spring 2010). "The Monstrator, the Recitant, and the Shadow of the Narrator". European Comic Art. 3 (1): 1–21. doi:10.3828/eca.2010.2.
