= Donald Ault =

American academic (1942–2019)

- Born: October 5, 1942; Canton, Ohio, U.S.
- Died: April 13, 2019 (aged 76); Gainesville, Florida, U.S.

Academic background
- Education: University of Chicago

Academic work
- Discipline: Literary studies, comics studies
- Institutions: University of Florida

Donald D. Ault (/ɔːlt/ AWLT; October 5, 1942 – April 13, 2019) was an American academic who was a professor at the University of Florida and is primarily known for his work on British Romantic poet William Blake, British physicist Sir Isaac Newton and American comics artist Carl Barks. He is also known as a foundational figure in the development of American comics studies, and was the General Editor of the academic journal devoted to comics called ImageTexT.

== Career ==
Donald Ault graduated from the University of Chicago in 1968, after completing work on his dissertation tracing the conflict between British physicist Sir Isaac Newton and William Blake. Since then, he has taught at University of California, Berkeley, Vanderbilt University, and the University of Florida.

== Working with William Blake ==
Ault's interests are wide and include everything from Romantic poetry to psychophysics, holography, psychoanalysis, deconstruction, typography, mathematical notation, and the history of animation. At Berkeley in 1972–74, he instituted curriculum changes by creating English 176 (“Literature and Popular Culture”) and English 177 (“Literature and Philosophy”). Ault's first book Visionary Physics: Blake's Response to Newton, an extended version of his dissertation, dealt with the complex relationship between Blake and Newton. The book won wide acclaim among Blake critics, and quickly became a foundational book in the field. He also published the most exhaustive book on Blake's visionary poem Vala called Narrative Unbound: Re-Visioning William Blake's The Four Zoas. After reading Narrative Unbound, Jerome McGann called Ault "probably the most innovative Blake critic in the country" Ault has published numerous articles on William Blake, including the notable "Where's Poppa? or, The Defeminization of Blake's Little Black Boy." which utilized "anomalous textual details" and turned attention away from the obvious racial issues present in the poem focusing on the more subtle politics of gender difference. He ends the essay with the note that, in a dream, he "showed this manuscript to Blake, who told me that he was 'not uncomfortable' with my reading of 'The Little Black Boy.'" While such comments have alienated some members of the Blake studies community, they are part and parcel of his criticism which highlights the textual minutae, visionary complexity, and visual oddity of Blake's work.

== Donald Ault and Donald Duck ==
Ault also worked closely with Disney comic artist Carl Barks and participated in a number of interviews with him. Ault's forays into "comics studies" revolve around his encounter with Barks' work on Donald Duck. Ault sees Barks creating a surreal environment for the Disney characters in which what happens

happens outside normal visual space. It cannot happen, but it does--and with apparent ease. In film, a technique of rapid crosscutting would quickly disorient the viewer; but Barks' shifts in perspective--precisely because they are anchored in the simultaneity of the panels on a comic page--ground us in a coherent imaginative world.

Ault created controversy at Vanderbilt University for teaching comics in university classes, and was featured in several newspaper articles about his work as well as a segment on Entertainment Tonight. Ault edited a volume of interviews with the Disney artist, Carl Barks: Conversations, in 2003, and also was executive producer and editorial supervisor for the videotape production The Duck Man: An Interview with Carl Barks (1996).

== ImageTexT ==
In 2004, Ault founded the academic journal ImageText. ImageText promotes

the academic study of comic books, comic strips, and animated cartoons. Under the guidance of an editorial board of scholars from a variety of disciplines, ImageTexT publishes solicited and peer-reviewed papers that investigate the material, historical, theoretical, and cultural implications of visual textuality. ImageTexT welcomes essays emphasizing (but not limited to) the aesthetics, cognition, production, reception, distribution and dissemination of comics and other media as they relate to comics, along with translations of previously existing research on comics as dimensions of visual culture.

== Selected bibliography ==
- Visionary Physics: Blake's Response To Newton. Chicago and London: University of Chicago Press, 1974. Reissued as a Midway Paperback, 1975. xvi + 230 pp.
- Narrative Unbound: Re-Visioning Blake's The Four Zoas. Barrytown, NY: Station Hill Press, 1987. xxvi + 518 pp.
- Critical Paths: Blake and the Argument of Method. Ed. Donald Ault, Mark Bracher, and Dan Miller. Durham, NC: Duke University Press, 1987. 382 pp.
- Carl Barks: Conversations. Ed. Donald Ault. University Press of Mississippi, 2003.
