= U.S. Government Informational Comics =

US government comic publishing

Prior to Pearl Harbor and the United States becoming involved in World War II, private comic book publishers and later government comic book publications increased and gained popularity among the foreign and domestic populations and Allied forces. Once the U.S. entered World War II, comic book sales greatly increased. Between 1941 and 1944 comic book sales doubled from 10 million to 20 million copies per month. As the popularity of the comics grew, companies such as DC Comics and Marvel Comics and their predecessor companies started developing comics geared for military audiences. Evidence of the growth and popularity of these comics and their pro-U.S. stance and messaging is noted by Comic Books Go to War;

Between 1940 and 1945, circulation numbers would triple and at military post exchanges, comic books outsold standard fare such as Life and Reader's Digest by as much as ten to one.

These comic books were developed, illustrated and published with the intention of educating and informing U.S. citizens and U.S. military, while also being entertaining and engaging. Many of these comics' goals were and are to educate soldiers on specific duties, broadcast and reflect the life of American soldiers while deployed, back to the homeland and explain U.S. foreign policy for specific actions and conflicts.

== World War II comics ==
During World War II private comic book companies displayed their patriotism and support of the war effort through American superheroes. Paralleling the actions by comic book companies, the U.S. government took independent initiatives to create comics in support of the U.S. military. Comic books became increasing popular during the war for varying reasons and the U.S. military and companies sought to take advantage of it. Soldiers were being deployed to varying theaters of battle and comics accompanied them on their journeys to Europe and Asia, and in some cases millions, of copies a month were printed to keep up with the demand.

=== Joe Palooka ===
The Joe Palooka comic was developed in 1921 by Ham Fisher and was a comic strip about an American heavy weight boxer. The comic strip soon evolved into a full comic book series during World War II where Joe took on the Axis powers. The comic gained popularity and the creators inquired about political figures becoming involved in the comic. Eventually, in two of the comics, President Franklin D. Roosevelt gave permission to the publisher to appear in the comics and pardon Joe from desertion of the foreign legion, "Fisher contacted White House secretaries Stephen Early and Marvin McIntyre to see if President Franklin D. Roosevelt would agree to appear in the strip and extricate Joe and Smokey from their predicament. The White House agreed, and FDR showed up in the Palooka strip on two consecutive days in June 1938 to obtain Joe's release from the Foreign Legion and a full pardon from the French president for the desertion charges."

As the Joe Palooka comics took on the Axis powers, his popularity grew and the comics were featured in over 20 countries. The U.S. government, wanting to capitalize on Joe's popularity, decided to engage Fisher on collaboration, "Undersecretary of War Robert Patterson furnished Fisher with a letter that allowed the cartoonist to tour army training camps and gather information for his strip. Soon, Palooka was reporting to Fort Dix for basic training, and he eventually helped instruct new recruits." The U.S. military increasingly utilized the image of Joe Palooka into their own instruction of soldiers into training manuals, recruitment material, guides on hygiene and instructions on invading countries. As World War II concluded, Joe Palooka educated soldiers how to acclimate to civilian life.

=== United States Marines #3: A leatherneck Flamethrower ===
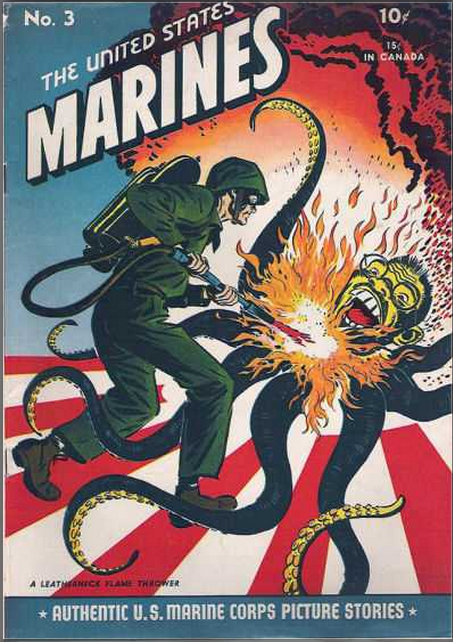
Marine Leather Neck Comic Cover

United States Marines #3: A Leatherneck Flamethrower was a comic published by Government Enterprises. It was authored by Milburn McCarty and drawn by Mart Bailey, Wood Cowan, Ogden Whitney, and Ray McGill. This comic book series was published during World War II and continued for a time afterwards. It illustrated the U.S. Marines Corps' battles in the Pacific and their encounters with the Japanese. The comic also included varying characterizations and illustrations of the Japanese, such as Prime Minister Hideki Tōjō, being depicted as an octopus. The comic book series was done with the approval and collaboration with the United States Marine Corps. The comics published during World War II included images of Marines in the Pacific and their living conditions, battles, meals and lifestyle.

=== The Life of Franklin D. Roosevelt, 32nd President of the United States ===
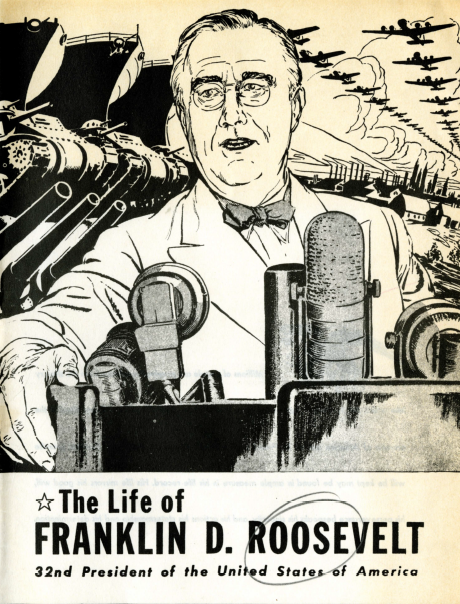
Comic book cover of The Life of Franklin D. Roosevelt

The Office of War Information created and published this comic in 1943. This was a 16 page comic about the childhood of President Franklin D. Roosevelt. The comic illustrated the energy, and vivaciousness of Roosevelt through his youth. Roosevelt was a representation of America and of America's youth and their abilities. Therefore, Roosevelt demonstrated his outdoor and rugged character in handling a rifle and playing football. The ultimate purpose of the comic was to capture and conceptualize the American spirit as an individual who is rugged, tough, an outdoorsman and someone who is persistent. Critics of this cartoon argue that it had little to do with the war effort but was propaganda, created to support President Roosevelt's elections into a 4th term.

=== "Willie and Joe" cartoons ===
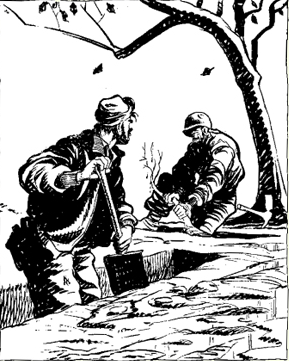
"Me future is settled, Willie. I'm gonna be a perfessor on types o' European soil."

Willie and Joe comics were created by Bill Mauldin during World War II. During World War II, Mauldin was a soldier in the 45th Infantry Division and he worked for the unit's newspaper. During his work for the newspaper, he created infantrymen cartoon characters, Willie and Joe. Joe would evolve to become the GI Joe that represented the average American soldier. As the war progressed, Mauldin's Willie and Joe cartoons increased in notoriety, and as a result, Stars and Stripes newspaper instructed Mauldin with covering the war through cartoons. Mauldin eventually worked for Stars and Stripes, received his own vehicle to traverse the battlefield and gain material for his comics. The United States Department of War approved and backed Mauldin's comics for further publication because of the reality it drew of the war and the accessibility it gave to soldiers and citizens of the difficulty of the American military during World War II.

Beyond informing and entertaining its readers, the comic gave the average soldier an outlet for frustration and hardship during their deployment. Mauldin's Willie and Joe cartoons were read through the various theaters of war in WWII and domestically back in the United States. After World War II, Mauldin had trouble assimilating Willie and Joe into civilian life.

=== Under-cover War ===
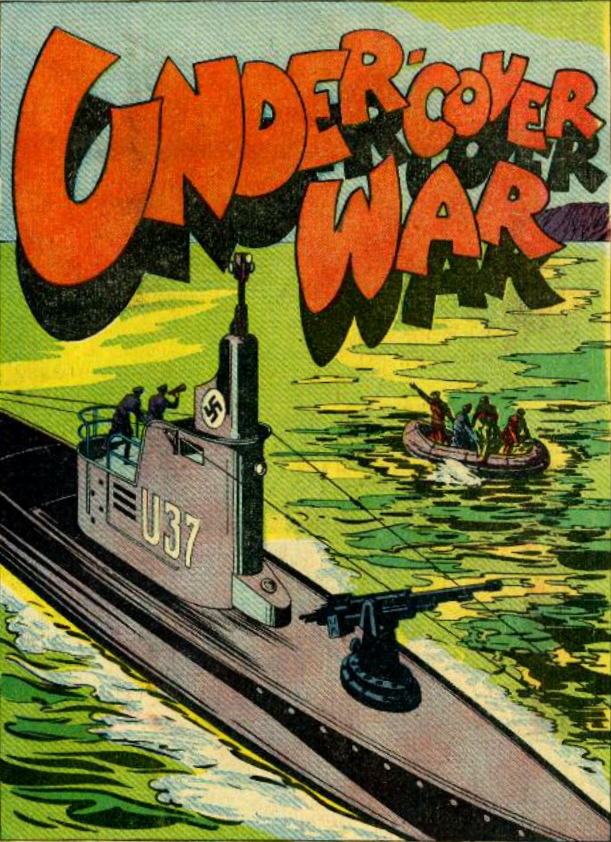
Under-cover War Cover

Under-cover War was a comic developed during World War II by the U.S. Petroleum Administration for War, in 1943. The comic was developed and published to reinvigorate U.S. industrial workers, especially in the petroleum industry. The reasoning for this was after the first year of World War II, many workers lost their morale and vigor and needed a new source of energy and motivation. PAW stated the purpose was "to inspire refinery construction workers with the huge importance of their work." The comic depicts the war within the Western Front and the subversive planning of the Nazis and how they were preparing to outlast the U.S. war effort. The comic's messaging gives special attention to enemy plans of covert action and sabotage against U.S. industries and refineries. Through the vigilance of the enemy, the comic focuses the reader on the necessity of the U.S. to continue its war effort in defeating the Nazis and the importance of petroleum and its critical role in fueling the U.S. war effort, especially U.S. air raids and naval forces.

=== Yank, the Army Weekly ===
Yank was a comic series that was published in the Army Weekly and it started publication on June 6, 1942. The Office of Morale Services created Yank and the staff consisted of previous Stars and Stripes employees. One of the most popular sections was Sad Sack, created by Sergeant George Baker. Sad Sack dealt with the problems that enlisted men might go through, such as kitchen patrol duty, newly commissioned inexperienced officers, and other common and daily interactions by the enlisted servicemen. Within Yank, there were sections for feedback and comments to allow deployed soldiers to vent their frustrations and convey their struggles in being deployed.

== Korean War comics ==
=== Bullets or Words ===
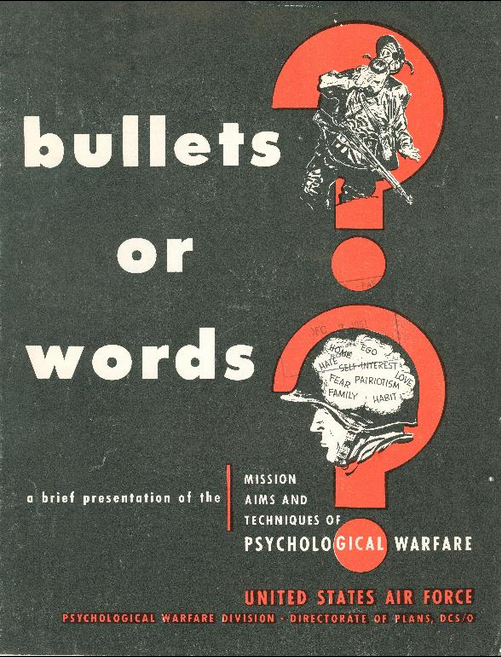
Cover page to Bullets or Words Comic

Bullets or Words was a short, five-page comic, illustrated during the Korean War. The U.S. Air Force Psychological Warfare Division created the comic, but the United States Printing Office published it in 1951. The artists responsible for illustrating Bullets or Words were Arthur Milton Caniff and Herbert Block. The comic educates the reader on the necessity of psychological warfare upon the enemy and highlights its implementation and execution during World War II, especially in support of the actions by Allied forces. Bullets or Words then draws the conclusion that psychological warfare is necessary in the Korean War. The comic identifies varying methods of conveying information, such as word of mouth, radio transmissions and leaflet dropping over the enemy territory. Within the first year of the Korean War over 600,000 leaflets were dropped into enemy territory and the effectiveness is measured by the United Nations account that 1/3 of Korean forces surrendered because of psychological warfare. The comic concludes with an offer to civilians to join the U.S. Air Force in SYKE-AIR missions to reduce the enemy.

=== What Am I Doing Here? ===
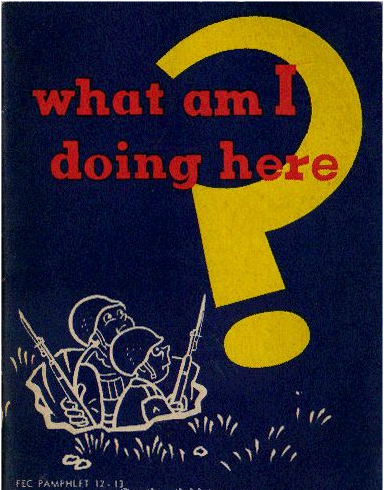
Comic explaining the reason for U.S. intervention in Korea

What Am I Doing Here? was an instructional comic targeted for enlisted U.S. military. It was published in 1950. The purpose for "What Am I Doing Here?" comic is to simplify the reasoning behind the U.S. military efforts in Korea and thereby make it accessible and understandable to the enlisted soldiers. It explained the United States' foreign policy of containment and hence supported the intervention in Korea, while simultaneously boosting the morale of the soldiers. The comic also necessitated the U.S. measures on ceasing the Soviet Union from gaining resources in Korea in their endeavor to spread and propagate communism and encircle the United States.

=== Mines & Booby Traps ===
Mines & Booby Traps was a comic developed for the U.S. military while deployed in Korea. This was developed in 1951 and it sought to educate the U.S. soldier as to the common traps and explosives used by the North Koreans. The purpose is to create awareness and reduce casualties.

=== Soldier Comics ===
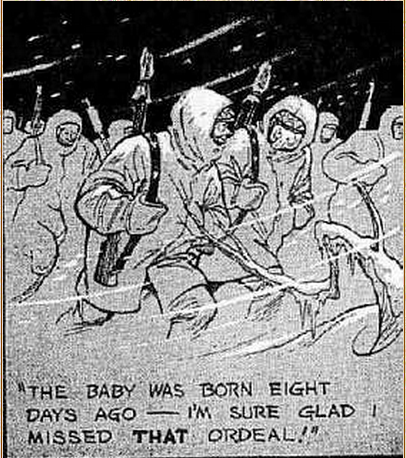
A page from the comic Leather Head in Korea

Soldier Comics were published by Fawcett Publications during the Korean War and stopped in 1953. They covered varying topics and issues during the war, and were targeted for domestic and military personnel. The comics followed fictional characters, such as Sergeant Harms, Lieutenant Starke, Corporal Tigrett, Private First Class Adams and Kim, a South Korean guerilla. As the comics follow these characters, they each teach specific lessons and give insight into the lives of the U.S. military, reasoning for the Korean War and the evil of communism. Some of the topics covered by the comics are the occupation of Pyongyang, The Weakest Link, Night Mission, Choon Gum Joins Up. Through these topics and others, the readers and soldiers learn:

- How to properly evacuate a position and what is of value to the enemy and therefore worth destroying,
- The lesson of strength through teamwork and the key to success in defeating the enemy in Korea is solidarity and brotherhood
- The interactions of a U.S. soldier with Korean civilians and how they can be helpful during the war in knowing the local terrain.

=== Leather Head in Korea ===
Leather Head in Korea comic was written and drawn by Norval R. Packwood and published by the Marine Corps Gazette. It focused on the U.S. Marine Corps in Korea and the issues and difficulties the Marines were encountering in their time deployed. The comic's inception and situations were influenced through the time of Packwood's service in Korea.

== Vietnam War comics ==
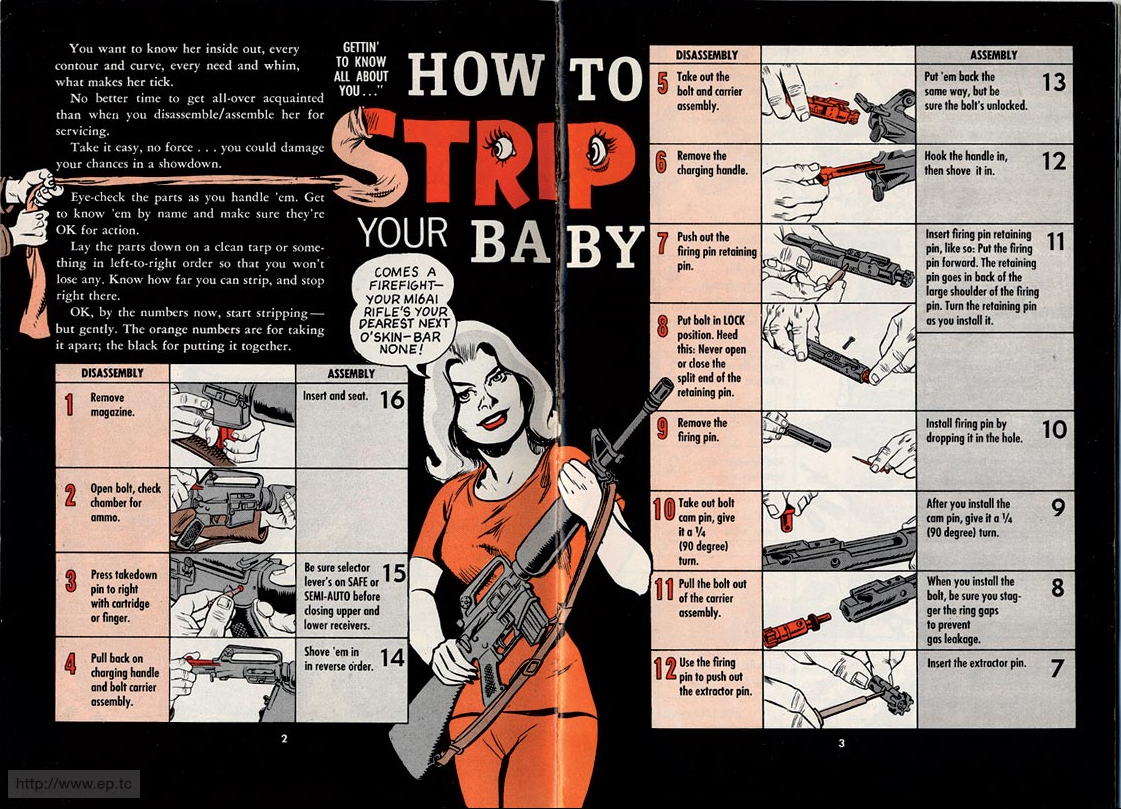
How to Strip Your Baby

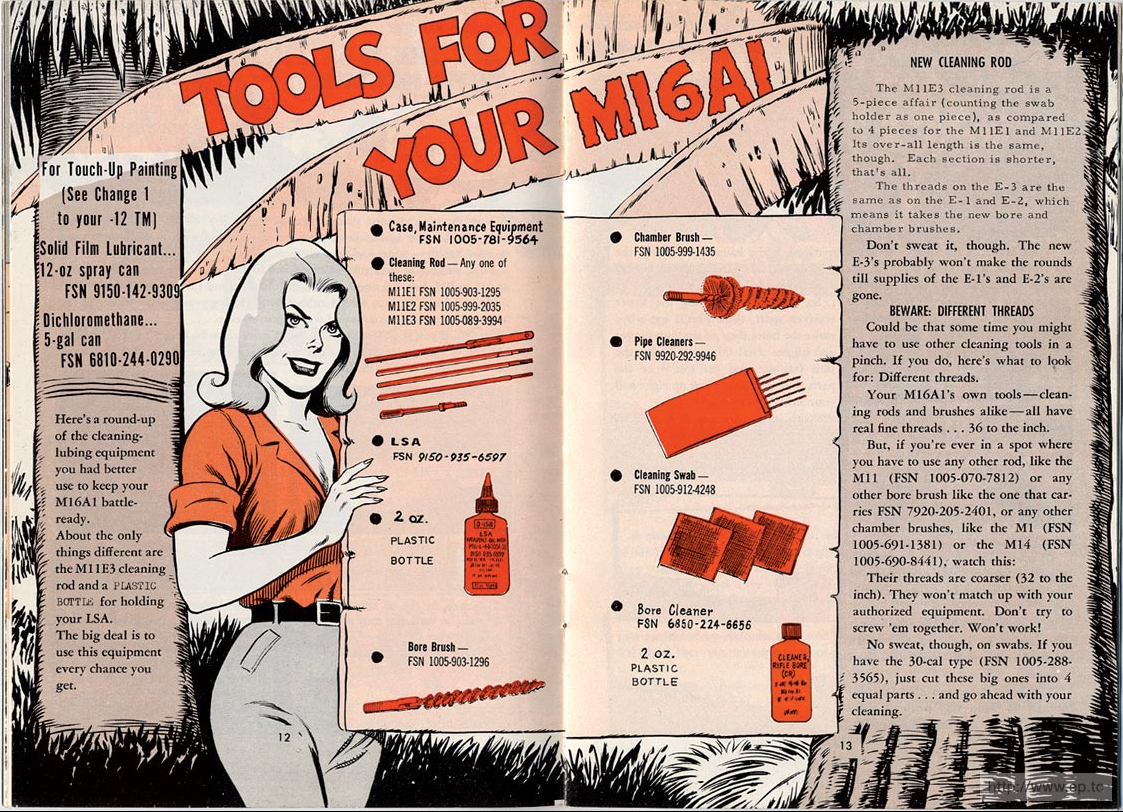
Tools For Your M16

Lessons from M16 Training Manual

=== M16 Comic Book Training Manual ===
M16 Comic Book Training Manual was made in response to the large number of servicemen being sent to Vietnam with varying levels of training and skills. Therefore, the U.S. Army responded by creating a comic to quickly teach and educate the servicemen how to clean and service their M16 rifles. Every soldier deployed to Vietnam received the comic training manual. The main teacher in the educational comic is a character that the soldiers would have difficulty not giving their attention to, a voluptuous blonde female teacher. The lesson titles are risque and provocative, to better get the soldiers attention and make the lessons memorable while deployed.

== War on Terror comics ==
=== America's Heroes: Volume 1 Homecoming ===
America's Heroes: Volume 1 Homecoming is an educative comic published in 2006 and is considered a graphical outreach. The Veteran Affairs (VA), utilizing "America's Heroes: Volume 1 Homecoming" is targeting combat veterans returning from Operations Iraqi Freedom and Enduring Freedom. The comic book series tries to assist their life after deployment and military service and their assimilation to civilian life, "VA is trying something new to help new combat veterans and their families understand the range of benefits and programs VA offers." The comic is focused on educating new veterans about Veteran Affair programs, benefits and services, to assist the new veterans in readjusting and supporting their needs. The back cover of the comic has VA contacts for specific programs. Other comic series targeted at veterans are in the planning process with specific interest to Reserves and National Guard.

=== The Docs ===
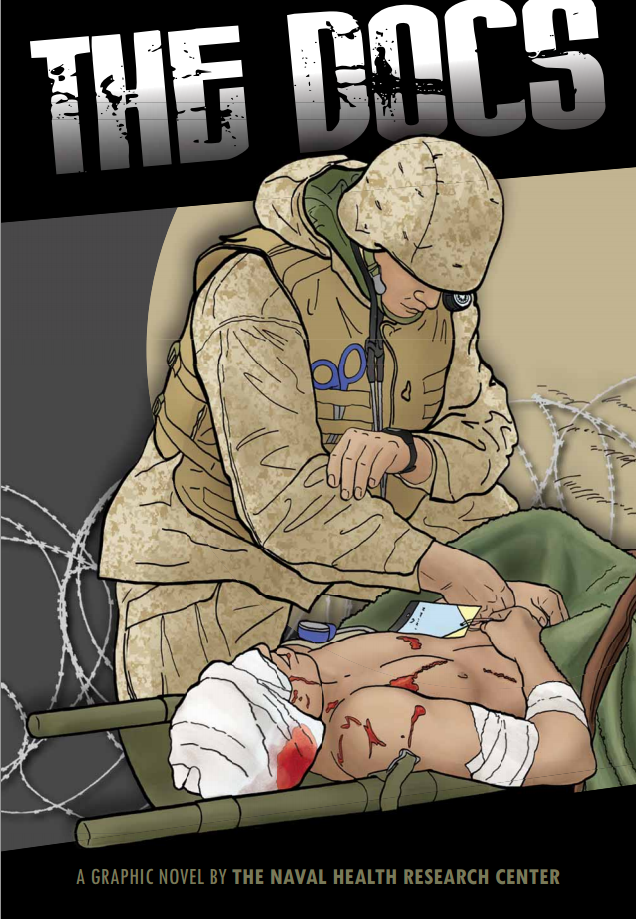
The Docs is the story of four Navy Corpsmen deployed to Iraq.

The Docs is a 200-page graphic novel created and published by the Naval Health Research Center (NHRC) in 2010 and follows four corpsmen and their experiences during Operation Iraqi Freedom. The materials and content for The Docs comic is founded upon the experiences of former lieutenant commander Kraft, a Navy psychologist in Fallujah and her interactions with her patients, when she was deployed in 2004. The Docs was conceived to assist Navy Corpsmen in their deployment and the graphic violence they will witness, "A communication tool to help Navy Corpsmen with the stresses of combat deployments." The reasoning for targeting Navy corpsmen is because of the dual role that they deal with in being medics but also at times being combatants. Capt. Greg Utz, NHRC commanding officer remarks on the dualism of Navy Corpsmen, "Since the start of combat operations in the Middle East, Navy Medicine recognized that expeditionary hospital corpsmen have extremely high exposure to the many significant stressors of war, both acute and chronic."

The comic is a tool to help Navy Corpsmen relate to the four fictional main characters, 19-year-olds Jason Banks and Derek Jackson, 22-year-old Erica Mendez, and 38-year-old John Wallace, in dealing with similar issues of stress, and tension in deployment, "The story follows them as they grapple with having to kill enemy forces; struggle to save the lives of wounded Sailors and Marines; encounter home front problems such as injuries to their children, and other concerns that test their resilience." Each character has different personal issues to overcome and all are faced with life and death situations in the war zone. There is an initiative to follow up the graphic novel into an electronic comic where it will be available through smartphones and computers.

=== America's Army Comic ===
Trailer to America's Army Comic

America's Army Comic is an animated comic and graphic novel produced and published online by the United States Army started in 2002. The comic was made in cooperation with U.S. Special Forces for its accuracy and level of detail, "U.S. Army Special Forces Soldiers ensured the accuracy of every detail from the dialog to the uniforms to the placement of the glow sticks strapped onto the gear of an airborne Long Range Surveillance (LRS) team." It was co-created by Mike Barnett and Marsha Berry, civilian employees of the U.S. Army, and writer M. Zachary Sherman. Barnett's reasoning behind the style and objective of the comics is; "I'm tired of seeing all the crap on TV," he says, recalling shows such as 24 that feature "psychotic" former soldiers. "I want people to understand that our young soldiers put themselves in harm's way for our safety."

The comic is fictional and based upon Operation Iraqi Freedom and Enduring Freedom. The fictitious antagonist country and people are the Czervenians. The Rdo tribe is the protagonist, and is bullied by the Czervenians people. The U.S. intervenes to protect the Rdo tribe. Through the fictional conflict, America's Army Comic demonstrates the values of the American military, "Values of Loyalty, Duty, Respect, Selfless Service, Honor, Integrity and Personal Courage." This comic series is released in electronic version and followed up in print with a new issue released every month and it will be accessible via iPad and Android tablets. The electronic version of the comic is interactive and "players are bound by Rules of Engagement (ROE) and grow in experience as they navigate challenges in team-based, multiplayer, force-on-force operations."

=== The New Avengers ===
The New Avengers comic book series was a joint publication and venture by Marvel Comics and the Army Air Force Exchange Service. The comics were created through a Defense Department program, America Supports You, where companies come together with the Department of Defense to support the U.S. military. William Roseman was a Marvel editor on this project, William Harms was the writer and Tom Raney was the cartoonist. The New Avengers was a military-only comic, specifically created for the U.S. military and is available only to service men. It was first available to U.S. military deployed in Operations Iraqi Freedom and Enduring Freedom and was free. The first edition of The New Avengers was published in May 2005 and the last one was published in December 2010, with a total of 13 issues. The New Avengers is led by Captain America with a cohort of supporting super heroes, which range from the Silver Surfer, Ghost Rider, Thor, Iron Man, Wolverine and others.

The comics and their plots follow a new narrative and deal with military topics and subjects, such as Issue #4, where the superheroes battle enemy forces that are stopping deployed soldiers' letters from getting home to their families in time for Christmas. The creation of new narratives and story-lines allowed the comics to be accessible to new followers and soldiers, without any previous background in the superheroes. Within the comics, there was sweepstakes that was directed toward, current or retired military service men. It was called "Unmask the Hero" sweepstakes and was an opportunity for two service members' renderings to appear in a Marvel comic, "The two winners will be photographed and professionally drawn into the next comic AAFES distributes."

== See also ==
- United States propaganda comics
