= Rebecca Wanzo =

American academic

- Born: Rebecca Ann Wanzo; 1975 (age 50–51); Dayton, Ohio, U.S.
- Occupation: Academic
- Awards: Eisner Award for Best Academic/Scholarly Work (2021)

Academic background
- Education: Miami University; Duke University
- Thesis: The reading cure and other sentimental interventions: reading contemporary sentimentality through African American women's narratives (2003)
- Academic advisor: Andrew Cayton

Academic work
- Institutions: Ohio State University; Washington University in St. Louis
- Website: rebeccawanzo.com

Rebecca Ann Wanzo (born 1975) is an American academic specializing in African-American literature and culture, critical race theory, fan studies, and feminist theory. She is a professor and chair of the women, gender, and sexuality studies department at Washington University in St. Louis. Wanzo's 2020 book, The Content of Our Caricature: African American Comic Art and Political Belonging, won the Eisner Award for Best Academic/Scholarly Work.

== Early life and education ==
Wanzo was born 1975 in Dayton, Ohio. She is the daughter of Margaret Wanzo. She attended Lincoln Elementary and Stivers Middle schools. Wanzo is also a part of Muse Machine, Dayton Art Institute, and Dayton Playhouse. She graduated from Colonel White High School in 1993.

Wanzo majored in English, History, Black World Studies, and American studies at Miami University where she graduated, magna cum laude, in May 1997. Her senior honors thesis advisor was Andrew Cayton who described Wanzo as, "...one of the three or four best students I've seen in 17 years of teaching." Wanzo was one of 95 students nationwide to win a Mellon Fellowship in humanistic studies.

Wanzo completed a Ph.D. in English with certificates in women's studies and African and African American studies at Duke University in 2003. Her dissertation was titled The reading cure and other sentimental interventions: reading contemporary sentimentality through African American women's narratives. Her doctoral advisor was Wahneema H. Lubiano.

== Career ==
Wanzo joined Ohio State University in 2003 as an assistant professor in the departments of women's studies and African American and African studies. She was promoted to associate professor in the departments of women's studies and English in 2009.

In the Fall of 2010, Wanzo joined Arts and Sciences at Washington University in St. Louis as a visiting professor of women, gender, and sexuality studies. She was promoted to associate professor in July 2011 and full professor and chair of women, gender, and sexuality studies in July 2020.

Her 2020 book, The Content of Our Caricature: African American Comic Art and Political Belonging won the Katherine Singer Kovács Book Award of the Society for Cinema and Media Studies, the Charles Hatfield Book Prize of the Comics Studies Society, and the Eisner Award for Best Academic/Scholarly Work.

Wanzo researches African-American literature and culture, critical race theory, fan studies, feminist theory, and the U.S. history of popular fiction, cultural studies, affect theory, and graphic storytelling.

== Selected works ==
- Wanzo, Rebecca (2009). The Suffering Will Not Be Televised: African American Women and Sentimental Political Storytelling. SUNY Press. ISBN 978-1-4384-2882-6.
- Wanzo, Rebecca (2020). The Content of Our Caricature: African American Comic Art and Political Belonging. NYU Press. ISBN 978-1-4798-1363-6.
