= United States propaganda comics =

Comic books

United States propaganda comics are comic books that have been published by various parts of the United States government over time as propaganda tools in various international conflicts.

== Introduction ==
Comic books have historically been used as a tool of influence, starting predominantly in World War II. During World War II, private comic book publishers and later government comic publications increased and gained popularity among the domestic population and Allied forces. The United States used these comics increasingly as World War II concluded and thereafter through the conflicts of the 20th century and into the 21st century. Private companies and the U.S. government would develop comic books to address the Korean War, Vietnam War, Cold War, humanitarian initiatives and the war on terror.

In the war on terror, as stability and social cohesion is pursued, comics have become a medium to achieve such goals, as referenced by Julian Chambliss of Rollins College:

The comic book genre, especially its most popular aspect, the superhero, uses visual cues to reduce individual characters into representations of cultural ideas. This process has allowed characters to become powerful representations of nationalism (Superman), or the search for societal stability (Batman), or struggles over femininity (Wonder Woman). Scholars have established the importance of heroic characterization as a means to inform societal members about collective expectations and behavioral ideas.

== World War II ==
During the outbreak of World War II in Europe, the comic book industry was in its infancy. However, as the war progressed the comic book industry quickly capitalized upon the growing conflict, vilifying the Axis powers and magnifying American patriotism. Comic books and superheroes even alerted citizens of domestic caution and awareness, "pointing out how domestic corporations and criminals, not just foreign villains, sought to undermine American ideals." Eventually as the war evolved, comic book publishers aligned and collaborated with the U.S. military:

Comics brought superheroes into the war effort when the United States finally entered the war. Many writers joined the War Writers Board (WWB), which was established to promote government policy as well as discourage profiteering. While a private organization, the WWB quickly joined forces with the United States Office of War Information. Headed by Elmer Davis, the OWI focused on coordinating all media for the war effort. The comic book creators cooperated with the prevailing attitude of supporting the war.

As soldiers were being deployed to varying theaters of battle, comics accompanied them on their journeys to Europe and Asia, "and in some cases millions, of copies a month were printed" to keep up with the demand for consumption and delivery to foreigners. The American comic book themes and storylines remained consistent:

the American way was a place where science and equality prevailed over ignorance. It reinforced the idea that America was a place where people who worked hard to better themselves could become successful, while looking out for the oppressed at the same time.

In joining the government and private comic industry, they created unified messages. The common and shared purposes of the comics were:

- to unite people behind the war effort;
- to encourage vigilance against enemy spies;
- to rebut Axis propaganda;
- to portray the enemy as immoral, brutal and — especially the Japanese — sub-human;
- to assure the population that the Allies were fighting for a just cause.

=== Private corporations ===
Cover of Action Comics 43

Timely Comics and National Allied Publications became involved in the U.S. war effort during World War II. In propagating the collaborative wartime message of WWII, many superheroes entered the world war II. In exemplification, National Allied Publications, a predecessor to DC Comics, in 1938, introduced Superman in Action Comics #1 and by early 1941; Superman was fighting a Nazi paratrooper in the air. Through the creation and publication of comics, it illustrated the necessity to target the enemies' vulnerabilities in character and reputation. Timely Comics, later to become Marvel Comics, created Captain America and he entered World War II in early 1941: "Captain America dramatically leaped into action on the cover, delivering a knockout punch to Adolf Hitler's jaw." The co-creator of Captain America, Joe Simon, commented on the accessibility of enemy characters and leadership in ridiculing and undermining their position and justifying U.S. involvement in World War II, stating, "Captain America was the first major comic book hero to take a political stand. ... Hitler was a marvelous foil; a ranting maniac."

=== Government comics ===
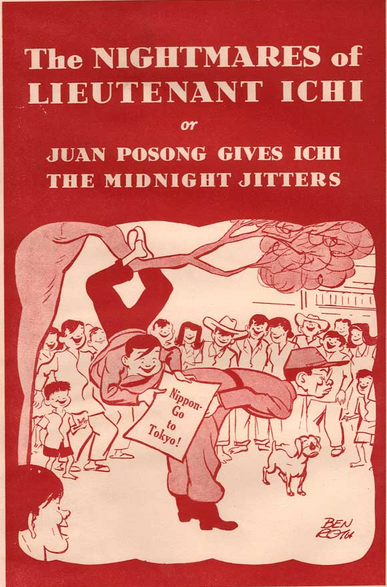
Published by U.S. Office of War Information (OWI) for distribution in the Philippines.

==== The Nightmares Of Lieutenant Ichi or Juan Posong Gives Ichi The Midnight Jitters ====
The Nightmares Of Lieutenant Ichi or Juan Posong Gives Ichi The Midnight Jitters was developed by Ben Roth and published by U.S. Office of War Information (OWI) in Brisbane, Australia during World War II in the Pacific theater. This comic book was disseminated among the Philippine Islands to sustain the morale of the Filipinos and diminish the image of the occupying Japanese. The comic is centered around Juan Posong, a Filipino and his harassment of the Japanese occupying force, especially officer Icho of the Japanese military. It portrays the reliance of Juan Posong and therefore, of the Filipino people while portraying the Japanese as ignorant people who can be easily deceived.

== Korean War comics ==
=== Korea My Home ===
Korea My Home was a comic book created by Al Stenzel and Bill Timmins and published by Johnstone and Cushing in cooperation with the United States Department of State. The comic was an initiative by the U.S. Department of State to create an accessible medium to the average Korean citizen about the purpose of U.S. forces in Korea and the evil goals and ambitions of the communist Korean People's Army (KPA). The comic conveyed the hardships of Koreans because of North Korea's communist regime and the violence and policies they were inflicting upon Korean families. Leonard Rifas described the comic in his thesis, stating, "the story presents a melodramatic interpretation of Korean history from the liberation of Korea from Japanese rule in 1945 to the Chinese intervention on the side of North Korea in 1950."

== Grenada ==
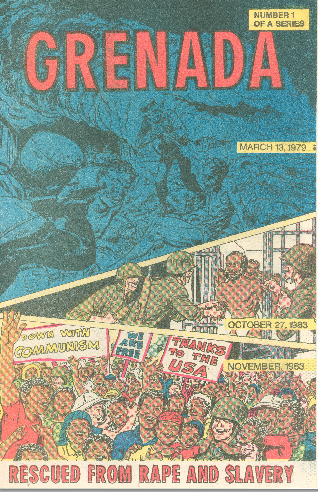
Grenada: "V.O.I.C.E. (Victims of International Communist Emissaries) is sponsoring this booklet to warn you of the imminent totalitarian danger to your rights"

=== Grenada: Rescued from Rape and Slavery ===
Grenada: Rescued from Rape and Slavery is a 14-page comic published in 1984 by the Central Intelligence Agency but ostensibly credited to the non-existent "Victims of International Communist Emissaries." The comic was developed by the Commercial Comic Book Company, the largest American provider of educational comics. The script is by Malcolm Ater and the art by Jack Sparling. Upon completion of the book, Ater, also head of the company, met his CIA connection in a Washington, D.C. taxicab, where he exchanged the art boards for a suitcase full of cash.

The comic, described as "heavy-handed propaganda" by Randy Duncan in The Power of Comics, was airdropped over Grenada prior to the American Invasion of Grenada. The purpose of the Rescued from Rape and Slavery comic was to "justify the American intervention in the country, by describing the rise of communist forces there and how their presence demands military intervention." The comic outlines President Ronald Reagan's justifications for the invasion: alleged oppression and torture of the local inhabitants, threats to American medical students on the island, and a potential domino effect leading to more Communist governments in the Caribbean.

== Nicaragua ==
=== The Freedom Fighter's Manual ===
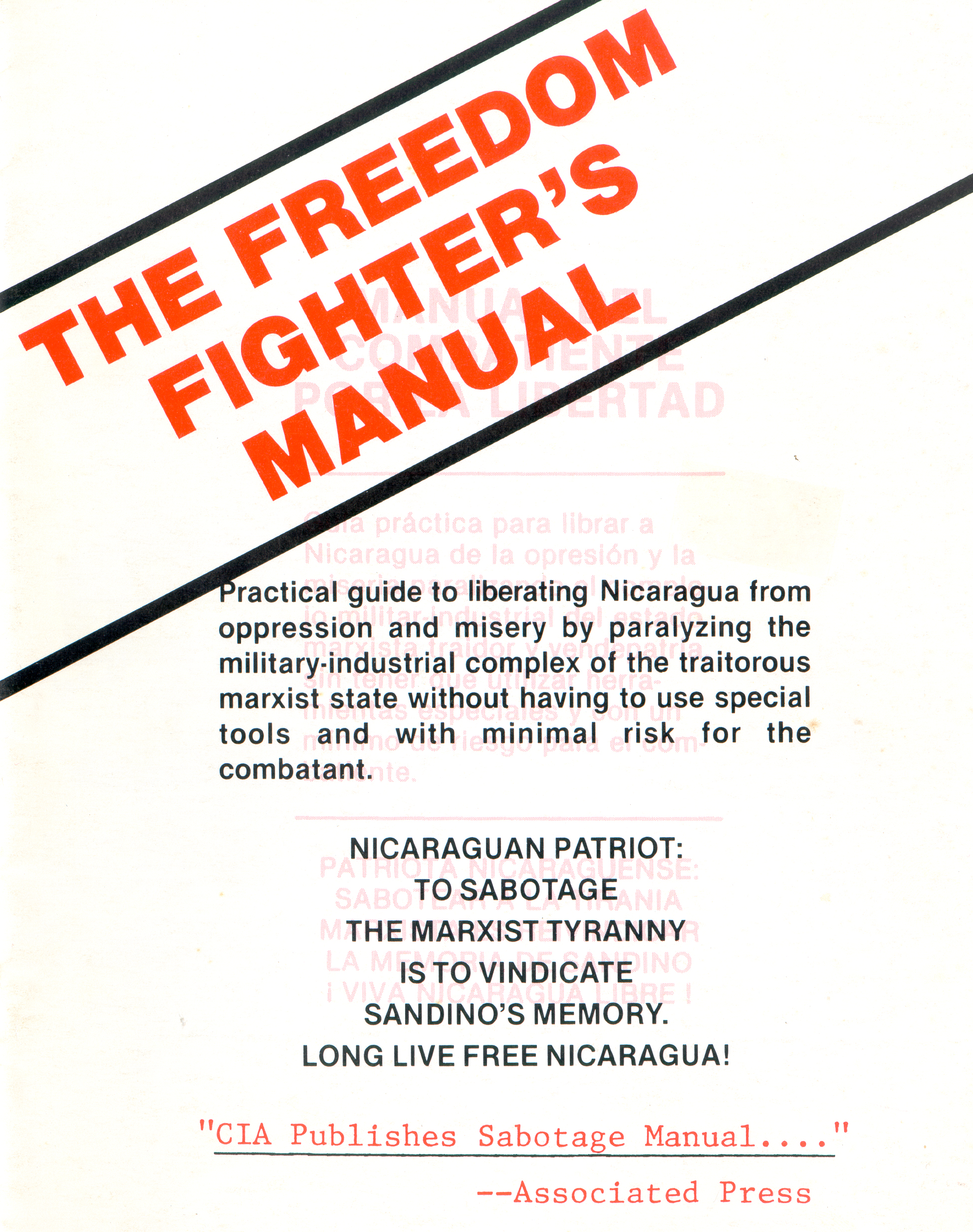
The Freedom Fighter's Manual

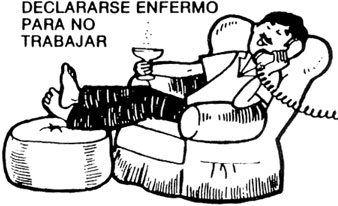
A graphic from a de-classified CIA manual air-dropped over Nicaragua in the 1980s

The Freedom Fighter's Manual was published January 28, 1985 as part of the United States government's aid to the Contras in the Nicaraguan Revolution. The instructional manual comic book introduces the guerrilla to various techniques, up to and including terrorism, that resistance movements can utilize in the conflict with the Sandinista National Liberation Front. The manual was developed by the Central Intelligence Agency as part of their covert activities in Nicaragua. The manual offered instructions for non-violent activities such as work slowdowns, minor sabotage and wasting resources. However, it also offered instructions on how to set fires with makeshift time fuses, demonstrated the making of Molotov cocktails and suggested using them to firebomb government buildings such as police stations. The comic book states it is a "practical guide to liberating Nicaragua from oppression and misery by paralyzing the military–industrial complex of the traitorous Marxist state without having to use special tools and with minimal risk for the combatant." The comic also reasons the necessity and ultimate goal of guerilla warfare:

guerrilla warfare is essentially a political war. Therefore, its area of operations exceeds the territorial limits of conventional warfare, to penetrate the political entity itself: the political animal that Aristotle defined.

== Humanitarian initiatives ==
In the 1990s and the early 2000s the United States collaborated with DC Comics and UNICEF to educate foreign audiences, especially children, about the dangers of landmines. DC Comics has donated the usage of Superman and Wonder Woman to the Department of Defense and the United Nations in this collaborative initiative. Each edition of the comic book reflected the targeted audience and region, assured through partnership with the U.S. Army 1st PSYOP Battalion.

=== Superman: Deadly Legacy ===
Superman: Deadly Legacy spearheaded the first installment of the landmine comics in 1996. It targeted the older children of the former Yugoslavia, to educate them about the reality of unaccounted landmines and the danger they pose. It is estimated that between four and six million land mines were laid during the conflict in the former Yugoslavia. In making the comics accessible they were published in the Roman and Cyrillic alphabet. To increase the comic's popularity and reach of children, the comics were first distributed in orphanages, schools, refugee camps, and hospitals. Through the comic, the children are encouraged to share their education with their friends and family to spread further awareness. The message is, "children must learn how to avoid danger zones where anti-personnel mines are hidden -- and they don't need Superman to keep them safe." In Deadly Legacy, Superman

tells the story of two boys in Bosnia. They are walking along a road looking for a friend when one bends down to pick up some debris from a mortar. Quickly, Superman pulls him away, and the boy narrowly misses stepping on a mine concealed underground. As the boys continue to search for their friend, Superman teaches them how to I avoid places where land mines might be hidden: bombed-out houses, abandoned buildings, old checkpoints and lines. Even paths and bridges are sometimes littered with land mines, Superman explains.

NATO distributed over a million comics within the first year.

=== Superman and Wonder Woman: The Hidden Killer ===
The second installment of the landmine comics was a dual effort between Superman and Wonder Woman in The Hidden Killer. This comic was released through UNICEF in Latin America in 1998 and the comic was published in both Spanish and English. The distribution effort ranged from Army Special Forces to U.S. Embassies and local governments. A third installment was targeted for Angola and is in Portuguese.

=== Batman: Death of Innocents ===
Batman: Death of Innocents was published in 1996, paralleling the Superman landmine comics, DC also unveiled a graphic novel for publication starring Batman and his message about landmines. The graphic novel is authored by Dennis O'Neil. This comic takes place in a fictitious land named Kravian and its goal is to highlight the overall danger of landmines and the inability of landmines to discriminate between civilian and military personnel. Batman is drawn into the conflict of Kravia when some of his employees encounter landmines are injured and killed by them.

== War on terror ==
In utilizing psychological warfare and comics in the war on terror, the U.S. military had to alter its approach. It changed the understanding of what is and constitutes a superhero. A Stars and Stripes article by Allison Batdorff in September 2007 highlights this point:

Getting into the Iraqi male mind-set requires a shift in focus for the average American ... For instance, you wouldn't self-aggrandize when recruiting Iraqi men to join the local police force. The lone-hero-with-badge-and-gun appeal wouldn't work here. You would talk about how joining the Iraqi Security Forces would reflect honor on their families, tribes and community.

U.S. Army Capt. Andrew Duprey comments further on the necessity to alter the image and concept of superheroes so they are relatable, "The concept of honor is paramount," and "Instead of emphasizing the individual, it's the collective that counts."

=== Afghanistan ===
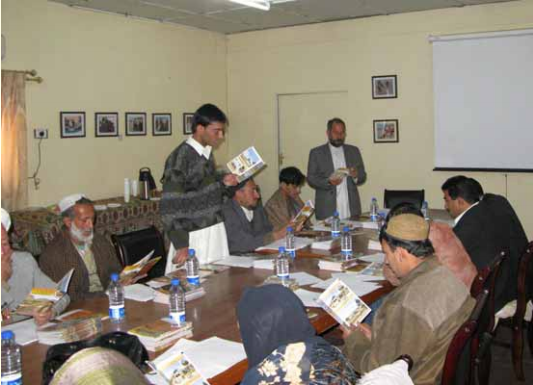
Sixteen teachers pursue new classroom materials they will introduce to their colleagues atschools across Kandahar City

==== Meet Yassin and Kaka Rawoof comics ====
Meet Yassin and Kaka Rawoof are information programs by the coalition forces in Afghanistan. The comic is discussed in the Coalition Bulletin of January 2008. Camp Nathan Smith held a training workshop, in Kandahar City, for Afghani educators on new educational texts and tools for their students and fellow teachers. The educational materials included "six comic books designed to teach children about their rights and duties as citizens of Afghanistan." The comic book series were donated by USAID and began dissemination on December 10, 2007 through January 20, 2008. During this period of distribution, parallel radio and TV programs of the same characters aired on Tuesday and Thursday evenings at 7:00 pm. A participating teacher commented on the value of the educational comics, stating, "These comic books are very valuable for the young generation of Afghanistan and will help them out to know how to seek their cultural rights." The education program targeted grades 1, 2, 3 and was only initially done in Kandahar City.

==== Afghan Commandos ====
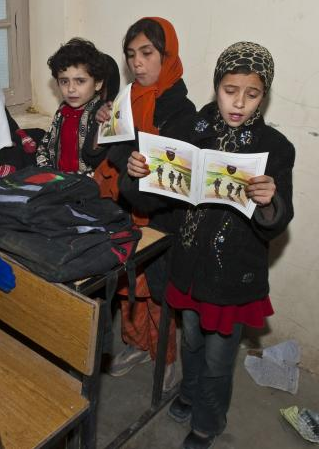
Comic book given by Afghan soldiers with 3rd Commando Kandak

The Afghan Commandos comic book conveys an exemplary scenario where the Afghan Commandos apprehend the Taliban and protect the civilians from an explosive. The comic takes a story of a child hurt by a terrorist bomb and the commandos arrive at the village to assess what happened and inquire about the people responsible. Through the conversation, important lessons are conveyed, like the anonymity of identity of the informants, for fear of retaliation. The commandos act upon the information gathered and capture the Taliban members while the villagers rejoice.

The Afghan Commandos, such as the 3rd Commando Kandak, traveled to local schools to engage the children and provide for the community on another level than their regular duties and missions. They distributed comics to the school children. The comics also contain short stories about the life and purpose of the Afghan Commandos and their efforts to protect the citizens from the Taliban.

=== Iraq ===
==== Iraqi Freedom/Nation Building Comic Books ====
Iraqi Freedom/Nation Building Comic Books program originated from the United States Central Command. The aspiration of the comics are to create respect and harmony between the Iraqi forces (police and military) and the Iraqi civilians, especially the children.

==== Sixth Brigade 2006 ====
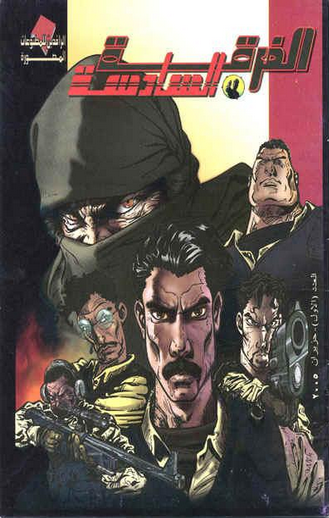
Cover page of 6th Brigade comic

Sixth Brigade is a comic book series that has been put forth by the U.S. government in 2008. The comic's purpose is to improve the relationship between the U.S. military and Iraqi forces with the Iraqi civilians while also creating support and increased communication. The secondary cause is to

highlight the professionalism of the Iraqi Special Operations Forces (ISOF) and to enhance the public perception of the Iraqi Security Forces (ISF) as a capable, well-trained, and professional fighting force IAW Information Operations Objectives ...

In response to changing the format of superhero characters, the Sixth Brigade took a collective superhero approach in connecting to its audience, as outlined in a US Army training guide:

The Sixth brigade is the elite soldiers of Iraqi Special Forces. They fight insurgents and evil leaders to support Iraqi nationalism. Their superpowers are based on teamwork that conquests terrorism. They show that fighting for Iraq as a soldier defines honor and patriotism.

The Lincoln Group received the contract to produce and publish the Sixth Brigade comics with a goal of 12 issues and 60,000 copies per issue.

==== Iraqi Police Comic Book PSYOP ====
The Iraqi Police Comic Book was produced as an information operation by the 4th Military Information Support Group in 2005. The comic is written in Arabic and is targeted to Iraqi youth. In targeting the youth, the comics seek to create respect and honor for the Iraqi police. In building up the Iraqi police through exemplifying the respect and honor, the comic seeks to recruit Iraqi youth into the police force. The comic demonstrates the mission and principles of the Iraqi police force, thereby making it a worthy service that engages in a noble activity. Beyond recruitment, the comics, "provides the opportunity for Iraqi youth to learn lessons, develop role models and improve their education."

=== Philippines ===
==== Barbargsa — Blood of the Honorable ====
Barbargsa — Blood of the Honorable is a PSYOP comic that was developed for the Philippines in response to growing radical Islam within certain sections of the country. The comic Barbargsa was conceived in 2006 by the Military Information Support Team for the Joint Special Operations Task Force Philippines mission and were responsible for the inception and development of the comic.

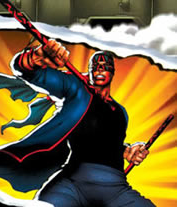
Barbargsa — Blood of the Honorable

In the development of the comic, the creators understood their target audience by giving attention to the local Tausug culture and Sulu region in developing the comic:

Two years ago, two Army officers decided to create one from scratch to tell the children of the Sulu Islands the story of what was happening in their homeland ... The Philippines military are also portrayed in a positive and heroic light while the villains are the terrorists or "bandits." The creators were careful to accurately illustrate the Sulu region, and use character names, clothing and mannerisms that reflect the culture of the Tausug ethnic group.

The main character is Ameer, a student of kuntao, a local martial art. Ameer is a citizen vigilante who vows to protect the lives of people threatened and affected by terrorism after he returns home from working abroad and witnesses the confluence of violence in his hometown. The actions of Ameer shadow the theme of the comic, good vs. evil, as highlighted by Maj. Edward Lopacienski: "In the end you see the hero and the community rising up to turn over the terrorists." Beyond placing Ameer in local culture and settings, he also deals with previous terrorist events of the Abu Sayyaf Group. Some of these events include the Sulu Co-op bombing in March 2006 and the Basilan hostage crisis were the Abu Sayyaf Group used schoolchildren as body shields from the Filipino police and military.

The comic book character Ameer has become popular and local vendors have printed unauthorized shirts with his image. Over 600,000 of the 10-issue series have been distributed through the island and are in both English and local Filipino dialect.

== The 99 ==
The 99 is a comic book series created by Naif Al-Mutawa and his comic book company, AK Comics in Egypt. The superheroes are based upon Islamic religion and culture, although the heroes do not identify themselves as Muslim. The comic premiered in 2006 but has grown so well that it is translated into nine languages. The consistent theme throughout all the comics, as the superheroes battle varying evils, is diversity and tolerance. Al-Mutawa states, a "new generation of comic book heroes fight more than crime -- they smash stereotypes and battle extremism."

Sumayyah Meehan from the Muslim Media Network commented on the comics, stating,

All the characters in "The 99" are the epitome of kindness, generosity, wisdom and honesty, which are core Islamic values. Al-Mutawa uses "The 99" to spread a message of peace that the world really needs to hear.

The comic is named after the 99 attributes of Allah. Each superhero has one of Allah's attributes and the superhero exemplifies how best to embody and use such an attribute. The superhero demonstrates this by defeating evil and overcoming diversity, as explained by Naif Al-Mutawa. In coordination with the idea of teamwork,

Each of the 99 possesses a certain gemstone that has imbued in it a special power. While each of our heroes has their own power, each of their powers is enhanced by working in teams of three.

In 2011, The 99 teamed up with DC Comics for a joint comic series with the Justice League for six comics. As of March 2013, The 99 has become a television show through partnership with the Cartoon Network to air in Australia, Asia and Europe.

== Japan ==
=== Manga CVN 73 ===
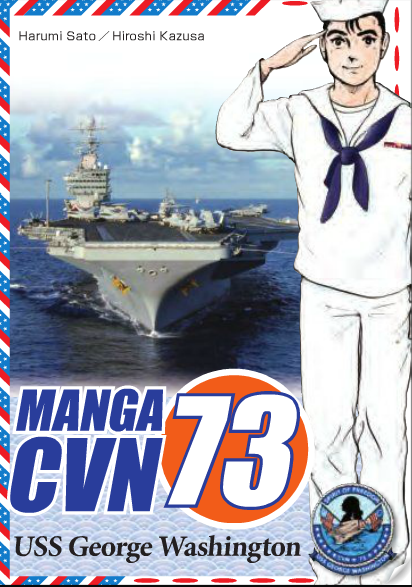
CVN 73 cover page with Jack O'Hara

Manga CVN 73 is a 200-page manga comic book created by the United States Navy in 2007 and released in 2008. The comic is in Japanese, and was written in order to educate and influence the Japanese population about the homeporting of the USS George Washington (CVN-73), a nuclear powered supercarrier, at Yokosuka Naval Base in 2008. The homeporting had been the object of some controversy, drawing vocal support and opposition from various groups in Japan.

CVN 73's main character is Damage Controlman 3rd Class Jack O'Hara. Jack serves in the United States Navy aboard the aircraft carrier George Washington, and the comic follows O'Hara, an American of Japanese descent, as he gets into all kinds of comic situations all over the ship. He is mentored by Petty Officer 1st Class Elly Benton. During his sea tour, Jack encounters many issues and scenarios typical of a U.S. sailor, such as getting seasick and lost, reprimanded for arriving late to his duty station and bruising his shins on the knee-knockers.

The manga comic book style was adopted in creating the comic because of its popularity within the Japanese population and the ability for its people to connect to the comic and main character, Jack O'Hara. In the development of the comic, the navy utilized and referenced several notable geographical features within Japan, so the Japanese citizenry can easily recognize the adventures of Jack.

== See also ==
- Buz Sawyer
