= Ian Gordon (historian) =

Australian academic

Ian Gordon is a cultural historian. He writes on comic strips and comic books and film and television.

== Background ==
Gordon earned a PhD in history at the University of Rochester. In 2015-16 he offered a Superhero Entertainments MOOC through the Coursera platform. He taught History and Media Studies for many years in Singapore. Many of his publications can be found on Zenodo.

== Comic Strips and Consumer Culture ==
Gordon uses comic strips to make an argument about American culture. He says that comic strips were one of the first forms of truly national culture, by which he means people all over the country read them on the same day, and so had shared experiences, and that this happened on a widespread basis as early as 1908. He also ties comic strips to transformations in advertising styles, and not just the comic strip advertising style of the 1930s but the generalized use of more images in advertising as the twentieth century progressed. The book even has a chapter on the beginnings of comic books, which is a useful short overview and has good information on the early Superman. On 11 April 2011 he created an online version of the book which can be found at doi.org/10.5281/zenodo.18253782.

The Journal of American History said: "Gordon has done historians a service by recognizing the importance of popular visual sources as important clues to understanding American culture. And the book is not only informative but fun to read."

American Journalism said: "a must read for any scholar interested in the question of popular culture."

== Superman: The Persistence of an American Icon ==
This book addresses Superman's place in American culture and discusses the way the character was shaped through interactions between writers, artists, editors, publishers, and readers. Gordon looks at Superman in his many media versions and also licensed items.

Writing in Choice John Lent said "the research for Superman: The Persistence of an American Icon is extraordinarily rich, the analysis is meticulously conceived and implemented, and the writing is clear and interesting, spiced with anecdotes, asides, and quotes."

== The Comics of Charles Schulz: The Good Grief of Modern Life ==
On April 26, 2018 this book was nominated for an Eisner Award for best scholarly work on comics.

== Selected works ==
- Comic Strips and Consumer Culture, 1890-1945. (Washington, DC: Smithsonian Institution Press, 1998).
- Comics and Ideology. co-edited. (New York: Peter Lang, 2001).
- Film and Comic Books. co-edited. (Jackson: University Press of Mississippi, 2007)
- Kid Comic Strips: A Genre Across Four Countries. (New York: Palgrave, 2016).
- The Comics of Charles Schulz: The Good Grief of Modern Life. co-edited. (Jackson: University Press of Mississippi, 2017).
- Superman: The Persistence of an American Icon. (New Brunswick: Rutgers University Press, 2017).
- Ben Katchor: Conversations. edited. (Jackson: University Press of Mississippi, 2018).
- The Superhero Symbol: Media, Culture, and Politics. (New Brunswick: Rutgers University Press, 2019).
