= Kent Worcester =

American writer and musician

Kent Worcester (born 1959) is an American political scientist, historian, comics critic, and songwriter. His work deals with popular culture, intellectual history, trade unions, and social democracy. He has written extensively on comics and graphic novels and wrote a biography of C. L. R. James, the West Indian intellectual, among many other publications.

== Biography ==
Worcester received his B.A. in economics and political science from the University of Massachusetts Boston and his M.A., M.Phil., and Ph.D. in political science from Columbia University. From 1990 to 2000, Worcester was a program director at the Social Science Research Council, a nonprofit organization that promotes interdisciplinary research in the social sciences. He is currently a professor of political science at Marymount Manhattan College.

== Publications ==
Worcester is an important contributor to the growing body of critical literature on comics and graphic novels. His writings place particular emphasis on their social and political impact and subtext. Worcester has been contributing to The Comics Journal (print and web versions) since 1993, and was a blogger for tcj.com from 2008-2010. He coedited A Comics Studies Reader (2008) with Jeet Heer. The book received the Peter C. Rollins Book Award in 2009 for its contribution to popular culture and American studies. Worcester, Heer, and Charles Hatfield co-edited The Superhero Reader (2013), which was nominated for an Eisner Award for Best Academic/Scholarly Work in 2014.

Worcester is the author of C.L.R. James: A Political Biography (1996), which was part of a resurgence of scholarly interest in the life and work of the Caribbean writer, socialist, and anticolonial activist.

Other works by Kent Worcester include studies of trade union responses to neoliberal economic restructuring from the 1970s to the 1990s in Britain, the United States, and Europe. He wrote a history of the Social Science Research Council, which was commissioned by then President Kenneth Prewitt for the organization’s 75th anniversary in 2001. Worcester edited a collection of essays for the American Political Science Association, Navigating Political Science (2018), which deals with professional concerns in the field and with theoretical and methodological questions.

== Songwriter ==
In the 1980s Worcester was a songwriter, singer, and rhythm guitarist for the satirical rock band The Dog’s Breakfast. He wrote "Changes", "Father Song", "New York", and "Paul is Dead" for the group's album Beautiful Banality. He contributed several songs to recordings by guitarist and songwriter Matt Backer: "Landlocked" for the album Is That All? (2001); "The Impulse Man", "Oh No Don't Cry", and "Once in a While" for the album The Impulse Man (2006); and "Assiduous Polygamy" and "I'm No Fool" for the album Idle Hands (2012). In 2019 he released a self-produced EP, That’s Why I Surf; and another in 2021, A Million Candles, both on Bandcamp. In 2020 the independent music website Divide & Conquer interviewed Worcester about his music, his work with Backer and The Dog's Breakfast, and the connections between comics and popular music. In a 2022 review of Worcester’s most recent release, “Soviet America,” Jamie Funk described Worcester’s entire Bandcamp output as “pure and genuine.”

== Bibliography ==
- Trade Union Politics: American Unions and Economic Change, 1960s-1990s. 1995. Humanities Press, coedited with Glenn Perusek.
- C.L.R. James: A Political Biography. 1996. SUNY Press.
- Violence and Politics: Globalization's Paradox. 2000. Routledge, coedited with Sally Avery Bermanzohn and Mark Ungar.
- The Social Science Research Council, 1923-1998. 2001. SSRC.
- Arguing Comics: Literary Masters on a Popular Medium. 2004. University Press of Mississippi, coedited with Jeet Heer.
- A Comics Studies Reader. 2008. University Press of Mississippi, coedited with Jeet Heer.
- The Superhero Reader. 2013. University Press of Mississippi, coedited with Charles Hatfield and Jeet Heer.
- Silent Agitators: Cartoon Art From the Pages of New Politics. 2016. New Politics Associates.
- Peter Bagge: Conversations. 2016. University Press of Mississippi.
- Peter Kuper: Conversations. 2018. University Press of Mississippi.
- Navigating Political Science: Professional Advancement and Success in the Discipline. 2018. American Political Science Association.
- From MORI to Magna Carta: The Selected Writings of Sir Robert Worcester, Vols. 1 & 2. 2021-2022. IndieBooks, London. Robert Worcester, author; Kent Worcester, editor.
- Pi Sigma Alpha: A Centennial History. 2022. Pi Sigma Alpha.
- A Cultural History of The Punisher: Marvel Comics and the Politics of Vengeance. 2023. Intellect Ltd, University of Chicago Press.
