= Canadian Society for the Study of Comics =

Academic society

- Abbreviation: CSSC
- Established: October 2010 (16 years ago)
- Types: learned society
- Country: Canada
- Website: www.comicsscholars.ca

Canadian Society for the Study of Comics (CSSC), also known as Société Canadienne pour l'Étude de la Bande Dessinée (SCEBD), is a bilingual community of academics focused in discuss all aspects of comics as an art form and cultural phenomenon. The society was founded in October 2010 by University of Regina professor Sylvain Rheault.

CSSC/SCEBD uses both English and French (official Canada languages) and its association is open for Canadian and international scholars. Although it has a greater focus on Canadian comics, the society supports and encourages the study of comics in any language and in a range of disciplines and cultural contexts.

The first CSSC annual conference was held in May 2011 as part of Andrew Lesk's New Narrative Conferences. In 2014, the CSSC started a partnership with Toronto Comics Art Festival (TCAF) and the conference started to take place during the event until 2018. Since 2019, the CSSC conference became part of Congress of the Humanities and Social Science, hosted each year by a different Canadian university.
