= Julian C. Chambliss =

American history professor (born 1971)

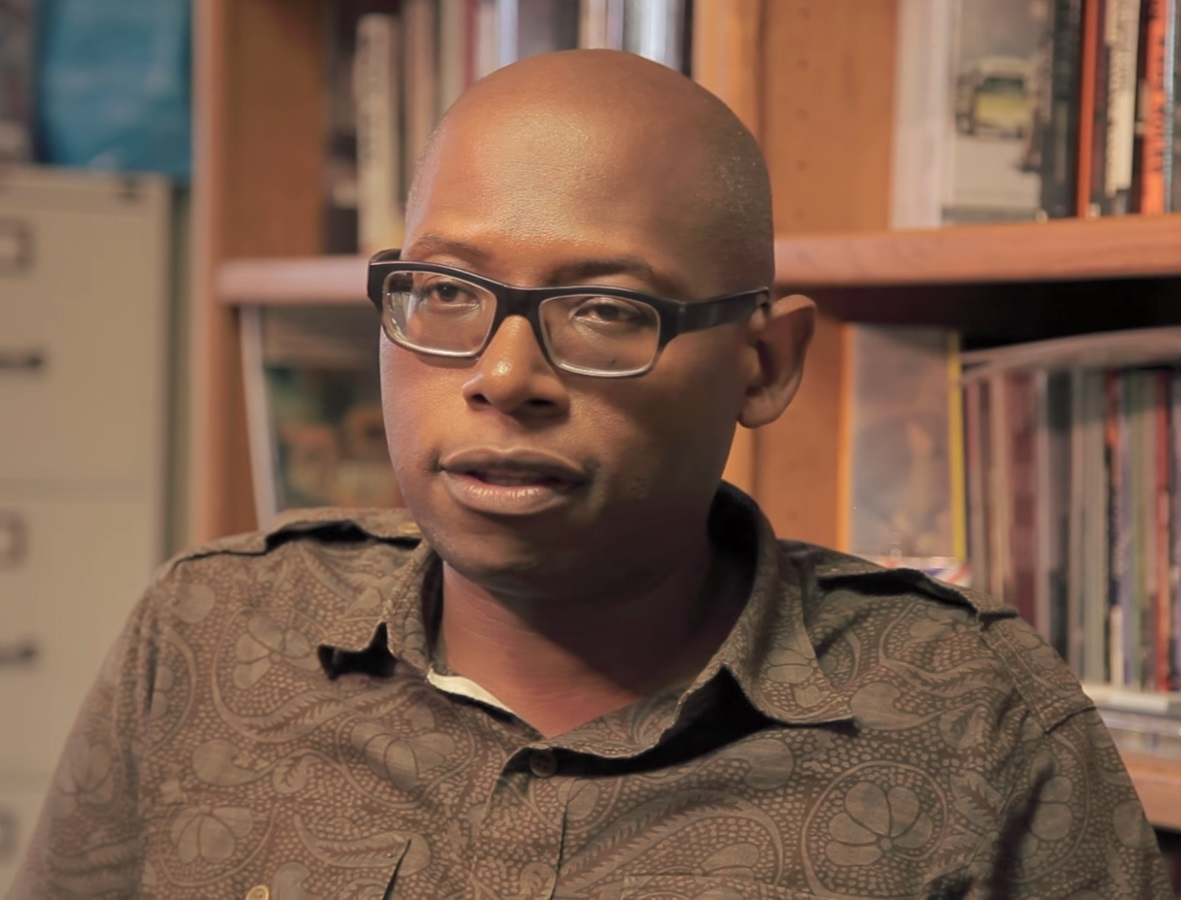
- Chambliss interviewed by Heed Magazine in 2016
- Born: 1971 (age 54–55)
- Education: University of Florida
- Occupation: History professor
- Scientific career
- Fields: Literary studies, comics studies
- Workplaces: Rollins
- Website: www.julianchambliss.com/exhibition-curation

Julian C. Chambliss (born 1971) is professor of history at Michigan State University and previously taught at Rollins College in Winter Park, Florida, and is primarily known as a scholar of the real and imagined city and on comics. He served as coordinator of the Africa and African-American Studies Program at Rollins. He is the Coordinator of the Media, Arts, and Culture Special Interest Section for the Florida Conference of Historians. His work is in critical making; notable projects include Project Mosaic: Zora Neale Hurston, Advocate Recovered, and Oscar Mack.

== Career ==
Julian C. Chambliss graduated from the University of Florida in 2004, after completing work on his dissertation on middle-class activism and city beautiful movement in Chicago and Atlanta. Since then, he has taught at Rollins College, and currently teaches at Michigan State University

== Selected bibliography ==
- Ages of Heroes, Eras of Men: Superheroes and the American Experience
- Cities Imagined: The African Diaspora in Media and History
- Future Bear, hybrid comic project created by Rachel Simmons and Julian C. Chambliss
- Black Perspectives, edited by Julian C. Chambliss and Walter D. Greason
- Article about Julian C. Chambliss in Artborne magazine
- Black Superhero Documentart
- "The Ballad of Oscar Mack", news story on critical making project by Julian C. Chambliss
- Article by Julian C. Chambliss in the Boston Review
- Project Mosaic: Zora Neale Hurston, Digital Humanities and Public Humanities scholarly work by Julian C. Chambliss et al.
- Advocate Recovered, Digital Humanities project by Julian C. Chambliss
- "TED Talk" by Julian C. Chambliss
