= International Journal of Comic Art =

- Discipline: Comics studies
- Peer-reviewed: No
- Language: English
- Edited by: John A. Lent

Publication details
- History: Since 1999
- Publisher: John A. Lent (United States)
- Frequency: Biannual

Standard abbreviations
- ISO 4: Int. J. Comic Art

Indexing
- ISSN: 1531-6793
- LCCN: sn99026643
- OCLC no.: 41261901

Links
- Journal homepage; Online tables of content

The International Journal of Comic Art is a biannual journal about comics art. It was established in 1999 by John A. (short for "Anthony") Lent (Temple University). The journal was established to create a new venue for scholars to publish academic work on comics. John Anthony Lent, the creator of the journal was born on September 8, 1936, and died on May 16, 2026, at the age of 89, due to injuries he suffered from a fall at his home a few days earlier.

A parody, Interplanetary Journal of Comic Art: A Festschrift in Honor of John Lent, edited by Michael Rhode and including a back cover by Ralph Steadman, was presented to Lent for his 70th birthday. A sequel, InterGalactic Journal of Comic Art (IGJOCA) Prospectus: John A. Lent 90th Birthyear Fanzine, was due to be presented to Lent for his 90th birthday in 2026 but he died before his birthday, work is continuing on it regardless as a tribute to his life and work.
