= Jeet Heer =

Canadian writer

- Born: India
- Occupation: Writer
- Notable work: A Comics Studies Reader (2008)

Jeet Heer is a Canadian author, comics critic, literary critic and journalist. He is a national affairs correspondent for The Nation magazine and a former staff writer at The New Republic. Other publications for which he has written include the National Post, The New Yorker, The Paris Review, and the Virginia Quarterly Review. Heer was a member of the 2016 jury for the Scotiabank Giller Prize. His anthology A Comics Studies Reader, with Kent Worcester, won the 2010 Rollins Book Award. Since May 2022, he has hosted The Time of Monsters with Jeet Heer podcast, referring to a famous, if possibly distorted, quotation from Italian Marxist Antonio Gramsci.

Heer was born to Indian parents and was raised as a Sikh.

== Selected works ==
- Arguing Comics: Literary Masters on a Popular Medium. Jackson: University Press of Mississippi, 2004. ISBN 1578066867 (edited with Kent Worcester)
- A Comics Studies Reader. Jackson: University Press of Mississippi, 2008. ISBN 978-1604731095(edited with Kent Worcester)
- The Superhero Reader. Jackson: University Press of Mississippi, 2014. ISBN 1-61703-806-7 (edited with Kent Worcester and Charles Hatfield)
- Too Asian?: Racism, Privilege, and Post-Secondary Education. Toronto: Between the Lines, 2012 ISBN 978-1926662787(edited with Michael C.K. Ma, Davina Bhandar and R.J. Gilmour)
- In Love with Art: Françoise Mouly's Adventures in Comics with Art Spiegelman. Ontario: Chapter House Books, 2013 ISBN 978-1770563506
- Sweet Lechery. Ontario: The Porcupine's Quill, 2014. ISBN 978-0889843783
