= South Bronx =

Region of New York City

Coordinates: 40.81621°N 73.91735°W

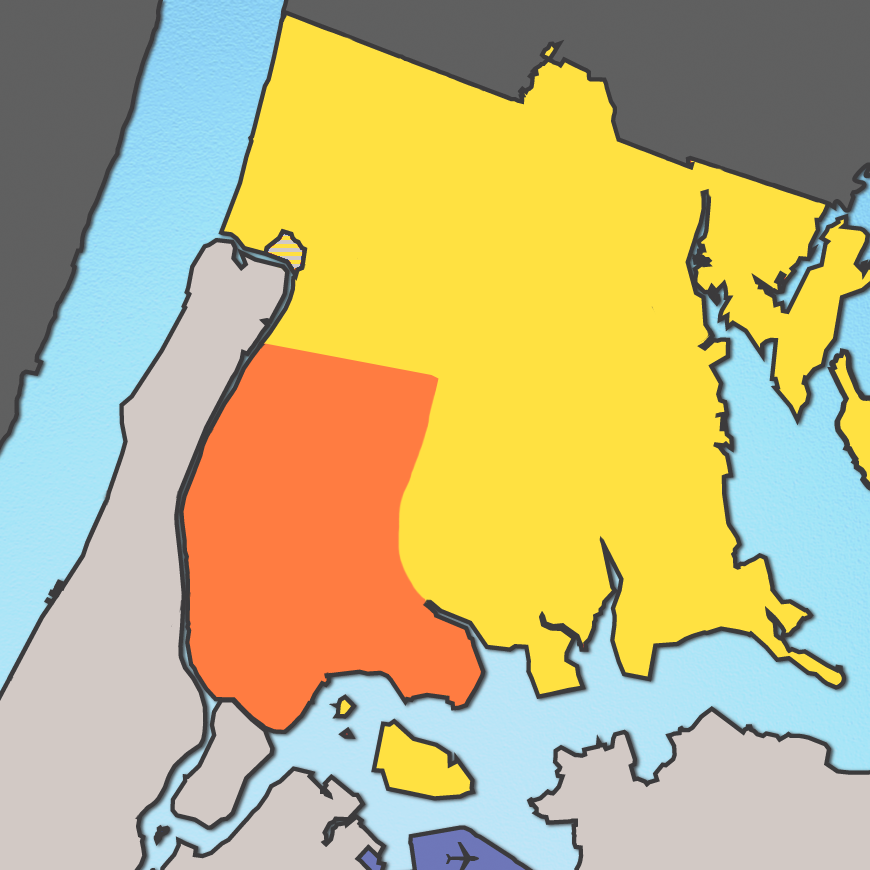
South Bronx in orange; the rest of the borough is in yellow. The actual boundaries of the South Bronx are undefined.

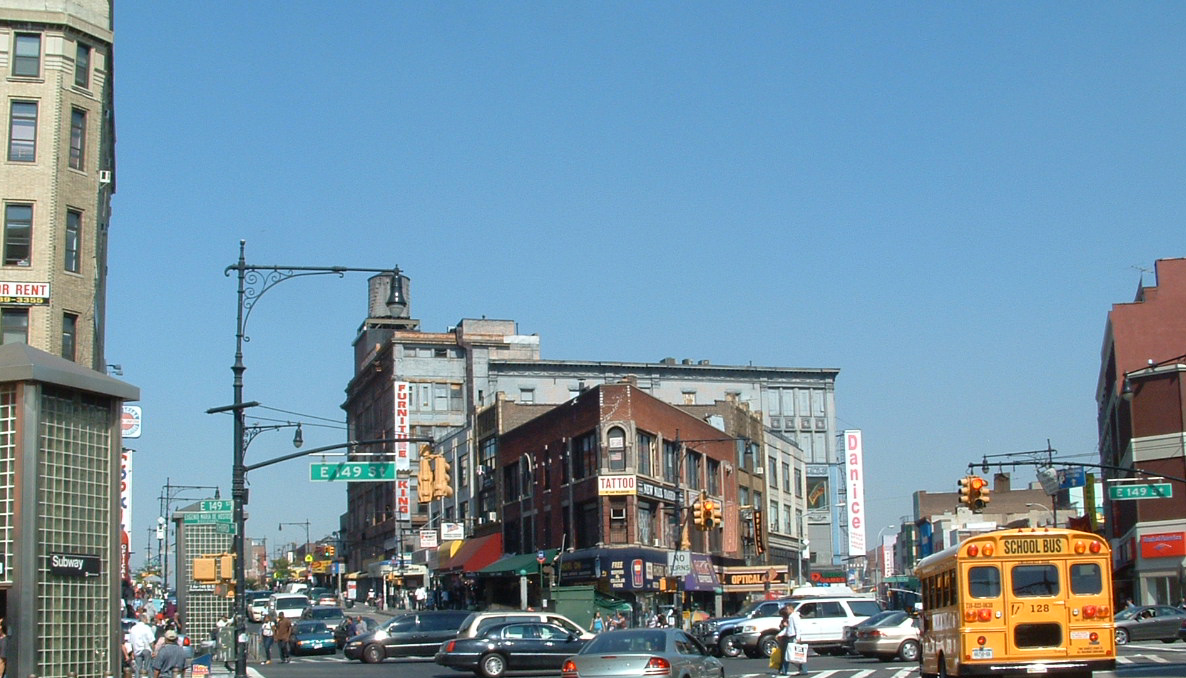
The Hub is the retail heart of the South Bronx.

The South Bronx is an area of the New York City borough of the Bronx. The area comprises neighborhoods in the southern part of the Bronx, such as Grand Concourse, Mott Haven, Melrose, and Port Morris.

In the early 1900s, the South Bronx was originally known as the Manor of Morrisania, as it was the manor of Lewis Morris. As the Morris family continued to expand on the land, an influx of German and Irish immigrants started to populate the area. By the 1930s, the Bronx was considered the "Jewish Borough", as nearly half the population was Jewish. This soon changed as World War II caused rent to increase in many apartments, pushing people out. By the end of the 1950s, the South Bronx was two-thirds African American or Hispanic (of any race).

The South Bronx is known for its hip-hop culture and graffiti. Graffiti became popular in the Bronx in the early 1970s, spreading through the New York City Subway system. The South Bronx also became notable as the 1973 birthplace of hip-hop music and culture. The South Bronx in recent years has reported dramatic drops in crime reaching levels not seen since the 1950s.

As of the 2010 American Community Survey, the South Bronx had the poorest congressional district in the United States. This statement was reiterated in the media in 2024 and 2025.

== Boundaries ==
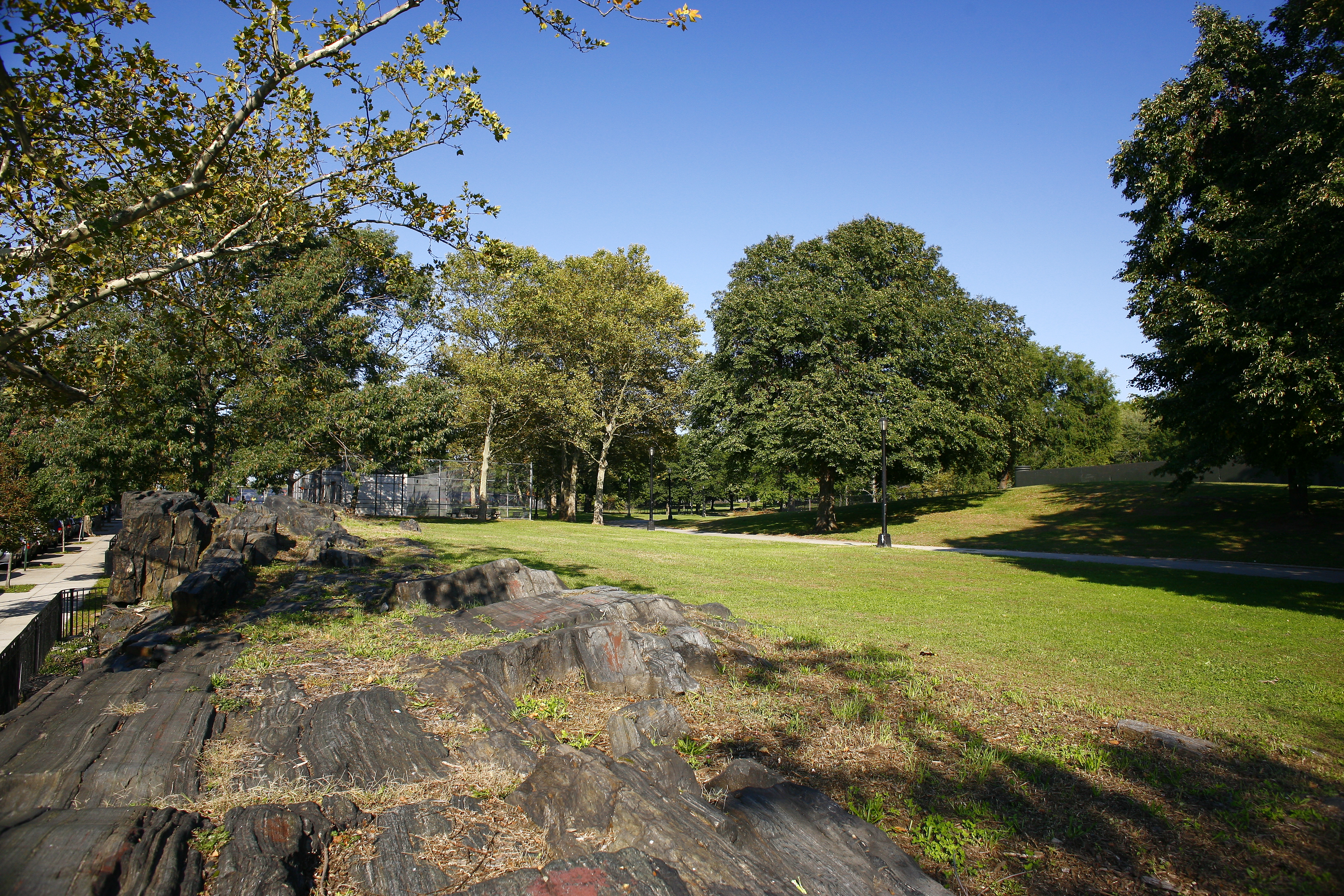
Crotona Park, one of the largest parks in the South Bronx

The geographic definitions of the South Bronx have evolved and are disputed, but certainly include the neighborhoods of Mott Haven, Melrose, and Port Morris. Originally referring to the industrial area below East 138th Street, the name "South Bronx" symbolically has had its northern boundary shift northward to East 149th Street, East 161st Street, the Cross Bronx Expressway, and Fordham Road over the years. The neighborhoods of Crotona Park East, Highbridge, Hunts Point, Longwood, Concourse, and Morrisania are sometimes considered part of the South Bronx. Generally, most consider any neighborhood west of the Bronx River and south of the Cross Bronx Expressway the South Bronx. The Cross Bronx Expressway is usually considered the dividing border between North and South Bronx. There has been debate that Fordham Road is the northern border of the South Bronx.

The South Bronx is part of New York's 14th and 15th Congressional districts. The South Bronx is served by the NYPD's 40th, 41st, 42nd, 44th, and 48th precincts.

== History ==
Building in the South Bronx built in 1909 and located on Simpson Street

The South Bronx was originally called the Manor of Morrisania, and later Morrisania. It was the private domain of the powerful and aristocratic Morris family, which includes Lewis Morris, signer of the Declaration of Independence, and Gouverneur Morris, the penman of the United States Constitution. The Morris memorial is at St. Ann's Church of Morrisania. Morris' descendants own land in the South Bronx to this day.

As the Morrises developed their landholdings, an influx of German and Irish immigrants populated the area. Later, the Bronx was considered the "Jewish Borough," and at its peak in 1930 was 49% Jewish. Jews in the South Bronx numbered 364,000 or 57.1% of the total population in the area. The term was first coined in the 1940s by a group of social workers who identified the Bronx's first pocket of poverty, in the Port Morris section, the southernmost section of the Bronx.

=== 1950s: Demographic shift ===
After World War II, as White flight accelerated and migration of ethnic and racial minorities continued, the South Bronx went from being two-thirds non-Hispanic white in 1950 to being two-thirds black or Puerto Rican in 1960. Originally denoting only Mott Haven and Melrose, the South Bronx extended up to the Cross Bronx Expressway by the 1960s, encompassing Hunts Point, Morrisania, and Highbridge.

=== 1960s: Start of decay ===
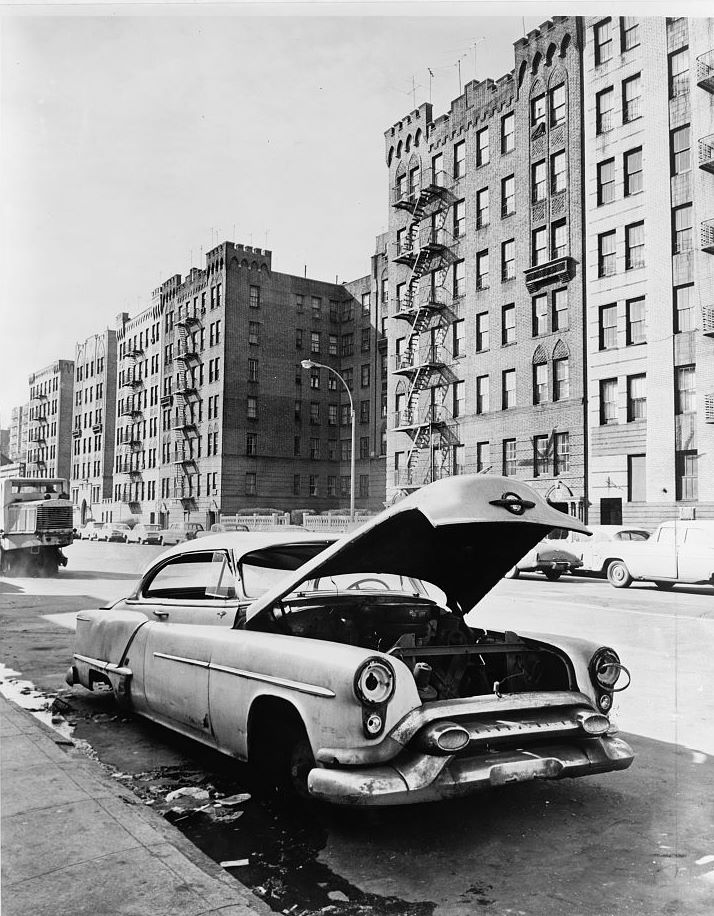
Macombs Road in Morris Heights, circa 1964

The South Bronx was populated largely by working-class families. Its image as a poverty-ridden area developed in the latter part of the 20th century. Several factors contributed to the decay of the South Bronx: White flight creating empty buildings, landlord abandonment creating unsafe buildings, economic changes leading to a lack of tax dollars, arson, demographic shifts, the reallocation of tax dollars from the South Bronx Fire Department to other places and the construction of the Cross Bronx Expressway are common reasons given.

The already poor and working-class neighborhoods were further disadvantaged by the decreasing property value, in combination with increasing vacancy rates. While some areas of the South Bronx were racially integrated as early as the 1930s, later larger scale influxes of African Americans immigrants from the American South, combined with the racially charged tension of the Civil Rights Movement, the rage following the assassination of Martin Luther King, and the dramatic rise in crime rates, further contributed to white middle-class flight and the decline of many South Bronx neighborhoods. Following the implementation of desegregation busing policies, white parents who worried about their children attending the racially integrated schools began to relocate to the suburbs, which remained predominately white due to cost as well as legal barriers created by restrictive housing covenants, and selective lending. In turn, areas of the Bronx that became predominately African American or Hispanic were considered bad risks by lenders ("redlining"), contributing to the decline in real estate values and lack of investment in the existing housing stock.

As early as the late 1960s, some neighborhoods were considered undesirable by homeowners, precipitating a population decline. Postwar rent control policies which were ostensibly to keep apartments cheap have also been proposed as a contributing factor, for the laws forced landlords to price the apartments so cheaply the landlords were unable to generate a profit and therefore there was no incentive for them to mend and repair their buildings, leading to the decay of the apartments of the South Bronx.

New York City Mayor John Lindsay (who served from 1966 to 1973) suggested that socioeconomic factors (including low educational attainment and high unemployment) limited housing options for the remaining low-income tenants, prompting the reduced upkeep by landlords. In either case, while desirable housing options were scarce, vacancies further increased. In the late 1960s, by the time the city decided to consolidate welfare households in the South Bronx, its vacancy rate was already the highest of any place in the city.

=== 1970s: "The Bronx is burning" ===
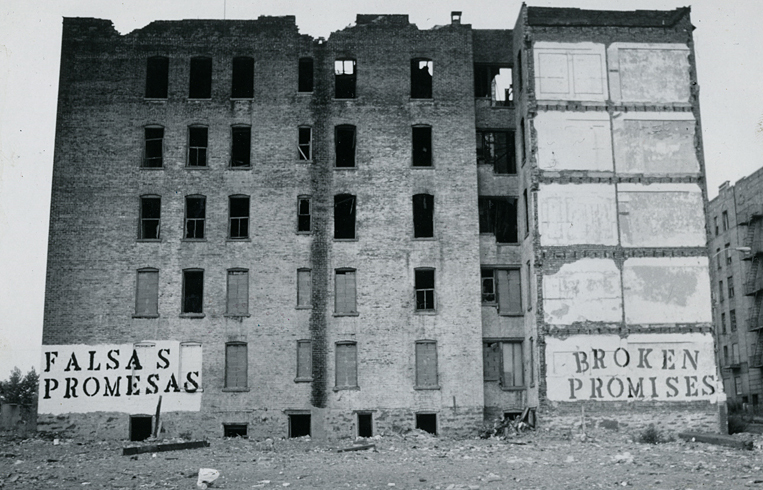
A burned-out building on Charlotte Street, 1980

By the 1970s, significant poverty reached as far north as Fordham Road. Around this time, the Bronx experienced some of its worst instances of urban decay, with the loss of 300,000 residents and the destruction of entire city blocks' worth of buildings. The media attention brought the South Bronx into common parlance nationwide.

The early 1970s saw South Bronx property values continue to plummet to record lows. A progressively vicious cycle began where large numbers of tenements and multi-story, multi-family apartment buildings, left vacant by White flight, sat abandoned and unsalable for long periods of time, which coupled with a stagnant economy and an extremely high unemployment rate made street gangs attractive to many, which were exploding in number and beginning to support themselves with large-scale drug dealing in the area. The abandoned property also attracted large numbers of squatters, who further lowered the borough's quality of living. The massive citywide spending cuts also left the few remaining building inspectors and fire marshals unable to enforce living standards or punish code violations. This encouraged slumlords and absentee landlords to neglect and ignore their property and allowed gangs to set up protected enclaves and lay claim to entire buildings. This then spread crime and fear of crime to nearby unaffected apartments in a domino effect.

As the crisis deepened, the nearly bankrupt city government of Abraham Beame placed most of the blame on unreasonably high rents levied by landlords. Beame began demanding that they convert their rapidly emptying buildings into Section 8 housing. Section 8 paid a per capita stipend for low-income or indigent tenants from Federal HUD funds rather than from the cash-strapped city bank. However, the HUD rate was not based on the property's actual value and was set so low by the city that it left little opportunity or incentive for landlords to maintain or improve their buildings while still making a profit. The result was a disastrous acceleration of both the speed and northward spread of the cycle of decay in the South Bronx as formerly desirable and well-maintained middle-to-upper class apartments in midtown, most notably along the Grand Concourse, were progressively vacated and either abandoned altogether or converted into federally funded single room occupancy "welfare hotels" run by absentee slumlords.

Police statistics show that as the crime wave moved north across the Bronx, the remaining White tenants in the South Bronx (mostly elderly Jews) were preferentially targeted for violent crime by the influx of young, minority criminals because they were seen as easy prey. This became so common that the street slang terms "crib job" (meaning how elderly residents were as helpless as infants) and "push in" (meaning what would now be called a home invasion robbery) were coined specifically in reference to them.

At this time, landlords began to burn their buildings for their insurance value, relying on "fixers" (people who specializing in a form of insurance fraud) to buy property below cost, then selling and reselling, artificially driving up the value incrementally each time. Fraudulent "no questions asked" fire insurance policies would then be taken out on the overvalued buildings and the property stripped and burned for the payoff. Flawed HUD and city policies encouraged local South Bronx residents to burn down their own buildings. Under the regulations, Section 8 tenants who were burned out of their current housing were granted immediate priority status for another apartment, potentially in a better part of the city. After the establishment of the (then) state-of-the-art Co-op City, there was a spike in fires as tenants began burning down their Section 8 housing in an attempt to jump to the front of the 2–3 year long waiting list for the new units. Often, the properties were still occupied by subsidized tenants or squatters at the time, who were given short or no warning before the building was burned down, and were forced to move to another slum building, where the process would usually repeat itself. HUD regulations also authorized lump-sum aid payments of up to $1000 to those who could prove they had lost property due to a fire in their Section 8 housing; although these payments were supposed to be investigated for fraud by a HUD employee before being signed off on, very little investigation was done and some HUD employees and social services workers were accused of turning a blind eye to suspect fires or even advising tenants on the best way to take advantage of the HUD policies. On multiple occasions, firefighters were reported to have shown up to tenement fires only to find all the residents at an address waiting calmly with their possessions already on the curb.

Firefighters in the South Bronx were also extremely strapped for resources, facing budget cuts galore amid the city's fiscal crisis, and struggled to maintain adequate staffing, equipment, and response times. Fire companies in the South Bronx, such as Engine 82 and Ladder 31, became legendary for their relentless service, often responding to dozens of alarms per day in neighborhoods plagued by poverty, unemployment, and crime.

During this period, the NYPD's 41st Precinct station house at 1086 Simpson Street became famously known as "Fort Apache, The Bronx" as it struggled to deal with the overwhelming surge of violent crime, which for the entirety of the 1970s and 1980s made South Bronx the murder, rape, robbery, aggravated assault and arson capital of America. By 1980, the 41st Precinct was renamed the "Little House on the Prairie", as fully 2/3 of the 94,000 residents originally served by the precinct had fled, leaving the fortified building as one of the few structures in the neighborhood (and the sole building on Simpson Street) that had not been abandoned or burnt out.

By the time of Cosell's 1977 commentary, dozens of buildings were being burned in the South Bronx every day, sometimes whole blocks at a time and usually far more than the fire department could keep up with, leaving the area perpetually blanketed in a pall of smoke. Firefighters from the period reported responding to as many as 7 fully involved structure fires in a single shift, too many to even bother returning to the station house between calls (Report from Engine Company 82). The local police precincts—already struggling and failing to contain the massive wave of drug and gang crime invading the Bronx—had long since stopped bothering to investigate the fires, as there were simply too many to track.

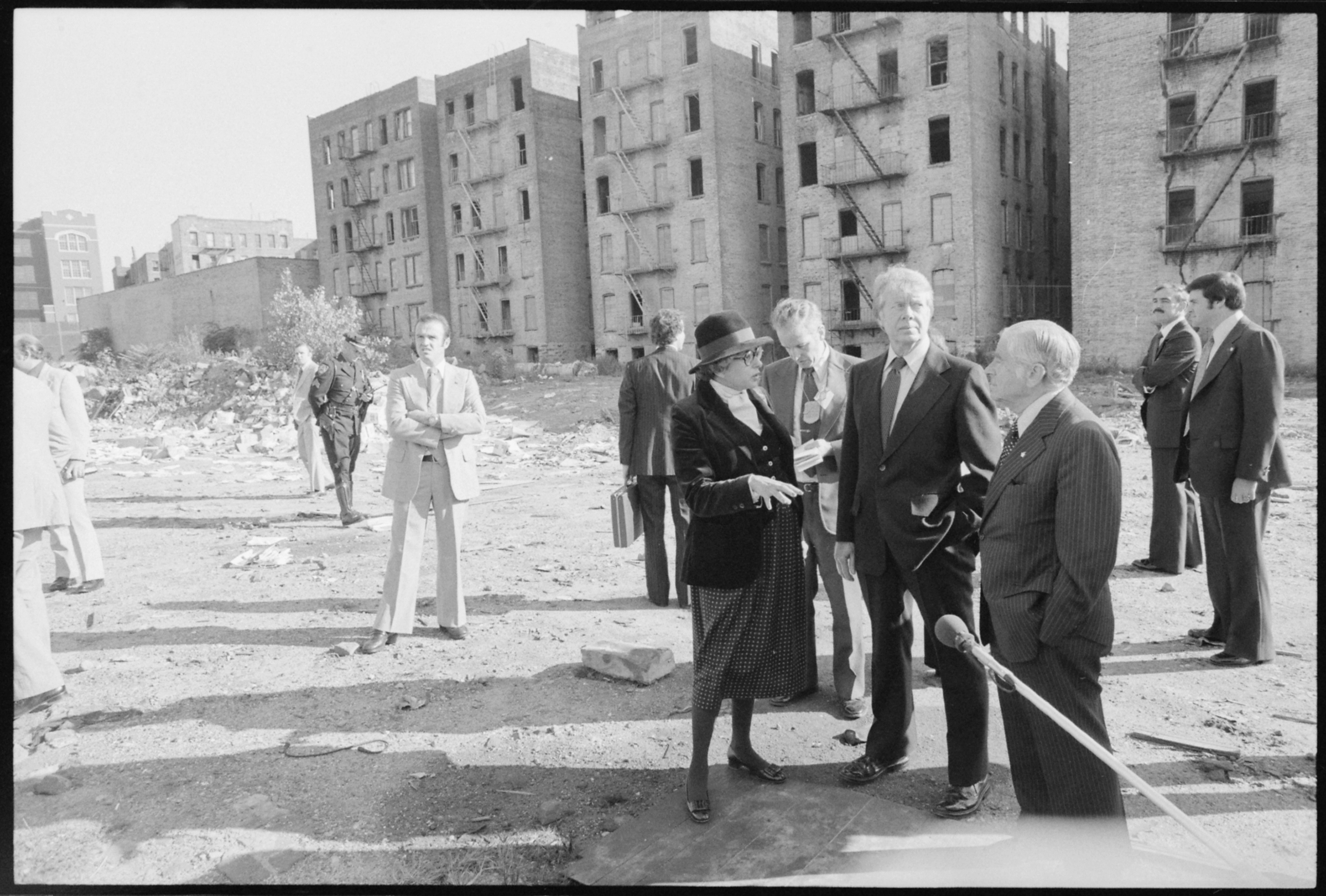
President Jimmy Carter in the South Bronx, 1977.

In total, over 80% of the South Bronx was burned or abandoned between 1970 and 1980, with 44 census tracts losing more than 50% and seven more than 97% of their buildings to arson, abandonment, or both. The appearance was frequently compared to that of a bombed-out and evacuated European city following World War II.

On October 5, 1977, U.S. President Jimmy Carter paid an unscheduled visit to Charlotte Street while in New York City for a conference at the headquarters of the United Nations. Charlotte Street at the time was a three-block devastated area of vacant lots and burned-out and abandoned buildings. The street had been so ravaged that part of it had been taken off official city maps in 1974. Carter instructed Patricia Roberts Harris, head of the U.S. Department of Housing and Urban Development, to take steps to salvage the area.

Progress did not come quickly. Three years later, in 1980, presidential candidate Ronald Reagan paid a visit to Charlotte Street, declaring that he had not "seen anything that looked like this since London after the Blitz". The 1987 novel The Bonfire of the Vanities, by the American writer Tom Wolfe, presented the South Bronx as a nightmare world, not to be entered by middle or upper-class whites.

The PBS documentary show Independent Lens released an episode titled "Decade of Fire" on May 3, 2019. The episode was previewed at the Full Frame Film Festival the previous month.

=== Revitalization and current concerns ===
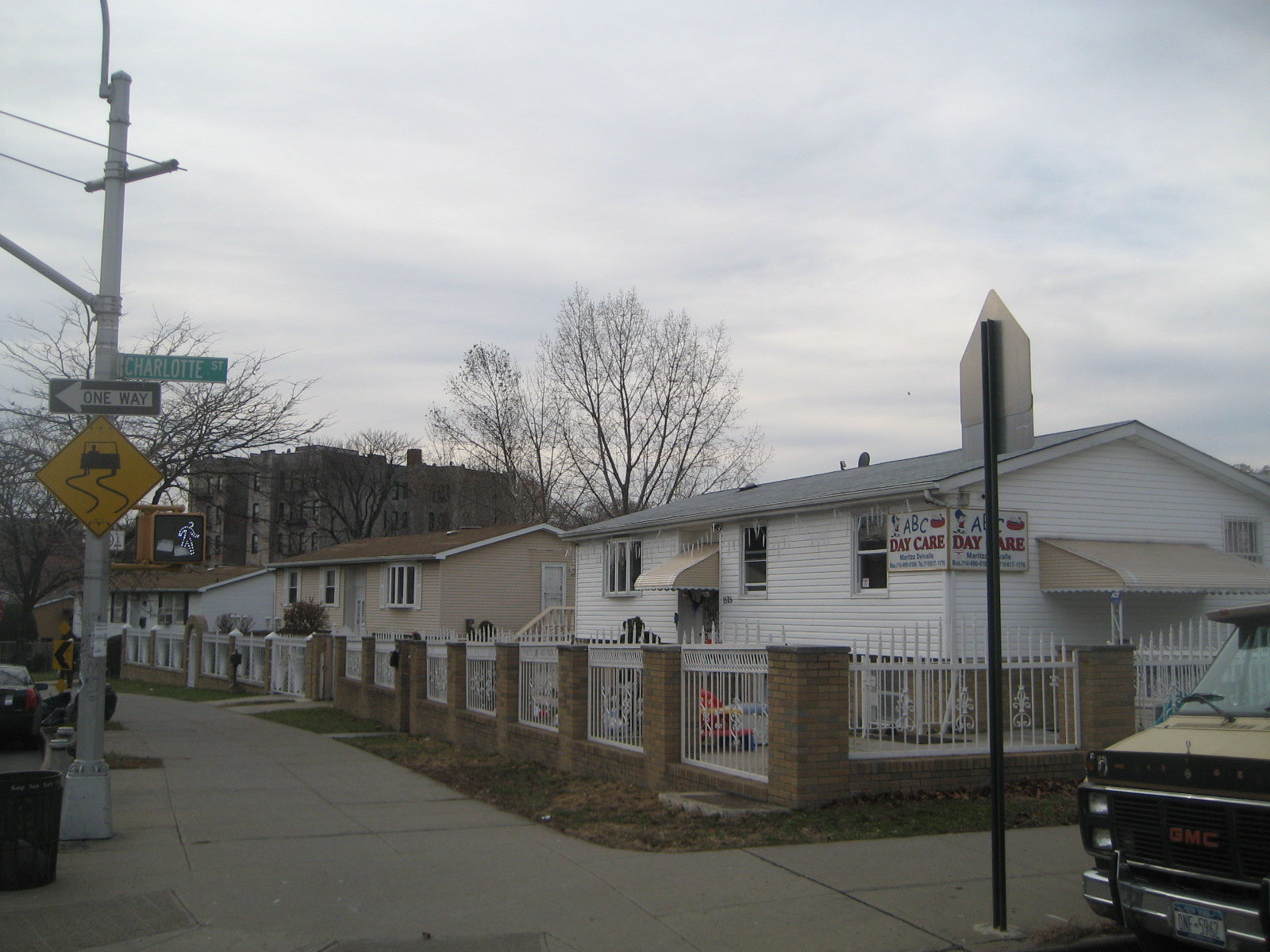
Ranch-style houses on the formerly devastated Charlotte Street, Crotona Park East

Primarily beginning in the 1980s, parts of the South Bronx started to experience urban renewal with rehabilitated and new residential structures, including subsidized multifamily townhomes and apartment buildings. Between 1986 and 1994, over $1 billion were spent on rebuilding the area, with 19,000 apartments refurbished and more than 4,500 new houses built for the working class. More than fifty abandoned apartment buildings on the Major Deegan Expressway and the Cross Bronx Expressway were renovated for residential use. Over 26,500 people moved into the area. On Charlotte Street, prefabricated ranch-style houses were built in the area in 1985, and the area changed so significantly that a Bronx borough historian (Lloyd Ultan) could not locate where Carter had stopped to survey the scene. As of 2004, houses on the street were worth up to a million dollars.

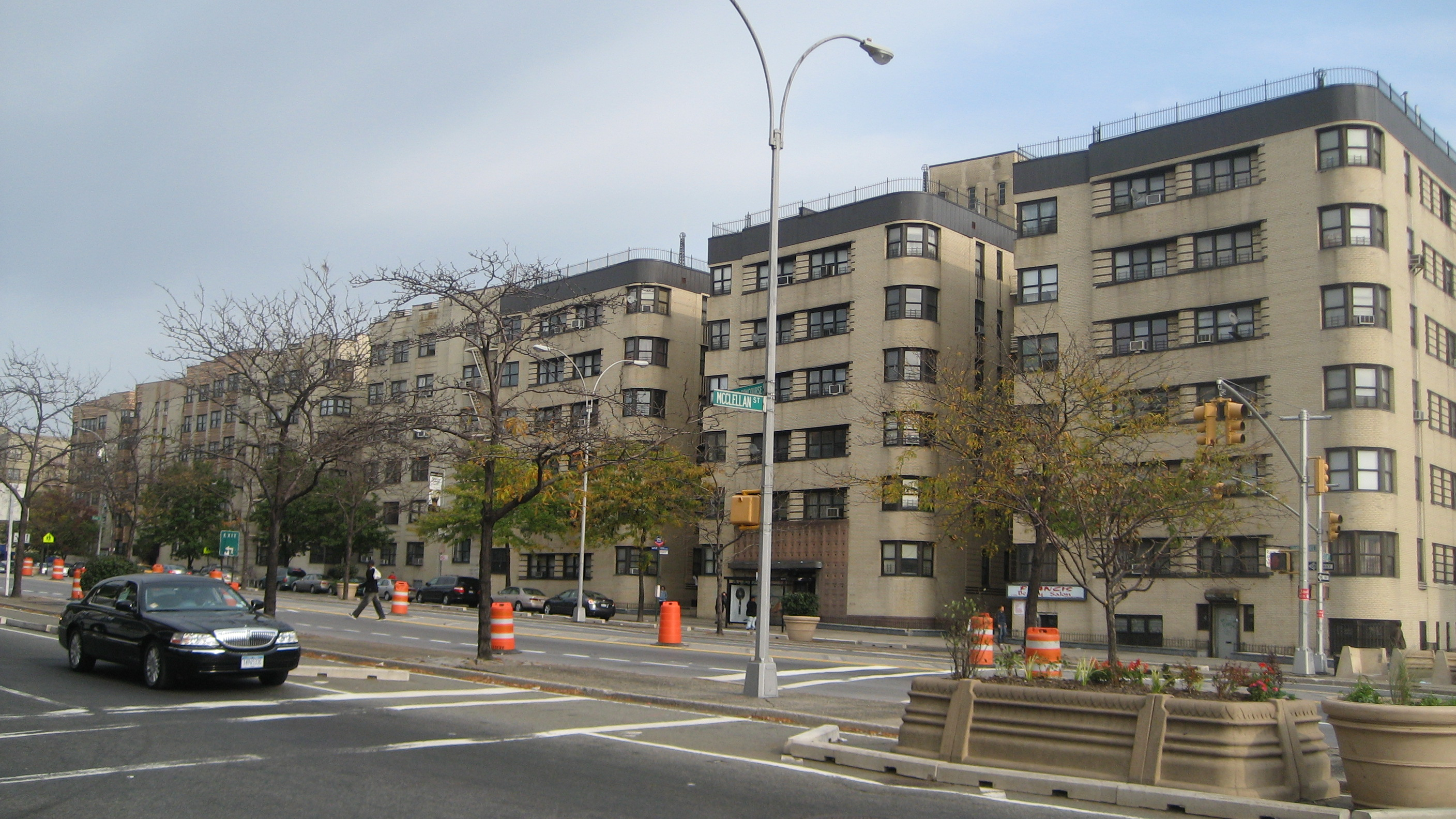
Art deco apartment buildings on the Grand Concourse, now a historic district.

The New York City Landmarks Preservation Commission (LPC) designated the Bronx County Courthouse as a city landmark on July 13, 1976. On October 25, 2011, the LPC designated a section of the corridor north of the courthouse as the Grand Concourse Historic District, citing the area's high concentration of Art Deco and Moderne residential architecture.

Construction of the new Yankee Stadium has stirred controversy over plans which, along with the new billion-dollar field, include new athletic fields, tennis courts, bicycle and walking paths, stores, restaurants, and a new Metro-North Railroad station at East 153rd Street. During baseball season, the station helps ease overcrowding on the subway.

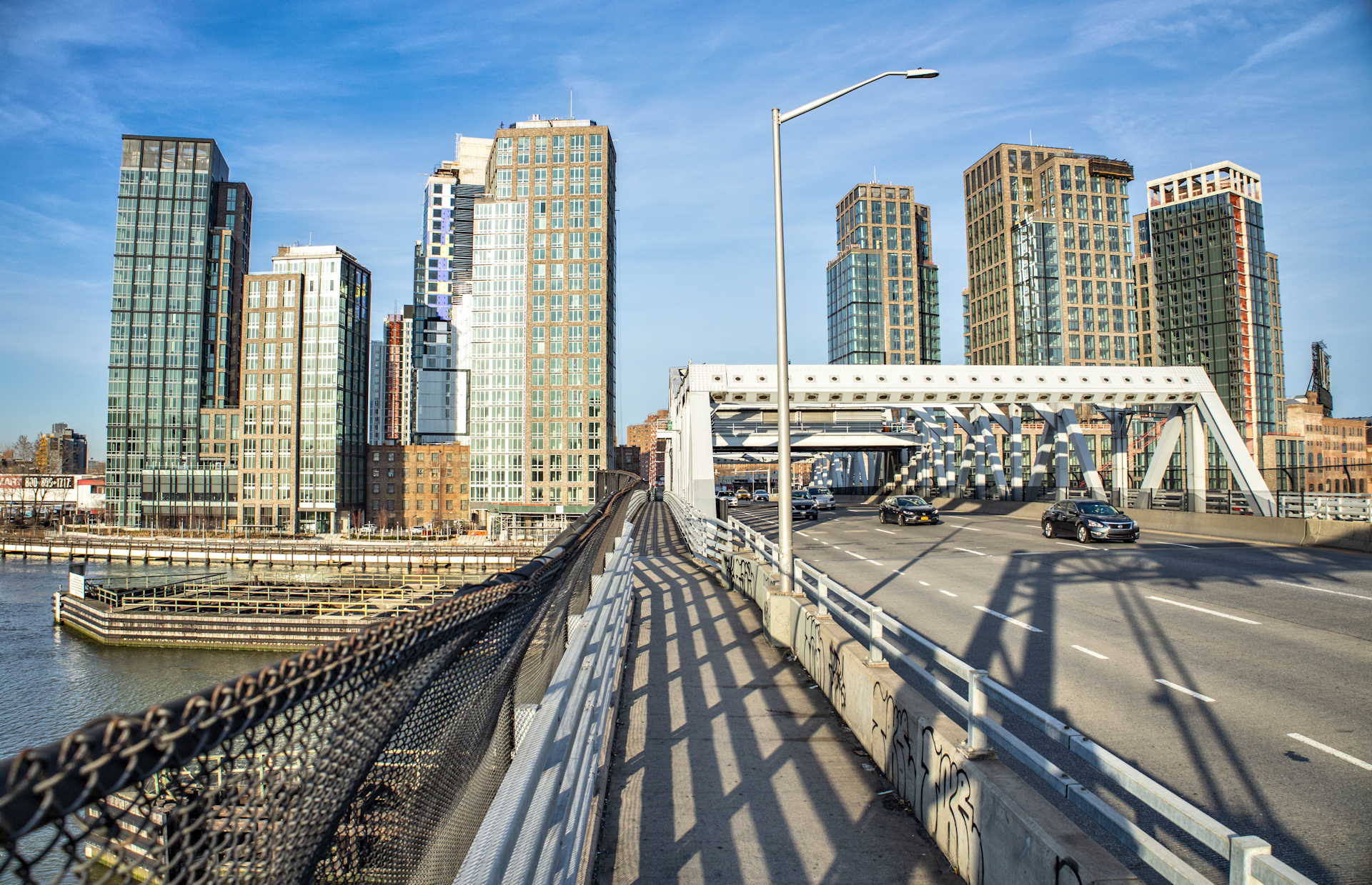
Newly built residential towers in the South Bronx's Port Morris neighborhood

There is hope that these developments also will help to generate residential construction. However, the new park came at a price: a total of 22 acres (89,000 m^{2}) in Macombs Dam and John Mullaly Parks were used to build it. In April 2012, Heritage Field, a $50.8 million ballpark, was built atop the grounds of the original Yankee Stadium. The population of the South Bronx is currently increasing.

Despite significant investment compared to the post war period, many exacerbated social problems remain, including high rates of violent crime, substance abuse, and overcrowded and substandard housing conditions. The South Bronx has also recorded its lowest homicide and crime rates since the early to mid-20th century. And there is tons of mixed income and affordable housing and luxury housing in the South Bronx. Substandard and poorly maintained housing has been blamed for disproportionately high asthma rates among children in the South Bronx. Its precincts have recorded high violent crime rates and are all considered to be New York City Police Department "impact zones." The Bronx contains the highest rate of poverty in New York City, and the greater South Bronx is the poorest Congressional district in the United States. Poverty in the public housing infrastructure has partially been caused by disinvestment by the city and state because, since the 1990s, a lack of state-funded operating subsidies to NYCHA created a $720 million shortfall by 2010 and, post 9/11, the city halted subsidies as well. The Bronx has also recently seen the opening of the Hip Hop Museum and the opening of the New Bronx Terminal Market.

== Arts and culture ==
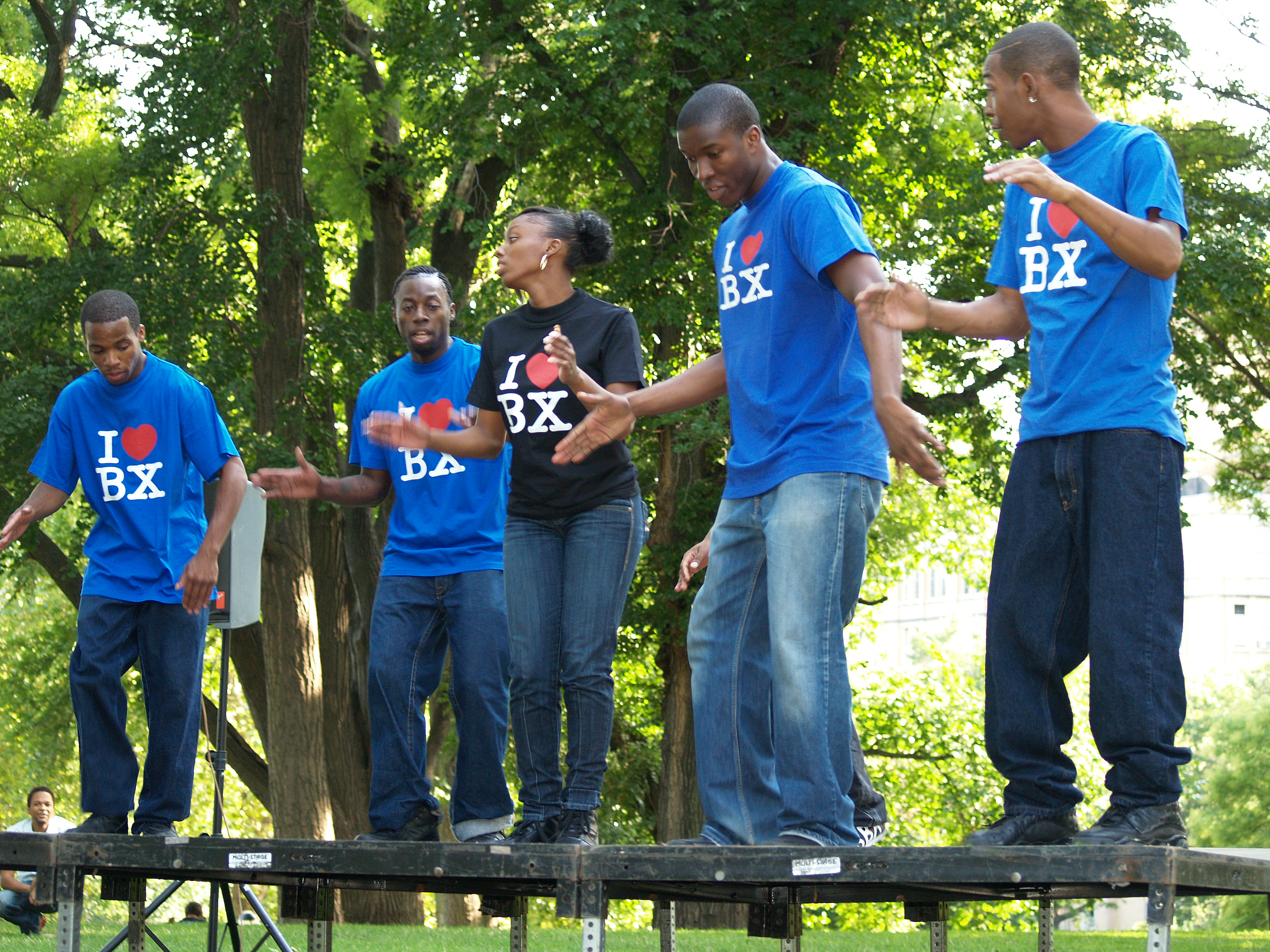
The Bronx's P.L.A.Y.E.R.S. Club Steppers performing at the 2007 Fort Greene Park Summer Literary Festival in Brooklyn

Since the late 1970s, the South Bronx has been home to a renewed grassroots art scene. The arts scene that sprouted at the Fashion Moda Gallery, founded by a Viennese artist, Stefan Eins, helped ignite the careers of artists like Keith Haring and Jenny Holzer, and 1980s break dancers like the Rock Steady Crew. It generated enough enthusiasm in the mainstream media for a short while to draw the art world's attention. The Bronx Academy of Arts and Dance was located in the American Bank Note Company Building in the South Bronx neighborhood of Hunts Point before relocating to St. Peter's Episcopal Church in Westchester Square.

Modern graffiti is prominent in the South Bronx, and is home to many of the fathers of graffiti art such as Tats Cru. The Bronx has a very strong graffiti scene despite the city's crackdown on illegal graffiti. However, graffiti in the Bronx began to occur in the early 1970s and managed to travel to different boroughs via the New York City Subway system. The rise of hip-hop music, rap, breakdancing, and disc jockeying helped put the South Bronx on the musical map in the late 1970s. The South Bronx is also known worldwide as the birthplace of hip-hop culture. In addition, the Bronx Museum of the Arts is located on the Grand Concourse.

=== Hip hop's birthplace ===
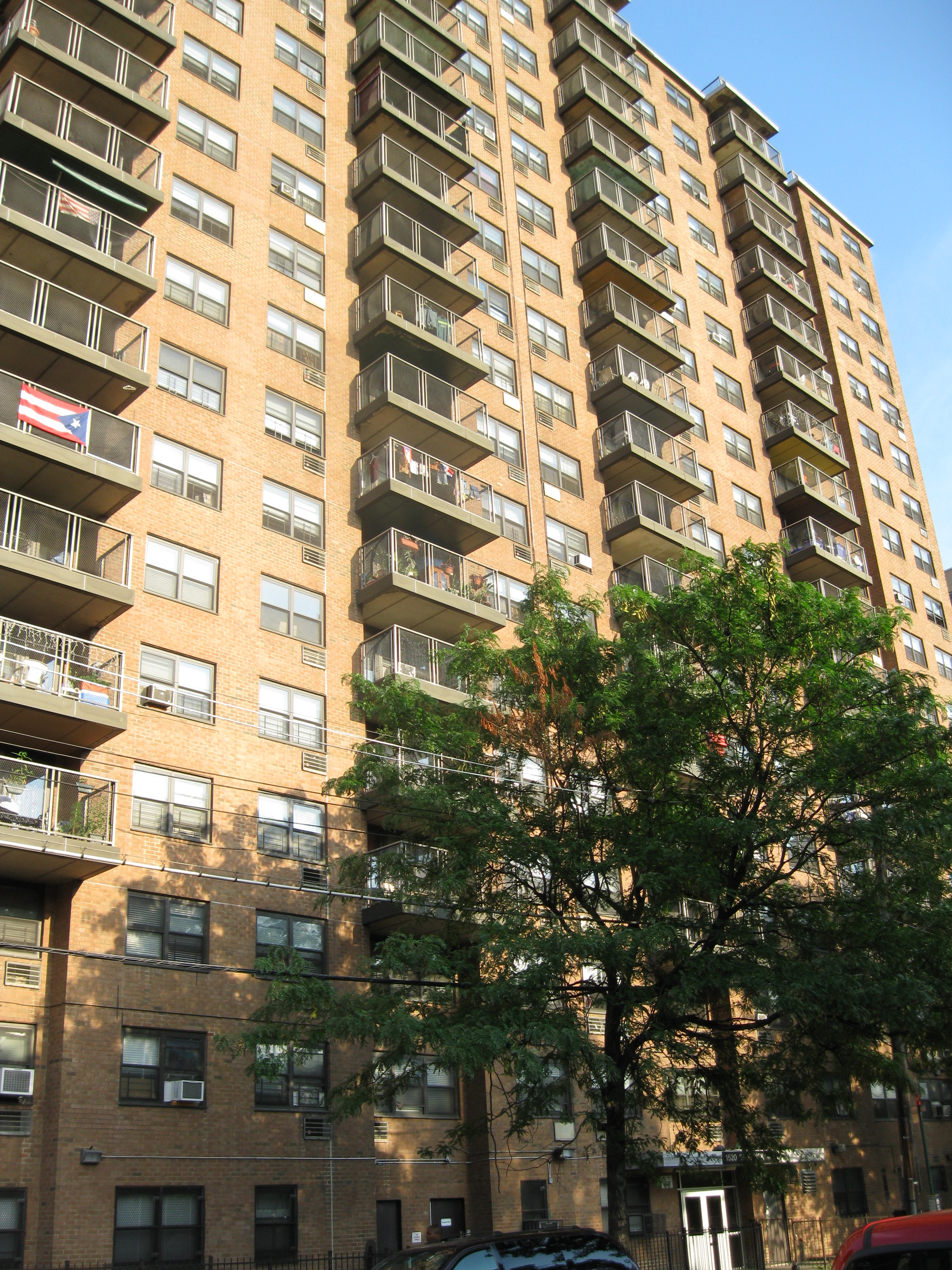
1520 Sedgwick Avenue—a longstanding "haven for working-class families" and the birthplace of hip hop."

Hip hop is a broad conglomerate of artistic forms that originated as a specific street subculture within South Bronx communities during the 1970s in New York City. Hip hop as music and culture formed during the 1970s when block parties became increasingly popular in New York City, particularly among African American and Latin Americans residing in the Bronx. Block parties incorporated DJs who played popular genres of music, especially funk and soul music. For example, many DJs played music by the artist James Brown. Some songs played at these South Bronx house parties included "Give it Up or Turn it Loose" by James Brown and "Get Ready" by Rare Earth.

Due to the positive reception, DJs began isolating the percussive breaks, or small portions of a song, often without vocals, which were easy to dance to, of popular songs. DJ Kool Herc is known for generating the technique to produce these percussive breaks, which is known as merry-go-rounding. Merry-go-rounding when DJs would "use the two turntables in a typical DJ setup not as a way to make a smooth transition between two records, but as a way to switch back and forth repeatedly between two copies of the same record."

The technique of percussive breaks was then common in Jamaican dub music, and was largely introduced into New York by immigrants from Jamaica and elsewhere in the Caribbean, including DJ Kool Herc, who is generally considered the father of hip-hop. Upon this, a technique known as Jamaican toasting, or the act of speaking over a beat which later became rapping, was introduced by DJ Kool Herc in the South Bronx at this point of time as well.

1520 Sedgwick Avenue, an apartment building in Morris Heights, is a long-time "haven for working-class families"; in 2010, The New York Times reported that it is the "accepted birthplace of hip hop." As hip-hop grew from throughout the Bronx, 1520 was a starting point where Clive Campbell, later known as DJ Kool Herc, presided over parties in the community room at a pivotal point in the genre's history. DJ Kool Herc is credited with helping to start hip hop and rap music at a house concert at 1520 Sedgwick Avenue on August 11, 1973. At the concert he was DJing and emceeing in the recreation room of 1520 Sedgwick Avenue. Sources have noted that while 1520 Sedgwick Avenue was not the actual birthplace of hip-hop—the genre developed slowly in several places in the 1970s—it was verified to be the place where one of the pivotal and formative events occurred that spurred hip hop culture forward. During a rally to save the building, DJ Kool Herc said, "1520 Sedgwick is the Bethlehem of Hip-Hop culture."

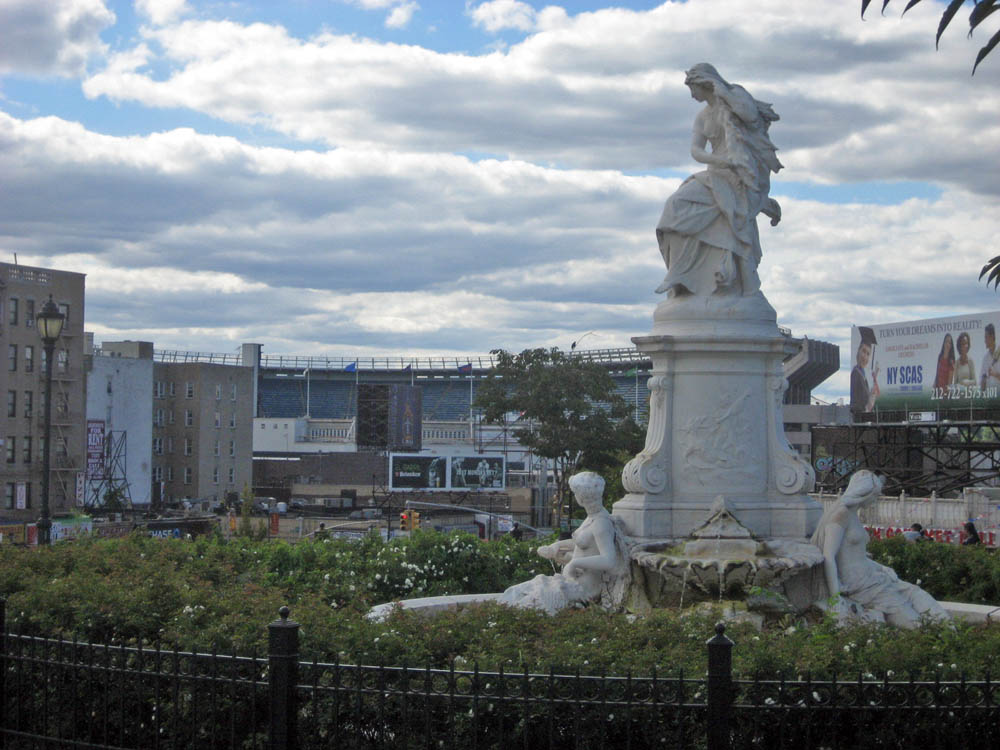
Lorelei Fountain in Joyce Kilmer Park overlooking Yankee Stadium

Many residents of the South Bronx during the early 1970s lived in poverty or were part of gangs. Afrika Bambaataa, who has been described as the godfather of hip-hop, was a member of the street gang the Black Spades. As an effort to end the street violence within the South Bronx, Bambaataa created the Zulu Nation, which is a group founded on the concepts of "Peace, Love, Unity, Having Fun" instead of partaking in gang violence and unlawful activity. In Jeff Chang's book Can't Stop Won't Stop: A History of the Hip-Hop Generation Bambaataa explained that the Zulu Nation formed because "we had to come up with something to get the order back." As seen within the film The Hip Hop Years: Part 1, hip-hop aided in keeping violence from forming on the streets of the South Bronx and eased tensions with the police within the area. People were creating art such as hip-hop music and dances at the block parties within the South Bronx, so the police did not have issues with it.

Not only was music a major component of hip-hop culture being formulated within the South Bronx during the 1970s, a break dancing or B-boying movement was being generated as well. After DJ Kool Herc and other DJs kept utilizing the break beat within their music, an abundance of people who were dancing normally, eventually hit the floor and began what is known as breakdancing. According to the documentary, The Freshest Kids: The History of the B-Boy, break dancing occurred "spontaneously" and consisted of more "sporadic" dance moves. Additionally, a Zulu king and hip-hop historian stated that the dance consisted of "bouncing around, pivoting, turning, twists frontsweeps...". Many who participated in this form of dance were members of crews, such as the Rock Steady Crew, the New York City Breakers and the Magnificent Force.

On July 5, 2007, 1520 Sedgwick Avenue was recognized by the New York State Office of Parks, Recreation and Historic Preservation as the "Birthplace of Hip-Hop."

== Education ==
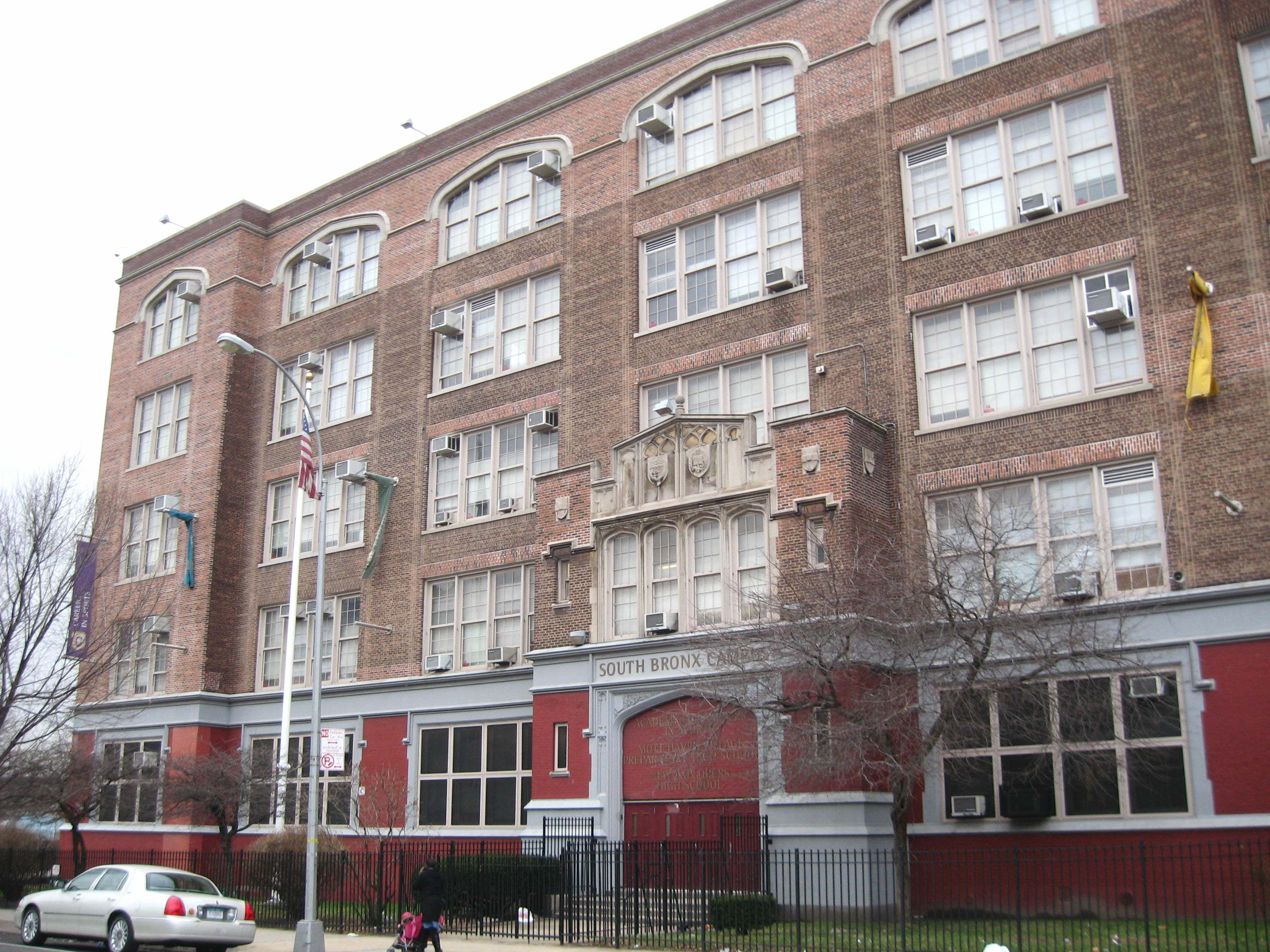
South Bronx Campus, home of Village Prep School at 701 St Ann's Avenue

The New York City Department of Education operates district public schools. Community School Districts 7, 8, 9, and 12 are located in the South Bronx. Among the public schools are charter schools. Success Academies Bronx 1, 2, and 3 are part of Success Academy Charter Schools. An elementary charter school, Academic Leadership Charter School, opened on 141st Street and Cypress Avenue. Area private schools include Cardinal Hayes High School, located at 650 Grand Concourse and All Hallows High School, located at 111 East 164th Street. Among the institutions of higher education, Hostos Community College of the City University of New York is located in Grand Concourse and 149th Street, ten blocks from Yankee Stadium.

The South Bronx is also home to both for-profit and nonprofit organizations that offer a range of professional training and other educational programs. East Side House Settlement has been in the Mott Haven neighborhood since 1963, serving families and children. Their mission is to use education as a means of economic empowerment. Per Scholas, for example, is a nonprofit organization that offers free professional certification training directed towards successfully passing CompTIA A+ and Network+ certification exams as a route to securing jobs and building careers. Per Scholas also works with a growing number of Title One South Bronx middle schools, their students, and their families to provide computer training and access.

== Transportation ==
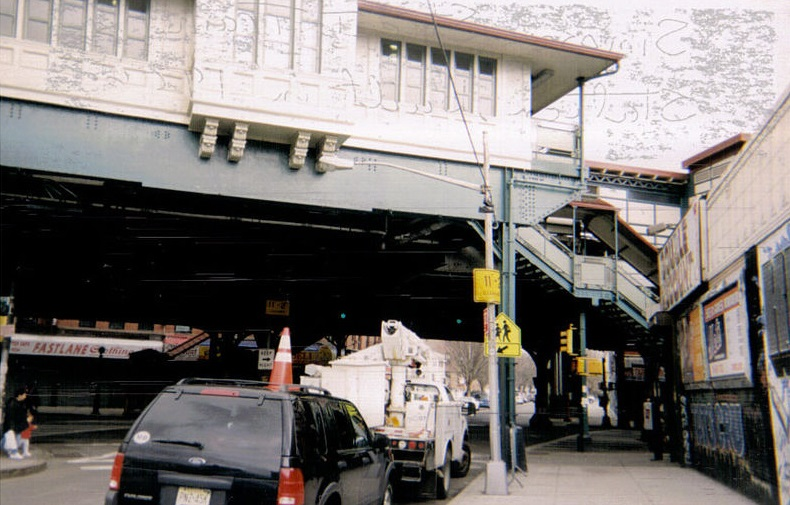
The New York City Subway's Simpson Street station, on Westchester Avenue between Simpson Street and Southern Boulevard, opened in 1904 and is listed in the National Register of Historic Places.

Major highways include the Major Deegan Expressway (I-87); Cross Bronx Expressway (I-95); Bruckner Expressway (I-278); Triborough Bridge; Grand Concourse. A variety of New York City Subway services run through the South Bronx. This includes the 6 and <6> trains on the IRT Pelham Line, 2 and 5 trains on the IRT White Plains Road Line, 4 train on the IRT Jerome Avenue Line, and B and D trains on the IND Concourse Line.

Commuter rail service exists in the form of Metro-North Railroad stations. These are Melrose and Tremont of the Harlem Line, and Yankees–East 153rd Street of the Hudson Line. As part of the Metropolitan Transit Authority's proposed Penn Station Access plan, four new stations will be built in The Bronx for the New Haven Line, one of which being Hunts Point station in the South Bronx. This allows the Metro-North Railroad to begin service to Pennsylvania Station and cut commute times to Manhattan down by 30 minutes. However, due to a dispute with Amtrak, the owner and current user of the Hell Gate Line to which the proposed Penn Station Access project would use, the project has been pushed from an original 2027 date, to a reasonable estimate of 2030. However, the Metropolitan Transportation Authority is pushing for partial service in as early as 2028.

A South Bronx Greenway currently connects the South Bronx over the Bronx Kill to Randalls Island on a bike and pedestrian pathway known as the Bronx Connector.

In 2000, 77.3% of all households in New York's 15th congressional district, covering the South Bronx, did not own automobiles. Citywide, the percentage is only 55%.

== Notable natives ==
- Danny Aiello (1933–2019), actor
- Nate Archibald (born 1948), retired professional basketball player who spent 14 years playing in the NBA and was inducted into the Naismith Memorial Basketball Hall of Fame
- Aventura, Dominican-American bachata music group
- Afrika Bambaataa (born 1957), disc jockey, singer-songwriter and producer
- Swizz Beatz (born 1978), rapper, DJ and record producer
- Jellybean Benitez (born 1957), songwriter, DJ, remixer and music producer
- Harold Bloom (1930–2019), literary critic and writer; born in the Bronx
- A Boogie wit da Hoodie, rapper; Bronx-born and from Highbridge
- Cardi B, rapper, raised in Highbridge, Bronx
- Canibus, rapper
- Majora Carter, raised in Hunts Point, current resident of Hunts Point
- Willie Colón, salsa musician; born in the Bronx
- Bobby Darin, singer, musician, actor
- Dion DiMucci & the Belmonts
- Don DeLillo, novelist; born and raised in the Bronx
- Rebel Diaz, rap group
- Rubén Díaz Jr.
- Tim Dog, rapper
- Fr. Stan Fortuna, ordained as a priest in the Bronx in 1990
- Harry Gibson
- Hank Greenberg (1911–1986), Hall of Fame baseball player
- Marcus Jansen (born 1968), urban/expressionist painter resided on Boynton Avenue near Soundview Park in the Boynton Apartments
- Bonnie Jenkins, Under Secretary of State for Arms Control and International Security Affairs
- Carlos Henriquez, jazz bassist
- DJ Kool Herc, DJ, raised in the West Bronx
- Monique Holsey-Hyman, politician, social worker, and professor
- Ralph Lauren, fashion designer; born in the Bronx
- Tom Leykis (born 1956), radio personality
- Cuban Link, rapper, born in Cuba, raised in Morrisania
- Jennifer Lopez, actress and singer; grew up in Castle Hill, Bronx
- Bernard McGuirk grew up in the South Bronx
- Drag-On, rapper, raised in Soundview
- Fat Joe, rapper, raised in Morrisania
- Grandmaster Flash, DJ, born in Barbados, raised in Morrisania
- KRS-One, rapper, originally from Brooklyn, raised in both Mott Haven and Soundview
- T La Rock, rapper
- Scott La Rock
- Remy Ma, rapper, raised in Castle Hill
- Sonia Manzano (born 1950), actress, screenwriter, author, speaker and singer-songwriter best known for her role on Sesame Street
- French Montana, rapper; moved to the South Bronx at age 13
- Richard A. Muller, physicist
- Wes Moore (born 1978), governor of Maryland, author
- Joe Negroni (1940–1978), rock and roll pioneer and founding member of the rock and roll group Frankie Lymon and the Teenagers.
- Nine, rapper
- Al Pacino, born in East Harlem, raised in the South Bronx
- Murray Perahia, concert pianist and conductor
- Colin Powell, raised in Longwood
- Big Pun, rapper, was born and raised in Soundview.
- Richard Price, novelist and screenwriter
- Alex Ramos, professional boxer
- Charles Nelson Reilly (1931–2007), actor, comedian, director and drama teacher
- Hell Rell, rapper raised in Tremont
- Neil Raymond Ricco, poet and writer
- Bobby Sanabria (born 1957), Multi-Grammy nominated Latin and jazz drummer, percussionist, composer, arranger, educator, bandleader
- Herman Santiago, rock and roll pioneer and songwriter who was previously a member of the vocal group Frankie Lymon and the Teenagers. He (disputedly) co-wrote the group's iconic hit "Why Do Fools Fall in Love".
- Tony Santiago, better known as "Tony the Marine" is a United States Marine veteran, writer, and military historian.
- Dolph Schayes, 12x All Star basketball player
- Richie Scheinblum (1942–2021), Major League Baseball All-Star outfielder
- Sonia Sotomayor (born 1954), Associate Justice of the Supreme Court of the United States
- Tony Sunshine, R&B singer, raised in Soundview
- Leonard Susskind, theoretical physicist; born in the Bronx
- Neil deGrasse Tyson, astrophysicist and science communicator; born in the Bronx
- Kemba Walker, NBA player; born and raised in Soundview, Bronx
- Kerry Washington, actress; Bronx-born / Bronx roots
- Steven Weinberg (1933–2021), theoretical physicist
- Barry Wellman (born 1942), sociologist
- 645AR, rapper, born and raised partly in the region and attended Hostos Community College

== In popular culture ==
=== Film and television ===
==== Set in or prominently depicting the South Bronx ====
- Beat Street (1984)
- Fort Apache, The Bronx (1981)
- Wolfen (1981)
- Wild Style (1983)
- Style Wars (1983, documentary)
- The Police Tapes (1977, documentary)
- Hangin' with the Homeboys (1991)
- Tenement (also released as Slaughter in the South Bronx) (1985)
- From Mambo to Hip Hop: A South Bronx Tale (2006, documentary)
- The Get Down, 2016– Netflix series

==== Set in the Bronx (not specific to the South Bronx) ====
- The Wanderers (1979)
- Gloria (1980)
- 1990: The Bronx Warriors (1982)
- Rumble in the Bronx (1995)
- Marty (1955)

=== Music ===
- "South Bronx" by Boogie Down Productions
- "Jenny from the Block" by Jennifer Lopez featuring Styles P & Jadakiss

=== Literature ===
- Dropsie Avenue (1995), by Will Eisner. Dropsie Avenue is the third story in the A Contract With God trilogy of graphic novels set in a fictional South Bronx neighborhood.
- Amazing Grace: The Lives of Children and the Conscience of a Nation (1995), by Jonathan Kozol. Awarded the Anisfield-Wolf Book Award in 1996.

== See also ==
- 80 Blocks from Tiffany's
