= A Life Force =

American graphic novel

- Date: 1988
- Series: The Contract with God Trilogy

Creative team
- Creator: Will Eisner

Chronology
- Preceded by: A Contract with God (1978)
- Followed by: Dropsie Avenue (1995)

A Life Force is a 1988 graphic novel by American cartoonist Will Eisner. It is the second book in the Contract with God trilogy, preceded by A Contract with God (1978) and followed by Dropsie Avenue (1995). Like the other titles, it is set in New York City, taking place in the 1930s.

== Synopsis ==
In 1934, during the Great Depression, elderly carpenter Jacob Shtarkah is let go from a synagogue after spending five years building a study hall for them, with no other projects and a larger donor having it named after them. Jacob, walking home through the streets bemoaning how he wants work as a reason for living, has a heart attack in the alley below his apartment at 55 Dropsie Avenue, and philosophizes on the nature of reasons for living before stopping a passerby from stepping on a cockroach, which his wife Rifka had inadvertently thrown out into the alley while cleaning, before heading home for dinner. Despite standing in line for work at the carpenter’s union hall and signing up to shovel snow, he has no work. Eventually, Jacob is hired by Rabbi Bensohn on the top floor of their building to build an extra room for his senile wife Beckeleh to stay safe in.

In the late winter of 1933, Elton Shaftsbury, socialite and heir to a New England factory, has lost everything in the crash of 1929 and is selling apples on street corners. By 1934, his home in Scarsdale is foreclosed and he ends up living in the tenement building in the Bronx. He considers suicide, but Rifka and her daughter, Rebecca, offer him a job as a “shabbas goy” to turn on their apartment lights and stove on the Sabbath. He accepts, and soon finds a job as a runner for a brokerage firm on Wall Street. That night, returning home, Rebecca offers to take him skating the next day to celebrate, despite Rifka’s objections. At the park, the two begin to fall for each other.

Meanwhile, Moustache Pete, a local Black Hand gangster, intends to have Elton jumped to steal his bonds. He extorts Angelo, a carpenter and illegal immigrant who owes the Black Hand for passage into the country and who lives at the tenement, into becoming friendly with Elton to find out whenever he returns home with the bag of bonds. Angelo and his wife Marie panic about possibly going to jail for helping robbery, when Jacob arrives to ask Angelo for help in building the room for Beckeleh, due to Jacob’s health, which Angelo accepts.

Aaron, a young man with a mental illness, suffering from hallucinations and paranoia, lives alone in the tenement, provided for by a distant relative. One night, after yelling at God, Aaron wakes up the next morning with his paranoia and hallucinations somehow gone. He heads out into the city. Meanwhile, Moustache Pete has Marie tell him where Elton works (due to Angelo paying back the society), and has his henchman Lupo wait by the tenement to hold the runner up for his bonds. While waiting, however, Aaron begins to annoy Lupo, who starts to fight him, but ends up accidentally shooting himself while Aaron runs back to his apartment in horror, right before Elton comes back to the tenement for lunch.

Willie and Ben, two high schoolers who have gotten into communism, attend a meeting where a Moscow delegate, Mr. Vostrov, tells them that for an upcoming demonstration to have girls pushing baby carriages at the front and while other agitators will throw rocks at the police to force a fight, despite hesitation from some in the meeting. At the same time, Willie’s father Morris has his fur shop visited by union toughs, who hit his foreman Max in the head when they refuse to let the shop organize. The injury gives Max a concussion and brain damage, and at his home Morris angrily blasts communists. Finding Willie and Ben making signs in another room, he orders them out. Ben tells a hesitant Willie to make a decision to go with him or stay with his parents. Willie stays home.

Jacob and Angelo work on planning out the room, but find with the coast they may have to buy materials on credit. Angelo gets an idea to buy from a local lumber yard he had bought from before, but they learn from the owner that it is out of business and owned by his bank. Meanwhile, Elton is sitting on the stoop, depressed from not being able to marry Rebecca on his salary as well as her parents not approving of him being Gentile. Jacob and Elton discuss their problems, and Elton offers to talk to his brokerage firm to help. He talks his boss into buying the lumber yard from its bank to invest in it and eventually take it public. He is promoted in the firm, and buys Jacob and Angelo control of the lumber yard, with stock held by the firm.

Jacob receives a letter via Rabbi Bensohn from the daughter of Frieda Gold, who he knew in Germany and almost married when they were younger, asking to help Frieda reach the States to escape the violence of the Nazis. After some correspondence, Elton uses some connections to help bring Frieda over, but Jacob finds out that he would pledge assets and take care of her, while also having to add her daughter and son-in-law as the violin grows. However, the papers are improperly filed by staffers not wanting to redo it, and Frieda’s son in law is arrested for performing an illegal abortion while her daughter escapes. Jacob is convinced by Angelo to use Pete’s help to get Frieda over. Meanwhile, he hides this information from Rifka, unsure how to even explain it.

Frieda arrives in New York by boat, and gets lodging with help from Jacob and Angelo in a tenement a block away, while giving her a job bookkeeping at the lumber yard. In her apartment, the two discuss their lives, with Jacob wanting to rekindle their flame while Frieda feels they cannot go back to the past. Angelo tells Jacob to come to the lumber yard, where Pete offers them discounted lumber, claiming to be now be involved in shipping. Jacob reluctantly agrees. By 1935, the firm, seeing the yard’s soaring profits, decide on taking it public, a proposition which would make Angelo and Jacob rich from their share ownership. However, when Elton tells Jacob that he is planning to marry Rebecca, Jacob experiences chest pains, and warns Elton that there may be trouble due to the growing anti-semitism around the world.

At the lumber yard, Jacob is saddened by the news, while Frieda notes that her son-in-law was not Jewish, with Jacob aware they will marry anyway but it may devastate Rifka. Later on, a kid, Yussie, playing around in the lumber yard discovers a dead body and rushes to 55 Dropsie to tell Willie, but is ignored. Willie argues with his father about going to a camp for the summer versus delivering coats. Outside, Elton and Rebecca see Yussie, who tells them about the body At the lumber yard, it is gone, but Yussie finds the man’s clothes in a wash can, while Elton finds a box from Pete’s distribution company. At the company, one of Pete’s goons tells him the dead body was someone snooping around their truck and accidentally delivered with the lumber, who he went back to dispose of in the river.

The next day at the lumber yard, Elton visits Jacob, and gets Pete’s address. Jacob closes up early, walking Frieda home, discussing the meaning to their lives. At Frieda’s apartment, Jacob vents his frustrations at his unhappy marriage with Rifka and his children (Rebecca and Danny, a doctor) marrying non-Jews, and proposes romance with Frieda, who again refuses. Meanwhile, Elton tracks down the distribution company, and upon seeing a truck from an unassociated mill being unloaded, realizes they are hijackers. He returns to the firm to tell his boss, but the stock has already been sold and he is promoted to a partner at the firm, while Elton worries about what will happen to the lumber yard. That night, Rebecca tells Elton she is pregnant, and the two decide to marry.

Willie is sent with Max, now heavily brain-damaged, on a delivery for his father’s shop. While Willie unloads suits, Max sees one of Pete’s goons, Gino, roughing up an informant, who tells him that the dead body was a federal agent, with his badge in his pocket found when stripped. Gino heads to the lumber yard to find the clothes and the badge, but Max, recognizing him as the thug who hit him in the head, follows him. At 55 Dropsie, Rifka is horrified as Jacob asks her for a divorce, who simply tells her, Rebecca and Elton that it was not her fault but with the children grown up, he wants something more in life, not wanting to be a “cockroach.”

At the lumber yard, Angelo is working after hours when Gino, who roughs him up asking about the location of the dead man’s clothes (unaware that earlier, a local had gone through the trash can to find clothes to sell for cheap), fighting him and knocking over a space heater in the process, setting the building ablaze. Angelo is left for dead while Gino searches the yard, but Max rescues him before going back in to fight Gino. The two are caught in the fire, while Angelo wakes up and calls the police.

At Freida’s apartment, Jacob arrives and is happy to be tighter, while Frieda worries about Rifka and the that everything is happening so fast from what she just got away from in Germany, but Jacob assures her that they’ve been given a second chance and they can enjoy the day to day. After having sex, however, they are informed by the police that the lumber yard has burned down. Angelo and Jacob are devastated seeing the ruins and head home, where Willie, unaware of all that happened, apologizes for Max burning down the yard, while Angelo does not want to say anything about the heater. In the apartment, Elton tells the two that the police report has the fire as accidental, so the insurance will pay out enough for them to rebuild the yard and can invest to grow it, while any evidence of their buying Pete’s hijacked lumber were destroyed, so they will not go to jail.

Elton also announces that he and Rebecca were married at the city hall the previous day. Jacob feels dizzy and sits down, and asks where Rifka is. Danny appears, telling him she is in another room as the news gave her a mild heart attack, and with rest and care will be okay. Everyone else leaves as Jacob stays in the apartment, when Rabbi Bensohn enters with soup for Rifka and a letter from the Jewish Agency stating that Frieda’s daughter is in Jerusalem, ill and needing financial support from her mother. After Bensohn leaves, Rifka wakes up and Jacob gives her the soup, before briefly talking about how he came back, with Rifka going back to sleep stating that there was not another woman.

At Frieda’s apartment, Jacob gives her the letter. Frieda decides she must leave the country to be with her daughter right away, but she is going alone after Jacob wants to go. Jacob is heartbroken, feeling his dream is over, but Frieda tells him that he still can, and can write to her in a year’s time, if her daughter is well, and maybe they can talk about a future for them. Jacob walks back home, and is told to rest by Rifka as she tells him to tell the super to call an exterminator for the cockroaches. As she tells him to meet with Angelo at the lumber yard for the rebuilding, Jacob picks up a cockroach and drops it into the alley, where it scurries off.

== Background ==
Eisner, in an introduction to the Contract With God trilogy, would state that the genesis of the book came after his 65th birthday, finding himself increasingly preoccupied with the subject and decided to face it head on with a graphic novel. The character of Jacob Shtarkah was based on himself, in the same manner as Willie in the novel and the counterpart in A Contract With God, and the events that occur in the story were drawn from neighborhood stories when he was moving between brought as a child.
