= Dropsie Avenue =

1985 graphic novel by Will Eisner

- Date: 1995
- Series: The Contract with God Trilogy

Creative team
- Creator: Will Eisner

Chronology
- Preceded by: A Life Force (1988)

Dropsie Avenue is a 1995 graphic novel by American cartoonist Will Eisner. After A Contract with God (1978) and A Life Force (1988), it is the third volume in the Contract with God trilogy.

== Plot ==
There is an overarching plot but no clear single arc except that of the life-cycle of a neighbourhood, its deterioration and renewal. In the form of chronicles, most tales only last few pages, however there are multiple core characters whose stories are spread throughout. The chronicles tell about life, problems, and solutions about inter-ethnic and other socioeconomic relations of residents of Dropsie Avenue in New York City. One common plot revolves around 'old' residents bemoaning the arrival of 'newer' residents and frictions caused by it.

== Publication ==
Kitchen Sink Press published the book in 1995 as the third volume of the Contract with God trilogy. DC Comics bought the rights to reprint the book and Eisner's other works in 1999 and reprinted Dropsie Avenue as part of its Will Eisner Library in 2000. W. W. Norton then acquired Eisner's catalogue and released A Contract with God, A Life Force, and Dropsie Avenue in a single-volume edition in 2006, and in 2007 released the three books in standalone editions.
