= A Contract with God =

Graphic novel by Will Eisner

- First trade paperback edition, Baronet Books, 1978
- Creator: Will Eisner
- Date: 1978
- Series: The Contract with God Trilogy
- Page count: 196 pages

Chronology
- Followed by: A Life Force (1988)

A Contract with God and Other Tenement Stories, often referred to simply as A Contract with God, is a graphic novel written and illustrated by American cartoonist Will Eisner and published in 1978. The book's short story cycle revolves around poverty-stricken Jewish characters who live in a tenement in New York City. Eisner produced two sequels set in the same tenement: A Life Force in 1988, and Dropsie Avenue in 1995. The term "graphic novel" originated in 1964, but A Contract with God is credited with initiating its widespread use.

Four stand-alone stories make up the book: in "A Contract with God", a religious man gives up his faith after the death of his young adopted daughter; in "The Street Singer", a has-been diva tries to seduce a poor, young street singer, who tries to take advantage of her in turn; an antisemitic tenement manager commits suicide after accusations of pedophilia in "The Super"; and "Cookalein" intertwines the stories of several characters vacationing in the Catskill Mountains. The stories are thematically linked with motifs of frustration, disillusionment, violence, and issues of ethnic identity. Eisner uses large, monochromatic images in dramatic perspective and emphasizes the caricatured characters' facial expressions; few panels or captions have traditional borders around them.

Eisner began his comic book career in 1936 and had long held artistic ambitions for what was perceived as a lowbrow medium. He found no support for his ideas, and left the world of commercial comics after ending his signature work The Spirit in 1952. The growth of comics fandom convinced him to return in the 1970s, and he worked to realize his aspirations of creating comics with literary content. He desired a mainstream publisher for the book and to have it sold in traditional bookstores, rather than in comic book shops; the small press Baronet Books released A Contract with God in 1978 and marketed it as a "graphic novel", which thereafter became the common term for book-length comics. It sold slowly at first but gained respect from Eisner's peers, and it has since been reprinted by larger publishers. A Contract with God cemented Eisner's reputation as an elder statesman of comics, and he continued to produce graphic novels and theoretical works on comics until his death in 2005.

== Content and plot summaries ==
A Contract with God mixes melodrama with social realism. Following an author's introduction, "A Tenement in the Bronx", the book contains four stories set in a tenement building; they derive in part from Eisner's personal memories growing up in a tenement in the Bronx. With A Contract with God he aimed to explore an area of Jewish-American history that he felt was underdocumented, while showing that comics was capable of mature literary expression, at a time when it received little such regard as an artistic medium. In the preface he stated his aim to keep the exaggeration in his cartooning within realistic limits.

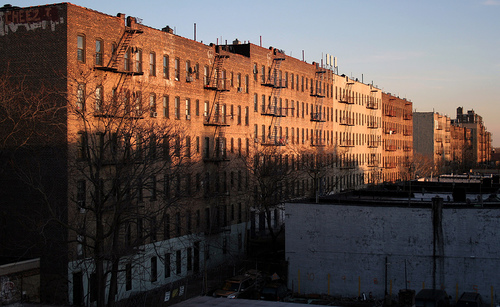
Stories derive from Will Eisner's memories of his childhood in tenement buildings in the Bronx.

The story "A Contract with God" drew from Eisner's feelings over the death of his daughter, Alice, at sixteen years old. In his introduction to the 2006 edition of the book, Eisner first wrote about it and the feelings he felt toward God that were reflected in the story. "The Street Singer" and "The Super" are fiction, but sprang from Eisner's memories of people he had met in the tenements of his youth. "Cookalein" was the most autobiographical—the main character "Willie" even carries Eisner's own boyhood nickname. Eisner remarked that "it took a lot of determination, a kind of courage, to write that story".

The stories' sexual content is prominent, though not in the gratuitous manner of underground comix' celebration of hedonism, which contrasted with the conservative lifestyle of Eisner the middle-aged businessman. Eisner used no profanity in the book, and according to critic Josh Lambert the sex in Contract is not so much erotic as disturbing, the characters frustrated or filled with guilt.

=== "A Contract with God" ===
In Russia, the young, deeply religious Hasidic Jew Frimme Hersh (Note: According to academic Harry Brod, the name "Frimme" is derived from the Yiddish "frum", or "pious".) carves a contract with God on a stone tablet to live a life of good deeds; he attributes to it his later success in life. He moves to New York, into a tenement building at 55 Dropsie Avenue, and lives a simple life devoted to God. He adopts an infant girl, Rachele, who is abandoned on his doorstep. When she dies of a sudden illness, Hersh is infuriated, and accuses God of violating their contract. He abandons his faith, shaves his beard, and lives a life as a miserly businessman in a penthouse with a gentile mistress. He illicitly uses a synagogue's bonds that were entrusted to him to buy the tenement building in which he had lived when poor. He becomes dissatisfied with his new way of life, and decides that he needs a new contract with God to fill the emptiness he feels. He has a group of rabbis draw up a new contract, but when he returns home with it, his heart fails and he dies. A boy, Shloime, finds Hersh's old contract, and signs his own name to it. Eisner appended a page to the 2006 edition, depicting Shloime ascending the stairs to the tenement.

Eisner called the story's creation "an exercise in personal anguish" as he was still grieved and angered over his daughter Alice's death from leukemia at 16. In early sketches of the story, Eisner used her name for Hersh's adopted daughter, and expressed his own anguish through Hersh. He stated, "[Hersh's] argument with God was mine. I exorcised my rage at a deity that I believed violated my faith and deprived my lovely 16-year-old child of her life at the very flowering of it".

=== "The Street Singer" ===
Marta Maria, an aging opera singer, seduces a young man, Eddie, whom she finds singing in the alleys between tenement buildings. She had given up her own singing career for an alcoholic husband; she hopes to get back into show business as mentor to Eddie, and gives him money for clothes. He buys whiskey instead and returns to his pregnant wife, who herself had given up on show business for him and whom he abuses. He hopes to take advantage of Maria and build an actual singing career, but is unable to find the aging diva again—he does not know her address, and the tenement buildings appear all the same to him.

Eisner based the story on memories of an unemployed man who made the rounds of tenements singing "popular songs or off-key operatic operas" for spare change. Eisner remembered throwing the street singer coins on occasion, and considered he "was able to immortalize his story" in "The Street Singer".

=== "The Super" ===
Those who live in the tenement at 55 Dropsie Avenue fear and mistrust their antisemitic superintendent, Mr. Scuggs. The tenant Mrs. Farfell's young niece Rosie goes down to his apartment and offers him a peek at her panties for a nickel. After receiving the nickel she poisons Scuggs' dog and only companion, Hugo, and steals Scuggs's money. He corners her in an alley, where the tenants spot him and call the police, accusing him of trying to molest a minor. Before the police can break into his apartment to arrest him, he shoots himself, embracing Hugo's body.

Eisner wrote that he based the superintendent on the "mysterious but threatening custodian" of his boyhood tenement. Eisner added a page to the 2006 edition in which a "Super Wanted" sign is posted on the tenement building, following the original conclusion of Rosie counting her stolen money.

=== "Cookalein" ===
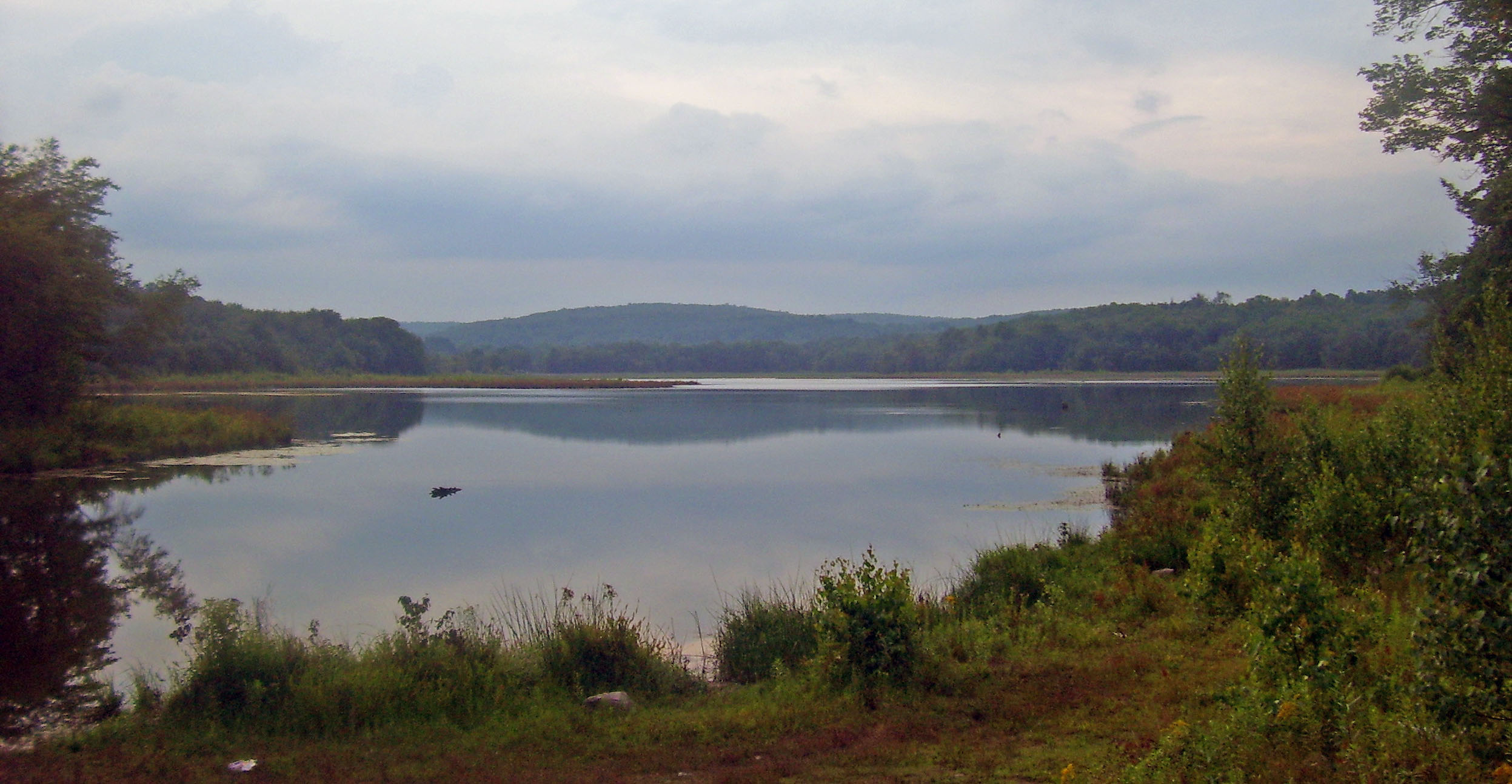
Silver Lake, Woodridge, New York, a lake in the Catskill Mountains

"Cookalein" is a story of tenants of 55 Dropsie Avenue vacationing in the country. To be alone with his mistress, a man named Sam sends his wife and children away to the Catskill Mountains, where they stay at a "cookalein" (Yiddish: kochalayn, "cook alone", a place for boarders with access to a kitchen).

A clothing cutter named Benny and a secretary named Goldie are staying at an expensive hotel near the cookalein, both hoping to find someone rich to marry; they mistake each other for a wealthy target, and when they discover this, Benny rapes Goldie. Herbie, an intern Goldie had earlier turned down, takes her into his care, and Benny goes on to court an heiress. An older woman seduces Sam's fifteen-year-old son Willie at the cookalein; they are discovered by her husband who, after beating her, makes love to her in front of the boy.

At the end of the summer, the vacationers return to Dropsie Avenue. Goldie and Herbie are engaged, and Benny believes he will be marrying into the diamond business. Willie is affected by his experiences, but does not express them, and his family plan to leave the tenement. For the 2006 edition Eisner added an extra page of Willie from a rear-view perspective, looking out from his balcony.

"Cookalein" was the most overtly autobiographical of the stories—Eisner used the real names of his family members: his parents Sam and Fannie, his brother Petey, and himself, "Willie". Eisner called "Cookalein" "an honest account of [his] coming of age" that was "a combination of invention and recall".

== Background ==
Frans Masereel, 25 Images of a Man's Passion, 1918. Eisner was inspired by wordless novels of the 1920s and 1930s.

Will Eisner was born in New York in 1917 to poor Jewish immigrants. He has said he wanted a career in the arts, but that poor Jews at the time were restricted from upper-class universities where he could study it. Like others of his generation, he turned to comics as an artistic outlet, a career he began in 1936. In the late 1930s he co-owned a studio which produced content for comic books; he left the studio in 1940 to produce his best-known creation, the formally inventive The Spirit, which ran as a newspaper insert from 1940 to 1952. After its end, Eisner withdrew from the comic book world and focused on the American Visuals Corporation, which he had founded in 1948 to produce educational and commercial comics and related media. With the rise of comics fandom in the 1970s, Eisner found there was still interest in his decades-old Spirit comics, and that the fans wanted more work from him. After American Visuals went out of business in 1972, Eisner entered a deal with underground comix publisher Denis Kitchen to reprint old Spirit stories. Other reprints followed, but Eisner was unwilling to do new Spirit stories—instead, he wanted to do something more serious, inspired in part by the wordless novels of Lynd Ward he first read in 1938, and similar work by the Flemish Frans Masereel and the German Otto Nückel.

Eisner had had greater artistic ambitions for comics since his time doing The Spirit. Since the 1950s, he had been developing ideas for a book, but was unable to gain support for them, as comics was seen by both the public and its practitioners as low-status entertainment; at a meeting of the National Cartoonists Society in 1960, Rube Goldberg rebuked Eisner's ambitions, saying, "You are a vaudevillian like the rest of us ... don't ever forget that!"

With the critical acceptance of underground comix in the 1970s, Eisner saw a potential market for his ideas. In 1978, he produced his first book-length, adult-oriented work, A Contract with God. He marketed it as a "graphic novel"—a term which had been in use since the 1960s, but was little known until Eisner popularized it with Contract. Though it was a modest commercial success, Eisner was financially independent, and soon set to work on another graphic novel Life on Another Planet, and completed eighteen further graphic novels before his death in 2005; two featured the autobiographical Willie from the story "Cookalein": The Dreamer (1986) and To the Heart of the Storm (1991).

I can't attribute the pattern of my life to the hand of God, although I would like to because it would seem that somewhere there is a hand that is guiding it. That would be a great comfort. But I can't find any reason to it.

— Will Eisner

Eisner was brought up in a religious household, but himself was a reluctant disbeliever. In 1970, his sixteen-year-old daughter Alice died after an eighteen-month battle with leukemia. Eisner was enraged, and questioned how a God could let such a thing happen; he dealt with his grief by immersing himself in his work. When working on "A Contract with God", he tried to capture these emotions by acting out Frimme Hersh's character in his head.

== Style ==
The narration is lettered as part of the artwork, rather than being set apart in caption boxes, and Eisner makes little use of conventional box-style panels, often avoiding panel borders entirely, delimiting spaces with buildings or window frames instead. Pages are uncrowded and have large drawings which focus on facial expression. He allowed the length of the stories to develop based on their content, rather than a set page count as was traditional in comics before that time. Eisner emphasizes the urban setting with dramatic, vertical perspective, and dark artwork with much chiaroscuro, and uses visual motifs to tie the stories together. The dark, vertical rain surrounding Hersh when he buries his daughter in the first story is echoed by the revised final image of the last story, in which Willie stares out into a city sky in a similar hatched rainy "Eisenshpritz" (Note: "Eisenshpritz" is a term cartoonist Harvey Kurtzman used to describe Eisner's style of drawing rain.) style. The monochromatic artwork was printed in sepia tones, rather than conventional black-and-white.

In contrast to comics in the superhero genre, in which Eisner did prominent work early in his career, the characters in A Contract with God are not heroic; they often feel frustrated and powerless, even when performing seemingly heroic deeds to help their neighbors. The characters are rendered in a caricatured manner that contrasts with the realistic backgrounds, though the backgrounds are rendered in less detail than in Eisner's work in The Spirit; according to writer Dennis O'Neil, this style mimics the impressionistic sense of memory. Eisner explored these sorts of characters and situations further in his other Dropsie Avenue books, such as A Life Force.

== Analysis ==
The stories share themes of disillusionment and frustration over thwarted desires. Frimme Hersh grieves over the death of his daughter, which he perceives as a breach of his contract with God; street singer Eddie returns to insignificance when he finds himself unable to find his would-be benefactor; Goldie's and Willie's romantic ideals are disillusioned after her near-rape and his seduction. Violence also ties the stories together; Eddie's wife-beating is mirrored by the beating Willie's seductress receives from her husband.

Rosie steals the superintendent's money box in "The Super". Panels lack traditional frames and characters are neither simply good nor evil.

The characters are depicted neither as purely good or evil: for example, Rosie in "The Super" triumphs over the racist, abusive superintendent by stealing his money, having him framed for pedophilia, and driving him to suicide. Confinement is a prominent theme; Eisner chooses perspectives through which the reader views the characters framed by doorways, window frames, or sheets of rain. Frimme Hersh seeks freedom from oppressive Eastern European antisemitism; there is a feeling of elation for characters in the final story as they find their way out of the tenement's, and the city's, confinement.

According to academic Derek Royal, Jewish ethnicity is prominent throughout the stories; in "A Contract with God" and "Cookalein", religious and cultural Jewish symbolry are prominent, though in the middle two stories, there is little outward evidence of the characters' Jewishness. The two outer stories further emphasize Jewish identity with the extra-urban portions of their settings—the rural Russian origin of the religious Hersh in "Contract", and the Catskill mountains in "Cookalein", a retreat commonly associated with Jews in the 20th century. Eisner deals with representing Jewish identity through community. He juxtaposes individual stories and individual characters, who have different experiences which may be incompatible with one another; this confounds any single definition of "Jewishness", though there is a communal sense that binds these characters and their Jewishness together. Royal argues that Eisner shows the unresolved nature of American identity, in which ethnicities are conflicted between cultural assimilation and their ethnic associations. As the book progresses, the characters move from overt Jewishness to greater levels of assimilation, presented as an ambivalent change that has costs of its own.

Royal argued that the book was not only important to comics studies, but also to the study of Jewish and ethnic American literature. Much like short story cycles common to contemporary Jewish prose, in which stories can stand alone, but complement each other when read as a loosely integrated package, Royal wrote that Contract could be better described as a "graphic cycle" rather than a "graphic novel". He wrote that such cycles, as well as Eisner's, emphasized a heterogeneous multiplicity of perspectives, as "[n]o American ethnic literature can ever be defined monolithically".

Art critic Peter Schjeldahl saw the "over-the-topness" endemic to American comics, and Eisner's work, as "ill-suited to serious subjects, especially those that incorporate authentic social history". The work has been criticized for its use of stereotypical imagery; writer Jeremy Dauber countered that these images reflect Eisner's own memories of his youth and the strictures that Jewish people felt in the tenements. Others said caricaturized character designs conflicted with the otherwise realism of the stories; the appropriateness of the style was defended by others, such as Dennis O'Neil, who said that they better reflect the impressionistic way a child remembers the past.

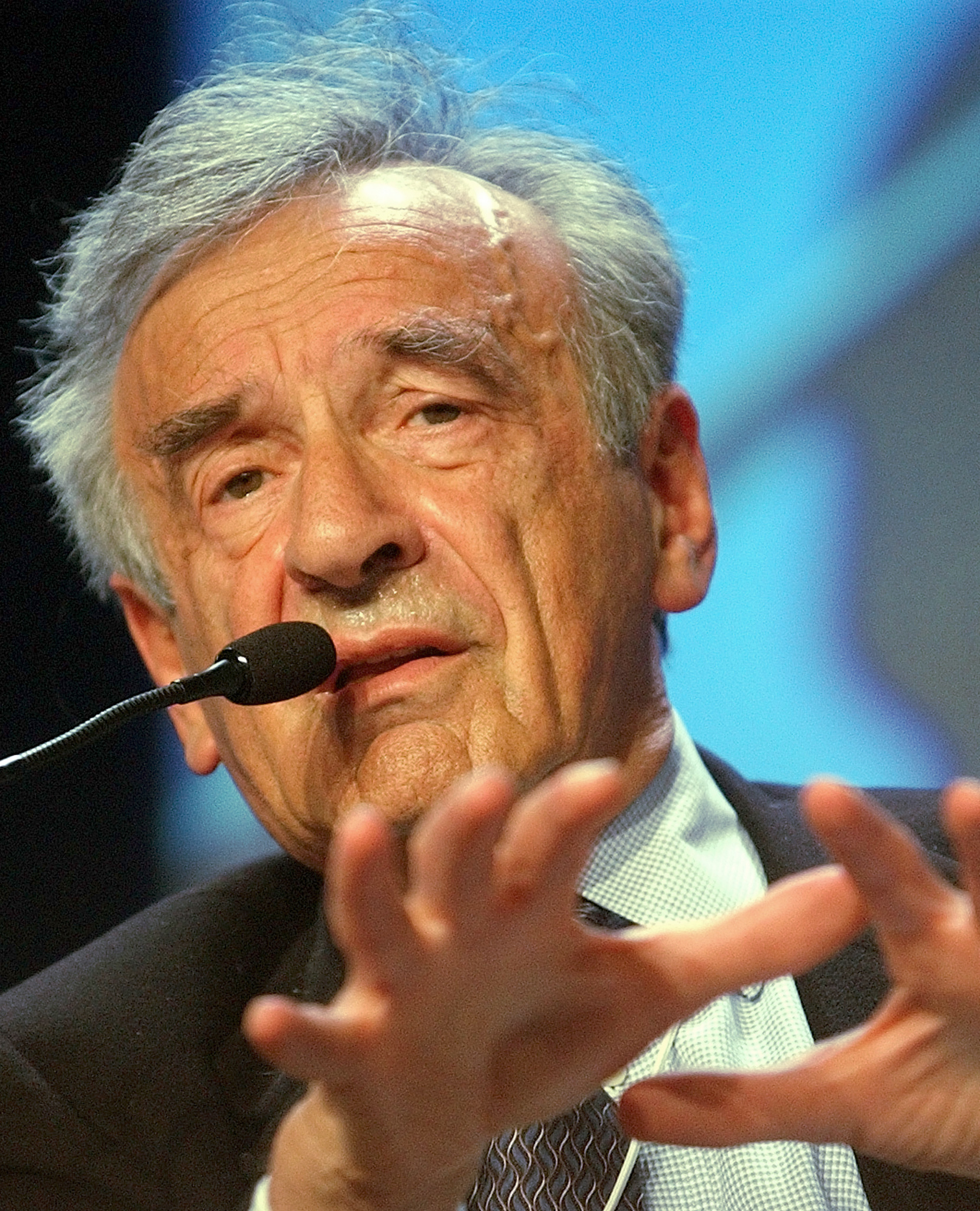
Holocaust writer Elie Wiesel made God's duty to uphold the first commandment the subject of the play The Trial of God (1979).

The concept of a contract or covenant with God is fundamental to the Jewish religion. The idea that God must uphold his end of the first commandment has been a subject of works such as Elie Wiesel's play The Trial of God (1979), made in response to the atrocities Wiesel witnessed at Auschwitz. To art historian Matthew Baigell, Hershe's angst regarding his relationship with God is a modern response to the questions of Hillel the Elder's quoted in the Pirkei Avot: "If I am not for myself, who will be for me? But if I am only for myself, what am I? And if not now, when?" Literary scholar Susanne Klingenstein found Hersh's character unrealistic from the view of Jewish scholarship. She wrote that "the suffering of the righteous" is "one of the greatest problems in Jewish thought", and that a character as devoutly religious as Hersh would not have struggled with what she saw as elementary Jewish teaching.

== Publication history ==
The book took two years to finish. Eisner worked through a variety of approaches and styles, and toyed with using color, overlays, or washes, before settling on a hard-lined style printed in sepia. As he had no deadline, he reworked and resequenced the stories until he was satisfied.

Eisner intended A Contract with God to have an adult audience, and wanted it to be sold in bookstores rather than comic shops; as such, he turned down an offer from Denis Kitchen to publish it. Though he had contacts at Bantam Books, he knew they would be uninterested in publishing comics. To secure a meeting with editor Oscar Dystel there, he called the book a "graphic novel". (Note: Eisner asserted in later interviews that he came up with the term "graphic novel" to secure this meeting, though he had corresponded with Jack Katz, who described his work The First Kingdom as a "graphic novel" in letters to Eisner, the first dating from August 7, 1974.) When Dystel discovered that the book was actually comics, he told Eisner Bantam would not publish it, but a smaller publisher might.

Baronet Press, a small New York publishing house, agreed to publish A Contract with God, which bears the credit "Produced by Poorhouse Press" of "White Plains, N.Y." on its indicia page. Eisner had originally intended to call the book Tenement Stories, Tales from the Bronx, or A Tenement in the Bronx but Baronet titled it A Contract with God, after the lead story, as the term "tenement" was not widely known outside the eastern US. The trade paperback carried the term "graphic novel", though it is a collection of stories rather than a novel. As Baronet was not financially sound, Eisner loaned it money to ensure the book was published.

Sales were initially poor, but demand increased over the years. Kitchen Sink Press reissued the book in 1985, (Note: Kitchen Sink reissued the book in both softcover and hardcover editions, with the hardcover limited to 600 copies with a tipped-in autographed plate.) as did DC Comics in 2001 as part of its Will Eisner Library; and W. W. Norton collected it in 2005 as The Contract with God Trilogy in a single volume with its sequels, A Life Force (1988) and Dropsie Avenue (1995). The Norton edition, and subsequent stand-alone editions of Contract, included extra final pages to the stories. (Note: Norton published A Contract with God in black ink rather than sepia.) As of 2010, at least eleven translations have been published, including in Yiddish (Lambiek, 1984), a language which would have been common with many of the characters in the book.

Dark Horse Books published Will Eisner's A Contract with God Curator's Collection in 2018. This two-volume edition reprints the entire graphic novel at 1:1 size from the original pencil art in one volume and from the original ink art in the second volume. It was nominated for two Eisner Awards in 2019, with editor/designer John Lind winning one award for "Best Presentation".

=== Editions ===
- 1978 Baronet Books, ISBN 978-0-89437-045-8 (hardcover), ISBN 978-0-89437-035-9 (trade paperback)
- 1985 Kitchen Sink Press, ISBN 978-0-87816-018-1 (softcover), ISBN 978-0-87816-017-4 (hardcover limited to 600 copies with a tipped-in plate by Eisner)
- 2001 DC Comics, ISBN 978-1-56389-674-3 (Will Eisner Library)
- 2005 W. W. Norton, ISBN 978-0-393-06105-5 (The Contract with God Trilogy)
- 2006 W. W. Norton, ISBN 978-0-393-32804-2
- 2017 W. W. Norton, ISBN 978-0-393-60918-9 (Centennial Edition)
- 2018 Kitchen Sink Books/Dark Horse Books, ISBN 978-1-5067-0639-9 (A Contract with God Curator's Collection)

== Reception and legacy ==
A Contract with God has frequently, though erroneously, been cited as the first graphic novel; comic book reviewer Richard Kyle had used the term in 1964 in a fan newsletter, and it had appeared on the cover of The First Kingdom (1974) by Jack Katz, with whom Eisner had corresponded. A number of book-length comics preceded Contract, at least as far back as Milt Gross's He Done Her Wrong (1930). A Contract with God attracted greater attention than these previous efforts partly due to Eisner's greater status in the comics community. It is considered a milestone in American comics history not only for its format, but also for its literary aspirations and for having dispensed with typical comic-book genre tropes.

Eisner continued to produce graphic novels in a third phase to his cartooning career that ultimately lasted longer than either his periods in comic books or in educational comics. According to comics historian R. Fiore, Eisner's work as a graphic novelist also maintained his reputation as "a contemporary figure rather than a relic of the dim past".

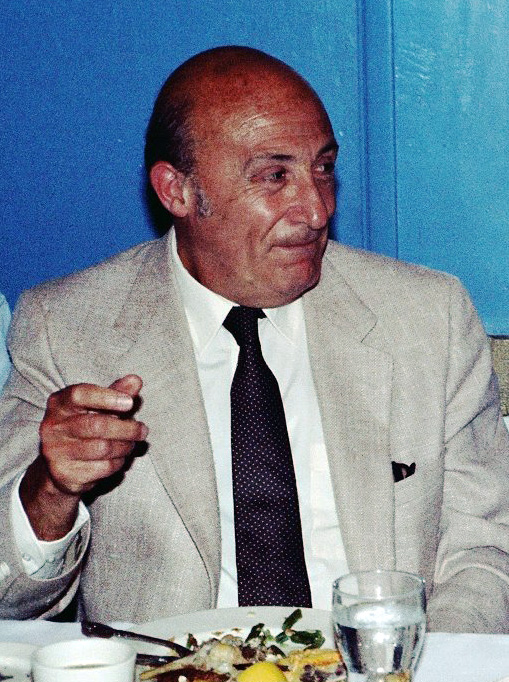
A Contract with God brought greater status within the comics community to Will Eisner.

Editor N. C. Christopher Couch considered the book's physical format to be Eisner's major contribution to the graphic novel form—few in comic book publishing had experience in bookmaking, (Note: Comic books had often been repackaged as books, but not by their primary publishers.) whereas Eisner gained intimate familiarity with the process during his time at American Visuals. The book succeeded in getting into bookstores, though initial sales amounted to a few thousand copies in its first year; stores had difficulty finding an appropriate section in which to shelve it. It was put on display at the Brentano's bookstore in Manhattan, and reportedly sold well. Eisner visited the store to find out how the book was faring after being taken down from display. The manager told him it had been placed in the religious section, and then in humor, but customers had raised concerns that the book did not belong in those sections. The manager gave up and put the book in storage in the cellar.

Early reviews were positive. The book's marketing consisted initially of word-of-mouth and in fanzines and trade periodicals, as mainstream newspapers and magazines did not normally review comics at the time. Comic book writer Dennis O'Neil called Contract "a masterpiece" that exceeded his expectations. O'Neil wrote that the combination of words and images mimicked the experience of remembering more accurately than was possible with pure prose. O'Neil's review originally appeared in The Comics Journal, and was used to preface later editions of Eisner's book. Critic Dale Luciano called the book a "perfectly and exquisitely balanced ... masterpiece", and praised Kitchen Sink Press for reprinting such a "risky project" in 1985.

Eisner's status as a cartoonist grew after A Contract with God appeared, and his influence was augmented by his time as a teacher at the School of Visual Arts in New York, where he expounded his theories of the medium. He later turned his lectures into the books Comics and Sequential Art (1985)—the first book in English on the formalities and of the comics medium—and Graphic Storytelling and Visual Narrative (1995). As Eisner's social esteem grew, a distinction developed among publishers between Eisner's pre- and post-graphic novel work; highbrow publishers such as W. W. Norton have reissued his graphic novel work, while his superhero Spirit work has been reprinted by publishers with less social esteem such as DC Comics. The Comics Journal placed the book in 57th place on its "Top 100 English-Language Comics of the Century" list, which called it "the masterpiece of one of the medium's first true artists".

Cartoonist Dave Sim praised the book and wrote that he reread it frequently, but called it "a bit illegitimate" to use the term "graphic novel" for works of such brevity; he stated he could read the book in "twenty to thirty minutes", which he argued amounted to "the equivalent of a twenty-page short story".

== Adaptations ==
At San Diego Comic-Con held in July 2010, producers Darren Dean, Tommy Oliver, Bob Schreck, Mike Ruggerio, and Mark Rabinowitz announced plans for a film adaptation of A Contract with God from a script by Darren Dean, with a different director for each of the four stories.

== See also ==
- Maus
- Sabre
