= List of webcomic creators =

This is a list of notable webcomic creators.

== Webcomic creators ==
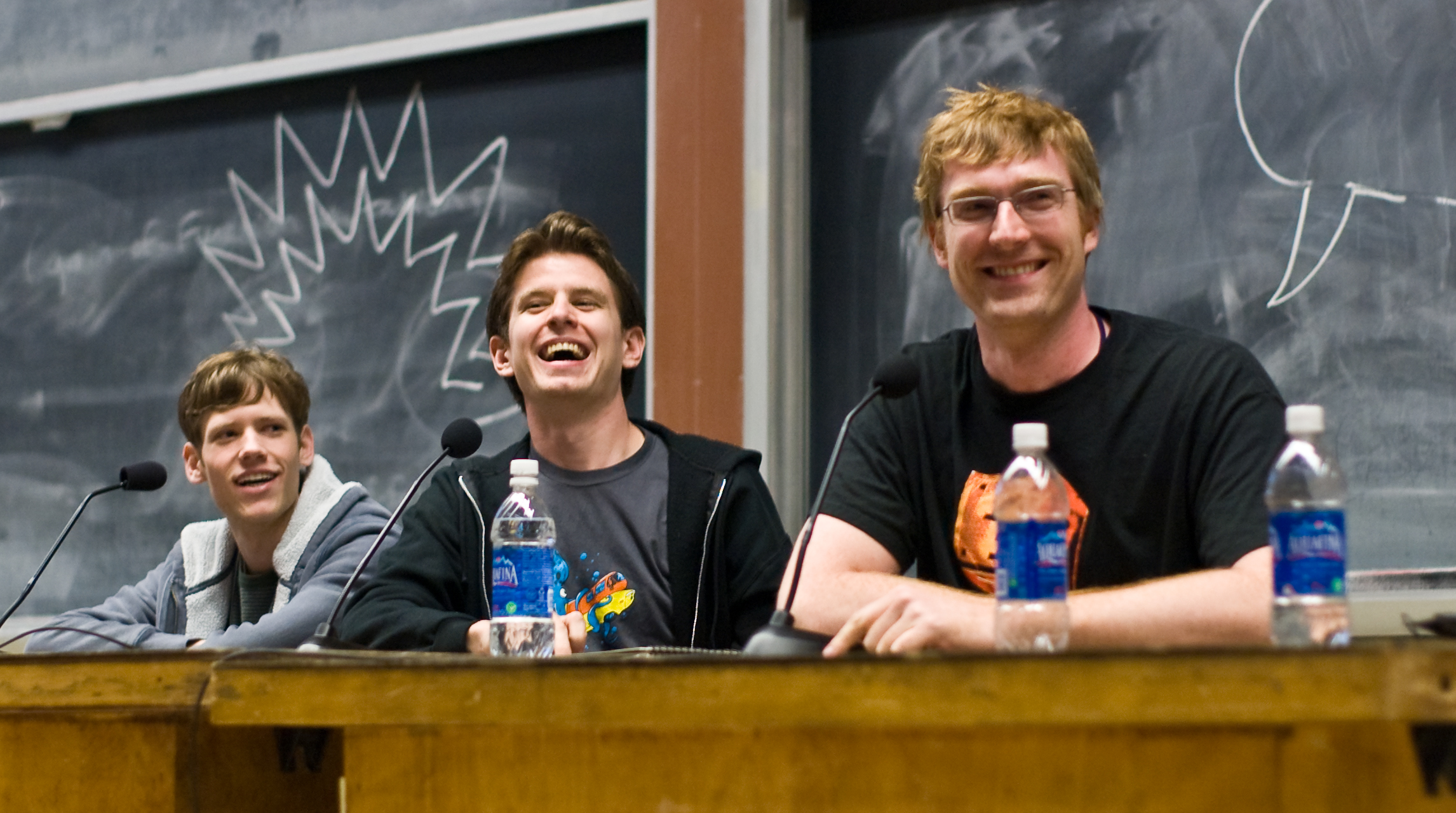
(left to right) 4chan founder moot with webcomic creators Randall Munroe and Ryan North at ROFLCon 2008

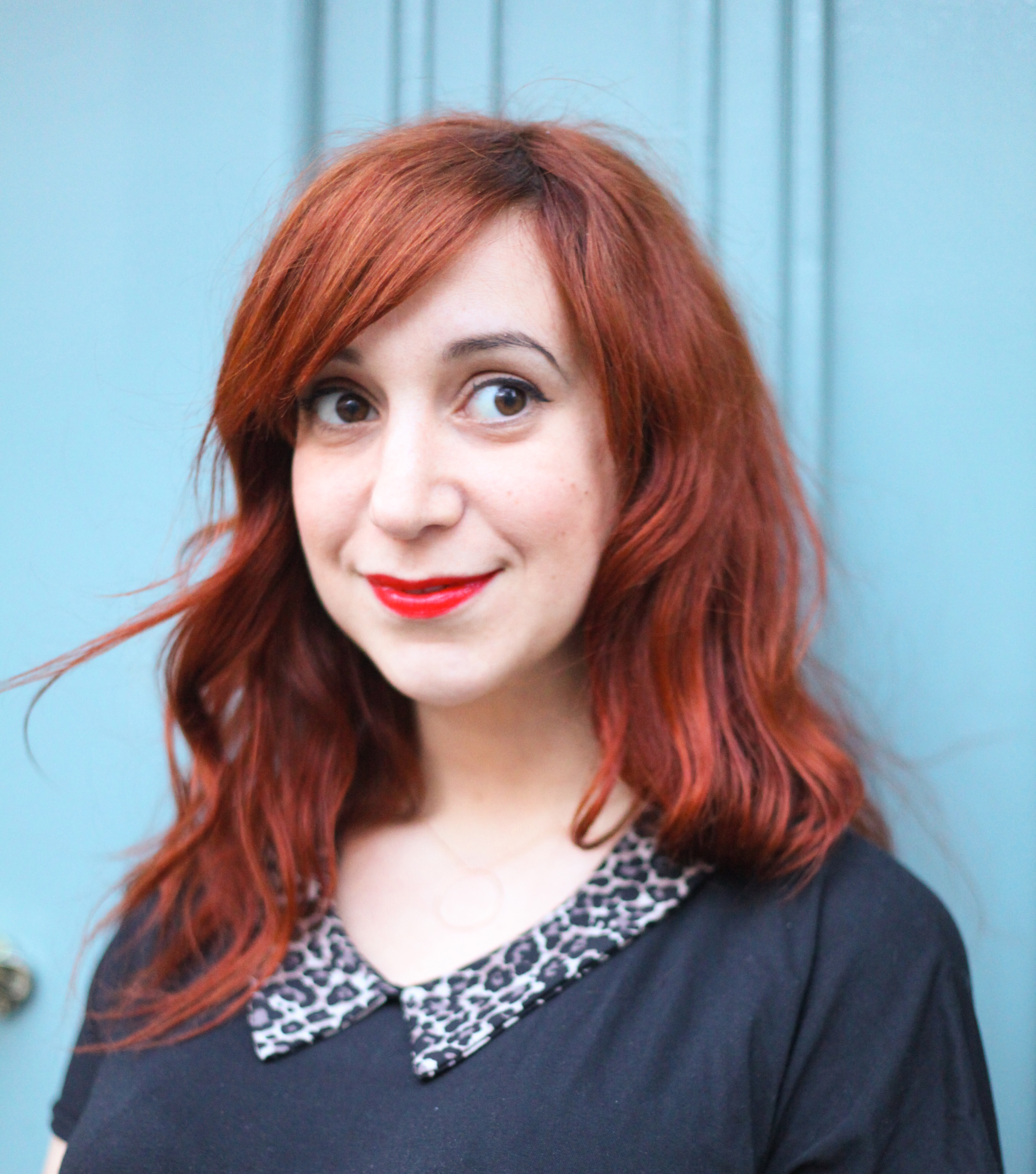
Pénélope Bagieu in 2015

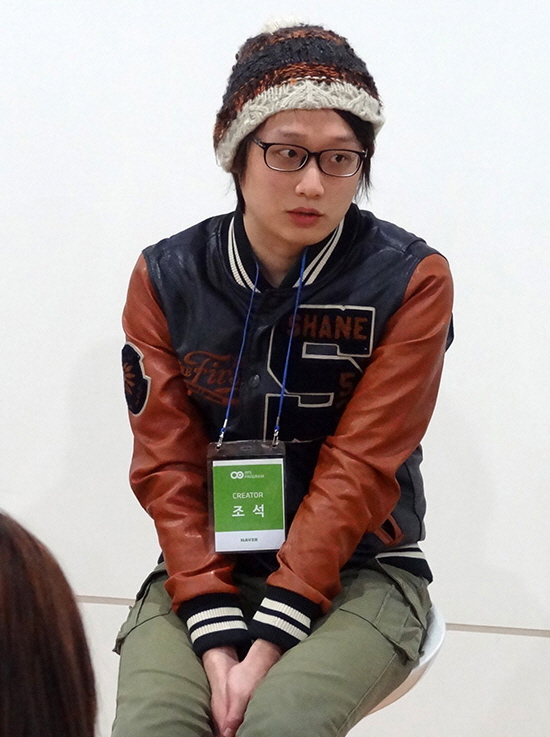
Webtoon author Jo Seok in 2013

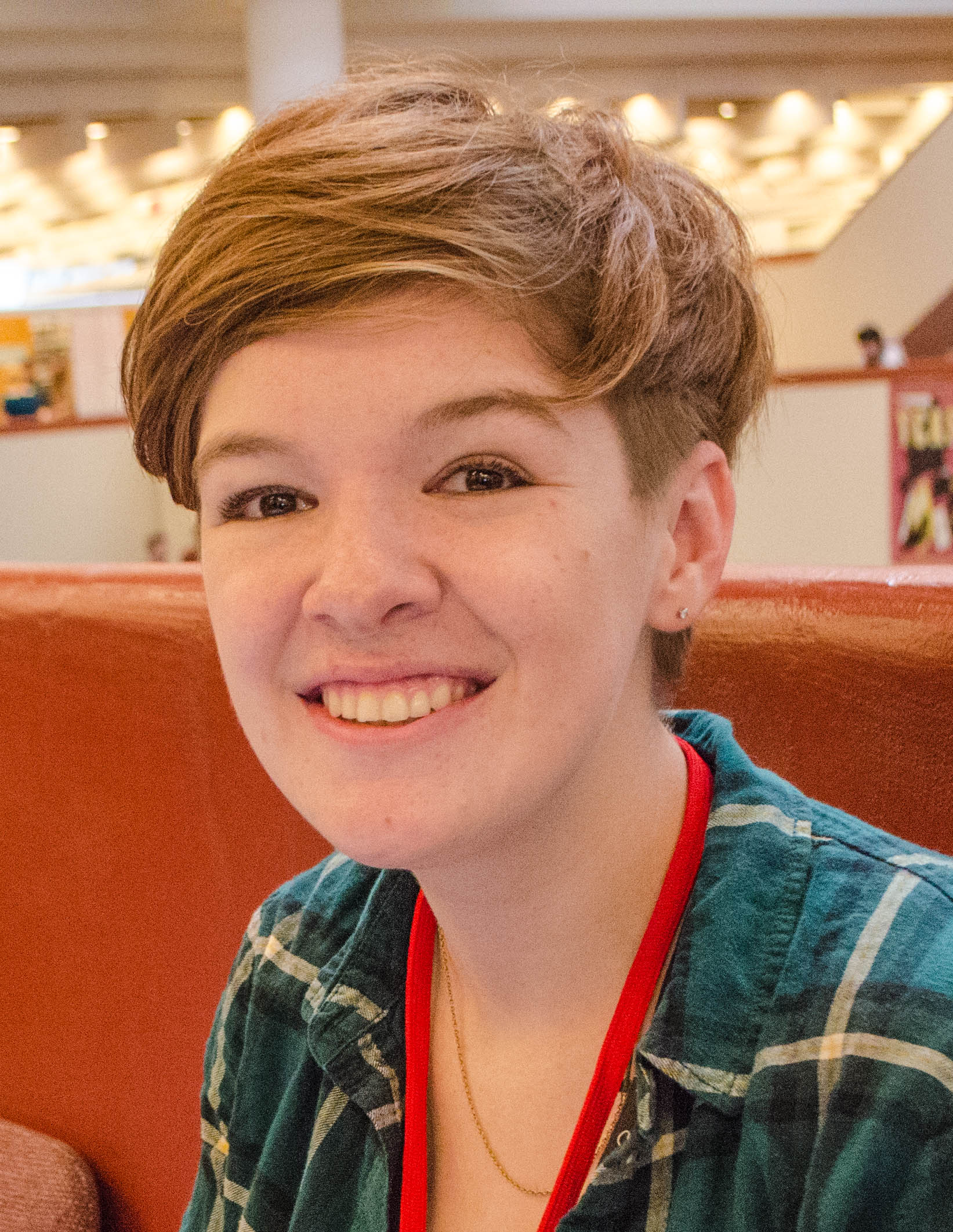
ND Stevenson in 2015

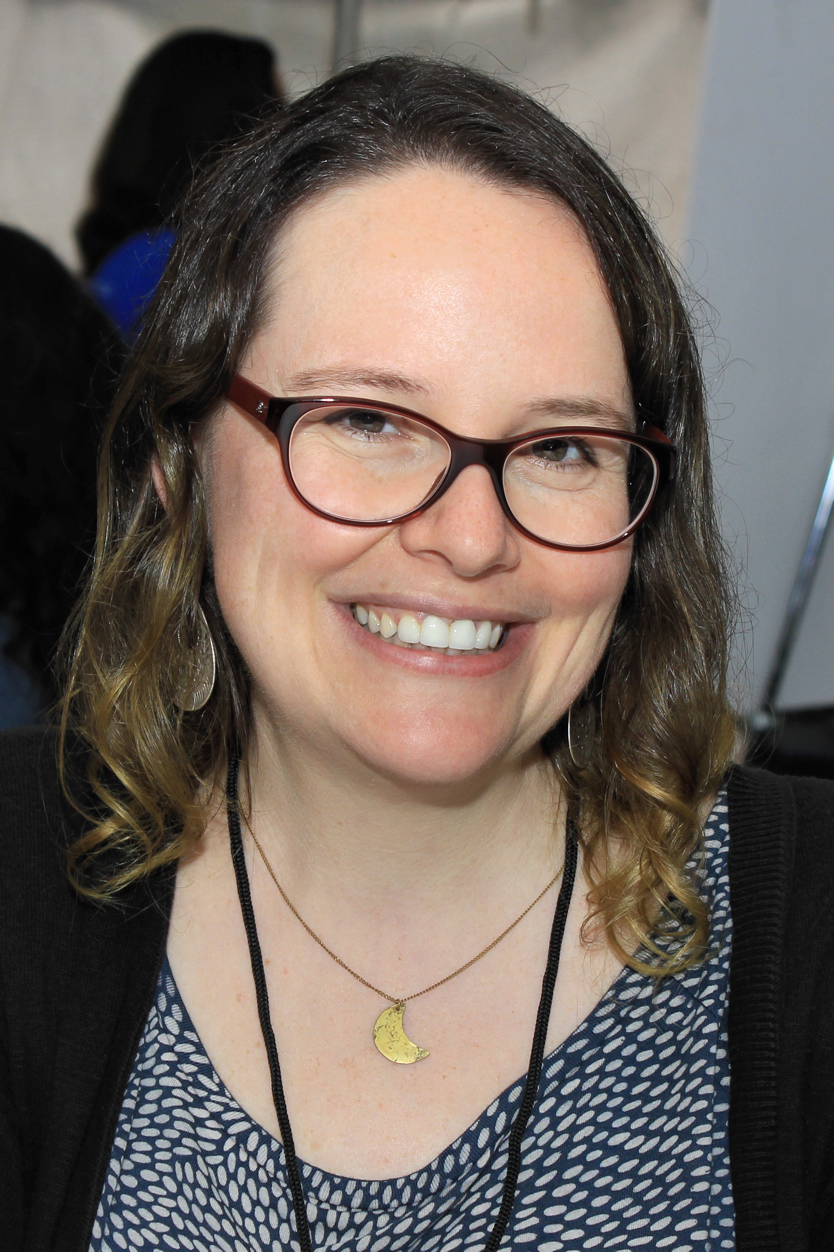
Raina Telgemeier in 2016

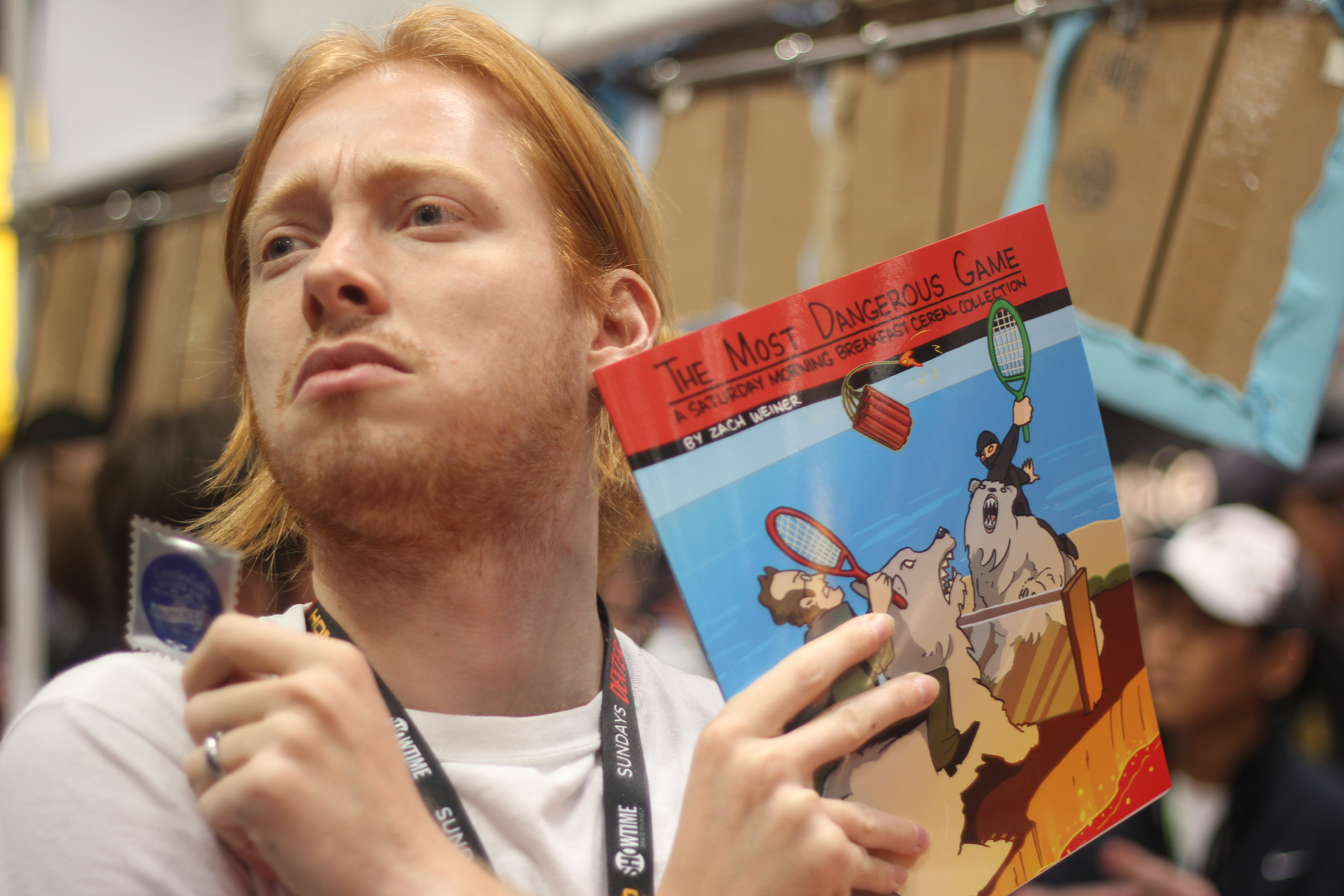
Zach Weinersmith in 2011

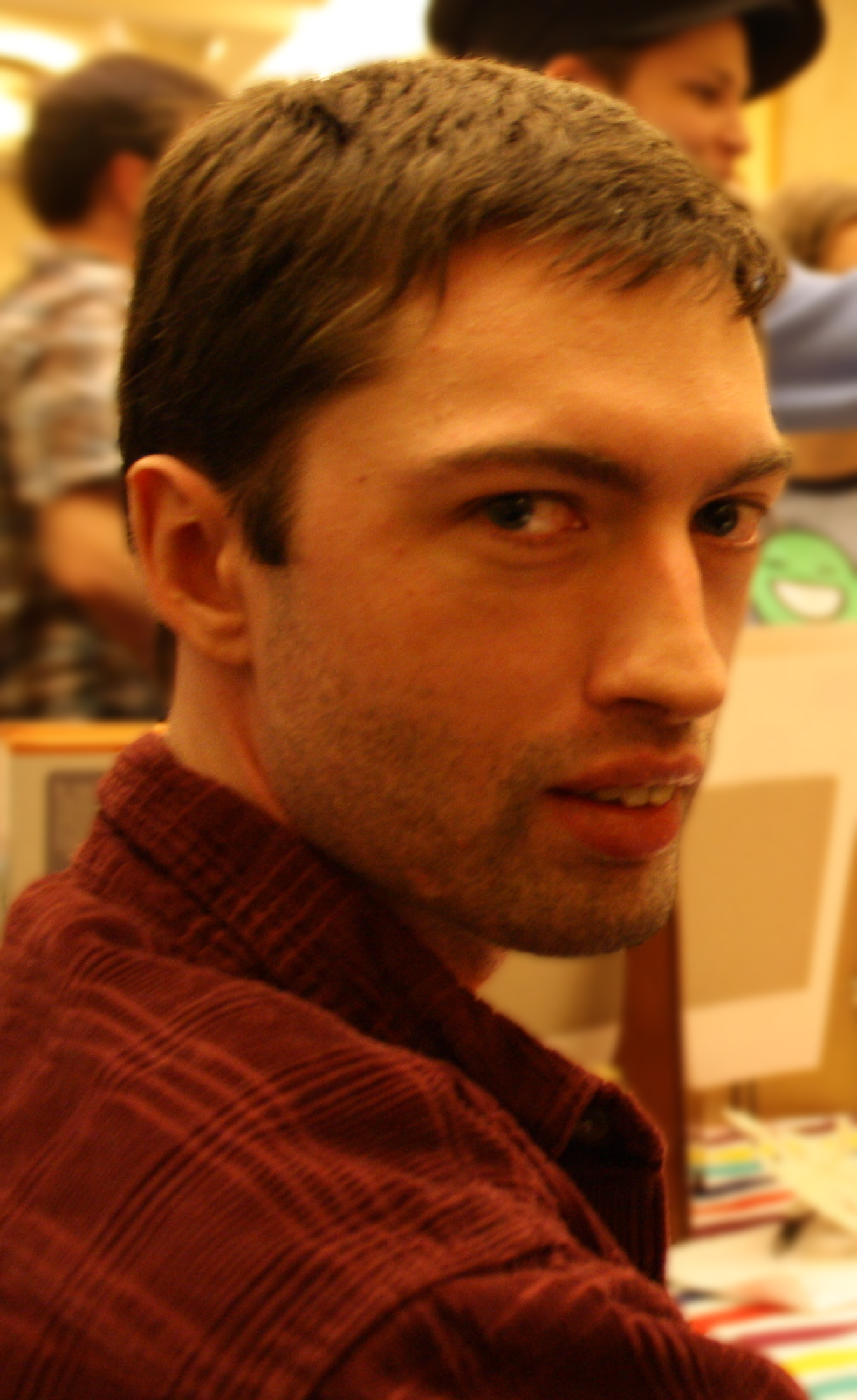
Andrew Hussie at Small Press Expo 2010

Creator	Nationality	Webcomic(s)
John Allison	British	Bobbins, Scary Go Round, Bad Machinery, and Giant Days
Sarah Andersen	American	Sarah's Scribbles, Fangs
Dave Anez	American	Bob and George
Adam Arnold	American	Aoi House
Pénélope Bagieu	French	Les Culottées, My Quite Fascinating Life
Rob Balder	American	Erfworld
Christopher Baldwin	American	Bruno, Little Dee, Spacetrawler, and One Way
James L. Barry	American	The Lost Horn, Lost Marbles, The Last Prophet, Punzel, Your Fun-Packed Rapture Guide, and Rabid Rabbit
Kate Beaton	Canadian	Hark! A Vagrant
Boey	Malaysian	I Am Boey
Sam Brown	American	explodingdog
Michael Buonauro	American	Marvelous Bob
Tim Buckley	American	Ctrl+Alt+Del
Rich Burlew	American	The Order of the Stick
Mary Cagle, aka Cube	American	Kiwi Blitz, Let's Speak English, Sleepless Domain
Max Cannon	American	Red Meat
E. M. Carroll	Canadian	His Face All Red, The Hole the Fox Did Make
Sandy Carruthers	Canadian	Canadiana: the New Spirit of Canada
Rodney Caston	American	Megatokyo
Jorge Cham	American	Piled Higher and Deeper
Svetlana Chmakova	Canadian	Chasing Rainbows, Night Silver
Mitch Clem	American	Nothing Nice To Say, San Antonio Rock City, and My Stupid Life
Brian Clevinger	American	8-Bit Theater, Atomic Robo
Joey Comeau	Canadian	A Softer World
Chris Crosby	American	Superosity, Sore Thumbs
Evan Dahm	American	Rice Boy, Order of Tales, Vattu
Jonathon Dalton	Canadian	A Mad Tea-Party
Jakub Dębski	Polish	Duże ilości naraz psów
Blue Delliquanti	American	O Human Star
Leigh Dragoon	American	By the Wayside
Brianne Drouhard	American	Harpy Gee
Reza Farazmand	American	Poorly Drawn Lines
Patrick Farley	American	Electric Sheep Comix (The Guy I Almost Was, The Spiders)
Tristan A. Farnon	American	Leisure Town
Jess Fink	American	Chester 5000, Kid With Experience, and We Are Become Pals
J. D. Frazer, aka Illiad	Canadian	User Friendly
Fred Gallagher	American	Megatokyo
Dorothy Gambrell	American	Cat and Girl
Shaenon K. Garrity	American	Narbonic, Li'll Mell and Segrio, Smithson
Cayetano Garza, aka Cat Garza	American	Whimville, Cuentos De La Frontera
Melanie Gillman	American	As the Crow Flies
Daniel Merlin Goodbrey	British	
Brian Gordon	American	Chuck & Beans, Fowl Language
Liz Greenfield	Dutch	Stuff Sucks, Steak and Kidney Punch, Swallow
Brad Guigar	American	Greystone Inn, Courting Disaster, Phables, Evil Inc.
Nicholas Gurewitch	American	Perry Bible Fellowship
Ha Il-kwon	South Korean	God of Bath, Annarasumanara
Christopher Hastings	American	The Adventures of Dr. McNinja
Lea Hernandez	American	Atelier Divalea, The Garlicks
Tom Hodges	American	Various Star Wars-related webcomics
Bill Holbrook	American	On the Fastrack, Safe Havens, and Kevin and Kell
Jerry Holkins	American	Penny Arcade
Abby Howard	American	Junior Scientist Power Hour, The Last Halloween
Andrew Hussie	American	MS Paint Adventures (Homestuck)
Jeph Jacques	American	Questionable Content, Alice Grove, and DORD
Jo Seok	South Korean	The Sound of Heart
Kerry G. Johnson	American	Harambee Hills
Scott Johnson	American	ExtraLife, Experience Points
Kang Full	South Korean	Love Story, Timing
Julia Kaye	American	Up and Out
Dave Kellett	American	Sheldon, Drive
Kazu Kibuishi	American	Copper
Kim Poong	South Korean	
Jon Kinyon	American	The Jimi Homeless Experience
James Kochalka	American	American Elf
John Kovalic	American	Dork Tower, Doctor Blink Superhero Shrink
Mike Krahulik	American	Penny Arcade
Jonathan Kunz	German	War and Peas
Scott Kurtz	American	PvP, Table Titans, The Trenches
Sophie Labelle	Canadian	Assigned Male
Gisele Lagace	Canadian	Ménage à 3, Eerie Cuties, Magick Chicks, Penny & Aggie, Cool Cat Studio, Sticky Dilly Buns, Dangerously Chloe, Pixie Trix Comix
Hope Larson	American	Salamander Dream, I Was there & Just Returned
Jen Lee	American	Thunderpaw: In the Ashes of Fire Mountain
Lee Jong-beom	South Korean	Dr. Frost
Jason Little	American	Bee
Michael Lopp, aka Rands	American	Jerkcity
Sean Martin	Canadian	Doc and Raider
massstar	South Korean	unTOUCHable
Nina Matsumoto, aka Space Coyote	Canadian	Saturnalia, Simpsonzu
Brooke McEldowney	American	Pibgorn
Vivienne Medrano, aka VivziePop	American	ZooPhobia
Matt Melvin	American	Cyanide & Happiness, The Last Nerds on Earth
Scott Meyer	American	Basic Instructions
R. K. Milholland	American	Something Positive, New Gold Dreams, and Super Stupor
Eric Millikin	American	Witches and Stitches, Fetus-X
Erika Moen	American	Bucko, Dar!, and Oh Joy Sex Toy
Sergio S. Morán	Spanish	¡Eh, tío!, El Vosqué
David Morgan-Mar, aka DangerMouse	Australian	Irregular Webcomic!, Infinity on 30 Credits a Day, and Darths & Droids
Brennan Lee Mulligan	American	Strong Female Protagonist
Randall Munroe	American	xkcd
Jamie Noguchi	American	Yellow Peril, Sherlock Holmes' Seriously Short Mini Mysteries, and Erfworld
Ryan North	Canadian	Dinosaur Comics
Alex Norris	British	Dorris McComics, Webcomic Name, How to Love, Hello World!
Oh Seong-dae	South Korean	Tales of the Unusual, The Cliff, My Wife's Memories, Beauty Water
One	Japanese	One-Punch Man, Mob Psycho 100
Lee Knox Ostertag	American	Strong Female Protagonist
Aarthi Parthasarathy	Indian	The Royal Existentials, Urbanlore
Michael H. Payne	American	Terebinth, Daily Grind
Elizabeth Pich	German	War and Peas
Nathan W. Pyle	American	Strange Planet
James Rallison, aka TheOdd1sOut	American	TheOdd1sOut
David Rees	American	Get Your War On
Jennifer Diane Reitz	American	Unicorn Jelly, Pastel Defenders Heliotrope, To Save Her, and Impossible Things Before Breakfast
Natalie Riess	American	Snarlbear
Mike Riley	American	I Taste Sound
Dave Roman	American	Quicken Forbidden, Astronaut Elementary
Jonathan Rosenberg	American	Goats, Scenes from a Multiverse, and MegaGAMERZ 3113T
Gilles Roussel, aka Boulet	French	Raghnarok, Donjon Zénith
Jeffrey Rowland	American	When I Grow Up, Wigu, and Overcompensating
Nick Seluk	American	The Awkward Yeti
Brandon Sheffield	American	No Girlfriend Comics
Dana Simpson	American	Ozy and Millie, I Drew This
Nicole Skeltys	Australian	Pigeon Coup
Ted Slampyak	American	Jazz Age Chronicles
Ryan Sohmer	Canadian	Least I Could Do, Looking For Group
Kean Soo	Canadian	Jellaby
ND Stevenson	American	Nimona
Kris Straub	American	Checkerboard Nightmare, Starslip, Chainsawsuit, Broodhollow, and F Chords
Minna Sundberg	Finnish	A Redtail's Dream, Stand Still, Stay Silent
Howard Tayler	American	Schlock Mercenary
Raina Telgemeier	American	Smile
Dean Trippe	American	Butterfly
Spike Trotman	American	Templar, Arizona, Smut Peddler
Andrew Tsyaston	American	Owl Turd Comix, Shen Comix, Blue Chair Comics
Jason Turner	Canadian	True Loves
Ursula Vernon	American	Digger, Irrational Fears
Jason Waltrip	American	Fans, Penny & Aggie, QUILTBAG, Guilded Age
Nick Walker	American	Weird Luck
John Waltrip	American	Rip and Teri, Guilded Age
Zach Weinersmith	American	Saturday Morning Breakfast Cereal, Captain Stupendous, Snowflakes
Drew Weing	American	The Creepy Case Files of Margo Maloo, Set to Sea, and Pup
Chuck Whelon	British	Pewfell
David Willis	American	Roomies!, It's Walky!, Shortpacked!, and Dumbing of Age
Kris Wilson	American	Cyanide & Happiness
Alex Woolfson	American	Artifice, The Young Protectors
Yang Woo-suk	South Korean	If Thou Must Love Me, V, and Steel Rain
Yoon Tae-ho	South Korean	Misaeng, Moss
Hampton Yount	American	Rob and Elliot

== Traditional comics creators ==
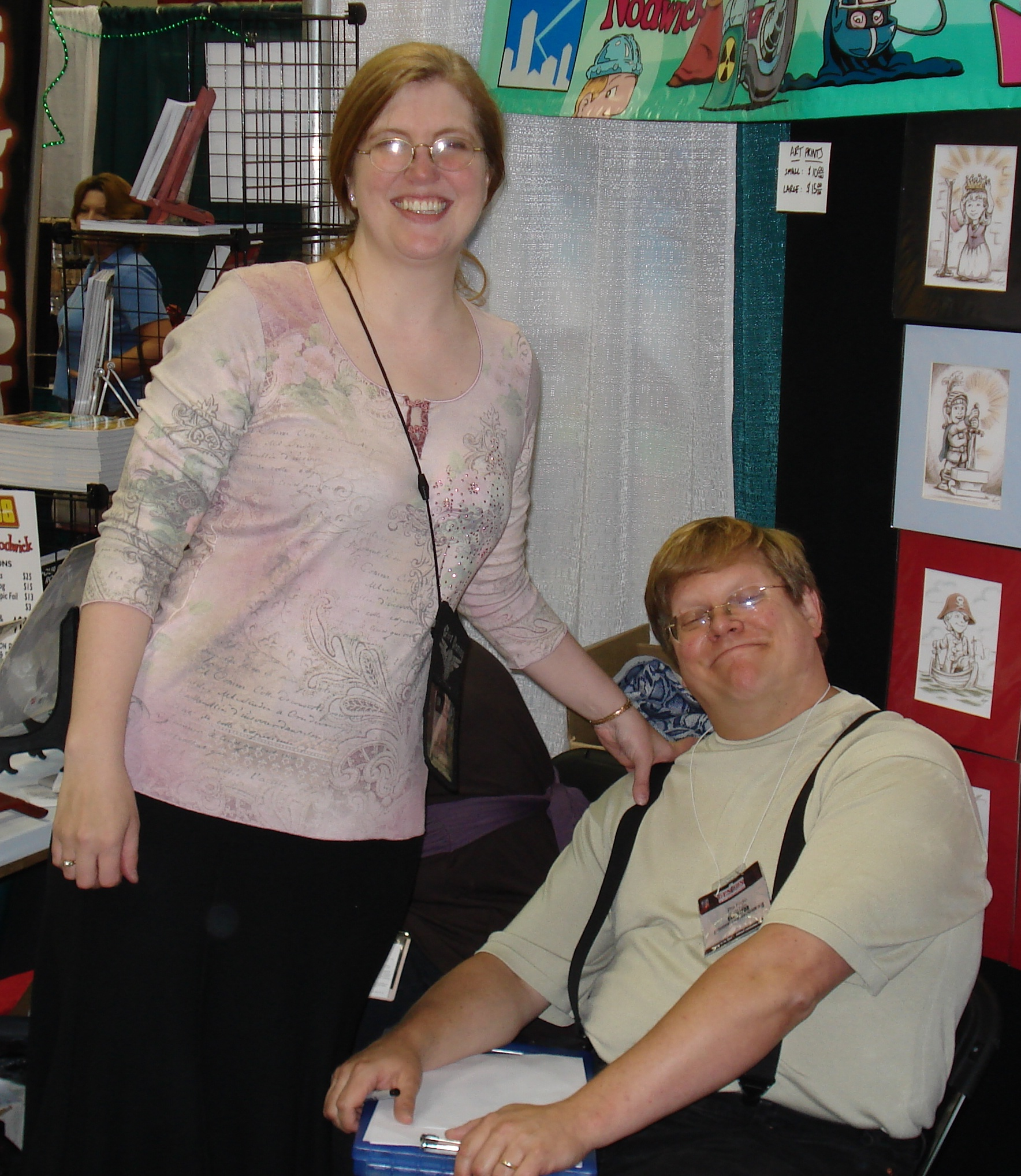
Phil and Kaja Foglio in 2007

Various traditional comic artists have created notable webcomics over the years.

- Scott Adams started integrating the World Wide Web for his Dilbert comics in the late 1990s.
- Slam Dunk-creator Takehiko Inoue started releasing his webcomic Buzzer Beater in 1997.
- Scott McCloud created various experimental webcomics in the late 1990s and early 2000s, including The Morning Improv and The Right Number.
- Aaron William's Nodwick and PS238 debuted in print before moving online in 2001 and 2006, respectively.
- Phil and Kaja Foglio moved their long-running comic book series Girl Genius to a webcomic format in 2005.
- Stuart and Kathryn Immonen co-authored Moving Pictures in the late 2000s.
- David Gallaher and Steve Ellis created High Moon for Zuda in 2007.
- Cameron Stewart started working on Sin Titulo in 2007.
- Warren Ellis created FreakAngels with artist Paul Duffield in 2008.
- Víctor Santos started his webcomic series Polar in 2012.
- Brian K. Vaughan and Marcos Martín created The Private Eye in 2013.
- Jason Shiga began posting Demon in 2014.
