= Tim Buckley (disambiguation) =

Tim Buckley (1947–1975) was an American musician.

Tim Buckley may also refer to:

- Tim Buckley (album), 1966
- Tim Buckley (basketball) (born 1963), American college basketball coach
- Mortimer J. Buckley (born 1969), American business executive
- T. Buckley, Canadian singer-songwriter
- Tim Buckley (comics) (born 1981), American webcomic artist and writer
- Timothy Buckley, subject of The Tailor and Ansty
- Thomas Buckley (1942–2015), American anthropologist and Buddhist monastic, known as Tim
