= Lilah =

Lilah:

- Lilah - alternative name of planet Eris
- Lilah - given name
  - Lilah MacManus, a character from the Ctrl+Alt+Del webcomic
  - Lilah Morgan
  - Lilah Yassin
  - Lilah Perry
