= Brian Gordon =

Brian or Bryan Gordon may refer to:

- Brian Gordon (baseball) (born 1978), American baseball player
- Brian Gordon (cartoonist) (born c. 1970), American cartoonist
- Bryan Gordon, American film and television director
