= Pénélope Bagieu =

French illustrator and comic designer

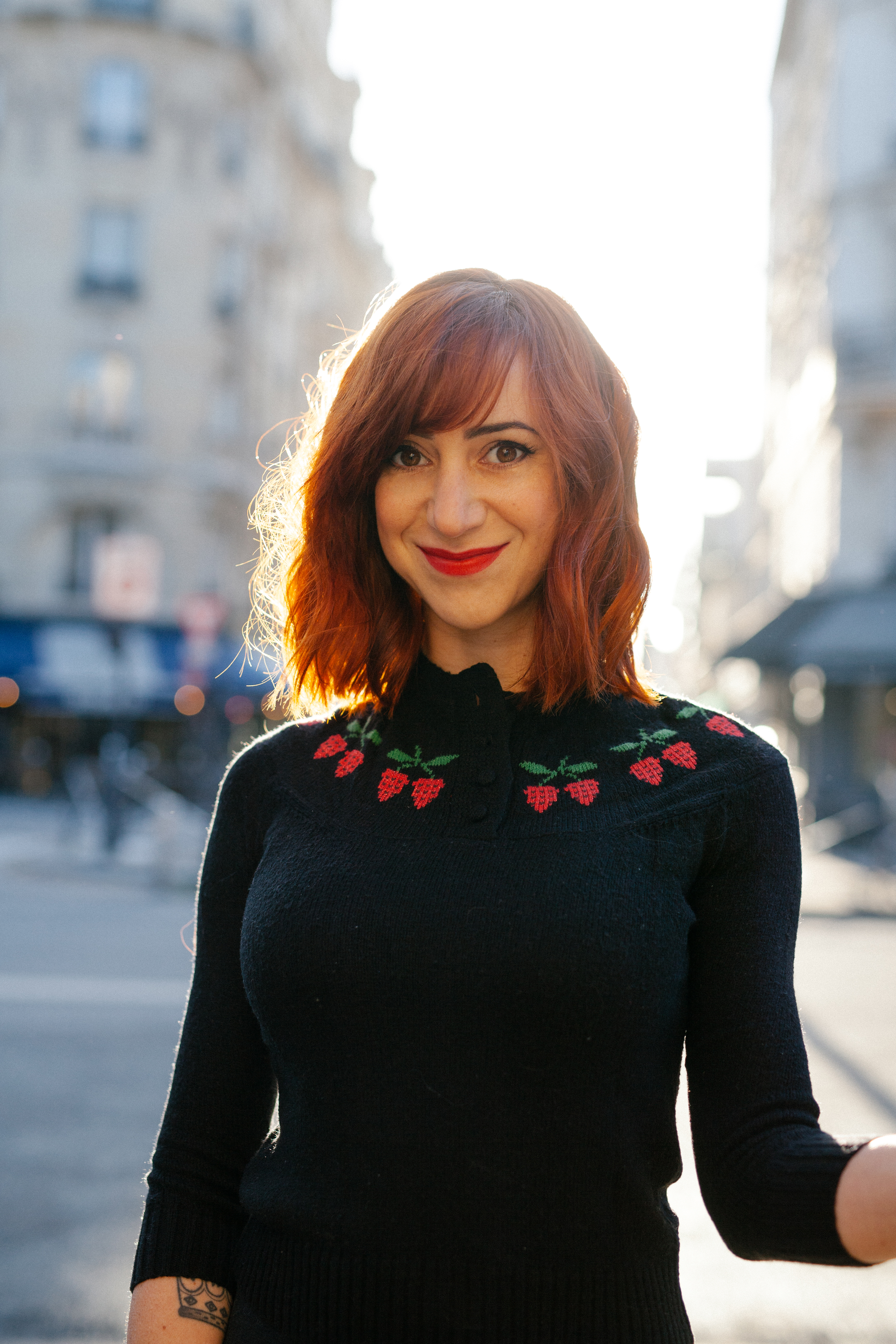
- Bagieu in 2019
- Born: 22 January 1982 (age 44)
- Notable works: Exquisite Corpse, California Dreaming, Brazen: Rebel Ladies Who Rocked the World

Pénélope Bagieu (French: [penelɔp baʒjø]; born 22 January 1982, Paris) is a French illustrator and comic designer. She is best known for her blog BDs (French webcomics in blog format) My Quite Fascinating Life and Les Culottées. Les Culottées was compiled and released in English as the graphic novel Brazen: Rebel Ladies Who Rocked the World, which received widespread recognition. She has also created blog BDs California Dreamin' and Joséphine.

On July 20, 2019, she received an Eisner Award for Best U.S. Edition of International Material at San Diego Comic-Con, for Brazen: Rebel Ladies Who Rocked the World.

== Biography ==
Penelope Bagieu studied animation at the École nationale supérieure des Arts Décoratifs in Paris where she graduated in 2006. She then studied at Central Saint Martins College of Art & Design. Bagieu is in a rock band where she plays drums, and is a fan of nature shows. Penelope Bagieu graduated with a baccalauréat in Economic and Social.

== Career ==
Bagieu created a short animated film entitled No More Laughter. She has created illustrations for advertising campaigns, including for Marie frozen food, on television and on the internet.

In September 2008, she released the first volume of Josephine, a comic which portrays a character commissioned by Femina magazine. In March 2008, she invented the character Charlotte to launch a new magazine, Oops, which features the adventures of a sassy girl at the forefront of verbal and clothing trends, and reviews the daily salient topics which are as varied as they are unusual. She set up the website O Christmas tree for Christmas 2008 in partnership with the Red Cross and Orange, with the aim of giving gifts to poor children. She published the graphic novel Exquisite Corpse in 2010. In 2012, she published The White Page (La Page blanche) in collaboration with French cartoonist Boulet. In February 2013, at the 40th international Angoulême International Comics Festival, she was named Chevalier of Arts and Letters by the Minister of Culture and Communication. On June 19, 2013, the movie Joséphine was released. It was an adaptation of Bagieu's comic strip by Agnès Obadia, and featured leading French actress Marilou Berry. In September 2013, she published the first volume of Stars of the Stars with Joann Sfar. Sfar made the scenario and the Bagieu the drawings. In November 2013, Penelope Bagieu published a humorous cartoon mini tape intended to alert the public about the dangers of profond trawling. Inviting thereafter these readers to sign a petition of BLOOM Association, the ticket has raised hundreds of thousands of signatures.

In 2016, Bagieu created the blog BD Les Culottées for Le Monde, which was eventually compiled into book form and released in 2018. She created one comic a week for 30 weeks, originally in French. Each comic featured a woman with an unusual or inspiring story. The work was released in French in two volumes with the subtitle Des Femmes Qui ne Font Que ce Qu’elles Veulent (Women Who Do as They Please). In English it was released as one volume with the title Brazen: Rebel Ladies Who Rocked the World. The English version has only 29 stories instead of the original 30, as "Phoolan Devi, the Indian Queen of Bandits" was removed because it included the rape of a 10-year-old girl by her husband. Brazen has been translated into 11 languages, and each version is a little different due to local restrictions.

In January 2020, she published a graphic novel of Roald Dahl works The Witches, her childhood favourite book. An English translation is expected for September 2020.

== Works ==
- Exquisite Corpse. First Second. 5 May 2015. pp. 1–. ISBN 978-1-62672-082-4.
- California Dreamin': Cass Elliot Before The Mamas & the Papas. First Second. 2017. ISBN 9781626725461
- Brazen: Rebel Ladies Who Rocked the World. First Second. 2018. ISBN 9781626728691
- The Witches: The Graphic Novel. 2020. ISBN 9781338677430

== Awards ==
- 2011 :
  - SNCF Award of Angoulême International Comics Festival for Exquisite Corpse
  - dBD Award for Exquisite Corpse
- 2013 : chevalier des Arts et des Lettres
- 2018 : Harvey Award of Best European Book for California Dreamin’
- 2019 : Eisner Award (Best U.S. Edition of International Material) for Brazen
