= Loss (Ctrl+Alt+Del) =

2008 webcomic strip by Tim Buckley

"Loss" by Tim Buckley for the webcomic Ctrl+Alt+Del

"Loss", sometimes referred to as "loss.jpg", is a comic strip published on June 2, 2008, by Tim Buckley in his gaming-related webcomic Ctrl+Alt+Del. It is part of a storyline in which the main character Ethan and his fiancée Lilah are expecting their first child. Presented as a four-panel comic with no dialogue, the strip shows Ethan entering a hospital where he sees Lilah weeping in a hospital bed after suffering a miscarriage. Buckley cited events in his life as inspiration for the comic.

It has received negative reception from critics and webcomic creators, especially for the shift in tone in the webcomic, and as an example of "fridging"—showing a killed or injured female character with the intention of provoking a male character. It has been adapted and parodied by numerous other creators and garnered a legacy as an internet meme, usually by activating the viewer's pattern recognition, where the comic is simplified and made overly abstract and minimalist, often with objects placed in similar positions as the characters.

== Background ==
Ctrl+Alt+Del, abbreviated as CAD, is a webcomic series by Tim Buckley. Created in October 2002, the comic focuses on characters Ethan, Lucas, and later Ethan's love interest Lilah. Prior to "Loss", CAD focused on gaming humor, alternating between multi-strip story arcs and one-off gags, often featuring characters sitting on a couch riffing about the game they were playing. Brian Feldman of the magazine New York described the earlier tone of the strip as "amusing at best and puerile at worst, resorting to violence as a punch line with noticeable frequency."

In 2008, during a storyline where Ethan and Lilah were expecting their first child, Buckley posted the strip "Loss", a dramatic tonal shift from previous CAD strips. The strip was a four-panel comic with Ethan entering a hospital, asking a receptionist for directions, talking to a doctor, and finding Lilah crying on her side in a hospital bed, implying that she had suffered a miscarriage. There were two more comics set at the hospital in the storyline, before CAD returned to typical material. When he published "Loss", Buckley wrote a blog post explaining that he had planned the storyline years in advance. Personal experience in his life inspired the strip, namely an unplanned pregnancy and miscarriage with an ex-girlfriend in college.

== Reception ==
"Loss" was received negatively by some webcomic creators and critics. The creators of webcomic series Penny Arcade, Mike Krahulik and Jerry Holkins, were asked about the strip during an interview with Joystiq; both men criticized it, with Holkins describing Buckley as the "Antichrist", humorously citing "Loss" and its storyline as the first horseman of the Apocalypse. Ben "Yahtzee" Croshaw, creator of the video game review series Zero Punctuation, referenced CAD in his episode on video game webcomics, where he mentioned that having a storyline where a character miscarries in a webcomic known for humor would be considered "an awkward tonal shift at best and hugely disrespectful of the subject matter at worst". Kotaku's Mike Fahey, formerly a self-declared fan of the webcomic, agreed with Croshaw's complaints, mentioning being unable to read the series like he used to. In 2021, Fahey would call the strip a "miscarriage of comic publishing".

The strip also faced criticism for being an example of "fridging", a term coined by Gail Simone, where an author uses the trauma of a female character as a plot device in a male character's story. The two strips that followed "Loss" in the story showed Ethan reacting to the miscarriage with his male friends and did not show Lilah or her reaction. Buckley said in a 2015 interview that he did not regret creating the strip, and stated that women had told him that the storyline had helped them. He said that he told the story from Ethan's viewpoint because that was the only reference he had, reflecting that he was afraid of miscalculating a woman's perspective on the subject and was not confident in his writing abilities to do it justice. Buckley later remarked that, if the situation was brought up again in the webcomic, he would do more research on the effects miscarriages have on expectant mothers.

== Legacy as an internet meme ==
A minimalist version of "Loss", consisting of only seven lines

After the strip was published, it immediately became an internet meme, with users from sites such as 4chan and Tumblr creating edits of the strip, recreating it using scenes from other works such as Futurama and Pokémon. 4chan's video game board /v/ would later ban users who created new threads about these edits. Parodies of the strip became more abstract, representing it with objects placed generally in the same position as the characters, such as hot dogs, pipes from Super Mario Bros., or the text from "For sale: baby shoes, never worn". A minimalist version of the meme involves the sequence in the same four-panel style; first panel with a single vertical line, second panel with two vertical lines, the second line slightly shorter, third panel with two equal vertical lines, and the fourth panel with a vertical line and a horizontal line. A response to recognizing the meme, a meme in itself, was "Is this Loss?" The meme saw a resurgence around 2017.

Brian Feldman declared it as "the Internet's Longest-Running Miscarriage 'Joke'". In 2016, the podcast Reply All discussed the strip in their analysis of a variant of "Loss" that was used as a joke about the results in the 2016 United States presidential election. The hosts described it as a pattern that viewers would never recognize unless they were already familiar with it, and said that because the strip was stark and iconic, that also made it easy to parody.

On June 2, 2018, the tenth anniversary of "Loss", the original strip was replaced by an edit of the comic titled "Found". While almost all of the comic remained the same, in the last panel Ethan instead looks at the audience with a smirk on his face. A day later, the original strip was restored with no explanation for the replacement. Julia Alexander from Polygon considered "Found" to be an acknowledgement of the status "Loss" had achieved as a meme, comparing the evolution of the strip to Pepe the Frog. Similarly, on June 2, 2019, the strip was replaced by an edit of the comic titled "Cross". This edit replaced the last panel with one where the birth was successful; however, the child's face is a minimalist version of the comic itself.

== See also ==
- I Will Survive (comic) – 2017 fan fiction comic about abortion
