= Lori Tan Chinn =

American actress

- Occupations: Actress, comedian
- Years active: 1970–present

Lori Tan Chinn is an American actress and comedian. She played Mei Chang in the Netflix series Orange Is the New Black and Awkwafina's grandmother on Comedy Central's Awkwafina Is Nora from Queens (2020–2023). Chinn began her acting career on Broadway, where she played Miss Higa Jiga in Lovely Ladies, Kind Gentlemen (1970). She was also a notable member of the Katherine Dunham Company and performed African dance with Syvilla Fort.

== Early life ==
Lori Tan Chinn is the daughter of Hoisan Chinese immigrants to the United States. She grew up in Seattle, Washington.

Chinn moved to New York City by herself in 1969.

== Filmography ==
=== Film ===
Year	Title	Role	Notes
1982	Author! Author!	Mrs. Woo	
1985	Brass	Hilda	TV movie
1989	She-Devil	Vesta Rose Woman	
1990	Revealing Evidence: Stalking the Honolulu Strangler	Pua	TV movie
1991	What About Bob?	Bus driver	
1992	Glengarry Glen Ross	Coat check girl	
1995	Living in Oblivion	Costume Designer	
1996	Ransom	Woman on Street #3	
1999	Mickey Blue Eyes	Restaurant Owner	
2001	South Pacific	Bloody Mary	2003 Helen Hayes Award for Outstanding Supporting Actress in a Resident Musical
2004	From Other Worlds	Mrs. Kim	
2007	Security	Mrs. Pong	Short
2007	Year of the Fish	Shuk Yee (voice)	Animated film
2008	The Guitar	Mrs. Tzu	
2012	Miss D	Mrs. Ling	Short
2013	Final Recipe	Mrs. Wang	
2015	Chloe and Theo	Landlady	
2022	Turning Red	Auntie Chen (voice)	Animated film
2023	Joy Ride	Nai Nai	
2024	Kung Fu Panda 4	Granny Boar (voice)	Animated film
2026	Sleepwalker	Bai Zhao	

=== Television ===
Year	Title	Role	Notes
1990	Roseanne	Iris	4 episodes
1992	Mathnet	Miss Jessica	Episode: "The Case of the Smart Dummy"
1999	It's Like, You Know...	Daisy	Episode: "Lost in America"
2000	Spin City	Samaritan Nun	Episode: "Mike's Best Friend's Boyfriend"
2000	Law & Order	SEC Investigator	Episode: "High & Low"
2005	Law & Order: Trial by Jury	Mrs. Park	Episode: "The Line"
2013–19	Orange is the New Black	Mei Chang	27 episodes
2020–2023	Awkwafina Is Nora from Queens	Nora's grandmother	starring role
2023	Strange Planet		Voice role
2024	A Man on the Inside	Susan Yang	Pacific View Retirement Community resident council president
2024	Jentry Chau vs. the Underworld	Flora "Gugu" Chau	Voice role

=== Theatre ===
Year	Title	Role	Notes
1970–1971	Lovely Ladies, Kind Gentlemen	Miss Higa Jiga	
1979	G. R. Point	Mama-San	
1988–1990	M. Butterfly	Comrade Chin, Suzuki, Shu Fan	
2015	Gotta Dance	Mae	
2015	Triassic Parq	Twin velociraptor	
