= Strange Planet (TV series) =

2023 animated television miniseries

- Promotional poster
- Genre: Science fiction; Comedy; Anthology
- Created by: Dan Harmon; Nathan W. Pyle
- Based on: Strange Planet by Nathan W. Pyle
- Starring: Tunde Adebimpe; Demi Adejuyigbe; Lori Tan Chinn; Danny Pudi; Hannah Einbinder
- Composer: Isabella Summers
- Countries of origin: United States; Canada
- Original language: English
- No. of episodes: 10

Production
- Executive producers: Alex Bulkley; Corey Campodonico; Amalia Levari; Steve Levy; Dan Harmon; Taylor Alexy Pyle; Nathan W. Pyle
- Producer: Monica Mitchell
- Running time: 19–25 minutes
- Production companies: ShadowMachine; Mercury Filmworks; Harmonious Claptrap; Nathan W Pyle; Apple Studios

Original release
- Network: Apple TV+
- Release: August 9 – September 27, 2023

Strange Planet is an animated science fiction comedy television miniseries based on the webcomic of the same name by Nathan W. Pyle. Pyle co-created the series with Dan Harmon. The series premiered on August 9, 2023, on Apple TV+.

== Premise ==
Blue beings find themselves exploring and trying to understand the complexities and nuances of human traits.

== Cast ==
=== Main ===
All main cast members portray multiple characters which vary between episodes.

- Tunde Adebimpe
- Demi Adejuyigbe
- Lori Tan Chinn as Guide
- Danny Pudi as Regular
- Hannah Einbinder as Manager

=== Guest ===
- James Adomian
- Mamoudou Athie
- Yvette Nicole Brown
- D'Arcy Carden
- Colton Dunn
- Naomi Ekperigin
- Cynthia Erivo
- Fortune Feimster
- Jo Firestone
- Theo Germaine
- Dallas Goldtooth
- Patti Harrison
- Jackie Hoffman
- Erika Ishii
- Jackie Kashian
- Ken Leung
- Riki Lindhome
- Billie Lourd
- X Mayo
- Jessica McKenna
- Tawny Newsome
- Charlotte Nicdao
- Toks Olagundoye
- Bronson Pinchot
- Nathan W. Pyle
- Karan Soni
- Beth Stelling
- Nate Torrence
- Jerry Trainor
- Janet Varney
- Gary Anthony Williams
- Debra Wilson
- Cedric Yarbrough

== Episodes ==
No.	Title	Directed by	Written by	Original release date
1	"The Flying Machine"	Mike Roberts	Dan Harmon and Nathan W. Pyle	August 9, 2023
A popular band splits up, throwing their lives and their fans’ lives into chaos. Elsewhere, an air comfort supervisor’s new role creates turbulence.
2	"Greyscale Finger Bandit"	Charlie Gavin and Caitlin Vanarsdale	Zack Bornstein and Lauren Pomerantz	August 9, 2023
A lovelorn being offers to take care of their crush’s vibrating creature. Next door, a small being insist on adopting an outside creature.
3	"Careful Now"	Maaike Scherff and Monica Tomova	Amalia Levari and Steven Raia and Lauren Pomerantz	August 9, 2023
While at the tumble scrub, a being has a chance encounter with a stranger that leads to an unexpected but exciting opportunity.
4	"The Big Wet"	Charlie G. and Caitlin Vanarsdale	Brydie Lee-Kennedy and Steve Levy and Nathan W. Pyle	August 16, 2023
Tensions between an overbearing lifegiver and their offspring come to a head. Careful Now weathers a mishap on Free Jitter Liquid Day.
5	"Family, Fandom, Footorb"	Katie Aldworth and Charlie Gavin	Steve Levy and Nathan W. Pyle and Beth Stelling	August 23, 2023
Wanting to please their lifegiver, two siblings try bonding over their interests. A footorb referee’s bad call could cost them their dream job.
6	"Key Change"	Charlie Gavin and Maaike Scherff	Demi Adejuyigbe and Steve Levy and Nathan W. Pyle	August 30, 2023
A being struggles with performing at the talent show. Meanwhile, two other beings reluctantly learn to cooperate.
7	"Adolescent Limbshake"	Monica Tomova	Summer Plair and Steve Levy and Nathan W. Pyle	September 6, 2023
Two high-school beings reluctantly team up to plan an event. Meanwhile, at the same school, two best friends have a dramatic falling out.
8	"Tiny Trash"	Katie Aldworth and Charlie Gavin	Dani Michaeli and Steve Levy and Nathan W. Pyle and Lauren Pomerantz	September 13, 2023
A being has an existential crisis on their 25th emergence day as their best friend secretly organizes a party to celebrate.
9	"Before Star Rise"	Maaike Scherff and Caitlin Vanarsdale	Open Mike Eagle and Lauren Pomerantz	September 20, 2023
A couple who run a skin ink parlor are hit with unexpected news. Careful Now’s manager and regular go on an impromptu date.
10	"Double Shadow Day"	Charlie Gavin and Monica Tomova	Nathan W. Pyle and Taylor Alexy Pyle	September 27, 2023
Careful Now is the perfect spot to view a once-every-15-revolutions eclipse, but a mysterious situation might ruin the party.

== Production ==
The series was greenlit by Apple TV+ in June 2021, with Nathan W. Pyle collaborating with Dan Harmon to co-create the series. Amalia Levari was set as showrunner. In July 2023, Tunde Adebimpe, Demi Adejuyigbe, Lori Tan Chinn, Danny Pudi and Hannah Einbinder were set for the voice cast.

== Release ==
The series was released on August 9, 2023.

== Reception ==
Strange Planet received positive reviews from critics. The review aggregator website Rotten Tomatoes reported an 82% approval rating with an average rating of 5.9/10 based on 28 critic reviews. The website's critics consensus reads, "Leveraging its alien conceit to make astute observations about society, Strange Planet is wryly amusing and relatably human." Alan Sepinwall of Rolling Stone praised the show for its "reliable level of sweetness", while noting that most of its humor "hits the level of wry amusement and not much more, not unlike the experience of reading a comic strip, smiling, and saying, 'I get it,' without actually laughing." Lucy Mangan of The Guardian gave the show 3 stars out of 5, opining that the comic strip's premise wore too thin during a season of ten 25-minute episodes. In a more mixed review, Maya Phillips of The New York Times found the show's comedic moments to be more uneven and less interesting than its philosophical musings, writing, "More often than not, 'Strange Planet' is cute and delightful".
