= Ma vie est tout à fait fascinante =

- Author(s): Pénélope Bagieu
- Website: www.penelope-jolicoeur.com
- Launch date: 2007
- Genre(s): Blog BD

Ma vie est tout à fait fascinante (My Quite Fascinating Life) is a blog BD (French webcomic in blog format) created by Pénélope Bagieu. Ma vie est tout à fait fascinante started in 2007 and launched Bagieu's career as a cartoonist. In the webcomic, Bagieu presents her own life experiences through the lens of the character Zoe. In 2012, Bagieu's blog was accessed 60,000 times per day, and a print edition was published by Delcourt.

== Development ==
Cartoonist Pénélope Bagieu created Ma vie est tout à fait fascinante shortly after graduating from the Central Saint Martins school in London. The blog started in 2007, primarily because Bagieu was looking for something to do between two illustration jobs for publisher. Bagieu had been keeping an intimate drawn diary for a long time when she decided to start her blog. Bagieu became one of the pioneers of the "for girls" comics boom, though she has since tried to get rid of her image as a blogger, subverting her established style with Joséphine.

A print version of Ma vie est tout à fait fascinante was published by Delcourt in 2012.

== Content ==
Ma vie est tout à fait fascinante is a general diary webcomic in which Bagieu presents snippets of her daily life. The blog follows the self-insert character Zoe, who works as a hostess. Bagieu explores experiences of her own life, such as unpleasant boyfriends and dark and tiny apartments. In an interview with The Mary Sue, Bagieu stated that "most of all, I also felt like I was entering a nice, warm and soft sweater the first time I found out books and good stories were such a comfy cocoon, like Zoe does at some point." The blog has a feminist slant, making it particularly accessible for a female audience, though the webcomic was not originally created to draw a large readership.

In November 2013, Bagieu posted a short comic on her blog titled "Prends cinq minutes et signe copain" ("Take five minutes and sign, buddy") about the ecological consequences of deep-sea fishing. In this comic, Bagieu criticized the economic "heresy" represented in deep-sea fishing and the few businessmen that benefit of the industry. The publication went viral on Facebook, and a petition against deep-sea fishing by organization Bloom gained over 345,000 signature within two days.

== Reception ==
In 2012, France 24 stated that Bagieu's webcomic "revolutionized the world of comics by addressing adolescents." Later that year, RTBF described Ma vie est tout à fait fascinante as "the biggest success and the star of the BD blogosphere." Bagieu's blog had 60,000 visitors per day and its print version was sold 130,000 times by November 2012.
