= Les Culottées =

2016 blog BD by Pénélope Bagieu

- Author(s): Pénélope Bagieu
- Website: lesculottees.blog.lemonde.fr
- Current status/schedule: Completed
- Launch date: January 2016
- End date: October 2016
- Publisher(s): Le Monde

Les Culottées is a blog BD (French webcomic in blog format) written by Pénélope Bagieu in 2016. Published on the website of Le Monde, Bagieu uses Les Culottées to tell short biographical stories about women. Each comic features a woman from the past or present with an unusual or inspiring story. Bagieu produced one comic a week from January to October 2016, and eventually released the comics in book form. The stories were split into two print publications in France with the subtitle Des Femmes Qui ne Font Que ce Qu'elles Veulent (Women Who Do as They Please). Each one contained fifteen short stories.

The work was released In English as one volume with the title Brazen: Rebel Ladies Who Rocked the World. The English version has only 29 stories instead of the original 30, as "Phoolan Devi, the Indian Queen of Bandits" was removed because it included the rape of a ten-year-old girl by her husband. Translated into 11 languages, Brazen was positively received and received an Eisner Award in 2019.

In 2020 it was adapted as an animated series of 30 episodes for France Télévisions.

== Content ==
Pénélope Bagieu's Les Culottées is presented as a series of vignettes of historical women of various time periods and nationalities. Many of the women Bagieu has covered in this series are frequently overlooked by historians, though she has also depicted several well-celebrated women. Some of the women featured in Les Culottées include Joséphine Baker, Tove Jansson, Clementine Delait, Margaret Hamilton, Josephina Van Gorkum, Nzinga, and Frances Glessner Lee. The storylines presented in Les Culottées are generally somewhat humorous, but Bagieu never focuses too much on comedy, nor does she present the historical information too densely, creating a balance. The stories do tend to be rather short, however, in part due to the lack of sources available about the subjects of the vignettes.

== Development ==
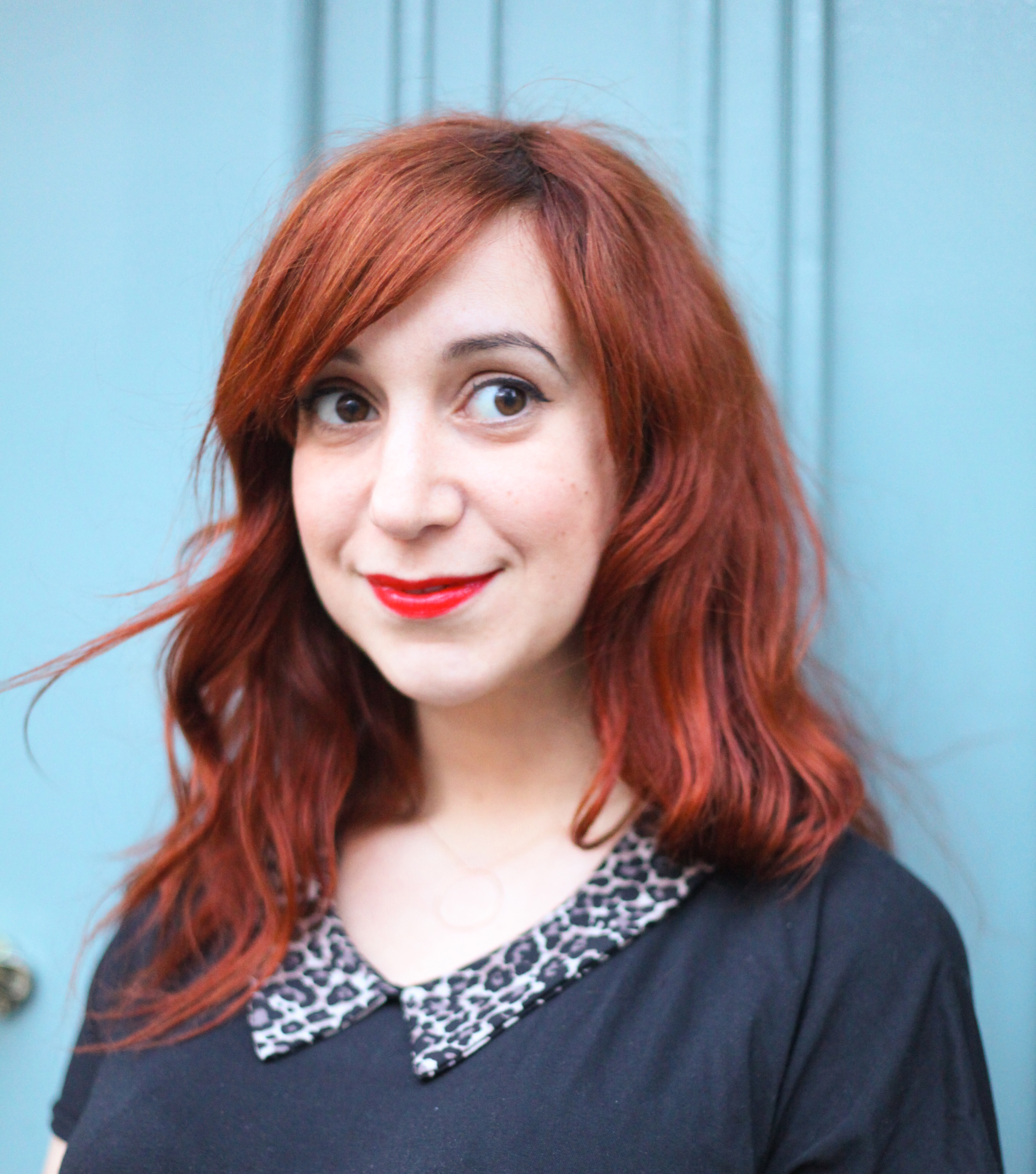
Pénélope Bagieu in 2015

Bagieu had planned to create a blog BD focused on thirty "audacious women" who decide to take charge of their own destiny for a long time, to be published on the official website of Le Monde. When she proposed the project to Le Monde in 2013, the staff was very enthusiastic. When they asked Bagieu if she would really limit the project to thirty stories, Bagieu strengthened her resolve to put real work in the webcomic. Its launch was initially scheduled to coincide with the Angoulême International Comics Festival at the end of January 2016, but Le Monde decided to advance the launch of Les Culottées by three weeks as a response to the public outcry over the all-male Grand Prix de la ville d'Angoulême nominations. Bagieu created Les Culottées so that organizations like Angoulême will "stop being able to pretend to believe that the women who have marked the history simply do not exist," though noting that "there are unfortunately few women in the history of comics ... If you go to the Louvre, you will find quite few female artists."

A print volume of Les Culottées featuring fifteen vignettes was released in September 2016, while a second such book was released in January 2017. The second publication initially marked the end of the project. The French version had the subtitle Des Femmes Qui ne Font Que ce Qu'elles Veulent (Women Who Do Only What They Want). The work was released In English in one graphic novel volume with the title Brazen: Rebel Ladies Who Rocked the World. The English version has only 29 stories instead of the original 30, as "Phoolan Devi, the Indian Queen of Bandits" was removed because it included the rape of a ten-year-old girl by her husband. Brazen has been translated into 11 languages, and each version is a little different due to local restrictions.

== Reception ==
The first volume of Les Culottées sold over 75,000 copies in the first five months after its release.

The English version of Brazen: Rebel Ladies Who Rocked the World received widespread recognition.

== Awards ==
- 2019 : Eisner Award for Best U.S. Edition of International Material
