= War and Peas =

Webcomic

- Cover of the first print edition of War and Peas, published by Andrews McMeel Publishing, showing a parody of the painting American Gothic
- Website type: Comics
- Headquarters: Germany
- Creators: Elizabeth Pich and Jonathan Kunz
- Website: warandpeas.com
- Launched: 7 September 2011; 15 years ago
- Current status: Active

War and Peas is a webcomic by Elizabeth Pich and Jonathan Kunz.

The title is a play on words using the novel War and Peace by Leo Tolstoy.

The comics are in strip format, usually four panels long and characterized by morbid, dark or surreal humour. The comic's world features recurring characters, for example, Slutty Witch, a standalone witch character who counterposes obtrusive suitors, often with black magic.

At an on-stage interview, Pich condemns nihilism despite the dark humor of War and Peas and says that she believes in activism. In the same interview, Kunz adds that he would not describe the comics as cynical: “There's a lot of irony in it and there's definitely a lot of dark humor in it. But we ourselves are pretty hopeful for the future. [...] Often the ending is dark, but our characters survive and they're getting better over time.”

== Publishing ==
Pich and Kunz met at School of Fine Arts in Saarbrücken, Germany. After experimenting with illustrative forms, they found the comic format ideal for their type of storytelling and began to develop the weekly webcomic.

Since 2011, Pich and Kunz have posted once weekly every Sunday to their website and several social media platforms including Instagram, Facebook, and Twitter. They alternate with drawing but usually write together. Starting 2017, they also release their strips on the publishing platform Line Webtoon. Several online and print magazines feature War and Peas comics on a regular basis, including the Italian magazine Internazionale, releasing new strips every week since 2018. War and Peas has been published in several anthologies, such as Launch Party or Block Party – both edited by David Daneman – along with other webcomics, such as Mr. Lovenstein by J.L. Westover, Deathbulge by Dan Martin and Safely Endangered by Chris McCoy.

After Nick Seluk introduced the duo to his publisher, their first book, War and Peas: Funny Comics for Dirty Lovers was released by Andrews McMeel Publishing on March 3, 2020. On July 23, the German translation was published by Panini Comics. On November 5, it was followed by the Spanish translation, published by RBA Libros. On May 6, 2021 the French translation, published by First Éditions, followed. In 2023 it was translated in Italian and published by Edizioni BD.

In 2021, the collaboration with the Rewriting Extinction campaign began. As part of this, Pich and Kunz worked with Richard Curtis and created a comic that was subsequently published in the comic anthology The Most Important Comic Book on Earth: Stories to Save the World by DK. The book consisted of stories created through the collaboration of various comic artists with celebrities and environmental activists, including Jane Goodall, Ricky Gervais and Cara Delevingne. Since then, Pich and Kunz have been regularly publishing comic strips about current environmental issues associated with Rewriting Extinction on their website and social media channels.

Since 2023, they also release their strips on the publishing platform Tapas.

On October 20, 2023 a new strip collection "Salut la terre" was published in French by Les Requins Marteaux and was highly praised by critics and readers. The book was nominated for a prix Tournesol at the Angoulême International Comics Festival 2024.

On April 2, 2024 the book "Once Upon a Workday" was released by Andrews McMeel Publishing again. The book contains several short stories that are very different from the usual comic strips by War and Peas. Told in rhyme, the stories are dedicated to the problems of everyday working life, but also to creativity and mental health. "It reminds me that I don’t walk alone with the hardness of life, and shares some feelings I’ve had about my own life and work life." wrote book blog The Book of Meghan.

Several fan accounts on social media are dedicated to translating the comic strips to various languages, such as French, Spanish and Russian.

== Bibliography ==
- War and Peas – Funny Comics for Dirty Lovers (2020, Andrews McMeel Publishing)
- Once Upon a Workday (2024, Andrews McMeel Publishing)
- Hi, Earth (2025, Andrews McMeel Publishing)

== Reception ==
=== Readership figures ===
As of August 2024, Instagram reported that War and Peas had 1.1 million followers on that service. At the same time, Webtoon reported that they had over 161.000 subscribers with over 44 million views through that service.

War and Peas also has significant follower numbers on Facebook, X, Threads, Reddit and Mastodon.

=== Reviews ===
War and Peas is largely praised on the internet. Bored Panda referred to War and Peas as "one of the most exciting and funniest webcomics in the world" and fellow webcomic creator Nathan W. Pyle states, "It's so nice, really lovely and clean."

Steve Shinney said on the podcast Digital Strips about War and Peas, "It goes to that well of existential dread a lot." Co-host Jason Sigler later compared it to The Far Side.

In the podcast Comic Lab the hosts Brad Guigar and Dave Kellett described themselves as "huge fans" of War and Peas.
