= Sleepwalker (2026 film) =

- Theatrical release poster
- Directed by: Brandon Auman
- Written by: Brandon Auman
- Produced by: Chad A. Verdi; Jennifer Davisson; Phillip Watson; Michelle Verdi; Chad Verdi Jr.; Paul Luba
- Starring: Hayden Panettiere; Beverly D'Angelo; Justin Chatwin; Mischa Barton; Lori Tan Chinn; Kea Ho
- Cinematography: Marcus Friedlander
- Edited by: Tucker Marolf
- Music by: Sebastian Evans
- Production companies: Verdi Productions; Appian Way Productions
- Distributed by: Brainstorm Media
- Release date: January 9, 2026
- Running time: 89 minutes
- Country: United States
- Language: English

Sleepwalker is a 2026 American psychological thriller film written and directed by Brandon Auman (in his feature film directorial debut). It stars Hayden Panettiere, Beverly D'Angelo, Justin Chatwin, Mischa Barton, Lori Tan Chinn, and Kea Ho. The film was released in the United States on January 9, 2026.

This film marks Panettiere's final acting performance prior to her death on August 16, 2026, seven months after the film's release. The film received negative reviews from critics.

== Plot ==
An accomplished artist is haunted by the tragic loss of her daughter, following a car accident that has also left her abusive husband in a coma.

== Cast ==
- Hayden Panettiere as Sarah Pangborn
- Beverly D'Angelo as Gloria Pangborn, Sarah's mother
- Justin Chatwin as Michael Anders
- Mischa Barton as Joelle Anders
- Lori Tan Chinn as Bai Zhao
- Kea Ho as Alexis
- Eric Lutes as Doctor Henson

== Production ==
Principal photography began in February 2025, when it was announced that Brandon Auman would be writing and directing a psychological thriller film, with Hayden Panettiere (who also executive produces the film) cast in the lead role, alongside Beverly D'Angelo, Justin Chatwin, Mischa Barton, Lori Tan Chinn, and Kea Ho.

== Release ==
Sleepwalker was released in the United States on January 9, 2026.

== Reception ==
The film received negative reviews from critics. On the review aggregator website Rotten Tomatoes, 14% of 14 critics' reviews are positive, with an average rating of 3.6/10.

Isabella Suares of Collider criticized the writing in a negative review, stating that the film is "a puzzling story about a woman going on a spiral without any healing prospect." Bloody Disgusting's Paul Lê wrote that "the starting material would have better served as an anthology segment, as opposed to something that feels stretched beyond its limits." For Screen Rant, Gregory Nussen gave the film an overwhelmingly negative review, calling the film's writing "woefully stuck in painfully obvious, literalist overdrive." Brian Orndorf of Blu-ray.com gave the film a rating of D+, criticizing the film for having "increasingly tedious jump scares and acting that can't quite sell the frightmare developing over the run time."

However, Phil Walsh of GVN gave the film positive review and a rating of 7/10 and he wrote: An unsettling deep dive into grief that kept me on edge right until the end, which felt like a perfect ending to a dream. Abrupt and shocking.
