= Awkwafina Is Nora from Queens =

American comedy television series (2020–2023)

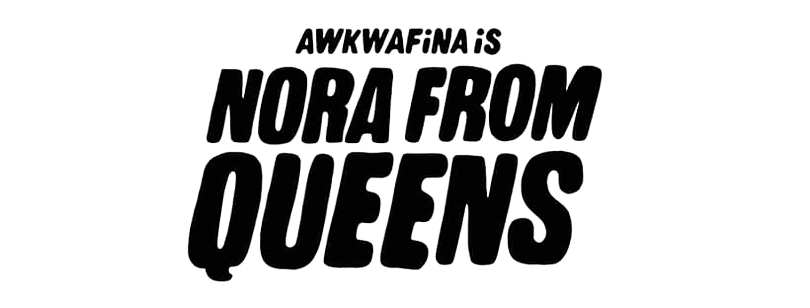
- Genre: Sitcom
- Created by: Awkwafina & Teresa Hsiao
- Starring: Awkwafina; Lori Tan Chinn; BD Wong
- Country of origin: United States
- Original language: English
- No. of seasons: 3
- No. of episodes: 27

Production
- Executive producers: Awkwafina; Karey Dornetto; Lucia Aniello; Teresa Hsiao; Itay Reiss; Peter Principato; Ari Pearce; Andrew Lutin
- Producers: Emily Goldwyn; Sean Fogel; Jordan Kim
- Cinematography: Michelle Lawler; Kat Westergaard; Kyle Wullschleger
- Editors: Jon Higgins; Jessica Brunetto; Jordan Kim; Jon Philpot; Lilli Janney; Stephanie Kaznocha
- Running time: 22 minutes
- Production companies: In Fina We Trust; Artists First; Comedy Partners; MTV Entertainment Studios

Original release
- Network: Comedy Central
- Release: January 20, 2020 – June 7, 2023

Awkwafina Is Nora from Queens (or simply Nora from Queens) is an American television sitcom starring Awkwafina that first aired on January 20, 2020, on Comedy Central. The series was renewed for a second season before the series premiere, and received generally favorable reviews from critics. The second season premiered on August 18, 2021. In May 2022, the series was renewed for a third season, which premiered on April 26, 2023.

== Premise ==
Awkwafina Is Nora from Queens follows a "20-something" young woman, named Nora Lin, in Queens who strives for a larger-than-life existence. Raised alongside her cousin by her dad and grandma, Nora leans on her family as she navigates young adulthood in New York City.

== Cast ==
=== Main ===
- Awkwafina as Nora, a fictionalized version of herself
- Lori Tan Chinn as her grandmother who helps raise her
- BD Wong as Wally, Nora's father (seasons 2–3; recurring season 1)

=== Recurring ===
- Chrissie Fit as Melanie, Nora's best friend.
- Jonathan Park as Doug, one of Nora's friends.
- Bowen Yang as Edmund, Nora's cousin.
- Jennifer Esposito as Brenda, Wally's girlfriend and later wife

=== Guest stars ===
- Gabo Augustine as Teddy
- Wai Ching Ho as Le-Wei
- Jaboukie Young-White as Daniel (seasons 1–2)
- Michelle Buteau as Margaret (seasons 1–2)
- Stephanie Hsu as Shu Shu, Grandma's childhood friend (seasons 1–2)
- Celia Au as Grace (seasons 1, 3)
- Judy Gold as The Librarian (seasons 2–3)
- Ross Butler as Chuck, Brenda's son (seasons 2–3)

==== Season 1 ====
- Laverne Cox as the voice of God
- Ming-Na Wen as Sandra, Nora's aunt
- Natasha Lyonne as Woman in Hair Salon
- Jamie Chung as Young Grandma
- Simu Liu as Garbage Boy
- Harry Shum Jr. as Doc Hottie
- Makeda Declet as Chenise
- Bella Heathcote as Joey
- David Krumholtz as Jerry Harrison

==== Season 2 ====
- Chloe Fineman as Greta
- Alan Kim as Young Wally
- Lauren Ash as Woman at Poolside
- Margaret Cho as Mistress Jupiter
- Dorothi Fox as Laurie
- Haley Joel Osment as Amos

==== Season 3 ====
- Gina Gershon as Toe / Dr. Emily Cohen
- Ken Jeong as Dave Lee
- Frankie Muniz as Shawn
- Michael Bolton as Kevin
- Scott Adsit as Constantine
- Jo Koy as the voice of Bob
- Jai Rodriguez as Detective Johnson
- Lea DeLaria as Alfur the Elf
- Adrian Martinez as Darryl
- Noah Robbins as Jaxon
- Janeane Garofalo as Carol
- Ronny Chieng as Arthur

== Episodes ==
Season	Episodes	Originally released	
Season	Episodes	First released	Last released
1	10	January 20, 2020	March 25, 2020
2	10	August 18, 2021	October 13, 2021
3	7	April 26, 2023	June 7, 2023

=== Season 1 (2020) ===
No. overall	No. in season	Title	Directed by	Written by	Original release date	U.S. viewers (millions)
1	1	"Pilot"	Lucia Aniello	Awkwafina & Teresa Hsiao	January 22, 2020	0.489
2	2	"Atlantic City"	Jamie Babbit	Cherry Chevapravatdumrong	January 29, 2020	0.435
Nora and her grandmother travel to Atlantic City for a day. Nora learns how to play blackjack, and becomes a big winner because she is counting cards. Nora's grandmother and her Chinese friends get into a disagreement with a senior citizen Korean group of women for access to an outlet to charge their equipment.
3	3	"Savage Valley"	Jamie Babbit	Emily Goldwyn	February 5, 2020	0.399
4	4	"Paperwork"	Natasha Lyonne	Awkwafina & Teresa Hsiao	February 12, 2020	0.373
5	5	"Not Today"	Steven Tsuchida	Sarah Peters	February 19, 2020	0.346
After getting into an argument with her Dad, Nora decides to go to a hair salon and get her hair dyed blonde, which leads to disastrous results. Nora is jealous of her successful cousin, who comes back to live in New York and has raised $15 million for the company he is starting. Nora's Dad feels bad about yelling at Nora, and goes to a meeting of single parents.
6	6	"Vagarina"	Anu Valia	Samantha Riley	January 20, 2020 (Note: A sneak peek of the show's sixth episode aired on January 20, 2020, before the premiere of the pilot in its regular timeslot. The episode later re-aired on February 26, 2020.)	0.338
Nora's Aunt Sandra comes to pay a visit, and drops off her son with them for a couple of days. During a sugar rush, Nora's cousin accidentally hits Nora in the vagina, causing her to queef on a regular basis. When Nora is visiting Rat Lung, the rapper who is her friend's boyfriend, she queefs, and he persuades her to let him sample her queef for his songs.
7	7	"Grandma Loves Nora"	Anu Valia	Karey Dornetto	March 4, 2020	0.347
Nora feels threatened by Edmund spending so much time with their Grandma. Edmund later reveals to Nora that he doesn't have a good idea for an app, and he's meeting with investors the next day. Nora brainstorms a few ideas for him, and they both meet with Edmund's investors. Wally joins Instagram to try to meet women.
8	8	"Grandma & Chill"	Daniel Scheinert & Daniel Kwan	Kyle Lau	March 11, 2020	0.384
9	9	"Launch Party"	Lucia Aniello	Cherry Chevapravatdumrong	March 18, 2020	0.451
10	10	"China"	Lucia Aniello	Awkwafina & Teresa Hsiao	March 25, 2020	0.442
Nora arrives in Beijing, while Edmund is still stuck in America. Nora is given an assistant by the company named Grace, who is overly familiar with Nora. Grandma nurses a pigeon back to health that flew into her home. Grace is about to be arrested for drug possession at a bar, but Nora takes the blame for her, causing Nora to be sent back to Queens.

=== Season 2 (2021) ===
No. overall	No. in season	Title	Directed by	Written by	Original release date	U.S. viewers (millions)
11	1	"Never too Old"	Steven Tsuchida	Kyle Lau	August 18, 2021	0.343
12	2	"Stop! Nora Time"	Laura Murphy	Jess Dweck	August 18, 2021	0.318
13	3	"Charlie's Angels"	Laura Murphy	Hayley Adams & Joellen Redlingshafer	August 25, 2021	0.233
14	4	"Edmund's Back"	Laura Murphy	Andrew Law	September 1, 2021	0.344
15	5	"Don't F**k with Grandmas"	Andrew McCarthy	Cherry Chevapravatdumrong	September 8, 2021	0.358
Grandma rallies up all of the elderly people who are being conned of their money. They all meet the scammer who happens to be a timid man.
16	6	"Nora Meets Brenda"	Bill Benz	Samantha Riley	September 15, 2021	0.285
17	7	"Tales from the Blackout"	BD Wong	Awkwafina & Teresa Hsiao	September 22, 2021	0.218
18	8	"Shadow Acting"	Andrew McCarthy	Karey Dornetto	September 29, 2021	0.329
19	9	"The Simple Life"	Jordan Kim	Ria Sardana	October 6, 2021	0.248
Nora takes Edmund to Los Angeles. She leaves and gets stranded in New Mexico. There, she finds the cult, the Union of the Seven Moons which her Aunt Sandra belongs to. Grandma teaches Brenda some family secrets.
20	10	"Home"	Jordan Kim	Teresa Hsiao	October 13, 2021	0.329

=== Season 3 (2023) ===
No. overall	No. in season	Title	Directed by	Written by	Original release date	U.S. viewers (millions)
21	1	"Nightmares"	Awkwafina	Teresa Hsiao	April 26, 2023	0.184
Nora begins to have a bizarre nightmare. Grandma goes to a friend's funeral. Wally causes problems at work which leads to his termination. He tries to confess this to Brenda but she thinks that it is a proposal.
22	2	"Too Hot to Survive"	Laura Murphy	Cherry Chevapravatdumrong	May 3, 2023	0.181
In order to prove Wally wrong about making a large sum of money in little time, Nora goes on a reality-based TV show in a spoof of Jersey Shore. Meanwhile, Wally is still keeping his secret about his job termination by helping Grandma. Co-starring Ken Jeong as Dave Lee
23	3	"Love & Order"	Bill Benz	Kyle Lau	May 10, 2023	0.136
24	4	"þetta reddast"	Jordan Kim	Cherry Chevapravatdumrong	May 17, 2023	0.267
25	5	"Bad Grandma"	Bill Benz	Kyle Lau	May 24, 2023	0.302
26	6	"Car Fished"	Laura Murphy	Teresa Hsiao	May 31, 2023	0.244
27	7	"Nora is Awkwafina from Queens"	Jordan Kim	Awkwafina & Teresa Hsiao	June 7, 2023	0.252

== Production ==
=== Development ===
On April 17, 2018, it was announced that Comedy Central had given the production a pilot order. The episode was written by Awkwafina and Teresa Hsiao. Executive producers were set to include Awkwafina, Karey Dornetto, Peter Principato, and Itay Reiss. Dornetto was also expected to serve as showrunner and Hsiao as a co-executive producer. Production companies involved with the pilot were expected to include Principato-Young Entertainment, later rebranded as Artists First.

On November 29, 2018, it was announced that Comedy Central had given the production a series order for a first season consisting of ten episodes. Awkwafina, Hsiao, and Dornetto were set to write for the series and Lucia Aniello was expected to direct and executive produce. Ahead of the series premiere, on January 14, 2020, it was reported that Comedy Central renewed the series for a second season. On May 12, 2022, Comedy Central renewed the series for a third season.

=== Casting ===
Alongside the pilot order announcement, it was confirmed that Awkwafina would star in the production. Concurrent with the series order, it was announced that BD Wong and Lori Tan Chinn would star in the series. In July 2019, Chrissie Fit and Jonathan Park joined the cast in recurring roles. On August 14, 2019, Jennifer Esposito was cast in a recurring capacity. On March 24, 2021, Alan Kim was cast in a guest starring role for the second season.

=== Filming ===
Principal photography for the pilot began on July 20, 2018, in Queens, New York City, New York. In the last episode of season one, part of the story's background is set in Beijing, China, but it was actually filmed at Taoyuan International Airport and in Taipei, Taiwan.

For episode three of season one, filming partially took place in Iceland.

== Release ==
The series premiered on January 22, 2020, on Comedy Central. In August 2020, it was announced that the series would be available on HBO Max, with the second season airing on the service after its first-run broadcast on Comedy Central. The trailer for the second season was released on July 22, 2021. The second season premiered on August 18, 2021. The third season premiered on April 26, 2023.

== Reception ==
=== Critical response ===
On Rotten Tomatoes, the first season holds an approval rating of 81% with an average rating of 6.9/10, based on 31 reviews. The site's critics consensus reads: "Nora From Queens showcases Awkwafina's charming brashness and surrounds her with an equally delightful cast—especially scene stealer Lori Tan Chinn—but it could stand to walk a less familiar comedic beat." On Metacritic, it has a weighted average score of 66 out of 100, based on 19 critics, indicating "generally favorable reviews".

Linda Holmes of NPR wrote: "There's a lot of pressure on creators of color to be groundbreaking — to sell their shows as both good and somehow ethically nutritious. Awkwafina's place in that calculus is complicated by legitimate questions about her own treatment of cultural traditions she's not part of. But it's also fair to evaluate Awkwafina Is Nora from Queens as an entry in a line of single-camera comedy series amplifying one distinctive sensibility (Insecure, Louie, Chewing Gum, Broad City, even Portlandia). And as part of that line, it holds up well." According to IMDb, "Grandma and Chill" is the highest-rated episode of season one, followed by the season finale, "China".

=== Ratings ===
The series premiere obtained 0.49 million viewers, making it the highest rated season one premiere for Comedy Central since 2017. Several days later, Comedy Central announced that Awkwafina Is Nora from Queens amassed 3.8 million total viewers (2.2 million came from the simulcast and replays of the episode and 1.6 million came from YouTube views). On social media, the series ranked the first in the most social primetime cable comedy of the night with 39,000 social interactions across Facebook, Twitter, and Instagram. The second season of the series saw a 20% increase on rating and 14% increase in share from the Season 1 average.
