= MediaEntity =

2012 French thriller webcomic

- Cover of the 2013 book
- Author(s): Emilie Tarascou and Simon Kansara
- Website: www.mediaentity.net
- Current status/schedule: Completed
- Publisher: Delcourt

MediaEntity is a Turbomedia webcomic created by Emilie Tarascou and Simon Kansara since 2012. The webcomic follows the story of a young man whose social media account suddenly starts generating compromising messages. It features a large amount of free bonus content that fits its paranoid theme. The webcomic was first released in print form in 2013, using augmented reality features.

MediaEntity won the jury prize at La Nuit des Médias 2010.

== Synopsis ==
MediaEntity is a paranoid thriller that follows the story of young trader Éric Magoni, whose account on the fictional social media website MediaEntity starts generating compromising messages on its own. Éric is the first victim of the website's scheme, which goes much deeper than initially apparent. The webcomic explores the loss of control over one's digital identity, posing ethical questions about the future of personal data and the companies that control it.

== Development ==
MediaEntity is the result of a four year long collaboration between visual designer Emilie Tarascou and screenwriter Simon Kansara. The duo based their work on the company Mutation Narrative, which was founded in December 2009 to promote audio-visual creation and publishing. Tarascou and Kansara noted in 2012 that they had enough funds to continue the project for at least five years. The MediaEntity website features a large amount of bonus content which, though not essential for the basic understanding of the webcomic, amplifies the reading experience. Tarascou and Kansara have created two social media accounts, an alternate reality roleplaying game titled MediaEntity: Smoke Screen (which allows players to take on the role of an illegal immigrant in the MediaEntity universe), and an interactive web series titled MediaEntity: Roots.

The first volume of MediaEntity was released in print in August 2013. The seven-page booklet offered its content using augmented reality, which could be accessed using a mobile phone or tablet after downloading a required application. A second volume came out in January 2014.

MediaEntity was rereleased in a new digital form in 2018, with a new interactive treasure hunt. This time, readers were encouraged to explore an augmented reality mystery through PDF-files hidden within thumbnails, and Morse code messages posted on social media.
