= Rewriting Earth =

Charity that creates media to fight the loss of biodiversity

- Formation: June 2021
- Type: Charity
- Founder: Paul Goodenough
- Website: rewriting.earth

Rewriting Earth (formerly Rewriting Extinction) is a charity that raises awareness for both the climate and the biodiversity crisis through comics, videos and other media. It originally ran as a 12-month charitable campaign, where the money was donated to seven specific projects that tackled biodiversity issues with the goal of solving them within the twelve months of the campaign. After the success of the campaign, Rewriting Earth formed a charity that continues to make media focused on climate change and the biodiversity crisis.

== Project ==
Rewriting Extinction was founded by Emmy nominated writer and producer Paul Goodenough in 2019 and the campaign was officially launched in June 2021. It is targeting the wider population with comics, videos and the help of over 300 storytellers and celebrities such as Cara Delevingne, Richard Curtis, Ricky Gervais and Taika Waititi. The campaign is accompanied by the book The Most Important Comic Book on Earth: Stories to Save the World which was released on October 28, 2021, by DK. It includes 120 stories and comics about the climate and the biodiversity crisis from over 300 contributors including leading environmentalists, artists, authors, actors, filmmakers, musicians, drag performers and more. Although the book is not targeted at children, it was listed amongst the best books of 2021 for children by the Sunday Times.

Some comics from the book are being published on social media on an ongoing basis and translated into multiple languages. Since the release, additional comic strips are being created and released on a regular basis. Authors include The Perry Bible Fellowship, Joel Pett, Drew Sheneman and War and Peas.

A variety of organizations support the campaign's work, including Global Rewilding Alliance, Make My Money Matter, Born Free Foundation and Sea Shepherd.

In addition to social media, the comics are also featured on Webtoon and in a virtual gallery by Google Arts & Culture.

With the money raised, the campaign helped the World Land Trust to purchase the Laguna Grande Reserve in Guatemala.

== Creators behind The Most Important Comic Book on Earth ==
The stories in the book were created by comic artists in a collaboration with celebrities and environmental activists, including:

- Steve Backshall
- Cliff Chiang
- Richard Curtis
- Cara Delevingne
- Judi Dench
- Peter Gabriel
- Ricky Gervais
- Jane Goodall
- Lenny Henry
- Robert Kirkman
- Alan Moore
- Moses Brings Plenty
- Luisa Neubauer
- Chris Packham
- Yoko Ono
- Scott Snyder
- Roger Stern
- Taika Waititi
- War and Peas
