= California Dreamin': Cass Elliot Before The Mamas & the Papas =

Biography of singer Cass Elliot rendered as graphic novel

- Author: Pénélope Bagieu
- Translator: Nanette McGuinness
- Illustrator: Pénélope Bagieu
- Language: French
- Subject: Cass Elliot
- Published: 2015
- Publisher: Gallimard, First Second Books
- Publication place: France
- English publication date: 2017
- Media type: Print
- ISBN: 9781626725461

California Dreamin’: Cass Elliot Before The Mamas & the Papas is a graphic novel written and illustrated by Pénélope Bagieu which highlights the early years of late singer Cass Elliot. It was initially published in French during 2015 by Gallimard. The American edition was translated by Nanette McGuinness and published two years later by First Second Books. The subtitle was added to the American 2017 version. In 2018 it won the Harvey Award of Best European Book.

== Background ==
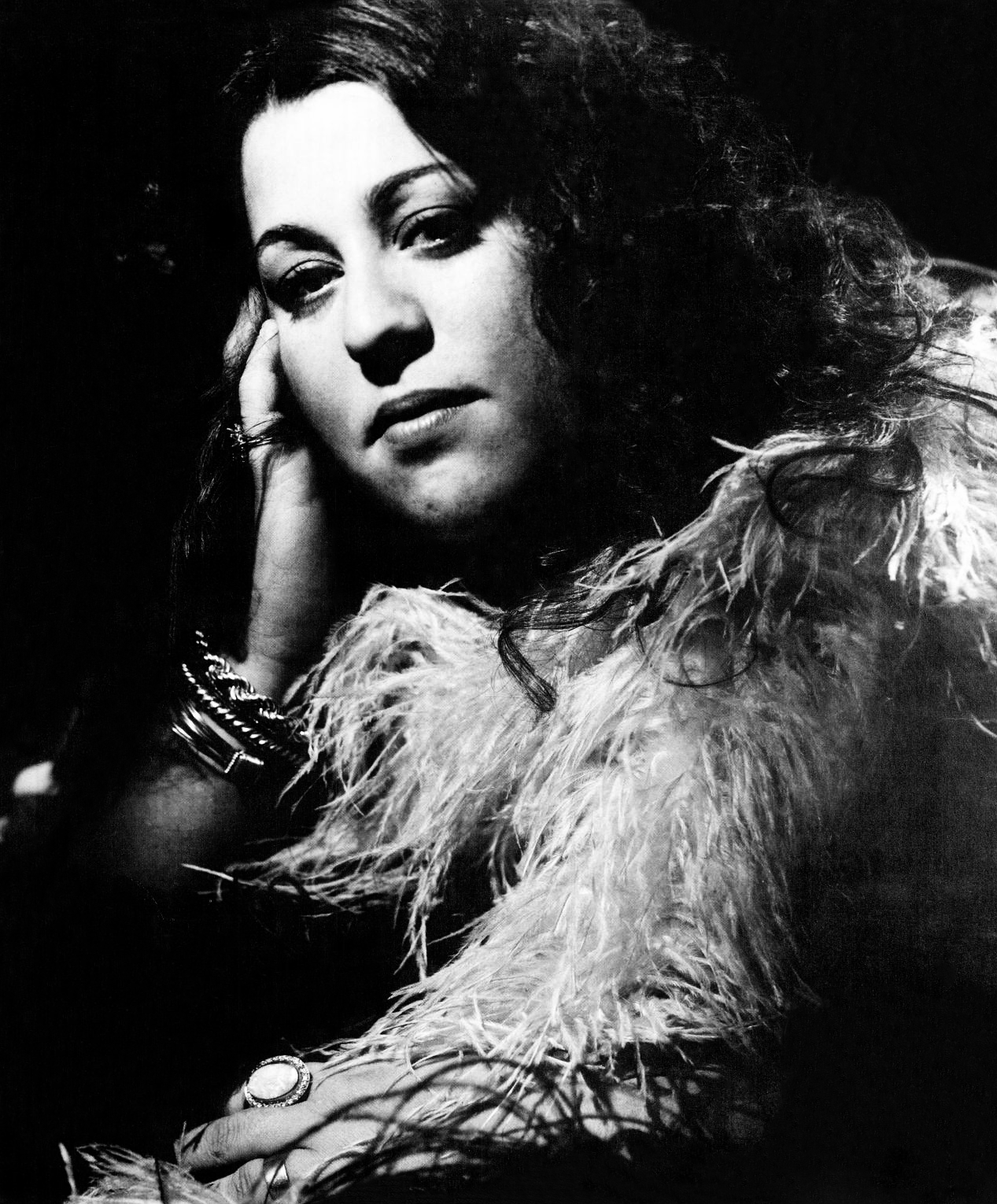
Later singer, Cass Elliot

As a child, Bagieu looked up to Cass Elliot as a role model which inspired the novel to be made. In an interview with the School Library Journal she noted that "I noticed that every time I was telling a friend about her, her life, her music, I really made a point of trying to listen to her more carefully, to dig in to her amazing story, and to look further than just “Mama Cass.” And I could go on for hours, which is usually a good sign for me that I should make a book (and stop annoying my friends)." She further stated that she chose to focus on Cass rather than the band as she "wasn’t that interested in her singing biography and her career" and that the "only part of the band that I was interested in was their twisted relationship, the vaudeville, the obstacles John Philips put on her, her romantic interest in Denny and her friendship with Michelle."

== Synopsis ==
The novel consists of eighteen chapters and a prologue; most parts have been named after a person in Cass’ life. California Dreamin’ starts with Cass’ birth and ends around 1965, before Cass’ death. Towards the back of the book, there is a playlist of eight songs Cass sings in, which Bagieu recommends. As a biography, the novel is loosely historical and formed out of four main sources: Dream a Little Dream of Me: The Life of “Mama” Cass Elliot by Eddi Fiegel, Go Where You Wanna Go: The Oral History of the Mamas and the Papas by Matthew Greenwood, Make Your Own Kind of Music: A Career Retrospective of Cass Elliot by Jon Johnson, and California Dreamin’ by Michelle Phillips.

== Illustration ==
The illustrations spanning over 250 pages were all created using pencil, ink, and water. A majority of the work is pencil, with only complementary additions being made with the ink and water. Except for the cover art, the book is entirely in black and white, something she chose because the book spans multiple eras that have different colors associated with them such as "something psychedelic and pop colors for the sixties and very stern, dark colors for the forties". Per Baglieu, the black and white color scheme allowed the book to feel more like a whole story and also gave her the opportunity to work with pencils.

== Reception ==
In his review for the book in The Washington Post Michael Cavna wrote that Bagieu's "creative result is less about the Mamas and the Papas and more about how one irrepressible, winning young woman rises from her Baltimore roots by reaching for wherever her dreaming points her." The Jewish Book Council also praised the book alongside Paste magazine, who noted that Bagieu "works in pencils, with no color, but the graphic novel doesn’t need bright hues to roil with life."
