= Nathan W. Pyle =

American writer and cartoonist (born 1982)

Nathan W. Pyle (born 1982) is an American cartoonist and writer living in New York City. He is the creator of the popular webcomic Strange Planet, which depicts a planet of blue beings discussing banal human experiences in humorously technical language. He has had multiple books reach The New York Times Best Seller list.

== Background and first books ==
Pyle was born in 1982. He grew up in Kettering, Ohio, and graduated from Dayton Christian High School. He studied theology in college and taught high school theology for two years before moving to New York in 2008 to pursue creative work.

He worked in television production and also posted T-shirt designs to Threadless, with one of his designs appearing on the TV show Community. His work gained wide attention in 2013 when he posted a series of animated gifs to the website Reddit describing his observations of life in New York City. The animations went viral, attracting the attention of BuzzFeed, which offered him a job, and HarperCollins, which in 2014 published his comics in book form in NYC Basic Tips and Etiquette. This book made The New York Times Best Seller's Travel list. Pyle also published the book 99 Stories I Could Tell: A Doodlebook To Help You Create in 2018. He married in 2018.

== Strange Planet series ==
Pyle launched his webcomic Strange Planet in February 2019. It follows a planet of blue beings without gender or race who have human traditions and behaviors but discuss them in highly technical terminology, such as saying "I crave star damage" instead of "I want to get a sun tan." The beings are big eyed, bright blue creatures, often called aliens, though Pyle does not use the term 'alien', saying that the comics take place on their home planet and the readers are the visitors. Pyle says that he was inspired to create the series after he and his wife, preparing to host guests, began hiding their possessions to make their small apartment appear as clean as possible. Pyle says that the comic looks at the wonderful complexity humans have created.

The webcomic quickly gained a large following on Instagram; it had 250,000 followers within 3 weeks, and by May had over 2 million followers. As of December 2020 it had 6 million followers. A book version, also called Strange Planet, was released in November 2019 and entered multiple bestseller lists including a number one spot on a New York Times bestseller list and the Publishers Weekly bestseller list for hardcover fiction. A second book, Stranger Planet, was released in 2020.

Hasbro has produced a card game based on the comic called Sweet Existence, with illustrations by Pyle. In June 2021, it was announced that Apple TV+ had given the production a series order to an animated television adaptation of the comics. The series was released on August 9, 2023. The series was produced by ShadowMachine with Dan Harmon and Pyle as executive producers.

== Political views ==
In April 2019, a Twitter post by Pyle from 2017 resurfaced regarding the pro-life rally March For Life. According to some reporters, Pyle's tweet expressed support for, or defended, March For Life. The tweet caused many pro-choice fans to turn against Strange Planet and its creator, in a controversy described by at least one outlet as an example of the Milkshake Duck phenomenon.

Pyle released a statement shortly afterwards which did not mention abortion, but said that he and his wife "have private beliefs as they pertain to our Christian faith. We believe separation of church and state is crucial to our nation flourishing." He also stated they voted for the Democratic Party, and were "troubled by what the Republican Party has become and [did] not want to be associated with it."

== Reception ==
=== Readership figures ===
As of October 2025, Instagram reported that his personal account had 559.000 followers and the account for Strange Planet had 6.2 million followers. He also has significant follower numbers on Facebook and X.

=== Reviews ===
In an article on The Verge, writer Dami Lee said, "It's clear why Strange Planet resonates with people... everybody can project themselves onto them. They navigate universal situations, shedding light on human behavior that no one understands the reason behind... Scientists couldn't engineer a more shareable webcomic if they tried." The comic's "amusing alien outsider" trope has been compared to that of 3rd Rock from the Sun and Coneheads, and has been described as a modern rendering of the 1907 science-fiction newspaper strip Mr. Skygack, from Mars.

At an on-stage interview, Jonathan Kunz, co-creator of War and Peas, disclosed that he is friends with Pyle and said, "He has an amazing mind, it's beautiful. The way he thinks about the world and writes jokes is just incredible."

== Bibliography ==
- NYC Basic Tips and Etiquette (2014, William Morrow Paperbacks)
- 99 Stories I Could Tell: A Doodlebook To Help You Create (2018, Morrow Gift)
- Strange Planet (2019)
- Stranger Planet (2020)
