= Michael Buonauro =

American webcomic artist and author (1979–2004)

- Born: Michael Buonauro; May 27, 1979; Fort Lauderdale, Florida
- Died: May 28, 2004 (aged 25)
- Known for: Webcomics
- Notable work: Marvelous Bob

Michael A. Buonauro (May 27, 1979 – May 28, 2004) was an American webcomic artist, and author. Best known for his webcomic Marvelous Bob, Buonauro had co-created various other webcomics in collaboration with Jeff Lofvers.

Michael Buonauro committed suicide in 2004. His parents established the Michael Buonauro Foundation in response, a charity organization which seeks to fund a suicide awareness program.

== Works ==
Buonauro's best known work was Marvelous Bob, a web-published story based on the conventions of comic book superheroes, but in a distinctively realist, postmodern style. The title character is an individual with the powers of a superhero, but is an antihero in many ways: for instance, unlike most "heroes", he has no scruples about killing when necessary.

Buonauro was also co-creator of the webcomics Dr. Lobster, Gamer Hotties, and Wrench Farm, all of which were joint projects with his friend Jeff Lofvers.

== Death and legacy ==
He committed suicide the day after his 25th birthday. His parents have established the Michael Buonauro Foundation which has funded the Signs Of Suicide program (SOS). The SOS program was presented to more than 55,000 students in all the high schools in Orange County, Florida. The SOS program seeks to promote suicide awareness and prevention through education.

Michael's parents are proud to announce that Marvelous Bob has been published and is available on Amazon! As promised all profits are going to the Michael Buonauro Foundation.
