= Brian Gordon (cartoonist) =

American cartoonist

- Born: 1970 (age 55–56)
- Area: Cartoonist
- Notable works: Fowl Language; Frankie Fearless; Chuck & Beans

Brian Gordon (b. c. 1970) is an American cartoonist, and creator of the webcomics Fowl Language, Frankie Fearless, and Chuck & Beans.

== Biography ==
Gordon was raised in Brockton, Massachusetts.

He wanted to be a syndicated comic artist from a young age, with Calvin and Hobbes, Peanuts, The Far Side, and Bloom County being some of the newspaper comic strips that influenced him. (Gordon cites The Oatmeal, Lunarbaboon, We the Robots, Heart and Brain, Sarah's Scribbles, Up and Out, and Owl Turd as some of the webcomics that inspire him more recently.)

Gordon graduated from Massachusetts College of Art and Design. After freelancing for some time, Gordon earned a master's degree from Syracuse University in 1997.

Gordon moved to Kansas for a three-week internship for Hallmark Cards in 1997, which was followed by an offer of employment. Gordon worked as a cartoonist at Hallmark for 18 years.

== Career ==
=== Chuck & Beans ===
While at Hallmark, Gordon maintained a blog on the company's website called Brian's Brain. Gordon used many different cartoon characters on the blog (many of which appeared on Hallmark greeting cards).

Gordon started drawing Chuck & Beans, initially a comic strip about an unnamed rabbit and a dog in their twenties who were obsessed with pop culture and dating. As these characters became increasingly popular, Gordon originally considered naming them "Frank and Beans," but he discovered that name was already being used for a pornography website. When Gordon mentioned the name to his wife, she thought he had said "chucking beans," which gave him the idea to name the characters "Chuck and Beans", and the name was set.

=== Fowl Language ===
In the early 2010s, as Hallmark Cards began to suffer financial troubles, Gordon's friends urged him to create a new comic that he owned. Gordon was also finding it increasingly difficult to write comic strips for characters who were single and in their twenties while he was in a different stage of life. In July 2013, Gordon started a new comic, Fowl Language, as an outlet to vent about parenthood in a way that was edgier than Hallmark Cards would allow. The first comic strip began with four expletives, partly in order to draw a bright line between the new comic and Gordon's more family-friendly work at Hallmark.

With ducks as all of the characters, the comic focuses on the frustrations and failures of parenthood. Rather than pretend that parenthood is easy or a competition, Gordon's cartoons openly depict how raising kids is a struggle filled with both wins and losses. Gordon said he chose to draw the characters as ducks because ducks were one of the few animals he did not draw very often for Hallmark Cards.

Hallmark sent Gordon an email notifying him of his lay off on June 1, 2015. Two hours later, The Huffington Post contacted Gordon asking to publish some of his comics on their website. The comics and accompanying article increased the reach of his work.

Fowl Language quickly became one of the most shared comics on Facebook. Gordon's online popularity led to several offers to publish his comics as a paperback; Andrews McMeel Publishing released Fowl Language: Welcome to Parenting, a compilation of Gordon's comics, on March 22, 2016. In the introduction, Gordon says that every parent is scared and makes it all up as they go along.

== Personal life ==
Gordon lives with his wife and their four children in Westwood, Kansas. Gordon's children inspire the material for Fowl Language.
