= Poorly Drawn Lines =

Webcomic by Reza Farazmand

- Website type: Comics, Webcomic, Blog
- Available in: English
- Creator: Reza Farazmand
- Website: poorlydrawnlines.com
- Launched: 2008; 18 years ago
- Current status: Active

Poorly Drawn Lines (PDL) is a webcomic created by cartoonist Reza Farazmand. It features mostly standalone comic strips that range from just one frame to many, most of which are satirical or absurdist in tone. The topic of each strip varies, with recurring themes including space travel, supernatural occurrences, science fiction, friendship, and existentialism. Most strips are conclusive and able to be read without any previous knowledge of storyline; however, the comic also contains some ongoing story arcs, along with recurring characters such as Ernesto, a green bear who lives in outer space.

== History ==
Farazmand began making comic strips in high school, and created Poorly Drawn Lines while he was a freshman at University of California, San Diego. The strip first appeared in UCSD's college newspaper, The Guardian. Farazmand has drawn the comic full-time since 2013, posting new strips every Monday, Wednesday, and Friday.

In 2014, several Poorly Drawn Lines strips were adapted for five episodes of the Comedy Central animated series TripTank.

Since 2013, Poorly Drawn Lines has been signed with GoComics.

Farazmand's first book, Poorly Drawn Lines: Good Ideas and Amazing Stories was published by Penguin Books' Plume imprint on October 6, 2015. It was ranked no. 5 on the New York Times Best Seller List for the week of October 25, 2015.

In 2021, it was announced that an animated Poorly Drawn Lines cartoon was to be part of the fifth season of FXX's Cake which aired on September 30, 2021.

== Books ==
Compilations and other related books by Farazmand:

- 2015: Poorly Drawn Lines: Good Ideas and Amazing Stories (Plume)
- 2017: Comics for a Strange World: A Book of Poorly Drawn Lines (Plume)
- 2019: Poorlier Drawn Lines (Plume)
- 2020: City Monster (Plume)
- 2024: Hope It All Works Out!: A Poorly Drawn Lines Collection (Andrews McMeel Publishing)
