= Guilded Age =

Fantasy webcomic

- The title page cover to Guilded Age featuring all main characters past and present.
- Author(s): T Campbell, Erica Henderson & Phil Kahn
- Website: guildedage.net
- Current status/schedule: MWF
- Launch date: September 4, 2009
- End date: June 8, 2018
- Genre(s): Fantasy

Guilded Age is a 2009 fantasy webcomic about five heroes who have come together to work for a common goal: three squares and a warm bed. Its narrative presents a conflict between warring coalitions based on centuries-old feuds, but the writers claim they intend to "try to focus on what's important." The webcomic is a collaboration among T Campbell, Erica Henderson, and Phil Kahn. T Campbell, the co-writer, has described Guilded Age as a "fantasy dramedy-adventure" Henderson stepped down as the primary artist of the strip at the end of November 2010, with art duties being taken over by John Waltrip.

The title of the webcomic is a portmanteau of the "Gilded Age", the post-Civil War era in US history, and guilds, the clubs of players within RPGs. While the fantasy elements suggest the European Middle Ages, Guilded Age also takes place in the dawn of the Industrial Age and the American Wild West. The influence of role-playing games, and World of Warcraft in particular, makes Guilded Age a regular feature on Joystiq's "Sunday Morning Funnies."

Part of the Love Shack and Comicbox networks, Guilded Age has supplied a cover to the online magazine Comixtalk, and has been published in book format.

== Main cast ==
Together, the main characters form the Gastonian Peacemakers. Charged with representing Gastonian interests through establishing peaceful relations with foreign powers, their mandate also includes the use of violence to solve the problems of potential allies.

=== Byron Hackenslasher ===
— Human Berserker
Said to be the only survivor of the War That Felled Battleshire, Byron The Berserker is just about the most professional and genial sort a dual-axe wielding killing machine could be. His good head for tactics and strong sense of loyalty make him the de facto ‘quarterback’ for the group. Byron is normally very cool-headed, but his berserking is a growing danger to himself and his comrades. His axes are named Bayen and Brayen, named for childhood friends, and he seems to be quite fond of them.

=== Syr’Nj ===
— Wood Elf Field Medic
As a Wood Elf, Syr’Nj feels a close connection with nature and the world around her. As an ambitious young prodigy, she has a deep curiosity and applicable knowledge of the cutting edge in technology. That connection and curiosity, combined with a can-do attitude, have drawn her out from her own people to explore a larger, often xenophobic world. She once served as a medic in the Gastonian military, and is now Byron's de facto second-in-command. She has a tattoo on her left arm which seems to indicate royal blood.

=== Frigg Akerfeldt ===
— Human Crusader
A former unwilling acolyte of the Sisterhood of the Bloodshot Eyeball, Frigg rebelled against their tyrannical rule and struck out on her own for a life of adventure and ultra-violence. Frigg is crude, impulsive, and shows little respect for almost anyone.

=== Gravedust Deserthammer ===
— Dwarf Mystic
Gravedust is the last of the Dwarven Mystics, a sect of shamans who communicate with the souls of the dead. He traveled to Gastonia in order to understand humans, and find a way that Dwarves and Humans can live together in peace. In spite of his mission, Gravedust is mistrustful of most humans, though his interactions with Byron have improved his attitudes towards them somewhat. Gravedust is stoic, occasionally grumpy, and usually keeps to himself.

=== Bandit Keynes ===
— Gnome Thief
Bandit is a cunning and agile thief who eventually replaced Payet Best as the group's fifth member. Little is known about Bandit's background, since she is distrustful of strangers. She claims to only serve her own self-interest, but has proven to be a loyal member of the team.

== Other cast ==
=== Payet Best ===
— Elf Virtuoso
A prophesied hero of legend (or so he believes), Best is a gifted and intelligent Warrior Musician with a natural talent for both combat and charming a crowd. And he takes great lengths to ensure that you know that very well. His ego has made his membership with the group very volatile, and he was last seen vanishing into a vortex.

=== Field Marshal Ardaic ===
— Human 'Mission control'
Following the team's first mission rescuing kidnapped children from aspirational skypirates, he recruited them as a band of trouble shooters and emissaries for Gastonia. Although he is generally satisfied with the ends they achieve, the means by which they do so sometimes leave him less than impressed.

=== Big Boss Harky ===
— Troll Warchief
The Troll leader of the 'World's Rebellion' or 'Savage Races', Harky is a chosen one of the god Tectonicus and has unparallelled regenerative abilities. He is a gifted warrior with a spear, but his true talent lies in leadership and inspiration. He has taken on a protege in the form of Penk the drummer.

== Setting ==
The story takes place in Gastonia, a society that is considered the centre of human (and gnomish) culture on the continent of Arkerra. Their recent period of expansion was triggered by events surrounding the Battle of the Solates Mountains.

=== Culture ===
Gastonian culture is primarily human, although the long-standing alliance with the gnomes has led to many technological wonders being accepted into everyday Gastonian life. The less prevalent non-savage races also have an impact, but their contributions, such as the wood-elf groves, are often met with distrust from the overwhelmingly human population.

Savage culture is much more tribal in nature, with displays of martial skill being heavily influential, and percussion instruments playing a large part in both the social and military dynamics of the rebellion. The races remain, for the most part, informally segregated, although their equivalent of the peacemakers consists of a member of each race.

=== Politics ===
Gastonia is ruled by the Parliament of Nine Houses, each of which controls an essential commodity (agriculture, mining, technology, etc.); this includes the Church. The House of Houses was constructed to contain the activities of Parliament, as Gastonians believe society should be directed by those who produce. Currently, Gastonia is trying to walk the line between not being feared enough (in which case they will be attacked) and being feared too much (in which case they will be attacked by everything their enemies can throw at them); keeping their airship development program secret until it's viable falls into the second category. The Peacemakers are a band of Gastonian races working together as a special operations unit.

Savage leadership is similarly a council of a representative from each race, with the notable exception of the Land Sharks, who cannot be trusted to remain focused without their leaders directly present ("My brothers follow only the loudest voice, and that is only me when I am near."). The representatives serve to advise and suggest, but ultimately all decisions fall to Harky. Recently, a band of Savage adventurers, dubbed the champions, has been put together, and serves as both a military unit and a show of unity for the races.

=== Religion ===
The dominant Human religious faith, that of 'the Eternally Bloodshot Eye' is presided over by the masked Priestlord Gigundus; people who follow other faiths are not well received. He claims that his word is the blood that flows through the world and washes out its disobedience. The status of this faith is uncertain, following the dissolution of its most important temple (see "Sisterhood of the Bloodshot Eyeball," below.)

The Wood Elves revere their founder, the great Druid Graiya, in a religious fashion.

Trolls and certain other Savage Races worship the magma god Tectonicus, who is shown to be a very real presence in Arkerra, naming and empowering the two troll champions, Harky and Penk.

The Savasi previously had a mysterious caste of spiritual warriors called 'Mystics', but under Iver's influence, have become mostly secular, killing off all mystics except Gravedust.

==== Sisterhood of the Bloodshot Eyeball ====
They believe themselves to be the fist of an angry god, though others describe them as thugs hiding behind a facade of righteousness. Their belief in their divine duty fuels their ambitions, strengthens their resolve and binds them together into a formidable fighting force. Dissolved following the disappearance of Gigundus.

==== Order of the Countless Limbs ====
A human terrorist organization that operates within Gastonia. Described as a cult.

=== Technology ===
Gastonia appears to have entered an Age of Reason and is developing technology to replace the influence of magic. Though combat is still predominantly melee-weapon based, guns and explosives exist and are used by certain technologically adept factions. Airships are on the cusp of becoming reality.

== Races ==
=== Humans ===
By far the most populous race, Humans are the de facto rulers of Gastonia, having a huge majority in the House of Houses, and controlling the armed forces. Humans have little natural Magick, and are not especially adept at technology, but make skilled fighters, and are the major trade power in Arkerra, controlling as they do Gastonia. Notable Humans include Byron the Berserker, Frigg, Field Marshal Ardaic, and many others.

=== Dwarves ===
Calling themselves the Savasi, the dwarves are thought of as master warriors, nearly unrivaled in combat and ruthless beyond reasoning, traits encouraged as a defence mechanism against the depredations of others. They suffered a significant defeat during the Battle of the Solates Mountains, still seeking restitution from Gastonia for having been forced from their ancestral homes of the Mountains into the Desert, and to that end toy with forming an alliance with the so-called Savage Races. Notable dwarves include Gravedust and Iver.

=== Elves ===
Elves claim to be the oldest race on Ankerra and there is evidence for their claim. They are found in — and have adapted to — a number of different environments.

==== Sky Elves ====
The world's most prominent magic users, who rely on it almost exclusively. They reside in the floating city of Asallah En-Qu'Lara, which has allowed them to rise above the petty squabbles of the world below and achieve political neutrality. Although they could bombard the land below with an endless array of lightning bolts and fireballs, this threat is abated by the Sky Elves being the most peaceful culture in Arkerran history, but they are not without their own internal difficulties. The Sky Elves conjure all of their natural resources, causing some internal debate over where the conjured goods are coming from, and the moral justifications for said acts. Notable Sky Elves include Canghem, the Sky Elf house representative.

==== Wood Elves ====
Wood Elves are an isolated race of green-skinned, semi-plant Elves, who consider themselves closer to the trees of their home forests than the humans of Gastonia. Due to their willowy nature, most Wood Elves make poor fighters, but their mastery of nature make them excellent herbalists and their great libraries make the Wood Elves scholarly giants. Notable Wood Elves include Syr'nj, a peacemaker.

==== Half Elves ====
This term encompasses both half-Elf half-Human offspring, who typically retain some magic, and Elves who by breeding have lost their magic altogether (colloquially known as Shit Elves). Both races undergo discrimination from both Humans and Elves. Notable hybrids include E-merl the peacemaker and notable Shit Elves include Payet Best, a part-time Peacemaker

=== Gnomes ===
A small and inquisitive race, resembling diminutive humans with pointed ears. They operate the Academy of Arts & Sciences in the Gastonian capitol and describe themselves as being the ones responsible for the nation's technological progress, but even so they still suffer from the casual speciesism of humans who consider them the best of the rest, rather than equals. Notable Gnomes include Bandit keynes, a peacemaker, and Dean Reynolds, a scientist.

Savage Races

=== Trolls ===
Large, intelligent and with extraordinary healing abilities, they appear to be at the forefront of efforts to unite the so-called Savage Races into a unified entity that may pose a threat to Gastonia. Practice slavery, utilising other species such as orcs. Notable Trolls include Big Boss Harky and Penk, his herald.

=== Avians ===
Avians are a race of bird-creatures, shown to be intelligent, fast and agile. Avians alone amongst the Savage Races have the ear of Big Boss Harky, due to their intelligent leader.

=== Gnolls ===
A savage race of Canine Humanoids, the gnolls (also sometimes known as 'the fuzzy people') have a tribal societal structure, with shamanistic leaders and champions elected by wrestling tournaments. Notable Gnolls include Auraugu, champion wrestler.

=== Land Sharks ===
A race of humanoid, landwalking sharks, the Land Sharks are amongst the least intelligent of the races, speaking in simple language and without any clear social structure. The size of a Land Shark seems directly proportional to its intelligence, with the largest, Hammerhead being able to speak normally and command his brethren.

=== Orcs ===
Orcs are considered the least of the Savage races, overlooked by the Gastonians and used as slave labour by the World's rebellion. Despite this, Orcs are shown to have at least a simple tribal society, and their bulk makes for strong workers, and potentially, fighters.

=== Goblins ===
A green and warty-skinned race of humanoids, Goblins are comparable to the gnomes in that they are renowned for tinkering, although theirs is generally thought to be of shoddy workmanship. Notable Goblins include Goblaurence, a champion tinkerer.
