= Ctrl+Alt+Del (webcomic) =

Webcomic and animated series

- Author: Tim Buckley
- Website: cad-comic.com
- Current status/schedule: Updates every Monday and Friday; Monday, Wednesday and Friday on Patreon
- Genre(s): Video game, comedy-drama

Ctrl+Alt+Del (CAD) is a gaming-related webcomic and animated series written by Tim Buckley. The name of the comic refers to the Windows command Control-Alt-Delete. Premiering on October 23, 2002, the comic's focus has gradually shifted away from single strip gags towards longer story arcs and greater continuity through the use of video game references. The comic is updated every Monday and Friday.

Ctrl+Alt+Del has provided Buckley with enough income to make a living, placing it in a small group of web comics that receive full-time devotion from their artist. Beginning June 2008, a number of smaller, humor-themed batch-released strips entitled "CAD Sillies" began running on the news feeds, although they were soon given their own section on the site. By May 2009, the comic had received 38 million page views and was receiving 1.8 million monthly unique visitors.

== Plot ==
The plot of Ctrl+Alt+Del revolves around Ethan, the protagonist and an over-the-top video game fanatic, and his sarcastic roommate Lucas, who provides an unheeded voice of reason to Ethan's flamboyant actions. Together with Ethan's girlfriend, now wife, Lilah, the three engage in turmoil which the comic storyline conveys through independent gaming-related puns by utilizing well-known game titles, consoles and pop culture references. A psychotic Chef Brian, ninjas, and mysterious out-of-the-blue arrows occasionally appear in the series, adding a note of randomness to the comic.

On November 23, 2012, Tim Buckley, the comics author, announced that the storyline that had been focus of the comic since the very beginning would come to an end. While the current versions of Ethan, Lucas, Lilah, Scott, and other characters have ended, he confirmed they would appear in the new comic format, which he referred to as a "Hollywood reboot". The new format will focus on shorter one off comics, mainly around the Player 1, 2, 3, and 4 characters.

On May 3, 2014, the author announced that the storyline with Ethan and Lucas as protagonists would receive a reboot, after a year-and-a-half hiatus. On October 29, 2014, Buckley began posting this new story focusing on Ethan, Lucas, and other characters, with Ethan and Lucas also living a secret life as their superhero alter-egos from the alternate universe Analog and D-Pad comic books. On April 4, 2018, Buckley announced that to make the distinction between the comics storylines clearer, the post-reboot strips featuring Ethan and Lucas would be removed from the Ctrl+Alt+Del archive and placed in a separate archive of its own, labelled Analog and D-Pad.

== Main characters ==
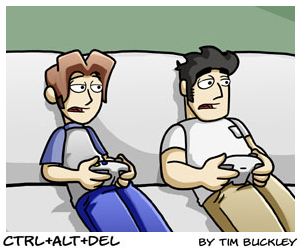
Ethan and Lucas

- Ethan Ryan MacManus – At the start 21-year-old of Irish descent, Ethan is a game fanatic, a recovering EverQuest addict, and an amateur artist. His often nonsensical, off-beat, or even moronic antics are the focus of the comic and the source of many of its plotlines. Ethan owned GameHaven, a video game store. Ethan is also described as the creator of Winter-een-mas, a seven-day celebration of video games, and founder of the Church of Gaming.
- Lucas Davidowicz – Lucas is a year older than Ethan. He is portrayed as more level-headed and down to earth than Ethan. Cynical and sarcastic, although he is more responsible than Ethan, Lucas is something of a slacker, prepared to enjoy a good video game over actual work. Lucas is a programmer and previously worked at a computer store, where he offered technical assistance. More recently, he left to work for Ethan at GameHaven as an assistant manager. Lucas also enjoys Games Workshop's game and universe, Warhammer 40,000.
- Lilah MacManus (née Monroe) – Lilah defied Ethan's preconceived notion that girls (or at least, cute ones) do not play video games, after which they began dating. Lilah is the same age as Ethan and formerly worked as a secretary, but has been competing in tournaments as a professional gamer. She is currently married to Ethan.
- Zeke (short for Ezekiel) – Formerly known as the "Xbot", Zeke is a creation of Ethan's – a sentient, Xbox 360 (Originally Xbox)-based android. It is implied he dreams of taking over the world and eliminating the human race. Ethan eventually builds Zeke a companion, a sentient gynoid named Embla (a reference to the first human woman of Norse Mythology), based on Zeke's own designs. She appears a lot more focused on the "machine revolution" than Zeke.

== CAD Premium ==
In late 2005, the subscription-based CAD Premium section was announced. For a monthly or yearly fee, fans were able to access exclusive "members only" content such as wallpapers, strips and Ctrl+Alt+Del: The Animated Series, which made its debut in February 2006. While CAD Premium was a subscription service, Buckley made it clear that the comic would remain free.

=== Ctrl+Alt+Del: The Animated Series ===
The Animated Series was first announced in a press released from Blind Ferret Entertainment on December 1, 2005, in which the company announced that it would be the company that would develop and distribute the series. The first trailer for the series was also made available on the same date as the press release. The President and CEO of Blind Ferret Entertainment, Randy Waxman, explained that his company was the one that approached Buckley and pitched the concept of creating an animated series based on his webcomic, believing that the characters would translate well to the format of an animated series. Buckley noted that he was approached by other companies before coming into contact with Blind Ferret Entertainment, but he believed that they had the most appropriate combination of skills and experience to make the animated series a reality.

Ryan Sohmer, vice president of Blind Ferret Entertainment and the series's director, claimed that the animated series, which used a traditional 2D style, a professional voice cast, and a lengthy development period, was of sufficient quality to be comparable to that of televised animated series. Waxman admitted that television was ultimately where he hoped the series would end up, claiming that the series appealed to a key demographic that appealed to television network executives. He planned to pitch the episodes of The Animated Series to the network executives as one single pilot episode. The Animated Series made its debut on February 1, 2006, and one four-minute episode was released each following month. In January 2008, it was announced that the Animated Series would return for a second season of 12 episodes, beginning in March of the same year.

== Books ==
=== Collections ===
- Ctrl+Alt+Del Volume One: Insert Coin
- Ctrl+Alt+Del Volume Two: Press Start
- Ctrl+Alt+Del Volume Three: Critical System Failure

These books feature comics found online, along with commentary and bonus material exclusive to the book. On October 14, 2008, Blind Ferret Entertainment announced that it would be re-publishing the Ctrl+Alt+Del collections for sale in stores.

=== Analog and D+Pad ===
Analog and D+Pad is a webcomic created in 2007 written by Tim Buckley with art by Zack Finfrock. It is based on Ctrl+Alt+Del but is set in a parallel universe where Ctrl+Alt+Del main characters Ethan and Lucas are the superheroes Analog and D+Pad. Currently two issues have been published, the second in April 2008. It is ongoing on Buckley's website.

=== Other publishing ===
Ctrl+Alt+Del is a featured comic on Game Revolution. Twelve issues of the City of Heroes comic book featured a comic strip by Ctrl+Alt+Del creator Tim Buckley, called Underwear on the Outside. EQuinox, the official EverQuest 2 magazine, includes Ctrl+Alt+Del comic strips. In 2007, Ctrl+Alt+Del partnered with 2K Games/Firaxis Games to produce a series of comics for Sid Meier's Civilization Daydreams.

== Reception ==
In 2004 and 2005, Ctrl+Alt+Del was nominated for the Web Cartoonists' Choice Awards Outstanding Gaming Comic award, and in 2005 it was nominated for Outstanding Comic. By December 2005, the webcomic was attracting an audience of over 300,000 readers each day, which led to "robust" merchandising sales.

Readers of video game weblog Joystiq voted Buckley's pair of comics that he wrote for the video game Civilization IV: Beyond the Sword's website as the most popular. Ross Miller of Joystiq described the two strips as ones that "played on historical anachronisms and World Wonder rule sets", while noting that he hoped that those who voted in the poll "didn't choose the strip for the Buttsylvania line". Writing for the Chicago Tribune, Levi Buchanan compared Ctrl+Alt+Del to Penny Arcade, describing both as webcomics that take advantage of the lack of censorship on the web by using expletives when they are appropriate, and if they serve the story. Buchanan also considered Ctrl+Alt+Del to be a webcomic with a smaller cast than that of Penny Arcade, noting that the former focuses primarily on the two friends Ethan and Lucas, while the latter comprises a much larger cast.

In 2005, William Kulesa of the Jersey Journal called Penny Arcade and Ctrl+Alt+Del two of the best webcomics, but he felt that the latter was the best overall. He felt that the characters were well-developed, and both had "a sense of fullness often lacked by those found within daily strips. It never fails to draw a chuckle from this reader. Anyone with even a passing familiarity with the land of the nerd will enjoy the strip." He compared the webcomic to Penny Arcade, which he believed required that the reader be more familiar with "nerdy" topics, especially video gaming. Also in 2005, Mariam Asad wrote a piece for the Chronicle Herald showcasing Ctrl+Alt+Del as one of the better webcomics then available, listing several points that the webcomic had that interested her, including its characters, "colourful commentary on recently released games", and storylines that spanned several strips. In 2007, the Knoxville News-Sentinel called Ctrl+Alt+Del a "healthy dose of Web-comic-meets-videogame-playing-geek", describing its drawing style as "cartoonish" and its humor as one that "hilariously lampoons all things gaming through the lives of amateur artist Ethan, programmer Lucas and professional gamer Lilah".

In April 2010, a new character called Abby was introduced as an antagonist to Ethan. A month later, the character's design was found to be copy of a Hector Moran sketch. Buckley redid Abby's clothing and issued an apology in light of this, stating he had mistook the sketch for a photo reference.

Video game journalist Ben "Yahtzee" Croshaw has criticized Ctrl+Alt+Del on several occasions for excessive use of dialogue and slow comic pacing, among other reasons.

=== "Loss" ===
"Loss" by Tim Buckley

In 2008, Buckley published the critically panned strip "Loss", the culmination of a storyline in which Ethan and Lilah were expecting their first child. In the strip Ethan discovers that Lilah's pregnancy had ended in a miscarriage, a significant tonal shift in a comic typically known for humorous situations. In an interview with Joystiq on August 29, 2008, when asked about the comic, Jerry Holkins of Penny Arcade said that "Tim Buckley is the antichrist, and I think [that] storyline was the first horseman of the Apocalypse", while Mike Krahulik stated "I think he's an art criminal." "Loss" later became an internet meme in its own right, with Aryehi Bhushan of Varsity referring to it in 2017 as "infamous" and "the internet's largest meme juggernaut".

In 2010, Shaula Clark of The Boston Phoenix described Buckley as a polarizing figure who created a devoted fanbase for his webcomic while receiving criticism from peers such as Yahtzee and the writers of Penny Arcade. She goes on to attempt to determine why Ctrl+Alt+Del receives the amount of criticism that it has, believing that Buckley's attempt to take a webcomic originally created to showcase strips focusing on Warcraft-related jokes and "the monkey-cheese-ninja random wackiness of manchild main character Ethan" in a new direction by adding "excruciatingly slow, melodramatic, ham-handed plot arcs" helped lead to the negative feedback that the strip has received. Clark points to the "Loss" story arc, which focuses on Lilah's miscarriage, in particular as an example of this. She also regards the holiday invented by Buckley and introduced in Ctrl+Alt+Del, Winter-een-mas, as an "obnoxious gamer holiday" that runs every year from January 25 to 31.

== Bibliography ==
- Buckley, Tim (2004). Insert Coin: Ctrl+Alt+Del Volume 1. Ctrl+Alt+Del Productions. ISBN 0-9764678-0-1.
- Buckley, Tim (2005). Press Start: Ctrl+Alt+Del Volume 2. Ctrl+Alt+Del Productions. ISBN 0-9764678-1-X.
- Buckley, Tim (2006). Critical System Failure: Ctrl+Alt+Del Volume 3. Ctrl+Alt+Del Productions. ISBN 0-9812163-4-X.
- Buckley, Tim (2007). Working as Intended: Ctrl+Alt+Del Volume 4. Ctrl+Alt+Del Productions. ISBN 978-1-9268380-0-7.
