= Tim Buckley (comics) =

American webcomic artist (born 1980 or 1981)

- Born: Timothy William Buckley; April 3, 1981 (age 45) Falmouth, Massachusetts, United States
- Notable works: Ctrl+Alt+Del

Timothy William Buckley (born April 3, 1981) is an American webcomic artist and writer. He is best known for creating the gaming webcomic Ctrl+Alt+Del.

== Career ==
Buckley launched his webcomic Ctrl+Alt+Del in 2002, which mixes video game humor with dramatic storylines. He has mentioned using current video game trends and his personal experiences as inspiration.

Buckley often listens to reader feedback and has used it to guide story changes in the comic, and even allowed readers to vote on how the story should proceed.

A 2008 Ctrl+Alt+Del strip titled "Loss", about the protagonist's fiancée suffering a miscarriage, led to much discussion and derision online over the jarring shift in tone and has become a popular and enduring internet meme.

In January 2003, Buckley introduced a gaming holiday called Winter-een-mas in his comic. Ubisoft celebrated it in 2011 by offering discounts on purchases of digital download games from their web store.

== Bibliography ==
- Ctrl+Alt+Del
- Ctrl+Alt+Del: The Animated Series (2006–2007)
- Starcaster Chronicles – Volume One (2021)
- Analog and D-Pad: a superhero comic which is hosted on the official website of Ctrl+Alt+Del.

== Awards and nominations ==
In 2004 and 2005, Ctrl+Alt+Del was nominated for the Web Cartoonists' Choice Awards Outstanding Gaming Comic award, and in 2005 it was nominated for Outstanding Comic.
