= Webcomics in France =

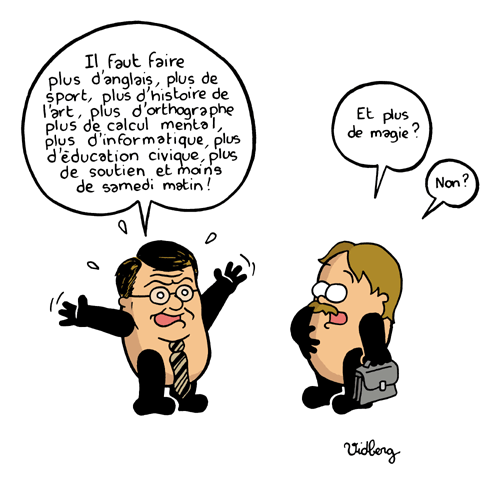
Martin Vidberg posted this political cartoon on his blog in 2008.

Webcomics in France are usually referred to as either blog BD (comic strip blogs) or BD numérique (digital comic strips). Early webcomics in the late 1990s and early 2000s primarily took on the form of personal blogs, where amateur artists told stories through their drawings. The medium rose in popularity in economic viability in the country in the late 2000s and early 2010s. The Turbomedia format, where a webcomic is presented more like a slideshow, was popularized in France in the early 2010s.

== History ==
The distribution of digital comics (BD numérique) in France dates back to 1997, when "interactive comics", a hybrid of video games and animation, were circulated on CD-ROMs. Comic blogs (blog BD) started to appear on the World Wide Web as it gained traction in the late 1990s and early 2000s, generally offering strips and short stories. French webcomics were primarily published on personal blogs, as artists tell stories of their daily lives by putting them in images. For a long time, the blog BD primarily served as a resume for cartoonists. In the mid 2000s, blog BDs started to attract larger and more loyal readerships. In 2008, the "Révélation Blog" prize was established at the Angoulême International Comics Festival, which awards popular blog BD with publishing deals.

== Economy ==
Blogger Gilo described the pre-publishing of comics online, the online sale of digital comics, and crowdfunding as a wide variety of profitable models used in French webcomics. "Paper albums remain unavoidable," he said in an interview with Le Monde in 2011, "and that will last another 5 or 10 years. But little by little, real economic models unique to the digital medium appear." The same year, Mediapart reported that French webcomics take on a much smaller portion of its local comics market than Japanese and American webcomics do.

The primary economic model for blog BD is to release the work free of charge with the hope of signing a publishing contract. For instance, the 2012 success of Turbomedia webcomic MediaEntity led to a publishing deal with Delcourt. Crowdsourcing and crowdfunding are the main driver for various webcomic projects as well: services such as MyMajorCompany, Sandawe, and Manalosanctis allow readers to directly finance or even edit their favorite blog BD.

Thomas Cadène successfully implemented a subscription business model for digital comic book series Les Autres Gens in 2010. Drawing in over a hundred collaborators to work on the overarching narrative, Cadène drew inspiration from the "golden age of magazines" (characterized by Pilote, Le Journal de Spirou, and Le journal de Tintin) to create a successful subscription model. Several magazines were inspired in turn by Cadène's success, resulting in hybrid blog BD projects such as Professor Cyclopse and La Revue Dessinée.

=== Licensed BD numérique ===
In January 2017, Gilles Retier of l'Association des Critiques et journalistes de Bande Dessinée (ACBD) stated that licensed BD numérique still weren't able to attract a large enough audience. The economic model for BD numérique is still unclear: the market for published BD numérique is bound to a "symbolic figure of 1%" compared to comic books and strips, and larger publishers mainly stick to their digital platforms in order to not "abandon" this market to companies like Amazon.

Legal digitalization of traditional comic books did not escalate piracy significantly. In 2010, the platform Izneo was launched by several large French comics publishers, in order to make comic books available through the Internet. Authors expressed concerns for a decline of revenue because of such digital publications, but in reality, illegal downloading of BD numérique is very uncommon. Julien Falgas of The Conversation said that "this lack of interest in the illegal offer, while the legal offer does not take off either, is hardly encouraging for the economic future of cartoon authors if they fail to acclimate in the digital age."

== Turbomedia ==
Balak's 2009 tutorial for Turbomedia inspired American cartoonists like Joe Quesada and Mark Waid.

The term Turbomedia has come in use to describe blog BD where the reader needs to actively participate to read the work. Webcartoonist Balak launched a personal initiative to exploit the Web as a medium in 2009, and created a company and collective for Turbomedia webcomics in 2014. Balak described Turbomedia as a "grammar for digital comics." Turbomedia may be defined very broadly as "all a narrative in pictures on Internet on which the reader controls the speed of reading." In Turbomedia, a reader generally views only one panel at a time, but to keep it from being a simple slide show, the author may use animation and effects to interact with the reader. In Turbomedia, the reader is "the master of their own rhythm," as the reader is the one who decides whether to move on or not. Hence, animation is usually short and to the point, or sometimes loops as a GIF image. According to BDZ Magazine, sound is discouraged in Turbomedia, as it is primarily a visual medium.

Balak proposed the Turbomedia format because he found the successful BD numérique up to that point highly disappointing, saying that "they are either scanned boards uploaded online, or gimmicky effects are added to them like sound, voice or movement." Balak resolved to advocate the format after Marvel Comics did a presentation on motion comics at the 2009 San Diego Comic-Con. Adobe Flash became the software of choice to create Turbomedia works, though Balak noted that even PowerPoint would be an option for Turbomedia-creators.

Blogger Gilo stated that "Balak himself reinvented a whole toolbox" to express aspects of comics such as framing and mise-en-scène, saying that he fights against the artificiality of traditional comics. Gilo believes Turbomedia needs a strong community of active readers, because such blog BD can never see a print release. American cartoonist Joe Quesada stated that Balak "crystalized ... the future of digital comics," and described his vision of Turbomedia "essentially an animatic, but what makes it a comic is that the reader controls the timing in the same way that they control the turn of the page."

In contrast, Casterman-editor Didier Borg created a blog BD service Delitoon in 2011 that implements the infinitely-scrolling layout of South-Korean webtoons.

== We Do BD ==
In 2005, an annual blog BD-focused festival was co-created by Yannick Lejeune, titled Festiblog. The festival started out small, taking place outdoors and attracting a few BD blog enthusiasts. The event grew in size over the years. In 2015, Festiblog was renamed to "We Do BD" in order to include all BD numérique, not just blogs.
