= The Awkward Yeti =

Gag-a-day webcomic by Nick Seluk

- Author: Nick Seluk
- Website: theawkwardyeti.com
- Current status/schedule: Running
- Syndicate: Tapas
- Publisher(s): Rocketship Entertainment, Andrews McMeel Publishing
- Genre: Humor

The Awkward Yeti is an ongoing gag-a-day webcomic by Nick Seluk. Starting in 2012, the comic follows the daily life of the blue yeti Lars. Seluk posts The Awkward Yeti comics on his personal website, as well as on Tapas. Seluk has started a few spin-off comics on the website of The Awkward Yeti. These are Heart and Brain, a webcomic following the daily lives of an anthropomorphic heart and brain, and Medical Tales Retold, which repurposes real medical stories into comedic or touching comics.

== Nick Seluk ==
Nick Seluk graduated from Northville High School and earned a Bachelor's degree in psychology from Central Michigan University. Until 2014, Seluk worked as a senior graphic designer, a job he left in December to do webcomics full-time. He lives in Novi, Michigan, with three children.

== Overview ==
The Awkward Yeti, featuring Lars, was originally self-published as a children's book in 2012. As Seluk started to get attached to the character, he began creating more adult-oriented comics strips about Lars and uploading them on the Internet in September 2012. Lars is a socially awkward yeti, trying to get by in day-to-day life. Seluk has also created various spin-off comics on the website of The Awkward Yeti.

=== Heart and Brain ===
Heart and Brain

Heart and Brain features Lars' anthropomorphized heart and brain as the two main characters. In the webcomic, the heart follows its feelings and emotions, chasing down butterflies and getting excited about kittens, while the brain is concerned about adult responsibility. While the heart skips to emotional need, the brain brings in reason and logic for why the heart's action are ill-advised. Lindsey Holmes described Heart and Brain as "the internal tennis match we often face between our romantic hearts and our realistic brains." Other characters include Tongue, who is often hedonistic and manipulative; Stomach, who is often sensitive; and other organ characters.

The characters of Heart and Brain are considered very relatable, as they cover well-known dichotomies such as introversion and extroversion, and logic and emotion. Seluk's degree in psychology benefited him in reinforcing these aspects. The characters were metaphorically inspired by the concept of Id, Ego and Superego, represented by the heart, Lars, and the brain respectively. In November 2015, Seluk published a collection of Heart and Brain comics in a book.

=== Medical Tales Retold ===
For Medical Tales Retold, Seluk draws comics about unusual or touching stories he gets through his email. These stories are about illnesses and injuries and can be sent in by doctors or patients. The concept of Medical Tales Retold came up in collaboration with Tapastic. After Seluk saw an artist illustrate personal love stories through Tapastic, he thought it would be a good idea to normalize unusual medical stories through humor.

== OrganAttack ==
In June 2016, Seluk launched a Kickstarter campaign for a card game based on his webcomics, titled OrganAttack (Stylized OrganATTACK). The card game features medical and pseudoscientific concepts, where players have the objective to remove the organs of their opponents. The campaign reached over $280,000 USD in its first week and closed on July 3. OrganAttack released in November 2016 and was reviewed favorably by Forbes.

== Reception ==
Describing Heart and Brain as a "fun and eminently relatable read," Jan Johnston, collection development coordinator of the Fort Vancouver Regional Library District, praised Heart and Brain the comic as something that is "guaranteed to make you laugh [and] nod in empathy." Johnston also approved of its message to stop worrying and "let your heart lead the way." Heart and Brain: An Awkward Yeti Collection reached number 3 in the New York Times Best Seller list shortly after its release in November 2015.

"The Battle", the 26th episode of Medical Tales Retold, gained attention for visualizing the struggles of depression and anxiety. Lisa Winter of A Plus described the comic as an "amazing" illustration of a topic that can be difficult to explain, and Seluk himself was drawn to the story because it "broke an imaginary line between physical and mental ailments in my series." The Huffington Post said that "Anxiety and depression are complex mental health disorders than can be difficult to describe — but this comic totally nails it."

== Publications ==
- Seluk, Nick (December 5, 2012). The Awkward Yeti. CreateSpace. ISBN 978-1481152020.
- Seluk, Nick (October 2013). The Awkward Yeti's Complete Lack of Focus: Volume 1. BookBaby Print. ISBN 978-1619275454.
- Seluk, Nick (October 20, 2015). Heart and Brain: An Awkward Yeti Collection. Andrews McMeel Publishing. ISBN 9781449470890.
- Seluk, Nick (November 2, 2021). Lars the Awkward Yeti Volume 1. Rocketship Entertainment. ISBN 9781952126222.
