= 2010 in webcomics =

Notable events of 2010 in webcomics.

== Events ==
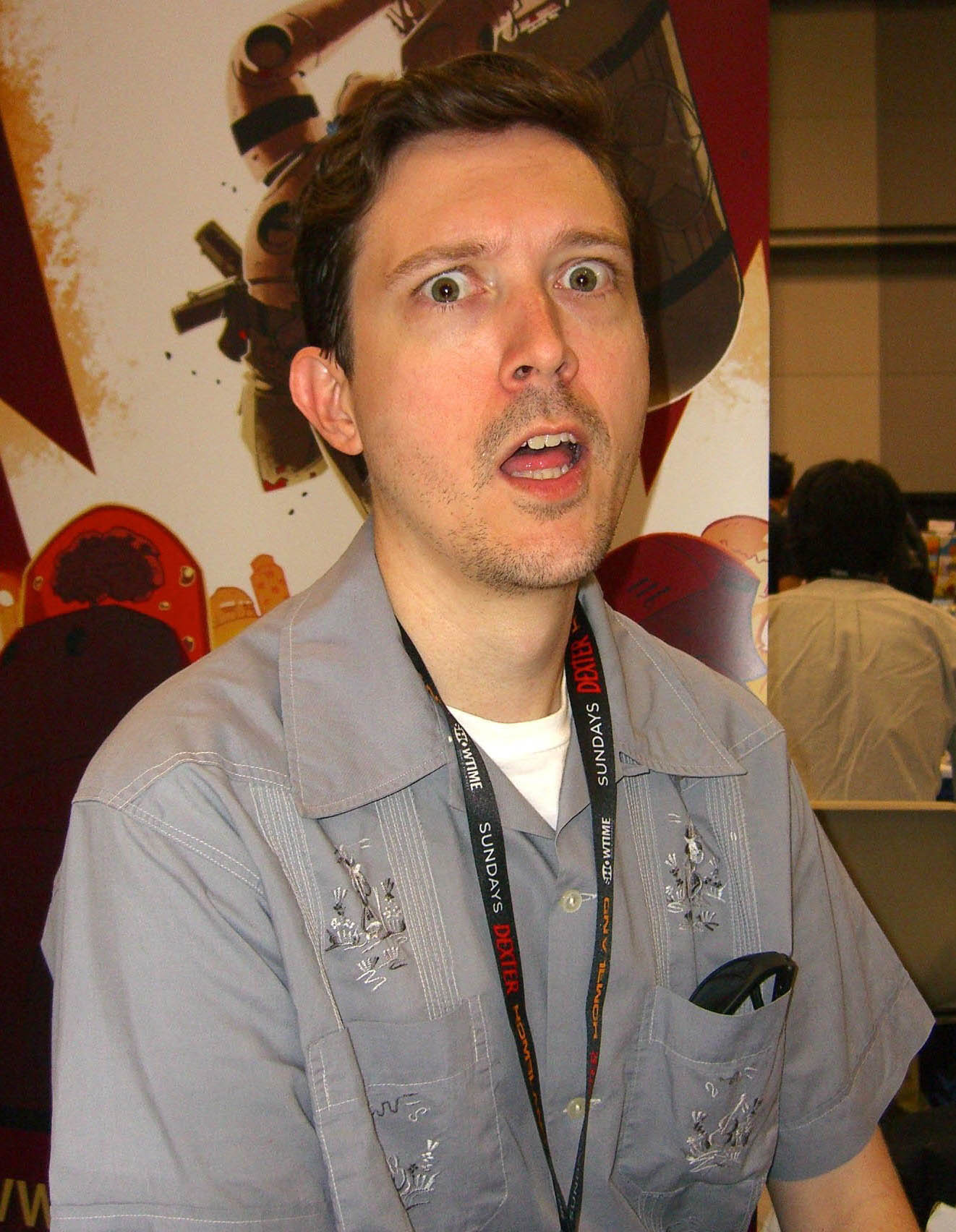
No other sprite comic has reached the same amount of popularity as Brian Clevinger's 8-Bit Theater after he concluded it in 2010.

- Keenspot stopped being a webcomic collective and moved to content development and publishing on July 1.
- After launching a new mobile platform, DC Comics shuts down their Zuda Comics imprint in July.
- The New England Webcomics Weekend was held for the second and last time on November 6–7.

=== Awards ===
- Clickburg Webcomic Awards, won by Hallie Lama, Setsuna, and Michiel van de Pol.
- Eagle Awards, "Favourite Web-Based Comic" won by Warren Ellis and Paul Duffield's FreakAngels.
- Eisner Awards, "Best Digital Comic" won by Cameron Stewart's Sin Titulo.
- Harvey Awards, "Best Online Comics Work" won by Scott Kurtz' PvP.
- Ignatz Awards, "Outstanding Online Comic" won by Mike Dawson's Troop 142.
- Joe Shuster Awards, "Outstanding Webcomic Creator" won by Karl Kerschl (The Abominable Charles Christopher).
- Hugo Award for Best Graphic Story won by Kaja Foglio, Phil Foglio, and Cheyenne Wright's Girl Genius, Volume 9.

=== Webcomics started ===
- January 8 — Denma by Yang Yeong-soon
- February 9 — Zahra's Paradise by Amil and Khalil
- February 23 — Dream Life, a late coming of age by Salgood Sam
- April 1 — I Taste Sound by Mike Riley
- May 8 — Go Get a Roomie! by Chloé C.
- June 12 — Whomp! by Ronnie Filyaw
- June 30 — Paranatural by Zack Morrison
- July — Vattu by Evan Dahm
- July 14 — Unsounded by Ashley Cope
- August 27 — Shadowbinders by Kambrea and Thom Pratt
- December 24 — The Wormworld Saga by Daniel Lieske
- Along with the Gods by Joo Ho-min
- Cheapjack Shakespeare by Shaun McLaughlin
- Cheese in the Trap by Soonkki
- Crocodile in Water, Tiger on Land
- Si Juki by Faza Ibnu Ubaidillah Salman
- Tower of God by Lee Jong-hui

=== Webcomics ended ===
- Goats by Jonathan Rosenberg, 1997 – 2010
- 8-Bit Theater by Brian Clevinger, 2001 – 2010
- A Modest Destiny by Sean Howard, 2003 – 2010
- Girly by Jackie Lesnick, 2003 – 2010
- Fission Chicken by J.P. Morgan, 2006 – 2010
- Order of Tales by Evan Dahm, 2008 – 2010
- Writer J by Oh Seong-dae, 2009 – 2010
