= 2006 in webcomics =

Notable events of 2006 in webcomics.

== Events ==
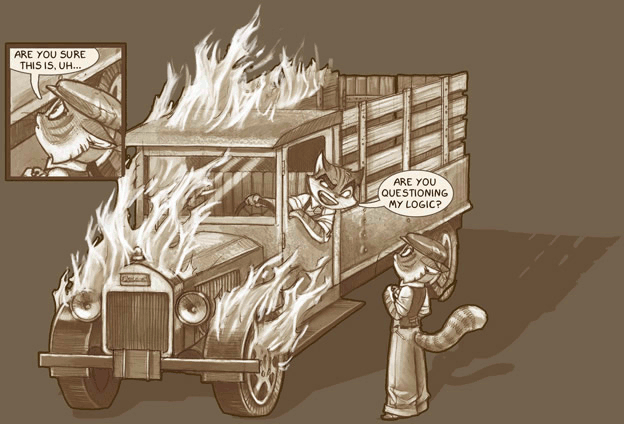
Lackadaisy started in July 2006.

- Platinum Studios purchases website DrunkDuck, with the purpose of publishing comic books online before creating physical releases.
- Webcomics collective ACT-I-VATE debuted in February.

=== Awards ===
- Web Cartoonist's Choice Awards, "Outstanding Comic" won by Nicholas Gurewitch's The Perry Bible Fellowship.
- Clickburg Webcomic Awards, won by Liz Greenfield, Stephan Brusche, and Daniel Merlin Goodbrey.
- Ignatz Awards, "Outstanding Online Comic" won by Nicholas Gurewitch's The Perry Bible Fellowship.
- Eagle Awards, "Favourite Web-Based Comic" won by Batton Lash's Supernatural Law.
- Eisner Awards, "Best Digital Comic" won by Scott Kurtz' PvP.
- Harvey Awards, "Best Online Comics Work" won by James Kochalka's American Elf.
- Weblog Awards, "Best Comic Strip" won by Ryan Sohmer and Lar deSouza's Least I Could Do.

=== Webcomics started ===
- January 5 — The Dreamland Chronicles by Scott Christian Sava
- January 22 — San Antonio Rock City by Mitch Clem
- January 27 — The Jimi Homeless Experience (webcomic) by J.F. Kinyon
- February 9 — minus by Ryan Armand
- February 8 — The New Adventures Of Queen Victoria, by Pab Sungenis
- February 13 — Married to the Sea by Drew and Natalie Dee
- March 1 — Planet Karen by Karen Ellis
- April 16 — Fission Chicken by J.P. Morgan
- April 18 — Tonari no 801-chan by Ajiko Kojima
- April – Rice Boy by Evan Dahm
- June — Cheshire Crossing by Andy Weir
- July 19 — Lackadaisy by Tracy Butler
- July — What the Duck by Aaron Johnson
- September 20— Awkward Zombie by Katie Tiedrich
- November 6 — Looking For Group by Ryan Sohmer and Lar DeSouza
- November 11 Skin Deep by Kory Bingaman
- December 7 — Erfworld by Rob Balder and Jamie Noguchi
- December 25 — Last Blood by Bobby Crosby and Owen Gieni
- The Sound of Heart by Jo Seok

=== Webcomics ended ===
- Doctor Fun by David Farley, 1993 – 2006
- Narbonic by Shaenon K. Garrity, 2000 – 2006
- Anima: Age of the Robots by Johnny Tay, 2003 – 2006
- Sokora Refugees by Semaui and Melissa Dejesus, 2004 – 2006
- Concerned: The Half-Life and Death of Gordon Frohman by Christopher C. Livingston, 2005 – 2006
