= List of video game webcomics =

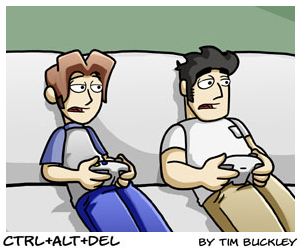
Ethan and Lucas from Ctrl+Alt+Del playing video games on their couch

Many webcomics have been influenced by video games and video game culture.

== Background ==
Webcomics often satirize:

- Video game logic
- Industry practices
- Gamer stereotypes

The earliest video game webcomic was Polymer City Chronicles, which started in 1995. However, 1998's PvP is seen as the origin of the genre, influencing various webcomics following it. Low-quality video game webcomics were particularly common in the mid-2000s, often featuring author stand-ins with poor dialogue and unrealistic relationships. A common trope in video game webcomics is to have the main characters sit on a couch, talking about the game they are playing.

It is common for webcomics to exclusively use in-game art and speech bubbles, such as in sprite comics. The term gamics has been proposed by Nathan Ciprick in 2004 to refer to webcomics that consist entirely of video game graphics. Despite the fact that video game graphics are generally copyrighted, owners of the intellectual properties used have traditionally been tolerant.

== Webcomics set in a video game world ==
Title	Creator	Run	Based on	Ref.
8-Bit Theater	Brian Clevinger	2001–2010	Various Nintendo Entertainment System games, including Final Fantasy, Metroid and River City Ransom.	
Awkward Zombie	Katie Tiedrich	2006–	Various, most notably Super Smash Bros.	
Bob and George	David Anez	2000–2007	Mega Man	
Brawl in the Family	Matthew Taranto	2008–2014	Super Smash Bros.	
Concerned	Christopher C. Livingston	2005–2006	Half-Life 2	
Dueling Analogs	Steve Napierski	2005–2018	Various	
Little Devil (webcomic)	Michael Armstrong-Ingram	2025–	Little Devil	
Prequel (or Making A Cat Cry: The Adventure)	Kazerad	2011–	The Elder Scrolls IV: Oblivion	
Super Effective	Scott Ramsoomair	2008–2018	Pokémon	

== Webcomics about video games ==
Title	Creator	Run	Style	Ref.
Ctrl+Alt+Del	Tim Buckley	2002–	"Gamer on a couch" comic	
GU Comics	Woody Hearn	2000–		
Megatokyo	Fred Gallagher and Rodney Caston	2000–	Follows the adventures of a manga and video game fan in Tokyo, Japan.	
Penny Arcade	Jerry Holkins and Mike Krahulik	1998–	"Gamer on a couch" comic	
Polymer City Chronicles	Chris Morrison	1995–2007		
PvP	Scott Kurtz	1998–	Follows a fictional video game magazine company and its employees.	
VG Cats	Scott Ramsoomair	2001–	"Gamer on a couch" comic in which the characters frequently take on the role of their player character.	

== Webcomics inspired by video games ==
Title	Creator	Run	Inspiration	Ref.
Cucumber Quest	Gigi D.G.	2011–	Adventure webcomic influenced by Kirby and Paper Mario.	
MS Paint Adventures	Andrew Hussie	2007–	Webcomics on MSPaintAdventures are inspired by interactive fiction and role-playing video games, having started out as a "mock adventure game". The latest webcomic, Homestuck, follows a group of four kids playing a reality-changing video game.	

== Other ==
ShiftyLook moved on to cartoons in 2012, with animated web series based on Bravoman and Mappy.

ShiftyLook, a former subsidiary of Namco Bandai, focused on reviving various Namco video game franchises between 2011 and 2014. The company originally did this through English language webcomics. ShiftyLook has released webcomics based on Dig Dug, Dragon Spirit, Klonoa, and various other video games.

== See also ==
- Category:Video game webcomics
- Sprite comic
