= Skin Deep =

Skin Deep may refer to:

== Film ==
- Skin Deep (1922 film), a film by Lambert Hillyer
- Skin Deep (1929 film), a film by Ray Enright
- Skin Deep (1978 film), a New Zealand film
- Skin Deep (1984 film), Australian film by Chris Langman and Mark Joffe
- Skin Deep (1989 film), a film by Blake Edwards
- Skin Deep (1995 film), a film by Midi Onodera
- Skin Deep (2015 film), a film by Jonnie Leahy with Billie Rose Prichard
- Skin Deep (2022 film), also known as Aus meiner Haut, a film by Alex Schaad

== Television episodes ==
- "Skin Deep" (General Hospital: Night Shift)
- "Skin Deep" (Grimm)
- "Skin Deep" (House)
- "Skin Deep" (Law & Order)
- "Skin Deep" (Magnum, P.I.)
- "Skin Deep" (Once Upon a Time)
- "Skin Deep" (The Outer Limits)
- "Skin Deep" (Taggart)

== Music ==
- Skin Deep (Louis Bellson album) (1955)
  - "Skin Deep", a composition by Louie Bellson
- Skin Deep (Buddy Guy album) (2008)
- Skin Deep (Solé album) (1999)
- Skin Deep, an album by Peter Doyle, or the title song (1977)
- "Skin Deep" (Cher song)
- "Skin Deep" (The Stranglers song)
- "Skin Deep", a song by Area-7 from Bitter & Twisted
- "Skin Deep", a 1994 song by Guns n' Wankers from For Dancing and Listening
- Skin Deep, a 2009 opera composed by David Sawer with a libretto by Armando Iannucci

== Books ==
- Skin Deep. The Truth About Beauty Aids – Safe and Harmful, a 1934 book by M. C. Phillips
- Skin Deep, a 1992 graphic novel by Charles Burns
- Skin Deep, a 1996 novel by Lois Ruby
- Skin Deep: Inside the World of Black Fashion Models, a 1998 non-fiction book by Barbara Summers

== Other uses ==
- Skin Deep (cosmetics database)
- Skin Deep (webcomic), a webcomic by Kory Bing
- Skin Deep (video game), a 2025 video game by Blendo Games

== See also ==
- Skin depth, in electronics
