= Bob and George =

Sprite comic started in 2000

- Bob and George strip from December 18, 2001
- Author: David Anez
- Website: http://www.bobandgeorge.com/
- Current status/schedule: Concluded
- Launch date: April 1, 2000
- End date: July 28, 2007
- Genre(s): Comedy, Sprite comic, Science fiction

Bob and George was a sprite-based webcomic which parodied the fictional universe of Mega Man. It was written by David Anez, who was a physics instructor living in the American Midwest at the time. The comic first appeared on April 1, 2000, and ran until July 28, 2007. It was updated daily, with there being only 29 days without a comic in its seven years of production and with 2568 comics being made altogether.

Most Bob and George strips are still images. The initial strips were mostly done in GIF format (occasionally using JPEG for more graphic-intensive comics) before converting to PNG in May 2004. In addition, occasional comics are animated using either animated GIFs or Macromedia Flash. Some of the Flash comics have the characters speaking, voiced by Anez and others (often forum members). Animated comics are generally used for the annual week-long anniversary parties (usually culminating in a brief animated comic that recaps the events of the past year in a matter of seconds), for especially climactic scenes, and for a series of videos depicting an in-comic event known as "the Cataclysm".

The comic's plot is mostly made up of story arcs of varying lengths. Amongst past story arcs there have been retellings of various Mega Man games (which often play out quite differently from the originals), as well as battles against powerful foes. In addition, many of the story arcs involve time travel, dimensional travel, and villains who want to kill all the characters.

== History ==
An early hand-drawn comic from June 7, 2000

Bob and George was originally planned to be a hand-drawn webcomic about the college adventures of the two titular brothers. Slated to start on April 1, 2000, the plan fell through because Anez did not have a scanner with which to scan his drawings. He stated "I was hoping to use my friend's scanner, but he was never around." He instead released a sequence of filler comics using Mega Man sprites, which he intended to be a temporary measure until he gained access to a scanner, at which point he would implement his initial plan involving the hand drawn comics. He eventually purchased a scanner, and on June 1 he released the hand-drawn comic.

The hand-drawn comic was to revolve around a group of superheroes attending college. Neither the initial attempt nor a later attempt at it went well, and both times he returned to the Mega Man sprite comic. Anez has stated that he hated the hand-drawn comic. The hand-drawn comic made something of a return in the storyline "All Good Things"—the hand-drawn format is used to represent George's home dimension, though this time drawn by Liss, Dave's wife. Dave stated the reason for this is he realized that he still could not draw, and was not going to get any better.

However, this meant that the comic strip was titled "Bob and George", but did not contain any characters named "Bob" or "George". This was fixed with the introduction of sprite versions of the two characters into the comic. Bob is depicted as a gray Proto Man recolor while George is a Mega Man recolor with blond hair and no helmet.

David planned to end the comic by April 1, 2007, which is the end of the seventh year of the comic's run. However, the story took longer than expected, and the comic ended on Anez's birthday, July 28, 2007. There were a total of 2,658 daily comics produced.

== Significance ==
While not the first webcomic to ever use video game sprites in place of hand-drawn art, Bob and George is noted as being the first sprite comic to gain widespread popularity and the originator of the sprite comic "craze". At the height of its readership in 2004, Bob and George held an Alexa traffic rank of around 20,000. Anez's comic "paved the way" for the creation of numerous other sprite comics, including Oldskooled, Life of Wily, and Brian Clevinger's 8-Bit Theater. Clevinger has called Anez "the Father of Sprite Comics" for his role in popularizing the phenomenon, and directly credits a friend showing him Anez's Bob and George for his inspiration to make his comic. Regarding the use of sprites in a comic, Clevinger has said,

As we all know, it's only a comic if it uses art, and it can only be art if it's hand drawn. David [Anez] didn't know it then, but he'd be the pioneer in shattering this stereotype.

== Cast ==
The first frame of the April 1, 2005 anniversary comic, showing many different characters

Bob and George has a large cast of characters consisting of characters from the Mega Man series of games, as well as original characters created by Anez and others.

- Mega Man – the robotic protagonist of the original Mega Man video game series.
- The Author – the (nearly) all-powerful being who creates the comic. He appears as a blue/purple palette swap of Mega Man without his helmet. Alternate versions of The Author, such as "The Helmeted Author" and "The Shadowy Author", appear in Bob and George as antagonists.
- Bob – the younger, evil, and more mature brother of George. His alter-ego is Napalm, a super-powered being with control over fire. He is very adept at programming. He is a grey palette swap of Proto Man, with red hair underneath his helmet. His abilities in combat and his intelligence surpass most of the other characters, to the point he's referred to himself as a Mary Sue.
- George – heroic where his younger brother Bob is villainous. His alter-ego is Blitz, a super hero with control over lightning. George is a light blue and grey palette swap of helmet-less Mega Man with flat, blonde hair.

Other characters featured in Bob and George include Proto Man, Dr. Light, Roll, and Bass. Mega Man characters such as Dr. Wily, X, and Zero are featured in Bob and George as villains and adversaries.

== Storyline ==
The first 6 months or so were filler comics with the cast of the Mega Man franchise participating in humorous actions, the attack of the Yellow Devil (who would later become Nate), and a parody of the first Mega Man game.

Near the end of the first year, Bob and George, the title characters, were finally introduced. While George was a recolor of Mega Man, Bob was a recolor of Proto Man. Bob tried to kill everyone in the Mega Man Universe, but was later stopped by Nate.

In the second year, X arrived from the future to assist Mega Man in a parody of Mega Man 2. After a series of filler comics, Mynd (a recolor of Sigma) appeared and killed everyone in the cast except the title characters who later stop him. They were later revived by the Author.

The third year begins with George accidentally traveling back to the events of Mega Man 3. This is followed by the attack of Evil Mega Man (later revealed to be the Helmeted Author).

The fourth and fifth years follow the same basic structure, covering the events of Mega Man 4 and Mega Man 5, and the attack of the Helmeted Author and Non-Alternate Mynd (different from Mynd).

In the sixth year, the X in the present is awakened and attempts to assimilate the entire cast, although he is stopped by George. This is followed by the Robot Master Tournament story arc and the Mega Man 6 parody.

Finally, the seventh year follows George cycling through the past, present, and future, fighting Captain Kinesis, Non-Alternate Mynd, and Sigma. After defeating all of them, the entire cast engages in a battle against Bob (who has merged with the Helmeted Author). Bob finally attempts to blow up the Mega Man universe after he fails to defeat the cast, although he is stopped by the Shadowy Author, who merged with George. Bob attempts to kill the Author, although George stops him by pointing his blaster at him. Bob claims that George lacked the guts to shoot him, but George shoots the blaster anyway.

In the second-to-last strip, the Helmeted Author (who is revealed to have merged with Bob) separates himself from Bob and expresses anger at losing a bet to the Author about whether George would kill Bob or not. George asks if the entire comic was a bet, which is met with the answer of "only for the last couple of years". Finally, their mom appears and explains that she used the Mega Man universe as a way to toughen George up in case Bob ever crossed the line.

The Epilogue has all of the characters die in the Cataclysm, which was caused by Zero. However, it was later revealed that the Cataclysm never happened because Zero revealed to Dr. Wily that by activating him, the whole Mega Man cast would die. After Wily realizes that activating Zero would cause his own death, he chooses not to activate Zero. However, in order to ensure the timeline, the entire cast has to fake their deaths, then move to Acapulco, where they all live happily ever after.
