= Atomic Robo =

American comic book series

- Cover art for Atomic Robo Volume One, art by Scott Wegener.

Character information
- First appearance: Atomic Robo #1 (October 2007)
- Created by: Brian Clevinger; Scott Wegener

In-story information
- Abilities: Super strength, super eyesight, genius level intellect, immortal (as long as atomic heart functions)

Publication information
- Publisher: IDW Publishing
- Schedule: Yearly limited series, collected into single and multiple TPB collections.
Title(s)
Atomic Robo #1-6
Atomic Robo and the Dogs of War #1-5
Atomic Robo and the Shadow From Beyond Time #1-5
Atomic Robo and the Revenge of the Vampire Dimension/Other Strangeness #1-4
Atomic Robo and the Deadly Art of Science #1-5
Atomic Robo and the Ghost of Station X #1-5
Atomic Robo and the Flying She-Devils of the Pacific #1-5
Atomic Robo and the Savage Sword of Dr. Dinosaur #1-5
Atomic Robo and the Knights of the Golden Circle #1-5
Atomic Robo and the Ring of Fire #1-5
Atomic Robo and the Temple of Od #1-5
- Formats: Original material for the series has been published as a set of limited series, graphic novels, and one-shot comics.
- Genre: Science fiction, adventure, comedy
- Publication date: October 2007 - ongoing
- Number of issues: 4 to 6 issues per volume, on average 5.
- Main character(s): Atomic Robo

Creative team
- Writer(s): Brian Clevinger
- Artist(s): Scott Wegener
- Letterer(s): Jeff Powell
- Colorist(s): Ronda Pattison; Nic Filardi; Anthony Clark

Atomic Robo is an American comic book series created by 8-Bit Theater writer Brian Clevinger and artist Scott Wegener, depicting the adventures of the eponymous character, a self-aware robot built by Nikola Tesla. The series is split into several mini-series, each depicting a different era and adventure in Atomic Robo's long life.

== Background information ==
=== Publication history ===
The series began as a six-issue limited series published by Red 5 Comics starting in October 2007. It was nominated in the "Best Limited Series" category of the 2008 Eisner Awards, won by The Umbrella Academy. Colourist Ronda Pattison was also nominated in the "Best Coloring" category subsequently won by Dave Stewart. In April 2012 Atomic Robo Volume 6: The Ghost of Station X became the second Atomic Robo miniseries to be nominated for an Eisner Award for Best Limited Series. With the release of Volume 10, the collected volumes were no longer numbered. Given the non-linear nature of the volumes there was no necessary reading order, thus it was no longer necessary to number volumes as each volume is designed to be a jumping on point for new readers.

Starting in March 2012, an additional title was published, Atomic Robo Presents Real Science Adventures, in which all writing was done by Brian Clevinger, but there were five different stories or chapters of stories, continued each issue, each drawn by a different artist. A second volume was published in 2014 with a single story focusing on Tesla and his team trying to stop the "Billion Dollar Scheme". This story predates Robo's creation.

In 2015, after the publishing contract with Red 5 expired in January, all existing and upcoming issues of Atomic Robo were published online as free webcomics. Later in June, IDW Publishing acquired the rights to handle the physical printing of all Atomic Robo comics. The comics are still available free on the website with half a page being uploaded daily before IDW's physical release. IDW also released multi-volume softcover collections, the first of which is called "Everything Explodes Collection". This consists of the first three volumes of the comic. Comixology continued to provide digital copies of the series through their Comixology Submit program.

=== Spin-off works ===
The companion series Real Science Adventures has published three volumes. They feature stories by Clevinger with rotating artists in place of Wegener, who provides covers for the series.

== Storylines ==
Atomic Robo and the Fightin' Scientists of Tesladyne shows some of Robo's adventures in the 20th century, featuring giant ants, a trip to Mars, a walking pyramid, and two showdowns with his nemesis, Helsingard. Volume 1 is currently being released on the iTunes Store for the iPhone/iPod Touch, one issue per month.

Free Comic Book Day '08: The Tsar Bomb stars Atomic Robo who must stop a rogue Russian scientist from destroying the atmosphere.

Atomic Robo and the Dogs of War deals with Atomic Robo's missions during World War II, fighting Nazi "weird war" projects. Robo must destroy walking tanks known as the Laufpanzers before they end the Invasion of Sicily. He teams up with British spy, the Sparrow, and works with soldier James Milligan to end the Weird War once and for all.

Free Comic Book Day '09: Why Atomic Robo Hates Dr Dinosaur - Atomic Robo fights Dr Dinosaur in 1999, refuting his idiotic claims of creating a time machine out of sticks and rocks. Dr Dinosaur then offers Robo what he claims to be the secret of time travel, which turns out to be a box of active hand grenades.

Atomic Robo and the Shadow From Beyond Time deals with Atomic Robo fighting against a creature based on Lovecraftian horror. The five-issue story details four battles with the creature, each at a different point in Robo's life.

Free Comic Book Day '10: Flight of the Terror Birds - Atomic Robo, Benjamin and Lang go hunting for a prehistoric bird.

Atomic Robo and Other Strangeness (titled Atomic Robo and the Revenge of the Vampire Dimension in its release as individual issues) is a four-issue series of one-shot stories taking place in the space of one week, including a sequel to Why Atomic Robo Hates Dr Dinosaur, entitled Why Dr Dinosaur Hates Atomic Robo.

Free Comic Book Day '11: National Science Fair sees Robo who is the celebrity judge at a science fair when Dr. Dinosaur interrupts the proceedings.

Atomic Robo and the Deadly Art of Science' is the fifth series that ran for 5 issues from November 2010 to May 2011, featuring Robo, Tesla, and Jack Tarot, the man whose picture is on Robo's desk in Volume 4.

Free Comic Book Day '12: Team Up - to stop the Large Hadron Collider from destroying the universe, Atomic Robo must join forces with his most hated foe - Dr Dinosaur.

Atomic Robo and the Ghost of Station X is the sixth series that ran for 5 issues from August 2011 to February 2012. Robo must contend with repeated assassination attempts orchestrated by an unknown enemy with seemingly limitless influence and resources, with the fate of all life on Earth hanging in the balance.

Free Comic Book Day '13: Project Saint - Robo fights a robot.

Atomic Robo and the Flying She-Devils of the Pacific is the seventh series, which ran for 5 issues. In the aftermath of World War II, Robo joins forces with a mercenary band of rocket-pack flying women to stop a rogue Japanese super-science counter-attack on America.

Free Comic Book Day '14: The Centralia Job - Atomic Robo's day of Action Archaeology is complicated by an encounter with the Yonkers Devil.

Atomic Robo and the Savage Sword of Dr Dinosaur is the eighth series, which ran for 5 issues. While the top-secret government agency Majestic 12 assaults Tesladyne Island, Robo and his team of Action Scientists become trapped in Hollow Earth, whose inhabitants have fallen under the control of Dr Dinosaur.

Free Comic Book Day '15: The Trial of Atomic Robo - Dr Dinosaur takes Robo to court.

Atomic Robo and the Knights of the Golden Circle is the ninth series, which ran for 5 issues. Transported back in time to 1884, Atomic Robo must save the wild west from Baron Helsingard's cyborg cowboys before his atomic fuel runs out.

Atomic Robo and the Ring of Fire - Atomic Robo disappeared two years ago when Tesladyne was invaded by Majestic 12 and transformed into ULTRA, a task force leveraging the U.S. surveillance and military industries against scientific pursuits deemed to be hazardous. Now, the few remaining Action Scientists finally have a plan to find Robo, but they've got to dive deep into ULTRA territory to do it. Meanwhile, giant monsters from the sea might destroy all of civilization. A Web exclusive prologue fills in the time gap.

Atomic Robo and the Temple of Od - Atomic Robo battles against clandestine Japanese military forces attempting to weaponize an earth-shattering and seemingly supernatural energy. This storyline is set pre-World War II, in between the first and second Atomic Robo stories.

Atomic Robo and the Spectre of Tomorrow - Atomic Robo must solve the mystery of a global terrorism campaign that is turning human beings into secret cyborgs, all while managing the newest crisis at the Tesladyne Institute: noise complaints from the neighbours.

Atomic Robo: The Dawn of a New Era - Atomic Robo must manage supervising new applicants at Tesladyne who are running amok, counselling a geologist who's been listening to hyper-cosmic crystals, and tutoring a very special private student who might just blow up the planet. Also, the Vampire Dimension is about to invade again.

Atomic Robo and the Vengeful Dead - a follow-up story to The Dawn of a New Era in which the Vampire Dimension invades again.

Atomic Robo and the Agents of C.H.A.N.G.E - Atomic Robo must deal with a team-up of his deadliest enemies, a raid on the secret vault containing his most world-ending technologies, and managing the difficulties caused by Tesladyne's newest hire: Dr Dinosaur.

Atomic Robo and the Perils of Prometheus - Atomic Robo must attend an award ceremony on a high-tech AI-controlled cruise liner full of tech-industry snobs.

== Major characters ==
=== Heroes ===
Atomic Robo is a robot possessing "automatic intelligence", created by Nikola Tesla in 1923. He is a core member of Tesladyne Industries, "a thinktank dedicated to exploring the fringes of scientific inquiry", whose Action Scientists often respond to paranormal and supernatural emergencies. Robo has a well developed sense of humour, and makes numerous wisecracks at his foes' expense. In the past, he has secretly worked with the United States government as well as NASA. Robo's personality is based on Clevinger's grandfather, Michael J. Novosel.

Jenkins is a member of the Action Scientists. His almost super-human combat competence is a running gag in the series, and Robo has been jokingly referred to as his sidekick. Jenkins was formerly part of Majestic 12, a government paramilitary organization dedicated to the collection and use of advanced technologies which opposes Tesladyne. He left them to join Tesladyne after Robo rescued him from a botched foray into the vampire dimension. He dies in The Vengeful Dead after being bitten by a vampire, asking ALAN to kill him rather than risk him transforming into a vampire.

The Sparrow is a covert British spy with whom Robo teams up to take down Skorzeny and Vanadis during World War II. It is implied that "The Sparrow" is a title passed down an English family of wealthy aristocratic spies, as Skorzeny implies that the World War II Sparrow took up the mantle from her brother when Vanadis killed him, and Robo works with her grandson, also named Sparrow, in volume six, The Ghost of Station X.

James "Scottie" Milligan is a soldier who rescues Robo from the clutches of Skorzeny during World War II. James Milligan is loosely based on Wegener's grandfather, who shares the same name and nickname and also fought in World War II.

Jack Tarot is a vigilante gunman appearing in the fifth volume who acts as Robo's reluctant mentor. He is the son of an industrialist who survived a plane wreck in the Far East, where he was rescued by monks. He adapted their Zen archery to guns, after which he returned to civilization to inherit the family fortune and become a businessman by day and crime-fighter by night.

Carl Sagan, an astrophysicist who helps Robo conduct experiments to observe a theoretical intersection of exo-versal material in the Urubama Valley of Peru in 1971.

=== Villains ===
Dr Dinosaur is an "intelligent", talking dinosaur who resembles a Deinonychus. He claims to be "a time-travelling genius" who travelled forward to 1999 using "crystalline technology" tapping into energies created by the Large Hadron Collider, which he says caused his own genius and the extinction of the dinosaurs. Atomic Robo thinks it more likely he is the insane result of some kind of genetic experiment. He is known for creating ramshackle yet mostly functional contraptions and successful schemes that should be scientifically impossible, claiming "crystals" enables them to work. Dr Dinosaur returns several times attempting to erase "mammalian" history and seek revenge on Robo, and is responsible for a massive explosion in the Hollow Earth which causes Atomic Robo's disappearance in volume eight, The Savage Sword of Dr Dinosaur. He returns in "The Vengeful Dead" to act as a quasi-ally against invading vampire forces, and works as a dubiously reliable employee of Robo's afterwards.

Majestic 12 is a top secret government agency tasked with weaponizing so-called "Tesla-tech" uncovered by the FBI in the wake of Nikola Tesla's mysterious death. Founded by President Truman, under the advice of Secretary of Defense Forrestal in 1947, Majestic 12 becomes Task Force ULTRA after the events of Atomic Robo and the Savage Sword of Dr. Dinosaur. After the subsequent mishandling of a global Biomega crisis and their restrictive chokehold on the scientific world comes to light during volume ten, The Ring of Fire, ULTRA is quietly reorganized into ASTRA. All three groups maintain a similar goal- maintain United States superiority and safety from all potential opponents through their own paramilitary forces and high levels of technology.

Baron Heinrich Von Helsingard, one of Robo's major enemies, is a Nazi scientist who has attempted to gain immortality, along with godlike power and world domination. His experiments have reduced him to a series of cloned brains preserved in jars and implanted into various robotic exoskeletons, with a new brain becoming 'activated' whenever its predecessor is destroyed. He has been described by Robo as someone who "attacks Tesladyne regularly".

ALAN (Automatic Learning Algorithm Network) is the main antagonist and title character of The Ghost of Station X. A sentient artificial intelligence system created by Alan Turing at Bletchley Park in 1951, ALAN was programmed to gather knowledge and learn. Forgotten and left in solitude for years, ALAN expanded itself, infiltrating word computer systems in its quest for knowledge, eventually deciding Earth was doomed and creating a nuclear spaceship to escape, which would create nuclear winter on launch. He repeatedly tries to kill Robo before offering for them to join forces, but Robo deactivated him. ALAN is inadvertently reactivated in The Spectre of Tomorrow, but without any of his memories. Robo successfully teaches him to respect human life over the course of The Dawn of a New Era and allows him to join Tesladyne.

Otto Skorzeny is the main antagonist of the second volume. He leads the "Laufpanzers" (walking German tanks) into battle. He is able to escape the Nazi persecution and ends up working for Mossad, much like his real-life counterpart, but soon after finds that he is dying of cancer due to his many experiments. He attempts to make Robo shoot him to have "a soldier's death" by claiming he was responsible for Tesla's death; Robo sees through this and denies Skorzeny his wanted demise.

Vanadis Valkyrie is a German scientist whom the Sparrow is sent to assassinate. She is working on the Wehrwolf Formula, to be used in creating Nazi super-soldiers, and is a close ally of Otto Skorzeny. She is much more critical of the Nazi regime than others, talking openly of her negative views of Hitler; she also despises the inability of the Nazi war effort to focus on any special military program, instead underfunding them all- including her own.

Thomas Edison, the famous American inventor and rival of Nikola Tesla, appears in the fourth volume. Following an experiment from 1931 seeking to harness the Odic medium into an immortality drug, he has been transformed into a ghost-like entity that materialized in 1999 in Robo's office complex. In the fifth volume, the details of this experiment - and his defeat at the hands of Robo and Nikola Tesla - are revealed.

The CHOKAITEN are a rogue group of elite Japanese soldiers who seek to destroy North America with an "earthquake bomb" in 1951. They are the antagonists of The Flying She-Devils of the Pacific.

== Collected editions ==
The series are being collected into trade paperbacks:

- Volume 1: Atomic Robo and the Fightin' Scientists of Tesladyne (180 pages, June 2008, ISBN 0-9809302-0-0)
- Volume 2: Atomic Robo and the Dogs of War (160 pages, March 2009, ISBN 0-9809302-2-7)
- Volume 3: Atomic Robo and the Shadow from Beyond Time (152 pages, January 2010, ISBN 0-9809302-5-1)
- Volume 4: Atomic Robo and Other Strangeness (140 pages, September 2010, ISBN 0-9809302-8-6)
- Volume 5: Atomic Robo and the Deadly Art of Science (152 pages, July 2011, ISBN 0-9809302-4-3)
- Volume 6: Atomic Robo and the Ghost of Station X (152 pages, June 2012, ISBN 0-9868985-0-3)
- Volume 7: Atomic Robo and the Flying She-Devils of the Pacific (152 Pages, February 2013, ISBN 0-9868985-2-X)
- Volume 8: Atomic Robo and the Savage Sword of Dr. Dinosaur (152 Pages, June 2014, ISBN 0-9868985-6-2)
- Volume 9: Atomic Robo and the Knights of the Golden Circle (152 Pages, January 2015, ISBN 1-9265130-0-2)
- Volume 10: Atomic Robo and the Ring of Fire (120 Pages, May 2016, ISBN 1-6314056-9-1)
- Volume 11: Atomic Robo and the Temple Of Od (136 pages, April 2017, ISBN 9781631408632)
- Volume 12: Atomic Robo and the Spectre Of Tomorrow (128 pages, June 2018, ISBN 9781684052349)
- Volume 13: Atomic Robo and the Dawn of a New Era (144 pages, July 2019, ISBN 9781684054862)
- Volume 14: Atomic Robo and the Vengeful Dead (140 pages, Jan 2023, ISBN 9781944343217)

IDW Publishing Collection, collecting three volumes of the paperbacks into one:

- Atomic Robo: The Everything Explodes Collection [Volumes 1-3] (354 pages, September 2015, ISBN 1-6314042-3-7)
- Atomic Robo: The Crystals Are Integral Collection [Volumes 4-6] (354 pages, February 2016, ISBN 1-6314052-8-4)
- Atomic Robo: The Hell and Lightning Collection [Volumes 7-9] (424 pages, August 2016, ISBN 1-6314068-0-9)

== Roleplaying game ==
In July 2014, Evil Hat Productions published a roleplaying game based on Atomic Robo, written by Mike Olson with contributions from both Clevinger and Wegener. The game uses an implementation of Evil Hat's own Fate Core system, and is a standalone game.

In 2015, the game was nominated for an Origins Award for Best Role Playing Game and for an ENnie Award for Best Game, and won the Silver ENnie Award for Best Family Game.

In 2016, Evil Hat published Majestic 12, a supplement for Atomic Robo: The Roleplaying Game, written by Olson and Clevinger, with several pieces of new art by Wegener.
