= Pixel (webcomic) =

Webcomic by Chris Dlugosz

- Author: Chris Dlugosz
- Website: http://pixelcomic.net/
- Current status/schedule: Not updating
- Launch date: June 14, 2002

Pixel is a webcomic written by Chris Dlugosz, first published on June 14, 2002. It is set in the aptly named "pixel universe", inhabited by pixels, voxels, vectors, plasmas (a satire on the plasma screens used by Apple computers), and polygons. The comic is known for its very literal sense of humor, and its constant breaks of the fourth wall. The text of the comic is written entirely in upper case with very little punctuation other than the occasional hyphen or exclamation point. Each comic comes with a short note, usually split into three lines at seemingly arbitrary points. These are also written in capitals with no punctuation, and usually explain or expand upon the strip.

Material from Pixel is included in Attitude 3: The New Subversive Online Cartoonists.

== Development ==
Chris Dlugosz initially started Pixel in 2002 as a response to sprite comics, which were proliferating at the time. In an interview in 2006, Dlugosz stated that he began posting Pixel as a "casual gag" to make fun of the sprite comic genre, and that the logistics of his Pixel universe expanded over time. Dlugosz was primarily inspired by Calvin and Hobbes, which he described as "the sole reason [he] was not afraid to occasionally get rhetorical or philosophical in some of [his] own strips." Dlugosz was introduced to the webcomic format by Penny Arcade, which he also listed as an influence. His visual style, however, is entirely different, as the world of Pixel is populated with anthropomorphic geometric shapes.

When creating a Pixel strip, Dlugosz always starts with the script, as he finds that text has "the annoying tendency to cover up much of your art." Meanwhile, he describes "interesting visual effects" as a "side hobby" of his. Dlugosz has a text file on his computer in which he keeps a list of ideas for new strips, though he noted that jokes that hit him spontaneously often make for better strips than those he thought about for longer periods of time. Dlugosz uses a template file, consisting of a blue block and a red block (pixels) standing in front of a green horizon and blue sky. He then uses a random number generator in order to produce two web colors with which to color in the two pixels, before entering the text and other effects.

== Cast ==
=== Pixels ===
Pixels are the main focus of the strip. They're square, genderless and monochromatic. Every pixel is of a different 24-bit colour, and there is a pixel of every colour, so there are exactly 16,777,216 of them at any given time. A pixel's first name is his colour value in hexadecimal (e.g. 0000FF), and his second name is this same value in binary (e.g.. 000000000000000011111111). Although pixels can die, they are instantly reborn as infants, usually to a parent of a similar colour. There is no pregnancy, and any pixel can give birth at any moment. Birth is painless, and merely involves an infant appearing near his parent. Infants are smaller than adult pixels, with rounded corners which quickly sharpen.

Pixels do not have limbs or faces, but they can manipulate objects by mild telekinesis. Some of them wear clothes, but usually this is limited to a tie, collar and shirt pocket (without a shirt).

Although there are only 2^{24} of them, pixels can create composite images by screencapping themselves (that is, creating non-living temporary duplicates).

In one minor story arc, some pixels managed to achieve transparency (became 32-bit). As of strip No. 265, this ability still exists.

=== Voxels ===
A voxel is the three-dimensional equivalent of a pixel, being cubic and able to move in the Z-axis. Their births differ from those of the pixels in that the child grows inside the parent until they are of equal size, at which point the parent dies and another voxel becomes pregnant with the recently deceased.

=== Polygons ===
Polygons are uniformly triangular, and although they are two-dimensional, they have the ability to rotate in three dimensions. They are constantly taking part in jousting matches, in which two polygons attempt to bisect each other. This is also their means of procreation, as the two parts of the loser each become an infant polygon. Unlike the other races, they are silent. Their means of communication is via "saying" images to one another. Unlike the images "said" by voxels, their word-images are well-drawn and well-defined.

=== Vectors ===
Vectors in the pixel universe aren't vectors per se; they are quadrilaterals described by vectors. Like pixels, they are limited to two dimensions. In the comic, vectors are displayed with control boxes and a central anchor point similar to those used in graphics editors such as Photoshop. Each one is capable of changing these vectors at whim, allowing them to shape-shift and fly. They are belligerent and not very bright. Vectors do not have a known means of procreation, aside from Vectorball, which appears similar to basketball. They have also been noted to have the ability to shrink to microscopic size. It is not known what consequences this development will bring.

=== Plasmas ===
Plasmas are similar to pixels in size, shape, and reproductivity, although their corners are rounded like those of an infant. Actual infants are spherical. They use blank DVDs for many things, including coffee mugs. They represent the Mac user from the perspective of the PC user.

== History ==
Pixel went on hiatus in 2007 from May 13 until November 9, when he altered the design and layout of the website itself. A second hiatus began in February 2008, with one last strip having been posted in September 2012.
