= Planet Karen =

Webcomic by Karen Ellis

- Author: Karen Ellis
- Website: http://planetkaren.girl-wonder.org/
- Current status/schedule: On hiatus since 27 September 2011
- Launch date: 2006-05-01
- Genre(s): Autobiographical, Slice-of-life

Planet Karen is an autobiographical slice-of-life webcomic written and drawn by Karen Ellis. It centers on Karen, the author, who is a goth woman of unspecified age (probably somewhere in her early or mid-twenties) and resident of Bristol, England and her daily life. It is written in a diary style with one strip for every day uploaded approximately two weeks after the day.

The comic began its run on 1 March 2006, updating almost daily; a year later (strip #314) it had an average of 11 to 12,000 hits a day. Several strips have been used as teaching aids in Cingular Wireless's Do I.T. Right magazine.

Planet Karen has been praised by renowned DC Comics writer Gail Simone as one of the most delightful things on the Web. In an interview with Newsarama, Simone listed Planet Karen on her list of Ten Things She's Diggin':

PLANET KAREN: A webcomic with everything; heart, brains, humor, drama, and more, created by gifted fangirl Karen Ellis. It's worth starting at the beginning, but the strip has been even more compelling lately as Karen struggles with a serious health problem. Go read it, you'll thank me.

— Gail Simone

It was also featured in Comics International's Top Ten Comics of 2006 ranked at #1.

In October 2009 a book was published by Soaring Penguin collecting the first 200 strips, entitled Planet Karen: First Contact, which included an introduction by Simone. A second collection, Planet Karen: Second Thoughts, was published in the fall of 2011.

== Synopsis ==
The comic shows bits and pieces of Karen's life. It began on 1 March 2006 as a printed mini-comic sold through local distribution channels, and later also became available in the webcomic format. During the second half of 2006 the author dropped the print-run entirely because the comic turned out to be much more successful on the internet.

Regular themes are the author's relation to others, her friends and romantic interests, her struggles with work, her landlord and her surroundings, failing electronic devices, psychological issues, and how she reacts to and interacts with all these people, things and occurrences. The creation and drawing of the comic itself is also a frequent recurring theme and since the comic is in diary style the author directly addresses her diary and the reader regularly and no consistent fourth wall is maintained.

== Main characters ==
=== Karen ===
Karen is the main focus of this comic. She is a goth woman of unspecified age (probably somewhere in her early or mid-twenties) and lives in Bristol, England.

She has black hair. As far as one can tell from the comic, she is of average or below-average height. Although she is not obese, she wants to lose weight and has visited a diet clinic in 2006 and managed to lose at least 8 pounds (strip #83).

She is an independent artist who currently works part-time as the receptionist at a cemetery, but is usually short on money. This webcomic was obviously the catalyst that helped her develop her artistic personality into a full-blown passion for art and comic creation. She even dreams in comic panels from time to time. In 2006 she wanted to apply for art college, but missed the deadline. Her daily life is otherwise ridden with obstacles, her unhelpful landlord and other stupid people doing their best to make her life harder than necessary.

Her personality traits include a "kiss my ass" attitude and assertiveness (which is possibly at least in part owed to past life experiences and personal insecurities), but she is an overall amicable character and often shows amazing strength in facing hardships life presents her with. She has a sizeable circle of friends, plays the bass guitar in a band and seems to be well liked by others, yet she periodically lives through stretches of time where she feels isolated, and sometimes also shows signs of severe depression.

She often lives out a very hedonistic side of herself, which she uses to balance out the madness life imposes on her. She sometimes (although not constantly) indulged in eating chocolate and in drinking alcohol, until she fell ill and was diagnosed as diabetic in late December 2006. Her favourite alcoholic beverage seems to be vodka. At the start of the comic she also was a regular cigarette smoker, but in strip #36 she decided to stop smoking out of financial pressure, and after some struggle is now a non-smoker.

She is a fan of the British TV series Doctor Who (strip #256 among others), and has expressed disinterest in football (soccer) during the 2006 FIFA World Cup (strip #102).

In February 2009 her house burned down, and she was left homeless for a month before finding a new place to live.

=== Mari ===
Apparently Karen's closest friend, Mari is taller than Karen, blonde, and shares Karen's fashion sense, general tastes and lifestyle. The strip shows Mari conversing and interacting with Karen, but offers no background information about her.

== Secondary characters ==
David
A friend of Karen who she goes to movies with and share a good time. A kind of fatherly figure, he wears a beard, pullovers and trenchcoat. David comes by and brings food, for example salami, which Karen likes very much.

Doris
An old mannequin Karen rescued from a junk store. She doubles as wardrobe and Christmas tree. She did not survive the fire of 2009.

== Style ==
=== Format ===
Most of the time, the comic uses a four-panel format (arranged as two columns and two rows) with each panel of equal size, although exceptions have occurred on occasion.

=== Duration ===
The author states explicitly and repeatedly that each comic will cover events from a single, distinct day. Since the comic does more or less update daily it progresses in real time, with about 10 to 20 days delay between the day depicted and the publication of the corresponding strip. However, for the first 143 strips the corresponding days are not revealed. From strip 144 on each strip has the date of the corresponding day revealed as mouseover and in the archive. From strip 183 on the date of the corresponding day is noted in the lower right corner of each strip.

The events in one strip can range from minutes to 24 hours and follow no specific regular pattern but are generally located in the same day.
