= Si Juki =

Indonesian comic series by Faza Ibnu Ubaidillah Salman

- Physical cover of Si Juki: Lika-Liku Anak Kos (2016)
- Author: Faza Meonk
- Website: sijuki.com
- Genre(s): Humor; Slice of life

Si Juki is an Indonesian comic series created and authored by Faza Ibnu Ubaidillah Salman or Faza Meonk. Originally published as a webcomic in 2010, the comics follow its namesake character Juki, a deviant young adult male throughout a variety of humorous scenarios and adventures. Published in both print and WEBTOON in addition to various social media platforms, an animated movie has been released based on the series in 2017. an animated series called Si Juki Anak Kosan has been released on Indonesian Disney+ Hotstar on 29 January 2021 and it became the first Indonesian animated series featured on Disney+ Hotstar.

== Publication history ==
In 2010, Faza created his first comic, initially titled DKV 4 in form of a 4-panel comic. In these early publications, the main character was named Marzuki (from which the nickname Juki was derived). At that time, he was a student of visual communication (Indonesian: Desain Komunikasi Visual) at Bina Nusantara University, and the comic was a satire of student life in said faculty. After his work gained popularity on his own Facebook page and in the online community Kaskus, Faza decided to put his comic to print in 2011, titling it Ngampus!!! Buka-bukaan Aib Mahasiswa. The comic was well-received and Faza went on to focus on the series, publishing several books and extending its social media reach. By the end of 2016, Si Juki had had 20 titles, 15 of them in print.

Due to the title's popularity, WEBTOON contacted Faza to publish Si Juki in 2015. The first title released on the site was Si Juki: Lika-Liku Anak Kos. Later that year, Si Juki won the Global Popularity Award for non-Korean webtoons on the platform. In 2016, it was revealed that the series was to be adapted into an animated movie featuring high-profile voice actors such as Bunga Citra Lestari and comedian Indro Warkop. The movie, titled Si Juki The Movie: Panitia Hari Akhir, was released on 28 December 2017.

== Style ==
Initially taking manga drawing courses in junior high school, Faza later studied to be an animator and his designs were initially made through graphic software instead of with pen and paper. Juki's bucktoothed, large-eyed design was meant to make him an iconic, easy-to-recognize character. In the comic, Juki's behavior and style are commonly described as "anti-mainstream", which is also commonly used to describe the series. In an interview with SWA, Faza stated that he wanted to create a unique style, distinct from both western-style comics and local titles such as Si Unyil. According to Faza, he based the humor in Si Juki on SpongeBob SquarePants' all-age humor.

== Reception ==
Si Juki's first title on WEBTOON, Lika Liku Anak Kos, had over 600,000 followers. As of 2018, 5 Si Juki titles are accessible in WEBTOON. Two of the printed books Berani Beda and Berani Gagal sold over 100,000 copies altogether. Faza stated in 2015 that his nine-man team earned about Rp 60 million (USD 4,250) per month from the comic. Si Juki The Movie received over 300,000 audiences in its first four days of screening. Si Juki-themed stickers has also been released for Facebook Messenger and LINE, the latter receiving over a million downloads within two days. An inspired mobile game for iOS and Android was released in 2016.
