= The Wormworld Saga =

2010 fantasy webcomic

- Author(s): Daniel Lieske
- Website: wormworldsaga.com
- Launch date: 24 December 2010
- Genre(s): Fantasy

The Wormworld Saga is a webcomic and graphic novel series by German graphics artist Daniel Lieske. Styled after 1980s fantasy films and Studio Ghibli films, the first chapter of the webcomic was published on Christmas Eve 2010. The Wormworld Saga presents the story of Jonas, a child who makes his way through a magical portal and finds himself lost in a fantasy world. Lieske is supported largely through Kickstarter, and The Wormworld Saga has been translated and published in various countries.

== Synopsis ==
The Worldworld Saga features the story of Jonas, a child who escapes into his vivid daydreams while reeling from the loss of his mother. After making his way through a magical portal inside his grandmother's strange painting, Jonas finds himself lost in a fantasy world, unable to return. Here, the child finds a giant dragon trapped inside of a mountain, and a mysterious Firelord who rises from the fires of Worm Mountain.

== Development ==
Unlike most webcomics, Lieske releases The Wormworld Saga in large one-chapter chunks, finishing one to four chapters per year. Each chapter of The Wormworld Saga is presented as a continuous scroll, inspired by Scott McCloud's infinite canvas. The first chapter of Lieske's webcomic went live during Christmas 2010, and reached over a quarter-million views and translations into various languages within a month after launch. The Wormworld Saga is styled after 1980s fantasy films such as The Neverending Story and The Goonies, and is also strongly influenced by Studio Ghibli films like Princess Mononoke and Spirited Away. Lieske originally planned for the entire saga to be between 45 and 60 chapters.

In March 2011, Lieske launched a Kickstarter crowdfunding campaign to raise money for an iOS and Android app to showcases the artwork of the webcomic. Lieske posted chapters 3, 4, and 5 of The Wormworld Saga in 2012 and 2013 before being forced to put the project on hiatus and switch to freelance work. The revenue stream of the webcomic did not yield enough for Lieske to continue working on it until a French publisher picked up his book. Lieske released chapter 6 of The Wormworld Saga in August, 2014, and at this point the mobile app proved insufficient for Lieske's needs. Taking the app down, Lieske launched a Kickstarter campaign to fund the production of a first volume of The Wormworld Saga in print, containing chapters 1–3. This campaign reached more than triple its goal after 1071 backers pledged $44,089. This first volume contains chapters 1–3. A Kickstarter campaign for The Wormworld Saga Book Edition Volume 2 was launched on April 12, 2015. The campaign reached its goal of $18,000 on April 15, 2015. On May 12, 2015 the campaign ended successfully, after 940 backers pledged $46,049. This volume contains chapters 4–5.

In May 2018, Lion Forge Comics began publishing The Wormworld Saga in print in the United States.
