= Concerned =

2005 parody webcomic

Concerned The Half-Life and Death of Gordon Frohman
- The logo for the webcomic Concerned Gordon Frohman arriving in City 17 as Doctor Breen broadcasts to the masses from a large screen, in the title frame of the first chapter
- Author: Christopher C. Livingston
- Website: screencuisine.net/hlcomic/archive
- Current status/schedule: Completed; Previously updated every Monday, Wednesday, and Friday (until August 24, 2006), and every Tuesday and Thursday (after August 24, 2006).
- Launch date: May 1, 2005
- End date: November 6, 2006
- Genre(s): Parody, comedy

Concerned: The Half-Life and Death of Gordon Frohman is a webcomic by Christopher C. Livingston that parodies the first-person shooter video game Half-Life 2. The comic is illustrated with screenshots of characters posed using Garry's Mod, a tool which allows manipulation of the Source engine used by Half-Life 2. The comic ran from May 2005 to November 2006 and had 205 issues.

While Half-Life 2 follows protagonist Gordon Freeman in a dystopian future, Concerned follows "Gordon Frohman", a dangerously clumsy character who arrives in the setting of the game a few weeks before Freeman does. The webcomic's dark humor is derived from its contrasts with the game and through references to the game's shortcomings. On several occasions in the comic, Frohman becomes the cause of various disastrous circumstances that Freeman will later encounter.

Several reviews of Concerned praised the attention to writing and presentation and the comic's humor. Livingston also reported positive reception from staff at Valve, the developer company of Half-Life 2, who were pleased to have a comic based on their game. In 2014, Livingston began work as a writer for PC Gamer.

== Background ==
Christopher Livingston started working on Concerned as a hobby. He had previously considered developing a webcomic that would parallel the storyline of the original 1987 Legend of Zelda, for the Nintendo Entertainment System, from start to finish. He chose the Half-Life 2 game world as the scene for his comic because he was a fan, and because the availability of Garry's Mod eliminated the need to draw by hand. He always intended the plot of the comic to end at the same point as the game.

Livingston thought a comic would be a good way to introduce humor to the game, which he has described as "mysterious, moody, [and] immersive".

Well, I thought Half-Life 2 was a great game, but there simply weren't enough jokes about toilets in it. So, I thought a comic would be a good place to get some humor into the game. I came up with the idea for Frohman, a complete idiot, to play all the way through the game, just like Freeman only instead of being a hero, he'd be a complete fool.

— Christopher C. Livingston

== Publication history ==
The first issue of Concerned was released on May 1, 2005, the comic completing its run on November 6, 2006 with a total of 205 issues. The characters in the comic were posed using Garry's Mod, a tool which facilitates manipulation of the Source engine used by Half-Life 2, and the comic frames were assembled using Photoshop 6. (Note: Information regarding the software used in the development of the comic can be found at the bottom of any page from www.screencuisine.net/hlcomic.)

The webcomic derives its name from one of the propaganda broadcasts by Wallace Breen in Half-Life 2, in which he is reading a letter supposedly written by a citizen, signed 'Sincerely, a concerned citizen', and begins his response with 'Thank you for writing, Concerned'. Throughout the comic the main character, Gordon Frohman, sends several similar letters to Dr. Breen, Livingston's intention being to suggest that Frohman was the author of the letter read by Breen in Half-Life 2. The name "Frohman" is derived from the last name of Gordon Freeman, the protagonist of the Half-Life series. According to the credits on the comic's website, this name was suggested to Livingston by Sam Golgert, an acquaintance of his.

Livingston also employed the assistance of other people, notably Michael Clements, founder of the Half-Life 2 comics repository PHWOnline, and author of SKETCH, another comic based on Half-Life 2. Clements aided him in enhancing the presentation of Concerned. Greg Galcik, who started and maintained the website SpinnWebe, also assisted in site maintenance, and Livingston later offered him a "guest week special", in which Galcik wrote and published three issues for Concerned. A similar set of three issues have also been published by Joe Yuska, during a week when Livingston was unavailable.

As stated by Livingston in several interviews, his relation with Valve, the developer company of Half-Life 2, was a good one, the company being pleased to have a comic based on their game. According to Livingston, Valve also intended to collaborate with him to produce printed copies of Concerned. However, this was never finalized as the resolution of the comics was too low for printing.

Livingston did not continue the comic through Half-Life 2: Episode One, the first of an episodic series following Half-Life 2, as the game "doesn't really lend itself to the type of comic [he wants] to do".

== Synopsis ==
=== Background ===
In Half-Life 2, the player takes on the role of Dr. Gordon Freeman. Throughout the game, the player follows the story of a dark, dystopian future in which mankind has been enslaved by the Combine, a mysterious alien enemy. In contrast, Concerned follows the same general path through the story established by Half-Life 2, but instead follows the adventures of Gordon Frohman, a hapless, lethally clumsy oaf who arrives in City 17 a few weeks before Freeman. Frohman is incredibly naïve and, unlike the other citizens, seems to enjoy living under the rule of the totalitarian administrator, Dr. Breen, and the Combine. He holds an insane reverence for the latter, even going to the point of having a plush doll of a Combine soldier.

=== Plot ===
The early phases of the comic have Frohman excitedly arriving in City 17. Eventually he takes a job at the Combine's headquarters, the Citadel, under a Combine Elite named Mr. Henderson. As most of his human colleagues become Combine soldiers, he realizes that Henderson has no immediate intention to do the same for him, citing his incompetence. Demanding to become one with the Combine, Frohman willingly sets off to Nova Prospekt, an alien security and detention installation, for invasive surgery to convert him. Meanwhile, he selects Ravenholm as a residence where he can commute to and from City 17, but lacks proper transport with which to get there. After a failed attempt to reach Ravenholm using Dr. Isaac Kleiner's teleporter leaves him stuck in a Counter-Strike: Source server for a week, he seeks Ravenholm by foot instead. Traveling through City 17's canals, Frohman arrives, badly injured and dazed, at Black Mesa East, the headquarters of the human resistance, where he is welcomed as a helper. His stay there is cut short because he causes trouble in the base, and also irritatingly overuses the gravity gun. He is fooled into leaving the base, and finally heads toward and reaches Ravenholm.

On Frohman's arrival, Ravenholm is depicted as a peaceful, bright, and cheerful place devoid of any Combine elements, but "terrorized" by Father Grigori. After adjusting, Gordon becomes accustomed to the town, but unintentionally discloses the town's location to Dr. Breen, who immediately orders his forces to "bomb the shit out of them". The town is fired on with headcrabs, killing many and turning others into zombies. Frohman himself is attacked by a headcrab and turns into a zombie too, yet retains his free will; and after a while his headcrab dies of malnutrition, which is attributed to his lack of intelligence. With Father Grigori's help, Frohman escapes Ravenholm, now the zombie-infested nightmare seen when Freeman visits it in the game, and presses on to Nova Prospekt. After surviving several more hazards, he reaches the coast. Here, after passing the final resistance base and an Antlion-infested beach, Frohman encounters an Antlion Guard, which is killed by a Vortigaunt, an alien race helping the humans in the game. This allows Frohman to retrieve bugbait from the dead creature, with which he can control the Antlions.

Frohman, accompanied by several bugbait-controlled Antlions, eventually reaches Nova Prospekt, only to be turned away as he does not have an appointment. He gives up and returns to City 17 in the following strip, as Gordon Freeman finally arrives in the city, linking the comic's time frame with the start of Half-Life 2. He is then drafted into the resistance after failing to disrupt its operations, and unintentionally signals the start of the resistance's uprising after one of his Antlions accidentally kills a Combine police officer. During the fighting, he accompanies Freeman himself and mingles with resistance members, aids the Combine in the capture of Alyx Vance, one of Freeman's allies, and reunites with Norman Frohman, his long-lost assassin twin brother, only to promptly witness his death at the hands of a Strider, a large tripodal assault synth.

Following this, Gordon returns to the Citadel, unwillingly aiding Freeman in his journey up the Citadel and influencing the plot of the game. As Freeman is pursuing Dr. Breen to his teleporter, Frohman is about to kill Freeman—but he pauses to come up with the perfect one-liner for the occasion, causing him to run out of time; Dr. Breen's teleporter explodes and Frohman is flung off the Citadel peak by the explosion. Dr. Breen also survives, having fallen from the Citadel onto a pile of dead Combine soldiers. However, Frohman falls right onto Breen, killing him. Gordon himself is only seriously injured. Baffled by his ability to survive, he realizes through a flashback that he has been under "Buddha Mode", a cheat code which prevents his health points from dropping below one throughout the comic's duration. Frohman inadvertently turns off the mode, and even spoils an opportunity to be rescued by a group of Vortigaunts, as both Gordon Freeman and Alyx Vance are at the start of Episode One. In the end, Frohman dies unceremoniously, with survivors of the City 17 uprising finding his dead body before moving on.

== Themes ==
The protagonist of the comic asks how it is possible for him to pick up objects without using his hands, a reference to the player's hands not being visible in Half-Life 2 when holding anything other than weapons.

Livingston stated that the comic was a good way of pointing out several shortcomings of video games and first-person shooters in particular. He emphasized the presence of various objects throughout the levels of games which were intended to aid the player, but would have little chance of being found in the real world in a similar manner.

There's a lot of elements about video games to poke fun of, especially in first-person shooters, which all have a lot of things in common, such as health kits, ammo, and barrels filled with explosive material strewn about levels for no practical, real-world reason. It just seemed like a good setting to make jokes.

— Christopher C. Livingston

Much of the comic's dark humor is derived from its contrasts with Half-Life 2: in a depressing, dark vision of a conquered humanity's future, Gordon Freeman becomes a hero and savior; the similarly named Gordon Frohman, on the other hand, is just an average person, improbably cheerful to the point of stupidity, and somewhat naïve as to what is actually going on around him. For instance, Frohman fails to realize that his return-addressed letters to Doctor Breen reveal his location, and so result in that location being invaded, bombed, or otherwise compromised.

The comic contains many references to events and objects in the game. In one comic, Frohman makes a clerical error that causes the Combine to order far too many explosive barrels, thus suggesting an explanation for the barrels' ubiquity throughout City 17 and beyond. In another, he writes a letter to Dr. Breen asking why using his flashlight reduces his ability to run, a reference to Half-Life 2's flashlight and sprint functions using the same power source. In a further strip, the town of Ravenholm becomes the headcrab-infested ghost town seen in Half-Life 2 after Frohman writes to Breen expressing his happiness with being there, giving away Ravenholm's location. Indeed, Frohman causes (intentionally or accidentally) many of the disastrous circumstances that Gordon Freeman runs across. He accidentally gives Breen the idea of headcrab shells while on a radio, and sets up all of the traps in Ravenholm himself in an attempt to catch Father Grigori.

It is also revealed that, at the Black Mesa Research Facility, Frohman causes the resonance cascade that allows for alien forces to invade in Half-Life by accidentally delivering a wedge of cheese, instead of the intended test sample, to the test chamber where the cascade flashpoints. Half-Life: Decay, however, indicates that Dr. Gina Cross is responsible for this task. Livingston admitted he did not play Decay, and thus was not aware of its storyline. He also stated that the comic takes place in the PC version of the Half-Life continuity, and since Half-Life: Decay was never published for the PC, it does not affect the comic.

== Reception ==
The comic has had positive reception from both the public and editors of various gaming magazines. The Globe and Mail stated the comic "stands out from most other gamics (comics consisting of game screenshots) by virtue of the quality of its writing and presentation". Online magazine GGL.com said that "Concerned is one of the funnier online gaming comics, and perhaps the best single-game parody in the bunch", and The Irish Gamers described Concerned as a "hit webcomic". Computer Gaming World called the comic "funny" and featured two exclusive three panel comics not found anywhere else, while PC Zone described it as "mildly amusing". The comic had also caught the attention of reviewers outside the United States and the United Kingdom; the Romanian magazine Level said the comic is "a recommendation to every fan of the game and anyone looking for a good daily laugh".
