= Jonathan Rosenberg (artist) =

Webcomic artist (born 1973)

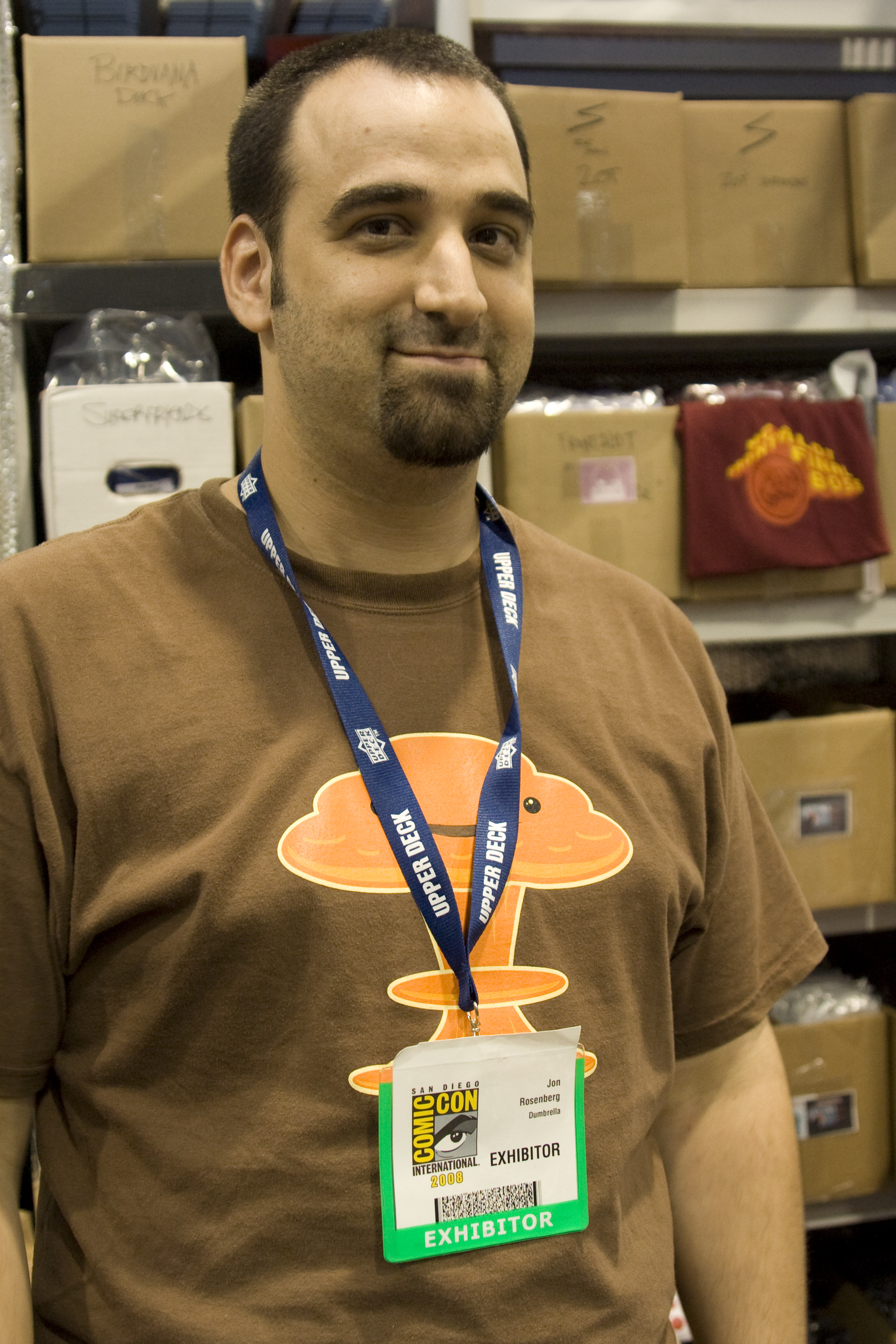
- At the 2008 Comic-Con, photo by pinguino k from North Hollywood, USA
- Born: November 27, 1973 (age 52); New York City, United States
- Occupation: Cartoonist
- Known for: Goats webcomic (1997-present); Scenes from a Multiverse webcomic (2010-present)
- Spouse: Amy Melnikoff

Jonathan Rosenberg (born November 27, 1973) is the webcomic artist responsible for Goats, Scenes from a Multiverse and megaGAMERZ 3133T. Rosenberg has been producing webcomics since 1997, making him one of the original webcomic artists. When the National Cartoonists Society added a new category, Online Comic Strips, in 2011, Rosenberg was the first winner.

Rosenberg graduated from Cornell University in 1995 with a major in biology. Before working full-time as a webcomic artist, he also worked as a website design consultant. On January 19, 2003, Rosenberg married graphic designer/printmaker and fellow Cornell alum Amy Melnikoff. In August 2006, the Rosenbergs moved from their Manhattan apartment to a house in Westchester County, New York. Because he was living in Manhattan at the time, Rosenberg's early work also tended to be set predominantly in this location. Later works branched off into real and imagined locations vastly disjointed from his previous comics.

== Works ==
- Goats - Started April 1, 1997, Rosenberg placed it on hiatus on April 30, 2010. He ran a successful Kickstarter campaign in February 2012 to fund the publishing of Goats book IV and to finish the story. As of August 2014, the Goats website has been relaunched but no merchandise or new comics have been delivered.
- Scenes from a Multiverse - This strip started on June 14, 2010, and is updated semi-daily on weekdays (updates were daily, Monday through Friday, initially). Early on, readers could vote each Friday which of the week's strips would be continued on the following Friday, but voting was suspended indefinitely in December 2012. The comic is partly funded through Patreon since December 2013. The comic has been dormant since August 14, 2021.
- megaGAMERZ 3133T - written under the name Diablo, who is a Satanic chicken and a character in Goats. The strip began in June 2005, and it was discontinued in June 2006. The site currently loops through previous comics in linear sequence. It heavily parodies template-made gaming comics, in spite of not having much of a gaming focus. megaGAMERZ 3133T is currently (November 2013) on hiatus.
- Team Force Alpha. A planned journal comic, described by Rosenberg in 2006 as the project after Goats.
- Joke web sites, including Moon the White House, Moistnap, Brains 4 Zombies and Stoolfairy.
- Sundry guest strips

== Publications ==
- Goats: Showcase Showdown (The Infinite Pendergast Cycle) - May 2010. ISBN 0-345-51094-1.
- Goats: The Corndog Imperative (The Infinite Pendergast Cycle) - December 2009. ISBN 0-345-51093-3.
- Goats: Infinite Typewriters (The Infinite Pendergast Cycle) - June 2009. ISBN 0-345-51092-5.
- Goats: Inhuman Resources (The Infinite Pendergast Cycle) - June 2013. ISBN 978-1-936561-07-0.
- Tasty Yet Morally Ambiguous: Goats, Volume I & II - Dec 2003. ISBN 1-59151-011-2.
- Evil Chickens Don't Kiss: Goats, Volume III - Aug 2002. ISBN 1-59151-031-7.
- Behold the Power of Ignorance: Goats, Volume IV - Nov 2001. ISBN 1-59151-041-4.
- Scenes from a Multiverse book 1
- Business Animals: Scenes from a Multiverse book 2
- Greetings from bunny's planet, scenes from a multiverse

== Appearances in other webcomics ==
Rosenberg has occasionally appeared as a character in other webcomics, particularly as Mr. Jon Rosenberg in Jeffrey Rowland's Overcompensating. That incarnation of Rosenberg's comic alter ego apparently has jewelry in his intestinal system and was fake-killed by Dayfree Press.

== Awards ==
- 2011 National Cartoonists Society Online Comic Strip Award
