= Unsounded =

Webcomic

- Cover image of issue 1
- Author: Ashley Cope
- Website: casualvillain.com
- Current status/schedule: Complete
- Launch date: July 14, 2010
- Genre(s): Fantasy, Comedy, Dark humor, Action, Horror, Drama

Unsounded is an epic fantasy adventure graphic novel written and illustrated by Ashley Cope, published online from 2010 to 2025. A sequel, The Red Cost, was announced upon the comic's conclusion and began serialization in January 2026. Unsounded describes itself as covering "fall[ing] into the Epic Fantasy Adventure genre, with occasional forays into the horrific, the profane, and the goofy". It follows the lion-tailed daughter of a crime lord, Sette Frummagem, as accompanied by the undead soldier Duane Adelier.

== Overview ==
=== Setting ===
Unsounded takes place in the fictional continent of Kasslyne, which is dominated by the two superpowers Cresce and Alderode, who exist in a perpetual state of on and off war with one another. Cresce's system of government is a mixture of Communism and Monarchy, and it exerts a large sphere of influence over most of Kasslyne. Alderode is a mysterious and insular country whose populace is divided into a supernatural caste system denoted by hair color. The castes of Alderode have wildly varying lifespans that are inversely proportional to their magical abilities. A third minor superpower, the highly corrupt and capitalist Sharteshane, influences and profits from the Cresce-Alderode war. Kasslyne also features fictional species: "Inak", intelligent humanoids with traits of reptiles; and strange immortal beings known as "Senet beasts", who are believed to be creatures from the gods' first attempt at creation.

The Cresce-Alderode war is partly fueled by a conflict between the two dominant religions of Kasslyne: The Gefendur, who believe the world is overseen by two sets of twin gods, and the Ssaelit, who believe a man named Ssael slew the Gefendur gods and took their place. Ssaelism is heavily persecuted outside of Alderode, where it exists in an uneasy compromise with the Aldish Gefendur.

Kasslyne is governed not by the laws of physics, but by an invisible spectral plane known as "the khert". Trained individuals can use pymary (a type of magic) to manipulate the khert into altering objects' properties such as temperature, weight, and contour. The author has stated this magic system was inspired by her experiences utilizing console commands in video games. The organs and bodily secretions of Senet beasts, called "First Materials", contain their own khert systems separate from the universal one, allowing them to be enchanted with special pymaric effects that form the backbone of Kasslynian technology. The khert also preserves the memories of all humans upon death, which can be captured and used to create artificial intelligence through a process known as "sounding". The Gefendur and Ssaelit believe that the gods reside in a deep portion of the khert known as the "Great Unsounded", so called because no sounder has ever found it.

The author deliberately eschews pinning the technology and costume design to a specific time period, stating "Unsounded cannot contain anachronisms; it doesn't take place in our world nor anywhere along its timeline." Cope has referred to the setting's aesthetic as "pymary-tech" in contrast to conventional genres such as steampunk and dieselpunk.

=== Plot ===
Sette Frummagem, a Sharteshanian girl, is tasked by her father, the crime lord Nary-a-Care, to extort tribute from her cousin Stockyard, a black sheep of the family who has started his own business in the country of Cresce. Duane Adelier, an Aldish undead scrivener and skilled mage, is forced to accompany her as a bodyguard despite his hatred of Cresce. On their way to Cresce, the duo clashes with the Red Berry Boys, a group of criminals who disembowel kidnapped children and replace their organs with a supernatural material. This brings them in conflict with an elite Crescian peacekeeping squad headed by a Captain Emil Toma and Lieutenant Elka, who mistakenly believe Duane and Sette are in league with the Red Berry Boys.

Upon arriving in Cresce, Sette discovers that Duane's shadow allows her to bodily enter the khert, where she sees a memory of the day Duane died. Duane was a prominent member of the Ssaelit clergy with two children, but he was assassinated by Crescian agitators, with his daughter Mikaila also dying in the melee. This causes Sette to realize Duane is a real person and not an artificial intelligence like she believed, leading to her treating him with more empathy.

Upon reaching Stockyard, he reveals Sette's father lied to her about the true nature of her mission, which involves using Duane and the Red Berry Boys to craft a First Material superweapon that will upset the delicate balance of power between Cresce and Alderode. Though he imprisons Sette and Duane, the superweapon "detonates" prematurely underneath his headquarters, spawning an enormous monster composed of the bodies of the Red Berry Boys' victims. The superweapon is revealed to have been created by "Cutter", a misanthropic inak who seeks to use the weapon to destroy the memories recorded by the khert. With the help of the Crescian Peaceguard and Mathis Quigley, a former employee of the Red Berry Boys, Sette is able to defeat the monster by pushing it into the nearby river, but Stockyard and many of his employees are killed.

While the group recuperates, Kima Bell, Lord General of the Crescian military, is revealed to be the commissioner of the superweapon; he orders the town razed to cover up the superweapon's premature emergence. Emil and Elka discover there is a traitorous faction within the military who seek to depose the current queen of Cresce and raise Bell to the throne, forcing them to go rogue. Sette, Duane, Mathis, and Mathis' young son Matty narrowly escape the town's destruction with the help of Uaid, a large construct designed by Mathis' late wife.

Political tensions rise as Maharaishala Sonorie, the queen of Cresce, marries an Aldish rebel named Roger Foi-Hellick. However, this is a ruse to "dissect" his soul with the help of the Black Tongues, an amoral group of pymaric researchers, and a Senet beast named Ruckmearkha. Roger is the subject of the "Etalarche curse", which magically compels Aldishmen to irrationally hate the subject. Roger believes that examining the curse's effect on his soul will give Sonorie the power to bloodlessly end the Cresce-Alderode war.

Duane learns that his soul enters the khert at night, allowing him to view humanity's memories as Sette did. He is visited by Sessine, a Senet beast who is imprisoned in the khert. She claims that the khert exists outside of time and contains not only past memories but memories of events yet to come; to prove this, she shows Duane a memory of the superweapon attacking Alderode, and implores him to seek and destroy the weapon to prevent this future from coming to pass.

While following the superweapon's path down the river, the protagonists are stopped by a raging storm near a Gefendur shrine called Litriya. While they seek shelter, Emil and Elka are captured by the rebel faction. Stockyard's cousins, Anadyne and Knock-Me-Down Frummagem, are revealed to have survived the superweapon's massacre, but are trapped within its remains. Knock-Me-Down escapes, but Cutter forces Anadyne to merge with the superweapon.

Emil and Elka take advantage of the storm to escape the rebels and infiltrate the shrine. Together with Mathis and Duane, they discover a secret facility beneath the shrine where engineers are experimenting on "stormbringers", humanoid Senet beasts with the power to cause storms. The engineers used torture to force the stormbringers to create the endless storm, as it protects the shrine from Aldish airstrikes. Duane is disgusted and frees the stormbringers, but an Aldish strike force attacks as soon as the storm breaks. They are led by Lemuel, Duane's younger brother.

Duane chooses to aid the Aldish soldiers while the shrine's inhabitants retreat to a reinforced bunker. The shrine's engineer reveals to Matty that Mathis betrayed his rebellious wife to the Aldish state, resulting in her death; reeling from the revelation, Matty attempts to escape the shrine alone. The shrine's enslaved inak population attempt to bargain with the soldiers, but are met with violence; in desperation, the dying inak activate the secret facility's self-destruct spell, killing most of the soldiers but also the remaining inak. Seeing the carnage, Duane realizes the atrocity of his actions and vows to defend the shrine.

While fighting his brother, Duane realizes that Lemuel's lieutenant is Mikaila, who survived the assassination due to the help of the Black Tongue who reanimated Duane. Her miraculous survival made her a celebrity, allowing her to join the Aldish military despite patriarchal Aldish culture normally forbidding it. Duane successfully defends the shrine until the Crescian military arrives, forcing Lemuel to flee; however, Lemuel destroys Uaid during his retreat.

The Crescian border city of Grenzlan is occupied by Aldish soldiers. After they perform a spell that expands the influence of Alderode's khert, the Black Tongues launch a counterattack and retake the city on Sonorie's orders. Sette reveals that she can physically remove memories from her soul, which she has used throughout her life to forget painful memories. Cutter and Anadyne march on the city of Port Morstorben with a group of freed inak rebels, but Cutter abandons the inak once they reach the inner city, revealing his goal was only to reach the city's "khert-hub", a massive First Material that allows the monster to access the khert. At the same time, an Aldish invasion force attacks the queen's manor, resulting in the deaths of the Gefendur high priestess and the heads of the Crescian noble families, as well as severely injuring Ruckmearkha. General Bell clashes with the heroes and is killed.

Sette theorizes that since the First Material weapon is powered by bad memories, it can be defeated by good memories. Using Duane's shadow, she enters the khert once again to find happy memories she can use. While there, she discovers that she can reach into the physical world to influence events, and uses this power to assist the other heroes. However, Duane stops her from helping Queen Sonorie, resulting in a bitter argument that ends with Duane seemingly consumed by bad memories. Sette is then approached by girl who looks like Sette and a lion called Jacaranda, who carries her to Sessine.

Sessine reveals that the khert did not always store memories; this was a feature she designed with the help of a human man. The man, horrified to discover reincarnating souls did not exist, sought to create one; Sette and Jacaranda are the recipient of this "First Soul". However, while the First Soul allows souls to remain whole in the khert, it cannot retain memories when it reincarnates, instead giving birth to countless copies of Sette and Jacaranda across the ages. Sessine believes this to be a mistake, and reveals she manipulated the events of the story to bring the superweapon (which is made from her bones) to her, which will give her the power to revert her changes to the khert.

Sessine commands Sette to pull the First Material weapon into the khert, but Sette instead kills Anadyne, causing the monster to turn on Cutter. In a fit of rage, Sessine kills all the Black Tongues through a telekinetic link. The First Sette ambushes Sette and kills her, retrieving the First Soul and using its power to destroy Sessine and Jacaranda. Duane discovers Sette's dead body and is attacked by the First Sette, who plans to possess Duane's body to re-enter the living world. However, Sette's ghost arrives and defeats the First Sette. Impressed by her love for Duane, the First Soul resurrects Sette. Their reconciliation attracts a large number of happy memories, allowing Sette to succeed in her original plan of using them to repel the monster and save the city. However, Mathis dies while rescuing his son from a fragment of the First Silver monster.

Three weeks later, Queen Sonorie grants the inak a sovereign state in the ruins of Ethelmik and publicly executes Bell's remaining supporters and Roger (now in a vegetative state from the effects of Ruckmearkha's venom). Emil confesses his love for Elka, but retires from public service due to his disillusionment from recent events. Duane and Sette are under house arrest, but Sette resolves to escape and find her lost brother.

== Characters ==
Unsounded features a large ensemble cast with multiple viewpoint characters, though the main story follows Sette and Duane. Over the course of the story, additional characters join their group in their journey across the continent.

=== Protagonists ===
Sette Frummagem
The daughter of the Sharteshanian crime lord Nary-a-Care Frummagem. Abuse from her father and peers caused her to internalize a very pragmatic and cynical worldview, though she idolizes her father. She possesses several unusual physical features: She has a lion's tail and teeth, ceases to age beyond a pubescent stage, and lacks nipples, breasts, or a bellybutton. Despite these unusual traits, the setting's magic system still classifies her as human. Her unusual looks garner scorn from others, making her self-conscious.
Sette is stated by the author to be asexual.

Duane Adelier
An undead soldier who in life served in the Lions of Mercy, an elite contingent of the Aldish Ssaelit army. He is a member of the Aldish "Gold" caste, and possesses a genetic mutation that allows him to cast spells without speaking, known as "tacit casting". At night his soul leaves his body and enters the supernatural plane of the khert, leaving his body as a mindless zombie that is compelled to eat living flesh. Duane is highly nationalistic and a religious zealot, which brings him into frequent conflict with other characters.

Emil Toma née Sava
A captain of the Crescian Peaceguard who pursues the Red Berry Boys and assists the protagonists at several points. He became a national hero after saving the queen's life, allowing him to marry into the noble Toma family despite being a commoner. He loves his young daughter, but avoids home due to the shame of knowing that his wife plans to divorce him.

Tela Elka
Emil's lieutenant and a skilled spellwright. She works with Emil to investigate the Red Berry Boys, and is extremely loyal to Cresce and the Crescian queen.

Jivi Flask
The teenage son of Regina Flask, a Crescian privateer. He is initially a hostage of the Red Berry Boys, but later escapes and joins Sette's group. He becomes friends with Matty and develops a romantic crush on Sara while at Litriya Shrine, but struggles to get along with Sette.

Mathis Quigley
A member of the Aldish "Platinum" caste, who have heightened magical abilities but are limited to a lifespan of 30 years. He previously worked as a law enforcement officer for the Aldish government, but defected to Cresce after the government executed his wife for treason. This event gave him an extremely cynical and misanthropic world-view and made him severely suicidal. He struggles to care for his young son Matty, whom he is emotionally distant and sometimes even abusive towards. He is initially an employee of the Red Berry Boys, and later a member of Sette's group.

Mathis "Matty" Quigley, Jr.
Mathis' eight-year-old son. He was blinded in the attack that killed his mother, and sees through a magical prosthetic fashioned out of a toy made by his mother. Despite his trauma, he has an optimistic worldview and is quick to make friends with other characters. He sees Uaid as a brother.

Uaid
A construct fashioned from the body of a "mountain ogre", large Senet beasts whose bodies form the surface of Kasslyne. He is animated by a complex artificial intelligence constructed by Vienne Quigley that gives him a kind, childlike personality, though he cannot speak.

=== Antagonists ===
Arctrit "Starfish" Ramora
The leader of the Red Berry Boys and an employee of Stockyard. He is shown to be extremely sadistic and amoral, engaging in abuse and torture of his captives purely for his own pleasure. He deliberately uses children to fuel the superweapon because it allows him to make more money, an action which sickens even hardened criminals like Stockyard. He is a pedophile who is shown molesting his young captives, and is obsessed with Sette due to her inability to age.

Prakhuta "Cutter"
Prakhuta is an inak, a race of lizard-like humanoids historically persecuted and oppressed by humans. After experiments conducted on him by the Black Tongues, he gained an artificial human soul, allowing him to work pymary (normally an ability exclusive to humans). However, his artificial soul is composed of painful memories that he must constantly relive, which has damaging effects on his sanity. His artificial soul made him a pariah among his clan, who maimed him and branded him an outcast. His traumatic past has left him deeply cynical and misanthropic. He is responsible for designing the superweapon the protagonists pursue throughout the story.

Stockyard Frummagem
Sette's cousin and a black sheep of the Frummagem family. He runs a brothel, the Deadly Nevergreen, in the Crescian border town of Ethelmik while managing several criminal enterprises, including the Red Berry Boys. He has unrequited love for Anadyne.

Anadyne "Ana" Frummagem
Sette's cousin and a former prostitute. Her ambitions led her to follow Stockyard, who promised to tutor her in pymary in exchange for working as his second-in-command. She is caught in a love triangle between her boyfriend Toby and Stockyard, who has unrequited feelings for her. She later fuses with the superweapon, granting her immense power at the cost of her sanity.

Knock-Me-Down Frummagem
Anadyne's best friend and a former prostitute. She initially opposes the heroes as one of Stockyard's enforcers, but becomes an occasional ally after the Ethelmik plot arc, as she wishes to save Anadyne from the superweapon.

Kima Bell
Lord General of the Crescian military. He commissioned the magical superweapon the protagonists pursue throughout the story, and seeks to overthrow the Crescian queen after she refused its use. He is an extremist who believes in racist and fascist political ideology, and inflames racial tensions by instituting a pogrom against the inak.

=== Other characters ===
Vienne Quigley
Wife of Mathis and mother of Matty. Prior to her death, she worked as an artificier creating magical technologies, including Uaid. She sought to aid the March, a radical group seeking to overthrow that Aldish government, but was executed before she could complete her work. She is the viewpoint character of the short story "Vienne of Seferpine".

Elan Aled
A low-ranking member of the Crescian Peaceguard who suffers from a heart condition. He is forced to take bribes from criminals to pay for his medical care, which is provided by Bastion Winalils. He helps Sette enter Cresce, and later assists the protagonists in several battles.

Lemuel Adelier
Duane's younger brother. He was conscripted into the Aldish military at the age of 12, making him a child soldier. This traumatic experience made him a Ssaelist extremist. In the present day he is a captain in the Aldish air force, and married Duane's wife following his apparent death.

Lady Illganyag / Sessine
Sessine is an agib, a bird-like Senet beast who claims to have existed since the dawn of the world. She is the "sponsor" of the Black Tongues, an amoral group of scientists and researchers, whom she can telepathically communicate with. She is trapped in the khert, where she speaks with Duane during his nighttime visits to give him advice and direction.

Bastion Winalils
A member of the Aldish "Jet" caste, which grants him double the lifespan of a normal human but renders him unable to work pymary unless he is physically touching his target. He joined the Black Tongues at a young age and apprenticed under the amoral Delicieu, who subjected him to extreme physical and sexual abuse but taught him valuable knowledge in pymary and medicine, which he now uses to seek the secret to immortality. He is favored by Sessine, who granted him the unique ability to teleport. He cannot carry anything with him while teleporting, and must create illusory clothes using magic. He is pansexual and frequently sexually propositions other characters.

Timofey
A highly sophisticated artificial intelligence constructed by Bastion some time before the story begins. Despite displaying unique behaviors, emotions, and personality quirks, Bastion insists that as he is a construct "he has no soul; doesn't feel; never lived." Timofey can turn invisible and travel at the speed of light, but cannot physically interact with any objects. He serves as a scout and spy for Bastion, and loves poetry.

Maharaishala Sonorie
The current queen of Cresce. She faces strong political opposition from Cresce's military and nobility due to perceived weakness in her handling of the Cresce-Alderode war. She opposes the military's plan of using a magical superweapon against Alderode in favor of a secret plan that involves exploiting the unique mechanics of Alderode's khert to achieve a bloodless victory.
Maharaishala has multiple husbands, but only one of her spouses, Roger Foi-Hellick, is seen in the story.

Roger Sonorie née Foi-Hellick
A young member of the Aldish "Copper" caste, who possess centuries of lifespan but cannot work pymary. He betrayed his upper-class family to start a failed rebellion against the Aldish state, and later entered a political marriage with the queen of Cresce. For his crimes he was branded with the "Etalarche curse", which makes all Aldish citizens experience a fierce supernatural hatred towards him. He willingly subjects himself to horrific human experimentation under the belief that examining the curse's effect on his soul will reveal a weakness of the Aldish government.

Minnow
A humanoid Senet beast known as a "waterwoman" who assists the protagonists during the Litryia Shrine arc. Her love of humans makes her a pariah among her tribe, who have an adversarial relationship with humans.

Darkest Paul
A Sharteshanian man and the newest initiate of the Black Tongues. Paul is shrewd and pragmatic, causing him to act as the Black Tongues' de facto leader in their dealings with Queen Sonorie. He was previously in a romantic relationship with Bastion, but the two broke up sometime before the story begins.

Ruckmearkha "Ruck"
Ruckmearkha is an efheby, a Senet beast with the power to consume human memories using soporific venom. He is obsessed with humans and finds the experience of their memories intoxicating, but is also arrogant and contemptuous towards them. He is awakened from a long hibernation by Maharaishala, who instructs him to consume Roger's soul and assist the Black Tongues in their examination thereof. However, for his own amusement Ruck chooses to assist the queen's opponents as well.

== Art and composition ==
The top panel is drawn as if it is a physical object stacked on top of the page, and debris from the explosion spill out of the panel and into the website background. Similar techniques are used throughout the comic.

The webcomic makes frequent use of infinite canvas techniques in its pages, such as art that expands past the borders of the page, animation, audio, and integrating the background art and site buttons into the story. Many pages also feature art that "bleeds" across panels and word balloons, giving the art a sense of depth. Characters sometimes break the fourth wall through the use of these infinite canvas techniques, such as stealing objects depicted in the website's header to use in the comic. Notable examples include the background of the website appearing to burn during pages depicting a great fire, and the alt text of site buttons being replaced with in-universe propaganda during the depiction of Roger's Etalarche curse. Additionally, some pages alter the website title to convey additional information. Border-breaking art is accomplished by dividing the webpage into multiple sections for the header, footer, and border columns in HTML, allowing the default images for those sections to be replaced with special art. Animation and audio are integrated through embedded JavaScript.

Sette imagines a nonexistent boogeyman stalking her through a dark corridor, giving readers insight into her emotional state without the use of thought bubbles.

Thought bubbles are rarely shown in the comic, and only include simple images, never text. Cope instead chooses to convey character thoughts through metaphors and symbolism in the page art, encouraging readers to come up with their own interpretations of the characters' motivations and mental states. Cope considers this approach "a lot more fun" than explicit thought bubbles.

Cope draws page art together with speech balloons rather than placing speech balloons over existing art to "[Save her] from wasting time drawing stuff that's just gonna get covered by a balloon." Text is rendered using the Anime Ace 2 font.

== Publication ==
The comic was collected in a print volume independently published by Cope in November 2012, after a Kickstarter campaign intended to raise $9,000 raised over $40,000 instead, with further Kickstarter campaigns was made for a second and third volume respectively in 2014 and 2017 each raising over $70,000 against goals of $25,000 and $50,000.

The print volumes are slightly edited to adapt the infinite canvas techniques used in the webcomic.

In addition to content originally published on the website, the print volumes contain exclusive short stories and concept art. The volumes also include small one-panel illustrations at the beginning of each chapter that are not present in the webcomic version.

In June 2025, Cope announced that Iron Circus Comics would be publishing future volumes, and launched a Kickstarter campaign to print new editions of the first two volumes with more chapters and additional content.

Volume	Title	Pages	ISBN	Contents
Vol. 1	The Zombie and the Brat	184	Paperback: ISBN 978-0-615-72895-7	Webcomic chapters 1–3 "The Priestess" (short story)
Vol. 2	The Perils of Civilisation	226	Paperback: ISBN 978-0-692-27504-7	Webcomic chapters 4–6 "A Brief Introduction to the Tainish Language" Unnamed short story
Vol. 3	Thicker Than Water	314	Paperback: ISBN 978-0-692-93408-1	Webcomic chapters 7–9 "The Short Career of Kissfist Baxter" (short story)

== Other media ==
=== Short stories ===
After the first Kickstarter campaign, Cope began writing prose stories set in the same universe as the comic. They are hosted on the same website as the comic. There are currently three stories, all of which are prequels to the comic: "Interior Emanations", a story about a teenage Duane's expulsion from seminary; "Orphans", a story about Quigley's encounter with the Black Tongues; and "Vienne of Seferpine", a story about Quigley's wife Vienne before her death. Another short story, "Evelyn Five-Eyes", was posted for the author's Patreon subscribers; it depicts Bastion's encounter with an efheby of the same name.

=== Ask Duane & Sette ===
Between November 2011 and January 2012 and again between July and September 2013, Cope would answer questions in-character as Duane or Sette on the website Formspring. After moving the webcomic to Tumblr, she again answered questions in-character on the Tumblr blog "Ask Duane & Sette" from September 2014 to February 2016. In August 2024 the blog was reopened with its subject changed to Bastion Winalils, and returned to Duane and Sette in December 2025. These answers are often comedic in nature, but sometimes contain additional information about the characters' backstory that can be considered "accurate" if not wholly canon.

=== Whumptober 2024 ===
Cope participated in the Whumptober writing challenge during October 2024, where she wrote 23 short stories about various Unsounded characters. The stories were posted to her Tumblr blog.

== Influences ==
In a 2011 interview with Sam Sykes, Cope lists numerous artists as inspiration for her work, praising the works of Alan Moore, Sophie Campbell, and Jeff Smith and listing Hayao Miyazaki, Range Murata, and Mahiro Maeda as "some of [her] favorite artists ever". In particular, she says the novels of Herman Melville "have always driven [her]." The title of the comic is a reference to a line from Moby-Dick: "By heaven, man, we are turned round and round in this world, like yonder windlass, and Fate is the handspike. And all the time, lo! that smiling sky, and this unsounded sea!" The full quote is explicitly referenced in the subtitles of Unsounded's final two chapters.

In addition to her literary influences, Cope also draws inspiration from her personal life. She has stated on her personal blog that the Frummagem, Winalils, and Adelier families are based on some of her own family members. However, she also believes it is important to understand one's limitations and research topics one has not personally experienced when the story calls for it. She lists the Nuremberg trials, the historical battles of World War I, and the lives of child soldiers in the Khmer Rouge as areas of research she explored in order to help her write about similar topics in the story, saying as one example, "How would I know what that was like for [child soldiers like] Lemuel otherwise, right?"

== Reception ==
The Star-Ledger, which selected Unsounded as one of the best new and most-dynamic webcomics of 2013, approved of the comic as having "grown to be the richest comic on the Internet, and, when Cope feels like demonstrating her chops, the most artfully drawn, too", which "[w]ith its bright colors, spell effects, action sequences, and descents into dreamscapes and dens of thieves, Unsounded often feels like a Fritz Leiber story illustrated by Hergé." The Daily Dot complimented how "Cope takes particular advantage of the web medium through her use of animation during impactful scenes", with E.K. Weaver noting to The Austin Chronicle its "incredibl[e] intrica[cy]" and The Beat complimenting how Cope "uses the comic’s digital nature to great advantage. Dramatic moments will sometimes pop out of the borders, magical forces will infiltrate the website design, or a joke will be animated for full effect. These tricks are used sparingly but to great effect. In many ways, this speaks to Unsounded as a whole. It can feel conventional, until it suddenly doesn’t," before concluding that "Unsounded isn’t a fantasy story about good and evil, but about different people with different goals. It has a huge supporting cast, and watching characters with competing world views bounce off each other is incredibly rewarding, especially as the plot thickens and the story increases in scale. All of these elements come together to make the comic a meaty meal that I recommend for people who really want to delve into their reading." ComicsAlliance likewise concluding "Cope [to be] fantastic at drawing action scenes, making them easier to follow visually than some superhero comics."

Some readers find Cope's heavy use of visual metaphor to be confusing, as it is not always clear which images are literal and which are not. A notable example was the scene of Vienne Quigley's death, where her torturers are metaphorically depicted as inhuman monsters. Due to the number of readers who believed the torturers' appearance to be literal, Cope chose to clarify the issue through a blog post.
