= Awkward Zombie =

Webcomic by Katie Tiedrich

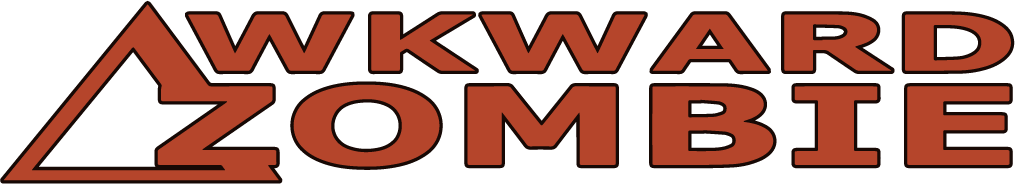
- Author: Katie Tiedrich
- Website: www.awkwardzombie.com
- Current status/schedule: Ongoing / Weekly (updates on Monday)
- Launch date: 20 September 2006
- Genre: Comedy

Awkward Zombie is an ongoing video game webcomic by Katie Tiedrich. Starting in 2006, the webcomic parodies the unusual aspects of video games in a comedic fashion. Initially gaining steam by parodying Super Smash Bros., Awkward Zombie is known for covering a broad selection of games. The webcomic has been featured by various gaming-related websites.

== Overview ==
Updating approximately once a week, Awkward Zombie consists of gag-a-day parodies of a broad selection of video games, such as Super Smash Bros., Fire Emblem, Pokémon, The Legend of Zelda, World of Warcraft, Red Dead Redemption, and the Metal Gear series. Focusing on the "ridiculous situations" that could occur in video game worlds, Awkward Zombie is entirely non-sequential, with no main characters or plotlines. Because of this, the comic can be read entirely out of order. Tiedrich occasionally makes cameos in her own webcomic.

Tiedrich occasionally does penciled 24-hour comics on the Awkward Zombie website. Tiedrich studied mechanical engineering at the Stevens Institute of Technology.

== Reception ==
Graham Smith, editor-in-chief of Rock, Paper, Shotgun, praised Awkward Zombie for its focus on comedy rather than story. Stating that video game webcomics usually "start off being about videogames and then they drift ... to being more about the characters contained within the comic," he said that Awkward Zombie's great strength is not having a regular cast of characters. The staff of Paste Magazine described Awkward Zombie as "consistently hilarious".

PC Magazine editor Eric Griffith listed Awkward Zombie among the "best webcomics of 2015". Awkward Zombie has frequently been featured in Kotaku's "Sunday Comics" column, and multiple pages of the webcomic have been voted in Joystiq's "Weekly Webcomic Wrapup" poll as the best comic of their respective weeks.
