= Sprite comic =

Type of webcomic

A panel of a hypothetical sprite comic featuring graphics from The Battle for Wesnoth

Sprite comics are webcomics that consist primarily of computer sprites from video games. Art assets are ripped from various classic games such as Mega Man and Sonic the Hedgehog, edited and combined with words by amateur cartoonists, and posted on the internet. Popularized by Bob and George in the early 2000s, the style is considered relatively easy for beginning cartoonists to get involved in, but sprite comics are generally looked down upon and considered low quality. The format has not seen mainstream attention since 8-bit Theater concluded in 2010.

== History ==
The 1998 webcomic Neglected Mario Characters was the first sprite comic to appear on the internet, though Bob and George was the first sprite comic to gain widespread popularity. Starting its run in 2000, Bob and George utilizes sprites from the Mega Man series of games, with most of the characters being taken directly from the games. Bob and George played a significant role in the popularity of sprite comics, as well as webcomics in general.

Internet users ripped art assets from Super NES, Sega Genesis, and Game Boy Advance games and collected them in online databases such as The Spriters Resource. A platform game such as Sonic Advance may contain hundreds of sprites of its protagonist running, jumping, and falling, providing a range of options for cartoonists, though they frequently recolored characters or edited them to convey a broader range of emotion. Over time, sprite comic creators collaborated with projects such as the World Spriters Tournament, in which cartoonists let their sprite comic characters fight one another.

Few sprite comics have gained mainstream attention since 8-Bit Theater ended in 2010. Though sprite comics are still popular among amateur cartoonists, Larry Cruz from Comic Book Resources noted that the aesthetic is played out.

== Style ==
Sprite comics mainly use graphics from 1980s video games, such as Mega Man and Final Fantasy. Lore Sjöberg from Wired stated that sprite comics "re-create the feel of [such games] with a minimum of artistic effort." Penny Arcade's Mike Krahulik pointed out that sprite comics are a good way for people who can't draw well to create comics. Cruz pointed out that the aesthetic has "evolved and flourished in a variety of media" since. However, the style is also commonly criticized. Cruz described sprite comics as "the favorite style for the laziest webcomic creators," while Sjöberg pointed out that sprite comics are often seen as substandard by comic fans. Both Chris Dlugosz and Michael Zole (Death to the Extremist) have criticized the style, Zole stating that creators of sprite comics "seem to think that they're scoring humor points just by reusing old pixelated characters," and Dlugosz devoting his webcomic Pixel explicitly to making fun of the practice.

In a review of the webcomic Kid Radd, Dani Atkinson of Sequential Tart noted that people without a gamer background may find that "much of the irony and humour in [sprite comics] goes swooshing over [their] head." However, she also praised Kid Radd specifically for using original sprites, unique to the webcomic, allowing for a broader audience. She described this as a "fake" sprite comic.

== Legal situation ==
Sprite comics are threatened by legal action, as the graphical sprites used in them are generally protected by copyright. Many sprite comics present themselves as parodies of the works they are based on, and as such they may be protected under fair use. However, seeing as many sprite comics have developed substantial plot-driven stories featuring the copyrighted characters and environments, it is quite possible that a sprite comic creator would lose a lawsuit if a game developer decided to sue. Thus far, no sprite comic has been subject to legal action. Capcom has stated that they will never "officially endorse" sprite comics, but no take-down request has ever taken place.

== See also ==
- List of video game webcomics
- Category:Sprite webcomics
