= Paranatural =

Webcomic

- Author(s): Zack Morrison
- Website: paranatural.net
- Current status/schedule: Updates Fridays
- Launch date: June 30, 2010
- Publisher(s): Hiveworks Comics LLC
- Genre(s): Action, comedy

Paranatural is a supernatural action/comedy webcomic created by Zack Morrison. The comic has been written and illustrated by Morrison since its debut in 2010, with eight completed chapters and a ninth chapter currently ongoing. Set in the fictional town of Mayview, the comic follows the Activity Club, a group of middle school students who have the ability to interact with the supernatural world.

The comic began on ComicFury and Smackjeeves before later moving to its own site.

== Synopsis ==
The comic follows the adventures of Max and the Activity Club throughout their adventures. They fight ghosts and bullies, play hitball, and solve the mysteries of the town.

Max, the protagonist of Paranatural

The story is told through an omniscient third person, sometimes including guest art or mini-comics. The comic was drawn page by page in a standard panel format, including shifted panels and extraneous movements depending on the activity going on, but was changed to traditional novel-esque story telling with illustrations due to the author's poor health. Morrison also includes alt text on each page (starting with the 24th page of the 1st chapter), with a short comment on the page.

Morrison interacts with their readers through the text underneath the pages as well as both their Twitter and Tumblr accounts.

== Reception ==
Comic Book Resources has described Paranatural as "fun, action-packed and visually inventive", with "enjoyable character moments", and compared it to Dragon Ball Z. PopOptiq considered it to be "brimming with wit and humor", while io9 emphasized that there is "a rich story sitting behind all that humor," and recommended it as worthy of an Eisner Award. The Hawkeye praised its humor, which it described as "a mix of almost self-aware snark, fun-loving parody, and downright great standalone jokes", its art, which it described as "a mix somewhere between western cartoon and anime", and its cast of characters. Inverse praised its "sly use of manga-esque stylistic tropes", remarking that "its characters leap off the screen".

Paranatural reached the final round of the Mix March Madness 2014 Webcomics Tournament, a single-elimination tournament between 128 contestants.
