= Goats (webcomic) =

Webcomic by Jonathan Rosenberg

- Good Hitler vs Space Hitler (1 of 19)
- Author: Jonathan Rosenberg
- Website: www.goats.com
- Current status/schedule: On hiatus since April 30, 2010
- Launch date: April 1, 1997
- Genre(s): Comedy, drama, action

Goats is a webcomic written and illustrated by Jonathan Rosenberg. It started on April 1, 1997. On April 3, 2006, after nine years drawing the strip, Rosenberg became a full-time cartoonist making his living drawing Goats. In 2010, because of work on the comic Scenes from a Multiverse, Goats was put on hiatus. In 2012 Rosenberg raised more than $55,000 via Kickstarter to print Goats Book IV, relaunch the website, and finish the story with Goats Book V. On August 19, 2014, 71 comics and all e-books were republished.

== History and premise ==
Goats follows a loose plot surrounding the adventures of Rosenberg's cartoon alter ego, along with his friend/drinking buddy Phillip, and many characters including animals, celebrities, aliens and villains. Most of the strips are separated into story arcs, which have very different, though still coherent, plots. Except for the time that the world was destroyed, all of the strips fit into one continuous timeline.

The strip originally took place entirely in Manhattan, New York, and mostly within either Jon and Phillip's apartment or their favorite bar (the Peculier Pub, mirroring a genuine Manhattan pub). After several years, the strip has expanded significantly in plot expansion, character development and scene location.

Diversification began after what Rosenberg has referred to as "the soft reset" of the Goats multiverse when the Earth was destroyed.

Goats and Rosenberg are part of the Dumbrella collective. Goats was hosted by Phillip Karlsson's Dumbrella Hosting service.

== Reception ==
Whitney Reynolds, producer of PC Magazine, said that, though Goats started out as a "poorly drawn" strip, the comic has morphed into a "sci-fi epic spanning dimensions."

== Books ==
Early comics were collected in paperbacks. As of November 2013, the following are available:

- Rosenberg, Jonathan. Tasty Yet Morally Ambiguous – Goats Volume I & II. – April 1, 1997, through February 1, 1999
- Rosenberg, Jonathan. Evil Chickens Don't Kiss – Goats Volume III. – February 2, 1999, through January 4, 2000
- Rosenberg, Jonathan. Behold the Power of Ignorance – Goats Volume IV. – January 5, 2000, through January 1, 2001

All of the above are available in e-book format, in addition to:

- Rosenberg, Jonathan. You Can Never Have Too Much Spite – Goats Volume V.
- Rosenberg, Jonathan. The International League of Pedants – Goats Volume VI.

Random House published three volumes through their Del Rey imprint:

- Rosenberg, Jonathan (June 23, 2009). Goats: Infinite Typewriters. Del Rey. ISBN 978-0345510921.
- Rosenberg, Jonathan (December 1, 2009). Goats: The Corndog Imperative. Del Rey. ISBN 978-0345510938.
- Rosenberg, Jonathan (May 25, 2010). Goats: Showcase Showdown. Del Rey. ISBN 978-0345510945.

One book was funded after a successful Kickstarter campaign, but is unavailable:

- Rosenberg, Jonathan (June 2013). Goats: Inhuman Resources.
