= Whomp! =

Webcomic by Ronnie Filyaw

- Whomp! Logo
- Author: Ronnie Filyaw
- Website: whompcomic.com
- Current status/schedule: Active
- Launch date: June 14, 2010
- Syndicate(s): Hiveworks
- Publisher: Hiveworks
- Genre(s): Humor, Satire

Whomp! is a webcomic authored and drawn by Ronnie Filyaw. The comic centers around the life and antics of the overweight, junk-food-obsessed and socially inept nerd Ronnie, who is a fictionalized version of the author, and his roommate, Agrias (Li Ming Chiu).

The webcomic was released every Monday, Wednesday and Friday: its art-style, characters and storylines have evolved significantly since the strip's debut in 2010, starting from black and white strips to the full color comic it is today.

The comic went on hiatus from June 2021 to February 2025, with updates resuming on February 8, 2025 with confirmation on February 17, 2025.

== Reception ==
Comic Book Resources has praised Whomp! as being "consistently funny", and described Ronnie as a "modern day Ziggy".

The Escapist considers it to be at the "sweet spot" between absurdity for the sake of humor, and autobiography, while Alex Langley lauds Filyaw's choice to not idealize or glorify himself.

== Characters ==
=== Ronnie ===
Ronnie

An avatar of the author, he has been described by Filyaw as "too similar, but not dissimilar enough" to himself, Ronnie is an overweight, social-recluse cartoonist who suffers from frequent anxiety attacks and very low self-esteem. He is obsessed with anime and McNuggets, and is shown to have poor grooming habits. Many of the strips' jokes use Ronnie's social anxiety and obesity as a source of humor. Ronnie is completely rotund and sports a scrubby beard, of which he appears to be enormously proud, allowing others to touch and feel it.

Ronnie's work as a cartoonist suffers from motivation problems, to the point that his motivation has anthropomorphized into "Motivation Dude". Ronnie's cartoon work is never explored in any detail, other than to show a few strips of his work, of the characters Sun and the Moon living together as roommates with their pet dog, Earth.

Ronnie is depicted as depressed, with some strips showing comical suicide attempts, and excerpts from his journal which claim that everyone hates him. These ideas of inadequacy are also encouraged by M-Dude, who takes perverse pleasure in tormenting Ronnie – both physically and psychologically.

=== Agrias ===
Agrias

Agrias (real name Li Ming Chiu) is Ronnie's (once former) housemate. Sensible and down-to-earth – but concerned with her image – Agrias often acts as a foil to Ronnie's unpredictable nature. She is shown to have a passing interest in video games and mainstream anime, and does not share Ronnie's poor grooming or dietary habits.

Agrias appears, on some level, to find Ronnie's character repulsive, and as such, the comics do not explore any romantic possibility between the pair (to the point of Agrias assuming that Ronnie is gay), although she ultimately displays a genuine concern for Ronnie's health and well-being.

=== Motivation Dude ===
An anthropomorphic representation of Ronnie's motivation (or lack thereof), "M-dude" takes sadistic pleasure in savagely beating, humiliating and demeaning Ronnie for his laziness and his physical appearance. He is described by the author as "a simple portrayal of my own self-loathing". M-Dude also displays occasional homo-erotic behaviour toward Ronnie (more specifically, Ronnie's belly).

=== Bee ===
"The cartoon representation of Ronnie's special Friend." Bee first appeared in the January 26, 2026 comic "Bodice Goddess".

== Books ==
Hand-drawn sketch in a Whomp! comic

Whomp! has published four books, which are sold online through the website. Books are often shipped with custom hand-drawn art, often to the customer's specification.

- Extra Large Slice of Life (B&W)
- Double Order of Cries (Full color)
- Quarter-Pouter with Cheese (Full color)
- Home of the Whomper (Full color)
