= Skin Deep (webcomic) =

Fantasy webcomic series by Missourian Kory Bing

- Jim, one of the main characters
- Author: Kory Bing
- Current status/schedule: Ongoing, updates Tuesdays
- Launch date: November 11, 2006
- Genre(s): Fantasy, Mythical

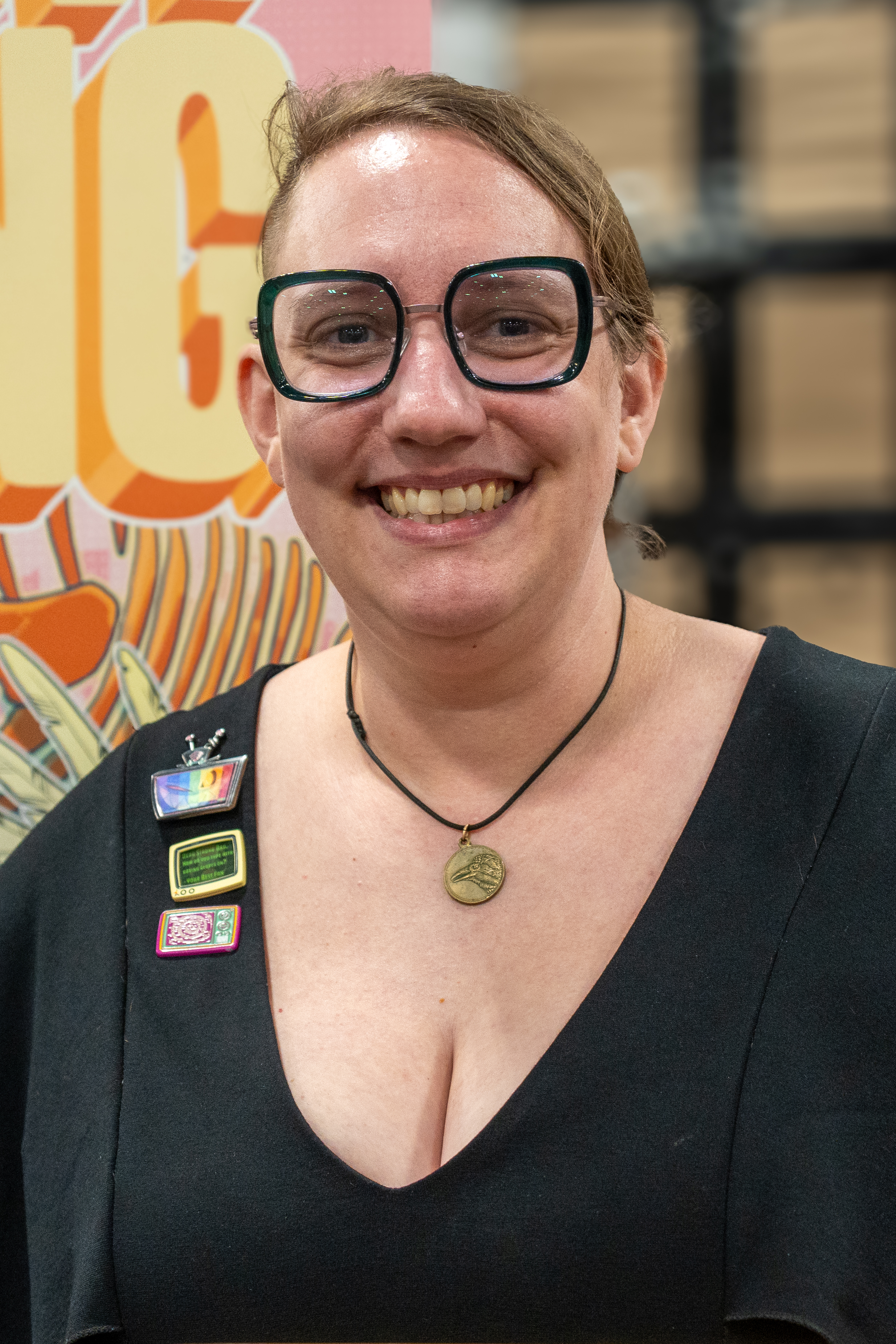
Bing at Comic Con Oakland 2026

Skin Deep is a fantasy webcomic series written and drawn by Missourian Kory Bing. The story follows the lives of various mythical creatures, such as a gryphon, a nixie, a satyr, and a sphinx, as they disguise themselves (using magical medallions) into the world of humans.

The story's narrative, which began its twelfth arc in January 2015, presents the point of view of Michelle, a college-aged Sphinx who has only recently learned that she is not human, and the various points of view of the citizens of Liverpool's Avalon, an entire magically hidden city.

The plot often works to establish a theme of different versions of normalcy, promoting acceptance and diversity.

== Premise ==
The story of Skin Deep chronicles around a world where most, if not all, mythical creatures, objects and terminology (e.g magic) exist, but are hidden away from the world of humans. Most Mythical Creatures have magical medallions, which can hide their true forms from human sight.

The comic is split into chapters, some of which are single multi-page short stories, others are multi-chaptered long stories. The story, as of February 2018, mostly takes place in the year 2004, though one story takes place in the year 2000 and two of latest stories take place in 2005.

== Arcs ==
- Orientations - Takes place in the US state of Missouri, in September 2004. Focuses on the turning (de-spelling of human disguise) of Michelle, a member of the supposedly extinct sphinx species. Explains many of the mechanisms of the Skin Deep world.
- Exchanges - Takes place in Liverpool, England, in August 2004. Focuses on the turning of Anthony Gillis, as well as the interactions between several of the inhabitants of the Liverpool Avalon.
- Illumination - Takes place during June 2005, at the Finns residence and focuses on the exploration of the secret of the sphinxes past and how Michelle Jocasta is involved. There are 9 short stories in the Skin Deep Archives, with them expanding upon Character bios and World-building.

== Characters ==
- Jimothy James, also known as Jim Finn (Orientations and Exchanges) - A maned gryphon. He is an exchange student from England who has the most knowledge about t/he mythical community, having been raised in one.
- Michelle Jocasta (Orientations)- A Grecian sphinx who is the focus of Orientations. She is accidentally turned from her human form into her real form, releasing a large burst of magic that causes the events following to happen.
- Merial McMinnus (Orientations)- A nixie who is Michelle's roommate and friend.
- Greg Tragos (Orientations)- A satyr, Merial's friend from before college.
- Eustace (Orientations) - A totem fox who runs the shop in the small Missouri Avalon.
- Marshall (Orientations) - A totem raven who is Eustace's best friend.
- The Bloodcarver (Orientations) - A mysterious member of the also supposedly extinct race of dragons.
- The Grimm Brothers (Orientations) - Three demons sent from Dis to retrieve the lost shade of Michelle's father. end up targeting Michelle, the newly turned sphinx.
- John Anthony Gillis (Exchanges) - A "human" who has a spell on him that hides his Harpy genes.
- Blanche Noir (Exchanges) - A white stag who introduces his best friend, Anthony, to his hidden life in the Avalon.
- Lorne Lyon (Exchanges) - A nemean lion, the best friend of Jim Finn.
- Jon Lyon (Exchanges) - A cranky nemean lion, the brother of Lorne and the best friend of Paul Finn.
- Vadoma Winifred Euryale, also known as Madame U (Exchanges) - A blind gorgon who runs the shop named Prestor John's that is full of magical items such as medallions who lives in the Liverpool Avalon.
- Alec Orville Hyde (Exchanges) - A bugbear who seems to be friends with Blanche.
- The Finns (Exchanges) - The clan of gryphons of which Jim is a member, consisting of James, Mary, Tobias, Paul, and Colin.
- Eleanor and Rupert (Exchanges) - A bandersnatch and jub-jub bird, respectively. Disgruntled Wonderlanders who have left their home to live in the Liverpool Avalon. Seen playing a mysterious card game in front of a restaurant.
- Zech Smith and Elise Madison Driver (Exchanges) - A centaur and pegasus, respectively. Seen arguing in the Avalon.
- The Stanley Dock Monster (Exchanges) - A giant water-like creature that lives outside of the Liverpool Avalon. She eats the garbage from the Avalon.
- Gabe (Orientations) - An angel who is friends with the Grimm Brothers. They are usually seen smoking or drinking.

== Development ==
Bing has run three Kickstarter campaigns to collect the comic in print, one for each volume.
