= 8-Bit Theater =

Comedic sprite comic

- Author: Brian Clevinger
- Website: www.nuklearpower.com
- Current status/schedule: Completed
- Launch date: March 2, 2001
- End date: June 1, 2010
- Genre(s): Sprite comic, fantasy, comedy, parody

8-Bit Theater is a sprite comic, meaning the art is mainly taken from pre-existing video game assets, created by Brian Clevinger. It was originally published from 2001 to 2010 and consists of 1,225 pages. The webcomic was, at times, one of the most popular webcomics, and the most popular sprite comic.

The comic initially follows and parodies the plot of the first Final Fantasy game, following the "Warriors of Light" who are supposedly on a quest to find four elemental orbs to help them defeat Chaos. Instead, the characters mainly serve their own selfish interests, causing destruction in their wake.

The success of 8-Bit Theater contributed to the popularity in creating sprite comics, with one list recording over 1,200 sprite comics as of 2004. 8-Bit Theater allowed Clevinger to earn an income, and gain experience and exposure, which led to future works, such as Atomic Robo.

== Creation ==
8-Bit Theater began in March 2001. It was one of the first sprite comics, a comic made by using pre-existing video game graphics. In one interview, Brian Clevinger said that he had had the idea of doing a sprite comic but had not acted on it until someone sent him a link to the sprite comic Bob and George which inspired him to try it himself. Clevinger also said that he lacked drawing skills, which made a sprite comic attractive. Clevinger used the comics as part of a college assignment, saying that "8-Bit Theater began as an excuse to essentially do nothing and get college credit for it". Clevinger originally intended to use 8-Bit Theater to adapt multiple NES games, such as Metroid and River City Ransom, but ultimately stuck with Final Fantasy because "everyone liked the FF one so much."

8-Bit Theater uses sprites from the first Final Fantasy game for the NES, as well as other games, though Clevinger often altered the sprites, added effects, and created original backgrounds, as well as using other pre-existing images from the internet. The comic sometimes used 16-bit or 32-bit sprites to depict more powerful creatures. While most speech bubbles are white with black text, colored bubbles or text are sometimes used to give an impression of the voice. The use of video game assets was unauthorized use of copyrighted material, but as of 2004 Clevinger had not heard directly from the copyright owners of the images. In 2004, Clevinger said that if he was to do it over again, he would not have done a sprite comic because of the limitations of pre-existing art and the copyright issues, but continued to produce 8-Bit Theater because "it's paying the bills... And also, as much as I complain about the limiting factors, it's a lot of fun and I enjoy finding new ways to approach the material".

The comic also included original artwork created by Lydia Tyree and Kevin Sigmund, who contributed hand drawn art and custom sprites respectively. The final page of the comic, an epilogue, was drawn by Matt Speroni.

In a 2009 interview, Clevinger said that he typically spent Monday, Wednesday, and Friday mornings writing the comic, then spent the afternoons and evening putting the comic together. He used Adobe Photoshop to create the comic.

8-Bit Theater ended in 2010. Once completed, the comic had 1,225 pages.

== Premise ==
8-Bit Theater started out as a loose retelling and parody of the plot of the first Final Fantasy game, and features exaggerated portrayals of characters from that game, including the main characters Fighter, Thief, Red Mage, and Black Mage.

The group are ostensibly on a quest to find four elemental orbs to help them defeat Chaos, but the characters have no interest in the quest and mostly focus on furthering their own selfish goals. According to one reviewer: "The first change it makes to the plot of Final Fantasy is to turn the original protagonists into the three worst people in the world, plus Fighter. They lie, steal, and murder their way through the story, claiming to be heroes in the same way spam claims to be food. In their (very limited) defense, sometimes they just hurt people on accident... [the group goes] on a nine-year-tour of their world, marking their progress with new enemies, confused onlookers, and a whole lot of corpses".

Clevinger described 8-Bit Theater in an interview as "a comic about the four people most ill-equipped to save the world who, through chicanery and brute ignorance, are the very people tasked with doing so. It's mostly a parody of fantasy and video game tropes, but a wide range of subjects are touched upon".

The comic points out and dissects many of the tropes used in role-playing video games, especially those from Japan. A significant portion of the humor results from creating reader anticipation for dramatic moments which fail to come; Clevinger said that "[his] favorite comics are the ones where the joke is on the reader". According to a reviewer, 8-Bit Theater "developed one of the most meta-textual, self-referential, self-deprecating encyclopedia of esoteric in-jokes".

== Characters ==
=== Light Warriors ===
The Light Warriors, riding blue Chocobos. From left to right: Red Mage, Thief, Black Mage and Fighter.

The four main characters are collectively known as the "Warriors of Light" or the "Light Warriors":

- Black Mage (full name Black Mage Evilwizardington): an ultra-violent, sadistic character who usually uses giant fireballs to respond to any situation. He attracts bad luck which causes innocent bystanders to be harmed. He often makes pathetic advances towards White Mage.
- Fighter (full name Fighter McWarrior): a constantly stupid character. He has a childlike innocence that "somehow doesn't keep him from being the group's personal weapon of mass destruction".
- Thief (also known as the Prince of Elfland): the most competent of the group. He is driven by greed and self-interest.
- Red Mage (full name Red Mage Statscowski): a min-maxer driven to gain the best stats possible. A reviewer described him as having "a love-hate relationship with physics and logic, in that both hate him because he loves to snap natural laws like chicken bones in the grip of his truly impressive stupid ideas". He believes the world is a tabletop role-playing game.

=== Other notable characters ===
- White Mage — a priestess specializing in white (healing) magic. White Mage was assigned by her order to protect fate and to help the Light Warriors save the world. She discreetly follows the Light Warriors around the world for a lengthy portion of the comic to achieve this goal.
- Black Belt — a talented martial artist and travelling companion of White Mage. Black Belt had an extremely poor sense of direction, to the effect that the laws of physics and spacetime tended to rearrange themselves around him. He was killed by the Fiend Kary in the course of the series.
- Sarda the Sage — an omnipotent wizard who forces the Light Warriors to retrieve the four elemental orbs. He claims to be "The Wizard Who Did It" and uses his powers in an immensely irresponsible and careless manner.
- The Dark Warriors — the evil counterparts to the Light Warriors. A group of villains based on minor enemies from the game. They consist of Garland, Bikke the Pirate, Drizz'l the Dark Elf Prince, and Vilbert Von Vampire. They plot the downfall of the Light Warriors, but are depicted as even more inept than the Light Warriors themselves.
- The Four Fiends — powerful elemental beings that guard their respective elemental orbs. They are Lich, Kary, Ur, and Muffin. They were individually killed by the Light Warriors, and then, following their resurrection as a group, killed by Black Mage.

== Plot ==
8-Bit Theater opens with an introductory sequence that explains how the Light Warriors initially meet and decide to form an adventuring party in the kingdom of Corneria, where King Steve's daughter, Princess Sara, is being held captive by the knight Garland in the nearby Temple of Fiends. After her rescue, during which both the Light Warriors and Garland himself are shown as so incompetent that Sara has to orchestrate her kidnapping and rescue herself, the king has a bridge built that connects Corneria to the main continent.

Here the Light Warriors meet the witch Matoya, who blackmails them into recovering her stolen crystal. In the port town of Pravoka the party defeats the pirate Bikke (accompanied by Garland) and uses his ship to travel on to Elfland. There, they discover the King has been poisoned, apparently by the same person who stole Matoya's crystal, and Thief is the prince of Elfland. The Light Warriors retrieve the antidote and Matoya's crystal from the dark elf Drizz'l, who is shortly thereafter recruited by Garland and Bikke. Upon his recovery, the Elf King sends the Light Warriors to save Elfland by retrieving the Earth Orb from two undead beings, Vilbert von Vampire and his father Lich, the Fiend of Earth. Vilbert survives the battle and is later recruited into Garland's Dark Warriors, while Lich goes to hell. White Mage then sends the Light Warriors to meet Sarda the Sage, an omnipotent wizard who takes the Earth orb and proceeds to draft the group into quests for the other three elemental orbs.

The Fire Orb is held by Kary, the Fiend of Fire in Gurgu Volcano, who kills Black Belt before the group can defeat her and retrieve the orb. A subsequent side quest to the Ice Cave on Sarda's behalf, during which the Light Warriors encounter squid-like Doom Cultists, is ultimately fruitless. A second side quest, however, involves the Light Warriors meeting the dragon god-king Bahamut, who sends them to the Castle of Ordeals to obtain a rat tail. There, the Light Warriors each face their own internal demons: Sloth (Fighter), Pride (Red Mage), Greed (Thief) and a doppelgänger of Black Mage, who is the only thing that can represent his evil. The Light Warriors present the rat tail to Bahamut, only to find that it is an ingredient in a virility soup his girlfriend Matoya makes for him. The party is rewarded with class upgrades: Red Mage becomes a Mime, Fighter becomes a Knight, Thief becomes a Ninja, and Black Mage becomes a Blue Mage with some help from a Dark God.

Returning to the task of retrieving the elemental orbs, the Light Warriors travel to the cities of Gaia and Onrac and use a submarine provided by Sarda to reach the Sea Shrine, where they meet the Doom Cultists a second time. After defeating them, they accidentally summon the third Fiend, Ur (known in the game as Kraken). The Light Warriors kill Ur, retrieve the Water Orb and travel on to Lefein in search of the Air Orb, where they meet Dragoon, the last Dragon Knight, and the evil dragon Muffin, the fourth Fiend, who guards the Orb of Air. During a battle in Muffin's Sky Castle she is killed by Dragoon. The Sky Castle itself explodes after Fighter and Black Mage take the Air Orb.

Upon presenting the final orb to Sarda, he dismissively orders the Light Warriors to return to the Temple of Fiends, where they find that the Dark Warriors have made the temple their base of operations. During the night, Drizz'l summons the Four Fiends from Hell and has them confront the Light Warriors. Black Mage, using evil energy he absorbed from his doppelgänger, kills the fiends, absorbs their evil energies as well and turns on the other Light Warriors. Sarda interrupts the fight and reveals his intent to destroy the Light Warriors himself.

Sarda explains himself to be the grown-up version of a child that suffered great harm as a result of the Light Warrior's actions around the world. Young Sarda became so focused on revenge that he studied to be a great wizard and travelled back in time to the beginning of the universe to remake it without the Light Warriors; after discovering that changing the past was impossible even for him, he decides to settle for making the Light Warriors into the warriors of legend, for no other reason than to further humiliate them in defeat. Sarda absorbs the orbs' magic energy as well as Black Mage's evil energy and easily unmakes not only the Light Warriors' class changes, but also removes their original abilities. Sarda's power quickly becomes erratic and unstable, and Chaos, the King of Demons, takes the opportunity to possess Sarda's body and announce his plans to annihilate the universe.

However, before a final battle between the Light Warriors and Chaos can begin, he is destroyed off-panel by a group of four White Mages, a party combination that was dismissed in one of the earliest episodes as ineffectual for the game, and all credit for saving the world goes to a group of bystanders, the Dark Warriors. The Epilogue picks up three years later. White Mage visits Red Mage and Dragoon at a restaurant, where they have started up an extremely unsuccessful support group for sole survivors of ancient sects. Afterward, White Mage visits King Thief in Elfland, who has been trying to locate Black Mage and Fighter, in an effort to obtain more riches from their adventure. Black Mage and Fighter find themselves poor and out of work in a remote town, trying to make money by taking job postings in the town square. The epilogue ends with Fighter suggesting that they resume their search for the "Armor of Invincibility" that Fighter has been searching for since the beginning of the comic.

== Reception ==
=== Readership figures ===
Around 2003/04, 8-Bit Theater was the most popular sprite comic on the web and was one of the most popular and successful webcomics of all. In 2009, Multiverse Comics described it as "massively successful" and "one of the bigger smash hits of the web-comic world".

Clevinger said in 2003 that standing out among webcomics was a big issue to success at that time, noting that he pulled in a lot of readers by being one of the first sprite comics, but said "a gimmick like that can only take you so far. And usually it takes you to a lot of first time visitors with no repeat traffic".

=== Reviews during its run ===
Writing for 1Up.com in 2005, Nich Maragos said that "it was unquestionably Brian Clevinger's 8-Bit Theater that took [sprite comics] to its fullest expression and greatest popularity". Maragos said that "unlike a lot of the lesser sprite comic creators, Clevinger spices up what could very quickly become a repetitive gimmick with lots of effects, original backgrounds, and uniquely altered sprites to make sure the series never gets visually stale. In addition to keeping the look of the strip fresh, the effort put into the layouts and effects also helps the artist fend off accusations that he's merely ripping off existing work and passing it off as his own". Maragos did say that "the humor is often far more repetitive than the art. To compensate for this, Clevinger begun focusing more on story than jokes some time ago, but as a rule the quality of the writing hasn't become any sharper. A large component of the strip's popularity is love for the characters Clevinger uses".

Reviewers writing for Sequential Tart recommended 8-Bit Theater on multiple occasions. Donielle Ficca wrote in 2007 that "when I was introduced to 8-Bit Theater, I was transported back to my mom's basement playing role-play video games for hours at a time... Nearly every geek I know who loves older games absolutely loves 8-Bit Theater. It has grown and welcomed into its fold newer people that simply have a particular sense of humor. If you are at all interested in parody or video games this is one comic you should definitely check out".

=== Reviews of the completed comic ===
Writing for Comic Book Resources, Larry Cruz said, "[in sprite comics] every character is generally rendered in the same scale and the same sideways or three-quarters position from panel to panel, [so] sprite comics became the favorite style for the laziest webcomic creators. Clevinger could get away with it because he has a knack for writing dialogue that's clever at times, silly at times, but always full of personality".

Mikkel Snyder, a staff writer for Black Nerd Problems, said that 8-Bit Theater was the first webcomic he read and was "the comic that made me love comics". He described it as a "sprawling saga" which "thrived on Clevinger's love of video games and ability to use serialized webcomic formatting to tell this comedic tale".

Matthew Pardue reviewed 8-Bit Theater for the University of North Georgia's University Press blog. Pardue strongly recommended the comic, though noted the humor was highly dark, that the comic featured "(pixilated [sic]) violence, adult concepts, and some adult language", and said, "I personally think it takes some time for Clevinger to really hit his stride. His humor peeks through a little early on, but it only busts out in force after a few hundred strips".

Writing for Io9, Lauren Davis recommended 8-Bit Theater in a list of recommended completed webcomics for those that "enjoy video game-inspired comics (and/or Atomic Robo)".

=== Awards ===
8-Bit Theater won the Web Cartoonists' Choice Award for Best Fantasy Comic in 2002, and was nominated for two other awards. It was also nominated for a WCCA award in 2003.

=== Financial success ===
In 2002, Clevinger was supporting himself financially from the comic through T-shirt sales, advertisements, and a "donation" service by which readers could voluntarily send him money. Clevinger offered rewards for donating such as wallpapers.

== Legacy ==
The success of 8-Bit Theater and another sprite comic Bob and George, along with their ease of creation, led to hundreds of other sprite comics. One list of sprite comics identified over 1,200 sprite comics as of 2004. Shaenon K. Garrity said in a history of webcomics: "With the success of sprite comics like Brian Clevinger's 8-Bit Theater (2001) and clipart comics like Ryan North's Daily Dinosaur Comics (2003) and David Malki's Wondermark (2003), people discovered that they didn't need to be able to draw to be webcartoonists. The barn door flew open". However, no other sprite comic reached the popularity of 8-Bit Theater.

8-Bit Theater was Brian Clevinger's first experience writing a comic. His experience, as well as exposure through the comic, allowed him to write more comics, including Atomic Robo as well as writing for both Marvel Comics and DC Comics.

The comic was part of the Create a Comic Project, in which versions of the comic with dialog removed were provided to allow students to write their own, encouraging writing and creativity skills. An expansion pack for the board game Bargain Quest was released in 2019, based on characters and items from 8-Bit Theater.

In 2021, Clevinger launched a Kickstarter for the 8-Bit Theater 20th Anniversary Complete Script Book which collected every strip. The book was script-only due to copyright issues and the low 72 dpi resolution of the sprite comics, which is well below the threshold for quality printing. It reached its initial goal on April 21. It was released exclusively on the CRWN Studios website.

== See also ==
- Brian Clevinger
- Atomic Robo, another comic written by Brian Clevinger
