= Brian Clevinger =

American comics writer

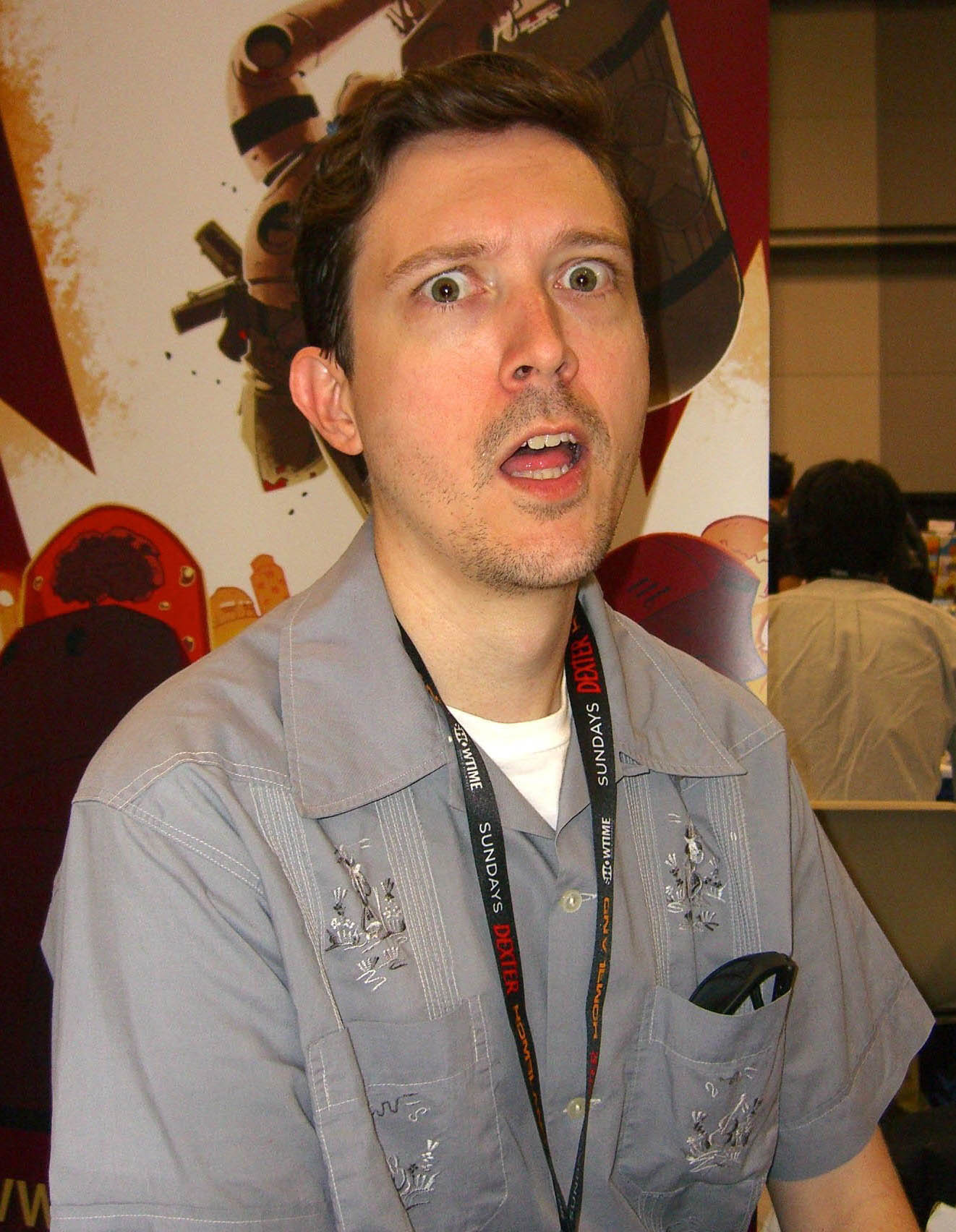
- Clevinger at the 2011 New York Comic Con
- Born: June 7, 1978 (age 48)
- Area: Writer

Brian Clevinger (born May 7, 1978) is an American writer best known as the author of the webcomic 8-Bit Theater and the Eisner-nominated print comic Atomic Robo. He is also the author of the self-published novel Nuklear Age.

== Career ==
=== Webcomics ===
Clevinger's webcomic, 8-Bit Theater, which is hosted on his site Nuklear Power, is very loosely based on the video game Final Fantasy I and tells the story of four would-be fantasy heroes, known as the Light Warriors, who set out to save the world from the embodiment of Chaos, but are conflicted over their own stupidity and malice. The comic was created using 8-bit graphic sprites taken primarily from the Final Fantasy NES games, or created by either Clevinger himself or Kevin Sigmund. Spanning 1225 episodes, it ran from March 2, 2001, to June 1, 2010.

In addition to 8-Bit Theater, Clevinger is the creator of two mini-comics: Dynasty Memory, created in 2002 as a parody of the Dynasty Warriors series, and Field of Battle, created in August 2005 as a general parody of first-person shooter games, drawing most of its influence from Battlefield 2.

In 2009, Clevinger started two other webcomics on Nuklear Power. Warbot in Accounting, co-written with artist Zack Finfrock, is about a war machine's struggles with human daily life in a white collar job. How I Killed Your Master, "a kung fu movie, but a comic", is co-written with John Wood and drawn by Matt Speroni.

=== Print ===
Atomic Robo, drawn by Scott Wegener, began as a six-issue limited series published by Red 5 Comics starting in October 2007. It was nominated in the "Best Limited Series" category of the 2008 Eisner Awards, won by The Umbrella Academy. Colorist Ronda Pattison was also nominated in the "Best Coloring" category subsequently won by Dave Stewart.

Clevinger revamped the saga of The Infinity Gauntlet for Marvel Comics' all-ages series Marvel Adventures. Clevinger contributed in writing of two issues of World War Hulks: Wolverine vs. Captain America, which were released in the summer of 2010.

The self-published novel Nuklear Age is largely an extended parody of comic books. The book recounts the adventures of Nuklear Man and his sidekick, Atomik Lad, as they fight against rogue military weapons, highly evolved civilizations, the trials of everyday life, an angst-filled over-villain of undeniable power, the ever exotic Dr. Menace, and their own impulses. A sequel called Atomik Age was planned but never completed.

=== Style ===
Clevinger has stated that "[his] favorite comics are the ones where the jokes are on the reader."

== Personal life ==
Michael J. Novosel, Clevinger's grandfather, was a United States Army helicopter pilot and recipient of the Medal of Honor.
