= Portrayal of women in American comics =

The portrayal of women in American comic books has often been a subject of controversy since the medium's beginning. Critics have noted that both lead and supporting female characters are substantially more subjected to gender stereotypes (with femininity or sexual characteristics having a larger presence in their overall character / characteristics) than the characters of men.

== History ==
=== Golden Age of Comic Books ===
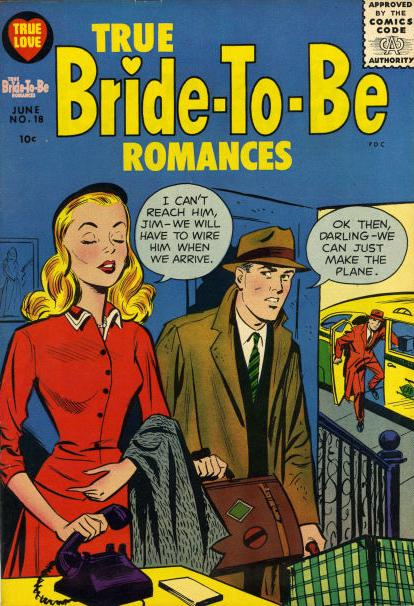
Cover of True Bride-to-Be Romances#18

In the Golden Age of Comic Books (a time when the medium evolved from comic strips), women who were not superheroes were primarily portrayed in secondary roles. Some examples include: being classified as career girls, romance-story heroines, or lively teenagers. Career-oriented girls included such characters as Nellie the Nurse, Tessie the Typist, and Millie the Model, who all appeared in comic books working jobs that non-wartime women of the era typically worked. Romance heroines were popular in the romance genre, pioneered by Joe Simon and Jack Kirby. Typically, the heroine was either a "good girl" or "bad girl", with both attributes not really affecting male characters' decisions. In the Archie Comics, the titular character can never definitively choose between his two love interests Betty and Veronica. These characters typify the dichotomy between the good Girl-Next-Door-type versus the dangerous allure of her foil, the "Bad Girl". The duo got a comic of their own in 1950. Betty and Veronica quickly became popular, featuring the two lead characters, who continually obsessed about boys, and fought over who would get to date Archie.

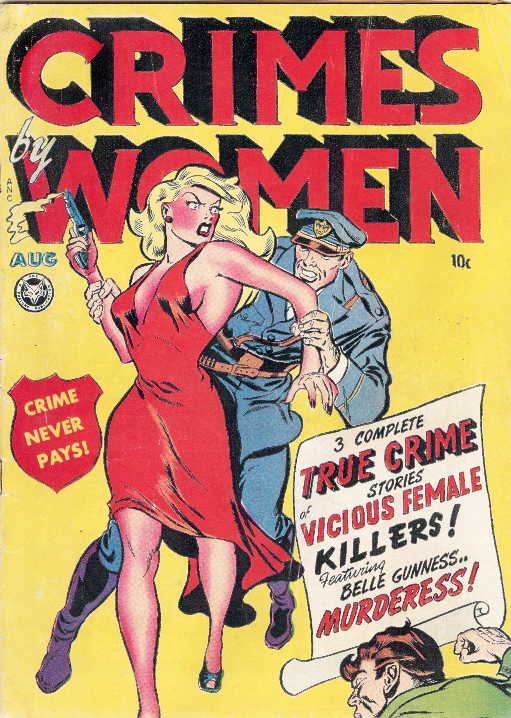
Cover of Crimes by Women#1

Costumed female crimefighters were among the early comic characters. One of the earliest female superheroes appearing in newspaper strips was the Invisible Scarlet O'Neil by Russell Stamm. The tough, fighting Miss Fury, debuted in the eponymous comic strip by female cartoonist Tarpé Mills in 1941. A particular publisher, Fiction House, featured several progressive heroines such as the jungle queen Sheena, whose sex appeal helped launch the comic series. As Trina Robbins, in The Great Women Superheroes wrote:

[M]ost of [Fiction House's] pulp-style action stories either starred or featured strong, beautiful, competent heroines. They were war nurses, aviatrixes, girl detectives, counterspies, and animal skin-clad jungle queens, and they were in command. Guns blazing, daggers unsheathed, sword in hand, they leaped across the pages, ready to take on any villain. And they did not need rescuing.

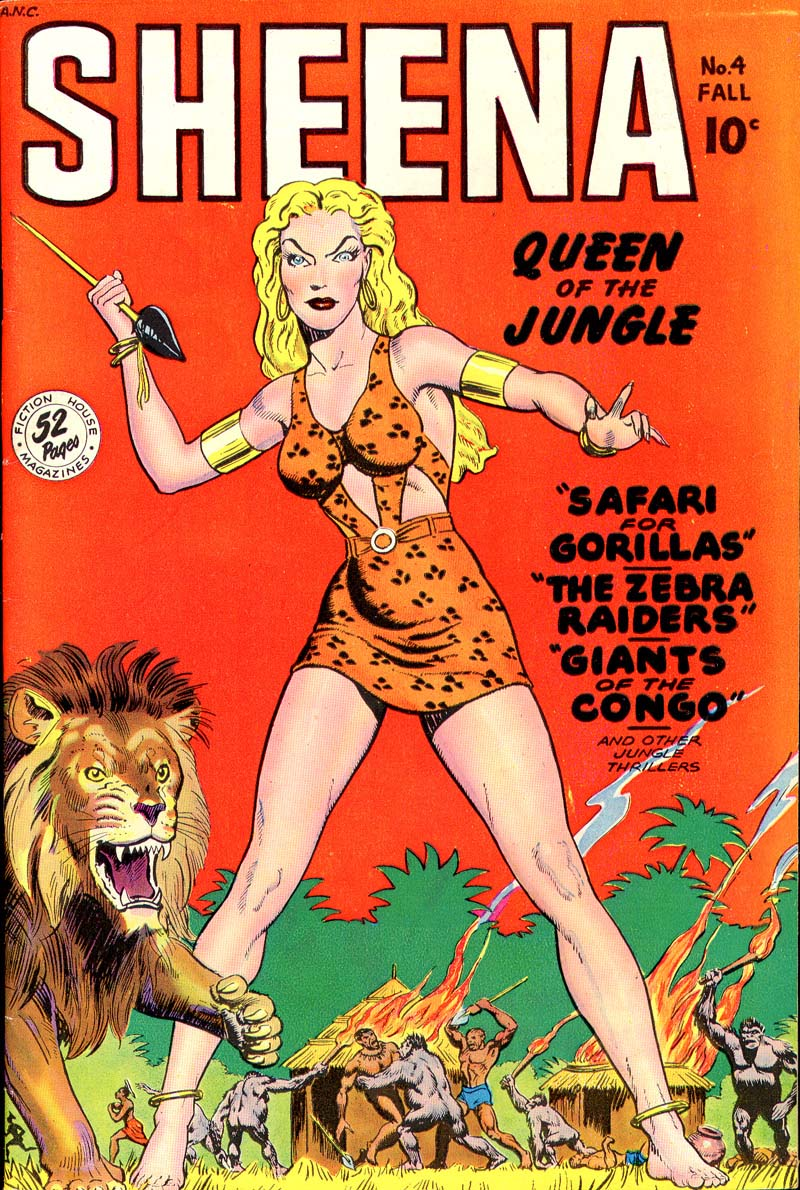
Cover of Sheena#4

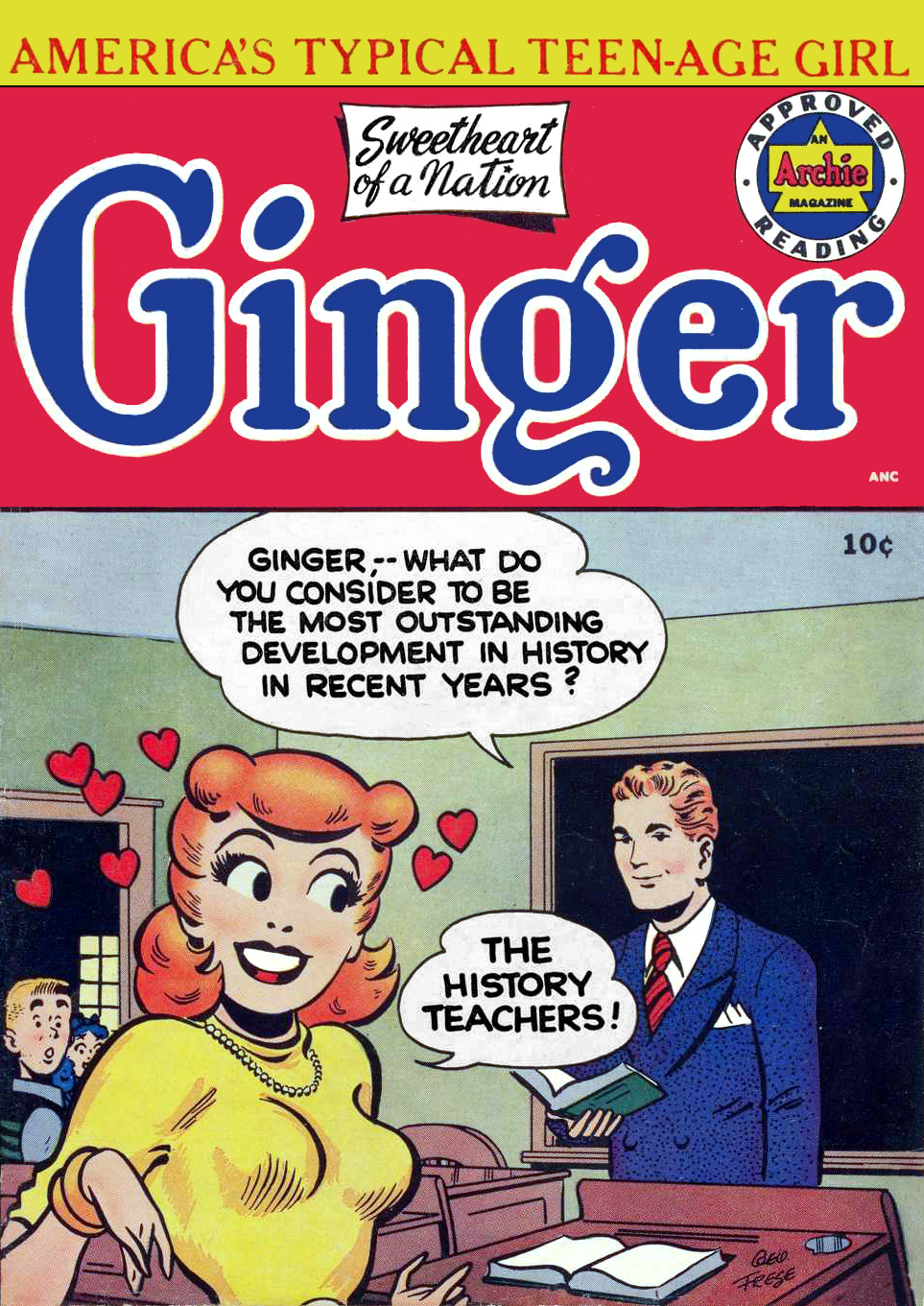
"America's Typical Teenage Girl": Ginger number 1, 1952. Artwork by George Frese.

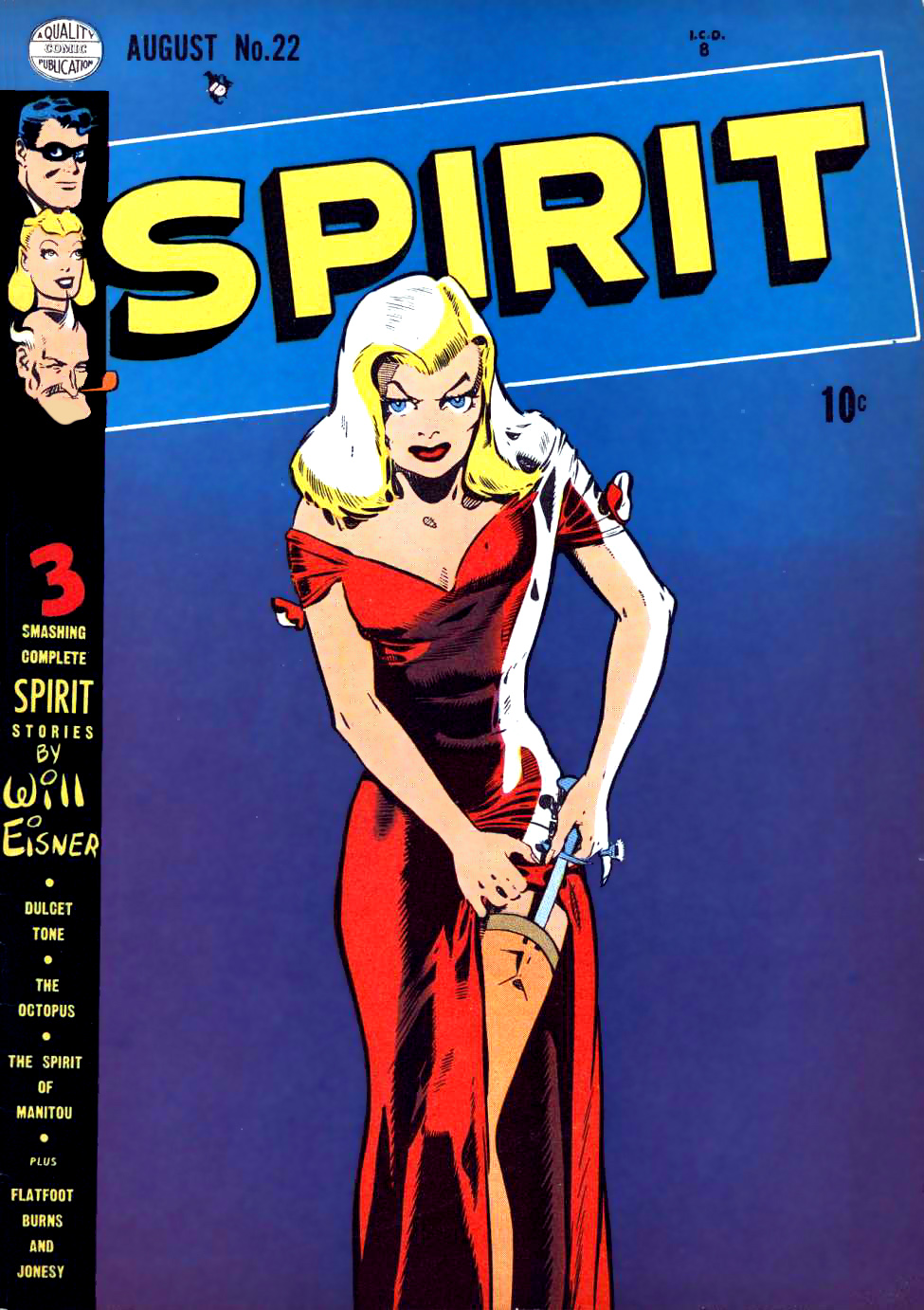
The Spirit, volume 1, number 22, August 1950. Artwork by Will Eisner.

One of the earliest female superheroes is writer-artist, Fletcher Hanks's minor character Fantomah. She is an ageless, ancient Egyptian woman living in modern times, who could transform herself into a skull-faced creature with superpowers to fight evil. She debuted in Fiction House's Jungle Comics #2 (Feb. 1940), credited to the pseudonymous "Barclay Flagg". The first widely recognizable female superhero is Wonder Woman, from All-American Publications, one of three companies that would merge to form DC Comics.

In an October 25, 1940, interview conducted by former student Olive Byrne (pseudonym 'Olive Richard'), and published as "Don't Laugh at Comics" in Family Circle, William Moulton Marston described what he saw as the great educational potential of comic books. A follow-up article was published two years later in 1942. This article caught the attention of comics publisher Max Gaines, who hired Marston as an educational consultant for National Periodicals and All-American Publications. Two of these companies that would merge to form DC Comics.

At that time, Marston decided to develop a new superhero. In the early 1940s the DC line was dominated by super-powered male characters such as the Green Lantern, Batman, and his flagship character, Superman. According to the Fall 2001 issue of the Boston University alumni magazine, it was his wife Elizabeth Holloway's idea to create a female superhero. Marston introduced the idea to Max Gaines, (co-founder along with Jack Liebowitz) of All-American Publications. Given the go-ahead, Marston developed Wonder Woman with Elizabeth (whom Marston believed to be a model of that era's unconventional, liberated woman). In creating Wonder Woman, Marston was also inspired by Olive Byrne, who lived with the couple in a polygamous/polyamorous relationship. In a 1943 issue of The American Scholar, Marston wrote:

"Not even girls want to be girls so long as our feminine archetype lacks force, strength, and power. Not wanting to be girls, they don't want to be tender, submissive, peace-loving as good women are. Women's strong qualities have become despised because of their weakness. The obvious remedy is to create a feminine character with all the strength of Superman plus all the allure of a good and beautiful woman."

Wonder Woman is an Amazon Princess; the Amazons were daughters of Ares, the god of war in Greek Mythology. and were created to be stronger and wiser than men.

Some of Marston's early stories portrayed Wonder Woman in some non-traditional roles such as President of the United States^{[a]} and a modern-day Incan Sun God^{[b]}.

Despite these portrayals of women in leadership roles, editor Sheldon Mayer was disturbed by the recurring bondage imagery. If Wonder Woman's bracelets were chained together, she became as weak as any other woman. According to Marston this bondage imagery was a reflection of the suffragette movement's use of bondage. Suffragettes would tie themselves to well-known buildings, in protest. He insisted it was important that she could be seen freeing herself, both literally and symbolically, from man-made bondage, but he also upheld some ideals of submission to "peace, restraint and good judgement".

One issue dealt with Wonder Woman losing control because her bracelets had broken; she was driven mad because the bracelets represented restraint, and stated "power without self-control tears a girl to pieces".^{[c]} Other writers portrayed Wonder Woman in more conventional female roles of the time. After a survey was conducted among Justice Society Readers, Wonder Woman was admitted to All-Star Comics # 11.

Although it was published concurrently with Marston's run in Sensation Comics, the writer of Justice Society kept Wonder Woman in the limited position as Secretary of the League, rarely involving her in action. In 1947 Marston died, and although his widow petitioned to be hired as a writer, DC instead hired Robert Kanigher. Under his direction Wonder Woman's physical prowess declined. She was no longer depicted in chains, she became more and more submissive, and her priorities shifted to be more conventional to gender roles of the time. Between crime fighting, Diana Prince engaged in more so-called feminine jobs as a babysitter, fashion model, or movie star and in her classic job as Steve Trevor's secretary, with a new dedication to marrying him. A new form of bondage that Wonder Woman craved was the mantle of wife and mother. In one Sensational Comics issue, Wonder Woman tells a woman that she envied her life as a mother and wife.

During World War II, women assumed jobs formerly occupied by men, becoming truck drivers, stevedores, and welders. The same was reflected in comic books, as heroes such as Hawkman turned to their wives or girlfriends for help, creating a new category of heroines: the partners. Many women, after World War II, refused to give up their newfound freedom, creating a massive crisis in formerly assumed definitions of masculinity and femininity. The femme fatale (prevalent in The Spirit comic book) exemplified this crisis: a strong, sexually aggressive woman who refused to stay in her traditional "proper" place.

This post-war tension affected the comic book industry directly when a Senate Subcommittee was created to address a perceived rise of juvenile delinquency. Influenced largely by Fredric Wertham's book published that same year, Seduction of the Innocent, a public hearing was held to determine if juvenile delinquency and comic books were linked. Wertham had specifically attacked the portrayal of many comic book women, stating: "They are not homemakers. They do not bring up a family. Mother-love is entirely absent... Even when Wonder Woman adopts a girl there are Lesbian overtones".

Comic books were deemed to be a threat to the standards of American decency, and instead of undergoing government regulation, the Comics Magazine Association of America agreed to create and adhere to its own code of self-censorship. The code explicitly censors violence, sexuality and "abnormal" romance for the implicit purpose of "emphasiz[ing] the value of the home and the sanctity of marriage" and a re-enforcement of traditional gender roles.

=== Silver Age of Comic Books ===
Between 1961 and 1963, romance comics were one of the top two comic book genres. This genre influenced many superhero comics of the era. Although superhero titles would eventually become the leading genre, DC Comics' Young Romance would end its thirty-year run in 1977.

After the implementation of the Comics Code, DC Comics implemented its own in-house Editorial Policy Code regarding the portrayal of women, which stated: "The inclusion of females in stories is specifically discouraged. Women, when used in plot structure, should be secondary in importance, and should be drawn realistically, without exaggeration of feminine physical qualities". Most of DC's Silver Age superheroes each had a major female supporting character. These included three career women: journalist Lois Lane, who worked at the Daily Planet with Superman's alter ego, Clark Kent; Jean Loring, lawyer and girlfriend of Ray Palmer a.k.a. the Atom; and aircraft manufacturer executive Carol Ferris, the boss of Green Lantern's alter ego, Hal Jordan. Iris West was the on-again, off-again girlfriend of the Flash's alter ego, Barry Allen.

Batman's supporting cast, beginning in the 1950s, occasionally included journalist Vicki Vale and heiress Kathy Kane, whose alter ego was the motorcycle-riding masked crimefighter Batwoman. With a tip of her cowl to the Harvey Comics character the Black Cat, who preceded her by 15 years as a superheroine on a motorcycle, Batwoman used weapons as well, although hers included powder puffs, charm bracelets, perfume, a hair net, a compact mirror, and a shoulder bag utility case with matching bolo strap. Batwoman was created to be a romantic interest for Batman to invalidate the growing idea of a homosexual relationship between Batman and Robin.

During this time frame, the comics of the Silver Age of Comic Books published by Marvel and DC were different enough that if someone liked one, they were liable not to like the other. If they wanted the classic feel of the original 1940s superheroes, they would prefer DC offerings. If they wanted fast action mixed with the emotional angst reflecting a world where social unrest was slowly coming to a boil, they were more likely to read the Marvel offerings. When Atlas Comics became Marvel Comics in 1961, many brand new women superheroes were introduced; these superheroes were given supporting roles. The first female superhero from the newly named Marvel Comics was the Invisible Girl, a.k.a. Susan Storm, charter member of the Fantastic Four.

Although female characters would develop and become cornerstones of the Marvel Universe, their early treatment would show a struggle to be recognized as equals. Supergirl of DC Comics went through such a struggle as she fights to gain an identity beyond being "Superman's kid cousin".

=== Bronze Age of Comic Books ===
The Bronze Age of Comics reflected many of the feminist tensions of the era. The number of female characters, both heroes and villains, increased substantially in the 1970s, in response to the feminist movement, and in an attempt to diversify readership. However, these characters were often stereotypical, such as the man-hating Thundra or angry-feminist parody Man-killer.

Meanwhile in the underground comix circle The Women's Liberation Basement Press published a one-shot comic titled It Ain't Me, Babe in 1970 that featured many of the most famous female comic icons. This would evolve into Wimmen's Comix, an underground anthology series that would run through 1992, dealing with many controversial women's issues. Other all-female underground anthology series soon followed, the most notable being Tits & Clits Comix and Twisted Sisters, as well as the one-shot Mama! Dramas, published by Educomics.

The character Ms. Marvel is an example of Marvel's struggle with the issues of feminism. Debuting in 1977 at the height of the women's liberation movement, with the honorific "Ms." part of her cryptonym, the heroine's name was a strong symbol of feminist solidarity, as was her civilian job as editor of Woman magazine (a reference to the then-new Ms. Magazine). The first couple of issues of her self-titled comic book even included the cover line "This Female Fights Back!" The reality, however, was decidedly mixed. The controversial Ms. Marvel rape was handled poorly by Marvel Comics: Ms. Marvel was the victim of a man's attempt to escape from Limbo, and gave birth to the child of the man that raped her; her teammates were confused as to why she would not want the child, and she subsequently fell in love with him and moved into Limbo with him. Chris Claremont, a writer most famous for the Uncanny X-Men series, shared in the disgust in the misogynistic treatment of Danvers in that story and wrote a follow-up in response. Danvers, who has returned to Earth and is living at Professor Charles Xavier's school, is visited by The Avengers. At that meeting, Danvers rebukes the team for their treatment at her being raped and manipulated by Marcus while they were being complicit in that violation, condemning it as a betrayal by them, which the team comes to agree to their profound chagrin.

Throughout most of the Silver and Bronze Age, women in comics were not given leadership positions. In the 1980s, under writer-artist John Byrne, Invisible Woman Susan Richards found new uses for her powers and developed an assertive self-confidence to use her powers more aggressively. She changed her alias from the Invisible Girl to the Invisible Woman. Eventually, the Invisible Woman would chair the Fantastic Four, while over in the Avengers, Wasp chaired the team.

Enormous impact was made both within comic book storylines and amongst comic book fans by the radical portrayal of women in the Uncanny X-Men comics, which had been relaunched in 1975. Previously existing female characters were given huge increases in superpower levels, new code-names, flashier costumes, and strong, confident, assertive personalities: Jean Grey went from being Marvel Girl to the nigh-omnipotent Phoenix, and Lorna Dane became Polaris. New creation Storm (Ororo Munroe) was unique as a high-profile female black character who was portrayed as powerful, confident, and capable from her very first appearance.

Younger/teen-age female super-heroines, which heretofore had been portrayed as inept or limited in power, were re-examined by the portrayal of Kitty Pryde, who at age 13 became the youngest member of the X-Men. In the 1980s, the X-Men met with the Morlocks, who kidnapped Kitty and attempted to make her marry the Morlock Caliban. When Kitty escapes, she meets with a Japanese sorcerer who uses mind control on her and she escapes from him as well, but changed greatly. Much credit for the "turnaround" of portrayals of female super-heroes that happened in the 1970s could be given to X-Men writer Chris Claremont: his portrayals of Storm, Jean Grey, Emma Frost, Kitty Pryde, Rogue, and Psylocke in Uncanny X-Men (as well as his work on Ms. Marvel, Spider-Woman, Misty Knight, and Colleen Wing) became known in the industry and amongst fandom as "Claremont Women": smart, powerful, capable, multi-faceted women super heroes.

During the events of Alan Moore's graphic novel Batman: The Killing Joke, Barbara Gordon, a.k.a. Batgirl was shot in the spine by the Joker, rendering her paraplegic. Writers Kim Yale and John Ostrander remade her into Oracle, a vital information broker for the DC Universe's superhero community who also leads her own superhero team, the Birds of Prey.

=== Modern Age of Comic Books ===
In the 1990s, a popular feminist comic book girl was Tank Girl (by Jamie Hewlett and Alan Martin), who sported punk-influenced clothing and a shaved head. Her popularity in Deadline magazine was such that a movie was eventually made. She represented the new modern woman as one who no longer had to live under traditional images of beauty or manners.

Due to the fan–based nature of the comic book industry, many of the readers feel, either directly or indirectly, that they are involved in a social practice. The attachment to the titles and the characters obtains a life all its own. There is a sense of social contact with the books and the characters themselves. A unique relationship is developed by the reader upon adopting these properties. This relationship has various effects in the way women are presented in comic books.

This portrayal would be put to the test in the Modern Age. While there were many examples of strong female characters getting their own titles it was not uncommon that sex was used to sell comics as well. In the 21st century, the roles of many women have changed. Roles and choices such as single parenting, same-sex relationships, and positions of power in the workplace have come to define many women in modern society. These roles have found their way into the comic books of the 21st century as well.

Lesbianism has become increasingly common in modern comic books. In 2006, DC Comics could still draw widespread media attention by announcing a new, lesbian incarnation of the well-known character Batwoman, even though openly lesbian minor characters such as Gotham City police officer Renee Montoya already existed in the franchise (Renee would become the new Question in the same story arch revealing the new Batwoman, and in fact the two were past lovers).

In 1999, a new website was launched entitled "Women in Refrigerators". It featured a list of female comic book characters who had been injured, killed, or depowered within various superhero comic books and sought to analyze why these plot devices were used disproportionately on female characters. It noted that even though female comic characters were becoming more powerful, they were still inferior to the male counterparts, which can be seen by them appearing more disposable.

Portrayals of women characters as sex objects continues to attract comment and controversy: in 2007, Sideshow Collectibles produced a 14.25 in (362 mm) "comiquette" statuette designed by Adam Hughes that appeared to depict Mary Jane Watson hand-washing Peter Parker's Spider-Man costume. The statuette has received criticism for MJ's ostensibly highly sexualized and objectifying pose. Harley Quinn of DC Comics is most famously known for her torrid love affair with the Joker and her sex appeal to the male audience. Even if a female character is not sexualized, there are still characteristics reflecting traditional definitions of womanhood. There is a habit amongst cartoonists when they characterize their animals as females. Around the 1980s was when the oversexualization of both males and females rose. Males became even taller, muscular, and smarter. Females, too, became taller, but only in the legs. Their breast proportions became exaggerated, as well as their waists.

== Critical analysis ==
=== Overview ===
Prior to the Silver age of comics, comic books of all genres were available, including romance, adventure, crime, science fiction and many others. This began to change in the late 1950s and continued into the 80s, and as the superhero genre grew, others shrunk. This also began the marginalization of female voices in comics. The portrayals of female characters and superheroes were targeted towards a predominantly male demographic, rather than towards female readers. Sexism can be found in many examples throughout the history of comic books by use of hypersexualization of female characters as well as benevolent sexism. Male creators did not focus on what women wanted to read about, and therefore did not try very hard to include female stories. Although many female superheroes were created and featured in comics, very few starred in their own series or achieved stand-alone success outside straightforward erotic works. Most female heroines in comic books were merely supporting characters; for example, the Wasp and the Invisible Girl were both introduced as team characters, fighting alongside male superheroes, and Batgirl and Catwoman both debuted as supporting characters in the Batman comics. Wonder Woman is the only female heroine studied who earned her own comic book title. It has been debated whether the perceived lack of female readership was due to male writers being uncomfortable with writing about or for women, or whether the comic book industry is male dominated due to actual lack of women's interest in comics. Primary readership continues to be white males, which might relate to the continued "overrepresentation of white men" (79% of characters as of 2015) in comic books.

=== Introduction of the Comics Code Authority ===
There is a historical context for the lack of female representation in comics. In 1954, the comics industry was attacked by parents, psychologists, and politicians who were concerned that comic books were unfit for children. Superheroines, who had made their debut in 1941, were criticized for violating gender norms and for perceived lesbian and sadomasochistic content. In response to the threat of government regulation, the Comics Magazine Association of America imitated the film industry's self-governed Hays Code with the creation of the Comics Code Authority in 1954. The code limited content of all newsstand comic books. As a result, code-approved comics portrayed women in a mostly conservative, traditional manner for the next few decades. As social norms changed, the code was occasionally revised to be less restrictive. As the direct market developed in the early 1980s, publishers were able to sell comics without code approval easily, so fewer publishers subjected themselves to it. The code became less important until it was completely abandoned in 2011.

=== Feminism in comics ===
The enforcement of gender roles within comics continued well past the 1950s. The roles of women in comics during the 1960s and 70s shifted to become more diverse and began to extend past traditional roles as a result of the civil rights movement, second wave feminism, and the sexual revolution, when more women in society were taking on predominantly male professions and advocating for social rights. In the 1970s, female characters in comics and other mainstream media were sometimes depicted as "playing with the boys" and taking more traditionally male-dominated roles, though they still tended to be cast as love interests or to take maternal roles. Prominent superheroines that were introduced during this period in comics were Spider-Woman, Ms. Marvel, the Cat, and Valkyrie.

Despite the industry's historically and culturally backed creation of a male-dominated market, there has been an increase in female readership, as well as an increase in convention attendance by women.

In addition to historical censorship, the male domination of comic book culture has been self-perpetuating. The view that comic book reading was a hobby strictly for males created a hostile environment for the female comic book reader. Women that read comics were often viewed as "doing womanhood wrong" or as individuals that "read comics wrong". This led to a cyclical pattern of hostility toward girls and women in the comic book audience. Author Douglas Wolk states: "I remember seeing a Marvel sales plan, sometime in the early '90s--a huge document, several hundred pages long; near the back, a little section labeled "Female Readers" listed the two titles Marvel published for half of their potential audience: Barbie and Barbie Fashion".

In the 1980s there was a shift in the way comics were written; instead of treating each issue of a comic as if it were the reader's first issue or an "on ramp," as it had been done previously, comics began to be written in a way that demanded continuous readership from the beginning of a series in order for the plot to be understood. It is possible that this may have led to a further decline in female readership, as the female readers that might have tried to start during this era would find themselves confused and lost.

Carol Danvers, a superhero who has been known as Ms. Marvel, Binary, and Captain Marvel, is one of Marvel's most popular female superheroes, and has been considered a feminist icon. She is considered one of the strongest superheroes created by Marvel.

=== Sexualized superheroes ===
During the late 1980s, comics had undergone a stylistic shift in terms of character proportions. The sexual characteristics of comic book characters became more exaggerated, which affected both male and female characters. Male characters were typically drawn with bigger muscles, smaller heads, broader shoulders and chests. Female characters developed larger breasts and rears, very thin waists, longer legs, large lips, and more revealing costumes. While male characters generally had a variety of poses, females often were drawn in suggestive poses that further accentuated their breasts and rears. Female characters that were deemed to represent feminist views were also portrayed in a sexualized manner. For example, when Black Widow was first introduced in the 1964 comic, Tales of Suspense #52, she wears a green dress, tight-fitting but with minimal cleavage and accentuation of her rear. She also wears a brown fur shawl on top, which covers much of her body, and keeps a hat on with her hair tied back. In the 2019 comic series, The Web of Black Widow, she also wears a form-fitting green dress; however, this one is very low cut both at the front and at the back, with substantial cleavage. She also frequently pulls her dress up in a suggestive manner. The trend has become the target of satire by feminists, especially on websites like "The Hawkeye Initiative".

=== Independent comics ===
Many female readers sway towards independent works, where there is a lot more female representation. The independent comics industry, whose products are often referred to as indies, have become a huge source of authentically represented females in comics. More women than ever before are becoming comic book artists and writers, and many of them have flocked to the independent industry. This, combined with a large female readership, has resulted in greatly increased numbers of female-driven stories in this industry. Manga, another form of graphic novel, has also led to a rise in female readership of comics. The trend towards hyper-sexualized female characters in mainstream comics is part of the reason that independent comics have become so popular among women; independent artists, regardless of gender, tend to draw both male and female characters in a similar style. When those characters do have noticeable sex characteristics, such as breasts or broader shoulders, they are not exaggerated to the point that they are in the mainstream comic book industry.

=== LGBTQ superheroes ===
Recently LGBTQ superheroes are becoming more prevalent and available. In 2011 Batwoman title DC reinvented Batwoman from a casual sidekick in need of saving to an independent lesbian superheroine. This version fights back against female stereotypes, and lacks the traditional female superhero physique. Her body sports more muscles and less chest and hip padding. She also lacks the traditional long flowing hair, instead sporting a short cut. She fights the more grotesque images of womanhood including the gorgons, her undead mother, and the ghost of her previous incarnation.

In 2016, Wonder Woman was announced by Greg Rucka, comic book writer, to be bisexual. Although, in her early comics, Wonder Woman was known to have possible same-sex attraction subtext, her sexuality was downplayed afterwards.

=== Black women in comics ===
African-American women did not start appearing regularly in comic books until the 1970s, in the Bronze Age of Comic Books. One of the first black female superheroes, and one of the most popular female black superheroes to this day, was Storm of the X-Men, who had the power to control the weather. She first appeared in 1975. In several reincarnations of the X-Men, she is the leader.

Captain Marvel (Monica Rambeau) first appeared in 1982, and received her own comic in 1989. Captain Marvel had the power to transform herself into any form of energy, and obtains the properties of that energy. She has also joined the Avengers on several occasions. There are several other characters who have the name Captain Marvel, one of the most famous being Carol Danvers, who is white.

Despite the growth of African-American females in comic books in the post-civil rights movement era, there still continues to be a lack of them in comic books. When African-American women are represented in comic books, they are often not fully human, like Storm, and are given stereotyped features and powers. Oftentimes, black comic book characters are stereotyped with ghetto characteristics. African-Americans in comics are also more likely to be considered sidekicks rather than superheroes, and they are less likely to have their own comic series about them.

=== Latina women in comics ===
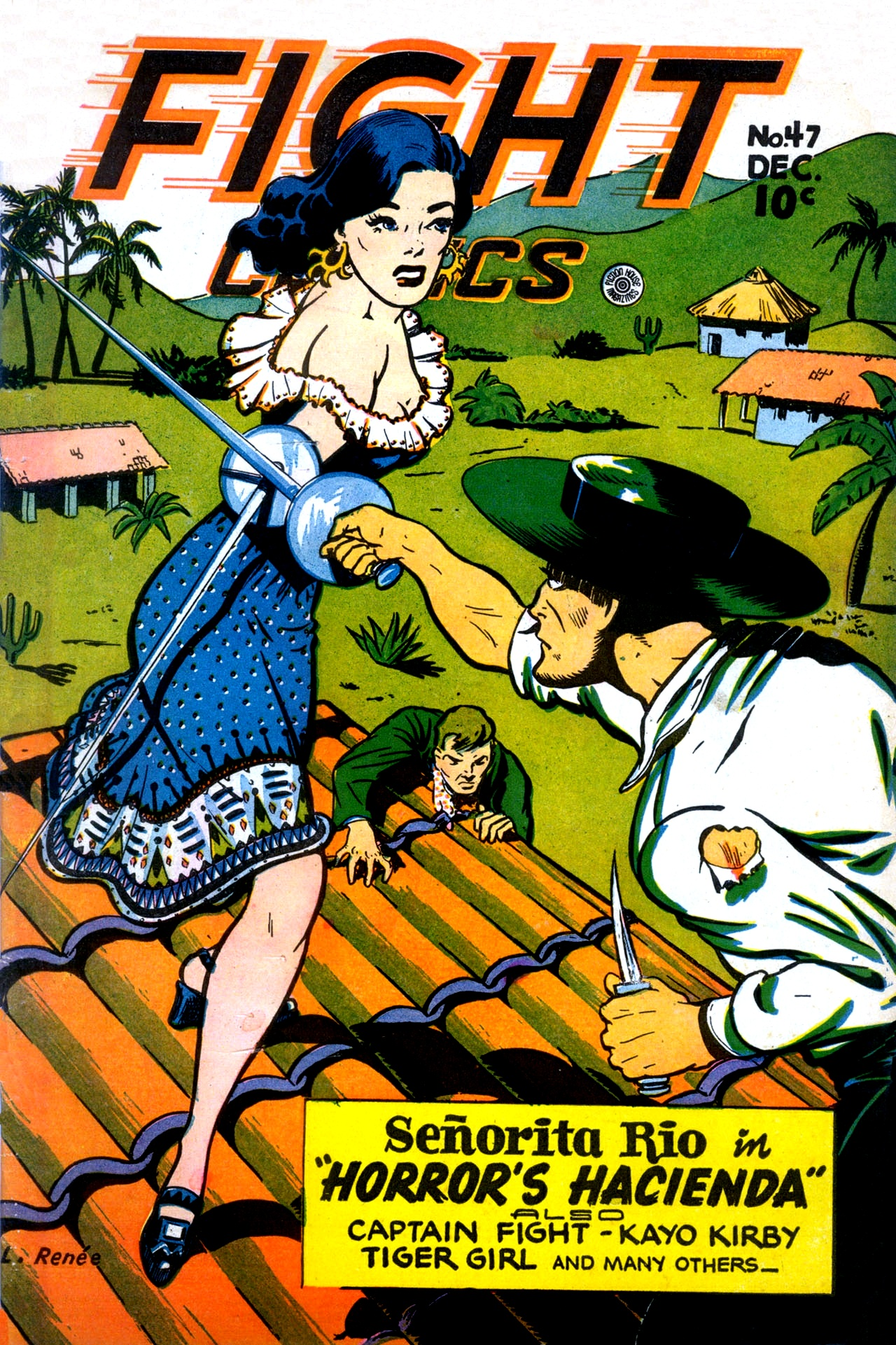
Cover of Fight Comics#47, published by Fiction House in December 1946. Art by Lily Renée.

The earliest Latino superheroes were The Cisco Kid and Zorro, who were introduced in short comic stories in the early 1900s. Latino roles in comics are often as side-characters that are of little importance to the plot. An exception was done in 1942, when Señorita Rio (Ritta Farrar) became the first Latina character to appear in American comics. She made her first appearance in Fiction House's Fight Comics #19. She was a rising Hollywood actress and stuntwoman, until she faked her death and became a secret agent to avenge the death of her fiancé. Her abilities include acting, singing, and dancing, as well as being skilled in Ju-Jitsu and fencing.

Latinos began to appear in comic books in the 1970s, but the characters were mainly male and were associated with street life. This includes popular superheroes like White Tiger and El Aguila (The Eagle), as well as villains Senor Muerte/Senor Suerte, El Jaguar, and Cheetah. The only notable female character at the time was Fire (Beatriz da Costa), who was introduced by DC Comics in 1979. She started as a model in Rio de Janeiro before becoming an undercover agent for the Brazilian government. In one of her missions, she was exposed to pyroclastic explosions, which gave her fire-based super-human powers.

Latina women did not have many appearances in comics until 1981, when Latino brothers Jaime, Mario, and Gilbert Hernandez published the first issue of Love and Rockets. In their Hoppers 13 (aka Locas) stories, most of the characters were prominently Chicano teenagers. Their most notable characters were Margarita "Maggie" Luisa Chascarrillo and Esperanza "Hopey" Leticia Glass, who were on an on-and-off romantic basis with each other.

In the late 1980s, both Marvel and DC comics decided that they wanted to include more diversity in their characters. Thus, popular superheroes began to be re-cast with different ethnicities. This includes Wildcat, whose alter ego was initially Ted Grant, but was later temporarily replaced by his goddaughter Yolanda Montez. However, in this comic book age, more Latino superheroes were more acclaimed than Latina superheroes. More originally created Latina characters began to appear in the 1990s and 2000s, including commonly known characters such as Renee Montoya, Anya Corazon (Spider-Girl), and Lorena Marquez (Aquagirl).

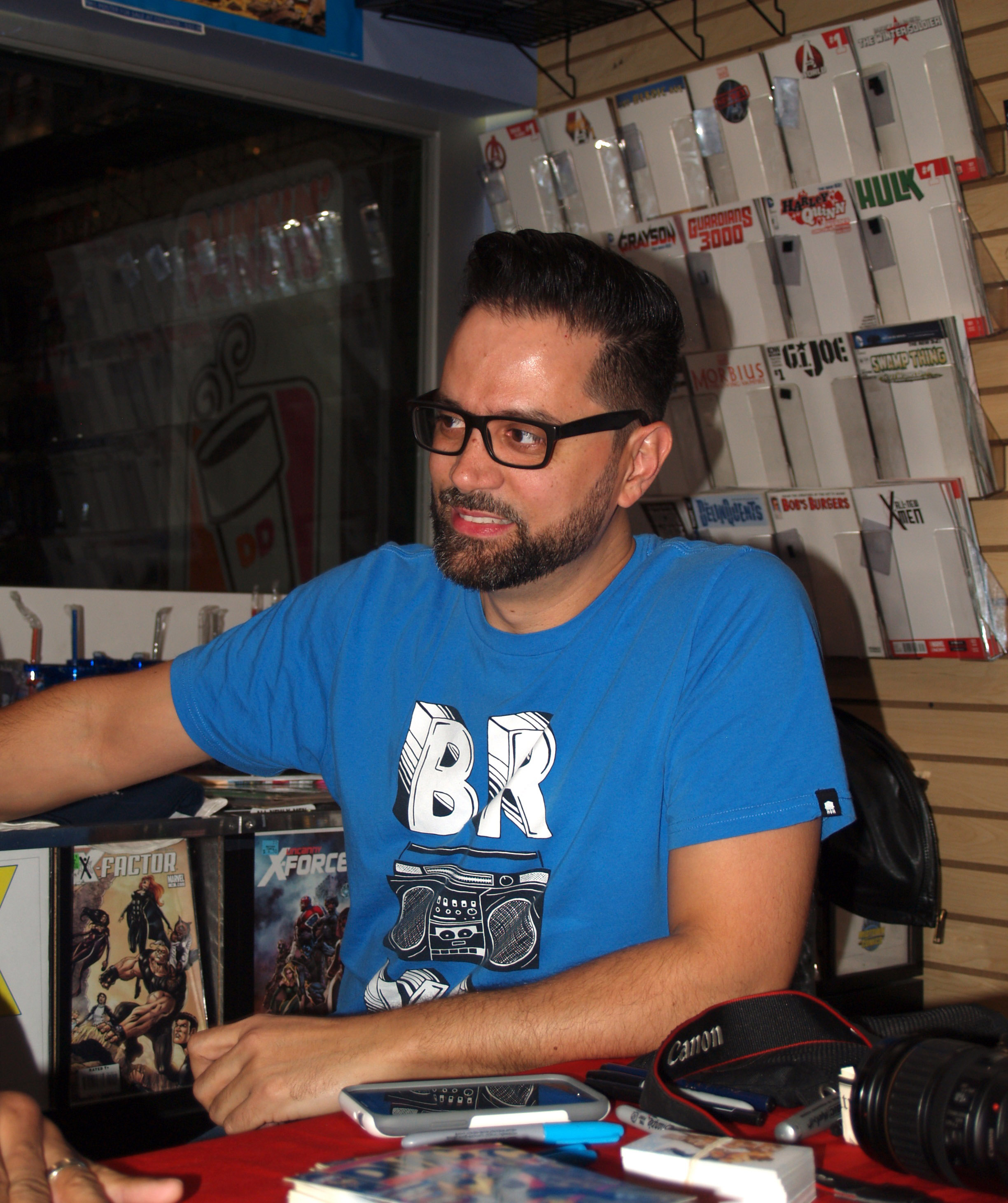
Edgardo Miranda-Rodriguez, Marvel Entertainment writer and Editor-in-Chief at Darryl Makes Comics LLC, originally created La Borinqueña.

Currently, the most mainstream Latina superhero is Miss America (America Chavez). She was first introduced in the Marvel Comics by writers Joe Casey and Nick Dragotta in 2013, but became so acclaimed that she was given her own series written by openly gay writer Gabby Rivera. Chavez was originally depicted as originating from the Utopian Parallel, an alternative reality. What is most notable about Chavez's character is that although she is illustrated as the conventional beautiful and young female superhero, she is also given masculine characteristics, including super strength and marksmanship. It was later revealed that Chavez was actually from Earth and that the Utopian Parallel was a medical facility she was treated at.

Latina women in comics have created a positive societal impact. When Hurricane Maria devastated Puerto Rico in September 2017, comic book writers and artists contributed in making an anthology called Ricanstruction: Reminiscing & Rebuiliding Puerto Rico. Edgardo Miranda-Rodriguez produced and wrote some of the stories in the comics, and included his original character La Borinqueña fighting along well-known superheroes. Marisol Rios De La Luz, aka La Borinqueña, is an Afro-Boricua Earth and Environmentalist college student that later discovers her powers and abilities to fly, dive, use super strength, and control storms. 100% of the proceeds contribute to the reconstruction and the hurricane relief of Puerto Rico.

=== Moving forward ===
The portrayal of women in comics was still highly contested in 2002. Despite the more realistic portrayal of women in independent comics, the mainstream comic book industry still, as of that year, sometimes struggled with portraying women realistically. As of 2013 there continued to be a difference in the way female superheroes are treated (by both their on-page counterparts and their writers) when compared to male superheroes of the same caliber. However, more recently steps have been made towards equality and de-sexualization with specific stories and comics.

There is a distinct effort being made by some to address these issues; there is a Gender in Comics panel at San Diego Comic Con which, in 2014, "included noted comic book journalists, editors, writers and behind-the-scenes figures all currently working to further awareness of the gender issues within the comic book industry". One of the panelists, Laura Hudson, said this in regards to gender roles in comics and the criticism that they are facing:

The panel spoke about how ingrained a lot of these false gender-based ideas have become thanks to decades of unchallenged existence. "A metaphor I use a lot is it's like working in a bell factory.... If you work in the bell factory long enough you stop hearing the bells. I think super hero comics has stopped hearing the bells for a long time, but now you have other people coming in from the outside and [the gender issues in super hero comics are] very apparent. Having the Internet, having these other perspectives that are suddenly in front of us and are not subject to gatekeepers and are far more able to be heard exposes a lot of [these issues]".

== See also ==
- Bad girl art
- Friends of Lulu
- Good girl art
- List of female comics creators
- List of feminist comic books
- List of superheroines
- Gender and webcomics
- Gender representation in video games
- Shōjo manga and Josei manga
- Sexism in American comics
- Women in refrigerators

== Notes ==
^{a} Wonder Woman #7 (Winter 1943)
^{b} "The Secret City of the Incas", Sensation Comics #18 (June 1943)
^{c} "The Unbound Amazon", Sensation Comics #19 (June 1943)

== Further reading and films ==
- Horn, Maurice. Women in the Comics (Chelsea House, 1977)
- Madrid, Mike, foreword by Maria Elena Buszek (2013) Divas, Dames & Daredevils: Lost Heroines of Golden Age Comics. Exterminating Angel Press. ISBN 978-1935259237
- Wonder Women! The Untold Story of American Superheroines (2012) – documentary film
