= Appupen =

Indian graphic novelist and artist

- Born: 1979 (age 46–47) Mannar, Kerala
- Areas: Writer, Artist
- Notable works: Dream Machine (Graphic novel); Vaadivaasal; Moonward; The Snake and the Lotus
- Collaborators: Perumal Murugan

George Mathen (born 1979) is a writer, artist and graphic novelist from India who works under the pen name Appupen. He has been making comics, murals and paintings in India since 1999. He has created eight graphic novels, published in English, French, German and a host of Indian languages. He is the creator of Halahala, an original multiverse of comic stories. His books have been published by MIT Press, Flammarion, Simon & Schuster, HarperCollins, Westland Books, Blaft Publications and more.

Appupen's political satire Dystopian Times appears weekly in Frontline, online and in print. His work has been featured in publications like Rolling Stone India (monthly 2009-2016), Tehelka, Mint Lounge, Arts Illustrated, Elle, GQ, India Quarterly and more.

Appupen is the founder and co-editor of Brainded India.

== Biography and early works ==
Appupen spent his school years in Corpus Christi High School in Kottayam, Kerala. He completed his BA at St. Xavier's College, Mumbai.

During his college years, he worked as a tattoo artist, muralist, event manager, and branding consultant. His psychedelic UV art at The Ghetto, a pub in Mahalaxmi, Mumbai, became widely noted, leading to his first published work in Gentleman magazine in 1999. While doing his diploma in 3D animation and graphic design from Xavier's Institute of Communication, he started his advertising career at Bates International. After his advertising stint in Mumbai, he joined Greenpeace India on a part-time basis and eventually moved to Bangalore as its web editor and creative lead.

In 2005, Appupen and Abhijeet Tambe formed the alt-rock band Lounge Piranha with Kamal Singh. Appupen played the drums and handled the visual department of the band. The band released their first album Going Nowhere (2008). And the album "went nowhere," according to Appupen.

In 2006, he published his early Halahala works as webcomics on his personal website. The following year, Blaft Publications reached out and discussions started about the publication of his first book.

== Graphic novels and other work ==
With his first book Moonward (2009), published by Blaft Publications, Appupen launched the world of Halahala. His second book Legends of Halahala (2012), published by HarperCollins India, is a collection of five silent short love stories. Aspyrus: A Dream of Halahala (2014), published by HarperCollins India, further expanded Appupen's original universe of comics. 2015 saw the birth of Appupen's political satire superhero, Rashtraman, an ongoing webcomic series.

His next book, Snake and the Lotus (2018) was published by Context Westland and was supported by India Foundation for the Arts. Appupen's first independently published Rashtraman: Trouble in Paradesh came out later in 2018. In 2019, he self-published Legends of Halahala: Garden of the Snake, a book of two silent short stories. In 2020, he released the book Rashtraman: Divide and Fool online over 11 weekly episodes on Brainded.in. Yoda Press is set to publish Rashtraman: Divide and Fool in 2027.

Appupen wrote and illustrated Dream Machine (2022) with technical guidance from French AI physicist Laurent Daudet. The book, originally written in English, was first published in French by Flammarion. It was then published in English by MIT Press and Context Westland, in German by Jacoby & Stuart, and in Bengali by Jadavpur University Press.

Appupen collaborated with Perumal Murugan and Kalachuvadu Publications, Tamil Nadu, to create the graphic novel adaptation of C.S. Chellappa's novella Vaadivaasal in 2025. Appupen's graphic novel adaptation of Perumal Murugan's Poonachi: Or the Story of a Black Goat is due to be published by Westland in late 2026.

Appupen contributed the cover and illustrations for Ghosts, Monsters, and Demons of India (2020), published by Blaft.

In 2021, he spent six months as artist in residence at the Maison des auteurs in Angoulême, France.

Appupen is currently working on two Halahala graphic novels.

== Shows and exhibitions ==
Appupen's comic art was exhibited in Erlangen Comics Salón in Germany in 2016. In 2023, his work was exhibited in Angoulême as part of the Maison des auteurs.

He was part of the Sea: A Boiling Vessel art show curated by Riyas Komu during the Kochi-Muziris Biennale 2023-24. He joined the team again for their 2025-26 show Amphibian Aesthetics with comic art, murals, digital comics and printed works.

== Published works ==
=== Halahala universe ===
- Moonward (Blaft Publications, 2009, ISBN 978-81-906056-7-0)
- Legends of Halahala (HarperCollins, 2013, ISBN 978-93-5029-580-9)
- Aspyrus: A Dream of Halahala (HarperCollins, 2014, ISBN 978-93-5136-588-4)
- The Snake and the Lotus (Context, 2018, ISBN 978-93-86850-52-2)
- Rashtraman: Trouble in Paradesh (Self-published, 2018)
- Legends of Halahala: Garden of the Snake (Self-published, 2019)
- Rashtraman: Divide and Fool (Online, 2020)

=== Other books and collaborations ===
- Dream Machine (with Laurent Daudet, MIT Press and Context [English], 2022, ISBN 978-0-262-55129-8, ISBN 978-93-6045-033-5)
- Vaadivaasal (with Perumal Murugan and Kalachuvadu Publications, Simon & Schuster, 2025, ISBN 978-81-983564-1-3)

=== Contributions and anthologies ===
- Ghosts, Monsters, and Demons of India (Blaft Publications, 2020, ISBN 978-93-80636-46-7)
