= Kadak Collective =

Collective of South Asian women artists

Kadak Collective is a collaborative group of female artists from South Asia, who work on graphic art projects, including zines, publications, and other forms of story-telling. Its members include filmmaker and webcomic creator Aarthi Parthasarthy, comic artist and illustrator Kaveri Gopalakrishnan.

== Establishment ==
Kadak Collective was established at the initiative of animator and comics journalist Aindri Chakraborty, in response to a lack of representation of women, and South Asian women, at arts festivals and comic book conventions. The initial group consisted of eight artists from South Asia, apart from Chakraborty: filmmaker and webcomic creator, Aarthi Parthasarthy, artist Garima Gupta, comic artist and illustrator Kaveri Gopalakrishnan, typographer Pavithra Dikshit, graphic designer Mira Malhotra, illustrator and designer Janine Shroff, and designer and director Akhila Krishnan. Later members include comic book writer Kruttika Susarla, and artists such as Rae Zachariah, Nausheed Javed, and Priya Dali. The name 'kadak' means 'strong' or 'sharp' and is often used to describe South Asian masala chai.

== Projects ==
Kadak Collective's first project was a collection of comic zines, prints and postcards presented at the East London Comic Arts Festival. Their work was commercially successful, with most presented art work selling out at the festival itself.

In 2016, Kadak Collective launched a project titled 'Reading Room', a travelling library and exhibit consisting of 21 titles created by members of the collective. Initially housed at the Goethe-Institut's Max Mueller Bhavan in Bengaluru, it was later presented in several locations in India as both, a physical and virtual space, with the content being hosted online as well. Many of the works including in 'Reading Room' dealt with social expectations surrounding female sexuality, as well as engaging with feminism, gender, identity, and caste in South Asia. It received positive reviews in the Indian press. The Reading Room was presented in addition to a second project titled 'Gender Bender', which focused on gender and identity. A zine created by Mira Malhotra for this project, titled 'Unfolding the Sari' received particular acclaim, with Livemint describing as a 'distinctive' examination of the Madonna-whore complex.

In 2019, the collective launched Bystander, an anthology of visual art made by members of the collective, examining ideas of community and 'othering', examining the access that women have to public and private spaces as well as aspects of the Me Too movement in India. The anthology was crowd-funded and included collaborations with poets, writers, and activists. The project has received wide coverage and press, with particular note being paid to their use of digital art, including gifs, audio and animation.

The Kadak Collective has also expressed support for political causes, including creating protest art during the Indian Citizenship Amendment Act protests, and signing a letter condemning the Delhi High Court's direction to removal all online allegations of sexual harassment against Indian artist Subodh Gupta during the Me Too movement in India.
