= Women in comics =

Women in comics may refer to:

- Female comics creators
  - List of female comics creators
- Portrayal of women in American comics
- Gender and webcomics
