= Dream Machine (Graphic novel) =

- Date: 2024
- Publisher: Context Westland

Creative team
- Writer: Appupen
- Artist: Appupen
- Creators: Appupen, Laurent Daudet

Dream Machine: Artificial Intelligence (AI) and the Real World is a graphic novel written and illustrated by Indian comic artist Appupen with technical advice from French AI physicist Laurent Daudet. It was first published in French by Flammarion in September 2023 in France just as the technology was about to go mainstream. It was published in English in India by Context Westland in January 2024, followed by an international publication by MIT Press in August 2024.

It was also published in German by Jacoby & Stuart in April 2024 and in Bengali by Jadavpur University Press in 2026.

== Background ==
A six-month artist residency in Angoulême, France, allowed Appupen to connect with Daudet, who educated Appupen on AI. Appupen wrote the book in English, with technical advice from Daudet, who also translated the book into French.

About the book, Appupen said, "With Dream Machine, my focus was to impress upon the reader, that the hands behind any such technology are rarely without bias and agenda. My attempt was to look at artificial intelligence without the sparkling halo and hype. AI is just a tool, like an engine. We don’t have to relive one more disaster to prove that reckless profiteering is not great for us. It’s bad for the planet and all life on it." Daudet said, "As an entrepreneur in artificial intelligence, I can witness the recent surge in interest for these technologies ... However, the speed at which it is unfolding is sometimes overwhelming, even for people at the core of the technology. The hype can also be misleading, leading to a number of fears amongst the general public. We use the book to explain what's behind this technology. What we make out of AI is not a technical issue, it's a political choice."

== Synopsis ==
In the book, Hugo is a Parisian researcher who has created a start-up on the AI models at the core of the ChatGPT revolution. On the verge of selling his technology to the digital conglomerate REAL, he wonders about the true motivations of his mysterious client. Is this the deal every entrepreneur dreams of, or the start of a long, global nightmare?

While REAL's plans seem increasingly murky, this forthcoming AI technology appears incredibly valuable, but also a source of chaos and massive concentration of wealth.
