= Sanitary Panels =

- Author: Rachita Taneja
- Current status/schedule: Ongoing
- Launch date: 15 June 2014

Sanitary Panels is an Indian webcomic by artist Rachita Taneja. Taking a distinct feminist angle, Sanitary Panels comments upon social justice topics ranging from discrimination to victim blaming. Taneja started her webcomic on Facebook in June 2014 and has since accumulated over 150,000 followers across social media platforms.

== Content ==
A short 2015 Sanitary Panels strip.

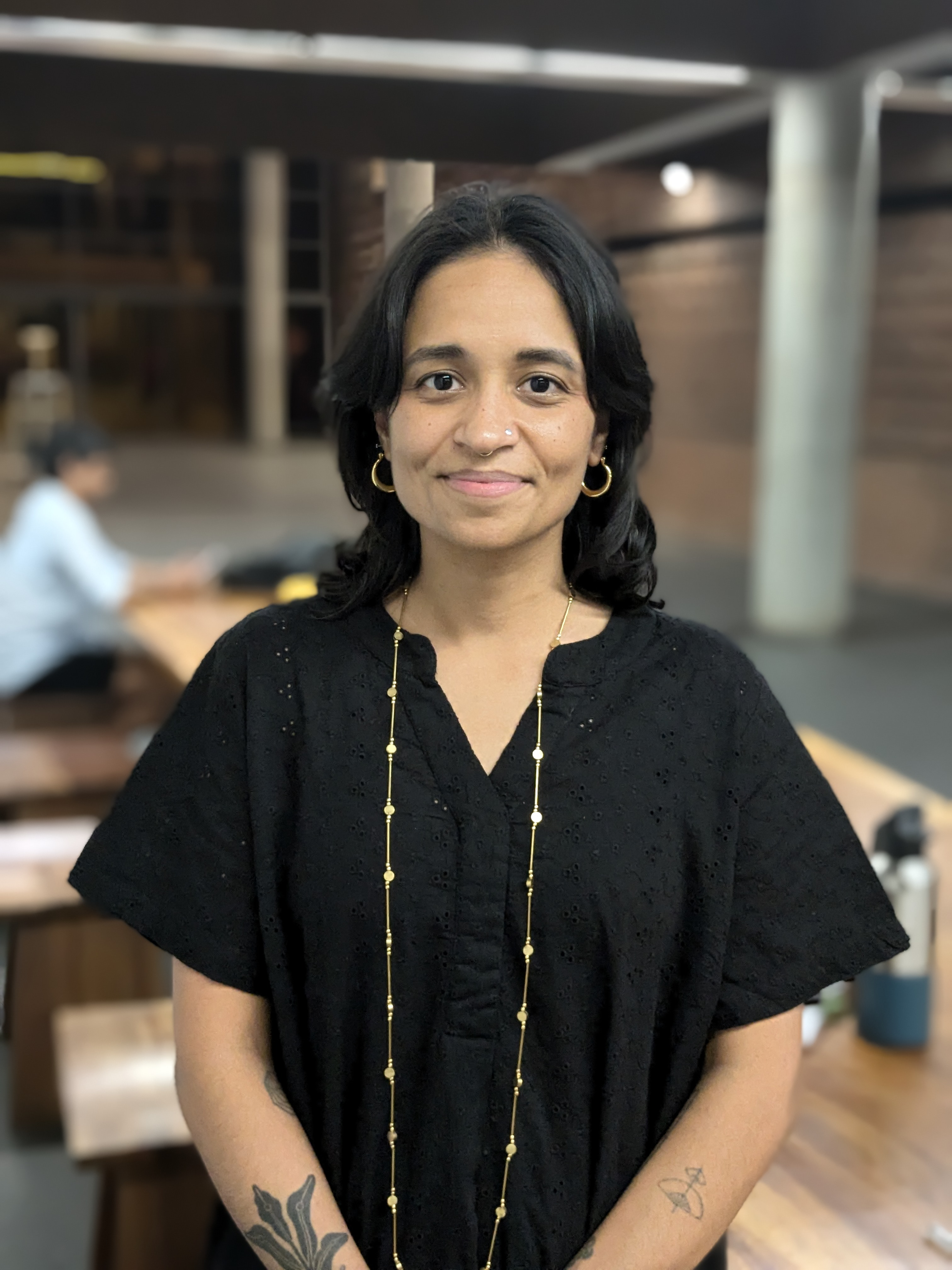
Rachita Taneja in 2026

Rachita Taneja's Sanitary Panels uses a stick figure artstyle to comment on politics, society, and culture. Taneja noted that she "doesn't consider herself an artist": though her webcomic tells short stories about discrimination and hypocrisy, its primary purpose is to cover issues ranging from victim blaming, harassment and homophobia to menstruation and democracy. Sanitary Panels is an explicit webcomic about feminism, similar to The Royal Existentials, Inedible India comics, Why Loiter?, Blank Noise, and various other Indian webcomics. The webcomic covers other topics as well, such as net neutrality.

== Development ==
Rachita Taneja uploaded the first strip of Sanitary Panels on Facebook in 2014, in response to people being arrested for denouncing prime minister Narendra Modi on the social media platform. At the time, Sanitary Panels were simple doodles Taneja drew on her tablet and shared with her friends, but she quickly found that her work was collecting a lot of positive attention, which prompted her to start an official Facebook page for her webcomic on June 15 that year. Taneja wanted to name her webcomic something taboo, and chose a pun on sanitary pads.

Taneja cofounded the Internet Freedom Foundation in 2016, campaigning for net neutrality, free speech, and privacy. She is also a proponent of the Me Too movement. In 2017, Sanitary Panels was covered by the Obama Foundation in a YouTube video, in which Taneja talks about the responsibility she feels to make her content as accurate and fair as possible as it reaches millions of people. Taneja wishes to contribute to social justice through her comic strips.

Taneja finds that humour is highly effective when communicating complex ideas to large groups of people, claiming that "the best thing about the [online] medium is its inclusiveness."

== Impact ==
Sanitary Panels has over 75,000 followers on Facebook, over 95,000 followers on Instagram, and 20,000 followers on Twitter. Taneja was one of the leading people behind the net neutrality movement in 2015, and her art was used en masse during the Citizenship Amendment Act protests.

== Awards ==
Taneja was awarded Kofi Annan Courage in Cartooning award in 2024, along with Hong Kong's Zunzi. She was awarded at a time when Modi Government led India's Press Freedom Index is at an all time low, for her cartoons criticizing the government.
