= Webcomics in India =

Webcomics have grown in popularity in India since the early 2000s. Early webcomics created by Indian people were written and illustrated by people abroad and focused primarily on the differences in culture the creators experienced. Later webcomics put a strong emphasis on social and political issues present in the country, usually from a liberal perspective. Webcomics can reach large audiences in India when shared through social media.

== History ==
Though webcomics have been a popular medium since the establishment of the World Wide Web in the early 1990s, the first Indian-centric webcomics started being published at the start of the 21st century. Early Indian webcomics, such as Sandeep Sood's 2003 webcomics Badmash and Doubtsourcing, were primarily written by Indian people living outside of India. These webcomics expressed the stark differences in culture between India and the country of inhabitation.

According to Sreejita Biswas of Scroll.in, Indian webcomics were defined by "stick figures, unimpressive humour and banal writing" in 2010, but that webcomics of a few years later are of much higher visual quality and use the medium for more meaningful content. Among other things, Biswas noticed a change in focus from political discourse to an effort to spread social awareness. Tarishi Verma of the Hindustan Times stated in 2016 that Indian webcomics are "coming into their own" due to the efforts of the young "social media-friendly" generation. Similarly, Jaideep Unudurti of The Hindu Business Line described India as going through digital comics "renaissance" in 2016.

== Economics ==
Traditional comic books were a lucrative business in India until cable television became prominent in the early 1990s. Rahul Vikram, creator of India 2047, described in an interview that he attempted to reach out to publishing companies to distribute his comic, but eventually realised he could save money and reach more people by releasing India 2047 on the Web. Vikram also described interaction with readers as a "bonus". Webcomics in India are greatly affected by online virality: according to Hemantkumar Jain, "the viral effect on websites like Twitter is strong [as] things get retweeted pretty fast and reach more people."

Success of Indian webcomics is frequently measured by a subscriber-count, though the most prosperous webcomics display their status by selling merchandise such as prints, post cards, and T-shirts. However, very few webcomic creators in India are able to do so professionally: most Indian webcomic creators work on comics in addition to working their day job.

== Themes ==
"Most webcomics today are satires and the format is suited for it."

— Shantanu Adhicary

Tarishi Verma of the Hindustan Times stated that the young generation of Indians use webcomics as a tool for "underlining their absurdity [of] current ills of Indian society." Usually of a satirical nature and intended for adult audiences, Indian webcomics explore a variety of themes, such as "Indians and Indian-ness, Bollywood, existential angst, politics and feminism." Many webcomics in the country are opposed to the status quo and existing unjust social norms.

For example, Crocodile in Water, Tiger on Land (2010) satirises socio-political-economic issues such as the 2015 Bihar cheating scandal. Digital politics-researcher Sriram Mohan described the webcomic as progressive, liberal and pro-poor, saying that "it wasn't always so political. I really like it more now. It's certainly top of the pile." Other webcomics, such as Rachita Taneja's Sanitary Panels, specifically focus on gender issues in the country. Many webcomic creators, including Taneja, follow the news closely so they can follow up on current events.

Some Indian webcomics present traditional aspects of the country's culture. Meenakshi Krishnamoorthy's Kinnari is highly influenced by Indian mythology, creating unusual spins on ancient literature. To involve foreign readers more, Krishnamoorthy incorporates footnotes explaining the source material of her comics. Aarthi Parthasarathy and Kaveri Gopalakrishnan's Urbanlore, meanwhile, highlights the culture and history of urban Indian cities.

== American influences ==
American webcomics such as Cyanide & Happiness have also found a large amount of popularity in India. Cyanide and Happiness co-writer Rob Denbleyker has noted that the webcomic's readership in India came as a surprise to him. DenBleyker has gone to multiple India-based comic book conventions since. American works have influenced various Indian webcomics: Dalbir Singh created SikhPark based on the crude political humour of American television series South Park, and Aarthi Parthasarthy based the concept of The Royal Existentials on David Malki's Wondermark, using Mughal miniature paintings instead of Victorian art.
