= Gender and webcomics =

Webcomics are primarily created by women and gender-variant people

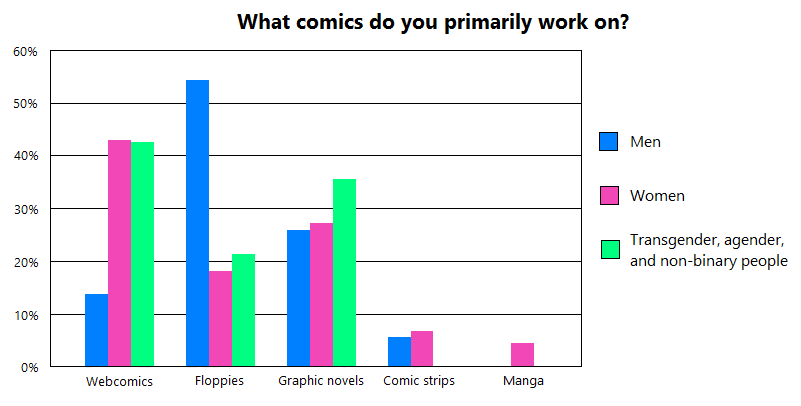
More than 40% of female, transgender, and non-binary comic artists reported to be working in webcomics in June 2015, while less than 15% of male comic artists did.

In contrast with mainstream American comics, webcomics are primarily written and drawn by women and gender variant people. Because of the self-published nature of webcomics, the internet has become a successful platform for social commentary, as well as lesbian, gay, bisexual, and transgender (LGBT) expression.

== Statistics ==
A 2015 study by David Harper concluded that webcomics were vastly more popular format to female, transgender, and non-binary comic artists than for men. More than 40% of the women, transgender, and non-binary comic artists reported to work primarily in webcomics in this study, while only 15% of men did. Harper suggested that this may be because the self-published nature of webcomics form a lower barrier to entry, while traditional mediums such as comic books are gatekept by cisgender men, though he also suggested that this disparity may just be a difference in interest between the groups.

According to a study by Erik Melander in 2005, at least 25% of webcomic creators were female. This percentage was significantly larger than the number of successful women creating print comics at the time, and the number may have been even higher, as a certain percentage of contributors were unknown. In 2015, 63% of the top 30 comic creators on webcomic conglomerate Tapastic were female. In 2016, 42% of the webcomic creators on WEBTOON were female, as was 50% of its 6 million active daily readers.

== Women in webcomics ==
Rachita Taneja's Sanitary Panels discusses sexism and misogyny in India.

Girls with Slingshots creator Danielle Corsetto stated that webcomics are probably a female-dominated field because there is no need to go through an established publisher. ND Stevenson, creator of Nimona and Lumberjanes, noticed that webcomics predominantly feature female protagonists, possibly to "balance out" the content of mainstream media. Corsetto noted that she has never encountered sexism during her career, though Stevenson described some negative experiences with Reddit and 4Chan, websites outside of their usual channels.

Oliver Sava of The A.V. Club pointed out in 2016 that there exists a growing community of black women cartoonists creating webcomics.

In India, where rape of women has been a big issue in the 2010s, Indian webcomics formed a platform for artists to poke fun at patriarchy, feminism, and various other gender-related topics. According to human rights activist and webcomic creator Rachita Taneja, humor aids in communicating complex subjects to large groups of people, and the inclusiveness of webcomics makes it an excellent medium for said communication.

Girlamatic was a subscriber-based webcomic site founded by Joey Manley in 2003. The website's purpose was to syndicate webcomics created primarily by women and marketed primarily to women. Girlamatic included webcomics created by various well-known female webcomic artists, including Shaenon Garrity and Lea Hernandez. The syndicate had won various Lulu awards for being among the "most women-friendly and reader- friendly work in comics." Writing for Comixpedia, Eric Burns voiced his worries that initiatives like Girlamatic section off and divide the webcomic community, making it less likely for male readers to come across the works of female webcartoonists.

== LGBT in webcomics ==
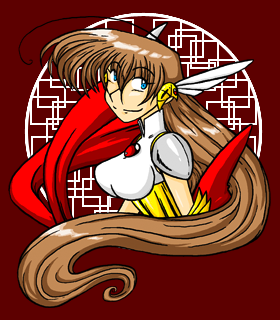
Sparkling Generation Valkyrie Yuuki features a scenario with transgender issues.

There exist a large amount of openly gay and lesbian comic creators that self-publish their work on the internet. These include amateur works, as well as more "mainstream" works, such as Kyle's Bed & Breakfast. According to Andrew Wheeler from ComicsAlliance, webcomics "provide a platform to so many queer voices that might otherwise go undiscovered," and Tash Wolfe of The Mary Sue has a similar outlook on transgender artists and themes.

For some transgender creators, webcomics can also double as autobiographies or autobiografiction. Some of these webcomics are written and illustrated by transgender individuals, accurately depicting their thoughts and reality. An example of such would be Rooster Tails.

=== Impact ===
LGBT representation in webcomics is also thought to be a form of participatory media, since it may "encourage users to contribute voices and resources, such as time and money, toward shared projects". Readers of webcomics primarily containing LGBT topics also have the opportunity to undergo transformative learning.

== See also ==
- Women in comics
- Sexism in American comics
- List of LGBT-related webcomics
