= Crocodile in Water, Tiger on Land =

Indian webcomic series

Crocodile in Water, Tiger on Land (sometimes shortened as CWTL) is an Indian webcomic series by an anonymous writer and illustrator duo. The webcomic launched in 2010 and is named after a Bengali saying similar to "being caught between the devil and the deep blue sea." It uses visual metaphors in order to communicate ideas related to the Indian social and political system, as well as the "absurdity of modern life." A book printing the webcomic was released in 2015.

== Content ==
Crocodile in Water, Tiger on Land often takes the form of satirical cartoon, taking critical shots to the Indian political system and calling out stereotypes and social injustice. The webcomic also points at "the sheer absurdity of modern life," using visual metaphors to communicate ideas, such as a television set to represent the government and big media. CWTL comments on subjects such as the 2012 Delhi gang rape, the 2014 Commonwealth Games controversies, and the hanging of Afzal Guru. Other strips are less directly tied to current events, such as one about a boy dreaming up excuses to get out of doing homework. CWTL features a few recurring characters, none of which are named and all are presented as "middle-class hypocrites" complaining about corruption while being completely materialistic themselves. Rakesh Khanna of the Deccan Chronicle described the webcomic as "sharply focused hopelessness."

== Development ==
The webcomic Crocodile in Water, Tiger on Land was launched in 2010 by a team of one writer and one artist, who decided to stay anonymous simply in order to receive real feedback, rather than to hear positive responses from family and friends. The webcomic is named after a Bengali saying similar to the idiom "between the devil and the deep blue sea." CWTL started out as "an episodic rant" and "a trial run" so that its creators could practice their skills and test out their style. They decided to continue the webcomic indefinitely when, in late 2010 or early 2011, they realized they had readers who would wait for their cartoons every Monday morning.

The creators of CWTL noted among their artistic influences the caricatures of Gaganendranath Tagore, as well as the works of William Blake, René Magritte and Henri Rousseau. As for the writing, the duo pointed at various science fiction writers such as Robert Heinlein and Lewis Padgett, as well as Japanese horror, be it in the form of literature, cinema, or manga. The team noted that many of the works they've read, looked at, and have listened to creep in organically and unconsciously in their work.

Over time, the illustrations in CWTL have become more abstract as its creators spend more time talking about "specific issues." Past episodes of CWTL leading up to the 2014 Lok Sabha elections have been compiled into a comic book, which was released by HarperCollins India in 2015. In the book, a short explanatory blurb has been added to every strip in order to give context to the topic at hand.

== Reception ==
Crocodile in Water, Tiger on Land has appeared on and been cited by Boing Boing, Outlook, Daily News and Analysis, Cricinfo, the Forbidden Planet blog, Scroll.in and others. The print collection received positive reviews in major publications including The Hindu Business Line, Mid-Day, Frontline, Deccan Chronicle, Hindustan Times, Loksatta and The Sunday Guardian.
