= Moonward =

Graphic novel by Appupen

- Date: 2009
- Publisher: Blaft Publications

Creative team
- Creator: Appupen

Moonward is a graphic novel by Indian comic artist Appupen. It was published in 2009 by Blaft Publications and is Appupen's first published book.

Moonward revealed the birth and journey of life on Halahala, Appupen's fantasy world that sometimes darkly mirrors our own, over 272 pages. In the book, ancient creatures, gods and men play out their schemes for control, ushering in a strange dystopian future and unwittingly starting off a series of interconnected stories.

It was selected for the Angoulême International Comics Festival 2011.

== Synopsis ==
When a shooting star crashes into a tree in primordial Halahala, it sets in motion the evolution of a world that darkly mirrors our own. In the shadow of a guiding hand, a strange dystopian future unfolds...in which trees weep, robotic birds whirr through the skies, and mad scientists grow cities from trees.
