= Janine Shroff =

Indian artist and illustrator

Janine Shroff (born 1983) is a London-based artist and illustrator of Indian origin. Her work explores themes of sexuality, identity, and the environment.

== Life ==
Janine Shroff was born in Mumbai, India, where she studied at St. Xavier's College. She is currently based in London.

== Career ==
Shroff's techniques include the use of hybrid media, combining hand-drawn art with digital expressions. She uses nude figures to illustrate themes of identity, sexuality, and the environment. Her work has featured in Elle Decor India, where she designed their 250th cover issue, as well as for an issue in November 2015 that celebrated the 150th anniversary of Lewis Carroll's Alice In Wonderland. She has also created illustrations, posters, and designs for Cosmopolitan India, Stella Artois, and the movie, In the Mood for Love, about queer lives in India.

In 2017, Shroff was one of the founders and early members of the Kadak Collective, a collaborative art project between eight South Asian women artists. She also collaborates with Kulture Shop, a Mumbai-based design and art collective shop featuring work from 90 Indian artists. For Kadak Collective, Shroff created a zine titled 'Everything Drag' as well as 'The Queen', a feminist horror comic exploring themes of motherhood.

In 2017, Shroff, along with six other artists, created an exhibit titled 'Saptan Stories'. The project was established with support from the British Council in India, as part of their UK-India Year of Culture 2017 event. The project was a collaboration between the public and the artists, with the text being selected from submitted entries, and then illustrated by the artists.
