= Royal Existentials =

- Author: Aarthi Parthasarathy
- Website: www.royalexistentials.com
- Current status/schedule: Ongoing
- Launch date: November 2014

Royal Existentials is an Indian webcomic written by Aarthi Parthasarathy and further produced by Chaitanya Krishnan. Using Mughal miniature paintings with overlaid dialogue, Royal Existentials comments upon contemporary politics, social issues, and philosophy.

== Content ==
Each strip of Aarthi Parthasarathy's Royal Existentials consists of a repeated classic Mughal miniature painting with dialogue overlaid, each panel having different dialogue. The webcomic updates weekly, and the dialogue presented in the webcomic comments on the social or political events of the time. Despite the repetitive panels, the webcomic maintains a clear rhythm by using well-placed pauses in its writing. Parthasarathy frequently comments upon the Jaipur, Kangra, and Deccan paintings she uses as well, noting the representation of women and their place in court in her dialogues.

== Development ==
Parthasarathy founded The Royal Existentials in November 2014, after being inspired by David Malki's Wondermark, which injects Victorian art with humorous speech balloons. She came across Wondermark in 2010, and quickly thought that someone should do an Indian version of the same concept. The Royal Existentials is a product of Falana Dimka films, a company Parthasarathy co-founded with Chaitanya Krishnan. The lay-out of the webcomic and any additional art is provided by Krishnan, who said about the use of Mughal miniatures that their "opulent setting ... lends itself to talking about issues like inequality." Parthasarathy found that the often anonymous subjects of these paintings lend themselves well for her scripts.

Parthasarathy sits down to write a new strip every Thursday, so that she can publish it on the following day. The Royal Existentials doesn't explicitly cover whatever is in the news, but rather focuses on whatever is on its creator's mind, and can take on a philosophical perspective as well. Parthasarathy described her webcomic as a "diary of thoughts." In an interview with The Bangalore Mirror, Parthasarathy stated that there's a "serious imbalance" in how feminists are represented in media, and that she "wanted to correct it with humour." She noted that her goal is not to "manage her frustration with patriarchy" (a notion she finds "ridiculous"), but that she deliberately wants to change the world with humour, which she described as "a very powerful tool."

== Reception ==
Tarishi Verma of Hindustan Times stated that the webcomic uses its paintings "to brilliant effect". Parthasarathy herself stated that "the best part has been that there's been a lot of discussion brought about the by Royal Existentials. People have come up to me and just had great, long conversations." Bengaluru-based performing artist Avril Stormy Unger stated that The Royal Existentials allows people who are put off by more modern art styles the opportunity to understand feminism from a different perspective.
