= La Borinqueña (graphic novel) =

Graphic novel by Edgardo Miranda-Rodriguez

Publication information
- Publisher: Edgardo Miranda-Rodriguez
- First comic appearance: La Borinqueña #1 - December 2016
- Created by: Edgardo Miranda-Rodriguez

In-story information
- Alter ego: Marisol Rios De La Luz
- Species: Human
- Place of origin: Earth
- Abilities: Flying, Diving, Super strength, Control of storms

La Borinqueña is a 2016 graphic novel by Edgardo Miranda-Rodriguez.

== Plot ==
Marisol Rios De La Luz, a student at Columbia University with a major in Earth and environmental science, is studying abroad in Puerto Rico. Shortly after arriving, she finds out that her classes at the University of Puerto Rico are no longer available due to budget cuts. Initially she is disappointed, but she decides to create her own lab in the back of her grandfather's café where she will conduct research on the rock samples that she acquires from her exploration of five caves. One night, she goes to Cueva Ventana during a storm and makes a shocking discovery about La Estrella Del Camino, which results in her receiving her powers from Atabex, Huracan, and Yucahu. As a superhero with a commitment to solving Puerto Rico's environmental issues, the people recognize her as their vigilante and La Borinqueña.

== Themes ==
=== Reconnecting with culture ===
La Borinqueña is a story about Marisol's self-discovery as an Afro-Puerto Rican. This is expressed through her embracement of the Puerto Rican flag, acknowledgement of the Taíno mythology, and commitment to resolving environmental issues.

=== Colorism ===
As an Afro-Puerto Rican, she encounters the issue of colorism when she meet Sofia, a white passing Puerto Rican. Unaware that Marisol is the granddaughter of the cafe owner, she automatically assumes that she is "la morena cocinando" because of her appearance.

==== Identity ====
Identity is a prominent theme throughout the text. It is explicitly addressed through Marisol's physical, geographical, and her political identity. As an Afro-Puerto Rican, she belongs to two different racial groups and has a hybrid identity, and has to learn how to embrace both parts of her identity.

Additionally, her identity as a New Yorker is extremely important to the plot of the story. Historically, New York has been the center of revolution and change for Puerto Rico, so having a character with this identity refers to this history. The implications of having a character who is both Puerto Rican and from New York is that it acknowledges and pays homage to the individuals that were exiled to New York after the Lares Rebellion.

Marisol's adoption of the flag that was created during El Grito de Lares gives her a new identity amongst her people. After seeing Marisol dressed in the colors of the Puerto Rican flag, people are filled with nationalism and begin singing both reminded renditions of La Borinqueña, Puerto Rico's National Anthem. This is how she is given the name, La Borinqueña, which gives her political significance. She is now a political symbol of decolonization, rebellion, and pride.

=== Nationalism ===
In this story, there are clear references to the Puerto Rican flag and the national anthem, which are both important symbols of the Puerto Rican nationalism.

== Historical references ==
=== Taíno mythology ===
Marisol receives her superhero abilities from Atabex or Atabey (goddess), Huracan, and Yúcahu, who are keys figures of Taíno mythology. Atabex, the Mother of Boriken, speaks directly to Marisol, after she locates the five crystals (which come together to form La Estrella Del Camino). Her son, Huracan, the spirit of storms, gives Marisol the power to control the wind. Through him, she has the power to control the storms and fly. Atabex's other son, Yucahu, the spirit of the sea and mountains gives Marisol the power to control the earth and the seas.

=== Puerto Rican flag history ===
Before Marisol leaves for Puerto Rico, her mother gives her a family heirloom, which is a piece of the remaining fabric that Mariana Bracetti used to sew the flag for El Grito De Lares, a rebellion in Puerto Rico that was against Spanish rule. Later, another flag was adopted by a group of exiles in New York in solidarity with the Cuban Revolutionary Party. When Marisol speaks to Atabex, this ribbon expands to form her suit which resembles the Puerto Rican flag. When people see her wearing the flag, they are filled with nationalism and pride.

=== Economic debt crisis ===
When Marisol arrives in Puerto Rico, she finds out that all of her classes are canceled because of budget cuts that the University of Puerto Rico was experiencing. This is a direct reference to the economic debt crisis that is affecting Puerto Rico. In the 20th century, Puerto Rico received assistance from the United States to keep its economy afloat, but this only worsened the conditions of the economy. As the economy continues to shrink and decrease in size, the government is placed in an uncomfortable position. Due to the lack of jobs, the working class has suffered the most and the funding for the public sector has taken a huge hit.

== As a Latino speculative fiction work ==
This comic belongs in the field of Latino Speculative Fiction because it centers the experiences of Marisol, who is an Afro-Latina, by focusing specifically on her identity and journey to embracing her culture. Written by Edgardo Miranda-Rodriguez, who is a Puerto Rican, it presents an accurate and informed representation of Puerto Rican culture, vernacular, history, and mythology. This is significant because it helps to defamiliarize the Latino stereotypes present in white mainstream comic series, expand the image of Latino characters beyond the geographic origins and cultural restrictions, and diversify the representations of the Latino community. While the existence of La Borinqueña, who has an indigenous and Afro-Caribbean identity, within the field of Latino speculative fiction help to represent people with hybrid identities and eliminate stereotypes of the Latino community, there is still a lot of work needed to be done to eliminate the existing hierarchy within the metropolitan narrative.

== Creation, concept, and influence ==
Edgardo Miranda-Rodriguez decided to create his own comic starring a Puerto Rican hero. Miranda-Rodriguez was inspired to make the character when he was approached by organizers of the National Puerto Rican Day Parade in New York City. They wanted to honor him for his previous work. Miranda-Rodriguez created a comic book to be introduced at the 2016 Puerto Rican Day Parade in NYC

Named after the national anthem of Puerto Rico, La Borinqueña mainly deals with political issues such as voter rights and climate change and police accountability. Her creator has described her more as a "symbol of hope" than a "crime fighter".

Miranda-Rodriguez wanted to write from the perspective of a student, as young people often go into college without specific political ideologies and develop them during their studies. Often, when traveling abroad, students' minds and perspectives expand; in the narrative, Marisol is not just learning about her culture but her identity as well.

== Collaboration and remakes ==
=== Ricanstruction: Reminiscing and Rebuilding Puerto Rico ===
- This is an anthology collaboration with contributors from popular comic book series. They team up with La Borinqueña and some of the most well known superheroes of all time. It takes the readers on a beautiful journey of Puerto Rican history and show the strength of the culturing in rebuilding the island.
- La Borinqueña superhero action figure, created by a Massachusetts-based toy company, was set to launch in 2022.

== Recognition ==
La Borinqueña has been featured in the New York City Puerto Rican Day Parade and is now the recipient of her own mural in the South Bronx at the Casita Maria Center for Arts & Education.

== Publication history ==
- La Borinqueña #1 - December 2016
- La Borinqueña #2 - June 2018
- Ricanstruction: Reminiscing and Rebuilding Puerto Rico
- La Borinqueña #3 - November 2020

== Book tour ==
In 2019–2020, author Edgardo Miranda Rodriguez went on the first book tour for the series.
