= Aarthi Parthasarathy =

Indian filmmaker and webcomic creator (born 1984)

- Born: 1984 (age 41–42) Mumbai, Maharashtra, India
- Areas: Filmmaker, writer
- Collaborators: Chaitanya Krishnan, Kaveri Gopalakrishnan

Aarthi Parthasarathy is an Indian filmmaker and webcomic creator. Having grown up in Mumbai and living in Bengaluru, Parthasarathy is known for creating the webcomic Royal Existentials and writing for the webcomic Urbanlore. Parthasarathy became part of feminist art collective Kadak in March 2016, where she has collaborated to create Personal (Cyber) Space and Aloe Vera and The Void.

== Early life ==
Having grown up in Mumbai, Aarthi Parthasarathy graduated in communication design at the Srishti School of Art, Design and Technology in Bengaluru and went on to become a writer and filmmaker. As a child, Parthasarathy read comics such as Tinkle, Amar Chitra Katha, the Adventures of Tintin, Asterix, and Calvin & Hobbes.

== Career ==
Parthasarthy has described her aim when creating webcomics as being to "bring out historical and contemporary angst using vintage art." She contrasts the historical imagery she uses with social or philosophical dialogue on contemporary issues. Parthasarthy finds herself unwilling to merchandise her work, and therefore does not sell any prints of her webcomics.

=== Royal Existentials ===
Inspired by David Malki's Wondermark, Parthasarathy started the webcomic Royal Existentials in November 2014. By overlaying Mughal miniature paintings with unique dialogue, Parthasarathy used this webcomic to comment upon various social and political events. She described her webcomic as a sort of "diary of thoughts", as she uses it to describe how she feels about whatever is keeping her mind occupied at the moment.

=== Urbanlore ===
In 2015, Parthasarathy started to collaborate with her friend Kaveri Gopalakrishnan in order to create Urbanlore, which captures the life in urban Indian cities, such as Bengaluru, by focusing on the history and culture of the people who live there. The two form a writer-artist duo in order to create Urbanlore, Parthasarathy writing the prose of the webcomic while Gopalakrishnan does the black-and-white drawings. The two also started an extension for the series, titled Urbanshorts, which comments on India's political affairs.

== Kadak ==
Together with eight other South-Asian artists, Parthasarathy became part of online feminist art group, Kadak Collective in March 2016. Describing the representation of female characters in older comics, such as Archie, as "problematic", Parthasarathy notes that there has been a cultural shift in how female characters are presented in comics. Animator and journalist Aindri Chakraborty found that an art collective made up entirely out of women of color could address the lack of diversity at Comic Cons and art festivals. Kadak creates gender-related pieces to present both online, on the website Medium, and in the physical world, through a kind of traveling library dubbed the "Reading Room".

As part of Kadak, Parthasarathy collaborated with various other cartoonists to create short-form webcomics. In August 2016, she collaborated with Mira Malhotra to write Personal (Cyber) Space, a short webcomic that features a woman scrolling through her online news feed, coming across headlines about sexism, rape, as well as stories about a possible female president and women at the Olympics. The webcomic further comments upon the daily cycle of such news stories and how mass opinions have been turned into statistics. In September that same year, Parthasarathy collaborated with Renuka Rajiv to write Aloe Vera and The Void, which is presented as series of conversations about belief, God, and social exclusion. To write Aloe Vera and The Void, Parthasarathy held multiple interviews with people from the Indian transgender community, which she worked into its script. In an interview, Parthasarathy stated that she was curious how someone's belief systems are impacted when they are excluded from many social norms and customs.
