= Kaveri Gopalakrishnan =

Indian art director

- Born: 1988 (age 37–38)
- Areas: Illustrator, Comic Maker, Art Director

Kaveri Gopalakrishnan is an Indian independent comics maker, illustrator, and art director based in Sydney, Australia. She is most notable for her interactive illustration "On The Roof" that was featured in the Women's Day 2018 Google Doodle. The illustration depicts Kaveri's love for reading. She was one among 12 female artists featured by Google to celebrate international women's day 2018.

== Career ==
Kaveri has been writing and drawing stories since she was a child. She completed her undergraduate degree in Animation Film Design from the National Institute of Design, Ahmedabad, India in 2012 and a research-focused Master of Design from the University of New South Wales, Sydney, Australia in 2020.

In 2013, Kaveri began freelancing as an illustrator for publishing houses. She has contributed illustrations to various organisations such as Chumbak, Pratham Books, GE Healthcare, Scholastic, Instagram, Facebook, and TedX. Her work can be seen in the following publications: The Best House of All, Two, Instaa Gyaan, Before You Step Out. She also designed a mobile-comic on the Indian movie Dangal (2016).

She is a co-founder of Urbanlore in collaboration with Aarthi Parthasarathy, founding member of international collective Kadak Collective, art director for a series of educational picture books for Pratham Books StoryWeaver and works as a freelance comic artist on socio-political, educational and mental health themes.

== Exhibitions ==
- 2018 Mangasia: Wonderlands of Asian Comics, Barbican London
- 2017 Internationaler Comic-Salon Erlangen, Germany
- 2017 Delhi Comic Arts Festival, New Delhi
- 2016 Comic Creatix: 100 Women Making Comics at House of Illustration, London
- 2016 East London Comic and Arts Festival, London
- 2015 Legend of the Drawing Board, Puma Social Club
- 2014 Galleries, New York City
