= Edgardo Miranda-Rodriguez =

Nuyorican-American writer and artist (born 1970)

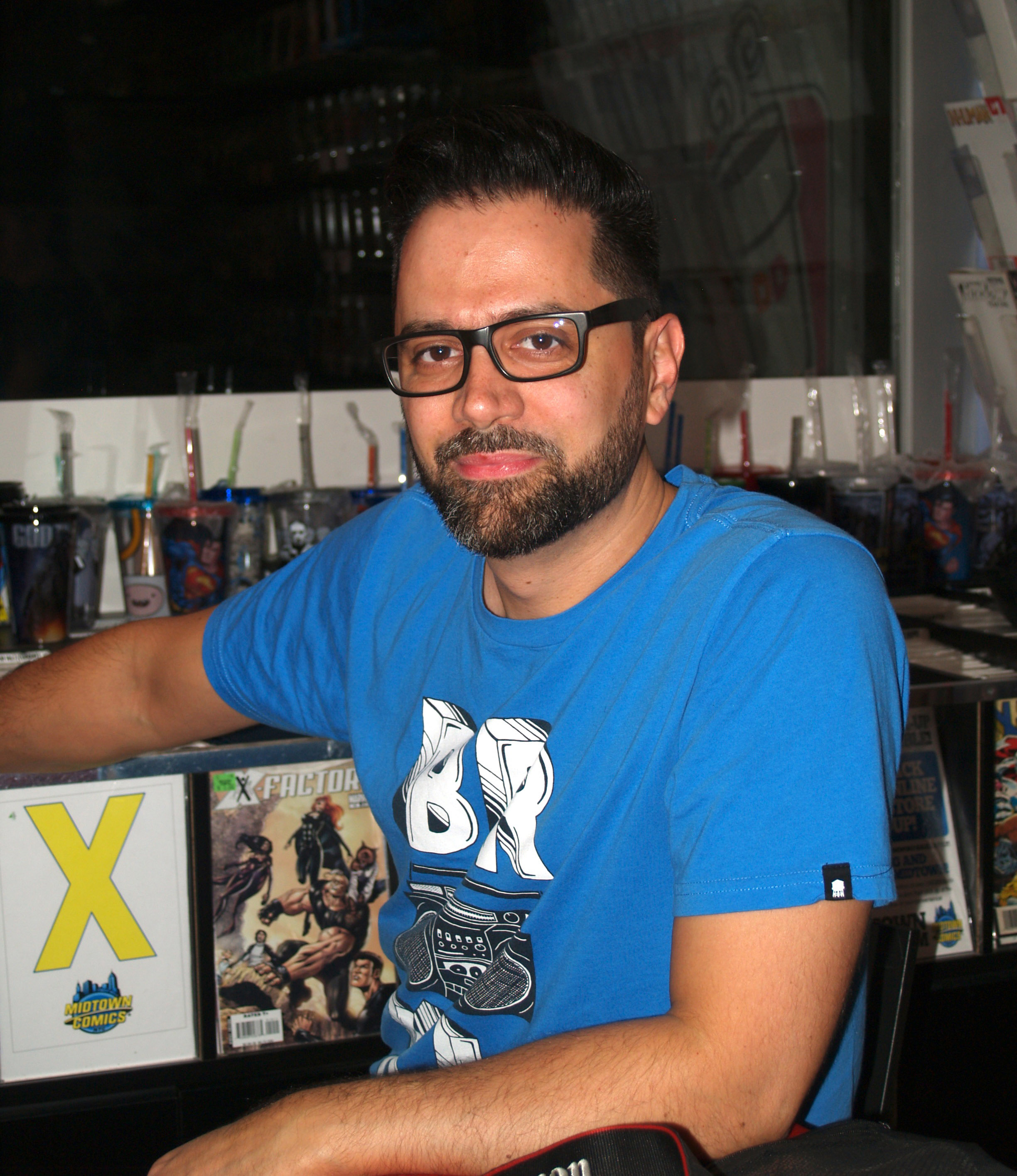
Edgardo Miranda-Rodriguez, Editor-in-Chief of Darryl Makes Comics, at a Nov. 2014 book signing for DMC #1

Edgardo Miranda-Rodriguez (born June 21, 1970) is a writer at Marvel Entertainment, Editor-in-Chief at Darryl Makes Comics LLC, Art Director/Owner at Somos Arte and Studio Edgardo creative services, and creator of La Borinqueña, an original comic book character that has grown into a cultural phenomenon and a nationally recognized symbol of Puerto Rican patriotism, social justice, and equality.

New Jersey-born and Bronx-raised, Miranda-Rodriguez considers himself, above all, a Nuyorican.

== Early life ==
Miranda-Rodriguez experienced the effects of poverty and racism as a Puerto Rican in New York City in the 1970s and 1980s. However, he had a loving family in his mother and siblings, with whom he could endure these times. In her efforts to help him find an outlet, his mother sparked a creative impulse. This love of comics spurred his interest in the visual arts, which he pursued in and out of school. In his early teen years, Miranda-Rodriguez and his family lived for a time in Puerto Rico. This was a brief, but inspiring period for Miranda-Rodriguez, when his creative talents were encouraged, and where his connection to Puerto Rico deepened.

After returning to the mainland United States, the family eventually settled in Syracuse, NY for Miranda-Rodriguez' high school years. Having overcome his earlier schooling interruptions, he would graduate high school with honors and go on to Colgate University on a full scholarship.

== Education and activism ==
Though Colgate University seemed far removed from the South Bronx, Miranda-Rodriguez experienced discrimination and racism, experiences that served to spark his passion and purpose. "I started college in 1989 and became a campus activist." Miranda-Rodriguez was active in the Latin American Student Organization and the Office of Undergraduate Studies program, mentoring students, organizing events, and creating community. One event in particular, would shape his personal and professional trajectory.

In 1992, I met Iris Morales, a community organizer in East Harlem who had been a leader in the Young Lords, the 1970's Puerto-Rican political movement. She was a lawyer and I was in awe...That year I helped organize the first conference produced by the Latin American Student Organization at Colgate. It was a Young Lords Party reunion. Morales was slated to be my keynote speaker, but after a family emergency she suggested I ask Luis Garden Acosta, who ran the El Puente community center in Williamsburg, Brooklyn, to speak in her place.

At his Colgate graduation, Miranda-Rodriguez was awarded the Adam Clayton Powell Jr. Award, for the senior having enriched the student of color community. Soon after the ceremony, he made his way to Williamsburg, Brooklyn to work for Garden Acosta. El Puente was founded in the spirit of liberation theology and rooted in the legacy of the Young Lords. In this environment, Miranda-Rodriguez was able to nurture his artivism. He curated culturally and socially conscious works, producing and promoting events such as El Puente's poetry slams in the early 1990s, some of which featured the yet-to-be-discovered poet & playwright, Tony-winner Lemon Andersen. Miranda-Rodriguez sought to motivate young people's interest and passion for personal activism and community leadership by integrating hip-hop culture in the classroom, bringing in artists as guest speakers, to include Crazy Legs, Rosie Perez, Q-Tip, Tony Touch and Bobbito Garcia.

At El Puente, Miranda-Rodriguez helped found and run an annual conference called '¡Muévete! The Boricua Youth Conference' (muevete is Spanish for 'move yourself') for almost 10 years. During his time at El Puente, Miranda-Rodriguez would be reunited with his mentor, Iris Morales, who sought him out to be the Artistic Director for her award-winning PBS POV documentary, ¡Pa'lante, Siempre Pa'lante!

Throughout his time with El Puente and ¡Muevete!, Miranda-Rodriguez also kept honing his craft, strengthening his graphic design skills working at Latino web magazine Mi Gente. This was a most providential connection, as it was where he met Joe Quesada, who would become Marvel Comics' second-longest running Editor-in-Chief (after Stan Lee).

== Professional life ==
=== Somos Arte ===
After leaving El Puente, Miranda-Rodriguez founded Somos Arte (Spanish for 'we are art') Creative Arts Services, a design studio that focused on graphic design, web development, artwork/video production, and branding. Somos Arte initially focused on providing creative services to nonprofit arts/community-based organizations and educational institutions, to include the Hip-Hop Theater Festival (now Hi-ARTs), Caribbean Cultural Center African Diaspora Institute, and ASPIRA of New York. Somos Arte's work attracted the attention of high-end clients such as Pantene, Marvel Comics, and HBO.

Through Miranda-Rodriguez' earlier connections with Marvel's Joe Quesada, Somos Arte was commissioned to curate Quesada's first solo art show, "Santerians" that focused on Quesada's characters of the same name - the first Latino superhero group, based on the Santeria religion. The success of this show and Quesada's work inspired Miranda-Rodriguez to curate an art show presenting art work about the 6 black characters from across the Marvel Universe: The Black Panther, Storm, Luke Cage, The Falcon, Blade and War Machine. It was a groundbreaking exhibit, a celebration of these characters' legacy and a clarion call for the inclusion of more characters of color. Quesada himself was a fan:

I think Edgardo was able to open some eyes of people who were not familiar with how the world of comic art was so multicultural," he said. "It's not just guys in capes but socially relevant content and a great story to tell.

In 2016, Miranda-Rodriguez debuted his original comic book character for Marvel, Abuela Estella. He and Darryl McDaniels wrote the story for Guardians of Infinity No. 3, where the Puerto Rican grandma introduces a Taino-inspired origin for the tree-like alien, Groot. Also in 2016, Miranda-Rodriguez provided album cover art for The Hamilton Mixtape, a reimagining of the songs from the Tony-winning Best Musical, Hamilton.

=== Studio Edgardo ===
A division of Somos Arte, Studio Edgardo focuses on using Miranda-Rodriguez' art-direction to work with comic book artists on "non-comic book" projects. Studio Edgardo has worked with Phil Jimenez (DC/Marvel), Koi Turnbull (DC/Marvel/Aspen), Le Beau Underwood (DC/Marvel), Lee Loughridge (DC/Marvel), and Raul Treviño (DC/Marvel).

In 2013, Miranda-Rodriguez convened other comic book artists to create depictions of the cultural history of East Harlem, known better as El Barrio. Their work was presented in an app commissioned by the Caribbean Cultural Center African Diaspora Institute (CCADI) to preserve the history of the community. The app debuted with the opening of CCADI's new location in 2015. Called, Mi Querido Barrio (Spanish for 'my beloved neighborhood'), the app presented Miranda-Rodriguez and the other artists' work as markers in a virtual tour of the community.

=== Darryl Makes Comics (DMC) ===
Darryl Makes Comics is an independent comic book imprint launched in 2014 by Darryl McDaniels - comic book fan, and one-third of the hip-hop group, Run-D.M.C. McDaniels brought Edgardo Miranda-Rodriguez in to serve as Editor-in-Chief, and Atlantic Records executive Rigo "Riggs" Morales as Senior Editor.

The imprint's first series was titled, "DMC". DMC#1 was a nearly 100-page graphic novel set in 1980s New York City, featuring the superhero, DMC, battling for justice in an alternate universe. Miranda-Rodriguez is the editor and creator, developing the 13-year old Puerto Rican, LAK6 (real name Leticia Lebron), introduced in DMC #1.5.

== La Borinqueña ==
Based on the positive response he received for the character of Abuela Estella he created for Marvel, Miranda-Rodriguez recognized a cultural void in the comic book universe and was inspired to create a main character to provide "a stronger presence for the Puerto Rican and Latino community." This inspiration came as Miranda-Rodriguez was approached by the organizers of the National Puerto Rican Day Parade. They wanted to honor him for his work with Marvel and DMC. Seeing the Parade as a unique platform, Miranda-Rodriguez proposed an original comic book to be introduced at the 2016 Puerto Rican Day Parade in NYC. With the name La Borinqueña taken from the Puerto Rican national anthem, Miranda-Rodriguez sought to integrate the history and indigenous traditions of Puerto Rico with the modern day sensibilities demanded by the multiple crises facing its people.

La Borinqueña, also known as Marisol Rios De La Luz, is an Afro-Boricua woman with a Chinese-Dominican best friend, modeling the unity Miranda-Rodriguez hoped Latinxs would aspire to. Just as important to the story is that Marisol lives in Brooklyn, and is a community activist and environmental studies student at Columbia University. Miranda-Rodriguez notes that in tackling such 'villains' as voter rights, climate change and police accountability, it is Marisol's activist and academic identity that could be potentially more powerful than her superhero self: "She doesn't fight crime, per se. She's a symbol of hope." On March 4, 2017, Miranda-Rodriguez embarked on a national [comic] book tour, starting in Philadelphia.

Regardless of the initial motivation that Edgardo Miranda-Rodriguez had that led to the creation of La Borinqueña, the outcome of the character was a significant impact on the Puerto Rican community following Hurricane Maria. In 2018, Edgardo Miranda-Rodriguez was featured in Ricanstruction: Reminiscing & Rebuilding Puerto Rico, a comic book put together by a team of comic book artists with the goal of raising funds for relief for those in Puerto Rico affected by Hurricane Maria. With it being published by Somos Arte and set for release on May 23, 2018, Miranda-Rodriguez took on the role of Producer, sharing that his goal was to inspire Boricuas (Puerto Ricans) with stories about their island to push for reconstruction following the devastation seen throughout their land. The character of La Borinqueña came back in this comic, fighting alongside DC characters such as Wonder Woman, Batman, and Superman after Somos Arte received permission from DC to use their characters. According to Miranda-Rodriguez, he was hoping to use these characters and their recognizability “to talk about a real-world human rights issue affecting real people.”

Tying it back to his activist roots, Edgardo Miranda-Rodriguez revealed that his interest in comics developed partly because it allowed him to tell stories. Books such as Ricanstruction show how comics have been a vessel for the advocacy of his roots and how awareness can be diffused far and wide.

In 2019, his work with La Borinqueña and Ricanstruction led Edgardo Miranda-Rodriguez to be awarded the Bob Clampett Humanitarian Award. During that time, Miranda-Rodriguez also began putting money from the sales of Ricanstruction towards grants meant for Puerto Rican non-profit organizations. This led Miranda-Rodriguez and his partner to establish the La Borinqueña Grants Program through Somos Arte in 2020, with the end goal of supporting Puerto Rican organizations that find solutions for common and widespread problems the community faces.

As of late September 2022, La Borinqueña has had five volumes published. With Hurricane Maria’s 5th anniversary coming up during that time, Somos Arte released the first and last volumes of the comics with newly created cover art to commemorate the struggles and reconstruction Puerto Ricans went through following the hurricane. These releases come following another devastating hurricane that hit the island: Hurricane Fiona.

== Personal life ==
Miranda-Rodriguez is married to Kyung Jeon-Miranda, a Brooklyn-based fine artist.

== Exhibitions ==
- 2007: Curator, The Santerians: The Art of Joe Quesada, the first solo art show by graphic artist Joe Quesada, then Editor-in-Chief of Marvel Comics
- 2009-2010: Curator, Marvelous Color, exhibit featuring black characters from across the Marvel Universe.
- 2014: Featured Artist, Mi Querido Barrio, the Caribbean Cultural Center African Diaspora Institute's Augmented Reality Exhibition & Tour. Work: Art Direction of Young Lords' Garbage Offensive of 1969, an augmented reality piece, part of El Barrio's historical preservation project.
- 2016: Featured Artist, CTRL+ALT: A Culture Lab on Imagined Futures, the Smithsonian's Asian Pacific American Center (APAC) exhibit exploring the future. Work: La Borinqueña
- 2016: Curator, Guardians of Loisaida, an exhibit featuring original artwork from, and inspired by, Miranda-Rodriguez' debut as a Marvel writer.
- 2016: Curator, Café con Comics: Boricuas in the Comic Book Industry, an exhibit featuring Puerto Rican comic book artists at the Center for Puerto Rican Studies, at Hunter College, CUNY.
- 2017: Featured Artist, Citicien - Nueva York: A #DefendPR Multimedia Art Group Exhibit, a traveling exhibition which premiered at Clemente Soto Vélez Cultural & Educational Center.

== See also ==
- Puerto Rican comic books
- American comic books
- Graphic novel
