= Jadavpur University Press =

- Founded: 2012
- Country of origin: India
- Headquarters location: Kolkata, West Bengal
- Publication types: Books
- Official website: jadunivpress.org

Jadavpur University Press (JUP) is the university press of Jadavpur University in Kolkata, West Bengal, India. It publishes academic works, translations, fiction, poetry and illustrated books. It publishes in Bengali and English.

== History ==
The press was inaugurated at the Kolkata Book Fair on 1 February 2012. Its first books included Bengali translations of selections from the notebooks of Leonardo da Vinci and The Prince by Niccolò Machiavelli. Both works were translated directly from Italian. The press began work on a graphic anthology of short stories by Rabindranath Tagore in 2014. The project was planned with HarperCollins as co-publisher.

The press also obtained the rights for a Bengali translation of Haruki Murakami's Kafka on the Shore. The book was translated directly from Japanese. The Indian Express reported in 2015 that it was the first official translation of a Murakami work into an Indian language.

Columbia University Press in 2022 announced the Bengal Library series of Bengali texts in translation. Abhijit Gupta, director of Jadavpur University Press, was named as one of the series editors. The other editors included Gayatri Chakravorty Spivak and Thibaut d'Hubert.

Jadavpur University Press in 2025 published selected works by Taras Shevchenko in Bengali. The book was presented at the 2026 Kolkata Book Fair.

== Awards ==
Paramita Brahmachari in 2023 won the Oxford Bookstore Book Cover Prize for the cover of Pebble Monkey. The book was written by Manindra Gupta and translated into English by Arunava Sinha. It was published by Jadavpur University Press in 2022.

== Publishing ==
JUP publishes academic books as well as books for general readers. Its list includes original works, translations and new editions of older texts. The Print reported in 2025 that the press also publishes fiction, graphic works and art books.

The press has published translations from several languages. These include Japanese, German, Portuguese, Polish and French. It has also worked with foreign institutions on translation projects.

One of its projects was Famine Tales: A Graphic Anthology. The book grew out of research involving Jadavpur University and the University of Exeter. It covers historical famines in India and Britain through comics, illustrations and patachitra.

Anandabazar Patrika reported that Jadavpur University continued to provide part of the press's financial support. The press was also using book sales and publishing projects to increase its own revenue.
