= 2003 in webcomics =

Notable events of 2003 in webcomics.

== Events ==
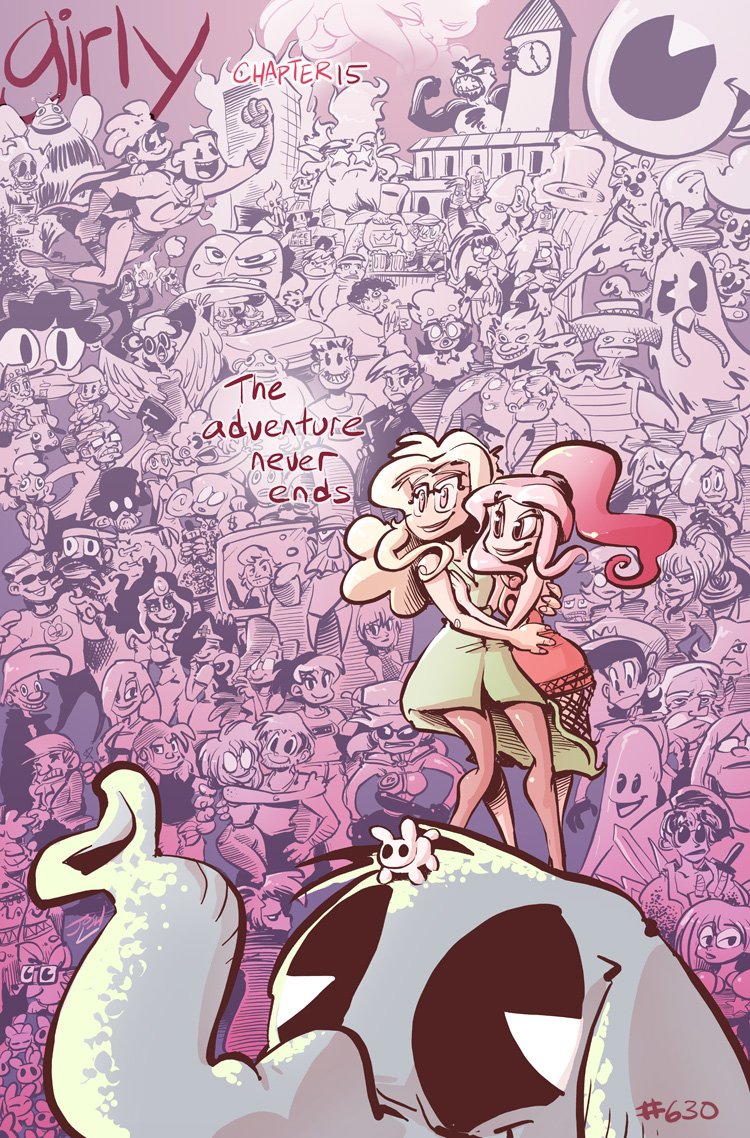
Jackie Lesnick's Girly ran from 2003 to 2010.

- Mike Krahulik and Jerry Holkins of Penny Arcade founded Child's Play.

=== Awards ===
- Web Cartoonist's Choice Awards, "Outstanding Comic" won by Justine Shaw's Nowhere Girl.
- Ignatz Awards, "Outstanding Online Comic" won by James Kochalka's American Elf.
- Justine Shaw's Nowhere Girl becomes the first webcomic to be nominated for an Eisner Award.

=== Webcomics started ===
- January 1 — A Modest Destiny by Sean Howard
- February 1 — Dinosaur Comics by Ryan North
- February 7 — A Softer World by Joey Comeau and Emily Horne
- February 10 — Least I Could Do by Ryan Sohmer and Lar DeSouza
- February — Idiot Box by Matt Bors
- March — Digger by Ursula Vernon
- April 6 — Girly by Jackie Lesnick
- April 20 — No Rest for the Wicked by Andrea L. Peterson
- May — Wondermark by David Malki
- June 30 — Badmash by Sandeep Sood, Nimesh Patel, and Sanjay Shah
- June 30 — The Right Number by Scott McCloud
- August 2 — Questionable Content by Jeph Jacques
- August 4 — Loxie & Zoot by Stephen Crowley
- September 25 —The Order of the Stick by Rich Burlew
- September — Smithson by Shaenon K. Garrity et al.
- October 22 — Twokinds by Thomas Fischbach
- Anima: Age of the Robots by Johnny Tay
- El Listo by Xavier Àgueda
- Hetalia: Axis Powers by Hidekaz Himaruya
- Inverloch by Sarah Ellerton
- Li'l Mell and Sergio by Shaenon K. Garrity et al.
- Unspeakable Vault (Of Doom) by François Launet

=== Webcomics ended ===
- Leisure Town by Tristan A. Farnon, 1997 – 2003
- Makeshift Miracle by Jim Zubkavich, September 10, 2001 – March 4, 2003
- Zombie and Mummy by Olia Lialina and Dragan Espenschied, 2001 – 2003
