= AMD (disambiguation) =

AMD, or Advanced Micro Devices, is an American multinational semiconductor company.

AMD may also refer to:

== People ==
- Mary Andrews Denison (1826-1911) American author, who wrote under these initials

== Science/technology ==
- Acid mine drainage
- Age-related macular degeneration of the eye
- Algorithmic mechanism design, a field of economics
- AMD64 CPU architecture
- AMD-65 Automata Módosított Deszantfegyver (Automatic Modified Descent), a Hungarian rifle
- Asynchronous module definition, a JavaScript API
- amd, the Berkeley Automounter, a daemon on Unix-like operating systems
- Alpha-mannosidosis, a lysosomal storage disorder

== Business/politics ==
- Certified AM Directional Specialist, in broadcasting
- Aircraft Manufacturing and Design
- Alliance for a Democratic Mauritania, or Alliance pour une Mauritanie démocratique, a former political movement
- AMD Holdings Inc., an American doll manufacturer
- American Micro Devices, a 1964–1965 technology company
- Arbeitsstelle für Molekularelektronik Dresden, a former name for technology company ZMDI
- Armenian dram, ISO 4217 currency code AMD
- Atomic Minerals Directorate for Exploration and Research, Hyderabad, India
- Avions Marcel Dassault, a French aircraft manufacturer

== Other ==
- AMD Academy of Fashion and Design, Germany
- A Modest Destiny, a webcomic by Sean Howard
- Sardar Vallabhbhai Patel International Airport, Ahmedabad, India, IATA code AMD
- Allied Masonic Degrees, an appendant order of Freemasonry that exists in some Masonic jurisdictions

== See also ==
- `Amd
- Amdahl
