= AAMD =

AAMD may refer to:

- American Academy of Medical Directors, former name of the American Association for Physician Leadership
- American Association on Mental Deficiency, a former name of the American Association on Intellectual and Developmental Disabilities
- Association of Art Museum Directors, organization of art museum directors

== See also ==
- AMD (disambiguation)
