= Barry K. Herman =

Medical doctor in the United States of America

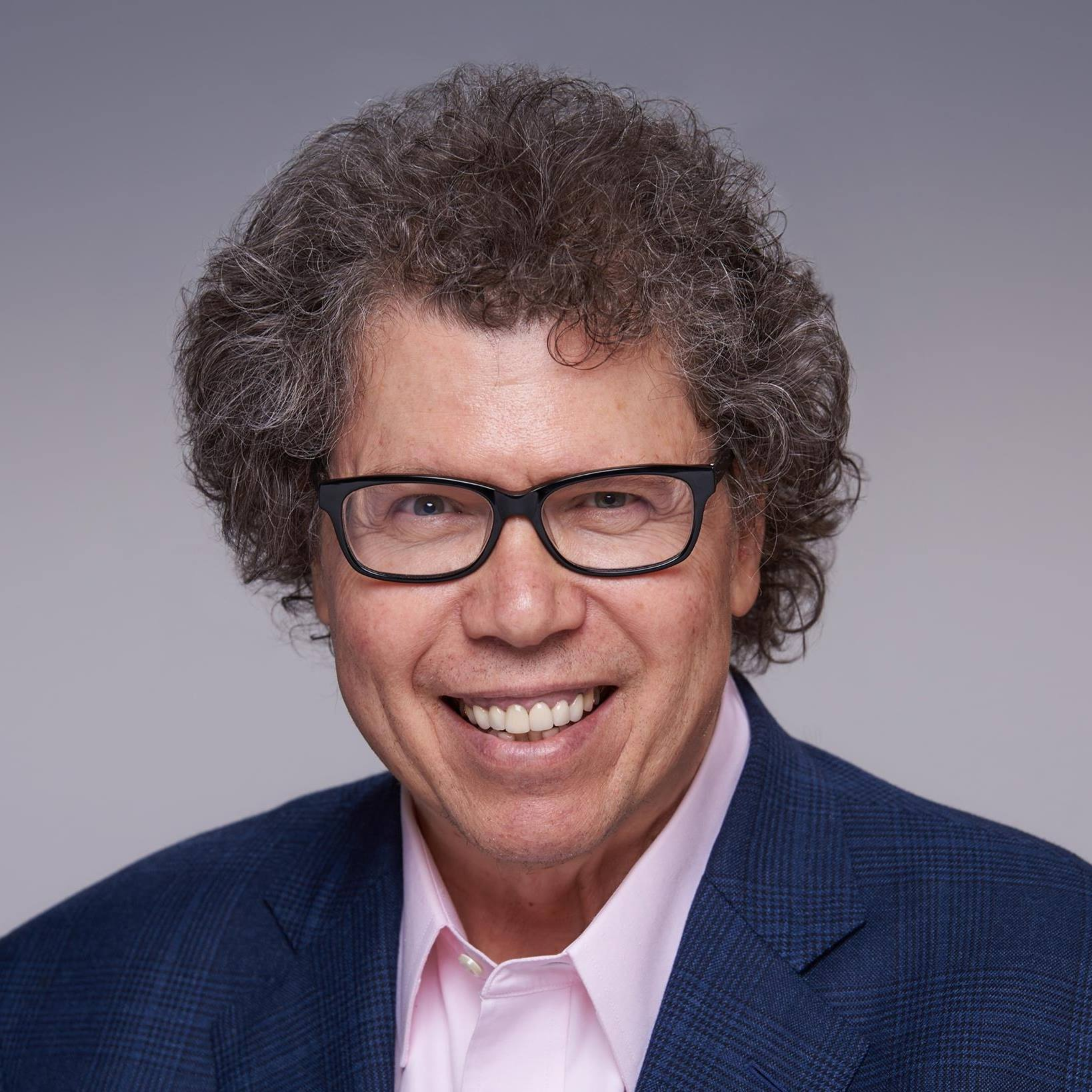
Barry K. Herman, M.D., M.M.M

Barry Keith Herman is an American board certified adult and child and adolescent psychiatrist, psychiatric administrator, and physician executive. He currently is Chief Medical Officer of Atentiv Health, a digital health specialty provider, since March, 2020. Immediately prior, he was Senior Vice President and Chief Medical Officer of Tris Pharmaceuticals, Inc. in Monmouth Junction, NJ. He left this position at Tris in January 2020. Herman's interests include psychiatric administration and management, healthcare policy, and psychopharmacological research. He has spoken and written frequently on the topic of physician leadership and management. He is the author of over 100 scientific abstracts and manuscripts, and is frequently quoted in the media. His psychiatric research has been widely cited. Herman is the Past President of the American Association of Psychiatric Administrators (now called the American Association for Psychiatric Administration and Leadership (AAPAL)), and is on its Executive Council. He is the recipient of the 2017 American Psychiatric Association Administrative Psychiatry Award.

== Early life ==
Herman was born on June 4, 1950, at Hartford Hospital in Hartford, Connecticut. His father, Joseph Louis Herman (1924–1991), was an optometrist, and his mother, Mae Louise Rivkin Herman Askinas (1925-) was a secondary school English teacher. He has two younger brothers, Richard S. Herman, an emergency medicine physician in the Boston, Massachusetts area, and Jonathan R. Herman (1957-), a professor emeritus of Religious Studies at Georgia State University in Atlanta, Georgia. Herman grew up in West Hartford, Connecticut, and attended local public schools. He graduated from Conard High School in West Hartford in 1968. He was raised Jewish.

== Education ==
Herman graduated from Clark University in Worcester, Massachusetts, in 1974 with a B.A. degree in Psychology. He attended the University of Southern California in Los Angeles, California from 1973 to 1976 in a non-graduate, pre-medical curriculum program. He received his medical degree from Tufts University School of Medicine in Boston in 1980. He did an internal medicine residency at Santa Barbara Cottage Hospital in Santa Barbara, California, from 1980 to 1981. His Psychiatric Residency Training was at Herrick Hospital and Health Center (now Sutter Alta Bates Summit Medical Center: Herrick Campus) in Berkeley, California, from 1981 to 1983 followed by a Fellowship in Child Psychiatry at Stanford University School of Medicine Children's Hospital at Stanford in Palo Alto, California, from 1983 to 1985. Herman received a master's degree in Medical Management (M.M.M.) from Tulane University School of Public Health and Tropical Medicine Health Systems Management in New Orleans, LA in 1998.

== Boyer House Foundation ==
In 1984, while still a Fellow in Child Psychiatry at Stanford, Herman, along with Robert Jones, M.D., J.D., co-founded Boyer House Foundation, a non-profit organization named after his teacher and mentor, L. Bryce Boyer, M.D. (1916–2000), a psychoanalyst practicing in Berkeley and on the faculty at Herrick Hospital. The organization, in large part made possible through a donation from a former patient of Boyer's, Mary S. Sigourney, was dedicated to promoting the treatment of severely mentally ill patients, and opened a long-term residential treatment center, Boyer House in San Rafael, California, which is no longer in operation. Herman was chief executive officer and chairman of the Board of Directors of Boyer House Foundation from 1984 to 1993. During their tenure at Boyer House Foundation, Herman and Jones held two national medical conferences in San Francisco on the treatment of severely disturbed patients, in 1987 and 1991 respectively. The lectures from those conference were memorialized in two books edited by Boyer and Peter Giovacchini, Master Clinicians on Treating Regressed patient, Volumes One and Two. Herman authored the Preface to Volume Two, chronicling the founding of Boyer House Foundation Boyer House Foundation subsequently opened a small residential treatment program in Berkeley under a new Board and management before shuttering its doors permanently.

== Early career ==
Following his fellowship training at Stanford, Herman completed a 3-year service obligation (1985–88) in a medically underserved area in Jonesboro, Arkansas, under the terms of his National Health Service Corps scholarship. He remained an additional year, and was one of a handful of physicians in Northeast Arkansas and the Missouri Bootheel board certified in child and adolescent psychiatry, serving a catchment area of approximately 500,000 people. During this time Herman was appointed by then Lieutenant Governor Winston Bryant to the Arkansas Youth Suicide Prevention Commission from 1987 to 1989. Following the completion of his NHSC service obligation, Herman received a Letter of Appreciation from Surgeon General C. Everett Koop.

Herman then moved to Austin, TX in 1989 where he started a private practice in child & adolescent psychiatry and was recruited to be medical director of Charter Hospital of Austin. He subsequently worked in leadership positions at a number of free-standing psychiatric hospitals in the area. He founded and was Chief Medical Officer of a multi-disciplinary behavioral healthcare group with several locations in Austin. In 1996, the group became the first national group practice acquisition by Group Practice Affiliates, Inc., a subsidiary of Magellan Health.

== Industry career ==
In 1996 Herman became vice president and Corporate Medical Director of a Texas regional provider-owned HMO, FirstCare Southwest Health Alliances, Inc., a position he held until 1998. In 1998 he took a position as a market medical director for United Healthcare in Corpus Christi, Texas.

In 2001 Herman took his first position in the pharmaceutical industry as a Regional Medical Research Specialist for Pfizer, Inc. He was rapidly promoted to Senior Medical Director. In 2008 Herman moved to a headquarters-based role in New York City as Global Senior Medical Director on the Lyrica Team.

In 2009 Herman took a position as Area Medical Officer at Sanofi-Aventis U.S. in Bridgewater, New Jersey. In 2010 he became Executive Medical Director and Head of the Medical Science Liaison Group at Sunovion Pharmaceuticals, Inc. in Marlborough, Massachusetts. In 2013 Herman took a position as Senior Medical Director, Global Medical Franchise Lead for the Binge Eating Disorder Program at Shire Pharmaceuticals in Chesterbrook, Pennsylvania, and Lexington, Massachusetts. In 2017 Herman became Senior Vice President and Head of Medical Affairs at Ironshore Pharmaceuticals, Inc. in Chesterbrook, Pennsylvania.

In October, 2017 Herman left Ironshore to take a position as Senior Vice President and Chief Medical Officer of Tris Pharmaceuticals, Inc. where he oversaw the entire medical organization at Tris including its branded portfolio in ADHD. Herman left Tris in January 2020.

Herman has helped to support the commercial launches of several medications or new indications, including Ziprasidone (Geodon), Bupropion Hydrobromide (Aplenzin), Lurasidone (Latuda), and lisdexamfetamine (Vyvanse) for adults with moderate to severe binge-eating disorder.

== Research ==
Herman's research has focused primarily in schizophrenia, generalized anxiety disorder, binge eating disorder (BED), and Attention-Deficit/Hyperactivity Disorder (ADHD) where he is widely published. His research has been widely cited. Herman and his team at Shire developed the 7-Item Binge-Eating Disorder Screener (BEDS-7). This clinical screening instrument is now used widely in clinical practice in both the primary care and psychiatric settings. Herman has been recognized for helping to raise awareness about and increase both diagnosis and treatment of BED. Herman was elected a member of the Eating Disorders Research Society in 2017. While at Pfizer, Herman was also part of the team that developed the Antipsychotic Treatment Choice Questionnaire (ATCQ) in 2010.

Herman was a Senior Scholar (non-affiliate faculty), Jefferson School of Population Health, Thomas Jefferson University beginning in 2005.

== Selected publications ==
1. Kasper, S, Herman, B, Nivoli, G, Van Ameringen, M, Petralia, A, Mandel, F, Baldinetti, F, and Bandelow, B. Efficacy of pregabalin and venlafaxine-XR in generalized anxiety disorder: results of a double-blind, placebo-controlled 8-week trial. Int Clin Psychopharmacol, 2009, 24:87–96
2. Lawson, WB, Herman, BK, Loebel, A, Lazariciu, I, and Malik, M. Ziprasidone in Black Patients with Schizophrenia: Analysis of Four Short-term, Double blind Studies. CNS Spectr 14:9, September 2009
3. Campbell EC, DeJesus M, Herman BK, Cuffel BJ, Sanders KN, Dodge W, Dhopesh V, Caroff SN. A pilot study of antipsychotic prescribing decisions for acutely-Ill hospitalized patients. Prog Neuropsychopharmacol Biol Psychiatry. 2011 Jan 15;35(1):246-51
4. Herman, BK, Deal LS, DiBeneditti, DB, Nelson, L, Fehnel, SE, Brown, TM. Development of the 7-item binge-eating disorder screener (BEDS-7). Prim Care Companion CNS Disord 2016: 18(3)
5. Herman, BK, Deal, LS, Kando, JC, DiBenedetti, DB, Nelson, L, Fehnel, SE, Brown, TM, Use and value of the 7-item binge-eating disorder screener in clinical practice. Prim Care Companion CNS Disord 2017: 19 (3)
6. Herman, BK, Safikhani, S, Hengerer, D, Atkins, N, Kim, A, Cassidy, D, Babcock, T, Agus, S, Lenderking, W. The patient experience with DSM-5-defined binge eating disorder characteristics, barriers to treatment, and implications for primary care physicians. Postgraduate Medicine, 2014 Sept Vol 126 No.5
7. Thornton, LM, Watson, H, Jangmo, A, Welsh, E, Wiklund, C, von Hausswoff-Juhlin, Y, Norring, C, Herman, BK, Larsson, H, Bulik, CM. Binge-eating disorder in the Swedish national registers; somatic comorbidity. Int J Eat Diord 2017: 50(1):58-65
8. Deal, LS, Wirth, RJ, Gasior, M, Herman, BK, McElroy, SL. Validation of the yale-brown obsessive compulsive scale modified for binge eating. Int J Eat Disord. 2015 June 1
9. Kessler, RM, Hutson, PH, Herman, BK, Potenza, MN. The neurobiological basis of binge eating disorder. Neurosci Biobehav Rev. 2016 Feb 2
10. Wilfley, DE, Citrome, L, Herman, BK. Binge eating disorder characteristics in relation to diagnostic criteria. Neuropsychiatric Disease and Treatment. 2016: 12:2213-2223
11. Cossrow, N, Pawaskar, M, Witt, EA, Ming, EE, Victor, TW, Herman, BK, Wadden, TA, Erder, MH. Estimating the prevalence of binge eating disorder in a community sample from the United States: comparing DSM-IV-TR and DSM-5 criteria. J Clin Psychiatry. 2016:77(8)

== Organized medicine ==
Herman is a Distinguished Life Fellow of the American Psychiatric Association (APA) and a Distinguished Life Fellow of the American Academy of Child and Adolescent Psychiatry (AACAP); a Vanguard Fellow Emeritus of the American College of Physician Executives (ACPE), now the American Association for Physician Leadership (AAPL); and a Lifetime Member of the American Medical Association (AMA). He is currently Past-President and on the Executive Council of the American Association of Psychiatric Administrators (AAPA), now the American Association for Psychiatric Administration and Leadership (AAPAL). He is a representative of the APA Assembly and a past member of the AACAP Assemblies. He is past-Chair of the Council of Fellows of ACPE,

Herman has been on several standing committees of the APA including the Audit Committee, the Budget and Finance Committee, and most recently, as Chairman of the Elections Committee (2014–2018). Herman is the Chairman of the Assembly Committee of Representatives of Subspecialties and Sections (ACROSS) and is the ACROSS Representative of the APA Assembly Executive Committee (AEC).

In 2017 Herman was recognized for his lifetime work in Psychiatric Administration and Management with the American Psychiatric Association Administrative Psychiatry Award. His Award Lecture, delivered at the APA Annual Meeting in San Diego, CA was on "Managing Up."

== Personal ==
His stepfather, Samuel Walter Askinas, DDS (1925–2018), was the Executive Dean Emeritus of Tufts University School of Dental Medicine. Herman lives in Philadelphia, Pennsylvania, with his wife, an attorney. He collects rock and roll memorabilia and books written and/or illustrated by Ralph Steadman.
