= ACPE =

ACPE may refer to:

- American College of Physician Executives
- Accreditation Council for Pharmacy Education
- Asian Conference on Pharmacoepidemiology, co-organized by International Society for Pharmacoepidemiology (ISPE)
- Association for Clinical Pastoral Education
- Australian College of Physical Education
