= GITP =

GITP may refer to:

- Giant in the Playground, publishing company owned and operated by Rich Burlew
- Grounded into triple play, in baseball
