= Stephen Crowley =

Stephen Crowley may refer to:

- Stephen Crowley (cricketer) (1961-), English cricketer
- Loxie & Zoot, a webcomic by Australian artist Grace Crowley (formerly known as Stephen Crowley)
- Steve Crowley (d. 1979), US Marine
- Steven Crowley, actor in Bachelor Party 2: The Last Temptation
