= Burlew =

Burlew is a surname. Notable people with the surname include:

- Fred Burlew (1871–1927), American horse trainer
- Rich Burlew (born 1974), American writer, game designer, and graphic designer
