= The Order of the Stick =

Comedic fantasy webcomic

- Principal characters, from left to right: Belkar Bitterleaf, Vaarsuvius, Elan, Haley Starshine, Durkon Thundershield, and Roy Greenhilt
- Author: Rich Burlew
- Website: www.giantitp.com/comics/oots.html
- Current status/schedule: Active (no standard update schedule)
- Launch date: September 29, 2003
- Publisher: Giant in the Playground
- Genre(s): Fantasy, comedy, parody, adventure, drama

The Order of the Stick (OOTS) is a comedic webcomic that satirizes tabletop role-playing games and medieval fantasy. The comic is written and drawn by Rich Burlew, who illustrates the comic in a stick figure style.

Taking place in a magical world that loosely operates by the rules of the 3.5 edition of the role-playing game Dungeons & Dragons (D&D), the comic follows the sometimes farcical exploits of six adventurers as they strive to save the world from an evil lich sorcerer. Much of the comic's humor stems from the characters' awareness of the game rules that affect their lives or from having anachronistic knowledge of modern culture. This in turn is often used by the author to parody various aspects of role-playing games and fantasy fiction. While primarily comedic in nature, The Order of the Stick features a continuing storyline serialized in one- to four-page episodes, with over 1300 such episodes released as of September 2025.

Although it is principally distributed online through the website Giant in the Playground, ten book collections have been published, including several print-only stories (On the Origin of PCs, Start of Darkness, and Good Deeds Gone Unpunished). An alternate version of the strip appeared monthly in Dragon magazine for 22 issues; these strips, among others, are collected in Snips, Snails and Dragon Tales.

== History ==
The Order of the Stick began its run on September 29, 2003, on what was Rich Burlew's personal site for gaming articles at the time. Burlew initially intended the strip to feature no plot whatsoever—depicting an endless series of gags drawn from the D&D rules instead—but Burlew quickly changed his mind, and he began laying down hints of a storyline as early as strip #13. The strip was originally produced to entertain people who came to his website to read articles, but it quickly became the most popular feature, leading Burlew to eventually abandon writing articles almost entirely.

The Order of the Stick began as a twice-weekly comic that debuted new strips on Mondays and Thursdays. When presales of the first OOTS compilation book allowed Burlew to make writing his full-time job, he increased the number to three per week. Since 2007, the comic has been published on an irregular schedule due to the author's ongoing health concerns. That included a hiatus from September to December 2012, after Burlew had an accident that severed the tendons in his right hand.

In December 2019, Burlew stated that the story would end after one more book, but also noted that still means "years and years" of planned content. He noted that the two preceding books took five years each, and that the upcoming final book may be longer than either.

=== Magazine strips ===
On September 30, 2005, Burlew announced that The Order of the Stick would begin appearing in Dragon, the long-running official D&D magazine. The strip debuted in the December 2005 issue, on the last page of the magazine. The following issue, OOTS appeared as a four-panel strip in the magazine's interior, but by the February 2006 issue, it had returned to a full-page strip on the last page, a position it held until the magazine's last print issue in September 2007.

The Dragon version of OOTS featured the same main cast of six adventurers, but saw them adventuring in an unspecified underground location. None of the villains or supporting characters from the online strip appeared, with the exception of Mr. Jones and Mr. Rodriguez, who appeared together twice. Burlew has stated that the events of the Dragon strips take place in an alternate universe from the online strip, and events in one storyline do not affect the other. This status quo was broken for the sake of a joke, however, when a character in the online strip referred to the July 2006 Dragon strip by claiming that "I told you that in one of the Dragon Magazine comics, so I'm not even sure that's the same continuity."

Starting in January 2013, a new version of the comic appeared in Gygax Magazine, a new tabletop gaming magazine published in print and digital formats. The Gygax magazine was discontinued in 2016 after the sixth issue due to a legal dispute. Burlew indicated in a forum post that he would republish the Gygax comics in another format at some point in the future.

=== Evolution of art style ===
The comic is created directly on a computer using the vector-based software Adobe Illustrator, and the art style has been upgraded several times. In strip #103, the curved and crooked panel borders were replaced with straight—though still slanted—black lines. Burlew now questions how he ever thought the initial format was acceptable. After he sprained his wrist in 2005, Burlew used some of the time he took off from writing the comic to improve the designs of the main cast, straightening their lines and adding tiny details like the runes stitched along the edge of Vaarsuvius' cloak. These changes were humorously acknowledged by the characters themselves when they premiered. Burlew made adjustments to the colors that were required when the material was to appear in print for the first time. The later comics feature more frequent double- and even triple-page strips than in the early days, when longer strips were reserved for special occasions (such as reaching #200). In strip #947 the artwork was upgraded again, adding volume to characters' limbs that were previously drawn as simple stick-figure lines. In addition to these permanent improvements to the art, two variant art styles are used to distinguish the events of certain comics from those taking place in the story's present. Historical events relating to the plot are portrayed in a hand-drawn crayon style both in the online comic and in Start of Darkness, (Note: Burlew, Start of Darkness, p. 36.) while events in the "prequel" print-exclusive stories are shown in black-and-white.

=== Representation of minorities ===
Burlew has said that he includes stances on social topics in his comic because he worries about the impact of his work beyond momentary distractions. He has also written that he is attempting to compensate for past instances of "unintentional sexism and/or insensitivity to gender issues" but, being a straight white male, he finds it difficult to speak authoritatively about minorities without the proper knowledge.

== Characters ==
=== Protagonists ===
The comic's central protagonists, known collectively as "The Order of the Stick," are a party of adventurers who are questing to destroy the evil lich Xykon who is attempting to conquer the world. Though they have many allies, the official members of the Order of the Stick are:

- Roy Greenhilt: A 29-year-old lawful good human fighter, Roy assembled the Order to defeat Xykon, and is its leader. Roy is a counterstereotype of the traditional "dumb fighter" cliché, being knowledgeable, rational, and a skilled tactician. He was conceived as the straight man to the rest of his team's antics, but over the course of the comic he learns to appreciate their various eccentricities.
- Haley Starshine: A 24-year-old "Chaotic Good-ish" human rogue. The Order's second-in-command, she is skilled in stealth and deception. In early strips, the group thinks of her as the typical greedy thief, not knowing that her father was being held for ransom and she originally left a Thieves Guild to become a wandering adventurer to raise the money. She develops a romantic crush on fellow member Elan and, later, begins a relationship with him.
- Durkon Thundershield: A lawful good dwarven cleric, is the healer of the party. He had worked with Roy for years prior to the founding of the "Order of the Stick." Durkon is a cleric of Thor and travels through human lands on the orders of the high priest of Thor, who exiled him as a result of a prophecy. Durkon speaks and writes in a Scottish accent and has a fear of trees, taking any opportunity to fight them.
- Belkar Bitterleaf: A chaotic evil halfling ranger/barbarian, Belkar is an erratic, casual killer driven by selfish impulses. He joined the Order to escape justice from a deadly bar fight in which he knifed fifteen people. The Order does not abandon him, despite his bloodthirsty tendencies, due to Roy's belief that he must keep Belkar under control. Belkar's loyalty to the Order fluctuates with his mood, and, despite frequently thinking about it, he never actually betrays them. He adopts a housecat named Mr. Scruffy to be his animal companion and suffers from a curse caused by his actions, leading to his character development.
- Elan: A chaotic good human bard/Dashing Swordsman. Elan is the happy-go-lucky, childlike bard of the Order. Early in the series, he is frequently inept and oblivious to the motives of those around him, such as Haley's long-concealed attraction to him. Raised solely by his mother, Elan discovers early in the story that his absent warlord father raised his twin brother, Nale, to be an evil mastermind.
- Vaarsuvius: An arrogant and condescending true neutral elven wizard, whose gender is deliberately ambiguous, causing occasional confusion in teammates and others. Often addressed simply as "V" by teammates, Vaarsuvius tends toward unnecessary verbosity, often to the point of becoming ineffective as a teammate, although sometimes it can be of value; and is motivated by the need to gain "ultimate arcane power" as an end unto itself. Vaarsuvius was married to an equally ambiguously gendered elf baker Inkyrius, with two children (who address them as "parent"), but Inkyrius filed for divorce due to Vaarsuvius's quest for power taking priority over family matters.

=== Antagonists ===
The comic's central antagonists include the following:

- Xykon (Formerly human lich sorcerer, Chaotic Evil): The archvillain of the story, Xykon is engaged in a plot to conquer the world by controlling a world-destroying being known as the Snarl. (Note: Burlew, Start of Darkness, p. 45.) While he has a notoriously short attention span and requires near-constant amusement, he is also capable of truly horrific acts of evil. (Note: Burlew, Start of Darkness, p. 98.)
- Redcloak (Goblin Cleric of the Dark One, Lawful Evil): Xykon's main ally, he is a high priest of his deity and commander of the goblinoids that serve as the lich's minions. He is motivated by concern for the goblin people and their poor lot in life, believing that harnessing the power of the Snarl will allow his god to bargain for a better place for all goblins. (Note: Burlew, Start of Darkness, p. 47.) Unlike his boss, Redcloak is a patient planner and a competent leader, and has shown an inclination for scientific thought.
- The Monster in the Dark: An enigmatic, childlike monster that lurks in darkness under a pink umbrella. Although designated as Xykon's secret weapon, the Monster is terrified of almost everything, including the dark. On the rare occasions he has used force, he has demonstrated incredible power. The paladin O-Chul deemed the Monster "a good man" after befriending him.
- The Linear Guild: An adventuring party comprising "evil opposites" to the Order. While the Guild originally sought a powerful magic artefact, its purpose turned solely toward defeating the Order after their first encounter with them. Each of their engagements with the Order results in the Guild needing to recruit new members, not all of whom last long. Recurring characters include:

- Nale: Elan's evil identical twin brother, the Guild leader. A multiclass fighter/rogue/sorcerer who specializes in enchantment spells, he looks identical to Elan except for a small goatee. Though more intelligent than Elan, his plans are typically vastly more complicated than is necessary to achieve his goals. After a couple of clashes between the Order and the Guild, he is killed by his own father, Tarquin, for his murder of Malack. Sabine later brings him back as a devil with the assistance of the IFCC (see below).
- Sabine: Nale's lover and the opposite number of Haley Starshine. Sabine is a succubus with shapeshifting and plane-hopping abilities. Though her loyalties are divided between the Guild and the IFCC, she is genuinely attached to Nale and furiously angry when he is killed.
- Thog: A male half-orc barbarian with two levels in fighter. Roy's opposite. He wields a greataxe and combines a childlike mind with a propensity for merciless slaughter. He becomes a gladiator in the Empire of Blood, where Roy manages to kill him, but is later resurrected by Nale and Sabine.
- Zz'dtri: A male drow wizard who is Vaarsuvius' opposite. Initially he's a rather obvious parody of the character Drizzt Do'Urden, which V uses to get rid of him. Zz'dtri rejoins the Guild in their stint in the Western Continent, where he is killed by Vampire Durkon, after helping Nale murder Malack.
- Hilgya Firehelm: A female dwarf cleric of Loki and Durkon's opposite, she was only temporarily allied with the Guild. Hilgya sleeps with Durkon in the Dungeon of Dorukan, but flees in tears when he rejects her after she reveals she is married. Returns, accompanied by her and Durkon's baby son Kudzu, to help the Order fight Vampire Durkon at Firmament.
- (In a running joke, Belkar's Linear Guild opposites are a succession of kobolds, none of whom survive contact with him.)

- Miko Miyazaki (Human Monk/Paladin, Lawful good): Strongest warrior of the Sapphire Guard, Miko is dispatched to apprehend the Order at the request of her liege. Her sanctimonious attitude and her frequent judgment of others on moral grounds create conflict with the Order, although both oppose the forces of Evil. Miko breaks her Paladin oath by killing Shojo, her liege lord. She is killed during the battle of Azure City.
- General Tarquin: The de facto ruler of the Empire of Blood on the Western Continent and the father of Elan and Nale, General Tarquin is a lawful evil fighter who has schemes within schemes. Much like Elan, Tarquin is genre-savvy and has a flair for the dramatic, and becomes upset when others fail to respect literary convention.
- Minister Malack: A lawful evil lizardfolk cleric of Nergal and close friend of Tarquin; secretly a vampire. He harbors a grudge against Nale for killing his children (i.e. vampire spawn) and befriends Durkon soon after they meet, but later turns him into a vampire. Ultimately murdered by Nale.
- Vampire Durkon: An evil spirit created by Hel to fit the darker aspects of Durkon's personality. When Durkon is vampirized this spirit takes possession of his body, keeping the original Durkon a prisoner in his own brain. He is Hel's agent in the attempt to sway the gods' vote to destroy the world. Sacrifices himself when outwitted by the real Durkon.
- Hel: The Northern goddess of death, daughter of Loki. At the creation of the current world, she and Thor agreed (with Loki's connivance) that she could have the soul of every dwarf who died without honor. The dwarves since became a race of honorable warriors, frustrating her plans. When the gods debate whether to destroy the world, she attempts to swing the vote to Yes, since if the world is snuffed out every remaining dwarf soul becomes hers.
- Inter-Fiend Cooperation Council, or IFCC: a trio of archfiends, who are Sabine's superiors and the masterminds behind numerous antagonistic groups and events in the story. Their agenda is to have the Order destroy the Gates and release the Snarl.

== Plot ==
While the online version of The Order of the Stick unfolds continuously, the strips have been broken down into plot arcs for purposes of publication; the plot summary that follows breaks the story down into these arcs for clarity. Burlew notes in the commentary of War and XPs that the strips contained within that volume were the first to be plotted with publication in mind from the very beginning. Several volumes have been released in book-only format: On the Origin of PCs, a prequel to the heroes' adventures; Start of Darkness, a prequel to the villains' escapades; Good Deeds Gone Unpunished, a prequel that includes stories about various residents of Azure City; and Snips, Snails and Dragon Tails, a collection of all the Dragon Magazine comics plus 80 pages of new material.

=== Dungeon Crawlin' Fools ===
The webcomic begins with the Order fighting goblins and other monsters on their way through the Dungeon of Dorukan (although the first volume of the printed edition later included a preamble showing how the Order finds and enters the Dungeon). They are led by Roy Greenhilt on a quest to destroy a lich sorcerer named Xykon. Roy is motivated by nightly visits from the ghost of his father, from whom he receives a cryptic warning.

The Order briefly joins forces with an adventuring party known as the Linear Guild, led by Nale (the evil twin of the Order's happy-go-lucky bard, Elan). The Guild eventually betrays the Order, but the Order prevails due to Roy's sudden understanding of his father's prophecy. Durkon Thundershield, the Order's dutiful dwarf cleric of Thor, enjoys a sexual encounter with the Guild's dwarf cleric of Loki Hilgya Firehelm, but they shortly afterwards part in tears.

The Order goes on to battle Xykon near a mysterious magical gate. Xykon shatters Roy's ancestral sword, but before he can release his ace-in-the-hole (a powerful creature known as the Monster in the Darkness), Roy flings him into a deadly mystic rune that protects the gate. Xykon's body is destroyed, but his disembodied soul is ferreted to safety by his lieutenant, Redcloak, in his phylactery. The book ends with Elan accidentally destroying the entire dungeon, including the gate, by activating another magic rune. The Order escapes to safety. The printed book contains strips 1–121, plus extras.

=== No Cure for the Paladin Blues ===
The Order travels to Wooden Forest, where Vaarsuvius slays a black dragon so they can loot its hoard to retrieve a rare "starmetal" to repair Roy's broken sword. The party is arrested by the paladin Miko Miyazaki for destroying the magical gate in the Dungeon of Dorukan. While stopping at an inn, the party loses the dragon's treasure in an explosion, the shock of which renders Haley unable to speak coherently (rendered as cryptograms in the comic).

In Azure City, Belkar is imprisoned separately from the rest of the Order but escapes, murdering a guard in the process. The others are put on trial before Miko's liege, the elderly Lord Shojo (and his cat, Mr. Scruffy), who informs them that the gate they destroyed is one of five gates that reinforce the structure of the universe. Without them, a god-killing abomination known as the Snarl would escape and destroy all of creation. The five gates were each built by a member of an adventuring party who defeated the Snarl in the past, and, with one exception, named after their creators: Dorukan, Lirian, Soon, Girard Draketooth, Kraagor (who was killed in battle) and the halfling Serini Toormuck (who named her gate in honor of Kraagor rather than herself). Dorukan's and Lirian's Gates have now both been destroyed; Soon's Gate is located in Azure City.

The Order is acquitted with the help of Celia, a sylph they had aided in the Dungeon of Dorukan. Belkar, however, is recaptured by Miko and returned to prison for his murder of the guard. Shojo reveals that the trial was a sham to recruit the Order to defend the remaining gates. Roy reluctantly agrees once he learns that Xykon has survived and is recruiting a massive army of hobgoblins to seize the remaining gates. As a condition for his agreement, he has Belkar released on bail, with a magic rune on his forehead (called a "Mark of Justice") that will trigger a curse if he violates certain conditions. In addition, each member of the Order receives a boon, one of which is the repair of Roy's sword. The printed book contains strips 122–301, plus extras.

=== War and XPs ===
In Azure City, Celia and Roy begin a romantic relationship, and Celia gives Roy a talisman which will summon her when broken. The Order travels to Sunken Valley to consult an Oracle as to which Gate Xykon will target next. Roy phrases the question poorly and receives the misleading answer that, out of Girard's and Kraagor's Gate, Xykon will approach Girard's first; in fact, Xykon's army embarks for Azure City.

The Order makes a brief diversion to Cliffport to confront the Linear Guild, who have kidnapped Roy's sister Julia. After Nale frames Elan for the Linear Guild's crimes, Elan escapes from prison and reunites with Haley with the help of a dashing swordsman named Julio Scoundrel. Haley recovers her speech and confesses her love for Elan, who reciprocates.

The Order returns to Azure City to ask Lord Shojo for further directions. Miko, who does not know about the plan to find the Gates but does know about Xykon's army, overhears the conversation and jumps to the conclusion that both are in league with Xykon. She strikes her master down, and is immediately stripped of her paladin status by her gods and imprisoned.

Xykon's hobgoblins attack the city the next day. The Order helps Shojo's heir, Hinjo, hold the city walls. Xykon attempts to circumvent the defenders, but Roy jumps onto the zombified dragon that Xykon is riding, and the two duel once more. Xykon overpowers Roy and sends him falling to his death. Xykon and Redcloak attempt to activate Soon's Gate, which is hidden within a gem embedded in the royal throne, but Miko, having escaped from prison, destroys it to prevent this. In the ensuing explosion, Miko is killed, and Xykon and Redcloak escape. The city falls to the hobgoblins. Haley and Belkar become separated from the party when they go to recover Roy's corpse, while the others sail away with Hinjo and the surviving Azurites. The printed book contains strips 302–484, plus extras.

=== Don't Split the Party ===
Roy finds himself in the Afterlife with his father, who cannot rest until Xykon is gone. Roy is found worthy of entrance to paradise, but he returns to his father's side when he learns that almost four months have passed. Looking down into the mortal realm, he sees that Haley and Belkar have formed an underground resistance movement in hobgoblin-occupied Azure City. Haley accidentally breaks Roy's talisman and summons Celia, who convinces her to look for the other half of the party.

They first return to Sunken Valley in the hope that the Oracle can restore Roy to life, but he denies having any such power. In the ensuing quarrel, Belkar stabs the Oracle to death, thus triggering his Mark of Justice; he becomes ill. (The Oracle, resurrected after they leave, tells Roy's eavesdropping ghost that Belkar will die within the year.) Their travels take them to Greysky City, where Haley is betrayed by one of her old friends in the Thieves' Guild, but the Order triumphs over the Guild in the ensuing battle. Belkar's Mark of Justice is removed by a priest of Loki, and he decides to become more helpful to his teammates.

Meanwhile, Elan, Durkon, and Vaarsuvius foil a plot to assassinate Hinjo, and Vaarsuvius kills the ringleader (a nobleman named Kubota). Vaarsuvius then flies to an isolated island to search for Haley, where s/he is attacked and defeated by the mother of the black dragon whom s/he had killed during No Cure for the Paladin Blues. After the dragon threatens to kill Vaarsuvius' children, s/he contracts with the Inter-Fiend Cooperation Council to rent the souls of three evil spellcasters; in exchange each archfiend earns temporary possession of Vaarsuvius' soul. S/he then kills the black dragon and her entire lineage with an epic Familicide spell from one of the souls.

Loath to waste this increased arcane power, Vaarsuvius teleports to Azure City to defeat Xykon. Here s/he encounters a paladin named O-Chul, a prisoner of Xykon and Redcloak who has secretly befriended Xykon's Monster in the Darkness. Vaarsuvius is knocked out during the battle and loses access to the "rented" souls, but O-Chul breaks free and comes to Vaarsuvius' aid. Xykon's phylactery falls into a storm drain and is lost.

Vaarsuvius and O-Chul are accidentally teleported to Hinjo's fleet in the nick of time by the Monster in the Darkness. There, the Order regroups and Durkon resurrects Roy. The story arc ends with the Order sailing towards the next gate and Vaarsuvius apologizing to the neglected familiar Blackwing, who tells Vaarsuvius that it saw what appeared to be another world in the rift in space caused by the Snarl. The printed book contains strips 485–672, plus extras.

=== Blood Runs in the Family ===
While O-Chul and fellow paladin Lien travel north to Kraagor's gate, the Order sails to the Western Continent. Their search for Girard's Gate takes them to the Empire of Blood, where Tarquin, the Empress of Blood's chief general (and the true power behind the throne), dramatically reveals himself to be Elan's father. Tarquin gives the Order a tip that Girard's relative Orrin Draketooth can be found in Windy Canyon. However, Tarquin and the Linear Guild join forces and plot to seize the gate for themselves.

Meanwhile, in Azure City, Redcloak's troops recover Xykon's phylactery and destroy the resistance's base. Redcloak, who is plotting against Xykon, gives him a false phylactery and keeps the real one for himself; Xykon hides the fake in a secret fortress in the Astral Plane.

The Order discovers a magically cloaked pyramid in Windy Canyon, but once inside finds the entire Draketooth clan dead — an unexpected result of Vaarsuvius's Familicide spell, which causes them to flee into the pyramid in horror. The Linear Guild arrives shortly after in hot pursuit. Belkar, Durkon, and Tarquin become separated from their respective groups in the ensuing battle. Belkar and Durkon encounter Tarquin's cleric Malack, who kills Durkon, turning him into a vampire thrall. Belkar reunites with the Order and they continue deeper into the pyramid, overcoming various traps and illusions along the way.

When they discover the gate, Roy decides to destroy it, and consequently the entire pyramid, rather than risk it falling into the hands of Evil. Vaarsuvius, in an adjacent corridor, tries to tell him not to, but is temporarily dragged into hell as one of the IFCC collects on their debt. Again the Order sees what appears to be another world in the rift.

With Tarquin gone, Nale takes the opportunity to kill Malack, freeing Durkon who rejoins the Order. Tarquin kills Nale for disobedience upon returning and sends a vast army to attack the Order. With the help of Julio Scoundrel swooping in at the last moment, the Order is triumphant. Tarquin is left in the middle of the desert as the Order flies away on Julio's airship towards the last Gate.

The final strip reveals that the Northern death goddess Hel has placed a spirit in the vampirized body of Durkon, and plans for the spirit to bring ruin to the Dwarven lands as the real Durkon helplessly struggles trapped in his own body. The printed book contains strips 673–946, plus extras.

=== Utterly Dwarfed ===
Julio's airship gets damaged in a storm, and the Order stop in the steampunk-inspired gnome town of Tinkertown to repair it. Haley deals with her old enemies, while Roy and Durkon search for a cleric who can cure Durkon's vampirism. The vampire spirit possessing Durkon's body forces Durkon to show him his memories so as to fool the rest of the Order into thinking he is the same person. They encounter Veldrina and Wrecan, who are traveling to the Godsmoot, an interfaith council of clerics. The Order flies the pair to the Godsmoot with the goal of restoring Durkon to life.

At the Godsmoot, they discover that due to the threat of the Snarl, the gods are casting votes (conveyed through their mortal representatives) on whether to destroy the world and start over. Vampire Durkon, revealed to be the High Priest of Hel, votes in favor of the destruction, causing a tie. Roy and Vampire Durkon fight to a standstill; the demigods' priests vote and also end up in a tie – with the priest of Dvalin needing to consult with the Dwarven Council before he can cast a vote.

Vampire Durkon is now revealed to have turned a number of other people into vampires behind closed doors before the vote; he and most of them teleport out to the dwarven lands (leaving one as a replacement High Priest) to dominate the Council so they will vote in Hel's favor. The Order regroups and flies off to the dwarven city of Firmament, their journey plagued by frost-giant attacks and mutiny.

O-Chul and Lien reach the North Pole. There, they watch Xykon's party attempt to find Kraagor's Gate, which is hidden behind one of hundreds of dungeon doors leading from a ravine. The Monster in the Darkness marks the doors they have already tried with paint, but when the others' backs are turned also marks other doors in order to stymie their plans.

In Firmament the Order gain allies (among them Hilgya Firehelm, accompanied by her and Durkon's infant son Kudzu) and fight newly vampirized dwarves. The vampires manage to hypnotize most of the Order, ruining their plans and leaving all of them unconscious. However, in the meantime Durkon tricks Vampire Durkon into absorbing the rest of his memories all at once, effectively turning him into a copy of Durkon for long enough to get their body destroyed by Belkar.

Durkon's soul ascends to the afterlife along with that of another dwarf cleric (Minrah Shaleshoe). They encounter Thor, who reveals that their world is the latest of countless many created by the gods as temporary prisons for the Snarl. Having been created by four pantheons, the Snarl is stronger than anything created by only three, and always destroys its prison eventually. However, Thor reveals that a fourth pantheon has arisen in this world consisting (so far) only of the goblins' god The Dark One. He tasks Durkon with recruiting Redcloak, the Dark One's high priest, to help stop the Snarl for good.

Hilgya resurrects Durkon. The Order and an army of dwarves led by Minrah (who has also been resurrected) storm the Dwarven Council chambers and defeat the vampires. Using a magical hammer gifted him by Thor, Durkon damages the Council table sufficiently to get the vote delayed indefinitely. The Order embarks for Kraagor's Gate, with Minrah joining them. Meanwhile, O-Chul and Lien are kidnapped and drugged by invisible attackers.

The printed book contains strips 947–1189, plus extras.

=== Book 7 ===
The Order reaches the North Pole, where they investigate the paladins' disappearance. Durkon and Minrah abscond, unsuccesflly trying to win over Redcloak to Thor's cause. They are routed by Team Evil and take refuge in the Tomb with the rest of the Order.

O-Chul and Lien wake to find themselves captured by elderly Serini Toormuck. She fears that they and the Order may destroy the last Gate and, with it the world, rather than let Xykon win. Serini proceeds to ambush the Order with the aid of her adopted child, a trusting beholder named Sunny. The Order prevails and restrains her, releasing the paladins. Eventually they manage to convince her to ally with them and the paladins. Together they enter the "Final Dungeon", killing a red dragon on their way to the Gate.

Meanwhile, Team Evil makes haste to find the Gate, bypassing most of the guardian monsters. In the Lower Planes the IFCC makes their move, turning Nale's soul into a devil and sending him to destroy Kraagor's Gate. He, Sabine and resurrected Thog infiltrate the "Final Dungeon" and fight the Order again.

== Commentary on role-playing games ==
Much of the humor of The Order of the Stick is based on roleplaying games (particularly the Dungeons and Dragons 3rd Edition ruleset), with characters freely discussing game mechanics, such as experience points, skill sets, and random encounters. The characters know very well that they live in a world controlled by the rules of roleplaying games, but attempt to function normally within it, often with nonsensical results. Characters have been shown browsing through rulebooks for the D&D game to select a certain monster for use or to learn about a new class. Common techniques of players and Dungeon Masters are spoofed, such as the weather of the campaign world changing to herald a dramatic encounter, or a player who does not bother to complete the details of his character's backstory. Burlew's satirical humor addresses many of the clichés of the fantasy genre as a whole, often by twisting them in new and different ways.

Burlew occasionally creates characters and situations specifically to highlight what he considers common problems and deficits among roleplayers. The controversial paladin Miko Miyazaki is one such character; Burlew has said that she represents the division among players of the game over whether or not one character should be allowed to "police" the remainder of an adventuring party. He has referred to her as being "one of the WORST ways to play a paladin." Another example is the creation myth of the OOTS world, which shows a group of gods bickering over how to create the world—accidentally creating the world-devouring Snarl through their refusal to compromise. In the commentary for No Cure for the Paladin Blues, Burlew likens this story to the squabbles that might arise in a group of roleplayers, which threaten to destroy the fun that they have created together.

The comic occasionally directly comments on current events in the roleplaying game industry by the inclusion of characters that represent the participants. In the last three comics to appear in Dragon, the OOTS members encounter a green dragon that serves as a self-identified allegorical figure for the magazine itself. The dragon recounts the magazine's long history, complete with representations of its various publishers, including a wizard of the coast and Mr. Potato Head (the signature toy of Wizards of the Coast's corporate parent, Hasbro). In the final issue, the dragon escapes the wizard of the coast's lawyers by flying through a room featuring characters from many of the comics that have appeared in Dragon over the years, such as Wormy, Knights of the Dinner Table, and What's New with Phil & Dixie, before the OOTS characters directly thank the dragon for its long years of service. This theme was employed again when a character in the online strip voiced Burlew's eulogy to D&D co-creator Gary Gygax immediately after his death was announced. The memorial comic was widely cited among websites covering Gygax's death. Burlew created a similar tribute strip for D&D co-creator Dave Arneson after his death.

== Reaction ==
Due to its reflection of the comical excesses of gaming culture, The Order of the Stick has been hailed as "must reading" for those who play roleplaying games and "the roleplaying comic to beat". Critics sometimes cite the insular nature of in-jokes regarding the D&D rules that crop up regularly (especially in the early part of the comic's run) as a barrier to new readers, noting that without a working knowledge of fantasy roleplaying games, much of the humor may fall flat. However, the comic is just as often seen as being accessible to casual readers without such gaming knowledge due to the strength of the main cast's portrayals and abundance of character-based humor. The comic has been praised for its "shrewd writing" and "increasingly intricate and cleverly scripted adventures" as well as its execution. One webcomic critic has called it "one of the few very simplistically drawn comics that can pull [off] an extensive storyline." Particular praise has been given to the scenes depicting the siege of Azure City, which has been called "a war worthy of Peter Jackson."

The comic's stick figure art has received mixed reviews. Some critics praise its "surprisingly expressive art", with PvP cartoonist Scott Kurtz adding that the comic would not be as funny or have as much heart if the characters were drawn in any other style. Time magazine and Black Gate praised the comic characters for their expressiveness, even though they are drawn as stick figures. Lev Grossman of Time said that Burlew sometimes "imbues them with a weird epic majesty". Others denounce its simple geometric characters as "merely functional" or (as fellow webcomic creator Jackie Lesnick put it) only "good for someone who isn't really an artist". Burlew has defended his art style several times in public statements, stating he has no lack of proficiency at drawing, but intentionally developed a clean and simple style to help the reader focus on the humor. He has pointed out that the primary goal of comic art is to communicate the actions of the characters, which his style does as well as any other. Burlew has addressed similar criticisms within the comic itself several times, either by contrasting his usual art with more realistic drawings or by simply putting self-deprecating dialogue regarding his style into the mouths of characters.

Surveys of webcomic site traffic held since May 2007 have consistently placed The Order of the Stick as one of the 10 most widely read webcomics in existence. Burlew has estimated that he has about 650,000 dedicated readers and up to one million additional casual readers. Every day, thousands of the comic's readers participate in the comic's official forums, which feature discussion of The Order of the Stick and roleplaying games in general. Many participants are noted for adopting avatars drawn in emulation of Burlew's stick figure style, with some fans even creating additional "fancomics" in that style on the site's message board or their own sites.

=== Awards and recognition ===
The Order of the Stick received two nominations for Britain's 2008 Eagle Awards, for Favourite Web-Based Comic and Favourite Original Graphic Novel (for Start of Darkness). OOTS won the former category, but lost the latter one to Alan Moore's The League of Extraordinary Gentlemen: Black Dossier. In announcing the results on his site, Burlew stated he was pleased that he didn't win the Favourite Original Graphic Novel category, saying, "I don't think I want to live in a world where a parody stick figure comic beats one of the comic industry's top writers." No Cure for the Paladin Blues, the comic's second print compilation, won a 2007 Gold ENnie award. OOTS has been nominated for ten Web Cartoonists' Choice Awards, of which it has won five. It was named Best Long Form Comic in 2008, Best Gaming Comic and Best Long Form Comic in 2007, and Best Fantasy Comic in 2006, and tied for Best Fantasy Comic in 2005.

The Museum of Comic and Cartoon Art in New York City included The Order of the Stick #443 in its first webcomic-only exhibit, Infinite Canvas: The Art of Webcomics.

== Publications ==
The cover of On The Origin of PCs, the first of two OOTS prequel books

The Order of the Stick books are published by Giant in the Playground Games, a small press publishing company formed by OOTS creator Rich Burlew. The books are widely distributed to online and brick-and-mortar retailers in the hobby game market as well as to comic book direct retailers. Each book features an introduction by the author as well as a preface written in the voice of one of the characters from the strip. The compilation books feature a number of pages of "bonus material"—primarily additional strips inserted into various points in the story. The bonus material for Dungeon Crawlin' Fools, for example, includes a nine-page opening to the story that Burlew felt introduced the characters in a more organic way than the online comic's cast page.

On Jan. 22nd, 2012, Burlew launched a Kickstarter campaign to get The Order of the Stick: War and XPs back into print, which eventually raised enough money to reprint the whole book series. The drive was the most funded creative work in Kickstarter up to that point, getting more than twenty times the original goal for a total of $1,254,120. During the reprint drive Burlew committed, as rewards for meeting increasing funding goals, to write eight new short stories either about specific characters or in alternative non-canon settings; the characters for three of these stories were chosen by backers as part of the pledge reward.

Title	Year	ISBN	Volume	Strips	Pages	Colors
Dungeon Crawlin' Fools	2005	9780985413910	1	1–121	120	Full color
On the Origin of PCs	2005	9780985413927	0	Print-exclusive prequel	72	Black-and-white
No Cure for the Paladin Blues	2006	9780976658030	2	121a–301	244	Full color
Start of Darkness	2007	9780976658047	−1	Print-exclusive prequel	112	Black-and-white with color inserts
War And XPs	2008	9780976658054	3	302–484	288	Full color
Don't Split the Party	2009	9780976658061	4	485–672	272	Full color
Snips, Snails, and Dragon Tales	2011	9780976658078	D	Dragon content, plus print-only content	112	Mixed color and black-and-white
Blood Runs in the Family	2014	9780976658085	5	673–946	368	Full color
Good Deeds Gone Unpunished	2018	9780976658092	½	Print-exclusive spin-off	160	Black-and-white
Utterly Dwarfed	2019	9780985413965	6	947–1189	352	Full color

== Board game ==
Box cover for The Order of the Stick Adventure Game

In partnership with APE Games, Giant in the Playground released the first OOTS game, The Order of the Stick Adventure Game: The Dungeon of Dorukan. The game, which was released in September 2006, utilizes cards and a board, and has strong influences from games such as Talisman and Dungeon!, as well as the less-known "Kings & Things".

The Dungeon of Dorukan is designed for 2–6 people, aged twelve and older. Each player controls one member of the OOTS team to explore the dungeon and hunt down Xykon. The player is able to train their chosen member with a variety of shtick cards. Each character provides a different gaming experience, and the players have the ability to either aid or harm their teammates.

The game has received two expansion sets. The first one, The Shortening, released in 2011 by APE Games, included new cards and rules to reduce the duration of the game. The second 20 card mini-expansion, Sticky Shticks, was announced as a pledge reward for the 2012 "reprint drive" Kickstarter campaign. It features cards that can be stuck to characters giving them some penalties.

== Sources ==
- Burlew, Rich (February 2005). The Order of the Stick: Dungeon Crawlin' Fools. Philadelphia: Giant in the Playground. ISBN 9780985413910.
- Burlew, Rich (August 2005). The Order of the Stick: On the Origin of PCs. Philadelphia: Giant in the Playground. ISBN 9780985413927.
- Burlew, Rich (August 2006). The Order of the Stick: No Cure for the Paladin Blues. Philadelphia: Giant in the Playground. ISBN 9780976658030.
- Burlew, Rich (May 2007). The Order of the Stick: Start of Darkness. Philadelphia: Giant in the Playground. ISBN 9780976658047.
- Burlew, Rich (August 2008). The Order of the Stick: War and XPs. Philadelphia: Giant in the Playground. ISBN 9780976658054.
- Burlew, Rich (December 2009). The Order of the Stick: Don't Split the Party. Philadelphia: Giant in the Playground. ISBN 9780976658061.
- Burlew, Rich (June 2011). The Order of the Stick: Snips, Snails, and Dragon Tales. Philadelphia: Giant in the Playground. ISBN 9780976658078.
- Burlew, Rich (November 2014). The Order of the Stick: Blood Runs in the Family. Philadelphia: Giant in the Playground. ISBN 9780976658085.
- Burlew, Rich (August 2018). The Order of the Stick: Good Deeds Gone Unpunished. Philadelphia: Giant in the Playground. ISBN 9780976658092.
- Burlew, Rich (December 2019). The Order of the Stick: Utterly Dwarfed. Philadelphia: Giant in the Playground. ISBN 9780985413965.
