= American Micro Devices =

American technology company

- Industry: Electronics
- Genre: Computer diodes, integrated circuit boards
- Founded: 1961 in Minnesota
- Defunct: 1965
- Fate: Liquidated
- Headquarters: United States

American Micro Devices was an American semiconductor company based in Minneapolis, Minnesota. It was incorporated in 1961 and administratively dissolved in 1991.

== History ==
The company formed as an electronics manufacturer and designer in 1961. It was incorporated in Minnesota. Joseph C. Worth was a cofounder and became president of AMD. Other cofounders were Milton I. Liberhaber and Dearl H. Belvis, as well as Louis Bialick, Lee Sudit, and Theodore M. Stone.

In May 1962, the company opened its electronics plant in Phoenix, Arizona. Its first stockholders meeting was held in August 1962. It entered the market with its products in September 1962.

In 1962, American Micro purchased Standard Rectifier, Corp. in Santa Ana, California. Standard announced it would become an AMD division in Phoenix, where AMD had operating facilities. At the time, AMD manufactured "silicon computer diodes and integrated computer circuits."

In 1964, Sylvania Electric Products agreed to market some products for AMD.

On March 8, 1965, American Micro Devices voted through its board to "discontinue business and commence an orderly liquidatation of assets." President Ian B. Dickson said that it closed when Sylvania Electric Products "declined to order products for the first and second quarters of 1965." At the time, the firm had 3,000 stockholders, and had a contract to deliver $1.5 million worth of goods to Sylvania in 1964, and $2.5 million in 1965. Sylvania had become overstocked by 1965. Assets owned by the company were auctioned off on May 11 and 12, 1965 in Phoenix.

In 1988, the Chicago Tribune reported that "American Micro Devices, incorporated in Minnesota in 1961, was last offered on the over-the-counter market at 25 cents a share in late 1979. The following year, the company went out of existence and its stock became worthless, according to Robert D. Fisher, vice president with the New York-based R.M. Smythe & Co. stock-search firm." By 1988, the stock was reported defunct. Fisher said at the time that "we found no trace of the company and believe it ceased to exist in 1980 or before".
