= Nowhere Girl (webcomic) =

2001 webcomic by Justine Shaw

- Author: Justine Shaw
- Website: http://www.nowheregirl.com
- Current status/schedule: Retired
- Launch date: October 2001

Nowhere Girl, Chapter Two, Page 13

Nowhere Girl is an adult fiction webcomic by Justine Shaw, about a "college student who feels like an outsider in her own life, finding her place in the world and coming to terms with her sexuality". It is named after a song written by British futurist band B-Movie. Since its start in 2001, Nowhere Girl has won several awards. However, the comic has been retired in 2010.

== Development ==
Inspirations include Love and Rockets by the Hernandez brothers, and John Hughes films, especially The Breakfast Club. Additional influences include pop music singer Morrissey and music groups The Smiths (which was fronted by Morrisey) and Elastica. Although the comic is not autobiographical, issue two draws some material from the author's time spent working for an Internet start-up in Silicon Valley during the boom years, circa 1997–1999.

The comic was originally planned to be in five parts, but only two of them have been completed thus far; plans to complete the comic have been shelved by the author, according to her website.

Shaw has also contributed artwork to the Star Wars Origins website, which documents possible inspirations George Lucas drew from to create the Star Wars films.

== Reception ==
The Village Voice has described the webcomic as "a graphic novel that appeals to the clove-smoking, Nick Drake-loving art student in all of us." In 2003, Nowhere Girl received a nomination for an Eisner award in the "best new series" category, making it the first nomination of a Web comic. Shaw was nominated for "talent deserving of wider recognition". Also in 2003, Nowhere Girl was nominated for several categories in the Web Cartoonists' Choice Awards, eventually winning "Outstanding Comic", "Outstanding Website Design", "Outstanding Dramatic Comic" and "Outstanding Reality Comic". Scott McCloud stated that Nowhere Girl was important because the design of its pages worked well on the web, making the long-form webcomic more approachable.
