= Badmash.org =

- Author(s): Sandeep Sood, Nimesh Patel and Sanjay Shah
- Website: http://www.badmash.tv/
- Current status/schedule: Defunct
- Launch date: June 30, 2003
- End date: May 11, 2011

Badmash.org was a website which hosted animations, sketches and video clips, as well as a regular webcomic. A weekly email and print-media newsletters reached over a million people. The works on Badmash.org had a mix of political and social satire. The website was started by three friends, Sandeep Sood, Nimesh Patel and Sanjay Shah.

Badmash is a Hindi neologism, meaning "naughty".

Badmash.org weekly South Asian-themed animations — such as an Indian spoof of The Simpsons' opening theme, nicknamed The Singhsons — drew millions of visitors to the website. The success of Sood, Patel, and Shah helped them earn consulting work for MTV, New Line Cinema and Sony.

== Webcomic ==
The regular webcomic strip on Badmash.org features various regular characters, including Raju, one of the comic strip creators who is a Gujarati-American Hindu, his sister Beti, his traditional grandmother, his mom, his belligerent dad and his Sikh Punjabi friend who is also one of the comic strip creators. Beti also has a Desi friend named Meena. Also, there is an old Sikh taxicab driver and two culturally removed young Punjabi-American party boys named Motu and Chotu and Raju's dark skinned friend named Vivek.

The comic strip deals with racial issues involving Indian Americans in the United States. Some strips deal with South Asians being accused of terrorism. Others involve White America's misconception and intolerance about India, Hinduism, and Indian Americans which usually are confrontational. The misconceptions dealt with include negative stereotypes created by the Simpsons and Indiana Jones and the Temple of Doom. A few have Raju and Beti's interracial relationships with whites of the opposite sex. Some strips involve Indian social dances and Indian social pressures to only marry other Indians. It deals with some larger political issues. It comments on Bobby Jindal, Sonia Gandhi, President Bush, and Mahatma Gandhi.

== Current status ==
The website moved to the domain name "badmash.tv" before becoming inactive in 2011.
