= El Listo =

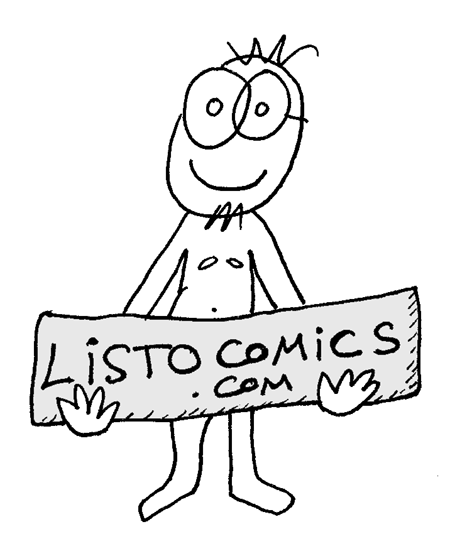
- El Listo drawn in 2011

Publication information
- First appearance: 2003
- Created by: Xavier Àgueda

El Listo (literally The Clever One) is a webcomic character conceptualized by Xavier Àgueda in 2003. Àgueda initially tried to syndicate the strips about his 30-year old unemployed engineer in magazines, but after getting no response, he decided to start his own website and published his work there. Àgueda uses El Listo to comment on a large variety of topics, such as literature, film, science, politics, and food. Early artwork on the webcomic was provided by Octavi Navarro.

Àgueda has presented his webcomic in multiple comic exhibitions since its inception, and he has become a recurring face in the Spanish webcomic scene.

== Xavier Àgueda ==
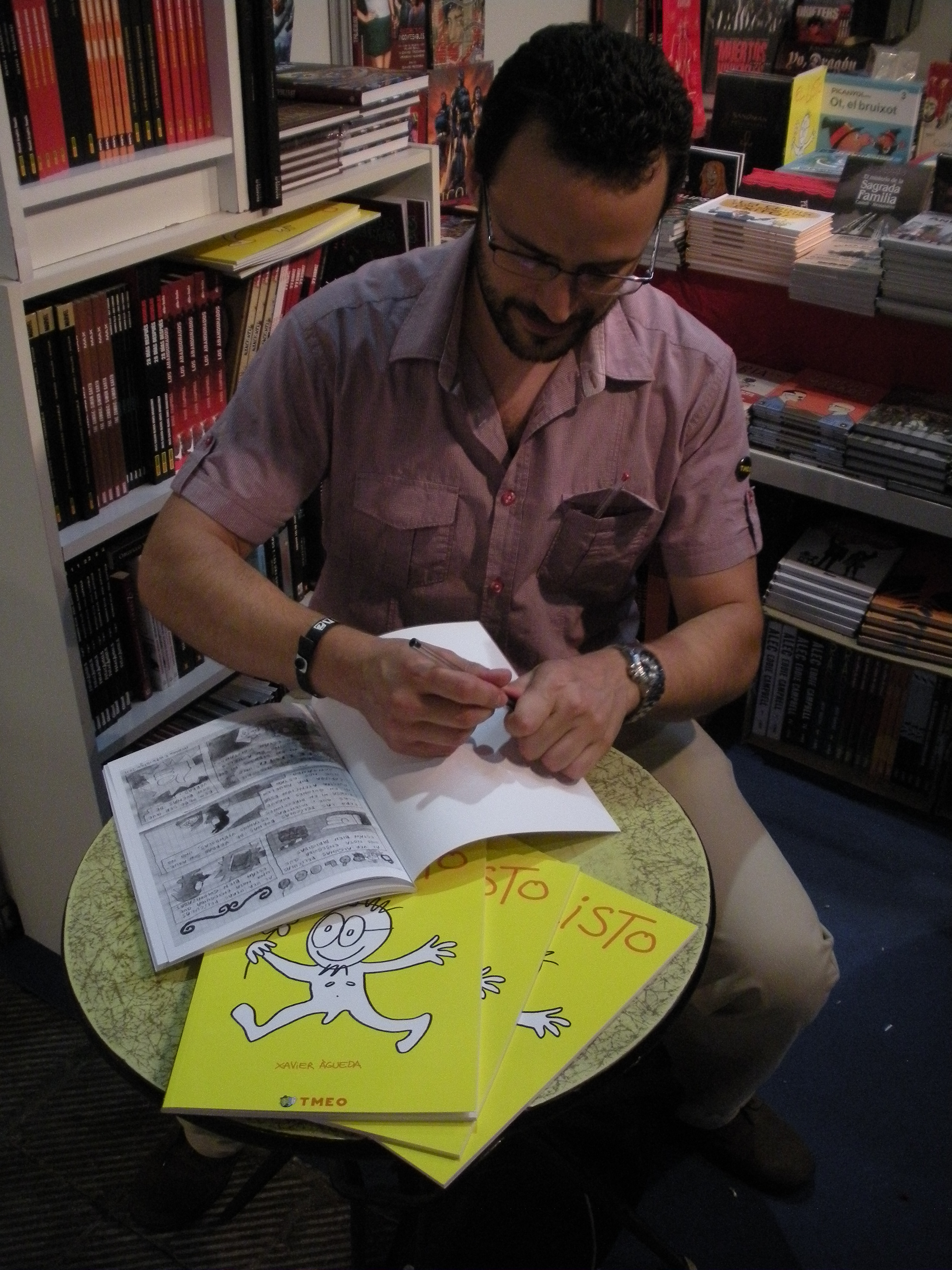
Xavier Àgueda in 2011

Xavier Àgueda was born in 1979 in Barcelona. Àgueda is an engineer and high school teacher, creating cartoons in his spare time. Besides creating El Listo, Àgueda has written a short story in L'estiu d'Ulises i altres contes as well as the prologues of Comics 2.0: Antología del Webcómic, Zombess, Crónicas PSN 3, and Spooky Volumen 2. Moreover, Àgueda is involved with various webcomic blogs, collaborates with the Comic Book Guide, and writes textbooks for Editorial Casals. Àgueda often uses his illustrations in the classes he teaches in technology and natural science.

Àgueda described his experiences as a webcomic author in his 2015 autobiography Una Amante Complacient.

== Character ==
The character El Listo is a 30-year old, unemployed engineer, who is drawn with a monkey-like appearance. The character reads books, watches films, and studies up on various topics, to the point where he is able to give his opinion on a large variation of subjects. Àgueda admits that the character resembles him to some degree, but has consistently denied that El Listo is based on himself or that his strips are autobiographical. In an interview, Àgueda explained that "[El Listo] studied the same things as I did, he is about my age and has my hobbies, but he is a caricature. He has things from me, from my friends, and from people I know." El Listo spends his time with the supporting characters El Gordo, El Cachas, Tito, and Borja, which are all caricatures of early 21st century youth archetypes.

== Development ==
Àgueda thought up the character of El Listo in 2003, and quickly drew up four pages with him. However, when he gained no responses from the magazines he contacted about it, Àgueda decided to benefit from the still fairly untapped potential of the World Wide Web and put his work online. When Àgueda first uploaded his cartoons, he didn't know what webcomics were and social media services had yet to come into prominence. Inspired by the WordPress template ComicPress, which was designed to be used by cartoonists, Àgueda used Dreamweaver to build a website for himself.

El Listo is sometimes published on the 20 minutos website. Àgueda has exhibited his cartoons at Especula en Acción (Antequera, 2006), Humor Gráfico por la Libertad de Prensa (Madrid, 2008), Diez Años Después del Vertido de Aznalcóllar (Sevilla, 2008), Salón del Humor Erótico de Cuba (Santa Clara, 2008), Hartos de Arte (Vitoria-Gasteiz, 2009), Maldita la gracia (Madrid, 2010), and Escolta Espanya! ep, que hi ha algú? (Barcelona, 2011). The 42nd compilation album of TMEO magazine, published in 2011, was dedicated to El Listo, with a prologue by Mauro Entrialgo.

== Publications ==
- 2011 El Listo. TMEO Ezten Kultur Taldea.
- 2013 Una amante complaciente.
- 2015 Oxitocinas. TMEO Ezten Kultur Taldea.
- 2017 Liguepedia. Fandogamia.
- 2019 Cardio. Underbrain Books.
