= AMD Academy of Fashion and Design =

Coordinates: 53°34′01″N 10°00′01″E

The AMD Akademie Mode & Design is the design department of the private Fresenius University of Applied Sciences. With locations in Hamburg, Düsseldorf, Wiesbaden (start 2019), Munich and Berlin, AMD is thus part of one of the largest private universities of applied sciences in Germany and is based in Idstein together with the Fresenius University of Applied Sciences. Accredited study programs, training and further education programmes in the fields of design, fashion, communication and industry-specific management are part of its educational offer.

== Educational offer ==
Within the AMD Fashion School AMD and the design department of the Fresenius University of Applied Sciences offer the bachelor programs Fashion Design (B.A.), Fashion and Design Management (B.A.) and Fashion Journalism and Communication (B.A.). Within the AMD Design School the bachelor programs Spatial Design (B.A.), Product Design (B.A.). Brand and Communication Design (B.A.) and Design and Innovation Management (B.A.) are offered. In addition, the Master's programmes Fashion and Product Management (M.A.), Fashion and Retail Management (M.A.) and Sustainability in Fashion and Creative Industries (M.A.) are offered. The training course Fashion Journalism / Media Communication with the optional bachelor's degree (Hons) Fashion Management and Communication expands the academy program. The further education programs styling, head designers as well as fashion photography round off the educational offer of the academy.

== Partner universities ==
AMD cooperates with international partner universities. In addition, AMD recruits international teachers from London, Milan and Paris for workshops and seminars. International partner universities are Berkeley College (New York City, USA), Vancouver Island University (Nanaimo, Canada), London College of Fashion (London, Great Britain), European College of Business and Management (London, Great Britain), Kingston University (London, Great Britain), Nuova Accademia Di Belle Arti (Milan, Italy), Beijing Normal University (Zhuhai, China), Hongik University (Seoul, Korea), Universiteit Antwerpen (Antwerp, Belgium), Hogeschool Gent, School of Arts (Gent, Belgium) and New Design University (St. Pölten, Austria).
