= A Modest Destiny =

Webcomic by Sean Howard

- Author: Sean Howard
- Website: squidi.net
- Current status/schedule: No longer updating
- Launch date: January 2003
- Genre: Fantasy

A Modest Destiny is a pixel art webcomic created by Sean Howard. The comic started in January 2003.

== History ==
=== Creation ===
A Modest Destiny was created by Sean Howard. In an interview, Howard said that his background was in programming. He said that he became interested in comics when a website he followed went down for a server upgrade and the admin posted a list of things people could do instead, one of which was a link to Sluggy Freelance. Some time later, he was seeking work and looking for a way to be creative and started drawing comics. Howard said that his use of pixel art was based on needing art for video games he was producing. Howard felt the term "sprite comic" was inappropriate for his work as his art was original rather than copied out of a video game, and said he could not agree with doing so and that "it has led to some of the worst webcomics in existence."

=== Publication ===
In a January 2004 interview, Howard said that he wanted A Modest Destiny to run for only three years, so that it would never get tired and repeat itself.

In July 2005, with the final storyline halfway through, Howard announced that he was ceasing to make webcomics.

=== Dispute with Penny Arcade ===
In late 2003, Howard wrote to the creators of Penny Arcade over the use of his art by users of the Penny Arcade forum. Howard's letter said that he had already "shut down six web comics that were using his art". Mike Krahulik posted about the letter and dispute on the Penny Arcade website, including a link to A Modest Destiny; the traffic overload from this temporarily caused a shutdown of Howard's site.

== Plot ==
A Modest Destiny consists of four chapters, also called seasons or arcs – "Maxim Saves the World", "The Dreaded Vampire Lord Fluffy", "The War of Fate", and "Prophecies of the Demon King" – and one short story entitled "Sibling Rivalry". The comic is set in a fantasy world.

The first arc, "Maxim Saves The World", follows the adventures of the titular character, Maxim, and is narrated through a series of flashbacks. The second arc, "The Dreaded Vampire Lord Fluffy", is roughly half the length of the first and focusses on a single story rather than several smaller ones. Set in the same universe as the first chapter, it follows a vampire necromancer named Fluffy who had been tamed by society. The story also features a number of lesser-used characters from the first storyline and depicts the events leading up to a war between the humans and the undead. The third arc, "The War Of Fate", is set five years after the end of "Lord Fluffy" in a world all but destroyed by war against the undead. An undead army, led by the mysterious Black Knight, has taken over the majority of the country, with only a small group of humans left to oppose him. These humans, led by Maxim and his friends, defend a small city called Last Hope. The final arc of A Modest Destiny was titled "Prophecies of the Demon King".

== Reception ==
In his 2004 book, How to Draw and Sell Digital Cartoons, Leo Hartas used A Modest Destiny as an illustration of how reusing artwork can be an effective way to save time when creating a comic.
