= Loxie & Zoot =

Webcomic

- Author(s): Grace Crowley
- Website: http://loxieandzoot.comicgenesis.com/
- Current status/schedule: Completed
- Launch date: 2000
- End date: 26 April 2006
- Genre(s): Comedy
- Followed by: The Bare Pit

Loxie & Zoot is a webcomic by Australian artist Grace Crowley (going by "Stephen Crowley" at the time) that ran from 2000 to 2006. The webcomic, which was originally intended for a niche audience of naturists, follows the inhabitants of a fictional nudist resort. Loxie & Zoot became somewhat notorious for the "pleasant" and realistic manner in which it presents its subject matter.

== Synopsis ==
Loxie & Zoot is set in the fictional Koala Bay Bares Naturist Resort, a nudist resort where its varied cast of characters, including its title characters Loxie and Zoot, reside. During the several storylines of Loxie & Zoot, the inhabitants of the resort have to deal with a jewel thief, supernatural elements, and the villain Tex Tyler, who desires to shut the resort down. The world of Loxie & Zoot is presented in a very "pleasant" manner, with no cynicism or malice involved.

== Development ==
Grace Crowley has been drawing comics since she was a child, and shortly after completing university, she found herself working for a publisher that specializes in educational comics, presenting realistic stories about specific heavy issues. Crowley stated that Loxie & Zoot "kind of flowed out of that to a degree," noting that she was also reading many alternative, indie, and underground comics at the time. Crowley had enjoyed several visits to nude beaches during university, and figured a story about nudism could tap into a niche market. Crowley got one half-page cartoon of Loxie & Zoot published in an Australian nudist magazine in 1997, and in 1998, she started experimenting with publishing her story as a webcomic. However, because she was making the story up as she was going and was more focused on her day job, Crowley only managed to post nine pages before Loxie & Zoot went on an extended hiatus. Crowley attempted again in 2000, and managed to post the webcomic's first storyarc of 120 pages. On advice from Reinder Dijkhuis, Crowley transferred her webcomic to Keenspace in 2003, which prompted her to think more broadly of Loxie & Zoot's target audience.

In an interview with The Webcomics Examiner, Crowley stated that she "wanted to do a comic that went totally against the convention of comics of nudists that presented them all as young hour-glass figured women and chesty men." Furthermore, Crowley wanted to subvert the practice of strategically drawing nude characters from the waist up or partially obscured in order to cover genitals, playing against the taboos and stereotypes of nudity and sexuality.

Crowley went on to create the superhero webcomic Magellan for the platform Graphic Smash. Crowley also created some webcomics for Webcomics Nation. After the conclusion of Loxie & Zoot, Crowley began the spin-off webcomic The Bare Pit.

== Legacy ==
In 2006, Crowley won a Ledger Award in the category for "Talent Deserving Wider Recognition". Despite its benign nature, Loxie & Zoot gained some notoriety among the webcomic community of its time due to its ubiquitous nudity.

== Collected Editions ==
- Crowley, Stephen (2002). The Koala Bares. Toons au Naturel. ISBN 0958129908.
