= Girly =

Webcomic by Jaqueline Lesnick

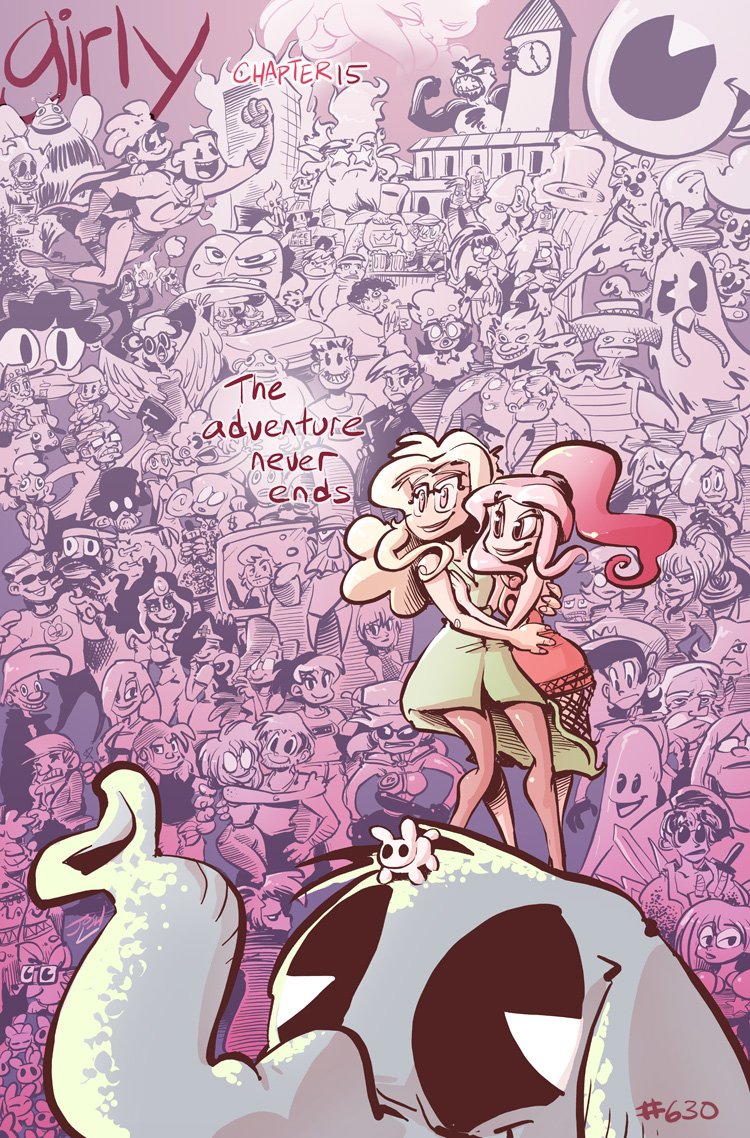
- Author: Jaqueline Lesnick
- Website: http://www.jaqqqln.com/girly
- Current status/schedule: Completed
- Launch date: April 2003
- End date: September 16, 2010
- Genre: Romantic comedy

Girly is a webcomic created by Jaqueline Lesnick which follows the romantic relationship between two girls named Otra and Winter, as well as other citizens of the city of Cute-Town. It ran from 2003 until 2010. The author describes their work as "a comic that went everywhere and did everything, for better or worse. But all in all it is a comic about 2 gals who love each other very much dawwww. Girly is a comic that helped sexually awaken a generation of readers, as well as (eventually) myself."

== Plot summary ==
The webcomic is a sequel to Lesnick's previous work, CuteWendy. The initial plotline describes Winter making Otra her sidekick, with the two then becoming friends and later lovers. The first chapter also describes the downfall of the character El Chubacabre, who reviewer Kate Ditzler said "is described as a lover, pleasurer, eater, and penetrater of women."

== History ==
Girly launched in April 2003. It was an offshoot / sequel to Lesnick's previous work CuteWendy, and was originally intended to run for no more than 50 strips. However, Lesnick became enamored with the characters.

Girly was hosted on Keenspot, but in November 2004, Girly moved to its own server. In October 2005, Girly became a part of the Dayfree Press collective of webcomics, which included strips such as Dinosaur Comics and Questionable Content.

in August 2006, Lesnick announced that a sales and donation drive had raised $5,000 and while she could not live solely from Girly, it meant she "could officially concentrate on comics for the rest of the year and not worry too much about making ends meet."

Girly ended in September 2010, after 764 strips.

=== Printing and collections ===
In July 2006, the first print collection of Girly was published by Radio Comix, in black and white on newsprint. On May 2, 2007, volume 2 became available. Lesnick also ran a successful Kickstarter to print a single collection of all of Girly in four books in one slipcover. There have also been book printings of the prequel comic, CuteWendy.

- Girly Volume 1 ISBN 0-9786385-0-6
- Girly Volume 2 ISBN 0-9791417-1-0
- Girly: The Complete Collection ISBN 0-9791417-2-9

In 2017, Girly was included in the first set of 39 webcomics archived by the Library of Congress.

The original website for Girly is no longer available, the comics was hosted on Lesnick's new website, SuperHappyJackie. However this website is also no longer available.

On November 30, 2021, an edited version of Girly was made available for download on itch.io by Lesnick in comic book archive format.

== Style ==
Girly's style is line-based and monochrome, using a vertical format. The original style of line drawing is akin to a manga-style but with more abstractions, giving it a sketched, freehand sort of look. The line art has evolved a great deal as time has passed, and no longer bears a great resemblance to most manga, however; recent works are somewhat reminiscent of some of John Kricfalusi's work. The art of the strip has shown a steady trend away from thin, pencil-like lines towards a much more variable, ink-brush look.

After a short hiatus, on August 4, 2007, in Girly #504, the art of the strip transitioned to a much more prominent use of color.

Along with absurdity, playing with stereotypes and frequent pop culture references, Girly has a strong vein of sexual humor.

In one strip showing Cute-Town's skyline, Lesnick comments that it "[took] the skyline of Dallas [Texas], add[ing] smiley faces and kittens". However, the interior of Cute-Town is said by the author to resemble Austin, Texas.

Writing at Fleen, webcomics commentator Gary Tyrrell described Girly as a comic which "quickly became a plot-heavy, continuity-driven strip".

== Main characters ==
Girly revolves around the main characters Otra and Winter (and often the cat as well). Occasionally the story will move to a small sub-story centered around one of the secondary characters but will eventually be tied back into one of the main characters again.

- Otra - Otra is the main character of Girly. She is 26 years old and is currently self-employed as a freelance fashion designer for the company Guapa. Not much is known about Otra (her name was not fully revealed until well into the comic) except that she has not had too hard of a life; she's just constantly disappointed/sad about mostly everything. Her main hobby is roaming through the city and observing life. Before she met Winter, she would deal with the annoying people in her life by cramming them into or tying them to small rockets and launching them into space. Winter's sudden appearance in her life has changed her a little day by day. Otra first appeared in strip 1. Her name is Spanish for "other one" - a reference to CuteWendy's sidekick, known only as the Other Girl.
- Winter - Winter is Otra's girlfriend. She is 19 years old, has no job or home and has declared Otra to be her sidekick early in the comic. She has since looked out for Otra devotedly, helping her with work and even occasionally saving her life as well. Not much is known about Winter except that she is the daughter of CuteWendy and her sidekick Other Girl from Girly's predecessor CuteWendy (as revealed early on). She's free-spirited, with an attitude that's both serious and yet silly. First appeared in strip 1.
- Marshmallow Kitty - A cat that was originally homeless and wandered the downtown area living off scraps and donations of food. After meeting Winter and Otra, it took a liking to them and followed Otra home. It soon became Otra's cat. Its early appearances made it appear slightly perverted, but that has since stopped. The cat is too pudgy to roll itself over when it's on its back, and is totally indestructible. Recently it has given birth to several kittens, much to Winter and Otra's distress, and is now officially designated as female. In strip 504 it was shown that Marshmallow Kitty was part of a scientific project to create the world's greatest cat, however this experiment resulted in the destruction of the laboratory along with everyone inside of it excluding Marshmallow Kitty. First appeared in strip 36.

== Reception ==
A writer for Sequential Tart, talking about Lesnick's work in general as of 2004, described her as "ha[ving] a thing for shiny, slippery bodies" and "tend[ing] to have a wacky sense of humor". They continued: "Combine these elements, and you get some of the most entertaining, ridiculous, and sexiest comics on the Internet."

Also in 2004, Wednesday White wrote for Comix Talk that "at the heart, Girly is a gentle story that doesn't want you to know that it's a gentle story. It's lovingly crafted, occasionally poignant, and just a little bit removed from itself. It's also young, bearing the illusion of greater length by dint of loose sequelhood, and still getting a feel for itself. When it's done kicking chin-heavy law enforcement into reader space to avoid dealing with itself, it'll be fantastic. Right now, it's engaging and sweet; that, in and of itself, is no mean feat."

Writing for Websnark, Eric Burns-White said in 2006 that Lesnick was "one of those webcartoonists all the other webcartoonists read" and said that she "has had tremendous influence over the form [of webcomics]. [Her] development of Slipshine rewrote the book on NC-17 webcomics." Burns-White called Girly "Lesnick's finest work to date, and a strip that has tremendous critical acclaim", said that Girly was "a strip that works like jazz music" where "the absurdity carries humor with it", and said that Lesnick knew how to intelligently write about stupid people. In a 2006 article for Fleen, Kate Ditzler said that Girly made her uneasy and angry, arguing that the comic strip used sexual harassment as a joke in some panels.

Girly was nominated for a Web Cartoonists' Choice Award in 2005 for "Outstanding Layout".

== Author ==
Girly was created by Jackie Lesnick. She is also the creator of the comics Cutewendy, and Wendy, and has been the editor and main artist of Slipshine, a subscription site featuring pornographic comics by over a dozen artists. According to her website, she was born in 1977 and is a trans woman; Lesnick wrote Girly under her birth name and changed her name to Jackie some time later.
