= American Association for Physician Leadership =

The American Association for Physician Leadership is an educational organization focused on physicians who hold leadership and management positions. Its central offices are located in Tampa, Florida. Peter B. Angood is the chief executive officer of the 11,000-member organization.

== History ==
The organization was founded in 1975 as the American Academy of Medical Directors in Alexandria, Virginia. The primary focus is encouraging physicians to assume more active roles in the leadership and management of organizations in the health care industry and helping physicians acquire leadership and management skills. In 1980, the name was changed to the American College of Physician Executives. In 1982, the academy moved its headquarters to Tampa. In 2014 the organization rebranded and obtained its current name with the stated goal of broadening the scope of programs, products, and services. The association states that it strives to support the physician workforce across the entire career span, from medical students to those in later career stages. This also includes physicians in clinical roles, nonclinical administrative roles and those on nontraditional physician career paths.

== Physician Leadership Journal ==
The Physician Leadership Journal (PLJ), until April 2022 known as the Physician Executive Journal (PEJ), is the journal of the society, with member-submitted articles being critically appraised by the editorial board.
