= Rich Burlew =

American author and game designer

- Born: Richard Burlew; September 1, 1974 (age 52)
- Areas: Writer, illustrator
- Pseudonym: The Giant or Giant in the Playground
- Notable works: The Order of the Stick
- Awards: Eagle Award, Gold ENnie, Five WCCA awards

Rich Burlew (born September 1, 1974) is an American author, game designer, and graphic designer. He is best known for The Order of the Stick webcomic, for which he was ranked fifth on ComixTalk's list of the Top 25 People in Webcomics for 2007. He has also written several works for Wizards of the Coast's role-playing game Dungeons & Dragons. He owns and operates a small press publishing company, Giant in the Playground, which he formed to publish his comic work.

== Early life and education ==
Burlew developed the basic elements of his stick figure art style at the age of twelve while drawing a comic called Mr. Demon for his lunchroom friends. Burlew first began playing Dungeons & Dragons in high school. He frequently assumed the role of the Game Master, a role he has likened to writing a webcomic, but his interest in the hobby lapsed until 2000 when Wizards of the Coast released the third edition ruleset for the game. Upon running his first adventure with the new rules, Burlew found that he needed several identical miniatures to represent a group of bandits. Instead of purchasing lead miniatures, he used graphic design software to draw simple stick figure cutouts in the style he had developed as a youth. He continued to use stick figure monsters for years in his D&D sessions.

Burlew attended Pratt Institute in Brooklyn, New York, where he earned a degree in illustration. He has noted that, "everything [I] learned about color use or panel composition... [I] picked up at Pratt." After leaving college, Burlew worked for several years as a professional graphic designer in New York, primarily working on elementary school textbook designs and layouts.

== Career ==
=== Career beginnings ===
In 2002, Wizards of the Coast announced a contest to find a new campaign setting for their D&D game, dubbed the Fantasy Setting Search. From a field of over eleven thousand gamers who sent in one-page descriptions of their worlds, one of Burlew's four entries was chosen as a finalist. He was asked by Wizards of the Coast to produce a 100-page setting bible for his world to compete against two other designers. The contest was won by Keith Baker's Eberron setting, with Burlew and P. Nathan Toomey as the other two finalists. Although he did not win the contest, the experience encouraged Burlew to pursue a career in game design. As his entry in the competition remains the unpublished property of Wizards of the Coast, Burlew is prohibited from discussing it by a non-disclosure agreement. However, he was offered additional writing work from Wizards of the Coast the following year in which he contributed monsters such as the "battle titan" and the "shade steel golem" to the Monster Manual III rulebook.

Burlew was able to take advantage of the attention and popularity he got from the Setting Search contest by launching his "Giant in the Playground" website and the comic The Order of the Stick. In June 2003, Burlew launched the website GiantITP.com in hopes of "turning [his] paltry name recognition into something resembling a job." He dubbed his new site, Giant in the Playground, after his screen name on the Wizards.com forums in order to capitalize on his reputation as a knowledgeable gamer.

=== Webcomics ===
GiantITP.com languished for several months until Burlew added a webcomic to bring in recurring traffic. He started The Order of the Stick, a stick figure fantasy webcomic, in September 2003 by transferring the images from the stick figure miniatures he had produced for his D&D game into a page-long comic. The Order of the Stick gained popularity through 2004. Burlew realized that he had created a successful story when several friends in an online D&D game spent an entire session berating him for writing a scene in which a villain impales a main character. He announced the publication of the first strip compilation in December 2004. Shortly thereafter, he reported that pre-orders for the book had been so successful that he was prepared to quit his job as a graphic designer and commit himself full-time to comic and game writing. Since then, he has produced five additional compilations and three black-and-white prequels for The Order of the Stick that are not featured on the website.

In November 2005, new strips of The Order of the Stick began appearing in Dragon Magazine, significantly extending the potential reach of the comic. Burlew described the feeling of seeing his work on the same page that once held the comic What's New with Phil & Dixie as "awe-inspiring" and "weird". The comic ran in the magazine until its final print issue. These strips were later published in the compilation book called Snips, Snails and Dragon Tales.

Burlew also drew a short-lived webcomic for the Role-Playing Game Association (RPGA) website, Five Foot Steps, that featured more traditional cartoon art instead of stick figures. These depicted a diverse role-playing game group at the fictional Rollmoore College. The strip only lasted for five installments for reasons that have not been made public.

In January 2012, Burlew launched a Kickstarter campaign to get The Order of the Stick: War and XPs back into print, which eventually raised enough money to reprint the whole book series. The drive was the most funded creative work in Kickstarter up to that point, getting more than twenty times the original goal for a total of $1,254,120. During the reprint drive Burlew committed, as rewards for meeting increasing funding goals, to write eight new short stories either about specific characters or in alternative non-canon settings; the characters for three of these stories were chosen by backers as part of the pledge reward.

== Health issues ==
Burlew has an undisclosed chronic illness which sometimes impedes his ability to draw comics and causes periodic delays in schedule. Due to his illness, Burlew reiterated on his website on July 10, 2011 that The Order of the Stick webcomic is produced on "a random schedule ... depending on [his] ability to work."

In September 2012, Burlew seriously injured his right hand in an accident that required emergency surgery and prevented him from drawing for an extended period. Despite physiotherapy, he has said that he does not expect to fully recover from the injury. Forbes highlighted Burlew's open communication on the impact of his injury on the delivery of his Kickstarter rewards: "a great example of both fantastic communication and how a project can get derailed through no fault of anyone's is Rich Burlew's Order of the Stick. [...] Burlew sliced his thumb open on a piece of broken glass, severing tendons and requiring emergency surgery. Worse, it was his drawing hand. [...] There's no telling how long it's going to be before Burlew is able to write again, let alone draw, but the way that he has continued to communicate with his backers has engendered nothing but sympathy and support". In a December 28, 2012 Kickstarter update post, Burlew stated that physical therapy had given him limited use of a pen back and was now able to sign autographs. He was able to post an update to his comic—The Order of The Stick—before the end of 2012 and continued updates into 2013. In a February 28, 2013 post on his website, he describes his recovery as, "not 100% yet—[he] still need to take frequent breaks, and [his] lines don't always go where [he] want them to go—but it's been getting better." His comic continues to be updated as of 2026.

== Works ==
=== Game design credits ===
- Monster Manual III, Contributed. (September 2004, ISBN 0-7869-3430-1)
- Explorer's Handbook, with Frank Brunner and David Noonan. (August 2005, ISBN 0-7869-3691-6)
- Spell Compendium, Contributed. (December 2005, ISBN 0-7869-3702-5)
- The Order of the Stick Adventure Game: The Dungeon of Dorukan, with Kevin Brusky. (October 2006, ASIN 0966347641)
- Dungeonscape, with Jason Bulmahn. (February 2007, ISBN 978-0-7869-4118-6)
- Tome of Artifacts , Contributed. (June 2007, ISBN 978-1-58846-935-9)

=== The Order of the Stick trade paperbacks ===
- The Order of the Stick: Dungeon Crawlin' Fools (February 2005, ISBN 0-9766580-0-3)
- The Order of the Stick: On the Origin of PCs (August 2005, ISBN 0-9766580-1-1)
- The Order of the Stick: No Cure for the Paladin Blues (November 2006, ISBN 0-9766580-3-8)
- The Order of the Stick: Start of Darkness (June 2007, ISBN 978-0-9766580-4-7)
- The Order of the Stick: War and XPs (August 2008, ISBN 978-0-9766580-5-4)
- The Order of the Stick: Don't Split the Party (November 2009, ISBN 978-0-9766580-6-1)
- The Order of the Stick: Snips, Snails, and Dragon Tails (July 2011, ISBN 978-0-9766580-7-8)
- The Order of the Stick: Blood Runs in the Family (December 2014, ISBN 978-0-9766580-8-5)
- The Order of the Stick: Good Deeds Gone Unpunished (April 2018, ISBN 978-0-9766580-9-2)
- The Order of the Stick: Utterly Dwarfed (January 2020, ISBN 978-0-9854139-6-5)
