= Series Acclimation Mil =

- Star Trek: Starfleet Academy episode
- Episode no.: Season 1 Episode 5
- Directed by: Larry Teng
- Written by: Kirsten Beyer; Tawny Newsome
- Original release date: February 5, 2026
- Running time: 58 minutes

Guest appearances
- Chiwetel Ejiofor as Maker; Cirroc Lofton as Jake Sisko; Raoul Bhaneja as Commander Kelrec; Tawny Newsome as Illa Dax; Romeo Carera as Ocam Sadal; Alexander Eling as B'avi; Dale Whibley as Kyle Jokovic; Cecilia Lee as Dzolo; Daniela Sandiford as Music Instructor; Julian Young as Club Leader; Jackie Cox as Bartender; Diedrie Henry as Museum Display Computer

Episode chronology
← Previous "Vox in Excelso"	Next → "Come, Let's Away"
- Star Trek: Starfleet Academy season 1

"Series Acclimation Mil" is the fifth episode of the first season of the American science fiction teen drama television series Star Trek: Starfleet Academy. The episode was written by Kirsten Beyer and series co-producer Tawny Newsome, and directed by Larry Teng. Part of Alex Kurtzman's expanded Star Trek Universe, the series takes place in the 32nd century, the far-future time period that was introduced in Star Trek: Discovery and follows the first new class of Starfleet cadets in over a century as they come of age and train to be officers. The episode was released on Paramount+ on February 5, 2026. In the episode, SAM sets out to prove herself as an emissary for her people by solving an ancient Starfleet mystery, discovering new parts of herself in the process. Elsewhere, Nahla attempts to garner the trust of Commander Kelrec.

The episode received acclaim from critics, who praised the unique structure and tone, the links to Star Trek: Deep Space Nine, the writing, and the performances, particularly that of Kerrice Brooks as SAM.

== Plot ==
SAM (Kerrice Brooks), Starfleet Academy's sole photonic cadet, explains that she was created as an emissary to observe organics and report back to her people on Kasq so they can determine whether or not it is safe for them to integrate with organic society. Her creators instruct her to ignore what they perceive to be trivial things like music, and to enrol in a class called "Confronting the Unexplainable" to further her knowledge, but Professor Illa (Tawny Newsome) informs her that it is too late for her to join. She becomes fascinated by the life of Benjamin Sisko, a human Starfleet captain from centuries ago who became the Emissary of the Prophets, the gods worshiped by the Bajoran people. Sisko's ultimate fate is unknown, and SAM decides to prove herself by finding out what happened to him. SAM attends a meeting of Bajoran students, but offends them by implying that their belief in Sisko is unproveable nonsense. The incident lands her at Chancellor Ake's office; Ake explains to her how revered Sisko is amongst the Bajorans and encourages SAM to keep asking questions.

Ake confronts Kelrec, the Chancellor of the War College when the Academy begins to lose power, and finds out he is trying to prepare for a visit from a dignitary from Alpherat. Attempting to make amends for their previous animosity, Ake recruits The Doctor (Robert Picardo) and Jett Reno (Tig Notaro) to teach him traditional Alpherati customs and foster trust between them. Things initially go well, but Kelrec becomes offended when he begins to think the others aren't taking things seriously, and reveals that he has been harbouring resentment towards Ake for having abandoned Starfleet 15 years earlier. (Note: Ake's resignation from Starfleet is depicted in "Kids These Days".) The two later reconcile when she provides additional context and commits to trying to get along, moving forward.

Exploring a museum dedicated to Sisko, SAM finds recordings from his son Jake (Cirroc Lofton) which focus less on his father's work as an emissary and more on his character. SAM's Maker (Chiwetel Ejiofor) informs her that if she does not find answers within seven days, they will force her to return to Kasq forever, so when Darem (George Hawkins) and Genesis (Bella Shepard) suggest going to a local bar where Benjamin infamously got into a fight as a cadet, she agrees and allows Caleb (Sandro Rosta) to alter her programming and make her drunk. In this state, she encourages Jay-Den (Karim Diané) to flirt with Kyle (Dale Whibley) and Caleb to stop avoiding Tarima (Zoë Steiner), resulting in the two sharing a kiss. When cadets from the War College who are bitter about losing the prank war against the Academy (Note: As depicted in "Vitus Reflux".) start causing trouble, SAM punches one of them and the group are kicked out. SAM later admits her failure to Professor Illa, who hands her the only copy of Jake's unpublished book about his father. (Note: Jake's novel, Anslem, was first mentioned in the Star Trek: Deep Space Nine episode "The Visitor".) Jake then appears to SAM and shares that even though his father embraced being an emissary, he did it his way, also embracing family, giving SAM the courage to believe she can also represent Kasq without having to sacrifice her own identity. Illa then tells SAM she can enrol in her class the following year, and reveals that she is the current host of the symbiont Dax, one of whose previous hosts was a mentor to Benjamin Sisko. SAM reports back to her Maker that she will complete her mission in her own way, and continues her life at the Academy with a renewed sense of self.

== Production ==
=== Writing ===
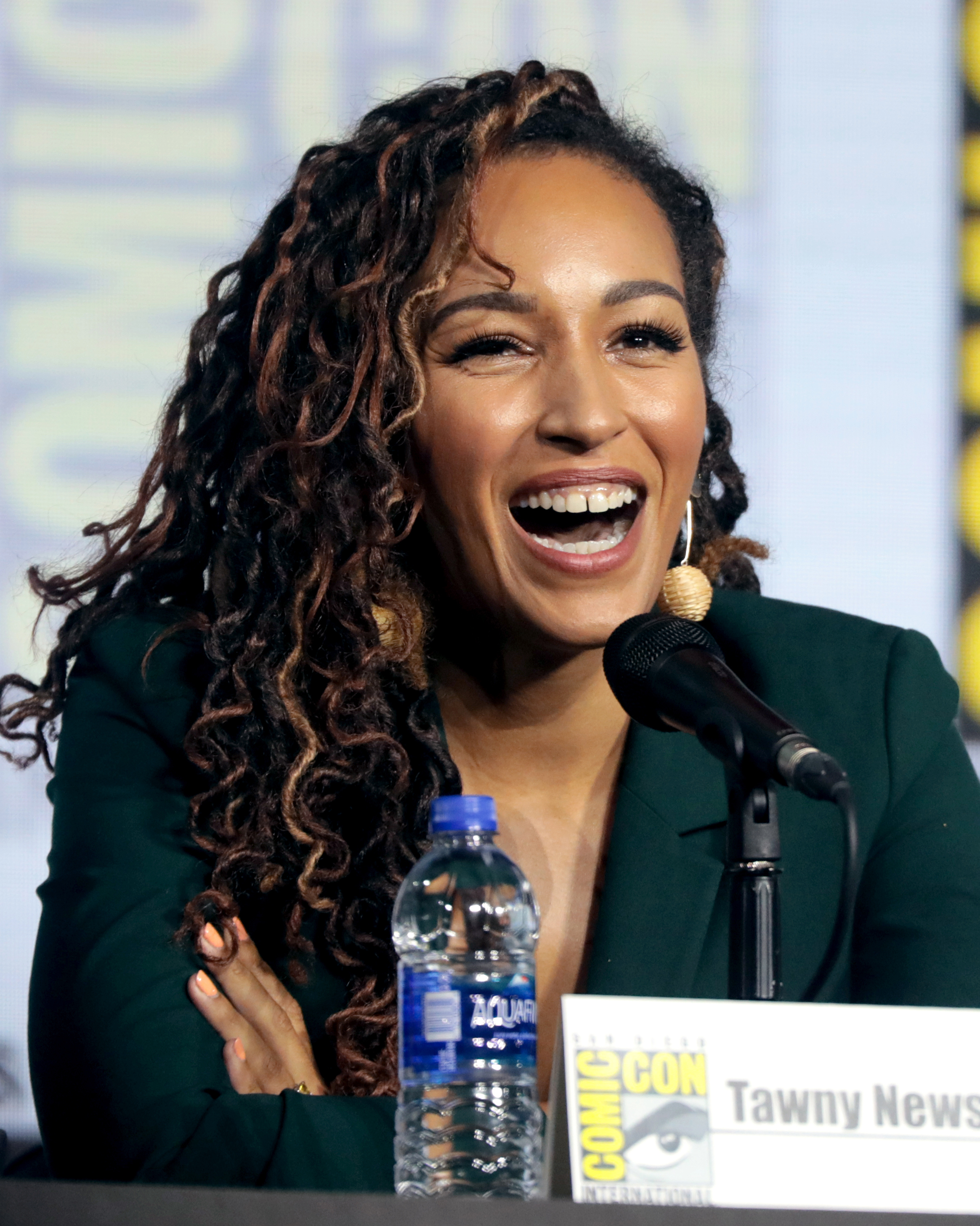
Tawny Newsome, who previously played Beckett Mariner in Star Trek: Lower Decks, co-wrote and played Professor Illa Dax in the episode.

The episode was written by Kirsten Beyer and series co-producer Tawny Newsome, marking the first writing credit on the show for both. Newsome is best known for portraying Beckett Mariner in the animated series Star Trek: Lower Decks and appearing once in live action in "Those Old Scientists", an episode of the second season of Star Trek: Strange New Worlds. After being impressed by her improvisations during the filming of the latter episode, Star Trek executive producer Alex Kurtzman hired her as a writer for Starfleet Academy.

Describing herself as a "die-hard fan" of Star Trek: Deep Space Nine, Newsome expressed her "singular focus" when she entered the writer's room was to reference the show in a "meaningful way" on Starfleet Academy. "Series Acclimation Mil" is the first episode of television that Newsome had written and that she was "pretty adamant" that her episode be an homage to Benjamin and Jake Sisko, feeling that modern Star Trek had not given the characters their due despite them and Deep Space Nine as a whole being such significant parts of the franchise's canon. Newsome called the episode a "gargantuan feat" to get made, and worked closely with co-writer Beyer, whom she described as a "fierce advocate", showrunner Noga Landau, executive producers Alex Kurtzman and Aaron Baiers, and Jake's actor Cirroc Lofton to realise her vision. Landau stated that she, Newsome, and Beyer, who was co-creator of Star Trek: Picard, were in agreement about making a "love letter" episode to Deep Space Nine and the Sisko family, but that they "worked hard" to ensure it also fit in with the tone and theme of Starfleet Academy.

Regarding the decision to leave Benjamin Sisko's ultimate fate ambiguous, series co-showrunners Noga Landau and Alex Kurtzman felt it was important not to interfere with Deep Space Nine's conclusion, with Kurtzman explaining that, "if we had given you a definitive answer, no matter what answer we'd given, I think you would have been really disappointed because it would have broken what the point of that show was and what the point of that ending was about", adding that he believed the reveals of the episode would give fans a "newer understanding" of the ending of that series.

Kerrice Brooks, who plays SAM, explained that she drew on her own experiences with loss to help her emotionally connect to her character's arc in the episode, stating, "the way that Sisko died was unexplainable. For me, when my granddad died, it felt very unexplainable, too", adding that on the set, it felt like "like [she] was talking to two people at the same time that were merging into one. It felt like everything was collapsing in and colliding." She also expressed that some of SAM's personality traits or behaviours, such as her insulting of the Bajorans, comes from a place of "naïve arrogance" and a lack of total understanding of organic culture and society. Of SAM's connection to Benjamin Sisko and his influence on her development despite the two character having never met, she explained, "she knew so much about Sisko and she knew what he liked, what he didn’t like. He liked tomatoes, he ate gumbo, Creole kitchen, baseball, Jake. She knew Bajor. She knew so much about him, but also at the same time, felt so cut. There was a cut cord somehow and for whatever reason. And so it felt like the entire time Sam’s like grasping in the dark, trying to find and feel her way to maybe what her destiny could look like.

=== Filming ===
The episode includes scenes featuring SAM breaking the fourth wall and speaking directly to the camera. Newsome stated that the unique structure and break from Starfleet Academy's usual format was proposed by Kurtzman, who felt it was a "special episode" that should look and feel different due to the focus on SAM, a non-organic character. Of this, Newsome stated, "I think we were just so inspired by the fact that we don’t know much about Kasq yet, and so we got to be the architects of this new species. And the fact that they process information so differently gave us the liberty to process the information differently for the medium, for the audience. And it just also spoke to my tendencies as a writer, which are a little bit outside of this genre. This is my first time writing narrative TV. I’ve written a lot of sketch and I primarily only do comedy. So while this episode has incredible heart – largely thanks to Kirsten — the format break was more suited to my style of writing. And the only person in my life who’s read nearly everything I’ve written is Alex Kurtzman, so I think that was intentional on his part." Newsome noted that the original draft of the episode was 72 pages long and included a lot of the on-screen graphics that made it into the final product, and that she pitched many comedic suggestions to director Larry Teng during filming to give to the background actors to give the impression that characters are "living full lives" despite them not being the focal point of the show.

Kerrice Brooks, who portrays SAM, expressed that the main goal of the episode was to honor Avery Brooks and his character, the first black captain in Star Trek history stating, "we just wanted to honor Avery. I hope we did." Of filming, she explained, "It was really immersive. I want to say some of [the props] on set were the original props from Deep Space Nine. I know that the uniform was. You could literally feel the weight in the room as walked through the set during rehearsal. I don't know if it was the lighting or what, but you just felt how important all of it was. I felt like I didn't have to act too much in the scene, what I needed — it was just there." Brooks enjoyed breaking the fourth wall during the episode, noting that excerpts of the opening scene were part of her original audition for the show. She felt that her character arc during the episode was "a very rewarding experience", and felt it helped bring elements of Sisko's own character arcs on Deep Space Nine "full circle". Discussing the scenes between SAM and Illa Dax, Brooks explained, "in the writers room for the show, Tawny created and developed [SAM]. Shooting that scene, I forget the day we shot that, but we mostly shot the episode in sequential order. And that scene was pretty emotional, acting-wise. Especially with Tawny being such a big Deep Space Nine fan." She also called her scenes with Cirroc Lofton as a "special" experience, and that his presence made her "step up [her] game".

=== Casting ===
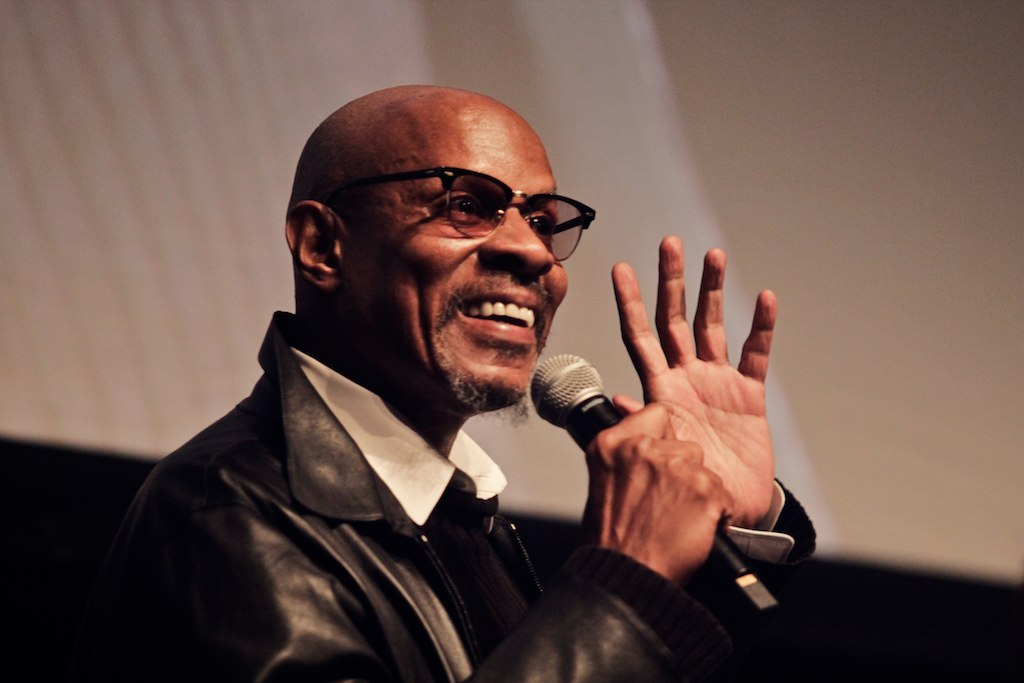
The episode is a tribute to Benjamin Sisko, portrayed by Avery Brooks.

Main cast members Oded Fehr and Gina Yashere do not appear and are not credited. The episode features recurring cast members Raoul Bhaneja as Commander Kelrec, the Chancellor of the War College, Romeo Carera as Academy cadet Ocam Sadal, Alexander Eling, Cecilia Lee, and Dale Whibley as War College cadets B'avi, Dzolo, and Kyle Djokovic, and the voice of Stephen Colbert as the Digital Dean of Starfleet Academy. Newsome makes a guest appearance as Professor Illa Dax, while Chiwetel Ejiofor voices SAM's Maker. RuPaul's Drag Race competitor Jackie Cox cameos as a bartender at the Academy bar. Newsome noted that she did not initially intend to appear in the episode herself, but that Landau suggested it once they had confirmed that the "shepherd" of the story would be a host of the Dax symbiont, which appeared in Deep Space Nine played by various actors.

Cirroc Lofton reprises his role as Jake Sisko, whom he portrayed on Deep Space Nine across all seven seasons from 1993 to 1999. Avery Brooks, who played Jake's father Benjamin Sisko and the focus of the episode, did not reprise his role due to his retirement from acting in 2013, but archival audio of him reciting poetry taken from his 2007 album Here is used during the episode's final scenes. The decision to include this narration was suggested by Lofton, who gave Newsome his own copy of the album, and contacted Brooks for his approval, with the two having remained close following their work on Deep Space Nine. Newsome noted that she and Lofton talked for "months and months" prior to the episode, and felt that he deserved an executive producer credit for his contributions, with Lofton adding that his participation in the episode was fuelled by the chance to pay homage to Brooks and the Sisko family. Newsome explained that Brooks called her, Kerrice Brooks, and Lofton, during filming to give his blessing and "pass the torch".

== Release ==
"Series Acclimation Mil" was released on February 5, 2026, on Paramount+.

== Reception ==
Lacy Baugher of Den of Geek gave the episode four and a half stars out of five and declared it the show's "best episode yet". She praised the "youthful feel", "fun, bubbly vibe", and change in format from the previous episode "Vox in Excelso", and mixture of coming-of-age tale and "love letter" to Deep Space Nine, crediting Newsome and Beyer's writing for honoring that series while still pushing the franchise forward. She also noted that, while she enjoyed the lore, "even without all that, “Series Acclimation Mil” is also just a really satisfying story of a young woman learning how to navigate the conflict between the duty that’s been thrust upon her and the things she really wants." Baugher lauded Brooks' performance as SAM, calling her a "a literal ray of sunshine throughout, with an infectious demeanor that fully conveys SAM’s excitement and wonder at the situations she finds herself in", and liked that the episode didn't provide any definitive answer about what happened to Benjamin Sisko. She also felt the cadets going to the bar was a "highlight of the hour", but criticised the adult plot for being largely irrelevant and unconnected to the rest of the episode.

Writing for IGN, Scott Collura awarded the episode a rating of eight out of ten, stating, "Starfleet Academy skillfully revisits the legend of Captain Sisko, while also using the opportunity to dig in on Kerrice Brooks’ character SAM. In what could’ve been a clumsy episode that relied simply on nostalgia, as Star Trek has sometimes made the mistake of doing in recent years, “Series Acclimation Mil” instead tells a sweet story of empowerment and acceptance about what we can, and can’t, change in our lives." He praised the writing for using Sisko's legacy to expand SAM's character and the "unconventional" filming of the episode, and the return of Lofton as Jake Sisko. He also felt the episode's secondary plotline about Kelrec was "amusing", and praised the performanes of Notaro and Picardo.

In a three-star review, Diana Kreng of TV Fanatic praised the b-plot, writing, "quick response to the Ake side plot with Kelrec and the soup ritual. First of all, sitting down for this absurd event with The Doctor and Jett Reno is comedic gold. His total commitment to the bit juxtaposed with her total disregard for protocols was a masterclass in contrast and timing." She also praised SAM's characterisation in the episode, the writing, and the appearance of Lofton as Jake Sisko.
