= 300th Night =

- Star Trek: Starfleet Academy episode
- Episode no.: Season 1 Episode 9
- Directed by: Jonathan Frakes
- Story by: Kirsten Beyer; Kenneth Lin
- Teleplay by: Kirsten Beyer
- Cinematography by: Maya Bankovic
- Original release date: March 5, 2026
- Running time: 57 minutes

Guest appearances
- Raoul Bhaneja as Commander Kelrec; Tatiana Maslany as Anisha Mir

Episode chronology
← Previous "The Life of the Stars"	Next → "Rubincon"

"300th Night" is the ninth episode of the first season of the American science fiction teen drama television series Star Trek: Starfleet Academy. The episode was written by Kirsten Beyer and Kenneth Lin, and directed by long-time Star Trek director and actor Jonathan Frakes. Part of Alex Kurtzman's expanded Star Trek Universe, the series takes place in the 32nd century, the far-future time period that was introduced in Star Trek: Discovery and follows the first new class of Starfleet cadets in over a century as they come of age and train to be officers. The episode was released on Paramount+ on March 5, 2026.

In the episode, Caleb (Sandro Rosta) must choose between the life he thought he wanted and the life he's built for himself at Starfleet Academy. Meanwhile, Nahla (Holly Hunter) breaks protocol in one final gambit to keep her promise to him as the Federation faces an unexpected threat. The episode received a positive reception from critics, who praised the emotional stakes, reunion between Caleb and his mother, and the performances of the cast, particularly Hunter, Kerrice Brooks, George Hawkins, and Tatiana Maslany.

== Plot ==
As the cadets celebrate the end of the academic year, Jay-Den (Karim Diané) honors his new friends with a Klingon ritual of r'uustai, (Note: Worf was previously seen performing the r'uustai with Jeremy Aster in the Star Trek: The Next Generation episode "The Bonding".) though Caleb declines to participate and inadvertently runs into Tarima (Zoë Steiner), who chastises him from running away from commitment. SAM (Kerrice Brooks) also calls him out, and he reveals his frustrations over failing to find his mother. With her help, he is able to unlock two years of unanswered messages sent from Anisha (Tatiana Maslany), the most recent of which stated that she was hiding out on the planet Ukeck. Rushing to tell Ake of his breakthrough, Caleb overhears Admiral Vance (Oded Fehr) telling her and Kelrec (Raoul Bhaneja) that Braka and the Venari Ral have begun deploying the Omega 47 (Note: The Omega molecule previously appeared in the Star Trek: Voyager episode "The Omega Directive".) mines that they stole from Starfleet which can kill billions and wipe out all warp travel. Vance orders the USS Athena to stay on course to Betazed (Note: Betazed was selected as the new capital of the Federation during "Vitus Reflux".) and rendezvous with the rest of the fleet.

Caleb and SAM steal a shuttle to travel to Ukeck, forcing Genesis (Bella Shepard) and Darem (George Hawkins) to come with them when they get caught. The shuttle is damaged on the journey, but they successfully make it to the planet, and Caleb searches the local markets for Anisha while the others trade for parts so they can complete repairs. Finding his mother, they share an emotional reunion, but she is suspicious of his friends, and Caleb lies about how he met them due to Anisha's distrust of Starfleet. She uses her engineering skills to build the parts they need to repair the shuttle, and leaves to book passage for her and Caleb on a cargo vessel when the Venari Ral arrive to annex the planet. The other cadets realise Caleb is not coming back to the academy with them and argue with him, though Caleb commits to choosing to stay with his mother.

As Athena drops off the other cadets on Betazed, Jay-Den and Tarima tell Ake that Caleb and the others are gone. Vance knows not to order Ake to stay but informs her that if she takes the ship outside of Federation space, he won't be able to help her. Accompanied by Reno (Tig Notaro), The Doctor (Robert Picardo) and a stowaway Jay-Den and Tarima, they unsuccessfully attempt to locate the stolen shuttle and Ake makes the decision to leave Federation space and warp to Ukeck. Trying to make their way back to their shuttle, Darem, SAM, and Genesis are captured by Venari Ral, who work out that they are Starfleet, and Caleb and Anisha are forced to intervene to save them despite her hatred of the Federation. Ake and the Athena then arrive and transport them off planet. The Doctor treats Anisha for a gunshot wound she sustained in the fight, while the rest of the cadets take up positions on the bridge to help evade pursuing Venari Ral ships. Reno is forced to separate the Athena's saucer from the rest of the ship so they can escape, abandoning it to the enemy. When they try to return to Federation space, Ake discovers that Braka has walled in the entire Federation with Omega mines so he can reign supreme everywhere else in the galaxy. As the sole Starfleet ship outside the barrier, Reno sends out a lonely mayday while Nahla has a surprise reunion with Anisha, the woman she put in prison and separated from her only son.

== Production ==
=== Writing ===
The episode was written by Kirsten Beyer and Kenneth Lin, marking the second writing credit on the show for both with only Kirsten Beyer writing the teleplay.

=== Directing ===
The episode was directed by Jonathan Frakes, who has directed episodes across seven different shows in the Star Trek franchise, as well as two feature films. Discussing the show, Frakes stated, "Alex Kurtzman and Noga [Landau], they laid out the season in a way that I thought brilliantly gave a lot of the characters key moments to reveal who they are, which let the audience get to know them. So by the time I got there at episode nine, Alex had really already established a lot of things, including a motif of how he wanted the show shot. He shared the first two episodes with me when I got there, and he was using these new lenses, these anamorphic spherical lenses. They’re wide, but we could shoot very tight with them on people’s faces. And this episode, as you see, is filled with emotion for that kind of shooting." Frakes enjoyed the "emotions" of the reunion between Caleb and Anisha, but expressed that his favorite scene to direct was where Caleb argues with the other cadets on Ukeck. Frakes felt that his episode leads well into the season finale, which was directed by Olatunde Osunsanmi, with the two having directed separate parts of a season finale previously on Star Trek: Discovery. They worked closely together on "300th Night"'s final scene of Ake and Anisha in the medbay, with Frakes explaining, "the handoff takes place in that little medbay with the two actors, and he and I were together to set up the way he wanted to start. So certainly that, specifically, was in place. But when I prep, I prep. He’s around all the time. I’m very close with him, and we’ve worked together quite a bit, and we’re very competitive. He inspires me, and I think I inspire him, and we have a ball making stuff." Frakes also praised his experience working with Holly Hunter and spoke positively about spending time with her and the crew spending time rehearsing her scenes in order for her to find her blocking organically.

Discussing his views on directing for Starfleet Academy, Frakes stated, it was literally the biggest Star Trek set ever, and so that was a pretty daunting and funny way to shoot. It was also peppered with enormous movie stars, which we'd never had before, and some wonderful new actors who had barely been on screen. By the time I got to them in Episode 9, I benefited from all the many thousands of hours they had spent working together, finding themselves, finding their rhythms, and finding their music. Star Trek: Starfleet Academy was already a well-oiled machine." He also felt that Tatiana Maslany's Anisha was the episode's "secret weapon" due to her return, having last appeared in the pilot, and how he "embraced" the close-up shots used by Alex Kurtzman in that episode to reflect the emotions and intimacy between Anisha and Caleb during their reunion.

== Release ==
"300th Night" was released on March 5, 2026, on Paramount+.

== Reception ==
The episode received a positive reception from critics. Keith DiCandido of Reactor stated that, "this episode of Starfleet Academy (and the next one, as this one ends on a cliffhanger leading to next week’s season finale) is exactly the kind of episode I didn’t want to see in a show about the Academy, so imagine my surprise to have completely and unreservedly loved the episode all to pieces. Kudos to scripter (and, full disclosure, friend of your humble reviewer) Kirsten Beyer and director Jonathan Frakes for pulling it off." He felt that the episode "builds very skillfully on what’s already been established about the characters in general and about Caleb and Ake in particular", and praised the scenes between Caleb and SAM as "absolutely magnificent" as well as the George Hawkins' comedic performance as a drunken Darem. He lauded the reunion between Caleb and Anisha, particularly Maslany's performance, writing, "the reunion scene is magnificently played by the always-brilliant Tatiana Maslany and director Frakes. Both Anisha and Caleb are wearing masks over the bottoms of their faces, as well as hoods. So we only see Anisha’s eyes, but that’s more than enough for Maslany to show Anisha going from anger at the person she thinks is stalking her to the slow realization that this is her son—all with just her eyes. Maslany proved on Orphan Black that she is one of the best actors in the history of humanity, and scenes like this serve as additional reminders."

Giving the episode an "A" rating, Daniel Bibby of Winter Is Coming wrote, "'300th Night' pays off many of the show's original storylines in a way that no one could have predicted. After an uneven season that featured a couple of dud episodes, "300th Night" is further evidence that Starfleet Academy is far better than the haters are saying." He felt the use of the ensemble cast was unbalanced, criticising how Jay-Den and Tarima were "given very little to do", but praised the development of Caleb's character and his reunion with Anisha, as well as Kerrice Brook's performance as SAM following her upgrade in the previous episode.

Lacy Baugher of Den of Geek gave the episode three and a half stars out of five. She praised the scenes between Caleb and Anisha, writing, "it is, admittedly, wildly convenient that Caleb manages to stumble upon his mother within roughly 120 seconds of beaming into Ukek’s run-down space market, but their reunion is very moving, even if it comes complete with some uncomfortable undertones" and Hunter's performance as Ake, noting that, "I wish this show were more interested in exploring some of the psychological issues Braka called her out on when it comes to her relationship with [Caleb], but Holly Hunter plays a determined avenging angel well, and Ake’s insistence that she keep the promises made to protect these kids is perfectly in keeping with the woman we’ve come to know her as." She concluded by writing that there is "a lot of ground for the season’s final episode to cover, but at this point, Starfleet Academy’s earned a certain degree of trust that the show will manage to pull it off."
