= Rubincon =

- Star Trek: Starfleet Academy episode
- Episode no.: Season 1 Episode 10
- Directed by: Olatunde Osunsanmi
- Story by: Noga Landau; Gaia Violo
- Teleplay by: Kirsten Beyer; Alex Kurtzman
- Original release date: March 12, 2026
- Running time: 68 minutes

Guest appearances
- Paul Giamatti as Nus Braka; Tatiana Maslany as Anisha Mir

Episode chronology
← Previous "300th Night"	Next → —

"Rubincon" is the tenth episode and season finale of the first season of the American science fiction teen drama television series Star Trek: Starfleet Academy. The episode was written by Kirsten Beyer and executive producer Alex Kurtzman from a story by Noga Landau and series creator Gaia Violo, and directed by Olatunde Osunsanmi. Part of Kurtzman's expanded Star Trek Universe, the series takes place in the 32nd century, the far-future time period that was introduced in Star Trek: Discovery and follows the first new class of Starfleet cadets in over a century as they come of age and train to be officers. The episode was released on Paramount+ on March 12, 2026.

In the episode, the crew of the USS Athena attempts to save the Federation from Nus Braka's plans. Nahla must confront her past mistakes, while the cadets are forced to step up to complete their mission when everything is on the line. The episode received a generally positive reception from critics, who praised the performances of the cast.

== Plot ==
Remembering how she was wronged, (Note: As depicted in "Kids These Days".) Anisha (Tatiana Maslany) attempts to attack Ake (Holly Hunter) and demands to leave the USS Athena, but is informed that Braka's plans make that impossible. The ship connects with Admiral Vance (Oded Fehr) and Lura Thok (Gina Yashere), who tell them that, if Braka's Omega 47 mines are detonated, at least 240 inhabited planets would be caught in the blast area, and that Braka is forming a cartel of non-Federation worlds to take over the galaxy. Braka (Paul Giamatti) and the Venari Ral then arrive, and Ake has Jett Reno (Tig Notaro) hide the cadets in an air lock. Surprised to see Anisha alive, Ake bluffs that she, Reno, and The Doctor (Robert Picardo) had rescued her in order to keep her promise to Caleb (Sandro Rosta). Braka then beams Ake and Anisha away and has the Venari Ral fire on the Athena, seemingly destroying it.

Reno reveals to the cadets that The Doctor created a holographic decoy of the Athena exploding, but that doing so has scrambled his systems. SAM (Kerrice Brooks) and Jay-Den (Karim Diané) attempt to repair him while Reno and the others form a plan to deactivate the minefield. While repairing the ship's warp drive, Reno praises Caleb for returning to rescue his friends on Ukeck, (Note: As depicted in "300th Night".) and tells him not a lot of people would have done so. With Genesis' (Bella Shepard) help, SAM and Jay-Den are able to decode The Doctor's message that they can alter the rubin particles to stabilise the Omega 47 within the mines, rendering them inert. Using Caleb as a conduit, Tarima (Zoë Steiner) is able to locate Anisha with her telepathic powers, and Darem (George Hawkins) sets a course for her while SAM develops an algorithm to neutralise the mines.

Braka takes Ake and Anisha to the abandoned Athena atrium, where Ake surreptitiously communicates to Anisha that Caleb is still alive. Braka broadcasts a theatrical communication to the wider galaxy titled "Federation on Trial!" wherein Ake represents the Federation and Anisha Mir represents everyone who feels ignored or mistreated by them. Braka also recounts his childhood of poverty and recalls Federation ships flying over his colony without offering aid. Anisha criticises Ake for what she did to her and Caleb and, while Ake admits that she and the Federation were wrong, she also reminds Anisha that she and Braka killed a Federation officer that day and that their actions impacted the lives of his children, just as hers impacted Caleb's. Anisha ultimately proclaims she does not care, hates Ake, and declares her guilty.

To buy SAM more time, Caleb takes a shuttle to the atrium. Speaking to Anisha, he expresses how Starfleet helped provide him with a sense of purpose and belonging and that Ake and the Federation have belief in him and in the prosperity of the galaxy. Braka laughs this off as Federation brainwashing and propaganda but Ake, sensing a chance to turn things around, works with Caleb and Anisha to reveal that the Federation didn't destroy Braka's colony as he claimed, but that Braka's father accidentally ignited their own atmosphere attempting to build a weapon. The cartel delegates in attendance gradually dissipate after Ake questions whether they are willing to follow a man still trapped in childhood whose entire worldview is based on a lie. Braka attempts to detonate the Omega 47 mines, but SAM completes her algorithm and stabilises them. Federation ships then warp in to arrest Braka and the Venari Ral.

Some time later, the saucer and atrium of the Athena are rejoined and repaired as the cadets prepare for the summer break. Caleb makes plans to visit Earth with Anisha, who expresses that, while she wishes he would not return to Starfleet Academy for the next academic year, she knows he has found a new home there. Caleb then gathers with the other cadets at an atrium viewing point overlooking Betazed.

== Production ==
=== Writing ===
The episode was written by Kirsten Beyer and Alex Kurtzman, marking the third writing credit on the show for Beyer and first for Kurtzman. The story was conceived by Noga Landau and Gaia Violo.

Discussing the decision to depict a trial in the episode, Kurtzman stated, "I think Star Trek is only interesting when you're interrogating it. I think the blind devotion to an idea is ultimately how tyranny finds its way. From a creative point of view, it’s the old adage: the villain is the hero of their own story. And if you're really following through with that, it means that you have to understand that the villain has a real perspective about who they are and how they got there." Landau echoed this and explained how the trial impacted Anisha's character and her decision to allow Caleb to remain at the academy despite her hatred of the Federation stating, "even though she has every reason going into these last couple of episodes to hate the Federation, to mistrust them, to believe that they are bad faith actors, through the events of these last two episodes, she's able to realize...that their intentions are good. The healing she gets to do with Nahla is important for her to be able to make peace with the fact that Caleb [her son] really is going to live an extraordinary life in Starfleet."

Regarding the dynamic between Braka and Ake, Landau explained, "one of my favorite parts of what we were able to do in this finale was we were able to really understand why Nus is the way that he is, and we were able to peel back just one layer to see what [was behind] this man, all of his bravado and all of his justifications for brutality. And I think what was so fun about this finale was showing too that Nahla, by representing the spirit of the Federation, really, the spirit of the Federation of the 32nd century, that it’s been around for so long, that it has been battered by life itself also, but that rather than choose brutality at the end of the day, it continues to try and choose the act of accountability, that she has accountability. She’s accountable for the mistakes that she’s made and that she’s willing to stand on trial and to face it and to use her own brilliance, her own insights, her own genius to defend herself in front of the galaxy and to uphold her values in front of the galaxy, all while showing that choosing brutality, even though brutal things have been done to you in the case of Nus, is never going to get you what you want. And you will never win. You will continue to be prisoner to your own trauma, your own darkness, and your own mistakes. So I think being able to do all of that in this finale with this trial between these two characters was awesome because it’s Star Trek at its best. This is why we make Star Trek. We don’t make Star Trek so that you save the day by shooting people. We make Star Trek so that by the end of the day, you’ve used your own intellect and you’ve used your knowledge of science and of the galaxy to justify your own existence and your own continuance."

== Release ==
"Rubincon" was released on March 12, 2026, on Paramount+.

== Reception ==
The episode received generally positive reviews from critics.

Lacy Baugher of Den of Geek awarded the episode five stars out of five. She noted that, while a lot of the plot was "kind of ridiculous", she felt "emotionally, it hits all the necessary beats to show us just how far these kids have come this year". She praised how "remarkably even-handed" the trial was in depicting both Ake and Anisha's viewpoints and lauded the performances of Hunter and Maslany, writing, "Hunter both commands and conveys immense sympathy throughout, largely through little more than shifts in facial expressions. Nahla Ake is not a particularly demonstrative or even emotionally expressive woman, but Hunter somehow makes her eyes seem ancient, full of competing griefs all snarled together. Maslany gets the showier part, allowed to rage and scream in a way that Hunter is not, yet both feel equally matched against each other in terms of both emotion and argument." Concluding her review, she declared that "Star Trek: Starfleet Academy wraps up its first season with a finale that’s predictably grand in scope: The future of the Federation is at stake, multiple lives are at risk, and Caleb is forced to face some uncomfortable choices about the two halves of himself that have been at war for most of the season. There’s a prodigious amount of technobabble, a last-second save (because of course there is), and some important lessons about found family and community. It is, in short, peak Star Trek, and while it’s certainly possible to argue that its ending is more than a little pat, it’s also satisfying in the way that this franchise always is."

Writing for IGN, Scott Collura gave the episode a seven out of ten and gave particular praise to the performances of the entire cast, but felt the Doctor's storyline and Braka's show trial felt jarring. He concluded his review by writing, "as Starfleet Academy Season 1 ends, it feels like the cadets are just getting started. I’m glad that Alex Kurtzman and his team have used this show as a venue to try new and different things with Star Trek, even if they haven’t always worked. With the future of the franchise more uncertain now than it has been in the past decade, it’s good to know that we have at least one more season of Starfleet Academy to look forward to where hopefully new frontiers will continue to be pushed. I’ll be back to talk about Season 2 whenever it arrives, so I hope you’ll join me then!"

In a positive review, Keith DiCandido of Reactor praised the "excellent" finale, particularly highlighting how Ake brought up the death of a Starfleet officer during her trial and how it goes against the franchise's infamous "redshirt problem". He lauded Maslany's performance as Anisha and Notaro's performance as Reno, as well as the performances of Brooks and Shepard as SAM and Genesis, and the "magnificent" portion of the episode that takes place on the Athena with Reno, the Doctor, and the cadets. DiCandido did criticise the use of tropes in the episode however, writing that "this show in particular is best when the stakes aren’t high, and they’ve mostly stuck with that, but having Braka threaten the entire Federation is just ridiculous and a contrivance so that our one ship with its spunky cadets will save the day."

Similarly, Daniel Bibby of Winter Is Coming felt the episode was not as good as the previous instalment, "300th Night", and expressed that the cliffhanger set unrealistic expectations that the finale was unable to fulfil, ultimately giving the episode a "C" rating. He described The Doctor going into the Athena computer to fool the Venari Ral into believing the ship was destroyed as an "early highlight" of the episode, and stated the twist that Braka's hatred of the Federation was based on a lie was "interesting, but also felt a little cheap" and "stripped Giamatti's character of his villain status". Bibby expressed that a character death may have made the finale more impactful, noting the sidelining of The Doctor and complete absence of Ocam Sadal as evidence that the show's cast is "bloated". He concluded his mixed review by writing, "Star Trek: Starfleet Academy season 1, Episode 10, "Rubincon," was set up to be an all-time great in terms of franchise finales. The penultimate installment was fantastic. Unfortunately, what we actually got was a rather lukewarm, textbook affair. Through no real fault of its own, "Rubincon" brings the show's inaugural run to a largely solid ending that's somehow not all that impressive."
