= Ko'Zeine =

- Star Trek: Starfleet Academy episode
- Episode no.: Season 1 Episode 7
- Directed by: Andi Armaganian
- Written by: Eric Anthony Glover; Alex Taub
- Cinematography by: Philip Lanyon
- Editing by: Bartholomew Burcham
- Original release date: February 19, 2026
- Running time: 55 minutes

Guest appearances
- Dale Whibley as Kyle Jokovic; Jaelynn Thora Brooks as Kaira; Alexa Yaphe as Quill; Chris Lightfoot as Darem's Father; Carla Deverish as Darem's Mother; Wyatt Lamoureux as Khionian Priest; Carlos Pinder as Kaira's Father; Kelly Fanson as Kaira's Mother; Angelica Lisk-Hann as Khionian Royal Guard; Dillon Jagersky as Khionian Royal Guard

Episode chronology
← Previous "Come, Let's Away"	Next → "The Life of the Stars"
- Star Trek: Starfleet Academy season 1

"Ko'Zeine" is the seventh episode of the first season of the American science fiction teen drama television series Star Trek: Starfleet Academy. The episode was written by Alex Taub and Eric Anthony Glover, and directed by Andi Armaganian. Part of Alex Kurtzman's expanded Star Trek Universe, the series takes place in the 32nd century, the far-future time period that was introduced in Star Trek: Discovery and follows the first new class of Starfleet cadets in over a century as they come of age and train to be officers. The episode was released on Paramount+ on February 19, 2026. In the episode, Darem relies on Jay-Den's support as he confronts his future, while Genesis is forced to reckon with trying to cover up her past.

The episode received generally positive reviews from critics, who praised exploration of Darem and Gensis' characters and the performances of George Hawkins, Bella Shepard, Sandro Rosta, and Karim Diané, though some criticised the comparatively low stakes and a lack of exploration of the fallout of the previous episode.

== Plot ==
One month after the events on the USS Miyazaki, (Note: As depicted in "Come, Let's Away".) Starfleet Academy continue to contend with the fallout; Nahla (Holly Hunter) wrestles with her guilt, SAM (Kerrice Brooks) still occasionally glitches, and Caleb (Sandro Rosta) has avoided contacting Tarima, who returned to Betazed to recover from her injuries. Ake tells Genesis (Bella Shepard) that she is going to recommend her for a captaincy training programme following her part during the crisis, and argues with Caleb, who is frustrated that she did not ask Nus Braka about his mother. She reaffirms that she is committed to finding Caleb's mother, and he convinces her to let him stay at the academy alone over a holiday break. Genesis also chooses to stay rather than spending time with her father, who is too preoccupied with admiral business to spend any meaningful time with her. Caleb and Genesis enjoy the freedom of the abandoned Academy, and she encourages him to step up and reach out to Tarima. She later tricks him into helping her access the bridge, where she attempts to hack into her own Academy application. They are caught by Reno (Tig Notaro), who calls Ake back to reprimand them. Genesis reveals that she lied on her application and that she was attempting to alter it so her secrets would not be discovered during her consideration for the captaincy programme. Ake rescinds her recommendation for the programme, but allows Genesis to remain at the academy. Caleb sends a message to Tarima, telling her how much he misses her.

Jay-Den's (Karim Diané) plans for a holiday trip with his boyfriend Kyle (Dale Whibley) is interrupted when he sees Darem (George Hawkins) being kidnapped from his dorm room, and reluctantly follows them through a portal to Khionia. Attempting a rescue, Darem reveals that the kidnapping was part of a Khionian pre-marriage ritual, telling him that he was promised to his best friend Kaira by their families when they were children, and covers up the mistake by telling the Khionians that Jay-Den is his Ko'Zeine, their equalvalent of a best man. Kaira, whose parents are the reigning king and queen, informs Darem that they are planning to abdicate imminently following some health scares, forcing them to move their wedding forward, having initially planned to wed after Darem had spent a few years in service as a Starfleet officer. Jay-Den encourages Darem to consider whether he wants to give up on being part of Starfleet to marry Kaira, but Darem insists that he must do his duty for his people, causing an argument when he tells Jay-Den that they can't all run away from their responsibilities. (Note: As depicted in "Vox in Excelso".) Darem goes through with the ceremony, and Jay-Den reluctantly gives his Ko'Zeine speech. Realising from the speech that Darem has suppressed his true self to comply with duty and tradition, Kaira privately suggests that he abdicate so she can annul the marriage and allow him to return to Starfleet Academy.

== Production ==
=== Writing ===
The episode was written by Alex Taub and Eric Anthony Glover, marking the second writing credit on the show for both.

George Hawkins, who portrays Darem, described it as "amazing", "freeing", and "such a privilege" to introduce and explore Khionian culture in the episode, and noted that he worked hard on altering his physicality and composure to indicate at his character's confidence, ego, and royal connections. Discussing the episode and its themes of identity and duty, and Darem's decision at the end, he explained, "You see it in the moment where Kiara gives Darem permission to live the life that he wants to live, or live the life that feels truer to him. Because I can imagine for Darem, there’s a sort of purpose, and there's fulfilment in actually being the king and actually living the life with Kiara and leading that life out. But it's just that moment where you see everyone turn around, where Kyra expresses to everyone and sort of lets everyone know what's happened. And you see his parents turn, and that’s the moment", noting that the episode is "really important for Darem’s story, to see what he's running away from. And what he's trying to define himself as." He felt that the episode helped explain some of Darem's earlier behaviour, stating, "the reason why Darem has this sort of agenda and this sense of drive and purpose is because he’s been told that he’s going to be a king, and that is the truth; he is going to become the king of a whole planet, and that brings a momentum to life". Regarding Darem's relationship with Jay-Den, he noted, "Jay-Den is so powerful because of his stillness. It’s like he's rooted to the ground, I think, and that's just an admirable thing. I think that's a really admirable thing for Darem to witness, is someone standing still, confidently saying what they love, saying what they want, and saying what they believe. Because that's just such an absence of what Darem has had in his life. He's like an answer. He's an answer to a lot of empty space for Darem." Hawkins referred to Jay-Den as a "mirror" to Darem and noted that "he's the first person at the Academy to actually tell him the truth about who he is", and compared that to Darem's relationship with Kiara stating, "Kaira is probably the only person in his Khionian upbringing who has the same effect on Darem. I think both of those people are very sobering. And I think that's who Jay-Den plays. Jay-Den’s place in that role is obviously romantic. There's romantic interest there. But deeper than that, not just attraction, but the reason why these two people sort of get closer and closer, I think, is because they bring something out of each other, and that thing that they bring out is the truth. And I think that's what we're all searching for."

Discussing the episode's exploration of her character, Bella Shepard, who plays Genesis, stated, "This episode really uncovered so much about Genesis. I almost felt like I got to step outside of her a little bit and have a new perspective on her. I wasn’t given much to work with for the character as a whole when I first booked the project, so getting the script for episode 7, I was like, “Yes, finally.” Before that, it’s like I got little easter eggs about who she is and where she comes from." Shepard expressed that Genesis is primarily motivated by a fear of failure, noting that, "She thinks her value comes from her achievements, because that’s really what she’s known her whole life. So to have something other than achievements, which could be love or friendship, those don’t mean as much to her because she thinks that that’s not what people want from her or want to see from her. Her fear is really driven by not being who she thinks people want her to be." Regarding Genesis' deepening friendship with Caleb, Shepard explained, "I like to think of them as platonic soulmates in a way. They can finish each other’s sentences. I like to imagine them being on the same bridge one day and sharing a captain’s chair because they think so much alike, and they’re so good at problem-solving, and what one lacks, the other one makes up for. It makes a lot of sense to me why they feel so connected to each other." Of Genesis' personality, Shepard expressed, "her confidence is a defense mechanism, in a way. She uses her confidence to keep the group together and make her position at the school very distinctive" and felt that opening up to Caleb about her insecurities in the episode helped to strengthen their friendship.

== Release ==
"Ko'Zeine" was released on February 19, 2026, on Paramount+.

== Reception ==
Lacy Baugher of Den of Geek compared "Ko'Zeine" to "Vitus Reflux", the show's third episode for its use of mirroring plotlines, and gave the episode three stars out of five, noting that it "offers some much-needed insight into two of the show’s most underserved characters. But after a string of three truly excellent episodes, it’s jarring to settle for one that feels… just okay." She was critical of the time jump, remarking that it felt the show had "missed a step somewhere" by not showing the immediate aftermath of the previous episode. While Baugher was mixed on the Khionia storyline, specifically due to the fact that his intended marriage to Kiara was never mentioned previously, she praised the performances of Hawkins and Diané, writing, "Darem and Jay-Den’s scenes continue to crackle with the kind of chemistry that’s certain to be problematic when one of them has an alleged fiancé waiting to marry them and the other’s got a boyfriend back home. But once again, Karim Diané and George Hawkins are great together, as Jay-Den serves as Darem’s sounding board and cheerleader, stepping up to give a top-tier best man speech about the way that his classmate — and friend — not only helped him find his own voice, but has become a self-assured leader amongst their Academy crew." She also appreciated the exploration of Genesis; character, writing that, "maintaining her can-do, ready for anything, constantly striving image comes at a very real personal cost, and this is the first we’re really seeing of how her fear of failure has shaped her."

Writing for IGN, Scott Collura gave the episode a seven out of ten, writing that, "Starfleet Academy pumps the brakes a bit after last week’s big episode, focusing on two of the show’s friendships: Genesis and Caleb, and Darem and Jay-Den. Both stories give their characters some nice moments, but the former pair get stuck treading water with lightweight high jinks for a while while the latter get the more memorable part of the script. Regardless, all four actors continue their charm offensive in what is ultimately a sweet little episode". He noted that, while it could be seen as a bottle episode, it "plays off of some well-worn Trek tropes but also serves to further solidify how engaging this cast of young actors can be." He compared Darem's plotline to "Amok Time", an episode of Star Trek: The Original Series and felt this was the stronger storyline in the episode, writing, "The antics of Genesis and Caleb aren’t particularly interesting or funny in this episode, but the reveal of why Genesis returned to the Academy during the break and is willing to get into trouble is worth the wait. The outsized sense of responsibility that both she and Darem feel is a weight that each must contend with in “Ko'Zeine,” and that their friends help them through these situations is gratifying. Again, the Darem/Jay-Den portion of the episode works better, not just in holding the viewer's interest but also in terms of this thematic throughline."

Keith DeCandido also compared the episode to "Amok Time", as well as other Star Trek episodes "Sins of the Father", "Breaking the Ice", "Where Pleasant Fountains Lie", and "Favorite Son", writing that Darem's plotline helped the episode "feel exactly like a Star Trek show". He praised Brooks' performances as Kiara and concluded his review writing, "After the high-stakes drama of last week, we return this week to the more low-stakes drama of the difficulties of growing up and finding your place in the world, which is fine. This is a show about young people trying to find their place in the galaxy, and one of the show’s strengths is that they’re keeping it mostly low-stakes on a macrocosmic level, even if it's all quite important to the individual characters on a microcosmic level."
