= The Life of the Stars =

- Star Trek: Starfleet Academy episode
- Episode no.: Season 1 Episode 8
- Directed by: Andi Armaganian
- Written by: Jane Maggs; Gaia Violo
- Cinematography by: Philip Lanyon
- Editing by: Bartholomew Burcham; Ryan Cates
- Original release date: February 26, 2026
- Running time: 64 minutes

Guest appearances
- Romeo Carere as Ocam Sadal; Chiwetel Ejiofor as Maker; Mary Wiseman as Sylvia Tilly

Episode chronology
← Previous "Ko'Zeine"	Next → "300th Night"
- Star Trek: Starfleet Academy season 1

"The Life of the Stars" is the eighth episode of the first season of the American science fiction teen drama television series Star Trek: Starfleet Academy. The episode was written by Jane Maggs and series creator Gaia Violo, and directed by Andi Armaganian. Part of Alex Kurtzman's expanded Star Trek Universe, the series takes place in the 32nd century, the far-future time period that was introduced in Star Trek: Discovery and follows the first new class of Starfleet cadets in over a century as they come of age and train to be officers. The episode was released on Paramount+ on February 26, 2026. In the episode, the cadets continue to struggle with their experiences on the USS Miyazaki, causing Chancellor Ake (Holly Hunter) to call upon her old friend, Sylvia Tilly (Mary Wiseman) for assistance. Tilly helps them to process their feelings through an amateur reading of the Thornton Wilder play Our Town. Following damage sustained on the Miyazaki, Ake and The Doctor are forced to take SAM (Kerrice Brooks) back to her homeworld, and The Doctor has to confront his own past.

The episode received acclaim from critics, who praised the exploration of trauma through the use of Our Town, the return of Sylvia Tilly, and the character development of Tarima, and The Doctor.

== Plot ==
Tarima returns to San Francisco following a period of recovery on Betazed with a new inhibitor chip to better regulate her telepathic abilities, but is frustrated to learn that she is being forcibly transferred from the War College to Starfleet Academy. Chancellor Ake, realising that the cadets are still suffering following their experiences on the Miyazaki over one month prior, (Note: As depicted in "Come, Let's Away".) contacts Sylvia Tilly to help them process their trauma. Tilly does this by teaching a mandatory drama class, much to the chagrin of all of the cadets aside from SAM, who chooses Our Town as the play they will study after connecting with its themes of hopeful defiance. SAM, still suffering damage from the Miyazaki, glitches and is taken to The Doctor, who is unable to help her. Ake concludes that their only hope is to take SAM to her homeworld of Kasq and ask her Maker (Chiwetel Ejiofor) for help. On the way, The Doctor continues to rebuff SAM's attempts to connect, and discusses the hardships of immortal life with Ake. SAM's Maker runs a diagnostic on her and reveals that her experiences at the academy have overloaded her systems to a degree that cannot be repaired and decides to terminate her permanently.

At the academy, the cadets continue to resist Tilly's teachings, particularly Tarima, who lashes out at her and refuses to admit that there are any similarities between her experiences and the traumas experienced by Our Town's lead character Emily. Tilly eventually calls Tarima out, telling her that she has the power to move through her pain rather than pushing it away. Tarima later gets drunk, argues with Caleb (Sandro Rosta) and accuses Genesis (Bella Shepard) of trying to steal him from her. Genesis responds with kindness and empathy, and helps put her to bed. Concerned about SAM, the cadets, led by Ocam (Romeo Carere), complete a readthrough of the play, including Tarima, who hesitantly returns to the group.

On Kasq, The Doctor holds SAM's lifeless hand, apologising for refusing to do so when she was still alive, and confessing that he purposefully kept himself at a distance from her so that he could avoid experiences anymore loss after the death of his daughter Belle. (Note: As depicted in the Star Trek: Voyager episode "Real Life".) Ake then realizes that it wasn't the damage on the Miyazaki that caused SAM's glitches, but her inability to process trauma due to her lack of programming. Speaking to the Maker, she proposes that they re-make SAM, but this time as a child, allowing her to grow up and build resilience so she will be better equipped to deal with challenging experiences when she grows up. She also suggests that The Doctor remain on Kasq with her as a surrogate father, which he agrees to. He and SAM spend seventeen years of Kasq, the equivalent of two weeks on Earth, (Note: The Doctor encountered a similar planet in the Star Trek: Voyager episode "Blink of an Eye".) before returning to the academy, where the cadets have an emotional reunion with her.

== Production ==
=== Writing ===
The episode was written by Jane Maggs and series creator and executive producer Gaia Violo, marking the writing credit on the show for both.

Discussing Tilly's return and her development since her last appearance in Star Trek: Discovery's series finale, Mary Wiseman who portrays her stated, "I felt like she’s really settled into herself. In Discovery, I thought she was always battling some level of imposter syndrome being on the ship, and I didn’t detect that in the writing of this. And I love it that she really did find her place here and has found a deep comfort and confidence in being a teacher. It’s satisfying that she really has landed somewhere where she can feel like she belongs and use her skills effectively." Wiseman felt that Tilly had a "sense" that the cadets were building emotional walls to protect themselves from the events on the Miyazaki, and that she knew they needed to "face [the feelings] openly and with vulnerability" in order to move on, adding that, "in Tilly’s mind, [the play] is the perfect challenge to get them through this. And I think she models a kind of anti-coolness, an anti-toughness approach to processing really difficult emotions." Regarding her relationship with Tarima, Wiseman felt that Tilly had to alter her strategy in order to get through to her, explaining that, "Tilly tends to lead with a lot of softness. She does not mind making herself the fool, but I think she’s got a strong emotional intelligence and can sense that Tarima wants to shut down. So what Tilly senses in that moment is that she has to push and needle her to elicit these big feelings so that Tarima can actually deal with them. And once those feelings are up and out, then the softness comes and the empathy and the shared vulnerability." Coincidentally, Wiseman had previously played the character of Emily in a production of Our Town while studying as Juilliard, and expressed that the play had meant a lot to her, causing her to cry when the show's producers revealed the details of the episode to her.

Series showrunner Noga Landau stated that they had to "court the Thornton Wilder estate" to get the rights to use Our Town in the episode and that, once they had clearance, writers Violo and Maggs spent time researching the different ways the play had been depicted onscreen, and used this to adapt into SAM's storyline. Of this, Violo explained, "it was very important to us to give SAM a choice about what she wanted from her death and life. "She was sent from Kasq to the academy as an emissary, but that was out of her control. And she also hadn't been programmed with the ability to process a trauma like the one that happened to her in Episode 6. So giving her a choice became the throughline of the entire episode. From the beginning, she knows she wants to live and the Kasqians have to figure out a way to make that happen. And then the Doctor ultimately steps up and helps her through her journey. If you view Sam's journey through the lens of Our Town, it's about enjoying life every minute and that's the creative lens through which we broke the story." Landau added that the series would explore more of the impact of SAM's death and rebirth, and the impact it has on her, during the show's second season.

Violo explained that The Doctor's story in the episode had been planned out "from the beginning" and that she and Maggs wanted to honor "Real Life" and bring things "full circle". She noted, "the idea of The Doctor having lived 800 years, for so long, and the experience of loss, and what that means for someone that experienced life — I like to think of it — like a flowing river. It is just constant, and what that means for him. That was always there from the beginning. And the idea that there was just one other holographic student there who was looking at him for that level of mentorship and his inability to connect, because it is too painful when you’re living life again as a flowing river and everybody’s passing you by and you’re still there. That was always intriguing."

== Release ==
"The Life of the Stars" was released on February 26, 2026, on Paramount+.

== Reception ==
The episode received a positive critical reception. Lacy Braugher of Den of Geek gave it five stars out of five, describing it as "an emotionally complicated hour about healing and growth in many forms" and declaring it "one of the series' most lyrical and moving episodes yet". She felt it was an improvement over the previous episode, "Ko'Zeine", in terms of following up on the events of "Come, Let's Away", and praised the return of Wiseman as Sylvia Tilly, and the parallels between Our Town and the events of the episode. Ton conclude her review, Braugher wrote, "“The Lives of the Stars” is an episode that works on multiple levels: Yes, it's the story of a group of college kids putting on a play. It's also the story of an ancient hologram opening his heart again, building an entirely new and different life to save a young woman he was afraid to admit he cared about. But it's also a story of making meaning in a large and frightening world."

Keith DiCandido of Reactor praised the episode's exploration of trauma, writing, "there’s a lot that’s impressive about this episode—which finally brings in Mary Wiseman’s Tilly, who was originally promised to be a recurring character, but who is apparently only in this one episode this season—but perhaps the thing that impressed me most was that it used the Thorton Wilder play Our Town, a play I have always despised with every fibre of my being, and in the end I actually liked the use of it. The thing that impressed me the second-most was that it wasn’t just the trauma of the events of “Come, Let’s Away” being dealt with here, as the EMH gets himself a story arc that deals with the Doctor's own centuries-old trauma." He lauded Steiner's performance as Tarima, stating, "Zoë Steiner does superlative work, as Tarima is so very brittle here, as she may have recovered physically, but the psychological recovery still has a long way to go. When she first arrives, she makes almost no eye contact with anyone, and is holding herself so tightly you fear she’s going to break in half" and Picardo's performance as The Doctor, writing, "I loved how absolutely goddamned brilliantly Robert Picardo played the EMH’s emotional struggles".

Scott Collura of IGN gave the episode a seven out of ten and wrote, "the latest episode of Starfleet Academy has some big theater-kid energy, which is appropriate since one of its main focuses is the opera-loving Robert Picardo character The Doctor. That it also features the return of Mary Wiseman as Discovery’s Lt. Tilly and is concerned with both Tarima and Sam’s ongoing difficulties means that “The Life of the Stars” is another episode of the show that has almost too much going on, but the writers and director Andi Armaganian manage to find a balance to everything that is ultimately gratifying and effective." He praised the character development of The Doctor and Picardo's performance, declaring that "Picardo nails The Doctor’s inner turmoil" during his emotional heart-to-heart with SAM, and appreciated exploring the character further and referencing his experiences during "Real Life".
