= Vox in Excelso =

- Star Trek: Starfleet Academy episode
- Episode no.: Season 1 Episode 4
- Directed by: Doug Aarniokoski
- Written by: Eric Anthony Glover; Gaia Volo
- Cinematography by: Philip Lanyon
- Original release date: January 29, 2026
- Running time: 63 minutes

Guest appearances
- Rebecca Quin as Mackenzie Ya; Ken Barnett as Hayden Thriss; Martin Roach as Drekol; David Keeley as Obel Wochak; Dorothy Atabong as L’Vanna; Tremaine Nelson as Thar; Sean Jones as Enok; Nicole Dickinson as Astrid Atlee; Michael Brown as Thelonious Dandrid; Avaah Blackwell as Haile; Joseph Chiu as Weldu; Joseph Messina as Holloway; Layina Chand as Kohli; Arthur Ortiz as FNN Reporter; Rekha Shankar as DoT

Episode chronology
← Previous "Vitus Reflux"	Next → "Series Acclimation Mil"
- Star Trek: Starfleet Academy season 1

"Vox in Excelso" is the fourth episode of the first season of the American science fiction teen drama television series Star Trek: Starfleet Academy. The episode was written by Eric Anthony Glover and series creator Gaia Violo, and directed by Doug Aarniokoski. Part of Alex Kurtzman's expanded Star Trek Universe, the series takes place in the 32nd century, the far-future time period that was introduced in Star Trek: Discovery and follows the first new class of Starfleet cadets in over a century as they come of age and train to be officers. The episode was released on Paramount+ on January 29, 2026. In the episode, Klingon cadet Jay-Den Kraag is forced to confront his strained relationship with his family and identity when the future of his species is placed under threat following a catastrophic disaster.

“Vox in Excelso” received positive reviews from critics, who praised the stakes, exploration of Klingon culture, and the performances, particularly that of Karim Diané as Jay-Den.

== Plot ==
During the USS Athena’s first spaceflight of the school year, The Doctor (Robert Picardo) teaches the cadets about the power of debate. While Caleb (Sandro Rosta) is a natural, Jay-Den (Karim Diané) expresses his anxiety around public speaking. Captain Ake (Holly Hunter) and Lura (Gina Yashere) call Jay-Den into a meeting, and inform him that a Klingon ship carrying a large quantity of the remaining members of the remaining eight Houses has crashed, putting the species on the brink of extinction. (Note: It is explained that, following the cataclysmic event a century ago known as The Burn, the Klingon homeworld of Qo'noS was rendered uninhabitable, leaving the species as intersellar refugees.) Despite being unable to confirm whether his family are still alive, Jay-Den chooses to return to his classes and pushes The Doctor to allow the subject of the debate competition to be the Klingon diaspora.

Flashbacks detail Jay-Den’s life as a refugee on Krios Prime. (Note: Previously established as a Klingon colony in "The Mind's Eye", an episode of the fourth season of Star Trek: The Next Generation.) While his reluctance to kill strains his relationship with his parents, particularly his father Dekol. His brother Thar, recognizes that Jay-Den has a different path to walk, and gifts him a salvaged Starfleet recruitment beacon. When Thar is poisoned trying to trade for more forbidden Starfleet tech, Dekol refuses to allow Jay-Den to use the technology to heal him, and he dies from his wounds after encouraging his brother to believe in himself and “trust the stars”. Dekol takes Jay-Den on a ritual hunt, but he refuses the kill, enraging his father who misses his own shot at their prey, storms off and destroys the beacon. The family then abandon him on Krios Prime, leading him to join Starfleet Academy.

Discussing the Klingon emergency, Admiral Vance (Oded Fehr) tells Ake that the Federation have identified a new planet, Faan Alpha, for the remaining refugees to settle on, and suggests contacting her old flame, Klingon General Wochak, who may be able to convince the proud species of accepting their help. Wochak rejects Ake's proposal, stating that Klingon tradition will not permit them to accept charity, but he agrees to look into whether Jay-Den's family survived the crash.

Jay-Den rejects Caleb's offer to team up for the debate, insisting that he will be arguing that Starfleet should stay out of Klingon affairs, and they fight. Darem (George Hawkins) later visits Jay-Den's quarters and teaches him some Khionian breathing techniques for his anxiety, but leaves suddenly when they begin to get close to one another. Things get personal during Caleb and Jay-Den's debate, and The Doctor shuts it down. Lura visits Jay-Den, sharing her own experiences as a part-Klingon, and telling him that his father purposefully missed his shot during their hunt in order to set him free. Returning to the debate, Jay-Den states that the Federation should be seeking a Klingon solution to a Klingon problem rather than trying to impose their own ideas for the species’ survival.

On Jay-Den's advice, Ake and Vance take the Athena to Faan Alpha and inform Wochak that all Klingon ships in the sector are now enemies of the Federation, and a brief battle commences with both sides intentionally missing or only inflicting minor hits. With no casualties or serious damage to any vessels, Vance surrenders to Wochak, who claims Faan Alpha as a spoil of war, allowing the Klingons to settle there while retaining their honor. Wochak later informs Jay-Den that his family are safely on Faan Alpha, and gives him a warrior's bow to honor Jay-Den for his strategy. Caleb and Jay-Den reconcile, with the former repairing the broken beacon, and they share stories of their families.

== Production ==
Three ships featured in the Klingon fleet during the episode's battle scenes, the Ketha Recon Raptor, M’Chla Bird of Prey Refit, and the QeHpu’ Advanced Light Battlecruiser, first appeared in the 2010 massively multiplayer online role-playing game Star Trek Online. Of this, the game's art director stated Thomas Marrone, “We are grateful to our partners at Paramount for allowing us to make a marked contribution on the franchise we love so much, and, as always, we are grateful to the amazing community of players who have made Star Trek Online’s ships a mainstay in the zeitgeist of the fandom over the years.” Ships from the game also previously made an appearance in the second season of Star Trek: Picard.

=== Writing ===
The episode was written by Eric Anthony Glover and series creator Gaia Violo, marking Glover's first writing credit and Violo's second.

Of Jay-Den's journey in the episode, Karim Diané who portrays him stated, "the journey that Jay-Den goes on in this episode is all about finding his voice. And it was the journey I was going on, too, literally finding his voice. How much emotion can I give that voice? And I think you’ll continue to see him and I develop our voice, both sonically and also, emotionally." Discussing Jay-Den's atypical personality compared to the other Klingons featured in the franchise, Diané felt that it was important to strike a balance between showing fans something new, while still making the character feel connected to the kind of Klingon they were familiar with. Diané stated that he credits the episode's director, Doug Aarniokoski, for helping him find the character, and looked to Michael Dorn’s performance as Worf in Star Trek: The Next Generation and Star Trek: Deep Space Nine to know what the standard was for a Klingon, while also tapping into his own innate sensitivity. Of the character finding and accepting his own form of strength, Diané stated, “This message is so important to me because, again, I’m not a warrior, I hate sports. I hate fighting. I’m not into any of those things. And for so long, people have tried to make me that. So it’s really exciting for me to be [part of this episode] because it really shows that you don’t have to be that. You don’t have to pick up a weapon. You don’t have to pick up a spear. But you can still impact and change an entire world with your voice and your energy. That message is really, really important to me.” He also added that the events of the episode give Jay-Den a new sense of self-assuredness that will continue throughout the rest of the season.

Regarding the fate of the Klingon species in the series, showrunner Noga Landau explained, “We are big Klingon fans in the Starfleet Academy writers’ room. And we obsessed about every detail with the Klingons, even down to the warrior stew. We just wanted everything to be perfect. And honestly, the question we asked ourselves was, what haven't we done with the Klingons yet in Star Trek? What is a new story? What thrusts this mighty empire of warriors into a very new situation that sheds light on who they are to their core?” She stated that the episode was intended to show the “power” of the Klingons as people living as refugees, and felt it was a “universal story” due to the large number of refugees in modern society, expressing that “It was important that everyone who watches this episode sees themselves in the story of the Klingons. Because it’s about strength and it’s about never letting go of who you are.”

== Release ==
"Vox in Excelso" was released on January 29, 2026, on Paramount+.

== Reception ==
The episode received positive reception from critics.

Lacy Baugher of Den of Geek gave the episode four stars out of five and felt that "Vox in Excelso" was the strongest episode of the series to date, stating that the show "finally finds something that feels like solid ground in “Vox in Excelso”. An hour that deftly connects to the world of Star Trek's past and hints at the promise of its future, the episode is one part character study, one part post-Burn lore dump, and one ode to the power of friendship. In short, exactly the kind of story this show is uniquely equipped to be telling and, hopefully, a sign of where it's heading in the weeks to come." She praised the scene between Jay-Den and Darem, highlighting the latter's character growth and vulnerability, as "both unexpected and strangely meaninful", and felt there was "intriguing" chemistry between Diané and Hawkins, as well as the "surprisingly warm pep talk" between Jay-Den and Lura. She noted that the ruse to allow the Klingons to claim the planet at the end of the episode was "laughably thin" but enjoyed the overall exploration of Klingon society culture in the 32nd century and praised the episode's more grounded story compared to the previous episode "Vitus Reflux", noting that it "has a more direct real-world application than that weird laser tag game from last week".

Writing for IGN, Scott Collura lauded the Klingon lore reveals and the deepening of Jay-Den's character and the development of his friendship with Caleb, and the performances of Hunter and Keeley as Ake and Worchok, but similarly felt the central dilemma was resolved too easily. He enjoyed Diané's portrayal of an atypical Klingon, positively comparing him to Dorn's Worf, and praised the performances of both Diané and Rosta as Caleb, in addition to director Aarniokoski's handling of the flashback scenes that are interspersed throughout the episode.

Keith Decandido of Reactor expressed his relief that the franchise was finally revealing the fate of the Klingons in the 32nd century, noting their prominence in the early seasons of Star Trek: Discovery before never being mentioned again following the show's time jump. He praised Hunter and Keeley's chemistry together, declaring the pair's interactions as "magnificent" and "particularly entertaining" and the episode's depiction of Klingons as resilient refugees. He concluded his review writing, "one of the hallmarks of Star Trek has always been that the compassionate solution is preferred to the violent one. This is a lovely example of a solution that is both violent and compassionate—fitting for a story about Klingons, truly—and still embodying the hope for a better future that has been baked into Star Trek since the beginning." Diana Keng of TV Fanatic gave the episode 4 1/2 stars out of five, particularly lauding the political elements of the episode, writing that "Trek exists to mirror society and question accepted norms. Seeing non-Klingons debate and propose paths for the future of the Klingon diaspora in cold, calculated terms strikes close to home in our current climate of invasion and occupation." She similarly enjoyed the scenes between Ake and Wochak, expressing that "their clandestine, yet sanctioned, assignation provides us with yet another facet of Ake’s personality. Impish and flirty, she delights in Wocak’s company even as she despairs at convincing him to accept the Federation’s offer."

Richard Edwards of Space also celebrated the exploration of the Klingons, calling the episode's developments "the biggest thing to happen to the Klingons" in some time, and praised the "nuanced" take on the species. He lauded Diané's performance as Jay-Den, writing that "Jay-Den Kraag (Karim Diané) had already established himself as one of the standouts in "Starfleet Academy"'s new ensemble, and an intriguing counterpart to our previous experience of his species — that rare Klingon who wants to be a doctor. But this episode also proves that he's as much a warrior as any of his brethren, using his newly discovered debating smarts to come up with a "Klingon solution to a Klingon problem", and felt his plan to instigate a fake war for Faan Alpha was an "ingenious piece of diplomacy".

In a review giving the episode an eight out of ten, Michael Rosch of AIPT praised the writing, feeling it was an improvement on the series' second episode "Beta Test" which covered a similar topic, Diané's performance, which he felt "elevated" the "strong character work" done by the writers, and the episode's commentary on real-world issues. He wrote that "Vox in Excelso" is "a great character piece that defines Jay-Den as "a warrior not with weapons but with words." Further, "Vox in Excelso" demonstrates how this next generation, with their own unique perspectives, are capable of improving on The Federation of the past. It brilliantly demonstrates how to effectively use this academy setting and this distinct, post-Burn moment to tell a true Star Trek story that boldly challenges the audience to reimagine a future that surpasses the limited imaginations of 1960s, 70s, 80s, 90s, and 2010s writers."
