= Beta Test (Star Trek: Starfleet Academy) =

- Star Trek: Starfleet Academy episode
- Episode no.: Season 1 Episode 2
- Directed by: Alex Kurtzman
- Written by: Noga Landau; Jane Maggs
- Cinematography by: Tommy Maddox-Upshaw
- Editing by: Jon Dudkowski
- Original release date: January 15, 2026
- Running time: 61 minutes

Guest appearances
- Raoul Bhaneja as Commander Kelrec; Anthony Natale as President Emerin Sadal; Jamie Groote as The Diva; Romeo Carere as Ocam Sadal; Cecilia Lee as Dzolo; Tabitha Tao as Holo-guide; Scott Ryan Yamamura as Tinn Valaak; Marcia Adolphe as Interpreter; Piotr Michael as Sadal's voice chip; Kether Donohue as Almond Basket; Joseph Messina as Holloway; Raffa Virago as Pickford; Graham Nox as Oren; Katie Nora Ready-Walters as Terrified cadet

Episode chronology
| ← Previous "Kids These Days" | Next → "Vitus Reflux" |
- Star Trek: Starfleet Academy season 1

"Beta Test" is the second episode of the first season of the American science fiction teen drama television series Star Trek: Starfleet Academy. The episode was written by showrunner Noga Landau and Jane Maggs, and directed by executive producer Alex Kurtzman. Part of Kurtzman's expanded Star Trek Universe, the series takes place in the 32nd century, the far-future time period that was introduced in Star Trek: Discovery and follows the first new class of Starfleet cadets in over a century as they come of age and train to be officers.

The episode was released on Paramount+ on January 15, 2026, alongside the pilot episode "Kids These Days". In the episode, the academic year begins as Caleb remains unsure about his future at Starfleet Academy but, when a delegation from Betazed, a former Federation member, arrives and Caleb is tasked with showing their leader's daughter around campus, he must put his uncertainty aside in order to ensure negotiations are successful.

== Plot ==
As the fall semester commences and the cadets begin their classes, Chancellor Ake (Holly Hunter) advises them to focus on what unites rather than divides them, all while she struggles to navigate the uneasy coexistence between Starfleet Academy and the War College, a military-oriented school that kept running during The Burn led by the straight-laced Commander Kelrec. Caleb (Sandro Rosta) remains focused on finding his mother, digging into Nus Braka's claim that she was on Goja V. (Note: Braka told Caleb this during their confrontation in "Kids These Days".) Admiral Vance (Oded Fehr) informs Ake and Kelrec that the campus will be hosting a delegation from Betazed, a former member of the United Federation of Planets who left and became an isolationist species behind an impenetrable psionic wall during The Burn. Ake argues that having the cadets in attendance during negotiations will increase the chances of the Betazoids re-joining the Federation, though President Sadal of Betazed is resistant to Vance's offers during initial negotiations.

After a public dressing down from temporal mechanics tutor Jett Reno (Tig Notaro) and an incident with a mucus creature caused by SAM (Kerric Brooks), Caleb attempts to flee the academy, but is interrupted by Tarima (Zoë Steiner), the President's daughter, who requests a tour of the campus from him, allowing the two to grow closer. Caleb uses this as a way to force Ake to allow him access to the academy's stellar cartography lab, but is unable to find any records of Goja V until Tarima grants him access to Betazed star charts, revealing that the planet is behind their psionic wall. During the reception gala later that day, Tarima accuses Caleb of only using her to gain information, and the negotiations fall apart completely, causing President Sadal to announce that he and his delegation are leaving imminently.

Commiserating with Caleb on their mutual failures, Ake has him apologize to Tarima and convince her father to return to the negotiations, where she proposes that the Federation build its new seat of power on Betazed as a show of intent to usher in a new era. Sadal agrees, and the Betazoids officially re-join the Federation. Ake later tells Caleb to use Starfleet channels to confirm that his mother's name appears on a flight manifest leaving Goja V, giving them a lead on where to find her. Tarima chooses to join the War College, while her brother Orem joins the academy and is placed in a room with Darem (George Hawkins), and Caleb, much to the latter's dismay.

== Production ==
=== Writing ===
The episode was written by series showrunner and executive producer Noga Landau, and writer Jane Maggs, marking the first writing credit on the show for both women.

"Beta Test" introduces the character of Tarima Sadal, portrayed by Zoë Steiner, the first Betazoid main character in a Star Trek show since Deanna Troi (Marina Sirtis), who debuted in Star Trek: The Next Generation. Steiner felt this was "a privilege" and "very exciting", and shared that she watched Sirtis' "iconic" performance to help prepare for the role stating, "it felt like an obligation, in a good way, to make sure I knew what had been established in the canon, what a Betazoid is capable of, how they show up, how they interact. But at the same time, we've said I wanted to also not feel restricted by that and make sure I brought myself to the role and brought myself to Tarima."

=== Music ===
In a scene during the reception gala for the visiting Betazoid delegation, The Doctor, portrayed by Robert Picardo and The Diva, portrayed by Jamie Groote, an actress from the Canadian Opera Company, perform the "Papageno and Papegana Duet" from Wolfgang Amadeus Mozart's 1791 opera The Magic Flute, and "Jetzt, Schätzchen, jetzt sind wir allein" from Ludwig van Beethoven's 1805 opera Fidelio. Picardo noted in an interview with Den of Geek that The Doctor's love of singing opera was a character quirk that was created by accident during his time on Star Trek: Voyager when one of the producers misheard him suggesting that he should listen to opera. Of his performance in "Beta Test", Picardo expressed, "to perform again, and to sing with this wonderful actress from the Canadian Opera Company, [Jamie Groote], was great fun and a challenge and scary because I want to be good enough that I sound passable. I’m singing with a professional opera singer!".

== Release ==
"Beta Test" was released on January 15, 2026, on Paramount+ alongside "Kids These Days", the series premiere.

== Reception ==
In a positive review, Scott Collura of IGN wrote, "I was glad to see that right off the bat we were given a more grounded (literally) episode that is set entirely in San Francisco at the Academy and delves into the day-to-day lives of our cadets. Sure, there’s a major, galaxy-affecting summit meeting with the representatives of Betazed also taking place, but that’s pretty classic Next Generation-style A/B/C-plot storytelling". He also praised the pairing of Caleb and Tarima, and the suggestion that the series will be picking up some loose plot threads related to The Burn that were not answered in Star Trek: Discovery.

Writing for Screen Rant, John Orquiola called the episode "terrific and engaging", feeling it "deepened both the characters' relationships and Star Trek lore.". Michael Rosch of AIPT gave the episode a 7.5 out of 10, and similarly praised the episode's writing and cohesive story, feeling it was superior to the previous episode in these areas and "What Is Starfleet?", an episode of Star Trek: Strange New Worlds that also focused on reconciling with Starfleet's military side. While he referred to the foreshadowing of the romance between Caleb and Tarima as "soapy teen drama that will likely circle this spinoff", he declared that "the moments I loved were those that celebrated the importance of youth movements", and praised the ending for challenging long-time fans of the franchise by moving the Federation's capital, declaring that "the writers are making a statement" and stating that "choosing Betazed, a world ignored by the franchise for decades, sends a message that our culture may no longer be the hegemonic one going forward. I find that prospect exciting, and I dare say it suggests we may finally be BOLDLY going where no Star Trek has gone before."

Anthony Pascale of TrekMovie.com wrote, "a solid (albeit somewhat mixed) follow up episode lacks the punch of the impressive series opener, but still keeps the momentum going enough as it begins to explore some of the characters and dynamics of this new series. Much potential can be seen as the series begins to explore more Star Trek themes, but signs of balancing that with some lesser YA tendencies shows potential pitfalls for this series full of dualities."
