= Come, Let's Away =

- Star Trek: Starfleet Academy episode
- Episode no.: Season 1 Episode 6
- Directed by: Larry Teng
- Written by: Kenneth Lin; Kiley Rossetter
- Original release date: February 12, 2026
- Running time: 62 minutes

Guest appearances
- Paul Giamatti as Nus Braka; Raoul Bhaneja as Commander Kelrec; Romeo Carera as Ocam Sadal; Alexander Eiling as B'avi; Dale Whibley as Kyle Jokovic; Raffa Virago as Pickford; Jeff Teravainen as Tomov; Stephen Adekolu as N'Duwo Skra; Daniel Fernandes as Med Tech

Episode chronology
| ← Previous "Series Acclimation Mil" | Next → "Ko'Zeine" |
- Star Trek: Starfleet Academy season 1

"Come, Let's Away" is the sixth episode of the first season of the American science fiction teen drama television series Star Trek: Starfleet Academy. The episode was written by Kenneth Lin and Kiley Rossetter, and directed by Larry Teng. Part of Alex Kurtzman's expanded Star Trek Universe, the series takes place in the 32nd century, the far-future time period that was introduced in Star Trek: Discovery and follows the first new class of Starfleet cadets in over a century as they come of age and train to be officers. The episode was released on Paramount+ on February 12, 2026. In the episode, the cadets from Starfleet Academy and the War College undertake a joint training exercise on an derelict ship, only for things to go awry when a dangerous new enemy takes them hostage. Out of options, Captain Ake is forced to turn to her old enemy, Nus Braka, for help.

The episode received a positive critical reception for its tone, emotional stakes, and performances, particularly those of Holly Hunter as Ake, Paul Giamatti as Braka, and Zoë Steiner as Tarima.

== Plot ==
As their relationship progresses, Tarima (Zoë Steiner) inadvertently finds out the truth about Caleb's (Sandro Rosta) mother using her telepathic powers, leading to a fight between the two. Ake (Holly Hunter) and Kelrec (Raoul Bhaneja) inform the cadets of Starfleet Academy and the War College that they will be completing a training exercise together to improve their effectiveness when responding to crises. One team, consisting of Caleb, SAM (Kerrice Brooks), Jay-Den (Karim Diané), B'Avi (Alexander Eiling), and Kyle (Dale Whibley), are sent to the derelict USS Miyazaki in order to successfully re-power the ship, while another team including Genesis (Bella Shepard) and Darem (George Hawkins) remain on the bridge of the USS Athena to support. Despite their rivalry, B'Avi is impressed when Caleb restores life support using programmable matter. A cloaked ship then reveals itself, and a group of furies, cannibalistic scavengers and alien/human hybrids, board the Miyazaki and demand a ransom from the Federation for the return of the cadets.

Ake and Kelrec meet with Admiral Vance (Oded Fehr), who explains that the furies have a reputation for killing their hostages even after their demands are met, adding that that pirate Nus Braka successfully drove them away from his smuggling operation using a specialised weapon and suggests potentially contacting him for help. Ake dismisses this due to her history with Braka, but reluctantly meets with him after Tomov, the lieutenant sent to oversee the training mission, is ejected from the Miyazaki's airlock by the furies. A cocky Braka makes a list of outrageous demands in exchange for his help, and taunts Ake about the death of her son. Ake withstands his mockery, later telling her crew that she gleaned from him that the furies continue to be a problem for him and that she can use this to strongarm him into helping rescue the cadets. Braka tells her that he used a sonic weapon against the furies, and Vance suggests modifying the nearby USS Sargasso to emit a pulse that will disrupt them for long enough that the cadets can be transported back to the Athena. On the Miyazaki, SAM is able to reactivate the ship's computer, and the cadets barricade themselves on the bridge. Genesis and Lura (Gina Yashere) pilot a probe and are able to successfully locate the cloaked fury ship. Tarima and Ocam (Romeo Carera) reveal to Ake and Kelrec that Tarima has an implant to restrict her powers but that, she may be able to push past this and get a message to Caleb on the Miyazaki thanks to their emotional connection.

The Sargasso arrives but, before it can power up the sonic weapon, it is disabled in a surprise attack by a Venari Ral ship, and Ake realises that the furies are working with Braka, who had them attack the Miyazaki in an elaborate trap to get revenge on her and Starfleet. Tarima rips out her implant in order to unleash a telepathic attack to save the cadets on the Miyazaki, but B'Avi is killed protecting Caleb. The disruption allows Lura to transport the cadets back to the Athena, where the War College hold a funeral for B'Avi, and The Doctor places Tarima in a medically-induced coma after the mental strain of using her powers placed her in critical condition. Vance informs Ake that Braka and the Venari Ral immediately ransacked the space station being protected by the Sargasso as soon as it left, killing many Starfleet personnel and escaping with the base's experimental weapons. Braka then sends a message to Ake, tormenting her over what happened.

== Production ==
=== Writing ===
The episode was written by consulting producer Kenneth Lin and Kiley Rossetter, marking the first writing credit on the show for Lin, and the second for Roessetter, who co-wrote the third episode "Vitus Reflux". Explaining the change in tone from previous episodes, showrunner Alex Kurtzman stated, "We all felt it was important to turn this show on its head so that suddenly, the cadets realized the world they were stepping into had real stakes, that joining Starfleet isn’t just about being in a classroom. It’s all been fun and games up until now, but this job is actually really scary and really hard. The point [of the episode] was to honor the truth of what it means to be a cadet or an officer in Starfleet Academy".

Discussing the impact of the episode on Tarima, Zoë Steiner who portrays her stated, "This was a huge episode for me, and it was such a gift as an actor to go to that depth emotionally. I think, for Tarima, we really see in [this episode] her reckoning with and coming to terms with her power. We can obviously talk about Betazoids and their sensitivity, and their empathic abilities. But I think that sometimes [we] forget about what that means in terms of how much power is truly within her. And we see her really coming to terms with that, and being able to see her sensitivity as a strength, even like a superpower rather than a weakness." Steiner felt that Tarima choosing to rip out her inhibitor was especially important for her development noting that, "things that we do, or behaviors [we] engage in that serve their purpose for a while, and then they don’t anymore. On the contrary, they might even be holding us back. And in that scene, she knew what she had to do; that inhibitor had to come off to get access to the sheer amount of power that was required. That protective mechanism had to go." Commenting on Caleb and Tarima's relationship, Sandro Rosta, who plays Caleb explained, "Caleb has had to be so guarded his whole life, but [Tarima] just bypasses all the boundaries he’s had to set up without even trying. She has so much capacity to understand him and can kind of feel and sense everything going on inside [him]. And she does that from day one. So there’s a huge amount of release that he gets emotionally, and a huge amount of safety that he feels when he’s around her. And I think that’s something that’s very new to him." Steiner added that Tarima sees Caleb as someone who opens up "a whole new world of possibilities" for her and who represents "freedom", in contrast to her restrictive childhood. Rosta stated that the revelation of the true extent of Tarima's power would "knock him off his center" throughout the rest of the season, but noted that the show wouldn't "shy away from the complicated emotions that come up within him". Of Tarima's future without her inhibitor, Steiner explained, "I think she has a lot of shame about her abilities, and there is some fallout after what happens in episode six. And it’s just great. It’s just wonderful writing to explore that and see her navigate the shame and come out the other side".

Regarding Ake and Braka's confrontations in this episode, Paul Giamatti felt that the change in dynamic was "exciting", and praised the writing and credited Holly Hunter with adding new emotional layers. Hunter added that she felt it was important for Ake to be "really, truly, truly, truly be double-crossed" by Braka. Discussing the loss of Ake's son and how this has influenced her willingness to sacrifice her pride for Caleb and the other cadets, Holly Hunter explained, "I think she makes a mistake that she can't live with. The Federation is a severe outfit at the beginning of this show. At the beginning of Starfleet Academy, they are still recovering from The Burn and from some of the restrictions that they instilled after The Burn. But nevertheless, I think Nahla really takes some of those steps that she was responsible for when she quits. And I think that child, she feels compelled to make that right, as mysterious as that is to search the galaxy for a person who is orphaned, possibly. I love the mysticalness of that, and I love that there was something deeply mysterious about that search." Hunter and Giamatti teased that Braka would return at the end of the season with "a grand gesture" following his successful double-cross of Ake.

== Release ==
"Come, Let's Away" was released on February 12, 2026, on Paramount+.

== Reception ==
The episode received a generally positive reception from critics. Lacy Baugher of Den of Geek gave the episode 4 and a half stars out of five, praising the surprises, heightened stakes, and balancing of the series' cadet-focused plots with larger Federation-level catastrophes. She lauded the character development of Tarima, declaring the episode "an emotional coming-of-age tale", that " this is Tarima’s episode through and through" and said that Steiner's performance, "walks a fine line between softness and steel, and there’s something deeply gratifying about the way Tarima refuses to make herself smaller in order to win Caleb’s approval or affection. In fact, if anything, this whole episode is about this character finally deciding to unleash her true self". Baugher enjoyed the tone and atmosphere of the episode, writing that, "the poor lighting and overall ship-graveyard vibes give everything a sort of thinly veiled horror feel, which is only exacerbated by the arrival of a particularly violent and frightening new alien species, known as the Furies." She lauded the performances of Hunter and Giamatti, stating that the actors "are dynamite together and make what is, admittedly, a fairly thinly drawn vendetta feel incredibly compelling. The two play these characters as though they have the complex, established history of Professor X and Magneto, rather than the fairly shallow and poorly sketched revenge plot they’ve shared to date. Giamatti’s gleeful cruelty and harsh truths — he gets downright nasty about Ake’s son’s death and the emotional compromises required of any being forced to live on a long enough timeline — strike with painful precision, and though Hunter keeps Ake stoic and grounded enough that her breakdown at episode’s end lands all the harder."

Daniel Bibby of Winter Is Coming particularly praised the revelations about Ake's past, writing that "Hunter's performance and Ake's intriguing off-screen past immediately had me hooked. Frustratingly, many of the questions I've had about her origin story have remained unanswered since the first episode of the show's inaugural season. Then, Episode 6 came with a long-awaited exposition dump — and I mean that in the best possible way." He enjoyed Hunter's physicality in the role, noting how it has differed from Ake's movements in previous episodes of the season to reflect the higher stakes. Keith DiCandido of Reactor similarly praised Hunter, as well as Giamatti and Oded Fehr, writing that, "every moment that Paul Giamatti is onscreen shines, especially because in every scene, he’s sharing a room with Holly Hunter and/or Oded Fehr. Even if the other parts of the episode were terrible (they aren’t), just being able to watch these three interact, and then later watching Giamatti and Hunter interact, is magical. Absolutely great stuff, with the constant negotiating, the banter, the give-and-take, the snark, and the hidden meanings. All three characters are smart, all three characters are not easily misled, but two of them are hamstrung by ethics—something Braka points out rather snidely. Fehr is the voice of reason and compromise, as befits his position, even though he knows that Braka’s a piece of slime. Hunter plays things uncharacteristically close to the vest, not willing to give a millimeter to Braka. And Giamatti once against magnificently chews every micron of scenery, as Braka is in the driver’s seat, and he knows it." DiCandido did note that his only serious problem with the episode was the "tiresome inevitability of Tomov's death", referring to him as a "total redshirt".

Diana Kreng of TV Fanatic was mixed on Caleb and Tarima's dynamic at the beginning of the episode, writing that "these are the Star Trek: 90210 moments I was hoping we wouldn’t have to sit through", but praised the furies as antagonists, the episode's stakes, and Giamatti's performance as Braka writing, "Paul Giamatti plays Braka with more nuance than in our first encounter with him. No origami chicken tirades, just a calculated cat-and-mouse gloating performance."

In a mixed review, Scott Collura of IGN gave the episode a six out of ten and wrote, "“Come, Let's Away” phasers itself in the foot by trying to do too much in one episode, and as a result it under-services one of its storylines. But while the Ake/Braka portion grinds the episode to a halt, it at least does seem to be setting up a bigger confrontation for later in the season. Still, where this episode does work is in its continued evolution of Caleb and Tarima’s relationship, and particularly the latter’s troubled Betazoid past. Plus, the “trapped on a dead ship” storyline is pretty fun!"
