= Cirroc Lofton =

American actor

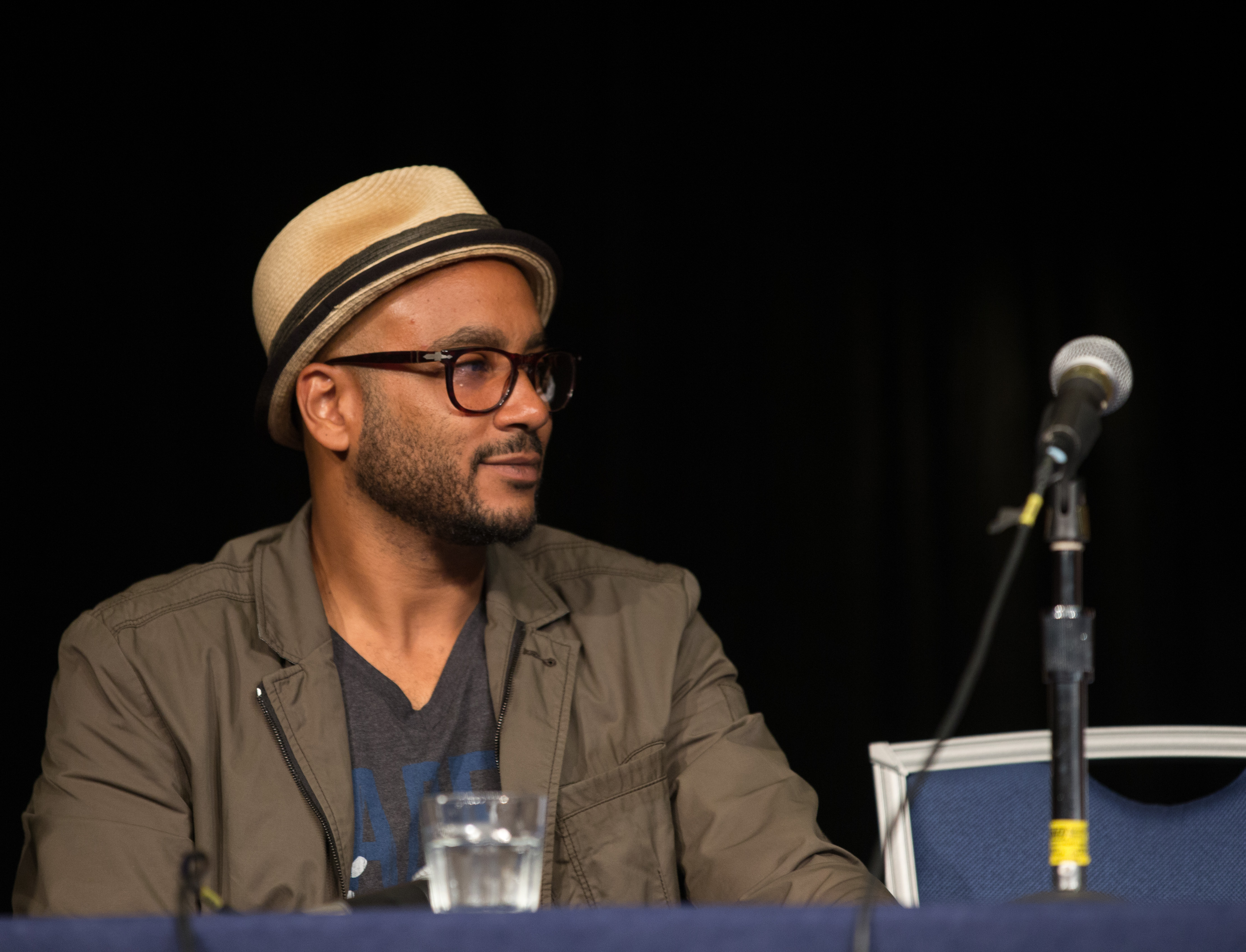
- Lofton as member of a panel at a Star Trek: Deep Space Nine convention in 2013
- Born: August 7, 1978 (age 48); Los Angeles, California, US
- Occupation: Actor
- Years active: 1986–present
- Known for: Jake Sisko (Star Trek: Deep Space Nine)
- Family: Kenny Lofton (cousin)

Cirroc Lofton (/səˈrɒk/, born August 7, 1978) is an American actor and podcaster who started his career at the age of nine with many minor roles. He got his start in the 1989 child education program Econ and Me, which teaches children economics. He is best known for playing Jake Sisko on the 1990s TV series Star Trek: Deep Space Nine.

== Personal life ==
According to Lofton, he is a distant relative, "perhaps a third cousin", of Major League Baseball center fielder Kenny Lofton.

== Career ==
Lofton's first major role on a TV series was also his longest role, playing Jake Sisko, the son of the lead character Benjamin Sisko, on the science fiction TV series Star Trek: Deep Space Nine from 1993 to 1999. In September 2003, he played Maynard, a preacher's son who went to Harvard, in the 7th Heaven episode "PK". He had a regular role as professional basketball player Curtis Thorpe on the Showtime drama series The Hoop Life, and a recurring role as law student Anthony Carter on the Showtime drama series Soul Food. Lofton portrayed Tommy Boyer in "Darkroom", a 2006 episode of the CBS television series CSI: Miami. In the fifth episode of Season 1 of Star Trek: Starfleet Academy, "Series Acclimation Mil", Lofton reprised his role as Jake Sisko as an adult after the events of the series.
