= The Hoop Life =

- Genre: Drama
- Created by: Sean Jablonski
- Starring: Rick Peters; Mykelti Williamson; Cirroc Lofton
- Composer: Bennie Wallace
- Country of origin: United States
- Original language: English
- No. of seasons: 1
- No. of episodes: 22

Production
- Executive producer: Joe Cacaci
- Running time: 60 minutes
- Production companies: Hardwood Productions; The Levinson-Fontana Company; Viacom Productions

Original release
- Network: Showtime
- Release: July 4, 1999 – March 19, 2000

The Hoop Life is an American drama television series depicting the lives of a team of basketball players in the fictional UBA (United Basketball Association) that aired on Showtime from July 4, 1999 until March 19, 2000. starring Rick Peters as Greg Marr, Mykelti Williamson as Marvin Buxton, and Cirroc Lofton as b-ball prodigy Curtis Thorpe.

== Cast ==
- Rick Peters as Greg Marr
- Mykelti Williamson as Marvin Buxton
- Cirroc Lofton as Curtis Thorpe

== Episodes ==
No.	Title	Directed by	Written by	Original release date
1	"The Hardwood"	Kevin Hooks	Sean Jablonski	July 4, 1999
2	"The Hardwood"	Kevin Hooks	Sean Jablonski	July 4, 1999
3	"It's All Greek to Me"	Unknown	Unknown	July 11, 1999
4	"Rookie"	Unknown	Unknown	July 18, 1999
5	"Of Human Bondage"	Unknown	Unknown	July 25, 1999
6	"The Doubleminded Man"	Unknown	Unknown	August 1, 1999
7	"Rook to Knight's Five"	Unknown	Unknown	August 8, 1999
8	"Acting on Impulse"	Unknown	Unknown	August 15, 1999
9	"Communication Breakdown"	Unknown	Unknown	August 22, 1999
10	"The Trade-Off"	Unknown	Unknown	August 29, 1999
11	"Young But Daily Growing"	Unknown	Unknown	October 10, 1999
12	"It's a Mad, Mad, Mad, Mad Locker Room"	Unknown	Unknown	October 17, 1999
13	"One Door Opens"	Unknown	Unknown	October 24, 1999
14	"A Knightmare"	Unknown	Unknown	December 5, 1999
15	"Road Trip"	Unknown	Unknown	December 12, 1999
16	"Skewed Confessions"	Unknown	Unknown	December 19, 1999
17	"End Game"	Unknown	Unknown	January 16, 2000
18	"Rock, Salt and Nails"	Unknown	Unknown	January 23, 2000
19	"A Little Yen"	Unknown	Unknown	January 30, 2000
20	"Back Stretch"	Unknown	Unknown	March 5, 2000
21	"The Talented Tenth"	Unknown	Unknown	March 12, 2000
22	"The Second Chance"	Unknown	Unknown	March 19, 2000
