= Jake Sisko =

Character on Star Trek: Deep Space Nine

- Star Trek character
- Jake Sisko from the season 7 episode Penumbra
- First appearance: "Emissary" (1993)
- Last appearance: "Series Acclimation Mil" (2026)
- Portrayed by: Cirroc Lofton; Tony Todd (middle-aged and elderly, "The Visitor"); Thomas Hobson (young, "Emissary")

In-universe information
- Species: Human
- Affiliation: United Federation of Planets
- Family: Joseph Sisko (grandfather); Sarah Sisko (grandmother); Judith Sisko (aunt); Benjamin Sisko (father); Jennifer Sisko (mother); Kasidy Yates (stepmother)
- Posting: Deep Space Nine Resident
- Position: Journalist (Seasons 4-7); Student (Seasons 1-3)

Jake Sisko is a fictional character in the Star Trek franchise. He appears in the television series Star Trek: Deep Space Nine (DS9) and is portrayed by actor Cirroc Lofton. He is the son of Deep Space Nine commanding officer Benjamin Sisko. The character also appears in various other Star Trek books, comics, and video games.

== Storyline ==
Jake Sisko first appeared in the Deep Space Nine series premiere. Jake is introduced as an adolescent, played by Cirroc Lofton (with Thomas Hobson portraying younger Jake in a flashback). Along with his father, Jake moves to the Deep Space Nine station three years after the death of his mother aboard USS Saratoga in the Battle of Wolf 359. In the season two episode "Shadowplay", Jake's age is stated as 15. This puts him at about 20 by the end of the series.

On the station, Jake becomes friends with a Ferengi named Nog, the son of Rom, despite the disapproval of both of their fathers. When Rom pulls Nog out of Keiko O'Brien's school, Jake secretly tutors him.

Jake aspires to be a writer, although he declined a scholarship to the Pennington School (New Zealand) in 2371. He briefly dated a Bajoran dabo girl named Mardah against his father's wishes, who embarrasses Jake by revealing his penchant for dom-jot hustling and poetry. In 2372, Jake wrote a draft of his first novel, Anslem, under the influence of Onaya, an alluring alien woman who feeds on creative neural energy by tactile absorption through the cranium ("The Muse").

As Jake became a young adult, he felt the need for independence and moved out of his father's quarters to become roommates with Nog, now a Starfleet Academy cadet on DS9 for field study. Jake's slovenliness and Nog's new-found neatness initially strain their friendship, until Benjamin Sisko, Nog's commander and Jake's father, orders them to settle their differences.

In an alternate timeline ("The Visitor"), Benjamin Sisko is thrust into an odd sub-space dimension after being struck by an errant energy bolt in the USS Defiant engine room. After the accident, Sisko is presumed dead, but he later appears to Jake several times throughout his life. After a short but successful career as a novelist (including the publication of Anslem), Jake spent the rest of his life trying to understand and reverse the accident. Jake learned that since his father and he were in close proximity when the accident occurred, a strange side effect has been causing Jake to act as a sort of anchor to his father in sub-space throughout the years, occasionally pulling Benjamin Sisko into the real world. Jake eventually determined that when he dies, the connection will be severed; if his father is in the real world at the time, he will be returned to the time of the accident, but if not, he will be lost forever in subspace. Jake therefore timed a lethal dose of medication for his father's next visit. After grieving his son, he returned to the past, dodges the energy bolt, and prevents this timeline from occurring (Jake as an older man is portrayed in this episode by Tony Todd).

Jake introduces his father to freighter captain Kasidy Yates, with whom Benjamin becomes romantically involved and marries in the final months of the Dominion War. During the Dominion occupation of Deep Space Nine, Jake remains there and serves as a reporter for the Federation News Service, though most of his work is suppressed by Weyoun and the Dominion authorities. Nevertheless, he is able to secretly send messages to his father through Morn.

Jake Sisko does not have a counterpart in the Mirror Universe. Mirror counterparts of Benjamin and Jennifer exist there, but they separate without having a child.

In the series finale, his father joins the Prophets, leaving Jake and Kasidy at DS9 for the final scene of the series. It is not clear if they remain there.

In Star Trek: Starfleet Academy, Series Acclimation Mil, or SAM, becomes obsessed with solving the mystery of Benjamin Sisko's disappearance over 800 years later due to her own work as an emissary. The Doctor reveals that he knew Jake as an adult, calling him a fantastic writer. SAM's friend Illa gives her Anslem, a book that Jake wrote but never published about his father. As SAM reads it, an adult Jake appears to her to talk about Benjamin. Afterwards, Illa reveals that Jake had asked her to keep the book safe and only share it with those who would understand how to use it. Illa is actually the latest host of the Dax symbiont who was friends with Benjamin and Jake.
