= Query letter =

Formal letter to propose writing ideas

A query letter, or query, is a formal letter sent by a writer to literary agents, magazine editors, and sometimes publishing houses or companies, to propose writing ideas.

Query letters are the standard format for unrepresented authors' submissions to potential agents; as such, querying is often a writer's first professional interaction with the publishing industry, with success furthering their steps on the traditional publishing path.

A standard requested format for a manuscript query letter to a literary agent could be approximately 200–400 words expressing the following information:

- The topic of the work
- A short description of the plot
- A short bio of the author
- The target audience

The literary agent would then decide whether to contact the author and request to see the manuscript, based on the contents of the query letter.

== See also ==
- Publishers Marketplace
