= Kirsten Beyer =

American science fiction writer

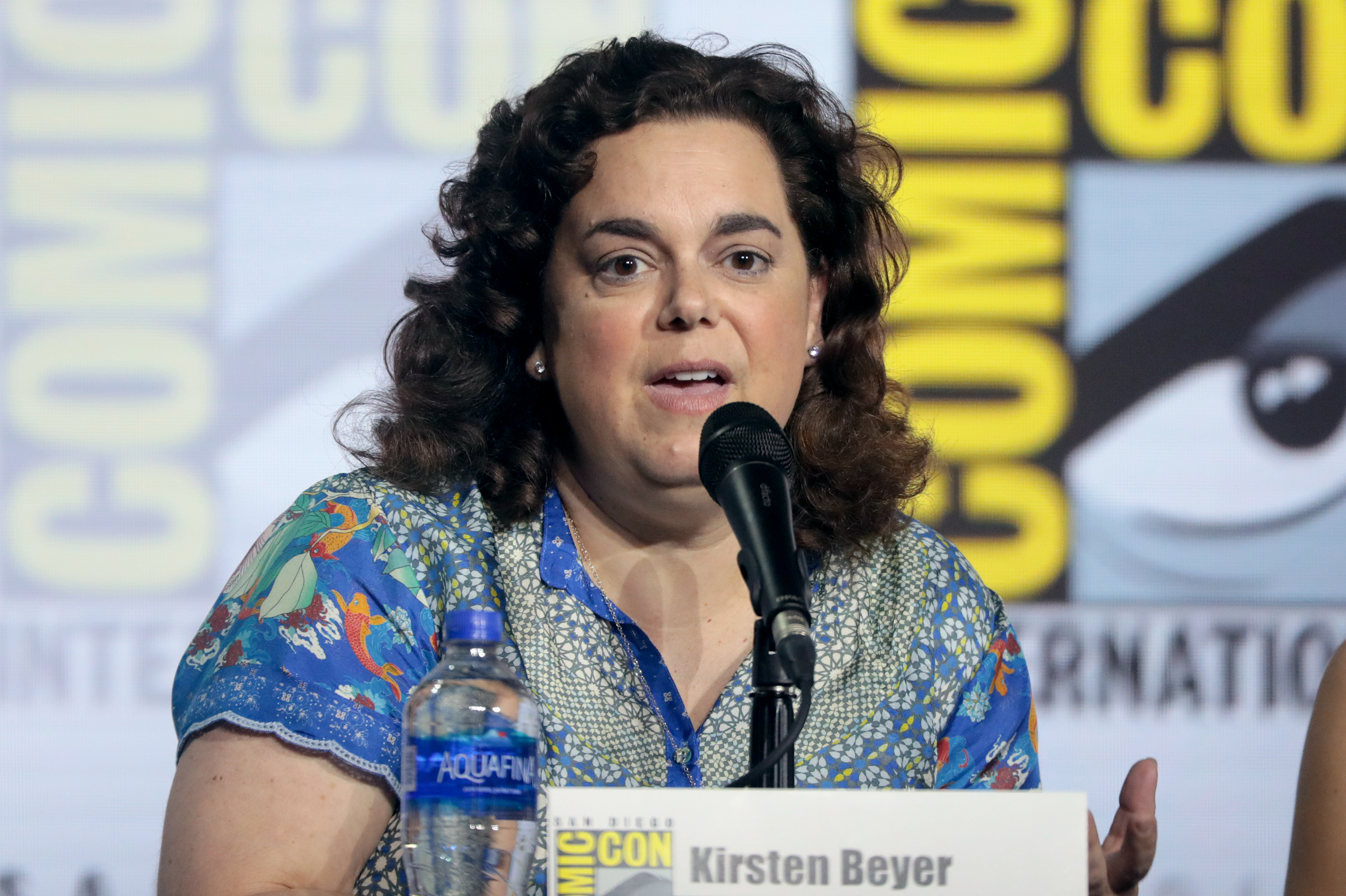
- Kirsten Beyer at the 2019 San Diego Comic Con
- Education: University of California, Los Angeles (MFA)
- Writing career
- Language: English
- Years active: 2005–present
- Genre: Science fiction

Kirsten Beyer is an American science fiction writer, known for her novels based on the Star Trek: Voyager television series. She was a staff writer for Star Trek: Discovery, and co-creator and executive producer of Star Trek: Picard.

She has also written for the Buffyverse.

== Career ==
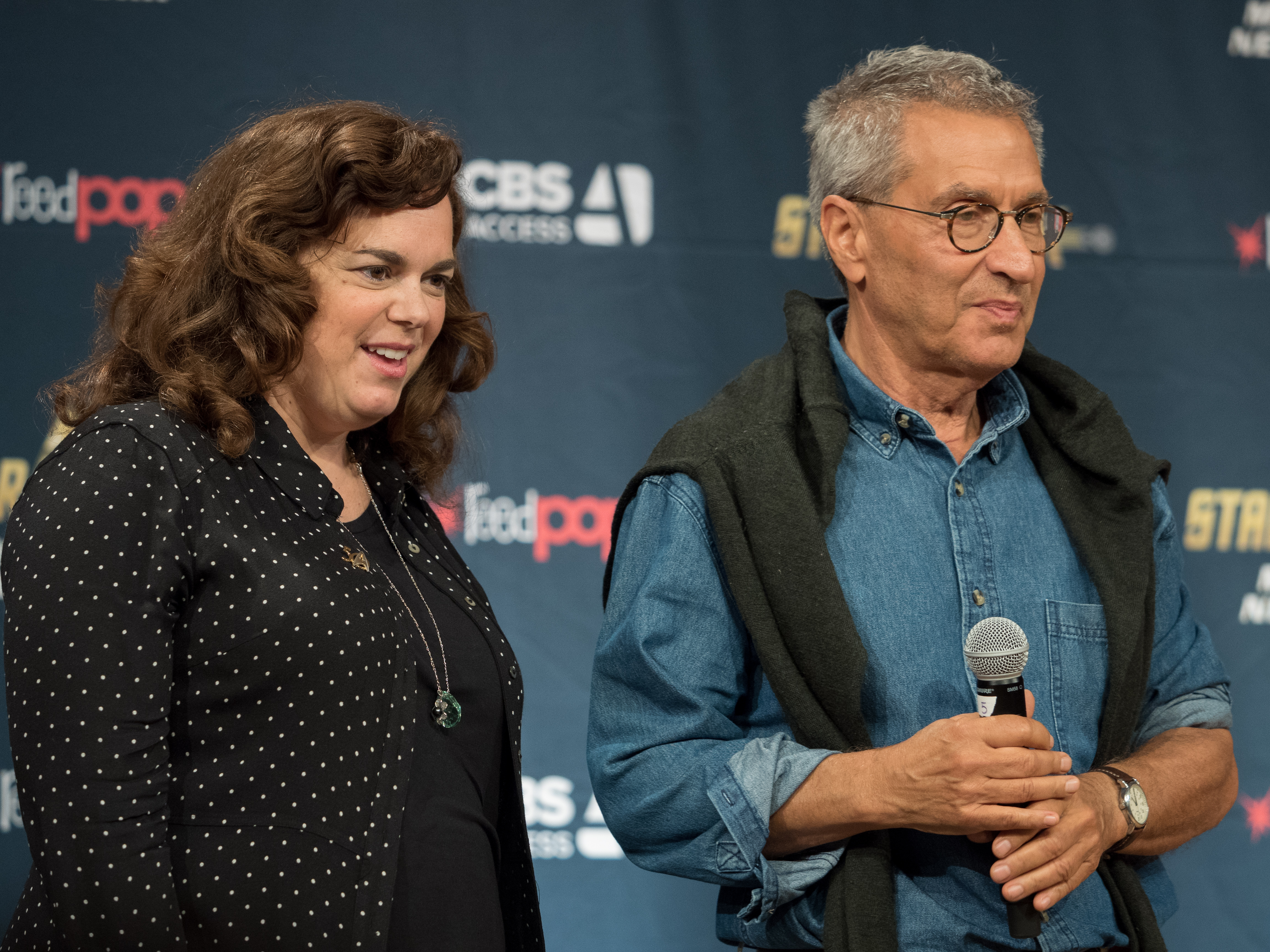
Beyer (left) and Nicholas Meyer (right) at Star Trek Mission New York (2016)

Little is known of Beyer's career prior to her involvement with the Star Trek franchise. She briefly worked as an actress and dancer for stage productions in the Los Angeles-area until the mid-1990s. After corresponding with Star Trek: Voyager executive producer Jeri Taylor and expressing an interest in writing for the series, Beyer was invited to pitch for the series. Beyer had previously submitted two spec scripts which were both rejected. She later pitched stories from Voyager's season five onward, but none were produced.

In 2004, Beyer was encouraged to send a query package to Pocket Books by her writing partner, Heather Jarman. Her query was accepted, and development of a new Voyager tie-in novel began. However, the editor leading the development moved on to other projects, and the novel under development was never realized. Beyer was later introduced to Marco Palmieri, editor of the Star Trek line at Pocket Books, by Jarman while both were attending the Shore Leave science fiction convention. Palmieri agreed to accept samples of her work, and invited Beyer to write for him a few days later.

Beyer's first novel with Palmieri was Fusion (2005), the second book in the Voyager: String Theory miniseries. A subplot involving the Vulcan character Tuvok was originally pitched as an episode of Voyager tentatively titled "Siren's Song". Another un-produced pitch was reworked as the short story "Isabo's Shirt", anthologized in Distant Shores (2005). Beyer became the lead writer of the Voyager novel series, replacing Christie Golden, with the release of Full Circle in March 2009. She has written eleven Voyager tie-in novels.

In May 2016, Beyer was hired as a staff writer for Star Trek: Discovery. She was recruited because of her familiarity with Star Trek canon, and her experience as a tie-in fiction writer. She has contributed to the Discovery and Star Trek: Picard comics line published by IDW. In 2020, Beyer read for the audiobook edition of To Lose the Earth.

== Bibliography ==
=== Star Trek: Voyager (2005–2020) ===
Star Trek: Voyager tie-in novels published by Simon & Schuster.

Title	Date	ISBN
Fusion (String Theory, Book 2)	October 25, 2005	1-4165-0955-0
Full Circle	March 31, 2009	978-1-4165-9496-3
Unworthy	September 29, 2009	978-1-4391-0398-2
Children of the Storm	May 31, 2011	978-1-4516-0718-5
The Eternal Tide	August 28, 2012	978-1-4516-6818-6
Protectors	January 28, 2014	978-1-4767-3854-3
Acts of Contrition	September 30, 2014	978-1-4767-6551-8
Atonement	August 25, 2015	978-1-4767-9081-7
A Pocket Full of Lies	January 26, 2016	978-1-4767-9084-8
Architects of Infinity	March 27, 2018	978-1-5011-3876-8
To Lose the Earth	October 13, 2020	978-1-5011-3883-6

=== Star Trek: Discovery (2017–2020) ===
Star Trek: Discovery tie-in comics published by IDW Publishing. Co-written by Mike Johnson. Beyer is credited as "Comic story writer" for most issues.

Issue	Issue date	Collection	Date	ISBN
The Light of Kahless, Issue 1	November 29, 2017	The Light of Kahless, Vol. 1	August 8, 2018	978-1-63140-989-9
The Light of Kahless, Issue 2	January 24, 2018	The Light of Kahless, Vol. 1	August 8, 2018	978-1-63140-989-9
The Light of Kahless, Issue 3	March 14, 2018	The Light of Kahless, Vol. 1	August 8, 2018	978-1-63140-989-9
The Light of Kahless, Issue 4	May 30, 2018	The Light of Kahless, Vol. 1	August 8, 2018	978-1-63140-989-9
Succession, Issue 1	April 18, 2018	Succession, Vol. 1	October 9, 2018	978-1-68405-360-5
Succession, Issue 2	May 23, 2018	Succession, Vol. 1	October 9, 2018	978-1-68405-360-5
Succession, Issue 3	June 27, 2018	Succession, Vol. 1	October 9, 2018	978-1-68405-360-5
Succession, Issue 4	August 1, 2018	Succession, Vol. 1	October 9, 2018	978-1-68405-360-5
Star Trek: Discovery Annual 2018	March 28, 2018	Succession, Vol. 1	October 9, 2018	978-1-68405-360-5
Aftermath, Issue 1	September 4, 2019	Aftermath, Vol. 1	Apr 14, 2020	978-1-68405-650-7
Aftermath, Issue 2	September 25, 2019	Aftermath, Vol. 1	Apr 14, 2020	978-1-68405-650-7
Aftermath, Issue 3	November 20, 2019	Aftermath, Vol. 1	Apr 14, 2020	978-1-68405-650-7
Captain Saru (special issue)	March 13, 2019	Aftermath, Vol. 1	Apr 14, 2020	978-1-68405-650-7

=== Star Trek: Picard (2019–2020) ===
Star Trek: Picard – Countdown comic miniseries is as a prequel to Star Trek: Picard. Artist is Angel Hernández.

Issue	Issue date	Collection	Date	ISBN
1	November 27, 2019	Countdown, Vol. 1	June 30, 2020	978-1-68405-694-1
2	December 18, 2019	Countdown, Vol. 1	June 30, 2020	978-1-68405-694-1
3	January 29, 2020	Countdown, Vol. 1	June 30, 2020	978-1-68405-694-1

=== Buffy the Vampire Slayer (2008) ===
Buffy the Vampire Slayer tie-in novels published by Simon & Schuster.

Title	Date	ISBN
One Thing or Your Mother	March 3, 2008	978-1-4169-3632-9
Buffy the Vampire Slayer 3 (omnibus)	November 16, 2010	978-1-4424-1211-8

=== Short fiction (2005–2009) ===
Beyer has contributed to the following short story collections:

Work	Collection	Editor	Date	ISBN
"Isabo's Shirt"	Distant Shores (Star Trek: Voyager)	Marco Palmieri	November 1, 2005	0-7434-9253-6
"Widow's Weeds"	Space Grunts (Full Throttle Space Tales, No. 3)	Dayton Ward	May 14, 2009	978-0-9818957-4-1

== Filmography ==
Year	Title	Role
2017–2024	Star Trek: Discovery	Consulting Producer / Co-Producer (33 episodes); Staff writer / Story editor (29 episodes); Episode: "Si Vis Pacem, Para Bellum" (written by); Episode: "Saints of Imperfection" (written by); Episode: "Unification III" (written by)
2019	Star Trek: Short Treks	Episode: "Children of Mars" (written by)
2020–2023	Star Trek: Picard	Co-creator / Executive producer (11 episodes); Episode: "Remembrance" (story by); Episode: "Stardust City Rag" (written by); Episode: "Mercy" (written by)
2022–present	Star Trek: Strange New Worlds	Co-executive producer (10 episodes); Episode: "Among the Lotus Eaters" (written by); Episode: "Wedding Bell Blues" (written by)
2026–present	Star Trek: Starfleet Academy	Co-executive producer Episode: "Series Acclimation Mil" (written by); Episode: "300th Night" (written by); Episode: "Rubincon" (written by)
