= Kids These Days (Star Trek: Starfleet Academy) =

- Star Trek: Starfleet Academy episode
- Episode no.: Season 1 Episode 1
- Directed by: Alex Kurtzman
- Written by: Gaia Volo
- Original release date: January 15, 2026
- Running time: 76 minutes

Guest appearances
- Tatiana Maslany as Anisha Mir; Paul Giamatti as Nus Braka; Rebecca Quin as Mackenzie Ya; Ken Barnett as Hayden Thriss; Michael Brown as Thelonious Dandrid; Nicole Dickinson as Astrid Atlee; Tricia Black as Rork; Avaah Blackwell as Haile; Joseph Chiu as Weldu; Raffa Virago as Pickford; Stephen Colbert as Digital Dean of Students

Episode chronology
← Previous —	Next → "Beta Test"
- Star Trek: Starfleet Academy season 1

"Kids These Days" is the series premiere of the American science fiction teen drama television series Star Trek: Starfleet Academy. The episode was written by series creator Gaia Volo, and directed by executive producer Alex Kurtzman. Part of Kurtzman's expanded Star Trek Universe, the series takes place in the 32nd century, the far-future time period that was introduced in Star Trek: Discovery and follows the first new class of Starfleet cadets in over a century as they come of age and train to be officers.

The episode was released on Paramount+ on January 15, 2026, alongside the following episode "Beta Test". In the episode, retired captain Nahla Ake is convinced to take on the role of Chancellor at the newly revived Starfleet Academy and comes face to face with Caleb Mir, a runaway and criminal whose mother she sentenced to prison fifteen years earlier. Reluctantly agreeing to join her, Caleb meets the other new cadets and inadvertently attracts the attention of the psychotic pirate Nus Braka.

It received positive reviews from critics, who praised the setting, fresh take on the modern Star Trek formula, and the performances of Hunter, Yashere, Picardo, Brooks, Giamatti, and Maslany.

== Plot ==
In 3180 on the Federation outpost Pikaru, ranking Starfleet officer Nahla Ake (Holly Hunter) holds a hearing for pirate Nus Braka, Anisha Mir, and her young son Caleb. In order to avoid starvation, Anisha had struck a deal with Braka to help him steal food rations from a Federation supply vessel, but became implicated as his accomplice when Braka murdered the pilot. Ake sentences Braka to a penal colony and Anisha to a rehabilitation camp, telling her that Caleb will be taken as a ward of the Federation. While attempting to comfort him, Caleb steals Ake's badge and escapes.

Fifteen years later, Admiral Charles Vance (Oded Fehr) visits Ake, who resigned from her post after disagreeing with the forced separation of Anisha and Caleb, and invites her to be the first Chancellor of the recommissioned Starfleet Academy. (Note: The official re-opening of the Academy is seen in the Star Trek: Discovery episode "Kobayashi Maru".) She initially refuses, but is convinced when Vance tells her that they have apprehended Caleb (Sandro Rosta), now a 21-year-old fugitive still searching for his mother. Ake asks Caleb to join Starfleet in exchange for avoiding prison and with the promise she will help him find Anisha, whom she reveals broke out of prison a year prior, and he reluctantly agrees despite his hatred for Ake and the Federation. She explains that the main Starfleet Academy campus is located in San Francisco, but also includes its own dedicated starship and mobile classroom, the USS Athena. Ake meets the Athena's bridge crew, led by the Jem'Hadar-Klingon Lura Thok (Gina Yashere), while Caleb meets some of his classmates: pacifistic Klingon Jay-Den Kraag (Karim Diané); SAM (Kerrice Brooks), a Kasqian and the academy's first photonic student; Genesis Lythe (Bella Shepard), the Dar-Sha daughter of an admiral; and Darem Reymi (George Hawkins), a cocky Khionian jock with whom he instantly clashes. The Doctor (Robert Picardo) completes the medical appraisals of each student, and begrudgingly acts as a mentor alongside the no-nonsense cadet-master Thok.

As the Athena begins the journey to Earth, Caleb uses an old subspace frequency of his mother's to try and send her a message but receives no reply. The ship is then ambushed by Braka and his crew, who use programmable matter to disable its systems, and Braka reveals to Ake that he used Caleb's transmission to find them. He demands that Ake surrender the Athena’s warp core or risk the whole ship and its crew being destroyed. With the support of SAM, Jay-Den performs emergency surgery on Thok, who was injured in the initial attack, while Genesis opens the airlock to enable Darem, who can briefly survive the harsh conditions of space due to his Khionian physiology, to scan the programmable matter and transmit the frequency to Caleb. Braka taunts Caleb by telling him that he helped break Anisha out of prison and the two fight before Braka flees in an escape pod as Caleb successfully deactivates the programmable matter and saves the ship.

Arriving at the Starfleet Academy campus in San Francisco, Ake tells Caleb that, despite putting everyone in danger, she can convince her superiors to allow him to remain with Starfleet if that's what he wants. Caleb agrees to stay, and the two have a heart-to-heart where she reveals that her own son was killed during The Burn. (Note: A catastrophic cosmic event originally depicted during Star Trek: Discovery causing the destruction of every active warp core and resulting in the near-collapse of the United Federation of Planets.)

== Production ==
=== Writing ===
The episode was written by series creator and executive producer Gaia Violo, marking her first writing credit on the show.

=== Filming ===
Filming for the episode began on August 26, 2024, the first day of production on the series as a whole. It was directed by executive producer Alex Kurtzman. The set used as the main atrium of the USS Athena was reported to be the largest set ever built for a Star Trek series, and covered the entirety of Pinewood Toronto Studios 45,900 square foot soundstage.

Sandro Rosta, who portrayed Caleb and was hired for the show straight out of drama school, had never done stunt work before, and credited the show's stunt team with helping him through his two major fight scenes in the episode. He stated, "they knew that I was game. So they let me do as much of it as possible, even the slamming against the walls and stuff". Rosta also praised Paul Giamatti willingness to make space for him despite the great difference in their experience levels as actors during their fight scene together near the end of the episode, explaining that, "that part of the scene where he smashes my head on the console, that came from a suggestion that I that I had in the moment. I was like, ‘Man, if I bust your head on it and you bust my head on it, I think that’d be kind of cool.’ And Paul was like, ‘We’re doing that. We’re freaking doing that!’ — and we did it. And that just shows how much he's willing to give space to me, a younger and less experienced actor, to have a moment of expression."

=== Music ===
The episode features a cover of the 1967 Scott McKenzie song "San Francisco (Be Sure to Wear Flowers in Your Hair)" by Rufus Wainwright, which plays over the scenes of the USS Athena approaching Starfleet Academy in San Francisco for the first time. It was recorded specifically for the show by Wainwright, a choir, and an orchestra conducted by Jeff Russo. A second version of the song was also recorded featuring reduced instrumentation. Both are featured on the season's official soundtrack.

== Release ==
"Kids These Days" was released on January 15, 2026, on Paramount+ alongside "Beta Test", the show's second episode.

== Reception ==
In a positive review, Scott Collura of IGN wrote, "while the pilot episode falls into a bit of the shock-and-awe trap that modern Star Trek sometimes does, it soon settles into a fun and exciting story that establishes the endearing young cast and direction of the new show". He praised the new cast of cadets, expressing that, "there’s a moment early in the episode, when this group all run into each other in a corridor, that made me start to fall for the lot of them", the return of Robert Picardo, and the "hilarious" performance of Gina Yashere, but was more mixed on Holly Hunter's performance as Nahla, stating that "some of her line readings are a bit rough", and felt that, while Paul Giamatti's Nus Braka was a "funny and disruptive presence", he could "see too much of Nus becoming a bad thing".

As part of their "Stream It or Skip It" series, Joel Keller of Decider, declared that viewers should watch Starfleet Academy writing that the show is "a perfectly entertaining entry in the now-60-year-old Trek franchise, punctuated by fun performances by Hunter and Giamatti. We just worry that the more generic-feeling Academy portion of the series will overwhelm the usually-reliable starship adventures." He highlighted the confrontation between Nahla and Nus as "a joy to watch".

Writing for Reactor, Keith DeCandido praised the setting, describing it as a "masterstroke" to have the show take place in the 32nd century, and lauded the performance of Hunter as Nahla Ake writing that, "Hunter inhabits the character magnificently", and praising her differences from previous Star Trek captains, and Hunter's ability to portray the character in a similar manner to Pelia, the franchise's only other Lanthanite played by Carol Kane in Star Trek: Strange New Worlds, while still ensure she is "very much her own person" and pulling back on the more eccentric elements of Kane's portrayal. He also praised Paul Giamatti, Tatiana Maslany, and Robert Picardo's return as The Doctor, noting that the character is "as ever, a total delight" and called Picardo a "treasure". While feeling the Athena's bridge crew as a whole were "a bit hit-and-miss", DeCandido lauded Gina Yashere's performance as Lura, calling her "magnificent" and writing that, "Yashere plays the role with gusto, modulating hilariously from deferential when dealing with Ake and the other adults to drill-sergeant bluster when interacting with the cadets". Similarly, he felt the new cadets were also a "mixed bag", but called SAM his favorite, stating, "Kerrice Brooks plays her as delightfully nerdy, and I just want to hug her". He was critical of the character of Caleb, feeling that his technological skills were too unbelievable, and that he was "sick to death of him before the opening credits even rolled".
