= Vitus Reflux =

- Star Trek: Starfleet Academy episode
- Episode no.: Season 1 Episode 3
- Directed by: Doug Aarniokoski
- Written by: Kiley Rossetter; Alex Taub
- Cinematography by: Philip Lanyon
- Editing by: Jon Dudkowski
- Original release date: January 22, 2026
- Running time: 63 minutes

Guest appearances
- Raoul Bhaneja as Commander Kelrec; Romeo Carere as Ocam Sadal; Alexander Eling as B'avi; Dale Whibley as Kyle Jokovic; Cecilia Lee as Dzolo; Scott Gemmel as Posse member; Mia Yaguchi-Chow as Posse member; Ritchie Lawrence as Posse member; Lily Du as Vitus Reflux; Kostyn Mitruk as "Mugato"; Chris Hong as Holo-guard; John Fray as Botany instructor; Brian David Gilbert as DoT; Rekha Shankar as DoT; Jeremy Culhane as DoT

Episode chronology
← Previous "Beta Test"	Next → "Vox in Excelso"
- Star Trek: Starfleet Academy season 1

"Vitus Reflux" is the third episode of the first season of the American science fiction teen drama television series Star Trek: Starfleet Academy. The episode was written by Kiley Rossetter and Alex Taub, and directed by Doug Aarniokoski. Part of Alex Kurtzman's expanded Star Trek Universe, the series takes place in the 32nd century, the far-future time period that was introduced in Star Trek: Discovery and follows the first new class of Starfleet cadets in over a century as they come of age and train to be officers.

The episode was released on Paramount+ on January 22, 2026. In the episode, the cadets from Starfleet Academy compete in a battle of escalating pranks with the cadets at the rival War College, culminating in an after-curfew match of Calica which causes tensions to rise between Darem and Genesis. It received mixed reviews from critics, who praised the performances by Hawkins and Shepard, and the fresh take on the familiar school vs school trope, but felt the plot was unnecessarily convoluted and overly cheesy and were polarised on the new secondary characters.

== Plot ==
Darem Reymi (George Hawkins) sends a message to his parents, explaining how he has settled into life at Starfleet Academy and consistently strives for greatness, only to find that Genesis Lythe (Bella Shepard) is equally driven, wanting to prove her worth and step out of the shadow of her father. In the gym, Lura Thok (Gina Yashere) pushes the academy cadets to their limits, while the school rivalry between them and the War College begins to escalate when they begin provoking Caleb (Sandro Rosta), and pulling a prank where the cadets are transported to various locations while changing in the locker room. Thok takes her concerns to Nahla Ake (Holly Hunter), who refuses to intervene, but does introduce the cadets to the Vitus reflux, a rare empathy fungus that is sensitive to emotions.

The cadets try out to join the academy's elite Calica (Note: A team sport comparable to laser tag designed to help prepare the cadets for real-world combat.) team, coached by Thok and Jett Reno (Tig Notaro). Darem and Genesis compete to become team captain, with Darem using her insecurities about her father to distract her and win the role. Caleb questions Tarima (Zoë Steiner) about why she joined the War College over the academy, believing she did it to avoid him, though she rebukes him and explains that she needs the discipline the college will instil in her. The pranks continue, and Ake accuses War College Chancellor Kelrec of helping his cadets, which he denies. Starfleet Academy challenge the War College to a secret late-night Calica match to settle the score. Darem's aggressive strategy backfires and Genesis takes over as captain, implementing a strategy using SAM's (Kerrice Brooks) abilities to obscure their opponent's view. Thok and Reno break up the match and send the cadets to Ake, who chastises them for not heeding her advice around patience and empathy, assigning them forced labor as a punishment.

After seeing that Darem's parents have not responded to any of his messages since he arrived at the academy, Reno confides in Darem about her relationship with Lura, explaining that she left her post on the USS Discovery to be with her and encourages him to rethink about how he has treated Genesis. (Note: Reno was last seen serving on the USS Discovery in 3191 in the Star Trek: Discovery finale "Life, Itself".) Darem then reconciles with Genesis, revealing his own fractured relationship with his family. Genesis realizes that Ake has been dropping hints of how to win the prank war, and comes up with a plan to infiltrate the War College and sabotage them. Tarima catches Caleb during this and admits that she has feelings for him, but sounds the alarm anyway. Vitus reflux begins growing out of control in the college dorms, and Kelrec ultimately admits defeat to Ake, who later explains to Caleb that a core tenet of Starfleet is in working out ways to disarm opponents without resorting to full-on conflict. Darem happily concedes the captaincy of the Calica team to Genesis, understanding that she is more ready to lead than he is, and sends another message to his parents, telling them he plans to allow himself to lead and be led with empathy.

== Production ==
The episode concludes with a tribute to late costume designer Carla Mingiardi, who died in September 2024, ahead of the credits. Mingiardi worked on Star Trek: Discovery and Star Trek: Short Treks.

=== Writing ===
The episode was written by Kiley Rossetter and Alex Taub, marking the first writing credit on the show for both.

George Hawkins, who portrays Darem, stated that the initial audition script he received for Starfleet Academy featured an adapted version of this episode, reframed as a "human version of the story" in order to hide that it was a Star Trek project. Of Darem, whose strained relationship with his parents is explored in "Vitus Reflux", he expressed that "he comes from a background of extremely high expectations. There's a 'standard of excellence' he's been raised to uphold. He's Khionian, from a very specific family on Khionia, and there's a promise he's carrying for his people. If he's going to come to Starfleet Academy, he has to be exceptional. It has to be worth it. That pressure isn't just personal ambition, it's generational. It's his family, and in a wider sense, his entire culture. He sees the other cadets as something to push past in order to prove himself. The pressure I was putting on myself to land the role and the pressure Darem lives with really collided, and I think that came through in the tape".

Discussing the official confirmation of the relationship between Jett Reno and Lura Thok, which had been previously revealed during a cast interview with TV Insider prior to the debut of the series, Tig Notaro, who portrays Reno, explained that she found it "interesting" to incorporate romance into the series due to her character being single throughout her tenure on Star Trek: Discovery, but admitted that she was surprised by the pairing at first stating, "I didn't think our dynamic made sense at first because I thought I would be the more dominant personality in a relationship". Notaro advised that she was convinced that the couple worked well together when she watched the show with her real wife, who reacted positively, joking that "to make a relationship work, one person needs to be a little scared of the other one". Gina Yashere, who plays Lura, noted that she was already a fan of Notaro's before they started working together, explaining that "when they told me that Tig was going to be in the show and we were going to be in a relationship, I was like, 'My God, this is going to be fun and hilarious'. I get to play opposite one of my favorite comics, and we get to act together. It was like, this is brilliant. I had no idea what it was going to be. And I knew it was going to be weird for her having to be in a relationship with a scaly blue thing." Both actresses felt the relationship was "very serious" and that they portrayed this throughout the season through "little moments", with Notaro feeling that "we see a softness to Lura when she looks at Jett". Of the relationship, series producer Alex Kurtzman stated, "they're very different. Their energies could not be more different", but that he loved that "two of the funniest people in the world" were together in the show. He advised that Notaro was the first person cast for the show and that, once Yashere was cast and the idea was proposed for the characters to be in a relationship, he felt "oh my God, we could just write these scenes forever. They're so fantastic to watch". Showrunner Noga Landau discussed how Reno had revealed that she was a widow in Discovery, and that a character who was "in mourning but unattached" would be drawn to a comedic person like Lura and that it "seemed organic that they would fall in love".

== Release ==
"Vitus Reflux" was released on January 22, 2026, on Paramount+.

== Reception ==
The episode received generally positive reviews from critics. Writing for IGN, Scott Collura wrote, "Starfleet Academy's third episode is a bit hit or miss, taking a fairly simple story and perhaps making it overly complicated. The gags don't always work in this battle of the classes tale, but even so, the addition of even more supporting and potentially recurring characters does a lot to build out the world around our core cadets. As for that main group, this week it's George Hawkins' Darem and Bella Shepard's Genesis who get to shine, with Darem in particular coming around to a very nice – and classic Star Trek – moment by episode's end". Richard Edwards of Space praised the relatability of the plot, but joked that "Vitus Reflux could suddenly disappear from Paramount+ and have little bearing on the future of the show and its characters", noting that despite the low stakes, the episode was "actually kind of fun", and that this was a sign "that this show might be starting to carve out its own unique sector within the Star Trek universe." Ashley Thomas from Fangirlish enjoyed the comedic elements of the episode and felt the final prank using the Vitus reflex was "very satisfying in its payoff". She praised Darem's character development, particularly highlighting the scene between him and Reno, and the episode's overall message about practising patience and empathy. She wrote, "“Vitus Reflux” is a great episode that gives us more of what we would expect from a young adult-focused series, and yet there's something in it that is still distinctly Star Trek. There are the hijinks you'd expect from a CW show with a splash of romance between Caleb and Tarima, but also has some heart and soul."

Steven Thrash of Red Shirts Always Die gave the episode a 3.5 rating out of 5, and compared the Vitus reflux to Audrey II from Little Shop of Horrors and praised its "hilarious and integral" role in the plot, but felt the story overall "isn't quite as engaging" as the previous episodes due to the lack of references to the previously established plot threads such as Caleb's search for his mother or the villain Nus Braka. He praised the performances of Hawkins and Shepard as Darem and Genesis, writing that their "acting approaches were wonderful, providing authentic feelings for their respective characters to exude realistically, which will help these characters resonate strongly with fans", and also highlighted Kerrice Brooks as SAM, Karim Diane as Jay-Den, and Yashere as Lura who "shined" despite their limited screen time in the episode. He also enjoyed Holly Hunter's "over-the-top" approach to Nahla's response to the prank war, and noted that Cecilia Lee, who played War College cadet Dzolo was a "pleasant surprise" because she "commanded the screen virtually every time" she appeared. He also praised the episodes cinematography, visual effects, and the horror-inspired elements. Daniel Bibby of Winter Is Coming felt the episode was a "jarring change of pace" from the previous two episodes of the season, but felt that Calica was "a relatively cinematic sport that's sort of fun to watch", and questioned the narrative need to invent an entire new sport rather than calling back to previous Star Trek series and utilising something that had already been depicted in other episodes of the franchise.

In a more mixed review, Lacy Baugher of Den of Geek also referenced the episode's "youthful vibe", but criticised the supporting characters from the War College, referring to them as "interchangeable jerks, smug in the way that is both vaguely unlikable and kind of dull", and stated that while she felt the plot was "fairly predictable", it made sense for the characters. She praised Hawkins' performance as Darem and the character's growth throughout the episode, calling his apology to Genesis "surprisingly genuine" and enjoyed some of the "interesting smaller moments throughout the episode", such as the revelation of Reno and Lura's relationship, Caleb's dynamic with Tarima, and Darem's characterization as someone desperate for his parents' approval. She concluded that "though the hour's larger arc is fairly ridiculous, it's nice to see Starfleet Academy's core group get the chance to bond as an ensemble in ways that go beyond their various connections to and relationships with Caleb. And that's a promising enough development to overlook some of the… let's just say stupidly youthful antics we have to sit through to get there". Ian Cullen of SciFi Pulse gave the episode a 7.1 rating, praising the performances, score, and stunts, but felt the plot leant too heavily into "cheesy territory" and criticised the role of Nahla Ake.
