= Nahla Ake =

Star Trek alien character

- Star Trek character
- Nahla Ake, portrayed by Holly Hunter
- First appearance: "Kids These Days" (2026) (Starfleet Academy)
- Created by: Alex Kurtzman; Noga Landau
- Portrayed by: Holly Hunter

In-universe information
- Species: Half human and half Lanthanite
- Occupation: Chancellor of Starfleet Academy; Captain of the USS Athena
- Family: Unnamed son
- Affiliation: United Federation of Planets, Starfleet, USS Athena, Starfleet Academy

Nahla Ake is a fictional character in the Star Trek franchise, portrayed by American actress Holly Hunter. First appearing in "Kids These Days", the pilot episode of Star Trek: Starfleet Academy, Nahla is introduced as a former Starfleet captain who resigned from the United Federation of Planets after following the law over her own conscience and ruling to separate a mother from her young son. Fifteen years later, she is recruited to become Chancellor of the newly-recommissioned Starfleet Academy. She is a Lanthanite/Human hybrid, and the first Lanthanite main character in a Star Trek series.

The character has been well-received by critics, who praised her unique personality and physicality which contrasts with that of previous Star Trek captains, as well as Hunter's performance.

== Fictional character biography ==
=== Season 1 ===
In 3180 on the Federation outpost Pikaru, Ake is the commanding officer and holds a hearing for pirate Nus Braka, Anisha Mir, and her young son Caleb. In order to avoid starvation, Anisha reveals that she struck a deal with Braka to help him steal food rations from a Federation supply vessel, but became implicated as his accomplice when he murdered the pilot. Ake sentences Braka to a penal colony and Anisha to a rehabilitation camp, telling her that Caleb will be taken as a ward of the Federation. While attempting to comfort him, Caleb steals Ake's badge and escapes. Fifteen years later, Admiral Charles Vance visits Ake, who is now living on Bajor teaching children after she resigned from her post following the trial. Vance tells her he is recomissioning Starfleet Academy and offers here the role of Chancellor, which she initially refuses until he reveals that Caleb has been apprehended by the Torothans. Ake asks Caleb to join Starfleet in exchange for avoiding prison and with the promise she will help him find Anisha, whom she reveals broke out of prison a year prior, and he reluctantly agrees despite his hatred for both Ake and the Federation. Assuming her role as Chancellor, Ake also becomes captain of the Academy's starship and mobile classroom, the USS Athena. The ship is attacked by Braka, who was inadvertently drawn to it by Caleb, but Ake is able to stall and deceive him long enough for Caleb and some of the other cadets to save the day. Arriving at the Starfleet Academy campus in San Francisco, Ake tells Caleb that, despite putting everyone in danger, she can convince her superiors to allow him to remain with Starfleet if that's what he wants. Caleb agrees to stay, and the two have a heart-to-heart where she reveals that her own son was killed during The Burn, a catastrophic cosmic event that brought the Federation to near-collapse. Ake soon settles into her role as Chancellor, providing guidance and discipline to the cadets, while establishing a rivalry with Commander Kelrec, the Chancellor of the military-focused War College. Their relationship culminates in Kelrec revealing that he has been harbouring resentment towards Ake for abandoning Starfleet fifteen years prior, though the two ultimately reconcile and agree to try and work together moving forward.

Ake and Kelrec later send their cadets on a training mission to restore power to the derelict USS Miyazaki, but it goes awry when the ship is attacked by the furies, a cannibalistic group of hybrid scavengers, who take the cadets hostage. Vance suggests that Ake contact Braka, who had successfully driven the furies away from his own operations previously, and Ake reluctantly agrees. When he arrives, Braka taunts Ake about the death of her son, stating that he an SOS from his ship before it was destroyed but that she chose to remain with her crew to ensure their survival. He tells her that her guilt over this decision has influenced her role as a teacher, and mocks that, as a half-Lanthanite, she is forced to live a near-eternal life in isolation. Ake remains silent, and Braka eventually talks for long enough to inadvertently reveal his own weaknesses, which she uses to force him to help her rescue the cadets. Though she and her crew are able to rescue most of the cadets, Braka double-crosses her and is able to ransack a Starfleet space station full of experimental weapons, and Ake is left reeling.

== Development ==
=== Casting ===
Ake is portrayed by American actress Holly Hunter. Her casting in the show's lead role was officially announced on May 21, 2024, revealing that she would "serve as the captain and chancellor of the Academy, presiding over both the faculty and a new class of Starfleet cadets as they learn to navigate the galaxy in the 32nd century". In the announcement, showrunners Noga Landau and Alex Kurtzman stated, "it feels like we’ve spent our entire lives watching Holly Hunter be a stone-cold genius. To have her extraordinary authenticity, fearlessness, sense of humor, and across the board brilliance leading the charge on ‘Starfleet Academy’ is a gift to all of us, and to the enduring legacy of Star Trek." Kurtzman later stated in an interview that the character of Nahla Ake was originally written with Hunter in mind, but that the team did not expect her to be interested and that they were shocked and delighted when she "signed on right away" after receiving the first scripts. The character's name was revealed on July 28, 2025 alongside the roles of the rest of the main cast during the Star Trek universe panel at San Diego Comic-Con.

Discussing her casting, Hunter stated that she approached Landau and Kurtzman after being offered the role with thoughts about how the character should behave, explaining that "I had ideas about Nahla being more of a fluid creature. Somebody who was like liquid, like water," and adding that she wanted her movements to be "feline" and "tactile". Hunter expressed that, while she did some research into the franchise, she was more interested in creating a new and unique character and was not overly concerned about fitting into the mould of previous Star Trek captains noting, "in a way, that’s just not my business." Kurtzman echoed this when explaining the decision to approach Hunter advising that, "when we were looking to cast Nahla, we knew that we needed an actor who could be different than every other captain yet maintain the authority of what a captain requires. We also knew we wanted her to be quirky because she’s over 420 years old and sort of come to the point in her long, long life where she decides that she no longer wants to wear shoes around the starship." Hunter later spoke about how she tended to avoid projects that push certain messages, but that she was drawn to Starfleet Academy ethos of imparting empathy.

=== Characterization ===
Kurtzman noted that the character contains multitudes, and that casting Hunter allowed them to "take extraordinary risks that you might not be able to take with an actor who couldn’t pull that off". He explained, "the character is over 415 years old, so she’s lived an enormous amount of life. That affords her a unique perspective on everything. And because she was a mother and she lost a child, it gives her a unique perspective on what it means to raise the kids of Starfleet Academy, which also qualifies her to be a great chancellor. So, she’s a captain who is happy to walk around the bridge without shoes on, but the minute the chips are down, and something really goes wrong, she takes that chair with real authority". He felt that one of the character's main strengths was her quirky irreverence and genuine emotion, expressing that Ake "represents the things that were always my favorite things about the best teachers I had, which were that they were quirky and they thought differently".

Ake is a half human and half Lanthanite, a long-lived species originally introduced in the second season of Star Trek: Strange New Worlds. The only other Lanthanite in the franchise is Pelia, who is portrayed by Carol Kane and, while it was initially speculated that Pelia could be Ake's mother, Ake later reveals that her father is responsible for her Lanthanite heritage. Reviewers noted that the decision for Ake to be part Lanthanite was likely made so that the character could have lived hundreds of years by the start of the show, and would be able to remember the original Federation and Starfleet prior to The Burn, offering her a unique perspective as one of the only living characters to have attended the original Starfleet Academy. Hunter felt it was important to exhibit Ake's age through the way she interacts with the world, particularly through her physicality, explaining that "how could that manifest in a different way that would not just be flouting protocol because oh, I’m a rebel? It’s not as simple as that. It’s more selfish. It’s more interior, but the interior has been made totally not precious. It’s just part of her now. The barefoot thing was something that Alex had put in the script that I just loved, and it kind of snowballed from there. When I got on set, I saw how adventurous the furniture could be for me." The characters name translates to ‘water in the desert’ which helped to influence Hunter's performance, comparing Nahla's physicality to that of a liquid and explaining "wherever I am, whatever environment that I’m in, I’m going to explore it with my body".

Daniel Bibby of Winter Is Coming felt that aspects of Ake's physicality were "performative", writing of her demeanour in the sixth episode "Come, Let's Away", "When things get serious in Episode 6, Captain Ake sits bolt upright, far more like a traditional Starfleet captain. Without even saying a word, this communicates to her crew and the cadets that something is seriously wrong. Think of it as a physical embodiment of a Red Alert. When she's sprawled out in the seat, everything's fine. When she's not, it's time to lock in. It's far less distracting than a blaring siren and flashing lights."

== Reception ==
The character, and Hunter's portrayal, has received generally positive reviews from critics. Lacy Braugher of Den of Geek wrote that, "Hunter is great, deftly holding a multitude of tensions simultaneously within her performance. Effortlessly shifting between gravitas, an almost painful sincerity, and a certain kind of playful oddness, she serves multiple roles within the world of Starfleet Academy, much like the ship she captains", and declared Nahla "one of the most intriguing new characters that Star Trek has introduced in quite some time". Graeme Virtue of The Guardian also praised how the character differed from previous captains writing, "Hunter’s free-spirited Ake is unlike any other Trek captain. She casually goes barefoot, favours old-school Two Ronnies specs, and has a habit of folding her legs up into the captain’s chair in a way that feels genuinely transgressive." Angie Han of The Hollywood Reporter wrote, "Hunter is a total delight as the half-Lanthanite Nahla, whose tiny stature, playful humor and disregard for propriety (this is a woman who keeps inventing new ways to slouch into chairs) belie her quiet strength as a Starfleet officer." Ben Travers of IndieWire called Hunter's performance "a floodlight of personality".

== See also ==
- List of barefooters
