= George Hawkins (actor) =

British actor

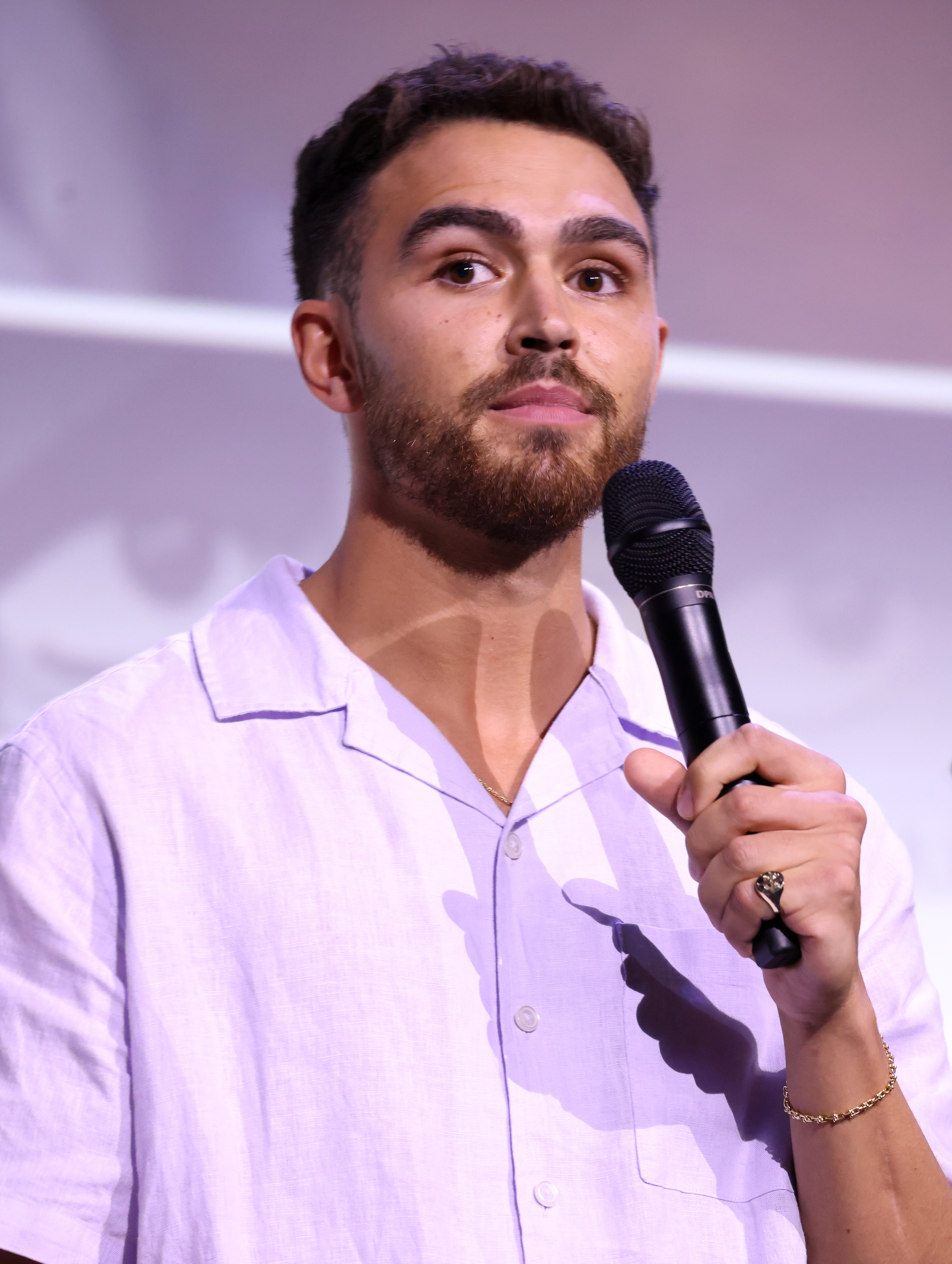
George Hawkins (2025)

George Hawkins is a British actor most known for his role as Darem Reymi in the Star Trek series Starfleet Academy.

== Life and career ==
George Hawkins, whose family has Italian, New Zealand and English roots, completed his acting training at the Mountview Academy of Theatre Arts in London in 2023. He had already made an appearance in Boiling Point as Sean in 2021. After completing his training, he began to establish himself through roles in the British teen series Tell Me Everything (as Dylan) and the London crime drama Gassed Up (as Adam).

The next step was his casting as Darem Reymi in Star Trek: Starfleet Academy (from 2026). In the series, Hawkins plays the first Khionian in the Star Trek universe. Hawkins had previously become familiar with the franchise through the 2009 feature film; to prepare for his role, he specifically immersed himself in series such as Enterprise, Discovery, Strange New Worlds and Lower Decks. His close collaboration with co-star Karim Diané shapes many of his scenes in the series. During the filming of Starfleet Academy, he lived and worked in Toronto.

In January 2026, Hawkins appeared together with Holly Hunter and other cast members of Star Trek: Starfleet Academy on NBC's Kelly Clarkson Show to promote the series.

== Filmography ==
- 2021: Boiling Point
- 2023: Gassed Up
- 2024: Tell Me Everything (TV series, 6 episodes)
- from 2026: Star Trek: Starfleet Academy (TV series)
