= Celebration of Cinema and Television =

Awards ceremony by Critics Choice Association

Celebration of Cinema and television
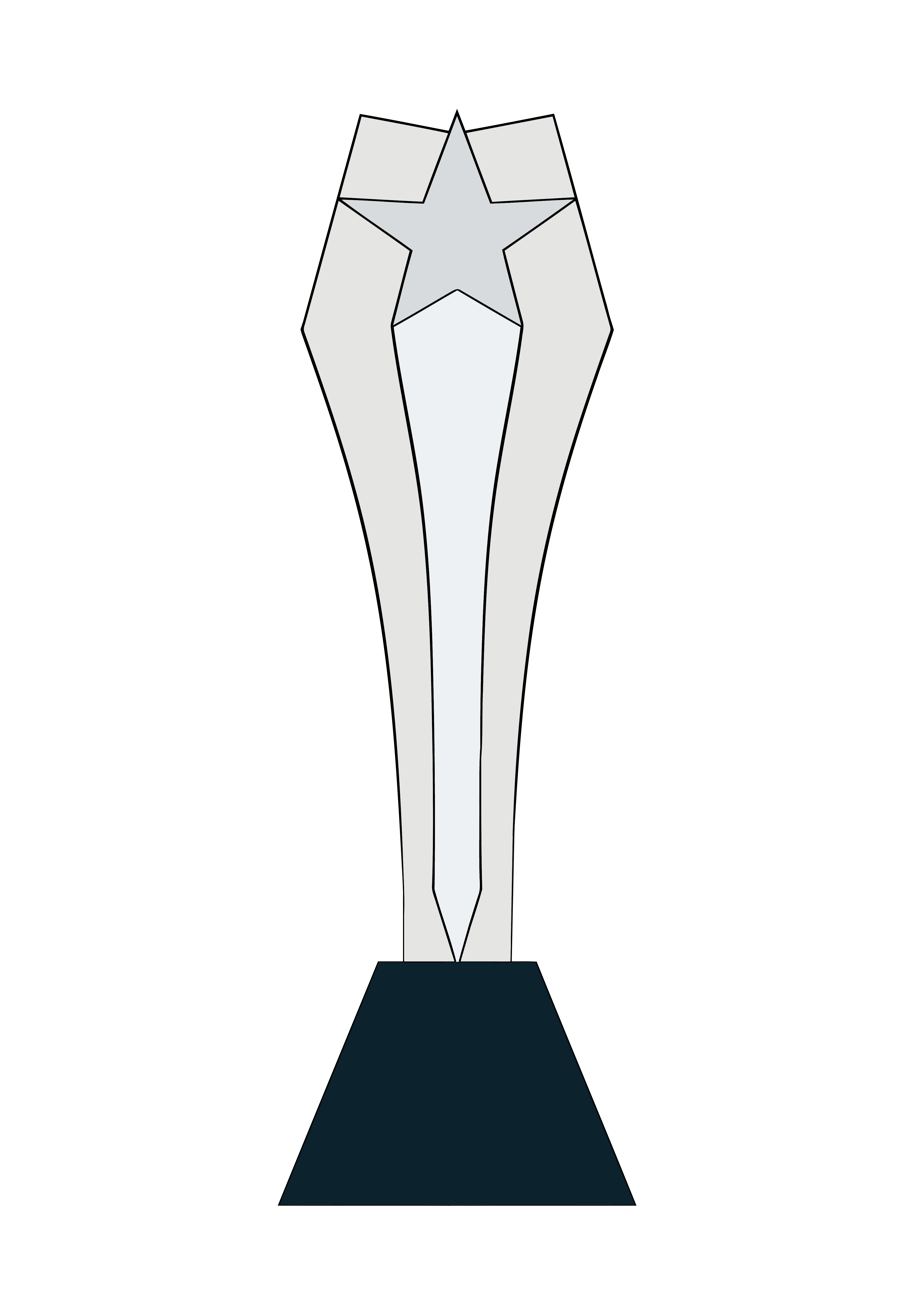
- Awarded for: The finest in cinematic and television achievements
- Country: United States, Canada
- Presented by: Critics Choice Association
- First award: 2018
- Website: www.criticschoice.com

The Celebration of Cinema and Television is an awards ceremony presented annually by the American–Canadian Critics Choice Association (CCA). The first ceremony was named Celebration of Black Cinema and Television to honor the finest in cinematic and television achievement by African Americans directors, producers, actors and musicians. Between 2021 and 2022 CCA has organized the Celebration of Latino Cinema and Television and the Celebration of Asian Pacific Cinema and Television, equivalent to the previous awards show, aimed to honor Latino, Asian Americans and Pacific Islander Americans communities. In 2023, the ceremonies were joined to Celebration of Cinema and Television: Honoring Black, Latino and AAPI Achievements, to celebrate the four communities in one special awards show. The following year, the first Celebration of LGBTQ+ Cinema and Television was held.

== History ==
In 2013, the Broadcast Film Critics Association partnered with TV One for a television special Celebration of Black Cinema at House of Blues to "expose the creativity and profitability of black cinema". The event was taken on January 7, 2014, and aired on television in February 2014, before the Critics Choice Movie Awards.

In 2018 the Broadcast Film Critics Association established the Celebration of Black Cinema as an award ceremony with special honors and achievements for black cinema. Since 2022 the ceremony has extended to television. In 2021 the association inaugurated the Celebration of Latino Cinema and Television. In 2022 the association launched the Celebration of Asian Pacific Cinema and television, to recognized "the outstanding talent from the Asian American Pacific Islander community".

In 2023 the association organized a special event named Celebration of Cinema and Television: Honoring Black, Latino and AAPI Achievements, which aimed to join the two ceremonies in one special awards show. On November 13, 2023, CCA CEO Joey Berlin announced that the ceremonies will return to individual shows in 2024.

== Categories ==
Main categories

- Director – Film
- Director – Television
- Director – Documentary Series
- Director – Animated Film
- Director – International Film
- Director – International Animated Film
- Breakthrough Director – Film
- Breakthrough Director – Television
- Producer – Film
- Producer – Television
- Music Award – Film
- Showrunner
- Actor – Film
- Supporting Actor – Film
- Actor – Television
- Actress – Film
- Actress – Television
- Breakthrough Actor – Film
- Breakthrough Actor – Television
- Breakthrough Actress – Film
- Breakthrough Actress – Television
- Ensemble Award –Television
- NextGen Award (2018–20)
- Rising Star – Film (Since 2021)
- Rising Star – Television (Since 2021)

Special achievements

- Career Achievement Award
- Melvin Van Peebles Trailblazer Award
- Special Honoree Award
- Icon Award
- Groundbreaker Award
- Visionary Award
- Social Justice Award

== Overview ==
Ceremony	#	Date	Host	Venue
Black	1st	January 7, 2014	—N/a	House of Blues
Black	2nd	December 2, 2019	Cheryl Boone Isaacs	Landmark Annex
Black	3rd	February 2, 2021	Bevy Smith	Virtual
Black	4th	December 6, 2021	Niecy Nash	Fairmont Century Plaza
Latino	1st	December 9, 2021	Cristela Alonzo	Fairmont Century Plaza
Asian Pacific	1st	November 4, 2022	Prashanth Venkataramanujam	Fairmont Century Plaza
Latino	2nd	November 13, 2022	Justina Machado	Fairmont Century Plaza
Black	5th	December 5, 2022	Bill Bellamy	Fairmont Century Plaza
Black, Latino, AAPI	—	December 4, 2023	Nicco Annan	Fairmont Century Plaza
LGBTQ+	1st	June 7, 2024	Sherry Cola	Fairmont Century Plaza
Asian Pacific	3rd	October 22, 2024	Kylie Mar	Grauman's Egyptian Theatre
Latino	4th	October 22, 2024	Justina Machado	Grauman's Egyptian Theatre
Black	7th	December 5, 2024	Jay Pharoah	Fairmont Century Plaza
LGBTQ+	2nd	June 6, 2025	Sherry Cola	Fairmont Century Plaza
Latino	5th	October 24, 2025	TBA	
Black	8th	December 9, 2025	TBA	

== Celebration of Black Cinema and Television ==
=== Celebration of Black Cinema ===
The inaugural Celebration of Black Cinema took place on January 7, 2014, at the House of Blues in West Hollywood. It honored cast and crew members from films such as 12 Years a Slave, 42, The Best Man Holiday, The Butler, Fruitvale Station, and Mandela: Long Walk to Freedom.

=== 2nd Celebration of Black Cinema ===
The 2nd Celebration of Black Cinema took place on December 2, 2019, at the Landmark Annex in Los Angeles, hosted by Cheryl Boone Isaacs.

- Career Achievement Award: Eddie Murphy
- Special Honoree Award: Nia Long
- Special Honorees: Chiwetel Ejiofor and Kasi Lemmons

=== 3rd Celebration of Black Cinema ===
The 3rd Celebration of Black Cinema took place on February 2, 2021, as a "virtual" ceremony because of COVID-19 pandemic in the United States.

- Career Achievement Award: Delroy Lindo
- Special Honoree Award: Andra Day
- Social Justice Award: Tommie Smith
- Director – Film: Shaka King for Judas and the Black Messiah
- Producer – Film: John Legend and Mike Jackson for Giving Voice
- Actress – Film: Tessa Thompson for Sylvie's Love
- Breakthrough Actor – Film: Yahya Abdul-Mateen II for The Trial of the Chicago 7
- Ensemble Award –Television: The cast of One Night in Miami...
- NextGen Award: Zendaya
- NextGen Award: John David Washington

=== 4th Celebration of Black Cinema and Television ===
The 4th Celebration of Black Cinema & Television took place on December 6, 2021, at the Fairmont Century Plaza Hotel in Los Angeles. The show was hosted by Niecy Nash and it was televised on KTLA in January 2022 and on Nexstar Media Group stations in February 2022. Since 2021 edition the awards has also been extended to television.

- Career Achievement Award: Halle Berry
- Trailblazer Award: Ava DuVernay
- Special Honoree Award: Natasha Rothwell
- Special Honoree Award: Kenan Thompson
- Special Honoree Award: Patina Miller
- Director – Film: Antoine Fuqua for The Guilty
- Producer – Television: Anthony Anderson for Black-ish
- Showrunner: Robin Thede for A Black Lady Sketch Show
- Actor – Film: Will Smith for King Richard
- Actress – Film: Jennifer Hudson for Respect
- Actor – Television: Omar Sy for Lupin
- Breakthrough Actor – Television: Toheeb Jimoh for Ted Lasso
- Ensemble Award: The cast of The Harder They Fall

=== 5th Celebration of Black Cinema and Television ===
The 5th Celebration of Black Cinema & Television took place on December 5, 2022, at the Fairmont Century Plaza Hotel in Los Angeles. The show was hosted by Bill Bellamy and it was televised on KTLA in January 2023 and on Nexstar Media Group stations in February 2023.

- Career Achievement Award: Angela Bassett
- Icon Award: Berry Gordy
- Trailblazer Award: Michael B. Jordan
- Groundbreaker Award: Scott ‘Kid Cudi’ Mescudi
- Director – Film: Gina Prince-Bythewood for The Woman King
- Breakthrough Director – Film: Nikyatu Jusu for Nanny
- Director – International Film: Tatiana Huezo
- Social Justice Award: Elegance Bratton for The Inspection
- Actor – Film: Jonathan Majors for Devotion
- Actress – Film: Danielle Deadwyler for Till
- Supporting Actor – Film: Brian Tyree Henry for Causeway
- Actor – Television: Nicco Annan for P-Valley
- Actress – Television: Quinta Brunson for Abbott Elementary
- Ensemble Award –Television: The cast of The Wonder Years
- Rising Star – Television: Ayo Edebiri for The Bear
- Rising Star – Television: Quincy Isaiah for Winning Time: The Rise of the Lakers Dynasty

=== 7th Celebration of Black Cinema and Television ===
The 7th Celebration of Black Cinema & Television took place on December 5, 2024, at the Fairmont Century Plaza Hotel in Los Angeles. The show was hosted by Jay Pharoah and it was televised on KTLA in January 2023 and on Nexstar Media Group stations in February 2025.

- Career Achievement Award: Malcolm D. Lee
- Icon Award: Tyler Perry
- Trailblazer Award: Regina King
- Social Impact Award: Aunjanue Ellis-Taylor
- Director – Film: Steve McQueen for Blitz
- Producer – Film: Natasha Rothwell for How to Die Alone
- Director – Documentary: Angela Patton and Natalie Rae for Daughters
- Composer Award : Kris Bowers for The Wild Robot
- Actor – Film: John David Washington for The Piano Lesson
- Actress – Film: Cynthia Erivo for Wicked
- Actor – Television: Wendell Pierce for Elsbeth
- Breakthrough Actor – Film: Jharrel Jerome for Unstoppable
- Rising Star – Film: Ryan Destiny for The Fire Inside
- Rising Star – Television: Michael Rainey Jr. for Power Book II: Ghost

=== 8th Celebration of Black Cinema and Television ===
The 8th Annual Celebration of Cinema & Television is set to take place on December 9, 2025, at the Fairmont Century Plaza in Los Angeles.

- Career Achievement Award: Spike Lee
- Director – Film: Ryan Coogler for Sinners
- Director – Documentary: Reginald Hudlin and Shola Lynch for Number One on the Call Sheet
- Comedy Award : Janelle James for Abbott Elementary
- Actress – Film: Tessa Thompson for Hedda
- Actor – Television: Sterling K. Brown for Paradise
- Actress – Television: Jurnee Smollett for Smoke
- Supporting Actor – Film: Damson Idris for F1
- Supporting Actress – Serie: Skye P. Marshall for Matlock
- Ensemble Award: Regina Hall, Teyana Taylor and Chase Infiniti for One Battle After Another
- Breakthrough Actress – Series: Tenika Davis for Spartacus: House of Ashur
- Rising Star – Film: Naya Desir-Johnson for Sarah's Oil

== Celebration of Latino Cinema and Television ==
=== 1st Celebration of Latino Cinema and Television ===
The 1st Celebration of Latino Cinema and Television took place on December 9, 2021, at the Fairmont Century Plaza in Los Angeles, and it was hosted by Cristela Alonzo.

- Career Achievement Award: Demián Bichir
- Icon Award: Rita Moreno
- Special Honoree Award: Natalie Morales
- Visionary Award: Lin-Manuel Miranda
- Director – Film: Reinaldo Marcus Green for King Richard
- Director – International Film: Tatiana Huezo for Prayers for the Stolen
- Music Award – Film: Gloria Estefan, Alex Lacamoire, Juan de Marcos González, Lin-Manuel Miranda and Ynairaly Simo for Vivo
- Actor – Film: Clifton Collins Jr. for Jockey
- Actress – Film: Olga Merediz for In the Heights
- Supporting Actor – Film: Eugenio Derbez for CODA

=== 2nd Celebration of Latino Cinema and Television ===
The 2nd Celebration of Latino Cinema and Television took place on November 13, 2022, at the Fairmont Century Plaza in Los Angeles, and it was hosted by Justina Machado.

- Career Achievement Award: Guillermo del Toro
- Icon Award: Desi Arnaz
- Special Honoree Award: Guillermo Rodriguez
- Director – Film: Alejandro González Iñárritu for Bardo
- Director – International Film: Santiago Mitre for Argentina, 1985
- Producer – Television: Gloria Calderón Kellett for With Love
- Actress – Film: Ana de Armas for Blonde
- Actor – Television: Laz Alonso for The Boys
- Actress – Television:Gina Torres for 9-1-1: Lone Star
- Breakthrough Actor – Television: Ismael Cruz Córdova for The Lord of the Rings: The Rings of Power
- Breakthrough Actress – Television: Catalina Sandino Moreno for From
- Rising Star – Film: Brandon Perea for Nope
- Rising Star – Television: Cristo Fernández for Ted Lasso
- Rising Star – Television: Jenna Ortega for Wednesday
- Rising Star – Television: Gloria Calderón Kellett for With Love

=== 4th Celebration of Latino Cinema and Television ===
The 4th Celebration of Latino Cinema and Television took place on October 22, 2024 at the Grauman's Egyptian Theatre in Hollywood, and it was hosted by Justina Machado.

- Vanguard Award: Fede Álvarez for Alien: Romulus
- Director – Film: Pablo Larraín for Maria
- Director – Series: Issa López for True Detective: Night Country
- Showrunner Award: Francesca Sloane for Mr. & Mrs. Smith
- Actress – Film: Adriana Barraza for My Penguin Friend
- Actress – International Film: Fernanda Torres for I'm Still Here
- Actor – Television: Reasonable Doubt
- Actress – Television: Emayatzy Corinealdi for
- Groundbreaker Award: Zoe Saldaña for Emilia Pérez
- Breakthrough Actor – Television: Ramón Rodríguez for Will Trent
- Comedy Series Award: Acapulco
- International Series Award: Familia de Medianoche (Midnight Family)

=== 5th Celebration of Latino Cinema and Television ===
The 5th Celebration of Latino Cinema and Television is set to take place on October 24, 2025, in Beverly Hills. The winners were announced on September 17.

- Icon Award: Dolores Huerta
- Vanguard Award: Andy Garcia for Landman
- Trailblazer Award: America Ferrera for The Lost Bus
- Director: Kleber Mendonça Filho for The Secret Agent
- Showrunner: Frida Perez for The Studio
- Actor – Film: Oscar Isaac for Frankenstein
- Supporting Actor – Film: Anthony Ramos for A House of Dynamite
- Supporting Actor – Television: Gabriel Luna for Devil in Disguise: John Wayne Gacy
- Breakthrough Actor: Tonatiuh for Kiss of the Spider Woman
- Breakthrough Actress: Camila Perez for Acapulco

== Celebration of Asian Pacific Cinema and Television ==
=== 1st Celebration of Asian Pacific Cinema and Television ===
The 1st Celebration of Asian Pacific Cinema and Television took place on November 4, 2022, at the Fairmont Century Plaza in Los Angeles.

- Icon Award: James Hong
- Trailblazer Award: Karyn Kusama
- Social Justice Award: David Siev
- Director – Film: Park Chan-wook for Decision to Leave
- Director – Television: Hwang Dong-hyuk for Squid Game
- Director – Animated Film: Domee Shi for Turning Red
- Showrunner: Soo Hugh for Pachinko
- Actor – Film: John Cho for Don't Make Me Go
- Actor – Television: Nick Mohammed for Ted Lasso
- Actress – Television: Zoë Chao for The Afterparty
- Breakthrough Actor – Film: Joel Kim Booster for Fire Island
- Breakthrough Actress – Film: Li Jun Li for Babylon
- Breakthrough Actress – Television: Élodie Yung for The Cleaning Lady
- Ensemble Award –Television: The cast of Ms. Marvel
- Rising Star – Film: Auliʻi Cravalho for Crush
- Rising Star – Television: Park Eun-bin for Extraordinary Attorney Woo

=== 3rd Celebration of Asian Pacific Cinema and Television ===
The 3rd Celebration of Asian Pacific Cinema and Television took place on October 22, 2024 at the Grauman's Egyptian Theatre in Hollywood.

- Career Achievement Award: Joan Chen
- Trailblazer Award: Lee Jung-jae
- Industry Leadership Award: Julia S. Gouw
- Comedy Award: Ronny Chieng for The Daily Show
- Producer – Film: Samantha Quan for Anora
- Supporting Actress – Film: Dolly de Leon for Ghostlight
- Actor – Television: Utkarsh Ambudkar for Ghosts
- Supporting Actor – Television: Ken Leung for Industry
- Breakthrough Actor – Television: Jimmy O. Yang for Interior Chinatown
- Animation Award: David Derrick Jr., Jason Hand, Dana Ledoux Miller, Christina Chen and Yvett Merino for Moana 2
- Documentary Award: Sue Kim for The Last of the Sea Women
- Rising Star – Television: Kekoa Scott Kekumano for Rescue: HI-Surf

== Celebration of Cinema and Television: Honoring Black, Latino and AAPI Achievements ==
The Celebration of Cinema and Television: Honoring Black, Latino and AAPI Achievements took place on December 4, 2023, at the Fairmont Century Plaza in Los Angeles.

- Career Achievement Award: Sheryl Lee Ralph
- Icon Award: Edward James Olmos
- Trailblazer Award: Ken Jeong
- Groundbreaker Award: America Ferrera
- Visionary Award: Jeffrey Wright
- Breakthrough Director – Film: Eva Longoria for Flamin' Hot
- Breakthrough Director – Television: Lee Sung-jin for Beef
- Director – Documentary Series: Allen Hughes for Dear Mama
- Director – Animated Film: Kemp Powers for Spider-Man: Across the Spider-Verse
- Director – International Animated Film: Makoto Shinkai for Suzume
- Producer – Film: Charles D. King for They Cloned Tyrone
- Actor – Film: Colman Domingo for Rustin
- Actress – Film: Greta Lee for Past Lives
- Supporting Actress – Film: Da'Vine Joy Randolph for The Holdovers
- Actor – Television: Damson Idris for Snowfall
- Supporting Actress – Television: Jessica Williams for Shrinking
- Supporting Actor – Television: Oscar Montoya for Minx
- Breakthrough Actress – Film: Teyana Taylor for A Thousand and One
- Breakthrough Actor – Television: Charles Melton for May December
- Breakthrough Actress – Television: Camila Morrone for Daisy Jones & the Six
- Ensemble Award: The cast of The Color Purple
- Rising Star – Film: Xolo Maridueña for The Blue Beetle
- Rising Star – Television: Keivonn Woodard for The Last of Us

== Celebration of LGBTQ+ Cinema and Television ==
=== 1st Celebration of LGBTQ+ Cinema and Television ===
The 1st Celebration of LGBTQ+ Cinema and Television took place on June 7, 2024, at the Fairmont Century Plaza in Los Angeles, hosted by Sherry Cola. It aired on Here TV.

- Career Achievement Award: Nathan Lane
- Social Justice Award: George Takei
- Industry Leadership Award: Henry R. Muñoz III
- Trailblazer Award: RuPaul's Drag Race
- Vanguard Award: Michaela Jaé Rodriguez for Loot
- Producer: Matt Bomer, Daniel Manahan, Ron Nyswaner, and Robbie Rogers for Fellow Travelers
- Director: Oliver Hermanus for Mary & George
- Showrunner: Abe Sylvia for Palm Royale
- Writer – Television: Shakina for Quantum Leap
- Supporting Performance – Television: Carl Clemons-Hopkins for Hacks
- Breakthrough Director: Luke Gilford for National Anthem
- Breakthrough Performance – Television: Chris Perfetti for Abbott Elementary
- Breakthrough Performance – Limited Series: Nava Mau for Baby Reindeer
- Rising Star: Fernando Carsa for Acapulco
- TV Host: Kristen Kish for Top Chef
- Reality TV: Johnnie Ingram, Stephen Warren, Peter LoGreco, Sasha Velour, Priyanka, Jaida Essence Hall, and Latrice Royale for We're Here

=== 2nd Celebration of LGBTQ+ Cinema and Television ===
The 2nd Celebration of LGBTQ+ Cinema and Television took place on June 6, 2025, at the Fairmont Century Plaza in Los Angeles, hosted by Sherry Cola and airing on Here TV.

- Career Achievement Award: Wanda Sykes
- Industry Leadership Award: Howard Cohen and Eric d'Arbeloff
- Groundbreaker Award: Niecy Nash-Betts for Grotesquerie
- Trailblazer Award: Michael Urie for Shrinking
- Comedy Award: Bowen Yang for Saturday Night Live
- Vanguard Award: Nathan Lee Graham for Mid-Century Modern
- Documentary Award: Harper Steele, Will Ferrell, and Josh Greenbaum for Will & Harper
- Ensemble Award: Bridget Everett, Jeff Hiller, Murray Hill, Mary Catherine Garrison, and Tim Bagley for Somebody Somewhere
- Supporting Performance – Television: Tramell Tillman for Severance
- Supporting Performance – Comedy: Gideon Glick for Étoile
- Breakthrough Performance – Television: Megan Stalter for Hacks
- Breakthrough Performance – Limited Series: Sasheer Zamata for Agatha All Along
- Rising Star: Liv Hewson for Yellowjackets, Benito Skinner for Overcompensating

=== 3rd Celebration of LGBTQ+ Cinema and Television ===
The 3rd Celebration of LGBTQ+ Cinema and Television took place on May 29, 2026 in Los Angeles.

- Groundbreaker Award: Jane Lynch for Celebrity Weakest Link
- Trailblazer Award: Paula Pell for The 'Burbs
- Vanguard Award: Dan Levy for Big Mistakes
- Breakthrough Performance: Noah Schnapp for Stranger Things
- Performance – Drama: Bre-Z for All American
- Performance – Comedy: Hannah Einbinder for Hacks
- Supporting Performance – Comedy: Brandon Scott Jones for Ghosts
- Ensemble Award: Kerrice Brooks, Karim Diané, Tig Notaro, and Gina Yashere for Star Trek: Starfleet Academy
- Director Award: Dearbhla Walsh for Margo's Got Money Troubles
- Showrunner Award: Jacob Tierney for Heated Rivalry
- Reality TV Award: Boulet Brothers for Dragula: Titans
