= Star Trek: Starfleet Academy =

American science fiction television series

- Genre: Drama; Science fiction
- Created by: Gaia Violo
- Based on: Star Trek by Gene Roddenberry
- Showrunners: Alex Kurtzman; Noga Landau
- Starring: Holly Hunter; Sandro Rosta; Karim Diané; Kerrice Brooks; George Hawkins; Bella Shepard; Oded Fehr; Gina Yashere; Brit Marling; Stephen Colbert; Robert Picardo; Tig Notaro; Zoë Steiner
- Composer: Jeff Russo
- Country of origin: United States
- Original language: English
- No. of seasons: 1
- No. of episodes: 10

Production
- Executive producers: Alex Kurtzman; Noga Landau; Aaron Baiers; Eugene Roddenberry; Trevor Roth; Frank Siracusa; John Weber; Olatunde Osunsanmi; Gaia Violo; Jenny Lumet; Michelle Paradise
- Producer: Norman Denver
- Production location: Toronto, Canada
- Cinematography: Tommy Maddox-Upshaw
- Editor: Jon Dudkowski
- Running time: 60–75 minutes
- Production companies: Secret Hideout; Warm Blood Sunday Productions; Roddenberry Entertainment; CBS Studios

Original release
- Network: Paramount+
- Release: January 15, 2026 – present

Related
- Star Trek TV series; Star Trek: Discovery

Star Trek: Starfleet Academy is an American television series created by Gaia Violo for the streaming service Paramount+. It is the 12th Star Trek series and part of executive producer Alex Kurtzman's expanded Star Trek Universe. Set in the 32nd century, the far-future time period that was introduced in the later seasons of the series Star Trek: Discovery (2017–2024), Starfleet Academy follows the first new class of Starfleet cadets in over a century as they come of age and train to be officers.

Sandro Rosta, Karim Diané, Kerrice Brooks, George Hawkins, and Bella Shepard portray Starfleet Academy cadets, starring alongside Holly Hunter and Zoë Steiner, as well as Tig Notaro and Oded Fehr, who are reprising their roles from Discovery, and Robert Picardo returning as the character of the Doctor from Star Trek: Voyager. Versions of a Starfleet Academy-based series were in development for years before it received an official series order in March 2023, with Kurtzman and Noga Landau as showrunners. Production on the first season took place from August 2024 to February 2025 at Pinewood Toronto Studios in Toronto, Canada, with production of the second season following from August 2025 to February 2026.

Star Trek: Starfleet Academy premiered on the streaming service Paramount+ on January 15, 2026, with its first two episodes. The other eight episodes of the first season were released weekly through March 12. Despite receiving generally favorable critic reviews, the series was the subject of review bombing upon its initial release. In March 2026, CBS and Paramount+ announced that the upcoming second season, which is expected to premiere in March 2027, would be the series' last.

== Premise ==
The series is set in the 32nd century, the far-future of the Star Trek franchise where Starfleet and the United Federation of Planets are recovering from a cataclysmic event, as depicted in Star Trek: Discovery (2017–2024). Starfleet Academy follows the first new class of Starfleet cadets in over a century as they come of age and train to be officers. They are taught aboard the USS Athena, a starship that docks at the Starfleet Academy campus in San Francisco but can also be deployed with the rest of the fleet.

== Cast and characters ==
=== Main ===
- Holly Hunter as Nahla Ake:
  The half-Lanthanite captain of the USS Athena and the chancellor of Starfleet Academy. Hunter enjoyed the dichotomy of playing both a captain and a teacher, saying the captain "is there to command, to analyze in emergency situations, and then to delegate" while the chancellor "is there to guide, to collaborate, and have tremendous empathy". She also enjoyed developing relationships with each of the cadets.
- Sandro Rosta as Caleb Mir:
  A human who is disillusioned with Starfleet and has been on the run alone for most of his life. He joins the academy as part of a journey to find his mother. Rosta said Caleb is an outsider who is introduced to Starfleet's values at the academy, allowing the audience to learn about Starfleet through his eyes. Co-showrunner Alex Kurtzman said Caleb's relationship with Ake was a key part of the series.
- Karim Diané as Jay-Den Kraag:
  A Klingon cadet and aspiring medical officer. Diané reached out to Michael Dorn and Doug Jones, who respectively portrayed Worf and Saru in previous Star Trek media, about performing with the prosthetics needed to portray a Star Trek alien. His Klingon prosthetics initially took five hours to apply each day, but this was reduced to two hours by the end of the first season. Kraag is noted as Star Trek's first depiction of an openly gay Klingon.
- Kerrice Brooks as Sam (Series Acclimation Mil):
  The first Kasqian to attend Starfleet Academy. Kasqians are a kind of hologram, and Brooks explained that Sam is only weeks old but was programmed to be a young adult. She said the character is "like a newborn; everything is so fresh to her" and she "brings absolutely no baggage". Kurtzman said the character was originally written to be quite different, and was changed to match Brooks's approach after her casting.
- George Hawkins as Darem Reymi: A Khionian cadet and aspiring captain. Darem is from a wealthy home world which gives him certain expectations for his time at Starfleet Academy.
- Bella Shepard as Genesis Lythe: A Dar-Sha cadet who is the daughter of an admiral, and is determined to make her own name in Starfleet
- Oded Fehr as Charles Vance: The human Fleet Admiral, the commander-in-chief of Starfleet
- Gina Yashere as Lura Thok: The part Klingon, part Jem'Hadar first officer of the Athena and the cadet master at Starfleet Academy
- Brit Marling as the voice of the USS Athena's computer
- Stephen Colbert as the voice of Starfleet Academy's Digital Dean of Students who gives daily announcements and important alerts to the cadets
- Robert Picardo as the Doctor:
  A 900-year-old holographic teacher at Starfleet Academy. Picardo said it was "mind-bending" to portray a character with such a long, digital memory that clearly remembers the "36 generations of organic colleagues" that have lived and died since his time on the original USS Voyager in the series Star Trek: Voyager (1995–2001). Picardo said the Doctor in Starfleet Academy is "as we remember him, but deeper". Kurtzman decided to add the character to the series after he worked well as a teacher for young cadets in the animated series Star Trek: Prodigy (2021–2024), believing it made sense for the Doctor to still have that role in the future.
- Tig Notaro as Jett Reno: A human instructor at Starfleet Academy
- Zoë Steiner as Tarima Sadal: The daughter of the president of Betazed, and a cadet at the War College and later Starfleet Academy.

=== Recurring ===
- Paul Giamatti as Nustopher "Nus" Braka, a part-Klingon, part-Tellarite who has an ominous past connection to one of the cadets. Kurtzman said the character "represents a tide that has swept across the world in a very profound and upsetting way", reflecting a real-world rise in people who use hate to sow division and oppose empathy. Giamatti enjoyed the lengthy make-up process, saying it helped him get into character.
- Tatiana Maslany as Anisha Mir, Caleb's mother
- Raoul Bhaneja as Chancellor Kelrec, head of Starfleet's War College
- Romeo Carere as Ocam Sadal, Tarima's brother and the son of the president of Betazed
- Alexander Eiling as B'Avi, a Vulcan War College cadet who becomes rivals with Caleb and the rest of the academy cadets
- Dale Whibley as Kyle Jokovic, a friendly War College cadet who becomes romantically interested in Jay-Den

=== Guest ===
- Mary Wiseman as Sylvia Tilly: An instructor at Starfleet Academy who served on the USS Discovery
- Rebecca Quin as Lieutenant Ya, a member of the USS Athena's bridge crew
- Jeremy Culhane, Brian David Gilbert, and Rekha Shankar as the voices of DOT robots
- Cirroc Lofton as Jake Sisko
- Tawny Newsome as Illa Dax, an instructor and the current host of the Dax symbiont.

== Episodes ==
Season	Episodes	Originally released	
Season	Episodes	First released	Last released
1	10	January 15, 2026	March 12, 2026
2	10	March 2027	TBA

=== Season 1 (2026) ===
No. overall	No. in season	Title	Directed by	Written by	Original release date
1	1	"Kids These Days"	Alex Kurtzman	Gaia Violo	January 15, 2026
Detained on an industrial colony, Caleb Mir and his mother Anisha are awaiting trial along with the pirate Nus Braka, after a Starfleet officer has been killed during their attempt to steal food. Braka is sentenced to jail and Anisha to a rehab facility, separating her from Caleb. Judge Nahla Ake promises to look after him, but he escapes at Anisha's urging. Fifteen years later, Ake has resigned from Starfleet out of shame over the trial. She is offered the position of commandant of the newly re-established Starfleet Academy. Finding Caleb, who has become a criminal while searching for his mother, Ake offers him a place at the academy in exchange for her help locating Anisha, who escaped her sentence the year before. Caleb accepts and joins other new students, including Jay-Den, Sam, Darem, and Genesis. During their journey aboard the USS Athena to the campus in San Francisco, Caleb hacks the ship's communication to contact his mother. The signal is intercepted by Braka, who claims to have escaped his sentence with Anisha. He attacks and disables the Athena, but the cadets and officers work together to repel him. The ship ultimately arrives at the campus safely.
2	2	"Beta Test"	Alex Kurtzman	Noga Landau & Jane Maggs	January 15, 2026
Chancellor Ake welcomes the incoming Starfleet Academy class, contrasting them with the more militarized War College remaining after the Burn. The cadets are assigned roommates, with Caleb and Darem complaining about being placed together. Following Braka's claims that Anisha was once on Goja V, Caleb and Ake find no record of this planet. Ake and Admiral Vance prepare for a delegation from Betazed, which left the Federation after the Burn. Betazed's president dismisses the Federation's requests, arguing that its needs are not met. Caleb meets Tarima, the president's daughter and leader of a youth organization advocating for rejoining the Federation. During a campus tour, she reveals to him that Goja V is actually an asteroid within Betazed's defense system. When she learns Caleb's motive for asking, she assumes he used her and becomes angry. Inspired by Caleb, Ake proposes relocating the Federation's governmental center to Betazed if it joins, and the Betazoids accept. Tarima chooses to enroll in the War College, while her brother Ocam joins Starfleet Academy and becomes a roommate for Caleb and Darem. Ake informs Caleb that Starfleet Intelligence confirms his mother escaped Goja V.
3	3	"Vitus Reflux"	Doug Aarniokoski	Alex Taub & Kiley Rossetter	January 22, 2026
The cadets are introduced to Calica, a realistic team combat game. War College cadets use transporters to embarrass Caleb, Darem, Genesis, and Sam. Chancellor Ake advises her cadets to learn how to make war by gardening, and introduces them to the protected vitus reflux plant, which emulates a person's emotions. Caleb learns Tarima has enrolled in the War College and is angry she did not tell him, but later reconciles. War College cadets hack Starfleet Academy's Calica training footage, and embarrass its cadets by displaying it all over campus. Darem and Genesis compete to be Calica team captain, and Darem wins. Darem challenges Dzolo and her War College team to a game of Calica. The two teams play in the academy atrium at night. Darem's leadership is poor, and he is disqualified for fighting. Genesis takes leadership, and Starfleet Academy's team scores against the War College's. Ake admonishes her cadets, but makes subtle suggestions about how her cadets should retaliate. Taking her hints, the Starfleet Academy cadets plant the fungus in the dormitory rooms of the War College, and feed it fast-growth chemicals. The fungus grows to enormous size, terrifying the War College cadets. Starfleet Academy wins the prank war.
4	4	"Vox in Excelso"	Doug Aarniokoski	Gaia Violo & Eric Anthony Glover	January 29, 2026
Klingon cadet Jay-Den Kraag learns that his family may have been killed in a starship crash on their way to a refugee camp. During the Burn, Qo'noS and the Klingon Empire were destroyed, leaving the Klingons an endangered species facing extinction. As the cadets engage in a series of debates on the topic, Admiral Vance enlists Chancellor Ake's help to propose a solution to Klingon General Obel Wochak, an ex-lover of hers: asylum on Faan Alpha, a potential new homeworld in Federation space with conditions virtually identical to Qo'noS. However, the Klingons refuse to take what they see as charity and per tradition will only accept the planet via conquest. Jay-Den struggles with the memories of his brother Thar's death and his family's subsequent abandonment of Jay-Den before Cadet Master Thok gives him a new perspective on things. At Jay-Den's suggestion, Vance and Ake stage a battle with Obel, allowing the Klingons to claim their new home by conquest. Jay-Den is honored as a true warrior by Obel who reveals that his family survived the crash.
5	5	"Series Acclimation Mil"	Larry Teng	Kirsten Beyer & Tawny Newsome	February 5, 2026
Due to her own work as an emissary for the Makers, SAM becomes obsessed with the mystery of Benjamin Sisko, the Emissary of the Prophets who vanished at the end of the Dominion War. At the same time, Ake helps War College Chancellor Kelrec prepare for an important meeting with another chancellor with the help of the Doctor and Reno in an effort to make peace between them. Kelrec reveals that he feels that Ake abandoned Starfleet, leading to his animosity towards her. SAM's efforts are unsuccessful, but Professor Illa shares with her Jake Sisko's book Anslem, and SAM has an interaction with Jake through it. Illa reveals that she's Illa Dax, the current host of the Dax symbiont who was friends with Sisko.
6	6	"Come, Let's Away"	Larry Teng	Kenneth Lin & Kiley Rossetter	February 12, 2026
Starfleet Academy and War College cadets participate in a routine training exercise aboard the derelict USS Miyazaki, which contains an experimental singularity drive that disabled the ship a century ago, killing its crew. Aliens called Furies board the Miyazaki and take the cadets hostage. Vance and Ake make a deal for assistance with Nus Braka, who has fought Furies before. Braka recommends sonic weapons and Vance suggests using a weapon carried by the USS Sargasso, which is called away from Starbase J-19 Alpha, an experimental weapons facility, to join the battle. After the Furies disable the Sargasso, Starfleet rescues the cadets with help from Tarima, who telepathically communicates with Caleb and through this connection kills the Furies, though this effort leaves her comatose, and Vulcan cadet B'Avi is killed in the battle. The entire event is revealed to have been a plot by Braka, who staged the attack upon the Miyazaki in order to lure the Sargasso away from the starbase so that he could have the starbase ransacked, inflicting mass casualties in the process. Ake receives a message from Nus Braka in which he taunts her on the success of his scheme.
7	7	"Ko'Zeine"	Andi Armaganian	Alex Taub & Eric Anthony Glover	February 19, 2026
The academy cadets go on a four-day break. As Darem is apparently abducted through a portal, Jay-Den, witnessing this, follows, only to learn that this was a Khionian pre-wedding ritual, and that Darem is scheduled to be co-ruler of Khionia with his fiancée, Kaira, several years after he graduates. Daren then names Jay-Den is his Ko'Zeine, or best man. Caleb remains on campus to relax. Though he worries about Tarima, who is recovering on Betazed following the events aboard the Miyazaki, he has not communicated with her since that incident, having deleted his draft attempts. Caleb is joined by Genesis, who is worried about Captain Ake nominating her for the Pre-Command Track. They break into the Athena bridge, where Caleb attempts to talk her out of hacking the main computer, but Reno catches them and summons Ake back from vacation to deal with them. Jay-Den gives a speech at the wedding reception complementing Darem's dedication to duty but Darem's fiancée realizes that he is no longer the man she knew, and insists they end the marriage. Ake sentences Caleb and Genesis to manual labor. Caleb finally sends a message to Tarima telling how he actually feels about her.
8	8	"The Life of the Stars"	Andi Armaganian	Gaia Violo & Jane Maggs	February 26, 2026
With the cadets struggling with their experiences, Ake calls in Sylvia Tilly to help bring them back together through the play Our Town. Tarima finally returns, but is transferred to Starfleet Academy and has trouble dealing with the changes. Tarima has an emotional meltdown and nearly leaves, but chooses to stay in the end as everyone comes closer together than ever. SAM's glitching threatens her life, so the Doctor and Ake take her to her homeworld Kasq in hopes that SAM's Makers can save her, but she is damaged beyond their ability to repair. The Doctor reveals that SAM reminds him of his daughter Belle and the Doctor has been trying to avoid making any more attachments to deal with the emotional pain of his infinite lifespan and the numerous losses that it carries. The Doctor and Ake realize that because the Makers programmed SAM without a childhood, she lacked the resilience that comes with it and was overloaded by her trauma. SAM is rebuilt with the Doctor spending seventeen years on Kasq – equal to two weeks on Earth – raising her as his daughter before they return to Starfleet.
9	9	"300th Night"	Jonathan Frakes	Teleplay by : Kirsten Beyer; Story by : Kirsten Beyer & Kenneth Lin	March 5, 2026
At the end of the academic year, the cadets perform a Klingon ritual declaring themselves as a chosen family, though Caleb declines. At the same time, Starfleet pulls back after learning that Braka has weaponized the apocalyptic Omega molecule. Finally accessing a message from Anisha, Caleb with Darem, SAM and Genesis, goes after her on a planet in Venari Ral space, followed by Ake, Reno, the Doctor and stowaways Jay-Den and Tarima. Having found his mother, Caleb considers abandoning Starfleet, but goes back when his friends are in trouble. The group is rescued by the Athena, and they discover that Braka has boxed the Federation in with Omega mines, leaving only the Athena – crewed only by the cadets, Ake, Reno, and the Doctor – on the outside. As Ake is reunited with a frightened Anisha, Reno broadcasts a distress call to all Federation ships.
10	10	"Rubincon"	Olatunde Osunsanmi	Teleplay by : Alex Kurtzman & Kirsten Beyer; Story by : Noga Landau & Gaia Violo	March 12, 2026
While the Athena is on her own, Vance and Thok reveal that Braka is organizing a cartel of non-member worlds to pillage the Federation. Braka catches up and captures Ake and Anisha, before seemingly destroying the Athena. The Doctor projects an illusion of a destroyed ship, but is left glitching and unable to communicate clearly. As Braka holds a trial for the Federation, Reno and the cadets work together to repair the ship, track Braka and bring down the wall. Anisha and Ake face their mutual past with Caleb joining them to buy more time. Ake and Caleb expose the fact that the destruction of Braka's homeworld, for which he blames the Federation, was caused by Braka's father, discrediting him. SAM is able to decipher the Doctor's words and deactivate the mines, and Vance arrives with the entire fleet to force the Venari Ral to surrender and to arrest Braka. The fleet finally arrives at Betazed for the dedication ceremony of the new Federation capital and Caleb reconciles with his friends, planning to spend the summer traveling with Anisha before coming back for his second year.

=== Season 2 ===
No. overall	No. in season	Title	Directed by	Written by	Original release date
11	1	TBA	Olatunde Osunsanmi	Teleplay by : Jane Maggs & Jenny Lumet; Story by : Alex Kurtzman	March 2027

The next eight episodes were written by Alex Taub & Tawny Newsome, Eric Anthony Glover, Kiley Rossetter, Joshua Levy & Prathi Srinivasan, Gaia Violo & Alex Taub, Jenny Lumet with the teleplay by Jane Maggs & Alex Kurtzman, Lauriel Harte Marger, and Kirsten Beyer, respectively. Osunsanmi and Kurtzman directed the final two episodes respectively.

== Production ==
=== Background ===
Ideas for a Star Trek production centering on cadets at Starfleet Academy have circulated for decades, taking two main forms: prequel origin stories of established characters, and spin‑offs with new protagonists.

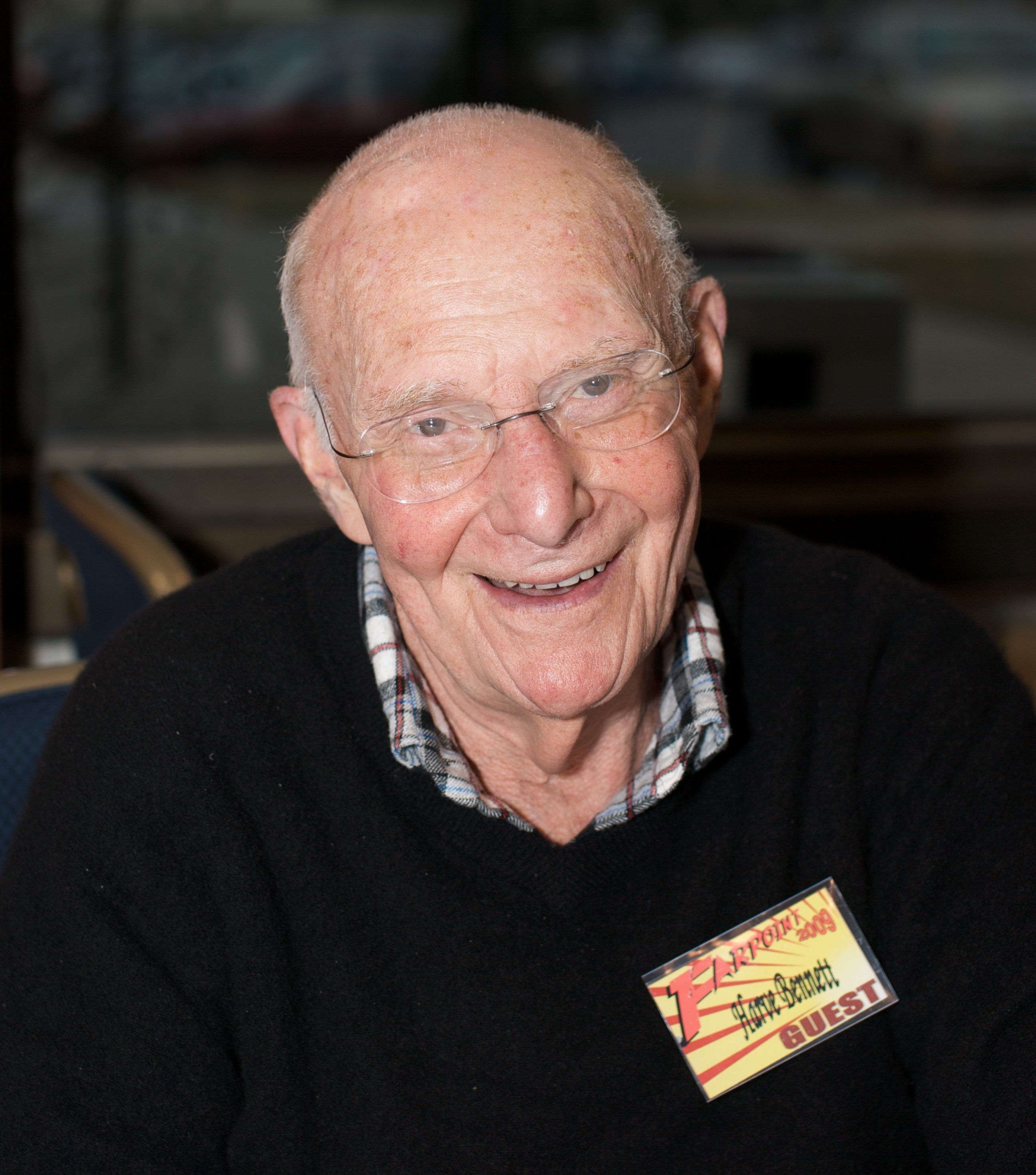
Harve Bennett, producer of Star Trek II–V and developer of early Starfleet Academy film proposals

According to writers Judith and Garfield Reeves-Stevens, Star Trek creator and producer Gene Roddenberry mentioned at the 1968 World Science Fiction Convention that he was considering a feature film about how Kirk and the crew of The Original Series (1966–69) first met at Starfleet Academy. When he ultimately produced The Motion Picture (1979), it was set after TOS, with its visibly aged cast portraying largely unchanged characters. Star Trek II (1982) already foregrounded younger Starfleet trainees, especially Saavik, in a supervised exercise with the veteran TOS crew. After Star Trek III (1984), William Shatner was initially reluctant to return as Kirk. In response, writer-director Leonard Nimoy and producer Harve Bennett explored alternative premises for the fourth film. Among the proposals considered by Paramount was a Starfleet Academy prequel developed by Bennett and Ralph Winter, chronicling the early years of Kirk, Spock, and other established TOS characters, thereby recasting the core crew while allowing for Nimoy's Spock to appear either as narrator in a frame story or through a time-travel device. After seven to eight months, the issue with Shatner was settled and the prequel idea was set aside.

In the mid-1980s, as Paramount developed a new Star Trek TV series set a century after TOS, the studio initially commissioned writer/producer duo Sam and Gregory Strangis. The latter recalled envisioning a "Starfleet Academy on a ship", combining younger trainees with senior officer instructors. A 1986 Paramount memo outlined this precursor concept for Star Trek: The Next Generation.

Finalizing Star Trek V (1989), Bennett – encouraged by Paramount executive Ned Tanen – commissioned David Loughery to write a Starfleet Academy-centered script for the sixth film, planned for release in 1991. The storyline would have brought the young Kirk, Spock, and McCoy together at the academy for their first space adventure, involving a new struggle against slavery. According to a 1991 Cinefantastique interview with Bennett, one draft framed the prequel within a sequel narrative in which Shatner's Kirk considered a teaching appointment at the academy and reflected on his past while speaking with new cadets, later joined by Nimoy's Spock. Titled The Academy Years, another draft (reviewed by Ain't It Cool News in 2006) instead had opened with Kelley's McCoy addressing the cadets, and emphasized coming‑of‑age themes including Kirk's early romantic experiences, his impulsive behavior as a trainee pilot, young Spock's encounters with xenophobia from fellow cadets, and moments of mutual support and moral ambiguity between the protagonists, culminating in a political conflict that forced the cadets into their early field mission. The project was turned down by Paramount's Frank Mancuso. With TNG unfolding a storyline about Wesley's Starfleet Academy career, the concept briefly resurfaced as one of several spin-off options discussed in the early 1990s, along with the space-station premise that ultimately became Deep Space Nine.

As the concept shifted largely to tie-in media, several young‑adult novel series in the 1990s explored prequel stories for TV-series regular characters, such as Star Trek: Starfleet Academy (for TOS), Star Trek: The Next Generation – Starfleet Academy, and Star Trek: Voyager – Starfleet Academy. One early comic book titled Starfleet Academy! (DC, 1991) explored Kirk's academy years in a flashback. Another comic book spin‑off titled Starfleet Academy (Marvel, 1996–98), set within the DS9 continuity, followed recurring character Nog and his new group of cadets known as 'Omega Squad'. The concept also appeared in interactive media, including Interplay's 1997 FMV computer game Starfleet Academy (a follow-up to the similarly named 1995 console game). Featuring original Enterprise crew members – Kirk, Sulu, and Chekov, played by Shatner, George Takei, and Walter Koenig – in instructional roles, the story introduces Cadet David Forrester and his diverse classmates as they confront tensions with Klingons, Romulans, and Gorn pirates, uncovering a clandestine xenophobic faction within the Federation named 'Vanguard'. A tie-in novelization was published by Diane Carey the same year.

In the 2000s, Shatner, together with the Reeves-Stevens writing duo, developed a pitch for a TV series titled Star Trek: The Academy, following teenage versions of Kirk, Spock, and McCoy. It was reportedly proposed in 2003 and rejected by Paramount's Sumner Redstone. The concept was reworked and partially realized within Shatner's Star Trek novel line. According to a 2006 UGO interview, Bennett in 2004 again proposed a Starfleet Academy feature film to Paramount's Sherry Lansing. She responded positively and supported the idea, although it was declined at the television division's request shortly before her departure. (In a 2010 interview, Bennett recalled a similar exchange with Lansing in the 1990s.) The 2009 Star Trek reboot partially touched on the characters' time at the academy, echoing themes from the early concept. Following the Kelvin timeline established with this film, a series of Starfleet Academy novels and IDW comics was released in the 2010s.

=== Development ===
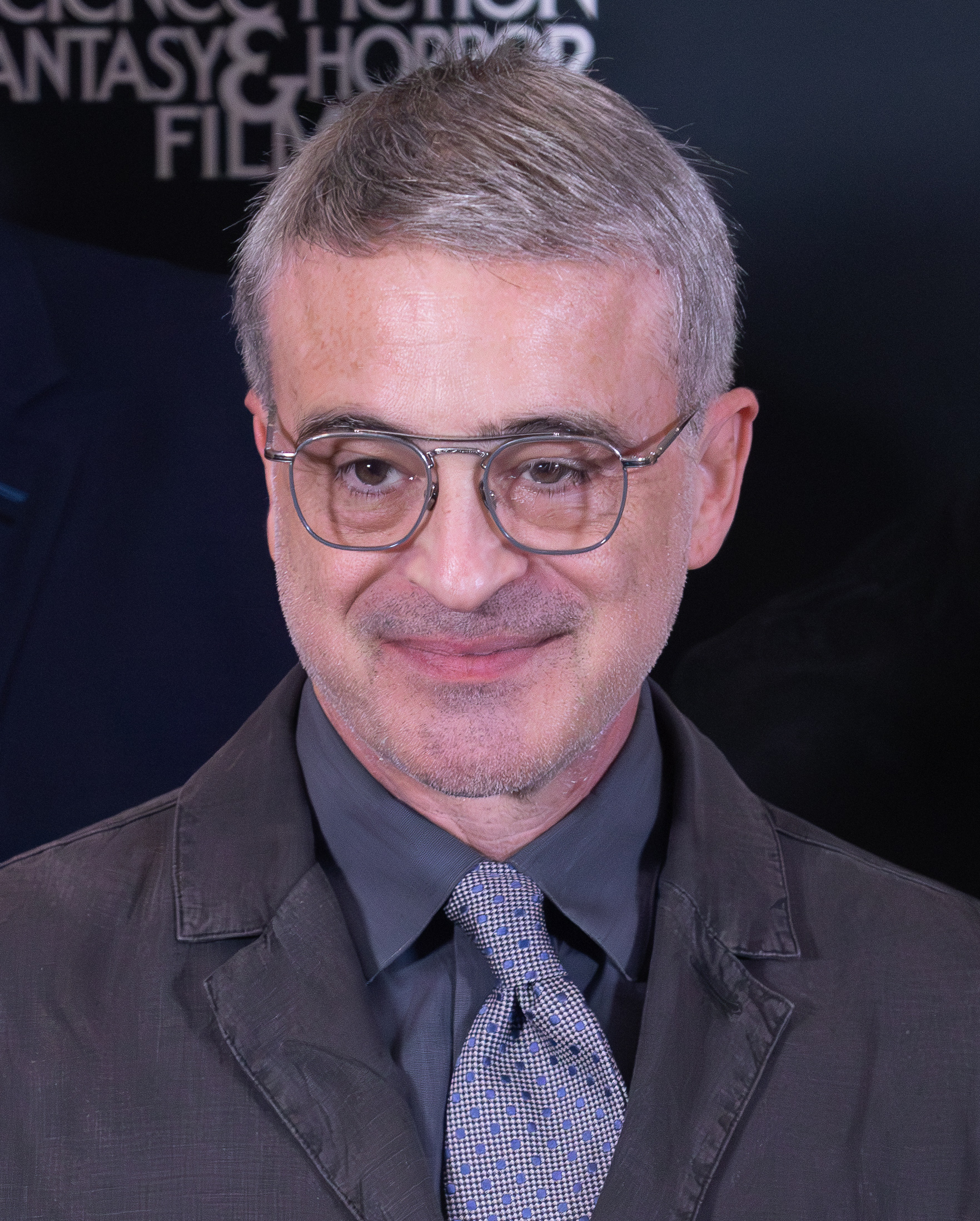
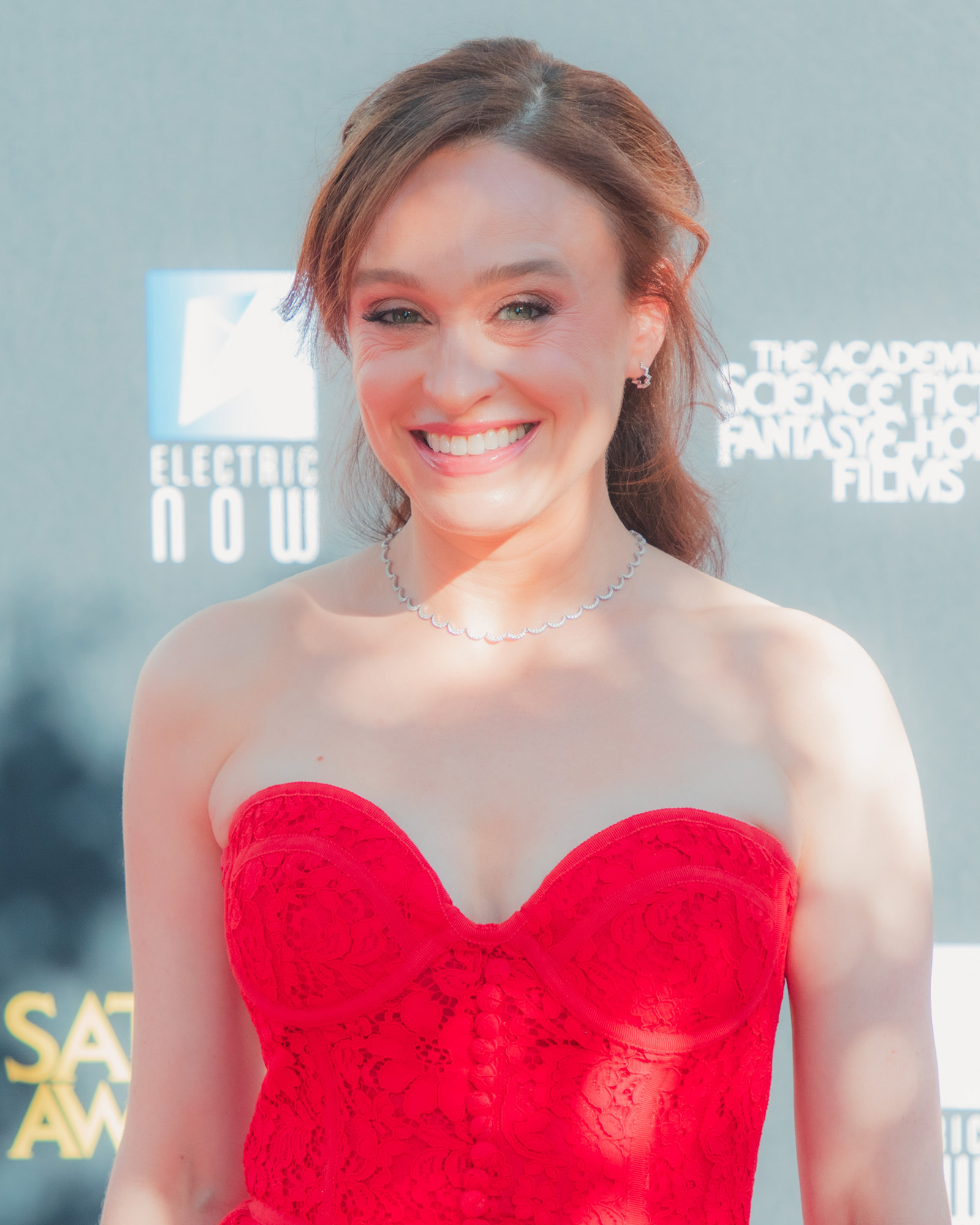
Starfleet Academy showrunners Alex Kurtzman (left) and Noga Landau (right)

In June 2018, after becoming sole showrunner of the series Star Trek: Discovery (2017–2024), Alex Kurtzman signed a five-year overall deal with CBS Television Studios to expand the Star Trek franchise beyond Discovery to several new series, miniseries, and animated series. One series that was being planned as part of this deal was a "younger-skewing" project set at Starfleet Academy. It was being developed by Stephanie Savage and Josh Schwartz, who were known for creating other young adult-focused television series. The project was still in development in January 2020, but production was not expected to begin until 2021 at the earliest.

In February 2021, Kurtzman said a new series was unlikely to be added to streaming service Paramount+'s Star Trek Universe slate until one of the existing five series came to an end. Development on the Starfleet Academy series was re-confirmed that August, and a month later Kurtzman gave it as an example of a future Star Trek series that he was excited to make and that he had seen "a lot of conversations" about. In February 2022, Kurtzman said his team was planning Star Trek projects that would be released two or three years later, including a series based on Section 31 and another that he did not give details on. Soon after, a new version of Star Trek: Starfleet Academy was reported to be in development with writer Gaia Violo. It was expected to be pitched to Paramount+ shortly, with production planned to begin within a year as the next Star Trek series after Section 31. In May, Kurtzman confirmed that Section 31 and Starfleet Academy were the two projects in development that he and his team were focusing on.

Kevin and Dan Hageman, showrunners of the animated series Star Trek: Prodigy (2021–2024), revealed in December 2022 that they wanted the young protagonists of their series to join Starfleet Academy, but this was changed in part to avoid covering the same ground as the planned Starfleet Academy series. In March 2023, after revealing that Discovery would be ending with its fifth season, Kurtzman expressed interest in making more limited event series and television films for the franchise rather than just traditional ongoing television series; Star Trek: Section 31 was re-developed into a streaming "event film" that was released in January 2025. At the end of March 2023, Paramount+ announced that Starfleet Academy had been ordered to series. Kurtzman and Noga Landau were set as showrunners and executive producers alongside Violo, Aaron Baiers, Jenny Lumet, Rod Roddenberry, Trevor Roth, Frank Siracusa, and John Weber. A year later, Kurtzman confirmed that there would be 10 episodes as with previous Star Trek series. Olatunde Osunsanmi returned from Discovery as producing director and was added as another executive producer by August 2024. In October, Kurtzman announced that a second season had been ordered. That season completed filming on February 24, 2026, though with the acquisition of Paramount by Skydance Media, this raised a question as to the future of Trek beyond 2027, when Star Trek: Strange New Worlds would air its fifth and final season. As this was the first time in nine years that no new Trek was in production, that future would be decided by the newly merged company, Paramount Skydance.

=== Writing ===
The writers' room was based at Kurtzman's Secret Hideout offices in Santa Monica. By the time of the series' official announcement, Violo had written the first episode, and Tawny Newsome had been hired as a writer. Newsome, the voice of Beckett Mariner on the animated series Star Trek: Lower Decks (2020–2024), was the first Star Trek actor to be hired for a staff writing position on a Star Trek series. Kurtzman approached Newsome about joining the series after being impressed with her improvisation skills during the filming of the Star Trek: Strange New Worlds crossover episode "Those Old Scientists" (2023). Other writers included Jane Maggs, Alex Taub, Kiley Rossetter, Eric Anthony Glover, Kirsten Beyer, and Kenneth Lin. The writers were expected to finish work by the end of 2023, but this was delayed by the 2023 Writers Guild of America strike. They returned to work in mid-October after the strike ended in late September, and were halfway through the first season by March 2024. The writers were working on the second season by January 2025.

The series is set in the 32nd century, the far-future era of the Star Trek franchise that was introduced in Discovery. It follows the first new class of Starfleet cadets in over a century as they come of age and train to be officers. Kurtzman felt the characters, who are a new generation of cadets that are inheriting "massive, massive challenges", were relatable to the "generation now" who would be watching. He said the cadets' mission is to "reinstate the original vision of Star Trek"; the series champions the Star Trek ideals of empathy, unity, and peacemaking over intolerance and hate. In addition to serving as a metaphor for real world challenges, the 32nd century setting gave the writers some freedom from the existing Star Trek canon and helped them introduce new young fans to the franchise without needing to have seen past projects. Despite this, Newsome said there were writers on staff who were "real canon hound dogs" and wanted to ensure the series remained true to the franchise for long-time fans. Characters from previous Star Trek projects are referenced as famous Starfleet officers.

Kurtzman said the series would follow some cadets through graduation and beyond while also introducing new students in later seasons. He said it had "kind of a hybrid format". Previous attempts to develop Starfleet Academy struggled with not being able to use traditional Star Trek ideas of adventure and space exploration in a classroom-based series. Their solution was to set the series on the USS Athena, a starship that docks at the Starfleet Academy campus in San Francisco but can also be deployed with the rest of the fleet. Kurtzman compared this to teaching hospitals, with the cadets able to learn in the field with real Starfleet officers, allowing for episodes where the cadets meet new species, learn about diplomacy, and find their place within Starfleet. Landau said each episode also explores a different coming of age aspect, combining pranks and romance with alien encounters and conflicts. She wanted the audience's takeaway from each episode to be a feeling of wanting to attend Starfleet Academy. Kurtzman said the writers had a rule that the instructors needed to be as interesting and fun as the cadets, similar to the teachers at Hogwarts in the Harry Potter franchise. He encouraged the writers to ground the series in science and have the main characters use science to solve their problems.

=== Casting ===
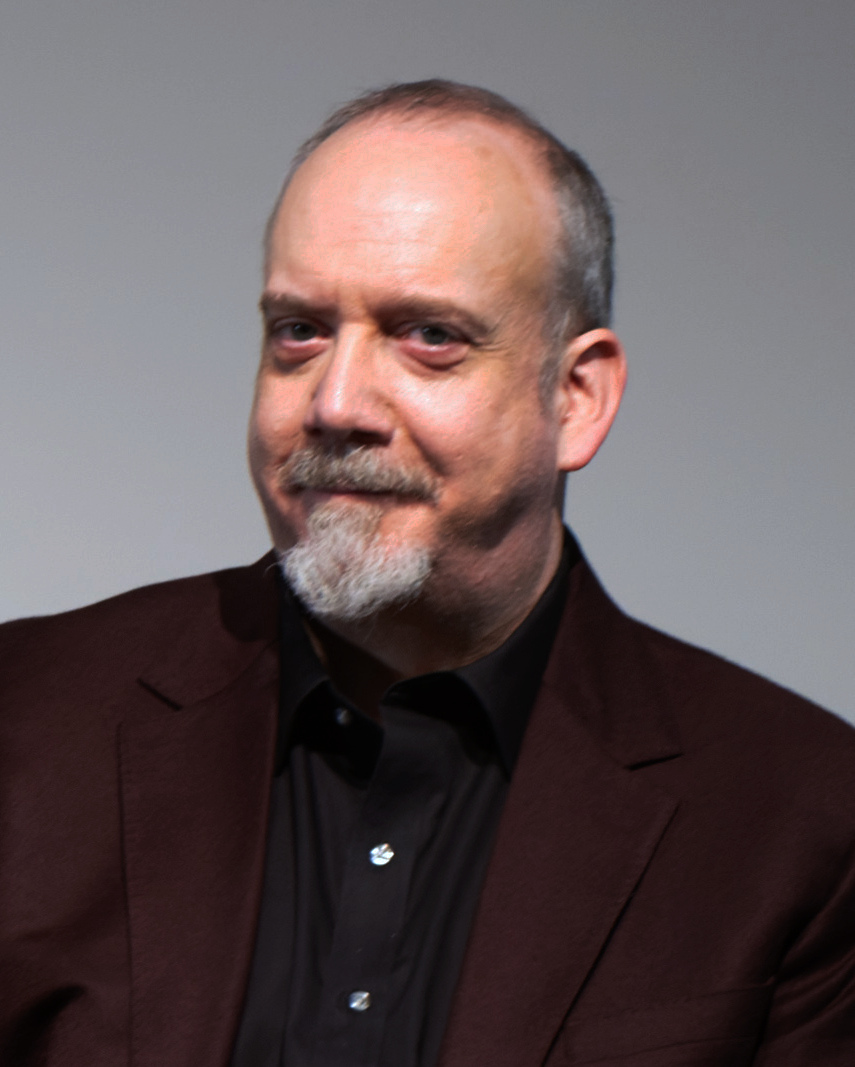
Paul Giamatti has a recurring role as the first season's main villain, after expressing interest in joining the franchise while promoting his film The Holdovers.

In the fourth season of Discovery (2021–2022), Mary Wiseman's Sylvia Tilly becomes a teacher at Starfleet Academy. This storyline led to speculation about whether Wiseman would be reprising her role in Starfleet Academy. There was also speculation about other Discovery stars making guest appearances in the series. In March 2024, Doug Jones expressed interest in reprising his Discovery role of Saru as a "guest speaker" at Starfleet Academy. In May, Tig Notaro expressed interest in reprising her Discovery role of Jett Reno in the series, saying she was "hoping that I can continue on somewhere, somehow" in the Star Trek franchise after Discovery's conclusion. Notaro first joined Discovery due to being long-time friends with Kurtzman.

In March 2024, Kurtzman said casting for the cadets was yet to begin but some of the adult roles had been filled. Holly Hunter was revealed in May to be cast in the lead role of the chancellor of Starfleet Academy. The character was written with Hunter in mind, but the writers did not expect her to be interested and were surprised when she "signed on right away". Kerrice Brooks, Bella Shepard, George Hawkins, Karim Diané, and Zoë Steiner were set to star as cadets in July, when Notaro and Oded Fehr were announced to be reprising their respective roles of Jett Reno and Admiral Charles Vance from Discovery. Robert Picardo was also announced to be starring in the series, reprising his role as the Doctor from Star Trek: Voyager (1995–2001) and other Star Trek media. Sandro Rosta was cast as another cadet a month later, while attending drama school. Roles for the main cast were revealed in July 2025: Hunter as Captain Nahla Ake; Rosta as Caleb Mir, Diané as Jay-Den Kraag, Brooks as Sam (Series Acclimation Mil), Hawkins as Darem Reymi, and Shepard as Genesis Lythe, all cadets; and Steiner as Tarima Sadal.

Paul Giamatti was cast in the recurring guest role of the season's main villain in June 2024, later revealed to be named Nus Braka. Kurtzman contacted Giamatti about joining the series after the actor expressed his love for Star Trek and wish to portray a Klingon while promoting his film The Holdovers (2023). Giamatti was given the first five scripts and his choice of five different guest roles, and chose the villain. Kurtzman was surprised by the choice, assuming that Giamatti would only want a one-episode role due to his busy schedule. In July, Gina Yashere was cast in the recurring role of an instructor, revealed to be cadet master Lura Thok, and Wiseman was confirmed to be returning as Tilly for a guest role. Tatiana Maslany was revealed in October to have a recurring guest role in the season, and Becky Lynch said in December that she had been cast as a member of a Starfleet bridge crew. In October 2025, Stephen Colbert was revealed to be the voice of Starfleet Academy's Digital Dean of Students. The next month, Brit Marling was revealed to be the voice of the Athena's computer.

In October 2026, Bill Nighy and Rosemarie DeWitt were revealed to be guest-starring in the second season.

=== Design ===
Matthew Davies was working as production designer for the series by March 2024. The set for the atrium of Starfleet Academy is the largest ever built for a Star Trek series and fills the biggest soundstage in Canada, which is 45,900 square feet (4,260 m^{2}). The atrium set is two stories and features a mess hall, amphitheater, multiple classrooms, catwalks, trees, and a view of San Francisco's Golden Gate Bridge. Gersha Phillips returned from Discovery as a costume designer and was joined by Avery Plewes. Phillips said Kurtzman directed them to make the Starfleet uniforms feel "hip and cool and appeal[ing] to the young audience".

=== Filming ===
Filming was expected to begin in early 2024, before production was delayed by the 2023 Writers Guild of America strike. In March 2024, Kurtzman said filming would begin later that year, at Pinewood Toronto Studios in Toronto, Canada, where Discovery and Section 31 were filmed. Filming began on August 26, 2024, with Kurtzman directing the first two episodes. Philip Lanyon returned from Discovery as a cinematographer. Location filming took place that week in the Uptown area of Waterloo, Ontario, under the working title Ivory Tower. Kurtzman was still filming his episodes in late October. Osunsanmi also directed for the first season, as did frequent Star Trek director Jonathan Frakes, who directed the penultimate episode. Frakes previously said he was unable to direct an episode of the season because the schedule clashed with his son's wedding. In late January 2025, Kurtzman said there was two weeks of production left for the first season and he expected filming for the second season to begin in the middle of that year. Filming for the first season officially wrapped in the week of February 10. Pre-production on the second season began that June, with filming beginning on August 27 at Pinewood. On February 24, 2026, the production completed filming of season 2, with ten episodes filmed; actor Diané celebrated the twenty episodes produced for the series.

=== Music ===
Jeff Russo was hired to compose the score for the series by December 2024, returning from Discovery, Section 31, and other Star Trek series. Additional music is by Dan the Automator.

== Marketing ==
Kurtzman and Landau promoted the series during a "Star Trek Universe" panel at San Diego Comic-Con (SDCC) in July 2024, where cast members returning from previous Star Trek series were announced. They released a video during the panel which shows the young cadet actors learning that they had been cast in the series. Picardo made a surprise appearance at a different "Star Trek Universe" panel that October, at New York Comic Con (NYCC), and introduced a livestream from the set featuring Kurtzman, Rosta, Brooks, Shepard, Hawkins, Diané, and Steiner. They announced the second-season order and Maslany's casting.

Picardo moderated another SDCC "Star Trek Universe" panel in July 2025, where Kurtzman, Landau, Hunter, Rosta, Diané, Brooks, Hawkins, and Shepard revealed character and story details. The first trailer was shown, before being released online. Borys Kit at The Hollywood Reporter said the producers would have to "work on building enthusiasm" for the series based on reactions to the trailer from fans at the panel, while his colleague James Hibberd said online responses to the trailer were divided. Another trailer was shown at an NYCC "Star Trek Universe" panel in October, where the series was promoted by Kurtzman, Landau, Hunter, Rosta, Diané, Brooks, Hawkins, Shepard, Steiner, and Giamatti. Hibberd and Gizmodo's James Whitbrook both found that the second trailer put more emphasis on drama and intensity over the classroom and youth-focused elements seen in the first trailer. The website StarfleetAcademy.com was also launched at that time, allowing fans to sign up for updates and explore information about Starfleet Academy's campus, academics, and faculty.

== Release ==
Star Trek: Starfleet Academy premiered on the streaming service Paramount+ on January 15, 2026, with its first two episodes. The other eight episodes of the first season were released weekly through March 12. On March 23, 2026, CBS and Paramount announced that the ten-episode second season in post-production would be the series' last. The ten-episode second season is expected to premiere in March 2027.

== Reception ==
On the review aggregator website Rotten Tomatoes, 85% of 62 critics' reviews are positive. The website's consensus for season 1 reads: "Injecting a heavy dose of hormones and humor into the Star Trek universe, Starfleet Academy marks a refreshing tonal shift that proves this franchise still has plenty of new thematic territory to explore." Metacritic, which uses a weighted average, assigned the series a score of 66 out of 100, based on 24 critics, indicating "generally favorable" reviews.

In January 2026, audience scores for the series on Rotten Tomatoes and IMDb were review bombed after the release of the first two episodes. Jake Hodges of Collider noted an audience rating of 43% on Rotten Tomatoes on January 26, 2026, under half of the critic rating of 88% at the time. Forbes staff writer Conor Murray noted a user rating of 4.9 out of a possible 10 on IMDb on January 16, 2026, detailing anti-"woke" criticisms from Stephen Miller, End Wokeness and The Babylon Bee, and comparing the review bombing to that of Star Wars: The Acolyte in 2024.

Following the announcement of the end of the series, William Shatner wrote on X: "I for one would love to see its continuity. It's with sorrow that I hear about the cancellation of the new Star Trek series."

On April 7, 2026, the Critics Choice Association announced the series was to receive the Ensemble Award at the 3rd Celebration of LGBTQ+ Cinema & Television, scheduled for May 29, 2026, honoring cast members Tig Notaro, Karim Diané, Gina Yashere, and Kerrice Brooks.

== Tie-in media ==
A five-issue tie-in comic series titled Star Trek: Starfleet Academy – Lost Contact was announced by IDW Publishing in January 2026, with publication beginning in April 2026. The series follows the cadets from the television series and is written by Layne Morgan, with artwork by Coralí Espuña and Nora Serrano.

In April 2026, IDW Publishing announced that its 2026 Star Trek Celebrations comic anthology includes a Starfleet Academy story titled Klingons Don't Flirt, written by cast member Karim Diané, with art by Andrew Drilon and Katherine Shuda and lettering from Jodie Troutman, scheduled for publication in May 2026.
