= My Old Ass =

2024 film by Megan Park

- Theatrical release poster
- Directed by: Megan Park
- Written by: Megan Park
- Produced by: Tom Ackerley; Margot Robbie; Josey McNamara; Steven Rales
- Starring: Maisy Stella; Percy Hynes White; Maddie Ziegler; Kerrice Brooks; Aubrey Plaza
- Cinematography: Kristen Correll
- Edited by: Jennifer Vecchiarello
- Music by: Tyler Hilton; Jaco Caraco
- Production companies: Indian Paintbrush; LuckyChap Entertainment
- Distributed by: Amazon MGM Studios (United States); Warner Bros. Pictures (Australia, Canada and New Zealand)
- Release dates: January 20, 2024 (Sundance); September 13, 2024 (United States)
- Running time: 89 minutes
- Countries: United States; Canada
- Language: English
- Box office: $5.7 million

My Old Ass is a 2024 coming-of-age comedy drama film, written and directed by Megan Park. It stars Maisy Stella in her film debut, Percy Hynes White, Maddie Ziegler, Kerrice Brooks, and Aubrey Plaza. The plot follows Elliott, an 18-year-old girl who encounters her 39-year-old self (portrayed by Stella and Plaza, respectively) during a mushroom trip.

My Old Ass premiered at the Sundance Film Festival on January 20, 2024. It was given a limited theatrical release in the United States by Amazon MGM Studios on September 13, 2024 and was released internationally by Warner Bros. Pictures. It received positive reviews and was named one of the top 10 independent films of 2024 by the National Board of Review. Among its accolades, the film earned two nominations at the 30th Critics' Choice Awards—where Stella won Best Young Performer—and 40th Independent Spirit Awards, while Park was recognised by the DGA and WGA, and Stella received a number of breakthrough performance awards (including a Gotham Award nomination). The film has also garnered recognition among fellow filmmakers, with Chris Columbus naming it one of his favorite films of 2024.

== Plot ==
Elliott, a teenage girl living on her parents' cranberry farm in Muskoka Lakes, Ontario, has three weeks left before she leaves for university in Toronto. She spends her summer days boating with her friends Ro and Ruthie, working on the farm, and engaging in a romance with Chelsea, a girl she has had a crush on since grade eight.

On a night out camping to celebrate her eighteenth birthday, Elliott takes mushroom tea with Ro and Ruthie; all three experience psychedelic trips. Elliott sees a woman appear next to her who says she is her older self. Though Elliott is skeptical at first, the woman proves she is the future version of herself by showing a scar on her ribcage and sharing knowledge of Elliott's asymmetrical breasts. Older Elliott, a PhD student, gives her younger self advice by suggesting that the younger Elliott treasure her time at the farm and bond with her family. She also mysteriously tells her to avoid a boy named Chad. The pair fall asleep in the tent, and Older Elliott puts her number in younger Elliott's phone under the name "My Old Ass".

The following day at her home, Elliott remains in contact with Older Elliott by phone. She decides to spend more time with her younger siblings Max and Spencer. One day while skinny-dipping in the lake, she encounters a boy who is spending his summer working for her father. When he reveals his name is Chad, Elliott remembers Older Elliott's warning and resolves to keep her distance from him. However, as Chad shows himself to be likeable and thoughtful, she finds herself becoming attracted to him, which confuses her as she thought she was a lesbian.

Elliott learns from her brother that her parents are selling the farm after she leaves. When she confronts her father about it, he tells her how she was always looking forward to leaving anyway, but she expresses that she thought the farm would always be there to come back to. Nevertheless, he tells her the family got a good offer they cannot turn down and Elliott must accept it.

One day, Elliott asks Chad to accompany her to help sell her boat. On the boat, they confide in each other about how fast life can go and Elliott says she wishes she could stop time. They share a kiss, causing Elliott to freak out and flee. In an attempt to make Older Elliott appear again, Elliott goes to Maud Island with Ro and gets high on the mushrooms. During her trip, she does not see Older Elliott but hallucinates that she is Justin Bieber, performing "One Less Lonely Girl" and giving Chad red roses. The next day Elliott talks to Ro about acknowledging her bisexuality.

Elliott takes Ro and Ruthie to meet Chad, who reveals he found a buyer for the boat. He and Elliott take the boat out for one last ride, but the motor falls off mid-ride as it starts raining. The pair get to a lookout shack, where Elliott discovers Chad already attends her university. She tells him she used to think she was gay, and that "a friend" told her it would be a bad idea to get close to him, but that so far she likes him and is going to go with her gut and ignore what her friend said. They admit their mutual feelings for each other and have sex.

After Chad walks her home, Older Elliott reappears to Elliott. Older Elliott reveals why she warned her against Chad—Chad will die and she cannot save him. Because of this, she does not want younger Elliott to experience the same pain. However, Elliott says she will go ahead and fall in love with Chad anyway because the experience is worth it. Chad returns to bring Elliott her shirt and can surprisingly see Older Elliott. The two awkwardly introduce Older Elliott as Elliott's "uncle" Michelle, and Older Elliott gives Chad a tearful hug. She says goodbye and leaves forever, now encouraging Younger Elliott to experience this tragic love. Elliott receives a voicemail from Older Elliott telling her not to live for the past or future, but for herself in the present.

== Cast ==
- Maisy Stella as Elliott LaBrant
  - Aubrey Plaza as older Elliott LaBrant
- Percy Hynes White as Chad
- Maddie Ziegler as Ruthie
- Kerrice Brooks as Ro
- Maria Dizzia as Kathy, Elliott's mother
- Alexandria Rivera as Chelsea
- Al Goulem as Tom, Elliott's father
- Seth Isaac Johnson as Max LaBrant
- Carter Trozzolo as Spencer LaBrant

== Production ==
In March 2022, it was announced that Megan Park would write and direct her sophomore feature film, a coming-of-age comedy titled My Old Ass, with LuckyChap Entertainment and Indian Paintbrush producing. Margot Robbie did pre-production meetings and was on set during production.

Principal photography began on August 15, 2022, in Muskoka Lakes, Ontario, Canada. Park stated that the setting was somewhere she visited every summer growing up and the film overall was "a love letter to Canada". It wrapped in October 2022. Tyler Hilton revealed in a January 2023 interview that he was scoring the film and Aubrey Plaza was starring. Plaza was on set for one week after wrapping The White Lotus and was still in deal negotiations while the film was in production.

== Release ==
My Old Ass premiered at the Sundance Film Festival on January 20, 2024. Amazon MGM Studios acquired distribution rights to the film for over $15 million, with plans for a theatrical release before making the film available on Prime Video for streaming worldwide.

The film received a limited theatrical release in the United States, originally scheduled for August 2, 2024, but delayed to September 13, 2024. It was released in the United Kingdom by Curzon Film on September 27, 2024.

== Reception ==
=== Box office ===
My Old Ass grossed $5.4 million domestically (United States and Canada), and $0.3 million in other territories, for a worldwide total of $5.7 million. Despite its very limited opening, appearing in fewer than 40 theatres during its first two weeks, it did finish at No. 10 at the domestic box office in its third week, having expanded briefly to a wide release of 1,390 screens, for its only week in the Top 10.

=== Critical response ===
On the review aggregator website Rotten Tomatoes, 90% of 203 critics' reviews are positive, with an average rating of 7.6/10. The website's consensus reads: "A humorous sci-fi cocktail with a twist of drama, My Old Ass doesn't throw out the wisdom with the reckless abandon of youth and the effects are hallucinogenic." Metacritic, which uses a weighted average, assigned the film a score of 75 out of 100, based on 44 critics, indicating "generally favorable" reviews.

Christy Lemire of RogerEbert.com awarded the film 3½ out of 4 stars, praising the performances, direction, and cinematography. She wrote Stella "has incredible screen presence and a great sense of comic timing, but she's equally convincing playing the more dramatic moments required of her character. It's an exciting feature film debut." Of Plaza, Lemire said she "looks nothing like Stella, which is part of the joke, but the two actresses match each other with their sardonic wit. Plaza's deadpan meets Stella's effervescence, and somewhere in that giddy mix, you quickly believe these two are one."

Lemire added, "Besides crafting characters who feel like real people, Park also creates a vivid sense of place. Much of My Old Ass is set on the scenic lakes near the family farm. Shimmering, golden afternoons on the water give way to thunderstorms thick with portent. (Cinematographer Kristen Correll creates a romantic, wistful mood throughout.) The adventures and the enveloping quiet feel personal and specific, but there's a universality to this crucial point in Elliott's life that gives the film unexpected poignancy."

Alison Willmore of Vulture wrote, "My Old Ass has the premise of a broad comedy and the soul of a bittersweet coming-of-age story. And one of the reasons that it works so disarmingly well is that it doesn't treat the former as a means of sneaking in the latter." She praised how the film "takes a grown-up's fantasy of getting the chance to retroactively apply the wisdom of your years to undo the mistakes of the past, and then turns it around to be a celebration of being young and heedless, with no clue what you're doing."

Richard Lawson of Vanity Fair also praised Stella, saying she "makes Elliott a just-shy-of-annoying good-times gal, rude and rowdy but ultimately kind and decent. It's a charming, high-energy performance that is finely attuned to the emotional undulations of the film." Lawson noted the choice of setting—"the shores and islands of Lake Muskoka in Ontario, [make] My Old Ass a proudly, distinctly Canadian film. It's as alluring as a pleasant dream, sun dappled and teeming with possibility." He concluded, "What Park creates from the tension between this joyful, exciting present and a seemingly ominous future is rather marvelous, a big and sincere sentiment about the risk and reward of life, a message that is just as worthy for a middle-ager as it is for a kid."

Filmmaker Chris Columbus named it one of his favorite films of 2024, saying "Over the past decade, I've witnessed a handful of young filmmakers with this kind of extraordinary promise. Megan, along with directors like Ryan Coogler and Robert Eggers, is a crucial component of our cinematic future. Yet she expertly acknowledges the inspiration of our celluloid past, proudly walking in the footsteps of Billy Wilder, Elaine May and John Hughes." Other filmmakers, including Kelly Fremon Craig, William Goldenberg, Drew Hancock and Don Hertzfeldt also praised the film.

=== Accolades ===
Award	Date of ceremony	Category	Recipient(s)	Result	Ref.
Variety Breakthrough Awards	January 19, 2024	Breakthrough Artist	Maddie Ziegler	Won	
Gotham Awards	December 2, 2024	Breakthrough Performer	Maisy Stella	Nominated	
National Board of Review	December 4, 2024	Top Ten Independent Films	My Old Ass	Won	
Michigan Movie Critics Guild	December 6, 2024	Breakthrough Award	Maisy Stella	Nominated	
San Diego Film Critics Society Awards	December 9, 2024	Best Comedic Performance	Aubrey Plaza	Nominated	
Las Vegas Film Critics Society	December 13, 2024	Best Youth Performance – Female (under 21)	Maisy Stella	Won	
Las Vegas Film Critics Society	December 13, 2024	Best Comedy	My Old Ass	Won	
Indiana Film Journalists Association	December 16, 2024	Breakout of the Year	Maisy Stella	Nominated	
Columbus Film Critics Association	January 2, 2025	Best Comedy	My Old Ass	Nominated	
Kansas City Film Critics Circle	January 4, 2025	Best LGBT Film	My Old Ass	Nominated	
Alliance of Women Film Journalists	January 7, 2025	Best Woman Director	Megan Park	Nominated	
Alliance of Women Film Journalists	January 7, 2025	Best Woman Screenwriter	Megan Park	Nominated	
Alliance of Women Film Journalists	January 7, 2025	Best Breakthrough Performance	Maisy Stella	Nominated	
Music City Film Critics Association	January 10, 2025	Best Young Actress	Maisy Stella	Nominated	
Music City Film Critics Association	January 10, 2025	Best Comedy Film	My Old Ass	Nominated	
Critics' Choice Movie Awards	January 12, 2025	Best Comedy Film	My Old Ass	Nominated	
Critics' Choice Movie Awards	January 12, 2025	Best Young Actor or Actress	Maisy Stella	Won	
London Film Critics' Circle	February 2, 2025	Breakthrough Performer	Maisy Stella	Nominated	
Saturn Awards	February 2, 2025	Best Fantasy Film	My Old Ass	Nominated	
Directors Guild of America Awards	February 8, 2025	Outstanding Directing – First-Time Feature Film	Megan Park	Nominated	
Artios Awards	February 12, 2025	Outstanding Achievement in Casting – Feature Studio or Independent (Comedy)	Douglas Aibel & Matthew Glasner	Won	
Writers Guild of America Awards	February 15, 2025	Best Original Screenplay	Megan Park	Nominated	
Independent Spirit Awards	February 22, 2025	Best Screenplay	Megan Park	Nominated	
Independent Spirit Awards	February 22, 2025	Best Breakthrough Performance	Maisy Stella	Won	
GLAAD Media Awards	March 29, 2025	Outstanding Film – Wide Release	My Old Ass	Won	
