= Sandro Rosta =

British-Canadian actor

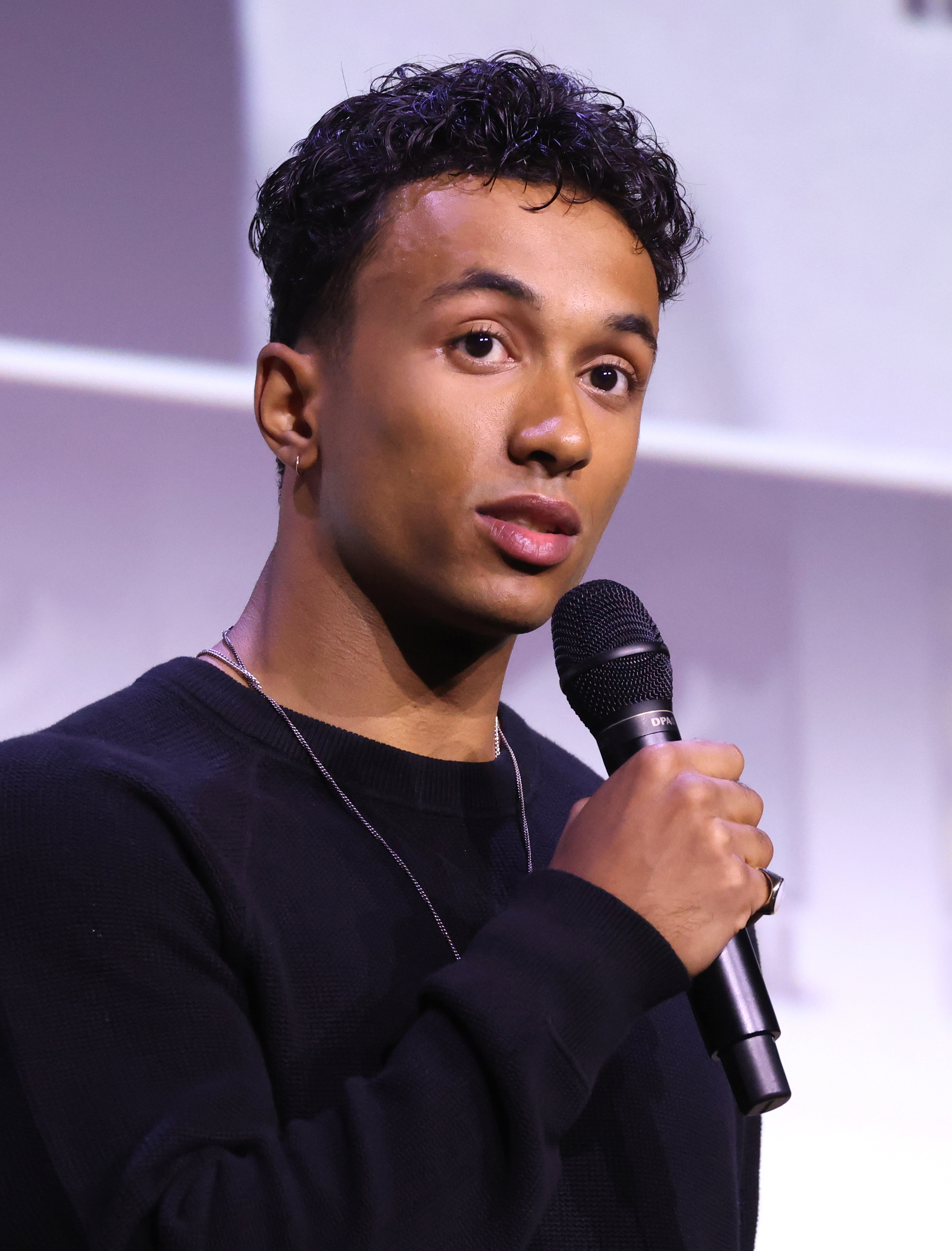
Rosta in 2025

Sandro Rosta is a 26–27-year-old British‑Canadian film actor who became known for his role as Cadet Caleb Mir in the U.S. television series Star Trek: Starfleet Academy.

== Education ==
Rosta completed a three‑year acting program at the Oxford School of Drama, graduating in 2024, having previously attended the school's one‑year Foundation Course in 2020/21.

== Career ==
Rosta initially appeared mainly on stage shortly after completing his training. He made his professional debut at the Hampstead Theatre in the production The Harmony Test. During his training, he had also performed in plays such as Romeo and Juliet, The Cherry Orchard, and The Watsons.

=== Television and film ===
Rosta landed his first major screen role in the television series Star Trek: Starfleet Academy, which premiered on the streaming service Paramount+ in January 2026. In the series, he portrayed the human cadet Caleb Mir, a member of the newly re‑established Starfleet Academy. Rosta was cast after being selected from over 400 candidates following a chemistry read with the co-star Holly Hunter, whose immediate connection with him convinced the showrunners of his authenticity.

Previously, Rosta had taken part in the CA$5,000‑budgeted student project Snitches Get Stitches (2021), directed by Aaron Rubinoff, a thesis film created by students at the RTA School of Media at Ryerson University.
