= Significant Others (2022 TV series) =

Australian television miniseries

- Created by: Tommy Murphy
- Written by: Tommy Murphy; Niki Aken; Blake Ayshford; Louise Fox; Vonne Patiag; Sue Smith
- Directed by: Tony Krawitz
- Starring: Rachael Blake; Alison Bell; Zoë Steiner
- Composer: Matteo Zingales
- Country of origin: Australia
- Original language: English
- No. of seasons: 1
- No. of episodes: 6

Production
- Producer: Matt Reeder
- Cinematography: Hugh Miller
- Running time: 60 minutes

Original release
- Network: ABC
- Release: 16 October – 20 November 2022

Significant Others is an Australian drama television miniseries created by Tommy Murphy and directed by Tony Krawitz.

== Synopsis ==
Single mother of two, Sarah (Jacqueline McKenzie) mysteriously disappears after failing to return from her morning swim. Her estranged siblings Den (Kenneth Moraleda), Ursula (Rachael Blake) and Claire (Alison Bell) and their respective partners converge on the family home, to rally around Sarah's teenage kids, Hanna (Zoë Steiner) and Ciaran (Gulliver McGrath), only to find the place in disarray.

When Constable Deborah Munroe (Rarriwuy Hick) fails to find answers or retrieve a body from the ocean, uncertainty wreaks havoc on the family. As hope fades that Sarah will return, the family must find a peaceful new existence.

== Cast ==
- Rachael Blake as Ursula
- Alison Bell as Claire
- Zoë Steiner as Hanna
- Gulliver McGrath as Ciaran
- Todd McKenney as Wayne
- Kenneth Moraleda as Den
- Anastasia Bampos as Becky
- Jacqueline McKenzie as Sarah
- Diana Popovska as George
- Aston Droomer as Jake
- Rarriwuy Hick as Deborah Munroe
- Alan Dukes as Scott
- Fayssal Bazzi as Ali

== Reception ==
The Sydney Morning Herald''s Debi Enker wrote "There’s an immediately absorbing intensity to the six-part local drama, Significant Others." Luke Buckmaster of The Guardian gave it 4 stars, concluding "The show's final revelations and moments of catharsis are a little neat, wrapping things up decisively, but this is a class act from beginning to end."

== Awards ==
- Logie Awards of 2023: Nominated, Most Outstanding Drama Series, Miniseries or Telemovie
- Equity Ensemble Awards: Winner, Most Outstanding Performance by an Ensemble in a Mini-Series/Telemovie
