= Karim Diané =

American actor and singer

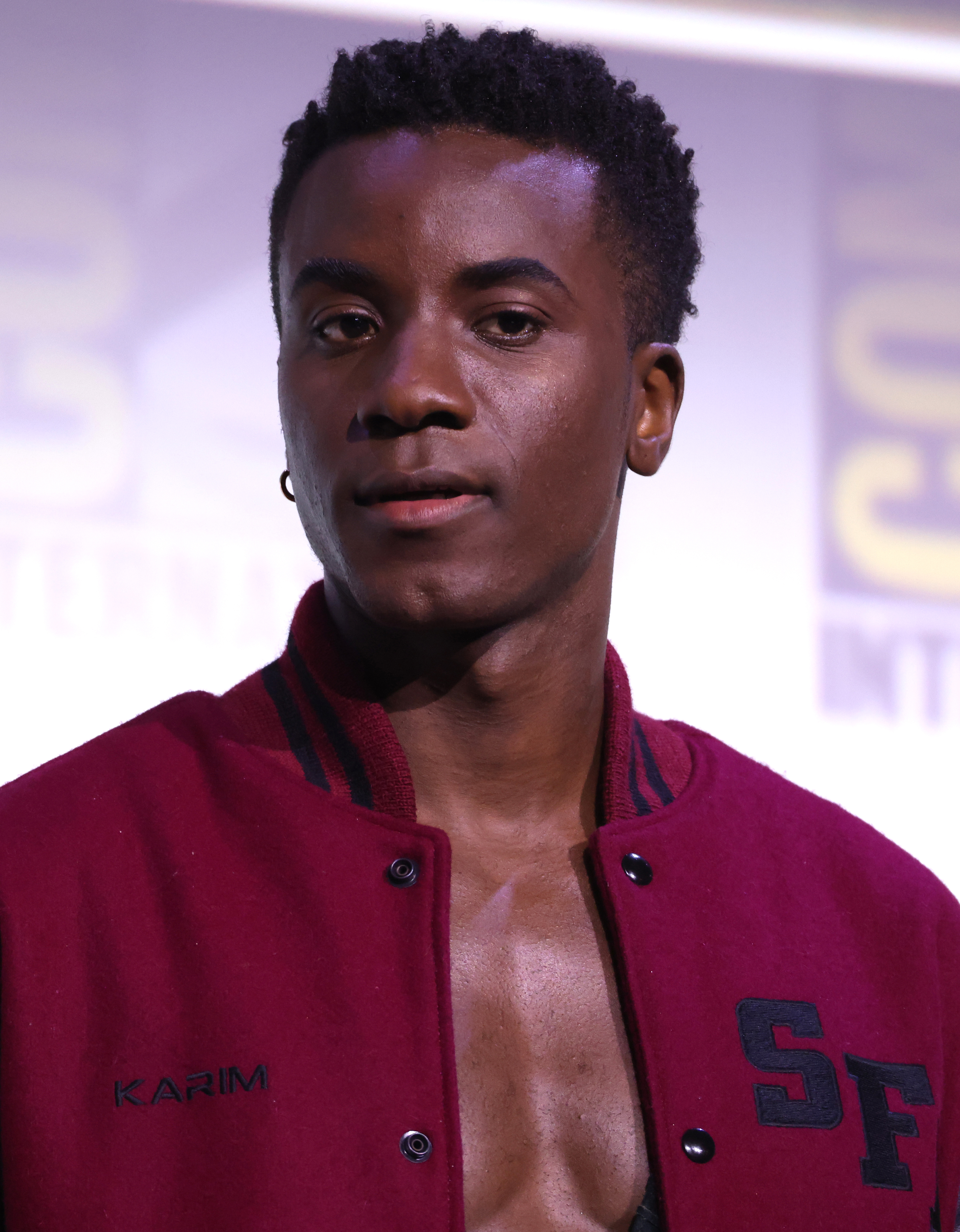
- Diané in 2025
- Born: 26 April 2002 (age 24); Washington, D.C., U.S.
- Occupation: Actor • singer

Karim Diané (born 26 April 2002) is an American actor and singer. He gained international recognition for portraying Jay-Den Kraag, the first openly gay Klingon character of the Star Trek franchise, in the Paramount+ series Star Trek: Starfleet Academy. His portrayal and the character's significance have received substantial attention in independent secondary sources.

== Life and career ==
Diané was born in Washington, D.C., to parents with Congolese and Guinean roots. He began his career in music before transitioning into acting. He first gained wider attention after appearing on The X Factor USA, where he advanced to the later stages of the competition.

=== Star Trek: Starfleet Academy ===
In 2024, Variety reported that Diané joined the cast of Star Trek: Starfleet Academy, starring alongside Holly Hunter and Paul Giamatti.

He portrays Jay-Den Kraag, the Star Trek franchise's first depiction of an openly gay Klingon character. His role received significant attention in independent media. Den of Geek published an in‑depth interview discussing his interpretation of the character and the creative decisions behind the portrayal. Metro Weekly featured a multi‑page profile examining the cultural significance of the character. Additional coverage in LGBTQ Nation, Parade, Entertainment Weekly, Bleeding Cool, and Queerty highlighted both the character's groundbreaking nature and Diané's preparation for the role.

Diané stated that he consulted veteran Star Trek actor Michael Dorn who played Worf in Star Trek: The Next Generation, to prepare for his role.

In April 2026, Diané was announced as one of the writers contributing a story to IDW Publishing's Star Trek Celebrations comic anthology.

== Awards and honors ==
On April 7, 2026, the Critics Choice Association announced Karim Diané as an honoree at its 3rd Celebration of LGBTQ+ Cinema & Television, scheduled for May 29, 2026, for his role in Star Trek: Starfleet Academy. Along with Tig Notaro, Gina Yashere, and Kerrice Brooks, he will receive the Ensemble Award for the series, noted for its queer romantic storylines, including Diané's portrayal of Jay-Den Kraag, the franchise's first gay Klingon, garnering significant acclaim within the LGBTQ+ community.

== Filmography ==
Year	Title	Role		Notes
2013	The X Factor USA		contestant	
2017	StartUp (TV series)	Blue	recurring guest (season 2)	
2021–2022	One of Us Is Lying	Kris	recurring guest (season 1); recurring guest (season 2)	
2023	1266	Posh	series regular	
2026	Star Trek: Starfleet Academy	Jay-Den Kraag	series regular	
