= Zoë Steiner =

Australian actress

- Born: Australia
- Education: University of Melbourne
- Occupation: actress
- Known for: her role as Tarima Sadal in the U.S. television series Star Trek: Starfleet Academy

Zoë Steiner is an Australian actress who became known for her role as Tarima Sadal in the U.S. television series Star Trek: Starfleet Academy.

== Education ==
Born and raised in Melbourne, Steiner attended Genazzano FCJ College and holds a Bachelor of Arts in French and Criminology from University of Melbourne.

== Career ==
Steiner has appeared in multiple short films and studied at 16th Street Actors Studio in Melbourne. She also worked with Lenard Petit at the Michael Chekhov Acting Studio in New York. She has trained with Carl Ford, Lisa Robertson, Iain Sinclair and Les Chantery.

=== Television and film ===
Steiner made her professional debut in the lead role of Hanna in the Australian limited series Significant Others. Her performance was described as "standout" in one review. The show won Outstanding Performance by an Ensemble in A TV Mini-series/Telemovie at the 2023 Equity Ensemble Awards.

In July 2024, she joined the television series Star Trek: Starfleet Academy, which premiered on the streaming service Paramount+ in January 2026. Steiner booked the role after signing a test deal with the studio and performing over Zoom. In January 2026, she was confirmed to be filming season 2.
