= Wolf Pack (TV series) =

2023 American supernatural drama television series

- Genre: Drama; Supernatural
- Created by: Jeff Davis
- Based on: Wolf Pack by Edo van Belkom
- Starring: Armani Jackson; Bella Shepard; Chloe Rose Robertson; Tyler Lawrence Gray; Rodrigo Santoro; Sarah Michelle Gellar
- Country of origin: United States
- Original language: English
- No. of seasons: 1
- No. of episodes: 8

Production
- Executive producers: Jeff Davis; Joseph P. Genier; Karen Gorodetzky; Christian Taylor; Sarah Michelle Gellar; Mike Elliott; Jason Ensler; Sean Crouch
- Production location: Atlanta, Georgia
- Running time: 46–57 minutes
- Production companies: First Cause, Inc.; Capital Arts Entertainment; MTV Entertainment Studios

Original release
- Network: Paramount+
- Release: January 26 – March 16, 2023

Wolf Pack is an American supernatural teen drama television series created by Jeff Davis for Paramount+, based on the 2004 book of the same name written by Edo van Belkom. The series premiered on Paramount+ on January 26 and concluded on March 16, 2023. In January 2024, the series was canceled after one season.

== Cast ==
=== Main ===
- Armani Jackson as Everett Lang, an anxious high school student who was bitten by a werewolf during a forest fire stampede
- Bella Shepard as Blake Navarro, a rebellious high school student who was bitten by a werewolf during a forest fire stampede
- Chloe Rose Robertson as Luna Briggs, a born werewolf, high school senior and Harlan's twin sister
  - Aisling McBee plays a young Luna Briggs
- Tyler Lawrence Gray as Harlan Briggs, a born werewolf, high school senior and Luna's twin brother
  - Julian Wanderer plays a young Harlan Briggs
- Rodrigo Santoro as Garrett Briggs, a California Park Ranger and Harlan and Luna's adoptive father
- Sarah Michelle Gellar as Kristin Ramsey, an arson investigator investigating the cause of the forest fire

=== Recurring ===
- Bailey Stender as Phoebe Caldwell, a high school student who used to be friends with Blake, who survived the forest fire stampede
- Chase Liefeld as Baron, the werewolf who bit and turned Everett and Blake into werewolves
- Hollie Bahar as Prisha Ahmad, a park ranger co-worker of Garrett's and the only person who knows the Briggs's twins secret
- Rainer Dawn as Cody Malcolm, a former love interest of Harlan
- Lanny Joon as Jason Jang, a police officer who works with Ramsey
- Rio Mangini as Austin Kirk, a high school student who survived the forest fire stampede
- Stella Smith as Tia Patterson, a high school student who survived the forest fire stampede
- Zack Nelson as Cyrus Nix, a high school student whose late father was a firefighter and who was not on the bus during the forest fire stampede, also a love interest of Harlan
- James Martinez as Roberto Navarro, Blake and Danny's single father
- Amy Pietz as Kendra Lang, Everett's overly controlling and verbally abusive mother
- John L. Adams as David Lang, Everett's well-meaning but unassertive father who enables his wife's treatment of their son
- Sean Philip Glasgow as Connor Ryan, a high school student and friend of Everett who survived the fire
- Gideon Emery as Malcolm, a firefighter-turned-janitor and Cody's father who works at the local hospital
- Nevada Jose as Danny Navarro, Roberto's son and Blake's younger brother, who is on the autism spectrum

== Episodes ==
No.	Title	Directed by	Written by	Original release date
1	"From a Spark to a Flame"	Jason Ensler	Jeff Davis	January 26, 2023
A deadly fire ravages California and drives a supernatural creature to attack. A few people are killed and many more are injured, including animals. Teenagers Blake Navarro and Everett Lang are bitten. Everett is sent to the hospital to be treated for his injury and discovers that his bite injury has healed mysteriously. While at the hospital, he receives a phone call from an unknown caller telling him to leave the hospital immediately as the creature that bit him will come looking for him. He runs away from the hospital just as Kristin Ramsey, a detective comes looking for him. Blake's bite injury is also healed mysteriously and she struggles to take care of her autistic brother as her parents are going through a difficult split. She sees a vision of Everett in the hospital as does Everett. The two are inexplicably drawn to each other. Meanwhile, Harlan and Luna are two teenage werewolves who know what is behind the mysterious happenings and are looking for their adoptive father. After Blake and Everett are chased by a huge werewolf animal, they run into Harlan and Luna.
2	"Two Bitten, Two Born"	Joseph P. Genier	Emily Eslami & Jeffrey Nieves	February 2, 2023
Harlan and Luna drive Blake and Everett back home. It is revealed that Harlan and Luna were not turned into werewolves but were born that way and that it's their father that is ravaging the country. Luna wants to tell Blake and Everett what is going on but Harlan doesn't trust them. Everett and Blake receive visits from detective Kristen Ramsey. Everett's friend who was also bitten receives a call from a mysterious caller and is attacked by a werewolf.
3	"Origin Point"	Joseph P. Genier	Krystal Houghton Ziv	February 9, 2023
When Everett, Blake, Luna, and Harlan are interrogated by Ramsey and her crew, they create an alibi; when they defend Everett from their first horrifying encounter with the creature, Luna and Harlan uncover a stunning discovery.
4	"Fear and Pain"	Christian Taylor	Carlos Foglia	February 16, 2023
Garrett joins Kristin Ramsey's arson task force in an effort to monitor the investigation and keep his children's secret safe. As Kristin follows new leads and finds disturbing signs in the woods, including a mutilated ram, Garrett offers plausible explanations while trying to steer her suspicions. Meanwhile, the bond among the teen werewolves deepens as they experience shared anxiety and strange physical symptoms, leading to concerns about their growing powers. Luna begins to uncover repressed memories of a traumatic childhood event involving her horse, revealing a darker side of her transformation. Blake attempts to keep her younger brother Danny safe during her shift at work, but when he goes missing after a wolf sighting, she unleashes a primal howl that unites the entire pack. Elsewhere, Harlan continues his tense flirtation with Cyrus, raising further questions about the fire and the boy's past. As the group begins to understand the power of their connection, the danger around them intensifies.
5	"Incendiary"	Mike Elliott	Sean Crouch	February 23, 2023
Garrett teaches a young Harlan how to use his hearing abilities in the woods, but Harlan ends up being chased by a wolf who he somehow knows is his father. The team figures out that the wolf is not trying to hurt them but to protect them because they are part of its pack. The team receives a call from the mysterious caller, who tells them the story of Lycaon and gives them a location. The team arrives there and sees the werewolf murder someone else. Detective Ramsey pays a visit to the school to investigate Cyrus, a student who is suspected of being the arsonist. Ramsey and a security guard find the werewolf's pile of bodies. She tells the officer that the murders were committed by a werewolf and then kills him, letting his body fall on the pile. The team attends a party where the werewolf appears in the swimming pool, causing the party guests to run inside.
6	"After Party"	Katie Eastridge	Krystal Houghton Ziv	March 2, 2023
While inside the house, Everett convinces everyone but Austin that it's a large bear. Ramsey and Garrett arrive with the police and shut down the party while looking for Cyrus. Everett continues to see a teenager that nobody can see but him. After talking with a survivor, Malcolm, (Gideon Emery) from another fire that occurred years ago, the pack learns that there were two wolves and one was killed while the other killed Malcolm's crew in revenge. Harlan begins to shift when he learns Garrett convinced Cyrus to turn himself into the police. Only when Prisha shows up and Garrett calls out Harlan's name does the pack revert back to themselves. Everett discovers the teenager he is seeing the werewolf stalking them as well as its name, Baron, Harlan and Luna's brother.
7	"Lion's Breath"	Christian Taylor	Carlos Foglia & Alessandra Jara Del Castillo	March 9, 2023
After learning the wolf's identity, they form a plan to trap Baron and turn him back to human by using Austin as bait. They trap Baron in a freezer and he reverts to human as his heart stops. As they try to revive him, Austin stabs Baron with a silver-laced dagger and Baron screams in pain. Meanwhile, Ramsey is revealed to be a werewolf and the one that killed Malcolm's crew.
8	"Trophic Cascade"	Jeff Davis	Jeff Davis	March 16, 2023
As the injured Baron is brought to Everett's home, he experiences vivid visions tied to each member of the pack, revealing their memories and emotional struggles. Garrett demands Baron be taken to the hospital, but the plan unravels when Malcolm abducts Baron in a plot for revenge. Kristin Ramsey, now revealed to have deeper knowledge of the supernatural events, begins to tighten her control over the teens—placing Everett under psychiatric hold and gaining temporary custody of Blake and Danny. Luna, suspicious of Kristin's motives, notices her eavesdropping on Harlan, prompting the group to investigate her further. Garrett confronts Kristin after a violent showdown at the fire station, where Malcolm attempts to kill her with silver weapons. In the aftermath, Kristin reveals she is the biological mother of Harlan, Luna, and Baron, having entrusted them to Garrett years earlier. She insists the pack's survival depends on her guidance, leaving the group to grapple with new truths about their origins, loyalties, and the path forward.

== Production ==
=== Development ===
In September 2021, it was announced that Jeff Davis was developing a series based on Edo van Belkom's Wolf Pack novels for Paramount+.

In addition to Davis, Joe Genier, Mike Elliott and Karen Gorodetzky serve as executive producers for Capital Arts. Jason Ensler, Sarah Michelle Gellar and Christian Taylor also serve as executive producers. The series premiered on January 26 and concluded on March 16, 2023.

During an interview in September 2022, Jeff Davis stated that although Wolf Pack and Teen Wolf use the same Atlanta studio facilities and share part of the backstage crew, as well as both shows involving young werewolves, the two fictional universes are completely separate and the mythology and creatures involved are different.

Despite some preparations having been made for a second season, the series was canceled in January 2024.

=== Casting ===
On June 20, 2022, Paramount+ announced that Chloe Rose Robertson, Bella Shepard, Armani Jackson, and Tyler Lawrence Gray had signed on to play the leads of the streamer's upcoming supernatural teen drama series. Sarah Michelle Gellar made a special appearance during the Teen Wolf panel at San Diego Comic-Con on July 21 to announce that she had joined the main cast of the show. On September 14, Rodrigo Santoro was announced to have also joined the main cast.

On October 7, the streamer also announced new recurring cast members for the first season.

=== Filming ===
Principal photography on Wolf Pack began on July 21, 2022, and ran through the middle of November 2022. While the show is set in and around Southern California, the producers chose to film in Atlanta, Georgia, mainly due to that state's generous tax credit program for television production. Working in Georgia can offset the cost of production by as much as 30 percent of the total budget.

== Reception ==
=== Critical response ===
The review aggregator website Rotten Tomatoes reported a 44% approval rating with an average rating of 4.9/10, based on 27 critic reviews. Most reviews were of the first 2 episodes, which were provided to reviewers ahead of the series' premiere. The website's critics consensus reads, "Genre queen Sarah Michelle Gellar does her best to lead this Wolf Pack, but it isn't enough to salvage a spinoff that doesn't quite sink its teeth deep enough into the source material." Metacritic, which uses a weighted average, assigned a score of 40 out of 100 based on 12 critics, indicating "mixed or average reviews".

In his review for The Guardian, Jack Seale gave 1/5 stars to the first episode of the series, criticizing the wooden acting, nonsensical dialogue, and incomprehensible plot. The review for Variety declared Wolf Pack's "biggest selling point was Sarah Michelle Gellar's return to a supernatural teen drama —but even her performance is wan and lacks impact".

=== Audience viewership ===
On March 1, 2023, TheWrap named Wolf Pack as one of "the most in-demand series", based on data collected by ParrotAnalytics.com. According to Media Play News, the series was the 8th most watched original series across all streaming platforms in the United States during the week of February 5, 2023, the 9th during the week of February 19, the 10th during the week of March 5, the 9th during the week of March 12, and the 10th during the week of March 19.
