= Bella Shepard =

American actress (born 2001)

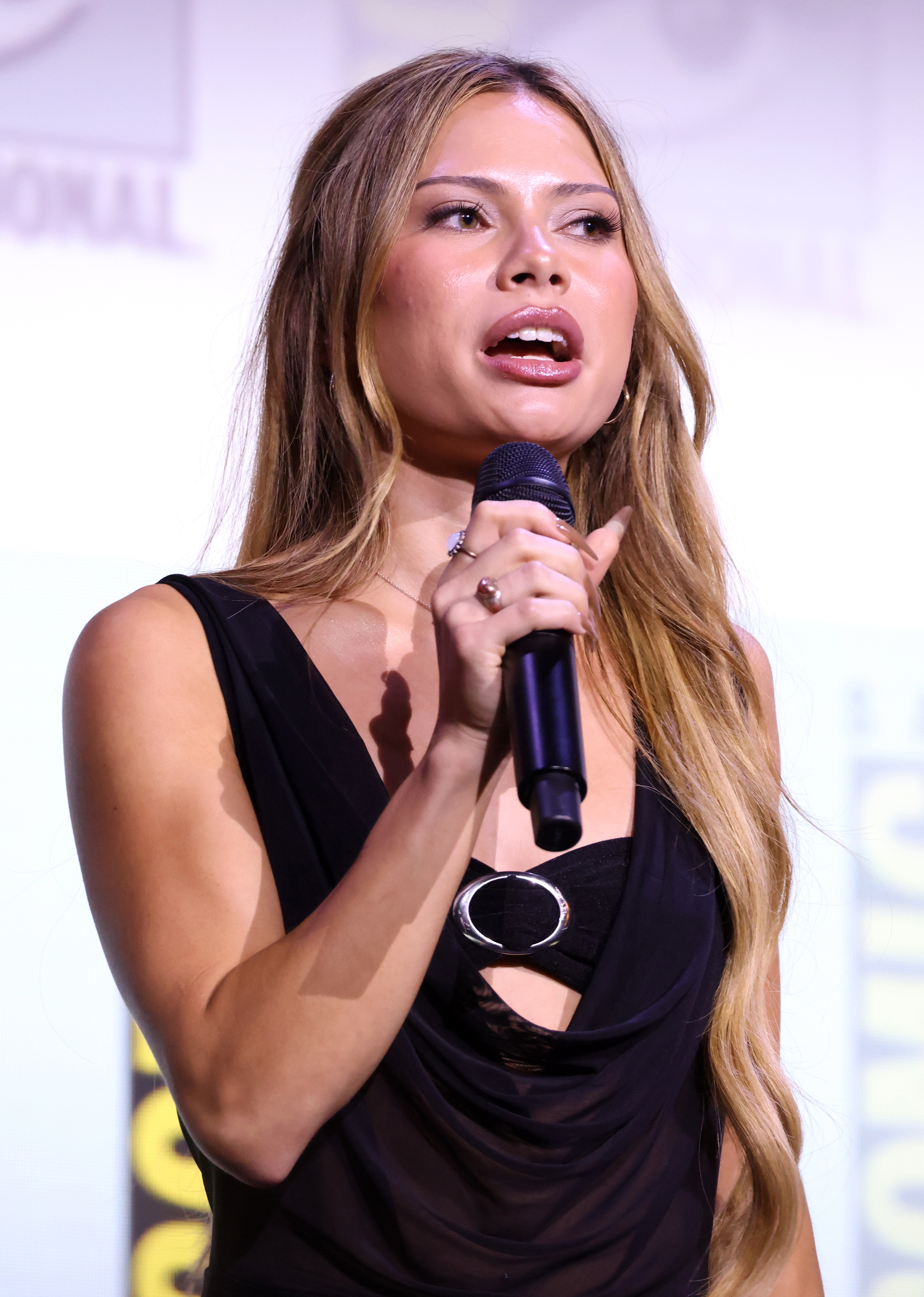
Bella Shepard (2025)

Bella Shepard (born 17 December 2001) is an American actor.

== Life and career ==
Bella Shepard was born in Royal Oak, Michigan, and grew up in Waterford, Flint, and Grand Blanc. She started her career as a child actress, debuting in a small speaking role in the 2013 film Oz the Great and Powerful after her grandmother had submitted her photo for an open call. She later appeared in the television series My Haunted House in 2015, shortly after moving to Los Angeles. That same year, she had a role in Life in Pieces. She also appeared in Grace and Frankie.

From 2018 to 2019, the adult Shepard was part of the main cast of the series A Girl Named Jo, where she played Alice Hargrave, a role she described as evolving significantly over the show's three seasons. She noted that the series aimed to introduce themes related to the civil rights movement to a younger audience. Shepard appeared in the seventh season of Orange Is the New Black, portraying a younger version of Aleida Diaz. She prepared for the role by studying Elizabeth Rodriguez's performance and working on the character's dialect.

Shepard continued her career with additional episodic roles, including a 2022 appearance on iCarly. In 2023, she received a leading role in the eight‑episode television series Wolf Pack.

Since 2026, she has portrayed Genesis Lythe, an ambitious cadet at the titular Starfleet Academy, in Star Trek: Starfleet Academy. Her character belongs to the Dar‑Sha, a new species distinguished by facial ridges and the absence of eyebrows. Shepard has said that Star Trek feels nostalgic to her because her grandparents watched the original 1960s Star Trek series.

== Filmography ==
Film
Year	Title	Role	Notes
2013	Oz the Great and Powerful		
2016	Pop Music		Short film
2018	Anonymous 616		
2019	Ring of Silence		
2019	Enigma		
2021	Witch Hunt		
2021	Maxx Speed		Short film
2024	The Merry Gentlemen		
2026	Jump		In production in Queensland

Television
Year	Title	Role	Notes
2015	Homes of Horror		Episode: "My Haunted House"
2015	Life in Pieces		2 episodes
2018	Grace and Frankie		1 episode
2018–2019	A Girl Named Jo		Main cast
2019	On the Ropes		Main cast
2019	Orange Is the New Black		1 episode
2019	The Secret Lives of Cheerleaders		TV movie
2020	The Wilds		1 episode
2021	Two Sides		Main cast (season 2)
2022	iCarly		1 episode
2023	Wolf Pack		Main cast
2026–present	Star Trek: Starfleet Academy		Main cast
