= Kerrice Brooks =

American actor

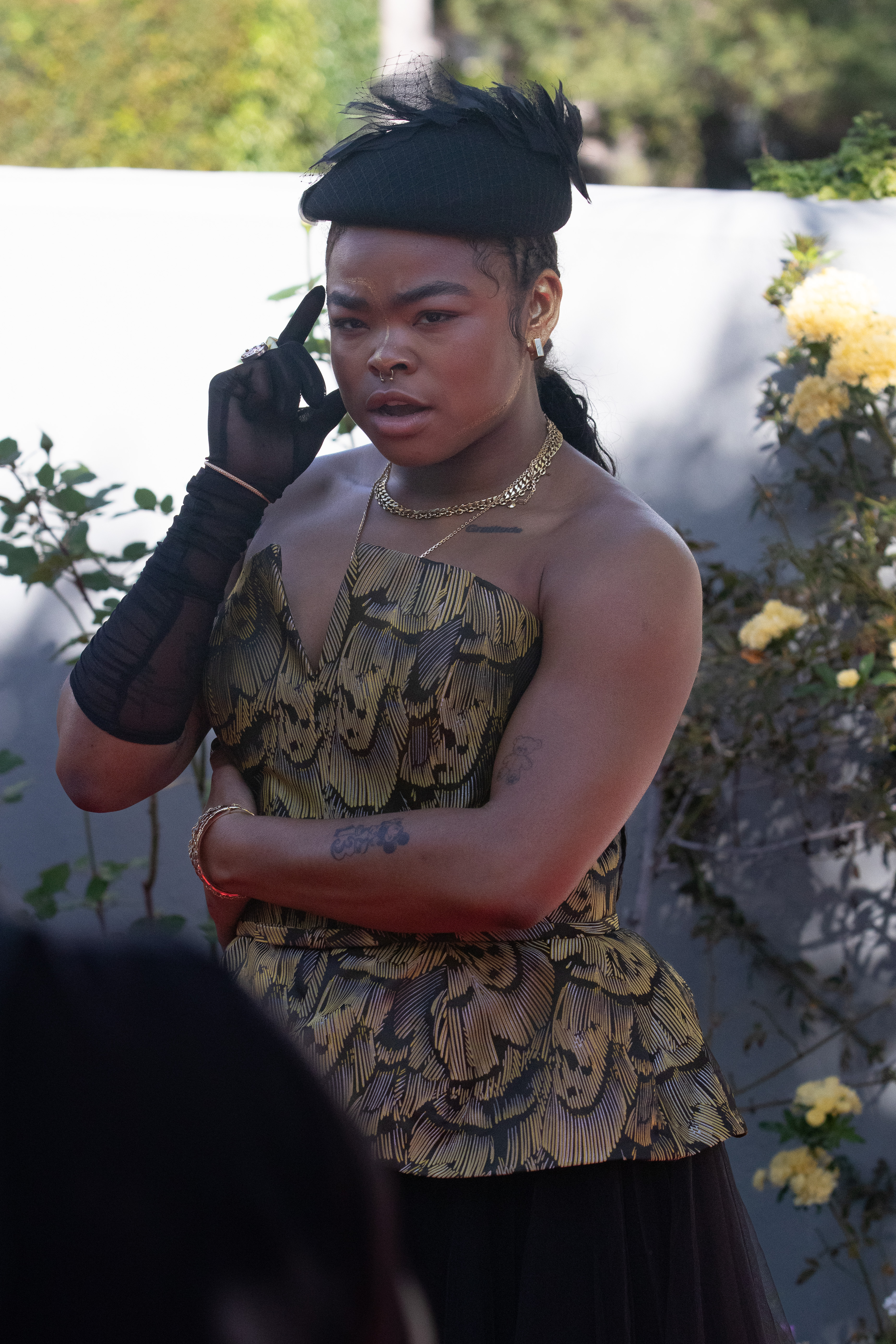
Kerrice Brooks (2026)

Kerrice Ayanna Brooks is an American actor and dancer. She gained international recognition for her role as SAM (Series Acclimation Mil) in the television series Star Trek: Starfleet Academy.

== Career ==
Brooks began her professional career as a dancer, performing with artists such as Billie Eilish, Kanye West, Lil Nas X, and Kelly Rowland. Her early screen roles include appearances in The Prom, The Cypher, How We Roll, and On My Block. In 2024, she made her feature‑film debut in the coming‑of‑age film My Old Ass and also appeared in the 1970s‑set comedy Feeling Randy (2024).

=== Star Trek: Starfleet Academy ===
In 2024, Brooks was announced as part of the main cast of Star Trek: Starfleet Academy, in which she portrays the holographic cadet SAM (Series Acclimation Mil) from the planet Kasq, who becomes the first of her kind to be admitted to the academy. According to showrunner Alex Kurtzman, the character had originally been conceived differently but was re‑envisioned after Brooks's audition. By her own account, in her youth Brooks had initially avoided Star Trek, and only later found her way into the franchise through Star Trek: Discovery. To prepare for the role, the production provided her with a curated list of episodes, primarily from Deep Space Nine and Voyager. During filming, she began watching Deep Space Nine in full. In 2025, she publicly described Star Trek as a "beacon of hope". Brooks cited Jake Sisko, Data, and David Jonsson's portrayal of the android Andy in Alien: Romulus as acting touchstones. She explained that working on SAM involved accessing her "inner child", and she developed a fictional journal to document the character's time allocation and learning processes.

In January 2026, Brooks appeared together with Holly Hunter and other cast members of Star Trek: Starfleet Academy on NBC's Kelly Clarkson Show to promote the series.
