= Comic strip syndication =

Sale of comic strips to newspapers

A comic strip syndicate functions as an agent for cartoonists and comic strip creators, placing the cartoons and strips in as many newspapers as possible on behalf of the artist. A syndicate can annually receive thousands of submissions, from which only two or three might be selected for representation. In some cases, the work will be owned by the syndicate as opposed to the creator. The Guinness World Record for the world's most syndicated strip belongs to Jim Davis' Garfield, which at that point (2002) appeared in 2,570 newspapers, with 263 million readers worldwide.

As of 2017, the leading strip syndicates are Andrews McMeel Syndication, King Features Syndicate, and Creators Syndicate, with the Tribune Content Agency and The Washington Post Writers Group also in the running. Andrews McMeel syndicates more than 150 comic strips and news features. Andrews McMeel also owns and operates GoComics, a website featuring comic strips currently syndicated by Andrews McMeel, as well as discontinued titles such as Calvin and Hobbes, The Boondocks, and Bloom County; webcomics such as Pibgorn and Kliban; plus a selection of syndicated comic strips from Creators Syndicate and Tribune Content Agency. King Features syndicates 150 comic strips, newspaper columns, editorial cartoons, puzzles and games to nearly 5,000 newspapers worldwide. Creators syndicates close to 60 strips and 20 editorial cartoonists.

== Strip submissions ==
In Syd Hoff's The Art of Cartooning, King Features Syndicate comics editor Sylvan Byck, who served in that position for more than 25 years, observed that King Features received more than a thousand strip proposals annually, but chose only one each year. Byck offered some tips regarding strip submissions, including the creation of central characters with warmth and charm and the avoidance of "themes that are too confining," as he explained:

Although characterization is the most important element of a comic, the cartoonist also must cope with the problem of choosing a theme for his new strip. What will it be about? Actually, it is possible to do a successful comic strip about almost anything or anybody if the writing and drawing are exactly right for the chosen subject. In general, though, it is best to stay away from themes that are too confining. If you achieve your goal of syndication, you want your strip to last a long time. You don't want to run out of ideas after a few weeks or months. In humor strips, it is better to build around a character than around a job. For example, it is possible to do some very funny comic strip gags about a taxi driver. But a strip that is limited to taxi driver gags is bound to wear thin pretty fast. I'd rather see a strip about a warmly funny man who just happens to earn his living as a cabbie and whose job is only a minor facet of his potential for inspiring gags. Narrative strips can be and often are based on the central character's job. For example, the basis of a private eye strip is the work he does. But even here the strip will only be as successful as the characterization in it. The big question is: what kind of a man is this particular private eye?

Of the strips that successfully reach syndication, only about one-quarter survive longer than a year or two.

== Contracts and creator ownership ==
Historically, syndicates owned the creators' work — the name, characters, and likenesses — enabling them to continue publishing the strip after the original creator retired, left the strip, or died. An early example of this practice was Rudolph Dirks' hugely successful comic strip, The Katzenjammer Kids, which first appeared in print in 1897. In 1912, Dirks challenged publisher William Randolph Hearst for ownership rights to his comic strip, and ultimately Hearst prevailed. This practice led to "legacy strips" (or more pejoratively "zombie strips") — strips taken over by other creators — which are often criticized as lacking the "spark" that originally made the strip successful. Most syndicates signed creators to ten- or even twenty-year contracts. (There have been exceptions, however, such as Bud Fisher's Mutt and Jeff being an early — if not the earliest — case in which the creator retained ownership of his work from the outset.)

Milton Caniff was another of several important cartoonists who had tried unsuccessfully to secure rights to their creations. In 1946, he walked away from the enormously popular Terry and the Pirates comic strip because his syndicate insisted that they own his creation. In 1947 Caniff created Steve Canyon because Marshall Field III, who owned Field Newspaper Syndicate, allowed him to own the rights to his comic strip. Also in 1947, according to publisher Denis Kitchen, Al Capp, creator of the hugely popular Li'l Abner, "sued United Feature Syndicate for $14 million, publicly embarrassed UFS in Li'l Abner, and wrested ownership and control of his creation the following year."

== Changing syndicates ==
Most strips stay with the same syndicate over the course of their run (not counting instances where syndicates merge with each other, are acquired, or change names). Over the years, however, for various reasons, a few notable strips changed syndicates. AP Newsfeatures closed down in 1961 and McNaught Syndicate closed down in 1989, prompting a number of strips to end their runs or move to other syndicates. Sometimes — as in the case of strips like The World's Greatest Superheroes or Poor Arnold's Almanac — a strip took a long hiatus and when it returned to syndication it was with a new company.

A watershed moment came in early 1987, when Creators Syndicate was born in response to King Features' acquisition of News America Syndicate and the resulting consolidation of strip syndication. After Creators was founded, Milton Caniff sent Creators founder Richard S. Newcombe a postcard saying, "To put it on the record: Hooray!!!" Pulitzer Prize-winning cartoonist Mike Peters told Editor & Publisher magazine, "It's long overdue that syndicates realize a new day is here. Indentured servitude went out in the 1500s." Johnny Hart, creator of B.C. and The Wizard of Id, called Creators "a history-making venture in syndication." Bil Keane, creator of The Family Circus, described Creators Syndicate as "the first breath of fresh air the syndicates have had in 100 years of existence." A number of prominent strips moved from King Features (and News America) to the independent company Creators.

The following is a list of notable comic strips that, for various reasons, changed syndicates:

- Andy Capp — Publishers-Hall Syndicate (1957–1975), Field Newspaper Syndicate/News America Syndicate (1975–c. 1987), Creators Syndicate (c. 1987–present)
- B.C. — New York Herald Tribune Syndicate (1958–1966), Publishers Syndicate / Publishers-Hall Syndicate / Field Newspaper Syndicate / News America Syndicate / North America Syndicate (1967–1987), Creators Syndicate (1987–present)
- Bizarro — Chronicle Features (1985–1995), Universal Press Syndicate (1995–2003), King Features Syndicate (2003–present)
- The Bungle Family — McClure Newspaper Syndicate (1919–1924), McNaught Syndicate (1924–1942), Self-syndicated (1943–1945)
- For Better or For Worse — Universal Press Syndicate (1979–1997, 2004–present), United Feature Syndicate (1997–2004)
- The Dinette Set — King Features (1997–c. 2006), Creators Syndicate (c. 2006 – Jan. 2010), United Feature Syndicate (May 2010–Nov. 29, 2015)
- Foxy Grandpa — New York Herald, W.R. Hearst, American-Journal-Examiner, Publishers Press (C.J. Mar), Associated Newspapers, New York Press, New York Herald (again), Philadelphia Bulletin
- Fred Basset — Hall Syndicate / Publishers-Hall Syndicate (1960s–1975), Field Newspaper Syndicate (1975–1984), King Features Syndicate, Tribune Media Services, Universal Press Syndicate (2001–2009), Andrews McMeel Syndication (2009–present)
- Garfield — United Feature Syndicate (1978–1993), Universal Press Syndicate (1994–present)
- Grin and Bear It — Chicago Times Syndicate, United Feature Syndicate, Field Enterprises, Publishers-Hall Syndicate, News America Syndicate, North America Syndicate
- Heathcliff — McNaught Syndicate (1973–1988), Creators Syndicate (1988–present)
- Li'l Abner — United Feature Syndicate (1933–1964), Chicago Tribune New York News Syndicate (1964–1977)
- Loose Parts — Los Angeles Times Syndicate (1998–2000), Tribune Media Services (2000–2014), The Washington Post Writers Group, (2014–2022) Andrews McMeel Syndication (2022–present)
- Mark Trail — New York Post Syndicate, Post-Hall Syndicate, Hall Syndicate, Publishers-Hall Syndicate, Field Enterprises, News America Syndicate, North America Syndicate
- Miss Peach — New York Herald Tribune (1957–1966), Publisher Syndicate / Field Newspaper Syndicate / News America Syndicate (1966–1986), Creators Syndicate (1987–2002)
- Momma — Publishers-Hall (1970–1987), Creators Syndicate (1987–2016)
- Mother Goose and Grimm — Tribune Media Services (1984–2002), King Features (2003–present)
- Mutt and Jeff — King Features Syndicate (1907–1915), Wheeler Syndicate (1915–1916), Bell Syndicate (1916–c. 1944), Field Newspaper Syndicate (c. 1944–1983)
- Napoleon and Uncle Elby — LaFave Newspaper Features (1932–1952), Mirror Enterprises Syndicate (1952–1961)
- Reg'lar Fellers — Bell Syndicate (1917–1924), George Matthew Adams Service (1924–1929), King Features (1929–1942), Associated Newspapers (1942–1949)
- Sherman's Lagoon — Creators Syndicate (1991–1997), King Features Syndicate (1997–present)
- Shoe — Tribune Media Services (1977–2008), King Features Syndicate (2008–present)
- Steve Canyon — Field Enterprises, Sun and Times Company, Publishers Syndicate, Publishers-Hall Syndicate, Field Enterprises, News America Syndicate, North America Syndicate
- Tumbleweeds — Lew Little Enterprises (1965–1967), Register & Tribune Syndicate (1967–1972), King Features Syndicate (1972–1977), United Feature Syndicate (1977–1980), Field Enterprises (1980–1984), News America Syndicate (1984–1986), North America Syndicate (1986–2007)
- Wee Pals — Lew Little Enterprises (1965), Register and Tribune Syndicate (1965-1970s), King Features, United Feature Syndicate, Field Enterprises / News America Syndicate / North America Syndicate, Creators Syndicate (1980s–present)
- The Wizard of Id — Publishers Newspaper Syndicate / North America Syndicate (1964–1989), Creators Syndicate (1989–present)

== History ==
=== Origins (1900s–1910s) ===
Comic strip syndication services began operating in the opening years of the 20th century. The first syndicate to distribute comic strips was the McClure Newspaper Syndicate (founded in 1884), which began syndicating comic strips circa 1901. (McClure's more notable strips included Billy Bounce, by W. W. Denslow and later by C. W. Kahles, [1901–1906]; Superman, which it syndicated beginning in 1939; and Batman and Robin, debuting in 1943.)

Beginning about 1905, Joseph Pulitzer's New York World began syndicating strips to other newspapers under the name World Feature Service; in circa 1910 it added the syndication division New York World Press Publishing (also known as Press Publishing Co.). The Newspaper Enterprise Association, (NEA), founded by E. W. Scripps in 1902, began syndicating comic strips by 1909.

The Associated Newspapers syndicate, run by S. S. McClure's cousin H. H. McClure, was launched in 1912, it was a cooperative of four newspapers: The New York Globe, the Chicago Daily News, The Boston Globe, and the Philadelphia Bulletin.

John Neville Wheeler's Wheeler Syndicate debuted in 1913, contracting with pioneering comic strip artist Bud Fisher and cartoonist Fontaine Fox to begin distributing their work. Fisher is reported to have received an annual guarantee of $52,000, an unprecedented amount at that time. The Wheeler Syndicate was purchased by the McClure Syndicate in 1916; Wheeler immediately founded another operation, the Bell Syndicate, and re-acquired cartoonists Fisher and Fox.

In 1914, William Randolph Hearst founded King Features, the oldest comics syndicate still in operation. Popular, long-running King strips launched during this period included The Katzenjammer Kids (1897–2006) and Thimble Theatre/Popeye (1919–present).

Also launched c. 1914 was the New York Herald Syndicate, known for most of its operation as the New York Herald Tribune Syndicate. The Syndicate's first comic strip of note was Clare Briggs' Mr. and Mrs., which debuted in 1919.

The Public Ledger Syndicate was launched in 1915 by Philadelphia Public Ledger publisher Cyrus H. K. Curtis. The Ledger Syndicates' most notable strips during its 30 years in operation were A. E. Hayward's Somebody's Stenog; Hairbreadth Harry (by C. W. Kahles and later by F. O. Alexander); Frank Godwin's Connie and Babe Bunting; Joe Bowers' Dizzy Dramas; Clare Victor Dwiggins ("Dwig")'s Footprints on the Sands of Time and Nipper; and Roy Powers, Eagle Scout ("the official strip of the Boy Scouts of America").

The George Matthew Adams Service debuted in 1916, which syndicated such strips as Billy DeBeck's Finn an' Haddie, Robert Baldwin's Freddy, Edwina Dumm's Cap Stubbs and Tippie and Ed Wheelan's Minute Movies. Adams' syndicate peaked in the 1920s and 1930s.

Cartoonist Sidney Smith's popular strip The Gumps, which debuted in the Chicago Tribune in 1917, played a key role in the rise of syndication. Joseph Medill Patterson founded the Chicago Tribune Syndicate in 1918, managed by Arthur Crawford. In 1919, Patterson and Robert R. McCormick, who had been co-publishing the Chicago Tribune since 1914, planned to launch a tabloid in New York. As comics historian Coulton Waugh explained:

So originated on June 16, 1919, the Illustrated Daily News, a title which, as too English, was almost at once clipped to Daily News. It was a picture paper, and it was a perfect setting for the newly developed art of the comic strip. The first issue shows but a single strip, The Gumps. It was the almost instant popularity of this famous strip that directly brought national syndication into being. Midwestern and other papers began writing to the Chicago Tribune, which also published The Gumps, requesting to be allowed to use the new comic, and the result was that the heads of the two papers collaborated and founded the Chicago Tribune New York News Syndicate, which soon was distributing Tribune-News features to every nook and cranny of the country.

Now known as Tribune Content Agency, the syndicate continues to provide content to newspapers.

=== Continued growth (1920s–1930s) ===
Notable strips launched by the New York Herald Tribune Syndicate in the 1920s included Harrison Cady's Peter Rabbit, Charles A. Voight's Betty (which had originated with the McClure Syndicate), Crawford Young's Clarence, and H. T. Webster's The Timid Soul (later known as Caspar Milquetoast). All of those strips had long syndication runs of at least 25 years.

The McNaught Syndicate was founded in 1922, with one of its first notable syndicated strips being those of Rube Goldberg. McNaught's line-up of comic strips included Dixie Dugan and Mickey Finn. Ham Fisher's Joe Palooka was one of the McNaught Syndicate's big successes.

The Des Moines Register launched the long-running Register and Tribune Syndicate in 1922 as well; its most notable cartoons and comic strips included The Family Circus (debuting in 1960), which was eventually distributed to more than 1,000 newspapers. It also syndicated The Amazing Spider-Man, which debuted in 1977 and ran until 2019.

In 1925, Chicago-area businessmen Harold H. Anderson and Eugene Conley launched the Publishers Newspaper Syndicate, later to be known for such popular, long-running strips as Big Chief Wahoo / Steve Roper, Mary Worth, Kerry Drake, Rex Morgan, M.D., Judge Parker, and Apartment 3-G.

The Associated Press launched its syndicate (later known as AP Newsfeatures) in 1930 with nine comic strips, including John Terry's Scorchy Smith. It added Sunday strips a decade later, in 1940.

In 1930, the North American Newspaper Alliance absorbed the Bell Syndicate, both continuing to operate individually under joint ownership as the Bell Syndicate-North American Newspaper Alliance. That same year, Bell acquired Associated Newspapers. Keeping Associated Newspapers as a division, at that point the company became the Bell-McClure Syndicate.

King Features had a series of hits during the 1930s with the launch of Blondie (1930–present), Flash Gordon (1934–2003), Mandrake the Magician (1934–2013), and The Phantom (1936–present).

United Feature Syndicate (founded in 1919) became a dominant player in the comic strip syndication market in the early 1930s. In March 1930, United Features acquired the Metropolitan Newspaper Service (ostensibly from the Bell Syndicate). And in late February 1931, Scripps acquired the New York World, which controlled the syndication arms of the Pulitzer company: World Feature Service and Press Publishing Co. (which unlike other syndicates were owned by the paper rather than being separate entities). United Feature and the Newspaper Enterprise Association both became successful distributors of newspaper comics in the 1930s. An April 1933 article in Fortune described the "Big Four" American syndicates as United Feature Syndicate, King Features Syndicate, the Chicago Tribune Syndicate, and the Bell-McClure Syndicate. Later that year, the Chicago Tribune Syndicate changed its name to the Tribune-New York (Daily) News Syndicate (eventually becoming Tribune Content Agency).

In 1933, just as the concept of "comic books" was getting off the ground, Eastern Color Printing published Funnies on Parade, which reprinted in color several comic strips licensed from the Ledger Syndicate, the McNaught Syndicate, and the Bell-McClure Syndicate. Eastern Color neither sold this periodical nor made it available on newsstands, but rather sent it out free as a promotional item to consumers who mailed in coupons clipped from Procter & Gamble soap and toiletries products. The company printed 10,000 copies, and it was a great success. Eventually, Gaines and Eastern collaborated in 1934 to publish the ongoing title Famous Funnies, which ran for 218 issues using a mixture of newspaper strip reprints and some original material, and is considered the first true American comic book.

Also in 1933, Editors Press Service launched; though never a large operation, EPS is notable for being the first U.S. company to actively syndicate material internationally.

=== The boom years (1940s–1950s) ===
Marshall Field III launched the Chicago Sun Syndicate (later known as the Field Newspaper Syndicate) in 1941, whose most popular offering was the comic strip Steve Canyon.

In the 1940s, the Register and Tribune Syndicate's The Spirit (by Will Eisner) was part of a 16-page Sunday supplement known colloquially as "The Spirit Section". This was a tabloid-sized newsprint comic book sold as part of eventually 20 Sunday newspapers with a combined circulation of as many as five million copies.

During the final months of World War II, Robert M. Hall (who had worked at United Feature Syndicate in the 1930s) began his own syndicate. Soon Hall developed his own features, including a variety of comic strips: Debbie Dean, Mark Trail and Bruce Gentry, along with Herblock's editorial cartoons. Beginning in April 1959, Feiffer was distributed nationally by the Hall Syndicate.

The Times Mirror Company launched Mirror Enterprises Syndicate in the late 1940s; it eventually became known as the Los Angeles Times Syndicate and was known for syndicating the Star Wars newspaper strip from 1979 to 1984.

Cartoonist Al Smith (mostly known for his long run on Mutt and Jeff) launched his own syndication service — mainly serving weekly newspapers — in 1951. Early on, the syndicate partnered with the Chicago Tribune Syndicate. At its height, the service distributed 25 features, by such notable names as Pat Boyette, Warren Sattler, Don Sherwood, Frank Thomas, George Wolfe, and Smith himself. Smith died in 1986, with the Al Smith Feature Service continued by his daughters until c. 1999.

In September 1952, the Bell-McClure Syndicate acquired the historic McClure Newspaper Syndicate, with Louis Ruppel installed as president and editor.

King Features, meanwhile, remained a "powerhouse" syndicate throughout the 1950s and the 1960s.

=== Consolidation and changing times (1960s and 1970s) ===
In 1963, Chicago-based Field Enterprises and New York Herald Tribune publisher John Hay Whitney acquired Publishers Syndicate, merging Publishers' existing syndication operations with the New York Herald Tribune Syndicate, Field's Chicago Sun-Times Syndicate, and the syndicate of the Chicago Daily News (a newspaper that had been acquired by Field Enterprises in 1959). When the New York Herald Tribune folded in 1966, Publishers inherited their strips, including B.C., Miss Peach, and Penny.

The George Matthew Adams Service petered out in the mid-1960s after the death of Adams in 1962; in 1966 the Adams Service's remaining assets and features were acquired by The Washington Star to form the Washington Star Syndicate (which never had much traction in the comic strip market).

In 1967, Field Enterprises acquired the Hall Syndicate, merging it with the previously acquired Publishers Syndicate to form the Publishers-Hall Syndicate.

By the mid-1960s competition from television and other media began to dilute the central place of comic strips in American lives. As comics historian Maurice Horn writes, "the 1960s were the decade during which the comics syndicates were most blatantly aping successful television shows in a desperate (and vain) attempt at regaining their fast-disappearing readership."

In 1968, an Editor & Publisher survey of a selection of syndicates revealed the following details about the syndicates, the number of features offered, and the number of client papers:

- Chicago Tribune-New York News Syndicate (150 features; 1400 newspapers)
- Newspaper Enterprise Association (NEA) (75 features; 750 newspapers)
- United Feature Syndicate (50 features; 1500 newspapers)
- Columbia Features (45 features; 1000 newspapers)
- National Newspaper Syndicate (35 features; 650 newspapers)

Starting in the late 1960s and running through the 1970s, underground comics strips were syndicated, first by the Underground Press Syndicate and then the Rip Off Press Syndicate (ROPS), both of which sold weekly content to alternative newspapers and student publications. Artists and strips by the likes of Robert Crumb, Gilbert Shelton (Wonder Wart-Hog, The Fabulous Furry Freak Brothers, Fat Freddy's Cat, and Motoring Tips), Joel Beck (Cartoon Cavalcade), Dave Sheridan (Dealer McDope and Nerds), Ted Richards (Forty Year Old Hippie and E.Z. Wolf), Bill Griffith (Griffith Observatory and Zippy), and R. Diggs (Mom Squad) gained wide exposure through these services. As the underground press and underground comix booms petered out by the mid-1970s, both services wound down, with the Rip Off Press Syndicate being discontinued by 1979. Griffith's Zippy strip, however, which had debuted in 1976 as a weekly strip from ROPS, was picked up for daily syndication in 1986 by King Features Syndicate.

John McMeel was assistant general manager and national sales director for the Publishers-Hall Syndicate when he began Universal Press Syndicate in 1970. When Gary Trudeau's Doonesbury, another product of the counterculture of the 1960s, debuted as a daily strip in two dozen newspapers on October 26, 1970, it was the first strip from Universal Press Syndicate, and a Sunday strip was launched March 21, 1971. Circulation of Doonesbury eventually expanded to more than 1,400 newspapers internationally. At first, ownership of the strips was in the hands of both the artist and the syndicate.

In 1972, United Features Syndicate acquired the combined operations of the North American Newspaper Alliance and the Bell-McClure Syndicate and absorbed them into United Features' operations.

The McNaught Syndicate's last success came with the comic strip Heathcliff, which they syndicated from the start in 1973 until the late 1980s. Heathcliff appeared in some 1,000 newspapers, and the McNaught Syndicate became the production company for a few Heathcliff movies, including Heathcliff: The Movie from 1986.

In 1975, Field Enterprises absorbed Publishers-Hall into its Field Newspaper Syndicate, consolidating control of such popular, long-running strips as Mary Worth, Steve Roper, Penny, Kerry Drake, Rex Morgan, M.D., Judge Parker, Miss Peach, B.C., The Wizard of Id, Dennis the Menace, Funky Winkerbean, Mark Trail, and Momma.

By the fall of 1977, 300 American syndicates, large and small, were distributing 10,000 features with combined sales of $100 million a year.

In February 1978, the Washington Star Syndicate was sold (along with its parent company) to Time Inc. A little more than a year later, the Universal Press Syndicate acquired the Star Syndicate from the remaining assets of the Washington Star Company.

In May 1978 Scripps merged United Feature Syndicate and the Newspaper Enterprise Association to form United Media Enterprises. Although the Washington Post Writers Group was formed in 1973, it didn't begin syndicating comic strips until 1980 with Berkeley Breathed's popular strip Bloom County.

=== Further consolidation and upheaval (1980s–1990s) ===
The 1980s was a period of consolidation and upheaval in the syndicated comics strip business. In 1983, Rupert Murdoch's News Corporation purchased the Field Newspaper Syndicate, renaming it News America Syndicate (NAS) in 1984.

In 1986, the Register and Tribune Syndicate was sold to Hearst and King Features for $4.3 million. Late in that year, the Chicago Tribune estimated that the country's top three comic strip syndicates were Hearst's King Features, Scripps' United Media, and News Corp's NAS. In late December of that same year, Hearst bought NAS (which the company renamed North America Syndicate). The pending sale of NAS (which was first reported in October 1986), prompted NAS president Richard S. Newcombe to leave the company in January 1987 and, using financial backing from London-based publisher Robert Maxwell, form Creators Syndicate before the close of the NAS sale.

Creators Syndicate originated on February 13, 1987. Within a month, Creators Syndicate acquired the syndication rights to the worldwide comic strip B.C., and a few months after that acquired the syndication rights to the cartoon works of Herblock. Creators became one of the few successful independent syndicates founded since the 1930s; it was also the first syndicate to allow cartoonists ownership rights to their work.

By this point (mid-1987), the top syndicates, by number of features, ranked as follows:

1. King Features Syndicate (Hearst Corporation) 194
2. North America Syndicate (Hearst Corporation) 122
3. Tribune Media Services (Tribune Company) 120
4. United Feature Syndicate (United Media) 85
5. Los Angeles Times Syndicate (Times Mirror Company) 85
6. Newspaper Enterprise Association (United Media) 76
7. Universal Press Syndicate 74
8. New York Times Syndication Sales (New York Times Company) 51
9. The Washington Post Writers Group (The Washington Post Company) 37
10. McNaught Syndicate (independent) 24

Hearst (King Features and NAS) led the way with 316 features, United Media (United Feature Syndicate and NEA) ranked second with 161, and the Tribune Company (Tribune Media Services) was third with 120 features.

The McNaught Syndicate eventually folded in September 1989.

Beginning in 1990, following the lead of Creators, Universal Press Syndicate gave strip creators full rights to their respective works. The company also instituted a policy that any cartoonist who was with them for five years or more received four weeks a year of vacation.

In 1996, Universal Press Syndicate formed Universal New Media, later known as Uclick, to distribute "digital entertainment content."

A 1997 article in The Washington Post gave the number of syndicates which distributed comic strips as nine, specifically mentioning United Media, Creators Syndicate, Universal Press Syndicate, The Washington Post Writers Group, and Chronicle Features. (Not mentioned were King Features, the Tribune Company Syndicate, The New York Times Syndicate, and the Los Angeles Times Syndicate.)

Later in 1997, Universal Press Syndicate acquired and eventually absorbed Chronicle Features. (It had earlier acquired notable Chronicle Features strips The Far Side, Bizarro, and the editorial cartoons of Ted Rall).

=== Further consolidation (2000s) ===
Upon the acquisition of Times Mirror Company in 2000, the Los Angeles Times Syndicate was merged into Tribune Media Services, which still operates today under the name Tribune Content Agency, and syndicates close to 15 comic strips.

In 2009, Universal Press Syndicate merged with Uclick to form Universal Uclick. In 2011, Universal Uclick acquired United Media (with its divisions United Feature Syndicate and the Newspaper Enterprise Association) to become the largest American press syndicate.

As a result, Universal Uclick became one of the largest print syndicators in the United States, as United Media was one of the company's main competitor in the industry. King Features Syndicate and Creators Syndicate still had extensive operations' at that point, the top five syndicates were King Features, Creators Syndicate, Tribune Media Services, Universal Uclick, and the Washington Post Writers Group (WPWG).

=== Challenging times (2005–present) ===
Syndicates responded in different ways to the rise of digital content — Uclick launched its digital distribution portal, GoComics, in 2005; and King Features launched its Comics Kingdom in 2008; while other syndicates did not embrace digital distribution so warmly. Among other things, the syndicates' digital portals allowed them to continue selling strips that had ended or no longer ran in print.

A 2015 article in the trade magazine Editor & Publisher highlighted the challenges facing comic strip syndication, which included the rise of digital content and declining readership in print newspapers. Whereas syndicates had formerly launched three or more strips each year, it was now common to introduce as few as one new strip per year.

In late 2016, the top-selling syndicates were Universal Uclick and King Features, with 80 and 62 active strips, respectively.

In January 2017, Universal Uclick became known as Andrews McMeel Syndication. As of 2017, the leading strip syndicates were Andrews McMeel, King Features, and Creators Syndicate, with the Tribune Content Agency and the Washington Post Writers Group still active but declining.

In early 2022, The Washington Post Writers Group announced it would wind down its comic strips and editorial cartoons business announcing it would finish out any existing contracts. In response, a number of strips left for other syndicates (mostly to Andrews McMeel). In addition, a group of WPWG editorial cartoonists — including Clay Bennett, Jack Ohman, and Pedro X. Molina — left for Nick Anderson's Counterpoint Media, which launched its own syndication service. In September 2022, Counterpoint began syndicating comic strips, first taking on Darrin Bell's Rudy Park and then Gene Weingarten, Dan Weingarten, and David Clark's Barney & Clyde, both of which were formerly distributed by WPWG.

== Visual timeline ==
A visual timeline of notable comic strip syndicates from 1900–present:

== See also ==
- List of comic strip syndicates
