= Famous Funnies =

American comic strip anthology

- Famous Funnies #1 (July 1934). Cover art by Jon Mayes, featuring Mutt and Jeff, Hairbreadth Harry, Nipper, Tailspin Tommy, and other popular comic strip characters from the period.

Publication information
- Publisher: Eastern Color Printing
- Schedule: Monthly, then bimonthly
- Format: Ongoing series
- Publication date: July 1934 – July 1955
- No. of issues: 218 (#1–218) (Note: Not including Famous Funnies: A Carnival of Comics (1933) and Famous Funnies: Series 1 (1934))
- Main character(s): Buck Rogers, Somebody's Stenog, Jane Arden, Oaky Doaks, Keeping Up with the Joneses, Mickey Finn, Invisible Scarlet O'Neil, Connie Roy Powers, War on Crime

Creative team
- Artist(s): Victor E. Pazmiño, A. E. Hayward, Frank Godwin, F. O. Alexander, Clare Victor Dwiggins, Ralph Fuller, Lank Leonard

Famous Funnies is an American comic strip anthology series published from 1934 to 1955 with two precursor one-shots appearing in 1933–1934. Published by Eastern Color Printing, Famous Funnies is considered by popular culture historians as the first true American comic book, following seminal precursors.

== Publication history ==
=== Precursors ===
==== The Funnies and Funnies on Parade ====
The creation of the modern American comic book came in stages. Dell Publishing in 1929 published a 16-page, newsprint periodical of comic strip-styled material titled The Funnies and described by the Library of Congress as "a short-lived newspaper tabloid insert". This is not to be confused with Dell's later same-name comic book, which began publication in 1936. Historian Ron Goulart describes the four-color, newsstand periodical as "more a Sunday comic section without the rest of the newspaper than a true comic book".

It was followed in 1933 by Eastern Color Printing's Funnies on Parade, a similarly newsprint tabloid but only eight pages and composed of several comic strips licensed from the McNaught Syndicate, the Ledger Syndicate, Associated Newspapers, and the Bell Syndicate, and reprinted in color. Neither sold nor available on newsstands, it was sent free as a promotional item to consumers who mailed in coupons clipped from Procter & Gamble soap and toiletries products. Other sponsoring corporations utilizing the comic as a giveaway included Kinney Shoes and Canada Dry beverages.

==== Famous Funnies: A Carnival of Comics and Famous Funnies: Series 1 ====
Famous Funnies: A Carnival of Comics (1933), the first precursor to the series

Famous Funnies: Series 1 (1934), the second precursor to the series

That same year (1933), Eastern Color salesperson Maxwell Gaines and sales manager Harry I. Wildenberg collaborated with Dell Publishing to publish the 36-page one-shot Famous Funnies: A Carnival of Comics, considered by historians the first true American comic book; Goulart, for example, calls it "the cornerstone for one of the most lucrative branches of magazine publishing". It was distributed through the Woolworth's department store chain, though it is unclear whether it was sold or given away; the cover displays no price, but Goulart refers, either metaphorically or literally, to Gaines "sticking a ten-cent pricetag [sic] on the comic books".

A Carnival of Comics featured such popular syndicated comic strips as The Bungle Family, Dixie Dugan, Joe Palooka, Keeping Up with the Joneses, Mutt and Jeff, Reg'lar Fellers, and Somebody's Stenog, as well as many more. Creators included F. O. Alexander, Gene Byrnes, Al Capp, Wallace Carlson, Clare Victor Dwiggins, Frank Godwin, A. E. Hayward, Sol Hess, J. P. McEvoy, C. M. Payne, Al Smith, John H. Striebel, and Harry J. Tuthill.

In early 1934, Eastern Color Printing president George Janosik formed a 50/50 joint venture with Dell president George Delacorte to publish and market a comic book for retail sales. As a test to see if the public would be willing to pay for comic books, Dell published the single-issue Famous Funnies: Series 1, also printed by Eastern Color. Unlike its predecessor, it was intended from the start to be sold rather than given away. A 68-page collection of comic strips previously published in Funnies on Parade and Famous Funnies: A Carnival of Comics, this 10¢ periodical had a print run of 35,000 and sold successfully.

With the outbreak of World War II, the publishing industry participated in national drives to conserve paper. As a conservation measure, syndicates reduced the size of full-page Sunday comic strips to three-quarters or half the size of the newspaper page. As a result of this size reduction, newspaper strips were no longer suitable for further reduction in the comic book format, and Eastern was forced to commission new work rather than reprint material. Famous Funnies #88 (cover-dated November 1941) carried the last sets of reprint material from the full-size newspaper page. Beginning with the following issue, Eastern Color Printing started to commission new work for their comic book publications. Many features from the original Famous Funnies format were continued by the same artists. These artists now turned their strips into dual features – one for newspaper syndication with an emphasis on adult appeal, and the other to fit the new comic book page size and an emphasis on juvenile appeal.

=== Famous Funnies ongoing series ===
After the previous successes, Eastern employee Harold Moore proposed a monthly comic book series. When Dell nonetheless declined to continue, Eastern Color on its own published Famous Funnies #1 (cover-dated July 1934), also a 68-page periodical selling for 10¢. Distributed to newsstands by the mammoth American News Company, it proved a hit with readers during the cash-strapped Great Depression, selling 90 percent of its 200,000 print run; however, its costs left Eastern Color more than $4,000 in debt (prompting George Delacorte to sell his interest back to Eastern). That situation quickly changed, with the book turning a $30,000 profit each issue starting with issue #12.

The success of Famous Funnies soon led to the title being sold on newsstands alongside slicker magazines. Eastern began to experiment with modifying the newspaper reprints to be more suitable to the comic book format. Lettering, reduced in reproduction to the point of illegibility, was reworked for the size of the comic book page. Adventure strips, reprinted in several weeks' worth of strips at a time, were trimmed of panels providing a recap of previous events, contributing to a concise and more smoothly flowing version of the story. Famous Funnies would eventually run 218 issues, inspire imitators, and largely launch a new mass medium.

== Ongoing features ==
The Ledger Syndicate provided many strips for Famous Funnies issues #1–87 (from 1934 to 1941), including A. E. Hayward's Somebody's Stenog and The Back-Seat Driver; Frank Godwin's Connie, The Wet Blanket, Babe Bunting, Roy Powers, Vignettes of Life, and War on Crime; F. O. Alexander's Hairbreadth Harry and High-Gear Homer; Clare Victor Dwiggins' Footprints on the Sands of Time; Joe Bowers' Dizzy Dramas; Gar (Schmitt)'s Dumb-Bells; and Walt Munson & Kemp Starrett's Such is Life.

Issue #2 marked the start of original material produced specifically for the book, including Art Nugent's Funland (occasionally called Funland Everybody's Playmate), which appeared in most issues from #1 to #162 (1934–1948). Issue #3 began a run of Buck Rogers features. Buck Rogers would eventually run in issues #3–190 and 209–215.

Jane Arden was a regular feature in issues #2–35. The Pop Momand features Keeping Up with the Joneses and Holly of Hollywood were featured in issues #3–48.

For several years Victor E. Pazmiño drew most of the covers for Famous Funnies. Oaky Doaks was featured often on the covers of the title, which also reprinted the strip.

In May 1936, Federal Bureau of Investigation director J. Edgar Hoover contacted cartoonist Rex Collier and proposed a comic strip based on true stories of FBI agents. Collier’s strip, War on Crime, is reprinted in the October issue (#27) of Famous Funnies — the first "true crime" story in comic books.

Stookie Allen contributed the feature Above the Crowd to Famous Funnies from 1935 to 1943, in most issues from #11 to #109. Lank Leonard's Mickey Finn was featured in issues #28–35.

Famous Funnies #32 featured the first appearance of the Phantom Magician as a supporting character in the feature The Adventures of Patsy. The Phantom Magician was an early costumed hero pre-dating Superman.

Famous Funnies #38 began reprints of the Ledger Syndicate strip Eagle Scout Roy Powers. Penned by artist Paul Powell, himself a former Boy Scout, this strip became the official symbol of the Boy Scouts of America and was instrumental in the promotion of its Eagle Scout rank. Roy Powers ran as a regular feature in Famous Funnies for ten years.

Famous Funnies #62 featured early work by artist Jack Kirby under the pen name Lance Kirby.

Inspired by the popular trend of superheroes, Famous Funnies #81 introduced Invisible Scarlet O'Neil, one of comics’ earliest super-heroines, authored by Russell Stamm. This issue marked a change in mood for Famous Funnies, as the covers switched from whimsical gags to more serious adventurous fare.

Buck Rogers returned to Famous Funnies in issue #209, having been dropped from the title two issues earlier. The event was celebrated by the first of a series of eight covers by Frank Frazetta, and these issues are among the most sought-after among collectors today.

== See also ==
- More Fun Comics
