= Funnies on Parade =

American publication of 1933

- Cover of Funnies on Parade (1933)

Publication information
- Publisher: Eastern Color Printing
- Format: Color newsprint magazine
- Publication date: Spring 1933
- No. of issues: 1
- Main character(s): Blackstone Magic, The Bungle Family, Cicero, Fisher's Silly Scoops, Fisher's True Life Dramas, Hairbreadth Harry, High-Gear Homer, Holly of Hollywood, Joe Palooka, Keeping Up with the Joneses, Mutt and Jeff, Nipper, Reg'lar Fellers, S'Matter, Pop?, Somebody's Stenog, Strange As It Seems

Creative team
- Artist(s): F. O. Alexander, Gene Byrnes, Al Capp, Clare Victor Dwiggins, A. E. Hayward, John Hix, Pop Momand, C. M. Payne, Al Smith, Harry J. Tuthill

Funnies on Parade is an American giveaway publication of 1933 that was a precursor of comic books. The eight-page publication featured reprints of such popular syndicated comic strips as The Bungle Family, Joe Palooka, Keeping Up with the Joneses, Mutt and Jeff, Reg'lar Fellers, and Somebody's Stenog. Creators included F. O. Alexander, Gene Byrnes, Al Capp, Clare Victor Dwiggins, A. E. Hayward, C. M. Payne, Al Smith, and Harry J. Tuthill.

== History ==
=== Precursor: The Funnies ===
The creation of the modern American comic book came in stages. Dell Publishing in 1929 published a 16-page, newsprint periodical of original, comic strip-styled material titled The Funnies and described by the Library of Congress as "a short-lived newspaper tabloid insert". (This is not to be confused with Dell's later same-name comic book, which began publication in 1936.) Comics historian Ron Goulart describes the four-color, newsstand periodical as "more a Sunday comic section without the rest of the newspaper than a true comic book".

=== Funnies on Parade ===
In early 1933, Eastern Color began producing small comic broadsides for the Ledger Syndicate of Philadelphia, printing Sunday color comics from 7 in × 9 in (180 mm × 230 mm) plates. Eastern Color sales manager Harry I. Wildenberg and his coworkers – salesperson Maxwell Gaines and owner George Janosik – realized that two such plates would fit on a tabloid-sized page.

Soon after, in April 1933, Wildenberg created the first modern-format comic book when, according to legend, he folded a newspaper into halves and then into quarters and, finding that a convenient book size, led him to have to Eastern Color publish Funnies on Parade. Like The Funnies but 32 pages, this, too, was a newsprint magazine. Rather than using original material, however, it reprinted in color several comic strips licensed from the McNaught Syndicate, the Ledger Syndicate, and the Bell-McClure Syndicate. This periodical, however, was neither sold nor available on newsstands, but rather sent free as a promotional item to consumers who mailed in coupons clipped from Procter & Gamble soap and toiletries products. Ten-thousand copies were made. The promotion proved a success, and Eastern Color that year produced similar periodicals for Canada Dry soft drinks, Kinney Shoes, Wheatena cereal and others, with print runs of from 100,000 to 250,000.

In addition to Gaines, those associated with the project included Leverett Gleason other future industry notables working under Wildenberg's supervision.

Later in 1933, Gaines collaborated with Dell Publishing once again to publish the 36-page one-shot Famous Funnies: A Carnival of Comics, followed in 1934 by Famous Funnies, which ran for 218 issues and is considered the first true American comic book.

== See also ==
- More Fun Comics
