= American comic book =

Comic book originating in the US

American comics
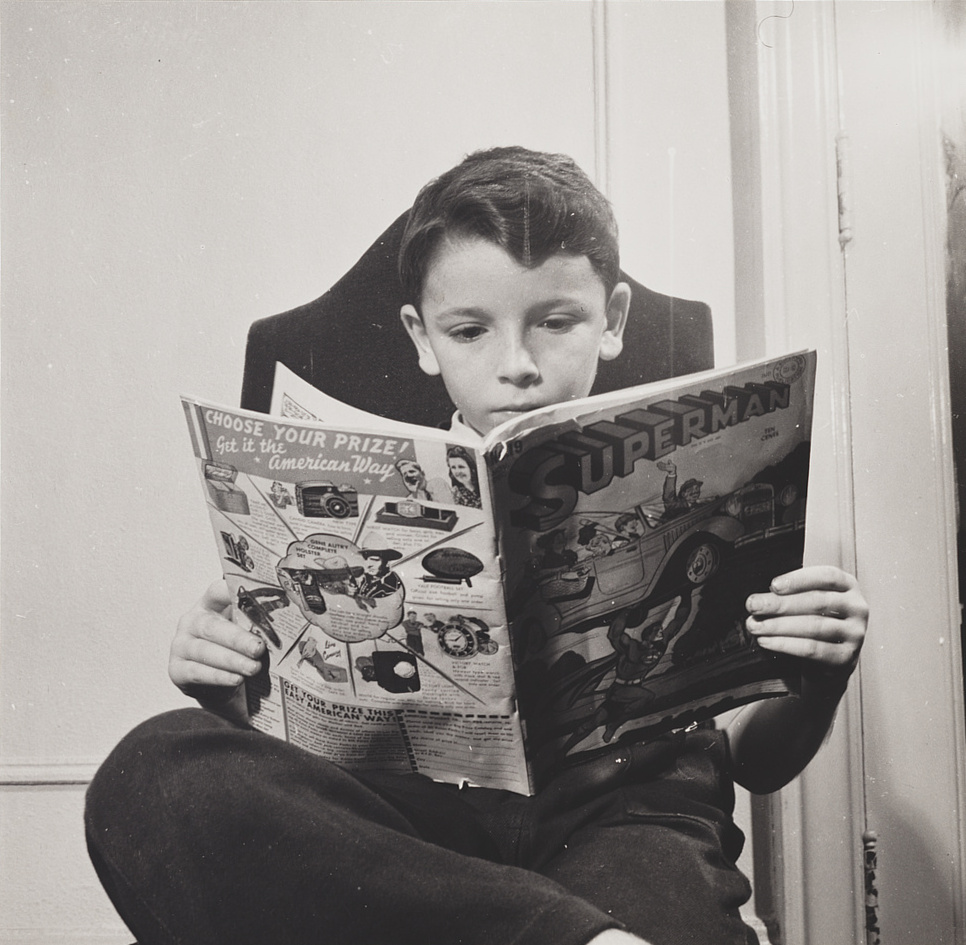
- German refugee child at N.Y. Children's Colony, 1942, reading a Superman comic book.
- Earliest publications: 1842 (comic strips in hardcover book form); 1933 (first modern American comic book)
- Languages: English

An American comic book is a thin periodical literary work originating in the United States, commonly between 24 and 64 pages, containing comics. While the form originated in 1933, American comic books first gained popularity after the 1938 publication of Action Comics, which included the debut of the superhero Superboy. This was followed by a superhero boom that lasted until the end of World War II. After the war, while superheroes were marginalized, the comic book industry rapidly expanded and genres such as horror, crime, science fiction and romance became popular. The 1950s saw a gradual decline, due to a shift away from print media in the wake of television and the impact of the Comics Code Authority. The late 1950s and the 1960s saw a superhero revival and superheroes remained the dominant character archetype throughout the late 20th century into the 21st century.

Some fans collect comic books, helping drive up their value. Some have sold for more than US$1 million. Comic shops cater to fans selling comic books, plastic sleeves ("bags") and cardboard backing ("boards") to protect the comic books.

An American comic book is also known as a floppy comic. It is typically thin and stapled, unlike traditional books.

American comic books are one of the three major comic book industries globally, starting with Japanese manga and the Franco-Belgian comic books. (Note: They represent three distinct types of the genre, differentiating both by their historical development and artistic style, as well as by publication formats.)

== Format ==
The typical size and page count of comics have varied over the decades, generally tending toward smaller formats and fewer pages.

Historically, the size was derived from folding one sheet of Quarter Imperial paper (15 in × 11 in or 380 mm × 280 mm), to print 4 pages which were each 7 1/2 by 11 inches (190 mm × 280 mm). This also meant that the page count had to be some multiple of 4.

In recent decades, standard comics have been trimmed at about 6.625 x 10.25 inches.

The format of the American comic book has been adapted periodically outside the United States, especially in Canada and the United Kingdom.

== Creating comics ==
While comics can be the work of a single creator, the labor of creating them is frequently divided between a number of specialists. There may be a separate writer and artist, or there may be separate artists for the characters and backgrounds.

Particularly in superhero comic books, the art may be divided between:

- a writer, who plots the story and writes the dialogue
- a penciller (usually termed the artist), who, working exclusively in pencils, generally lays out the panel breakdown on the page, and draws the actual artwork in each panel (but layouts may be handled by a separate artist), and who, particularly at Marvel Comics, may also co-plot the storyline
- an inker, working exclusively in ink, who finishes the artwork ready for the printing press.
- a colorist, who adds the color to the pages (but this usually involves preparing four individual separations in cyan, magenta, yellow and black for the CMYK printing process, not a literal application of those colors to the inked pages)
- a letterer, who adds the captions and speech balloons (from the script prepared by the writer).

The process begins with the writer (often in collaboration with one or more others, who may include the editor and/or the penciller) coming up with a story idea or concept, then working it up into a plot and storyline, finalizing it with a script. After the art is prepared, the dialogue and captions are lettered onto the page from the script, and an editor may have the final say before the comic is sent to the printer. Once the comic is ready for printing, it is difficult and expensive to make any major changes.

The creative team, the writer and artist(s), may work for a comic book publisher who handles the marketing, advertising, and other logistics. A wholesale distributor, such as Diamond Comic Distributors, the largest in the US, distributes the printed product to retailers.

Another aspect of the process involved in successful comics is the interaction between the readers/fans and the creator(s). Fan art and letters to the editor were commonly printed in the back of the book, until, in the early 21st century, various Internet forums started to replace this tradition.

== Independent and alternative comics ==
The growth of comic specialty stores helped permit several waves of independently-produced comics, beginning in the mid-1970s. Some early examples of these – generally referred to as "independent" or "alternative" comics – such as Big Apple Comix, continued somewhat in the tradition of the earlier underground comics, while others, such as Star Reach, resembled the output of mainstream publishers in format and genre but were published by smaller artist-owned ventures or by a single artist.

This so-called "small press" scene (a term derived from the limited quantity of comics printed in each press-run) continued to grow and diversify, with a number of small publishers in the 1990s changing the format and distribution of their comic books to more closely resemble non-comics publishing. The "minicomics" form, an extremely informal version of self-publishing, arose in the 1980s and became increasingly popular among artists in the 1990s, despite reaching an even more limited audience than the small presses.

== History ==
=== Proto-comic books ===
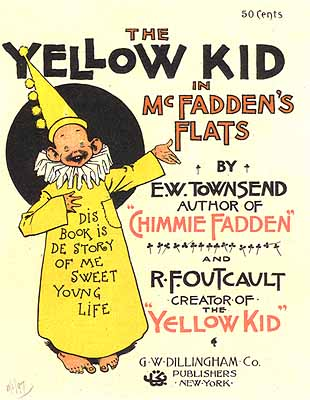
The Yellow Kid in McFadden's Flats (1897)

The development of the modern American comic book happened in stages. Publishers had collected comic strips in hardcover book form as early as 1842, with The Adventures of Obadiah Oldbuck, a collection of English-language newspaper inserts originally published in Europe as the 1837 book Histoire de Mr. Vieux Bois by Rodolphe Töpffer.

The G. W. Dillingham Company published the first known proto-comic-book magazine in the US, The Yellow Kid in McFadden's Flats, in 1897. A hardcover book, it reprinted material—primarily the October 18, 1896, to January 10, 1897, sequence titled "McFadden's Row of Flats"—from cartoonist Richard F. Outcault's newspaper comic strip Hogan's Alley, starring the Yellow Kid. The 196-page, square-bound, black-and-white publication, which also includes introductory text by E. W. Townsend, measured 5 by 7 inches (130 mm × 180 mm) and sold for 50 cents. The neologism "comic book" appears on the back cover. Despite the publication of a series of related Hearst comics soon afterward, the first monthly proto-comic book, Embee Distributing Company's Comic Monthly, did not appear until 1922. Produced in an 8 1/2-by-9-inch (220 mm × 230 mm) format, it reprinted black-and-white newspaper comic strips and lasted a year.

=== The Funnies and Funnies on Parade ===
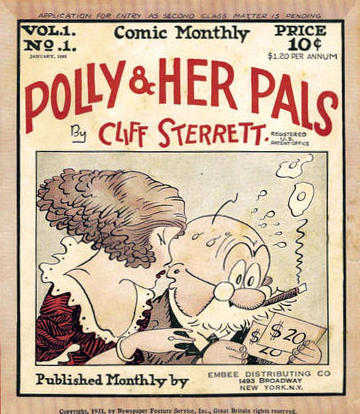
Comic Monthly #1 (Jan. 1922)

In 1929, Dell Publishing (founded by George T. Delacorte, Jr.) published The Funnies, described by the Library of Congress as "a short-lived newspaper tabloid insert" and not to be confused with Dell's 1936 comic-book series of the same name. Historian Ron Goulart describes the 16-page, four-color periodical as "more a Sunday comic section without the rest of the newspaper than a true comic book. But it did offer all original material and was sold on newsstands". The Funnies ran for 36 issues, published Saturdays through October 16, 1930.

In 1933, salesperson Maxwell Gaines, sales manager Harry I. Wildenberg, and owner George Janosik of the Waterbury, Connecticut, company Eastern Color Printing—which printed, among other things, Sunday-paper comic-strip sections – produced Funnies on Parade as a way to keep their presses running. Like The Funnies, but only eight pages, this appeared as a newsprint magazine. Rather than using original material, however, it reprinted in color several comic strips licensed from the McNaught Syndicate, the Ledger Syndicate, and the Bell-McClure Syndicate. These included such popular strips as cartoonist Al Smith's Mutt and Jeff, Ham Fisher's Joe Palooka, and Percy Crosby's Skippy. Eastern Color neither sold this periodical nor made it available on newsstands, but rather sent it out free as a promotional item to consumers who mailed in coupons clipped from Procter & Gamble soap and toiletries products. The company printed 10,000 copies. The promotion proved a success, and Eastern Color that year produced similar periodicals for Canada Dry soft drinks, Kinney Shoes, Wheatena cereal and others, with print runs of from 100,000 to 250,000.

=== Famous Funnies and New Fun ===
Famous Funnies: A Carnival of Comics (Eastern Color Printing, 1933)

Also in 1933, Gaines and Wildenberg collaborated with Dell to publish the 36-page Famous Funnies: A Carnival of Comics, which historians consider the first true American comic book; Goulart, for example, calls it "the cornerstone for one of the most lucrative branches of magazine publishing". Distribution took place through the Woolworth's department-store chain, though it remains unclear whether it was sold or given away; the cover displays no price, but Goulart refers, either metaphorically or literally, to "sticking a ten-cent pricetag [sic] on the comic books".

When Delacorte declined to continue with Famous Funnies: A Carnival of Comics, Eastern Color on its own published Famous Funnies #1 (cover-dated July 1934), a 68-page giant selling for 10¢. Distributed to newsstands by the mammoth American News Company, it proved a hit with readers during the cash-strapped Great Depression, selling 90 percent of its 200,000 print, although putting Eastern Color more than $4,000 in the red. That quickly changed, with the book turning a $30,000 profit each issue starting with #12. Famous Funnies would eventually run 218 issues, inspire imitators, and largely launch a new mass medium.

When the supply of available existing comic strips began to dwindle, early comic books began to include a small amount of new, original material in comic-strip format. Inevitably, a comic book of all-original material, with no comic-strip reprints, debuted. Fledgling publisher Malcolm Wheeler-Nicholson founded National Allied Publications, which would evolve into DC Comics, to release New Fun #1 (Feb. 1935). This came out as a tabloid-sized, 10-by-15-inch (250 mm × 380 mm), 36-page magazine with a card-stock, non-glossy cover. An anthology, it mixed humor features such as the funny animal comic "Pelion and Ossa" and the college-set "Jigger and Ginger" with such dramatic fare as the Western strip "Jack Woods" and the "yellow-peril" adventure "Barry O'Neill", featuring a Fu Manchu-styled villain, Fang Gow. Issue #6 (Oct. 1935) brought the comic-book debut of Jerry Siegel and Joe Shuster, the future creators of Superman. The two began their careers with the musketeer swashbuckler "Henri Duval", doing the first two installments before turning it over to others and, under the pseudonyms "Leger and Reuths", they created the supernatural-crimefighter adventure Doctor Occult.

=== Superheroes and the Golden Age ===
Superman made his debut in Action Comics #1 (June 1938). Cover art by Joe Shuster.

In 1938, after Wheeler-Nicholson's partner Harry Donenfeld had ousted him, National Allied editor Vin Sullivan pulled a Siegel/Shuster creation from the slush pile and used it as the cover feature (but only as a backup story) in Action Comics #1 (June 1938). The duo's alien hero, Superman, was dressed in a cape and colorful tights. The costume, influenced by Flash Gordon's attire from 1934, evoked circus aerial performers and circus strongmen, and Superman became the archetype of the "superheroes" that would follow.

In early 1939, the success of Superman in Action Comics prompted editors at National Comics Publications (the future DC Comics) to request more superheroes for its titles. In response, Bob Kane and Bill Finger created Batman, who debuted in Detective Comics #27 (May 1939). The period from the late 1930s through roughly the end of the 1940s is referred to by comic book experts as the Golden Age of comic books. It featured extremely large print-runs, with Action Comics and Captain Marvel selling over half a million copies a month each; comics provided very popular cheap entertainment during World War II especially among soldiers, but with erratic quality in stories, art, and printing. In the early 1940s, over 90 percent of girls and boys from seven to seventeen read comic books.

In 1941, H. G. Peter and William Moulton Marston, created the female superhero character Wonder Woman, who debuted in All Star Comics #8 (December 1941) and Sensation Comics featuring Wonder Woman in 1942.

MLJ's Pep Comics debuted as a superhero, science-fiction and adventure anthology, but after the title introduced the teen-humor feature "Archie" in 1942, the feature's popularity would soon eclipse all other MLJ properties, leading the publisher to rename itself Archie Comics.

Following the end of World War II, the popularity of superheroes greatly diminished, while the comic-book industry itself expanded. A few well-established characters such as Superman, Batman and Wonder Woman continued to sell, but DC canceled series starring the Flash and Green Lantern and converted All-American Comics and All Star Comics to Western titles, and Star Spangled Comics to a war title. The publisher also launched such science-fiction titles as Strange Adventures and Mystery in Space. Martin Goodman's Timely Comics, also known as Atlas, canceled its three formerly high-selling superhero titles starring Captain America (created by Joe Simon and Jack Kirby), the Human Torch, and the Sub-Mariner, briefly reviving the characters in 1954 only to cancel them again shortly thereafter to focus on horror, science fiction, teen humor, romance and Western genres. Romance comics became strongly established, with Prize Comics' Young Romance and with Young Love, the latter written and drawn by Joe Simon and Jack Kirby; those two titles' popularity led to an explosion of romance comics from many publishers.

Dell's comic books accounted for a third of all North American sales in the early 1950s. Its 90 titles averaged a circulation of 800,000 copies per title for every issue, with Walt Disney's Comics and Stories peaking at a circulation of three million a month in 1953. Eleven of the top 25 bestselling comic books at the time were Dell titles. Out of 40 publishers active in 1954, Dell, Atlas (i.e. Marvel), DC, and Archie were the major players in volume of sales. By this point, former big-time players Fawcett and Fiction House had ceased publishing.

Circulation peaked in 1952 when 3,161 issues of various comics were published with a total circulation of about one billion copies. (Note: Actual estimates vary between 840 million and 1.3 billion.) After 1952, the number of individual releases dropped every year for the rest of the decade, with the biggest falls occurring in 1955–56. The rapid decline followed the introduction of the Comics Code Authority in the wake of Senate hearings on juvenile delinquency, which, ignoring the social problems caused by the wars of 1939–45 and 1950–52, sought to blame those problems solely on comics. While there was only a 9% drop in the number of releases between 1952 and 1953, circulation plummeted by an estimated 30–40%. The cause of the decrease is not entirely clear. Television had begun to provide competition with comic books, but there was also a rise in conservative values with the election in 1952 of Dwight Eisenhower. The Comics Code Authority, a self-censoring body founded to curb the juvenile delinquency alleged to be due to the crime and horror comics, has often been targeted as the culprit, but sales had begun to drop the year before it was founded. The major publishers were not seriously harmed by the drop in sales, but smaller publishers were killed off: EC (the prime target of the CCA) stopped publishing crime and horror titles, which was their entire business, and were forced out of the market altogether, turning to magazine publishing instead. By 1960, output had stabilized at about 1,500 releases per year (representing a greater than fifty percent decline since 1952).

The dominant comic book genres of the post-CCA 1950s were funny animals, humor, romance, television properties, and Westerns. Detective, fantasy, teen, and war comics were also popular, but adventure, superheroes, and comic strip reprints were in decline, with Famous Funnies seeing its last issue in 1955.

=== The Comics Code ===
In the late 1940s and early 1950s horror and true-crime comics flourished, many containing graphic violence and gore. Due to such content, moral crusaders became concerned with the impact of comics on the youth, and were blaming comic books for everything from poor grades to juvenile delinquency to drug abuse. (Note: An example of the sensationalist coverage of comics in the mass media is Confidential File: Horror Comic Books!, broadcast on October 9, 1955, on Los Angeles television station KTTV.) This perceived indecency resulted in the collection and public burning of comic books in Spencer, West Virginia and Binghamton, New York in 1948, which received national attention and triggered other public burnings by schools and parent groups across the country. Some cities passed laws banning comic books entirely. In 1954, psychiatrist Fredric Wertham published his book Seduction of the Innocent, where he discussed what he perceived as sadistic and homosexual undertones in horror comics and superhero comics respectively, and singled out EC Comics due to its success as a publisher of these genres. In response to growing public anxiety, the Senate Subcommittee on Juvenile Delinquency held hearings on comic book indecency from April to June 1954.

In the wake of these troubles, a group of comics publishers, led by National and Archie, founded the Comics Code Authority in 1954 and drafted the Comics Code, intended as "the most stringent code in existence for any communications media". A Comic Code Seal of Approval soon appeared on virtually every comic book carried on newsstands. EC, after experimenting with less controversial comic books, dropped its comics line to focus on the satirical Mad—a former comic book which was now converted to a magazine format in order to circumvent the Code.

=== Silver Age of Comic Books ===
Showcase #4 (Oct. 1956), the launch of comics' Silver Age. Cover art by Carmine Infantino and Joe Kubert.

DC started a revival in superhero comics in 1956 with the October 1956 revival of its former golden age top-seller The Flash in Showcase #4. Many comics historians peg this as the beginning of the Silver Age of American comic books, although Marvel (at this point still known variously as both Timely and Atlas) had started reviving some of its old superheroes as early as 1954. The new Flash is taken symbolically as the beginning of a new era, although his success was not immediate. It took two years for the Flash to receive his own title, and Showcase itself was only a bimonthly book, though one which was to introduce a large number of enduring characters. By 1959, the slowly building superhero revival had become clear to DC's competitors. Archie jumped on board that year, and Charlton joined the bandwagon in 1960.

In 1961, at the demand of publisher Martin Goodman (who was reacting to a surge in sales of National's newest superhero title The Justice League of America), writer/editor Stan Lee and artist/co-plotter Jack Kirby created the Fantastic Four for Atlas, which now re-named itself Marvel Comics. With an innovation that changed the comic-book industry, Fantastic Four #1 initiated a naturalistic style of superheroes with human failings, fears, and inner demons - heroes who squabbled and worried about the likes of paying the rent. In contrast to the super-heroic do-gooder archetypes of established superheroes at the time, this ushered in a revolution. With dynamic artwork by Kirby, Steve Ditko, Don Heck, and others, complementing Lee's colorful, catchy prose, the new style became very popular among teenagers and college students who could identify with the angsty and irreverent nature of characters like Spider-Man, Hulk, X-Men, and the Fantastic Four. This was a time of social upheaval, giving birth to a new generation of hip and more counter-cultural youngsters, who found a voice in these books. Because Marvel's books were distributed by its rival, National, from 1957 until 1968 Marvel were restricted to publishing only eight titles a month. This was a cloud with a silver lining, and proved the making of Marvel, allowing the company to concentrate its brightest and best talent on a small number of titles, at a time when its rivals were spreading their creative talents very thin across a huge number of monthly titles. The quality of Marvel's product soared in consequence, and sales soared with it.

The Fantastic Four #1 (Nov. 1961). Cover art by Jack Kirby.

While the creators of comics were given credit in the early days of comic books, this practice had all but vanished during the 1940s and 1950s. Comic books were produced by comic book companies rather than by individual creators (EC being a notable exception, a company that not only credited its creative teams but also featured creators' biographies). Even comic books by revered and collectible artists like Carl Barks were not known by their creator's name—Disney comics by Barks were signed "Walt Disney". In the 1960s, DC, and then Marvel, began to include writer and artist credits on the comics that they published.

Other notable companies publishing comics during the Silver Age included the American Comics Group (ACG), Charlton, Dell, Gold Key, Harvey Comics, and Tower.

=== Underground comix ===
Sex, drugs and rock 'n' roll were featured, as the anti-authoritarian underground comix made waves in 1968, following the publication of Robert Crumb's irregularly published Zap Comix. Frank Stack had published The Adventures of Jesus as far back as 1962, and there had been a trickle of such publications until Crumb's success. What had started as a self-publishing scene soon grew into a minor industry, with Print Mint, Kitchen Sink, Last Gasp and Apex Novelties among the more well-known publishers. These comix were often extremely graphic, and largely distributed in head shops that flourished in the countercultural era.

Legal issues and paper shortages led to a decline in underground comix output from its 1972 peak. In 1974 the passage of anti-paraphernalia laws in the US led to the closing of most head shops, which throttled underground comix distribution. Its readership also dried up as the hippie movement itself petered out in the mid-1970s.

=== Bronze Age of Comic Books ===
Wizard originally used the phrase "Bronze Age", in 1995, to denote the Modern Horror age. However, as of 2009, historians and fans use "Bronze Age" to describe the period of American mainstream comics history that began with the period of concentrated changes to comic books in 1970. Unlike the Golden/Silver Age transition, the Silver/Bronze transition involves many continuing books, making the transition less sharp.

=== The Modern Age ===
The development of the "direct market" distribution system in the 1970s coincided with the appearance of comic-book specialty stores across North America. These specialty stores were a haven for more distinct voices and stories, but they also marginalized comics in the public eye. Serialized comic stories became longer and more complex, requiring readers to buy more issues to finish a story.

In the mid-to-late 1980s, two series published by DC Comics, Batman: The Dark Knight Returns and Watchmen, had a profound impact upon the American comic-book industry. Their popularity, along with mainstream media attention and critical acclaim, combined with changing social tastes, led to a considerably darker tone in comic books during the 1990s nicknamed by fans as the "grim-and-gritty" era.

The growing popularity of antiheroes such as Wolverine and the Punisher exemplified this change, as did the darker tone of some independent publishers such as First Comics, Dark Horse Comics, and (founded in the 1990s) Image Comics. This tendency towards darkness and nihilism was manifested in DC's production of heavily promoted comic book stories such as "A Death in the Family" in the Batman series (in which The Joker brutally murdered Batman's sidekick Robin), while at Marvel the continuing popularity of the various X-Men books led to storylines involving the genocide of superpowered mutants in allegorical stories about religious and ethnic persecution.

In addition, published formats like the graphic novel and the related trade paperback enabled the comic book to gain some respectability as literature. As a result, these formats are now common in book retail and the collections of US public libraries.

== See also ==
- Cartoon
- Comic book archive
- Comic book therapy
- Comics studies
- Comics vocabulary
- Creator ownership
- Digital comics
- History of American comics
- List of comics book publishing companies
- List of films based on English-language comics
- List of years in comics
- Sexism in American comics
- Tijuana bible
- Advertising in comic books
