= Jingle Jangle Comics =

Comic book series

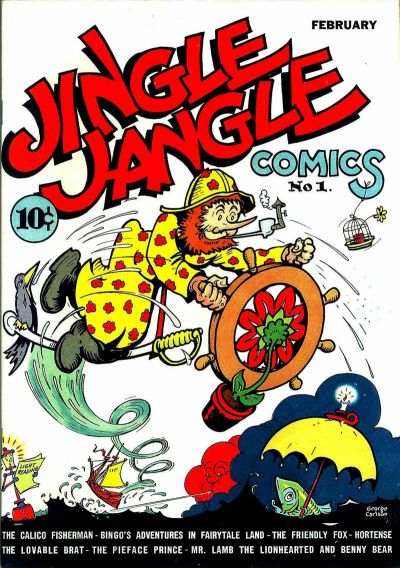
- First issue cover, February 1942

Publication information
- Publisher: Eastern Color under the Famous Funnies, Inc. imprint
- Schedule: Bimonthly
- Format: Color; Newsprint
- Publication date: February 1942 – December 1949
- No. of issues: 42

Creative team
- Created by: Steven Douglas (editor); George L. Carlson (principal artist)

Jingle Jangle Comics was a ten-cent, bimonthly, 42-issue, 68-page (later reduced to 52-page) children's-oriented American comic book magazine published by Eastern Color under the Famous Funnies, Inc. imprint between February 1942 and December 1949. The series featured mixes of human and cartoon animal material. The series was edited by Steven Douglas with George L. Carlson as principal artist. Additional stories were drawn by David Tendlar.

Noted critic and science-fiction writer Harlan Ellison penned an ode to Carlson and Jingle Jangle in an essay called "Comic of the Absurd", published in the 1970 collection All in Color for a Dime. Ellison wrote,

"Who is George Carlson? I'm glad you asked. It's about time someone did. George Carlson is Samuel Beckett in a clever plastic disguise. He is Harold Pinter scrubbed clean of the adolescent fear and obscurity, decked out in popcorn balls and confetti. He is Genet without hangups. He is Pirandello buttered with dream-dust and wearing water wings. He is Santa Claus and Peter Pan and the Great Pumpkin and the Genie in the Jug and what Walt Disney started out to be and never quite made... [Carlson] was one of the first cartoonists of the absurd, and a) how he came to develop his style in a time when cuddly animals were the going thing, b) a publishing house like Famous Funnies that trafficked in cuddly animals employed him, and c) kids like myself who really couldn't have understood what he was about, dug him... are improbabilities too staggering to deal with."

== Sources ==
- Goulart, Ron (2001). Great American Comic Books. Publications International Ltd. pp. 152–5.
- "Jingle Jangle Comics". Grand Comics Database.
