= Batman with Robin the Boy Wonder =

Batman with Robin the Boy Wonder may refer to:

- Batman (comic strip), also known as Batman with Robin the Boy Wonder, an American comic strip
- The Adventures of Batman, also known as Batman with Robin the Boy Wonder, an American animated television series

== See also ==
- All Star Batman & Robin, the Boy Wonder, American comic book ongoing series
