= Victor E. Pazmiño =

American cartoonist

- Born: Víctor Estenio Pazmiño; June 24, 1899 Guayaquil, Ecuador
- Died: June 6, 1970 (aged 70) Brooklyn, New York, U.S.
- Areas: Cartoonist, Writer, Artist
- Pseudonyms: VEP; Glen Wood
- Notable works: The Funnies; Famous Funnies

Victor Estenio Pazmiño (June 24, 1899 – June 6, 1970) was a cartoonist who was one of the earliest American comic book artists. He drew most of the covers for the seminal comics publication The Funnies (Dell Publishing), and followed that some years later by doing the same thing for early issues of the pioneering true comic book series Famous Funnies (Eastern Color Printing).

== Biography ==
Born in Ecuador, Pazmiño was brought to America as an infant and educated in Brooklyn at Erasmus Hall High School, where he was art editor of The Erasmian, and at Pratt Institute. By the mid-1920s he was producing syndicated newspaper strips including Frolicky Fables (with Wesley Morse) (the Premier Syndicate) and The Figgers Family (Central Press Association).

Starting in the late 1920s his work appeared regularly in American comic books, including The Funnies, Famous Funnies, Keen Detective Funnies, Daredevil Comics, Black Terror, Fighting Yank, Barnyard Comics, and Whiz Comics, usually signed with his initials, VEP. He also contributed gag cartoons to Ballyhoo.

Pazmiño never married or had any children. He died in Brooklyn, New York, in 1970, at age 70.
