= Ledger Syndicate =

Defunct American print syndication service

- Formerly: Public Ledger Syndicate
- Company type: Subsidiary
- Industry: Print syndication
- Founded: 1915; 111 years ago
- Founder: Cyrus H. K. Curtis
- Defunct: c. 1950; 76 years ago
- Headquarters: Independence Square, Philadelphia, Pennsylvania, United States
- Key people: George Fairchild Kearney
- Products: Comic strips, newspaper columns, editorial cartoons
- Owner: Public Ledger (Philadelphia)

The Public Ledger Syndicate (known simply as the Ledger Syndicate) was a syndication company operated by the Philadelphia Public Ledger that was in business from 1915 to circa 1950 (outlasting the newspaper itself, which ceased publishing in 1942). The Ledger Syndicate distributed comic strips, panels, and columns to the United States and the United Kingdom, Ireland, Canada, Sweden, New Zealand, and Australia. The syndicate also distributed material from the Curtis Publishing Company's (the Public Ledger's corporate parent) other publications, including The Saturday Evening Post, Ladies' Home Journal, and The Country Gentleman.

From 1933 to 1941, the Ledger Syndicate was a key contributor to the burgeoning comic book industry, with many of the company's strips published in both the seminal Funnies on Parade, and what popular culture historians consider the first true American comic book, Famous Funnies.

For whatever reason, the Ledger Syndicate favored comic strips with alliterative titles, including Babe Bunting, Daffy Demonstrations, Deb Days, Dizzy Dramas, Hairbreadth Harry, Modish Mitzi, and Somebody's Stenog.

== History ==
The Public Ledger Syndicate was founded in 1915 by Public Ledger publisher Cyrus H. K. Curtis, The first big comic strip success was A. E. Hayward's Somebody's Stenog, launched in late 1918.

The Syndicate was particularly active in the 1920s, when it launched a number of comic strips, including such long-running titles as Connie, Dizzy Dramas, Dumb-Bells, Hairbreadth Harry, and Modish Mitzi.

In 1933, just as the concept of "comic books" was getting off the ground, Eastern Color Printing began producing small comic broadsides for the Ledger Syndicate, printing Sunday color comics from 7 in × 9 in (180 mm × 230 mm) plates. Eastern Color sales manager Harry I. Wildenberg and his coworkers realized that two such plates would fit on a tabloid-sized page; later that year, Wildenberg created the first modern-format comic book when idly folding a newspaper into halves and then into quarters, finding that a convenient book size. Shortly thereafter, Eastern Color published Funnies on Parade, which reprinted in color several comic strips licensed from the Ledger Syndicate, the McNaught Syndicate, Associated Newspapers, and the Bell Syndicate, including the Ledger Syndicate strips Hairbreadth Harry, Nipper, High-Gear Homer, and Somebody's Stenog. Eastern Color neither sold this periodical nor made it available on newsstands, but rather sent it out free as a promotional item to consumers who mailed in coupons clipped from Procter & Gamble soap and toiletries products. The company printed 10,000 copies, and it was a great success.

Following that success, the Ledger Syndicate became a regular source of material for Eastern Color's ongoing anthology series Famous Funnies. The Ledger Syndicate provided strips for Famous Funnies issues #1–87, from 1934 to 1941, including A. E. Hayward's Somebody's Stenog and The Back-Seat Driver; Frank Godwin's Connie, The Wet Blanket, Babe Bunting, Roy Powers, Vignettes of Life, and War on Crime; F. O. Alexander's Hairbreadth Harry and High-Gear Homer; Clare Victor Dwiggins' Footprints on the Sands of Time; Joe Bowers' Dizzy Dramas; Gar (Schmitt)'s Dumb-Bells; and Walt Munson & Kemp Starrett's Such is Life.

Not so happily, the Ledger Syndicate was one of a number of syndicates in 1936–1937 which rejected Jerry Siegel & Joe Shuster's proposed Superman comic strip.

Walter B. Gibson, creator of The Shadow (which was syndicated by the Ledger Syndicate from 1940 to 1942), was a Ledger Syndicate staff writer. In its later years, the manager of the Ledger Syndicate was George Kearney.

The Public Ledger closed down in 1942 and most of the Ledger Syndicate strips ended that year as well, with the exception of Frank Godwin's Connie, which kept going until 1944. Syndicate manager George Kearney tried writing a strip called Rink Brody, illustrated by H. Draper Williams, but it was not successful, coming to a close in 1946. Around that same time, author Walter B. Gibson put together the Gibson Studio from the art staff remnants of the Ledger Syndicate Studio and the Jack Binder Studio.

The syndicate stayed afloat a few more years on columns and features, finally closing its doors circa 1950.

== Features ==
The Ledger Syndicate favored female columnists. Writers syndicated by the Ledger Syndicate included Dorothy Dix and Anne Mary Lawler. At its height (1940), Dix's column, Dorothy Dix Talks, appeared in 273 papers with an estimated reading audience of 60 million. Alice L. Tildesley wrote on Hollywood and the U.S. film industry in the 1930s. Phyllis Belmont and Carol Bird were also Ledger Syndicate columnists in the 1930s. Boake Carter wrote a widely syndicate column for Ledger beginning in 1937. Magician Joseph Dunninger wrote the Mind Reading cokumn in 1939–1940. Edyth Thornton McLeod wrote the Beauty After Forty column in the 1940s.

The syndicate's most popular/long-running comic strips were A. E. Hayward's Somebody's Stenog; Hairbreadth Harry (by C. W. Kahles and later by F. O. Alexander); Frank Godwin's Connie and Babe Bunting; Joe Bowers' Dizzy Dramas; Clare Victor Dwiggins ("Dwig")'s Footprints on the Sands of Time and Nipper; and Roy Powers, Eagle Scout ("the official strip of the Boy Scouts of America"). Frank Godwin had a number of strips with the Ledger Syndicate, including Rusty Riley, Vignettes of Life, War on Crime, and Roy Powers, Eagle Scout, in addition to Connie and Babe Bunting.

== Ledger Syndicate strips and panels ==
=== Launched 1915–1919 ===
- Padded Cell by A. E. Hayward (1915–1918)
- Somebody's Stenog by A. E. Hayward, Ray Thompson, and Sam Nichols (December 16, 1918 – May 10, 1941)

=== Launched in the 1920s ===
- The Boy Friend by Marge Buell (1925–1926)
- Carrie and Her Car by Wood Cowan (1923–1926)
- Connie by Frank Godwin (1927–1944) — female aviator strip; accompanied by the weekly bottom strip The Wet Blanket also by Godwin
- Daffy Demonstrations by Ray Rohn (1926) — daily panel
- Deb Days by Charles Coll (1927)
- Dizzy Dramas by Joe Bowers (1927–1943)
- Doc by Hy Gage (1925) — daily panel
- Dumb-Bells by Joe Cunningham (1924–1925) and Gar (Schmitt) (1925-1935, 1937-1939)
- Hairbreadth Harry by C. W. Kahles and F. O. Alexander (1923–1940) — originated with The Philadelphia Press Syndicate and then the McClure Syndicate
- Lady Bountiful by Gene Carr (1926–1929)
- Miss Information by Hy Gage (1924–1930) — formerly by Wood Cowan for the George Matthew Adams Service
- Modish Mitzi by Jay V. Jay (c. 1923–c. 1938)
- Rufus M'Goofus by Joe Cunningham (1922–1924)
- Sonnysayings by Fanny Cory (c. 1920–1935) — moved to King Features
- Such is Life by Walt Munson and Kemp Starrett (1928–1938)
- Vignettes of Life by Frank Godwin (1924–1927) and J. Norman Lynd (1927–1939)

=== Launched in the 1930s ===
- Babe Bunting by Roy L. Williams and Frank Godwin (1930–1939)
- Effie Spunk by F. O. Alexander (1935)
- Footprints on the Sands of Time by Dwig (1931–1937) — taken over from the McClure Newspaper Syndicate, which ran it in 1929
- High-Gear Homer by F. O. Alexander (November 8, 1931–July 30, 1939) — weekly topper strip to Alexander's Hairbreadth Harry
- Jack Swift by Cliff Farrell and Hal Colson (August 28, 1930–?)
- Nip and Tuck by Bess Goe Willis (1936-1939)
- Nipper by Dwig (1931–1937)
- Roy Powers, Eagle Scout (c. 1937–1942) by "Paul Powell," Jimmy Thompson (c. 1937), Kemp Starrett (1937–1938), Frank Godwin (1938–1940), and Charles Coll (c. 1940)
- Sillyettes (c. 1941)
- War on Crime by Frank Godwin (1936–1938) and Jimmy Thompson (1938)

=== Launched in the 1940s (& 1950) ===
- Classic Stories (1950)
- Huckleberry Finn by Dwig (1940–1942)
- It Never Fails by Mo Weiss (1940–1941)
- Maggie McSnoot (1945–1950)
- Rink Brody by George Kearney and H. Draper Williams (1946)
- The Shadow by Walter B. Gibson and Vernon Greene (1940–1942)

== Ledger Syndicate II ==
Ledger Syndicate
- Industry: Print syndication
- Founded: 1966
- Defunct: c. 1973; 53 years ago
- Headquarters: Overseas Press Club Building, New York City, U.S.
- Key people: John W. Higgins
- Products: Comic strips, Columns

A second, unrelated iteration of the Ledger Syndicate operated from 1966 to c. 1973, headquartered in New York City at the Overseas Press Club Building on West 40th Street. The syndicate president was John W. Higgins, and the syndicate distributed strips such as Batman (taking advantage of the popularity of the Batman TV series), a couple of strips by Batman creator Bob Kane, and a revived version of the 1920s Ledger strip Hairbreadth Harry. From 1967 to 1971, the syndicate also distributed Eric Hoffer's column, Reflections (to 214 client papers in early 1968).

=== Ledger Syndicate II strips and panels ===
- The Aristocrats by Bob Kane (1967–1970)
- Batman with Robin the Boy Wonder (1966–1972) by Whitney Ellsworth, E. Nelson Bridwell, Joe Giella, Al Plastino, and Nick Cardy
- Character Clues by Joe Giella (1966–1967)
- The Drimbles by Agoo (1971–1972)
- Hairbreadth Harry by Joseph Petrovich (1967–1972)
- Hector the Director by Rama Braggiotti (1967–1973)
- The Losers by Bob Kane (1966) — daily panel
