= Anne Mary Lawler =

American writer

- Born: 1908; Philadelphia, Pennsylvania, U.S.
- Died: 1980 (aged 71–72)
- Occupations: Poet, writer
- Writing career
- Notable work: Daily syndicated poems (1932–1942)

Anne Mary Lawler (1908–1980) was an Irish American poet and novelist.

== Biography ==
Anne Mary Lawler was born in Philadelphia, 1908. She was a nationally syndicated poet whose daily poems appeared in the Philadelphia Public Ledger newspaper from 1932 until 1942. During this time she wrote over 3,000 poems, most of which were carried in the Philadelphia area and syndicated to other newspapers within the United States and the United Kingdom, Ireland, Canada, New Zealand and Australia. The Ledger Syndicate (an affiliate of the Philadelphia Public Ledger newspaper) coordinated the distribution of Lawler's poetry. During this time she also wrote feature articles for the Public Ledger and in her personal time wrote radio scripts, short stories, and novelettes.

Lawler's most famous poem, "October," first appeared in The American Book of Days by George William Douglas, published by H. W. Wilson Company in 1937. Other Lawler poems within the book introduced the monthly chapters of January, February, April, June, August, and November (as well as October).

In 1938, Theodore Roosevelt and Alice Roosevelt Longworth compiled and selected poetry for their book The Desk Drawer Anthology: Poems for the American People, published by Doubleday. In this book, Lawler's poem "Lines for Insomnia" appeared on page 185.

== Publications ==
- The American Book of Days. By George William Douglas, 1st Edition. Anne Mary Lawler contributed poems opening seven monthly chapters. H. M. Wilson Publishing, NY, NY, 1937.
- The Desk Drawer Anthology: Poems for the American People. Compiled and Selected by Alice Roosevelt Longworth and Theodore Roosevelt. Anne Mary Lawler contributed the poem "Lines for Insomnia" on page 185. Doubleday, Doran and Company, Inc. Garden City, New York, 1938.
- One Hundred Years. Anne Mary Lawler contributed poem "On Such a Day" on page 44. Schneiderith Publishing, Baltimore, Md. 1949.
