= Dink Shannon =

American cartoonist

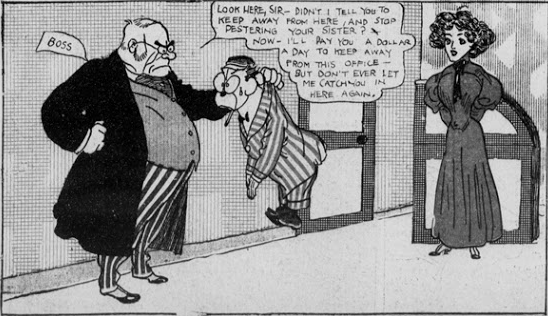
1908 panel from Sallie Snooks, Stenographer

Dink Shannon was an early 20th century American cartoonist.

Shannon's career is only documented for the years 1902 to 1909. He drew a number of strips, including:

- Sammy Small (1904–1906)
- Mister Pest – Book Agent (1905–1906)
- Mooney Miggles and the Magic Cap (1906–1909)
- Sallie Snooks, Stenographer (1907-1908 or 1909)

Sallie Snooks, Stenographer was the first strip to feature a female office worker, preceding Somebody's Stenog, Winnie Winkle, and Tillie the Toiler by more than a decade ("stenographer" was a then-current appellation for a secretary). Sammy Small was a bad-little-boy strip in the mold of The Katzenjammer Kids.

Shannon worked for the World Color Printing syndicate of St. Louis, which distributed a "boiler plate" Sunday section. ("Boiler plates" were pre-printed sections sold mostly to rural papers, with a blank space at the top of the first page for the paper to print its nameplate.) World Color Printing would sometimes assign its cartoonists, who were free-lancers, to previously existing strips, and Shannon also drew the strip Say! Did This Ever Happen To You?, which had been created by C. H. Wellington, in 1905 and 1906. He was succeeded by a person signing as McKee (possibly McKee Barclay).

Shannon's work offers one of the more distinctive visual styles of the early comics with artful distortion that resonates with the work of Lyonel Feininger and the early Expressionists... Dink's art constantly feels on the verge of falling apart and rebuilding into something else – a dreamlike morphing that, in some ways, comes from the same place as Winsor McCay's surreal comics.

— Paul Tumey, The Masters of Screwball Comics
