= Max Gaines =

Pioneer of the modern comic book

- (L to R) William Moulton Marston, H. G. Peter, Sheldon Mayer, and Gaines in 1942
- Born: Max Ginzberg; September 21, 1894 New York City, U.S.
- Died: August 20, 1947 (aged 52) Lake Placid, New York, U.S.
- Area: Publisher

Maxwell Charles Gaines (Note: /ɡeɪnz/) (born Max Ginzberg, (Note: /ˈɡɪnzbɜːrɡ/) September 21, 1894 – August 20, 1947) was an American publisher and a pioneering figure in the creation of the modern comic book.

In 1933, Gaines devised the first four-color, saddle-stitched newsprint pamphlet (Funnies on Parade), a precursor to the color-comics format that became the standard for the American comic book industry. He was co-publisher of All-American Publications, a seminal comic-book company that introduced such enduring fictional characters as Green Lantern, Wonder Woman, and Hawkman. He went on to found Educational Comics, producing the series Picture Stories from the Bible. He authored one of the earliest essays on comic books, a 1942 pamphlet titled Narrative Illustration, The Story of the Comics.

After Gaines' death in 1947, Educational Comics was taken over by his son Bill Gaines, who transformed the company (now known as EC Comics) into a pioneer of horror, science fiction, and satirical comics.

== Early life ==
Max Ginzberg was born in New York City to a Jewish family. Maxwell Charles Gaines was described as a "hard-nosed, pain-wracked, loud aggressive man". At age four, Gaines had leaned out too far from a second story window and fell to the ground, catching his leg on a picket fence. The leg would give him pain and discomfort for the rest of his life, aggravating his disposition. As an adult he developed a vicious temper, and according to his son, William M. Gaines, "expected the worst from his son and was rarely disappointed." Gaines continually reinforced this belief by venting his frustrations on the boy, beating him savagely with a leather belt while shouting, "You'll never amount to anything!".

== Career ==
Gaines had been a teacher, an elementary school principal, a munitions factory worker, and a haberdasher. In 1933 he had begun a new job as a salesperson at Eastern Color Printing, which printed Sunday newspaper comic strips. Deducing that packaging such strips together could create promotional publications, Gaines contacted Harry L. Wildenberg, Eastern's sales manager and his direct superior. The two needed promotional ideas for a client, Procter & Gamble, and suggested to the company a tabloid-sized book of color comic-strip reprints available for five cents and a label or coupon from any Procter & Gamble product. The company, however, rejected the idea. Undaunted, and with Wildenberg's blessing, Gaines produced Funnies on Parade, an eight-page newsprint magazine reprinting several comic strips licensed from the McNaught Syndicate and the McClure Syndicate. These included such popular strips as cartoonist Al Smith's Mutt and Jeff, Ham Fisher's Joe Palooka, and Percy Crosby's Skippy. This periodical, however, was neither sold nor available on newsstands, but rather sent free as a promotional item to consumers who mailed in coupons clipped from Procter & Gamble soap and toiletries products. Ten-thousand copies were made. The promotion proved a success, and Eastern Color that year produced similar periodicals for Canada Dry soft drinks, Kinney Shoes, Wheatena cereal, Phillips' Dental Magnesia, John Wanamaker Department Stores, and others, with print runs of from 100,000 to 250,000.

Later in 1933, Gaines collaborated with Dell Publishing to publish the 36-page one-shot Famous Funnies: A Carnival of Comics, followed in 1934 by Famous Funnies, which ran for 218 issues and is considered the first true American comic book. After he quit Eastern Color, he joined McClure Newspaper Syndicate as company manager, and eventually partnered with Dell Comics to produce three of the comic books The Funnies, Popular Comics and The Comics whereas Dell financed Gaines of its three comic book titles, until Dell became associated with Western Publishing in 1938.

=== All-American Publications ===
In 1938, Gaines and Jack Liebowitz began publishing comics with original material under the name "All-American Publications". At the time, Liebowitz was the co-owner with Harry Donenfeld of National Allied Publications, the precursor company to DC Comics, and Donenfeld financed Gaines' creation of All-American. All-American published several superhero/adventure anthologies such as All-American Comics and Flash Comics, as well as other titles. For a time, All-American and National shared marketing and promotional efforts as well as characters. Several of National's characters (Starman, Doctor Fate, The Spectre) appeared alongside All-American's Green Lantern, Wonder Woman, and Hawkman in that company's successful All Star Comics.

Gaines' relationship with Donenfeld and National waxed and waned over the years. By the early 1940s, the All-American titles were branded separately and no longer featured National-owned characters. In 1944, Donenfeld bought out Gaines and merged National and All-American into a single company.

=== EC Comics ===
Gaines used the proceeds from the sale of All-American to establish another comics line, Educational Comics. EC Comics continued All-American's Picture Stories from the Bible and added new titles such as Picture Stories from American History. Gaines soon expanded the line with humor and talking animal books such as Land of the Lost, Animal Fables, and Ed Wheelan's Fat and Slat. Some of these books carried a slightly revised publisher logo which changed the "Educational" in EC to display the Entertaining Comics insignia.

== Death and legacy ==
On August 20, 1947, at Lake Placid, New York, Gaines, his friend Sam Irwin, and the latter's 8-year-old son William Irwin were aboard a motorboat when it was struck by another boat. Gaines and the elder Irwin died in the accident.

Max Gaines' 25-year-old son, William Gaines, inherited EC and changed the direction of the company.

Although it continued to advertise and sell back issues of the Educational titles, Bill Gaines concentrated on adding new titles to the Entertaining Comics line. He replaced the juvenile humor books with titles pitched to an older audience and strongly influenced by his own love of popular culture. These spanned several genres as he made a transition from romance (Modern Love) and Westerns (Gunslingers) to science fiction (Weird Science), horror (Tales from the Crypt), and satire (Harvey Kurtzman's Mad).

In 1985, Max Gaines was posthumously named as one of the honorees by DC Comics in the company's 50th anniversary publication Fifty Who Made DC Great.

== See also ==
- American comic book
