= Sexism in American comics =

Sexual prejudice or discrimination in American comic book industry

Historically, the English-language comic-book field has been male-dominated. This has led to rampant sexism and the harassment of female fans and creators in the comics industry. This also means that many female characters are victims of sexism in American comics as well.

== Historical exclusion of women ==
The 1940s and 1950s in America were a time when comic books rose to prominence in the public eye. There was a rise in the type and number of comics being published. Where before, comics had only found homes on the pages of newspapers, and were used as tools to sell papers and attract new readers, by the 40s and 50s, comics were becoming their own medium, independent from the papers, and being featured in their own magazines and comic books. According to David Hajdu:

By 1952, more than twenty publishers were producing nearly 650 comics titles per month, employing well over a thousand artists, writers, editors, letterers, and others—among them women, as well as untold members of racial, ethnic, and social minorities who turned to comics because they thought of themselves or their ideas as unwelcome in more reputable spheres of publishing and entertainment.

According to Trina Robbins, many girls and young women were reading comics at that time:

In one year—1948–1949—romance comic titles jumped from four to 125, more than one quarter of comic books published were romance comics. This was the same year that a graph in Newsdealer magazine showed that females age seventeen to twenty-five were reading more comic books than guys.

It is clear that many girls were engaging with the medium by reading romance comics, but writer Suzanne Scott warns in her 2013 essay Fangirls in refrigerators: The politics of (in)visibility in comic book culture that:

...comics scholarship often essentializes women's taste in comics among gendered genre lines, at the expense of engaging with the (admittedly small but robust) female audience for mainstream comics.

In 1946, the National Cartoonists Society was formed in the United States of America. Women were excluded from the organization. Three years after its formation, the cartoonist Hilda Terry sent the National Cartoonists Society a letter saying:

We must humbly request that you either alter your title to the National Men Cartoonists Society ... or discontinue whatever rule or practice you have which bars otherwise qualified women cartoonists.

She was accepted into the group the following year, and immediately nominated several other female cartoonists for membership. In 1976, Trina Robbins produced Wet Satin, an anthology of erotic comics for women, by women. The printer used by publisher Kitchen Sink Press refused to publish it, denouncing it as pornographic. The same printer had previously published a sex book by all male creators, which according to Robbins had "such an obscene cover it had to be covered with plain white paper before it could even be distributed to the comic book stores".

As Robbins tells it:

The printer insisted that the male sex book, Bizarre Sex, was satire, while Wet Satin was serious and therefore objectionable. Yet the underground sex newspaper Screw, hardly a feminist journal, said in a review, "The humour in Wet Satin is another welcome change from other undergrounds... What might have been a tedious and boring look into the sexual psyche of 'liberated' women turns out to be a series of clever, satirical, and entertaining cartoon strips."

The popular women's comics anthology Wimmen's Comix, which ran for twenty years, ended its run in 1992.

In explaining the reason for its end, editor Caryn Leschen said:

"This book has been printed on cheap paper which will turn yellow in a few years. The print run was too small and all the stores, as usual, will sell out, but they won't reorder because 'Women don't buy comix.' Bullshit. How did they sell out in the first place? It's always like that. What a waste of time and energy. Forget it."

== Modern day gender gap ==
In modern-day American comics, there is still a wide gender gap in the profession. This is evidenced in Tim Haley's ongoing study called 'Gendercrunching' on the website Bleeding Cool. Since 2011, Hanley has looked at the monthly titles published by Marvel Comics and DC Comics, breaking down how many men and women are working on each title. In his August 2014 results, which are typical of the general results, 9.5% of people working on DC's titles were female, and 90.5% were male, as well, 9.8% of the people working on Marvel's titles that month were female and 90.2% were male. In 2011, DC Comics relaunched many of its titles, christening this new beginning The New 52.

While the gender balance in DC's creative teams has never been close to even, as shown in Tim Haley's ongoing "Gendercrunching" study, the number of women working on DC's titles dropped from 12% to 1% with this relaunch. Suzanne Scott recounts the events of the 2011 San Diego Comic-Con where a woman dressed as the comic book character Batgirl, questioned creators and publishers at DC Comics about the company's gender imbalance. The woman dressed as Batgirl, known as Kyrax2, waited in line at panels about the launch of the New 52 and asked questions about which creators and characters would be featured, and commented on the gender imbalance in the material she saw. As Scott notes, Kyrax2 was not the only one asking these questions:

One sound bite that circulated widely featured a male fan posing a similar question, only to be testily challenged and ultimately silenced by DC copublisher Dan Didio.

In an interview with DC Women Kicking Ass, Kyrax2 talked about her experience at San Diego in 2011. Kyrax2 had noticed that the makeup of every panel she had been to at the convention was overwhelmingly male. At the panel, during the question period, she asked the panelists if they were committed to hiring more women. The response that she received from Dan Didio was that he was "committed to hiring the absolute best writers and artists," to which she asked, "Are you saying you can't find any great women writers or artists?" According to Kyrax2, the audience reaction was furious:

People yelled at me to 'sit down!' and shouted out Gail Simone’s name over and over again. I said, "Yes, I met Gail Simone yesterday. I like her very much. But I've attended all these other panels, and with the exception of her and one female editor, they’ve all been male."

In an anonymously authored article from December 2013 on The Comics Journal website, a female writer shares a letter of harassment they received saying:

I don't normally feel like being a woman in this field is enough to justify having to answer questions about it all the time, most frequently: "What is it like to be a woman cartoonist?" Let's face it, this is not dangerous work. This is not even physically demanding. I am not a police officer, I am not a fireman, I am not in the army. I don't put my life on the line every day.

They go on to say:

There are struggles. I would be a fool to deny that. I face the same anxieties as many of my male counterparts, but the difference is that once in a while something kind of gross happens: a weird pass is made, a sexist comment is said, someone checks me out, or some creep corners me at an art opening. Those are the real challenges of being a woman doing ANYTHING.

In a 2014 article on Comics Alliance about why women in comics do not speak up about sexual harassment, Juliet Kahn opens by saying:

I have been a woman in the comics industry for a few months now. It has been wonderful. It has also been terrifying.

She explains that:

When you grow up enveloped in the miasma of "tits or GTFO," "attention whore" and "fake geek girl," fear becomes the price you pay to enjoy your hobbies. You don't even think of it as fear most of the time. Sometimes you join in the fear mongering yourself, enjoying the a**hole glamour of not being too pussy to call another girl a slut. Sometimes you hide in woman-heavy spaces, which go maligned elsewhere ("Tumblrinas!") but do a pretty solid job of keeping you safe. The fear comes back eventually, though, as a slew of graphic rape threats or a simple joke about "feminazis" you are expected to chuckle along with. It might be in response to a screed worthy of Andrea Dworkin—or maybe you just tweeted something about disliking Guardians of the Galaxy. What matters is that you were a woman with an opinion on the internet, and now you must be punished. You must be made to fear.

In her comics column on Comics Alliance, Kate Leth wrote:

If you are a woman in comics people will always be asking you: What's it like being a woman in comics? The question has always bothered me—it's never really mattered. The world of Indie and webcomics has always felt fairly welcoming and balanced. Queer-friendly, too! A few weeks ago, I found myself in the middle of a real old boys club, a first for me. It was...an experience. I spent a weekend trying to ignore the endless supply of sexist, racist, bigoted "jokes" I kept hearing ... If you don't know how to talk to a woman without either bullying or hitting on her, let me ask: what's it like being YOU in comics? 'Cause man, it must suck.

== Sexism in Costumes ==
Many female superheroes are scantily clad. This is because they are primarily dressed to appeal to the male gaze. This means that they tend to be oversexualized. The male superheroes with tight costumes tend to have their muscles accentuated. Their outfits tend to cover their entire body as well. Female superheroes have their chests accentuated, and have lots of skin showing.

For example, Wonder Woman has a tight outfit that is only a leotard. Not only her costume, but in the fact that some people believe that her creator (William Moulston Marston) wrote her weakness as being tied up for his own benefit.

Recently, there have been changes to the outfits. Not just in the comics being released, but in the more recent film adaptations. Examples include Scarlet Witch/Wanda Maximoff (played by Elizabeth Olson) and Wonder Woman/Diana Prince (played by Gal Gadot).

Unfortunately, the female superheroes are not the only ones being placed in sexist costumes. Many female villains are also subject to sexual costume designs. Catwoman in the Batman Comics is usually in a tight, latex suit. Even in the film, Batman Returns, the outfit was not changed when Catwoman was played by Michelle Pfeiffer. Other female villans, such as Poison Ivy, Harley Quinn, and Killer Frost suffer the same fate.
