= Batman (comic strip) =

1943–1991 comic strip in newspapers

- Author: Bob Kane (1943–1946); Walter B. Gibson (1953), William Messner-Loebs (1989–1991)
- Illustrator(s): Carmine Infantino and John Nyberg (1989–1991)
- Current status/schedule: Daily and Sunday; concluded
- Launch date: October 25, 1943
- End date: August 3, 1991
- Alternate name(s): Batman and Robin (1943–1946, 1953); Batman with Robin the Boy Wonder (1966–1972)
- Syndicate(s): McClure Newspaper Syndicate (1943–1946); Ledger Syndicate (1966–1972); Creators Syndicate (1989–1991)
- Genre(s): superhero; adventure

The Batman comic strip began on October 25, 1943, a few years after the creation of the comic book Batman. At first titled Batman and Robin, and briefly lengthened to Batman with Robin the Boy Wonder as a tie-in with the 1966 Batman television series, a later incarnation was ultimately shortened to Batman. The comic strip had three major and two minor runs in American newspapers.

== Batman and Robin (1943–1946) ==
The first series was written by Bob Kane and others. It was published as both a daily strip and a Sunday strip. This series has been reprinted by DC Comics and Kitchen Sink Press in one paperback volume of Sunday strips and three paperback volumes of daily strips. It was distributed by the McClure Syndicate. The strip ended on November 2, 1946.

From Joe Desris's introduction to the first book of daily reprints: "...this newspaper strip, Batman and Robin,...has important historical significance: It is the last large body of work that Batman creator Bob Kane penciled completely solo...and it contains stories by all of the significant writers from the first five, formative years of the feature’s history: Don Cameron, Bill Finger, Jack Schiff and Alvin Schwartz.”

=== Episode guide ===
The Dailies 1943-1943
Title	date	Writer	Pencils	Inking	Lettering	Editor
Introduction		Bill Finger	Bob Kane	Charles Paris	DC bullpen	Jack Schiff
Sentinels of the Law	October 25, 1943 - Monday					
Trained Crime-Fighters!	October 26, 1943 - Tuesday					
Meet Alfred!	October 27, 1943 - Wednesday					
The Bat Signal!	October 28, 1943 - Thursday					
Tha Bat Cave!	October 29, 1943 - Friday					
The Batmobile and the Batplane!	October 30, 1943 - Saturday					
Chapter I: What a Sweet Racket!		Bill Finger	Bob Kane	Charles Paris	DC bullpen	Jack Schiff
Call to Action!	November 1, 1943 - Monday					
Starling News	November 2, 1943 - Tuesday					
Missing: Conviet 56890	November 3, 1943 - Wednesday					
Stymied!	November 4, 1943 - Thursday					
Music Master	November 5, 1943 - Friday					
New Threat!	November 6, 1943 - Saturday					
Forced Exchange!	November 8, 1943 - Monday					
A Sudden Disappearance!	November 9, 1943 - Tuesday					
Uninvited Guest	November 10, 1943 - Wednesday					
The Cat's Meow!	November 11, 1943 - Thursday					
"Cat-Bird" in Action	November 12, 1943 - Friday					
Captive!	November 13, 1943 - Saturday					
Narrow Escape	November 15, 1943 - Monday					
Robin's Funeral?	November 16, 1943 - Tuesday					
A Hot Spot	November 17, 1943 - Wednesday					
Blackie's Plans	November 18, 1943 - Thursday					
Dan Tack's Promise	November 19, 1943 - Friday					
Searching For Robin	November 20, 1943 - Saturday					
Message From Robin	November 22, 1943 - Monday					
A Trap!	November 23, 1943 - Tuesday					
No Surprise	November 24, 1943 - Wednesday					
Noisy Entrance	November 25, 1943 - Thursday					
Hidden Hero	November 26, 1943 - Friday					
Two Down	November 24, 1943 - Saturday					
Batman's Boomerang	November 29, 1943 - Monday					
Slugged By A Sandbag	November 30, 1943 - Tuesday					
Over And Out	December 1, 1943 - Wednesday					
Rude Awakening	December 2, 1943 - Thursday					
Lucky Break?	December 3, 1943 - Friday					
Perfect Pitch	December 4, 1943 - Saturday					
Prisoners	December 6, 1943 - Monday					
Unknown Visitor	December 7, 1943 - Tuesday					
A Tack Attack	December 8, 1943 - Wednesday					
Blackout	December 9, 1943 - Thursday					
Free At Last	December 10, 1943 - Friday					
Captured Convict	December 11, 1943 - Saturday					
Counterfeit Charity	December 13, 1943 - Monday					
Racket Revealed	December 14, 1943 - Tuesday					
What Next!	December 15, 1943 - Wednesday					
Blackie's Pals	December 16, 1943 - Thursday					
Repeat Performance	December 17, 1943 - Friday					
Odd Coincidence	December 18, 1943 - Saturday					
Important Question	December 20, 1943 - Monday					
Strange Behavior	December 21, 1943 - Tuesday					
Back To The Backery	December 22, 1943 - Wednesday					
Hoodwinked Witnesses	December 23, 1943 - Thursday					
Break-In	December 24, 1943 - Friday					
Too Many Dummies	December 25, 1943 - Saturday					
Semi-Pro Crook	December 27, 1943 - Monday					
Blackie Strikes Again!	December 28, 1943 - Tuesday					
Revised Gameplan	December 29, 1943 - Wednesday					
A Hot Tip	December 30, 1943 - Thursday					
New Track-ties	December 31, 1943 - Friday					
Uncoverred Hideout	January 1, 1944 - Saturday					
Another Blackie	January 3, 1944 - Monday					
Bad Disguise?	January 4, 1944 - Tuesday					
Last Chance	January 5, 1944 - Wednesday					
Fake Felon	January 6, 1944 - Thursday					
Quick Thinking	January 7, 1944 - Friday					
Three-In-One	January 8, 1944 - Saturday					
Chapter II: The Phantom Terrorist		Bill Finger	Bob Kane	Charles Paris	DC bullpen	Jack Schiff
Chapter III: The Joker's Syumbol Crimes		Bill Finger	Bob Kane	Charles Paris	DC bullpen	Jack Schiff
Chapter IV: The Secret of Triangle Farm		Bill Finger	Bob Kane	Charles Paris	DC bullpen	Jack Schiff
Chapter V: The Missing Heir Dilemma		Bill Finger	Bob Kane	Charles Paris	DC bullpen	Jack Schiff
Chapter VI: The Two-Bit Dictator of Twin Mills		Al Schwartz	Bob Kane	Charles Paris	Ira Schnapp	Jack Schiff
Chapter VII: Bilss House Ain't the Same		Jack Schiff	Bob Kane	Charles Paris	Ira Schnapp	-
Chapter VIII: The Karen Drew Mystery		Jack Schiff	Jack Burnley	Charles Paris	Ira Schnapp	-
Chapter IX: Their Toughest Assignment		Al Schwartz	Bob Kane	Charles Paris	Ira Schnapp	-
Chapter X: The Warning of the Lamp!		Al Schwartz	Bob Kane	Charles Paris	Ira Schnapp	-
Chapter XI: An Affai fo Death		Al Schwartz	Jack Burnley, Bob Kane	Charles Paris	Ira Schnapp	Jack Schiff
Chapter XII: A Change of Costume		Jack Schiff	Dick Sprang	Stan Kaye	Dick Sprang	-
Chapter XIII: The News That Makes the News		Al Schwartz	Bob Kane	Charles Paris	Ira Schnapp	-
Chapter XIV: Ten Days to Live!		Al Schwartz	Bob Kane	Charles Paris	Ira Schnapp	-
Chapter XV: Acquitted by Iceberg		Al Schwartz	Bob Kane	Charles Paris	Ira Schnapp	-
Chapter XVI: Deadly Professor RAdium		Al Schwartz	Bob Kane	Charles Paris	Ira Schnapp	-

== Batman and Robin (1953) ==
The second series was written by Walter B. Gibson and was published on Sunday only, in September 1953. This short-lived attempt to revive the Batman comic strip ran only in Arrow, the Family Comic Weekly, which was edited by Gibson. A few of these very rare strips are reprinted in the book Batman: The Sunday Classics 1943–46.

== Batman with Robin the Boy Wonder (1966–1973) ==
Although it was credited to "Bob Kane", this series was actually ghostwritten, as noted below. The strip ran on Sunday from May 29, 1966, to July 13, 1969, and daily from May 30, 1966, to 1973. At first, this series was a campy revival drawing on the popularity of the Batman TV show, as exemplified by the guest appearance of celebrities like Jack Benny and public figures like Conrad Hilton. Later, it told more serious Batman stories and featured guest appearances by Batgirl, Superman and Aquaman. A 1970 sequence featuring the Green Arrow and the Man-Bat was reprinted in Amazing World of DC Comics #4-5 (1975). It was syndicated by the Ledger Syndicate.

=== Episode guide ===
Episode #	Fan title	Writer	Artist(s)	Start date	End date	Inc. dailies?	Inc. Sundays?
01D	Catwoman	Whitney Ellsworth	Shelly Moldoff	1966-05-30	1966-07-09	yes	no
01S	A Penguin with Shark Teeth	Whitney Ellsworth	Shelly Moldoff	1966-05-29	1966-07-10	no	yes
02D	Joker on Parole	Whitney Ellsworth	Joe Giella	1966-07-11	1966-09-24	yes	no
02S	The Nasty Napoleon	Whitney Ellsworth	S. Moldoff/J. Giella/C. Infantino	1966-07-17	1966-10-16	no	yes
03D	Jolly Roger	Whitney Ellsworth	Joe Giella	1966-09-26	1966-12-10	yes	no
03S	Batchap and Bobbin	Whitney Ellsworth	Joe Giella	1966-10-23	1966-12-11	no	yes
04	Poison Ivy	Whitney Ellsworth	Joe Giella	1966-12-12	1967-03-18	yes	yes
05	Batman Meets Benny	Whitney Ellsworth	Joe Giella	1967-03-19	1967-04-30	yes	yes
06	Batgirl Begins	Whitney Ellsworth	Joe Giella	1967-05-01	1967-07-09	yes	yes
07	Amnesia	Whitney Ellsworth	Joe Giella	1967-07-10	1967-11-12	yes	yes
08	Zodiac	Whitney Ellsworth	Joe Giella	1967-11-13	1968-04-07	yes	yes
09	Superman's Missing Powers	Whitney Ellsworth	Al Plastino	1968-04-08	1968-08-12	yes	yes
10	Aqua-Batman	Whitney Ellsworth	Al Plastino	1968-08-14	1968-12-16	yes	yes
11	Plastic Surgery	Whitney Ellsworth	Al Plastino	1968-12-17	1969-05-30	yes	yes

The Sunday strips ended July 13, 1969. The daily strips continued and were drawn by Plastino through Jan. 1, 1972, with Nick Cardy assisting on the art toward the end. They were written by Ellsworth until July 1970 and then by E. Nelson Bridwell. E. M. Stout took over the strip on January 3, 1972. Batman and Robin failed to appear regularly in the strip, supposedly teamed up with a new hero called Galexo, who eventually took over until it ended in 1973.

This series was reprinted by The Library of American Comics in a three-volume collection which began in 2014 and was titled Batman - Silver Age Newspaper Comics.

== The World's Greatest Superheroes (1978–1985) ==
From April 3, 1978, to February 10, 1985, Batman appeared in a strip variously titled The World's Greatest Superheroes, The World's Greatest Superheroes Present Superman, and The Superman Sunday Special. It was syndicated by the Chicago Tribune/New York News Syndicate. For information on writers and artists, see Batman: the Sunday Classics 1943–46.

== Batman (1989–1991) ==
The most recent revival of the strip, titled simply Batman, ran Sunday and daily from November 6, 1989, to August 3, 1991. The first story was written by Max Allan Collins and drawn by Marshall Rogers. All of the other stories were written by William Messner-Loebs and drawn by Carmine Infantino and John Nyberg. It was syndicated by Creators Syndicate. All of these strips were reprinted in Comics Revue.

=== Episode guide ===
- "Catwoman"
- "The Penguin"
- "The Joker"
- "Two-Face"
- "Robin"
- "The Riddler"
- "The Mad Hatter"
