= C. M. Payne =

American cartoonist (1873–1964)

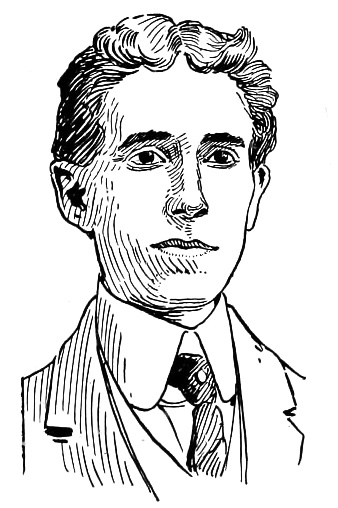
- C. M. Payne
- Born: Charles M. Payne; 1873
- Died: 1964 (aged 90–91)
- Area: Cartoonist
- Pseudonym: Popsy
- Notable works: S'matter, Pop? (1911–1940); Honeybunch's Hubby (November 27, 1909—March 30, 1911; April 19 1931–c. 1934)

Charles M. Payne (1873–1964) was an American cartoonist best known for his popular long-running comic strip S'Matter, Pop?. He signed his work C. M. Payne and also adopted the nickname Popsy.

== Biography ==
In 1896, Payne was employed at the Pittsburgh Post. Coon Hollow Folks, his first comic strip, was followed by Bear Creek Folks, Scary William and Yennie Yonson. He created Honeybunch's Hubby (originally titled Mr. Mush), for the New York World, and in 1911, he drew Peter Pumpkin for The Philadelphia Inquirer. His 1910 strip, Nippy's Pop, was later retitled S'Matter, Pop? Initially carried by the Bell Syndicate, it ran from 1911 to 1940. During the 1920s, S'Matter, Pop? was a Sunday strip in the New York World, followed by decades as a daily strip in The Sun. In the early 1930s, S'Matter, Pop and Honeybunch's Hubby (which returned from a 20-year hiatus) spent times alternating as the main strip and the topper strip.

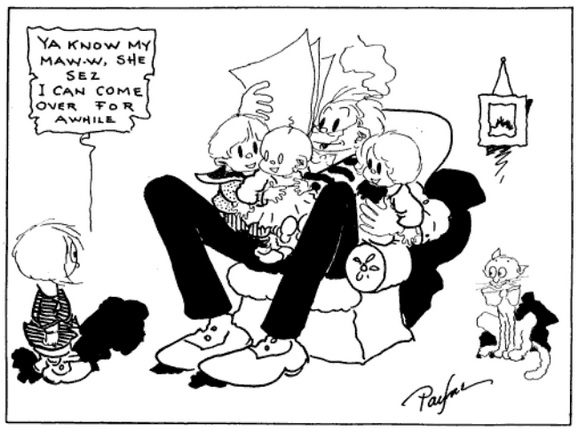
Characters from the comic strips S'matter, Pop? and Say, Pop!

Traveling with his wife and two daughters, Payne spent the summer of 1915 in Los Angeles and Southern California, where he planned an automobile trip to the Panama–Pacific International Exposition in San Diego.

He was a member of the Southern California Camera Club, and in 1920, he exhibited photographs he had taken at remote locations in the Arizona desert.

In 1964, Payne died in poverty.

== Bibliography ==
Bibliography of Charles Payne's comic strip work:

- Bear Creek Folks (aka Coon Hollow Folks), Sunday: Oct 9, 1904 - June 10, 1906
- Scary William, Sunday: Nov 26, 1905 - June 3, 1906
- Little Possum Gang (aka Wild Scenes in Possum Hollow), Sunday: April 4, 1909 - Dec 1, 1912
- Honeybunch's Hubby, weekday: Nov 27, 1909 - March 30, 1911
- Chantecleer -- He's a Bird, weekday: March 3, 1910 - Sept 1, 1910
- Kid Trubbel, Sunday: Aug 7, 1910 - Dec 22, 1912
- S'Matter, Pop? (aka Nippy's Pop), daily/Sunday: July 12, 1911 - Sept 21, 1940
- Peter Pumpkin, Sunday: July 16, 1911 - Nov 5, 1911
- Little Sammy, Sunday: Nov 29, 1914 - Jan 31, 1915
- Say, Pop, daily/Sunday: Jan 2, 1918 - 1921
- Little Johnny Bear, Sunday: Jan 2, 1927 - April 12, 1931
- Honeybunch's Hubby, Sunday topper: April 19, 1931 - 1936
