= A. E. Hayward =

American comic strip artist

- Born: Alfred Mark Hayward; February 14, 1884 Camden, New Jersey, U.S.
- Died: July 25, 1939 (aged 55) New York City, U.S.
- Areas: Syndicated cartoonist, fine artist
- Notable works: Somebody's Stenog
- Spouse: Stella Kelly (m. 1907)

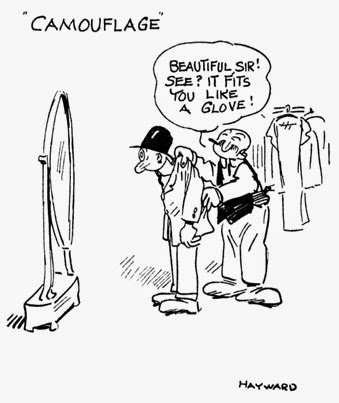
A 1917 cartoon from Hayward's Padded Cell single panel strip

Alfred Earl Hayward (1884 – 1939), was a 20th century American comic strip artist. He was known professionally as A. E. Hayward for his comics work although he used his full name for his fine arts work.

He is best known for his seminal 1918-1941 strip Somebody's Stenog ("stenog" standing for "stenographer"). This strip, featuring flapper-era secretary Cam O'Flage, was one of the first daily strips focusing on an independent woman. It was the first enduring daily strip to have an "office girl" as the protagonist (Note: In 1907 Dink Shannon had created the strip Sallie Snooks, Stenographer which lasted only into 1908 or 1909) and to be concerned with a group of female office workers.

== Early career and painting ==
Hayward was born as Alfred Mark Hayward on February 14, 1884, in Camden, New Jersey, to English immigrants. His father and grandfather were painters, and he became an accomplished watercolorist himself, exhibiting his impressionist landscapes (usually of mountains, and some quite abstract) to critical praise at New York's Fifteen Gallery, the Pennsylvania Academy of the Fine Arts (where he studied), and many cities of the United States and beyond.

In addition to his painting, Hayward worked as a newspaper writer of humorous human interest fare, wrote poetry, and lectured at the Pennsylvania Academy of the Fine Arts, but found his greatest fame when he turned to cartooning.

He created the strip Some Day, Maybe for the New York World in 1912 and Great Ceasar's Ghost, later named Great Ceasar's Goat and later still Pinheads (1913–1915) also for the World. He created Colonel Corn (1915–1918) for the New York Herald and the single-panel Padded Cell (also 1915–1918) for the Public Ledger Syndicate. In Padded Cell he ran a suite of cartoons called Somebody's Stenographer for six weeks in 1916. This served as a prototype for his most successful work.

== Somebody's Stenog ==
Somebody's Stenog first ran on December 16, 1918, preceding (and perhaps in part inspiring) the similarly-themed strips Winnie Winkle (1920) and Tillie the Toiler (1921). The Sunday strip debuted on April 30, 1922. The strip was distributed out of Philadelphia by the Ledger Syndicate. Characters included Cam O'Flage's friend Mary Doodle, her boss Sam Smithers, and her rival Kitty Scratch. Hayward retired from the strip in 1933 and died in 1939; the strip was continued by artists including Ray Thompson and Sam Nichols. The last Somebody's Stenog strip was published May 10, 1941.

The strip was published outside America. In French Canada it ran in La Presse under the title LouLou and in Sweden it ran in Hemmets Journal as Grosshandlare Petterkvist och hans sekreterare ("Merchant Peter Kvist and His Secretary").

Somebody's Stenog was successful enough that Al Capp, shopping Li'l Abner in the mid 1930s, was pressured to instead draw a strip similar to Hayward's.

== Personal life and death ==
Hayward married Stella Kelly on August 28, 1907. They had a daughter, Joyce. Hayward died in New York City on July 25, 1939.
