= Clare Victor Dwiggins =

American cartoonist

- Born: June 16, 1874 Wilmington, Ohio
- Died: October 26, 1958 (aged 84) North Hollywood, California, U.S.
- Area: Syndicated cartoonist
- Pseudonym: Dwig
- Notable works: School Days (1909–1932); Tom Sawyer and Huck Finn (1918–1931)

Clare Victor Dwiggins (June 16, 1874 – October 26, 1958) was an American cartoonist who signed his work Dwig. Dwiggins created a number of comic strips and single-panel cartoons for various American newspapers and newspaper syndicates from 1897 until 1945, including his best-known strip, the long-running School Days (which appeared under a number of different titles).

== Biography ==
Born in Wilmington, Ohio, Dwiggins was on a path toward a career in architecture but detoured into cartooning when his artwork was published in the St. Louis Post-Dispatch and the New York World in 1897. He created a wide variety of gag panels, including J. Filliken Wilberfloss, Leap Year Lizzie, Them Was the Happy Days, Uncle Jim and Tad and Tim, Mrs. Bump's Boarding House, Ophelia and Her Slate and Bill's Diary.

Dwiggins died in a North Hollywood rest home on October 26, 1958, after a long illness.

== Comics ==
Tom Sawyer and Huck Finn comic strip from 1919

Dwig's first comic strip was Home Wanted for Tags, a daily/Sunday strip for the McClure Newspaper Syndicate, which ran from 1910 to 1919. His longest-running strip was Tom Sawyer and Huck Finn (1918–1931), which used more than a half dozen of Mark Twain's characters but employed very little content from his novels.

Dwig began School Days circa 1909 as a single panel, and it eventually evolved into a Sunday strip with a storyline about school kids that continued until c. 1932 (including under the titles Ophelia's Slate, The School Days of Tom Sawyer & Huck Finn, and Golden Days).

Dwig drew Nipper (1931–37) for the Ledger Syndicate. During that same period, he did Footprints on the Sands of Time for the Ledger Syndicate. In 1940, he returned to Huckleberry Finn (also for the Ledger Syndicate), which was reprinted in the pages of Doc Savage Comics and Supersnipe Comics (both published by Street & Smith Comics). He also drew Bobby Crusoe in 1945 for Supersnipe Comics.

=== Comic strips and panels chronology ===
==== 1897-1899 ====
- Adventures of Bobby Crusoe
- J. Filliken Wilberfloss
- Leap Year Lizzie
- Them Was the Happy Days

==== 1900s ====
- Ophelia and her Slate (Sunday gag panel for the New York World, 1900–1911)
- In the Jungle (Sunday gag panel, 1900–1901)
- Pinochle Twins (for The Philadelphia Inquirer (1900–1901)
- Child Book of Jungle Lore in Limericks (Sunday gag panel for The Philadelphia Inquirer, 1900)
- Bolivar (Sunday gag panel for The Philadelphia Inquirer, 1901)
- Gallant Cholly (Sunday gag panel for The Philadelphia Inquirer, 1901)
- The Nabobs (Sunday gag panel for The Philadelphia Inquirer, 1901)
- Professor Gesla (Sunday gag panel for The Philadelphia Inquirer, 1901)
- Little Roland (Sunday gag panel for The Philadelphia Inquirer, 1901–1902)
- School Days / Ophelia's Slate (Sunday strip, 1909–1911)

==== 1910s ====
- Day by Day with the Deys (1910–1919)
- Home Wanted for Tags (Daily/Sunday, for the McClure Syndicate, 1910–1919)
- Pip Gint (Sunday strip for the New York World, 1911)
- White Fibb (Sunday strip, 1911)
- Willie Fibb (Sunday strip, 1911)
- Wunst Upon a Time (Sunday, 1911)
- Makin' Believe (Sunday strip for the New York World, 1912–1913)
- Uncle Jim and Tad and Tim (Sunday gag panel for the McClure Syndicate, 1913–1914)
- Mrs. Bumps Boarding House (Sunday gag panel for the McClure Syndicate, 1913)
- The District School (Sunday strip for the McClure Syndicate, 1914)
- Kidsburg (1915–1916)
- School Days (for the McClure Syndicate, 1917) — also known as The School Days of Tom Sawyer & Huck Finn
- Tom Sawyer and Huck Finn (Daily/Sunday for the McClure Syndicate, 1918–1931)

==== 1920s ====
- A Dog's Life (Sunday strip for the McClure Syndicate, 1926–1929)
- Ophelia's Slate (Daily gag panel for the McClure Syndicate, 1927–1929)
- School Days (McClure Syndicate, 1927–1929)
- Footprints on the Sands of Time (Sunday strip; topper for the Mcclure Syndicate in 1929; for the Ledger Syndicate 1931–1937)

==== 1930s ====
- Golden Days (Daily strip for the McNaught Syndicate, 1930–1931)
- Nipper (Daily/Sunday strip for the Ledger Syndicate, 1931–1937)
- Bill's Diary (Daily gag panel, 1938)

==== 1940s ====
- Huckleberry Finn (Daily strip for the Ledger Syndicate, 1940–1942)

== Books ==
Toasts (1907) published by John C. Winston Co., was a hardcover collection of bawdy and intemperate Edwardian poems and limericks, illustrated with line drawings. After 1945, Dwig focused on illustration, including five books published with August Derleth.
