= Eastern Color Printing =

Printing company and comic book publisher

Eastern Color Printing Company
- Founded: 1928
- Founder: George Janosik
- Defunct: 2002
- Headquarters: Waterbury, Connecticut, United States
- Key people: William B. Pape (VP); Harry I. Wildenberg (sales manager); Max Gaines; Richard J. Pape
- Products: Publisher of comic books
- Divisions: Curtiss-Way division

The Eastern Color Printing Company was a company that published comic books, beginning in 1933. At first, it was only newspaper comic strip reprints, but later on, original material was published. Eastern Color Printing was incorporated in 1928, and soon became successful by printing color newspaper sections for several New England and New York papers. Eastern is most notable for its production of Funnies on Parade and Famous Funnies, two publications that gave birth to the American comic book industry.

Eastern published its own comic books until the mid-1950s, and continued to print comic books for other publishers until 1973. Eastern Color Printing struggled financially from the 1970s to 2002, when the business closed, a victim of changing printing technologies.

== Company history ==
=== Foundation and early years ===
In March 1924, William Jamieson Pape, owner of the Waterbury Republican newspaper in Waterbury, Connecticut, purchased a Goss International single-width printing press to use in printing Sunday color newspaper comics sections. The Knickerbocker Press of Albany, New York, and the Springfield Republican of Springfield, Massachusetts, approached the Republican about using the press to print their own color comics supplements. The Springfield Union soon afterward did as well. Shortly, Pape was selling his color printing services to other newspapers.

A few years later, in August 1928, Pape formed the Eastern Color Printing Company, with himself as vice president and principal executive officer. Replacing the original press with a Goss four-deck press, the company acquired additional presses in 1929 and 1931. During this time period, Eastern, headquartered at 61 Leavenworth Street in Waterbury, established itself in the pulp magazine industry by being one of the few firms to print color covers for the pulps.

From 1928 to 1930, Eastern published 36 issues of a tabloid-format comics periodical, The Funnies, with original comic pages in color, for Dell Publishing. This title was the first four-color comic newsstand publication. Dell, owned by George Delacorte, would later be closely associated with other landmark Eastern Color Printing publications.

Around 1929, Eastern became the first major institution to perfect an engraving process that allowed for the addition of color to black-and-white comics, proving a boon to newspaper syndicates just beginning to introduce full-page Sunday comics sections. From 1929 through 1932, Sunday comic pages were printed in both black-and-white and color.

=== 1930s ===
By 1932, Eastern Color Printing was printing comic sections for a score of newspapers, and by the following year, color for newspapers' Sunday comics section and black-and-white for the daily strips becomes the industry standard.

In 1933, Eastern's 45-year-old sales manager Harry I. Wildenberg reinvented the comic-book format when he saw the increasing popularity of newspaper comic strips and determined comics could be a successful medium for advertising. Sales offices at this time were located in New York City, New York (alternately listed at 40 or 50 Church Street in different sources).

In April 1933, Gulf Oil Company approved Wildenberg's idea and hired artists to create an original, promotional giveaway, Gulf Comic Weekly. Printed by Eastern, the comic measured 10-½" x 15" and was advertised on national radio. Each of its four pages contained a full-color single-page comic strip. The tabloid proved a hit at Gulf service stations. It was retitled Gulf Funny Weekly. Distribution rose to three million copies a week. The series ran as a tabloid until 1939 before adopting the standard comic-book format of the time; it ran a total 422 issues through May 23, 1941. Eastern also published another four-page tabloid, for Standard Oil, titled Standard Oil Comics.

Famous Funnies: A Carnival of Comics (1933)

In early 1933, Eastern also began producing small comic broadsides for the Ledger Syndicate of Philadelphia, printing Sunday color comics from 7 in × 9 in (180 mm × 230 mm) plates. Wildenberg and his coworkers realized that two such plates would fit on a tabloid-sized page, and later that year, Wildenberg created the first modern-format comic book when idly folding a newspaper into halves and then into quarters and finding that a convenient book size. In Spring 1933, Eastern printed one million copies of the first modern-format comic book, the 32-page Funnies on Parade, as a way to keep their press running, and as a promotion for Procter & Gamble.

The names of those associated with the project read as a who's-who of early publishers in what comics historians and fans call the Platinum Age and Golden Age of Comic Books: Max Gaines (founder of EC Comics), Leverett Gleason (publisher of Comic House and other titles, and creator of the Golden Age Daredevil), and many other future industry creators are all brought in to work under Wildenberg's supervision.

The Funnies on Parade promotion proved a success, and Eastern Color that year produced similar periodicals for Canada Dry soft drinks, Kinney Shoes, Wheatena cereal and others, with print runs of from 100,000 to 250,000. By late 1933, Eastern was publishing more giveaways: Famous Funnies: a Carnival of Comics, A Century of Comics, and Skippy's Own Book of Comics. The latter was the first modern-format comic book about a single character.

1934 (early)

Eastern prints Shell Globe, for distribution at 13,000 Shell gas stations. The series features cartoonist Bud Fisher’s popular characters Mutt and Jeff. The characters of Shell Globe are marketed wildly, through miniature figurines, posters, radio announcements, billboards, play masks, and window stickers.

Interest from advertisers tapers off a bit when advertisers doubt that children would be willing to pay money for comic strip reprints. Eastern Color Printing president George Janosik forms a 50/50 joint venture with Dell publisher George Delacorte to publish and market a comic book for retail sales. As a test to see if the public would be willing to pay for comic books, Famous Funnies: Series One, distributed locally, is published and sold for 10 cents each and sells out quickly. 40,000 copies of Famous Funnies: Series One are distributed in chain stores, featuring reprints from the newspaper reprints featured in Eastern’s earlier books. The comic book sells out completely.

1934 – May

Eastern employee Harold Moore proposes a monthly comic book series. Famous Funnies #1 appears with a July cover date. The title loses money at first, and George Delacorte sells his interest back to Eastern. Famous Funnies #2 marks the start of original material produced specifically for the book, and #3 begins a run of Buck Rogers features.

Mid-1934

Famous Funnies turns a profit beginning with issue #7. It gains popularity quickly, and the title lasts about 20 years. The success of Famous Funnies soon leads to the title being sold on newsstands alongside slicker magazines, and inspires at least five other competitors to begin publishing their own comic books. Eastern begins to experiment with modifying the newspaper reprints to be more suitable to the comic book format. Lettering, reduced in reproduction to the point of illegibility, is reworked for the size of the comic book page. Adventure strips, reprinted in several weeks’ worth of strips at a time, is trimmed of panels providing a recap of previous events, contributing to a concise and more smoothly flowing version of the story.

1935

Eastern executive Max Gaines leaves Eastern Color Printing to work for DC Comics. In 1945, Gaines sells all of his comic book properties to DC with the exception of two. These two titles (Picture Stories from the Bible and Picture Stories from World History) are launched under a new publishing venture in 1946 under the name of EC. Although the EC initials stood for both Educational Comics and Entertaining Comics, it has been speculated that the initials were also a tribute to the first comic book company Gaines worked for, Eastern Color [Printing]. (In 1947, Max Gaines dies in a boating accident, and EC is taken over by his son William M. Gaines, who focused production on crime, horror and science fiction. EC was a primary target for Fredric Wertham’s Seduction of the Innocent, and the focus of the senate hearing that followed; the end result was that eventually EC cancelled all of its publications except for Mad.)

1936 – December

Eastern publishes the first issue of The John Hix Scrapbook, reprinting McClure's syndicated strip Strange as It Seems, a Ripley's Believe It or Not!-style collection of illustrated cartoons describing odd historical facts and scientific phenomena. In 1937, Eastern releases a second volume under the name The Second Strange as It Seems Scrapbook.

1937 – July

Having filled up the maximum floor space at their old American press-room at Printers Court, Eastern constructs a separate and new plant on Commercial Street. The new plant includes two new Scott presses.

=== 1940s ===
In addition to publishing its own comic books, Eastern continues to do printing for the majority of publishers in the comic book industry. An article in the Hartford Courant dated Feb. 15, 1954 states that “An executive of one of the largest comic book printing firms in the nation, located in Waterbury, Conn. said 65,000,000 issues are printed each month. Of these 65 million issues, more than 40 per cent are printed in Connecticut.” Eastern Color Printing prints comics and advertising for other publishers through the 1960s, including comic books for Timely (Marvel), EC, and Big Boy Restaurants. Eastern also printed the Sunday funnies for a number of newspapers, including the Waterbury Sunday Republican, the New Haven Register, the Hartford Courant, and newspapers in Boston, Providence, and Worcester.

1940

Eastern introduces its second monthly title, Reg’lar Fellers Heroic Comics. The title is the official publication of Reg’lar Fellers of America, a junior athletic organization dedicated to developing wholesome summer recreation for teens. The title lasts until 1955; it eventually shortens its title to simply Heroic Comics beginning with issue #16 and changes again with issue #41 to New Heroic Comics.

Properties owned by the McNaught Syndicate and published by Eastern Color Printing are transferred to Columbia Comics, publishers of Big Shot Comics and other titles. Eastern appears to have retained a close relationship with Columbia, running advertisements for Columbia books in their own comic book titles.

Eastern Color Printing purchases a new Goss press, its sixth one.

1941

Eastern publishes Dickie Dare, featuring reprints of the newspaper strip of the same name. Dickie Dare features artwork by Bill Everett and Milt Caniff, two influential illustrators of golden age comic books. The series lasts four issues and runs until 1942.

Eastern acquires a seventh press. Finding it necessary to do own cover printing and binding for its successful comic books, Eastern acquires the Curtiss-Way plant in Meriden. Curtiss-Way was a Meriden printing facility dating back at least as far as 1895, when it was known as the Converse Publishing Company.

1941 – April

Inspired by the popular trend of superheroes, Famous Funnies #81 introduces Invisible Scarlet O'Neil, one of comics’ earliest super-heroines, authored by Russell Stamm. This issue marks a change in mood for Famous Funnies, as the covers switch from whimsical gags to more serious adventurous fare.

1941 – November

With the outbreak of World War II, the publishing industry participates in national drives to conserve paper. As a conservation measure, syndicates reduce the size of full-page Sunday comic strips to three-quarters or half the size of the newspaper page. As a result of this size reduction, newspaper strips are no longer suitable for further reduction in the comic book format, and Eastern is forced to commission new work rather than reprint material. Famous Funnies #88 carries the last sets of reprint material from the full-size newspaper page. Beginning with the following issue, Eastern Color Printing starts to commission new work for their comic book publications. Many features from the original Famous Funnies format are continued by the same artists. These artists now turned their strips into dual features – one for newspaper syndication with an emphasis on adult appeal, and the other to fit the new comic book page size and an emphasis on juvenile appeal.

1942

Eastern, needing to expand again, begins construction of an addition to its Commercial Street plant. The addition is completed and operational in 1946. The paper shortage of WWII forces publishers to drop from its standard 64-page format to a 52-page format, and in some cases a 48-page format. Eastern publishes the humor comic Jingle Jangle, which runs until 1949.

1943 – January

Eastern Color Printing alternates publishing Reg’lar Fellers Heroic Comics and a second edition of Heroic Comics on alternate months, switching between stories of everyday heroism and true war stories, respectively. The alternating format continues for a year, then Reg’lar Fellers... is terminated in favor of the more adult-oriented war comic book.

=== 1950s ===
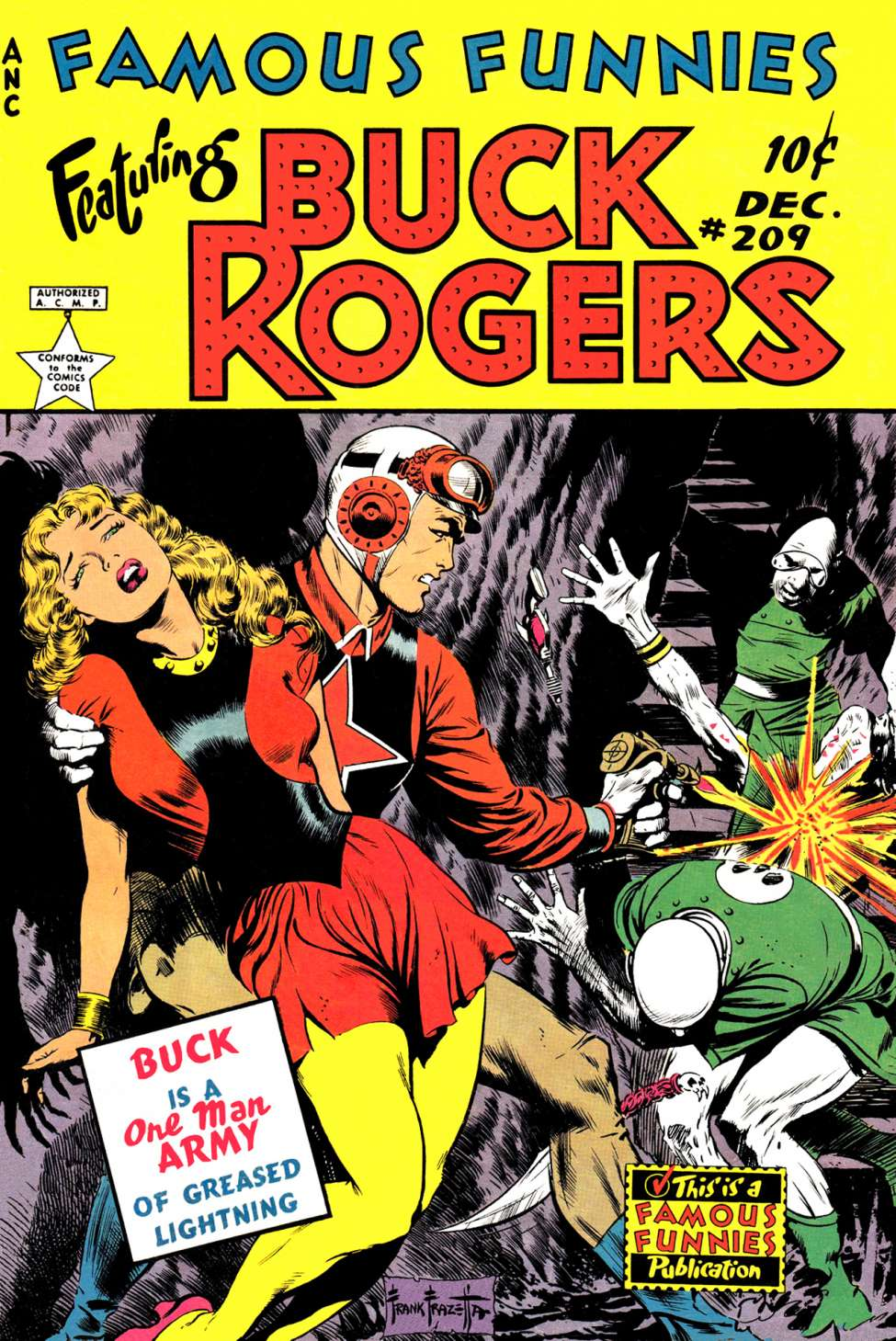
Famous Funnies #209 (December 1953), art by Frank Frazetta.

Eastern Color Printing prints comic books for Export Newspaper Services, a New York–based company producing Spanish-language reprints of American comic books for distribution in Mexico.

1955 – June

Eastern Color Printing clashes with the Comics Code Authority over Heroic Comics. The CCA charges that Heroic – a war-themed comic book – contributes to juvenile delinquency by promoting violence. Eastern defends the title as an illustrated magazine of military history but makes the decision to suspend publication.

1955 – July

Famous Funnies ends publication with issue #218. Eastern constructs a new modern plant in Meriden that is not closely identified with comic book production. With the declining comic book market, Eastern begins to phase out publication of its own comic books, offsetting the shrinkage by printing more advertising circulars. Sunday newspaper comic supplements continue to be a standard product for Eastern.

1957

Eastern Color Printing, continuously installing and modifying its equipment, acquires its 14th press.

=== 1960s ===
Eastern adds a 15th press, which is modified in the mid-1960s.

1960 – June

Eastern Color Printing sells its Curtiss-Way subsidiary to the New York–based Hughes Corporation, owner of several printing plants throughout Connecticut.

1961

After serving about three years at the Curtiss-Way division, Richard J. Pape, William B. Pape’s son, is put in complete charge of Eastern’s mechanical operations.

1968

Plans are formulated for a new building. Several new presses are purchased over the next couple of years.

=== 1970s ===
1972

Eastern Color Printing closes its Waterbury plant and moves to Avon. Around the same time, Eastern sells many of its comic book file copies and cover proofs.

1973

By this time, Eastern phases out its comic book printing business in favor of printing Sunday comics supplements. Sears-Roebuck remains its largest customer.

=== 1980s ===
1987 – January

Eastern Color Printing recruits CEO Robert Palmer. The following September, management of Eastern passes from the Pape family to Palmer.

1987 – February

Eastern suffers the loss of a Goss press valued at over $1 million in a fire at the plant.

1989

Eastern suffers a significant setback with the loss of its longtime customer, Sears Roebuck and Company. Sears-Roebuck converts all print advertising to heatset, a process Eastern is not equipped to produce. Within 6 weeks, Eastern loses approximately 40% of its sales.

1989–1990

Eastern embarks on a rebuilding program to replace the lost Sears business. The company experiences financial hardships compounded by the recession. After losing more customers to heatset printers, Eastern approaches Rockwell Graphics System (Goss) in 1993 about installation of a heatset press, which is installed the following year.

=== 1990s ===
1999

Eastern incorporates digital technology into its pre-press processes. Eastern stays in business by printing advertising for corporations such as Circuit City, Michaels Stores, and Media Play.

=== 2000s ===
2002 – June

Eastern Color Printing goes out of business.

== Published titles ==
- The Amazing Willie Mays (1 issue, 1954)
- Big Chief Wahoo (7 issues, 1942-1943)
- Buck Rogers (6 issues, 1940-1943)
- Buster Crabbe (12 issues, 1951-1953)
- Club 16 Comics (4 issues, 1948-1949)
- Conquest (1 issue, 1955)
- Dickie Dare (4 issues, 1941-1942)
- Dover the Bird (1 issue, 1955)
- Famous Funnies - Series One (1 issue, 1934)
- Famous Funnies (218 issues, 1934-1955)
- Heroic Comics (97 issues, 1940-1955. Initially as Reg'lar Fellers' Heroic Comics and during the final years as New Heroic Comics)
- Jingle Jangle Comics (42 issues, 1942-1949)
- The John Hix Scrapbook (2 issues, 1938-1939)
- Juke Box Comics (6 issues, 1948-1949)
- Mickey Finn (4 issues, 1942-1944, thereafter continued by Columbia Comics)
- Movie Love (22 issues, 1950-1953)
- Napoleon and Uncle Elby (1 issue, 1942)
- Oaky Doaks (1 issue, 1942)
- Personal Love (33 issues, 1950-1955)
- Steve Roper (5 issues, 1948)
- Strictly Private (2 issues, 1942)
- Sugar Bowl Comics (5 issues, 1948-1949)
- Tales from the Great Book (4 issues, 1955-1956)

Giveaways include

- Century of Comics (1 issue, 1933)
- Famous Funnies: A Carnival of Comics (1 issue, 1933)
- Funnies on Parade (1 issue, 1933)
- Gulf Funny Weekly/Gulf Comic Weekly (422 issues, 1933-1941)
- Skippy’s Own Book of Comics (1 issue, 1933)
- Standard Oil Comics (19 issues, 1933-1934)
- Toy World Funnies (1 issue, 1933)
