= C. W. Kahles =

American cartoonist, 1878-1931

- C. W. Kahles in 1929
- Born: Charles William Kahles; January 12, 1878; Lengfurt, Kingdom of Bavaria, German Empire
- Died: January 21, 1931 (aged 53); Great Neck, New York, U.S.
- Occupation: Cartoonist
- Notable work: Inventing daily comic-strip continuity

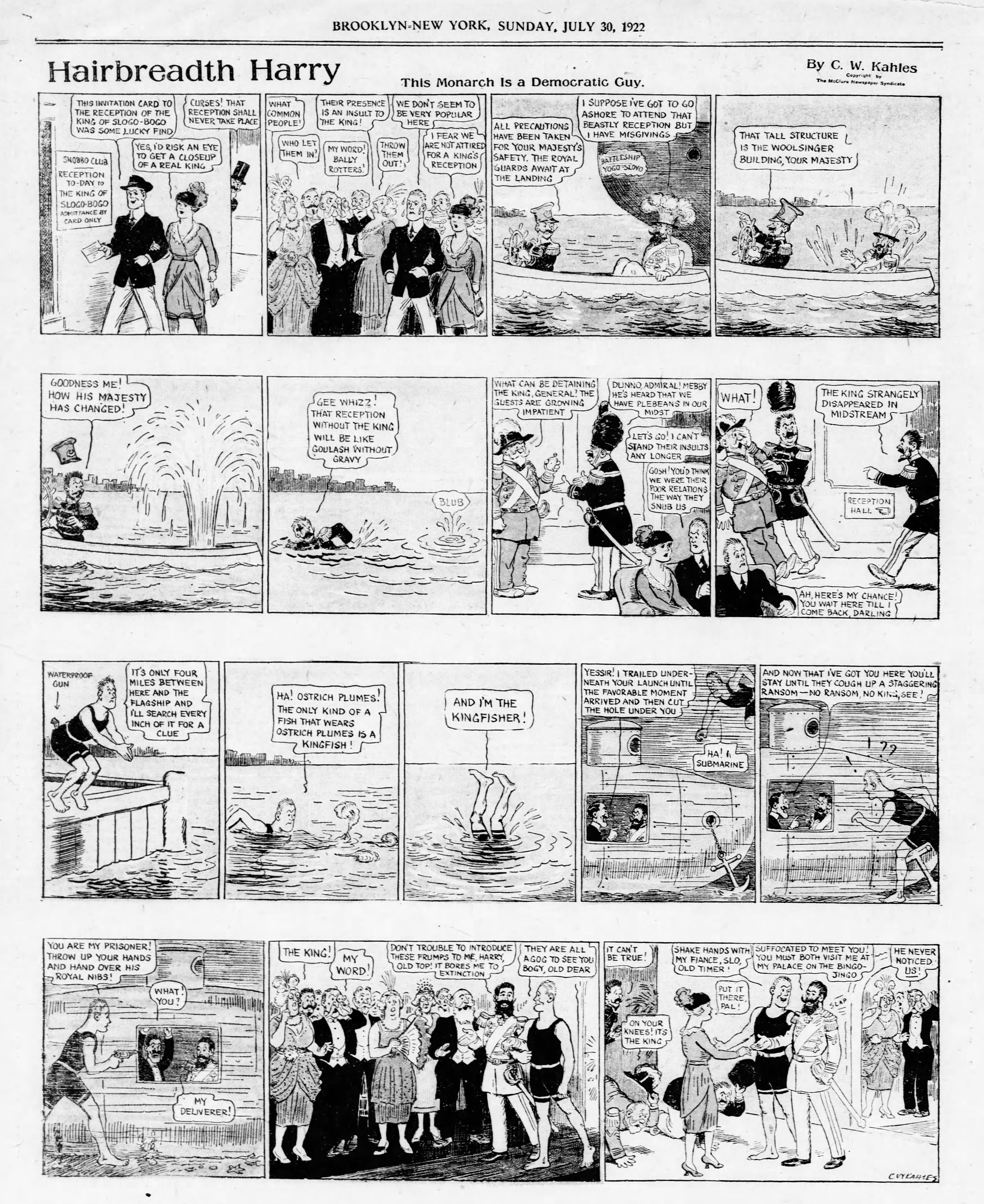
Hairbreadth Harry comic strip

Charles William Kahles (German: [ˈkaːləs]; January 12, 1878 – January 21, 1931) was a prolific German-born American cartoonist responsible for numerous comic strips, notably Hairbreadth Harry. He is credited as the pioneer of daily comic strip continuity with his Clarence the Cop, which he drew for the New York World in 1900–09, introducing to newspapers the innovation of continuing a comic strip story in a day-to-day serial format.

The cartoonist and comics historian Ernest McGee called Kahles the "hardest working cartoonist in history, having as many as eight Sunday comics running at one time (1905-06) with no assistants to help him." Between 1898 and 1931, Kahles drew a total of 25 comic strips, in addition to paintings, book illustrations and advertisements. At the same time he was contributing single-panel cartoons to Life, Judge, Puck, Browning's Magazine and the Pleiades Club Year Book.

== Comic strips ==
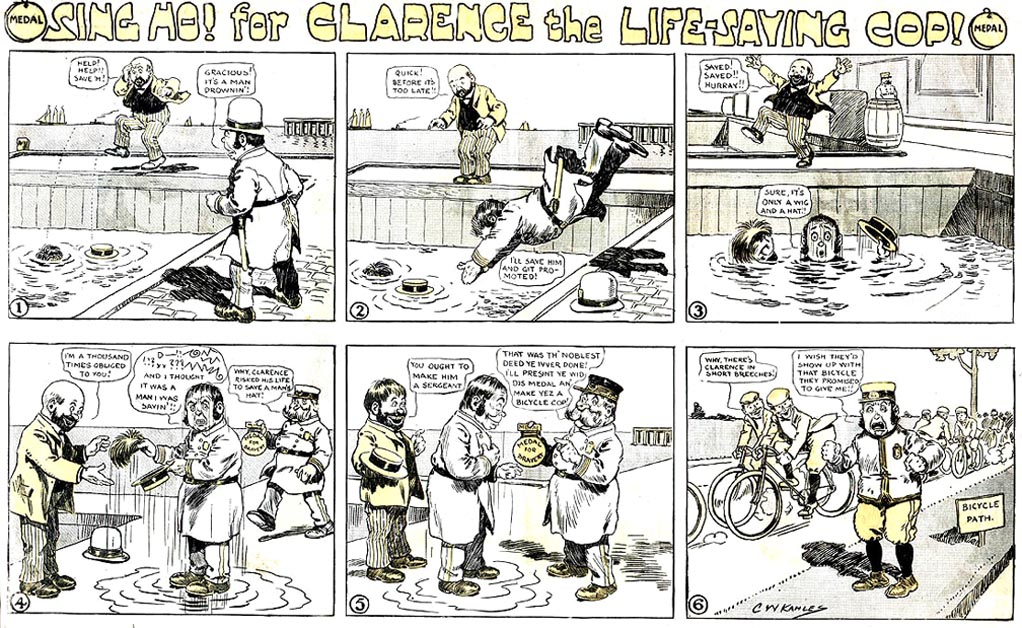
A 1902 Clarence the Cop strip

Born in Lengfurt, in the Kingdom of Bavaria, Kahles arrived in America at the age of seven. His family settled in Brooklyn, New York, living in the Windsor Terrace neighborhood, then a semi-rural area. Young Charles Kahles grew up in Brooklyn, where he lived for many years. With plans to become a painter, he studied art at Pratt Institute and also attended the Brooklyn Art School. His first art job was in the stained glass shop of Joseph Hausleiter in Brooklyn, working alongside his brother Fred. At the age of 16, he went to Williamsport, Pennsylvania, where he became the staff artist on the newspaper Grit, followed by a short spell as a staff artist at the New York Recorder. In 1897–98, he drew assignments for the New York Journal, where he also contributed cartoons. In 1898, he was hired as a news illustrator by the New York World, where he also drew such comics as The Little Red Schoolhouse, Butch the Butcher's Boy, The Perils of Submarine Boating, Clumsy Claude, Optimistic Oswald and The Kelly Kids. In 1900, Clarence the Cop was the first police strip, and his Sandy Highflyer, the Airship Man (1902–04), was the first aviation comic strip. Foolish Fred ran from September 25 to December 11, 1904.

In 1924, Kahles gave an interview to the Brooklyn Daily Eagle in which he stated that he had seven weekly strips running simultaneously when he was 27 and 28. The strips he introduced in 1905 were Billy Brag, Billy Bounce, Pretending Percy, The Teasers, Mr. Buttin, Terrible Twins, Doubting Thomas and Fun in the Zoo. The following year, he added several new strips to the original group: Our Hero's Hairbreadth Escapes, The Funny Side Gang, The Merry Nobles Three—They Can Never Agree.

== Hairbreadth Harry ==
His best-known creation was the comic strip Our Hero's Hairbreadth Escapes, later retitled Hairbreadth Harry, the Boy Hero and eventually just Hairbreadth Harry. It depicted Harry's many attempts to rescue Beautiful Belinda from the villainous Relentless Rudolph. In order to concentrate on Hairbreadth Harry, he dropped the other strips by 1923.

== Influence ==
Kahles was an influence on several cartoonists and strips, including Harry Hershfield’s Desperate Desmond and Dauntless Durham of the U. S. A. and Ed Wheelan’s Midget Movies.

In 1931, at the age of 53, he died of angina pectoris at his home in Great Neck, Long Island, where he had lived for 13 years. He was survived by his widow Helen and daughter Jessie.

After Kahles' death, his strip was continued by F. O. Alexander for another eight years.

== Biography ==
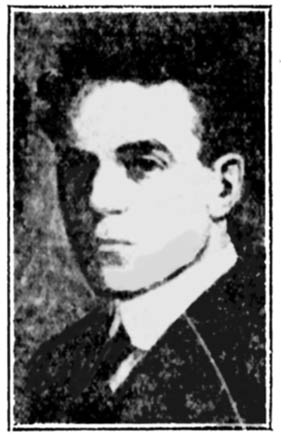
C. W. Kahles in 1919

Curses! Foiled Again! is an unpublished biography of Kahles by his daughter, Jessie Phelps Kahles Straut (September 22, 1911 – November 23, 1998), of Jacksonville, Florida. Before her 1955 marriage, she was a secretary to the Department of Architecture at the Museum of Modern Art and an associate editor of Interiors magazine. She also did shorter biographical sketches in 1969 and 1975, followed by "More on C. W. Kahles" for Cartoonews no. 15 (1977).
