= F. O. Alexander =

American cartoonist (1897–1993)

- Born: Franklin Osborne Alexander; November 3, 1897 St. Louis, Missouri, U.S.
- Died: January 17, 1993 (aged 95)
- Areas: Syndicated cartoonist, editorial cartoonist
- Notable works: Hairbreadth Harry; Philadelphia Bulletin political cartoonist
- Awards: National Headliners Award, 1945

F. O. Alexander's Hairbreadth Harry (from 1930s), featuring a Hamlet parody.

Franklin Osborne Alexander (November 3, 1897 – January 17, 1993), known professionally as F. O. Alexander, was a comic strip artist and editorial cartoonist. He is credited for having designed the board game Monopoly, including the iconic mascots and characters.

== Biography ==
A native of St. Louis, Missouri, Alexander studied at the Chicago Academy of Fine Arts, taking several courses in cartooning and also attended Northwestern University. In World War I he served with the Camouflage Engineers in Europe.

During the mid-1920s, Alexander launched two comic strips, Finney of the Force (1925–31) and The Featherheads (1926–36), but he is best known for the comic strip Hairbreadth Harry, which he took over in 1931 after the death of its creator, C. W. Kahles. Alexander did this strip for eight years and then dropped it in 1939. Alexander also drew editorial cartoons for United Features Syndicate and, in 1941, he became the staff political cartoonist for the Philadelphia Bulletin. Alexander's career at the Bulletin spanned 26 years.

According to Smithsonian Magazine, Alexander designed the famous board game Monopoly for Parker Brothers in 1935, including creating the "Go to Jail" Officer Edgar Mallory, Jake the Jailbird, and mascot Milburn Pennybags characters.

Alexander was the designer of the 1952 U.S. commemorative postage stamp honoring newspaper boys.

In 1966, Alexander donated more than 1000 of his cartoon originals to Syracuse University. The art is housed in the university's Special Collections Research Center.

F. O. Alexander retired in 1967.

== Awards ==
His work was recognized by the Freedoms Foundation and the National Safety Council. In 1945 he received a National Headliners Award.
