= Billy Bounce =

Comic strip

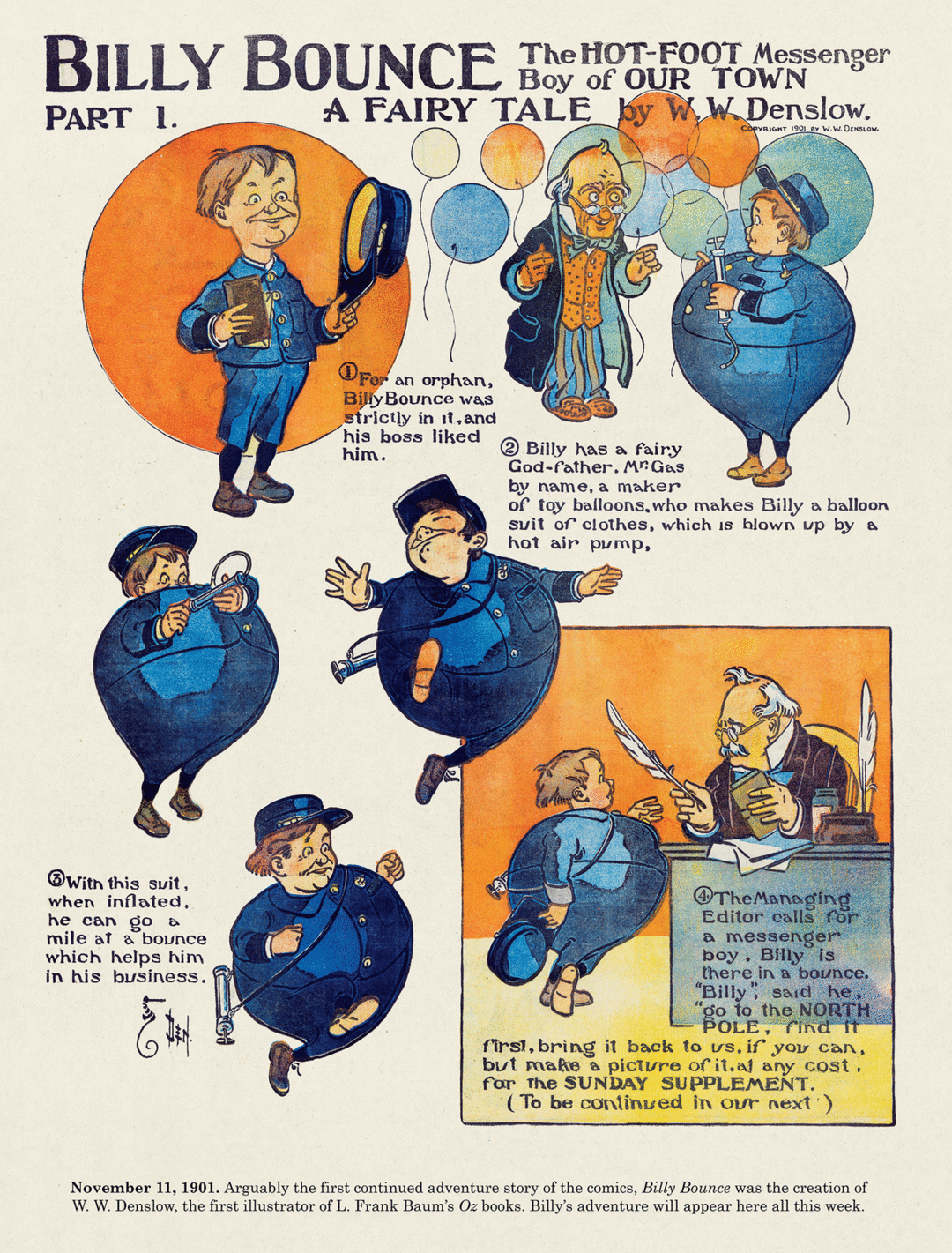
- Author: W. W. Denslow (1901-1902); C. W. Kahles (1902–1905)
- Current status/schedule: Concluded
- Launch date: November 10, 1901; 124 years ago
- End date: December 3, 1905; 120 years ago
- Syndicate: McClure Newspaper Syndicate
- Genre: Humor

Billy Bounce was a comic strip published by noted illustrator W. W. Denslow (1901–1902) and later C. W. Kahles (1902–1905) between November 10, 1901, and December 3, 1905, with a series of reprints in 1908 and 1909. The strip centers on the actions of the title character, a ball-shaped boy who is capable of bouncing long distances. It is noted as one of the earliest comic strips in which the protagonist has superpowers.

Denslow also prepared a children's book titled Billy Bounce published by G. W. Dillingham Company, New York, in September 1906. Denslow provided the illustrations while the text was written by Dudley A. Bragdon. The book is "only slightly" related to the comic. The incidences and characters are almost entirely new.

== Comic ==
Douglas G. Greene and Michael Patrick Hearn suggest that, unlike earlier popular comics such as Richard F. Outcault's The Yellow Kid and Rudolph Dirks' The Katzenjammer Kids, Billy Bounce was conceived as a fairytale narrative, funny, but not devoted solely to jokey content. The first five issues were subtitled "a Fairytale". Furthermore, Denslow may have been the originator of the story-strip. The story centers on Billy Bounce who is given an inflatable suit by his fairy godfather which enables him to jump enormous distances. For example, in the inaugural issues he goes to the North Pole by way of Greenland.

The McClure Newspaper Syndicate initially published Billy Bounce in a weekly supplement, full-page and in color. Following the success of Denslow's Mother Goose, Denslow began to merge Billy Bounce and Mother Goose. A strip for New Year, 1902, has Mother Goose and Billy Bounce characters parading in front of Mother Goose herself. Printed titles referred to Billy Bounce and/or Mother Goose, depending on the content. For simplicity, they are all referred to here as Billy Bounce comics.

Greene and Hearn describe the quality of the early instalments as unmatched prior to Winsor McCay's classic Little Nemo in Slumberland (launched about four years after Billy Bounce). The comic was popular and a variety of items such as Billy Bounce buttons and toys were sold. However, Denslow soon began to lose interest in it. Beginning April 20, 1902, the format was reduced to half a page typically with six panels. He retired from Billy Bounce in August 1902, less than two years after its inception. McClure replaced him with Charles W. Kahles, who revitalized it. Denslow's comics continued to be printed until October 5, 1902, and Kahles' version began the following week.

Like its contemporary, Little Nemo in Slumberland, the strip dealt with otherworldly situations and often had recurring characters, including Denslow's Fuzzy White (a polar bear) and The Pieman, as well as Kahles' the King of the Pollywogs. Fuzzy White was often Billy's reluctant sidekick in adventures that end in crashes or other mishaps, while Billy was unfazed. The Pieman, was designed to be unsympathetic to children, was developed from The Pieman in Denslow's Simple Simon who refuses to give Simple Simon a pie unless he pays for it. In Billy Bounce, The Pieman was often mean or rude to other characters but had a comeuppance in the final panel.

The Pollywogs, introduced by Kahles on October 9,1904, were cloven-footed humanoid characters with antennae who lived on another planet. Billy Bounce's antics provided the King of the Pollywogs an informal education. The printed title above each strip changed depending on the story and characters included, such as:
Billy Bounce and Fuzzy White take Lo, the Cigar Store Indian, to the Fancy Dress Party where he makes a hit; and Billy Bounce and the Pollywogs: Wiseguy the Poet Busts the Mirror.

== Book ==
Denslow undertook the Billy Bounce book to pave the way for a musical extravaganza in the mold of The Wizard of Oz (1902 musical) and The Pearl and the Pumpkin, which had been profitable for him. He engaged a new collaborator, Dudley A. Bragdon, to write the book and the script for the musical while he did color illustrations to interest producers. The book was accepted by G. W. Dillingham Co. and was published in 1906. about a year after the Billy Bounce comic was discontinued.

The preface of the book and announcements in newspapers emphasized that there was nothing to frighten children in the book and that it was intended as a moral to caregivers not to elicit bugaboos to discipline children. However, the tame storytelling did not make for exciting reading, at least for adults.

=== Plot ===
As described by Greene and Hearn: "The story begins with the scheme of a parody-industrialist, 'Nickel Plate, the polished Villain,' to capture the bee Honey Girl and replace her with Glucose, thereby cornering the market in honey". Billy Bounce is a messenger boy and is given a message by Silver Plate to deliver to Bogie Man, his accomplice. However, he does not give Billy the address. Billy goes to his fairy godfather, Mr. Gas, for help and is given a ball-like inflatable suit which enables him to jump great distances but Mr. Gas does not tell him which direction to go. Nevertheless, Billy Bounce sets forth. After a jump, he lands near Princess Honey Girl's entourage. Her guards capture Billy, but Honey Girl intervenes. She tells Billy Bounce of her plight and Billy pledges to thwart Silver Plate's plot. However, he is still intent on delivering the message. For reasons that are not explained, Silver Plate and I. B. Bumbus, his traitorous but bumbling assistant, now attempt to prevent Billy Bounce from delivering the message. The following chapters describes how Billy Bounce proceeds—bouncing from one challenge to the next. Each time he is able to overcome typical childhood fears including superstitions, mirages, bugbears, scalawags, ghosts, etc., even the north wind whose whistling and howling in winter scares children. In the end, Billy captures Bogie Man and Silver Plate's plot is foiled. Billy Bounce presents Bogie Man to Honey Girl, now queen, in her palace. Much like Oz, the Great and Terrible, in The Wizard of Oz (1950 film) Bogie man turns out to have no real power and is only able to attain his ends by deception.

=== Illustrations ===
Denslow did 16 full-page illustrations for the book as well as several spot illustrations. He was less ambitious for this work than for "The Pearl and the Pumpkin"; for example, there were no chapter head or tailpieces and the spot illustrations were in black and white rather than color.

=== Reception ===
Greene and Hearn called Bily Bounce "the worst children’s book of Denslow's career". On the other hand, contemporary newspaper announcements and reviews were complimentary particularly of Denslow's illustrations and its mission to dispell childhood fears. A review in the Spokesman-Review had this assessment:

The book is entirety clean of bloodshed, deceit or cruelty of any kind, fun, wit, rapid movement and harmless excitement being its prime features. But so combined as to make a story of absorbing interest.

— The Spokesman-Review, Nov. 11, 1906

Apparently there are no surviving sales figures for the book, however the scarcity of surviving books suggest that it did not do well. Rather than promoting the proposed musical, its child-centered, rambling storyline probably discouraged producers. Denslow and Bragdon copyrighted the script but could not get it produced.

== Gallery ==
Continuation of Denslow's initial Billy Bounce comic storyline,
and an example of C. W. Kahles' version of the Billy Bounce comic.
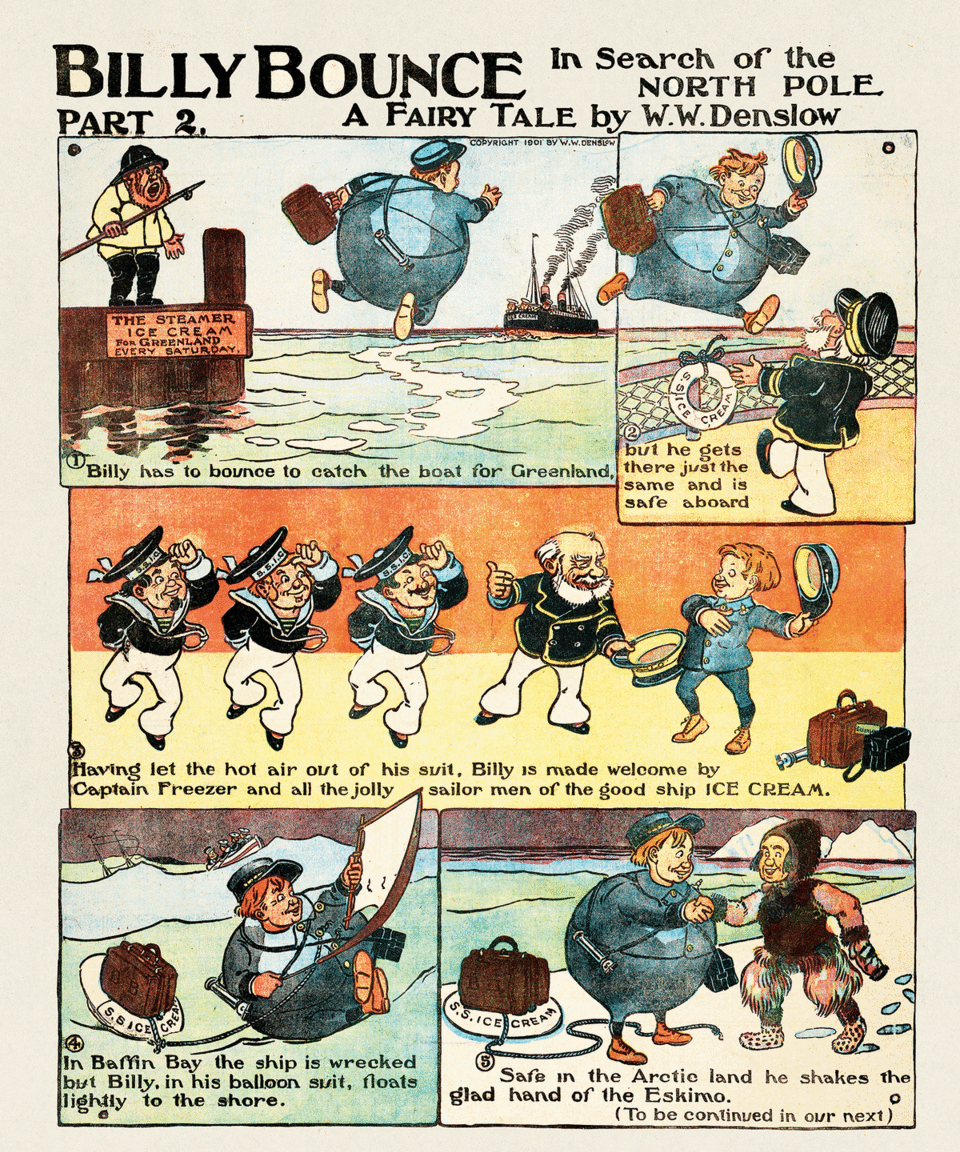
Billy Bounce, the Hot-Foot Boy Messenger in Search of the North Pole, Part 2, November 17, 1901.

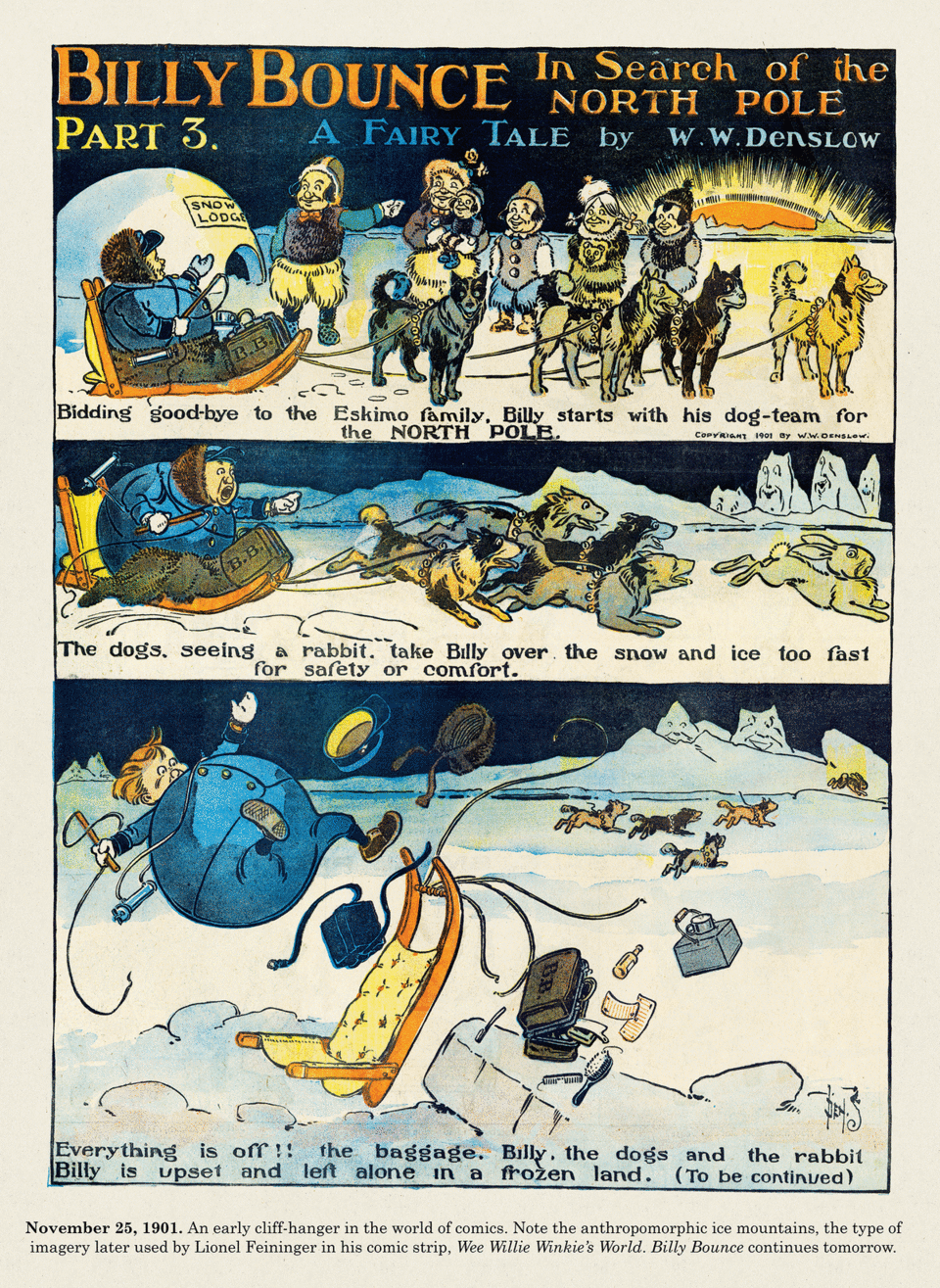
Billy Bounce, the Hot-Foot Boy Messenger in Search of the North Pole, Part 3, November 24, 1901.)

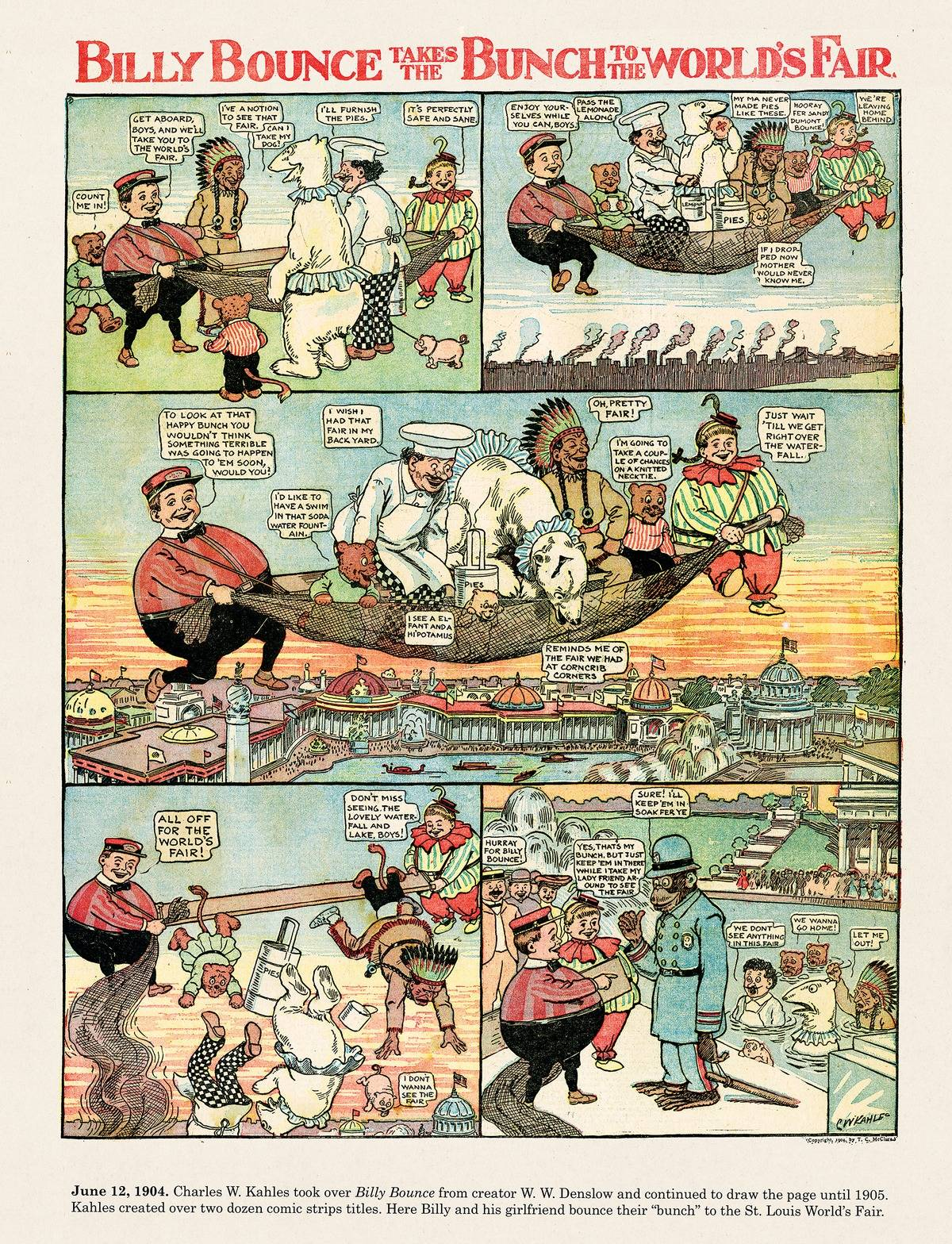
Kahles: Billy Bounce Takes the Bunch to the World's Fair, June 11, 1904.
Examples of W. W. Denslow's Billy Bounce comics from the Barnacle Press archive.
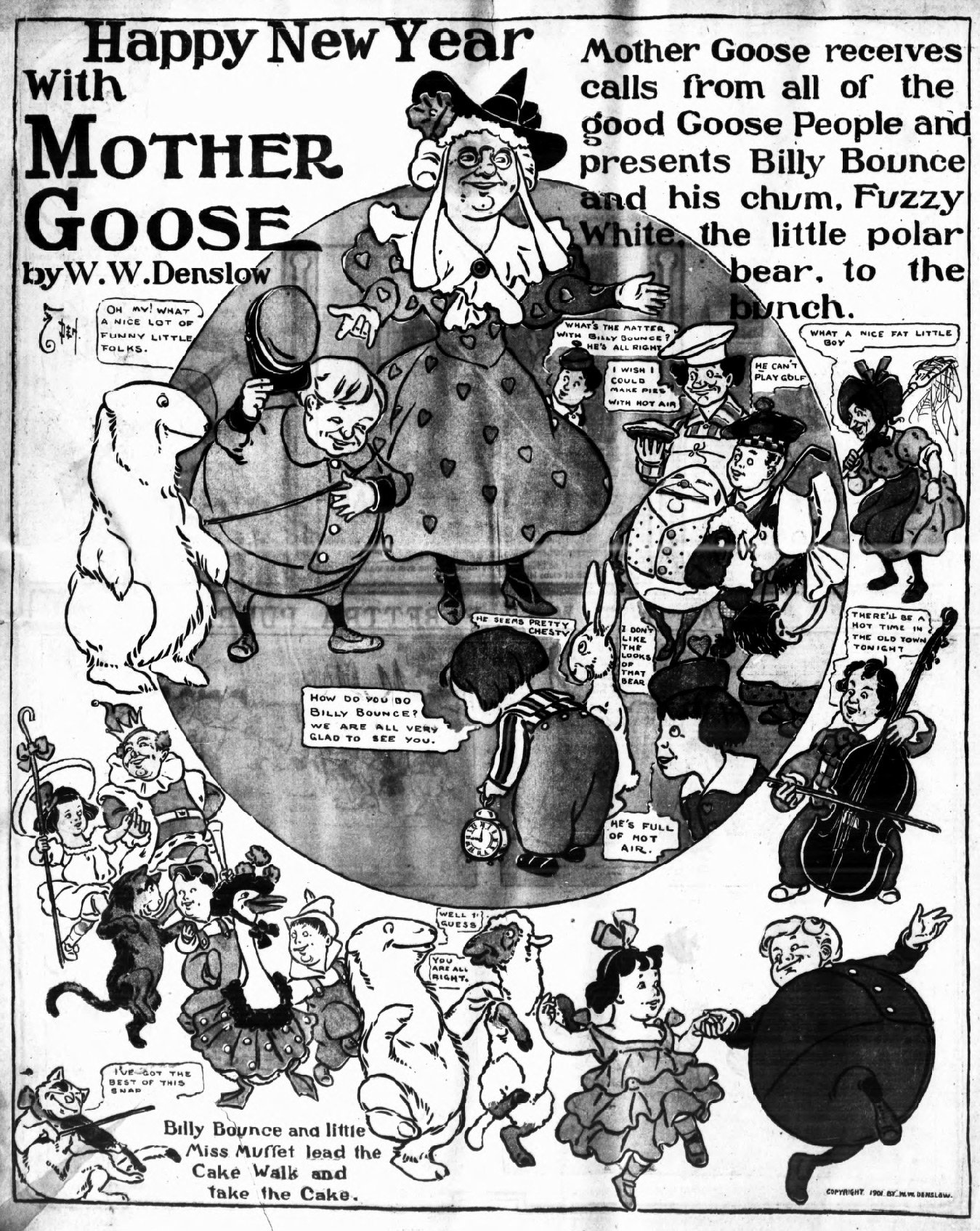
Happy New Year with Mother Goose, December 29, 1901.

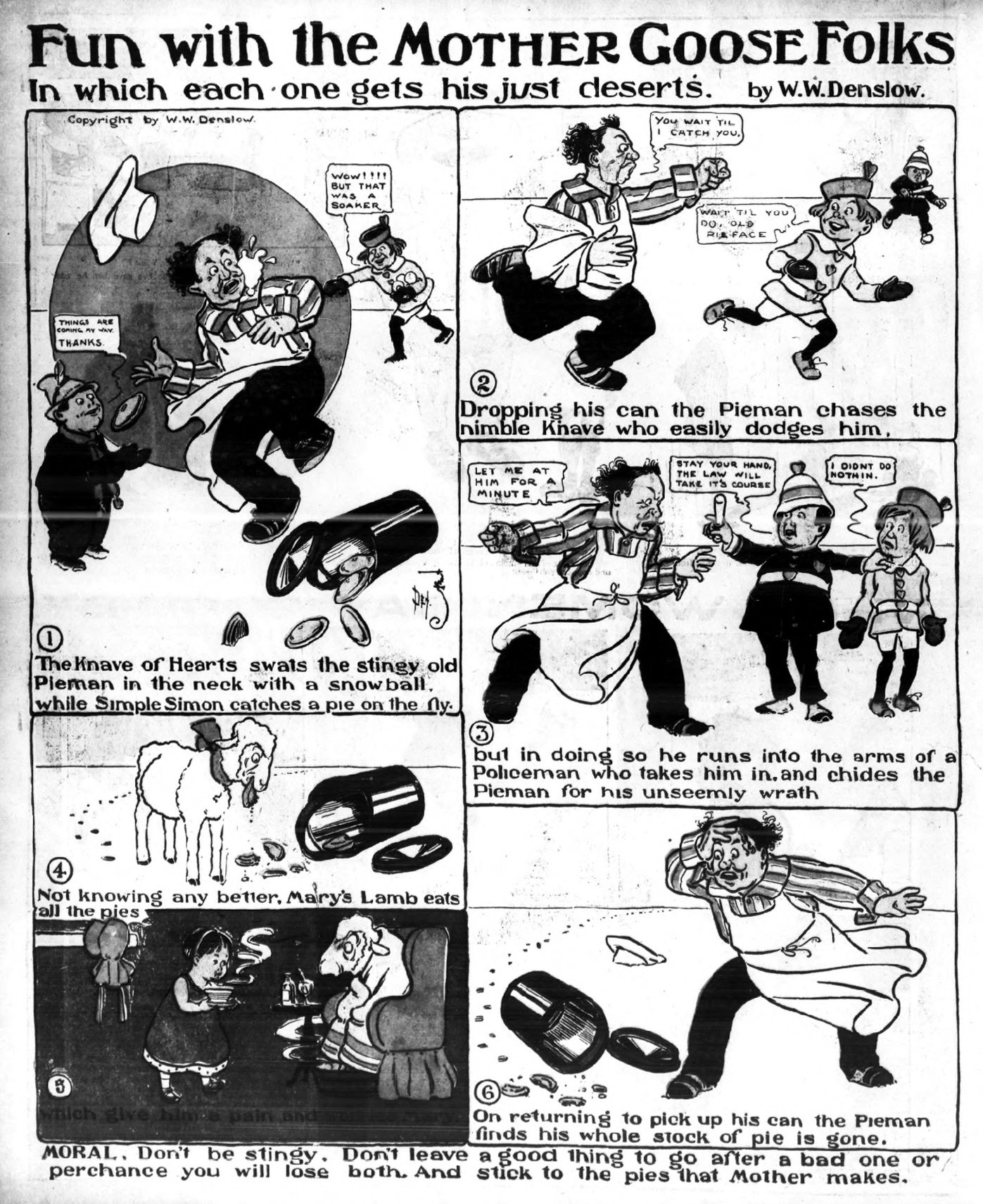
Fun with the Mother Goose Folks, in which one gets his just deserts, January 26, 1902.

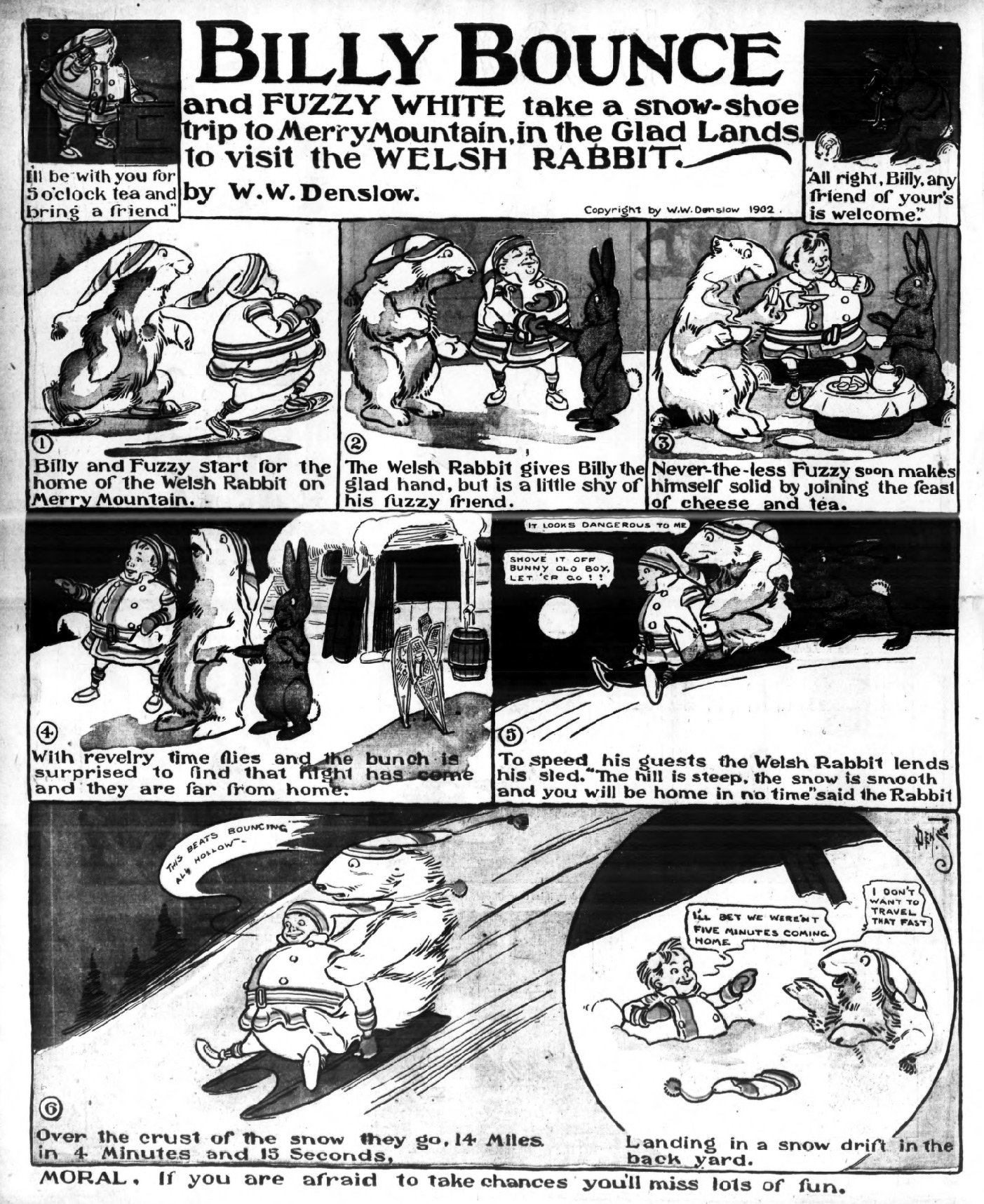
Billy Bounce and Fuzzy White Take a Snow Shoe Trip to Merry Mountain in the Glad Lands to Visit Welsh Rabbit, February 2, 1902.

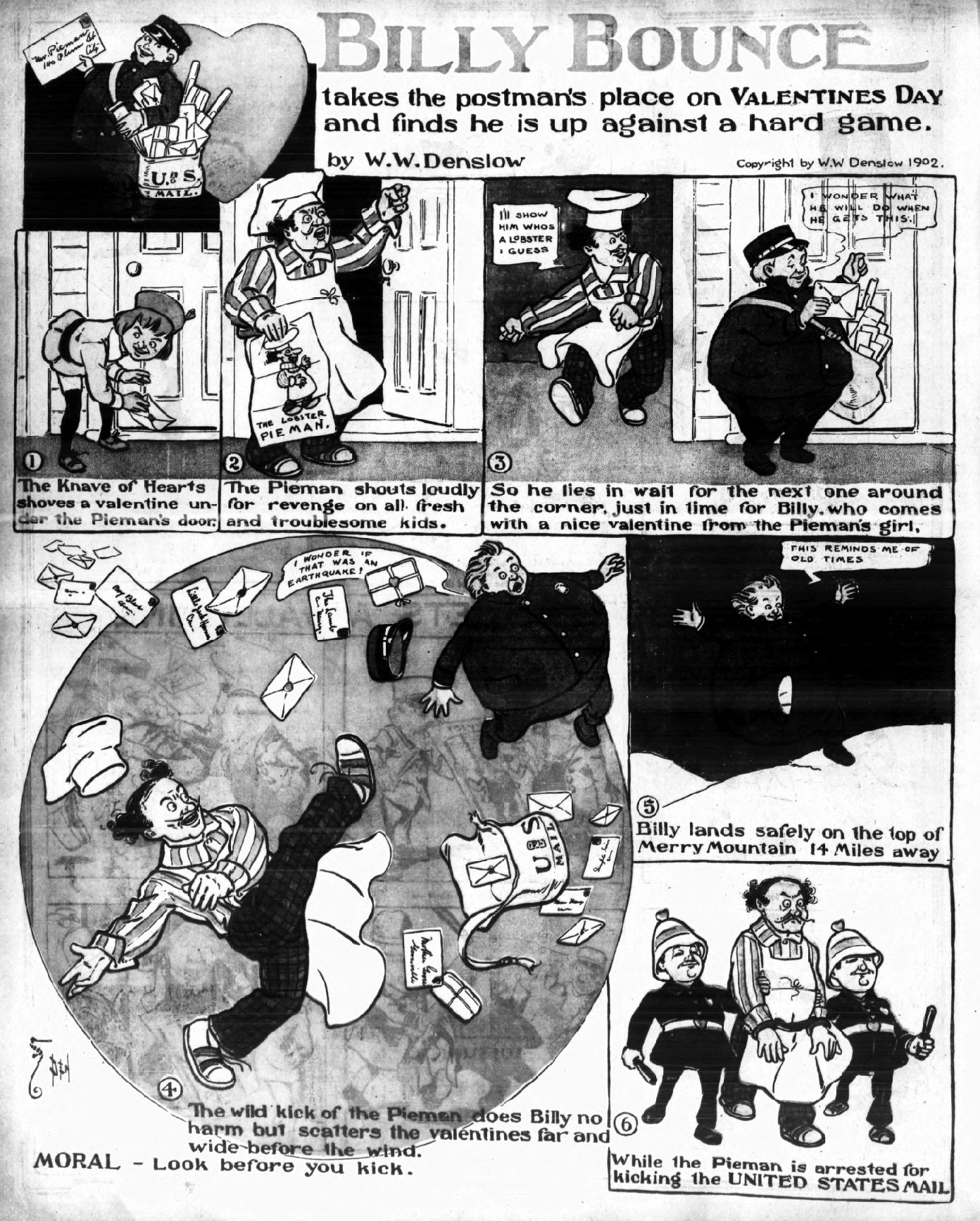
Billy Bounce Takes the Postman's Place on Valentines Day and Finds He Is Up Against a Hard Game, February 9, 1902.

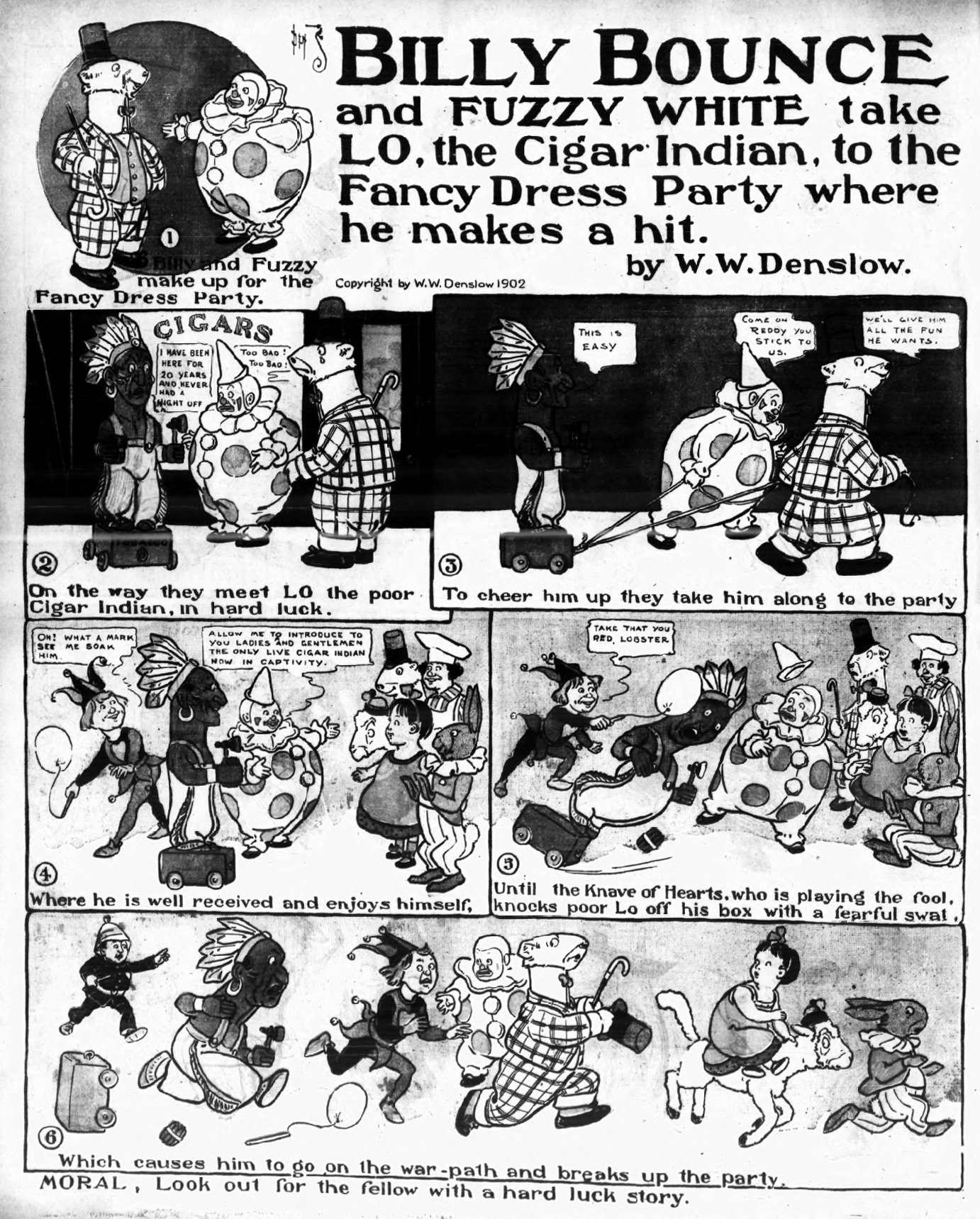
Billy Bounce and Fuzzy White Take Lo, The Cigar Store Indian, to the Fancy Dress Party Where He Makes a Hit, February 23, 1902.

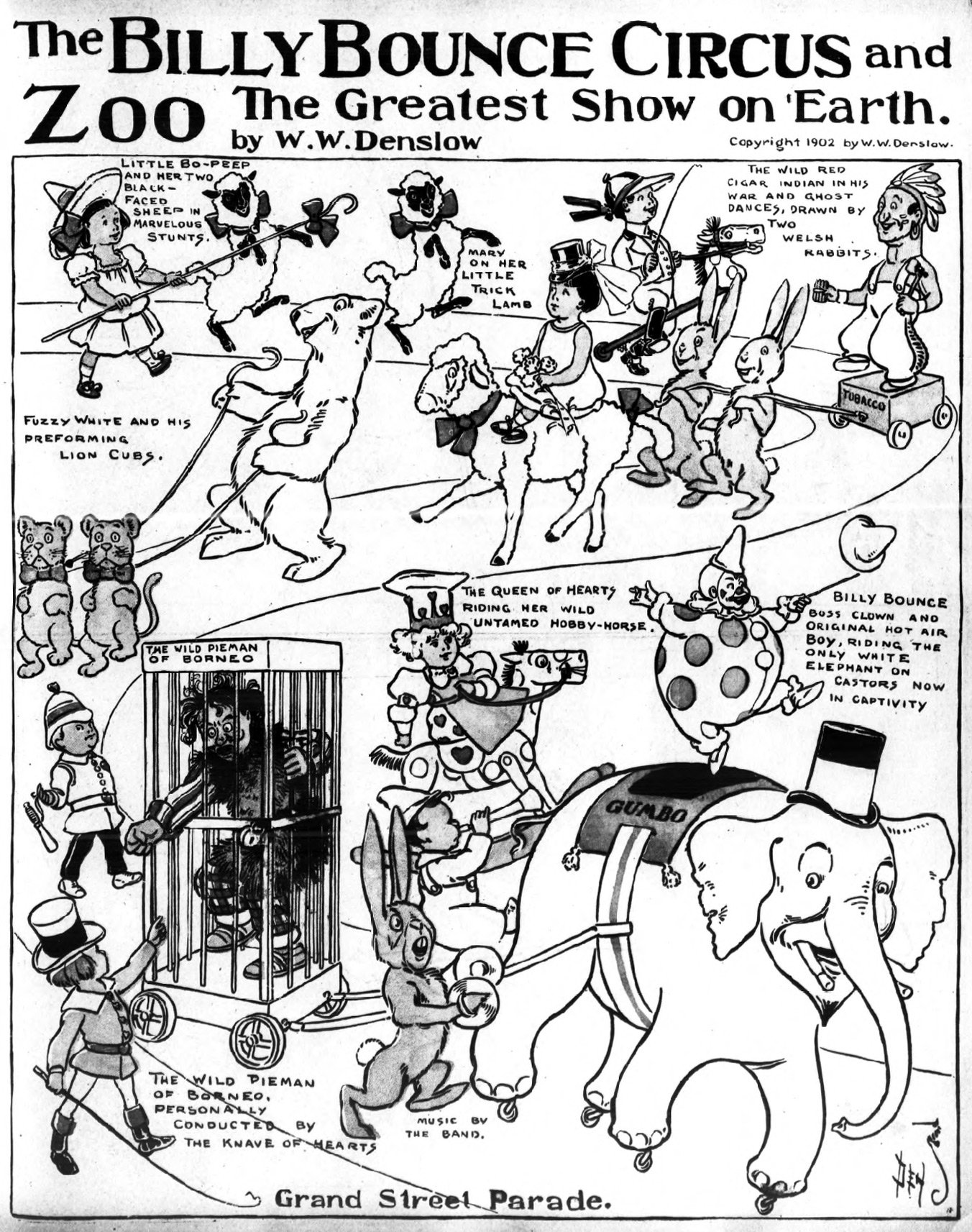
The Billy Bounce Circus and Zoo, the Greatest Show on Earth, May 11, 1902.

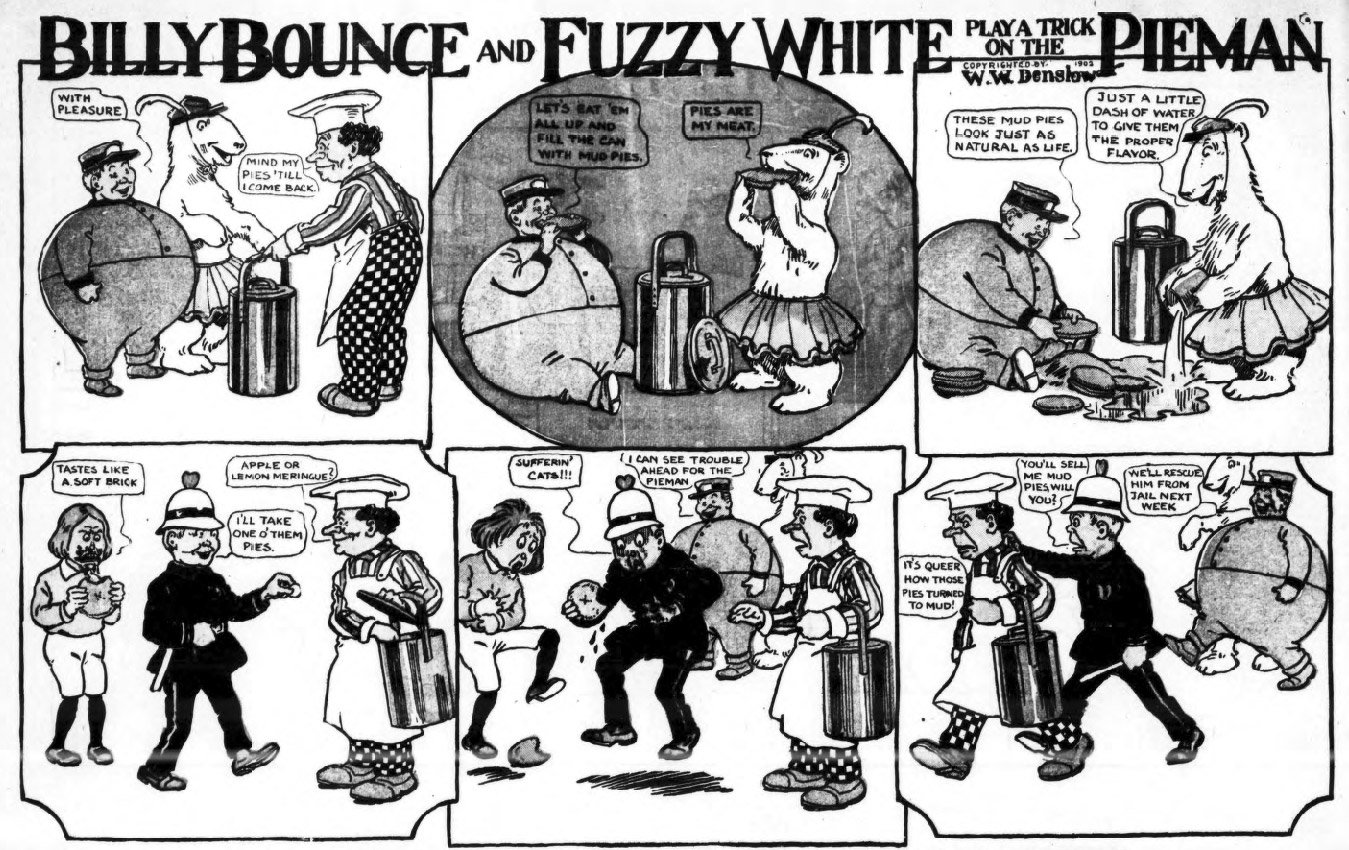
Billy Bounce and Fuzzy White Play a Trick on The Pieman. W. W. Denslow's next to last Billy Bounce comic, September 28, 1902.

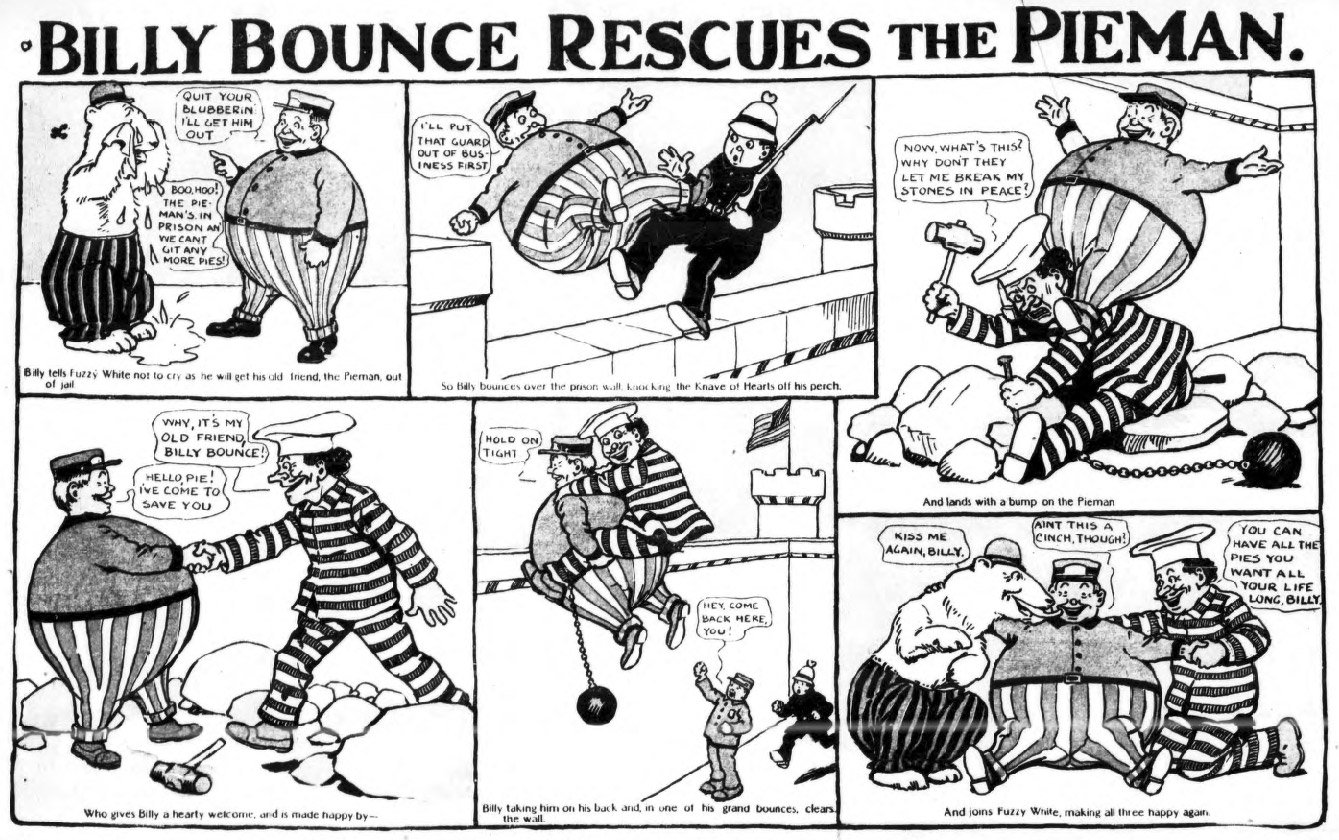
Billy Bounce Rescues The Pieman. W. W. Denslow's last Billy Bounce comic, October 5, 1902.
Examples of C. W. Kahles' Billy Bounce comics from the Barnacle Press archive.
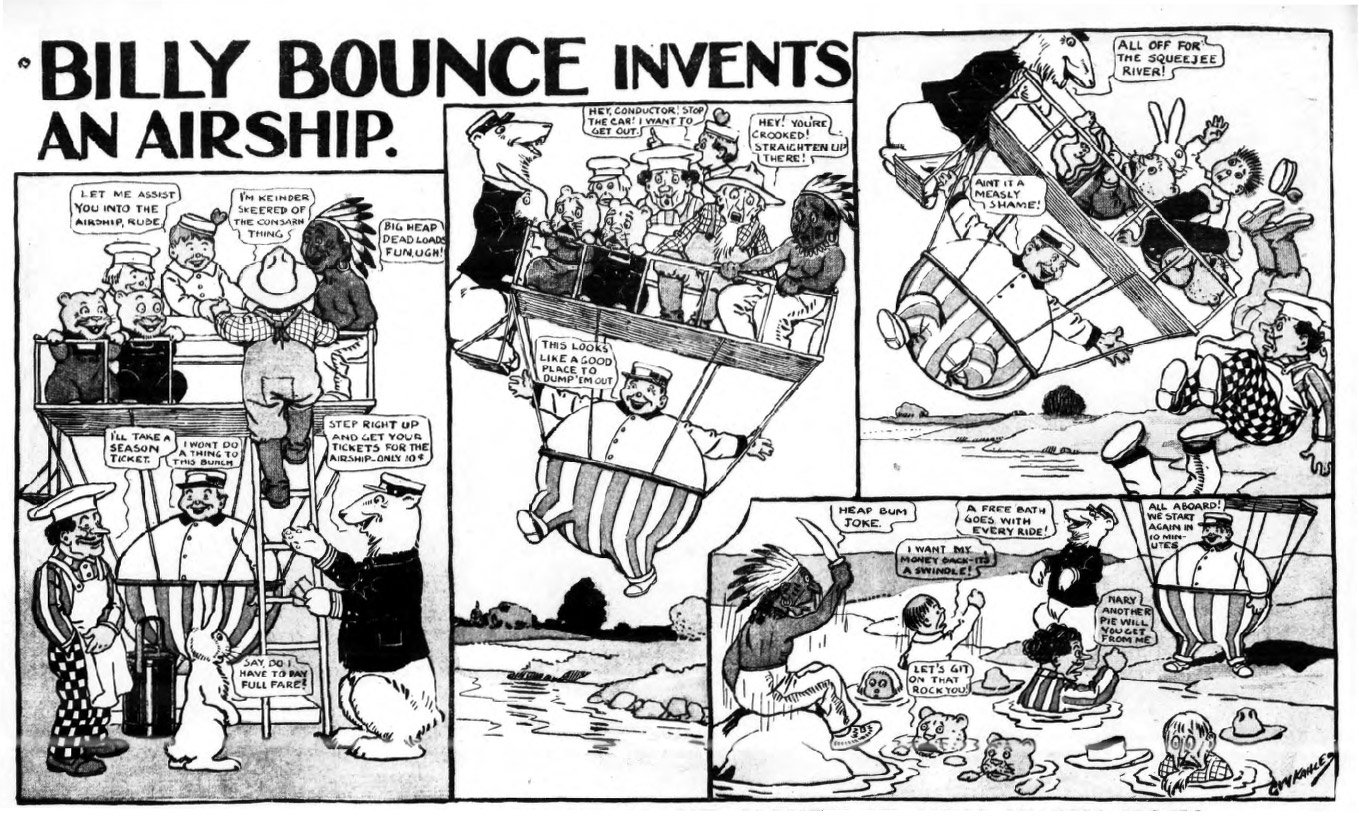
Billy Bounce Invents an Airship. C. W. Kahles' first Billy Bounce comic, October 12, 1902.

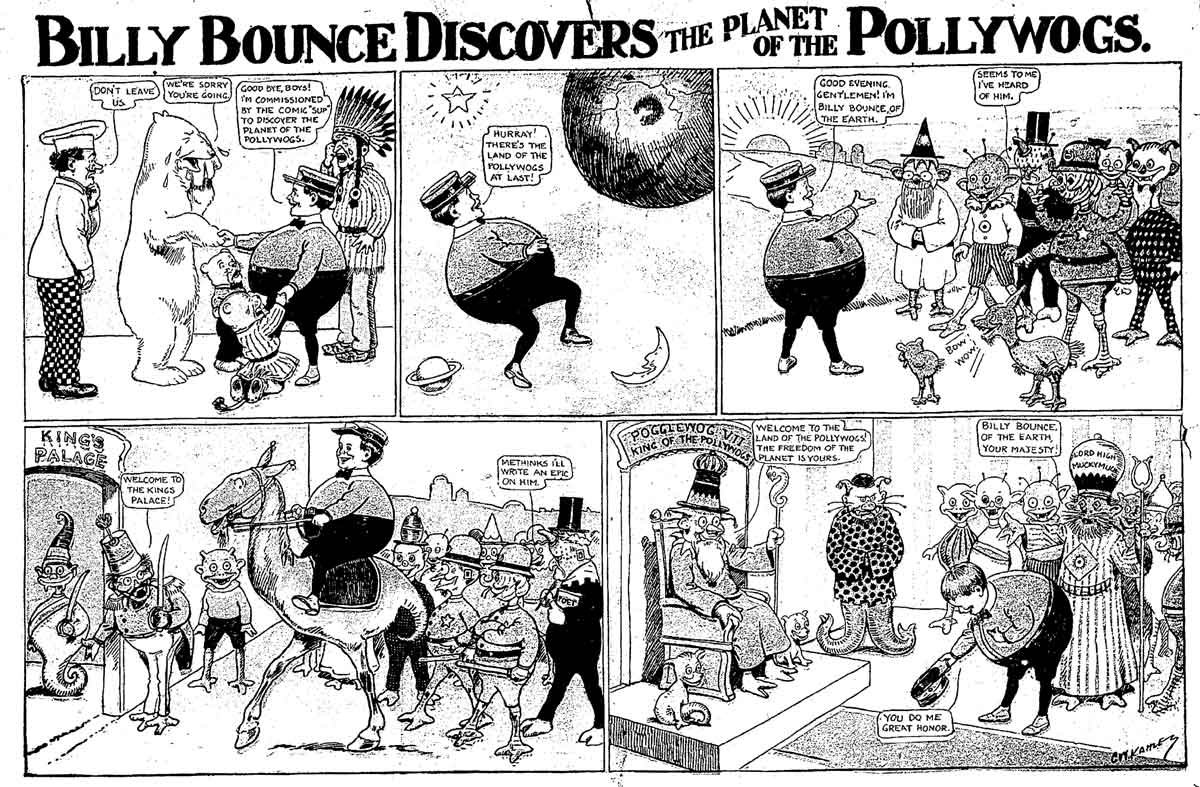
Billy Bounce Discovers the Planet of the Pollywogs, October 9, 1904, reprinted August 1, 1908.

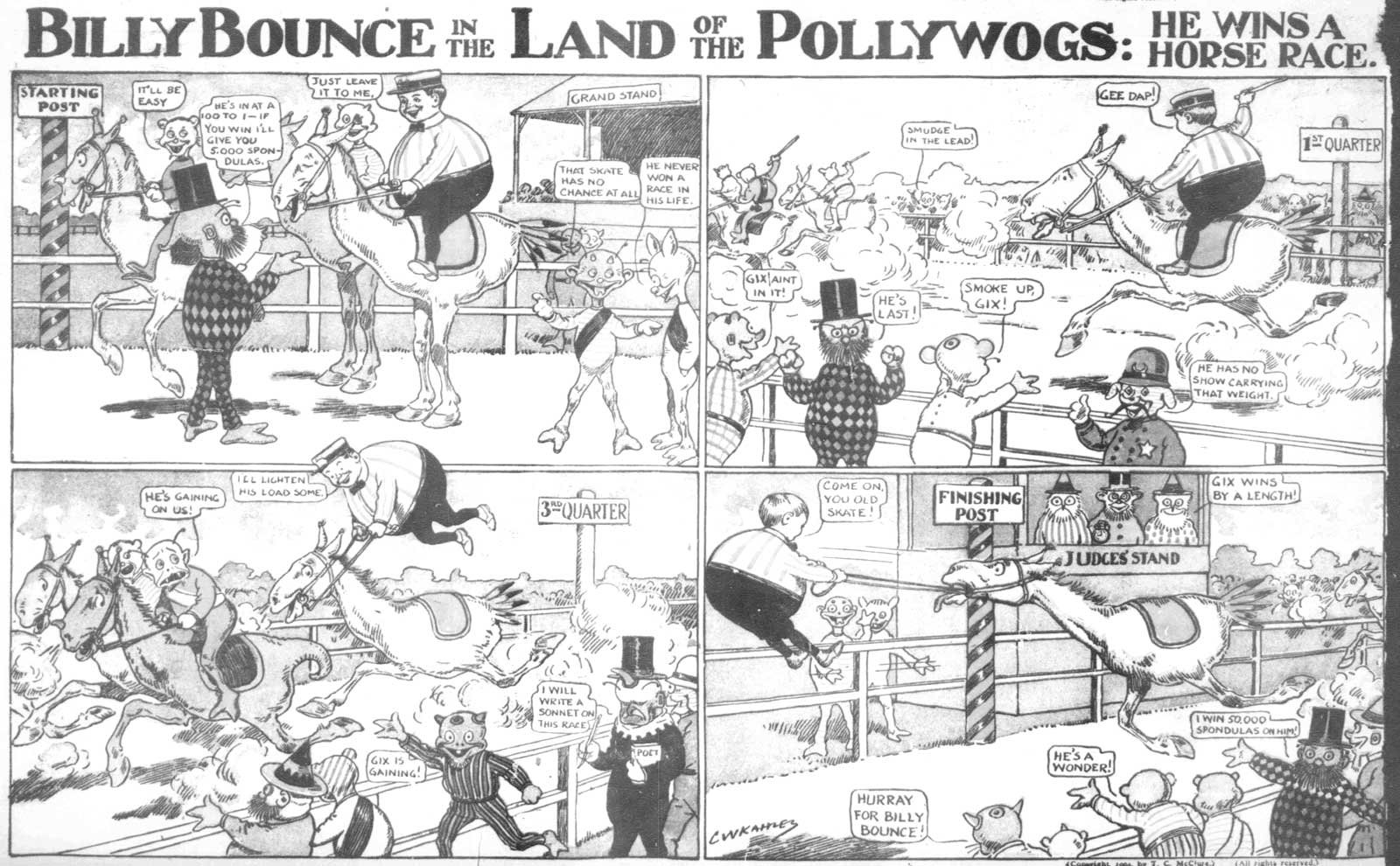
Billy Bounce in the Land of the Pollywogs: He Wins a Horse Race, October 16, 1904.

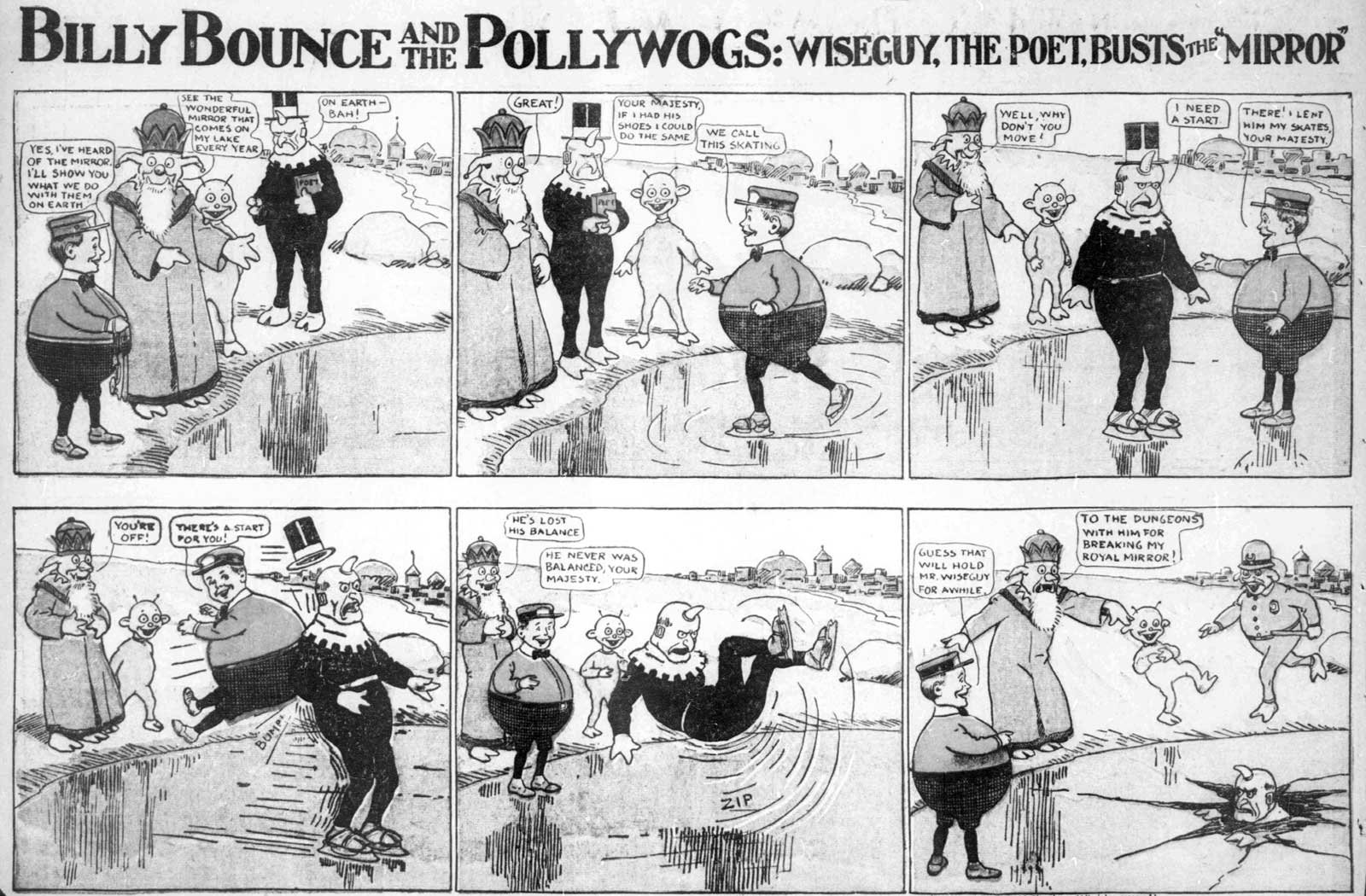
Billy Bounce and the Pollywogs: Wiseguy, the Poet, Busts the Mirror, December 11, 1904, reprinted August 8, 1908.
Illustrations from the Billy Bounce children's book.
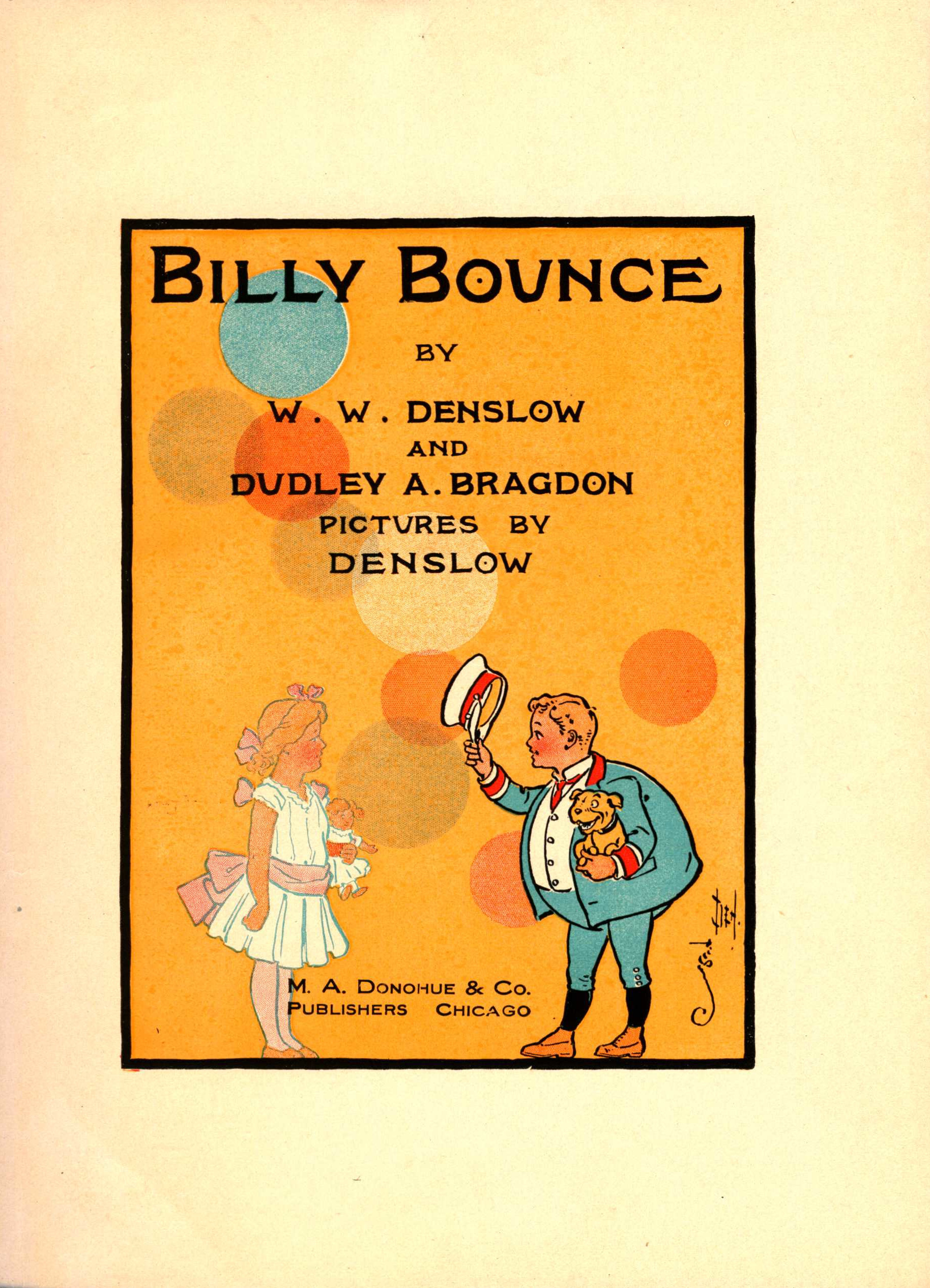
Billy Bounce title page which depicts Billy meeting Princess Honey Girl. Billy is enthralled by her and pledges his allegiance to her and enmity to Bogie Man.

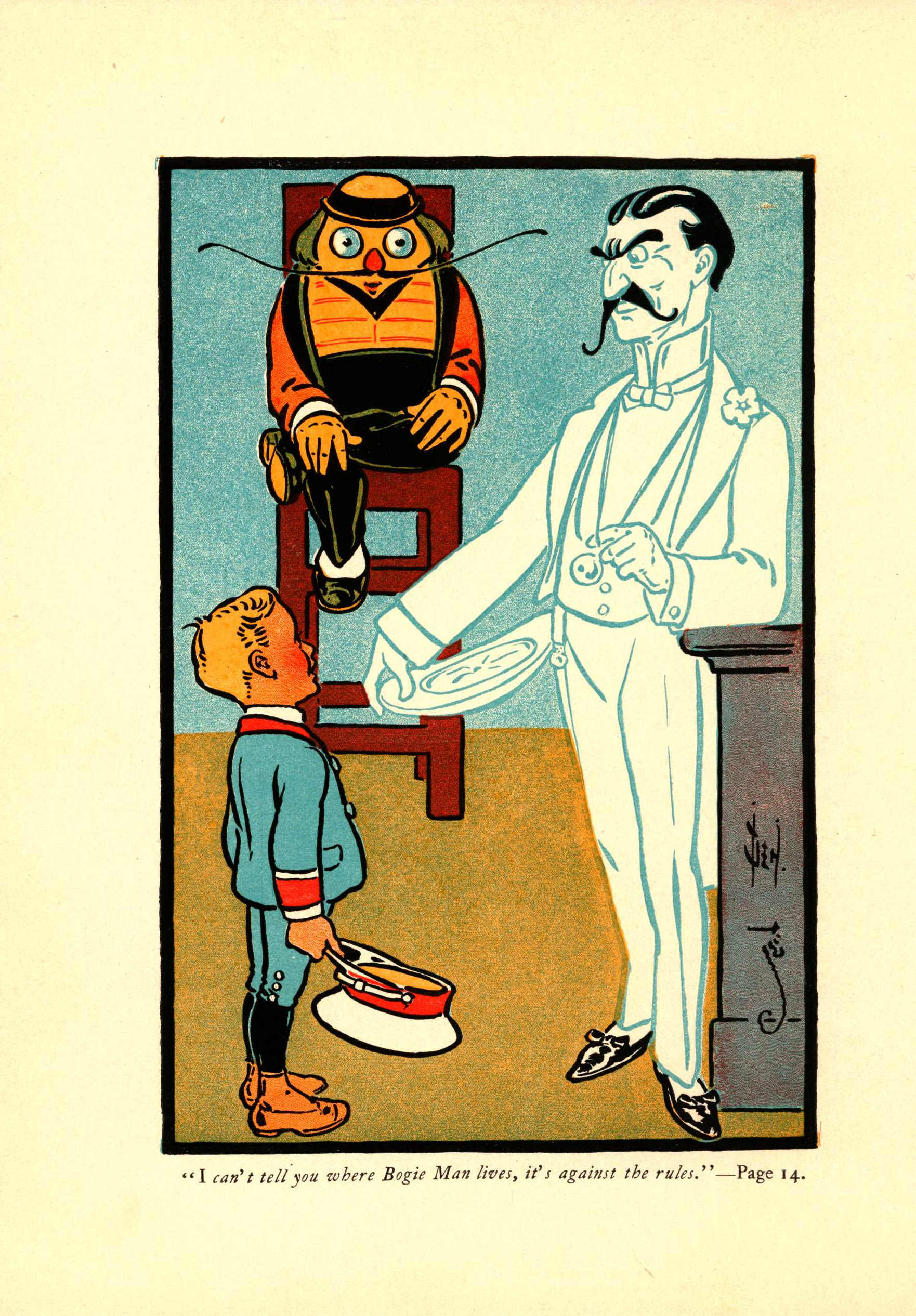
Billy Bounce assigned to deliver a message (without an address) to Bogie Man by the polished villain, Nickel Plate, as assistant villain and traitorous bee, I. B. Bumbus, looks on.

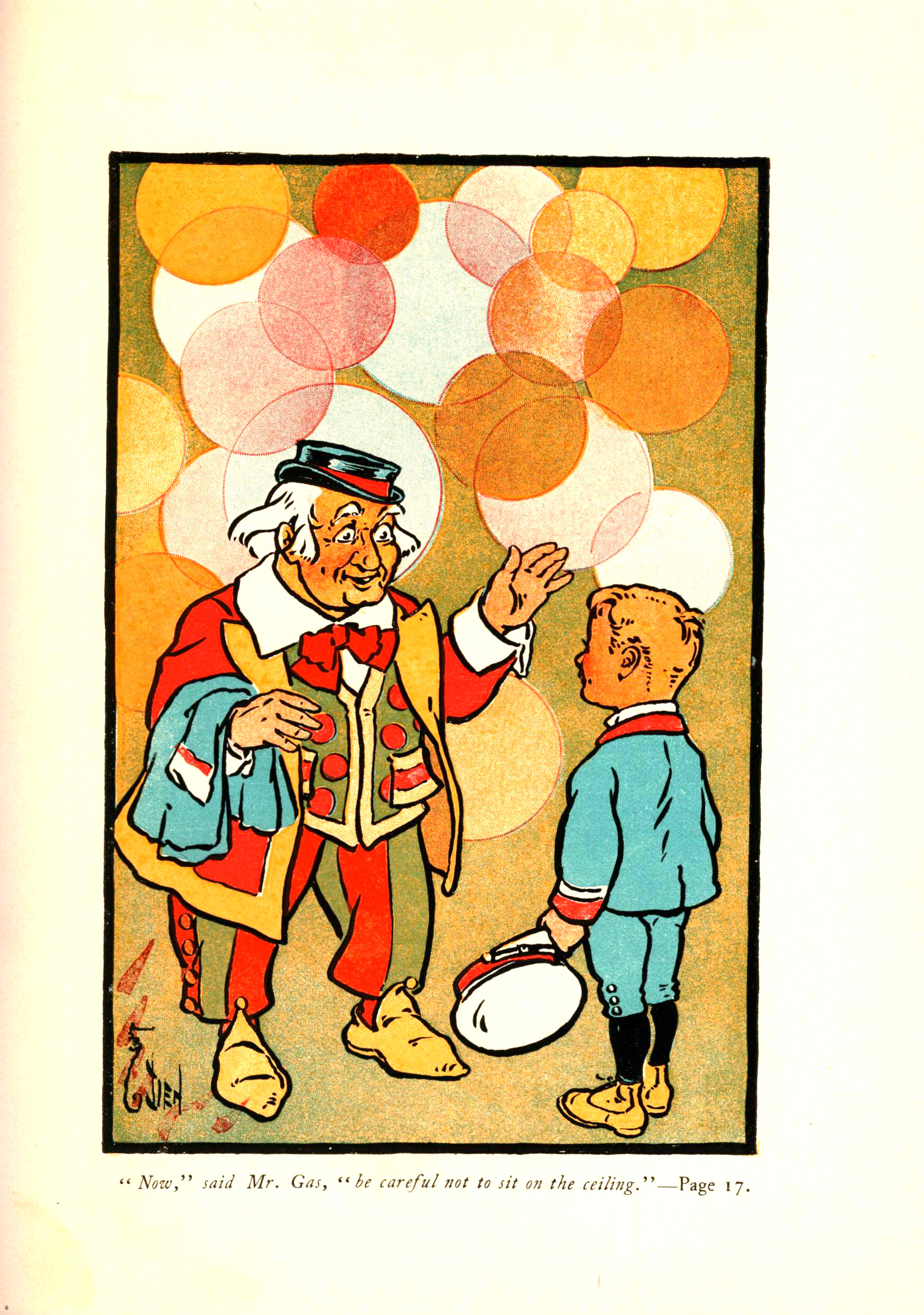
Mr. Gas, Billy Bounce's fairy godfather, gives him a ballon suit that gives Billy the ability to jump great distances.

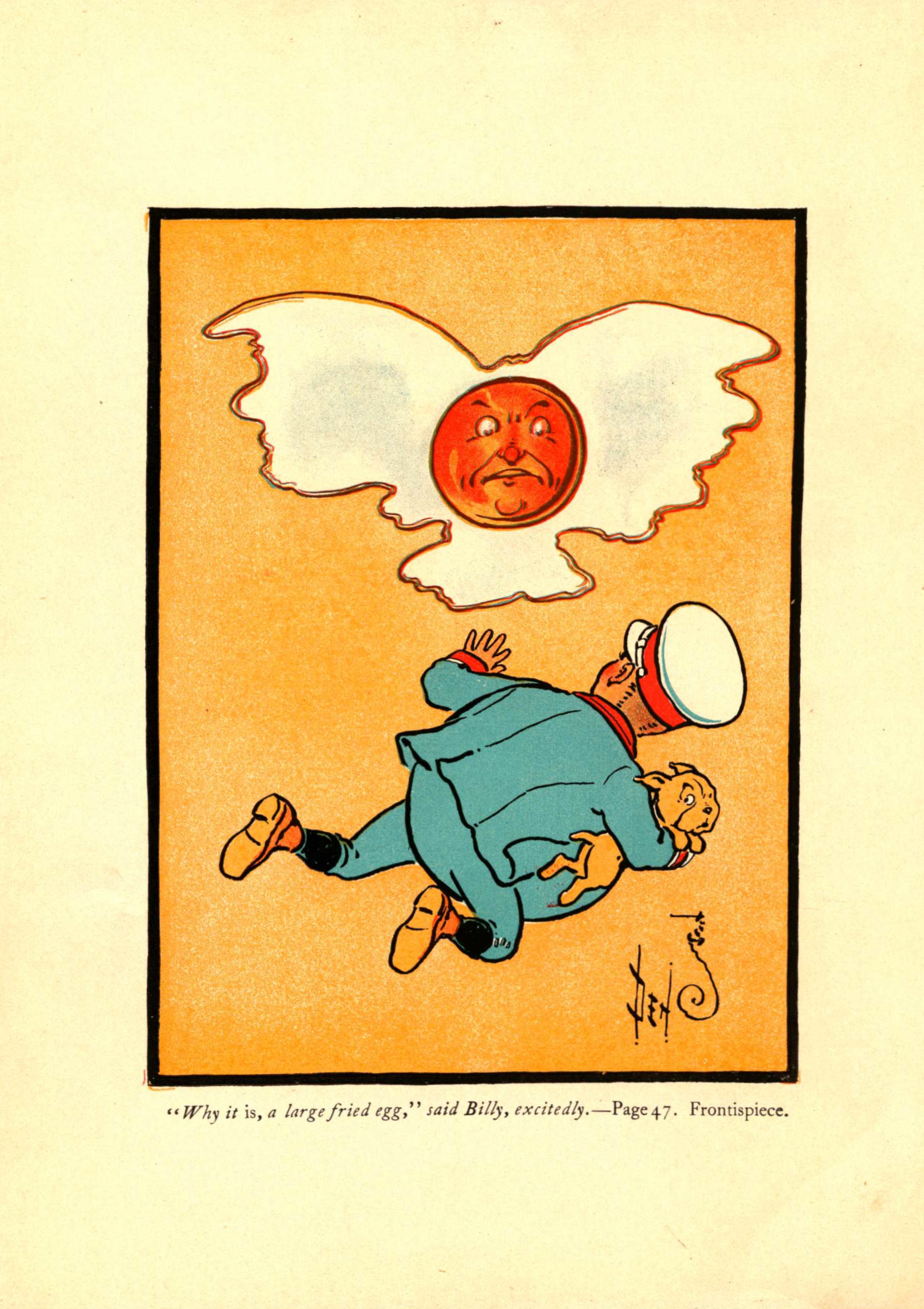
Billy Bounce and his dog, Barker, are captured by White Wings, the flying fried egg, who imprisons him in the town of Eggs–Aggeration.

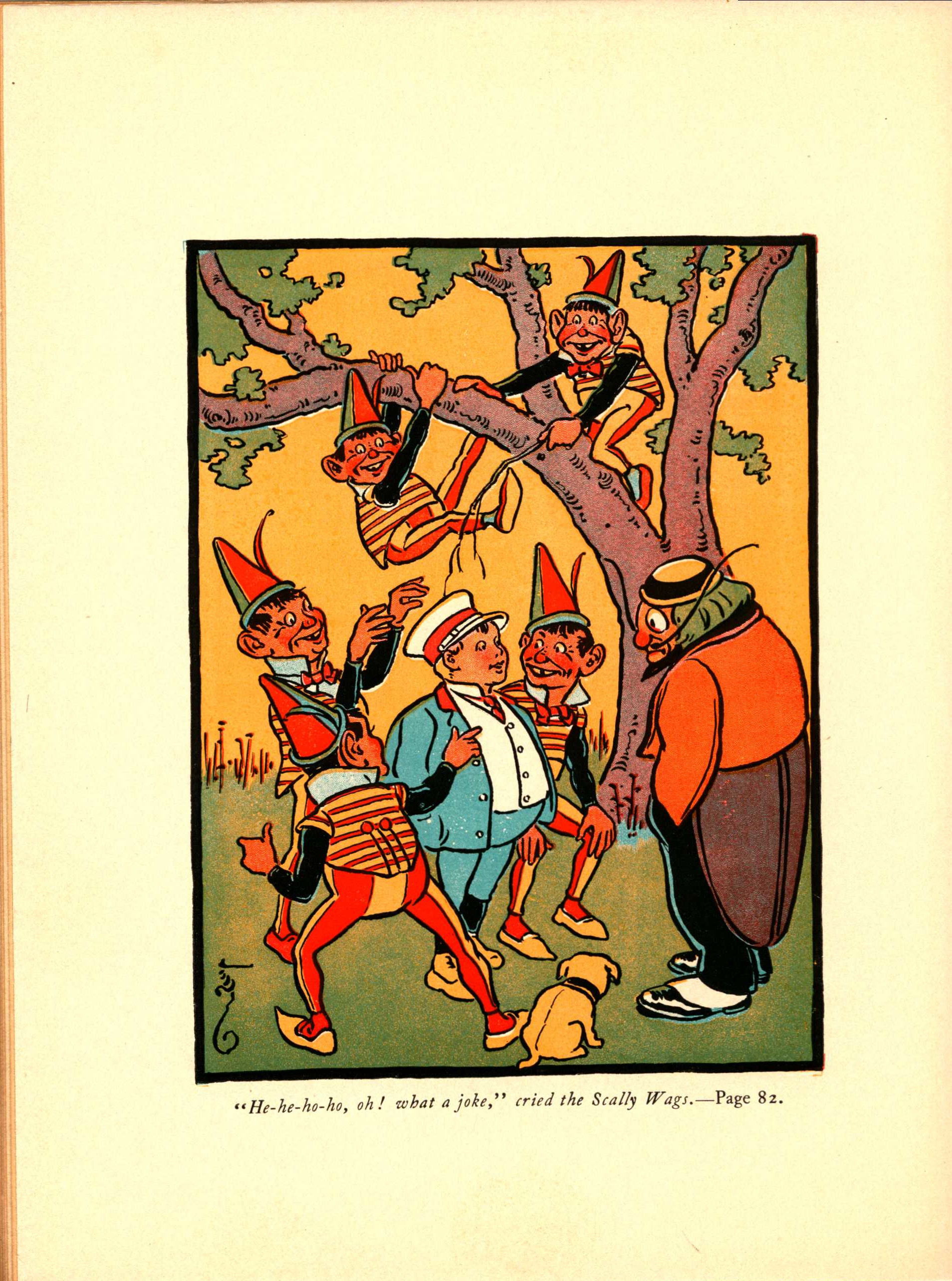
Bumbus (now Billy Bounce's enemy) and Scally Wags, attempt to intimidate Billy Bounce to get the message to Bogie Man back.

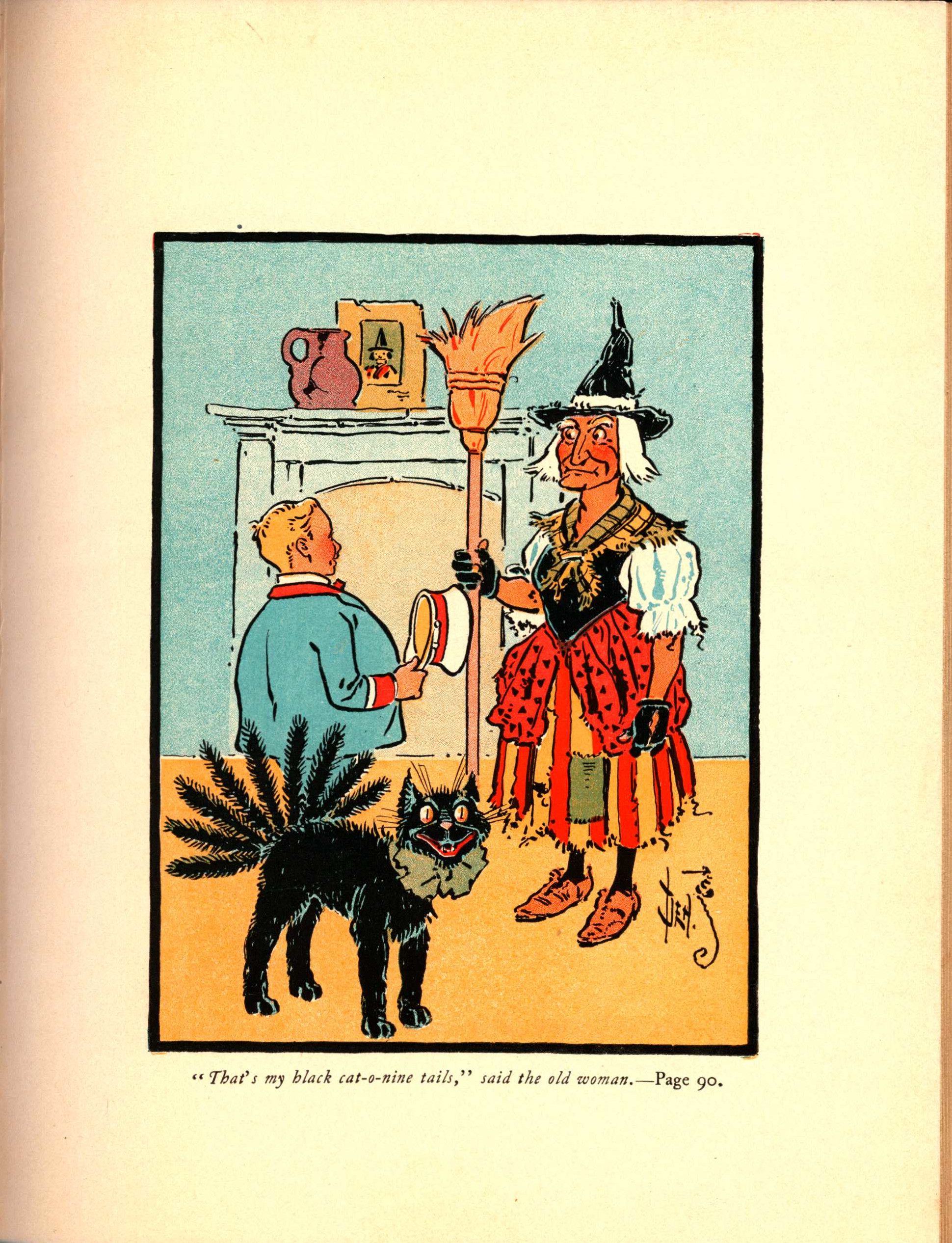
Billy Bounce meets the Was (not a witch she says) and her very unlucky cat o' nine tails in Superstitionburg.

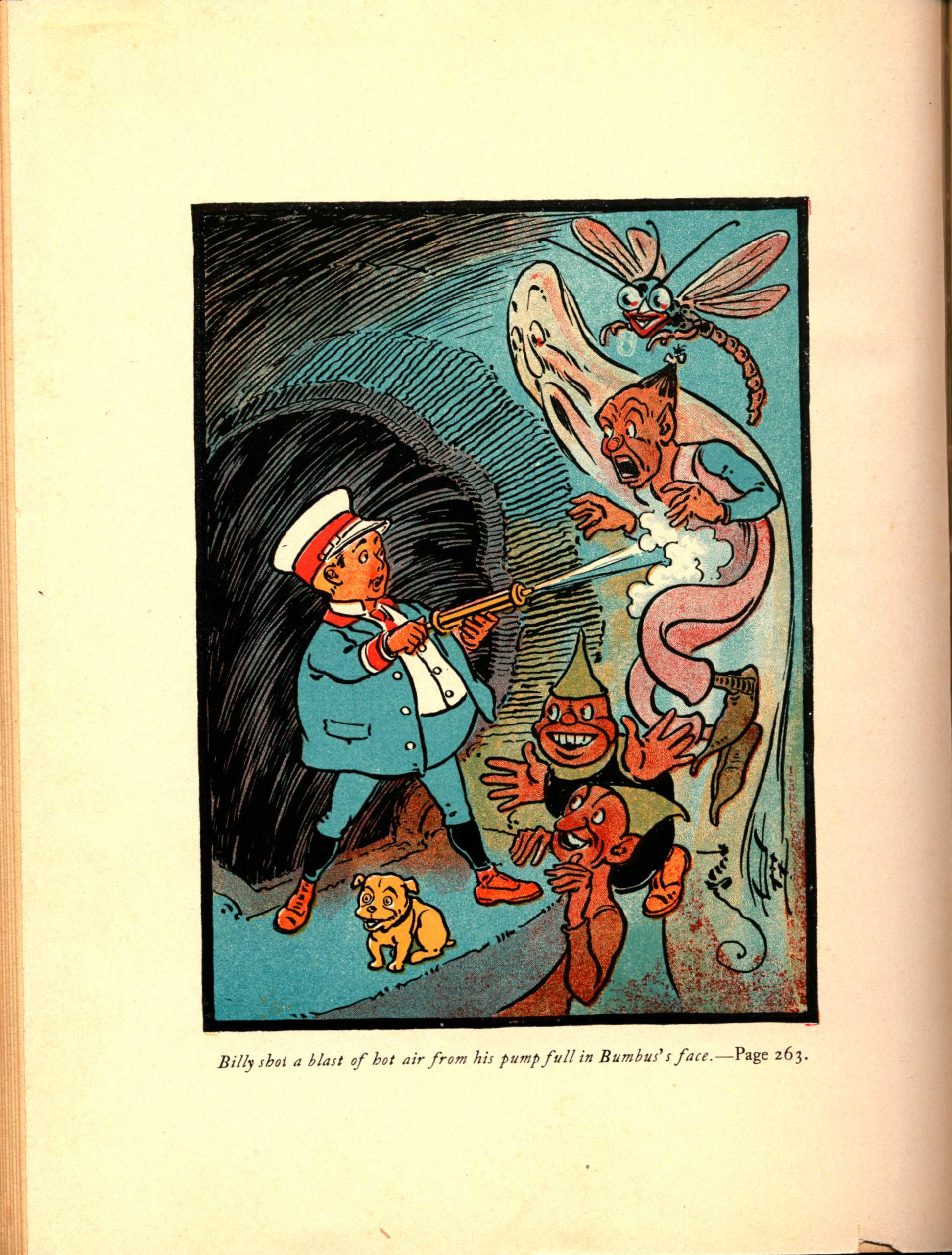
Billy Bounce uses his air pump to fend off all the weird and wicked things that claim Bogie Man as their King.

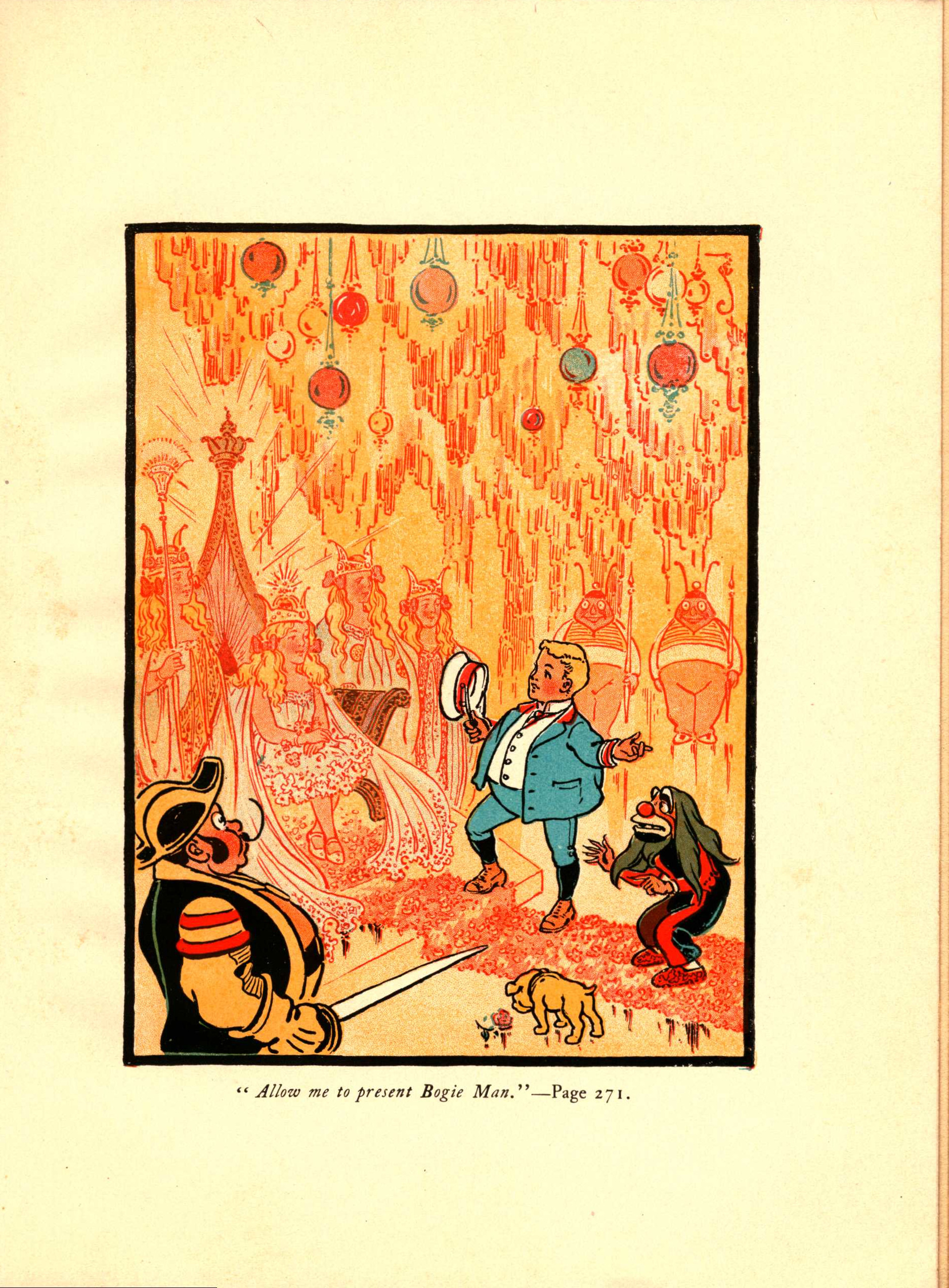
Billy Bounce presents the vanquished Bogie Man to Honey Girl (now Queen) in her dazzlingly palace.
