= McClure Newspaper Syndicate =

First American newspaper syndicate

- Formerly: T. C. McClure Syndicate
- Type: Subsidiary
- Industry: Print syndication
- Founded: 1884; 142 years ago
- Founder: Samuel S. McClure
- Defunct: September 1952; 74 years ago
- Fate: absorbed into Bell Syndicate
- Headquarters: 75 West Street (1930s), New York City, New York, U.S.
- Area served: United States
- Key people: John Sanborn Phillips, Henry Herbert McClure, Robert McClure, Allen Sangree, Adelaide P. Waldo, James L. Lenahan, Ernest Cuneo, Louis Ruppel
- Products: Comic strips, newspaper columns, editorial cartoons
- Owner: Samuel S. McClure (1884–1914); J. C. Brainard (1914–1928); Richard H. Waldo (1928–1946); James L. Lenahan (1946–1952); Bell Syndicate-North American Newspaper Alliance (1952)

In 1943, the McClure Newspaper Syndicate promoted the Batman comic strip with a 12-page booklet.

McClure Newspaper Syndicate, the first American newspaper syndicate, introduced many American and British writers to the masses. Launched in 1884 by publisher Samuel S. McClure, it was the first successful company of its kind. It turned the marketing of comic strips, columns, book serials and other editorial matter into a large industry, and a century later, 300 syndicates were distributing 10,000 features with combined sales of $100 million a year.

== History ==
In 1886, McClure's college friend, John Sanborn Phillips, joined the Syndicate, and his cousin, Henry Herbert McClure, was also on the staff. Samuel McClure's brother, Robert McClure, was in charge of the London office. Allen Sangree had a position with the McClure Syndicate in 1892.

In 1914, the McClure family sold the Syndicate to J. C. Brainard, who acquired the Wheeler Syndicate in 1916. Brainard sold the McClure Syndicate to Richard H. Waldo in 1928. After Waldo died in 1943, his widow, Adelaide P. Waldo, ran the syndicate for three years, passing it on to James L. Lenahan in 1946. Lenahan's failure to meet a due payment on the stock led to a September 1952 auction when it was acquired by Ernest Cuneo, head of the Bell Syndicate-North American Newspaper Alliance group, with Louis Ruppel installed as president and editor.

The company briefly dabbled into comic book production in 1936 under the leadership of Max Gaines, where partnered with Dell Publishing, to produce three of Dell's comic books, The Funnies, Popular Comics and The Comics, and Dell would finance and distribute these comics, until Gaines quit McClure to start All-American Publications in 1939.

== Writers ==
As America's first profitable literary syndicate, the company bought an author's work for about $150 and then sold the right to print it to a newspaper for five dollars. The company lost money during its first few years, eventually turning a profit while distributing and promoting such American luminaries as George Ade, John Kendrick Bangs, William Jennings Bryan, Joel Chandler Harris, William Dean Howells, Fannie Hurst, Sarah Orne Jewett, Jack London, Theodore Roosevelt, Mark Twain and Woodrow Wilson. The roster of British writers included G. K. Chesterton, Arthur Conan Doyle, Rudyard Kipling, Robert Louis Stevenson and H. G. Wells.

== Columnists ==
McClure carried the first "behind the news" column from Washington, along with columns on fashions, interior decorating and international affairs, as well as a column by Calvin Coolidge. In the 1930s, the syndicate distributed a number of "Whirligig" columns: Louis M. Schneider's Financial Whirligig, Frederic Sondern's European Whirligig, Ray Tucker's Washington Whirligig, and National Whirligig (1934–1936).

== Cartoonists ==
One early McClure comic strip artist was Carl Thomas Anderson, who drew Herr Spiegelberger, the Amateur Cracksman beginning in 1903. In 1916, McClure purchased the Wheeler Syndicate from John Neville Wheeler. Another early comic strip artist with McClure was Percy Crosby. Commissioned a second lieutenant in the Officer Reserve Corps in 1916 and being called to active service the following year, Crosby was in training at a camp in Plattsburgh, New York. While in training, Crosby created a daily comic panel, That Rookie from the Thirteenth Squad, for the McClure Syndicate, writing and drawing it from the front in France while serving as a first lieutenant in the 77th Division, AEF. The panel was collected into his first two books, That Rookie of the Thirteenth Squad (1917) and Between Shots (1919). The syndicate also introduced newspaper readers to the art of James Montgomery Flagg and the early cartoons of Clare Victor Dwiggins and Rube Goldberg.

== Editors ==
After employment as a newspaperman in Arizona, California and Hawaii, Harold Matson worked for the McClure Syndicate as a roving correspondent and became managing editor by 1930. Matson later became a literary agent to some of the most illustrious authors in the world.

Sheldon Mayer also joined the Syndicate as an editor in 1936. Some the McClure strips were reprinted during the 1930s in Funnies on Parade. In addition to comic strips and feature articles, McClure also syndicated books and stories. In 1938, Theodore Sturgeon sold his first story to the McClure Syndicate, which bought many of his early, mainstream stories before he became known for his science fiction.

In the late 1930s, the company was located at 75 West Street in New York City.

== McClure comic strips ==
- Alfred by Carl Ryman (October 17, 1949 – 1954) — became part of the Bell-McClure Syndicate
- Archie by Bob Montana (1947–c. 1952)
- Batman and Robin by Bob Kane, Don Cameron, Bill Finger, Jack Schiff, Alvin Schwartz, and Fred Ray (1943–1946)
- Betty by Charles Voight (c. 1919–c.1920) — Sunday-only strip; moved to the New York Herald Tribune Syndicate (where it ran for twenty years)
- Billy Bounce by W. W. Denslow and C. W. Kahles (1901–1906)
- Bobby Thatcher by George Storm (1927–1937)
- Buzz and Snooze by Ken Kling (1918-1919)
- The District School by Clare Victor Dwiggins (Sunday strip, 1914)
- A Dog's Life by Clare Victor Dwiggins (Sunday strip, 1926–1929)
- Foolish Ferdinand by William F. Marriner (December 1901 – 1904)
- Hambone's Meditations by James Pinckney Alley (launched in 1916; soon moved to the Bell Syndicate)
- Herr Spiegelberger, the Amateur Cracksman by Carl Thomas Anderson (1903–c. 1905)
- Home Sweet Home by Harry J. Tuthill (1918–1924)
- Home Wanted for Tags by Clare Victor Dwiggins (1910–1919)
- King Aroo by Jack Kent (1950–1965) — became part of the Bell-McClure Syndicate
- Mary and Her Little Lamb by William F. Marriner (1906–1909)
- Mrs. Bumps Boarding House by Clare Victor Dwiggins (Sunday gag panel, 1913)
- Navy Bob Steele by Wilson Starbuck (1939–1945)
- Noahzark Hotel by Varb (Raoul Barré) (January 12–November 9, 1913)
- O. Henry's Short Stories by John Hix and Bertram Elliott (June 11–July 28, 1928)
- Once Upon a Time by Walter J. Enright (June 1, 1925 – August 5, 1926; reprints until 1929) — printed in some newspapers until the title Make-A-Book
- Ophelia's Slate by Clare Victor Dwiggins (1927–1929)
- Poor Ol' Robinson Crusoe by Everett Lowry (1909–1911) — pre-syndication (launched in 1903) titled Peg Leg Pete and then Barnacle Bill
- Roger Lincoln, S-Man by Milton Luros (1948-1952)
- Sambo and His Funny Noises by William F. Marriner (1905 – 1913)
- School Days by Clare Victor Dwiggins (1917, 1927–1929) — also known as The School Days of Tom Sawyer & Huck Finn
- Strange as It Seems by John Hix (1928–1970) — became part of the Bell-McClure Syndicate
- Superman originally by Jerry Siegel and Joe Shuster (1939–1967) — became part of the Bell-McClure Syndicate
- That Rookie from the Thirteenth Squad by Percy Crosby (c. 1917–c. 1918)
- There Oughta Be a Law! by Al Fagaly and Harry Shorten (later Frank Borth, Warren Whipple and Mort Gerberg) (1944–1984) — strip later moved to United Feature Syndicate
- Tom Sawyer and Huck Finn by Clare Victor Dwiggins (Daily/Sunday, 1918–1931))
- Uncle Jim and Tad and Tim by Clare Victor Dwiggins (Sunday gag panel, 1913–1914)
- Young Frank Merriwell by Gilbert Patten and John Hix (March 26–September 28, 1928)
