= Wilson Starbuck =

Mr. Starbuck

Wilson Starbuck (December 25, 1897 – December 27, 1983) was an American writer, sailor, and United States Navy officer known for his written works involving life at sea. He is best known for creating the World War II comic strip Navy Bob Steele which was published by the McClure Newspaper Syndicate from 1939 to 1945, and for his play Sea Dogs which was staged on Broadway in 1939.

== Life and career ==
Wilson Starbuck was born in Newark, New Jersey, on December 25, 1897. He served as a lieutenant in the United States Navy during World War I, and also worked as a sailor aboard a freighter. His experiences at sea informed his writing. He penned the children's book Liners and Freighters (1934, Thomas Nelson & Sons) which included a collection of short stories aimed at educating middle school students about commerce and transportation at sea. Similar non-fiction books for children in the Our Changing World book series followed including Down the Ship's Ways (1935, Thomas Nelson & Sons) and Flash-Flash-Flash: About Lightships and Lighthouses (1937, Thomas Nelson & Sons).

Starbuck's melodrama Sea Dogs premiered on Broadway at Maxine Elliott's Theatre's on November 6, 1939. Set aboard a freighter at sea, the play starred the actor Joseph Macauley as an abusive alcoholic captain involved in dope smuggling who is pitted against a young crewman who threatens to expose his illegal enterprise. The play was deemed exceptional by The New York Times in its authenticity of scene and characters, pulling from Starbuck's own experience working on the crew of a freighter, but was otherwise criticized by the paper as not going beyond authenticity to create a compelling drama. Theatre historian Gerald Bordman noted that the play was unusual in that it "contained some of the foulest language heard" on the Broadway stage up until that point in history.

Starbuck created the comic strip Navy Bob Steele; one of several comics featuring military servicemen created during World War II. He created the comic strip with the intent of supporting President Franklin D. Roosevelt's policy and campaign for American military preparedness. With Erwin Greenwood as his comic strip artist, he successfully sold the comic strip to McClure Newspaper Syndicate who began publishing the strip in their newspapers nationally on November 9, 1939. The comic strip fared well. On the day of the Attack on Pearl Harbor the Navy Bob Steele strip on that day featured the character aboard an American destroyer attempting a heroic rescue at sea. After this event, the strip featured Bob Steele fighting in the Pacific War.

Navy Bob Steele suffered some after Starbuck re-enlisted in the United States Navy with the rank of commander, and his attentions were more rushed on the comic strip. It further declined in quality when Erwin Greenwood, a reliable if un-original artist, was replaced in 1944 by William King who lacked a consistent style. As the war came to an end, the relevance of the strip diminished, and it ceased publication in the summer of 1945.

Starbuck died on December 27, 1983, in Bala Cynwyd, Pennsylvania. He is buried in West Laurel Hill Cemetery.
