= Strange as It Seems =

American comic strip (1928–1970)

Strange as It Seems appeared as a syndicated cartoon feature published from 1928 to 1970, and became a familiar brand to millions around the globe for its comic strips, books, radio shows and film shorts. Created by John Hix, Strange as It Seems was distinguished for its adherence to Hix's standard that every published fact be verified by a minimum of three sources. In Hix's words, Strange as It Seems is a library of "the curious, in nature and humankind, set adrift on the vast sea of public opinion with the hope that it will fulfill its mission to entertain and acquaint its viewers with some of the marvels of the world in which we live."

== Syndicated comic strip ==
Strange as It Seems
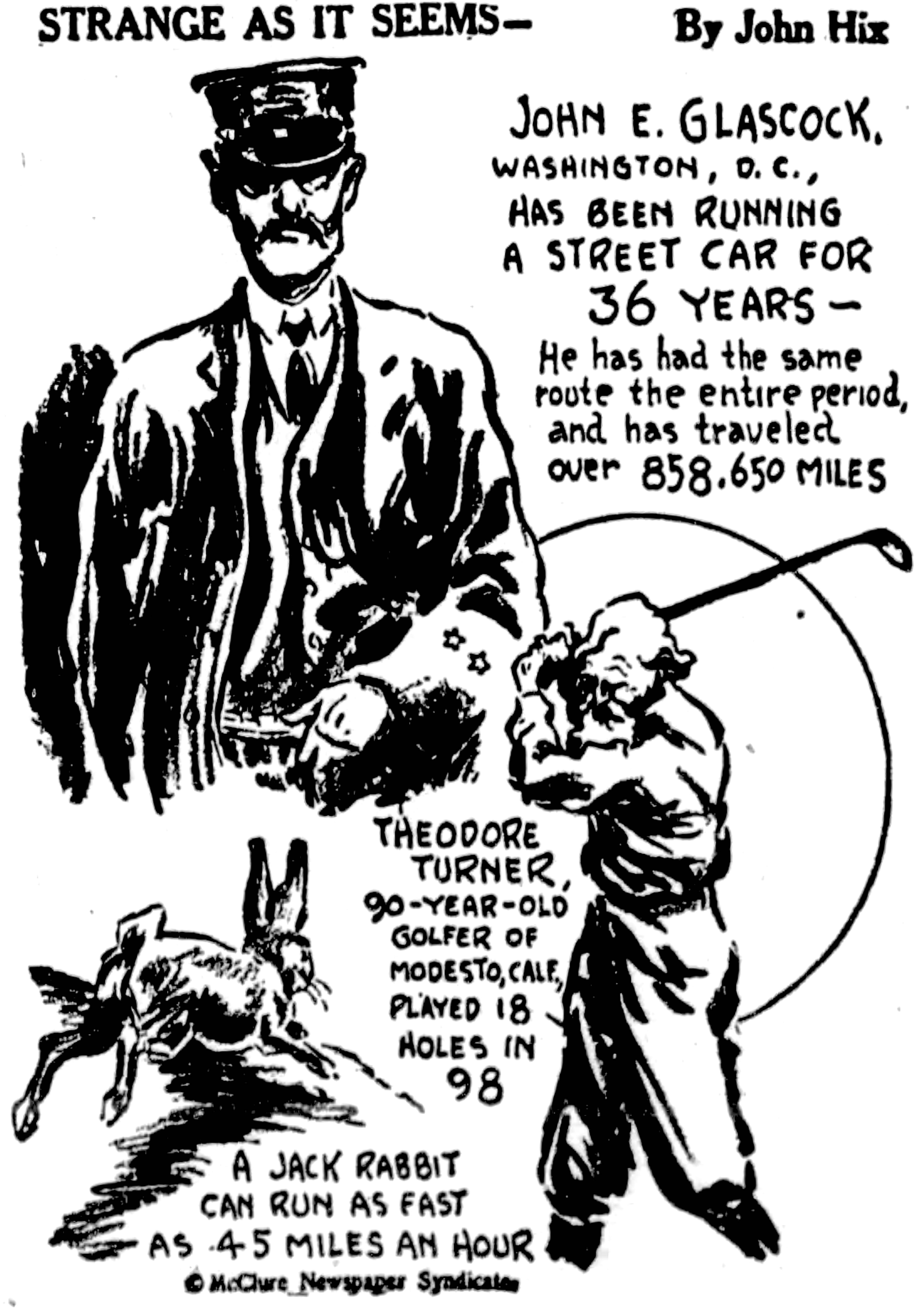
- The debut comic strip, March 26, 1928
- Author: John Hix (1928–1944); Ernest Hix (1944–1948); Elsie Huber Hix (1948–1963); Ernest Hix, Jr. & Phyllis Hix (1963–1970)
- Illustrator(s): John Hix (1928–1944); Dick Kirby (1944–1946, 1948–1949); Doug Heyes (1946–1948); George Jahns (1949–1970)
- Current status/schedule: Discontinued
- Launch date: 1928
- End date: 1970
- Syndicate(s): (domestically) McClure Newspaper Syndicate (internationally) United Press International
- Genre: Bizarre facts

The Strange as It Seems syndicated comic strips were printed daily in newspapers from 1928 to 1970. They were originally created by John Hix. Strange as It Seems was distinguished for its adherence to Hix's standard that every published fact be verified by a minimum of three sources.

It was syndicated domestically by McClure Newspaper Syndicate and internationally by United Press International. At its peak, the strip was printed in 1,300 newspapers. The cartoons competed in newspapers with Ripley's Believe It or Not! cartoons. Other similar strips at the time included Ralph Graczak's Our Own Oddities and It Happened in Canada by Gordon Johnston.

By 1953, the strip's syndication was down to 175 newspapers. The demise of multiple newspapers in cities and the changing taste of readers led to the strip ending in 1970.

The cartoon strip was written and drawn by John Hix from 1928 until his health began to deteriorate in the early 1940s and Dick Kirby began drawing the strip, although Hix continued to oversee and approve all content.

John Hix died of myocarditis on June 6, 1944 (which was also D-Day). His brother, Ernest Hix, took over producing the feature. The cartoons were drawn by Dick Kirby from 1944 to 1946, then by Doug Heyes from 1946 to 1948. After Ernest Hix's death in the crash of a private plane on September 18, 1948, in Los Angeles, the writing of the strip was taken over by his wife Elsie Huber Hix. Ms. Hix had two young children at the time, Ernest Harmon Hix Jr. and Dixie Ann Hix. Dick Kirby returned to draw the strip from 1948 until 1949, then George Jahns took over and continued as the feature's artist until 1970 when the strip was discontinued. Ms. Hix continued to write the stories for the comics until 1963, when she turned the work over to her son, Ernest Hix Jr. He wrote and produced the strip with his wife Phyllis until 1970 when the feature went out of syndication.

== Radio show ==
Strange as It Seems was a radio program of strange and unusual tales about fantastic people and events, based on the daily syndicated newspaper cartoon panels of John Hix of the same name. Strange as It Seems began as a 15-minute radio program on March 22, 1935. It was broadcast over the Columbia – Don Lee Coast radio network. The schedule was 3 nights a week - Sunday, Wednesday and Friday at 7:45 PM (6:45 during summer daylight saving time). The sponsor was Ex‐Lax. In late September 1935 the show changed to two shows per week, dropping the Sunday show. In late September 1936 the schedule changed again to Tuesday and Friday nights. A 1936 booklet of the Strange as It Seems stories was sponsored by Ex-Lax and given away as a free promotion of the radio program by writing to the station. The show was hosted by Gayne Whitman, produced and directed by Cyril Armbrister and the music was composed and directed by Felix Mills. Whitman had been the announcer on the Strange as It Seems movie shorts from 1930 to 1934. The programs included two or three segments of dramatized events in mini plays with dramatic, fanfare music interspersed in the show between segments. After the opening line, an Ex-Lax commercial would follow. Then two or three strange stories would be presented. The show would conclude with a preview of the next show's stories, an Ex-Lax commercial, a strange fact of trivia, such as "butterflies smell with their feet" and finally a short musical ending. There were occasionally live interviews with unusual personalities, such as the World's Fastest Talker. Many of the programs were distributed on 16" 33 RPM records with one 15 minute show on each side. Many sources list at least 39 of these records with a total of 78 programs recorded. This run of the shows concluded at the end of January 1937, after over 210 shows. The show began again in January 1938 as a 15-minute once a week program, airing on Sunday afternoons at 3:00 (2:00 during daylight saving time). The show ended at the end of December 1938, with 53 shows in this run.

The Strange as It Seems radio program was picked up as a 30-minute network program on the Columbia Broadcasting System from August 17, 1939, to December 26, 1940, on Thursdays at 8:30 P.M. (7:30 P.M. during the summer daylight saving time). There were 72 of these half-hour broadcasts. The sponsor was Palmolive Shave Cream and the host was Alois Havrilla. Havrilla was the announcer on the Stranger Than Fiction movie shorts beginning in 1934 and continuing in that role until the shorts were ended in 1942. Stranger Than Fiction was the successor to the Strange as It Seems movie shorts that ran from 1930 until 1934.

The program had one final run in its original 15 minute format from Nov. 10, 1946 to April 13, 1947, airing at 7:30 PM on Sunday nights. There were 22 episodes aired in this run. In the newspaper story about the death of John Hix on June 6, 1944, Ernest Hix stated there were over 600 radio programs produced, indicating there were other shows than those so far identified.

=== Gayne Whitman (announcer, 1935–1939) ===
Alfred Vosburgh was born March 19, 1890, in Chicago, Illinois. He first used the stage name of Alfred Whitman when he began acting in silent films in 1917. He later used the stage name Gayne Whitman, beginning in 1925. He was an American radio and film actor. On radio, he played the title role in Chandu the Magician and was an announcer on other programs. He appeared in 213 films between 1904 and 1957. His wife was the former Estelle Allen. Whitman died on August 31, 1958, in Los Angeles, California, of a heart attack.

=== Gordon "Felix" Mills (musical director, 1935–1939) ===
Gordon 'Felix' Mills was born on July 28, 1901, in Fort Collins, Colorado. He was a highly successful composer-arranger-conductor during the Golden Age of Radio in the 1930s and 1940s. He was the musical director for The Mickey Mouse Theater of the Air, a Disney radio show of the 1930s. Mills created a "gadget band" with wild instruments for Donald Duck to direct on some episodes.

He was also the musical director for CBS Radio's Silver Theater from 1937 to 1947. Choosing to retire rather than fire a few band members during the Red Inquisition, he built a home in Morro Bay, California to pursue his favorite hobbies, sailing and slide photography. Mills died on April 5, 1987, at Morro Bay, California.

=== Cyril Armbrister (producer and director, 1935–1939) ===
Cyril Edward Armbrister was born on Cat Island, Bahamas on August 24, 1896. His ancestors had been British loyalists during the Revolutionary War and immigrated to the Bahamas in the late 1700s. His father, William Armbrister, married for a second time at the age of 76 to Eugenie Bode and Cyril was born of this marriage. His father died when Cyril was 12 and he and his mother moved to Canada. Cyril was educated in England and was a captain in the Canadian Militia during World War I. He later moved to Hollywood and became a director. He directed Chandu the Magician, Terry and the Pirates, and Land of the Lost, among other radio programs. He married the actress Frances Fintel and they split their time between California and the family plantation on Cat Island, Bahamas. Cyril's son Tony developed the family plantation into the resort, Fernandez Bay. Cyril died on September 18, 1966, in Nassau, Bahamas.

=== Alois Havrilla (announcer, 1939‐1940) ===
Alois Havrilla was born June 7, 1891, in Presov, Slovakia. He arrived in the United States as a small child, speaking no English. He worked hard to perfect his English. He began his radio career as a baritone singer. In 1921, he recorded, "Tancuj, Tancuj", a well-known Slovak folk song. He then worked as an announcer on the Palmolive Hour on NBC from 1927 to 1931. He also worked as an announcer on several other radio programs, including The Jack Benny Program in 1934–1935 and the Paul Whiteman radio program. In 1935, he received an award from the American Academy of Arts and Letters, the prestigious Medal for Good Diction and was named as the country's best radio announcer. He also worked as a narrator for Universal, Paramount Pictorial and Pathe Motion Picture Studios. Havrilla worked at a number of New York-area radio stations as a news commentator, announcer, narrator, and host of musical programs. He died on December 7, 1952, in Englewood, New Jersey.

== Film shorts ==
Warner Brothers released a series of short films beginning in May 1930 based on Robert Ripley's Ripley's Believe It or Not! cartoon series. Universal Studios responded by signing John Hix to a contract to create short films based on his cartoon strip Strange as It Seems. There were 39 short subjects released between August 22, 1930, and May 5, 1934, coming out on average about once per month. The films were produced by Jerry Fairbanks & Manny Nathan, scripted by John Hix and narrated by Gayne Whitman. The first 21 released in 1930 were produced in Multicolor. Beginning in September, 1932, the remaining 17 shorts were filmed in Black & White. The shorts played in over 6,000 movie theaters. When Jerry Fairbanks left Universal for rival Paramount (starting their Popular Science films), his Strange as It Seems series was taken over by the Universal Studios newsreel staff with Thomas Mead and Joseph O'Brien in charge and renamed Stranger Than Fiction. The first of these films was released on June 28, 1934, and came out about every 2 to 3 weeks. They were also filmed in black and white and were directed by Charles E. Ford and narrated by Alois Havrilla & James Wallington. Beginning on Sept. 18, 1940, the films were directed by Henry Clay Bate and narrated by Alois Havrilla. The last of the Stranger Than Fiction short films was released on August 31, 1942, for a total of 110 Stranger Than Fiction short films and a total of 149 short films, including the Stranger than Fiction series. Columbia Studios brought back the Strange as It Seems shorts in 1937. CBS bundled 8 of these shorts in a package to their television affiliates in 1949.

== Books ==
The first Strange as It Seems book was published in 1931 and reprinted many of the cartoons from the three-year run of the newspaper feature. In December 1936, Eastern Color Printing published the John Hix Scrapbook. In 1937, Eastern released a second volume.

There was also a hardback written by Elsie Huber Hix in 1945 and a follow-up paperback. Each sold over 500,000 copies. She published two more paperbacks, with the final one published in 1962.

== Comic books ==
Comic books were a natural medium for these cartoons. The first of these comic books appeared in 1932. Promotional comic books were created for Ex-Lax (as a promotional giveaway on the radio program they sponsored) and United Airlines (as a handout for passengers to read on the flights). A series of comics began in 1939, with issues 2 – 9 being published.

== Exhibitions ==
The California Pacific International Exposition in San Diego opened in May 1935. But by that fall, the promoters knew they needed to make changes. Areas like Gold Gulch (a replica of an 1849 Gold Rush town) and the Zoro Garden Nudist Colony were getting out of hand and generating bad publicity while the Ripley's Believe It or Not! exhibit was deemed to be too gruesome, so the exhibitors contacted Ernest and John Hix about opening their own exhibit to replace Ripley's in the 1936 season of the fair. Their exhibit opened in February 1936 and was very popular. John Hix drew from his large collection of oddities for the Exhibition in the large building in the center of the Fun Zone. Then in 1939, the Hix brothers aced out Robert Ripley for an exhibition at the 1939 New York World's Fair. Ripley responded with his own exhibition near the Fair and named it Ripley's Believe It Or Not Odditorrium. A series of the Odditoriums would eventually be created around the world. A 1938 newspaper article described the groundbreaking of the exhibit at the World's Fair "61 Year old Shovel. Auspiciously performing groundbreaking ceremonies for the John Hix "Strange as It Seems" show at the New York World's Fairground on December 30, 1938, Grover Whalen, President of the Fair, used a shovel invented 61 years before – on April 16, 1878 – by G. B. DeForest, embodying construction principles still in use. Betty Broadbent was one of the persons at the Hix's attraction. Her body was covered almost entirely with over 450 tattoos.

== Archives ==
The Strange as It Seems archives are maintained by Jeff Hix, grandnephew of John Hix and the son of Ernest Harmon Hix Jr. and are currently being digitized by HistoriVision, LLC. to be made available to the public for reference as well as for use in the Strange as It Seems productions currently published on their website and YouTube channel. According to the Strange as It Seems website, the archives are a "40 year treasure trove of fascinating letters and photos from the world over confirming the strange and unusual stories in sports, science, popular culture, history and nature delivered daily to its faithful readership throughout the 1930s, 40s, 50s & 60s."

== Ripley vs. Hix ==
Robert Ripley of Ripley's Believe It or Not! and John Hix of Strange as It Seems competed on many media fronts in acquiring and accumulating the most original and strange facts for their projects. There was always a friendly rivalry between Ripley and Hix in their various media offerings:

- Robert Ripley was 16 years older than John Hix so he had a head start based on his age.
- In 1918, Robert Ripley began publishing his cartoons in newspapers. John Hix began nationally syndicating his newspaper cartoons in 1928, ten years later.
- In April 1930, Ripley aired his first radio show; Hix started his Strange as It Seems radio program in March, 1935.
- In May 1930, Ripley released his first movie shorts through Paramount Studios. Three months later in August 1930, Hix released his first film shorts through Universal Studios.
- Ripley was selected for an exhibit at the California Pacific International Exposition in 1935. Hix replaced him with an exhibit at the show in 1936.
- And in 1939, Hix scooped Ripley for an exhibit at the New York World's Fair. Ripley countered by opening the first of his Ripley's Odditoriums a few blocks from the fair.

They also competed in book and comic book publishing as well.

== Hix family ==
=== John Hix ===
John Hix
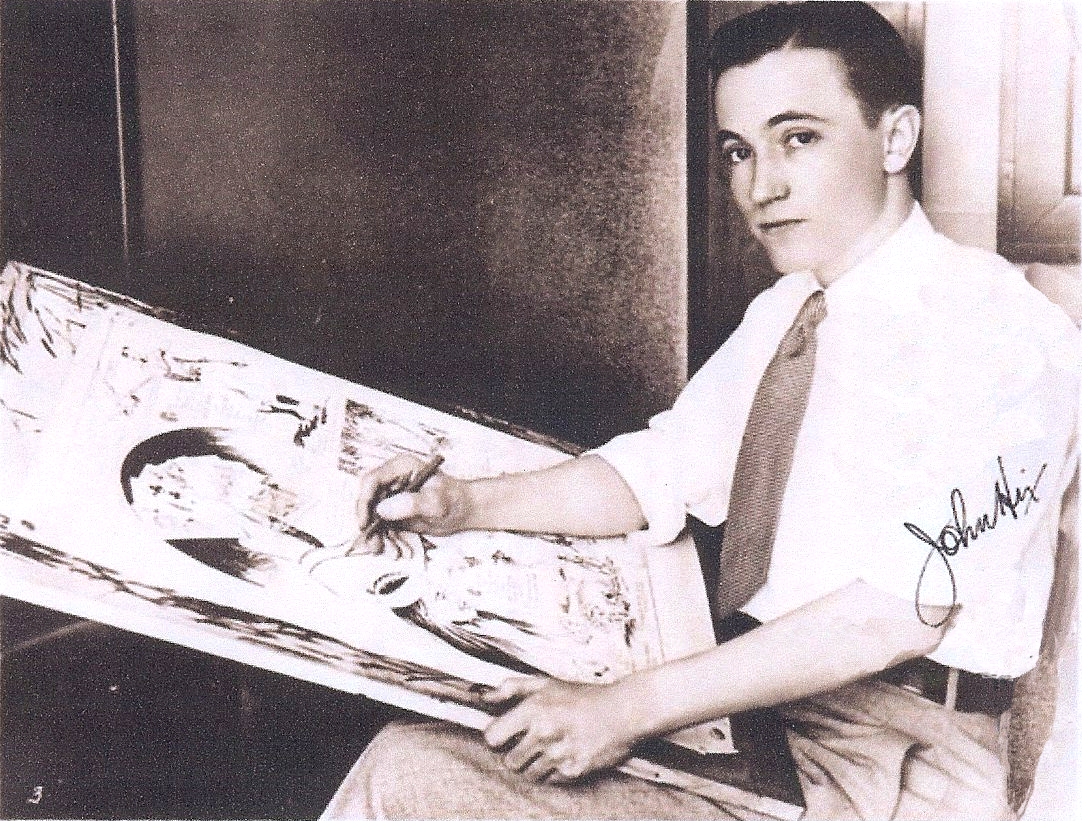
- John Hix
- Born: John McCary Hix; June 17, 1907 Huntsville, Alabama, U.S.
- Died: June 6, 1944 (aged 36) Los Angeles, California
- Area: Cartoonist
- Notable works: Strange as It Seems

John McCary Hix was born on June 17, 1907, in Huntsville, Alabama, to John Harmon Hix and Viola Ann McCary Hix. His brother Ernest Harmon Hix was born on September 13, 1902. Before World War I, the family first located to Nashville, Tennessee, then Spartanburg, South Carolina. John Harmon Hix was a traveling salesman and moved his family to Greenville, South Carolina, where their third child, a daughter, Elizabeth Jane, was born in August 1918.

At an early age, John McCary Hix had a strong urge to draw. He drew unflattering caricatures of his teachers which often got him into trouble. Eventually his cartooning paid off and his drawings appeared in the Nautilus, the Greenville High School newspaper. While in school, John took a job with the Greenville Daily News as a staff artist for $5 a week. He was also a delivery boy on his bicycle, which earned him $7 a week. His dog Pal, a shaggy black and white half-collie and half-water spaniel, followed him everywhere on his deliveries. John trained Pal to drop papers on the doorsteps of one side of street while he delivered the other. He got up every morning at 3:00 AM and was at the newspaper office by 4:00 AM. He was also the local agent for several magazines, selling them as well.

He studied cartooning through a correspondence course, since there were no art schools nearby. When his father died on March 5, 1926, of heart failure, John was in his senior year of school. After graduation from Greenville High School in May 1926 (he has a plaque on the Greenville High School Wall of Fame), John decided he wanted bigger things and applied to the Washington Herald newspaper as an editorial cartoonist. He got the job and moved to Washington, D.C., where he was paid $15 a week. While in Washington, D.C., he attended a few classes at the Corcoran School of Art.

He also started a daily one-column comic strip called Hicks by Hix, featuring various wise-cracking hick characters. It was syndicated by King Features Syndicate. The strip did very well and was syndicated to several newspapers. This success lead to a job with McClure Newspapers in New York City. He illustrated a new strip called Young Frank Merriwell, written by Gilbert Patten. It debuted on March 26, 1928, and ran for 6 months (the comic strip was resurrected in July 1931 as Frank Merriwell's Schooldays and ran for three years, this time illustrated by Jack Wilhelm). He also created a strip called O. Henry's Short Stories. During this time he attended a few classes at the National Academy of Design in New York. His dream was to attend the Yale School of Art where several of his art school classmates were attending, but there was not the money for that so most of John's art training was learned on the job.

Ripley's Believe It or Not!, drawn by Robert Ripley, began syndication in 1918. It contained many fantastic claims, which were not always verified. In 1927, John conceived the idea of Strange as It Seems and in December of that year, he signed a contract with The McClure Newspaper Syndicate in New York City, making him the nation's youngest nationally syndicated artist at only 20 years old. The cartoon was announced for syndication by McClure in February 1928 and debuted on March 28, 1928, in about 50 newspapers, the same day Young Frank Merriwell debuted. The cartoon was one panel with several illustrations of strange and unusual people, places and events. The feature required much more than just drawing as countless hours of research were required for the ideas and to verify their authenticity. Hix advertised widely that all of his claims were verified by at least three sources. He even included a notation on his cartoons, "If you doubt this, write for proof to the author." In the May 20, 1929, issue of Time magazine, it was erroneously reported that the comic had debuted the previous week. A letter to the editor three weeks later from Harold Matson, Managing Editor of the syndicate, corrected the timing of the cartoons publication dates. Time compared Hix to Ripley with this observation: "Cartoonist Hix does not seem quite so able with his pencil as Cartoonist Ripley. Astounder Ripley, after nine years, does not seem quite so astounding as fresh Astounder Hix."

In the January 4, 1930, edition of Editor & Publisher magazine, Hix announced that in early February 1930, Strange as It Seems would be expanded to include a full page Sunday color edition. The comic was being carried in over 80 newspapers by this time. John was now drawing a daily panel plus a Sunday color panel, a full 365 cartoons a year. As the cartoon grew in popularity and distribution spread into more papers, fans began mailing John ideas for the feature. To verify the story ideas, John would correspond with educators, scientists, civic workers and historians from around the world for photographs and documentation of authenticity. The Los Angeles Times reported that Hix rarely traveled for his ideas, but relied on correspondence for verification and had built a repository of 50,000–60,000 usable ideas ready to be incorporated into his cartoons. The claim that drew the most requests for proof of authenticity was that George Washington was the eighth president of the United States and that he was born on February 11, not February 22. The cartoons were often accompanied by several paragraphs of explanation in an article next to the cartoon.

John Hix continued to live in Washington, D.C., and is listed in the 1930 U.S. Census as living on New Hampshire Avenue, a couple of houses down from the rest of his family. Strange as It Seems became immensely popular and there were many opportunities for expanding the feature. John's brother Ernest Hix became his business manager and together they recognized the possibilities of turning the Strange as It Seems cartoons into a multi-media empire, especially after Ripley's Believe It Or Not! cartoons were transformed into live action movie shorts for Paramount Studios beginning in May 1930.

Universal Studios offered John Hix an opportunity to create movie shorts for their studio and the first Strange as It Seems short was released on August 22, 1930. The shorts would eventually play in over 6,000 movie theaters across the country. Like the Disney brothers a decade before them, the Hix brothers relocated their feature to Hollywood, California, in 1931. In 1931, a hardback book of the cartoon stories was released. The first of many comic books with the cartoons in them appeared in 1932. In May 1932, the cartoon was in over 150 newspapers. By November 1932, the cartoons were appearing in England, China and Japan.

In the spring of 1935, John Hix turned his cartoons into a successful 15-minute radio program on the Columbia – Don Lee network. Beginning on Sept. 13, 1936, The John Hix Scrapbook was released as half of the syndicated Sunday Color full page cartoon. In September 1939, the radio show became a 30-minute program broadcast weekly over the CBS network for 72 weeks. Over 600 radio programs were eventually created. The California Pacific International Exposition in San Diego opened in May 1935 with an exhibit of Ripley's Believe It or Not!. But by the end of that year, exhibit was deemed to be too gruesome. So the exhibitors contacted Ernest and John Hix about opening their own exhibit to replace Ripley's in the 1936 season of the fair. Their exhibit opened in February 1936 and was immensely popular. In 1939, the Hix brothers outmaneuvered Ripley for an exhibit at the 1939 New York World's Fair.

In its heyday, it was reported that the Strange as It Seems comic strip was syndicated in over 1,300 newspapers. John Hix enjoyed people questioning the authenticity of his stories and continued to invite them to write for proof in each cartoon, a feature that became the centerpiece for many of his promotional newspaper articles. During World War II, John worked with the Office of Emergency Management to incorporate 70 ideas they supplied into his comics to help the war effort.

John's health began failing in the early 1940s and Dick Kirby took over the drawing of Strange as It Seems, but Hix still reviewed all of the cartoons prior to publication.

On Monday evening, June 5, 1944, John Hix collapsed against a car, gashing his head in front of a hotel on Ivar Ave. He was taken to his home by his physician and died the following morning, June 6, 1944 (D-Day). The cause of death was a heart attack caused by myocarditis (inflammation of the heart muscle due to a viral infection). He was only 11 days shy of his 37th birthday. On June 8, 1944, the Los Angeles Times announced that there would be a private service coordinated by Forest Lawn Mortuary. John was buried at Forest Lawn Memorial Park in Glendale, CA. His plot is in The Great Mausoleum, Memorial Terrace, Hall of Memory, Columbarium of Memory, Niche 19608. He had no wife or children.

=== Ernest Hix ===
Ernest Harmon Hix Sr. was born September 13, 1902, in Huntsville, Alabama. After he moved to Washington, D.C., with his family in the 1920s, he met and married Elsie Huber in 1932. Ernest became the business manager of the "Strange as It Seems" business and helped to create a multi-media empire of cartoons, movies shorts, books, comics, radio programs and exhibitions. He relocated with his brother, mother, sister and wife to Los Angeles in the 1930s. In 1942, he shared an office with his brother, John, at 6362 Haywood Blvd, Los Angeles, CA and his residence was on Canyon Drive, Los Angeles, California. Ernest took over the Strange as It Seems creative business after John Hix died suddenly in 1944. Besides continuing to write the daily syndicated cartoon, Ernest revived the radio show, as a transcribed 15 minute program in 1947. The program ran until his death on September 18, 1948, in a private plane crash, shortly after take-off from the Newhall Airport north of Los Angeles.

The plane's owner, Eugene Joseff, had been warned not to take off until a fog lifted, but he took off anyway. The plane crashed and burst into flames after circling the field. Beside Ernest Hix and Eugene Joseff, there were two other persons killed in the plane crash: John M. Lacey, the pilot and Wilmer F. Pemberton, a designer. Joseff was the maker and supplier of about 90% of the ornate jewelry used in motion pictures at the time. After his death, Hix's wife Elsie took over the Strange as It Seems work.

=== Elsie Hix ===
Elsie Elizabeth Huber was born November 11, 1902, in Allentown, Pennsylvania. Her parents were John and Anna Lowe Huber, both born in Germany. They immigrated separately to the United States in their twenties and were married in Pennsylvania in 1894. Elsie Huber graduated from Cedar Crest College in 1928. From 1928 to 1930, she taught secretarial courses at Virginia Intermont College in Bristol, Virginia. In 1930, she became the Office Business Manager of Remington Rand Co. in Washington, D.C. She held this position until her marriage in 1932 to Ernest Harmon Hix Sr. After the family moved to Los Angeles in the 1930s, from 1939 until 1964, she was the Executive Secretary to George E. Kinsey, a Los Angeles real estate investor, philanthropist and former president of the Los Angeles Coliseum Commission. After the death of her husband in 1948 in a private plane crash, she took over the work of Strange as It Seems. She was the writer of the comic strip for 15 years until 1963, when she turned it over to her son, Ernest Harmon Hix Jr. In 1964, she married Donald Lee Chamberlin. They were married until his death in 1976. From 1985 she lived in Glendora, California. She died on December 9, 1995, in Glendale, California, and is buried in the Forest Lawn Memorial Park cemetery in Glendale.

=== Phyllis and Ernest Hix, Jr. ===
Ernest Harmon Hix Jr. is the son of Ernest Harmon Hix Sr. and Elsie Elizabeth Huber Hix. He wrote and produced the Strange as It Seems comic strip with his wife Phyllis from 1963 until the feature ceased production in 1970.

=== Jeff Hix ===
Jeffrey David Hix is the son of Ernest Harmon Hix Jr. and Phyllis Hix and is curator of the Strange as It Seems archives. Hix is reviving the Strange as It Seems brand for the digital age.
