= Jinx =

Curse attracting bad luck in superstition and folklore

A jinx (also jynx), in popular superstition and folklore, is a curse or the attribute of attracting bad or negative luck.

== Etymology ==
The Online Etymology Dictionary states that jynx, meaning a charm or spell, was in usage in English as early as the 1690s. The same source states that "jinx", with that specific spelling, is first attested in American English in 1911. Jynx/jinx is traced to the 17th-century word jyng, meaning "a spell", and ultimately to the Latin word iynx.

The Latin iynx came from the Greek name of the wryneck, iunx, associated with sorcery; not only was the bird used in the casting of spells and in divination, but the Ancient Romans and Greeks traced the bird's mythological origins to a sorceress named Iynx, who was transformed into this bird to punish her for a spell cast on the god Zeus.

== History ==
A character named Mr Jinx appeared in Ballou's monthly magazine – Volume 6, page 276, in 1857.

Barry Popik of the American Dialect Society suggests that the word can be traced back to an American folksong called Captain Jinks of the Horse Marines written by William Lingard in 1868.

In 1887, the character Jinks Hoodoo, described as "a curse to everybody, including himself" appeared in the musical comedy Little Puck, and the name was quickly picked up by the press.

== In sports ==
One of the uses of the word "jinx" has been in the context of baseball; in the short story The Jinx (1910) – later collected in the book The Jinx: Stories of the Diamond (1911) – Allen Sangree wrote:

By th' bones of Mike Kelly, I'll do it! Yes, sir, I'll hoodoo th' whole darned club, I will. I'll put a jinx on 'em or my name ain't Dasher, an' that goes!

And again

But the ball players instantly knew the truth. "A jinx, a jinx," they whispered along the bench. "Cross-eyed girl sittin' over there back o' third. See her ? She's got Th' Dasher. Holy smoke, look at them eyes!" Like the discreet and experienced manager he was, McNabb did not chasten his men in this hour of peril. He treated the matter just as seriously as they, condoling with The Dasher, bracing up the Yeggman, execrating the jinx and summoning all his occult strategy to outwit it.

And later referenced in Pitching at a Pinch (1912), Christy Mathewson explained that "a jinx is something which brings bad luck to a ball player." Baseball's most common "jinx" belief is that talking about a pitcher's ongoing no-hitter will cause it to be ended. See also Curse of the Bambino.

== Ships ==
In 2017 the MS Queen Victoria was described as "jinxed" after suffering two misfortunes within three weeks of each other, In the 20th century, the Australian aircraft carrier HMAS Melbourne was sometimes said to be jinxed, having twice struck a friendly ship, with considerable loss of life.
