= Bobby Thatcher =

American comic strip

- Author: George Storm; Sheldon Mayer (1937)
- Current status/schedule: concluded
- Launch date: March 21, 1927
- End date: October 16, 1937
- Syndicate(s): McClure Newspaper Syndicate
- Preceded by: Ben Webster's Career

Bobby Thatcher was an American newspaper adventure comic strip created by the cartoonist George Storm. Storm launched Bobby Thatcher March 21, 1927, for the McClure Syndicate. The series ran until October 16, 1937.

Sheldon Mayer worked on the strip for the last five months, from June 7 to October 16, 1937.

== Characters and story ==
The plot followed the adventures of 15-year-old Bobby Thatcher, who is mistreated by his guardian, Jed Flint. Bobby runs away from home to seek his fortune and find the whereabouts of his sister Hattie. The storyline soon erupted into high adventure as the honest, hard-working Bobby saves lives and becomes involved with criminals and other unsavory characters.

The central character's name was spelled "Bobbie" in early episodes.

== Books ==
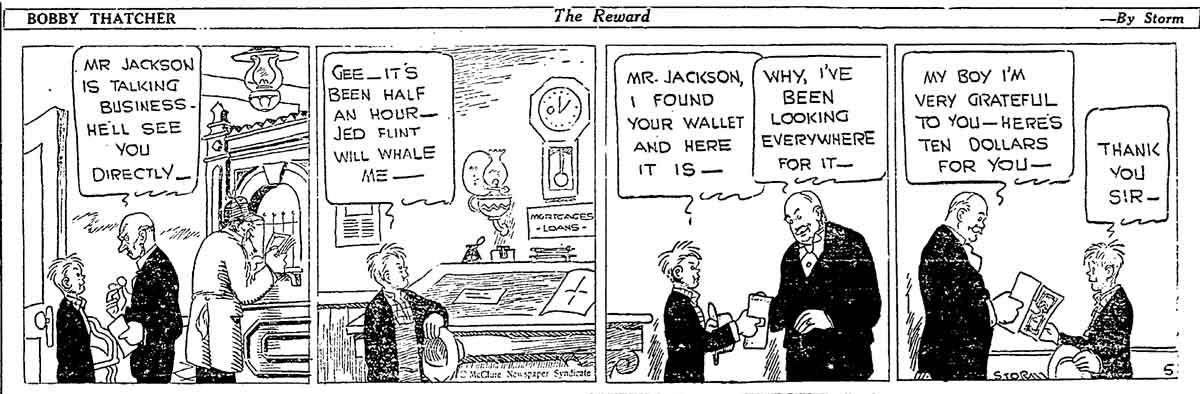
George Storm's Bobby Thatcher (March 29, 1927)

Some of the daily strips were later reprinted:

- Bobby Thatcher's Romance (1931)
- Bobby Thatcher and the Treasure Cave (1932).

== George Storm ==
Bobby Thatcher creator George Storm was born in 1893 and died in 1976. Storm was on the staff of the San Francisco Daily News in 1922. and three years later he began his first newspaper strip, Phil Hardy, scripted by Jay Jerome Williams under the pseudonym Edwin Alger, Jr. When Phil Hardy came to an end after 11 months. Storm drew Ben Webster's Career (Bell Syndicate, 1925–26) before coming up with Bobby Thatcher.

During the 1940s, Storm drew for DC Comics, Fawcett and Dell Comics.

A year after his death, his comic strips were collected in Bobby Thatcher, Including Philip Hardy: A Compilation, 1925-1927 (Hyperion Press, 1977) with an introduction by Bill Blackbeard.
