= The Wizard of Oz (1950 film) =

1950 puppet adaptation of the book by L. Frank Baum

The Wizard of Oz is a 1950 half-hour television adaptation with puppets of L. Frank Baum's famous 1900 children's fantasy novel, directed by Burr Tillstrom, best known for creating the TV show Kukla, Fran and Ollie.

It was telecast live on May 22, 1950, by NBC. A print of the show is preserved in 16 mm. It is not to be confused with the 1939 full-length classic MGM film starring Judy Garland, which was first telecast by CBS in 1956.

== Reception ==
Tillstrom's work is said to have "brought to television the captivating charm of the early Walt Disney films". Although the film did not have a great commercial success, it received positive retrospective response.

== Legacy ==
The puppets were displayed at the Detroit Institute of Arts in 2020.
