= Allen Sangree =

American journalist

- Born: Allen Luther Sangree; 1878; Pennsylvania, U.S.
- Died: March 1924 (aged 45–46); Trenton, New Jersey, U.S.
- Writing career
- Genres: Sports Writer, War Journalist
- Subjects: Baseball Writer, Boer War

Allen Luther Sangree, also as Allan or Alan (c. 1878 – March 2, 1924) was an American sports writer and war journalist.

== Life ==
Father: Milton H. Sangree, Mother: Jane E. Hudson. Born around 1878, most likely in the area of Harrisburg or Steelton, Pennsylvania.

Attended Gettysburg College (class of 1892) Member of the Sigma Chi Theta fraternity

On the staff of the New York Sun some time around 1896

With the New York World as a correspondent traveling to Africa reporting on the trouble between Great Britain and the South Africa Republic prior to the Boer war. He reported for Collier's during the Boer War as well as for Cosmopolitan

...

Incidentally the favorite baseball paper this summer, if merit counts in making popularity, will be the Evening World. With the best baseball men in the country, Allen Sangree and Bozeman Bulger, sticking closer to the Giants and the Highlanders then the lamb ever stuck to Mary, there will be little of straight baseball or the humorous incident characteristic of the game that readers of the Evening World will miss.

In fact, Mr. Sangree and Mr. Bulger are sure to knock out a home run every day.

— Edgrens Column (March 1, 1905), New York Evening World

Started writing as one of the featured baseball writers for the New York Evening World on March 11, 1905

Allen Sangree, newspaper man, author, world-wanderer, and one of the cleverest pencillers who ever sat behind the wired screen at a baseball game, is a happy husband today ...

— New York Evening World (November 4, 1905)

Married Kate Bradley (1888–1952) on November 4, 1905

On October 2, 1908 Allen Sangree was asked by William McMutrie Speer (a member of the editorial staff of the New York World) via the city editor George Carteret, to locate some Panamanians who had recently came to town with a possible connection to William Nelson Cromwell and the Panama Canal. Allen was unable to locate them, reported back to the editorial staff with no story and the assignment was crossed off. However Allen's investigation did appear to have stirred up William Nelson Cromwell's PR staff who approached Caleb Van Hamm (the managing editor) and "demanded ... what the World meant by getting after his boss without giving him a look-in."

... Quite a few of our old friends and acquaintances have left us Sid. Are Alan Sangree and Bill MacBeth still present? And is Bill Farnsworth still on that Atlanta paper? ..."

— letter from Hal Chase to Sid Mercer (1942), Hal Chase

Died March 2, 1924, in Trenton, N.J., after having been hospitalized for a breakdown two years earlier.

== Writings ==
A turn of the century (1900s) writer.

=== Early references ===
1892 he had a position with McClure's syndicate in New York and wrote for McClure's.

=== South Africa and the Boer War ===
- Wrote a character sketch of Cecil Rhodes in the February 1900 issue of Ainslee's Magazine
- Was a New York journalist who was at one time stationed in Cape Town South Africa as the secretary of the U.S. consul-general.
- He covered the Boer War in South Africa traveled with General Christiaan De Wet

"General DeWet and His Campaign," is the title of a well-written and beautifully Illustrated article in the May number of The Cosmopolitan. To quote the editor of this magazine: "Nothing which has appeared in The Cosmopolitan for a long time will be received with as much interest as this authentic picture of General De Wet, the strategist, and his campaign. Mr. Allen Sangree, who was with General De Wet in a large number of his campaigns, is one of the distinguished men who risked their lives to present to the world a vivid account of what many military men believe to be the most wonderful campaign ever fought in any age."

Portions of Mr. Sangree's article are extremely pathetic. He speaks of the young Burghers, "many of them mere school children whose astonishing adventures will scarcely be believed by posterity," who will nevertheless, "go down in history as the bravest of the brave."

Speaking of De Wet an author says: "Compared with his achievements, those of Baden-Powell or Kitchener are like a burning match dropped in the ocean."

— Dominicana: A Magazine of Catholic Literature (1901)

=== Sports writer ===
- Wrote the often quoted piece

The fundamental reason for the popularity of the game is the fact that it is a national safety valve. Voltaire says that there are no real pleasures without real needs. Now a young, ambitious and growing nation needs to "let off steam." Baseball furnishes the opportunity. Therefore, it is a real pleasure.... That is what baseball does for humanity. It serves the same purpose as a revolution in Central America or a thunderstorm on a hot day.... A tonic, an exercise, a safety-valve, baseball is second only to Death as a leveler. So long as it remains our national game, America will abide no monarchy, and anarchy will be too slow

— Allen Sangree (1907), New York World

- Wrote the short story "The Jinx" in 1910, which was included later in his book The Jinx: Stories of the Diamond (1911) which is probably one of the earliest written references to the word jinx to mean someone being unlucky.
  - A review of the book "The Jinx: Stories of the Diamond"

Mr. Allen Sangree, the well-known sporting writer, has made a most valuable addition to baseball literature by his recent volume of tales from the diamond. This attractive little book published by the G. W. Dillingham Co., contains seven thrilling stories which embody in full measure, all the fire and dash and enthusiasm of the great game they typify. ... It is most fitting that baseball should have a literature all its own, and no inconsiderable step in the attainment of this literature is represented in this bright, clever and interesting volume from the pen of Mr. Sangree

— book reviewer (Jan 1912), BaseBall Magazine

- Was a member of the Baseball Writers' Association of America in 1911 and 1914

=== Other works ===
Poet "Your Old Uncle Sam", which was put to the music of "The Old Grey Mare"

=== Bibliography ===
- Sangree, Allen (1911). The Jinx: Stories of the Diamond. New York: G. W. Dillingham Company.
- Sangree, Allen (May 1901). "De Wet and His Campaign". Cosmopolitan. No. 31. pp. 65–74.
- Sangree, Allen (September 1907). ""Fans" and Their Frenzies; The Wholesome Madness of Baseball". Everybody's Magazine. No. 17. pp. 378–87.
- Sangree, Allen (September 1911). "No more war in baseball Great Conflicts in the History of the Game - Part II" (PDF). Baseball Magazine. Vol. VII, no. 5. pp. 21–29. Archived (PDF) from the original on 27 September 2007.
- Sangree, Allen (1906). "The Strategy of Baseball". Everybody's Magazine. Vol. 15. p. 509.

==== Short stories ====
- "A Break in Training", The Saturday Evening Post, February 18, 1911
- "The Naive Mr. Dasher-Story of a Baseball Jinx", The Saturday Evening Post, May 28, 1910
- "The Ringer", The Saturday Evening Post, May 6, 1911
- "In Dutch", The Saturday Evening Post June 17, 1911
- "The Indian Sign", The Saturday Evening Post, September 9, 1911
- "That Load of Hay", Top-Notch, September 20, 1914
- "A Time Exposure", The Popular Magazine, February 7, 1915
- "The Sacrifice Hit", The Popular Magazine, September 7, 1915
- "The Limited Male", The Popular Magazine, September 20, 1916
- "Nix on the Slaughter", Ainslee's Magazine, October 1916

==== Articles ====
- "Americans in South Africa", Munsey's, March 1900
- "The Lonely Idol of the Fickle 'Fans'", The Saturday Evening Post, July 29, 1905
- "Why Nobody Loves the Umpire", The Saturday Evening Post, September 2, 1905

== Samuel Gompers and the labor movement ==
There is a reference to Allen Sangree in the papers of Samuel Gompers where a friend, writes

... The Manufacturer's Association has organized a "Secret Service" system, the business of which will be to procure information as to the habits of labor leaders, and for the purpose of obtaining evidence of something of a criminal character against such leaders. I am informed that they are particularly anxious to get something on you.... A man named Allen Sangree is the general manager, and the information that I have is that he has fifty men employed under him. This Mr. Sangree was formerly employed on the New York Journal as its "Sporting Editor"

— John Morrison (October 22, 1907), Private correspondence, Samuel Gompers Papers

There is a reference in the Congressional Record

Briefly, Mr. Brownell sent Allen Sangree to Maine last February or March to assist Dr. Crockett in preparing the book on Gompers' career in Maine....
