= Boody Rogers =

American cartoonist, 1904-1996

- A Boody Rogers World War II chalk talk
- Born: Gordon G. Rogers; 8 September 1904 Hobart, Indian Territory, Oklahoma, U.S.
- Died: February 6, 1996 (aged 91)
- Areas: Cartoonist, Writer, Artist
- Pseudonyms: Charles McGraw; Cliff Terrell; R. Donrog; Tody Turnovah; Ralph Wolfe
- Notable works: Sparky Watts
- Awards: First prize, Childress County Fair, 1922

Gordon G. Rogers (September 8, 1904 – February 6, 1996), better known as Boody Rogers, was an American comic strip and comic book cartoonist who created the superhero parody Sparky Watts.

Born in Hobart, Oklahoma, Rogers attended the University of Arizona, the Chicago Academy of Fine Arts and the Chicago Art Institute. His artistic influences included Walter Berndt.

== Comic strips ==
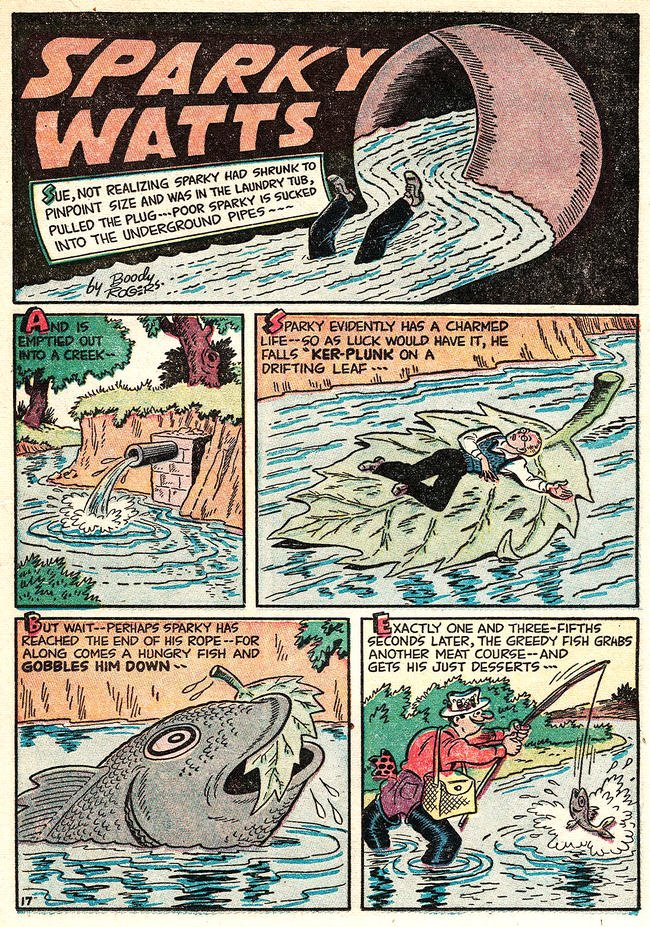
Boody Rogers' Sparky Watts

In the late 1920s and through the 1930s, Rogers illustrated newspaper strips for such syndicates as the Newspaper Feature Service and the Chicago Tribune New York News Syndicate. Rogers was Zack Mosley's assistant on The Adventures of Smilin' Jack when he sold his own strip, Sparky Watts, to the Frank Jay Markey Syndicate, which distributed such strips as Ed Wheelan's Big Top and Rube Goldberg's Lala Palooza. Sparky Watts debuted Monday, April 29, 1940 in some 40 newspapers. The strip ended when Rogers was drafted. During World War II he gave chalk talks to servicemen. His World War II experiences are detailed in his autobiography, Homeless Bound (1984). Rogers also worked, uncredited (under the pseudonum Cliff Terrell), on Betty Brown, Ph.G. for Drug Topics, a pharmacy trade journal. Rogers took the strip over from Zack Mosley when Mosley began focusing on his Smilin' Jack strip. Betty Brown, Ph.G. began a hiatus in 1942 (when Rogers entered the military), and he resumed the strip in 1946. It ran in Drug Topics until he concluded it in 1948.

== Comic books ==
Rogers had work published in Dell Publishing's The Funnies, a seminal 1920s precursor of comic books. Rogers recalled his introduction to the job, taking place in 1929:

A friend had told me that Dell Publications was starting a comic book. . . . I came to their building. . . . I showed my one page of "Rock Age Roy" to the editor. He bought it! . . . Then I did some other things — "Deadwood Gulch," "Campus Clowns," "Sancho and the Don," and some puzzle pages. Dell bought them all. . . . I didn’t realize it then, but I was working on the first comic book ever published. It was the right idea, but the wrong format. It was more like a tabloid paper than the small comic books of today. It only lasted a year, but, thank God, it got us started in New York City.

During the 1930s, Rogers illustrated cowboy comics for Dell Comics and DC Comics. Because Markey was part owner of the Columbia Comics Group (Skyman, The Face), reprints of Sparky Watts turned up in Columbia's Big Shot Comics, which featured other strips distributed by either Markey or the McNaught Syndicate (which distributed Mickey Finn and Toonerville Folks). Sparky Watts began in Big Shot #14 (June, 1941), and the character starred in four issues of his own comic for Columbia, beginning November, 1942.

Back from World War II, Rogers returned to syndication in 1946 with McNaught, and he drew new six-page stories for Big Shot, plus in 1947, he created another six issues for Sparky's own title. Rogers also illustrated Babe and Dudley for Prize Comics.

Rogers retired from comics in 1952 and began operating a pair of art supply stores in Arizona.

== Bibliography ==
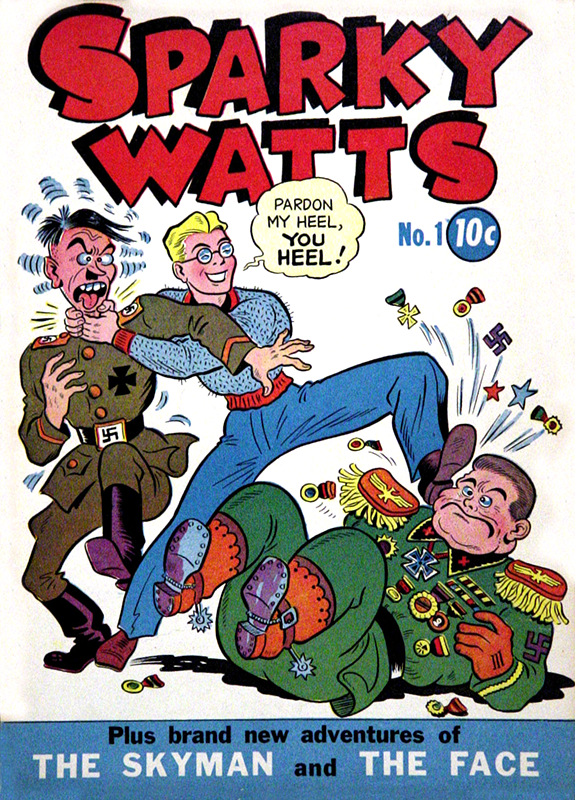
The first issue of Sparky Watts.

- Rogers, "Boody" Gordon. Homeless Bound. Seagraves, Texas: Pioneer Book Publishing, 1984).
- Yoe, Craig. Boody: The Bizarre Comics of Boody Rogers (Fantagraphics, 2009) Collection of the best Sparky Watts, Babe and Dudley stories.

== Sources ==
- Fiveash, Chance. "Boody Rogers," The Comics Journal #275 (2006).
- Lambiek: Boody Rogers
