= Dixie Dugan (film) =

1943 film by Otto Brower

- Film poster
- Directed by: Otto Brower
- Screenplay by: Lee Loeb; Harold Buchman
- Based on: Dixie Dugan by J. P. McEvoy and John H. Striebel
- Produced by: William Goetz; Walter Morosco
- Starring: Lois Andrews; James Ellison; Charlotte Greenwood
- Cinematography: J. Peverell Marley
- Edited by: J. Watson Webb Jr.
- Music by: Emil Newman; Arthur Lange
- Distributed by: 20th Century Fox
- Release date: March 12, 1943
- Running time: 63 minutes
- Country: United States
- Language: English
- Box office: 74 Million

Dixie Dugan is a 1943 American comedy film, directed by Otto Brower. It stars Lois Andrews, James Ellison, and Charlotte Greenwood. Intended as the first of a series, the film was not a success and the plans for sequels were scrapped.

== Plot ==
Taking place during World War II, Dixie Dugan becomes a taxi driver in hopes of helping the war effort, but her bad driving leads her to crash with businessman Roger Hudson in the car. In order to further help the war effort, Dixie takes a civil service exam, but ends up becoming Roger's secretary. To get her out of the office, Roger has Dixie survey women about what is preventing them from doing defense work. The survey ends up being extremely useful. Dixie becomes a hero and goes with Roger to conduct the same survey in England.

== Cast ==
- Lois Andrews as Dixie Dugan
- James Ellison as Roger Hudson
- Charlotte Greenwood as Gladys Dugan
- Charles Ruggles as Timothy Dugan
- Helene Reynolds as Jean Patterson
- Raymond Walburn as Judge J.J. Lawson
- Ann Todd as Imogene Dugan
- Eddie Foy Jr. as Matt Hogan
- Irving Bacon as Mr. Kelly
- Sarah Edwards as Mrs. Kelly
- George Melford as Mr. Sloan
- Mae Marsh as Mrs. Sloan
- Morris Ankrum as Editor
- George Lessey as Sen. Ira Patterson
