= Creig Flessel =

American comics artist (1912–2008)

- Creig Flessel
- Born: Creig Valentine Flessel; February 2, 1912 Huntington, New York, U.S.
- Died: July 17, 2008 (aged 96) Mill Valley, California, U.S.
- Area: Penciller
- Notable works: Sandman; Shining Knight
- Awards: Inkpot Award (1992)

Creig Valentine Flessel (February 2, 1912 – July 17, 2008) was an American comic book artist and an illustrator and cartoonist for magazines ranging from Boys' Life to Playboy. One of the earliest comic book illustrators, he was a 2006 nominee for induction into the comics industry's Will Eisner Hall of Fame.

== Biography ==
=== Early life and career ===
The son of Frank John Flessel, a blacksmith, and his wife Ida Hawkins Bunce, Flessel was born in Huntington, Long Island, New York. He was the youngest of two boys and two girls, with siblings Frank Bunce Flessel, Laura E. Flessel, and Elizabeth Flessel. Flessel graduated high school in 1930 then attended Grand Central Art School, at Grand Central Terminal in Manhattan, working as a door monitor in exchange for art lessons from instructors including the painter Harvey Dunn. He studied there for two years, with cartoonist Charles Addams a classmate and casual acquaintance. Afterward, he worked one summer as a gardener on William K. Vanderbilt's estate, earning $25 a week.

Flessel began drawing for the pulp magazines of the time, including Street & Smith's The Shadow. "They would give you a copy of a story and the space. Double spread would be $15; single would be seven, sometimes ten," Flessel recalled in 2001. He broke into comics after answering an ad in The New York Times by Major Major Malcolm Wheeler-Nicholson, whose National Allied Publications would eventually become DC Comics, and began freelancing there. His first known work for the publisher appeared in More Fun Comics #10 (cover-dated May 1936), penciling and inking the two-page sword-and-sorcery feature "Don Drake" and the two-page humor strip "Fishy Frolics". Flessel recalled,

I don't think they were looking for any pedigree or "Would you do this?" More like, "You're a live body. What do you want to do? Take this and do it, then." I realized they were desperate so I had to go out and buy a drawing table. They had just one table that they were doing all of the mechanical work on. So I got a table and managed to find a chair and sat down and they said, "Here. Do this." I think I did a couple of center spreads for More Fun. I did [the feature] "Fishy Frolics", I did an "Acorn and Andy" double-spread. Little nonsense cartoons.

Creig Flessel's cover for Detective Comics #7 (Sept.1937)

In 1936, Flessel applied for a position with the advertising agency Johnstone and Cushing, and the firm, feeling he needed more experience, recommended him as an assistant to cartoonist John H. Striebel on the newspaper comic strip Dixie Dugan. He worked for Striebel "[h]alf a day for a year, while I was doing pulps and of course keeping my contact with Johnstone and Cushing, maybe picking up a job," while also continuing to work for Wheeler-Nicholson. Flessel also assisted Streibel with advertising art featuring the humorous radio program characters Vic and Sade, who appeared in Farina Wheat cereal print ads. Flessel next found work with the major advertising agency Johnstone and Cushing, illustrating ads for Nestle Toll House cookies, General Foods, Raisin Bran, Eveready batteries, the Nehi Beverage Company's R.C. Cola (with the characters R.C. and Quickie) and other brands and products.

On November 20, 1937, Flessel and Marie G. Marino were married in Brooklyn, New York City.

=== Golden Age of comic books ===
Concentrating his attention on the fledgling comics medium, Flessel drew the covers of many of the first American comic books, including the pre-Batman Detective Comics #2-19 (April 1937 - Sept. 1938). He both wrote and drew the two-page "Steve Conrad, Adventurer", premiering in New Comics #5 (June 1936); the two-page sports feature "Pep Morgan", premiering More Fun #12 (Aug. 1936); "Bret Lawton" and "Speed Saunders" (the latter with writer E. C. Stoner and later Gardner Fox), both premiering in Detective Comics #1; "Bradley Boys", premiering in More Fun #13; "Hanko the Cowhand", premiering in "More Fun" #25 (Oct. 1937); "Buzz Brown", premiering in More Fun #30 (March 1938); and at least drew and possibly wrote "Red Coat Patrol" also known as "Sgt. O'Malley", premiering in "More Fun" #39 (Jan. 1939). As writer-artist, Flessel created the DC character the Shining Knight, in Adventure Comics #66 (Sept. 1941).

Flessel drew the cover of Action Comics #1 Ashcan.

Flessel, who drew many early adventures of the Golden Age Sandman and is closely associated with that character, has sometimes been credited as the character's co-creator. While Flessel drew the Sandman cover of Adventure Comics #40, generally considered the character's first appearance, the character was created by writer Gardner Fox and artist Bert Christman.

When DC Comics editor Vin Sullivan left the company in 1940 to work for Columbia Comics, Flessel, Fox and others freelanced for his Big Shot Comics. In 1943, when Sullivan formed his own comic book publishing company, Magazine Enterprises, Flessel signed on as associate editor. Among its other publications, the firm produced at least three issues of the highly violent, wartime propaganda comic The United States Marines, which presented "Authentic U.S. Marine Corps Picture Stories" as well as graphic government photographs of such subjects as burned and bayoneted Japanese soldiers.

Alter Ego #45 (Feb. 2005): New Sandman cover art by then 93-year-old Flessel

Flessel drew illustrations for several issues of the pulp magazine Clues Detective Stories in 1939 and 1940. During the late 1950s he also provided uncredited artwork for Al Capp's Li'l Abner comic strip.

=== Later life and career ===
Flessel continued to draw comics, often uncredited, through the 1950s, including Superboy stories in both that character's namesake title and in Adventure Comics; and anthological mystery and suspense tales in American Comics Group (AGC's) Adventures into the Unknown. Flessel's final regular comic-book work was penciling and inking the 6 2/3-page story "The Flying Girl of Smallville" in Superboy #72 (April 1959). He returned in the 1970s to do occasional inking for writer-penciler Joe Simon, as on Prez #4 (March 1973).

Creig Flessel's David Crane (June 10, 1961). The titular minister is not depicted in this particular slice of small-town life.

Beginning in 1960, Flessel drew a Hall Syndicate comic strip about a young minister, David Crane, created by Ed Dodd in 1956 and originally produced by artist Win Mortimer and writer Hart Spence. In 1993, Flessel donated the original art for 2,677 strips to the Ohio State University Cartoon, Graphic and Photographic Arts Research Library. After David Crane ceased publication in 1971, Flessel unsuccessfully attempted several other strips, including Cy Poppins, about the owner of a country store; Willie Wildwood, an environmentally aware strip; and The Other Foot.

Like his friend Jack Cole, creator of Plastic Man, Flessel also regularly contributed cartoons to Playboy magazine, including a series titled "The Adventures of Baron Furstinbed". Many of these cartoons were reprinted in the one-shot Sex and Other Late Night Laughs (1990), collecting the work of 26 Playboy cartoonists.

In 2000, Flessel and his wife Marie moved from the East Coast to Mill Valley, California, where he continued to create art for local events and talent shows. Their son, Peter Flessel, is an environmental engineer, and their daughter, Eugenie Fernandes, is a book illustrator and author in Ontario.

In his final years, Flessel was rediscovered by comic fandom and was the recipient of many honors. He was a guest of honor at the fan convention Wondercon in San Francisco, California, in February 2005, speaking on the Golden/Silver Age Panel. Flessel is also mentioned in Michael Chabon's 2000 novel The Amazing Adventures of Kavalier & Clay (though his name is misspelled "Craig" in early editions).

Flessel suffered a stroke and shortly afterward died at his home in Mill Valley, California, on July 17, 2008.

== Awards and nominations ==
- 1991 Comic-Con International Inkpot Award
- 1992 National Cartoonists Society Silver T-Square Extraordinary Service Award
- 2006 nominee for induction, Will Eisner Hall of Fame.
- 2007 The Sparky Award given by Jeannie Schulz and the Cartoon Art Museum, San Francisco

== Books ==
- Along the Shore by Elizabeth F. Weidner, illustrated by Creig Flessel (Behrman House, 1985) ISBN 0-682-40239-7
- Draw 50 People by Lee J. Ames with Creig Flessel (Doubleday, 1993; Sagebrush reissue, 1994) ISBN 0-613-51071-2 (reissue)
