= Feature Comics =

Comic book anthology series published by Quality Comics

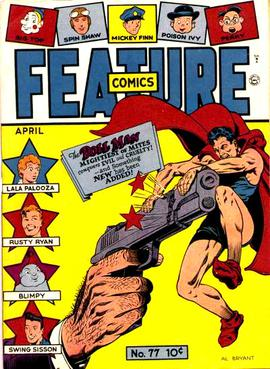
- Feature Comics #77 (April 1944), featuring Doll Man.

Publication information
- Publisher: Quality Comics by Everett M. "Busy" Arnold
- Schedule: Monthly
- Format: Ongoing series
- Genre: , humor/comedy, superhero
- Publication date: October 1937 – May 1950
- No. of issues: 144
- Main character(s): Comic strip reprints (Joe Palooka; Mickey Finn; Dixie Dugan; Bungle Family; Jane Arden); Features superheroes (The Clock, Doll Man, Spider Widow)

Creative team
- Artist: Rube Goldberg
- Editor: Ed Cronin

Feature Comics, originally Feature Funnies, was an American comic book anthology series published by Quality Comics from 1939 until 1950, that featured short stories in the humor genre and later the superhero genre.

The first issue of Feature Funnies.

== Publication history ==
The series started out as a reprint collection of newspaper comic strips that was published by Harry "A" Chesler between 1937 and 1939, for twenty issues entitled Feature Funnies. It featured cannily mixed color reprints of popular newspaper comic strips like Joe Palooka, Mickey Finn and Dixie Dugan with a smattering of new features.

Publisher Everett M. "Busy" Arnold, deducing that Depression-era audiences wanted established quality and familiar comic strips for their hard-earned dimes, formed the suitably titled Comic Favorites, Inc. in collaboration with three newspaper syndicates: the McNaught Syndicate, the Frank J. Markey Syndicate and Iowa's Register and Tribune Syndicate (Comic Favorites later became an imprint of Arnold's Quality Comics, established in 1939).

Hiring cartoonist Rube Goldberg and Goldberg's assistant, Johnny Devlin, Arnold in mid-1937 began publishing Feature Funnies from his office as at 389 Lexington Avenue in Manhattan. Goldberg drew many of the covers.

The new material came from comics packagers, small studios that sprang up to produce comics on demand for publishers looking to enter the emerging comic-book field. Arnold initially bought from the quirkily named Harry "A" Chesler shop but later relied solely on Eisner & Iger, headed by Will Eisner and Jerry Iger. Arnold recalled in the early 1970s: "I believe the first feature I purchased from Eisner & Iger was 'Espionage' in 1938 for Feature Comics (then Feature Funnies)".

Other newspaper comic strip characters in Feature Funnies included the constantly bickering Bungle Family and girl reporter Jane Arden. Feature Comics then continued the numbering with issue #21, and ran until #144.

== Recurring features ==
- Doll Man: a shrinking superhero written and created by Will Eisner (under the pen name "William Erwin Maxwell") debuted in #27 and was the lead feature through #139.
- The Clock: George Brenner's masked crime-fighter was featured was carried over from Feature Funnies, running in every issue of Feature Comics from #21–31 (Apr. 1940), when he moved over to the new Quality Comics title Crack Comics.
- Jane Arden: Reprints of the popular newspaper strip featuring a spunky gal reporter were carried over from Feature Funnies, running in every issue of Feature Comics from #21–31 (Apr. 1940), when the strip also moved over to Crack Comics.
- Spider Widow: a female crime-fighter dressed as a stereotypical Hallowe'en witch, with a green-faced old crone mask, a floppy black hat, and a long black dress. Frank Borth's strip ran from issue #57 (June 1942) to #72 (June 1943).
- Stunt Man Stetson: a story about an amateur detective in Hollywood was the lead from #140 until #144.
