= Register and Tribune Syndicate =

American print syndication service (1922–86)

- Industry: Print syndication
- Founded: 1922; 104 years ago
- Founders: John Cowles, Sr.
- Defunct: 1986; 40 years ago
- Fate: Acquired by King Features Syndicate to become Cowles Syndicate affiliate
- Headquarters: 715 Locust Street, Des Moines, Iowa, U.S.
- Key people: Henry Martin, Charles E. Lounsbury
- Products: Comic strips, newspaper columns
- Owners: Cowles family (1922–1935); Cowles Media Company (1935–1986); Hearst Publications (1986-present)

The Register and Tribune Syndicate was a syndication service based in Des Moines, Iowa, that operated from 1922 to 1986, when it was acquired by King Features to become the Cowles Syndicate affiliate. At its peak, the Register and Tribune Syndicate offered newspapers some 60 to 75 features, including editorial cartoonist Herblock, comic strips, and commentaries by David Horowitz, Stanley Karnow, and others.

Throughout the 1940s the syndicate distributed the weekly "The Spirit Section," a 16-page tabloid-sized newsprint comic book supplement eventually sold to 20 Sunday newspapers with a combined circulation of as many as five million copies. The Register and Tribune Syndicate's most successful comics feature was The Family Circus (launched in 1960), eventually distributed to more than 1,000 newspapers; other long-running strips included Channel Chuckles, Jane Arden, The Better Half, and Tumbleweeds.

== History ==
=== Origins ===
In 1922, The Des Moines Register publisher Gardner Cowles, Sr.' son John Cowles Sr. launched the Register and Tribune Syndicate (the family also owned the Des Moines Tribune). The manager was Henry Martin, who served in that capacity until 1960.

Jane Arden was the syndicate's first breakout hit, launching in 1927 and eventually running until 1968.

Charles E. Lounsbury became the syndicate's chief editor in 1930, serving in that capacity until his death at age 84 in 1952.

=== Supplier to comic books ===
In 1937 the Register and Tribune Syndicate partnered with two other syndicates, the McNaught Syndicate and the Frank Jay Markey Syndicate, as well as with entrepreneur Everett M. "Busy" Arnold, to provide material to the burgeoning comic book industry; many of the syndicate's strips found their way into Arnold's Feature Funnies. In 1939, Cowles Media Company (the syndicate's corporate owner, formed in 1935) and Arnold bought out the McNaught and Markey interests.

=== The Spirit Section ===
In the 1940s, Will Eisner's The Spirit debuted as the main feature of a 16-page Sunday supplement known colloquially as "The Spirit Section". Launched June 2, 1940, this was a tabloid-sized newsprint comic book sold as part of eventually 20 Sunday newspapers with a combined circulation of as many as five million copies. In a 2004 interview, Eisner elaborated on the origins of the supplement:

"Busy" [Arnold] invited me up for lunch one day and introduced me to Henry Martin . . . [who] said, "The newspapers in this country, particularly the Sunday papers, are looking to compete with comic books, and they would like to get a comic-book insert into the newspapers." . . . Anyway, I agreed to do the Sunday comic book and we started discussing the deal [which] was that we'd be partners in the 'Comic Book Section,' as they called it at that time.

The Spirit Section generally included two other, four-page strips (initially Mr. Mystic and Lady Luck), plus filler material. Eisner was the editor, but also wrote and drew most entries — after the first few months, he had the uncredited assistance of writer Jules Feiffer and artists Jack Cole and Wally Wood, though Eisner's singular vision for the strip was a unifying factor. The Spirit Section continued until October 5, 1952.

=== Later years ===
Bil Keane's television-themed panel Channel Chuckles was launched in 1954; he debuted The Family Circus in 1960. Bob Barnes' The Better Half debuted in 1956.

The Old West-themed Tumbleweeds launched in September 1965. That same year, the syndicate broke new ground when it picked up Morrie Turner's Wee Pals, the first comic strip syndicated in the United States to have a cast of diverse ethnicity, dubbed the "Rainbow Gang."

Beginning in 1977, the syndicate was the unofficial home of Marvel Comics strips, including The Amazing Spider-Man (1977–1986; continued by King Features), Conan the Barbarian (1978-1982), Howard the Duck (1977–1978), and The Incredible Hulk (1978–1982).

In 1985, the syndicate was merged into its parent Cowles Media Company. In 1986, the syndicate was sold to Hearst Publications for $4.3 million, becoming a division of King Features Syndicate.

== Register and Tribune Syndicate strips and panels ==
- The Alumnae by Mary Gauerke (Sept. 8, 1969–April 24, 1976)
- America's Best Buy: The Louisiana Purchase by John Chase (1953–1954) — early nonfiction strip
- Amy, originally by Henry Mace (1962–1988; continued by King Features) — also known as Our Girl Amy
- Bats in the Belfry by Frank Beaven (1935–1937)
- Benchley by Jerry Dumas (and John Reiner) and Mort Drucker (1984–1986)
- The Better Half, originally by Bob Barnes (1956–1986; continued by King Features)
- Brad and Dad by Rube Goldberg (1939-1941)
- Channel Chuckles by Bil Keane (1954–1976)
- Citizen Smith by Dave Gerard (1967–1984)
- Clifford by Jules Feiffer (1949–1950)
- The Diary of a New Father, by Robert E. Dickson and Walt DePew (1926–?)
- Double Take by Bob Barnes (1951–1957)
- Elmo and Debbie / Little Debbie by Cecil Jensen (1949–1961)
- The Family Circus, originally by Bil Keane (1960–1986; continued by King Features)
- Flying to Fame by Walt DePew (1933)
- Gene Autry Rides by Till Goodan (1940-1941)
- Graves, Inc. by Pat Brady (early 1980s)
- Herman by Clyde Lamb (1949–1966)
- Jack Armstrong by Bob Schoenke (1947–1950)
- Jane Arden, originally by Monte Barrett and artist Frank Ellis (1927–1968) — retitled Laredo and Jane Arden from 1964 to 1968
- Laredo Crockett by Bob Schoenke (1950–1964; merged with Jane Arden to become Laredo and Jane Arden 1964–1968)
- Marvel Comics strips
  - The Amazing Spider-Man, originally by Stan Lee and John Romita, Sr. (1977–1986; continued by King Features)
  - Conan the Barbarian, originally by Roy Thomas, John Buscema, and Ernie Chan (1978-1982)
  - Howard the Duck, originally by Steve Gerber and Gene Colan (June 1977–October 1978)
  - The Incredible Hulk, originally by Stan Lee, Larry Lieber, and Ernie Chan (1978–1982)
- Ned Brant / Dick Ember, originally by Robert Zuppke and Walt DePew, later by Ted Ashby (Oct. 21, 1929–June 4, 1949)
  - Baseball by Walt DePew (Jan. 27, 1930–?) — topper strip
  - Off the Campus by Walt DePew (Jan. 27, 1930–?) — topper strip
  - Sports by Ned Brandt by Walt DePew (1935–1937) — topper strip
  - They’re Still Talking by Walt DePew (1930s) — topper strip
- Odd Fact by Will Eisner (1975–1976) — panel
- Old Harrigan of Sleepy Eye by Len Maurer (1955-1958)
- The Red Knight by John J. Welch and Jack McGuire (June 1940–Sept. 1943)
- The Rock Channel by Guy Gilchrist (1980s)
- Side Show by Rube Goldberg (1938-1941) — Sundays only
- "The Spirit Section"
  - The Spirit by Will Eisner (1940–1952)
  - Lady Luck, originally by Will Eisner, Chuck Mazoujian, John Celardo, and Lane French (1940–1946)
  - Mr. Mystic, originally by Bob Powell and Lane French (1940–1944)
- Tumbleweeds by Tom K. Ryan (1965–1986; continued by King Features)
- Wee Pals by Morrie Turner (1965–1970s; moved to United Features Syndicate)
- Zane Grey by "Zane Grey" (John J. Welch) and Jack Abbott (Jan. 25 1932–Dec. 18, 1933)
