= Randy Glasbergen =

American cartoonist

- Born: February 20, 1957 New York State, U.S.
- Died: August 11, 2015 (aged 58) Sherburne, New York, U.S.
- Area: Cartoonist
- Pseudonym: Jay Harris
- Notable works: The Better Half (1982–2014)

Randy Glasbergen (February 20, 1957 – August 11, 2015) was an American cartoonist and humorous illustrator best known for three decades of newspaper syndication as well as a freelance career. He produced the syndicated strip The Better Half from 1982 to 2014.

Glasbergen's work appeared in magazines, newspapers, greeting cards, calendars, social media, websites, textbooks, video screens and advertising worldwide. Thousands of Glasbergen's cartoons and comic illustrations have been used by clients including The Wall Street Journal, Reader's Digest, China Daily, Good Housekeeping, Microsoft, Dow Jones, Standard & Poor's, Time Warner Cable, the Harvard Business Review, Funny Times, American Greetings, Hallmark Cards, America Online, and many others around the globe. In addition to cartooning, Randy Glasbergen wrote text for hundreds of greeting cards for Hallmark Cards, American Greetings, and others.

== Biography ==
Glasbergen began his professional cartooning career at age 15. While still in high school, his cartoons were published regularly in many major magazines, including the Saturday Review, The Wall Street Journal, Kiplinger’s Changing Times, the Saturday Evening Post, Cosmopolitan, Weight Watchers, Reader's Digest, and New Woman. After two semesters of journalism studies at Utica College of Syracuse University, he left school to pursue a full-time career as a freelance cartoonist in 1976.

Glasbergen's comic panel The Better Half (originated by Bob Barnes in 1956) was syndicated by King Features Syndicate for 32 years, starting in 1982. From 1982 to 1992, Glasbergen did the strip under the pseudonym "Jay Harris," so as not to confuse publishers who were familiar with his different style of humor and character design. ("Harris" was his wife's maiden name.) At the end of syndication, The Better Half was appearing seven days a week in approximately 150 print and online newspapers around the world. With newspapers losing more and more readers to the Internet, Glasbergen retired The Better Half at the end of 2014 to devote more time and energy to his cartoon licensing operation, Glasbergen Cartoon Service.

His Glasbergen Cartoons feature was syndicated online by GoComics. Glasbergen's Thin Lines health and fitness cartoons also appeared on GoComics as a weekly cartoon panel. Daily Glasbergen cartoons were found on his own website and sponsored editions of his cartoons appeared regularly on Facebook, Twitter, LinkedIn, and other social media outlets.

== Personal life ==
Glasbergen lived in Sherburne, New York, a small rural town, with his wife and three basset hounds. He worked at home on the third floor of a very old house that once served as a boarding house for local school teachers.

He died on August 11, 2015, of cardiac arrest following admission to a hospital for an infection.

Glasbergen's cartoons are still being used around the world in presentations, textbooks, newsletters and all forms of social media thanks to his family and their desire to continue his legacy.

== Bibliography ==
More than a dozen collections of Glasbergen's cartoons were published in paperback and hardcover book form in the United States, United Kingdom, Germany, Netherlands, Portugal, and China. He was also the author of three bestselling North Light Books about the art and business of cartooning: Getting Started Drawing and Selling Cartoons, How To Be A Successful Cartoonist, and TOONS!

Glasbergen's cartoon books have been published in the United States, United Kingdom, Netherlands, Germany, Portugal, and China. The following is a list of his cartoon books:

- Attack of the Zit Monster (Intervarsity Press)
- Technology Bytes (CCC Publications)
- Are We Dysfunctional Yet? (CCC Publications)
- Oh Baby! (CCC Publications)
- The Better Half (CCC Publications)
- Your Computer Thinks You’re An Idiot! (CCC Publications)
- The Weird and Wonderful World of Animals (Lagoon Books)
- The Weird and Wonderful World of Work (Lagoon Books)
- The Weird and Wonderful World of Love (Lagoon Books)
- The Weird and Wonderful World of Diets (Lagoon Books)
