= Charles Benedict Driscoll =

American journalist and editor

- Born: October 19, 1885; South of Wichita, Kansas, U.S.
- Died: January 15, 1951 (aged 65)
- Occupations: Journalist, editor, author
- Employer(s): Wichita Eagle, McNaught Syndicate
- Known for: Originating the "school page" in newspapers; continuing New York Day by Day column
- Notable work: Kansas Irish, Country Jake, East and West of Wichita

Charles Benedict Driscoll (October 19, 1885 – January 15, 1951) was a U.S. journalist and editor. Driscoll was born south of Wichita, Kansas on a farm that was purchased by his father after emigrating from Ireland by way of New York and Ohio. Driscoll wrote of his life in Kansas in the Kansas Irish trilogy; the first two books published in 1943 (Kansas Irish) and 1946 (Country Jake) and the last East and West of Wichita in manuscript, published in E-book by Rowfant Press in 2014. Kansas Irish was republished by Rowfant Press in 2011 in an illustrated paperback edition, introduction by Dr. Matthew Jockers. He began his career as a journalist writing for the Wichita Eagle, and is popularly credited as the originator of the "school page" in newspapers. Driscoll became editor of the Wichita Eagle in 1919 but was forced out of his position in the 1920s by the Ku Klux Klan, active in Kansas politics at the time. Driscoll worked as an editor for the McNaught Syndicate from 1928 until his death, and continued the popular New York Day by Day column after the death of its creator O. O. McIntyre in 1938. Dr. Matthew Jockers has written on the importance of Driscoll as a writer on the Irish in the West ["A Window Facing West: Charles Driscoll's Kansas Irish" New Hibernia Review Volume 8, Number 3], helping to revive interest in his writing and life.
