= Santry (surname) =

Santry is a surname. Notable people with the surname include:

- Eddie Santry (1876–1919), American featherweight boxer
- Edward Santry (1861–1899), American baseball player
- Margaret Santry (1904–1975), American journalist and radio host

== See also ==
- Santry (disambiguation)
