= Spider Widow =

Quality Comics superheroine

Publication information
- Publisher: Quality Comics
- First appearance: Feature Comics #57 (June 1942)
- Created by: Frank Borth

In-story information
- Alter ego: Dianne Grayton
- Abilities: Trained athlete Ability to control black widow spiders

Spider Widow is a superheroine that was published by Quality Comics during the Golden Age of Comic Books. The character was created by writer and artist Frank Borth, and debuted in Feature Comics #57, which bore a cover date of June 1942. Borth continued to write and draw the Spider Widow feature until the end of its run in Feature Comics #72 (June 1943).

Spider Widow is the secret identity of Dianne Grayton, a bored and wealthy athlete who decides to fight crime and foreign saboteurs after discovering she has the ability to control deadly black widow spiders. She disguises herself in a stereotypical Hallowe'en witch costume, wearing a green-faced old crone mask, a floppy black hat, and a long black dress. In her new guise, she calls herself "the Spider Widow, Grandmother of Terror".

In a genre dominated by beautiful young superheroines with shapely bodies, Spider Widow was one of the few to subvert that stereotype; she's "a lovely young woman who actually made herself look like a hideous old hag to fight crime". Valerie Estelle Frankel compares her to the heroine of the 1940–1944 Fiction House comic Fantomah, Mystery Woman of the Jungle: "They transformed from nice young ladies into crone faces of rage and power".

Spider Widow had a complicated relationship with two other Quality heroes, forming a tentative romantic relationship with a male superhero, the Raven, and a corresponding rivalry with Phantom Lady for his affections. Trina Robbins notes that Spider Widow "turned the tables" on the usual hero/sidekick relationship, being a female hero with a lovestruck male assistant.

The Quality Companion says that "this feature seemed to end before its time, probably a victim of Borth's entry into military service". When Borth returned from military service in 1946, he was hoping that he could return and write more "Spider Widow" stories, but was told that there were too many GIs returning, and Quality couldn't give everyone their jobs back. He moved on to create a daily adventure newspaper strip, Ken Stuart, for the Frank J. Markey Syndicate.

== Fictional character biography ==
In Feature Comics #60 (Sept 1942), Nazi agents set a trap for Spider Widow by posting an advertisement in the newspaper that requests her assistance, and then knock her out when she shows up. She is rescued from a boat bound for Germany by the bird-costumed Raven on his first heroic outing, and the two reveal a hidden U-boat to the U.S. Navy. She becomes romantically involved with the Raven (who is later revealed to be Tony Grey); however, neither initially knows what the other looks like without their mask on because they shared their first kiss in the dark. Starting with #60, the stories are billed as "Spider-Widow and the Raven".

The two later team up with Phantom Lady in a multi-part crossover that spanned between Feature Comics #69-71 and Police Comics #21 & 22. This was the only time that Quality Comics' superhero characters ever appeared in each other's strips. Though Spider Widow initially worries that Phantom Lady is a potential rival for the Raven's affections, they nevertheless became allies.

The Spider Widow, the Raven and Phantom Lady appear in each other's stories for several months in 1943, but her final adventure in issue #72 (Oct 1943) was a solo act. The character also appeared in two issues of Police Comics in 1943.

== Powers and abilities ==
Spider Widow has the ability to psychically control black widow spiders. The reason for her gaining this power is never explained. She is also a trained athlete.

== Legacy ==
Spider Widow inspired a character called the Widow in the 2002 Elseworlds miniseries JLA: Destiny, by John Arcudi.
