= Vin Sullivan =

American comic book editor, artist and publisher (1911–1999)

- Born: Vincent Sullivan; June 5, 1911
- Died: February 3, 1999 (aged 87) Manhasset, New York, U.S.
- Areas: Penciller, Editor, Publisher
- Notable works: Superman acquisition Detective Comics #1 cover Columbia Comics; Magazine Enterprises
- Awards: Inkpot Award (1993)

Vincent Sullivan (June 5, 1911 – February 3, 1999) was a pioneering American comic book editor, creator and publisher.

== Career ==
Detective Comics #1 (March 1937) Cover art by Sullivan

As an editor for National Allied Publications, the future DC Comics, he was the first editor on stories featuring Superman from creators Jerry Siegel and Joe Shuster, beginning with that archetypal superhero's first appearance, in Action Comics #1 (1938), and in the following year's Superman, the first American comic book devoted to a single character. In addition, Sullivan drew the premiere cover of Detective Comics, the series that in issue #27 launched the hit character Batman.

After leaving National in 1940, Sullivan was hired by the McNaught Newspaper Syndicate to form a new comic book publishing house. This became the Columbia Comic Corporation (Columbia Comics), where Sullivan launched the superhero omnibus Big Shot Comics, publishing early work by Gardner Fox, Creig Flessel, and Ogden Whitney, among others. Columbia Comics' several superhero features included Skyman.

Unhappy with the reluctance of the owners to develop more original series. Sullivan left Columbia in 1943 and formed Magazine Enterprises. This company lasted until 1958, after which Sullivan left comics.

Sullivan was a guest at the August 1998 Comic-Con International in San Diego, California, where he was reunited with some of his former colleagues. He died six months later due to cancer.
