= Jane Arden (comics) =

Former syndicated comic

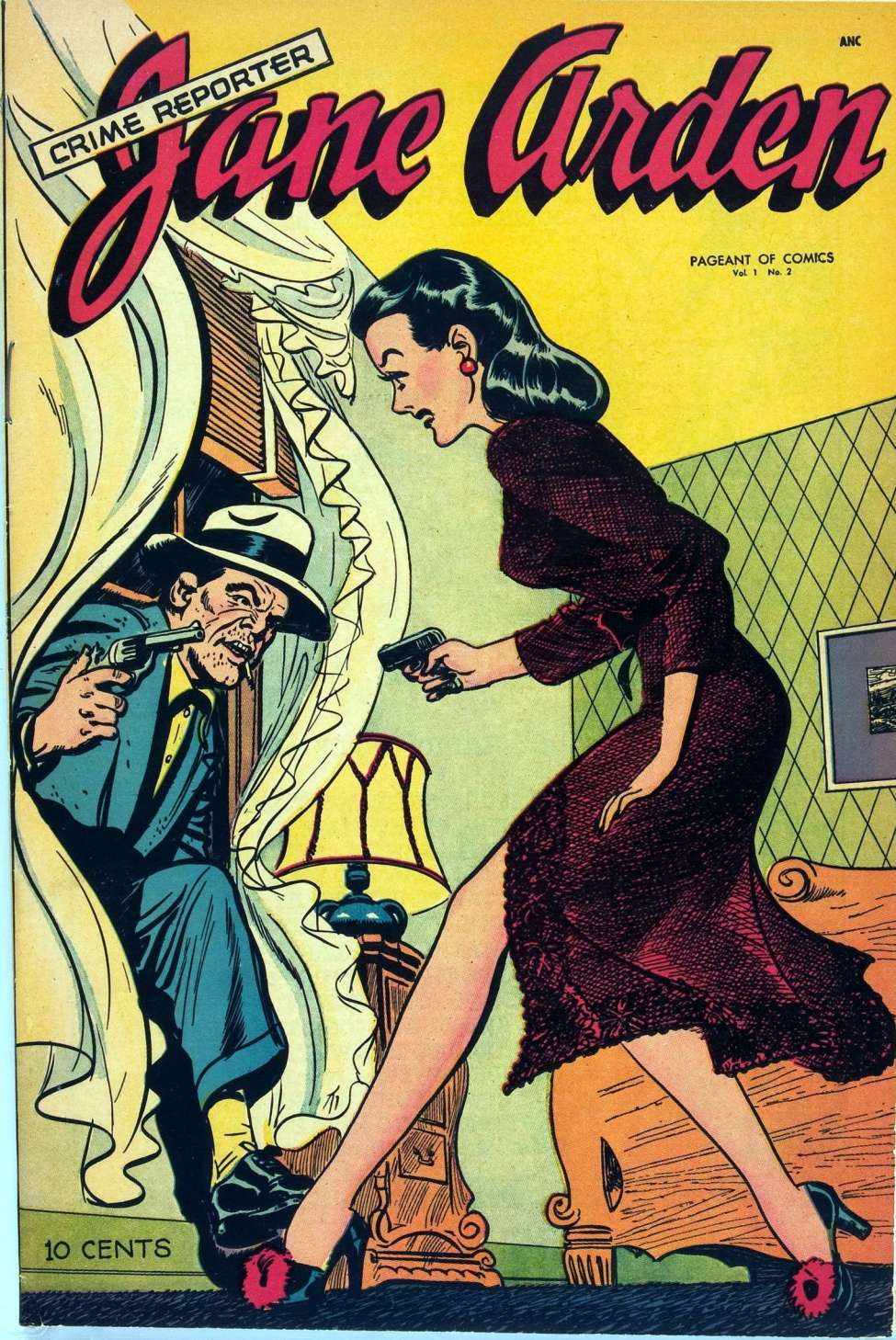
- Author: Monte Barrett (1928–1952); Walt Graham (1952-1968)
- Illustrator(s): Frank Ellis (1928–1935); Russell E. Ross (1935– 1955); Jim Seed (1955–1960); William Hargis (1961–1963); Bob Schoenke (1964–1968)
- Current status/schedule: Concluded daily strip
- Launch date: November 26, 1928
- End date: January 20, 1968
- Alternate name(s): Laredo and Jane Arden (1964–1968)
- Syndicate(s): Register and Tribune Syndicate
- Genre: Adventure

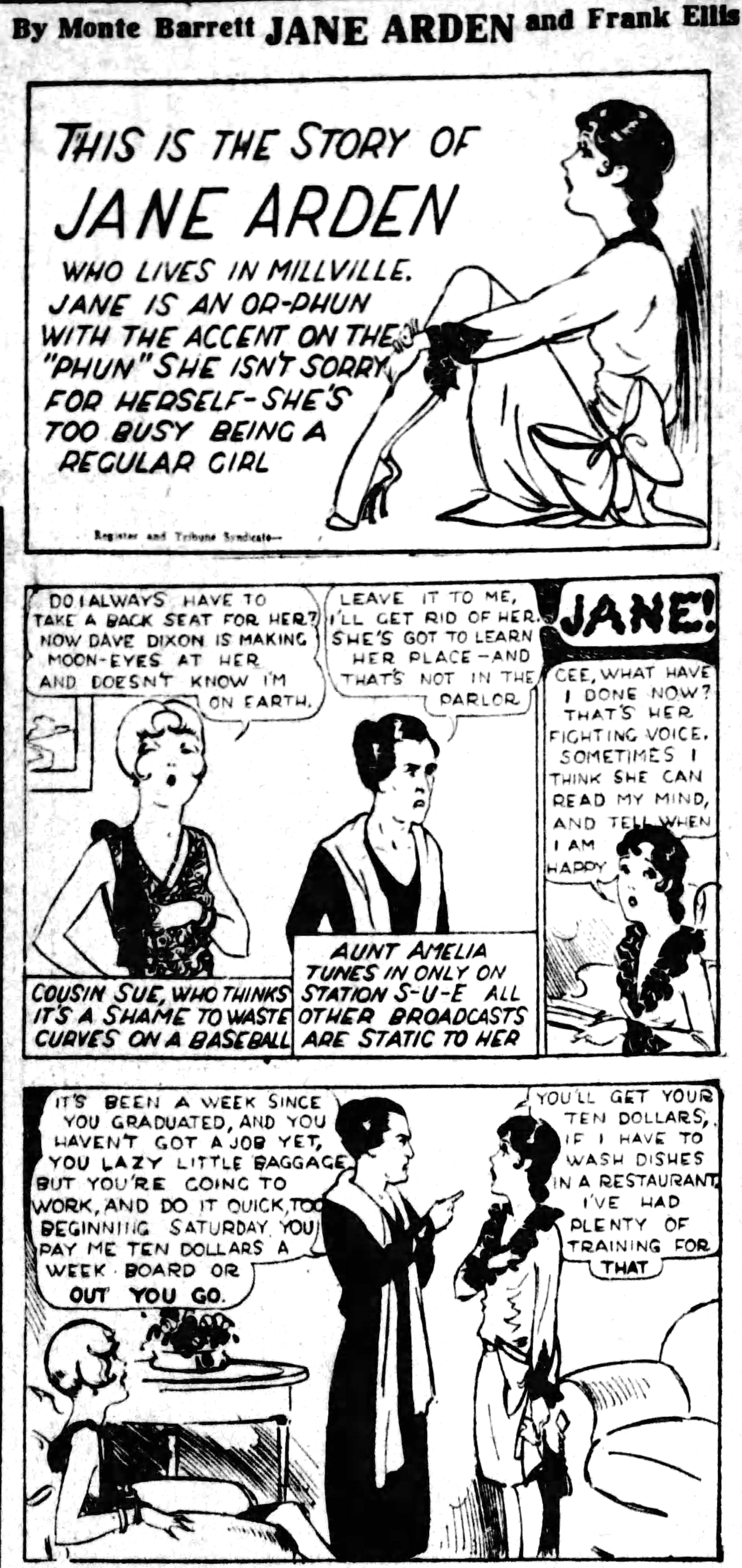
The debut Jane Arden strip, November 26, 1928

Jane Arden was an internationally syndicated daily newspaper comic strip which ran from November 26, 1928 to January 20, 1968. The title character was the original "spunky girl reporter", actively seeking to infiltrate and expose criminal activity rather than just report on its consequences and served as a prototype for later characters such as Superman supporting character Lois Lane and fellow comic strip heroine Brenda Starr, Reporter. Pulitzer Prize-winning columnist Mary McGrory credited Jane Arden with instilling her interest in journalism.

Jane Arden was only moderately successful in the United States, but it was highly popular in Canada and Australia. The strip was widely reprinted in comic books and was also adapted into both a film and a radio series.

== Publication history ==
Jane Arden was created by writer Monte Barrett and artist Frank Ellis for the Register and Tribune Syndicate. Barrett wrote the strip until his death in 1949, and his stories were used until 1952 when Walt Graham assumed the scripting duties. Ellis was one of five artists to draw Jane Arden over its 41-year run.

The work of Ellis' replacement, Russell E. Ross, is perhaps most identified with the character, as he drew the strip for 20 years.

During the strip's last few years, under creator Bob Schoenke, it was combined with another Register and Tribune strip, Laredo Crockett, to become Laredo and Jane Arden (from 1964 to 1968).

=== Jane Arden creators ===
- Monte Barrett (story) & Frank Ellis (art): Nov 26, 1928 - Feb 4, 1933
- Monte Barrett (story) & Russell E. Ross (art): Feb 6, 1933 - Sept 24, 1950
- Russell E. Ross (story and art): Sept 25, 1950 - 1952
- Walt Graham (story) & Russell E. Ross (art): 1952 - 1955
- Walt Graham (story) & Jim Seed (art): 1955 - Sept 3, 1960
- Walt Graham (story) & William Hargis (art): Sept 5, 1960 - Feb 22, 1964
- Bob Schoenke (story and art): Feb 24, 1964 - January 20, 1968

== Story and characters ==
It was during Ross' stint that the strip introduced Tubby, an office boy sidekick transported from Ross' previous Slim and Tubby strip. It was during this period that the strip first included Jane Arden paper dolls and accompanying outfits.

Jane Arden was one of the first comic strip characters to become involved in World War II. Immediately after the outbreak of war in Europe, Barrett and Ross scrapped their current storylines and gave her a war assignment in the fictional neutral kingdom of Anderia (September 25, 1939).

== Reprints ==
Reprints of the newspaper strip were published in comic books beginning with Famous Funnies #2 (September 1934). After issue 35, the reprints appeared in Feature Funnies #1 (October, 1937), published by Comic Favorites, Inc (a predecessor of Quality Comics). (The Register and Tribune Syndicate was part-owner of Comic Favorites.) 20 issues later, the title was renamed Feature Comics. The Arden reprints continued for ten more issues, and then appeared in the first 25 issues of Crack Comics.

United States:

- Feature Funnies #1-20 (October 1937 – May 1939; Comic Favorites, Inc.)
- Feature Comics #21-31 (June 1939 – April 1940; Quality Comics)
- Crack Comics #1-25 (May 1940 – September 1942; Quality Comics)
- Pageant of Comics #2 (October 1947; St. John Publications)
- Jane Arden #1-2 (March 1948 – June 1948; St. John)

Australia:

- Jane Arden #1-29 (1955–1956, Atlas Publications)

== In other media ==
=== Radio ===

A Jane Arden radio drama was broadcast from 1938 through 1939 with Ruth Yorke in the title role of the "fearless girl reporter, the most beautiful woman in the newspaper world." First heard in June 1938 on WJZ in New York, the program moved to the Blue Network on September 26, 1938. Sponsored by Ward Baking, the 15-minute serial aired weekdays at 10:15am. Others in the cast: Helene Dumas, Maurice Franklin, Frank Provo, Bill Baar, Henry Wadsworth and Howard Smith. Alan Kent was the announcer. Manny Siegel provided the sound effects for director Lawrence Holcomb. The series ended June 23, 1939.

=== Film ===
In 1939, Warner Bros. released a film adaptation, The Adventures of Jane Arden, with a storyline in which Jane Arden (Rosella Towne) goes undercover to expose a gang of jewel smugglers. However, her identity is discovered by one of the gang leaders. This film, directed by Terry O. Morse, was heralded as the first of a series, but no subsequent Jane Arden films were produced.
