= Reg Manning =

American cartoonist

Reginald W. Manning (April 8, 1905 – March 10, 1986) was an American artist and illustrator, best known for his editorial cartoons.

== Biography ==
Manning was born in Kansas City, Missouri, but he came to live in Phoenix, Arizona. Manning's only art training occurred during high school. After graduating, Manning worked as a freelancer. In 1926, The Arizona Republic hired Manning as a photographer and artist. At first, Manning's work appeared in several forms in the paper. Although he was interested in drawing comic strips, the popularity of his editorial work led him to focus on editorial cartoons. His work was syndicated in as many as 170 newspapers.

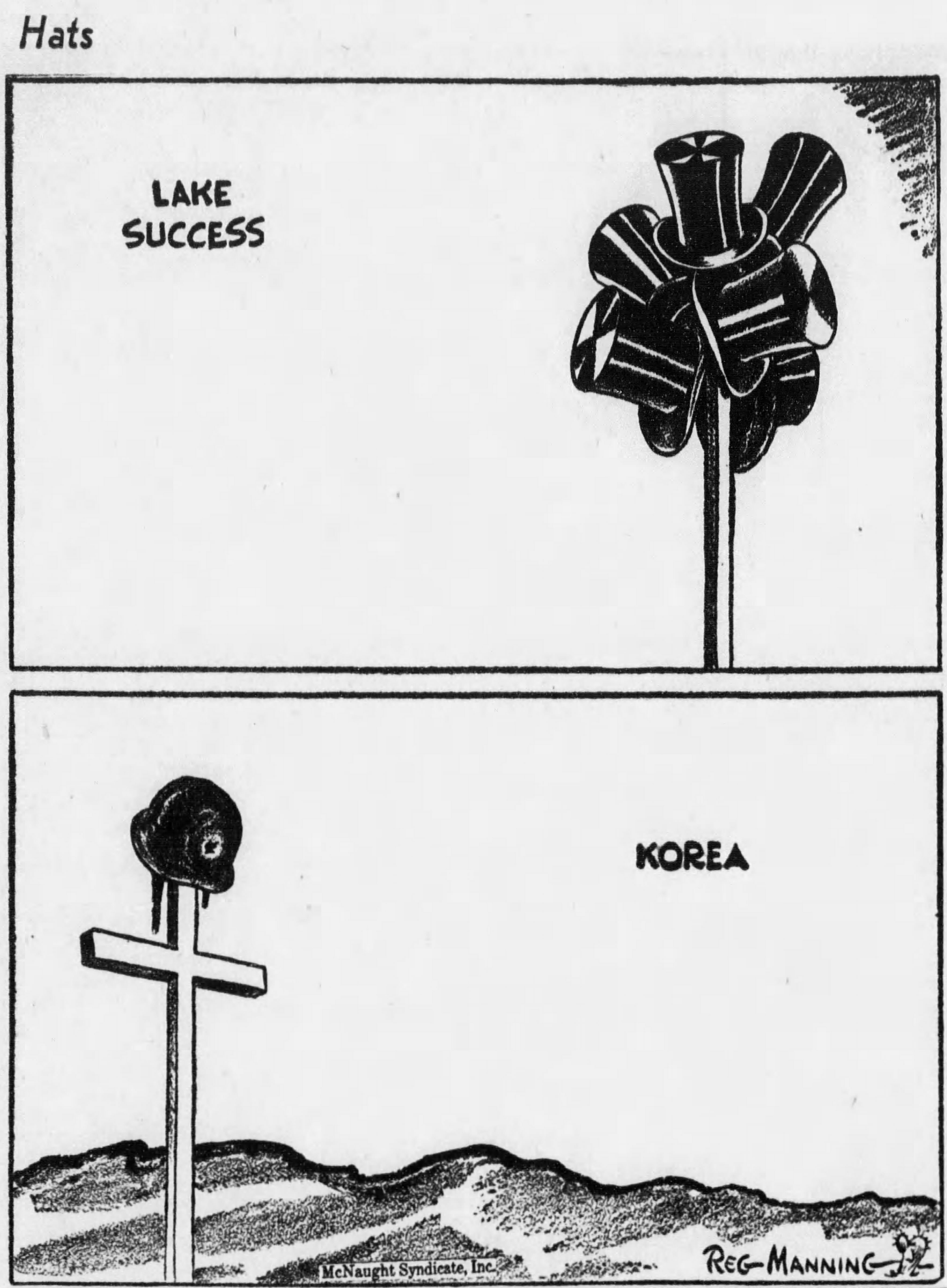
"Hats", for which Manning won the 1951 Pulitzer Prize for Editorial Cartooning.

Manning often used a small anthropomorphic cactus with a big nose as a visual signature. From 1948 until 1971, his work was syndicated by the McNaught Syndicate. In 1951, Manning won a Pulitzer Prize for Editorial Cartooning for an editorial cartoon entitled "Hats", which was a commentary on the Korean War.

Several of his books deal with Arizona and its cacti in particular, such as What Kinda Cactus Izzat? (also known as The Cactus Book), and What is Arizona Really Like?: A Guide to Arizona's Marvels.

Reg Manning did exceptional copper wheel engravings on crystal glass. See his book Desert in Crystal (1973). He also produced postcards, jewelry, stationery and water colors, all dealing with Western themes.

Manning died on March 10, 1986, in Scottsdale, Arizona.

His papers are held at Wichita State University, Arizona State University. and Syracuse University.

== Works ==
- Reg Manning's Cartoon Guide of Arizona, J. J. Augustine, 1938
- Reg Manning's Cartoon Guide of California, J. J. Augustine, 1939
- Reg Manning's cartoon guide of the Boulder dam country, J. J. Augustine, 1939
- What Kinda Cactus Izzat?, J. J. Augustine, 1941
- Little Itchy Itchy And Other Cartoons, J. J. Augustine, 1944
- From Tee to Cup, Reganson Cartoon Books, 1954
- What Is Arizona Really Like?, Reganson Cartoon Books, 1968
- Desert in Crystal, Reganson Cartoon Books, 1973
- Best of Reg, Reg Manning and Dean Smith, Arizona Republic, 1980
