= Ham Fisher =

American comic strip writer and cartoonist

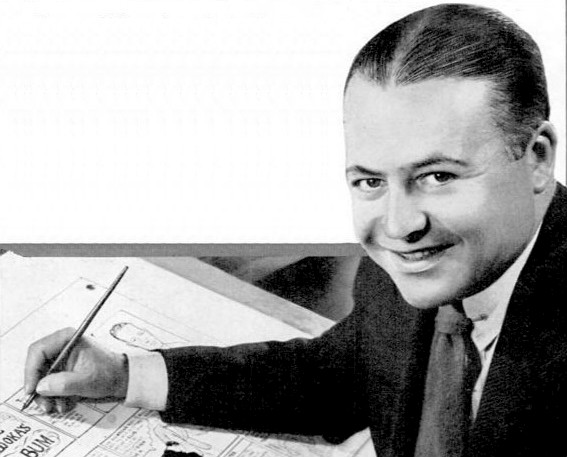
- Fisher in 1939
- Born: Hammond Edward Fisher cir. September 24, 1900 Wilkes-Barre, Pennsylvania, U.S.
- Died: December 27, 1955 (aged 55) New York City
- Area: Cartoonist
- Notable works: Joe Palooka

Hammond Edward "Ham" Fisher (September 24, 1900 [some sources indicate 1901] – December 27, 1955) was an American comic strip writer and cartoonist. He is best known for his long, popular run on Joe Palooka, which was launched in 1930 and ranked as one of the top five newspaper comics strips for several years.

== Biography ==
=== Early life and education ===
Born in Wilkes-Barre, Pennsylvania, Ham Fisher dropped out of school at the age of 16 to work as a brush peddler and truck driver before finding employment as a reporter and ad salesman for the Wilkes-Barre Record and then moving on to a job with the New York Daily News.

=== Joe Palooka ===
In 1920, Fisher put together a sample package of Joe Palooka (then titled Joe the Dumbbell) but was unable to attract interest. By 1927, he was working as a traveling strip salesman for the McNaught Syndicate. However, Fisher also hawked his own unpublished, unsold strip.

In 1928, after he secured over 20 sales, including to New York's Daily Mirror, Fisher informed his managers at McNaught, who decided to give Joe Palooka a trial run. The comic strip soon became a national success. The strip helped to solidify the word "palooka" as a boxer who lacks grace or ability, although the character Joe Palooka was the heavyweight champion. A dozen low-budget film adaptations of Joe Palooka appeared from the 1930s into the 1950s. Comic books featuring Joe Palooka began in 1933 and continued through the 1950s.

Bob Hope and Bing Crosby were drawn into this 1949 Joe Palooka strip by Ham Fisher and Moe Leff.

This topper strip by Ham Fisher ran above his Joe Palooka (July 22, 1945).

=== Feud with Al Capp ===
Searching for assistants to work on the strip, Fisher hired (among others) Al Capp, who later achieved fame as the writer-cartoonist of Li'l Abner. While ghosting on Joe Palooka, Capp claimed to have created the storyline about a stupid musclebound hillbilly named "Big Leviticus", an apparent prototype for the Li'l Abner character. When Capp quit Joe Palooka in 1934 to launch his own strip, Fisher badmouthed him to colleagues and editors, claiming that Capp had stolen his idea. For years, Fisher would bring the characters back to his strip, billing them as "the Original Hillbilly Characters" and advising readers not to be "fooled by imitations". Comics historians Denis Kitchen and Michael Schumacher have suggested that while there appears to be no definitive answer as to whether Capp or Fisher invented the hillbillies, they say there is reason to doubt that Capp ghosted several weeks of Joe Palooka strips entirely by himself.

The Capp-Fisher feud was well known in cartooning circles, and it became personal and vitriolic as Capp's strip eclipsed Joe Palooka in popularity. In the 1930s, to replace Capp, Fisher hired away Capp's top assistant, Moe Leff, along with Phil Boyle and a letterer. All three continued to work for Fisher for two decades. Fisher, Leff and Boyle all collaborated on the art, with Leff drawing the figures and Fisher doing the heads. Leff also contributed to scripting the strip.

After Fisher underwent plastic surgery, Capp once included a racehorse in Li'l Abner named Ham's Nose Bob. Traveling in the same social circles, the two men engaged in a 20-year mutual vendetta, as described in 1998 by Jay Maeder in the Daily News: "They crossed paths often, in the midtown watering holes and at National Cartoonists Society banquets, and the city's gossip columns were full of their snarling public donnybrooks."

In 1950, Capp wrote an article for The Atlantic entitled "I Remember Monster". The article recounted Capp's days working for an unnamed "benefactor" with a miserly, swinish personality, who Capp claimed was a never-ending source of inspiration when it came time to create a new unregenerate villain for his comic strip.

==== Retaliation ====
Fisher retaliated clumsily, falsely accusing Capp of sneaking obscenities into his comic strip. Submitting examples of Li'l Abner to United Feature Syndicate (Capp's syndicate) and to the New York courts, Fisher claimed pornographic images were hidden in the background art. Capp was able to refute the accusation by simply showing the original printed strips. According to the recollection of Fisher's friend Morris Weiss, "What Ham Fisher did was to take a lot of Li'l Abner strips that were suggestive. In one case, he cut off the end of one strip, which made it look more suggestive than others. He did not doctor any art on the strips... The story that Ham doctored the artwork came from Al Capp, of course." Capp's brother Elliot Caplin recalls the doctored strips as having been drawn upon, with additions of lines and shadows intended to simulate body parts.

In 1954, as Capp was applying for a Boston television license, the FCC received an anonymous packet of pornographic L'il Abner drawings. The National Cartoonists Society, an organization that Fisher had helped to found, convened an ethics hearing, and Fisher was expelled. Fisher became the only man ever sanctioned for "conduct unbecoming a cartoonist". Around the same time, Fisher's mansion in Carol Beach, Wisconsin was destroyed by a storm.

=== Death ===
On December 27, 1955, Fisher left his home for Moe Leff's studio, which Fisher had been using while Leff was out of town. Fisher telephoned his mother shortly after 1 pm, engaging in what police termed a "sentimental" conversation, and later in the evening, Fisher's concerned wife asked Weiss to check the studio, where Fisher's body was discovered just after 9 pm. Notes found by police indicated Fisher was despondent over his failing health and planned an overdose of medication. A will drawn up weeks before his death left an estate of $2.5 million to his wife Marilyn and daughter Wendy.

The feud between Fisher and Capp, and Fisher's suicide, was fictionalized with all names changed and many details altered in the mystery novel Strip for Murder by Max Allan Collins.

In 2023, Fisher was posthumously inducted into the Luzerne County Arts & Entertainment Hall of Fame. He was inducted as part of the Hall of Fame's inaugural class.
