= Santry (disambiguation) =

Santry is a suburb on the Northside of Dublin, Ireland.

Santry may also refer to:

- Santry (surname)
- Santry Court or Santry Desmsne a public park and former Georgian home and estate located in Dublin, Ireland
- Santry River, a small river on the north side of Dublin
- Santry Stadium or Morton Stadium an athletics stadium located in Santry, on the north of Dublin
