= Harry J. Tuthill =

American cartoonist

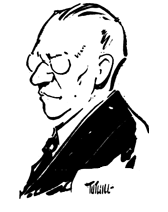
- 1919 self-portrait
- Born: May 10, 1885 Chicago, Illinois, U.S.
- Died: January 25, 1957 (aged 71)
- Notable works: The Bungle Family

Harry J. Tuthill (May 10, 1885 – January 25, 1957) was an American cartoonist best known for his comic strip The Bungle Family.

== Biography ==
Born in Chicago, Illinois, he grew up in the tenements and worked as a newsboy, quitting when a tough guy muscled in on his corner. At age 15, he traveled the midwest, finding employment with a foot surgeon, selling baking powder, patented eggbeaters and pictures, plus working as a medicine show barker in a street carnival. As he recalled, he left "to work on and at such things as selling enlarged pictures, soliciting for a corn doctor, and for one delirious season carrying on with a medicine show. I would not mention these things except that I feel what may be a pardonable pride in their diversity."

During his late teens, he settled in St. Louis, Missouri, where he was employed for $10 a week as a foreman at the St. Louis Dairy, where he washed milk cans for seven years.

By the age of 30, he still had not sold any cartoons. Finding encouragement on his artwork from Bob Grable of World Color Printing, he worked for the St. Louis Star and then moved to the St. Louis Post-Dispatch. He took night classes at Washington University in St. Louis, studying engineering and art, and signed on as a full-time cartoonist with the St. Louis Star during World War I, doing a strip titled Lafe about a lazy handyman, and attracting national attention for his editorial cartoons.

== Comic strips ==
In 1918, Tuthill launched Home Sweet Home, a strip about apartment life, in the New York Evening Mail. During the six-year run, it introduced George and Josephine Bungle, and he retitled it as The Bungle Family in 1924. Distributed initially by the McClure Syndicate and later by the McNaught Syndicate, the strip was carried by 120 newspapers. Comics historian Rick Marschall praised Tuthill's work, "Seldom has there been a strip (Moon Mullins comes to mind) registering a sustained, masterful indictment of petite-bourgeois sensibilities and preoccupations as did The Bungle Family."

He also drew Alice and Her Bothersome Little Brother and Napoleon Blunder during the 1920s. Little Brother ran as a topper strip to The Bungle Family. Tuthill's strips from 1919 to 1926 were created in his home studio at 4537 Tower Grove Place in St. Louis, eventually moving to Ferguson, Missouri outside St. Louis. His sister, Irene Morrisson, also lived in the St. Louis area.

Tuthill continued to draw The Bungle Family for McNaught until he had a dispute with the syndicate in 1939, which no longer carried the strip in 1942. After a hiatus, the strip returned — syndicated by Tuthill himself — on May 16, 1943, with newspapers running a promotional banner, "The Bungles Are Back!" It ran for two more years until 1945 when Tuthill retired.

In 1946, Tuthill applied for a U.S. patent for a "shading process." The detailed application, which Tuthill illustrated with a drawing of George Bungle shaded in various ways, stated that the "principal objects of the present invention are to devise a simple and economical process of quickly and easily applying such lines or shading to any fairly smooth and solid surface." This was the last of four lifetime patents that Tuthill was granted, approvals coming in 1935, 1937, 1938, and 1948. All these patents related to drawing.

He died of heart disease in 1957.

His son, Harold Tuthill, who worked for 47 years as a St. Louis Post-Dispatch sports writer, died of a heart ailment in 1988 at the age of 82.
