= Frank Jay Markey Syndicate =

Former print syndication service

- Industry: Comic strip syndication
- Founded: c. 1936; 89 years ago
- Founders: Frank J. Markey
- Defunct: c. 1950; 75 years ago
- Headquarters: New York City, U.S.
- Products: Comic strips

The Frank Jay Markey Syndicate was a small print syndication service that distributed comic strips and columns from the mid-1930s to c. 1950. Although small in size, the syndicate distributed strips by a number of notable cartoonists, including Ed Wheelan, Rube Goldberg, Boody Rogers, and Frank Borth. The syndicate also provided material for the burgeoning comic book industry, for companies like Quality Comics and Columbia Comics.

== History ==
Founder Frank Jay Markey was originally an executive with the McNaught Syndicate; he formed the syndicate to distribute his own column, eventually adding comic strips as well. The company's first strip was Rube Goldberg's Lala Palooza, followed by Bill Walsh and Ed Wheelan's Big Top.

In 1937, the Markey syndicate partnered with two other syndicates, the McNaught Syndicate and the Register and Tribune Syndicate, as well as with entrepreneur Everett M. "Busy" Arnold, to provide material for Arnold's Feature Funnies. In 1939, Cowles Media Company (the Register and Tribune Syndicate's corporate owner) and Arnold bought out the McNaught and Markey interests.

In 1940, Markey and the McNaught Syndicate made a similar partnership with artist/editor Vin Sullivan to form Columbia Comics.

The Markey syndicate made a bit of a splash in 1947 with Frank Borth's sea adventure daily strip Ken Stuart in 1947, but the strip was out of syndication a few years later, and with it went the syndicate.

== Frank J. Markey Syndicate strips and panels ==
- Big Top by Bill Walsh and Ed Wheelan (1937–1938)
- Bouford by Frank Borth (1949)
- Honey Dear by Johnny Devlin (December 6, 1937–August 27, 1938)
- Ken Stuart by Frank Borth (1947–1950)
- Lala Palooza by Rube Goldberg (1936–c. 1939)
- Sparky Watts by Boody Rogers (April 29, 1940–May 9, 1942)
