= Channel Chuckles =

American comic strip by Bil Keane

- Author: Bil Keane
- Current status/schedule: Concluded
- Launch date: February 15, 1954
- End date: 1976
- Syndicate(s): Register and Tribune Syndicate
- Genre(s): Television, Humor

Channel Chuckles is a television-themed comic panel created by Bil Keane which appeared in newspapers from 1954 through 1976. Keane received the National Cartoonists Society's 1976 Special Features Award for his work on the strip.

In its daily form, Channel Chuckles is a single-panel gag on the general theme of television, or specifically relating to a popular television series or TV commercial. The Sunday version of Channel Chuckles consists of several unrelated spot gags in color.

Most of the Channel Chuckles gags are simple wordplay references to the titles of contemporary television programs. For example, one gag shows a small TV set on top of a larger TV set, each of them displaying on its screen the title of a current TV sitcom. While the upper TV set showed Love on a Rooftop, the one underneath blared Hey, Landlord!.

One Channel Chuckles gag is a caricature of Mr. Spock from Star Trek receiving letters requesting advice on child-rearing (a reference to Doctor Benjamin Spock). Another Channel Chuckles gag depicts a mad scientist working in his laboratory while a nearby television intones the slogan of a current DuPont ad campaign: "Better Living Through Chemistry". Another familiar slogan is lampooned in a panel showing a little boy watching a General Electric commercial while his father says, "And progress is our most important product. Do your homework!"

Keane would sometimes subdivide the narrow space allotted to his Channel Chuckles feature in order to squeeze in two panels. One two-panel gag is based on the titles of two then-current TV series. In the first panel, a man asks his wife "Why can't you be more like that show?" while pointing to a TV set as it displays the title Occasional Wife. In the second panel, the wife points to the same TV while asking her husband "And why can't you be more like that show?". Her TV screen showed the title The Man Who Never Was.

Some gags feature "Aunt Tenna", a matronly woman with her hair done in the form of a TV antenna, who spends all of her time watching television or engaged in TV-related activities. The other recurring character in Channel Chuckles is "Dim Viewer", a grumpy old man who always has something negative to say about television programming, commercials or reception. Other gags poke fun at the genre of mother-daughter look-alikes television commercials of the late 1960s, such as the Grape-Nuts look-alikes, Mrs. Burke and her daughter Dale.
