= Columbia Comics =

American comic book company

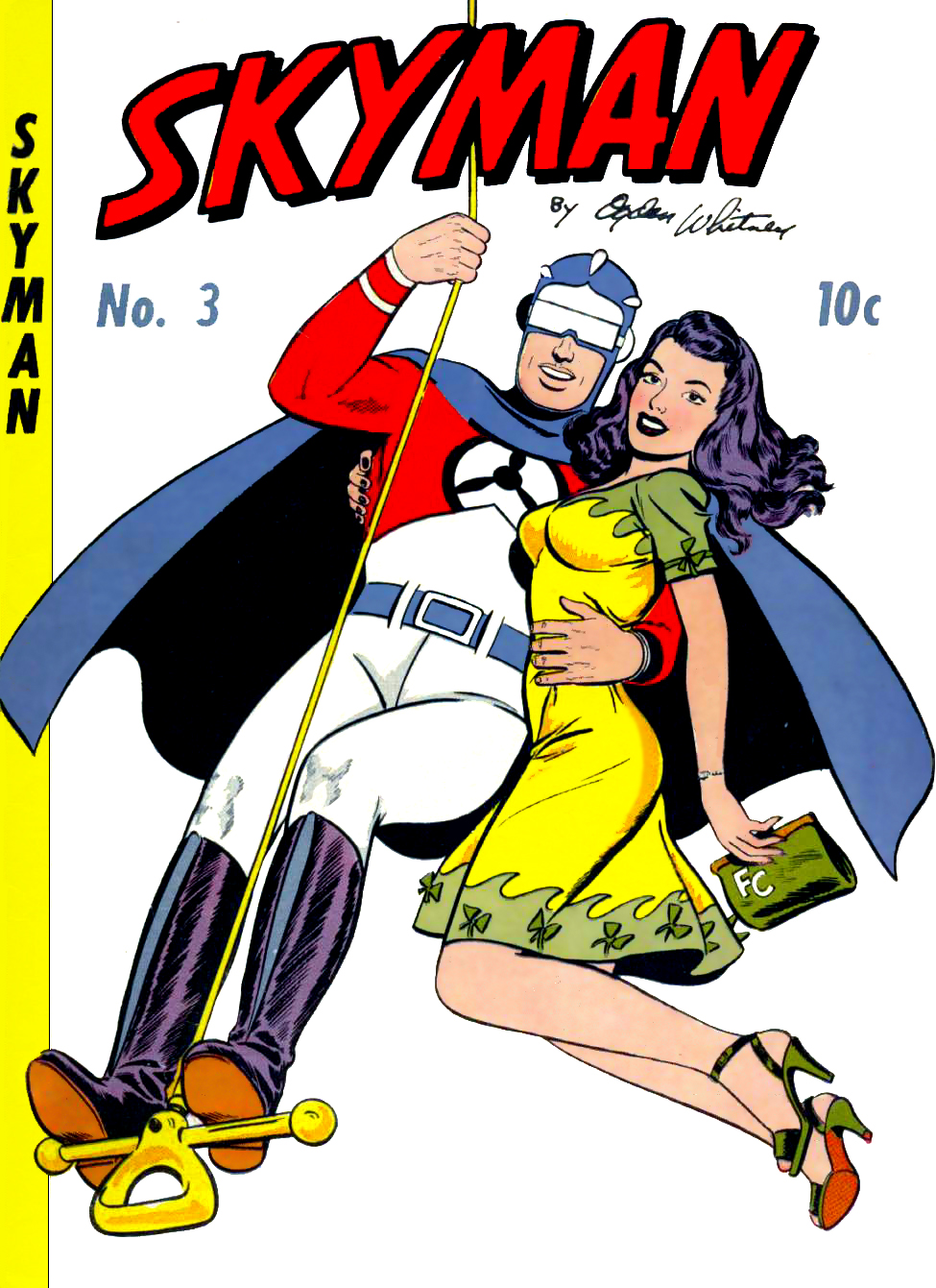
- Parent company: McNaught Newspaper Syndicate
- Founded: 1940; 85 years ago
- Founder: Vin Sullivan
- Defunct: 1949; 76 years ago
- Country of origin: United States
- Headquarters location: New York City
- Key people: Charles V. McAdam
- Publication types: Comic books
- Nonfiction topics: McNaught Syndicate and Frank Jay Markey Syndicate characters
- Fiction genres: Superhero, adventure, humor

Columbia Comics Corporation was a comic book publisher active in the 1940s whose best-known title was Big Shot Comics. Comics creators who worked for Columbia included Fred Guardineer, on Marvelo, the Monarch of Magicians; and Ogden Whitney and Gardner Fox on Skyman.

== History ==
Columbia Comics was formed in 1940 as a partnership between artist/editor Vin Sullivan, the McNaught Syndicate, and the Frank Jay Markey Syndicate to publish comic books featuring reprints of such McNaught and Markey comic strips as Joe Palooka, Charlie Chan, and Sparky Watts, as well as original features. Other properties published by Eastern Color Printing are also transferred to Columbia Comics. Eastern appears to have subsequently retained a close relationship with Columbia, running advertisements for Columbia books in their own comic book titles.

Columbia Comics' first published title was the anthology title Big Shot Comics, the premiere of which introduced Skyman and The Face. Big Shot Comics would run for 104 issues until 1949, when Columbia went out of business. Other titles published by Columbia included spinoff series from Big Shot Comics featuring Skyman (four issues) and The Face.

Charles V. McAdam, president of the McNaught Syndicate, was also publisher of Columbia Comics.

== Titles ==
- Big Shot Comics (104 issues, 1940–1949)
- Dixie Dugan (13 issues, July 1942 – 1949) — McNaught Syndicate strip
- The Face (2 issues, 1941–1942)
- Joe Palooka (4 issues, 1942–1944) — McNaught Syndicate strip
- Ken Stuart (1 issue, 1948) — Markey Syndicate strip by Frank Borth
- Mickey Finn (12 issues, [February] 1944–1949) — McNaught Syndicate strip
- Skyman (4 issues, 1941, 1942, 1947, and 1948)
- Sparky Watts (10 issues, 1942–1949) — Markey Syndicate strip by Boody Rogers
- Tony Trent (2 issues, 1948)
