= The Bungle Family =

1918-1945 American comic strip

- Author: Harry J. Tuthill
- Current status/schedule: Daily and Sunday; concluded
- Launch date: 1918
- End date: June 2, 1945
- Alternate name(s): Home, Sweet Home
- Syndicate(s): McClure Newspaper Syndicate (1919–1924); McNaught Syndicate (1924–1942); Self-syndicated (1943–1945)
- Publisher: Eastern Color Printing
- Genre(s): Humor; gag-a-day

The Bungle Family is an American gag-a-day comic strip, created by Harry J. Tuthill, that first appeared in 1918. Originally titled Home, Sweet Home, it first appeared as part of a series of rotating strips in the New York Evening Mail. The strip ran until June 2, 1945.

In 1999, The Bungle Family was voted one of the Top 100 English language comics of the 20th Century by The Comics Journal. Art Spiegelman praised The Bungle Family as "Visually deadpan, genuinely hilarious once you tune into its frequency, with a great ear for dialogue and an unsurpassed sense of character". Spiegelman also described the strip as "one of the darkest visions of American life this side of Nathanael West."

== Publication history ==
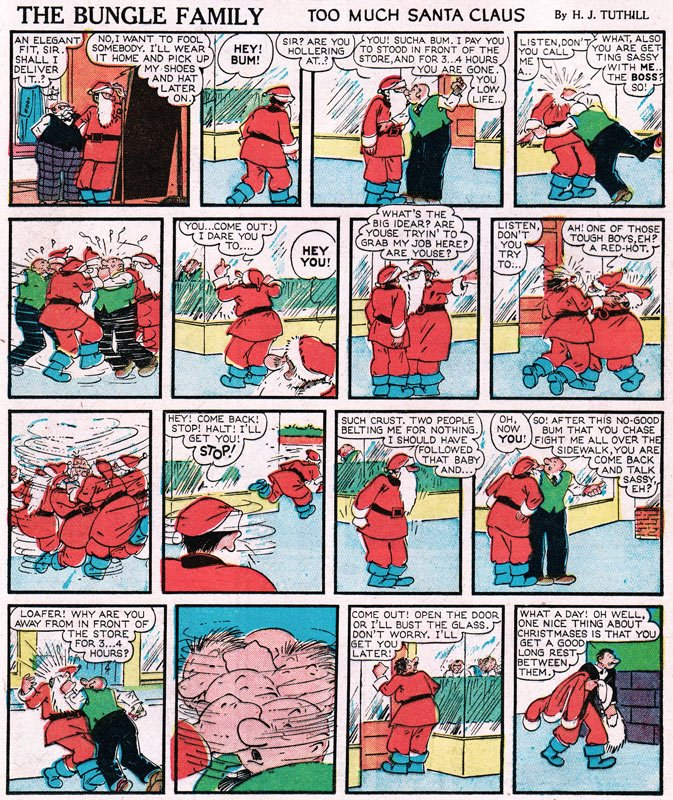
Harry J. Tuthill's The Bungle Family

Seen only sporadically in 1918, the strip was published daily and was nationally syndicated with the McClure Newspaper Syndicate by the end of 1919. Home, Sweet Home followed the adventures of Mabel (later Josephine) and George, a young couple beset on all sides by in-laws, neighbors and businessmen.

Tuthill took the strip to the McNaught Syndicate when the Evening Mail was sold in 1924, changing the name to The Bungle Family and adding daughter Peggy Bungle to the cast. A Sunday page was in existence by September 9, 1923.

Tuthill continued to draw The Bungle Family for McNaught until he had a dispute with the syndicate in 1939. This led to Tuthill ending the strip on August 1, 1942. After a hiatus, the strip returned — syndicated by Tuthill himself — on May 16, 1943, with newspapers running a promotional banner, "The Bungles Are Back!" It ran for two more years until June 2, 1945, when Tuthill retired.

The Bungle Family Sunday page had three different toppers during the run: Little Brother (Oct 24, 1926 - March 28, 1937), Another Day Shot (1936) and Short Stories (April 4, 1937 - 1938).

== Characters and story ==
Called "the finest, most inventive and socially critical of the family strips" by comics historian Bill Blackbeard, The Bungle Family was a popular domestic comedy that emphasized dialogue and realistic situations. The titular patriarch of the strip, long-suffering, cantankerous George Bungle, voiced the petty frustrations and joys of the common man during the Jazz Age and through the Depression.

Comics historian Don Markstein described life among the Bungles:

George was skinny, middle-aged, cucumber-nosed and mustachioed, sort of like A. Mutt, Andy Gump or the self-caricatures of R. Crumb. Josie was his equivalent, not a dowdy old frump, but about as comfortably domestic looking as Mutt's or Andy's wife, or to cite a more recent example, Mrs. Ferd'nand. They were typical lower middle class city people of the time, living in a walk-up apartment and having frequent run-ins with the landlord, bill collectors, neighbors and most of all, each other. George and Jo would fight over practically anything. Their disputes frequently went on for hours, provoked noise complaints to the police, dragged the neighbors in, or all three. They were not very likable, and certainly not high-minded. But they were funny. Through them, Tuthill displayed a sort of amused contempt for the more petty concerns of ordinary urban life. The Bungles weren't the sort of folks most people would want to live downstairs from, but they were very much capable of providing entertainment for those who didn't have to put up with them in person.

In the mid-1930s, Tuthill serialized exotic adventures and introduced a large supporting cast over the next several years—moves that were accompanied by a huge surge of public interest in the strip. Around this time, Tuthill began incorporating fantasy and time travel into the strip.

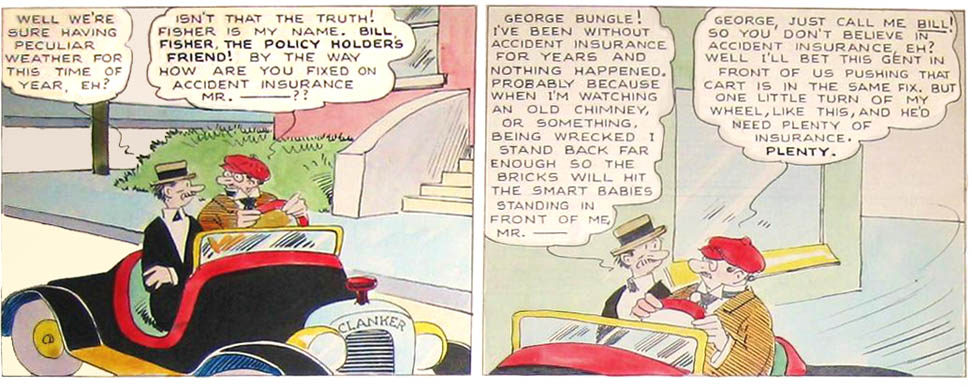
Harry J. Tuthill's The Bungle Family (June 13, 1926), hand-colored original art

== Reprints ==
Reprints of the strip were first featured in the comic book Famous Funnies beginning with its first issue in 1934. In 2006, it was announced that Spec Publications, a Colorado-based publisher of classic comics, planned to reprint The Bungle Family in collected editions.

In 2014, The Library of American Comics published a year of The Bungle Family (1930) in their LoAC Essentials series.

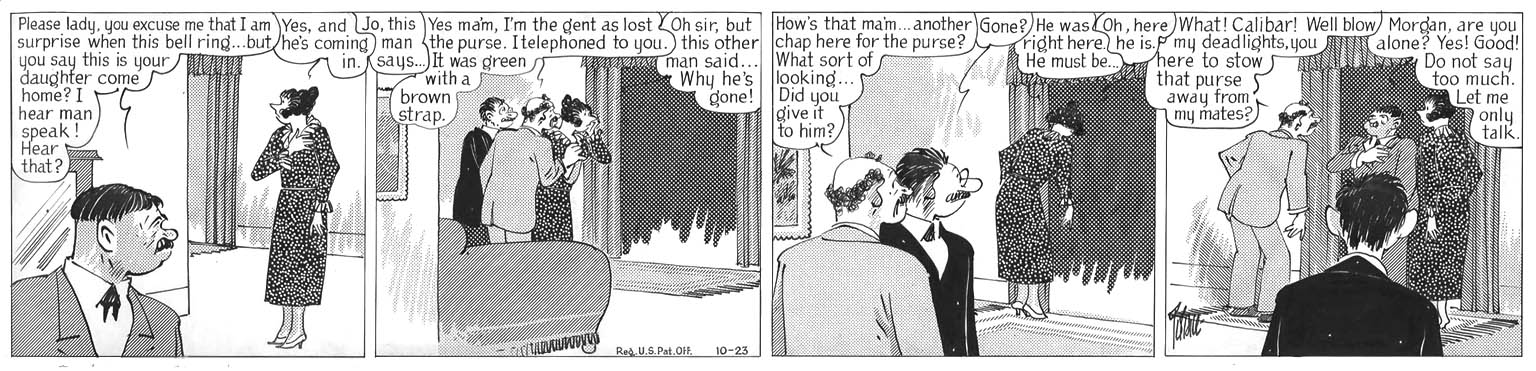
Harry J. Tuthill's The Bungle Family
