= Face (character) =

Superhero from Columbia Comics

The Face
- The Face, as he appears in Project Superpowers.

Publication information
- Publisher: Columbia Comics
- First appearance: Big Shot Comics #1 (May 1940)
- Created by: Mart Bailey

In-story information
- Alter ego: Tony Trent
- Species: Human
- Place of origin: Earth
- Abilities: Originally: Scare enemies with his mask Expert unarmed combatant and swordsman Excellent marksman Currently: Ability to cause terrifying hallucinations with his mask

The Face is a superhero that appeared in 1940s comic books during what historians and fans call the Golden Age of Comic Books. He was created by artist Mart Bailey and an unknown writer.

The Face is radio announcer Tony Trent, who decides to fight crime after having witnessed a murder committed by gangsters disguised as cops. Having no innate superpowers, he instead uses a grotesque green mask to scare criminals, not unlike Batman. With issue #63, he no longer wears the mask and fights crime as himself.

== Publication history ==
I always liked the design of a character that has that Creeper-like quality of being a ‘good guy’ Joker. And so the effect of a man with a monster face and a tuxedo is just such a simple, cool idea that I want to take this character and do something with him—where the effect of his face has a surreal quality on people much like Count Vertigo, where it sort of throws you off in a scarecrow-like manner once he enters the room. You’re actually terrorized by the effect of that mask.

— Alex Ross

The Face first appeared in the Columbia Comics omnibus title Big Shot Comics #1 (May 1940) and continued until issue #62 (January 1946). By 1947, the shock value had worn off. From issue #63 the feature continued as "Tony Trent" until Big Shot #104, the final issue of the series. Apart from appearing in Big Shot, The Face also had two issues of his own title (1941–1942), as well as two as Tony Trent (1948).

Originally created by Mart Bailey, the character wore a frightening green mask, with flaming red hair, a vampire's white fangs and ghoulish yellow eyes. Underneath the mask was a deep blue tuxedo, which gave him more class. His alter ego was Tony Trent. Tony's outgoing personality made him perfect for his job at a broadcasting station.

According to Jess Nevins' Encyclopedia of Golden Age Superheroes, "The Face fights ordinary criminals, gold-makers, the Hook, and even the Japanese when the Face frees the Flying Tigers from a Japanese ship".

In the 1980s, new stories were published by Ron Frantz' Ace Comics. Three issues of What Is... The Face? were published.

After the Face passed into the public domain, a character heavily based on him, called Mr. Face, was introduced for the 2008 limited series Project Superpowers, published by Dynamite Entertainment.

== Project Superpowers ==
At some point after World War II, The Fighting Yank persuades Trent to don his mask just one more time, immediately after which the Yank traps him in the mystical Urn of Pandora, as part of a misguided quest to end all evil on Earth. Decades later, the Urn is broken and all the prisoners are freed, although some of them are now changed. The Face discovers that anyone who looks at his masked face now experiences hallucinations of whatever they fear most.

== Powers and abilities ==
The Face has no superpowers, usually relying on his masked appearance to scare his opponents. Later he developed an expertise in unarmed combat, and was an excellent marksman with a mastery with most weapons as well as being an expert swordsman.

Mr. Face has the ability to make his opponents experience their worst fears while looking at his masked face.
