= McNaught Syndicate =

American newspaper syndicate between 1922 and 1989

- Type: Syndication
- Industry: Media
- Founded: 1922; 104 years ago
- Founders: Virgil Venice McNitt and Charles V. McAdam
- Defunct: September 1989; 37 years ago
- Fate: Folded
- Headquarters: New York City, United States
- Key people: Charles Benedict Driscoll (1925–1951)
- Services: Columns and comic strips

First episode of Alfred Andriola's Charlie Chan Sunday comic strip (October 30, 1938), distributed by the McNaught Syndicate. The daily strip began earlier that week (October 24, 1938).

The McNaught Syndicate was an American newspaper syndicate founded in 1922. It was established by Virgil Venice McNitt (who gave it his name) and Charles V. McAdam. Its best known contents were the columns by Will Rogers and O. O. McIntyre, the Dear Abby letters section and comic strips, including Joe Palooka and Heathcliff. It folded in September 1989.

== History ==
Virgil McNitt (1881–1964) first tried his hand at publishing a magazine, the McNaught Magazine, which failed. He then, in 1910, started the Central Press Association syndication service, with offices in Cleveland, Ohio. In 1920, McNitt founded the Central Press Association of New York City. (Although both services had the same name, they were separate operations.)

In 1922, McNitt and Charles V. McAdam (1892–1985) absorbed the operations of the New York City Central Press Association and co-founded the McNaught Syndicate, with headquarters in The New York Times building. Will Rogers' weekly column started in 1922 in 25 newspapers. By 1926, his daily column ran in 92 newspapers, and it reached 400 papers three years later, making him one of the best paid and most read columnists of the United States at the time.

From 1925 until 1951, Charles Benedict Driscoll was one of the editors and contributors for the syndicate.

Writers syndicated by McNaught in those first years included Paul Gallico, Dale Carnegie, Walter Winchell and Irvin S. Cobb. By the early 1930s, the McNaught Syndicate had a stable which included columnists O. O. McIntyre and Al Smith and at one time even syndicated a letter by Albert Einstein.

Other successes included columns by Dale Carnegie and Dear Abby by Abigail Van Buren. At the time of McNitt's death in 1964, the syndicate was still led by McAdam, providing contents to 1,000 newspapers.

By 1987, McNaught had only 24 features left, making it the tenth largest comic strip syndicate in the United States at that time. The syndicate eventually folded in September 1989.

== Comic strips ==
One of the first syndicated artists was Rube Goldberg. McNaught's line-up of comic strips included Mickey Finn and Dixie Dugan. Ham Fisher's Joe Palooka was at first rejected by McNitt, but Fisher was hired as a salesman for the syndicate, offering McNaught's features to newspapers. After having sold his comic to 20 newspapers, McNitt had to change his opinion and added Joe Palooka to the syndicate, becoming one of the big successes for it.

By the mid-1930s, McNaught's stable of cartoonists included Fisher, John H. Striebel, and Gus Mager.

In 1933, just as the concept of "comic books" was getting off the ground, Eastern Color Printing published Funnies on Parade, which reprinted in color several comic strips licensed from the McNaught Syndicate, the Ledger Syndicate, Associated Newspapers, and the Bell Syndicate, including Ham Fisher's Joe Palooka. Eastern Color neither sold this periodical nor made it available on newsstands, but rather sent it out free as a promotional item to consumers who mailed in coupons clipped from Procter & Gamble soap and toiletries products. The company printed 10,000 copies, and it was a great success.

In 1937, the McNaught Syndicate partnered with Frank J. Markey (formerly a McNaught executive) and the Register and Tribune Syndicate, as well as with entrepreneur Everett M. "Busy" Arnold, to provide material to the burgeoning comic book industry. For this reason, from 1937 until 1939, many of the syndicate's comic strips were reprinted in the comic book anthology Feature Funnies (published by Arnold). In 1939, Cowles Media Company (the Register and Tribune Syndicate's corporate owner) and Arnold bought out the McNaught and Markey interests.

In 1939, the syndicate hired Vin Sullivan, then editor of Action Comics, to start a new comics publishing company, Columbia Comics, which would carry both new comics and reprints of McNaught syndicated comics like Joe Palooka. The company existed until 1949 and is best remembered for their publication Big Shot Comics.

The syndicate continued columns and strips which were already successful when acquired, but it also was active in creating and suggesting new content, from the Will Rogers columns to comic strips like Don Dean's Cranberry Boggs. In one case, McNitt supported a crossover between the comic strips Joe Palooka and Dixie Dugan, a feat which was commented upon by Editor & Publisher.

Their last success came with the comic strip Heathcliff, which they syndicated from the start in 1973 until the late 1980s. Heathcliff appeared in some 1,000 newspapers, and the McNaught Syndicate became the production company for a few Heathcliff movies, including Heathcliff: The Movie from 1986.

== Main syndicated content ==
=== Columns ===
This shows how McNaught's Dixie Dugan and Joe Palooka appeared in the comics section of the weekly Grit newspaper. Grit published Sunday strips in black-and-white rather than color. (The Donald Duck comic at the bottom was distributed by King Features.)

- Holmes Moss Alexander, from 1947 until 1981
- Jimmy Fidler with Jimmy Fiddler in Hollywood, a gossip column carried by 187 newspapers
- Sir Philip Gibbs and Hendrik Willem van Loon, both reporting on the Second World War
- The Great Game of Politics by Frank Richardson Kent, appearing in 140 newspapers in 1934
- Alice Roosevelt Longworth, appearing in 100 newspapers in 1936
- The Lyons Den by Leonard Lyons, taken over from the King Features Syndicate in 1941: appeared in some 20 newspapers
- New York Day by Day by O. O. McIntyre, "probably the most widely read columnist in the U.S.", appeared in some 400 newspapers After McIntyre's death in 1938, the column was continued by editor Charles Driscoll until 1951.
- The State of The Nation by professor Raymond Moley
- Dear Abby by Pauline Phillips was syndicated by McNaught from 1956 until 1966, when it was taken over by the Chicago Tribune syndicate By 1957, it ran in about 80 newspapers.
- "Will Rogers Says", a daily column by Will Rogers, appearing in 500 newspapers by 1935
- Eleanor Roosevelt in 1934, with limited success
- Louis Rukeyser, economic columnist, from 1976 to 1986
- Major Alexander Procofieff de Seversky, syndicated in 85 newspapers
- a weekly feature by Al Smith between 1931 and 1932: appeared in some 70 newspapers by 1931
- New York by John Cameron Swayze, appearing in 50 newspapers in 1951
- Pull Up Chair by Neal O'Hara (1935–1938)
- Andrew Tully, from 1969 on, with more than 150 subscribing newspapers
- Walter Winchell

=== Comic strips and cartoons ===
In addition to the list below, cartoons by Rube Goldberg and editorial cartoons by Reg Manning from 1948 to 1971, winner of the Pulitzer Prize for Editorial Cartooning in 1951

- Boob McNutt, by Rube Goldberg (1922–1934) — acquired from King Features where it was launched in 1915; appeared in over 200 newspapers
- The Bungle Family by Harry J. Tuthill, created in 1918, syndicated by McNaught from 1924 until 1942
- Charlie Chan by Alfred Andriola (1938–1942) — an adaptation of the novels
- Cranberry Boggs by Don Dean (1945–1949)
- Dan Flagg by Don Sherwood (April 22, 1963–c. 1966) — moved to Bell-McClure Syndicate, where it lasted another year or so
- Dixie Dugan by J. P. McEvoy and John H. Striebel (1929–1966)
- The Flintstones by Gene Hazelton and Roger Armstrong (October 2, 1961–1988) — later continued by Karen Machette and the Editors Press Service until the late 1990s
- Gunther by John Roman (1980–1982)
- Heathcliff by George Gately, created in 1973, was originally syndicated by McNaught before switching to Tribune Media Services and later Creators Syndicate
- Hoosegow Herman by Abian A. "Wally" Wallgren (1938–c. 1939) — appeared in 22 newspapers
- The Jackson Twins by Dick Brooks (1950–1979)
- Joe Palooka originally by Ham Fisher (1930–1984) — appeared in some 650 newspapers in 1959
- Johnny Comet by Frank Frazetta and Earl Baldwin (1952–1953)
- Mickey Finn by Lank Leonard (1936–1976) — ran at its peak in more than 300 newspapers
- Middle Class Animals by Hugh Laidman (May 18, 1970 – May 13, 1972)
- Mortimer Snurd and Charlie McCarthy by Ben Batsford (1939)
- Oliver's Adventures by Gus Mager (May 1926 – October 22 1934)
- Olly of the Movies by Julian Ollendorff (January 22, 1934-1937; moved to Consolidated News Features and then Associated Features, where it finally ended c. February 1946)
- This Funny World (1945–1985) — gag cartoons by numerous creators
- Toonerville Folks by Fontaine Fox (1908–1955) — acquired from Bell Syndicate c. 1930; when syndicated by McNaught, it ran in about 300 newspapers
- Windy Riley by Ken Kling (c. 1926–1932)
- Yogi Bear by Gene Hazelton (February 5, 1961–1988)
