= Bob Barnes (cartoonist) =

American cartoonist (1913–1970)

- Born: Robert Leslie Barnes; March 8, 1913 Portland, Oregon, U.S.
- Died: November 12, 1970 (aged 57) Carmel Valley, California, U.S.
- Area: Cartoonist
- Notable works: The Better Half (1956–1971)
- Awards: National Cartoonist Society Newspaper Panel Cartoon Award, 1958
- Spouse: Ruth

Robert Leslie Barnes (March 8, 1913 – November 12, 1970) was an American comic strip artist most notable for his marriage-themed gag panel The Better Half.

Barnes' first syndicated panel was Laugh of the Week / Laff of the Week from 1947 to 1951 succeeded by Double-Take from 1952 to 1957. Barnes launched The Better Half with the Register and Tribune Syndicate in 1956, doing the strip until his death from cancer on November 12, 1970. A few strips appeared after his death, continuing until 1971.

He received the National Cartoonists Society Newspaper Panel Cartoon Award for The Better Half in 1958.

== Personal life ==
His wife, Ruth, collaborated with him on his work, and took over writing The Better Half upon his demise.
