= J. P. McEvoy =

American dramatist

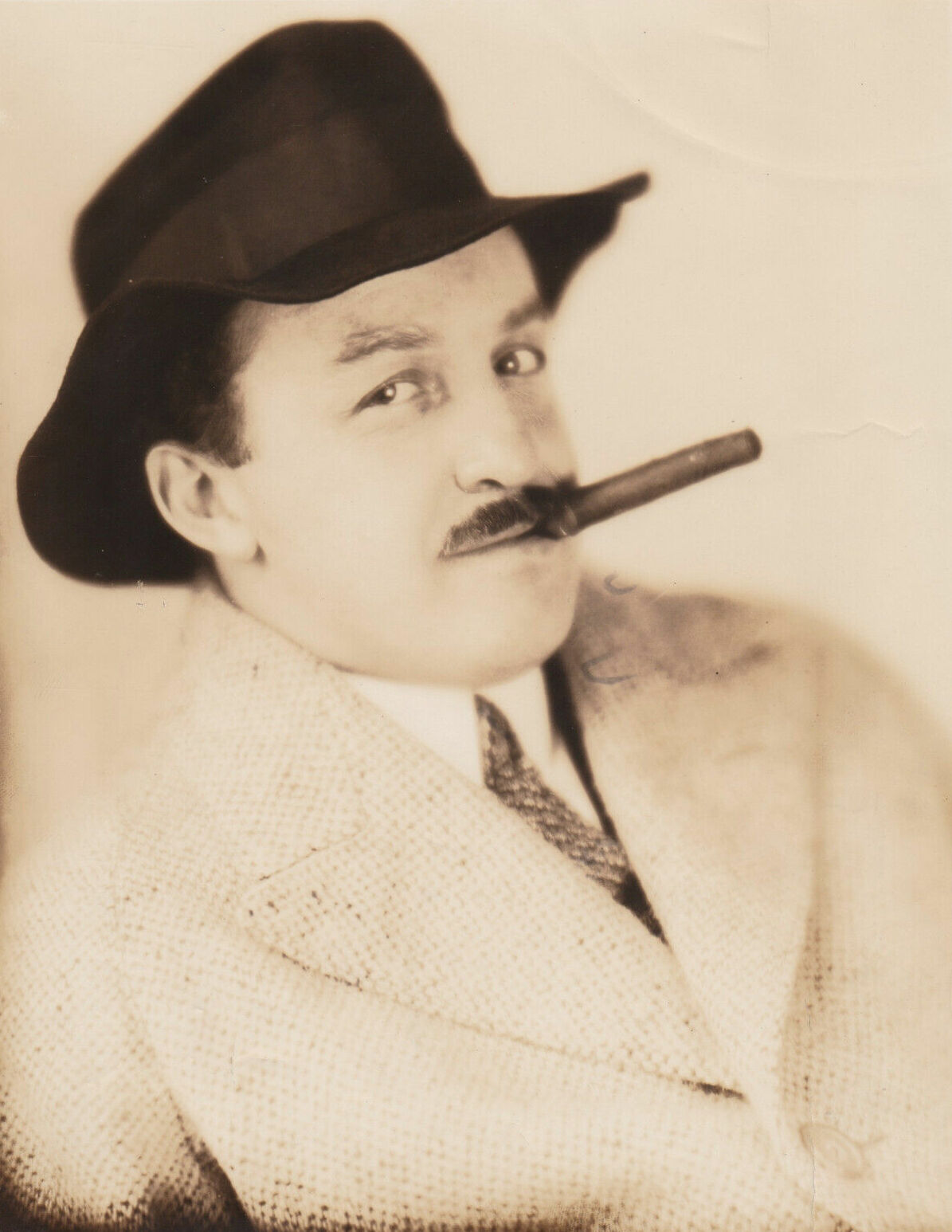
- McEvoy, c. 1928
- Born: December 21, 1894
- Died: August 8, 1958 (aged 63)
- Occupation: Writer

Joseph Patrick McEvoy (December 21, 1894 – August 8, 1958) was an American writer whose stories were published during the 1920s and 1930s in popular magazines such as Liberty, The Saturday Evening Post and Cosmopolitan.

== Career ==
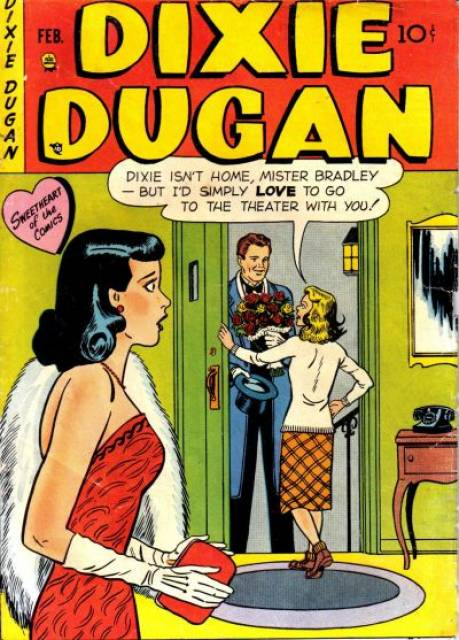
J. P. McEvoy's Dixie Dugan (1951)

An orphan, McEvoy told the Rockford Morning Star later in life that he didn't “remember where he was born—but he has been told that it was New York City and that the year was 1894.” Newspaper comic historian Alex Jay, who records that remark, gives a number of possible birthdates ranging from 1894 to 1897, but McEvoy's birth certificate reads 21 December 1894. He worked as an editor for the P. F. Volland Company in 1919 and publicly commented on the death of the firm's founder, Paul Frederick Volland.

In 1920 the P.F. Volland Company published a children's fairy story written by McEvoy, which was illustrated by Johnny Gruelle, creator of Raggedy Ann. In the story a lazy little girl, named Dorothy Mary, interacts with, and is taught by the Fairy Queen and a bevy of tiny fairies by means of the "Bam Bam Clock". She learns how to pay attention to schedules, and thus not be late for meals, bed-time, and the such. The story was illustrated in color with drawings by Gruelle. Raggedy Ann is mentioned a few times in the story, and within the pictures are five depictions of Raggedy Ann. This is one of the earliest mentions of Raggedy Ann in a story outside of the "Raggedy Ann" series. The book was later picked up by Algonquin Publishing Co. (circa 1936).

Many of his stories were adapted to movies during this period, including It's a Gift (1934) starring W.C. Fields.

McEvoy also had a hit play, The Potters (1923), contributed to the Ziegfeld Follies and wrote a number of novels, including Show Girl (1928) and Hollywood Girl (1929). McEvoy's experiences working for the P. F. Volland Company are reflected in the Show Girl character of Denny Kerrigan, who was working for the Gleason Greeting Card Company. Denny is the protagonist of McEvoy's third novel, Denny and the Dumb Cluck (1930).

Show Girl and Hollywood Girl were adapted into the movies Show Girl (1928) and Show Girl in Hollywood (1930), both starring Alice White. He also wrote the books and lyrics for the musical revue, Americana which opened on Broadway in 1926 and was revived in 1928 and 1932.

McEvoy is perhaps best known as the creator and writer of the popular newspaper comic strip Dixie Dugan, based on Show Girl, which had been serialized in a national magazine with illustrations by John H. Striebel, who continued on as the illustrator of the comic strip. With the title character resembling actress Louise Brooks, the strip was distributed by the McNaught Syndicate and had a long run from 1929 to 1966. McEvoy had previously written a syndicated feature called "Slams of Life"; a collection of these columns was published under the same title in 1919, with the promise "with malice for all and charity toward none." In 2003, James Curtis described the writer's outlook and approach: "In McEvoy's world, nothing ever worked the way it was supposed to and the poor working schlepp always took it in the shorts."

McEvoy was the originator of the quote often attributed to Mark Twain: "Whenever the impulse to exercise comes over me, I lie down until it passes away". He also is credited as the originator of the phrase, "Cut to the chase", in 1928.

During the 1940s and 1950s, he was a regular contributor to the Reader's Digest.

McEvoy had four children: Dorothy and Dennis with his first wife, and Patricia and Margaret with his third wife, New York journalist Margaret Santry.

== Works ==
=== Novels ===
- Show Girl (1928)
- Hollywood Girl (1929)
- Denny and the Dumb Cluck (1930)
- Mister Noodle: An Extravaganza (1931)
- Society (1931)
- Are You Listening? (1932)
- The Dixie Dugan Trilogy (2024: Show Girl/Hollywood Girl/Society)

=== Plays ===
- The Potters (1923)
- God Loves Us (1926)

=== Revues ===
- The Comic Supplement (1924)
- Ziegfeld Follies (1924–26)
- Americana (1926)
- No Foolin' (1926)
- Allez-Oop! (1927)
- New Americana (1932)

=== Poetry ===
- Slams of Life (1919)
- The Sweet Dry and Dry (1919)
- Live Wires in Their Line in Cartoon and Rhyme (1923)

=== Children’s Book ===
- The Bam Bam Clock (1920)

=== Nonfiction ===
- Father Meets Son (1937)
- Charlie Would Have Loved This (1956)
