= Big Shot Comics =

American comic book series

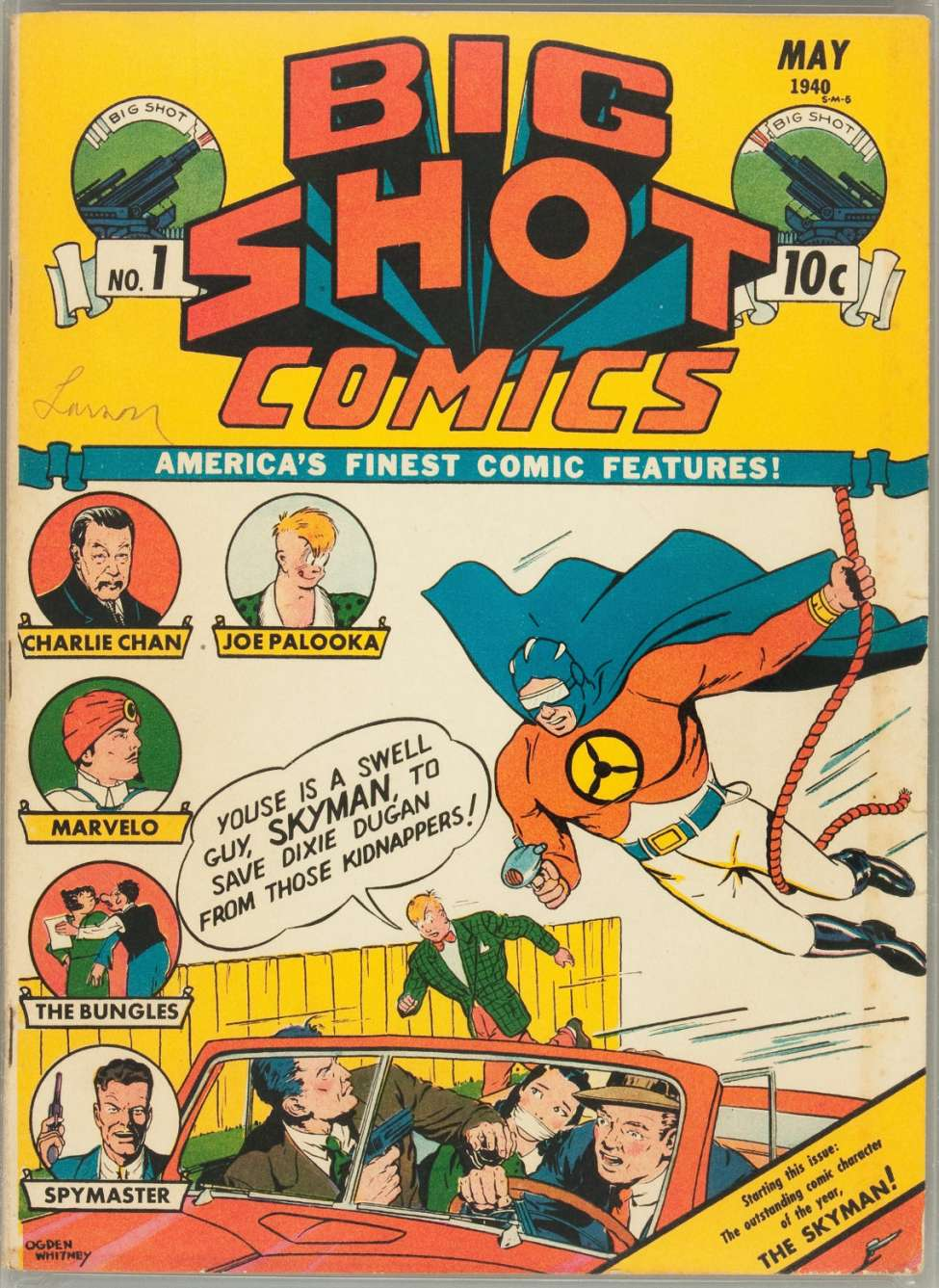
- Big Shot Comics #1 (May 1940). Cover art by Ogden Whitney.

Publication information
- Publisher: Columbia Comics
- Schedule: Monthly
- Format: Ongoing
- Publication date: May 1940 – August 1949
- No. of issues: 104
- Main character(s): Skyman, Spy-Master, Sparky Watts, Dixie Dugan, Joe Palooka, Charlie Chan

Big Shot Comics was an American comic book series published by Columbia Comics during the period in the 1940s that fans and historians refer to as the Golden Age of comic books. An anthology title, the series included a mix of superheroes, costumed crimefighters, crusading district attorneys, heroic magicians and others, both in original stories and in reprinted newspaper comic strips from the McNaught Syndicate, including Dixie Dugan, Joe Palooka, and the movie series spin-off Charlie Chan.

== Publication history ==
Big Shot ran 104 issues, cover-dated May 1940 to August 1949. With issue #30 (Dec. 1942), the title was shortened to simply Big Shot.

== Overview ==
Original characters included The Face, Sparky Watts, Skyman, Brass Knuckles, Marvelo and Spy-Master.

Although the character Skyman was intended to be the leader of the title, the character did not have the star power that the publisher hoped for. Sparky Watts, a superhero parody character created by Boody Rogers, started in issue 14, and judging by the number of covers and solo books, had the highest popularity.
