= The Incredible Hulk (comic strip) =

Comic strip running 1978–1982

- Current status/schedule: Concluded
- Launch date: October 30, 1978
- End date: September 5, 1982
- Syndicate(s): King Features Syndicate
- Genre(s): Superhero

The Incredible Hulk is a syndicated newspaper strip, which debuted on October 30, 1978 and ran until September 5, 1982 by King Features Syndicate.

== The strip ==
Initially written by Stan Lee and drawn by Larry Lieber, this strip modeled its version of the character after the television series airing at the time, with Banner's first name being given as "David", the McGee character, and a "wandering man" format. Although the depiction of the Hulk matched the comic books in terms of visual design, he did not speak dialog which is akin to the television version of the character. Lieber took over both writing and artwork soon after the strip launched. He later turned over art chores to first Rich Buckler (starting in Spring 1979) and then Alan Kupperberg (starting in November 1979), who also wrote the strip in its final months. The newspaper credits were slow to reflect changes in the creative team; Stan Lee, for instance, continued to appear in the byline for months after he had given up working on the strip.

== Chapter guide ==
Chapter	Fan title	Start date	End date
1	To Clone a Hulk	1978-10-30	1978-12-18
2	Rage and Revenge	1978-12-19	1979-02-25
3	The Mechanical Hulk	1979-02-26	1979-05-13
4	Jailbreak!	1979-05-14	1979-06-24
5	The Union Election	1979-06-25	1979-09-30
6	The Secret of the Hulk	1979-10-01	1979-12-09
7	The Big Top	1979-12-10	1980-02-25
8	Blind Compassion	1980-02-26	1980-05-18
9	Murdock Mountain	1980-05-19	1980-08-03
10	The Champ	1980-08-04	1980-11-09
11	Amnesia	1980-11-10	1981-02-15
12	Controlling the Beast	1981-02-16	1981-05-31
13	The Gangsters	1981-06-01	1981-09-14
14	The Alien	1981-09-15	1981-11-30
15	The Werewolf	1981-12-01	1982-02-22
16	Mona, Charity & Liz	1982-02-23	1982-05-16
17	Eric Kane the Conqueror	1982-05-17	1982-08-22
18	Kitty and Pop Huston	1982-08-23	1982-09-05
19	The Human Cobra & Mr. Hyde	unpublished	unpublished

== See also ==
- The Amazing Spider-Man (comic strip)
