= O. O. McIntyre =

American journalist (1884–1938)

- Portrait of McIntyre by Jim McDermott
- Born: February 18, 1884; Plattsburg, Missouri
- Died: February 14, 1938 (aged 53); Manhattan, New York City, New York
- Occupation: Newspaper columnist
- Spouse: Maybelle Hope Small (m. 1902)

Oscar Odd McIntyre (February 18, 1884 – February 14, 1938) was a New York newspaper columnist of the 1920s and 1930s. The Washington Post once described his column as "the letter from New York read by millions because it never lost the human, homefolk flavor of a letter from a friend." For a quarter of a century, his daily column, “New York Day by Day,” was published in more than 500 newspapers.

== Early career ==
Born in Plattsburg, Missouri, McIntyre began his newspaper career in 1902 on the Gallipolis Journal in Gallipolis, Ohio, where he married Maybelle Hope Small. He moved on to East Liverpool, Ohio, to become a feature writer on the East Liverpool Morning Tribune. After a period as managing editor of the Dayton Herald (Dayton, Ohio), McIntyre worked as assistant managing editor at the Cincinnati Post. He was 28 years old when he arrived in New York in 1912 as an associate editor at Hampton’s Magazine, which folded shortly after he took the job.

== Syndication ==
While freelancing and doing public relations work in 1912, he started writing a daily column about New York City life for "the home folks." He circulated these mimeographed columns through the mail, and the Bridgeport Post was the first newspaper to run the column at an annual fee of $8. With his wife handling his business affairs, he soon had syndication contracts with Scripps-Howard and McNaught. Within two years, 26 papers had signed on at an annual fee of $600. In New York, his column appeared in the Journal-American. Back in Gallipolis, the Gallipolis Tribune ran the column on its front page.

== New York Day by Day ==

His publicity work for the Hotel Majestic gave him free room and board, and syndication made him one of the highest-paid newspaper writers, with an income of more than $200,000 each year. He lived in style, and his many celebrity friends included Irvin S. Cobb, Gene Fowler, Major Bowes and top talents of Broadway. He was the publicist for Flo Ziegfeld and various comedians and actors.

His column required him to write approximately 800 words daily, or about 292,000 words a year. He usually worked right after breakfast, keeping the blinds closed and the lights on because he disliked sunlight, and by 5:30pm he had completed another installment. The column ran in 508 newspapers in every state, Mexico and Canada, for a combined circulation of 15,000,000. McIntyre received 3,000 letters a week from his readers. He also wrote a monthly essay for Cosmopolitan for over 15 years.

McIntyre turned down offers to become a radio personality because he thought it would lower the high standard he had for the writing in his column. However, the characters profiled in his columns gave Fred Allen the inspiration to create in 1942 the hugely popular "Allen's Alley" segment of his radio show.

== Small-town life ==
In 1929, McIntyre described his approach in the preface to Twenty-five Selected Stories, a collection of his articles from Cosmopolitan: "I write from a country town angle of a city's glamour, and the metropolis has never lost its thrill for me. Things the ordinary New Yorker accepts casually are my dish—the telescope man on the curb, the Bowery lodging houses and drifters... speakeasies...." He often wrote with affection about small-town life, as in "That Was Happy New Year" (1932):

Children scrubbed clean, fathers in frock coats and mothers in rustling silks moved from one home to another.

In the late afternoon, if the weather permitted, those who were not enjoying late afternoon naps would go to the public square to hear a band concert or perhaps an address by Colonel John L. Vance.

It was a gathering that would seem incongruous in this jazz age; Pappy Pitrat, the old French scholar, with his heavy cane and cape; Miss Eliza Sanns, a delicate bit of lavender and old lace; Colonel Creuzet with his snow white shock of hair; Mr. Hutchinson, the hardware merchant, who wore stiff white shirts on week-days; C. D. Kerr, the druggist, whom Editor Sibley called the best dressed man in town.

Most of these people today are “sleeping, sleeping on the hill.” It has been nearly twenty years now since I have seen Gallipolis. They tell me of a new high school building that occupies two blocks.

Back Street has been paved. A new bridge spans the Chicamaugua. The Park Central has a mosaic floor. There are concrete walks in the public square and Billy Schartz’s cigar store is now “The Smoke Shop.”

I want to go back again, but I hope there have not been too many changes. I like to think of the tolling evening church bells, the cows being driven home from pasture, the shrill whistle of the Hocking Valley train at six-fifteen as she rounded the curve at Fox’s dairy.

I hope the older men are still sitting out front on the big scales at Neal’s Mill at twilight and that the motor age has not forever stilled that doleful “ting-tang-ting-gg!” floating out from the anvils of the blacksmith shops.

I hope to go over at noon and join the little crowd that used to gather around the iron pump in the lower end of the public square. And I cherish a hope that the rusty old tin cup is there on the same brass chain.

I hope “Banty” Merriman still has a place for me to loaf in the back room of his jewelry store and that Harry Maddy will join me in one of our old walks up through Maple Shade past the fair grounds.

I want to keep always my memories of those dead and gone days when my world was young—when Karl Hall and I dug a cave under the river bank; when Alfie Resener and I smoked our first corn silk cigaret; when Harry Maxon and I set fire to McCormack’s haymow; when Ned Deletombe and I were taken to the Justice of Peace by Constable Jack Dufour for swimming naked in the creek.

== Books ==
After McIntyre traveled to London and Paris, he also wrote about those cities. His books include the 1935 bestseller The Big Town.

== Death ==
He died on Valentine's Day, February 14, 1938, of a heart attack at 2 A.M. at his apartment, 290 Park Avenue in Manhattan, New York City. He left an estate of $72,456 (approximately $1,657,000 today). He was buried in Gallipolis on a high bluff overlooking the Ohio River. where a marble bench bears the tribute "Beloved of a Nation." Maybelle Hope Small McIntyre, who lived to the age of 101, died in a nursing home in Point Pleasant, West Virginia on April 28, 1985.

== Legacy ==
After McIntyre's death, the newspaper column was continued by editor Charles Benedict Driscoll until 1951. When Driscoll's biography, The Life of O. O. McIntyre (Greystone Press, 1938), was published seven months after McIntyre's death, it made The New York Times bestseller list.

The O. O. McIntyre Park District in Gallipolis is named in his honor. A Gallia County film production about McIntyre was made in 1994 by Edna Pierce Whiteley. The O. O. McIntyre Story: Chronicle of a Journalist of Note is narrated by Whiteley with Earl Tope as the voice of McIntyre. The film is available as a 30-minute videocassette.

== Archives ==
The Gallia County Historical/Genealogical Society has more than a dozen three-inch binders on McIntyre.

== Fellowship ==
The annual O. O. McIntyre Postgraduate Writing Fellowship was established in 1986 by the Missouri School of Journalism to help aspiring writers further their careers.

== Bibliography ==
- White Light Nights. New York: Cosmopolitan Book Corporation, 1924.
- Twenty-five Selected Stories of O. O. McIntyre, introduction by Ray Long. Cosmopolitan magazine, 1929.
- Another Odd Book: Twenty-five Selected Stories of O. O. McIntyre, Second series. New York: Cosmopolitan magazine, 1932.
- Ed Wynn "Cosmopolitan Magazine March 1933
- The Big Town: New York Day by Day. New York: Dodd, Mead & Company, 1935.
- The More I Admire Dogs: True Tales about Man's Best Friend by Robert H. Davis, foreword by O. O. McIntyre. New York: Appleton-Century Company, 1936.
- The "Odd" Book: Selected short stories and columns of O. O. McIntyre. Jackson Publishing Company, 1989.
- Irvin S. Cobb: His Life and Letters by Fred G. Neuman, introduction by O. O. McIntyre. Kessinger Publishing, 2007. (Reprint of The Story of Irvin S. Cobb. Paducah, Kentucky: Young Printing, 1926.)

== See also ==
- Edgar Guest
- Franklyn MacCormack
- Franklin Pierce Adams
- Nick Kenny
