= Margaret Santry =

American journalist and radio host

Margaret Santry (July 9, 1904 - September 7, 1975) was an American journalist and radio host.

== Early years ==
The daughter of Swedish parents, Santry was born in Woodcliff, New Jersey, and majored in journalism at New York University.

== Career ==
As publicity director for a New York YWCA, soon after she graduated from college Santry promoted welfare workers' efforts on radio, becoming "one of the first to use radio to publicize a 'worthy cause.'" During one span, she set a record by interviewing 165 people in 165 days.

From 1925 to 1931, Santry worked for the Hearst newspaper chain. She wrote for the women's department of The Washington Post and was director of radio programs for the New York Evening Journal.

On radio, Santry specialized in three-minute interviews of celebrities and socially prominent people, with topics ranging from decorating bathrooms to international politics. A 1933 article in Radio Fan-Fare magazine reported that she had interviewed nearly 1,000 people. Through her interviews, she sought to dispel the Social Register mindset, shifting the concept of "society" from "a group of aloof and fabulous personalities" to people with "character, personality, and a desire to live more than to exist." Her program, Tea at the Ritz, broadcast from the Ritz-Carlton Hotel in New York City, debuted on December 2, 1935. Her broadcasts were heard on WABC in New York City and carried on CBS. She also broadcast on NBC.

At one point, Santry acted in summer stock theater in White Plains, New York, but she decided that her talents lay elsewhere. In the summer of 1935, she was in charge of promotion and publicity for the County Theatre.

== Personal life ==
Santry was the third wife of cartoonist and writer Joseph Patrick McEvoy. The two met when he was a guest on her radio program. After they married, they sometimes worked as a team covering news events. They remained married until his death in 1958.

== Papers ==
The Joseph Patrick McEvoy and Margaret Santry papers are housed at the University of Wyoming's American Heritage Center.
