= Dixie Dugan =

American comic strip

- Dixie Dugan as reprinted in Big Shot Comics #8 (December 1940).
- Author(s): J. P. McEvoy (1929–1955); Amram Scheinfield (ghost, early 1930s); Renny McEvoy (ghost mid-1930s – 1955, credited 1955–1966)
- Illustrator: John H. Striebel
- Current status/schedule: Concluded daily & Sunday strip
- Launch date: October 21, 1929
- End date: October 8, 1966
- Alternate name: Show Girl
- Syndicate(s): McNaught Syndicate
- Publisher: Columbia Comics
- Genre(s): romance, comedy, crime, suspense

Dixie Dugan is best known as a long-running syndicated newspaper comic strip published from October 21, 1929 to October 8, 1966. The title character was originally modeled after 1920s film actress Louise Brooks and early stories followed Dixie's exploits as a Hollywood showgirl.

== Novels ==
Dixie Dugan first appeared in slightly risqué novels written by J. P. McEvoy, serialized in 1928-29 in the pages of Liberty. McEvoy's novels were then published in book form by Simon & Schuster as Show Girl (1928) and Hollywood Girl (1929). In the first story, Dixie begins as a Broadway chorus girl, and in the second she moves to Hollywood. There is also a third Dixie Dugan novel, Society (1931) where Dixie mingles with high society.

The stories combine romance, glamour and a bit of scandal as Dixie pursues a career in show business. The novel's illustrations by John H. Striebel show a strong resemblance between Dixie Dugan and 1920s film actress Louise Brooks, complete with Brooks' then-fashionable "helmet" hairdo.

== Comic strip ==
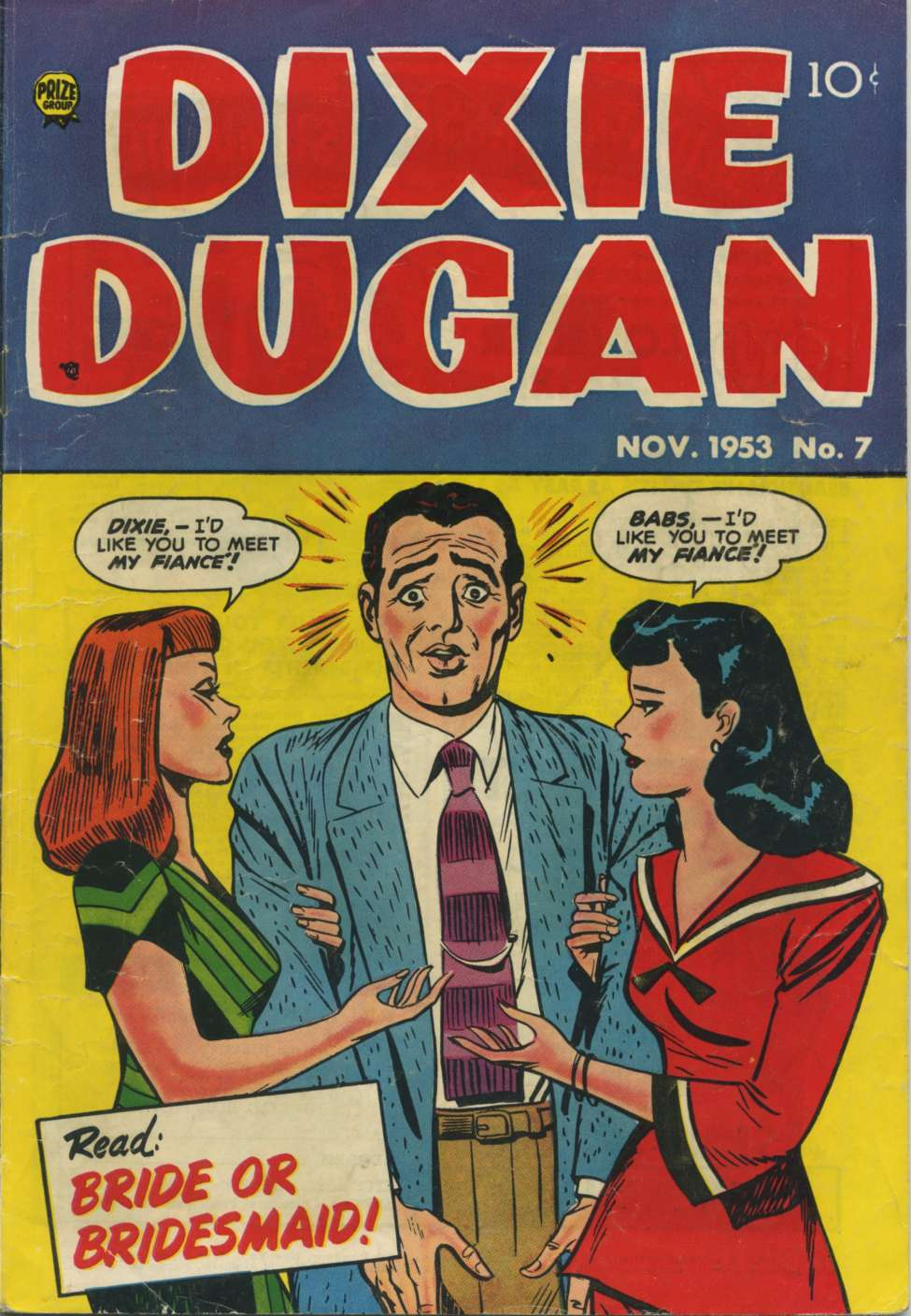

Beginning in October 1929, writer McEvoy and Striebel teamed to produce a daily newspaper comic strip, syndicated by the McNaught Syndicate. The name of the strip was originally Show Girl but changed to Dixie Dugan on December 23, 1929. As time went by, the strip dropped the show business aspect, and Dixie became a career girl pursuing a more wholesome variety of jobs. The stories varied from romance and comedy to crime and suspense.

Other characters featured in the strip included Dixie's elderly parents Ma and Pa Dugan, her niece Imogene and Dixie's best friend Mickie. The strip added a popular feature also used by Bill Woggon in his Katy Keene comic books: fashion designs for Dixie were submitted by fans and credited to them in the strip. In addition, when Dixie opened a small cafe, recipes were requested. When the action occurred on the town's streets, there was always in the background a bass player carrying his instrument on his back.

The Dixie Dugan Sunday page included a topper strip, Good Deed Dotty, which ran from February 5, 1933 to October 17, 1948.

Striebel continued to work on the strip until the early 1960s, when he became ill. Streibel's assistants were Al Bare, Dave Huffine and Frank McNitt, the son of McNaught Syndicate co-founder Virgil McNitt. Striebel's daughter, Margery Ann Huffine, did the strip's lettering from the age of 14 and Ed Mann did the artwork.

Like many other popular newspaper comic strips, the daily strips were collected and reprinted in various early comic books beginning in the 1930s.

Dixie Dugan (September 8, 1946)

== Films ==
Both novels were quickly adapted to movies, both starring Alice White as Dixie Dugan and both produced by Warner Bros.: Show Girl (1928) and Showgirl in Hollywood (1930). The first film featured music and sound effects using the Vitaphone sound-on-disc system, while the second film was a talkie using the early Western Electric sound-on-film system. In 1943, Twentieth Century Fox produced another film titled Dixie Dugan featuring Lois Andrews as the title character. By this time, Dixie had long since left behind her origins as a show girl. In this wartime movie, Dixie gets a job working as a secretary in a government office. Her new boss has a romantic interest in Dixie, but she remains faithful to her fiancé, a defense plant worker.
