= John H. Striebel =

American cartoonist

- Born: September 14, 1891 Bertrand, Michigan, U.S.
- Died: May 22, 1962 (aged 70) U.S.
- Areas: Writer, Artist
- Notable works: Dixie Dugan

Dixie Dugan as reprinted in Big Shot Comics #8 (December 1940).

John H. Striebel (September 14, 1891 - May 22, 1962) was an American illustrator and comic strip artist who was best known for the newspaper strip Dixie Dugan, which was scripted by J. P. McEvoy. The two met when they were college freshmen at the University of Notre Dame.

== Biography ==
Born in Bertrand, Michigan, Striebel began working at the age of 14 as a political cartoonist for the South Bend Daily News, receiving recognition as the youngest front-page cartoonist in the country. After graduating from Notre Dame, he moved to Chicago where he became an advertising and fashion illustrator for the Chicago Tribune. In addition to magazine covers, he also illustrated Robert Quillen's syndicated feature, Aunt Het.

He illustrated for magazines, including Liberty, and a comic strip, Pantomime, which ran for eight years. While doing Pantomime he also illustrated McEvoy's magazine serial, Show Girl.

After work on The Potters, a feature by McEvoy, he moved to Woodstock, New York, in 1923 to study painting with Henry Lee McFee and Andrew Dasburg. He sometimes drew Woodstock into his strips as a town named Stoodwock.

In October 1929, he began illustrating Dixie Dugan, created and written by McEvoy. It was distributed by the McNaught Syndicate from 1929 to 1966. Striebel continued to work on the strip until the early 1960s, when he became ill. Streibel's assistants were Al Bare, Dave Huffine and Frank McNitt, the son of McNaught Syndicate co-founder Virgil McNitt. Striebel's daughter, Margery Ann Huffine, did the strip's lettering from the age of 14.

Striebel died on May 22, 1962.
