= Skyman (Columbia Comics) =

Comic book superhero

The Skyman
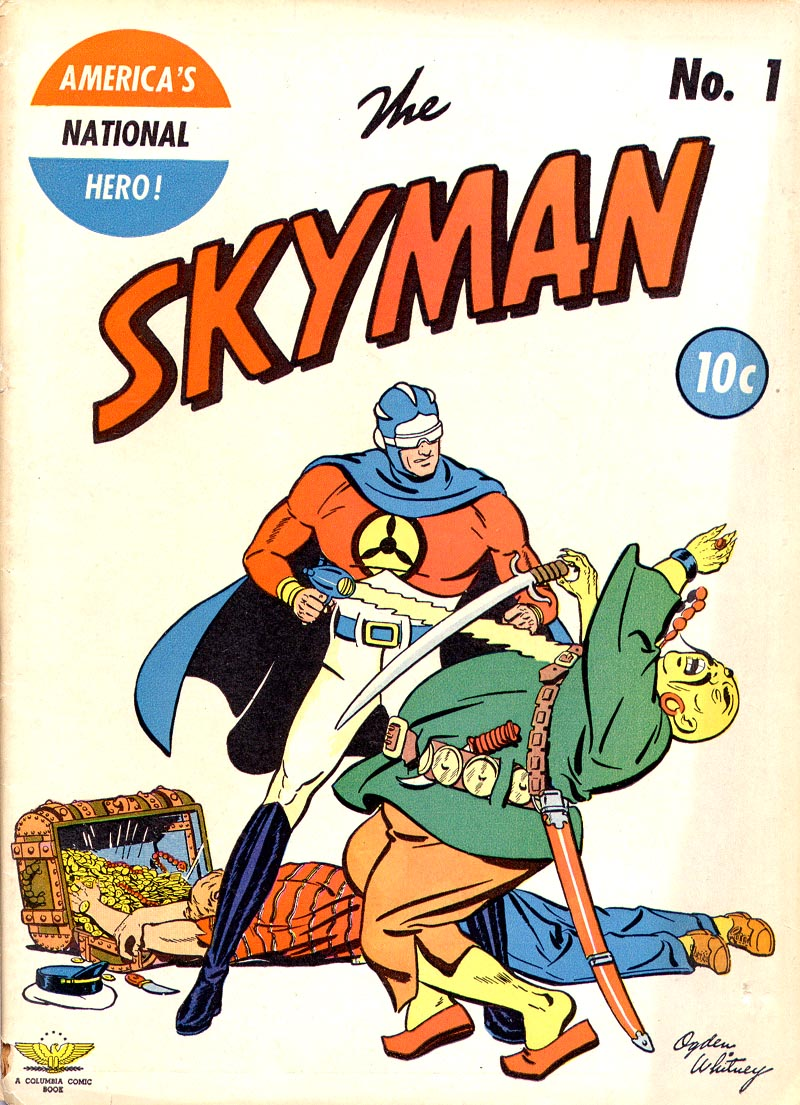
- The Skyman #1 (1941, no month listed), art by Ogden Whitney.

Publication information
- Publisher: Columbia Comics
- First appearance: Big Shot Comics #1 (May 1940)
- Created by: Gardner Fox; Ogden Whitney

In-story information
- Alter ego: Allan Turner

The Skyman is a comic book superhero that appeared stories during the Golden Age of Comic Books. Created by writer Gardner Fox and artist Ogden Whitney, the character first appeared in the Columbia Comics omnibus title Big Shot Comics #1 (May 1940). He is unrelated to the DC Comics character.

The Skyman was Allan Turner, who was raised by his uncle to become "outstanding in mind and body". A brilliant scientist, he had no superpowers but did have a flying wing-shaped airplane, dubbed the Wing, that flew by the power of Earth's magnetic poles. With this and money inherited from his late uncle's will, he fought crime. In 1944, he acquired an "Icarus-Cape", a huge pair of wings which allowed him to fly without an airplane. His love interest was detective Fawn Carroll.

According to Jess Nevins' Encyclopedia of Golden Age Superheroes, "Skyman fights ordinary criminals, saboteurs, mad scientists, cursed idols, Soviet scientists, Emma the Spy Queen, the Gremlin, and Nazis on the moon".

== Publication history ==
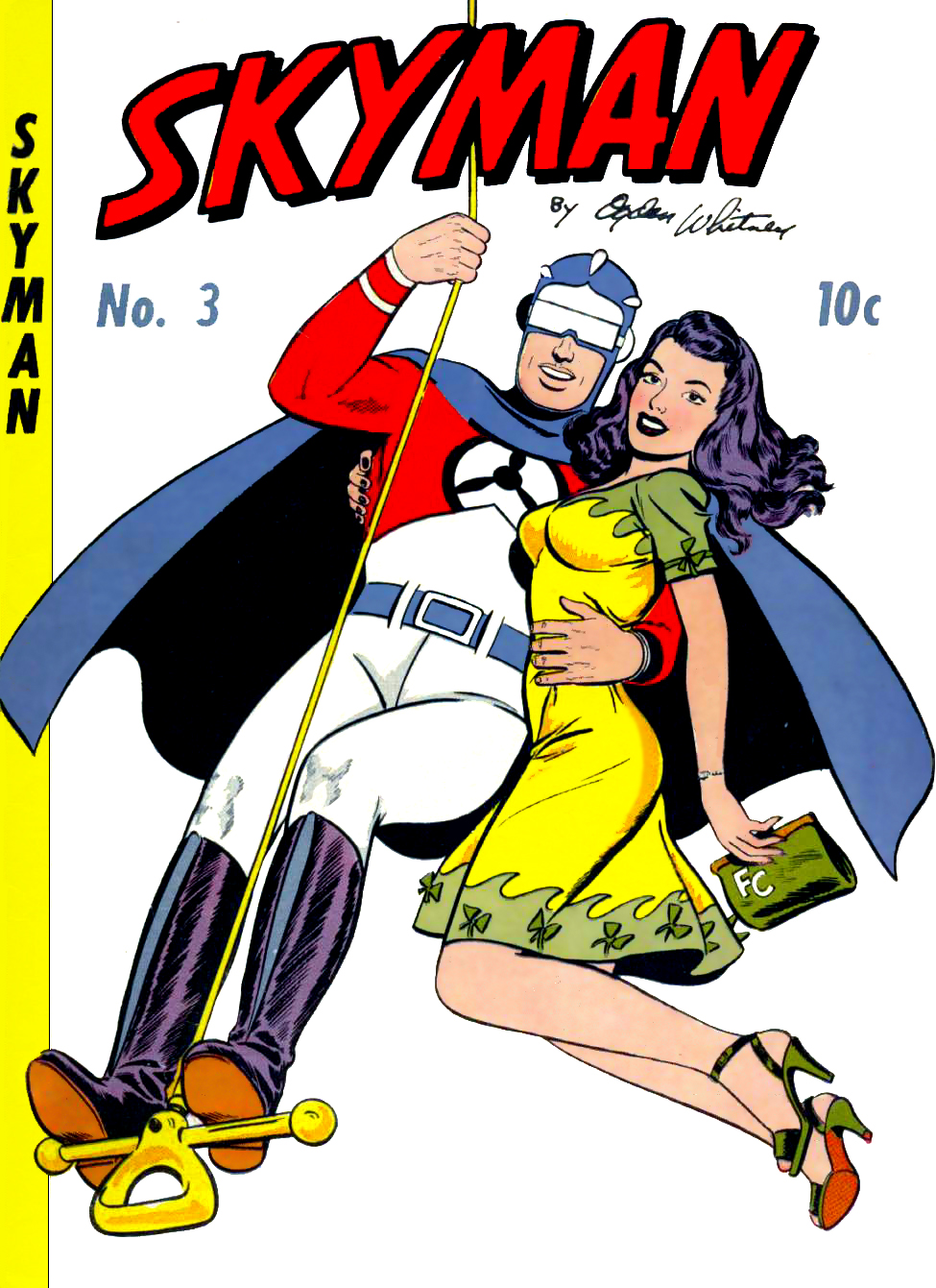
Cover of Skyman #3 (Columbia Comics, 1947), artwork by Ogden Whitney.

The Skyman was created by writer Gardner Fox and artist Ogden Whitney in the Columbia Comics omnibus title Big Shot Comics #1 (May 1940). After appearing in the first eight issues of Big Shot, the character was spun off into his own series, in which one issue each appeared in 1941, 1942, 1947, and 1948. The Skyman went on to appear in virtually every issue of Big Shot through issue #101 (May 1949). That comic itself lasted only three more issues. The Skyman additionally appeared in a story in Sparky Watts #1 (1942).

New Media Publishing reprinted a Skyman story in the unnumbered one-shot Golden Age of Comics Special (Summer 1982). A.C.E. Comics' Return of the Skyman #1 (Sept. 1987) reprinted his origin from The Skyman #1 (1941) and published a new story written by Mort Todd with art by Spider-Man co-creator Steve Ditko. Original artist Ogden Whitney penciled and inked a new cover based on his cover for The Skyman #1 from 1941. AC Comics ran reprints in Golden-Age Men of Mystery #7 and 23 (May 1998 and 2000), Golden-Age Treasury #2 (2003), and Men of Mystery Comics #66 (July 2007). He was among the large ensemble of public domain characters appearing in Dynamite Entertainment's Project Superpowers #0 and #3 (Jan. and May 2008), and Project Superpowers: Chapter Two #2, 5–6, with featured status in Project Superpowers: Chapter Two: Prelude and issues #7 and 10 (cumulatively Oct. 2008 – June 2010). Skyman was scheduled to appear in the Bounty Hunter series from Capture Comics.

Dark Horse Comics released the Sky-Man One-Shot in November 2014, featuring their own version of the character: Sergeant Eric Reid.
