= Associated Newspapers (U.S.) =

Associated Newspapers, Inc.
- Industry: Print syndication
- Founded: 1912; 114 years ago
- Founder: Henry Herbert McClure
- Defunct: c. 1966; 60 years ago
- Fate: absorbed into Bell Syndicate, became part of the Bell-McClure Syndicate
- Headquarters: 247 West 43rd Street, New York City, U.S.
- Area served: United States
- Products: Comic strips, newspaper columns, editorial cartoons
- Owner: The New York Globe, Chicago Daily News, The Boston Globe, Philadelphia Bulletin (1912–1930); Bell Syndicate (1930–c. 1966)

Associated Newspapers, Inc. was a print syndication service of columns and comic strips that was in operation from 1912 to c. 1966. The syndicate was originally a cooperative of four newspapers: The New York Globe, the Chicago Daily News, The Boston Globe, and the Philadelphia Bulletin. Associated Newspapers was led by Henry Herbert McClure (1874-1938), a cousin of S. S. McClure, founder of the McClure Syndicate, the first American newspaper syndicate. In 1930, Associated Newspapers was acquired by and became a subsidiary of the Bell Syndicate. The syndicate's most successful, long-running strip was Gladys Parker's Mopsy.

== History ==
H. H. McCure joined the staff of the McClure Syndicate in 1899, bringing the writing of Willa Cather to the McClure Syndicate. Eventually becoming managing editor, he left in 1906 when the writing staff of McClure's Magazine defected over disputes with S. S. McClure and formed The American Magazine. That same year, he founded his own syndication service, H. H. McClure and Co.. In 1912, he resigned his interest in H. H. McClure and Co. and joined the newly formed Associated Newspapers Syndicate.

Associated Newspapers jumped into the comic strip syndication business immediately; strips the company distributed beginning in the period 1912–1913 included William James Sinnott's Dickey Dippy's Diary, Leo O'Mealia's strips Wedlocked and Little Pal, and the syndicate's most notable strip, Arthur R. "Pop" Momand's Keeping Up with the Joneses.

Columns syndicated by Associated Newspapers included the columns of New York Globe publisher Jason Rogers, H. H. McClure, J. G. Lloyd, and the Rev. Dr. Frank Crane.

From 1924 to c. 1926 the syndicate distributed a semi-weekly series of "human interest" cartoons by a rotating cast of artists, including C. D. Batchelor, Sid Greene, Frank Moser, Robert Ripley, and John Terry. Associated Newspapers syndicated Ripley's Believe It or Not! panel from 1924 to 1929, when he was lured away by King Features Syndicate.

The Great Depression brought hard times to Associated Newspapers (among many others). In 1930, Associated Newspapers was acquired by John Neville Wheeler's Bell Syndicate to become part of the Bell-McClure Syndicate, although it continued to syndicate material under the Associated Newspapers name.

In 1933, just as the concept of "comic books" was getting off the ground, Eastern Color Printing published Funnies on Parade, which reprinted in color several comic strips licensed from the Ledger Syndicate, the McNaught Syndicate, the Bell Syndicate, and Associated Newspapers' Keeping Up with the Joneses and Holly of Hollywood, both by Arthur R. "Pop" Momand. Eastern Color neither sold this periodical nor made it available on newsstands, but rather sent it out free as a promotional item to consumers who mailed in coupons clipped from Procter & Gamble soap and toiletries products. The company printed 10,000 copies, and it was a great success. Eventually, Gaines and Eastern Color collaborated in 1934 to publish the ongoing title Famous Funnies, which ran for 218 issues using a mixture of newspaper strip reprints and some original material, and is considered the first true American comic book.

The Associated Newspapers division continued to syndicate material, the last major comic strip being Gladys Parker's Mopsy (1939–1965), which appeared in 300 newspapers by the end of the 1940s.

== Associated Newspapers strips and panels ==
- Dickey Dippy's Diary by William James Sinnott (1910–1927)
- Holly of Hollywood by Arthur R. "Pop" Momand (c. 1933–c. 1938)
- Keen Teens by Stookie Allen (1950s)
- Keeping Up with the Joneses by Pop Momand (March 31, 1913–April 16, 1938)
- Little Pal by Leo O'Mealia (1913–1928)
- Miss Cairo Jones by Jerry Albert & Bob Oksner (1945–1947)
- Mopsy by Gladys Parker (1939–1965)
- Reg'lar Fellers by Gene Byrnes (1942–1949) — came over from King Features Syndicate
- Ripley's Believe It or Not! by Robert Ripley (1924–1929)
- Wedlocked by Leo O'Mealia (1912–1929)
