= Associated Newspapers (disambiguation) =

Associated Newspapers Ltd was a British company, now DMG Media.

Similarly named companies include:

- Associated Newspapers Ltd (Australia), founded in Sydney 1929
- Associated Newspapers (U.S.), syndication service, founded 1912
- Associated Newspapers of Ceylon Limited
- The Associated Journals Limited, an Indian newspaper publisher
