= E. C. Stoner =

African-American comic and commercial artist (1897–1969)

E.C. Stoner
- A photo of Stoner from his time as a spokesperson for Gordon's Gin
- Born: Elmer Cecil Stoner; October 20, 1897; Wilkes-Barre, Pennsylvania
- Died: December 16, 1969 (aged 72); New York, New York
- Education: Pennsylvania Academy of Fine Arts
- Awards: Artist Laureate of Pennsylvania; Outstanding Son of Pennsylvania (1950); Prix de Rome; From Pennsylvania Academy of Fine Arts; Packard Prize; Cresson Traveling Scholarship

The first commercial version of Mr. Peanut created by E. C. Stoner from the competition entry of 14-year-old Antonio Gentile in 1916.

Elmer Cecil Stoner (October 20, 1897 – December 16, 1969) was an American comics artist and commercial illustrator. Stoner was one of the first African-American comic book artists, and is believed to have created the iconic Mr. Peanut mascot. He produced pencil art for the first issue of Detective Comics, published by National Comics Publications (the company that later became DC Comics), and worked for a variety of other golden age companies such as Timely Comics, Street & Smith, EC Comics, Fawcett Comics, and Dell Comics. Near the end of his life, Stoner was also a spokesman for Gordon's Gin.

== Early life ==
Stoner was born on October 20, 1897, in Wilkes-Barre, Pennsylvania, to Mary Alice and George W. Stoner. His mother was a pianist, and his father a church sexton at the local St. Stephen's Episcopal Church. Stoner was the eldest of the family's three children, though there were two that had died earlier. Stoner left school at 11, as was the custom in coal towns like Wilkes-Barre, but instead went to work at a Woolworth's as a stocker at the behest of founder Fred Morgan Kirby, who attended the church where Stoner's father worked. While working at Woolworth's, Stoner began to learn sign-painting, lettering, and advertising, and soon began to work as a freelance artist in the Wilkes-Barre area.

== Creation of Mr. Peanut, first marriage, move to Harlem ==
The Planters company sponsored a contest in 1916 to create a mascot, which 14-year old Antonio Gentile won. According to the company website, the drawing was "enhanced" by a "professional illustrator," who added the top hat, monocle, and cane. While Planters never revealed the identity of the artist who made a new version of Gentile's design. Stoner's widow Henriette noted the creation of Mr. Peanut as one of Stoner's accomplishments when submitting a questionnaire for Who's Who of American Comic Books.

Stoner registered in 1918 for the draft, but was not called to service due to being in school. Stoner attended the Pennsylvania Academy of the Fine Arts, supposedly also sponsored by Kirby. While at the school, he earned a number of awards, including the school's Packard Prize (awarded for best sketches of animals at the Philadelphia Zoo), a Cresson Traveling Scholarship, and a Prix de Rome.

Stoner married his first wife Vivienne in 1922 and moved to Harlem, where his work was featured in a "Negro artist" exhibition at the Harlem branch of the New York Public Library. According to the head librarian, his work was "splendidly planned and executed." The couple later moved to Greenwich Village so that Vivienne could open a gift shop, and they became "part of a tight-knit circle of African-Americans. . .and hobnobbed with the intellectual elite of the community."

Stoner and Vivienne divorced sometime before 1927.

== Magazine and comic book work ==
Stoner's first major illustrative work, a children's book named Mic Mac on the Track, debuted in 1930. During this time, Stoner worked at Tower Magazines, a women-and-children-oriented series of magazines that was distributed at Woolworth's stores. This company folded in 1935, leading Stoner to freelance and begin to transition into comic art. Stoner's first foray into comics was a story in Detective Comics #1, Speed Saunders and the River Patrol, introducing the character Cyril "Speed" Saunders. Sources disagree about whether Stoner wrote or drew the story, and comic historians Don Markstein and Kevin Burton Smith note that since Stoner's tenure on the character was so brief (he left after the first issue), that Gardner Fox had potentially created the character.

=== Shop work ===
After working on Detective Comics, Stoner moved between multiple comics "shops", or small workshops where artists would produce art and send it to a publisher. According to Ken Quattro, working in shops ''offered a secondary bonus for Stoner, as it provided a buffer between him and the publisher should they be reluctant to employ a black man," as Stoner was one of the first prominent black cartoonists, followed closely by Matt Baker and Alvin Hollingsworth. Between 1940 and 1944, Stoner worked for Timely Comics, where he inked some early Breeze Barton stories, at Fawcett Comics where he worked on Spy Smasher, and at Street & Smith where he worked on Ajax the Sun Man, a minor feature in Street and Smith's Doc Savage comic. At Dell, Stoner mainly worked as a cover artist, drawing covers for anthology titles Popular and The Funnies, the latter of which prominently featured the character Phantasmo, Dell's first original superhero feature, in his "clean-lined, if awkward style." However, he also pencilled some stories in Dell Comics's War Heroes and War Comics series. Stoner was also briefly employed by Parents Magazine, working on their long-running educational True Comics series from 1941 to 1942.

Stoner also worked on the relaunched Blue Beetle title for Fox Comics near the end of World War II, providing either cover or interior work for issues #31 to #45. One of his various other projects was as an artist for The Challenger, a publication from Protestant Digest and their interfaith committee that served to counteract fascist and antisemitic propaganda.

He also created the three-issue comics series Blackstone, Master Magician in 1946 for Vital Publications, which was later revived for a single issue by EC Comics (1947) followed by three issues at Timely Comics (1948). Despite its short run, the EC revival was adapted into a radio drama series, Blackstone, the Magic Detective, which ran from 1948 to 1950. After the conclusion of the comic series, Stoner illustrated at least one souvenir program for Harry Blackstone Sr., the namesake of the series.

After the war, Stoner briefly worked on another Vital comic title, and left comics between 1951 and 1952 due to a judge refusing his request to have another Vital comic series he drew, Rick Kane, Space Marshal, stopped from publication. Stoner maintained that Vital continuing to produce the title amounted to a violation of his contract. His last known work was an educational comic titled Deadline: The Story Behind The Headline.

In his history of the American anti-comics movement, The Ten-Cent Plague, writer David Hajdu included Stoner on a list of comics creators who never worked in comics again after the virulent criticism of comics in the early-to-mid 1950s.

== Personal life and death ==
Outside of comics, Stoner was an "accomplished pianist" and patron of the arts, and also owned the apartment building in which he lived, at 228 W. 13th Street. According to an article in the Daily Worker, Stoner spent time entertaining United Service Organizations (USO) personnel and providing them with drawing lessons, in addition to "occasionally [giving] art lectures as a means of improving Negro-white relations." In the late 1960s, Stoner was one of several prominent African-Americans featured in a series of ads for Gordon's Gin.

Stoner died on December 16, 1969, and had a private funeral.

== Style and reception ==
As a classically-trained illustrator who transitioned into comic art in the middle of his life, Stoner's comic art was sometimes criticized for not matching up with other artists of the time, as relayed by Ken Quattro: "...Stoner’s work was not in the league of Eisner or Kirby or Fine. He was, after all, a middle-aged fine artist, who had only worked in advertising and magazine illustration, trying to make the jarring transition to comic books. The techniques and requirements of sequential storytelling were new to him and it was apparent."

Ron Goulart criticised Stoner's work in his Great History of Comic Books, "Stoner's drawing is the visual equivalent of fingernails scraped across a slate, and whenever he had a chance to botch the perspective, the composition, or even the inking, he did so with brio."

== Works ==
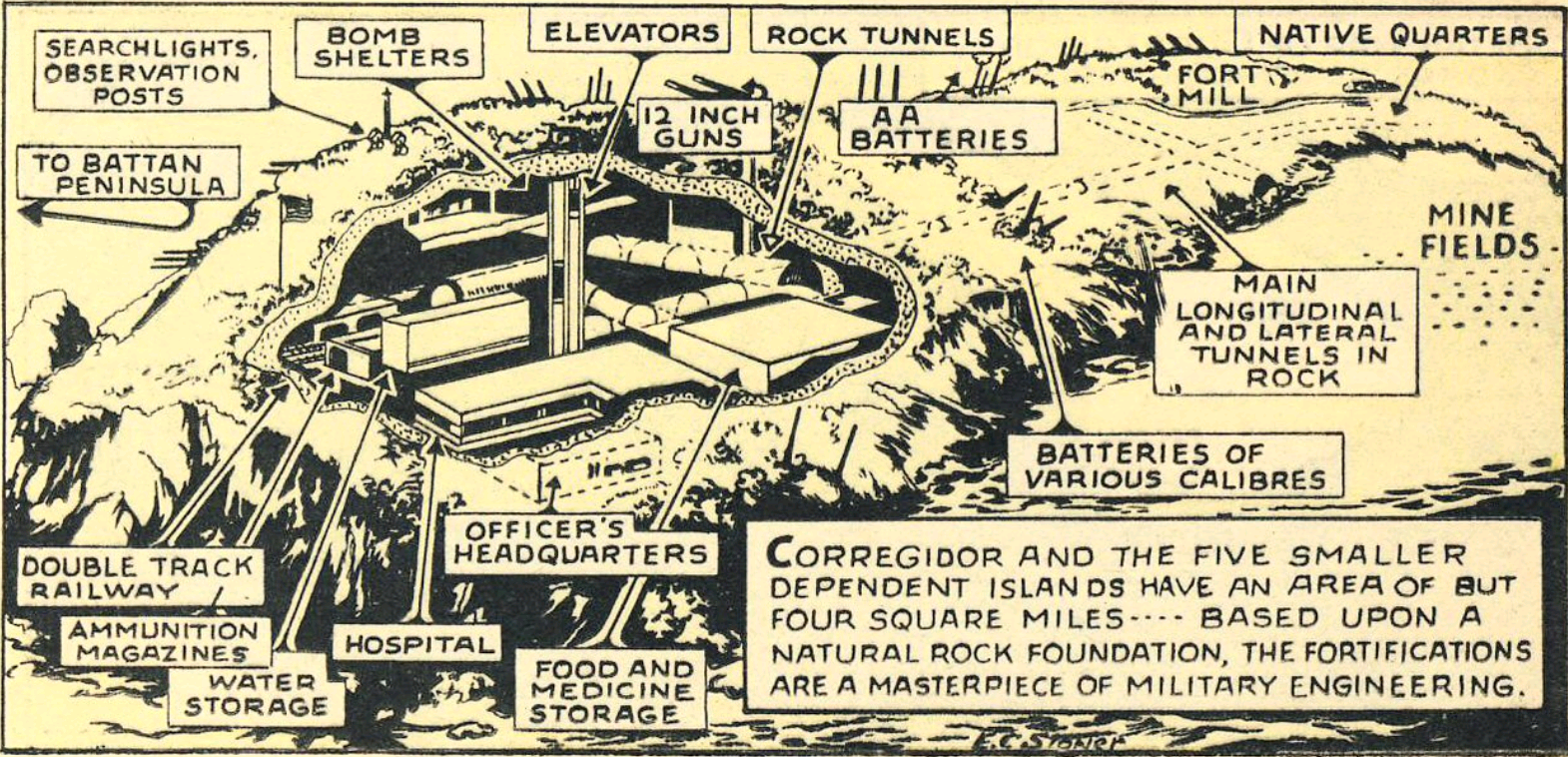
A page bearing Stoner's signature from the December 1942 issue of Dell's War Comics

List of comics drawn by Stoner
Company	Title	Tenure	Ref
Syndicated	Rick Kane, Space Marshall	1951	
National Comics Publications	Speed Saunders (in Detective Comics)	1937	
Dell Comics	Popular Comics	1940–1943	
Dell Comics	Martan the Marvel Man	1939–1941	
Dell Comics	Phantasmo (in The Funnies and Large Feature Comic)	1940–1942	
Dell Comics	War Comics/War Stories	1942–1944	
Dell Comics	War Heroes	1942–1944	
EC Comics	Blackstone	1947	
Fox Comics	Blue Beetle	1943–1945	
Fox Comics	Bouncer	1943–1945	
Fox Comics	Green Mask	1944–1946	
Interfaith Publications	The Challenger	1945	
Timely Comics	Breeze Barton (in Daring Mystery Comics)	1940	
Timely Comics	Flexo (in Mystic Comics)	1940	
Street & Smith	Ajax the Sun Man (in Doc Savage)	1941	
Street & Smith	Blackstone Master Magician Comics (Vital Publications)	1946	
Street & Smith	Iron Munro in (Shadow Comics)	1940–1941	
