= Annibelle =

American comic strip

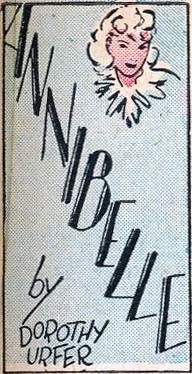
- Author(s): Dorothy Urfer; Virginia Krausmann
- Launch date: December 29, 1929
- End date: October 15, 1939
- Syndicate(s): Newspaper Enterprise Association, Inc.
- Genre: Humor

Annibelle was a comic strip created in 1929 by Dorothy Urfer. It was first published as a single panel cartoon on December 29, 1929, on the women's page of Newspaper Enterprise Association, Inc.'s Everyweek section. The humorous strip revolves around Annibelle's social life. In 1935, Annibelle began being printed in color. Virginia Krausmann took over the strip in March 1936. Annibelle comics were reprinted in The Funnies. Annibelle last ran on October 15, 1939.

== Gallery ==
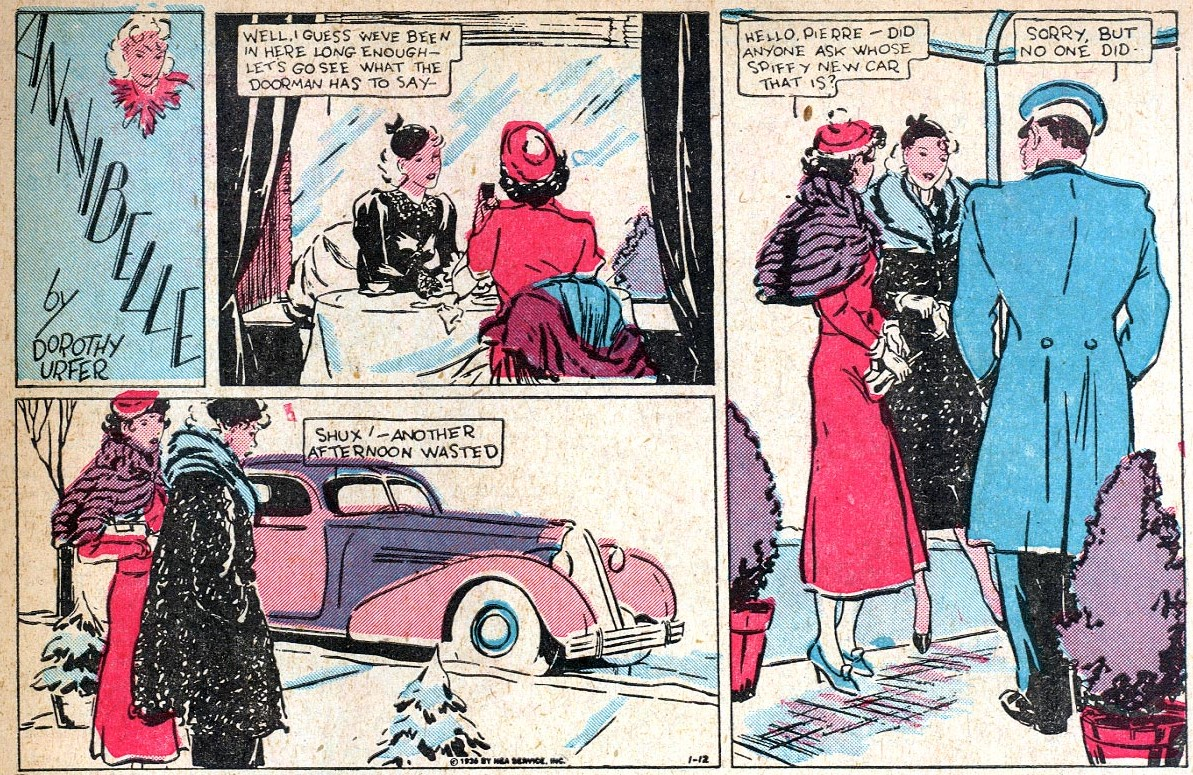
The Funnies, No. 2 (1936)

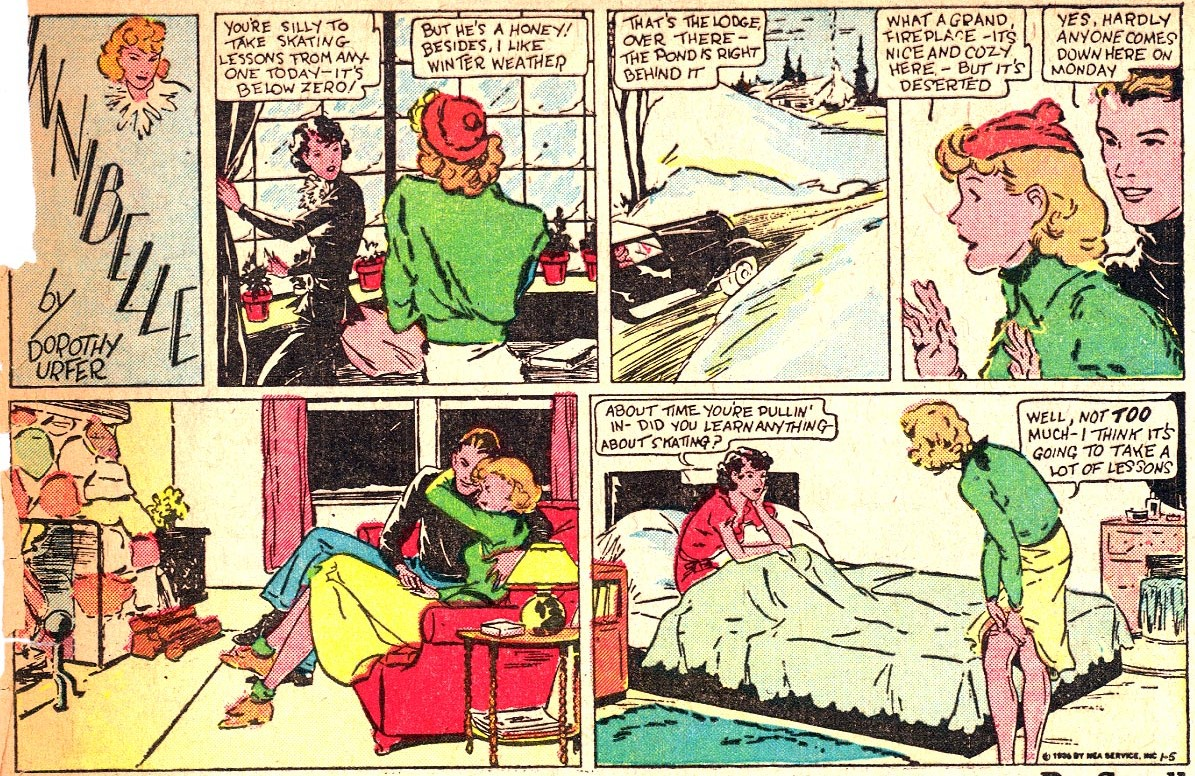
The Funnies, No. 2 (1936)

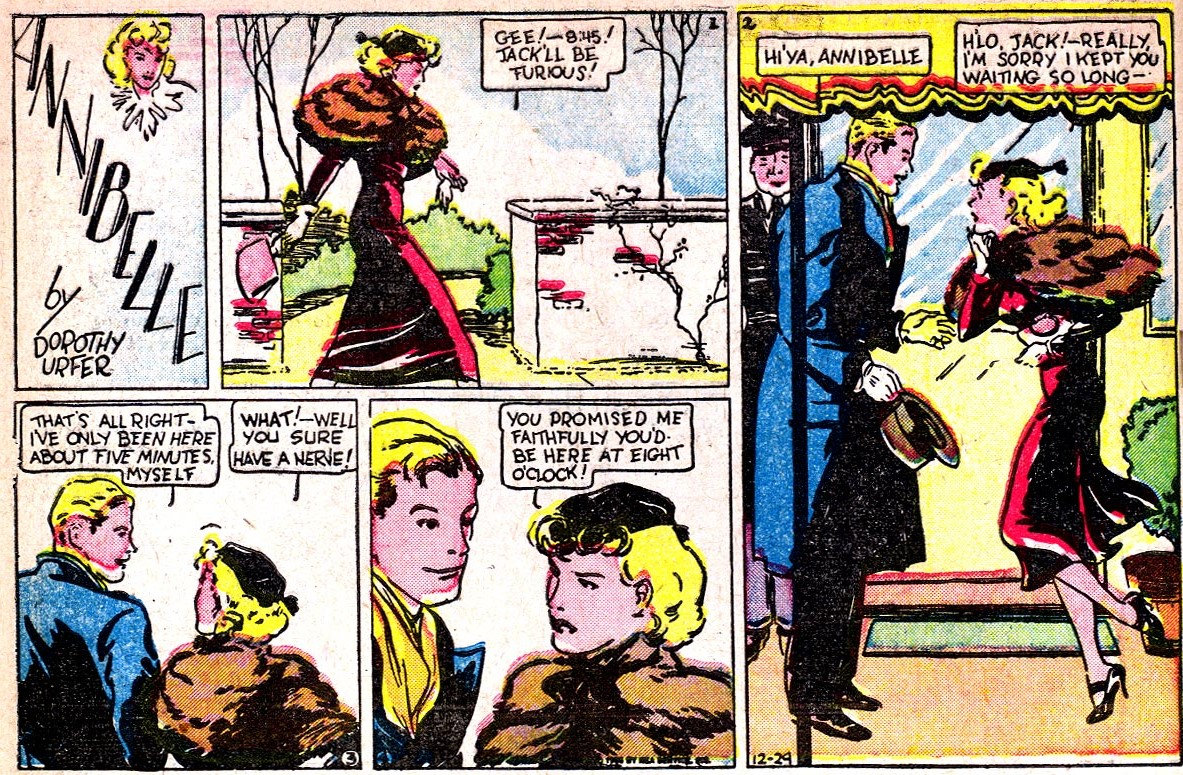
The Funnies, No. 5 (1937)

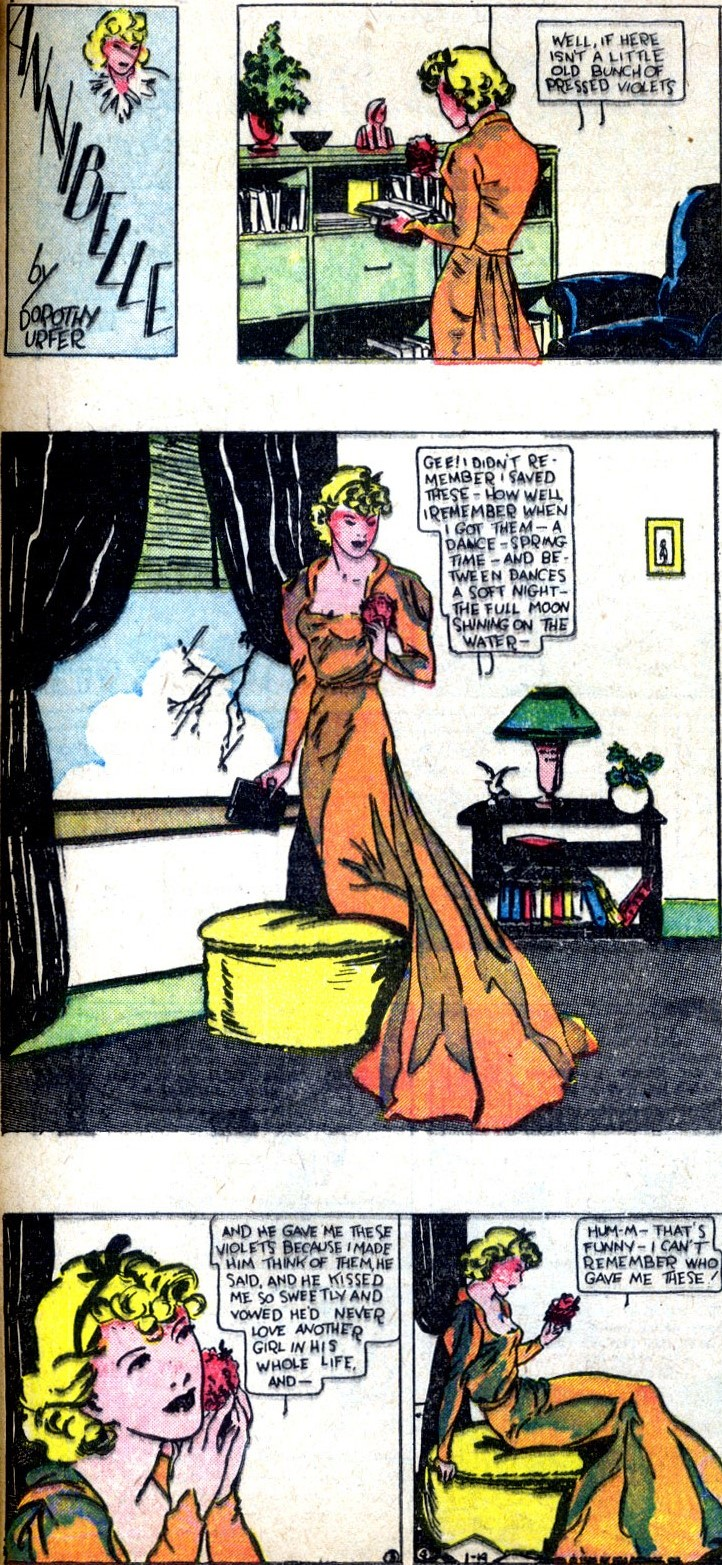
The Funnies, No. 5 (1937)

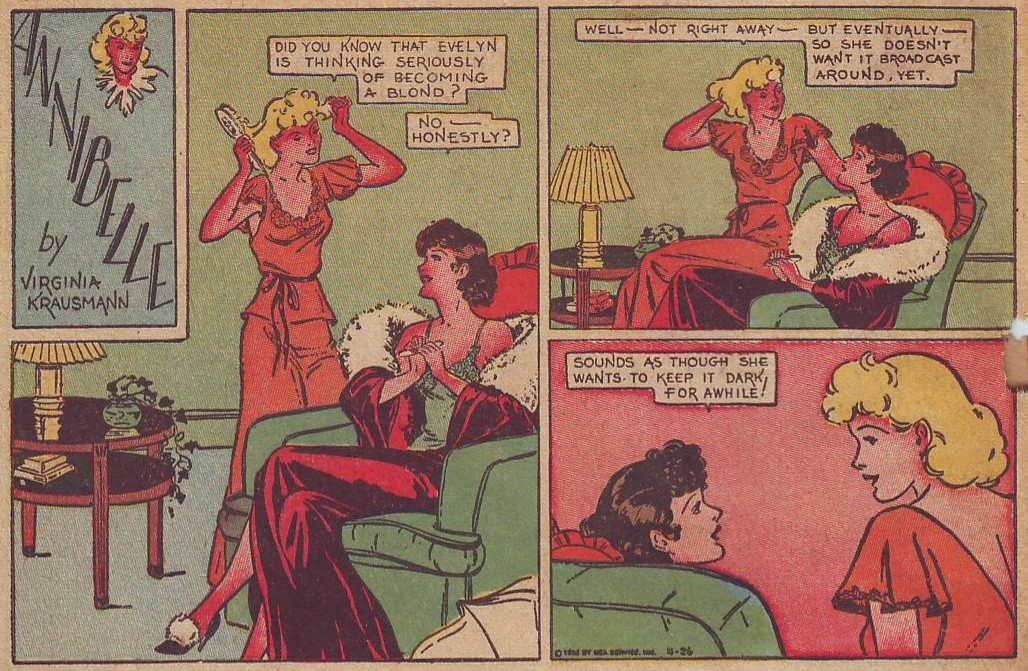
The Funnies, No. 8 (1937)

== See also ==
- Mopsy, a similar comic strip created by Gladys Parker
