= Mopsy =

American comic strip by Gladys Parker

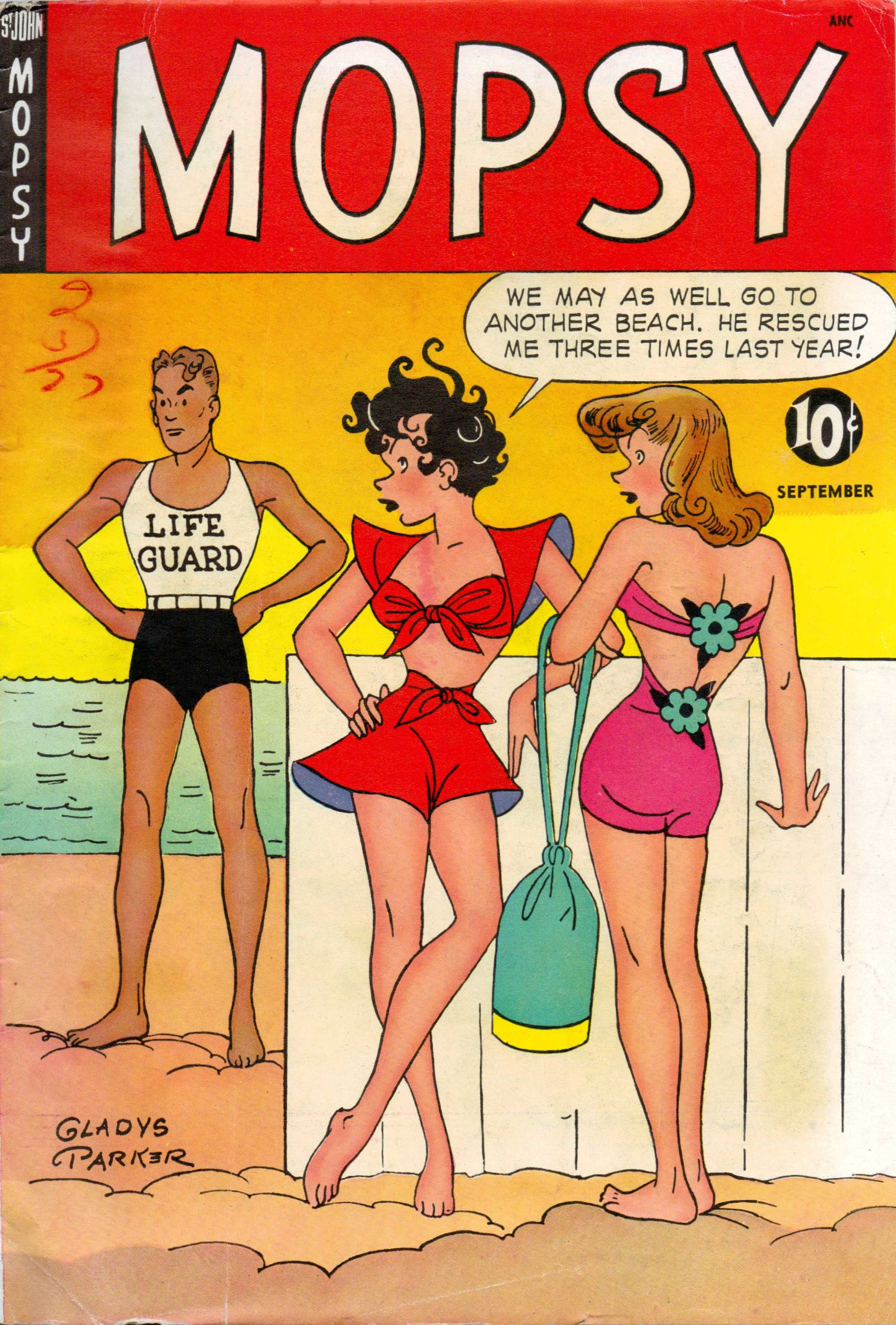
- Cover of Mopsy #12 (September 1950)
- Author: Gladys Parker
- Launch date: 1937
- End date: August 13, 1966
- Syndicate(s): Associated Newspapers
- Publisher(s): St. John Publications; Charlton Comics; Berkley Books
- Genre: Humor

Mopsy was a comic strip created in 1937 by Gladys Parker, who was one of the few female cartoonists of the era. The strip had a long run over three decades. Parker modeled the character of Mopsy after herself. In 1946, she recalled, "I got the idea for Mopsy when the cartoonist Rube Goldberg said my hair looked like a mop. That was several years ago, and she has been my main interest ever since." The strip ended on August 13, 1966.

== Characters and story ==
Mopsy is an independent and witty, if ditzy, woman. She enjoys activities such as golf, fishing, and painting. Parker was a fashion illustrator and designer, and Mopsy always sported a stylish look. With the Sunday strip, added in 1945, Parker was able to expand her fashion concepts into a sidebar series of paper dolls, titled "Mopsy Modes." "Mopsy Modes" did not always feature Mopsy herself; sometimes the doll was blonde or red-haired, and rarely, a young girl or a man.

During World War II, Mopsy held such wartime jobs as a nurse and a munitions-plant worker, and the feature grew in popularity. After World War II ended, Mopsy was fired from her defense job in 1947 and went back to civilian life. By the end of the 1940s, Mopsy was being published in 300 newspapers.

The strip has no continuity, and the only steady character is Mopsy. It has been drawn in single- and multi-paneled formats.

== Comic books ==
In 1947, Mopsy began being published in St. John Publications' Pageant of Comics #1. The following year, St. John gave her a title of her own, and Mopsy ran for 19 issues (February 1948 to September 1953). Parker created original content for these comic books, including original stories and full-page paper dolls. Mopsy was successful, becoming one of St. John's longer-lasting titles. Mopsy was sometimes used as a back-up page in St. John's romance comics.

== Reprints ==
Charlton Comics reprinted many Mopsy comic books in the publication TV Teens during the 1950s. Berkley Books published a Mopsy paperback collection in 1955.

== Gallery ==
=== TV Teens ===
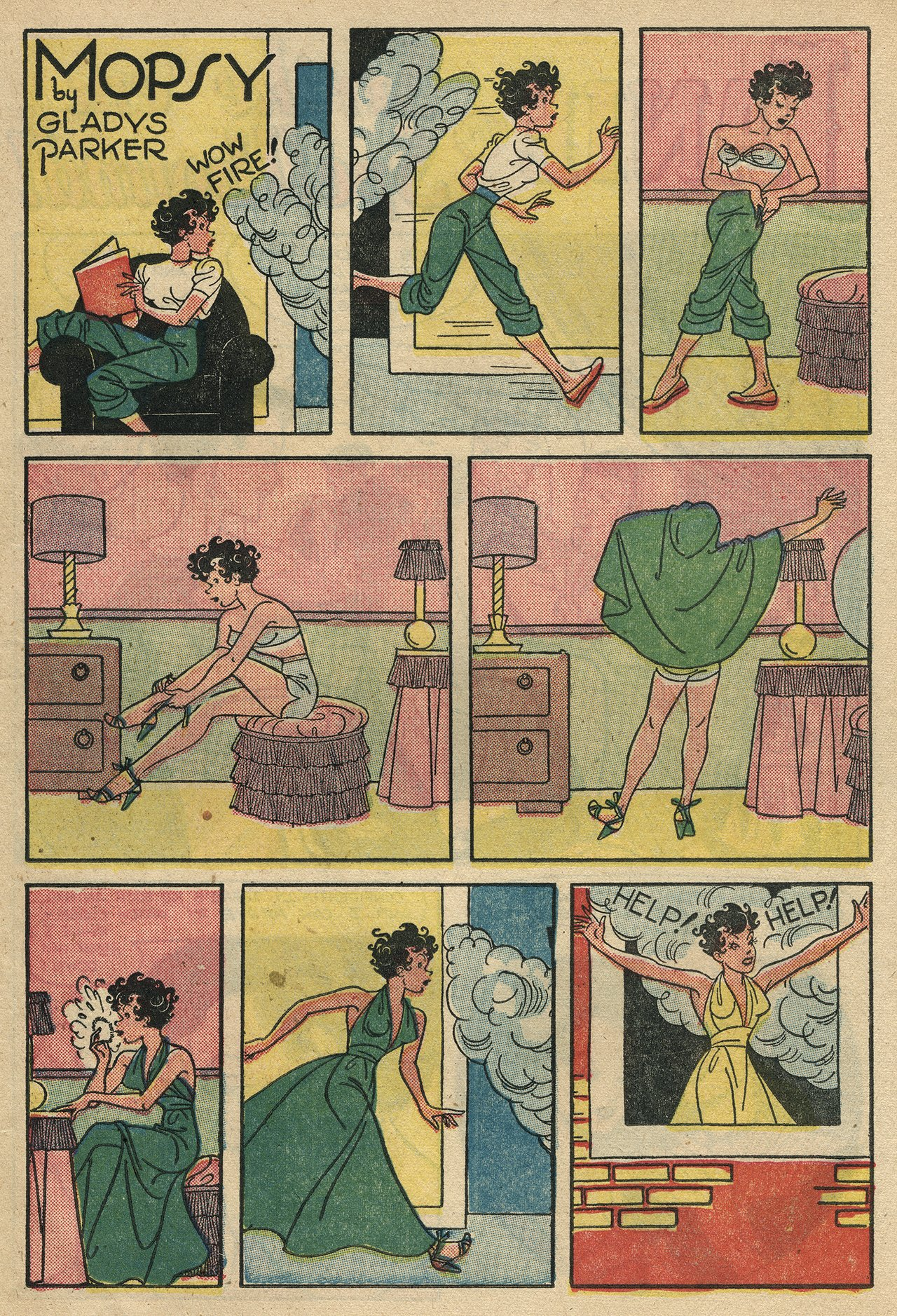
TV Teens, Vol. 2, No. 7 (1955)

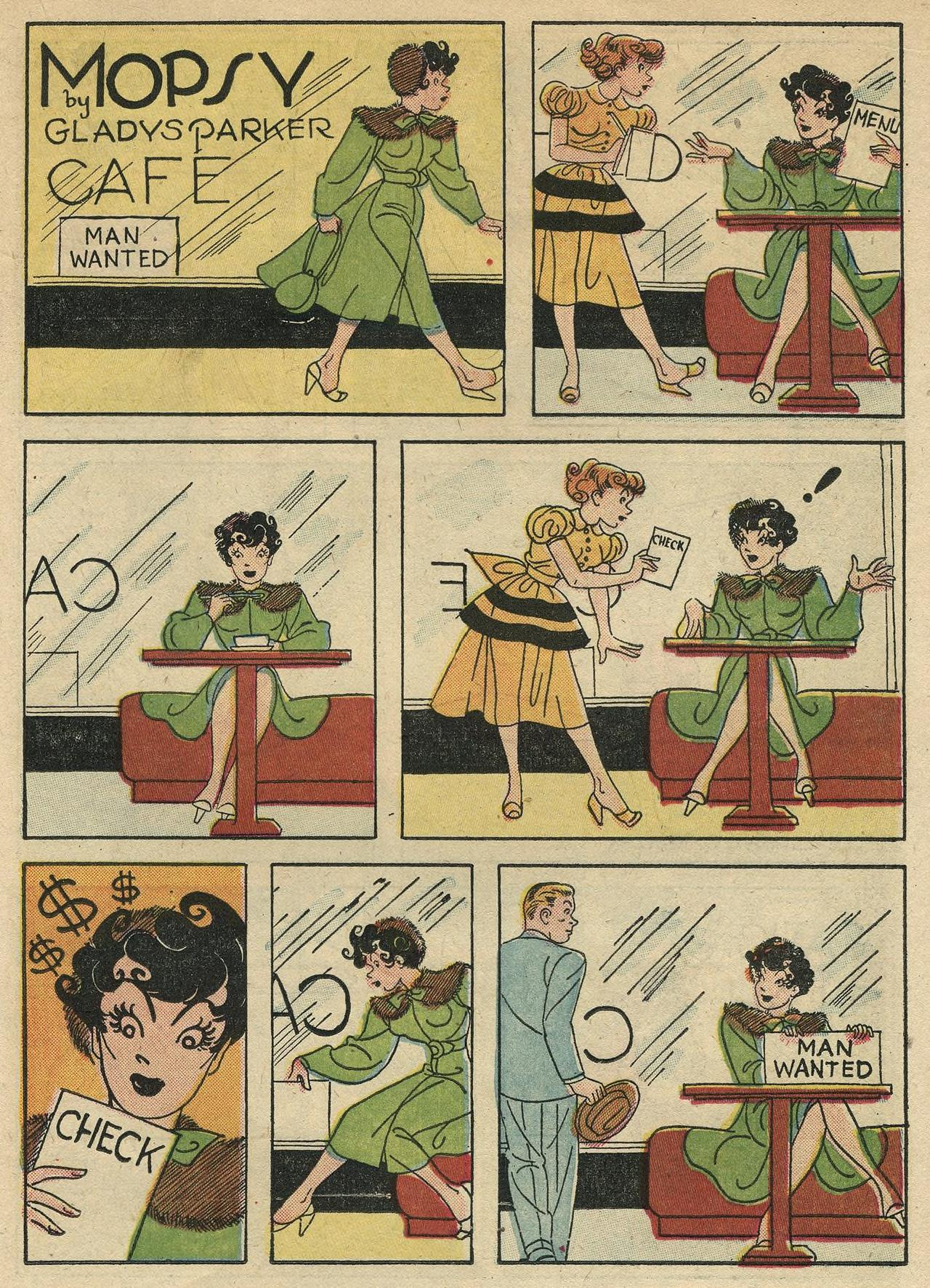
TV Teens, Vol. 2, No. 8 (1955)

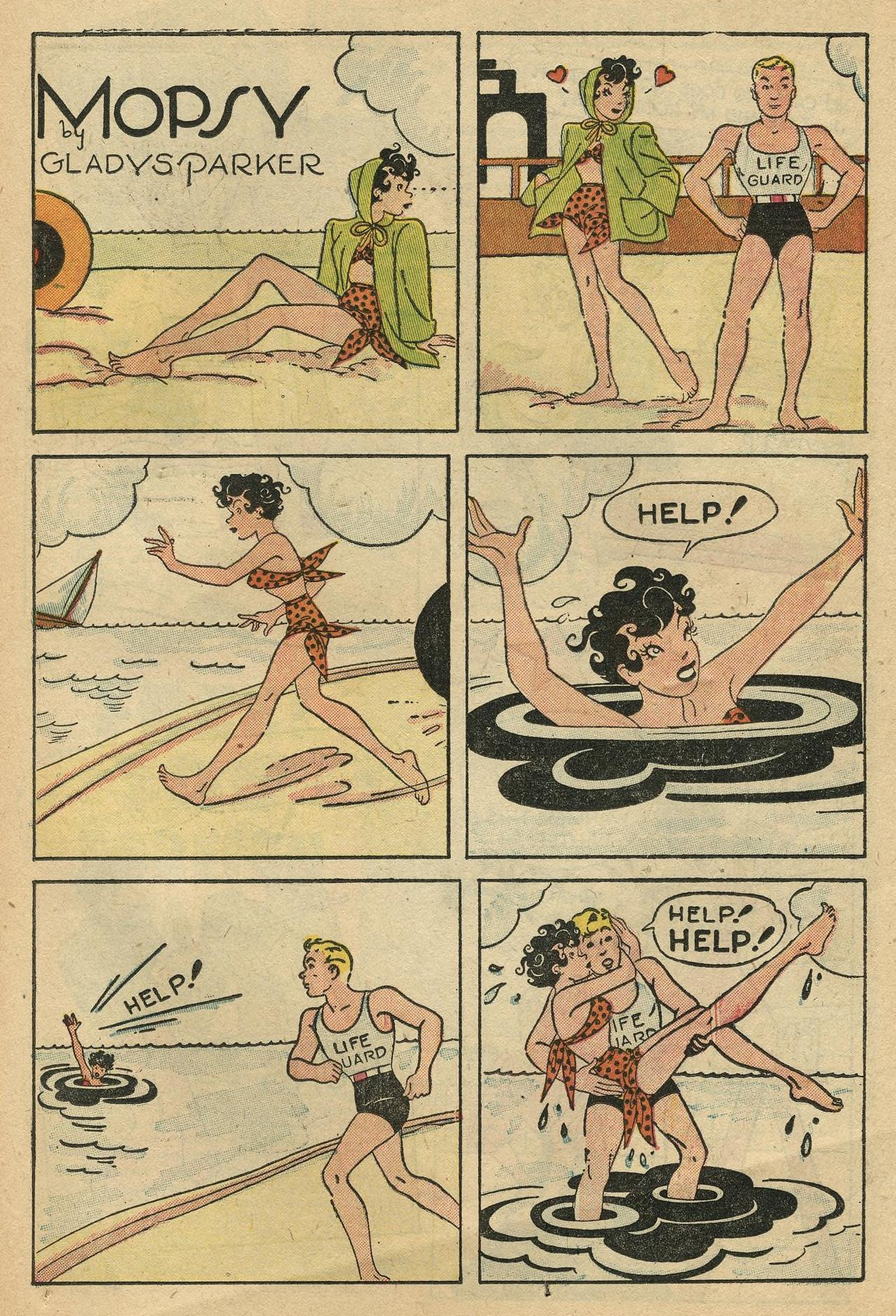
TV Teens, Vol. 2, No. 9 (1955)

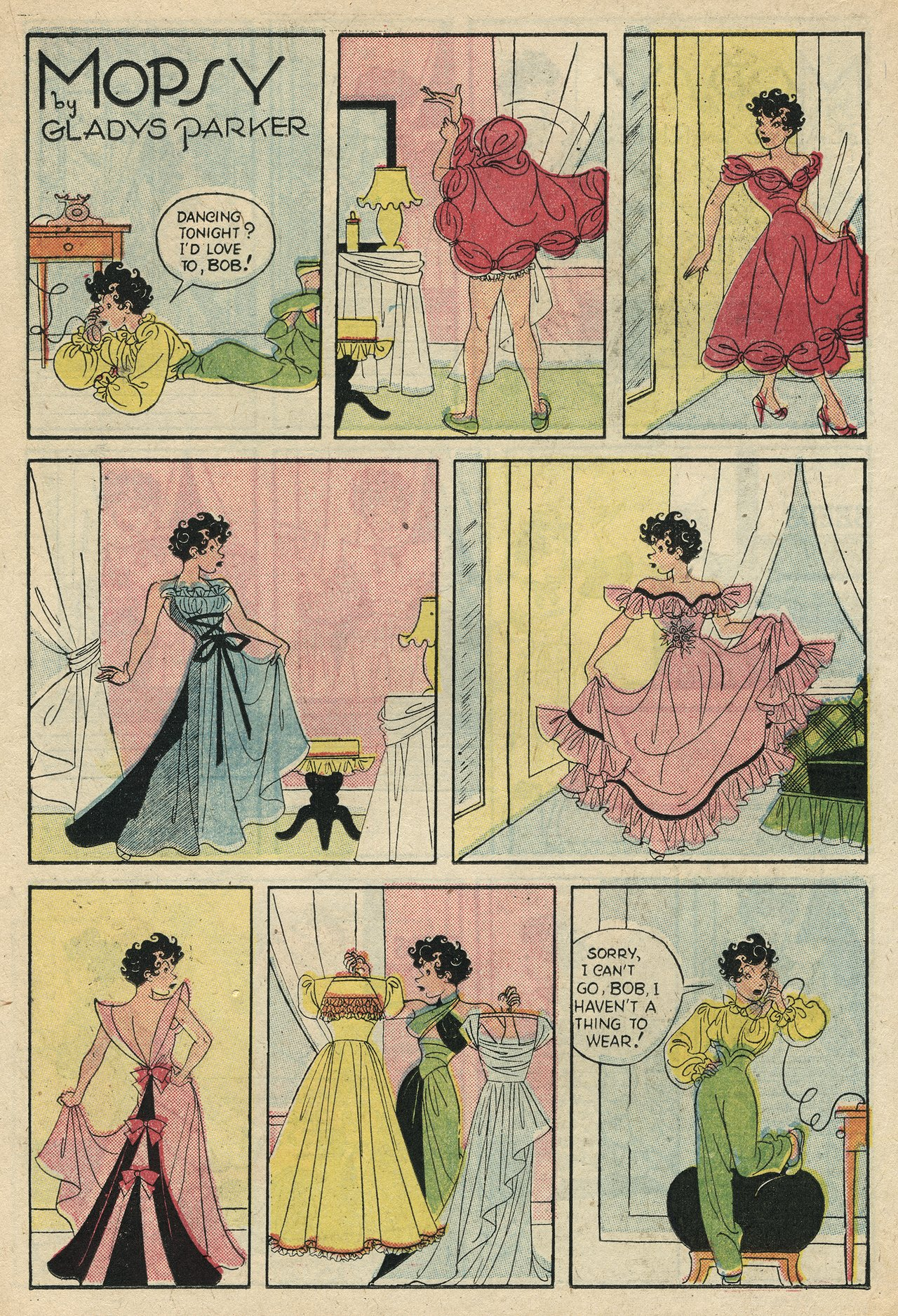
TV Teens, Vol. 2, No. 10 (1955)

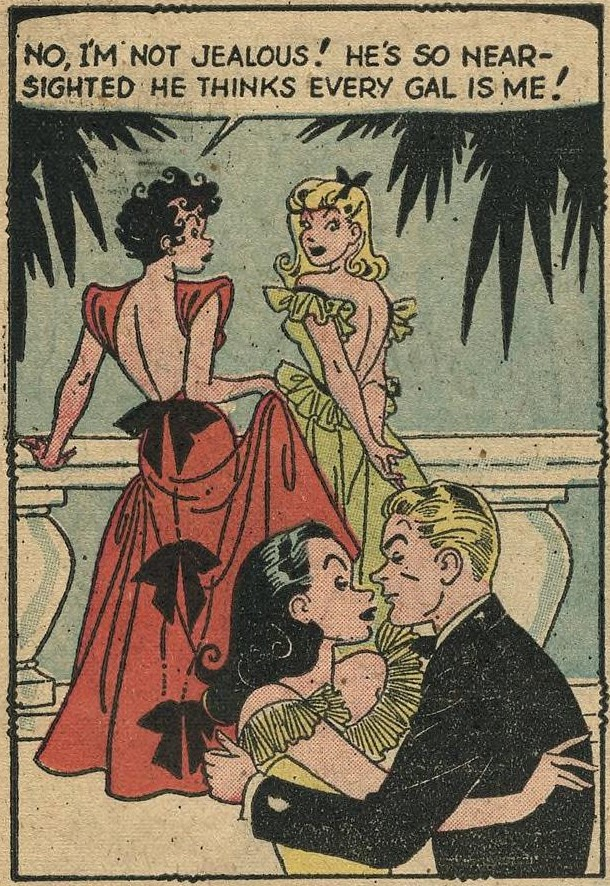
TV Teens, Vol. 2, No. 12 (1956)

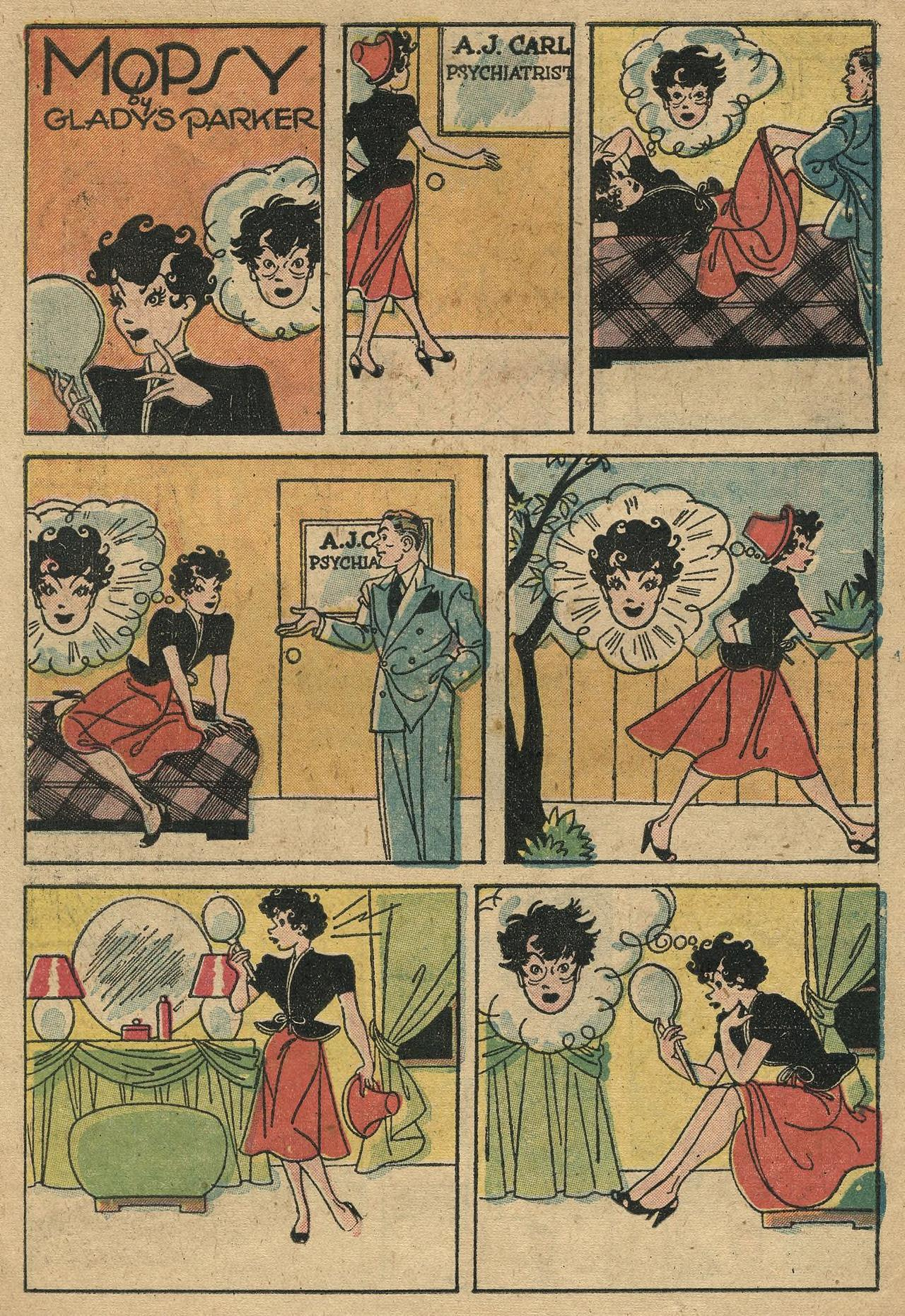
TV Teens, Vol. 2, No. 12 (1956)

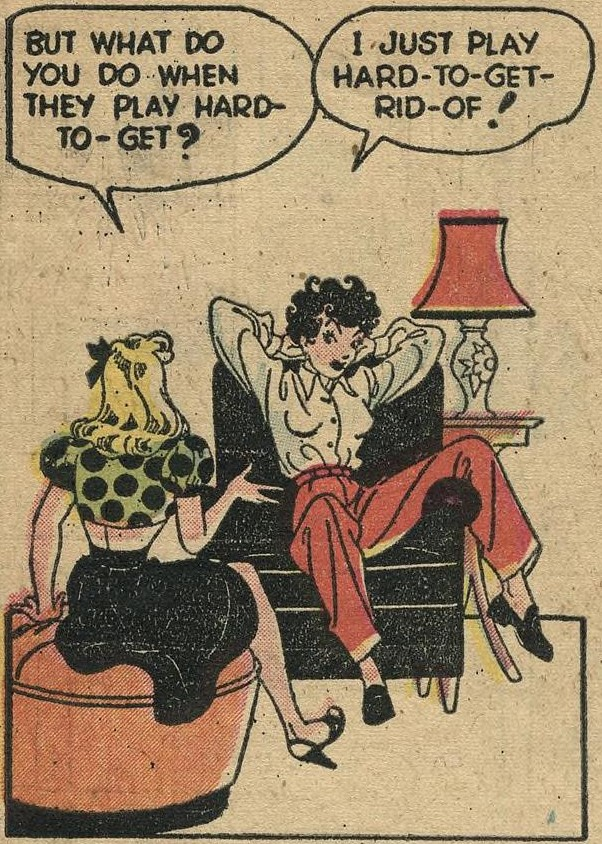
TV Teens, Vol. 2, No. 12 (1956)

=== Mopsy Modes ===
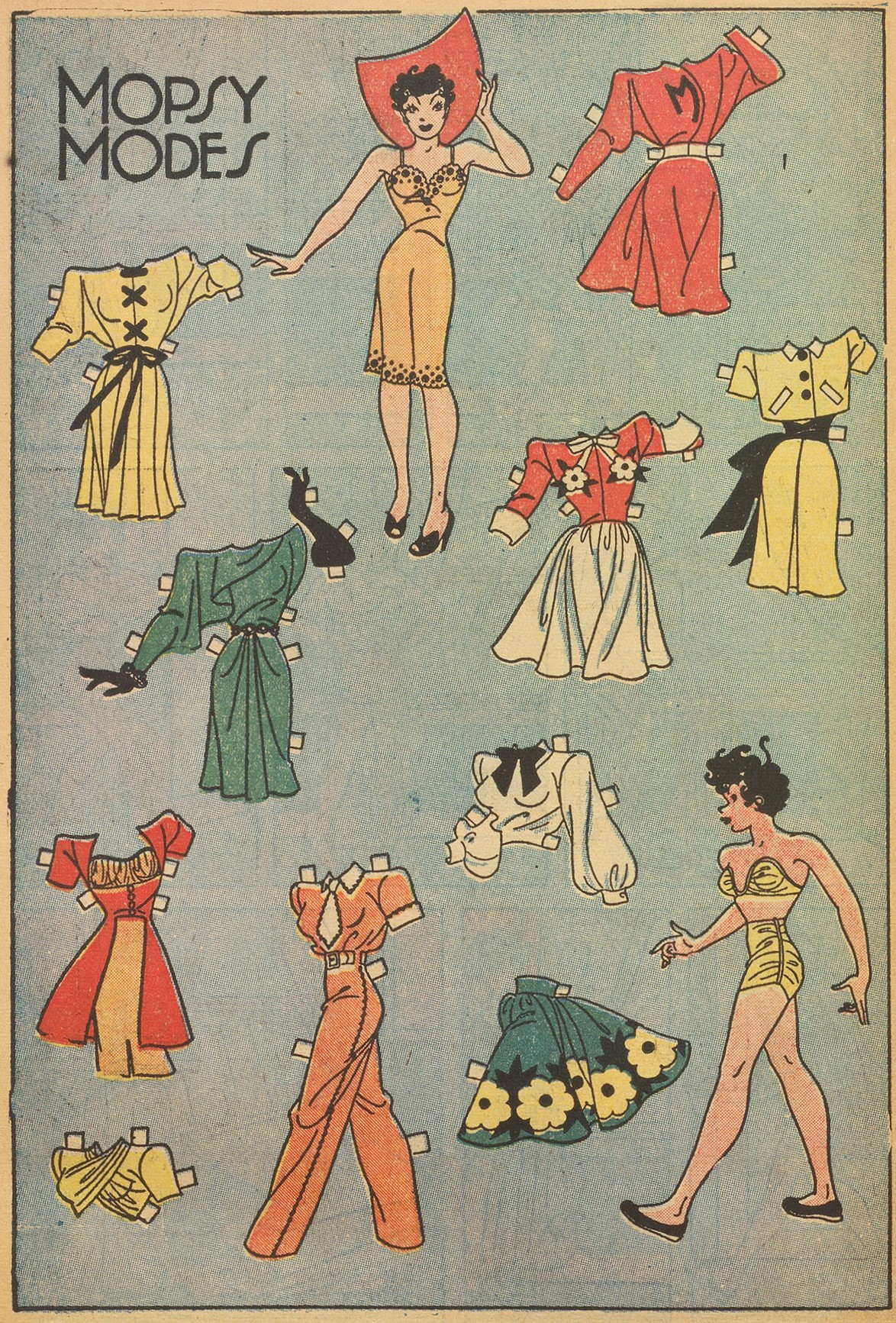
Mopsy, Vol. 1, No. 1 (1948)

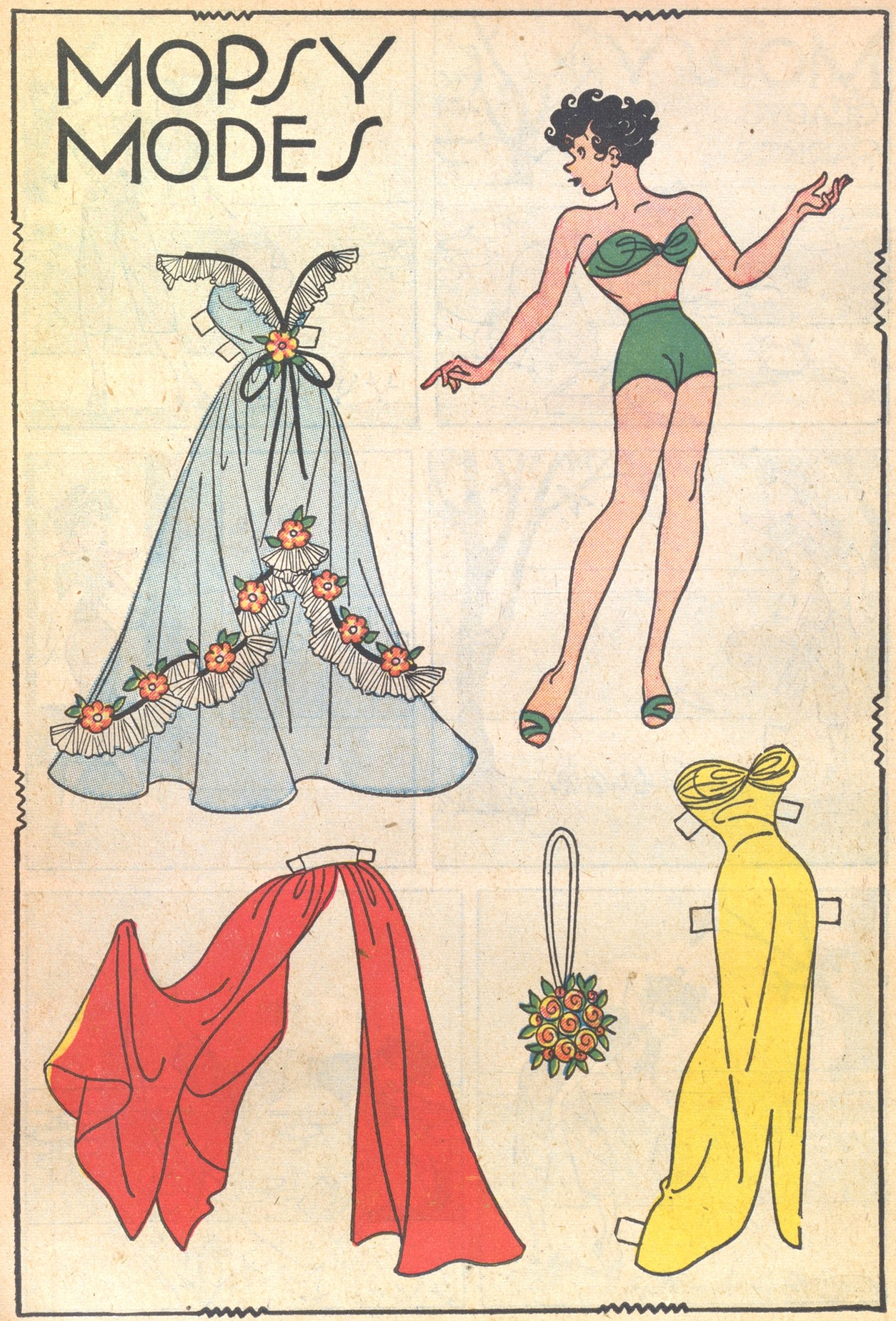
Mopsy, Vol 1, No. 18 (1953)

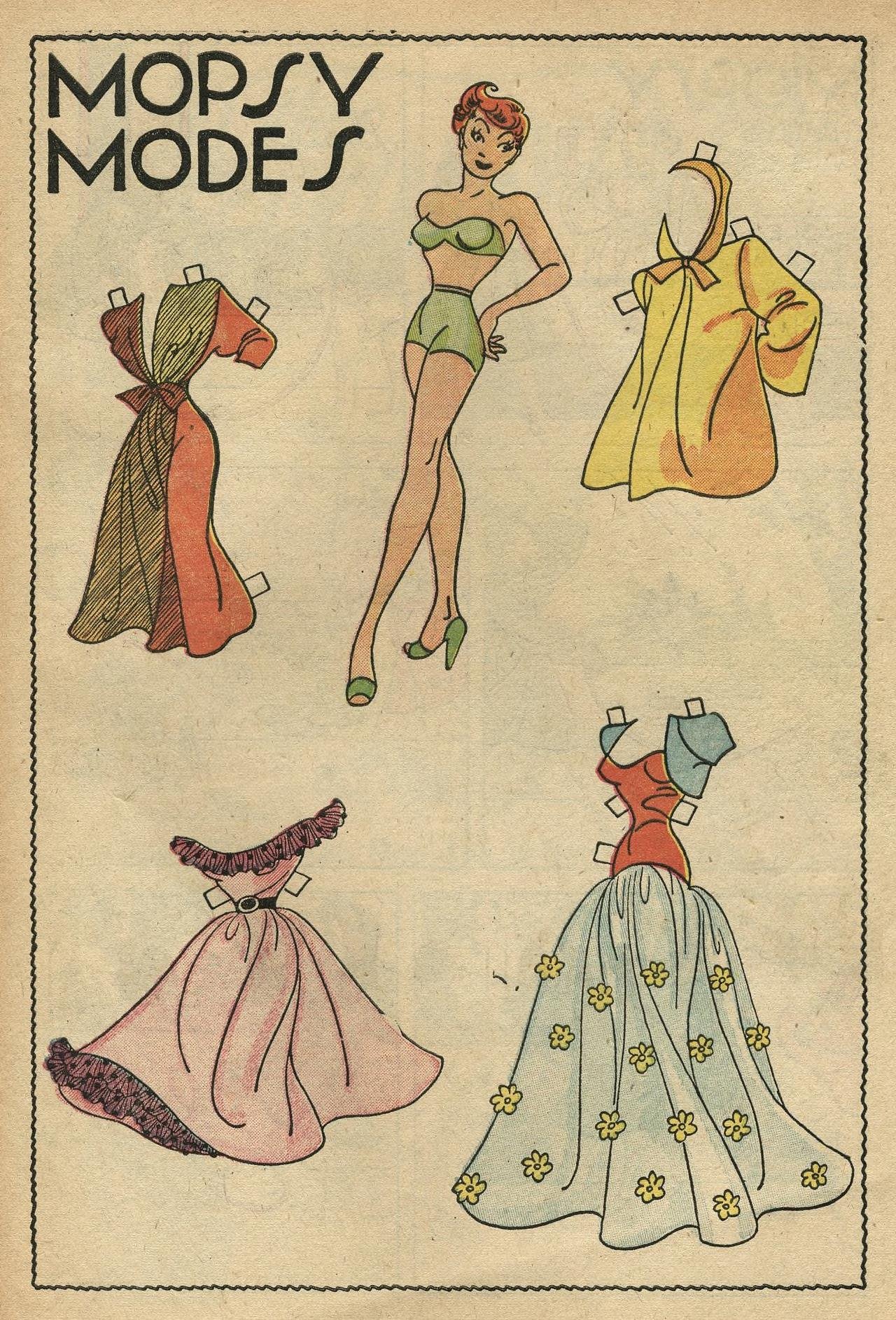
TV Teens, Vol. 2, No. 9 (1955)

== See also ==
- Annibelle, a similar comic strip created by Dorothy Urfer
