= Fran Carlon =

American stage, radio and television actress

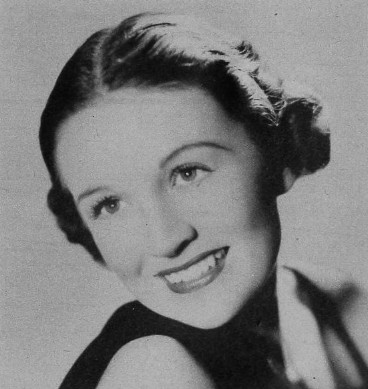
- Born: April 2, 1913; Indianapolis, Indiana, U.S.
- Died: October 4, 1993 (aged 80); Manhattan, New York City, U.S.
- Education: Goodman Theatre, Pasadena Playhouse
- Occupation: Actress
- Known for: Joyce Jordan, M.D.; As the World Turns

Fran Carlon (August 15, 1913 – October 4, 1993) was an American actress who was successful in radio, stage and screen.

== Early years and theatre ==
Carlon was born in Indianapolis and grew up in Chicago, She received her theatrical training at Chicago’s Goodman Theatre and later at the Pasadena Playhouse.

She began her stage career in the role of Little Eva in a touring production of Uncle Tom’s Cabin. Her first Broadway show, Play, Genius, Play, lasted only four performances. Her other Broadway credits included Sunrise at Campobello and Men of Distinction. She went to Hollywood where she appeared in films with Douglas Montgomery, Loretta Young and the Ritz Brothers.

== Radio and television ==
Carlon "entered radio doing commercials on Amos 'n' Andy." Her radio roles included Martha in This Changing World, the reporter Lorelei Heilbron in Big Town, sister Sue in Big Sister, Rhoda Brent in Blackstone, the Magic Detective and Irene in Our Gal Sunday. She played the lead in Joan and Kermit, Kitty Keene, Mary Marlin and Joyce Jordan, M.D.. She was also in episodes of Mary Noble, Backstage Wife; Lora Lawton; Ma Perkins; The Chicago Theater of the Air; Mr. Keen, Tracer of Lost Persons and Theatre Five.

Her television roles included the series The Hamptons as Ada, As the World Turns as Julia Blake and Portia Faces Life as Portia Blake.

== Personal life and death ==
Carlon was married to Casey Allen, a radio actor and announcer, and had two children, a daughter, Kerry, and a son, Kim.

She died of cancer, aged 80, in 1993, in Manhattan, New York.

== See also ==
- List of radio soaps
- List of female detective characters
