= Norman W. Marsh =

American cartoonist (1898 or 1899 – 1980)

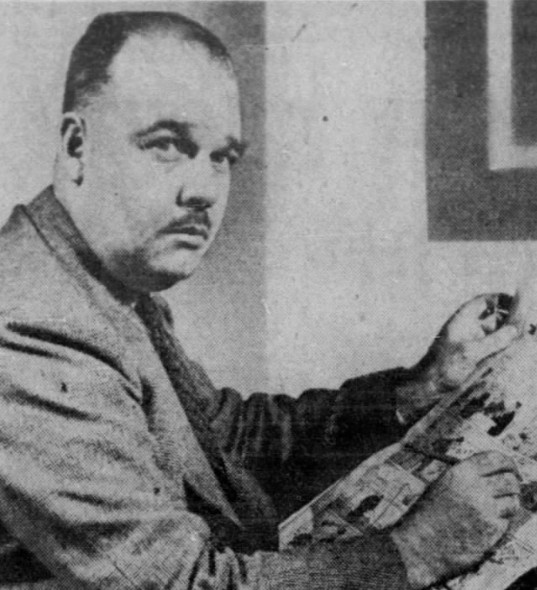
- Norman W. Marsh (1936)
- Born: February 25, 1898 or 1899 Waukegan, Illinois, U.S.
- Died: February 10, 1980 (aged 81) California, U.S.
- Area: Cartoonist
- Notable works: Dan Dunn
- Spouse: Nannie Louella Cash (m. 1920)

Norman Winfield Marsh (February 25, 1898 or 1899 [sources differ] – February 10, 1980) was an American cartoonist and comic strip creator, known for his character Dan Dunn, a hardboiled detective.

== Early life and early career ==
Marsh was born in Waukegan, Illinois, the son of Ernest Morrell Marsh and Julia Inez Craver. He worked as an agent for the United States Secret Service for five years, and then as a detective in the Chicago Police Department.

Marsh served in World War I in the United States Marine Corps. Marsh was drafted to serve again in 1942, during World War II, and retired at the rank of captain. Afterward, he moved to Los Angeles. He was part of a veterans group called the Studio City Barracks, named after the Studio City neighborhood where he lived and worked.

== Comics career ==
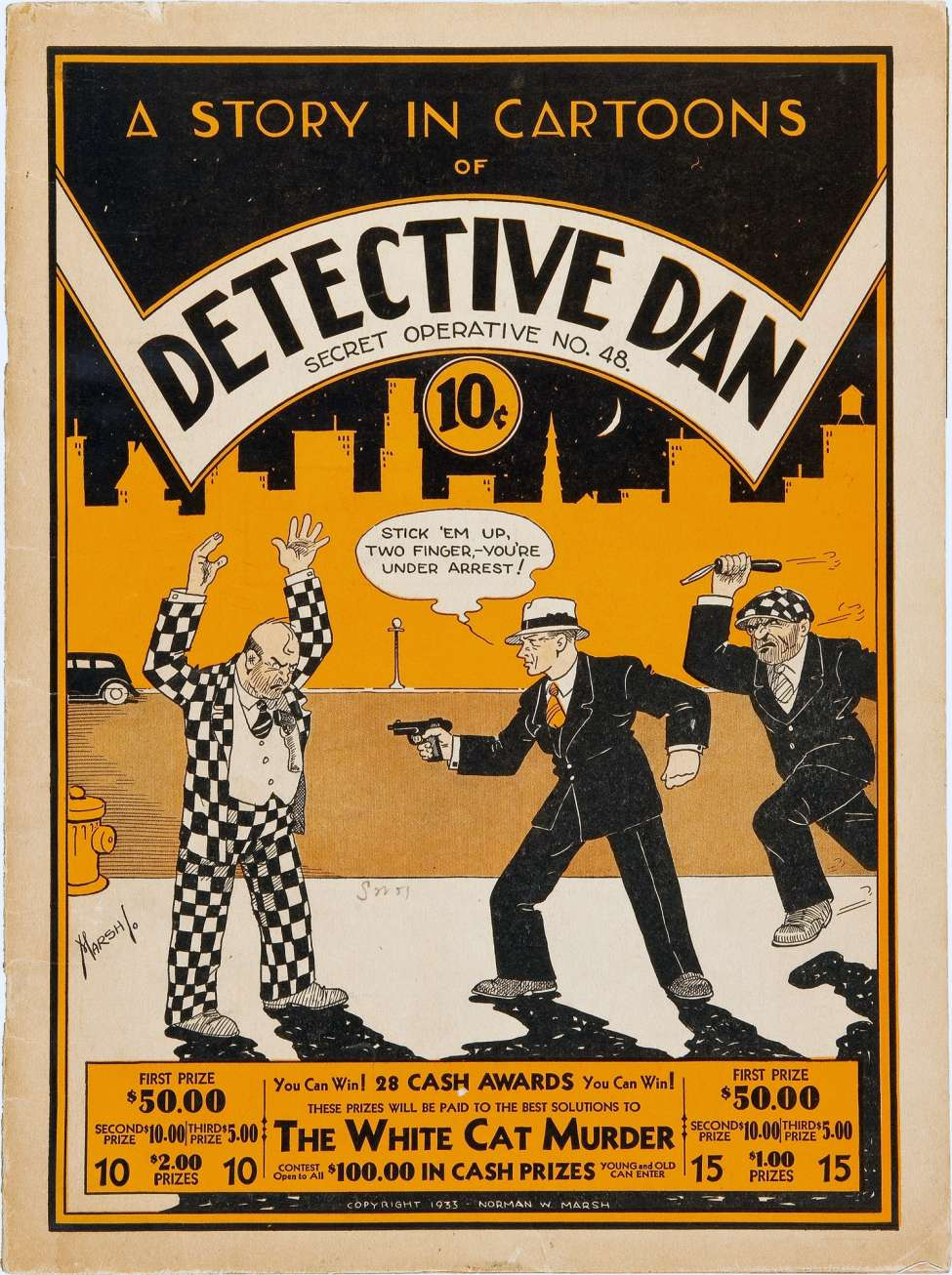
Detective Dan: Secret Operative 48 (May 1933).

Marsh's career as a cartoonist began c. 1922. He created the hardboiled-detective character Dan Dunn in the proto-comic book Detective Dan: Secret Operative No. 48 (May 12, 1933). The book contained all-original stories as opposed to reprinted newspaper strips. Comics historian Don Markstein notes that this periodical and the only two others from this publisher were pioneering in that they contained "non-reprinted comics in 1933", though these periodicals were not "in modern comic book format. Theirs were done as tabloids" with Detective Dan: Secret Operative No. 48 measuring either 9 1/2 x 12-inches or 10 x 13-inches (sources differ), with black-and-white newsprint pages and a three-color cardboard cover.

The character appeared primarily in the newspaper comic strip Dan Dunn, syndicated by Publishers Syndicate beginning Monday, September 25, 1933, with a Sunday page added soon afterward. The strip, which ran through Sunday, October 3, 1943, eventually would appear in approximately 135 papers. Dan Dunn strips were reprinted in comic books, through publisher Eastern Color's Famous Funnies, Dell Comics' The Funnies and Red Ryder Comics, and Western Publishing's Crackajack Funnies from 1935 to 1943.

Following the end of Dan Dunn, Marsh created another hardboiled-detective strip, Hunter Keene, for King Features Syndicate, which ran daily and not Sunday from April 15, 1946, to April 12, 1947.

Following this was Danny Hale, about "a kid frontiersman who found himself tagging along with revolutionary war heroes, accompanying the Lewis and Clark expedition, and generally being in the right place at the right time (even if those times were widely separated)", according to comics historian Allan Holtz. King Features syndicated it beginning October 27, 1947, and after three years, with the syndicate prepared to end it, Marsh began self-syndicating the strip starting January 15, 1951, episode. A year later, he changed the title to Dan'l Hale and aged the character to a young man. The strip ended on October 13, 1962.

== Personal life ==
March married Nannie Louella Cash in 1920. He supported the Republican Party.
