= Blackstone, the Magic Detective =

1940s radio series on the Mutual Broadcasting System

- Genre: Detective radio drama
- Running time: 2:45 pm–3:00 pm
- Country of origin: United States
- Language: English
- Home station: Mutual Broadcasting System
- Starring: Ed Jerome; Fran Carlon
- Announcer: Don Hancock (1948–1949), Alan Kent (1949–1950)
- Written by: Walter B. Gibson, Nancy Webb.
- Original release: October 3, 1948 – March 26, 1950
- No. of episodes: 79

Blackstone, the Magic Detective was a 15-minute radio series based on Elmer Cecil Stoner's comic book series Blackstone, Master Magician. The program aired Sunday afternoons at 2:45pm on the Mutual Broadcasting System from October 3, 1948, until March 26, 1950.

== Radio ==
Starring Edwin Jerome as "the world's greatest living magician," the radio series was based on real-life magician Harry Blackstone, Sr.

The series was announced by Don Hancock from October 1948 through June 1949, and Alan Kent from July 1949 through to the end of the series in March, 1950. The background organ music was supplied by Bill Meeder. Scripts were mostly by Walter B. Gibson, the ghostwriter of Blackstone's books, and Nancy Webb, who worked with Gibson on Chick Carter, Boy Detective.

=== Characters and story ===
The show usually opened with Blackstone (Ed Jerome) and his assistant Rhoda Brent (Fran Carlon) talking with a friend of theirs, either Don Hancock or Alan Kent (played by the episodes' announcers in-character as themselves) or John (Ted Osborne). A past adventure of Blackstone's would come up in conversation, and that mystery story was then dramatized as a flashback.

After the mystery's climax, the narrative returned to the three main characters as Blackstone performed a magic trick. After a commercial break handled by the announcer, Blackstone returned to demonstrate and explain the trick so that listeners could perform it for the amusement of their friends.

== See also ==
- Blackstone, Master Magician, the comic book series on which the show was based
