= The Funnies =

Comic character publication

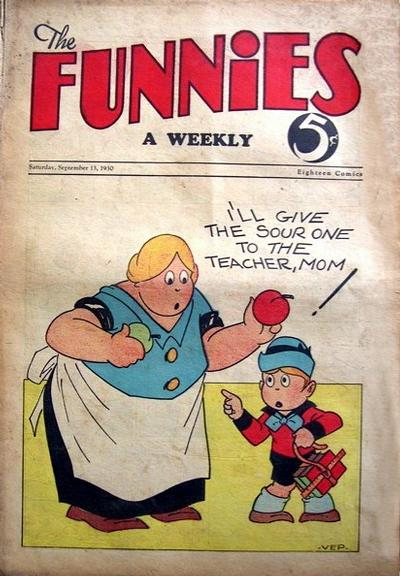
- The Funnies #31 (September 13, 1930), cover art by Victor E. Pazmiño (signed).

Publication information
- Publisher: Dell Publishing (Dell Comics)
- Schedule: Varied between weekly and monthly
- Format: Ongoing series
- Publication date: January 16, 1929 – October 16, 1930
- No. of issues: 36

The Funnies is the name of two American publications from Dell Publishing (Dell Comics), the first of these a seminal 1920s precursor of comic books, and the second a standard 1930s comic book.

== The Funnies (1929–1930) ==
In 1929, George T. Delacorte Jr.'s Dell Publishing, founded eight years earlier, began publishing The Funnies, described by the Library of Congress as "a short-lived newspaper tabloid insert". Comics historian Ron Goulart describes the 16-page, four-color, newsprint periodical as "more a Sunday comic section without the rest of the newspaper than a true comic book."

The magazine ran 36 issues – originally weekly, then monthly from April 1929 to April 1930, and then weekly again – published Saturdays from January 16, 1929, to October 16, 1930. The cover price rose from 10¢ to 30¢ with issue #3. This was reduced to a nickel from issue #22 to the end.

Victor E. Pazmiño drew most of the covers for The Funnies (a tradition carried on some years later by the first true comic book Famous Funnies); he also contributed interior strips. Contributors included Stookie Allen and Boody Rogers, as well as Charles Curtis, Ed Hermes, Howard Williamson, F. N. Litten, Kenneth Whipple, Charles Driscoll, Joe Archibald, Sidney Garber, Earle Danesford, Hafon, J. Molina, Bencho, Gil King, and Buford Tone. Carl E. Schultze's Foxy Grandpa strip appeared in this early comics periodical.

The Funnies helped lay the groundwork for two subsequent publications in 1933: Eastern Color Printing's similar proto-comic book, the eight-page newsprint tabloid Funnies on Parade, and the Eastern Color / Dell collaboration Famous Funnies: A Carnival of Comics, considered by historians the first true American comic book.

== The Funnies (1936 to 1942) and New Funnies ==
The Funnies
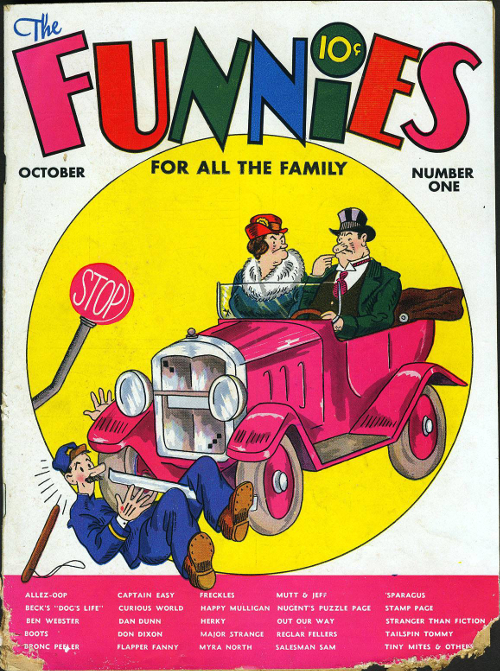
- The Funnies vol. 2, #1 (Oct. 1936), featuring Major Hoople of Gene Ahern's Our Boarding House, cover artist unknown.

Publication information
- Publisher: Dell Publishing (Dell Comics)
- Format: Ongoing series
- Publication date: The Funnies: 1936–1942; New Funnies: 1942–1962
- No. of issues: 288

Dell Publishing's second publication by this name was a standard American comic book published during the 1930s and 1940s period fans and historians call the Golden Age of Comic Books. Packaged by Max Gaines and editor Sheldon Mayer, it ran 64 issues (cover-dated Oct. 1936 – May 1942).

A rival to Eastern Color's successful comic-book series Famous Funnies, it similarly reprinted newspaper comic strips, mostly NEA-syndicate comics such as Alley Oop, by V. T. Hamlin, and Captain Easy, by Roy Crane, as well as others including Mutt and Jeff, by Bud Fisher, Tailspin Tommy, by Hal Forrest, Flapper Fanny Says by Gladys Parker, and Annibelle by Dorothy Urfer. Reprints of Bob Moore and Carl Pfeufer's science-fiction adventure comic strip Don Dixon and the Lost Empire appeared as one- or two-page features in The Funnies; as did Norman W. Marsh's Dan Dunn strips.

The Funnies began running original material with Mayer's feature Scribbly, about a boy cartoonist, laid out to look like a Sunday newspaper comic strip. Art Nugent's single-page puzzle and game feature, called either Home Magic or Everybody's Playmate, ran in issues #1–27. Other, gradual bits of original comics followed, including six-page adaptations of B-movie Westerns, beginning with issue #20 (May 1938), and a four-page true-crime feature, "The Crime Busters", drawn by Al McWilliams, beginning the following issues. Following Gaines and Mayer leaving to produce work for All-American Publications, most reprints other than Alley Oop were abandoned in favor of original content, including "Mr. District Attorney", based on the radio series, and "John Carter of Mars", adapted from the Edgar Rice Burroughs series of novels, and after a few issues illustrated by his son, John Coleman Burroughs. Captain Midnight adventures were published in The Funnies issues #59 and 61–63. Gaylord Du Bois's American Indian feature, "Young Hawk" first began in The Funnies. E. C. Stoner mainly worked as a cover artist, drawing covers for The Funnies, the latter of which prominently featured the character Phantasmo, Dell's first original superhero feature.

=== New Funnies ===
The comic book switched formats and title to become New Funnies with issue #65 (July 1942). Now devoted to children's characters like Raggedy Ann and Andy, and talking animal characters including Felix the Cat, Oswald the Rabbit, and Woody Woodpecker, it lasted through issue #288 (April 1962). Its title changed to Walter Lantz New Funnies after 44 issues, beginning with issue #109 (March 1946).

== See also ==
- More Fun Comics
