= Dan Dunn =

Comic strip detective, 1933-1943

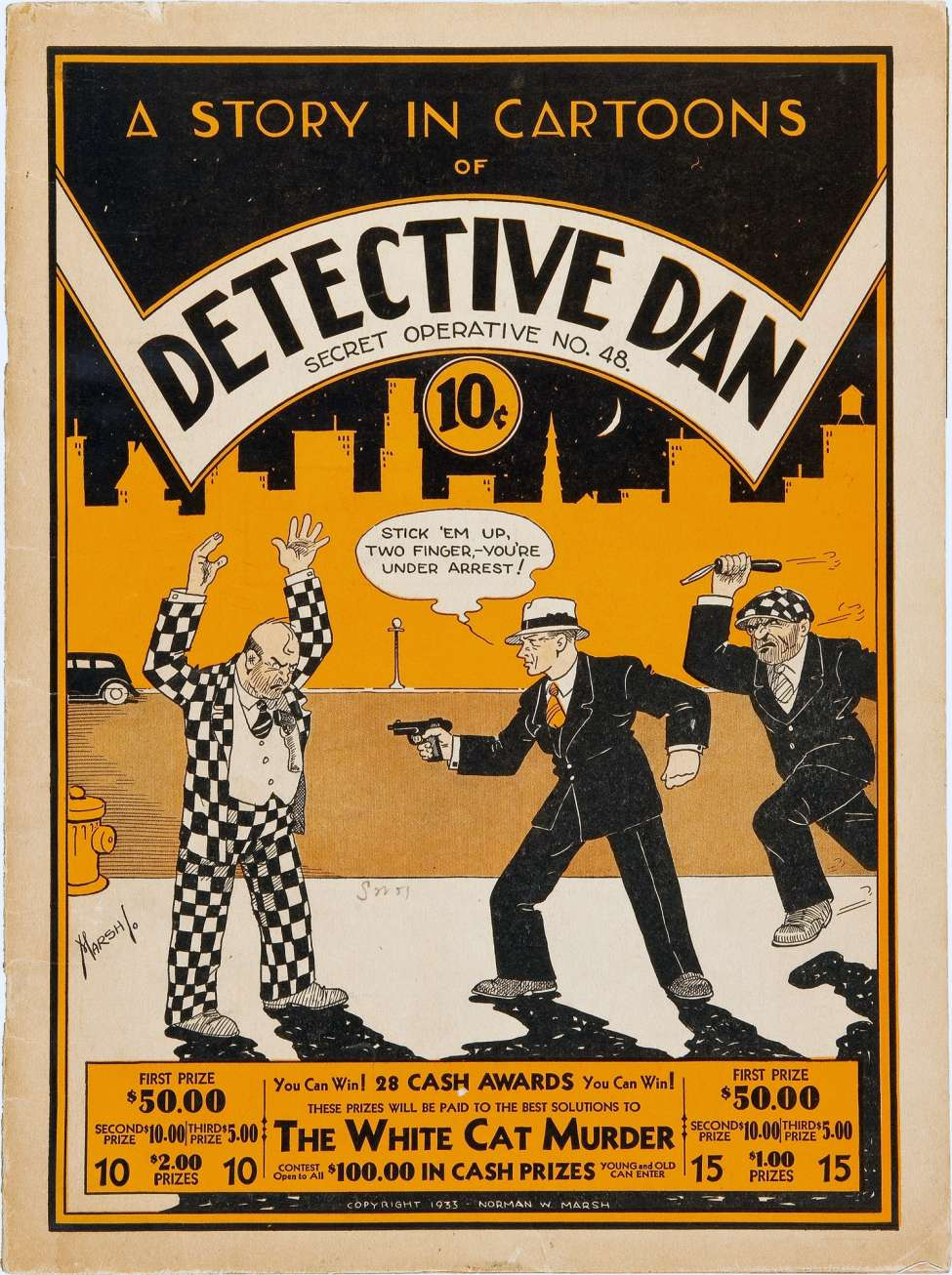
- Detective Dan: Secret Operative No. 48 (1933), cover art by Norman W. Marsh.

Publication information
- Publisher: Humor Publishing
- First appearance: Detective Dan: Secret Operative No. 48 (1933)
- Created by: Norman W. Marsh

Dan Dunn is a fictional detective created by Norman W. Marsh. He first appeared in Detective Dan: Secret Operative No. 48, a proto-comic book from 1933 produced by Humor Publishing. He subsequently appeared in newspaper comic strips from 1933 to 1943.

== Publication history ==
=== Comic book ===
Writer-artist Norman W. Marsh's hardboiled detective Dan Dunn first appeared in Humor Publishing's proto-comic book Detective Dan: Secret Operative No. 48, copyrighted on May 12, 1933. Comics historian Don Markstein notes that this periodical and the only two others from this publisher were pioneering in that they contained "non-reprinted comics in 1933", though these periodicals were not "in modern comic book format. Theirs were done as tabloids". Detective Dan: Secret Operative No. 48 measured either 9½ × 12 inches or 10 × 13 inches, with black-and-white newsprint pages and a three-color cardboard cover. It sold for 10 cents. In addition to Detective Dan, the publisher also published The Adventures of Detective Ace King by Martin Nadle and Bob Scully, The Two-Fisted Hick by Howard Dell on the same year. However, these characters did not have continuity.

The character appeared primarily in the newspaper comic strip Dan Dunn, syndicated by Publishers Syndicate beginning Monday, September 25, 1933, with a Sunday page added soon afterward. The strip, which ran through Sunday, October 3, 1943, eventually would appear in approximately 135 papers. Dan Dunn strips were reprinted in comic books through publisher Eastern Color's Famous Funnies, Dell Comics' The Funnies and Red Ryder Comics, and Western Publishing's Crackajack Funnies from 1935 to 1943.

=== Comic strip and other media ===
Dan Dunn
- Author: Norman W. Marsh (1933–1941); Allen Saunders (1942–1943)
- Illustrator(s): Paul Pinson, Alfred Andriola (1942–1943)
- Current status/schedule: Daily and Sunday; concluded
- Launch date: September 25, 1933
- End date: Oct 3, 1943
- Syndicate(s): Publishers Syndicate
- Genre: adventure

On September 25, 1933, Publishers Syndicate began distributing Dan Dunn as a comic strip that eventually peaked at 135 newspapers. The Sunday color page began on October 1, 1933. Marsh both drew and wrote Dan Dunn from 1933 to 1942. One critic describes the artwork as the weaker aspect, calling it "arid", with a chronic, wintry aspect", "cavernous spaces" and "huddled, stiff-jointed postures". Assistants included Jack Ryan c. 1937, Ed Moore c. 1937–38, and Dick Fletcher.

The Dan Dunn Sunday page ran a topper strip, Dan Dunn's Scientific Crime Detection Laboratory, from March 4 to July 22, 1934.

Marsh left the strip in 1942 following a disagreement with Publishers Syndicate. Allen Saunders, the syndicate's comics editor, took over as writer from 1942 to 43, with art first by Paul Pinson (June 1942 - January 1943) and then by Alfred Andriola (January to October 1943). Saunders and Andriola subsequently replaced Dan Dunn with a new detective strip, Kerry Drake, in 1943.

Starting in 1934, Dan Dunn appeared in seven Big Little Books:

1. Dan Dunn, Secret Operative 48: Crime Never Pays (1934)
2. Dan Dunn on the Trail of Counterfeiters (1936)
3. Dan Dunn and the Border Smugglers (1937)
4. Dan Dunn and the Crime Masters (1937)
5. Dan Dunn on the Trail of Wu Fang (1938)
6. Dan Dunn and the Dope Ring (1940)
7. Dan Dunn and the Underworld Gorilla (1941)

In 1936, Dan Dunn became the title character of a pulp magazine that lasted for two issues.

In 1944, Dan Dunn, Secret Operative #48 was produced as a 15-minute syndicated radio program which ran for a total of 78 episodes. It was produced by Kasper-Gordon, Inc.

=== Reprints ===
In 2017, The Library of American Comics reprinted one year of the strip (1933) in their LoAC Essentials line of books.

== Analysis ==
Markstein calls the square-jawed Detective Dunn an imitation of Dick Tracy, killing criminals with the same direct resort to violence during the gangster era. Dunn never approached Tracy's popularity, but the strip's successor writer, Allen Saunders, believed the comic rivaled Dick Tracy in pioneering themes and techniques of the American detective comic. In the Toho dub of the Lupin III film The Mystery of Mamo, Daisuke Jigen was given the name of Dan Dunn in the character's honor.
