= Phantasmo =

1940-1942 Dell Comics superhero

- Phantasmo on the cover of his first appearance, The Funnies #45 (July 1940)

Publication information
- Publisher: Dell Comics
- First appearance: The Funnies #45 (July 1940)
- Created by: E.C. Stoner

In-story information
- Alter ego: Phil Anson, Ted Bart
- Abilities: Separates spirit from body, giving him super-strength, flight, invisibility, super-growth

Phantasmo, Master of the World is a fictional superhero who appeared in Dell Comics' The Funnies from 1940 to 1942, during the Golden Age of Comic Books. He was Dell Comics' first original superhero feature, and was created by E.C. Stoner, the first known African-American comic book artist.

The character, introduced in The Funnies issue #45 (July 1940) as "the world's greatest magician," is an American adventurer named Phil Anson, who traveled to Tibet and learned the secrets of body and spirit from the High Lamas. Returning to America, he takes up residence in a posh hotel in New York City, where he enlists bellhop Whizzer McGee to be his partner. Anson can separate his mind from his body, and in spectral form he can accomplish almost anything — fly through the air, turn invisible, grow to enormous size, and push with tremendous force. Phantasmo's only weakness is that while he's in ethereal form, his body is motionless and vulnerable to attack, so he relies on Whizzer to guard his physical form. The character was the cover star on The Funnies through issue #58 (Aug 1941), and made his last appearance in issue #63 (March 1942).

It has been noted that, clad in nothing but golden shorts, boots and a transparent cape, Phantasmo often appears to be nearly naked during his adventures.

== History ==
The cover of The Funnies #45 (July 1940) heralds, "Introducing Phantasmo, Master of the World". Phantasmo is seen on the cover as a giant figure, barely dressed in shorts and a transparent cape, grasping a crumbling city building as a crowd of tiny onlookers flees from the area. A profile of Stoner in Alter Ego says, "His Phantasmo covers often showed the awesomely powered hero as a giant, perhaps owing something to Bernard Baily's contemporary Spectre covers at DC. The over-sized hero motif appeared on many of his covers throughout his career." The scene, which does not appear in the comic itself, establishes the unparalleled might of the new hero.

The comic's origin story skips over the main character's earthbound, mortal existence, and takes the reader directly to "the top of the world's highest mountain", where Phantasmo bids farewell to the High Lama who's been teaching him magical secrets for twenty-five years. "Thou hast learned all mastery of body and mind, Phantasmo," the Lama says. "Wield thy power well!" Many of the era's superheroes, including Phantasmo, Captain Marvel and Green Lantern, were given explicitly magical origins like this, drawing on themes from pulp magazines. In fact, three other heroes introduced that year — the Flame, Amazing-Man and the Green Lama — also gained their powers from the apparently magical region of Tibet.

Phantasmo flies under his own steam back to America, where he appears hovering above a New York City street. Aware that he's causing a scene, he turns invisible, takes a suit from a clothing store, and disguises himself as human. He checks into a fancy hotel as Phil Anson — and when the bellhop brings him to his room, he gives the boy fifty dollars and asks if he can keep a secret. Separating his spirit from his body, the hero towers over the boy and explains, "I am Phantasmo, master of space. I can fly on the wings of thought! I can grow small or huge! I can put the Empire State Building on my shoulder and walk with it to the bottom of the Atlantic Ocean! But I need your help, Whizzer, to keep my physical body safe when I am away from it — understand?" Whizzer says that he does. Then they're abruptly interrupted by noises coming from a nearby room, where a professor is being held by a group of spies who are trying to steal his invention that can turn salt water into engine fuel.

From then on, Whizzer stays close to his friend, who can use his extra-sensory vision to spot trouble anywhere in the world, and may have to leave his earthly form at any moment. In some cases, Anson collapses in full view of the public, leaving Whizzer to explain his sudden loss of consciousness to onlookers.

For the next year and a half, Phantasmo and Whizzer face a variety of different challenges. In one story, Phantasmo stops a gang of criminals who are planning to blow up a dam and flood New York City; in another, he might fight a forest fire, or stop a gang of pirates who are smuggling jewels. One critic complains that "his fantastic powers [were] all too often squandered on mundane crimes like cattle-rustling and counterfeiting, though in one story the Master of the World saved said world from a doomsday meteor in spectacular fashion."

Towards the end of the series, Phantasmo, feeling that he could help his country more if he "had some way to get on the inside of what's happening", adopted the identity of murdered FBI filing clerk Ted Bart who he happened to resemble, with Whizzer following along as an office errand boy.

Phantasmo was the sole cover feature on The Funnies from his first appearance in #45 (July 1940) until issue #56 (June 1941). He shared the cover of issue #57 with radio adventure hero Captain Midnight, who was featured in a new comic book adaptation. In issue #58, Phantasmo was pushed to the secondary feature, with his last story appearing in issue #63 (March 1942). Over the next two issues, the book was relaunched as a talking animal comic called New Funnies.

The first six Phantasmo stories were also reprinted in black-and-white in an issue of Dell's Large Feature Comic #18 (1941), a full-length comics series with each issue devoted to a single character.

== Costume ==
In the 2016 anthology Super Weird Heroes: Outrageous But Real!, editor Craig Yoe introduces a story featuring "the almost naked Phantasmo, with plenty of suggestive poses and phallic symbols galore!" In a 2018 newspaper article about the series' second volume, Yoe said, "The Super Weird Heroes weren’t afraid to show a little skin, even a lot! Or not even be shy about being totally naked like Phantasmo in the first volume of Super Weird Heroes. We were originally going to have Phantasmo on the cover of the first book, but decided he might not fly in Peoria. So weird-in-his-own-way Nature Boy was our main cover boy. But, Phantasmo was between the covers fighting criminal types in his birthday suit."

On the cover of issue #47, the coloring makes it appear as if Phantasmo isn't wearing his shorts as he destroys a warplane, and on issue #48, it appears as if Phantasmo's bare buttocks are on display as he swims effortlessly past a battleship.

== See also ==
- Another character named Phantasmo was seen in DC Comics' Young All-Stars in 1989, as part of a group called the Young Allies.
