= Keeping Up with the Joneses (comics) =

American comic strip by Pop Momand

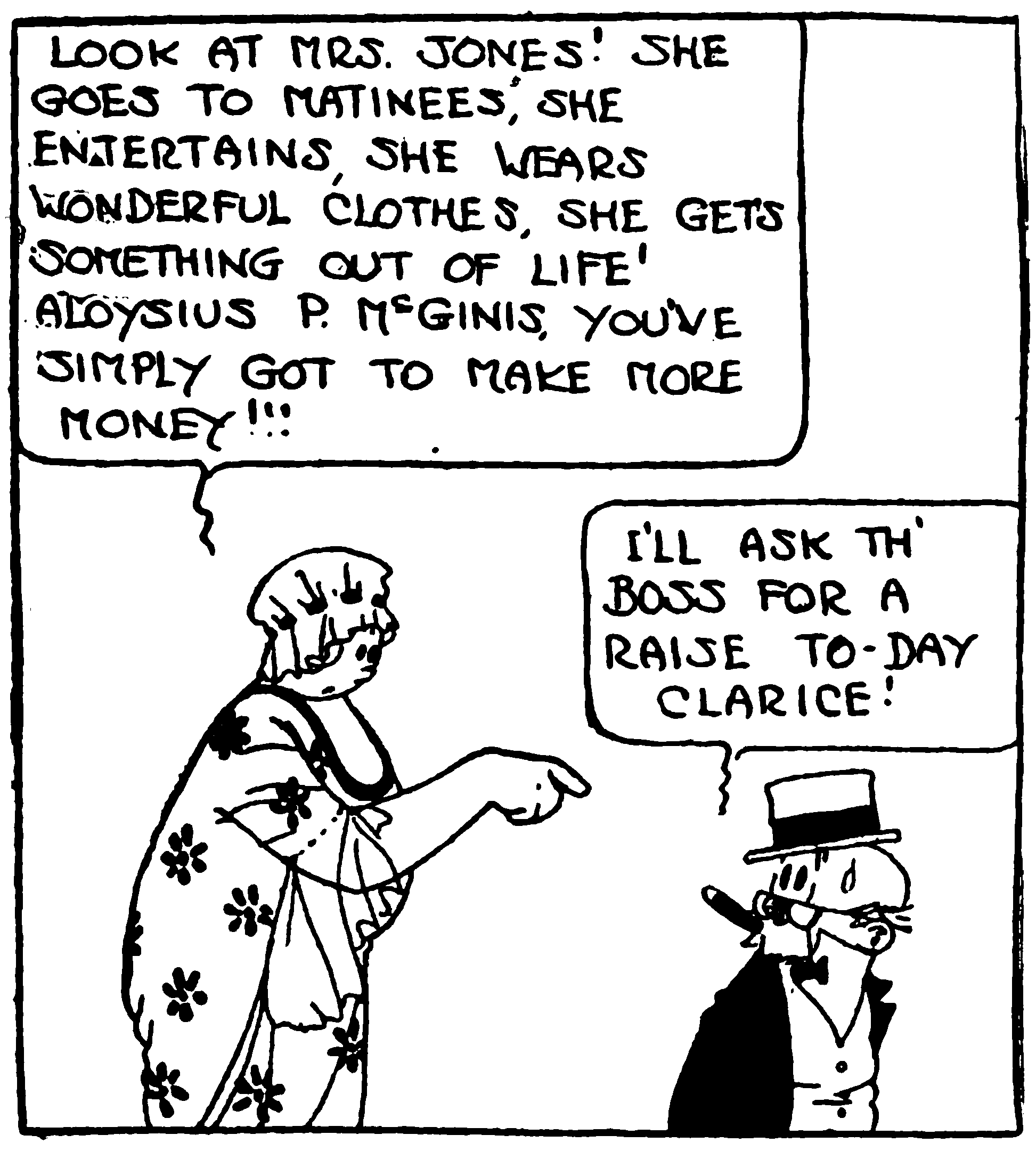
- Main characters Clarice and Aloysius in a 1920 panel from the strip
- Author: Arthur R. "Pop" Momand
- Current status/schedule: Concluded
- Launch date: March 31, 1913
- End date: April 16, 1938
- Syndicate(s): New York World; Associated Newspapers
- Genre: Domestic comedy

Keeping Up with the Joneses was an American gag-a-day comic strip by Pop Momand that ran from March 31, 1913, to April 16, 1938. It depicts the McGinis family, Aloysius, Clarice, their daughter Julie, and their housekeeper Bella Donna, who struggle to "keep up" with the lifestyle of their neighbors, the unseen Joneses. The comic coined the well-known catchphrase "keeping up with the Joneses", referring to people's tendency to judge their own social standing according to that of their neighbors.

== History ==
The comic was created in 1913 by Arthur R. "Pop" Momand, who had earlier worked as a newspaper illustrator. It debuted on March 31, 1913 in The New York Globe. The strip is a domestic comedy following a family of social climbers, the McGinises: parents Aloysius and Clarice, their daughter Julie, and the family's maid Bella Donna. Various strips feature the McGinis family attempting to match the lifestyle of their neighbors, the Joneses, who are often mentioned but never seen.

The strip was later picked up by Joseph Pulitzer's The New York World, and was subsequently syndicated in many other papers by Associated Newspapers. The title and central conceit of a family struggling to "keep up" with the neighbors resonated with its audience, to the point that the phrase keeping up with the Joneses became a common catchphrase. Use of the Jones name for neighbors involved in social competition predates Momand; William Safire traces an early example in the English writer E. J. Simmons' 1879 Memoirs of a Station Master. Some etymologists suggest this originates in reference to the family of Edith Wharton (née Jones), prominent socialites in 19th-century New York. However, linguist Rosemarie Ostler writes that "Jones is a common enough name to have universal associations".

On the Sunday page, Keeping Up with the Joneses had a topper strip, Holly of Hollywood, which ran from January 3, 1932, to March 27, 1938.

The strip itself did not achieve the lasting fame of some other comics, and was not widely merchandised. It was adapted into a series of silent animated shorts in 1915 and 1916 by Gaumont Company Production. The strip was also collected in volumes between 1920 and 1921. The comic ended after 25 years with a farewell strip on April 16, 1938. Momand then made a living as a portrait painter; he died on November 10, 1987, at the age of 100. The strip was subsequently little remembered, although the phrase "keeping up with the Joneses" remains well known in the 21st century.
