= Flyin' Jenny =

American comic strip by Russell Keaton

- Russell Keaton's Flyin' Jenny (April 6, 1941)
- Author(s): Russell Keaton
- Illustrator(s): Russell Keaton (1939–1942), Gladys Parker (1942–1944), Marc Swayze (1944–1946)
- Current status/schedule: Daily and Sunday; concluded
- Launch date: October 2, 1939
- End date: July 20, 1946
- Syndicate(s): Bell Syndicate
- Publisher(s): Kitchen Sink Press (reprints)
- Genre(s): Adventure

Russell Keaton's Flyin' Jenny (July 6, 1941)

Flyin' Jenny was an aviation adventure comic strip created by illustrator Russell Keaton and distributed to newspapers by Bell Syndicate from October 2, 1939, to July 20, 1946.

== Publication history ==
Launched in October 1939, Flyin' Jenny was published both as a daily and Sunday strip, each running a separate storyline. Gladys Parker drew Flyin' Jenny from 1942 until 1944, when Keaton's assistant Marc Swayze took over.

After Keaton died in 1945 (at the age of 35), Swayze and scripter Glenn Chaffin made an effort to continue the strip, but it became difficult to devise adventures equal to those of the World War II years. The strip began to lose its popularity, and was discontinued in 1946.

== Characters and story ==
Initially a test pilot at the Starcraft Aviation Factory, Jenny encountered spies, saboteurs and criminals. Since the strip began simultaneously with the start of World War II, Jenny was active in wartime escapades.

Keaton's widow, Virginia Keaton Anderson, recalled how he devised the name of the central character. He originally planned to name the strip's heroine Virginia Dare. Delighted that he wanted to use her name, Virginia Keaton cautioned, "Russell, I'm not criticizing, but historians might. Remember, Virginia Dare was the name of the first child born of English parents in this country. Why don't you name her Virginia something else?" Keaton explained that he had specific reasons for choosing his character's last name as well as the first: "No, I want to name her Dare because I'm going to make her a daring young aviatrix." Then he had an idea: "Jenny is a nickname for Virginia. I'll name her Jenny Dare."

The Curtiss JN-4, known as "Jenny," was made by Curtiss in 1915, and it was filmed by Lee De Forest in Flying Jenny Airplane (1921), a short film with the sound of the aircraft.

== Reprints ==
Flyin' Jenny Sunday and daily strips were reprinted in The Aviation Art of Russell Keaton (Kitchen Sink Press, 1995), which also includes Keaton's correspondence with his collaborators and syndicate editors.
