= Benjamin Allen (cartoonist) =

American cartoonist (1903–1971)

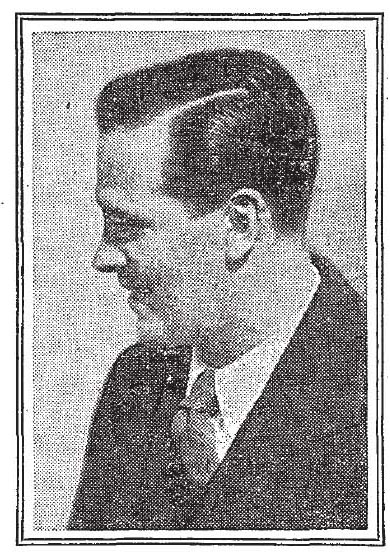
- Stookie Allen, cartoonist, in 1934
- Born: Benjamin David Allen; January 30, 1903 Corsicana, Texas, U.S.
- Died: January 6, 1971 (aged 67) Fort Worth, Texas, U.S.
- Areas: Cartoonist, Illustrator
- Pseudonym: "Stookie" Allen
- Notable works: fact-based comics
- Spouse: Gladys Parker (m. 1930; div. 1951)

Benjamin David "Stookie" Allen (30 January 1903 – 6 January 1971) was a cartoonist who specialized in nonfiction and inspirational features. He created the nationally syndicated comic strips Heroes of Democracy and Keen Teens. For the pulps, he created and drew Argosy magazine's Men of Daring and Women of Daring, and Detective Fiction Weekly's Illustrated Crimes.

== Life and career ==
Allen grew up in Corsicana, Texas, and attended the University of Texas. A local sports legend, in 1924 he caught the winning touchdown pass against Texas A&M University when a bobbled ball was tipped into his hands, leading the Longhorns to 7-0 victory against the Aggies in the brand new Memorial Stadium. In college, Allen also played baseball and the St. Louis Cardinals offered him a pitching tryout. He left Texas to study at the Art Institute of Chicago.

Allen moved around the southern oil fields for a while and ended up working for Standard Oil looking for marsh gas. When that job ended he was set to work on a pipeline in Natchez, Mississippi, and in 1927 was ready to take a job in Venezuela when he was offered a position drawing sports cartoons for the Associated Press in New York City.

Allen's comic strip Bug Movies was published in Dell Publishing's The Funnies, a seminal 1920s precursor of comic books. He also produced Bug Movies in the Funnies, a collection of the strip published in 1931.

While in New York, he met and married fellow cartoonist Gladys Parker in 1930. He assisted Parker with the comic strip Flapper Fanny during the 1930s while they lived in New York City.

The action-story pulp magazine Argosy began a weekly feature by Allen in about 1931 called Men of Daring, true stories in pictures. These one to two-page weekly picture stories contained the exploits of Americans, many relatively unknown, such as Canadian air ace Billy Bishop, infamous men like Edward Teach (a.k.a. Blackbeard), "as bold and cruel a rover as ever grasped hilt in hand". Allen often pictured celebrities such as Harry Houdini and the derring-do of international heroes like Alexander Sasha Siemel, Brazil's "Tiger Man". The art is strictly black-and-white, hand-lettered with depictions of landscapes, famous individuals, villains and mechanical inventions of the times. Men of Daring also appeared in the first two issues of the short-lived pulp magazine Red Star Adventures.

Argosy's weekly feature occasionally became Women of Daring, starring such notables as Dame Rachel Crowdy "the first woman in history to win knighthood in her own right" and the female bullfighter Conchita Cintron. Girls could also look up to Mary Wiggins, the Hollywood stunt girl and high diver.

Another pulp, Detective Fiction Weekly, contained Illustrated Crimes by Allen, a pictographic true crime feature published in the mid-1930s. They had titles like "The Clue of the Folded Dollar," a detailed account of the murder of Louise Gerrish, a school teacher, or "The Case of Lawyer Gibson," about a wealthy widow murdered for her estate by her attorney.

Allen also contributed the feature Above the Crowd to Famous Funnies from 1935 to 1943.

Allen and Parker moved to Los Angeles in 1937. When Allen moved to California, he drew a horse racing tip sheet comic called It's a Bet for the Los Angeles Herald-Express.

In 1940, Allen invested in a mica mine 90 miles north of Santa Fe, New Mexico, with the singer/band leader Smith Ballew.

A syndicated comic strip, Heroes of Democracy (King Features, March 9 – September 19, 1942), was devoted to the exploits of American heroes, such as "Wild Bill" Wellman of World War I.

When the U.S. entered World War II, Allen was drawing Heroes of Democracy and his patriotic cartoon motivated his decision to join the army. During World War II, Allen served as a major in the combat engineers in Europe. He was an art engineer, drawing battle bridges such as one built by the 238th Engineers, 1106th combat group, crossing the Seine River south of Paris to replace a destroyed railway bridge. He also drew floating Bailey bridges like the one erected in August 1944 (also spanning the Seine).

After World War II, Allen felt that too much attention was being paid to juvenile delinquents and decided to focus a pictorial column on teens doing positive things. He visited J. Edgar Hoover who thought it a good idea, so Allen created the syndicated feature Keen Teens. These black-and-white cartoons often contained photographs as part of the feature, such as the camera featured in Keen Teen Lens Lad-Paul Nielsen. Keen Teens was also known as Teen-Age Triumphs; one cartoon featured the young writer Sylvia Plath. To promote Keen Teens, Allen wrote 101 Ways to Make Money: Keen Teens (1955) which outlined how teens have "won fame, renown, and often small fortunes" by among other things, building collapsible boats, figurines and toys. "The perfect gift for the alert teen-ager."

=== Later life and death ===
Allen and Gladys Parker divorced in 1951. In his later life Allen worked as an art engineer for General Dynamics. By 1971 he had returned to his native Texas, where he died at age 67 in Fort Worth.

== Books ==
- Bug Movies in the Funnies (Dell Publishing, 1931)
- Men of Daring (Cupples and Leon Company, 1933)
- Fighting Heroes: Battle for Freedom (Whitman Publishing, 1942)
- 101 Ways to Make Money: Keen Teens (Emerson Books, 1955)
