= Gladys Parker =

American cartoonist (1908–1966)

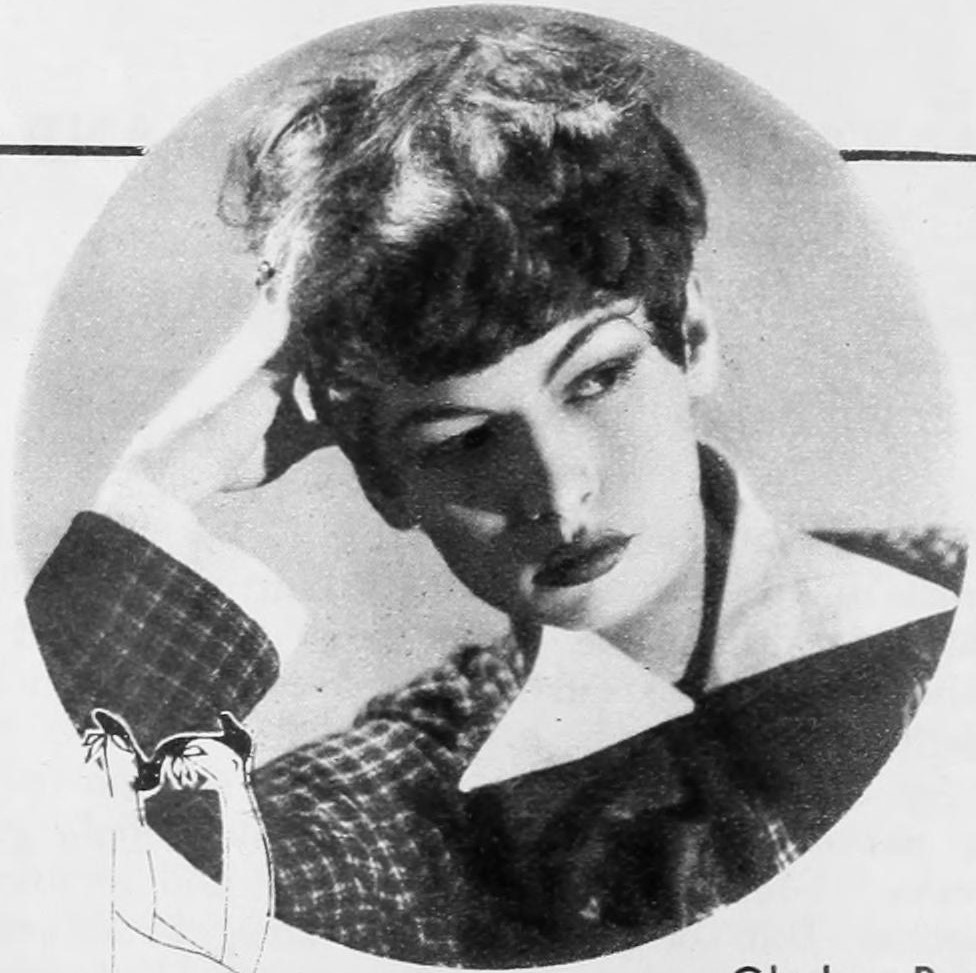
- Parker in 1934
- Born: March 21, 1908 Tonawanda, New York, U.S.
- Died: April 28, 1966 (aged 58) Los Angeles, California, U.S.
- Areas: Artist, fashion designer
- Notable works: Mopsy, Flapper Fanny Says, Betty G.I.
- Spouse: Benjamin "Stookie" Allen (m. 1930; div. 1951)

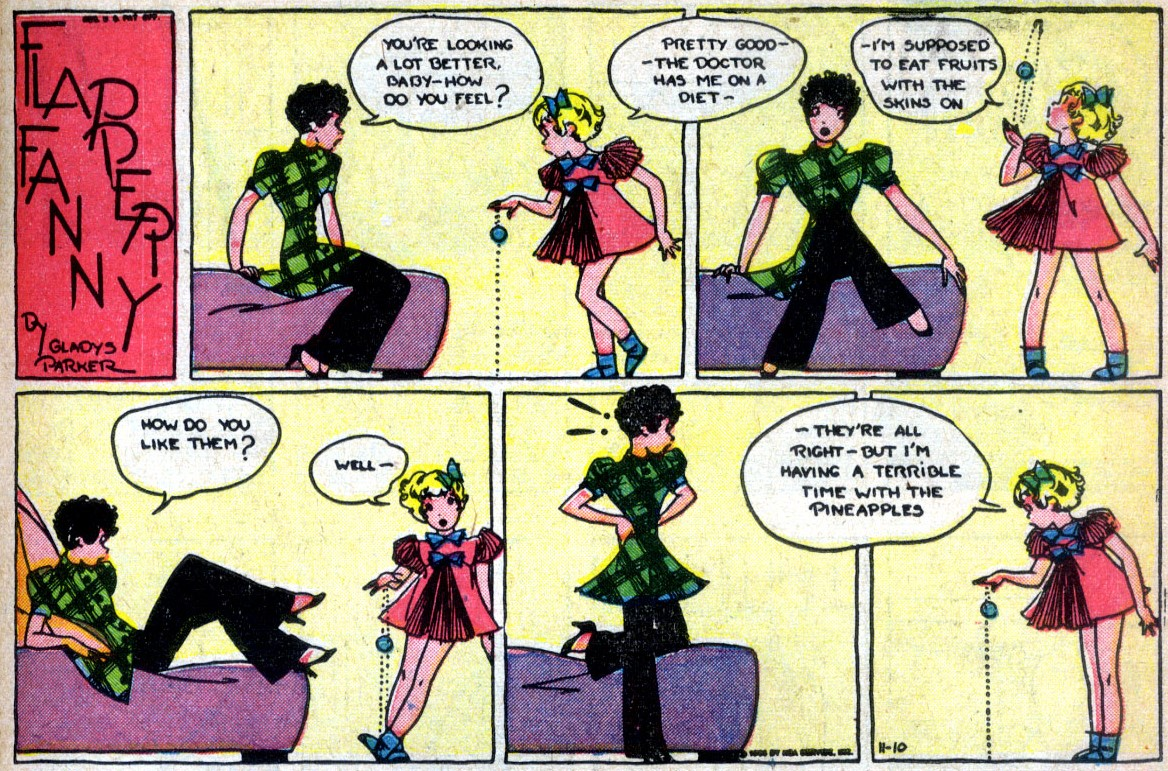
Flapper Fanny, reprinted in The Funnies, 1937

Gladys Parker (March 21, 1908 – April 28, 1966) was an American cartoonist for comic strips and a fashion designer in Hollywood. She is best known as the creator of the comic strip Mopsy (1939-1965), which had a long run over three decades. Parker was one of the few female cartoonists working between the 1930s and 1950s.

== Background ==
Gladys Parker was born in 1908 and grew up in Tonawanda, New York. She was the daughter of Caroline (née Gerster) and Wilbert C. Parker. She taught herself to draw while recuperating from a leg injury, often using herself as her model, and began selling cartoons to magazines. She also ran a dressmaking shop from home while still in high school. After graduating from Tonawanda High School, she worked in the office of a lumber yard.

At the age of 18, Parker arrived in Manhattan to study fashion illustration. Parker attended the Traphagen School of Fashion, graduating in 1928 in Illustration.

She started her newspaper career with the New York Graphic, doing a comic strip called May and Junie in 1928. She moved on to United Features for two years and Newspaper Enterprise Association for seven years. She was given the opportunity to draw for the comic strip Flapper Fanny, and later took over the publication entirely.

== Comic strips ==
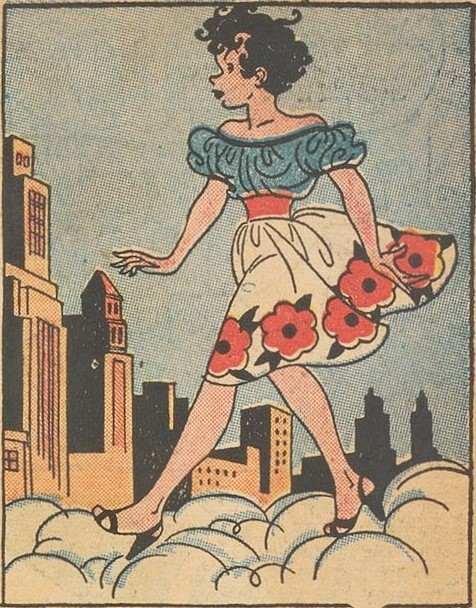
Her character, Mopsy, was modeled after herself.

After drawing the flapper strip Gay and Her Gang in 1928-29, she took over Ethel Hays' Flapper Fanny Says panel, which she did for NEA from 1930 to 1936. She also did a comic strip series for Lux Soap during the 1930s.Developing Mopsy in 1939, Parker modeled the character on herself. In 1946, she recalled, "I got the idea for Mopsy when the cartoonist Rube Goldberg said my hair looked like a mop. That was several years ago, and she has been my main interest ever since."

The Mopsy Sunday strip, added in 1945, gave Parker an opportunity to draw her fashion creations in a sidebar feature of paper dolls, titled "Mopsy Modes."

== WWII ==
During World War II, Parker created the strip Betty G.I. for the Women's Army Corps, and she also stepped in to draw Russell Keaton's Flyin' Jenny from 1942 until 1944 when his assistant Marc Swayze took over.

Mopsy held such wartime jobs as a nurse and a munitions-plant worker, and the feature grew in popularity. After World War II ended, Mopsy was fired from her defense job in 1947 and went back to civilian life.

== Licensing and reprints ==
Cover of St. John's Pageant of Comics #1

By the end of the 1940s, Mopsy was published in 300 newspapers. In 1947, Mopsy began in St. John Publications' Pageant of Comics #1. Two years later, St. John gave her a title of her own, and Mopsy ran for 19 issues (February 1949 to September 1953). Charlton Comics reprinted several of those comic books in 1951. In 1955, Berkley Books published a Mopsy paperback collection. St. John also ran Mopsy as filler pages in its romance comics.

== Clothing designs ==
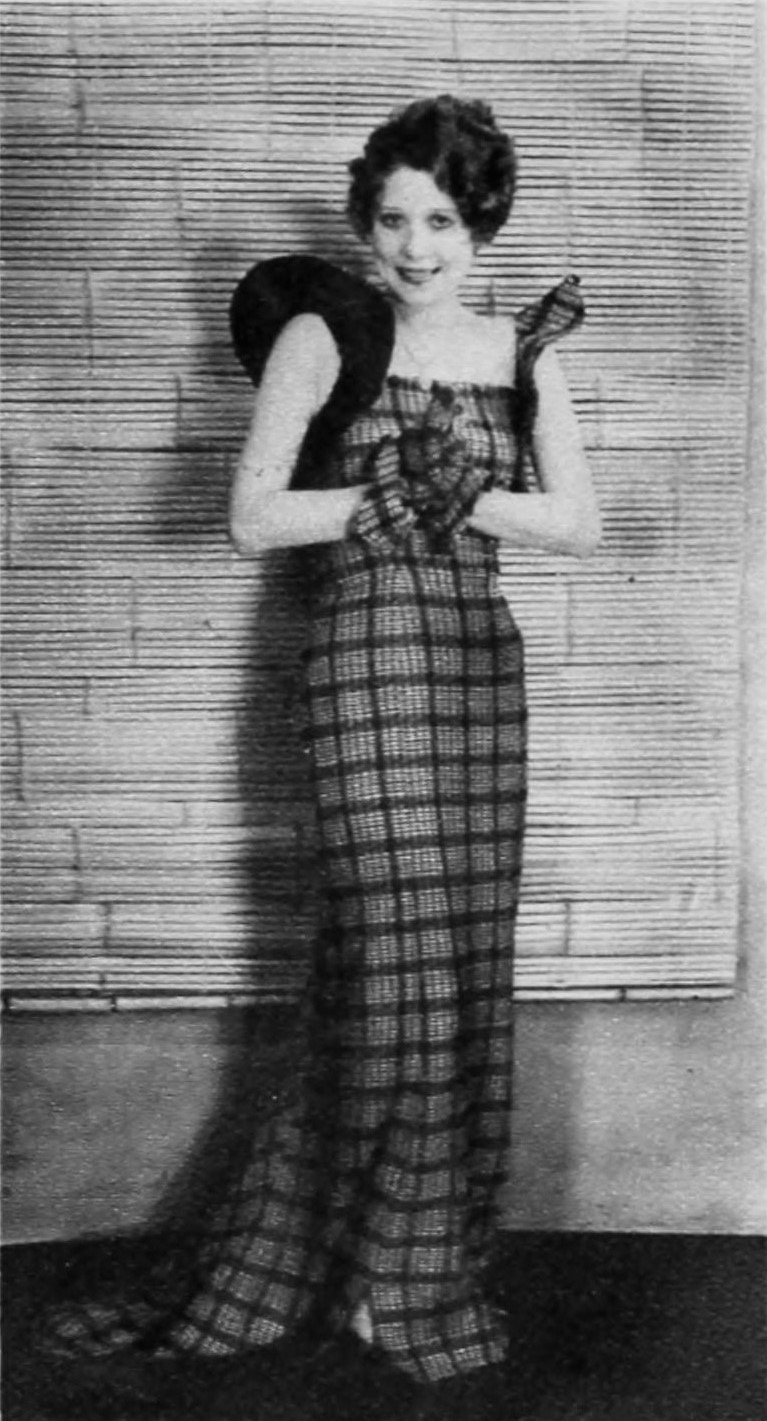
Annette Hanshaw models a dress designed by Parker, 1934

Under the name Gladys Parker Designs, her clothing line was sold in stores as early as 1934, capitalizing on her fame as the artist of Flapper Fanny Says. Parker also designed for films, such as her 1940 white sharkskin suit worn by actress Louise Platt. Living in Hollywood with her two black cats, Parker also wrote a daily column, "Dear Gals and Guys", during the 1960s.

== Personal life ==
On May 9, 1930, Parker was married to illustrator Benjamin "Stookie" Allen, who drew for pulp magazines and comic books. They divorced in 1951.

Parker was a member of the Society of Illustrators and the National Cartoonists Society. When she retired in 1965, Mopsy retired with her. She was just 58 when she died of lung cancer in 1966.

== See also ==
- Edwina Dumm
- Marty Links
- Dale Messick
- Hilda Terry
