= Pop Momand =

American cartoonist

- Born: Arthur Ragland Momand; May 15, 1887 San Diego, California, U.S.
- Died: November 10, 1987 (aged 100) Cambridge, New York, U.S.
- Area: Cartoonist
- Notable works: Keeping Up with the Joneses
- Spouses: May Harding; Mayo Deason

Arthur Ragland "Pop" Momand (May 15, 1887 – November 10, 1987) was an American cartoonist best known for his comic strip Keeping Up with the Joneses.

== Biography ==
Momand spent his childhood in New York City, where he attended the Trinity School.

In 1905 or 1907, Harry Grant Dart hired Momand as a staff artist for the New York World, where he produced a variety of comic strips including Mr. I. N. Dutch. He also worked at The Evening Telegram, where he created the comic strip Pazaza. After this, he spent a year studying art at the Académie Julian.

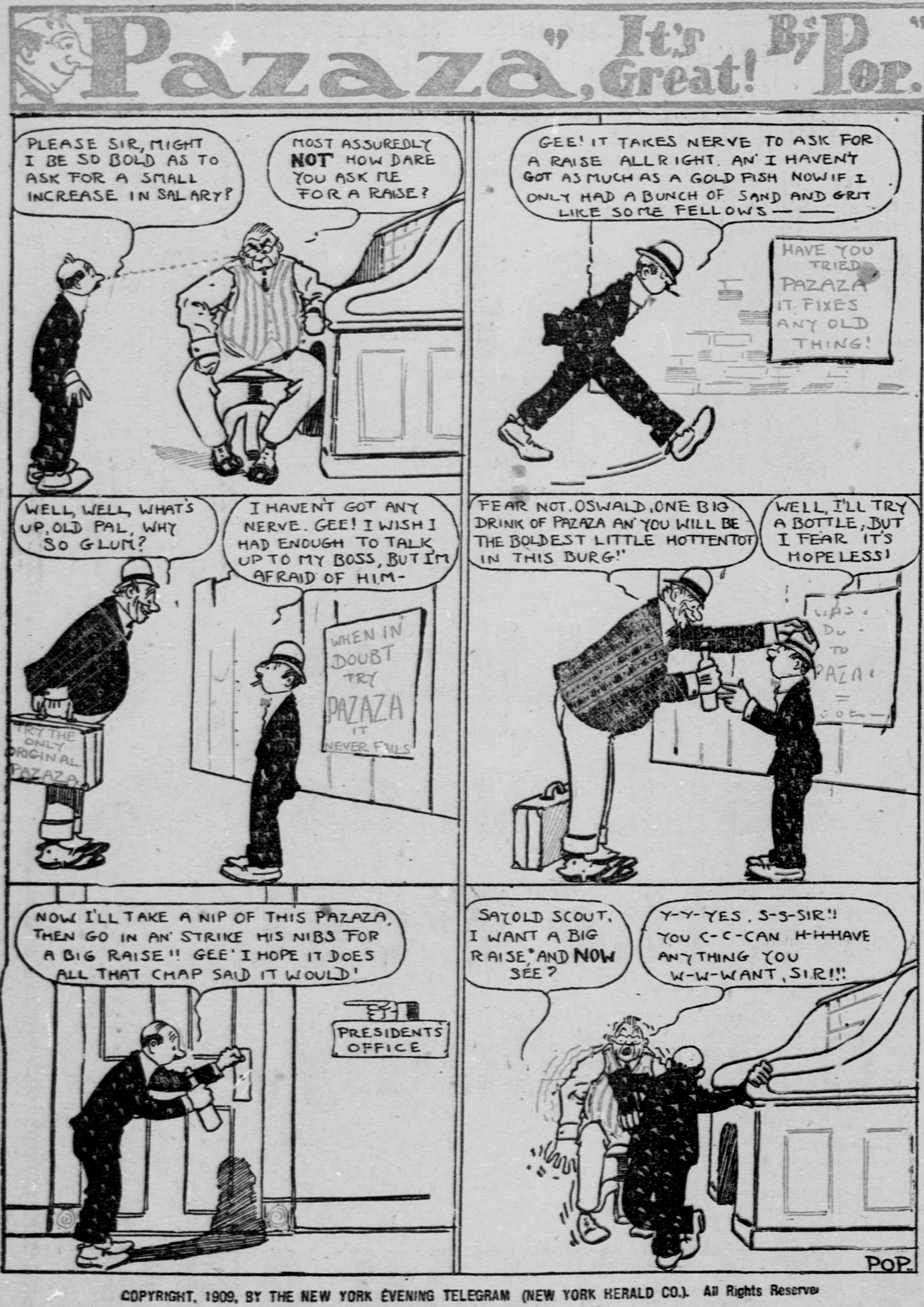
Momand's comic strip "Pazaza", January 3, 1910

In 1913, he created Keeping Up with the Joneses, based on his Nassau County experiences. The strip appeared in early issues of both Funnies on Parade and Famous Funnies; and was syndicated until 1938. After retiring from cartooning, Momand became a portrait painter.

== Personal life ==
In 1910, he was married to May Harding, and lived in Nassau County, New York (either Cedarhurst or Hempstead). Unable to afford the Nassau County lifestyle, they eventually moved back to Manhattan. Momand and Harding subsequently divorced, and in 1928 he married Mayo Deason in Lucerne, Switzerland. By 1931, he was living in Paris.
