= List of game designers =

A game designer is a person who invents games at the conceptual level. Outstanding board game designers are recognized annually by awards such as the Spiel des Jahres and the As d'Or. The Academy of Adventure Gaming Arts & Design, a division of the Game Manufacturers Association, inducts outstanding individuals into the Hall of Fame.

== Crossword designers ==
Crossword designers are also known as crossword compilers, cruciverbalists, crossword writers, crossword constructors, or crossword setters.

== Paper-and-pencil game designers ==
The following game designers work on paper-and-pencil games other than crosswords. These games can be played solely with paper and pencils (or other writing implements), usually without erasing.

Designer	Notable work	Honors	Ref.
Richard Bartle	Spellbinder		
John Horton Conway	Sprouts, Hackenbush, and Conway's Game of Life		
Howard Garns	designer of the modern Sudoku puzzle		
Wayne Gould	author of a computer program for producing, rating and solving Sudoku puzzles		
Piet Hein	Hex (aka Polygon)		
David L. Hoyt	designer of Jumble word puzzles for Tribune Content Agency		
Shing Yin Khor	Field Guide to Memory	IndieCade Award	
Jeff Knurek	designer of Jumble word puzzles for Tribune Content Agency		
László Kozma	Obstruction		
Édouard Lucas	Dots and boxes (la pipopipette)		
Tetsuya Miyamoto	KenKen		
Pedro Ocón de Oro	creator of word search puzzles, hieroglyph puzzles for ABC and Blanco y Negro, and developer of the transfusion of letters in puzzles, often using the pseudonym Ocón de Oro		
Mike Paterson	Sprouts		
Roger Price	Mad Libs		
Sid Sackson	Patterns II	Hall of Fame	
Claude Shannon	Shannon switching game		
Jeeyon Shim	Field Guide to Memory	Diana Jones Emerging Designer	
Jeeyon Shim	Field Guide to Memory	IndieCade Award	
Will Shortz	developed the current form of Ditloid		
Leonard Stern	Mad Libs		

== Pinball game designers ==
Outstanding pinball game designers are recognized by the Pinball Expo Hall of Fame. Some notable players include George Gomez, Pat Lawlor, and Steve Ritchie.

== Video game designers ==
Some of the most infuencial video game designers are discussed in a books series by Bloomsbury Publishing including Todd Howard, Keiji Inafune, Eugene Jarvis, Jane Jensen, Hideo Kojima, Brenda Laurel, and Shigeru Miyamoto. Ralph H. Baer is notable as an invotor of video games, designing the Magnavox Odyssey home video game system.

== See also ==
- Going Cardboard
- History of games
- List of indie game developers
