= Tribune Content Agency =

American syndication company owned by Tribune Publishing

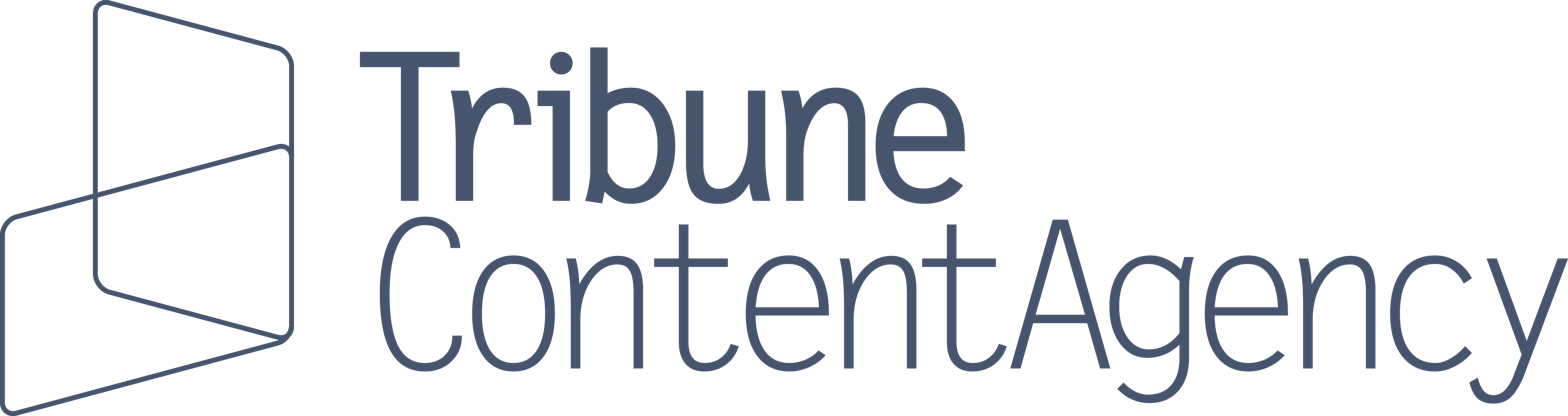
- Formerly: Chicago Tribune Syndicate (1918–1933); Chicago Tribune-Daily News Syndicate, Inc.; Tribune-New York (Daily) News Syndicate; Chicago Tribune New York News Syndicate; Tribune Company Syndicate; Tribune Media Services
- Type: Syndication
- Industry: Media
- Founded: 1918; 108 years ago
- Founder: Joseph Medill Patterson
- Headquarters: Chicago, United States
- Area served: United States
- Parent: Tribune Publishing
- Website: tribunecontentagency.com

Tribune Content Agency (TCA) is a syndication company owned by Tribune Publishing. TCA had previously been known as the Chicago Tribune Syndicate, the Chicago Tribune New York News Syndicate (CTNYNS), Tribune Company Syndicate, and Tribune Media Services. TCA is headquartered in Chicago, and had offices in various American cities (Milwaukee, Wisconsin; Queensbury, New York; Arlington, Texas; Santa Monica, California), the United Kingdom, the Netherlands, and Hong Kong.

== History ==
=== Chicago Tribune Syndicate (1918–2000) ===
Sidney Smith's early comic strip The Gumps had a key role in the rise of syndication when Robert R. McCormick and Joseph Medill Patterson, who had both been publishing the Chicago Tribune since 1914, planned to launch a tabloid in New York, as comics historian Coulton Waugh explained:

So originated on June 16, 1919, the Illustrated Daily News, a title which, as too English, was almost at once clipped to (New York) Daily News. It was a picture paper, and it was a perfect setting for the newly developed art of the comic strip. The first issue shows but a single strip, The Gumps. It was the almost instant popularity of this famous strip that directly brought national syndication into being. Midwestern and other papers began writing to the Chicago Tribune, which also published The Gumps, requesting to be allowed to use the new comic, and the result was that the heads of the two papers collaborated and founded the . . . syndicate, which soon was distributing Tribune-News features to every nook and cranny of the country.

Patterson founded the Chicago Tribune Syndicate in 1918, managed by Arthur Crawford.

In 1933, Patterson (who was then based in New York and running the Daily News), launched the Chicago Tribune-Daily News Syndicate, Inc. (also known as the Chicago Tribune-New York News Syndicate and the Tribune-New York (Daily) News Syndicate).

An April 1933 article in Fortune described the "Big Four" American syndicates as United Feature Syndicate, King Features Syndicate, the Chicago Tribune Syndicate, and the Bell-McClure Syndicate. Mollie Slott kept the syndicate running in its mid-century glory days.

In 1968, the syndicate offered about 150 features to approximately 1400 client newspapers.

=== Tribune Media Services (2000–2013) ===
Tribune Publishing acquired the Times Mirror Company in 2000, with the Los Angeles Times Syndicate being merged into Tribune Media Services.

In 2006 The McClatchy Company inherited a partnership with the Tribune Company, in the news service Knight Ridder-Tribune Information Services, when it acquired Knight Ridder; the new service was called the McClatchy-Tribune News Service (MCT). In 2014, Tribune bought out McClatchy's share of the company, taking full ownership of MCT and moving its headquarters to Chicago.

=== Tribune Content Agency (2013-present) ===
On June 25, 2013, the newspaper syndication News & Features division of Tribune Media Services became the Tribune Content Agency.

On June 12, 2014, Tribune Media Services was merged into Gracenote. After the 2014 split of Tribune Company assets between Tribune Media and Tribune Publishing, Gracenote went to Tribune Media (who would sell it to Nielsen Holdings in 2016) while Tribune Content Agency content remained with Tribune Publishing.

On September 22, 2014, the McClatchy-Tribune News Service (MCT) was renamed the Tribune News Service (TNS).

== Products and services ==
TCA distributes media products, such as news, columns, comic strips, Jumble and crosswords, printed insert books, video, and other information services to publications across the United States, Canada, and other countries in English and Spanish for both print and web syndication.

Tribune Premium Content is a subscription service for newspapers and other media channels. The content provided includes comics, puzzles, games, editorial cartoons, as well as feature content packages. Tribune Premium Content also syndicates content from other sources, such as The Atlantic, Kiplinger, Harvard Health and Mayo Clinic.

TCA's news service, Tribune News Service, offers breaking news, lifestyle and entertainment stories, sports and business articles, commentary, photos, graphics and illustrations.

Tribune SmartContent is an information service filtered to provide targeted content. Full-text news feeds deliver articles from 600 sources from around the world.

TCA also offered products and services for niche markets via TCA Specialty Products.

TCA has, worldwide, 600-plus contributors and serves more than 1,200 clients, services and resellers.

== Management ==
- Wayne Lown, General Manager
- Rick DeChantal, Sales Director
- Pia Ingberg, Director, European Operations
- Mustafa Sharaan, Director of International Business Development
- Jack Barry, VP/Operations (and Acquisitions Editor)
- Zach Finken, Associate Editor
- Matt Maldre, Marketing Manager

== Comic strips ==
=== Strips as of 2026 ===
- 9 to 5
- Alvin by Alvin Wellington
- Animal Crackers
- Barney & Clyde
- Bliss by Harry Bliss
- Bottom Liners
- Bound and Gagged
- Brewster Rockit: Space Guy!
- Broom-Hilda
- Dick Tracy
- Gasoline Alley
- Gil Thorp
- Love Is...
- The Middletons
- Reply All
- Pluggers

=== Discontinued strips ===
- The Adventures of Smilin' Jack by Zack Mosley (1933–1973)
- Aggie Mack / Aggie by Hal Rasmusson and Roy L. Fox (1946–1972)
- Beyond Mars by Jack Williamson & Lee Elias (February 17, 1952 – May 13, 1955)
- Bobby Make-Believe by Frank King (1915–1919)
- Brenda Starr, Reporter originally by Dale Messick (1940–2011)
- Ching Chow originally by Sidney Smith and Stanley Link (1927–1990)
- Closer Than We Think by Arthur Radebaugh (January 12, 1958 – January 6, 1963) — Sunday panel
- Compu-toon by Charles Boyce (1994–1997; moved to Universal Uclick)
- Conrad by Bill Schorr (1982–1986)
- Deathless Deer by Alicia Patterson and Neysa McMein (1942–1943)
- Dondi by Gus Edson and Irwin Hasen (1955–1986)
- Friday Foster by Jim Lawrence and later Jorge Longarón (1970–1974)
- The Gumps by Sidney Smith (1917–1959)
- Harold Teen by Carl Ed (1919–1959)
- Helen, Sweetheart of the Internet by Peter Zale (5 June 2000 – 25 December 2005)
- Housebroken (2002–2010)
- In the Bleachers by Steve Moore (1985–1995; moved to Universal Press Syndicate)
- Kennesaw by Reamer Keller (1953–1955)
- Li'l Abner by Al Capp (1964–1977) — moved over from United Feature Syndicate
- Little Joe originally by Ed Leffingwell (October 1, 1933–1972)
- Little Lulu (June 5, 1950 – May 1969) by Woody Kimbrell (1950–1964), Roger Armstrong (1964–1966), and Ed Nofziger (1966–1969)
- Little Orphan Annie by Harold Gray and others (1924–2010)
- Lola by Todd Clark (1999–2005; moved to United Feature Syndicate)
- Lolly (later changed to Lolly and Pepper) by Pete Hansen (1955–1983)
- Loose Parts, originally by Dave Blazek and John Gilpin (December 2000–September 24, 2014; moved to The Washington Post Writers Group) — acquired from the Los Angeles Times Syndicate
- Louie by Harry Hanan (1947–1976)
- Mary Perkins, On Stage by Leonard Starr (February 1957 – September 9, 1979)
- Moon Mullins by Frank Willard & Ferd Johnson (1923–1991)
- Mother Goose and Grimm by Mike Peters (1984–2002; moved to King Features Syndicate)
- Motley's Crew by Ben Templeton and Tom Forman (1976–2000)
- Mount Pleasant by Rick McKee and Kent Sligh (2021-2023)
- My Son John by Bill Hoest (April 4 1960 – c. April 1962)
- The Neighbors by George Clark (1939–1971)
- Old Doc Yak by Sidney Smith (February 5, 1912 – June 22, 1919, December 7, 1930 – February 25, 1934) — second iteration as a weekly topper strip for The Gumps
- The Pink Panther by Eric and Bill Teitelbaum (2004-2009)
- Raising Hector by Peter Ramirez (2006-2010)
- Rick O'Shay by Stan Lynde (April 27, 1958 – March 8, 1981)
- Shoe by Jeff MacNelly and then others (1977–2008; moved to King Features Syndicate)
- Smitty by Walter Berndt (1922–1973)
- Smokey Stover by Bill Holman (1935–1973)
- Spy vs. Spy by Duck Edwing and Dave Manak (2002–2014)
- Sylvia (1981–2012)
- Tales of the Green Beret by Robin Moore & Joe Kubert (September 20, 1965 – 1968)
- The Teenie Weenies by William Donahey (June 14, 1914 – October 26, 1924; September 24, 1933 – December 2, 1934; May 18, 1941 – February 15, 1970)
- Terry and the Pirates (1934–1973) by Milton Caniff (1934–1946) and George Wunder (1946–1973)
- Texas Slim by Ferd Johnson (1925–1958)
- Tiny Tim by Stanley Link (July 23, 1933 – March 2, 1958)
- Whiteboy (later changed to Whiteboy in Skull Valley and then simply Skull Valley) by Garrett Price (Oct. 8, 1933–Aug. 16, 1936)
- Winnie Winkle (1920–1996) by Martin Branner (1920–1962), Max Van Bibber (1962–1980), and Frank Bolle (1980–1996)
- The World's Greatest Superheroes by numerous creators (1978–1985)

== Editorial cartoons ==
- Nick Anderson
- Clay Bennett
- Lisa Benson
- Bill Bramhall
- Tim Campbell
- Jeff Danziger
- Phil Hands
- David Horsey
- Pedro Molina
- Jack Ohman
- Joel Pett
- Drew Sheneman
- Scott Stantis
- Joey Weatherford

== Columns and articles ==
=== Advice ===
- God Squad, The by Marc Gellman
- Harvard Health Letters
- Interpersonal Edge by Daneen Skube
- Mayo Clinic Q & A
- Medicine Cabinet, The: Ask the Harvard Experts
- My Answer from the writings of the Rev. Billy Graham
- My Pet World by Cathy M. Rosenthal
- Problem Solved by Christopher Elliott

=== Business & Personal Finance ===
- Careers Now by Vicki Salemi
- Interpersonal Edge by Daneen Skube
- Jill on Money by Jill Schlesinger
- Kids & Money by Steve Rosen
- Kiplinger Consumer News Service
- Kiplinger's Money Power
- Markets & Mutual Funds
- Money Market Package
- Savings Game, The by Elliot Raphaelson
- Success featuring Kiplinger, Inc. Magazine and Fast Company
- Terry Savage

=== Entertainment ===
==== Card games ====
- Daily Bridge Club by Frank Stewart
- Goren Bridge by Bob Jones
- Poker by Tony Dunst and Bryan Devonshire

==== Humor ====
- Dave Barry Year in Review by Dave Barry
- Humor Hotel by Greg Schwem
- Today’s Chuckle by Harlan Collins

==== Pop culture ====
- Bang Showbiz
- Cover Media
- Film Clips by The Chicago Tribune
- Nielsen SoundScan
- Video Games by GamerHub.TV

==== Sports ====
- Latest Line by J. McCarthy

=== Food ===
- Entrée Feature Package featuring Environmental Nutrition, Eating Well, The Kitchn and Seriously Simple

=== Health ===
- Environmental Nutrition
- Harvard Health Letters
- How to Keep Well by Irving S. Cutter (1935–?)
- Mayo Clinic Q & A
- Medicine Cabinet, The: Ask the Harvard Experts
- Premium Health News Service by Various Contributors

=== Home ===
- Ask the Builder by Tim Carter
- Do It Yourself…Or Not? by Gene and Katie Hamilton
- Living Space by Better Homes & Gardens, Real Simple, Parents magazine, Midwest Living, and Southern Living
- Problem Solved by Christopher Elliott

=== Lifestyle ===
- Drive, The
- Fresh Toast, The
- My Pet World by Cathy M. Rosenthal
- Tuesdays with Mitch by Mitch Albom
- Your Daily Astrology by Magi Helena

=== Magazines ===
- Atlantic, The
- Cut, The
- Defense One
- Fast Company
- Foreign Affairs
- Harvard Health Letters
- Inc. Magazine
- MIT Sloan Management Review & Report
- MIT Technology Review
- New Scientist
- New York Magazine
- Psychology Today
- Quartz
- Vulture

=== Opinion ===
- Bill Press
- Cal Thomas
- Clarence Page
- David Horsey
- Diplomat, The
- Gary Franks
- Global Viewpoint Network by Nathan Gardels
- Jonah Goldberg
- Mary Sanchez
- Oppenheimer Report, The by Andrés Oppenheimer
- Rachel Marsden
- Robert Reich
- S. E. Cupp
- Victor Davis Hanson

=== Travel ===
- Celebrity Travel by Jae-Ha Kim
- Rick Steves’ Europe by Rick Steves
- Taking the Kids by Eileen Ogintz

=== World News ===
- Atlantic, The
- Defense One
- Deutsche Welle
- Foreign Affairs

== Discontinued columns and columnists ==
- Nancy Dorris: cooking (1930s)
- W. A. Evans, M.D.: health column (1919–1933)
- Little Old New York, by Ed Sullivan (1935–1940s)
- Danton Walker, column on Broadway theatre (1939–1940s)
- Clare Boothe Luce: national political convention coverage) (1940s)
- Beauty Answers by Antoinette Donnelly (1919–c. 1946)
- Doris Blake: Love Problems, Heart Chats, and Heart to Heart Talks (1921–1946)
- Mainly About Manhattan by John Chapman (1933–1946)
- Parent-Child by Gladys Bevans (1927—c. 1946)
- Rush & Malloy by George Rush and Joanna Molloy (?–2009)
- Inside the Video Games (?–2009)
- Samantha Power (?–2009)
- Paul A. Samuelson (?–2010)
- Test Drive by Jim Mateja (?–2010)
- Joe Galloway (?–2010)
- Eric Heiden (2009-2011)
- Kathy Kristof (?–2011)
- Swift Justice by Nancy Grace (2010-2011)
- Michael Showalter (?–2011)
- Naturally Savvy (?–2011)
- Jen Lancaster (2011)
- Social Studies by Julia Allison (2010-2011)
- Garrison Keillor (?–2012)
- Robyn Blumner (?–2013)
- Alexander Heffner (?–2013)
- Ta-Nehisi Coates (?–2013)
- Retire Smart (?–2014)
- Joel Brinkley (2014)
- Travel Troubleshooter by Christopher Elliott (?–2014)
- Andy Rooney (?–2014)
- Brazen Careerist by Penelope Trunk (2006–2014)
- William Pfaff (?–2015)
- a Google a Day (2011-2015)
- Jean Knows Cars by Jean Jennings (2015–2016)
- Steve Dale (?–2016)
- Kristyn Schiavone (2011-2016)
- So Social by Scott Kleinberg (?–2016)
- Apps of the Week (?–2016)
- Diane Farr (?–2016)
- Your Other 8 Hours by Robert Pagliarini (?–2016)
- Virtual Tourist (?–2016)
- Cultivating Life (?–2016)
- Ian Bremmer (?–2017)
- Frank Rich (?–2017)
- Global Events in Context by David Keys (?–2017)
- Liz Smith (?–2017)
- Mario Batali (2011–2017)
- Kids Doctor by Sue Hubbard, M.D. (?–2018)
- Anya Kamenetz (?–2018)
- One for the Table (?–2018)
- Paul Greenberg (?–2018)
- The Smart Collector by Danielle Arnet (?–2019)
- Global Economic Viewpoint by Nathan Gardels (?–2019)
- Henry Kissinger (?–2020)
- Paul Kennedy (?–2020)
- Simple Style by Aramide Esubi (?–2020)
- Wolfgang Puck's Kitchen by Wolfgang Puck (?–2020)
- Carl Hiaasen (?–2021)
- Scopin the Soaps by Toby Goldstein (?–2021)
- John Kass (?–2021)
- Mary Schmich (?–2021)
- Rex Huppke (?–2022)
- Politics Today by Jules Witcover (?–2022)
- Leonard Pitts Jr. (?–2022)
- Daily Racing Form’s Consensus (?-2023)
- Ask Amy by Amy Dickinson (2003-2024)
- Ana Veciana-Suarez (?-2025)
- Ed Perkins on Travel (?-2025)

== Games and puzzles ==
=== Crosswords ===
- Daily Commuter Puzzle, The by Stella Zawistowski
- Jumble Crosswords by David L. Hoyt
- Los Angeles Times Crossword Puzzle edited by Patti Varol
- Quote-Acrostic
- TV Crossword, The by Ricky Cruz

=== Jumble games ===
- Jumble by David L. Hoyt and Jeff Knurek
- Jumble Crosswords by David L. Hoyt
- Jumble for Kids by David L. Hoyt and Jeff Knurek
- TV Jumble by David L. Hoyt

=== Logic puzzles ===
- Futoshiki / More or Less
- Hitori
- Junior Mind Gym
- Kakuro by Michael Mepham
- Killer Sudoku
- Killer Sudoku Pro
- Kubok
- Mind Gym
- Samurai Sudoku
- Sudoku Daily by Michael Mepham

=== Visual puzzles ===
- Spot the Difference

=== Word puzzles ===
- ArrowWords
- Boggle BrainBusters by David L. Hoyt and Jeff Knurek
- Code-Cracker
- SCRABBLEgrams
- Word Salsa by Tony Tallarico
- Word Wheel

== Premium editions ==
- Brainbusters: The Ultimate Puzzle Book
- Envelope’s Oscar Preview, The
- Family Health Guide from Harvard Health Publications
- Guide to Entertaining: Be the Best Holiday Host This Year
- Guide to Fitness from Harvard Health Publications
- Guide to Investment from Morningstar
- Guide to Retirement from Morningstar
- Guide to Summer Entertaining
- International Travel Guide
- Life Skills: How to do almost anything
- Mayo Clinic Guide to Healthy Eating
- Pet Power
- Travel Guide U.S.A.

== See also ==
- List of newspaper comic strips
