= Deaths in May 1981 =

The following is a list of notable deaths in May 1981.

Entries for each day are listed alphabetically by surname. A typical entry lists information in the following sequence:

- Name, age, country of citizenship at birth, subsequent country of citizenship (if applicable), reason for notability, cause of death (if known), and reference.

== May 1981 ==
=== 1 ===
- Heinosuke Gosho, 79, Japanese film director and screenwriter, his work oscillated between comedy and drama, sometimes mixing the two, which earned his films the reputation of making the viewer "laugh and cry at the same time", he was one of the first film directors to adapt the works of the junbungaku ("pure literature") movement for the screen, which opposed popular literature in favour of serious literature and a more complex handling of its subjects.
- Barry Jones, 88, Guernsey-born British actor, he was a war veteran of World War I, having served in with both the Royal Guernsey Light Infantry and the Royal Irish Fusiliers until the end of his military service in February 1921, primarily known for touring Canada and the United States during the interwar period, with a repertory mostly consisting of plays by George Bernard Shaw
- Marlin Skiles, 74, American film composer, he signed a contract with Republic Pictures in 1943, but he also worked for Columbia Pictures during the 1940s, he was the music director for the Western television series Death Valley Days (1952 –1970),cancer

=== 3 ===
- Nargis, 51, Indian actress and politician, she won the Filmfare Award for Best Actress for her role in the epic drama Mother India (1957), she served as a Member of Parliament, Rajya Sabha from 1980 until her death in 1981,pancreatic cancer

=== 5 ===
- Bobby Sands, 27, Irish paramilitary member, he joined the Provisional Irish Republican Army (IRA) in 1971,he was one of the orchestrators of the 1976 Balmoral Furniture Company bombing, he was sentenced to 14 years of imprisonment for possession of a revolver in 1977, but he was never charged with explosive offences, while still imprisoned in April 1981, Sands was elected as a Member of Parliament (MP) for Fermanagh and South Tyrone, nominated on the label "Anti H-Block/Armagh Political Prisoner", Sands became the youngest MP at the time, death by self-starvation while taking part in the 1981 Irish hunger strike

=== 6 ===
- Frank Fitzsimmons, 73, American labor leader.
- Frank O'Grady, 80, senior Australia public servant, he was appointed Director-General of Posts and Telegraphs, heading the Postmaster-General's Department, in September 1961.

=== 8 ===
- Uri Zvi Greenberg, 84, Austrian-born Israeli poet, journalist and politician, following the Israeli independence in 1948, Greenberg joined Menachem Begin's Herut movement, he was elected to the first Knesset, but he lost his seat in the 1951 Israeli legislative election, after the Six-Day War (1967), he joined the ultranationalist political organisation Movement for Greater Israel, which advocated Israeli sovereignty over the West Bank, and subscribed to an ideology of Greater Israel, the scholar Dan Tamir considers Greenberg's ideology among the most prominent historical examples of Hebrew fascism.
- Prince Andrei Alexandrovich of Russia, 84, Russian exiled nobleman, he was a member of the Holstein-Gottorp-Romanov and a nephew of Nicholas II of Russia, he was an artist and had several exhibitions of his works in Paris before World War II, he designed the cover of Let's Light the Candles, a memoir written by his mother-in-law, over the years he came to enjoy his role as an English country squire, opening church fetes and sporting charitable causes, particularly in the English village where he lived.

=== 9 ===
- Nelson Algren, 72, American novelist, he was a romantic partner of his fellow writer Simone de Beauvoir, his novel The Man with the Golden Arm (1949) won the National Book Award for Fiction in 1950, his works depicted the world of "drunks, pimps, prostitutes, freaks, drug addicts, prize fighters, corrupt politicians, and hoodlums",heart attack
- Margaret Lindsay, 70, American actress, her roles in the 1940s included a "striking" performance in The House of the Seven Gables (1940), an appearance in the first entry of the Crime Doctor (1943), and her recurring role as Nikki Porter (Queen's secretary and love interest) in the film series Ellery Queen (1940–1942), Lindsay was reportedly the life partner of her fellow actress Mary McCarty and was also a romantic partner for Janet Gaynor,emphysema
- Rolf Just Nilsen, 49, Norwegian singer, impressionist and actor, he was particularly known for his imitations of famous comedians

=== 11 ===
- Hoyt W. Fuller, 57, American journalist, editor, educator, critic, and author during the Black Arts Movement, in 1961, he became the new editor of The Negro Digest, resurrecting the publication after a 10 year hiatus,heart attack
- Odd Hassel, 83, Norwegian physical chemist, he was a Nobel laureate in Chemistry for his contributions to the development of the concept of conformation
- Bob Marley, 36, Jamaican singer, songwriter, and guitarist, he was a longtime member of the Rastafari movement, whose culture was a key element in the development of reggae, he became an ardent proponent of Rastafari, taking its music out of the socially-deprived areas of Jamaica and onto the international music scene, he was a pan-Africanist and believed in the unity of African people worldwide, many of his songs had anti-imperialist and pan-Africanist themes, death due to acral lentiginous melanoma, the most common melanoma in people with dark skin, by the time of his death, the cancer had also spread to his lungs and brain.

=== 12 ===
- Henry Formhals, 72, American cartoonist, he continued Freckles and His Friends, and served as an assistant on Ella Cinders and Joe Jinks
- Francis Hughes, 25, Irish paramilitary member, he briefly joined the Official Irish Republican Armyin 1972, and then joined the Provisional Irish Republican Army's South Derry Brigade in 1973, he was arrested in March 1978, after an exchange of gunfire with the British Army in 1980, he was tried for, and found guilty of, the murder of one British Army soldier, for the wounding of another soldier in the incident which led to his arrest, as well as a series of gun and bomb attacks over a six-year period, he starved himself to death while taking part in the 1981 Irish hunger strike. His death led to a surge in rioting in nationalist areas of Northern Ireland.
- Benjamin Sheares, 73, Singaporean obstetrician, gynaecologist, academic, and politician, he served as the president of Singapore from 1971 until his death in 1981, his contributions to obstetrics include the lower Caesarian section, which he standardised, that resulted in a lower mortality and morbidity rate in pregnant women than the upper Caesarian section, death after spending several days in a coma, due to developing a cerebral haemorrhage

=== 13 ===
- Joan Weber, 45, American popular music singer, her song Let Me Go, Lover! (1954) was performed on the television show, Studio One and caught the public's fancy, reaching No. 1 in the United States and No. 16 in the United Kingdom in 1955, the song sold over one million copies, and was awarded a gold disc, after her early retirement from her singing career, Weber seemingly disappeared, by 1969, Columbia Records had lost track of her whereabouts: royalty checks mailed to her last known address were returned as undeliverable, the chart program American Top 40 ranked Weber at number one on a special program featuring the "Top 40 Disappearing Acts", which was broadcast in 1975,heart failure

=== 16 ===
- Ezra Dotan, 43, Israeli fighter ace, he was credited with five aerial victories, during the early 1970s, he helped to develop unmanned aerial vehicles (UAV) within the Israeli Air Force (IAF)
- Ernie Freeman, 58, American pianist, organist, bandleader, and arranger, he won the Grammy Award for Best Arrangement Accompanying a Vocalist or Instrumentalist for his arrangements of Frank Sinatra's Strangers in the Night (1966) and Simon & Garfunkel's Bridge over Troubled Water (1970),heart attack

=== 17 ===
- Hugo Friedhofer, 80, American film composer and cellist, he started his Hollywood career in 1929 as a musician for Fox Film, and later served as an orchestrator on more than 50 films for Warner Bros. Pictures, he won the Academy Award for Best Original Score for his music score for the drama film The Best Years of Our Lives (1946), death due to complications from an accidental fall
- Jeannette Piccard, 86, American high-altitude balloonist, and Episcopal priest, she was the first licensed female balloon pilot in the United States, and the first woman to fly to the stratosphere, she held the women's altitude record for nearly three decades, and according to several contemporaneous accounts, she was regarded as the first woman in space.

=== 18 ===
- Eleonore Baur, 95, German nurse, she was an early member of the Nazi Party and was the only woman known to have participated in the failed Beer Hall Putsch (1923), she survived the incident with only minor injuries, she was expelled from the Nazi Party in 1923, because she failed to pay her membership fees, she was later hired as a welfare nurse in the Reich Command of the SS, with the privileges of an SS Oberführer, she played a role in both the construction and the administration of the Dachau concentration camp, while there is no evidence that Baur physically harmed prisoners, she was repeatedly accused of bullying the prisoners, the staff, and her neighbours.
- Richard Hale, 88, American opera singer and character actor, he narrated the American premiere of Peter and the Wolf by Sergei Prokofiev, at Symphony Hall, Boston, with Prokofiev himself conducting, ; Hale was also the narrator for Arthur Fiedler's 1953 RCA recording of the same music with the Boston Pops,cardiovascular disease
- Arthur O'Connell, 73, American actor, he was twice nominated for the Academy Award for Best Supporting Actor for his roles in the romance film Picnic (1955) and the legal drama Anatomy of a Murder (1959), Alzheimer's disease
- William Saroyan, 72, American novelist, playwright, and short story writer, he was awarded the Pulitzer Prize for Drama for his play The Time of Your Life (1939) and the Academy Award for Best Story for his plot for the film The Human Comedy (1943),prostate cancer.

=== 20 ===
- Dositej II of Ohrid and Macedonia, 74, Serbian cleric, he served as the Metropolitan of Skopje from 1959 until 1967,he then served as the first archbishop of Ohrid and Macedonia from 1967 until his death in 1981, following the proclamation of the autocephaly of the Macedonian Orthodox Church by an Ohrid-based church assembly in 1967, this proclamation led to an open schism since the autocephaly was not recognized by the Serbian Orthodox Church, nor by any other autocephalous church, Dositej and the other bishops of the schismatic Macedonian Orthodox Church were indicted in the Serbian Orthodox Church court.

=== 21 ===
- Raymond McCreesh, 24, Irish paramilitary member, he was a volunteer in the South Armagh Brigade of the Provisional Irish Republican Army (IRA), in 1977, he was sentenced to 14 years in prison for the attempted murder of British soldiers, the possession of a rifle and ammunition, and a further five years for IRA membership, he starved himself to death while taking part in the 1981 Irish hunger strike
- Patsy O'Hara, 23, Irish paramilitary member, he joined both the Irish Republican Socialist Party (IRSP) and the Irish National Liberation Army (INLA) in 1975, in 1979, he was arrested and convicted of possessing a hand grenade, he was sentenced to eight years in prison in January 1980, he starved himself to death while taking part in the 1981 Irish hunger strike His corpse was found to be mysteriously disfigured prior to its departure from prison and before the funeral, including signs of his face being beaten, a broken nose, and cigarette burns on his body.
- Yuki Shimoda, 59, American actor and dancer, during World War II, following the signing of Executive Order 9066 (1942), Shimoda was incarcerated to the Tule Lake War Relocation Center,cancer
- Charles Yost, 73, American diplomat, he served as the ambassadors of the United States to the United Nations from 1969 until 1971

=== 22 ===
- Boris Sagal, 57, Ukrainian-born American television and film director, his works included the science fiction film The Omega Man (1971) and the historical drama miniseries Masada (1981), fatally injured in a helicopter accident while working on the production of the miniseries World War III (1982). Sagal was disoriented when he exited the helicopter, and he walked into the helicopter's tail rotor blades. He was partially decapitated, and he died a few hours following the accident.

=== 23 ===
- Rayner Heppenstall, 69, British novelist, poet, diarist, and BBC radio producer, he was George Orwell's friend and flatmate for some time, until he attacked Orwell while drunk,; Orwell then beat him up and forced him to move out of the flat, Heppenstall produced a radio adaptation of Orwell's Animal Farm in 1947, Heppenstall's posthumously published journals were controversial, because they revealed his hostility for a number of his fellow writers, and his prejudices against black people, Irish people, Arabs, and lesbians.
- George Jessel, 83, American actor, singer, songwriter, film producer, and master of ceremonies at political and entertainment gatherings, formerly a child actor, he started performing in vaudeville and on Broadway theatre at age 10, in order to support his family after the death of his father, in the early 1950s, he performed on the radio in The George Jessel Show, which became a television series of the same name (1953–1954), he reportedly attempted to sexually assault his fellow actress Shirley Temple in 1964, but he failed because she kicked him in the groin,heart attack

=== 24 ===
- Martha Bucaram, 39, Ecuadorian lawyer and feminist, she served as the first lady of Ecuador from 1979 until 1981, she fought for changes to the Civil Code of Ecuador that would expand the role of women in Ecuadorian society, ;as the first lady, she created the Office of Women, which has been attached to the Presidency since 1980, killed in an aviation accident
- Jaime Roldós Aguilera, 40, Ecuadorian politician, he served as the president of Ecuador from 1979 until his death in 1981, he was the first democratically-elected president of the country following a decade of military dictatorship, he criticized his political opponent José Napoleón Duarte, leader of the Revolutionary Government Junta of El Salvador, for rising to power "on a mountain of corpses” instead of gaining the popular vote, killed in an aviation accident
- Jack Warner, 85, British actor, he portrayed the police constable George Dixon in the police procedural film The Blue Lamp (1950), the most successful film at the box office that year, and he continued to portray the character in the long-running television adaptation Dixon of Dock Green (1955–1976), he was appointed an Officer of the Order of the British Empire (OBE) in 1965,pneumonia

=== 25 ===
- Roy Brown, 55 or 60, American blues singer, his hit song Good Rocking Tonight (1947) anticipated elements of rock and roll music and was reportedly the most successful record up to that point which used the word 'rock' as a descriptive for a new musical style, Brown continued to make his mark on the R&B charts, having 14 hits for De Luxe from mid-1948 until late 1951, including the million-selling, Hard Luck Blues (1950, his biggest seller),heart attack
- George Clark, 78, American cartoonist, primarily known for his syndicated cartoon panels The Neighbors (1939-1976) and Side Glances (1928-1939), his works reportedly combined humor with pathos, with a sad undertone in seemingly comedic scenes
- Ruby Payne-Scott, 68, Australian astronomer, she was a pioneer in the fields of radiophysics and radio astronomy, during World War II, she was engaged in top secret work investigating radar technology, becoming Australia's expert on the detection of aircraft using Plan Position Indicator (PPI) displays,; in 1948, she published a comprehensive report on factors affecting visibility on PPI displays, she also made important contributions to prototype radar systems operating in the 25cm microwave band, achieving significant improvements, Alzheimer's disease
- Rosa Ponselle, 84, American operatic dramatic soprano, she had a lucrative concert career during the 1920s, including a tour of the West Coast of the United States,; as her career progressed, Ponselle negotiated through her manager more concerts and exponentially higher fees before and after each Metropolitan Opera season,bone marrow cancer.
- A. Thiagarajah, 65, Sri Lankan Tamil teacher, politician and Member of Parliament, he was labelled a traitor by Tamil militants and Tamil nationalists, due to voting in favor of the new republican constitution in 1972,assassinated by the militant People's Liberation Organisation of Tamil Eelam (PLOTE)
- Fredric Warburg, 82, British publisher, he founded the company Secker & Warburg, when George Orwell parted company with Victor Gollancz, over publication of The Road to Wigan Pier (1937), he took his next book, Homage to Catalonia (1938) to Secker & Warburg, Warburg's firm published all of Orwell's books from then on, while Orwell and Warburg became intimate friends, Warburg is an important figure in the history and study of Cold War propaganda due to his work with Orwell's widow Sonia Orwell in a collaboration with the Information Research Department (IRD), a secret propaganda wing of the British Foreign Office, which helped to increase the fame of Animal Farm (1945) and Nineteen Eighty-Four (1949), with Warburg's support, the IRD was able to translate Animal Farm into more than 16 different languages, and for British embassies to disseminate the book in more than 14 countries for propaganda purposes,heart failure

=== 27 ===
- Kit Pedler, 53, English medical scientist, parapsychologist, and science fiction screenwriter and author, he was hired as the unofficial scientific adviser to the Doctor Who production team in the mid-1960s, Pedler and his writing partner Gerry Davis co-created the Cybermen, as a depiction of the problems of science changing and endangering human life, Pedler and Davis devised and co-wrote Doomwatch, a science fiction television programme produced for BBC1, Pedler authored the book Mind Over Matter (1981), which argued for the existence of psychic phenomena such as psychokinesis and remote viewing.

=== 28 ===
- Lem Billings, 65, American businessman, he was a classmate and close friend of John F. Kennedy during their teenage years in a college-preparatory school, and in their role as the founding members of a school club known as "The Muckers", Billings was later a lifelong associate and supporter of the Kennedy family, he worked on John F. Kennedy's successful campaign for election in the 1946 United States House of Representatives elections, and then toured seven Latin American countries with Robert F. Kennedy, Billings invented the 1950s fad drink Fizzies by adding a fruit flavor to disguise the sodium citrate taste, in 1960, he worked on the John F. Kennedy 1960 presidential campaign, he managed the campaign in the Third Congressional District in the Wisconsin primary and then served as a general troubleshooter and coordinator of television in the West Virginia primary, John Kennedy named Billings to the board planning the United States' participation in the New York World's Fair of 1964–1965, following the assassination of Robert F. Kennedy in 1968, Billings served as a mentor and surrogate father for Robert F. Kennedy Jr., he died in his sleep following a heart attack
- Reiko Sato, 49, American dancer and actress, Sato and her family were incarcerated at the Gila River War Relocation Center during World War II, following the signing of Executive Order 9066, in 1955, she played the female lead of Lotus Blossom in the second national tour of John Patrick's play The Teahouse of the August Moon opposite Larry Parks,brain aneurysm
- John Bryan Ward-Perkins, 69, British classical archaeologist and academic, he reinitiated the project to map the Roman Empire, Tabula Imperrii Romani, which had begun in 1928 but had become inactive.
- Mary Lou Williams, 71, American jazz pianist, arranger, and composer, she began performing publicly at the age of 7, when she became known admiringly as "The Little Piano Girl", she became a professional musician at the age of 15, she accepted an appointment at Duke University as the artist-in-residence (1977-1981),bladder cancer
- Stefan Wyszyński, 79, Polish Roman Catholic prelate, he served as both the archbishop of Warsaw and the primate of Poland from 1948 until 1981, he was elevated to the rank of cardinal in 1953, under Wyszyński, the Polish church gradually became an autonomous partner to the ruling nomenklatura in shaping the post-World War II Polish society,; rather than implementing the reforms of the Second Vatican Council (1962-1965), Wyszyński's Church cultivated moral authority by appealing to tradition,abdominal cancer

=== 29 ===
- Irving Briskin, 78, American film producer and studio executive, he variously served as the head of the foreign sales department of Sterling Pictures, the vice president of Sterling, the vice president of Columbia Pictures, and the head of television production for Columbia's subsidiary Screen Gems. He briefly owned shares of the Riviera Hotel in Las Vegas, Nevada from 1961 until 1962
- Soong Ching-ling, 88, Chinese politician, she was one of the three prominent Soong sisters who were raised as Christians in Shanghai and educated in the United States, where they all attended the Wesleyan College, she variously served as the Vice Chairperson of the National Committee of the Chinese People's Political Consultative Conference from 1954 until 1959, the Vice Chairperson of the Standing Committee of the National People's Congress (1954-1959, 1975-1981), the Vice Chairman of the People's Republic of China from 1959 until 1975, the de facto Heads of State of China from 1968 until 1972, and briefly the honorary Chairman of China in May 1981, chronic lymphocytic leukaemia

=== 30 ===
- Don Ashby, 26, Canadian professional ice hockey centre, fatally injured in a car accident, when his vehicle was hit head-on by a pickup truck
- Gwendolyn B. Bennett, 78, American artist, writer, and journalist, her column titled "The Ebony Flute" (1926–1928) distributed news about the many creative thinkers involved with the Harlem Renaissance, she served as a member of the Harlem Artists Guild in 1935, and the Harlem Community Art Center was under her leadership from 1939 until 1944, complications from cardiovascular disease
- Ziaur Rahman, 45, Bangladeshi military leader and politician, he served two terms as the Chief of Army Staff (1975, 1975–1978), he also served as the president of Bangladesh from 1977 until his death in 1981, he is credited as a solid administrator with pragmatic policies who contributed to the economic recovery of Bangladesh by liberalizing trade and promoting private sector investments.assassinated by members of the Bangladesh Army. Following Rahman's death, Muhammed Abul Manzur led a failed coup d'état. Manzur soon lost the support of his own troops.

=== 31 ===
- Barbara Ward, Baroness Jackson of Lodsworth, 67, British economist, journalist, lecturer and broadcaster, she acted as an adviser to various influential policy makers, including Robert McNamara at the World Bank and Lyndon B Johnson, who welcomed her thoughts on his Great Society projects despite her opposition to the Vietnam War.
- Gyula Lóránt, 58, Hungarian footballer and manager, as the coach of PAOK Thessaloniki, Lóránt won the Greek Championship in 1976, the first in the club's history, having 21 wins, 7 draws and two losses in thirty matches, he later coached Bayern Munich and Schalke 04, before returning to PAOK in the spring of 1980,heart attack while coaching a game from the bench. It was his third known heart attack, with the previous one occurring approximately a week before his death.
- Giuseppe Pella, 79, Italian Christian Democratic politician, he served as the prime minister of Italy from 1953 until 1954, and as the President of the Common Assembly from 1954 until 1956, during his term as prime minister, Pella created strife with Josip Broz Tito regarding the Free Territory of Trieste,; the Yugoslav president declared he would have invaded Trieste if the Americans had assigned it to Italy, Pella threatened to send troops to the Eastern border in response to Tito's provocation, the crisis that could result in a military confrontation was brought back after many diplomatic efforts by the Western powers.

== Sources ==
- Aloni, Shlomo (2013). Israeli A-4 Skyhawk Units in Combat (eBook). Bloomsbury Publishing. ISBN 9781849081290.
- English, Richard (2003). Armed struggle: the history of the IRA. New York: Oxford University Press. ISBN 0195166051.
- Epstein, Israel (1995). Woman in World History: The Life and Times of Soong Ching-ling. Beijing: New World Press. ISBN 7-80005-283-4.
- Gaye, Freda, ed. (1961). Who's Who in the Theatre (thirteenth ed.). London: Sir Isaac Pitman and Sons. OCLC 3039406.
- Goss, William Miller; McGee, Richard X. (2010). Under the Radar: The first woman in radio astronomy: Ruby Payne-Scott. Springer. ISBN 978-3-642-03140-3.
- Klein, Donald W.; Clark, Anne B. (1971). Biographic Dictionary of Chinese Communism, 1921–1965. Vol. 2. Cambridge, MA: Harvard University Press. ISBN 0-552-14108-9.
- Kompisch, Kathrin (2008). Täterinnen: Frauen im Nationalsozialismus (in German). Köln: Böhlau Verlag. ISBN 978-3-41220-188-3.
- David Michaelis, The Best of Friends: Profiles of Extraordinary Friendships (NY: Morrow, 1983)
- Michlic, Joanna; Polonsky, Antony (2005), "Catholicism and the Jews in Post-Communist Poland", in Lederhendler, Eli (ed.), Jews, Catholics, and the Burden of History, New York: Oxford University Press, pp. 35–64, ISBN 978-0-19-530491-6
- Murtagh, T. (2018). The Maze Prison: A Hidden Story of Chaos, Anarchy and Politics. Hook: Waterside Press. ISBN 978-1-90997-655-9.
- O'Hearn, Denis (2006). Nothing but an unfinished song : Bobby Sands, the Irish hunger striker who ignited a generation. New York: Nation Books. ISBN 978-1560258421.
- Geoffrey Perret, Jack: A Life Like No Other (NY: Random House, 2002)
- David Pitts, Jack and Lem: The Untold Story of an Extraordinary Friendship (NY: Carroll & Graf, 2007), ISBN 978-0-7867-1989-1
- Princess Olga Romanoff. My father and his family. Royalty Digest Quarterly. 2007 N 1.
- Warner, Jack (1975). Jack of All Trades: The Autobiography of Jack Warner. London: W. H. Allen. ISBN 0-491-01952-1
- Shayler, David; Moule, Ian A. (2005). Women in Space: – Following Valentina. Springer. ISBN 1-85233-744-3.
- Whittle, Richard (2014). Predator: The Secret Origins of the Drone Revolution (eBook). Henry Holt and Company. ISBN 9780805099652.
- Пузовић, Предраг (1999). "Раскол у Српској православној цркви - македонско црквено питање (The Rift in the Serbian Orthodox Church - The Macedonian Church Issue)". Вардарски зборник (1): 155–173.
