= Spikeball (company) =

American sports equipment company

Spikeball Inc.
- Company type: Private
- Industry: Sports equipment
- Founded: 2007; 19 years ago, in Chicago, Illinois, U.S.
- Founder: Chris Ruder
- Products: Nets and balls for roundnet
- Website: spikeball.com

Spikeball Inc. is an American sports equipment company that chiefly produces equipment for the game of roundnet. The company is the largest provider of roundnet equipment and sponsors tournaments in several countries including Belgium, Canada, Colombia, and the United States.

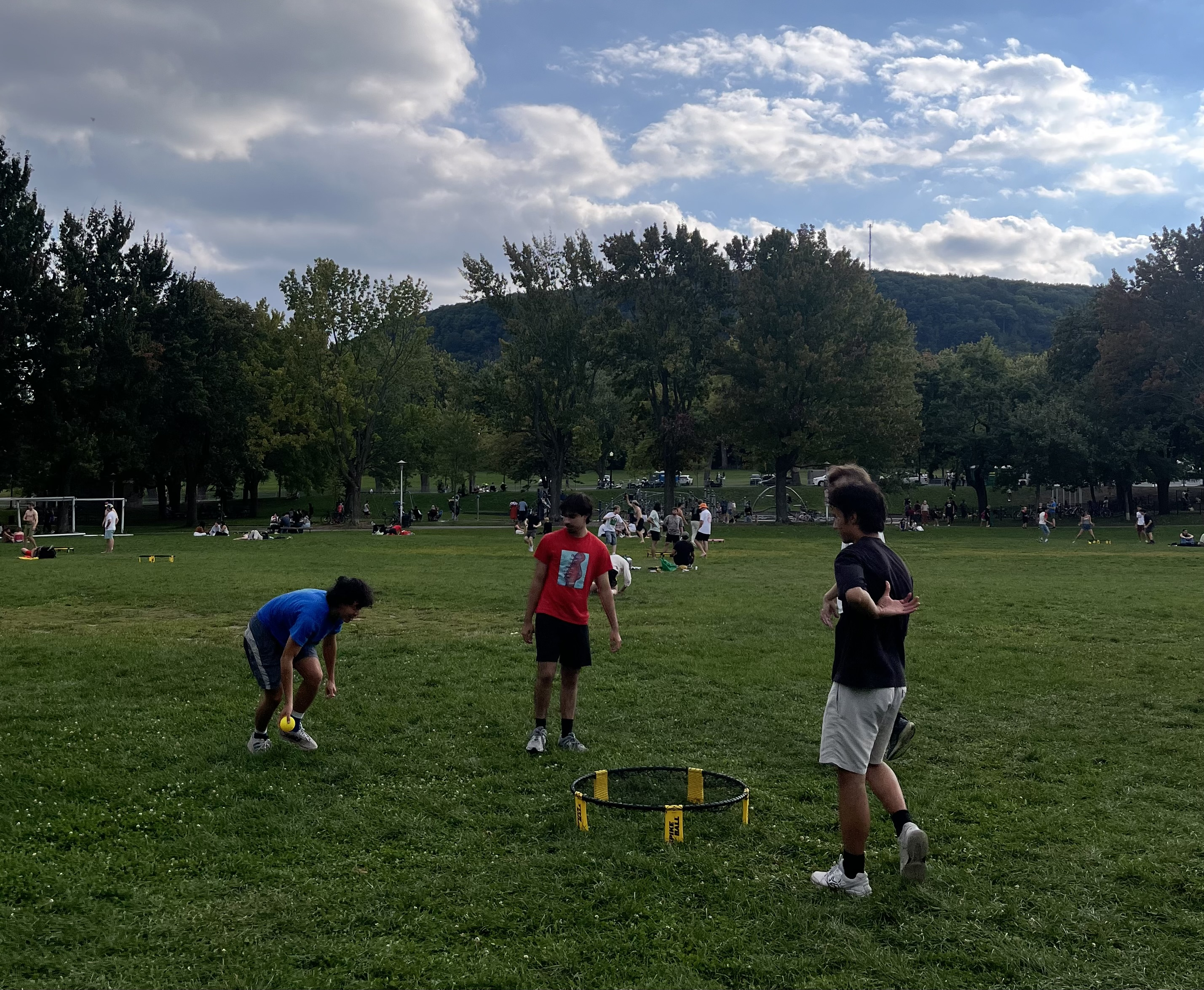
People playing roundnet with Spikeball equipment

The company was founded in 2007 by Chris Ruder and is based in Chicago, Illinois. Spikeball Roundnet Association tournaments began airing on ESPN2 in May 2018.

== History ==
The company was incorporated in 2007 and in 2008 began selling equipment for roundnet, a net sport that had been invented in the 1980s by Jeff Knurek, an American toymaker who did not patent it.

Roundnet, as the game is now known, is played with a small trampoline-like net placed on the ground between two teams with two players each who bounce a ball back and forth on the net, a play style that has been compared to volleyball.

Ruder had purchased a set during the brief period it was originally marketed in the 1980s. He and five of his friends raised a total of $100,000 as seed money for the company, which Ruder started in his basement. He purchased the rights to the product and contracted a manufacturer in China to produce the equipment.

When he started the company, Ruder was employed at Microsoft and Monster.com; he developed the business in his free time. He later worked for Live Nation in the ad sales department while continuing to build the company he founded. Ruder left his career in corporate sales in 2013 to work full time on his business. By then, the company was earning more than $1 million in annual revenue. Dick's Sporting Goods contacted him to become a retailer of Spikeball equipment in early 2013, followed by Big 5 and Modell's Sporting Goods. The company was granted a US patent for the game in August 2014.

In 2014, Ruder appeared on ABC's Shark Tank to offer 10% of the company for sale. Daymond John offered him $500,000 but wanted 20% of the company as well as control of licensing, manufacturing and retail. Ruder accepted, but the deal fell apart before the episode aired due to differences in strategy for the direction of the company.

In fall 2017, the company said it had sold its one-millionth net and was generating $15 million in sales per year.

== Tournaments and Spikeball Roundnet Association ==
In the early 2010s, the game began to gain a following among college-age enthusiasts in the Chicago area and then spread across the United States. Spikeball first sponsored a roundnet tournament in 2013 and founded the Spikeball Roundnet Association. A ranking system was introduced in 2016.

The game has become popular among the Mennonite community in Lancaster, Pennsylvania. In 2013, Corey Heck attended Creation, a Christian music festival, where he played the game and brought it to his community in Lancaster. He and his brother Caleb started weekly games which turned into daily events. They also started a Facebook group and eventually a local tournament. Initially, Ruder would write thank you notes to each customer who bought a set from his company, which led him to notice the popularity of the game in Lancaster. Spikeball brought its tournament tour to Lancaster in 2015 and 2016 before moving to a larger venue in Philadelphia in 2017. The move was unpopular, and the event garnered fewer participants, prompting the company to go back to Lancaster.

The first College Spikeball National Championship was held at Clemson University on April 29, 2017. A Spikeball tournament held in Lancaster in May 2018 became the first to air on ESPN2. Another tournament in Coney Island, New York, named SummerSpike 2018, aired on the same television network on June 30, 2018. The Spikeball tournament tour has also included stops in Boston, Massachusetts; the Jersey Shore region of New Jersey; Dewey Beach, Delaware; Savannah, Georgia; Long Beach, California; San Diego, California; Santa Monica, California; and Washington, D.C. The first World Championship was scheduled to take place in Belgium in September 2020, before it was rescheduled for September 2021 due to the COVID-19 pandemic.

== See also ==
- Crossnet
