= Drop serve =

Drop serve may refer to:

- A type of serve in the sport of pickleball
- A type of serve in the sport of roundnet
