= Net game =

Net game may refer to:

- Online game
- Net and wall games
