= Motley's Crew =

American comic strip

- Mike Motley and Mr. Drudge
- Author(s): Ben Templeton; Tom Forman
- Current status/schedule: No longer in publication
- Launch date: September 6, 1976
- End date: January 1, 2000
- Syndicate(s): Tribune Media Services
- Genre(s): Humor; Politics; Marriage

Motley's Crew was an American newspaper comic strip by Ben Templeton and Tom Forman with satirical social commentary. With readership spread among 250 newspapers in the United States alone, the comic strip acquired a highly devoted but relatively small group of fans during its 23 years of operation.

The comic strip, in general, was about a blue-collar worker named Mike Motley and his wife Mabel Motley. Truman Motley (Mike and Mabel's son) eventually fell in love and married a woman named Tacoma. From that marriage came two sons. Mabel's older brother Abel was often collaborating with his wife Buffy. Her role in being the middleman in the "friendly rivalry" between her brother Abel and her husband Mike is ultimately cancelled out by his mutual respect of both Abel and Buffy; they have a desire to visit Mabel on an occasional basis.

According to a 1997 comics poll conducted by the New York Daily News, Motley's Crew was elected as the 28th most favorite comic strip among readers and visitors to the official Internet site. The comic strip was considered to be more popular than B.C. (still in publication) but less popular than Broom-Hilda (still in publication). However, it also voted as the 30th least favorite comic strip in the same poll; indicating that more people liked the Motley's Crew comic strip than hated it. Templeton and Forman created the comic in 1976. It was first syndicated by what is known today as Tribune Content Agency on September 6 of that year. Templeton and Forman were working together on it until Forman's death in 1996. After Forman's death, Templeton continued alone. It continued until January 1, 2000.

The final week's strips dealt with the cast trying to cope with the possible effects of the Y2K bug. Earl had the computers in the factory "bug proofed" but for the year 3000. Mike had to fix the computers so they were ready for the year 2000 instead. On the first day of the year 2000, the final comic strip ever to be printed presented long-time fans and casual readers with a sign with the words "This space for rent."

Since then, Motley's Crew comic strips have been sought by collectors of contemporary comic strips. Archived comic strips can be viewed on Google News Archives by simply typing in the name of the comic strip. However, not all issues of the Motley's Crew comic strip are available to view on the Google News because they stopped scanning old newspapers in May 2011.

== Cast of characters ==
=== Mabel Motley ===
Mabel Motley

In-universe information
- Occupation: Homemaker
- Nationality: United States

In the comic strip Motley's Crew, Mabel Motley was a stay-at-home mother. Her eyes were drawn throughout the comic strip series as a simple narrow dot. Mabel's primary task in the family was to cook and clean while her husband was working and providing a paycheck for the family unit. Eventually, she became a grandmother later in the lifetime of the comic strip. Mabel revealed some of the aspects of her personality during her time as a wife and a mother. She would frequently complained about her husband spending his weekend afternoons doing nothing but watching sports on the television. With all the masculine elements that the comic strip portrayed, having Mike Motley married to her provided a feminine balance to the comic strip.

Mabel jokingly described her marriage to Mike as a "no-huddle marriage" when they were receiving marriage counseling. She proudly maintains a "smoke-free" house to the chagrin of her husband's friend Cronin. Some issues of the comic strip would show Mabel having a developed bust line, particularly if she is wearing a nightgown. Gardening to an extremely strict daily routine was also a part of her life; even to the point of doing it in a terrible rainstorm and worrying her adult son Truman.

Setting her husband straight was always one of Mabel's things that kept her occupied. After Mike tried to bend the rules for certain situations, she would get upset with him. Strong criticism is often a part of being around her husband Mike. For example, a situation occurred where Mike refused to wear a necktie to a wedding service. Mabel even forced her husband put on a formal outfit that wasn't exactly perfect in order to create an illusion of dignity for Mabel's side of the family.

Abel and Buffy are two beloved members of her family; with Abel being her brother and Buffy being her sister-in-law. Like his brother-in-law Mike, Abel has been known to enjoy a good drink of beer. However, Abel and Buffy both have a "friendly rivalry" against Mike; a stereotypical trait used throughout mainstream media when depicting in-laws.

=== Mike Motley ===
Mike Motley

In-universe information
- Occupation: Factory worker (earlier strips); Webmaster (later strips)

In the comic strip Motley's Crew, Michael "Mike" Motley was a middle aged unskilled factory worker (later being promoted to webmaster). He is of Scottish descent; a discovery that he made while on a trip to Europe and coming home to America wearing a traditional Scottish kilt. Unlike his wife, Mike would have wide eyes; depicted by a large hollow ellipse surrounding a simple black dot.

He worked for his employer Mister Drudge and was married to his equally middle aged wife Mabel, who occasionally got to see her husband watching the New York Yankees instead of monitoring the plant on "Take Your Spouse to Work Day."

Even with his busy schedule of work, family, and bar life, Mike still had time to travel the world. His drinking habits eventually got him in trouble with his doctor; causing Mabel to hide his beer until he returned to a healthy weight. When his son Truman hit hard times at his workplace, Mike was there to lend him a hand and help him recuperate from his losses.

During Abel and Buffy's visit, Mabel had to have a formal outfit in reserve for Mike in order to give off an illusion of expensive taste in apparel. This one-time gag appeared on the August 28, 1997 episode of the comic strip; the visit took place on a leisurely Thursday afternoon. Mike was chosen to wear an effeminate white tie outfit consisting of a black jacket, white bow tie, white tuxedo shirt, white vest and black formal trousers for Abel and Buffy's visit. The effeminate outfit somehow got a flaw in it from Mike struggling to get it on; making him look like a fool in front of his in-laws. After the visit is over, even his wife Mabel is glad to see her brother and his wife leave the house. She is lying down in the couch all exhausted because Abel and Buffy were acting in a hyperactive manner throughout the house.

==== Mike's Rivalries ====
In the comic strip, Mister Drudge was considered to be an autocratic factory manager. He personally ran the fictional corporation Drudge Industries, Inc., which was a company involved in the manufacturing industry. His signature was on every paycheck that Mike Motley and his other subordinates received after working. The coarse nature of his operations is what kept the workplace in perfect working condition. Traditional gender roles reigned supreme in his factory. In addition to all that, Mister Drudge also had an obedient female secretary that was always ready to take orders from him. His last name came from a word that means "labor" or "work." Very rarely did anyone receive a pay raise or a promotion in his manufacturing company.

It was never officially explained when a "friendly rivalry" between Mike, Abel, and Buffy began; a firm example of this rivalry was on an August 28, 1997 episode of the comic strip. The fact remained that any good intentions that Abel and Buffy had were quickly repulsed by Mike Motley at first glance. Mike always realized his hatred for Abel and Buffy when they arrived at a time when he wanted to be with his wife and not have to deal with her relatives on a social trip. Mabel always got him in the mood for all their visits because Abel and Buffy were a part of her family by birth. Mike always complains about either Abel or Buffy doing something wrong to him or his property at the end of their visits. Since Mabel has to be nice to her brother and his wife, she usually took his remarks with a grain of salt and have him look suitable for the occasion.

Mabel's relatives were always a thorn according to her husband Mike; especially Abel and Buffy. He never really like any of her relatives because of their eccentric quirks. Buffy was always too obsessed with being clean while Abel was a frugal handyman. Mike was never much for cleanliness and he did not particularly wanted to be a handyman; he was a factory worker by trade and had the pride of a factory worker.

Being the main character of the comic strip meant being exposed to the most gags throughout the series, and this gag would eventually become par for the course throughout the remaining two years of its run.

=== Abel and Buffy ===
Abel and Buffy ?

In-universe information
- Occupation: Homemaker (Buffy); Handyman (Abel)

Mabel: 'Mike, what are you thinking of ? Abel and Buffy should be here any second.' / Mike (in his tee shirt and boxer shorts): 'This is as dressed up as I'm getting.' / Mike (in a white tie outfit that looks torn apart in certain places): 'Hi ya Abel Buffy.'

— Mike and Mabel Motley before and after Abel and Buffy arrived at their house

Abel and Buffy provided comic relief when Mabel coerced her husband into embarrassing situations.

This fact was especially revealed in a comic strip that was published on August 28, 1997. Abel is portrayed in the comic strip as wearing a business suit, white dress shirt and a necktie while Buffy is wearing a black sweater, a long skirt and an elegant white handbag on her body. As a couple, they jointly made their way to Mabel and Mike Motley's house to see their embarrassed brother-in-law Mike Motley completely dazed and confused from events that they did not see; particularly from Mabel giving her husband a pair of black eyes.

Mike Motley would end up seeing his wife's sister and brother-in-law come into the living room in order to create an elegant experience to their visit. His bald spot was now considered to be more clearly shown because his wife lacked the proper knowledge in how to comb a man's hair (this shallow attempt at being perfect was taken by Mabel because she didn't want her brother and his wife to think that her husband is going bald).

Buffy had a medium-sized nose and her eyes were constantly hidden by thick eyeglasses. Meanwhile, Abel and his sister Mabel shared a common trait for narrow eyes and blond hair. His nephew Truman would also inherit the blond hair that is a dominant feature for that side of the family.

=== Truman and Tacoma Motley ===
Truman and Tacoma Motley were second-generation characters created by Ben Templeton and Tom Forman in order to provide the main characters Mike and Mabel Motley with children of their own. They appeared in the American comic strip Motley's Crew.

Truman and Tacoma Motley

In-universe information
- Occupation: Accountant (Tacoma); Unknown (Truman)

Truman Motley (born circa 1971) was the son of Mike and Mabel Motley and the nephew of Abel and Buffy. He shares the same blonde hair as his mother Mabel while his physical appearance resembled a younger version of his father Mike. Despite enduring economic troubles in the mid-1990s and temporarily losing his job, Truman had a secure marriage and a happy life.

Truman sometimes worries about his mother doing things that she shouldn't do; like the time where she got the crazy idea to do her daily gardening in a heavy rainstorm. Even though the rain was providing natural water to the flowers, Mabel had to use water from her garden hose in order to keep up her normal routine. Like his parents, Truman is not a fan of his Aunt Buffy's obsessive habits in the kitchen and questioned her for alphabetizing the pantry.

Tacoma Motley was the wife of Mike and Mabel Motley's son in addition to being the niece-in-law of Abel and Buffy. She married the Motley's son Truman out of her love for him. Some of the comic strips show her with a slight bust line. Tacoma's willingness to have a career and to be a mother at the same time shows the contradictions between the Truman Motley family and the Mike Motley family. As the equivalent of Michael Stivic from the television show All in the Family, Tacoma shared the same liberal values as Gloria Stivic's husband in the TV show.

Their children were born sometime around the year 1988 and were first introduced around August 1998 with the appearance of fraternal male twins. Eventually, they grew up to be children in the early stages of puberty that confuse their grandfather's work clothes for the baggy clothing that was popular among youth in the late 1990s.

At least one of the grandsons was informally called "Junior" throughout the late 1990s running of the comic strip.

=== Earl and Abigail Bird ===
Earl and Abigail Bird

In-universe information
- Occupation: Homemaker (Abigail); Factory worker (Earl)

Earl Bird was the African-American next-door neighbor of Mike and Mabel Motley and a fellow worker at Drudge Industries and they were seen working side by side. Earl usually had a cigar in his mouth and was the most incompetent person in the comic strip; once confusing a microwave for a television set. When he was captured and forced to steer a ship, he took command of the ship until it collided with land in the middle of Kansas. The humor behind that scenario was that ships cannot land in Kansas; Earl was clearly an incompetent sailor and no clear explanation was given about the reason of giving him command of an entire ship.

During the earlier years of the comic strip, Earl complained about the white flight from metropolitan cities into more suburban areas due to rising crime in the inner sections of North American cities. Humor was added when Earl talked about the things that suburban people had (swimming pools, shade trees, lawns) and complained about not being able to afford to move out of an inner city environment to enjoy them.

Abigail Bird was Earl's wife who had suffered for a long time with him.

=== Mister Drudge ===
Mister Drudge

In-universe information
- Occupation: Factory manager

In the comic strip, Mister Drudge was considered to be an autocratic factory manager.

He personally ran the fictional corporation Drudge Industries, Inc., which was a construction company. Very rarely did anyone receive a pay raise or a promotion in his construction company. Never on a first name basis with anyone, Mister Drudge insisted that his first name was "Mister."

Mister Drudge was considered to be a very young person, with red hair, very young skin, and a white bow tie. He also appeared content in his successful life running a major corporation at his age. Some of his clichéd adventures involved being marooned on a desert island while hallucinating about his riches and his hired lawyers. Through some form or another, he always got rescued from the island but not before being surrounded by sharks, the golden sands of the island, and a meager palm tree. This tragic event would happen to Mister Drudge exactly four times in the course of two years.

=== Cronin ===
Cronin

In-universe information
- Occupation: Factory worker

In the comic strip, Cronin made infrequent appearances; usually as comic relief within Mike Motley's workplace.

He is usually drunk and hanging out at the same neighborhood bar as Mike Motley; occasionally drinking beer alongside him. When Cronin gets drunk, Earl usually has to drive his friend Mike home and faces the consequences for the various stunts that he fulfills while he is inebriated. Cronin became the laughing stock of the entire workplace when God claimed that "only people who wear their underwear on the outside can go to Heaven." Even the other workers have fun at Cronin's expense at work the next day when he does crazy stuff. He usually hangs out of the bus stop; indicating that Cronin's lifestyle doesn't allow him to maintain an automobile. Cronin also carries a lunch box with him most of the time.

Unlike his friend Mike Motley, Cronin was the swinging bachelor who desperately looked for girlfriends of ill repute. He used the payphone at the local bar in order to contact the "women of his dreams."

=== Yuri Litnov ===
Yuri Litnov

In-universe information
- Occupation: Worker (earlier strips); Casino owner (early-mid 1990s); Unemployed (later strips)
- Nationality: Soviet Union

Yuri Litnov was Mike Motley's friend from Russia (which was part of the Soviet Union during most of the comic strip's production).

He provided Cold War humor from the perspective of what Americans were conditioned to believe to be the "enemy" during the Cold War years. This character was used the most often during the Mikhail Gorbachev administration. While Yuri was visited by his friend Mike Motley in the then-current Soviet Union, Yuri rarely traveled to America. The reason for Yuri's lack of visits to the United States was that financial and security reasons prevented citizens from the Soviet Union from entering Western Bloc countries during that time. During the 1980s when the Soviets were warming relations with the United States, Mike (representing the United States of America and his capitalist employer) had fewer financial and security restrictions upon entering the Soviet Union.

Yuri was fortunately enough to become a casino owner in Moscow, Russia as of March 28, 1994; effectively becoming one of the Russian oligarchs who financially dominated Russia during the 1990s. However, he would lose everything to a divorce; forcing himself to be shipped via a cargo crate to America. Ben Templeton has a strong interest in the former Soviet Union and has made a novel about the country called The Last Decathlon; which is a thriller novel that takes place in the 1980s.

== Politics and conservatism ==
Despite other comic strips changing completely with the times to suit a younger audience, older fans of the comic strip wanted to keep traditional gender roles present in the comic strip as much as possible. Therefore, any changes to the main characters were seen as temporary and made to look as foolish as possible in order to create a laughter effect. Like the other suburban residents, Mike owned a car in which he used to travel to work and play. In addition to factories, houses, and office buildings, the neighborhood also had a bar, a health clinic, a church, a beach, and other fine places where Mike, his friends and family all worked and played at. Humor was found in the least expected places like a reception area in a hospital being confused for a place where footballs are caught in an American football field for a touchdown.

Rarely were any of the characters were seen walking, jogging, or using any form of mass transit on Motley's Crew as the characters never saw anything else but automobile travel as a priority for the characters. Environmentalists were still seen as the "potential destroyers of the country" because Mike didn't want to fix his faucet for $30 ($117.23 in today's money) instead of buying a new one for $10 ($39.08 in today's money). After establishing its core audience in the 1970s and 1980s, the comic strip started to deal with issues that they deal with. Middle aged people and the elderly were considered to be the target demographic for this comic strip throughout its entire run.

Home computers and microprocessors were dealt with as processors of bills and income (as opposed to electronic video games) in a comic strip back in 1982. Political issues (such as the mistakes made by the Department of Defense in the late 1980s) were dealt with in a conservative but humorous manner. Conservatism could also be seen with stereotypical images of young people graduating from college. The newly graduated student joins the real world with his philosophy degree and ends up becoming a shepherd. At the end of that comic strip, the sheep were thinking "How come we always get stuck with the philosophy majors?"
