= Bottom Liners =

Syndicated comic strip

Bottom Liners is a one-panel comic strip devised by cartoonists Eric and Bill Teitelbaum, syndicated by Tribune Content Agency. The themes of the strip are the worlds of business and finance.
