= Ching Chow =

American comic strip

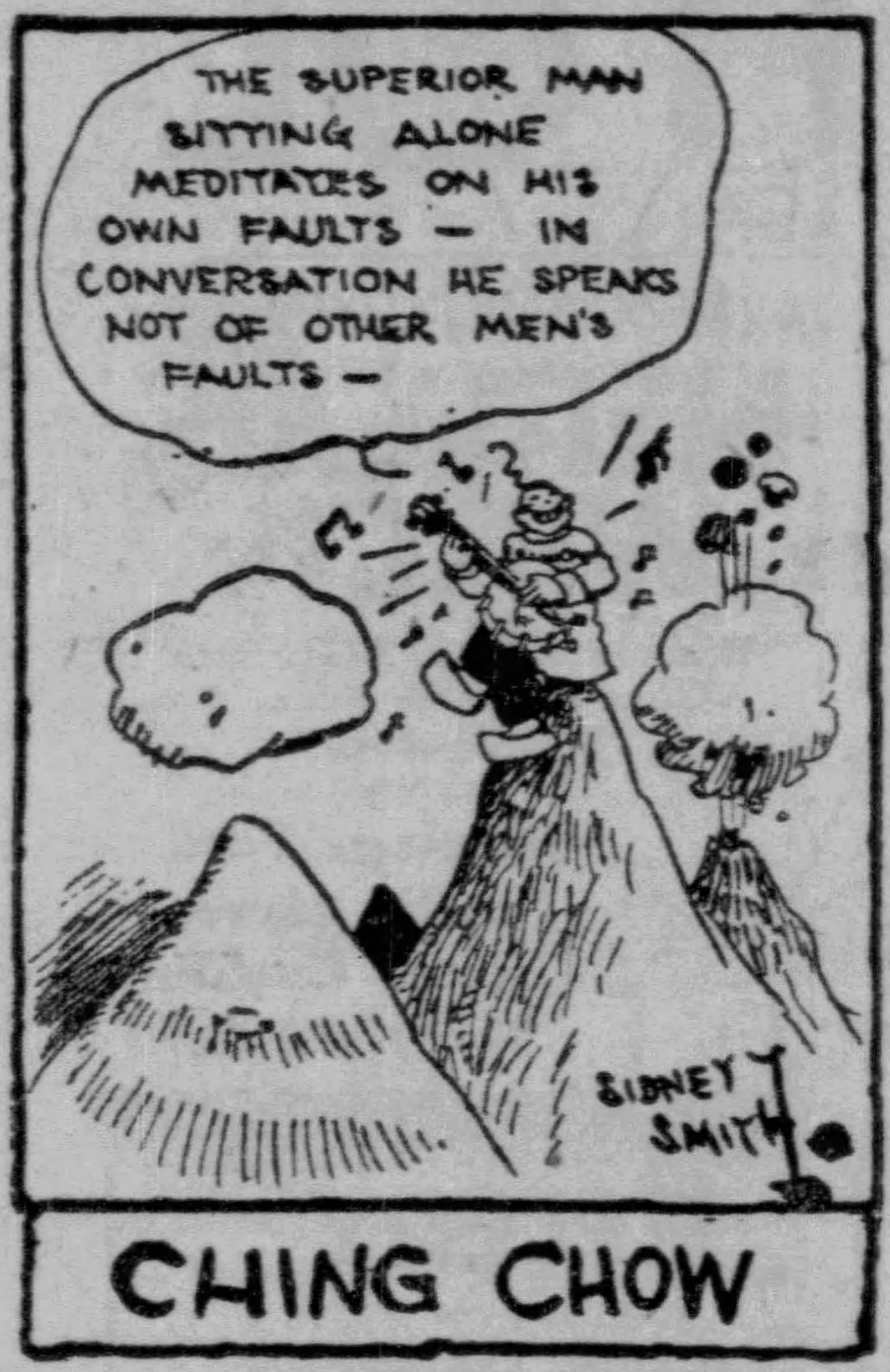
- The debut Ching Chow panel of January 17, 1927
- Author(s): Sidney Smith (1927–1935) and Stanley Link (1927–1957); Will Henry (1957–1971); Rocco Lotito (1975–1976)
- Illustrator(s): Will Levinson (1975–1976); Henri Arnold (1976–1990)
- Current status/schedule: Concluded gag panel
- Launch date: (first run) January 17, 1927 (second run) 1975
- End date: (first run) 1971 (second run) May 12, 1990
- Syndicate(s): Chicago Tribune Syndicate
- Genre(s): Humor, gag-a-day, satire

Ching Chow is an American one-panel cartoon that was created by Sidney Smith and Stanley Link. It first appeared on January 17, 1927, and ran for more than 60 years, under a variety of different creators. It was distributed by the Chicago Tribune / New York Daily News Syndicate. The title character was a stereotypical Chinese man with slanty eyes and a big, toothy grin. He offered pearls of Confucius-style wisdom, like "Beware of silent dog and still water."

Because Ching Chow was first published in the United States in 1927, the character entered the public domain in 2023.

== Publication history ==
Comic strip expert Don Markstein postulates that Link illustrated the strip from the beginning, with the more well-known Smith's name being attached to give the strip credibility. When Smith died in 1935, Link's name was credited, until his own death in 1957. Link's former assistant Will Henry then produced the strip until it ended syndication in 1971.

The strip was revived from 1975 to 1976 by the writer/illustrator team of Rocco Lotito and Will Levinson. Henri Arnold wrote and drew the strip from 1976 until it was discontinued on May 12, 1990. Arnold created a new cartoon, Meet Mr. Luckey, "a virtually identical strip except that it now featured a life-size leprechaun." He continued with Mr. Luckey until 2009, when it was officially retired.

== Concept ==
As with Charlie Chan, in later decades critics took contending views, finding that Ching Chow reinforced condescending Asian stereotypes such as an alleged incapacity to speak idiomatic English and a tradition-bound and subservient nature. As one critic wrote about Ching Chow, "It wasn’t as much a strip as it was a daily fortune cookie."

In later years, Ching Chow was viewed by many as a secret tip sheet for playing the numbers – the panel would appear far in the back pages of the New York Daily News. In a 1978 Village Voice article, one believer is quoted as saying, "Why you think Ching Chow has been in the newspaper all these years? Because it's funny? Hah, hah."

== See also ==
- Hambone's Meditations
- Abe Martin of Brown County
