= Bill Schorr =

American cartoonist

- Born: New York City
- Area: Cartoonist
- Notable works: Conrad; The Grizzwells
- Awards: National Cartoonists Society Editorial Cartoon Award, 1993

Bill Schorr is an American cartoonist of syndicated editorial cartoons and comic strips.

== Early life ==
Schorr was born in New York City, and was raised in and grew up in Albuquerque, New Mexico, and California.

== Career ==
Schorr has been an editorial cartoonist for the Kansas City Star (where he got his start in 1973), the Los Angeles Herald Examiner, and the New York Daily News. In addition to his editorial cartoons, Schorr has also created the following comic strips:

- Conrad (1982–1986, Tribune Media Services)
- The Grizzwells (1987–present, Newspaper Enterprise Association)
- Phoebe's Place (1990–1991, Los Angeles Times Syndicate)

Schorr retired in March 2009 but came out of retirement by August of the same year.

== Comic books ==
- P.J. Warlock (Eclipse Comics, 1986)

== Awards ==
He received the National Cartoonists Society Editorial Cartoon Award for 1993 and nominations for the same award for 1997 and 1998.
