= Antoinette Donnelly =

- Born: 1887
- Died: November 15, 1964 (aged 76–77); Greenwich, Connecticut

Antoinette Donnelly (1887–1964), was an American newspaper advice columnist and author of self-help and weight loss books. She published advice columns from 1919 to 1963, initially writing just the "Beauty Answers" in the New York Daily News and other papers under the name Antoinette Donnelly before later adding an "Advice to the Lovelorn" column under the name Doris Blake, which was syndicated in 45 newspapers via the Daily News and Chicago Tribune syndicate.

== Advice columns ==
Donnelly started her career at the Chicago Tribune writing material on beauty, romance (as Doris Blake), play, and babies. For her beauty columns, Donnelly frequently published full-page spreads such as "How to be Pretty on Your Wedding Day" and "Cosmetics May Drive Blues Away"

In 1941, Life magazine reported that Donnelly received 200,000 letters each year and had a staff of five to respond to them with "harsh, uncomforting words of bleak good sense". Just as future advice columnists Ann Landers and Abigail Van Buren of "Dear Abby" would do, she mailed booklets to female readers who provided a self-addressed stamped envelope. These booklets ranged from Getting and Keeping Boys Interested to What About Petting? to How to Be Happy Though Married. Donnelly also served as a co-editor of the short-lived The Woman's Almanac. One column that addressed weight loss in men and women prompted 10,000 letters from readers to the New York Daily News alone.

== Book publishing ==
In late 1920, she wrote a diet book under the name Antoinette Donnelly called How to Reduce: New Waistlines for Old, published by D. Appleton & Company). In it, she claimed, "Diet is the dictator, commander, ruler of weight" and assured readers, "Yours the poser to curb the dictator and direct him into different channels if his present course is spelling ruin to your fitness." The book discourages consumption of carbohydrates including sweets, bread, and potatoes. In addition, it offers specific diet plans based on desired weight loss and desired number of weeks. To lose 16 pounds in 6 weeks, Donnelley instructed readers to replace one meal per day with raw carrots and celery, washed down with half a glass of orange juice. For 20 pounds in 12 weeks, she prescribed the following diet:

- Breakfast: grapefruit, an egg, slice of toast, and 2-3 oz lean meat or fish, black coffee
- Dinner: meat soup with the fat skimmed off, 4-5 oz lean roast beef, stewed tomatoes, spinach, and either fruit or half glass orange juice.
- Supper: 2-3oz cottage cheese, toast, fruit, tea with lemon

Prior to the book's publication, Donnelly enlisted 25 overweight men and attempted to coach them to weight loss in less time than it took a male doctor to do the same with 25 female counterparts. She said age 30 was "a turning point in many a slenderous career."

== Personal life ==
Antoinette Donnelly retired from the Daily News at the end of 1962. She lived with her daughter in Greenwich, Connecticut, and another daughter lived with the Roman CathoIic Assumption Order at the Monastery of the Blessed Sacrament in Yonkers. She died on November 15, 1964. Despite her career giving romance advice, Life magazine described Donnelly's own marriage as unhappy.
