= Conrad (comic strip) =

American comic strip by Bill Schorr

- Author: Bill Schorr
- Current status/schedule: Concluded daily strip
- Launch date: November 8, 1982
- End date: June 7, 1986
- Syndicate(s): Tribune Media Services
- Publisher: Pocket Books
- Genre(s): Humor, Anthropomorphic animals
- Followed by: The Grizzwells

Bill Schorr's Conrad (1983)

Conrad was a comic strip about "America's favorite frog prince". Written and illustrated by Bill Schorr, the strip was launched November 8, 1982. Syndicated by Tribune Media Services, it had a run for over three years, ending June 7, 1986.

== Characters and story ==
The frog Conrad, needing money to pay his bookie, convinces the fat, dim-witted fairy tale princess that he is an enchanted prince who can be turned into a human by a kiss.

Other characters include the princess' father, the King, who is skeptical that Conrad is a prince, and resident witch Aggie, who grants spells and potions to the princess. Fido, the princess's pet alligator, thinks he is a dog.

== TV appearance ==
A live action Conrad sketch (with a large puppet portraying the frog) was included in the special Mother's Day Sunday Funnies broadcast May 8, 1983 on NBC.

== More by Schorr ==
The strip did not catch on and was dropped in the summer of 1986. In addition to editorial cartoons, Bill Schorr went on to create two more comic strips: The Grizzwells (1987–present) and Phoebe's Place (1990-1991).

== Books ==
Two Conrad book collections were published in 1985.

Title	Cover	Publication Date	ISBN
Conrad		June, 1985	ISBN 0-671-50824-5
Short, Green and Conrad	"Short, Green and Conrad."	December, 1985	ISBN 0-671-50825-3
