= Crossnet =

American sports equipment company

- Company type: Private
- Industry: Sports equipment
- Founded: 2017; 8 years ago in Miami, Florida, U.S.
- Website: crossnetgame.com

Crossnet (also known as CROSSNET) is an American sports equipment company that produces a four-way volleyball game of the same name. Crossnet is a combination of volleyball and four square, in a competitive game.

== History ==
In 2017, the game was devised in the farm town of Woodstock, Connecticut by brothers Chris and Greg Meade and their childhood friend Mike Delpapa, with inspiration from KanJam and four square. Chris said in interview that, to some degree, the motivation he and his brother had to create the company came from the experience of losing their father in 2012. In 2014, Chris graduated from Quinnipiac University with a film degree, and Delpapa graduated from Northeastern University with an engineering degree. In 2012, Greg enrolled at Eastern Connecticut State University with a marketing degree before dropping out in order to pursue entrepreneurial ventures.

At the time the idea was conceived in May 2017, Chris was working at the Uber HQ as an Account Executive who helped to launch Uber Eats. Before investing their life savings and quitting their jobs, the team tested the concept by purchasing volleyball nets from Walmart and repurposing them into a makeshift prototype in January 2018. Shortly after, they patented and trademarked the idea, and then discovered a Chinese manufacturer through Alibaba Group who could make a real prototype for $250. By June 2018, inventory was first being sold. In 2018, the company made $74K in revenue, and in 2019, they made $2.25M in revenue (30x increase from the year earlier).

In 2021, USA Volleyball began an official partnership with Crossnet. In the same year, Crossnet was recognized as one of the Forbes 30 Under 30 sports companies. The company also established a warehouse in Canada and developed a branded partnership with Wilson.

In 2021 and 2023, a Crossnet tournament in Chula Vista, California was shown on ESPN8 The Ocho with contestants competing for a $10K purse. Crossnet has been featured on People, WFLA-TV, The Ellen DeGeneres Show, Good Morning America, Today Show, WDBD, Chicago Tribune, HuffPost, and many more.

According to the company, in 2022 the game was played in over 100 thousand households, more than 10 thousand schools, distributed in 49 countries, and supplied by over 3 thousand retailers, including Walmart, Target, Sam's Club, Academy Sports, and Dick's Sporting Goods. In 2020, 1,000 Crossnet sets were donated to underfunded schools.

The Meade brothers and Delpapa have created additional games, including Smashnet (hybrid sport where roundnet meets ping pong), under the Good Sport brand.

On August 15, 2025, Vivere Ltd., a Canadian outdoor living company acquired Crossnet for an undisclosed amount.

== Rules ==
The game consists of four quadrants: four players choose their own squares. The game begins with the 4th square diagonally serving to the 2nd square and the 2nd then returns the ball with one hit to any square to start the rally. When the ball lands in a player's square they are eliminated, and the player in the 4th square always scores a point but only if the player in the 4th square is not eliminated (otherwise, no points are received by any); the remaining three players all rotate clockwise, and the eliminated player keeps their points but goes back to the 1st square or is replaced by a new player in the 1st square. The game is played to 11 points (win by 2).

A player is eliminated when the ball lands on the ground inside their own square; player returns the ball out of bounds; player fails to hit the ball into another square; player double hits the ball; player hits the ball incorrectly; or player hits the ball out of turn. The ball is considered in play when the ball lands on the outside boundary. Players are not allowed to catch, hold, or carry the ball at any point during play. Players are required to hit the ball with their "hands", which is any section between the fingertips and wrists, including the back of the hands.

=== Dimensions ===
Crossnet is height-adjustable to both regulation women's and men's volleyball height. The men's height is 7 feet 11 5/8 inches (2.429 m) and the women's height is 7 feet 4 1/8 inches (2.238 m). The single-length Crossnet is 13 feet 1 1/2 inches (4.001 m), and each of the four squares is 6 feet 7 inches (2.01 m) wide.

== Strategy ==
The objective of the game is to remove players in higher squares so that oneself can advance to the highest square where points are awarded. When one player has a significant lead over the other three players, it is common for the three players to join forces to repeatedly target and eliminate the leading player.

== Variations ==
Crossnet has two models for different terrains: an indoor version for wood courts and outdoor version for grass and sand. Also, the company created a pickleball, pool, and soccer variation. Along with the standard variety, there is also the double-length net, which allows for double the number of players (8 total for 2 vs 2 vs 2 vs 2).

== See also ==
- Volleyball jargon
- Volleyball variations
- Spikeball (company)
- Roundnet
