= Arthur Radebaugh =

- Born: May 1906; Coldwater, Michigan, U.S.
- Died: January 17, 1974 (aged 67); Grand Rapids, Michigan, U.S.
- Occupations: Illustrator, comics artist

Arthur Radebaugh (1906–1974) was an American futurist, illustrator, airbrush artist, and industrial designer. He produced a significant body of work for the automotive industry. He was noted for his artistic experimentation with fluorescent paint under black light, an interest that stemmed from his design work for the U.S. Army. From 1958 to 1963 he produced the syndicated Sunday comic strip Closer Than We Think! for the Chicago Tribune-New York News Syndicate.
