= David L. Hoyt =

American puzzle and game inventor and author

David L. Hoyt is an American puzzle and game inventor and author.

== Personal life ==
David Lawrence Hoyt was born in Waterbury, Connecticut, in 1965. He lives in Grapeview, Washington with his wife, Claire.

== Career ==
Hoyt is the inventor of numerous well-known puzzles, games and brain teasers including USA Today Word Roundup, USA Today Up & Down Words, Jumble Crosswords, TV Jumble and more. He is the current co-author of Jumble, the most syndicated daily word game in the world.

His print puzzles and games are syndicated by Tribune Content Agency and Universal Uclick and are carried in more than 700 newspapers, including USA Today, New York Daily News, Chicago Tribune, Los Angeles Times and The Washington Post. Hoyt’s online games are featured on sites such as Shockwave.com, Yahoo.com, MSN.com and Games.com. Hoyt also develops puzzles and games across a number of other platforms including mobile, casino games, instant scratch-off games, books and calendars.

Hoyt moved to Chicago in 1990 to work as an option and futures trader on the floor of the Chicago Board of Options Exchange. While working there, he began developing various toys, games and puzzles in his spare time. In 1993, he sold his first game, Crossword the Game, to Parker Brothers. Shortly after, in 1994, he started developing games full-time. Two years later, he partnered with Tribune Content Agency (TCA), the owners of Jumble, to develop new versions of Jumble including Jumble Crosswords, TV Jumble and Jumble BrainBusters. The daily and the Sunday Jumble puzzles appear in more than 600 newspapers internationally and across the United States.

In 2002, Hoyt partnered with Jeff Knurek, Tribune Content Agency, and Hasbro to develop the Boggle BrainBuster syndicated daily puzzle.

Hoyt teamed up with Wheel of Fortune legend Pat Sajak in 2004 to create Pat Sajak Games, an online gaming site. Together, they created Pat Sajak's Lucky Letters, Pat Sajak's Trivia Gems, Pat Sajak's Code Letters and Pat Sajak's Code Number Sudoku.

In 2006, Hoyt invented two new popular games - USA Today's Word Roundup and USA Today's Up & Down Words. Over the next few years, he created additional variations of Word Roundup that are played by millions online every day.

Hoyt reached a new milestone in his career in 2011, when with Tribune Content Agency and Jeff Knurek, he replaced Mike Argirion as the writer of Jumble, making him the most syndicated puzzle maker in America. In the same year, he partnered with Graeme Thomson and Steve Bullock to co-create David L. Hoyt's Word Winder board game, online game and mobile games. In May 2012, the Word Winder NOOK app was announced the No. 1 board game app on NOOK Apps.

In July 2013, Hoyt launched his newest word game app, Just 2 Words. The app was highly reviewed and well-received, including being named the Corona Labs Inc. App of the Week on July 22, 2013 and App of the Month in July 2013.
