= Pedro Ocón de Oro =

Spanish inventor and author

Pedro Ocón de Oro (Madrid, 1932 – Madrid, 27 June 1999) was a Spanish inventor, author of numerous Spanish-language hobbies. These were published in books, one of which was notably ABC.

== Biography ==
At the age of 16, he won the crossword contest of the Madrid newspaper, and that same year he began to create his own hobbies, a field in which he was prolific in his forty years of dedication to the trade. The oconogram (organizational chart), the cuadrograma, and the transfusion of letters were also his creations.

His creations were published in numerous Spanish and Latin American newspapers, as well as in the four publications he himself directed: Pasatiempos de Oro (1958), Crucigramas Oconoro (1968), Sopa de letras (1976) and Juegoramas.

His daughters Chelo and Paloma have continued their work to this day.
