= George Clark (cartoonist) =

American cartoonist (1902–1981)

George Rife Clark (August 22, 1902 – May 25, 1981) was an American cartoonist best known for his syndicated cartoon panels The Neighbors and Side Glances. For both, Clark employed a loose, naturalistic drawing style to illustrate minor human foibles and familiar family situations. In the mid-1930s, George Jean Nathan's The American Spectator commented, "Clark, creator of Side Glances, deserves unqualified recognition for a penetrating picture of our middle class."

George Clark and two of his Side Glances panels in 1934.

== Career ==
Born in the Oklahoma Territory when it was not yet a state, Clark went to grammar school in Bridgeport, Oklahoma and spent a few years in Bentonville, Arkansas before attending high school in Oklahoma City, followed by study at the Chicago Art Institute.

He began his professional cartoon career with work in The Daily Oklahoman and the Oklahoma News, moving on to the Cleveland Press. Competing against 72 artists, he won the $500 first prize for Community Fund drive with a poster selected for use in 42 American cities. Soon he was doing animation drawings for The Gumps and illustrating for Collier's, Judge, McCall's and Country Gentleman.

He joined the art staff at Newspaper Enterprise Association, where he drew human interest sketches. His Side Glances cartoon became popular when it was syndicated by NEA Service in 1929. During its early years, NEA promoted the panel by highlighting its human interest appeal: "It has been said before of George Clark that 'he combines splendid art ability with the characteristics of a trained reporter.' It is hard to improve on that appraisal. Certainly these intimate little views of humanity he calls Side Glances are a happy blend of keen observation and understanding and of genuine art. They have humor and pathos; often a tear lurks just behind the smile—which, after all, is the way of life."

In 1939, William Galbraith Crawford (who always signed simply "Galbraith") took over Side Glances when Clark switched to the Chicago Tribune-New York Daily News Syndicate to launch The Neighbors. It was almost identical to Side Glances, continuing to offer essentially the same sort of middle-class family humor. He soon added a Sunday strip, Our Neighbors, the Ripples, a title eventually shortened to The Ripples. The Sunday strip was dropped in 1948, but his daily panel continued until 1971. Stephen Becker (Comic Art in America) commented, "He has never attempted to induce the belly laugh; he feels that a gently humorous reminder of something that has probably happened to his reader will suffice."

== Awards and exhibitions ==
He received the National Cartoonists Society's Newspaper Panel Cartoon Award in 1961. At the NCS site, a computer glitch or clerical error has mistakenly positioned a biography billboard for another artist named Clark in George Clark's niche.

In 1972, Clark's work was included in the Brooklyn Museum's "A Century of American Illustration" exhibition.

Clark died May 25, 1981, and was buried in Saint Charles Cemetery on Long Island, New York.
