= Jumble =

American word puzzle syndicated in daily newspapers

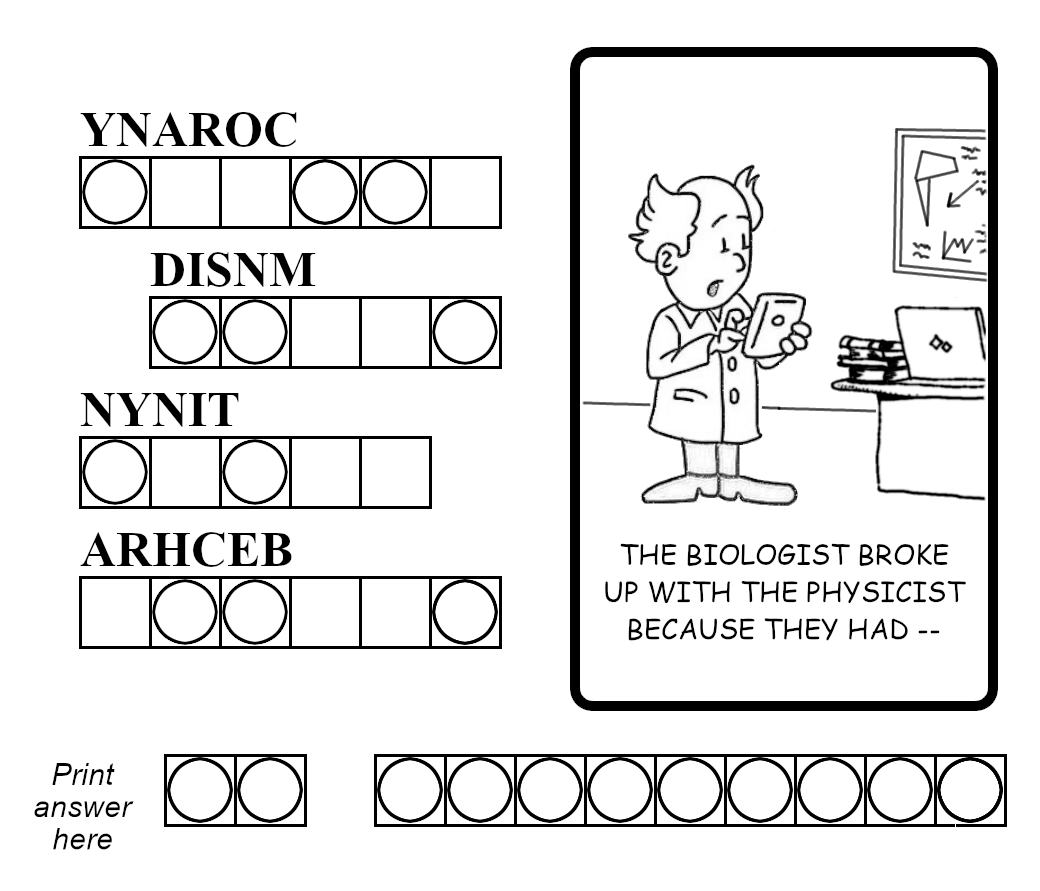
An example Jumble-style puzzle

Jumble is a word puzzle with a clue, a drawing illustrating the clue, and a set of words, each of which is “jumbled” by scrambling its letters. A solver reconstructs the words, and then arranges letters at marked positions in the words to spell the answer phrase to the clue. The clue, and sometimes the illustration, provide hints about the answer phrase, which frequently uses a homophone or pun.

Jumble was created in 1954 by Martin Naydel, who was better known for his work on comic books. It originally appeared under the title "Scramble." Henri Arnold and Bob Lee took over the feature in 1962 and continued it for at least 30 years. As of 2025, Jumble is being maintained by David L. Hoyt and Jeff Knurek. Jumble is one of the most valuable properties of its distributor, US company Tribune Content Agency, which owns the JUMBLE trademarks and copyrights. Daily and Sunday Jumble puzzles appear in over 600 newspapers in the United States and internationally.

The current syndicated version found in most daily newspapers (under the official title Jumble--That Scrambled Word Game) has four base anagrams, two of five letters and two of six, followed by a clue and a series of blank spaces into which the answer to the clue fits. The answer to the clue is generally a pun of some sort. A weekly "kids version" of the puzzle features a three-letter word plus three four-letter words. In order to find the letters that are in the answer to the given clue, the player must unscramble all four of the scrambled words; the letters that are in the clue will be circled. The contestant then unscrambles the circled letters to form the answer to the clue. An alternate workaround is to solve some of the scrambled words, figure out the answer to the clue without all the letters, then use the "extra" letters as aids to solve the remaining scrambled words.

There are many variations of puzzles from the Jumble brand including Jumble, Jumble for Kids, Jumble Crosswords, TV Jumble, Jumble BrainBusters, Jumble BrainBusters Junior, Hollywood Jumble, Jumble Jong, Jumble Word Vault, Jumpin' Jumble, Jumble Solitaire, and Jumble Word Web.

== Versions in other media ==
In addition to being playable online through various interactive online platforms such as on Tribune Content Agency's Web site in an HTML 5 implementation, Jumble is downloadable through several mobile game applications such as Apple's iTunes, AT&T and on the Amazon Kindle.

In 2010, Jumble Madness was developed by Anino Entertainment and published by Destineer for the Nintendo DS.

As of 2012, Jumble books were published by Andrews McMeel Publishing, Triumph Books, and Tyndale House Publishers.

Jumble is also available as a Bicycle playing card by United States Playing Card Company with an assortment of game titles such as "3-4-5," "Jumble Word Meld," and "Jumble Solitaire."

A TV show based on Jumble aired in 1994. It was hosted by game show veteran Wink Martindale, and aired on The Family Channel (now called Freeform).

== Computerized solutions ==
Algorithms have been designed to solve Jumbles, using a dictionary. Common algorithms work by printing all words that can be formed from a set of letters. The solver then chooses the right word. A dictionary of such anagrams may be used to solve puzzles or verify that a jumbled word is unique when creating puzzles.

First algorithm:

1. Begin
2. Input: J, all the jumbled letters that form an unknown W word(s)
3. Sort the letters of J in alphabetical order, preserving duplicates
4. Look up sorted letters in a hash table, initialised with a dictionary, that maps a sorted set of letters to unscrambled words
5. Print the set of words, which is W
6. End

Second algorithm:

1. Begin
2. Input: J, all the jumbled letters that form an unknown W word(s)
3. Frame a word list Y with all permutations of J
4. For each word in Y check if the word is existing in the dictionary
5. If a match is found then collect it in word list W
6. Print the words in W
7. End

Algorithm to find the permutations of J:

1. Begin
2. Initialize a string with first character of J denoted by J(1)
3. Add the second character of J denoted by J(2) on either side of J(1) to get two strings
  - J(1)J(2)
  - J(2)J(1)
4. Add the third character of J denoted by J(3) on either side and in between the above 2 strings to get 6 strings
  - J(1)J(2)J(3)
  - J(1)J(3)J(2)
  - J(3)J(1)J(2)
  - J(2)J(1)J(3)
  - J(2)J(3)J(1)
  - J(3)J(2)J(1)
5. In the same way add J(4) to each of the above strings in either sides and between two characters to get 24 strings
6. Continue this until all the characters are completed

Douglas Hofstadter developed a program called Jumbo that tries to solve Jumble problems as a human mind would. The program does not rely on a dictionary and does not try to find real English words, but rather words that could be English, exploiting a database of plausibilities for various combinations of letters. Letters are combined non-deterministically, following a strategy inspired by chemical reactions and free associations.

== See also ==
- Jumble (British game show)
- Metapuzzle
