= The Last Decathlon =

1970s thriller novel

- First edition
- Author: John Redgate
- Language: English
- Publisher: Delacorte Books
- Publication date: 1979
- ISBN: 0440146437
- OCLC: 005101594

The Last Decathlon is a novel about the Soviet Union by John Redgate that takes place in the 1980s. It was published in October 1979 by Delacorte Books. The book tells the story about the conditions that would eventually lead to the dissolution of the Soviet Union. There is espionage along with some adventure and sports scenes.

== Plot ==
Chad Norris becomes the track and field star for the United States and appears at the 1980 Summer Olympics in Moscow, U.S.S.R.. Every time Norris gets interviewed by the popular press, he becomes suspicious and tells tall tales.

When the opening ceremonies come about, he disappears and blends with the locals. This young athlete turns out to be Dale Richardson; who had his father wrongfully accused of working for an American spy network and serving time at Lubyanka Prison. The athlete/spy and the young Russian peasant try to elude the authorities and eventually arrive at their destination.
