= Bundan =

In Japanese literature, the Bundan (文壇, Bundan) is a term used to refer to a "system" of literary cliques and coteries that allow small in-groups of established authors, critics, and publishers to selectively advance the careers of favored protégés by controlling access to publication in prestigious literary magazines and dominating the selection committees for prestigious literary prizes such as the Akutagawa Prize. The Bundan has also been described as an "unofficial literary guild."

The Bundan focuses on highbrow literary fiction (純文学 jun bungaku, literally "pure literature"), and generally does not concern itself with middlebrow or genre fiction (大衆文学 taishū bungaku, literally "literature for the masses"). Not all authors join the Bundan, but many aspiring authors feel compelled to do so in order to advance their careers. Authors who became independently famous without the patronage of established authors have generally remained aloof; examples of well-known authors not connected to the Bundan include Natsume Sōseki and Mori Ōgai in the early 20th century and Haruki Murakami in more recent years.

Equivalent terms exist to describe networks of well-connected insiders in the world of fine art (画壇 gadan), poetry (詩壇 shidan), music (楽壇 gakudan), and the business world (財界 zaikai).

== History ==
The term "Bundan" was first coined in the Meiji Period by writer and critic Tsubouchi Shōyō to describe the unity and cohesion of the Ken'yūsha literary society as it successfully lobbied for and controlled publications of literary works in the Yomiuri Shimbun newspaper. In the early 20th century, the Bundan played an important role in protecting writers' intellectual property rights and pressuring publishers to pay authors decent prices for stories they published. In the 1920s, prominent publisher Kikuchi Kan was widely recognized as the head of the Bundan, and helped institutionalize its structure by patronizing various literary cliques and establishing important literary prizes including the Akutagawa Prize and the Naoki Prize.

The Bundan remained prominent well into the postwar period. However, a series of fierce political debates within the Bundan, collectively known as the Politics and Literature Debates, weakened its cohesion, and many leading literary critics agreed that the Bundan system "collapsed" around the time of the contentious Anpo protests in 1960 against the U.S.-Japan Security Treaty, which had exacerbated disagreements among writers about the appropriate role of literature in society.

Nevertheless, the term "Bundan" did not fall out of use, and is still used to describe informal networks of literary insiders in the Japanese literature scene today.
