= Stanley Link =

American cartoonist

Stanley Link (1894 - December 24, 1957) was an American cartoonist and comics artist, best known for Tiny Tim.

Link took a correspondence course in cartooning when he was a teenager. When he was sixteen, he began to work with an animation company. In the early 1920s, he became Sidney Smith's assistant. He launched the panel Ching Chow in 1927. In 1933, he created his own strip, Tiny Tim. He also created the family strip The Dailys. Link died in 1957.
