= Tom Forman (cartoonist) =

American cartoonist (1936–1996)

- Born: May 2, 1936 Detroit, Michigan, U.S.
- Died: May 18, 1996 (aged 60) Agoura Hills, California, U.S.
- Areas: Cartoonist, Writer
- Notable works: Motley's Crew

Tom Forman (May 2, 1936 – May 18, 1996) was an American comic strip cartoonist. Born in Detroit, Michigan, he graduated with a bachelor's degree in government from California State University, Los Angeles.

== Career ==
He is best known as the co-creator of the classic comic strip Motley's Crew along with Ben Templeton. His pre-1997 take on the comic strip involved Mike Motley's career as a blue-collar worker, sports, and his friends.

== Legacy ==
After Forman died of cancer, the storylines of the comic strip he helped create became more feminine and had "touchy-feely" parts at various points in the storyline. They dealt with being forced to say "hi" to the in-laws under embarrassing circumstances, attending various weddings, and letting out bottled emotions. This new spin on the comic strip alienated many older male viewers, and may have led to its retirement on January 1, 2000.
