= Net and wall games =

Court games separated by a net or wall

Net and wall games are court games where either a net separates the opponents or a wall serves to reflect the ball to the opponent. The object of these games is to hit or throw the ball or bird over the net (direct style) or against the wall (indirect style) back to the opponent. Play typically begins with one side serving the ball/bird by initially tossing or releasing it and then hitting/throwing it over the net or to the wall. This then starts a rally, in which the sides alternate hitting/throwing the ball/bird. Players then score points whenever the opponent fails to return the ball/bird back. The criteria on what is considered a valid return varies between each sport (such as the number of times the ball may be touched or bounced on a player's side before it must go back). Games in this category are non contact sports.

== Examples ==
Sports like Real tennis, Padel and Wallyball use both net and walls. On the contrary, some sports like Four square, Ballon au poing, Tamburello and Crossminton have the same logic of wall and net games, even they do not use any of them.

The Los Angeles Daily Times reports: "Net sports are unique in that the equipment is light, portable and affordable, and partners and opponents are easy to find. The sports are easy to learn, and the social aspect of the game[s] appeals to those who find the health club to be an isolationist palace of mirrors."

Net and wall games usually include:

- racquet sports such as tennis, badminton, pickleball, table tennis, squash, racquetball.
- volleyball, crossnet, footvolley, Jokgu, headis, roundnet, American handball, Throwball or sepak takraw, where players must hit/throw the ball with the body.
- Some sports like Basque pelota include both the use of hands and the use of equipment depending on the discipline.

The three most popular net and wall games (tennis, badminton, and volleyball) usually involve arching of the back when serving or spiking/smashing the ball or birdie.

Although basketball, hockey, water polo, Football and other sports have netting around the goal area designed to more clearly indicate when goals are scored, they are not considered "net games", since the net is not used to separate the teams involved. Similarly, lacrosse sticks have a loose netting that is used to catch and fling the ball, but again lacrosse is not considered a "net game".

== Comparison ==
Sport		Image	Country of origin	Governing Body	Number of players	Type of ball	Style	What it is allowed to play with		Allowed form for returning the ball	What divides turns	Allowed service form	Number of touches before return	Maximum number of bounces allowed before return	Scoring
Sport		Image	Country of origin	Governing Body	Number of players	Type of ball	Style	Body	Equipment	Allowed form for returning the ball	What divides turns	Allowed service form	Number of touches before return	Maximum number of bounces allowed before return	Scoring
Volleyball	Indoor		United States	FIVB	6	Inflatable	Direct	Any part	-	Hitting	Net	Overarm, underarm	Up to three (excluding touch by failing block), not successively by the same player	None	Points, sets
Volleyball	Snow		Austria	FIVB	3	Inflatable	Direct	Any part	-	Hitting	Net	Overarm, underarm	Up to three (excluding touch by failing block), not successively by the same player	None	Points, sets
Volleyball	Beach		United States	FIVB	2	Inflatable	Direct	Any part	-	Hitting	Net	Overarm, underarm	Up to three, not successively by the same player	None	Points, sets
Volleyball	Beach 4x4			FIVB	4	Inflatable	Direct	Any part	-	Hitting	Net	Overarm, underarm	Up to three, not successively by the same player	None	Points, sets
Sepak takraw			Southeast Asia	ISTAF	3	Hollow woven	Direct	Except upper limbs	-	Hitting	Net	Volley kick	Up to three (maximum of 2 successive by same player)	None	Points, sets
Fistball			Italy	IFA	5	Inflatable	Direct	Upper limbs	-	Hitting	Elevated rope	Overarm, underarm	Up to three, by different players	Up to 1 before each player touch	Points, sets
Throwball			India	International Throwball Federation	7	Inflatable	Direct	Hand	-	Throwing	Net	Overarm	1	None	Points, sets
Teqball			Hungary	FITEQ	Singles: 1; Doubles: 2	Inflatable	Direct	Except upper limbs	-	Hitting	Net	On flight	Up to three	1 on table (no volley allowed)	Points, sets
Tchoukball			Switzerland	International Tchoukball Federation	7	Inflatable	Indirect	Except below knee	-	Throwing	Rebounder		Up to three passes	None on floor	Points
Tennis	Lawn		England	ITF	Singles: 1; Doubles: 2	Filled with air, non inflatable	Direct	-	Racquet	Hitting	Net	Overarm, underarm	1	1	Points, games, sets
Tennis	Beach		Italy	ITF	Singles: 1; Doubles: 2	Filled with air, non inflatable	Direct	-	Racquet	Hitting	Net	Overarm, underarm	1	None	Points, games, sets
Badminton			England	BWF	Singles: 1; Doubles: 2	Shuttle	Direct	-	Racquet	Hitting	Net	Racquet pointing downward	1	None	Points, games
Pickleball			United States		Singles: 1; Doubles: 2	Hollow	Direct	-	Racquet	Hitting	Net	Ball must bounce past opponent no volley zone	1	1	Points, games
Table tennis			England	ITTF	Singles: 1; Doubles: 2	Filled with air, non inflatable	Direct	-	Racquet	Hitting	Net	Two mandatory bounces (first on own court and the other on the opponent one)	1	1 on table (no volley allowed)	Points, games
Squash			England	World Squash	Singles: 1; Doubles: 2	Filled with air, non inflatable	Indirect	-	Racquet	Hitting	Wall		1	1 on floor	Points, games
Crossminton			Germany	International Crossminton Organisation	Singles: 1; Doubles: 2	Shuttle	Direct	-	Racquet	Hitting	Lines on floor		1	None	Points, sets
One wall			Compromise rules among folk games	CIJB	Singles: 1; Doubles: 2		Indirect	Hand	-	Hitting	Wall		1	1 on floor	Points, sets
International			Compromise rules among folk games	CIJB	Men: 5; Women: 4	Filled with air, non inflatable	Direct		-	Hitting	Line on floor		1		Points, games
Valencian pilota	Llargues		Spain	CIJB	5	Solid	Direct	Upper limbs for returning; Any part for blocking	-	Hitting	Line on floor; Imaginary movable line on floor (rattles)	On flight	1	None after rest line; 1 if bounces between fault and rest lines; Unlimited if first bounce is before fault line	Points, games
Valencian pilota	Frontó		Spain	CIJB	2	Solid	Indirect	Upper limbs	-	Hitting	Wall		1	1 on floor	Points
Basque pelota	Frontball		Spain	FIPV	1	Filled with air, non inflatable	Indirect	Hand	-	Hitting	Wall		1	1 on floor	Points, games
Basque pelota	Frontenis		Mexico	FIPV	Singles: 1; Doubles: 2	Filled with air, non inflatable	Indirect	-	Racquet	Hitting	Wall		1	1 on floor	Points, games
Basque pelota	Jai alai		Spain	FIPV	Singles: 1; Doubles: 2	Solid	Indirect	-	Xistera	Throwing	Wall		1	1 on floor	Points, games
Basque pelota	Xare		Spain	FIPV	2	Solid	Indirect	-	Xare	Throwing	Wall		1	1 on floor	Points, games
Padbol			Argentina	International Federation of Padbol Associates	2	Inflatable	Direct and indirect	Except upper limbs	-	Hitting	Net and wall	Kick after bounce	Minimum 2, maximum 3 (not successively by the same player)	1 on floor	Points, games, sets
Padel			Mexico	FIP	2	Filled with air, non inflatable	Direct and indirect	-	Racquet	Hitting	Net and wall	Underarm	1	1 on floor (no volley allowed)	Points, games, sets
