= Tiny Tim (comic strip) =

American comic strip by Stanley Link

- Author: Stanley Link
- Current status/schedule: Concluded
- Launch date: October 4, 1931
- End date: March 2, 1958

Tiny Tim was an American Sunday strip created by Stanley Link. It ran from October 4, 1931, to March 2, 1958. It also ran as a daily strip from April 17, 1933 to October 20, 1934. It followed the adventures of Tim Grunt and his sister Dotty, both only two inches tall at the start of the strip. However, they grew six inches during the first three months. After that, they were taken in by a farm couple.

Eventually, a gypsy grew them to slightly less than normal size, and Dotty disappeared. On April 13, 1941, the gypsy gave Tim an amulet that said "Nemesis of All Evil". By saying the words out loud, Tim could return to being two inches tall, then grow back to normal size. In 1957, Link died, and on March 2, 1958, the strip ended. Tiny Tim was once popular, but has since faded into obscurity.
