= The Neighbors (comic strip) =

American comic strip by George Clark

The Neighbors was an American gag-a-day comic strip, created by George Clark, which ran from April 24, 1939 to 1976.

Clark launched The Neighbors in 1939 with the Chicago Tribune-New York Daily News Syndicate. Similar to his earlier Side Glances (1928-1939), it explored subtle aspects of middle-class family humor. He soon added a Sunday strip, Our Neighbors, the Ripples, a title eventually shortened to The Ripples (1939-1948). The Sunday strip was dropped in 1948, but his daily panel continued until 1971.

Stephen Becker (Comic Art in America) commented, "He has never attempted to induce the belly laugh; he feels that a gently humorous reminder of something that has probably happened to his reader will suffice."

== Awards ==
Clark received the National Cartoonists Society's Newspaper Panel Cartoon Award in 1961.
