= Ben Templeton =

American cartoonist

- Born: c. 1940
- Areas: Cartoonist, Writer, Artist
- Notable works: Motley's Crew

Ben Templeton (born c. 1940) is the co-creator of the classic comic strip Motley's Crew along with his late partner Tom Forman. After the death of his partner, Templeton completed the strip on its own until its cancellation on January 1, 2000. As of 2007, Ben Templeton is semi-retired.
