= Roundnet =

Ball game

Roundnet (spikeball)
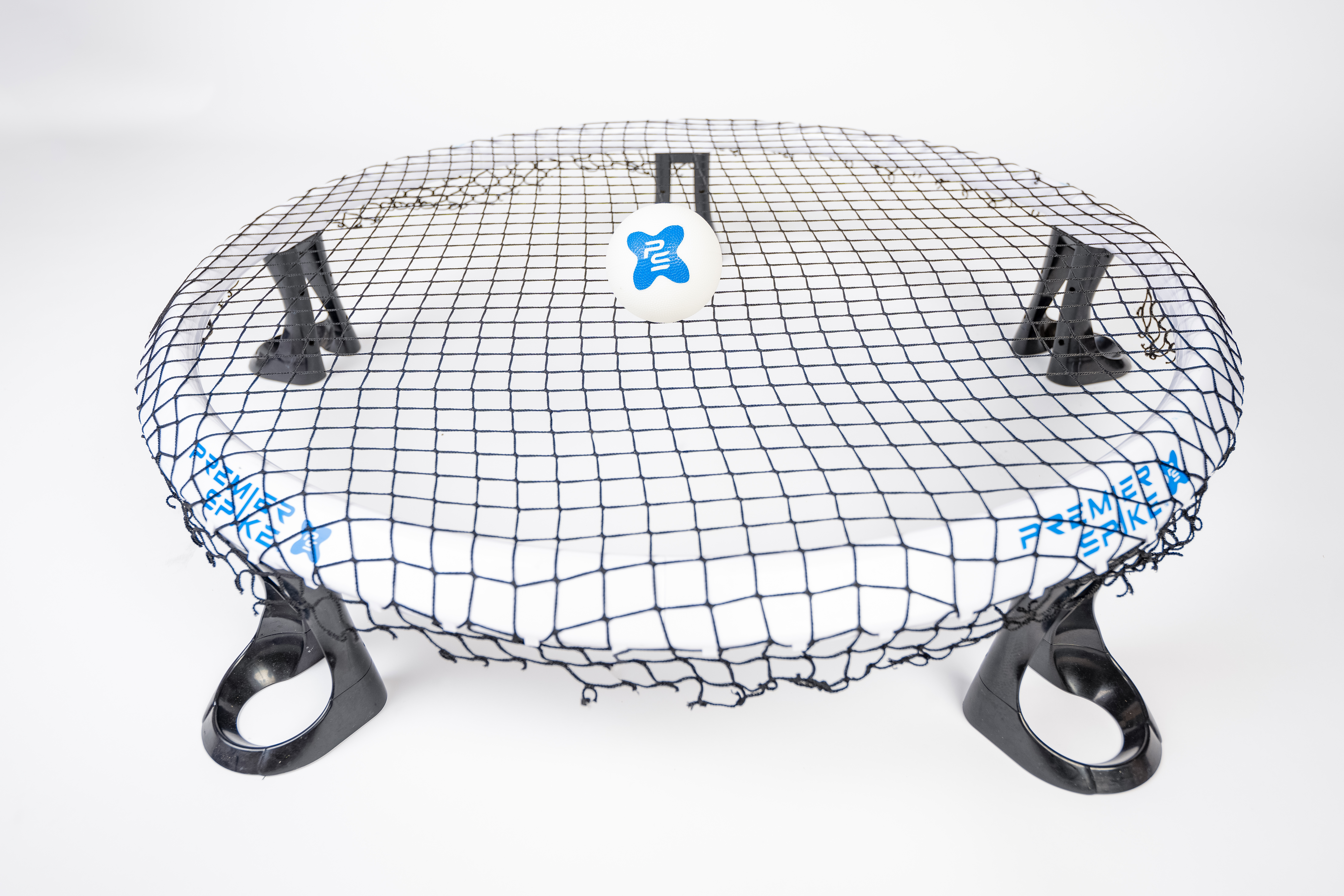
- Highest governing body: International Roundnet Federation
- Nicknames: Spikeball
- First played: 1989

Characteristics
- Contact: Yes
- Team members: 2
- Mixed-sex: Yes
- Type: Indoor or outdoor, net and wall game

Roundnet (also known as spikeball) is a ball game created in 1989 by Jeff Knurek, inspired primarily by concepts from volleyball. The game is played between two teams, usually with two players each. At the start of a point, players line up around a small trampoline-like net and serve from one team to another. Teams alternate hitting the ball back to the net.

Roundnet experienced a revival in 2008 when Spikeball Inc. began manufacturing and promoting its roundnet equipment, with "spikeball" becoming a common name for the game.. There are now several more suppliers of Roundnet equipment.

== International Roundnet Federation ==
=== Members ===
There are 44 nations as of July 2025.

- Europe: 24
- Americas: 9
- Asia: 7
- Africa: 2
- Oceania: 1

=== World Championship ===
The first world championships were held in 2019.

== Basics ==
Roundnet features elements from sports such as volleyball. The game is played between two teams. Two people per team for 2v2 games, or teams have 3 people for 3v3 games. For 2v2 games, players are positioned at 4 points around the net, with partners located at neighboring positions. For 3v3 games, players are positioned at 6 points around the net, with members from each team alternating positions so that each team is in a triangle formation. One player serves the ball directly across the net to the opposing team member. The opposing team then has 3 hits to return the ball to the net. If it is a 3v3 game then the team has 4 hits to return the ball to the net After the serve, there are no boundaries of play. Participants are free to run, set, and spike the ball from anywhere around the net. Play continues until a team fails to return the ball or the ball hits a rim piece, at which point the point ends, and the other team receives 1 point.

== Rules ==
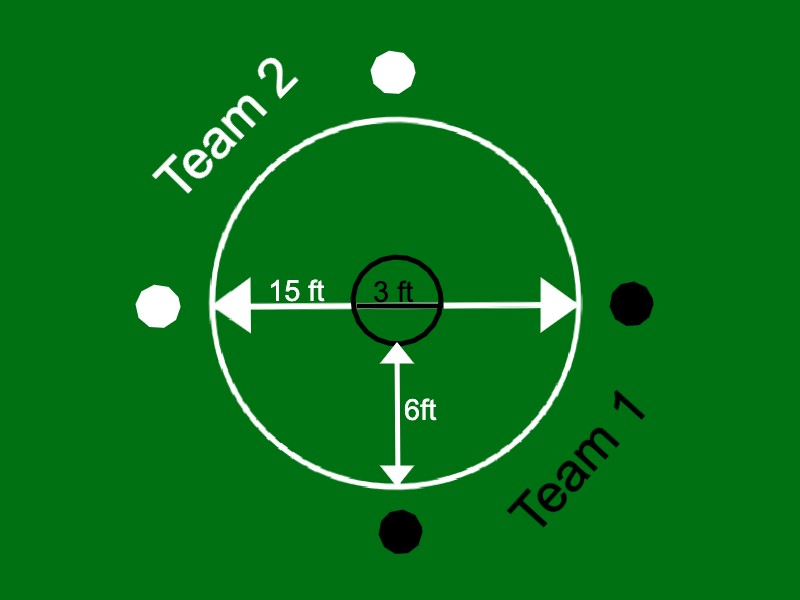
Roundnet court, a serving circle with a diameter of 15ft, the 3ft net is placed in the middle, making the serving circle 6ft away from the net. Also an example of how the teams are set up.

The bouncing ball has a 12-inch circumference with a diameter of approximately 3.8-inches.

=== Setup ===
Materials needed for roundnet include a trampoline-like net, and a small ball with a 12-inch circumference. For 2v2 games, players line up in a square around the net with their partner to one side, and a member of the opposing team on the other. Each partner is ninety degrees away from the next player. Before the point starts, players will always be across the net from an opponent and next to their teammate. For 3v3 games, players line up in a hexagon shape around the net with players from each team alternative positions, so that each team starts in a triangle formation and each player is directly across and flanked on either side from the opposing team. Thus, each player is 60 degrees away from the next player and 120 degrees away from their teammates. This triangle formation is held until the ball is served.

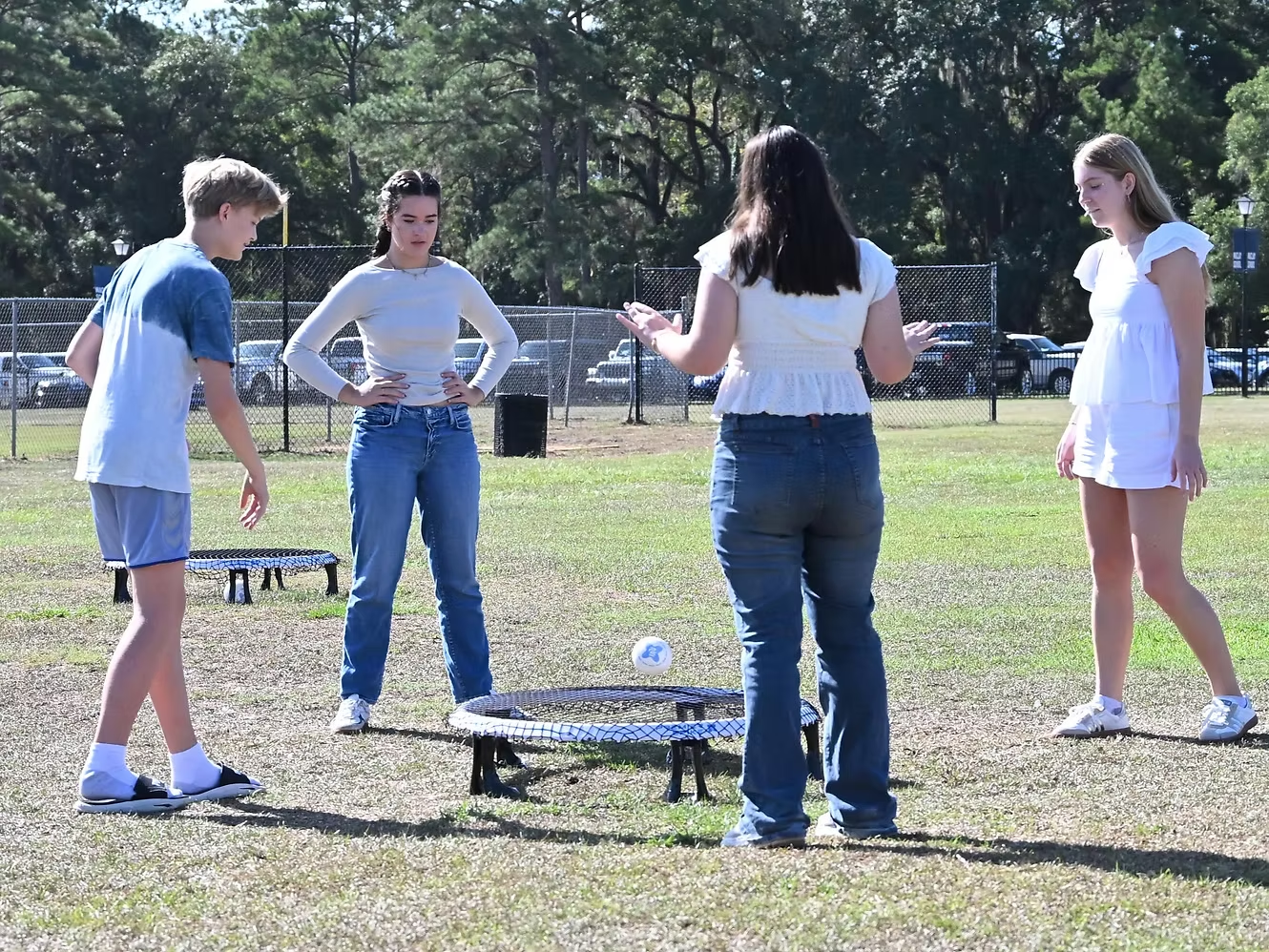
2v2 game of Roundnet

Each point begins with a serve, usually done by the team who won the previous point. To determine who serves first in the match, teams will participate in a game of rock paper scissors, a coin flip or an odd/even call. The winning team receives the option to serve first or receive first. During the serve, all players who are not receiving the serve have to line up in their designated positions outside of 7 feet from their section of the rim (8.5 feet from the center of the net). The returner can stand wherever they want prior to the serve.

Once the ball is struck, all players on both teams can move wherever they may like. After the ball is served, the possession is assumed by the returning team. Once the ball is hit and returned by the non-serving team and hits the net, the possession is flipped. This continues throughout the point, as possession changes whenever the ball hits the net. During each possession, teams have three hits but do not have to use all of their hits.

To account for harsh sunlight, wind, or any other condition outside of the game, players will rotate serving positions ninety degrees every five points. Only a maximum of three touches are allowed.

=== Serving ===
The first serve starts the game, and the setup is dictated by the first receiver. The server then stands directly across from the receiver, and only the designated receiver may receive the serve. To serve, the server must throw the ball at least 4 inches away from the release point to begin the serve. The ball is not allowed to be interfered with during the serve.

For each point, the server is allowed two serves to complete a legal serve. If they catch, swing at and miss, or drop the tossed ball, it results in a service fault. Servers must be behind the seven-foot line away from the net to be eligible for the play. The server cannot lean over the line in order to get closer to the net, and their feet and entire body must be behind the line until the ball is contacted. The server is allowed to take a pivot step, but cannot move further than a pivot. The server can hit the ball at any speed and direction including drop shots. For the serve to be eligible, the ball must not go any higher than the receiver's shoulder. If the ball completely passes over the receiver's shoulder without any contact, the receivers must call fault before a second touch occurs or the ball hits the ground. The serving team will have one more try to serve it correctly, or they lose the point. When serving, if the ball hits what is known as a "pocket" (the area of the net that is right next to the rim) then the receiving team can call a fault and the server can attempt another serve. If the ball comes in contact with the rim at any point of the game while a player attempts to hit the net, that is a point for the opposing team. If a fault is not called, then the play continues. If two faults occur back to back, the receiving team is awarded the point and possession switches sides. If the serving team wins the point, the server must switch places with their teammate to serve to the other receiver. If the receiving team wins the point, they get to serve the next point.

=== Contacting the ball ===
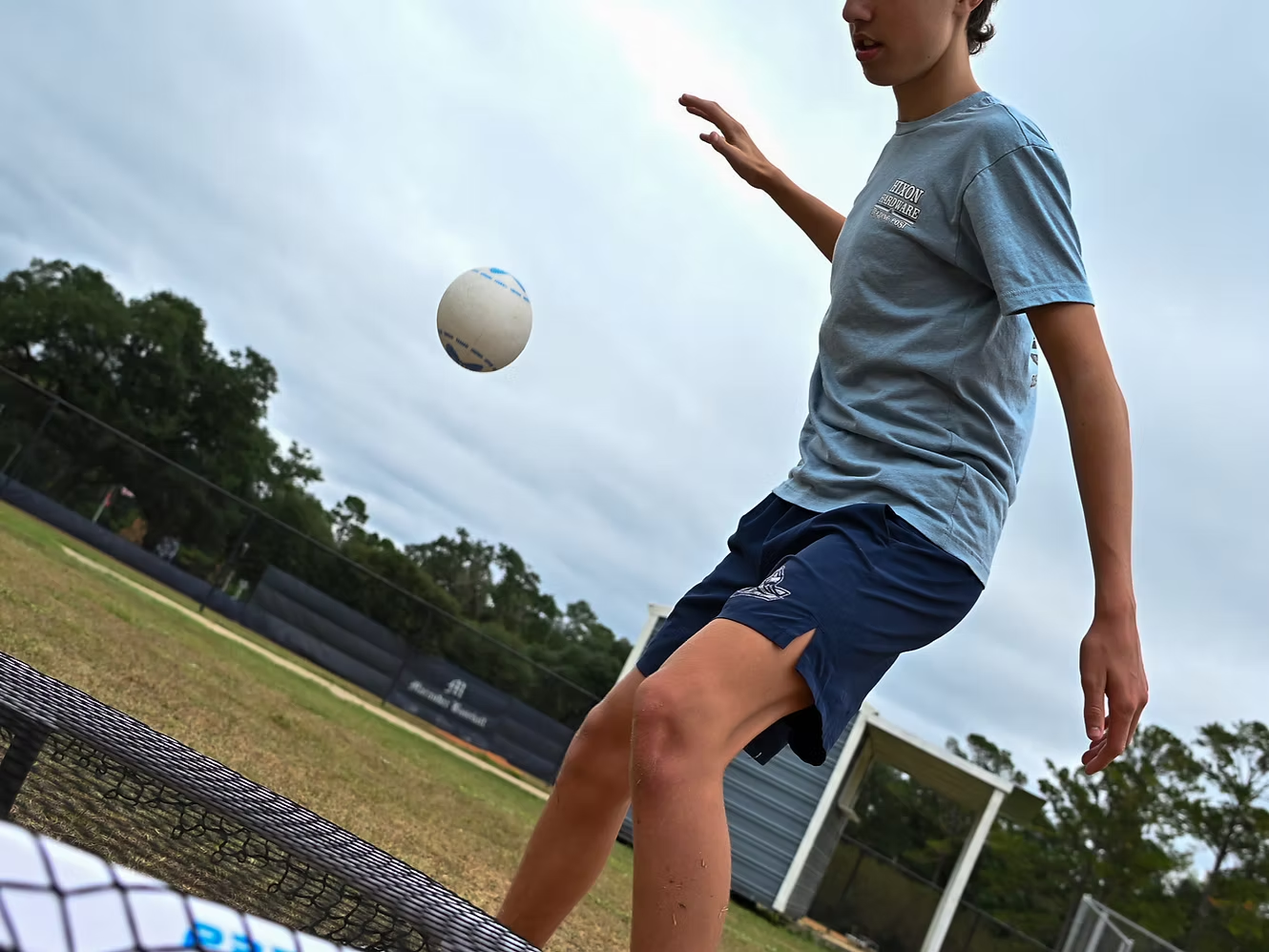
Ball is in play

Rules and regulations exist when the ball is in play. If a player contacts the ball on its trajectory upward, a soft touch can be made. A soft touch allows the same player to hit the ball a second time in a row, if the first touch is on an upward path. This second touch however does indeed count for 2/3 of the max touches by a team, and the next hit must go on the net. When a player is hitting the ball, no more than a slight carry is allowed by SRA. Any catch of the ball results in a point for the opposing team. If the ball hits the ground or the rim at any point during the rally, the play ends and a point is given to the other team. If the teams could not determine whether the ball hit the rim or a pocket, the play is replayed. When the ball hits the net, it must clear the rim for the play to be continued. If the ball hits the net again, a double bounce is called, and a point is given to the assuming receiving team. If during a rally the ball hits the pocket, the rally continues. Pockets are only a fault during serves. If the ball makes contact with the net and then proceeds to roll up into the rim, this is known as a "roll-up". If this occurs during a service, the receiving team may call a fault and the service is tried again. If a roll-up occurs during a rally, it is treated as a pocket, and the rally continues.

Infractions exist even if a team does not have assumed possession, these are called hinders. These include if a defensive player gets in the way of the team going for the ball. It is required that defensive players make an effort to get out of the way to avoid interference. If a player gets in the way of the play, the opposing team must call it "hinder". They will then be able to replay the point. The offensive team must have a legitimate reason to call "hinder". If the defensive player makes an attempt to play at the ball if they do not have possession, they lose the point. If a player hits a shot that hits off the net and hits either themselves or their teammate, they lose the point. If a player makes contact with the set, it results in the loss of the point. Even if the player hit a "kill shot", they will lose the point if they touch the set before the ball makes contact with the ground.

=== Scoring ===
Scoring in roundnet is dictated by "rally scoring", meaning that a team may earn a point whether they are serving or not. Games are usually played from 11, 15 or 21 points, but the tournament organizer can change that at his/her discretion. As is common with similar games such as ping-pong, tennis, and volleyball, teams can only win by two points. This can lead to deuces and point-advantages until a team wins by 2 points. Points can be scored in these ways:

- When the ball does not hit the net within three hits during a possession.
- The ball hits the ground.
- The ball hits the rim (this includes during serves).
- The ball does not bounce off the net on a single bounce, also known as a double hit. The ball must clear the rim of the net completely.
- There are two illegal serves in a row.
- The player hits themselves or their teammate with the ball after it makes contact with the net.

=== Modified rules ===
In addition to the original, classic way of playing roundnet, there are many variations that can be made to the rules of the game, some of which have become more popular. These modifications can add a complete different aspect to a simple game of roundnet, and in doing so transform the game as a whole. Adding extra aspects to the game allows for roundnet players to challenge themselves a little extra, and in doing so either increase or decrease the competitive aspect of such a versatile game like roundnet. Some potential modifications include splitting the play field in half (thus simplifying the game), only using one hand, or something called "Takes two to fwango" which forces players to hold hands greatly increasing the difficulty of the game.

Some more potential game modifications include

- Infinity touches: Each team has an unlimited number of touches per possession.
- Don't mess up: Subtract a certain number of points if either team hits the rim of the net.
- Double Cross: The players trade partners with the opposing team.
- Stranger Things: The players flip the net upside down and play.
- Birds of a feather: The net is elevated.
- Friendly fire: Teams can only win a point when the opposing team mishandles the ball or makes an offensive mistake. Killshots result in a redo of the point.
- Standard 1v1: One player initiates play by serving the ball over the net to their opponent. The receiving player has three attempts to hit the ball back over the net. The round continues until one player is unable to successfully return the ball.

== Skills ==
Many competitive teams and players master these four fundamental skills: serve, pass/dig/set, attack (spike), and the body block. These skills are standard practice for high-level advanced, premier, or pro division players.

=== Serve ===
The server stands behind the 7 foot serving line, in attempt to hit the ball onto the net. The servers objective is to hit a clean serve that results in a bad touch or a possible "ace".

In present-day roundnet, several types of serves are implemented:

- Basic serve: It is used by most beginners, when a player hits the ball with a flat hand giving the ball little to no spin. The basic serve is rarely used in high-level games and tournaments, because of how easy the serve is to receive. It can be performed in any serving stance.
- Topspin/Jam/Backdoor serve: The most commonly used serve in the game of roundnet, it is when the player tosses the ball and hits the ball with top spin, which makes the ball go shooting forward at the receiver. When hit hard this serve can be extremely difficult to receive. This serve can be performed in multiple serving stances.
- Drop serve: Another commonly used serve in the game of roundnet, it is used when the player tosses the ball and hits the ball with a bit of back spin, which results in the ball dropping in-front of the receiver. When the serve is placed properly it can be extremely difficult to defend if the opposing player is further back while receiving the hard driven serves. This serve can be performed in multiple serving stances.
- Cut serve: Used by advanced-level players, the server tosses the ball and hits the ball with side spin and top spin, making the ball bounce off the net wider than expected by the receiver. When this serve is placed on the net with tons of power and spin it can be extremely hard for the receiver to get a touch. This serve can be used in most stances, maybe more difficult for certain stances.
- Reverse-cut serve: Perhaps the most difficult serve to master, the server hits the ball with reverse spin going clockwise (assuming right-handedness) as opposed to a typical cut serve, which spins counterclockwise.

=== Set ===
A pass/dig/set is used to properly receive the opponents serve or any type of hit. To properly handle the serve or hit, the player not only has to prevent it from hitting the ground, but also wants to give their partner a good pass to allow them to create a good set.

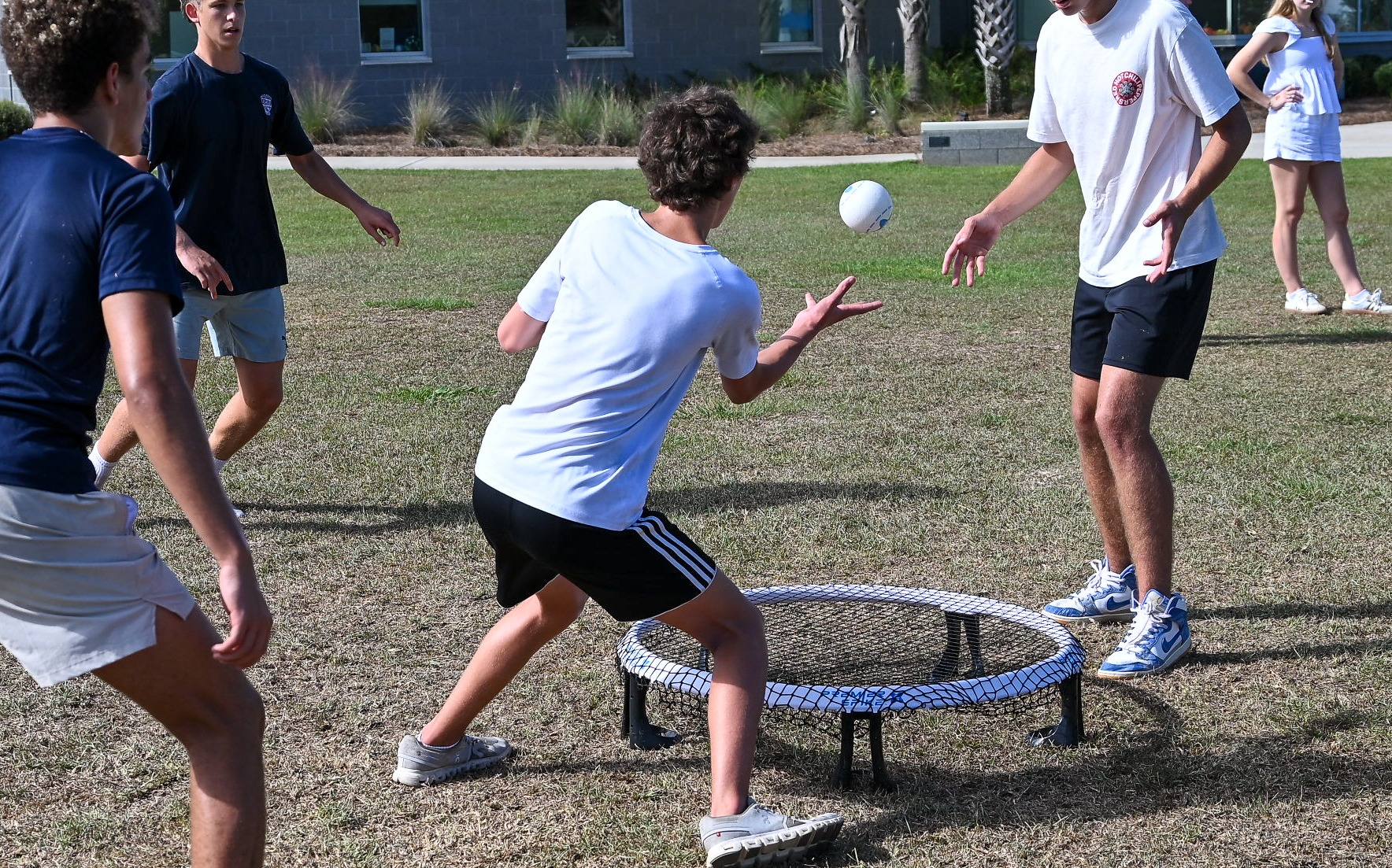
The player "sets" the ball up for his teammate to spike

There are two different techniques used to pass the ball and they can be used in different circumstances:

- Under hand pass: The player makes a platform with their hand for the ball to bounce off the palm of their hand and is most commonly used for setting for a partner.
- Over head pass: Essentially the same contact with the under hand pass, but pushing the ball over head, it is most commonly used when receiving the serve and hard driven hits, long distance setting, or when the ball is traveling over head.

=== Attack (spiking) ===
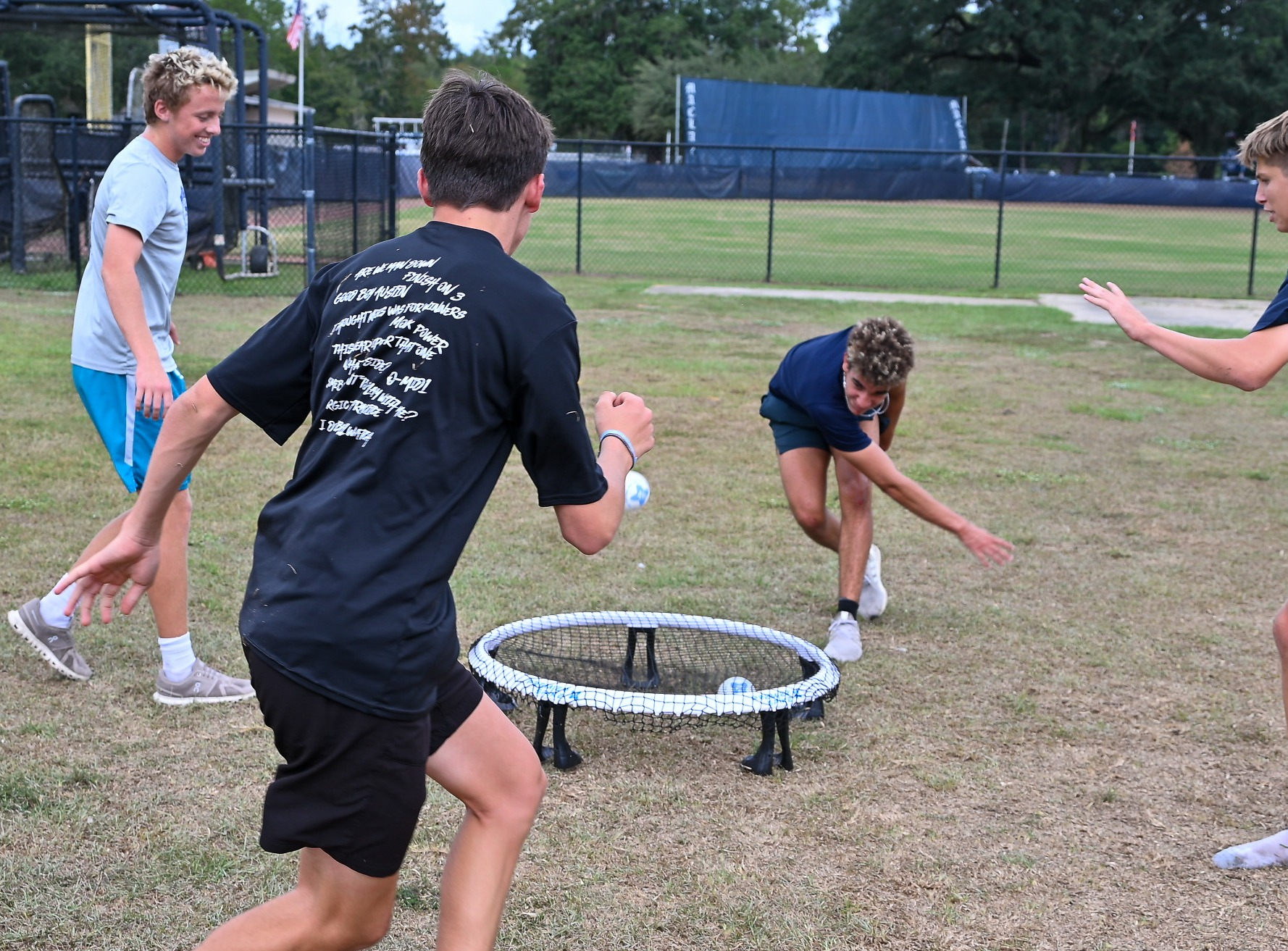
A player attacks with a "spike," a powerful, hard-driven hit

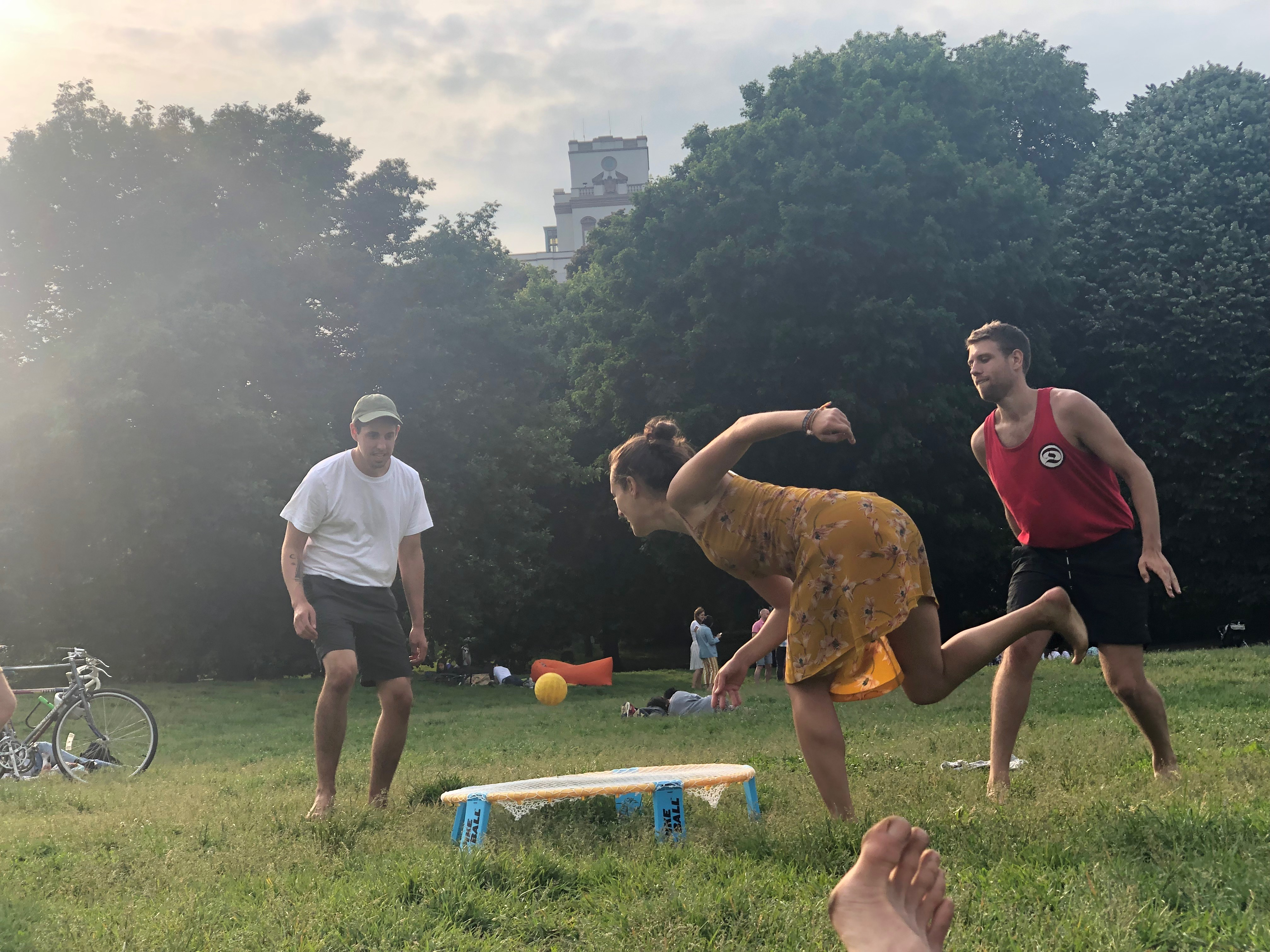
An amateur player shows off the eponymous "spike" of Spikeball.

A hit/flick/chip/drop is used when a player is attacking the ball; it is an attempt to give their opponent a hard hit to defend so they are unable to get the ball back onto the net. Players usually use a combination of wrist snap, arm swing and rotation to deliver certain types of attacks. The main goal of the hitter is to get a "kill", a term used when ball is hit and bounces off the net, and the opposing team could not dig the ball, resulting in a point.

In present-day roundnet there are many different ways to attack the ball:

- Hit (spike): A hard driven hit usually performed with topspin.
- Flick: A very low trajectory shot to place the ball where the defender is not. This is a placement shot. It is typically done with a backhand motion.
- Chorn: A high and far trajectory shot to place the ball overhead of the defender, being unreachable then landing very far away from the net. It is sometimes referred to as a chip or skyball.
- Drop: A low trajectory shot placed in front of the defender, this attack is used with minimal amounts of force.
- Pull: A shot that's trajectory is toward the direction of the hitter.
- Push: A shot that's trajectory is directly in front of the hitter.
- Tweener: A shot delivered from between the hitters legs.

=== No-Hit Zone ===
The No Hit Zone (NHZ) is a rule introduced to roundnet in 2021. The NHZ is a circular area with a radius of 1.5 feet (approximately 45 cm) around the net. Players are not allowed to step into this area while hitting the ball on the final hit of their possession or let their momentum carry them into it immediately after hitting.

Players are permitted to enter the NHZ to bump or set the ball, as long as they are not performing the final hit of their possession. A violation of this rule results in the opposing team being awarded a point. Playing with the NHZ is an official rule of the International Roundnet Federation, but it is ignored by most casual spikeball players.

=== Body block ===
A body block is a common tactic for defence. Where the player defending a hard driven shot, gets hit with ball, passing the ball up to his partner for a set. Body blocks can also be used to block the ball back onto the net, this is referred to a "God-(hand, body, knee, or block etc.)". A "God-block" is when a player uses any part of their body, for example their hand, to deflect the ball back onto the net in one touch usually resulting in a "kill", in this case it would be called a "God-hand".
