= Jeff Knurek =

American cartoonist, industrial designer, and toymaker

Jeff Knurek is an American cartoonist, industrial designer, and toymaker. He is the current cartoonist for the syndicated Jumble puzzle, working with David L. Hoyt.

== Personal life ==
Knurek was born in 1966 Wyandotte, Michigan.

In 2007, Knurek became an organ donor when he donated a kidney to a family member. Knurek and his cousin underwent the transplantation surgery at the University of Michigan Health System’s Transplant Center on July 11, 2007. His cousin suffered from Polycystic kidney disease.

He currently lives in Fishers, Indiana, with his wife Kathy and his children Sydney and Cameron.

== Professional life ==
Knurek graduated from the University of Michigan with a degree in industrial design. In 1989, while working for the I.D.E.A. toy invention studio, his creation Spikeball was marketed by Tomy.

In 2002, Knurek partnered with David L. Hoyt, Tribune Content Agency, and Hasbro to develop the Boggle BrainBuster syndicated daily puzzle.

Knurek is also the inventor of "What's in Ned's Head?" a popular game that has received several parenting awards. Since its creation in 2003, many schools are using this game as a secondary bonus to their classrooms and as an adjunct to speech therapy.

In 2006, he developed Fundex Games's award winning "Monster Under My Bed!"

He worked with Las Vegas magician Mac King to create and market Mac King's "Magic in a Minute" line of children's promotions, toys, magic tricks, videos, books, and events.

Knurek took over as cartoonist for the Jumble in 2008, becoming the third cartoonist the syndicated feature's history. In 2014, he and Hoyt produced the Just Jumble app. He has been a member of the National Cartoonists Society since 2013.
