= List of newspaper comic strips P–Z =

Parent article: List of comic strips; Siblings: A–F • G–O • P–Z

== P ==
- Pääkaupunki (1997– ) by Tarmo Koivisto (Finland)
- Padded Cell (1915–1918) by A. E. Hayward (US)
- The Pajama Diaries (2006–2020) by Terri Libenson (US)
- Pam (1929–1942) by A. W. Brewerton and later S. L. Huntley
- Panda (1946–1991) by Marten Toonder (NL)
- Pardon Our Planet (1996– ), first titled I Need Help, then Pardon My Planet, by Vic Lee (US)
- Pa's Son-in-Law (1924–1941) by Charles H. Wellington
- Patrick (1965–1969) by Malcolm Hancock (US)
- Patsy (see The Adventures of Patsy)
- Pauline McPeril (1966–1969) by Jack Rickard and Mell Lazarus (US)
- Paul Temple (1951–1971) by Francis Durbridge, Alfred Sindall, Bill Bailey and John McNamara (UK)
- Pavlov (1979– ) by Ted Martin
- PC & Pixel (1998– ) by Tak Bui (CAN)
- Peaches, Queen of the Universe, see Eyebeam
- Peanuts (1950–2000) by Charles M. Schulz (US)
- Pearls Before Swine (2001– ) by Stephan Pastis (US)
- Pee Wee (1938–1986) nominally by Jerry Iger
- Pee Wee Harris (1952– ) from Percy Keese Fitzhugh's 1915 series, drawn by Alfred B. Stenzel, then Mike Adair
- Peggy (1946–1960) by Chuck Thurston, and later Art Sansom, Marilyn Troyer, and Elmarine Howard
- Penmen (1996– ) by Gary Blehm (US) – webcomic since 2001
- Penny (1943–1970) by Harry Haenigsen (US)
- Pep (2008–2009) by Curtis Kilfoy
- Pepe (1953–1986), original title Alfredo, by Moco (Denmark)
- Percy and Ferdie (1906–1924), first titled The Hall-Room Boys, by H. A. MacGill
- The Perishers (1959–2006) originally by Dennis Collins and Maurice Dodd (UK)
- The Perils of Submarine Boating by C. W. Kahles
- Perkins (1969–1980) by John Miles
- Perky & Beanz (1985–1987) by Russell Myers (US)
- Perry Mason (1950–1952) by Mel Keefer and Charles Lofgren (US)
- The Pet Set (1977–1978) by Doug Borgstedt and Jean Borgstedt
- Pete and Pinto (1919–1920) by Martin Branner (US)
- Peter Panic (1973– ) by Lo Linkert
- Peter Piltdown (1935–1946) by Mel Eaton
- Peter Rabbit (1924–1955) by Harrison Cady, and others later, including Vincent Fago
- Peter Scratch (1965–1967) by Lou Fine (US)
- Pete the Tramp (1932–1963) by Clarence D. Russell
- Petey Dink, first named Gink and Dink (1908–1930) by Charles Voight (US)
- Petting Patty (1929–1930) by Jefferson Machamer
- The Phantom (1936– ) originally by Lee Falk and Ray Moore, currently by Tony DePaul and Mike Manley (US)
- Phil Fumble (1932–1938) by Ernie Bushmiller (US)
- Phillip's Flock (1968–1985) by Doc Goodwin
- Phoebe and Her Unicorn (2012– ) by Dana Simpson (originally a webcomic called Heavenly Nostrils before moving to the newspapers in 2015)
- Phoebe's Place (1990–1991) by Bill Schorr (US)
- Pickles (1990– ) by Brian Crane (US)
- Pic-Trix (1947–1958) by Morrie Brickman
- Pieces of Eight (1934-1935) by Charles Driscoll and Burne Hogarth (US)
- Pier-Oddities (1953–1962) by Johnny Pierotti
- Pigeon Culture (2011– ) unattributed (US)
- Pigtails (~1921–1923) by Mildred Burleigh (US)
- Pip, Squeak and Wilfred (1919–1956) by Bertram Lamb and Austin Payne (UK)
- Piranha Club (1988–2018), first titled Ernie, by Bud Grace (US)
- PIXies (1966–1987) by Jack Wohl
- Plain Jane (1969–1974) by Frank Baginski (US)
- Play-Funnies (1963–1973) not attributed initially, later by Becky
- Pluggers (1993– ) by Gary Brookins; originally by Jeff MacNelly (US)
- Pluribus (1971–1973) by Bill Rechin (US)
- Pocket Cartoons (1946–1957) by Ajay, Cull, Churchill, Phillips, and later Bert Lancaster
- Poeten og Lillemor (1950–2004) by Jørgen Mogensen (Denmark)
- Pogo (1948–1975, 1989–1993) originally by Walt Kelly (US)
- The Politician by David Fletcher
- Polly and Her Pals (1912–1958), first titled Positive Polly, by Cliff Sterrett (US)
- Pondus (1995– ) by Frode Øverli (Norway)
- Ponytail (1961–1988) by Lee Holley
- Pooch Café (2000– ) by Paul Gilligan (Canada)
- Poor Arnold's Almanac (1959–61, 1989–90) by Arnold Roth (US)
- Poor Pa (1927–1955) by Claude Callan and later Robert Quillen
- Pop (1921–1960) originally by John Millar Watt (UK)
- Popeye (Thimble Theatre) (1929– ) originally by E.C. Segar (US)
- Pops (1962–1978) by George Wolfe
- Pop's Place (1986–2001) by Sam C. Rawls
- Pot-Shots (1975– ) by Ashleigh Brilliant
- The Potts (1920–2001), first titled You and Me, originally by Stan Cross (Australia)
- Pottsy (1958–1972) by Jay Irving
- PreTeena (2001–2008), by Allison Barrows (US)
- Prickly City (2004– ) by Scott Stantis (US)
- Prince (1986) by Winthrop Prince (US)
- Prince of the Palace (1980s–2000s) by Mike Atkinson (UK – Daily Record (Scotland) newspaper)
- Prince Valiant (1937– ) originally by Hal Foster (US)
- Priscilla's Pop (1946–1983) by Al Vermeer, and later Edmund R. "Ed" Sullivan (US)
- Professor Doodle's (1987– ) by Steve Sack and Craig MacIntosh
- Professeur Nimbus (1934–1991) originally by André Daix (France)
- Professor Phumble (1960–1978) by Bill Yates
- Professor Pi (1959–1972) by V. T. Born and later George O. Swanson
- Pssst (1977– ) by J. Maddox
- Pud (1984– ) by Steve Nease (Canada)
- Puffy the Pig (1930–c.1935) originally by Don Flowers
- Pugad Baboy (1988–2019) by Apolonio Medina Jr. (Philippines)
- Punaniska (1990s) by Harri Vaalio (Finland)
- Pussycat Princess (1935–1946) by Grace Drayton and Ed Anthony, and later Ruth Carroll
- Psycops (1995–1999) by Pete Nash, John Cooper and John M Burns. (UK)

== Q ==
- Quality Time (1991–1998) by Gail Machlis
- Queen of the Universe, see Eyebeam
- Queenie (1966–1985) by Phil Interlandi
- King's Counsel (1993– ) by Graham Francis Defries and Alexander Williams (UK)
- The Quigmans (1986–2011) by Buddy Hickerson (US)
- Quincy (1970–1986) by Ted Shearer (US)

== R ==
- Radio Patrol (1933–1950) by Charlie Schmidt and Ed Sullivan
- Radio Raymond (1924) by V. R. Shoemaker
- Raising Duncan (2000–2005) by Chris Browne (US)
- Rasmus Klump (1951– ) in English entitled Bruin and Barnaby Bear, by C. & V. Hansen (Denmark)
- Real Life Adventures (1991– ) by Lance Aldrich and Gary Wise (US)
- Reality Check (1995– ) by Dave Whamond (US)
- Red and Rover (2000– ) by Brian Basset (US)
- Red Barry (1934–1938) by Will Gould
- Red Knight (1940–1943) by John Welch and Jack McGuire (US)
- Red Meat (1989– ) by Max Cannon (US)
- Red Oasis (2007– ) by multiple authors (US)
- Red Ryder (1938–1965) by Fred Harman (US)
- Redeye (1967–2008) by Gordon Bess, and later Bill Yates and Mel Casson (US)
- Reg'lar Fellers (1917–1949) by Gene Byrnes (US)
- Retail (2006–2020) by Norm Feuti (US)
- Retro Geek (2008) by Steve Dickenson and Todd Clark (US)
- Rex Morgan, M.D. (1948– ) created by Nicholas P. Dallis (US)
- Reynolds Unwrapped (1989– ) created by Dan Reynolds (US)
- Rhymes With Orange (1994– ) by Hilary Price (US)
- Ribbons and Haywire (1982–1985) by Steve Carpenter and Ed Wallerstein (US)
- Rick Kane, Space Marshal (1951) by Walter Gibson and Elmer Stoner (US)
- Rick O'Shay (1958–1981) originally by Stan Lynde (US)
- Right Around Home (1938–1965), later entitled Right Around Home with Myrtle, by Dudley Fisher, and later Bob Vittur
- Rink Brody (1946) by H. D. Williams (US)
- Rip Kirby (1946–1999) originally by Alex Raymond (US)
- Ripley's Believe It or Not (1918– ) originally by Robert Ripley (US)
- The Ripples (see The Neighbors)
- Rip Tide (1959–1970) by Grandetti and Ed Herron
- Rivets (1953–1985) by George Sixta
- Robin Malone (1967–1970) by Bob Lubbers
- Robotman (see Monty)
- Rocky (1998– ) by Martin Kellerman (Sweden)
- Rocky the Stone-Age Kid (1940–1943) by Frank Engli (US)
- De Rode Ridder (1959– ) by Willy Vandersteen (Belgium)
- Roger Bean (1913–1933) by Chic Jackson (US)
- Rollo Rollingstone (1930–1933) originally by Bruce Barr
- Romeo Brown (1954–1962) by Alfred Mazure, Peter O'Donnell and Jim Holdaway (UK)
- Romulus of Rome (1961–1963) by Mike Wong and J. P. Cahn (US)
- Ronaldinho Gaucho (2006–c. 2011) by Mauricio de Sousa (Brazil)
- Rooftop O'Toole (1976–1980) by Jerry Fearing and Bill Farmer (US)
- Room and Board (1928–1932; 1936–1958) by Gene Ahern (US)
- Rose Is Rose (1984– ) by Pat Brady (US)
- Rosie's Beau (1930–1943) by George McManus
- Roy Powers, Eagle Scout (c. 1937–1942) by "Paul Powell," Jimmy Thompson, Kemp Starrett, and Charles Coll (US)
- Roy Rogers (1949–1961) by Charles McKimson (US)
- Rubes (1984– ) by Leigh Rubin
- Rudy (1983–1985) by William Overgard (US)
- Rudy Park (2001–2018) by Darrin Bell and Theron Heir (US)
- Rufus M'Goofus (1922–1924) by Joe Cunningham (US)
- Ruggles (1935–1957) by Steve Dowling (UK)
- Rugrats (2000–2005) nominally by Nickelodeon (US)
- Running on Empty (2003– ) by Dan Beadle (US)
- Rupert Bear (1920– ) originally by Mary Tourtel (UK)
- Rural Delivery (1951– ) by Paul Gringle, and later Al Smith
- Rural Route (1959–1967, 1979) by Walter Neil Ball
- Rusty Riley (1948–1959) by Frank Godwin and later Rod Reed
- The Ryatts (1955–1994) by Cal Alley and later Jack Elrod (US)
- Rymy-Eetu (1930–1973) by Erkki Tanttu (Finland)

== S ==
- Sad Sack (1942–1958) by George Baker
- Safe Havens (1988– ) by Bill Holbrook (US)
- The Saint (1928–1963) originally by Leslie Charteris and Mike Roy (US)
- Salesman Sam (1925–1936) by George O. Swanson, and later Charles D. Small and Gladys Parker
- Sally Bananas (1969–1973) by Charles Barsotti (US)
- Sally Forth (1968–1974) by Wally Wood (US)
- Sally Forth (1982– ) by Francesco Marciuliano and Jim Keefe; originally by Greg Howard (US)
- Sally's Sallies (1927–1966) by R. J. Scott
- Salt Chuck (1988– ) by Chuck Sharman
- Sam and Silo (1977–2017?) by Jerry Dumas and Mort Walker (US)
- Sam's Strip (1961–1963) by Jerry Dumas and Mort Walker (US)
- Sandy (1962–1989) by June Unwin, and later George W. Crane and Jim Unwin
- Sandy Highflyer, the Airship Man by C. W. Kahles
- Sappo (1924–1945) by E. C. Segar, and later Tom Sims and Bill Zaboly
- Sazae-san (1946–1974) by Machiko Hasegawa (Japan)
- Scamp (1955–1988) nominally by Walt Disney (US)
- Scarth A.D. 2195 (1969–1978) by Luis Roca and Jo Addams (UK)
- Scary Gary (2008– ) by Mark Buford
- School Days (1917–1932) by Clare Victor Dwiggins (US)
- Scorchy Smith (1930–1961) originally by John Terry (US)
- Scorer (1989–2011) by Barrie Tomlinson, David Sque and David Pugh (UK)
- Screen Girl (1945–1948) by Jim Pabian
- Scroll of Fame (1951–1961) by Arthur S. Curtis
- Scroogie (1975–1976) by Tug McGraw and Mike Witte (US)
- Sea Rations (1974) by Jim Estes
- Second Chances (1997–2000) by Jeff Millar and Bill Hinds (US)
- Secret Agent X-9 (1934–1996), also titled Secret Agent Corrigan, originally by Dashiell Hammett and Alex Raymond (US)
- Secret Asian Man (1999– ) by Tak Toyoshima (US)
- See for Yourself (1946) by George Wunder (US)
- The Seekers (1966–1971) by John M. Burns, Les Lilley, Phillip Douglas and Dick O’Neil (UK)
- Seems Like Yesterday (1939–1947), also titled Home Town Echoes, by Camillus Kesler
- Selling Short (1975–1987) by Don Raden and Ken Ross
- Senator Caucus (1959–1968) by George Levine, and later Pete Wyma
- Sennin Buraku (1956–2014) by Kō Kojima (Japan)
- Sentinel Louie (1934–1943) by Otto Soglow
- Service Smiles (1956–1958) by Art Gates (US)
- Seven-O-Heaven (2009– ) by Andrew Goff and Will Startare
- Seventeen (1956–1973) by Arthur Erenberg and Bernie Lansky
- The Shadow (1940–1942) by Walter B. Gibson and Vernon Greene (US)
- Sherlock Holmes (1954–1955) by Edith Meiser and Frank Giacoia (US)
- Sherman on the Mount (1986–1988) by Walt Lee and Michael Fruchey (US)
- Sherman's Alley (1992–1996) by Toby Gibbs and Jerry Voigt (US)
- Sherman's Lagoon (1991– ) by Jim Toomey (US)
- Shirley and Son (2000–2003) by Jerry Bittle (US)
- Shoe (1977– ) originally by Jeff MacNelly (US)
- Shoecabbage (2001– ) by Teresa Burritt and David Stanford (US)
- Shopping Around (1960–1963) by Rolfe Mason
- Shortcuts (1999– ) by Jeff Harris (US)
- Short Ribs (1958–1982) by Frank O'Neal, and later Frank Hill (US)
- Shuggie and Duggie (1990s– ) by Bullimore and Anderson (Daily Record (Scotland)) (UK)
- Sibling Revelry (1989–1995) by Man Martin (US)
- Side Glances (1929–1985) by George Clark, and later William Galbraith Crawford and Gill Fox (US)
- Sign-O-Rama (1970–1979) by M. W. Martin
- Sigmund (1994– ) by Peter de Wit (Netherlands).
- Silent Sam (1920–1964) originally Adamson, by Oscar Jacobsson (Sweden)
- Silly Milly (1938–1951) by Stan MacGovern
- Silly Philly (1947–1961) by Bil Keane (US)
- Silly Symphony (1932–1945) originally by Earl Duvall and Al Taliaferro (US)
- Simon's Cat (2011–2013) by Simon Tofield (UK)
- Simpkins (1971–1980) originally by George Crenshaw (US)
- S1NGLE (2001– ) by Hanco Kolk and Peter de Wit (Netherlands)
- Single and Looking, formerly Out of the Gene Pool (2001–2008) by Matt Janz (US)
- Single Slices (1987–2001) by Peter Kohlsaat (US)
- Sir Bagby (1957–1967) by Rick Hackney and Bill Hackney (US)
- Six Chix (2000– ) by Isabella Bannerman, Margaret Shulock, Rina Piccolo, Anne Gibbons, Kathryn LeMieux, and Stephanie Piro (US)
- Skeets (1932–1951) by Dow O. Walling
- Skippy (1923–1945) by Percy Crosby (US)
- Sky Masters (1958–1961) by Jack Kirby, Wally Wood, Dick and Dave Wood (US)
- Skyroads (1930–1942) by Lester J. Maitland, and later Dick Calkins, Russell Keaton, and William Winston
- Slim Jim (1924–1942) by Stanley E. Armstrong and others later
- Slow Wave (1995–2012) by Jesse Reklaw (US)
- Slowpoke (1998– ) by Jen Sorensen (US)
- Slylock Fox (1987– ) by Bob Weber Jr. (US)
- Small Fry Diary (1961–1975) by Nonnee Coan
- Small Saves (1991– ) by J. DeMarco (US)
- The Small Society (1966–1999) by Morrie Brickman and later Bill Yates
- Small Talk (1955–1964) by Samuel R. Gornbein; (1972) by Becky; (1983– ) by Allen H. Kelly, Jr.
- Smart Alex (1995–1996) by Charlie Podrebarac (US)
- Smart Chart (1970–1983) by Herb Stansbury
- SMALL (2021–) by Max/Small studio1104 (Taiwan)
- S'Matter Pop? (1910–1940) by C. M. Payne (US)
- Smidgens (1962–1974) by Bob Cordray (US)
- Smiles (1924–1939) by Frank Chapman and various others later
- Smilin' Jack (see The Adventures of Smilin' Jack)
- The Smith Family (1951–1994) by Virginia Smith, George Smith, and later Robert Baldwin
- Smitty (1922–1974) by Walter Berndt (US)
- Smokey Stover (1935–1972) by Bill Holman (US)
- The Smythes (1930–1936) by Rea Irvin (US)
- SNAFU (see Beattie Blvd.)
- Snake Tales (1974– ) by Sols (Allan Salisbury) (Australia)
- Sniffy (1964–1973) by George Fett
- Snoodles (1913–1925) by Cy Hungerford
- Snoopy (see Peanuts)
- Snuffy Smith (see Barney Google and Snuffy Smith)
- Somebody's Stenog (1918–1941) by A. E. Hayward, and later Ray Thompson, various others, and Sam Nichols
- Sonny Boy (1982– ) by Bill Murray
- Sonny Pew (1984) by Jim Estes
- Sonny South (1953–1972) by Court Alderson
- Sonnysayings (1926–1939) by Fanny Cory
- The Sons of Liberty (1975– ) by Richard Lynn
- Soup to Nutz (2000–2018) by Rick Stromoski (US)
- Sovereign State of Affairs (1976– ) by Wood and R. David Boyd
- Space Moose (1989–1999) by Adam Thrasher (Canada)
- The Spacers (1978–1992) by Emil V. Abrahamian
- Sparks (1952–1967) by Willis Forbes
- Sparky (1953–1966) by Mel Casson
- Sparky Watts (1940–1942) by Boody Rogers
- Speck the Altar Boy (see An Altar Boy Named Speck)
- Speed Bump (1994– ) by Dave Coverly (US)
- Speed Walker, Private Eye (1972?–?) by Cris Hammond (US)
- Spence Easley, first titled Dolly Burns (1928–1935, 1949–1941) by Jack Patton (US)
- Spider-Man (The Amazing Spider-Man) (1977–2019) by Stan Lee and Larry Lieber (US)
- The Spirit (1940–1952) by Will Eisner (US)
- Spooky (1935–1971) by Bill Holman
- Spooner (2000–2002) by Ted Dawson (US)
- Sport Slants (1942–1955) by Tom Paprocki (US)
- Sports Cartoon (1940–1967) by Tom Paprocki
- The Sports File (1978– ) by Emil V. Abrahamian
- Sport Side-Lights (c. 1920–c. 1930s) by Jack Sords (US)
- Spot the Frog (2004–2008) by Mark Heath (US)
- Spur Line (1954–1955) by Bud Sagendorf
- Squeegee (1980– ) by Ken Muse
- Stacy (1981– ) by Randy Bisson
- Stampede (1974– ) by Jerry Palen
- Starbirds (1995–1996) by Graham Hey (UK)
- Star Hawks (1977–1981) originally by Gil Kane and Ron Goulart (US)
- Star Trek (1979–1982) originally by Thomas Warkentin (US)
- Star Wars (1979–1984) originally by Russ Manning (US)
- Stark Impressions by Bruce Stark (US)
- Statsministeren (1982– ) by Carsten Graabaek (Denmark)
- Stees Sees (1958–1969) by John Stees
- Steve Canyon (1947–1988) by Milton Caniff (US)
- Steve Roper and Mike Nomad (1936–2004), first titled Big Chief Wahoo, originally by Allen Saunders and Elmer Woggon (US)
- Still Life by Jerry Robinson (US)
- Stoker the Broker (1959–1985) by Henry Boltinoff (US)
- Stone Soup (1995–2020) by Jan Eliot (US)
- The Story of Martha Wayne (1953–1962) by Wilson Scruggs
- Strange As It Seems (1928–1970) by John Hix, and later Ernest Hix, Elsie Hix, Ernest Hix Jr., and Phyllis Hix
- Strange Brew by John Deering
- The Strange World of Mr. Mum (1958–1974) by Irving Phillips (US)
- Streaky (1933–1935) by Gus Edson (US)
- Streamer Kelly (1940–1943, 1946–1950) by Jack Ryan (US)
- Strictly Business (1941–1984) by Dale McFeatters (US)
- Strictly Private, later Peter Plink (1940–1948) by Quin Hall
- Strictly Richter (1945–1963) by Mischa Richter
- Striker 3D (The Sun) by Pete Nash (1985– ) (UK)
- Striptease (2000– ) by Chris Daily
- Strizz (2002–2010) by Volker Reiche (Germany)
- Student Ghetto (1996–2000) by Adam Miller (US)
- Stumpy Stumbler (1983– ) by Emil V. Abrahamian
- Sturmtruppen (1969–1995) originally by Bonvi (Franco Bonvicini) (Italy)
- Suburbia (1976–1985) by Don Raden
- Such Is Life (1928–1939) by Walt Munson, and later Charles Sughroe, Bo Brown and Kemp Starrett
- Sue to Lou (1928–1938) by Clarence R. Gettier
- Sugar (1949–1961) by Jack Fitch; (1975– ) by Robert L. Gill
- Sunday Laughs Male Cartoons (1980–1993) by Paul Swede
- Sunflower Street (1935–1949) by Tom Little and Tom Sims
- Sunny Sue (1950–1961) by Edna Markham and later Jack Fitch
- The Sunshine Club (2003–2007) by Howie Schneider (US)
- Superandom (2009– ) by Nathan Bowler (Canada)
- Superman (1939–1966) originally by Jerry Siegel and Joe Shuster (US)
- Supernatural Law (1979– ), originally Wolff and Byrd, Counselors of the Macabre, by Batton Lash.
- Susie Q. Smith (1945–1959) by Linda Walter and Jerry Walter
- Suske en Wiske (1945– ), titled Spike and Suzy or Willy and Wanda in English, originally by Willy Vandersteen (Belgium)
- Swamp (1981– ) by Gary Clark (Australia)
- Swamp Brats (1981– ) by Warren Sattler
- Sweeney & Son (1934–1960) by Al Posen
- Sweetie Pie (1954–1967) by Nadine Seltzer
- Sydney (1985–1986) by Scott Stantis (US)
- Sykes’ Cartoons (1925–1941) by Bill Sykes
- Sylvia (1980–2012) by Nicole Hollander (US)
- Flightoons (1996–2016 ) by Shujaat Ali (Aviation Cartoonist) – Flight Safety Newsletter P.A.F. , (Pakistan)

== T ==
- Tailspin Tommy (1928–1942) by Glen Chaffin and Hal Forrest (US)
- Take it from the Tinkersons by Bill Bettwy
- Tales from the Great Book (1954–1972) by John Lehti
- Tales of the Green Beret (1965–1968) originally by Robin Moore, Joe Kubert and Howard Liss (US)
- Tank McNamara (1974– ) by Jeff Millar and Bill Hinds (US)
- Tar Pit (1993–1994) by Steve Dickenson (US)
- Tarzan (1929–2002) originally by Hal Foster, later by Burne Hogarth, Russ Manning, and others (US)
- Tee Vee Laughs (1975–1985), also known as TV Laffs, by Cliff Rogerson and others
- Teech (1983– ) by Aaron Bacall
- Teena (1945–1963) by Hilda Terry
- Teenage Mum (1994–1996) by Graham Hey (UK)
- Teenage Mutant Ninja Turtles (1990–1997) (US)
- The Teenie Weenies (1924, 1934, 1941–1970) by William Donahey
- Tell It Like It Is (see Dunagin's People)
- The Tenderloiner (1947–1961) by Jack Fitch
- The Terrors of the Tiny Tads (1905–1914) by Gustave Verbeek (US)
- Terry and the Pirates (1934–1973) originally by Milton Caniff (US); (1995) by Michael Uslan and the Brothers Hildebrandt
- Tex Austin (1949–1950) originally by Sam Robins & Tom Fanning (US)
- Tex Benson (1980–1989) originally by Chuck Roblin
- Texas Slim and Dirty Dalton (1925–1958) by Ferd Johnson (US)
- Thatch (1994–1998) by Jeff Shesol (US)
- That Little Game (1917–1927) by Bert Link
- That'll Be the Day (1951–1962) by Fritz Wilkinson
- That's Jake (1986–ended) by Jake Vest
- That's Life (1999–2005) by Mark Twohy (US)
- That's Not the Half of It by Elmer Messner (1926–1927)
- Then – Now (1952–1971) by Fred Fox
- Theophilus (1966–2002) by Bob West (US)
- There Oughta Be a Law! (1944–1985) by Al Fagaly and Harry Shorten, and later Frank Borth, Warren Whipple and Mort Gerberg (US)
- These Women (1946–1963) by Gregory D’Alessio
- They'll Do It Every Time (1929–2008) originally by Jimmy Hatlo (US)
- Thimble Theatre (1919–1966), also titled Thimble Theatre starring Popeye , by E. C. Segar (US)
- Things to Come (1942–1954) by Hank Barrow and later Jim Bresnan
- This and That (1945–1958) by various, including Henry Boltinoff
- This Curious World (1931–1951) by William Ferguson and later George Clark
- This Funny World (1944–1985), gag cartoons by Henry Boltinoff, Ted Key, Don Orehek, Mort Walker and others
- This Is Sport? (1958–1978) by Court Alderson
- This Modern World (1986– ) by Tom Tomorrow (US)
- Thorn McBride (1960–1962) by Frank Giacoia and later Mel Keefer
- Those Browns (1976– ) by Bill Murray (www.billmurrays.com)
- Those Were the Days (1951–1983) by Art Beeman
- Tickle Box (1974–1994) by Ted Trogdon
- Ticklers (1945–1960) by George Scarbo
- Tiffany Jones (1964–1977) by Pat Tourret and Jenny Butterworth (UK)
- Tiger (1965–2004) by Bud Blake (US)
- The Tillers (1945–1960) by Les Carroll
- Tillie the Toiler (1921–1959) by Russ Westover and later Bob Gustafson (US)
- Timbertoes (1946– ) by John Gee (cartoonist) by Marileta Robinson and Judith Hunt (1992–2002)
- Time Out! (1936–1984) by Chet Smith and later Jeff Keate
- The Timid Soul (1925–1953) by H. T. Webster (US)
- Timmy (1948–1960) by Howard Sparber
- Tim Tyler's Luck (1928–1996) by Lyman Young (US)
- Tina (1983–1994) by D. Lucas
- Tina's Groove (2002–2017) by Rina Piccolo (Canada–US)
- Tintin (The Adventures of Tintin) (1929–1944) by Hergé (Georges Remi) (Belgium)
- Tiny Sepuku (1997– ) by Ken Cursoe (US)
- Tiny Tim (1931–1958) by Stanley Link
- Tippie (see Cap Stubbs and Tippie)
- Tizzy (1957–1970) by Kate Osann (US)
- Toadstools (1983–1992) by Leonard Bruce and Charles Durck
- Tobias Seicherl (1930–1940) by Ladislaus Kmoch
- TOBY, Robot Satan (2008– ) by Corey Pandolph
- Today's Laugh (1948–1973) by Tom Henderson and William King, and later Jeff Machamer, Frank Owen, Rodney de Sarro, Reamer Keller, Jeff Keate, Cathy Joachim, Bill Yates, Joe Zeis and Betty Swords
- Today's World (1932–1957) by David Brown
- Todd the Dinosaur (2001– ) by Patrick Roberts
- Tom and Jerry (1950s–1991) (US)
- Tom Corbett, Space Cadet (1951–1953) by Ray Bailey (US)
- Tom Puss (Dutch original Tom Poes) (1941–1986) by Marten Toonder (Netherlands)
- Tom Sawyer and Huck Finn (1918) by Clare Victor Dwiggins (US); see also Dwig's Huckleberry Finn strip from 1940
- Tom the Dancing Bug (1990– ) by Ruben Bolling (US)
- Tom Trick (1951–1969) by Dale Goss, and later Stan Maays and Mary Goss
- Too Much Coffee Man (1991– ) by Shannon Wheeler (US)
- The Toodles (1945–1961) by Betsy Baer and Stanley F. Baer
- Toonerville Folks (1908–1955) by Fontaine Fox (sometimes called Toonerville Trolley) (US)
- Toots and Casper (1918–1956) by Jimmy Murphy (US)
- Top Dog (1985–1987) by created by Lennie Herman (writer) and Warren Kremer (artist) (US)
- Top of the World (1985–1987) by Mark Tonra (US)
- Touché (1991– ) by Tom (Germany)
- Traveling Light (1959–1968) by Bob Sloane, Jim Weakley, and Shirley Sloane, and later Ron Butler and Peter Porges
- Travels with Farley (see Farley)
- The Treadwells (1974–1979), first titled The New Neighbors, by Bob Bugg (US)
- The Trendy's (1983– ) by Jim Horan
- Trevor! by Piper and Lee (Australia)
- The Tricky Ones (1983–1993) by Magila
- Trim's Arena (1973–1983) by Hal Trim and later Wayne Stayskal
- Triple Take (2005–2007) by Todd Clark and Scott Nickel
- Troubletown (1988–2011) by Lloyd Dangle (US)
- Trudy (1963–2005) by Jerry Marcus (US)
- True Life Adventures (1955–1971) nominally by Walt Disney
- Tuffy (1932–1957) by Syd Hoff
- Tug Transom (1954–1968) by Peter O'Donnell and Alfred Sindall (UK)
- Tumbleweeds (1965–2007) by Tom K. Ryan (US)
- Tundra (1991– ) by Chad Carpenter
- The Turners (2004– ) by Eric Turner (US)
- Turning Back the Times (1947–1961) by Jack Winter
- Tutelandia by Tute (2004–present) (Argentina)
- TV Tee-Hees (1957–1975) by Henry Scarpelli
- Twin Earths (1952–1963) by Alden McWilliams and Oskar Lebeck
- Twitch (1973– ) by Howard Rands
- The World's Greatest Superheroes (1978–1985) originally by Martin Pasko (US)

== U ==
- The Umbrella Man (1909–1913) by John "Dok" Hager
- Uncle Art's Funland (1933; 1950–1991; 2009– ) by Art Nugent, Jr.
- Uncle Charlie (1959–1978) by Peter Laing
- Uncle Remus and His Tales of Br'er Rabbit (1945–1972) nominally by Walt Disney
- Up Anchor! (1968–1972) by Kreigh Collins (US)
- Up Front (1940–1948) by Bill Mauldin (US)
- The Upside-Downs of Little Lady Lovekins and Old Man Muffaroo (1903–1905) by Gustave Verbeek (US)
- U.S. Acres (1986–1989) by Jim Davis (US)

== V ==
- The Van Swaggers (1930–1943) by Russ Westover
- Vanhat herrat (1982–2002) by Pauli Heikkilä and Markku Paretskoi
- Varoomshka (1969–1979) by John Kent
- Vater und Sohn (1934–1937) by E. O. Plauen (Erich Ohser) (Germany)
- Vic Flint (1945–1964) by Ralph Lane and Michael O’Malley, and later Dean Miller, Jay Heavilin, Art Sansom, and Russ Winterbotham
- Video Cartoons (1983– ) by various
- Viewpoint (1949–1953) by Dave Gerard
- Vignettes of Life (1925–1960) by Frank Godwin, and later J. Norman Lynd, Leonard Starr and Harry Weinart
- Viivi & Wagner (1997– ) by Jussi Tuomola (Finland)
- Village Square (1966– ) by Chuck Stiles
- Virgil (1943–1960) by Leonard Kleis

== W ==
- Wallace and Gromit (2010– ) by Mychailo Kazybrid (UK)
- Walnut Cove (1991–1999) by Mark Cullum (US)
- Walt Disney's Donald Duck (1983– ) nominally by Walt Disney
- Walt Disney's Mickey Mouse (1983– ) nominally by Walt Disney
- Walt Disney's Treasury of Classic Tales (1952–1987) by various artists, including Jesse Marsh and Jack Kirby (US)
- Wapsi Square (2001– ) by Paul "Pablo" Taylor
- War on Crime (1936–1938) by Frank Godwin and Jimmy Thompson (US)
- Wash Tubbs (1924–1949) by Roy Crane, merged with Captain Easy in 1949 (US)
- Watch Your Head (2006– ) by Cory Thomas (US)
- Wayout (1964–1970) by Ken Muse (US)
- Weather Comics (1946–1970) by George Scarbo
- Webster Classics (1954–1980) by H. T. Webster
- Wee Pals (1965–2014) by Morrie Turner (US)
- Wee Willie Winkie's World (1906–1907) by Lyonel Feininger (US)
- Wee Women (1957–1994) by Mell Lazarus and later Jim Whiting (US)
- Welcome to the Jungle (2007– ) by Michael Pohrer (US)
- Werebears and Only Children (2007–2010) by Jennifer Barrett (CA)
- Wes Slade (1960–1982) by George Stokes (UK)
- What a Guy! (1987–1996) by Bill Hoest and later Bunny Hoest (US)
- What Willie Got (1909) by Fred G. Long
- When I Was Short (1989–1992) by Michael Fry and Guy Vasilovich (US)
- Where I'm Coming From (1989–2004) by Barbara Brandon-Croft
- White Boy (1933–1936) by Garrett Price (US)
- Wide Awake Willie (1919–1920) by Gene Byrnes (US)
- Wildwood (1999–2002) by Dan Wright and Tom Spurgeon (US)
- Williams Cartoons (1928–1942) by Gluyas Williams
- Willie (1948–1963) by Leonard Sansone (US)
- Willie and Joe (1940–1948, special reappearance in 1988 Steve Canyon farewell) by Bill Mauldin (US)
- Willie Cute (1903–1906) by Joseph A. Lemon
- Willie Dee by Vic Green
- Willie Lumpkin (1959–1961) by Stan Lee and Dan DeCarlo (US)
- Willie Willis (1925–1948) by Robert Quillen
- Willy 'n Ethel (1981– ) by Joe Martin (US)
- Will-Yum (1953–1966) by Dave Gerard
- Win, Lose & Draw (1985– ) by Drew Litton
- Windy Riley (1927–1932) by Ken Kling
- Winky Ryatt (see The Ryatts)
- Winnie the Pooh (1978–1988) by Disney
- Winnie Winkle, first titled Winnie Winkle the Breadwinner (1920–1996) by Martin Branner, and later Max VanBibber, Henry Raduta, J.K.S., and Frank Bolle (US)
- Winthrop, first titled Morty Meekle (1956–1993) by Dick Cavalli
- Witty Kitty (1929–1946) by Nina Wilcox Putnam, and later Walt Spouse, L. Frank, and Carl Kuhn
- The Wizard of Id (1964– ) by Johnny Hart and Brant Parker (US)
- Wonder Woman (1945) by Charles Moulton and H.G. Peter (US)
- Woody's World (1963–1979) by John Holm, and later Bill Potter
- Word-a-Day (1946–1979) by Mickey Bach
- Wordsmith (1976–1978) by Tim Menees
- Working Daze (2001– ) by John Zakour; illustrated originally by Andre Noel, later by Kyle Miller, and currently by Scott Roberts
- Working It Out (2001– ) by Charlos Gary (US)
- The World Museum (1937–1938) by Holling C. Holling (US)
- The World of Lily Wong (1986–2001) by Larry Feign (Hong Kong)
- The World of the Bible (1983– ) by C. Cassel and Fred Cassel
- The World's Greatest Superheroes (1978–1985) originally by George Tuska, Vince Colletta and Marty Pasko (US)
- Wright Angles (1977–1990) by Larry Wright (US)
- Wulffmorgenthaler (2001– ) by Mikael Wulff and Anders Morgenthaler (Denmark)

== Y ==
- Yankee Doodles (1973–1977) by Ben Templeton, Don Kracke, and Fred W. Martin (US)
- The Yellow Kid (see Hogan's Alley)
- Yo, Matías (1993– ) by Fernando Sendra (Argentina)
- Yogi Bear (1961–1988) by Hanna-Barbera Productions
- You Know Me Al (1922–1925) by Ring Lardner (US)
- Young Hobby Club by Cappy Dick

== Z ==
- Zack Hill (2003– ) by John Deering and John Newcombe (US)
- Zanies (1977– ) by J. Maddox
- Ze General (1945–1955) by Bob Leffingwell
- Zeus! (1979) by Corky Trinidad (US)
- Ziggy (1971– ) by Tom Wilson (US)
- Zimmie (1912–1913)
- Zippy (1976– ) by Bill Griffith (US)
- Zits (1997– ) by Jerry Scott and Jim Borgman (US)

== Sources ==
- Strickler, Dave (1995). Syndicated Comic Strips and Artists, 1924–1995: The Complete Index. Cambria, California: Comics Access. ISBN 0-9700077-0-1.
