= 1930 in comics =

Notable events of 1930 in comics.

== Events and publications ==
=== January ===
- January 10: Quick & Flupke by Hergé debuts in Le Petit Vingtième.
- January 13: The first Mickey Mouse comic strip, written by Walt Disney, drawn by Ub Iwerks, is published. After a month Iwerks hands the series over to Win Smith, who will continue to draw it until May. The first Mickey Mouse adventure (Lost on a Desert Island) marks the comics debut of Minnie Mouse too. Five months later, Floyd Gottfredson takes over.
- January 27: The first episode of Tack Knight's Little Folks is published. It will run until 1933.

=== April ===
- April 1: First episode of Mickey Mouse In Death Valley, the first Mickey adventure written and drawn (in collaboration) by Floyd Gottfredson, though Win Smith is still the main artist. The story sees the comics debut of various recurring characters (Clarabelle Cow, Horace Horsecollar, the Minnie's uncle Mortimer and the two villains Sylvestre Shyster and Pete).
- April 21: Joe Palooka by Ham Fisher debuts.

=== May ===
- Floyd Gottfredson now becomes the main artist behind the Mickey Mouse comic strip for 45 years.
- May 8: As the first The Adventures of Tintin story, Tintin in the Land of the Soviets, reaches its conclusion in Le Petit Vingtième and has Tintin return from the USSR to Brussels the magazine's editors stage Tintin's return in real life with an actor and a dog. To their amazement the railway station's square is crowded with readers, making everybody realize that Tintin has become a success. Hergé is quickly encouraged to start a new Tintin story.

=== June ===
- June 1: The final episode of Norman McMurray's Googles is published.
- June 5: in Le petit Vingtième, first episode of Tintin in the Congo, by Hergè.
- June 7: The Little King by Otto Soglow debuts in The New Yorker.
- June 7: Cancellation of the Chinese comics magazine Shanghai Manhua.
- June (: Pier Cloruro de' Lambicchi by Giovanni Manca debuts in Il Corriere dei Piccoli.
- June 15: Rea Irvin's The Smythes makes its debut in The New York Herald Tribune and will run until 25 October 1936.

=== September ===
- September 8: Blondie by Chic Young makes its debut.
- Mr. Slicker and the Egg Robbers, by Floyd Gottfredson starts off in the newspapers, the first story where Mickey Mouse plays as a detective. It also marks the debut of Patricia Pig, of the sympathetic criminal Butch and of the Minnie's father Marcus Mouse.

=== October ===
- October 5: Tobias Seicherl by Ladislaus Kmoch debuts in the Austrian newspaper Das Kleine Blatt.

=== November ===
- November 1: Nero and Zero by Allan Morley debuts in The Wizard.

=== December ===
- December 6: The final episode of Mel Cummin's Good Time Guy is published.

=== Specific date unknown ===
- Animal Crackers by Lane.
- He Done Her Wrong by Milt Gross.
- Pitche by Alek Stonkus debuts in Le Bon Pint Amusant.
- Rymy-Eetu (1930–1973) by Erkki Tanttu.
- Scorchy Smith (1930–1961) by John Terry.

== Births ==
=== January ===
- January 24: John Romita Sr., American comic book artist (Marvel Comics), (d. 2023).

=== April ===
- April 24: Richard Donner, American film director and comics writer (co-wrote Superman stories with Geoff Johns and Adam Kubert), (d. 2021).

=== June ===
- June 16: Frank Thorne, American comics artist (Red Sonja, Dr. Guy Bennett/ Dr. Duncan, Moonshine McJugs), (d. 2021).

== Deaths ==
=== January ===
- January 3: Clare Briggs, American comics artist (A. Piker Clerk, Mr. and Mrs., When A Feller Needs A Friend), dies at age 54.
- January 26: Irving Knickerbocker, aka Knick, American comics artist (Dizzy Dugan, Mac, continued Little Joe Says and The Tinymites), dies at age 32 as a result of injuries sustained in a car accident.

=== February ===
- February 6: Sals Bostwick, American comics artist (Heroes of the Week, Room and Board, assisted on Gasoline Alley), dies at age 27 after an operation for appendicitis.

=== June ===
- June 24: Alfaro Reijding, Dutch illustrator, lithographer and comics artist, dies at age 77.

=== July ===
- July 5: Marjorie Organ, American comics artist (Reggie and the Heavenly Twins, Strange What a Difference a Mere Man Makes, The Wrangle Sisters), dies at age 43.

=== August ===
- August 26: Pieter van Looy, Dutch illustrator and comic artist (made several sequential illustrations), dies at age 77.

=== October ===
- October 19: Henry Gerbault, French illustrator, painter and cartoonist, dies at age 67.

=== December ===
- December 26: Kin Hubbard, American comics artist (Abe Martin of Brown County), dies at age 62.

=== Specific date unknown ===
- Johann Bahr, German painter, illustrator and comics artist (made early text comics for Fliegende Blätter), dies at age 70 or 71.
- Harry Cornell Greening, American comics artist (Si Swapper, Uncle George Washington Bings, The Woo Woo Bird, Percy - Brains He Has Nix, Prince Errant), dies at age 43 or 44.
- Rolf Kluge, Norwegian comics artist (Per en Else, Skibsreder Jobbenheim og Sølvmine, continued Skomakker Bekk of Tvillingene Hans), dies at age 48.

== Sources ==
- Peeters, Benoît (2012) [2002]. Hergé: Son of Tintin. Tina A. Kover (translator). Baltimore, Maryland: Johns Hopkins University Press. ISBN 978-1-4214-0454-7.
