= National Lampoon Presents The Very Large Book of Comical Funnies =

1975 humor book by Sean Kelly

The Very Large Book of Comical Funnies
- Author: Sean Kelly (editor)
- Language: English
- Genre: comedy, parody
- Publisher: National Lampoon
- Publication date: 1975
- Publication place: United States
- Media type: Print

National Lampoon Presents The Very Large Book of Comical Funnies is an American humor book, a book of comic strips that was published in 1975 in paperback as a spin-off of National Lampoon magazine. Although it appears to be a book, in reality it was a "special issue" of the magazine and as such it was sold on newsstands. On the cover it is described as "A never before published history of the comics" and it is also described as "An Adult Comic". It was not an anthology; it was a collection of original material written by the Lampoon's regular contributors especially for the book. It was edited by Sean Kelly.

Apparently this book grew into a series: there were two follow-up books with the same title, but with the numbers #2 and #3 added. Number 3 was published in 1986.

The "history" aspect of the book included a comic strip, a family feature, which supposedly was created in the 1950s. This was The Appletons by B. K. Taylor. Another strip was a parody of Bill Mauldin's World War II strip "Willie and Joe", called "Bill Maudlin's Billie and Moe", drawn by Warren Sattler.
