= Mämmilä =

Finnish comic strip

Mämmilä is a full-page comic strip by Finnish cartoonist Tarmo Koivisto and co-written by Hannu Virtanen.

Mämmilä is a fictional small country municipality, supposedly in the Häme region, and was originally modeled on the municipality of Orivesi. The cartoon depicted various contemporary issues in Finnish life, from various social changes to the coming of African refugees and membership in the European Union. The municipality has numerous colorful characters, from local political leaders and potentates to Varpu-Viljami (local dowser) and Mohammed al-Zomal (Somalian refugee), nicknamed "Mukku" after his pronunciation of the Finnish word "muikkukukko".

Unusually for comic strips, the storyline happens in real time, and the characters in Mämmilä age normally, at the same pace as the comic strip in real life. For example, a girl called Sari was born in the comic in 1980, and is now an adult punk-style girl.

The strip was originally published 1974 in a Swedish-Finnish magazine, Suomen Sanoma (Finnish News) in Sweden. The magazine was published only a couple of times per year, so the strip moved to Finnish magazine called Me (We) in 1976. In 1983, Helsingin Sanomat began its monthly magazine, and Mämmilä moved in there. HS dropped the strip after 13 years, because the readers wanted a strip about life in Helsinki. Tarmo Koivisto still draws Tää kaupunki (This city) strip, written by various HS journalists.

In 2002, Tarmo Koivisto published a comic album WWW.MAMMILA.FI in which the Internet and shady business practices come to Mämmilä. It was under work for five years.

In late 2006, Suomen Kuvalehti, a weekly magazine wanted to publish Mämmilä. Because Koivisto has had many pages done for the next album after 2002, the storyline is not in real time right now, but eventually it will be.

== Other places ==
Mämmilä is also a real-life village in Pello, Lapland, 66°49′N 24°0′E.
