= Dogface (military) =

American infantrymen

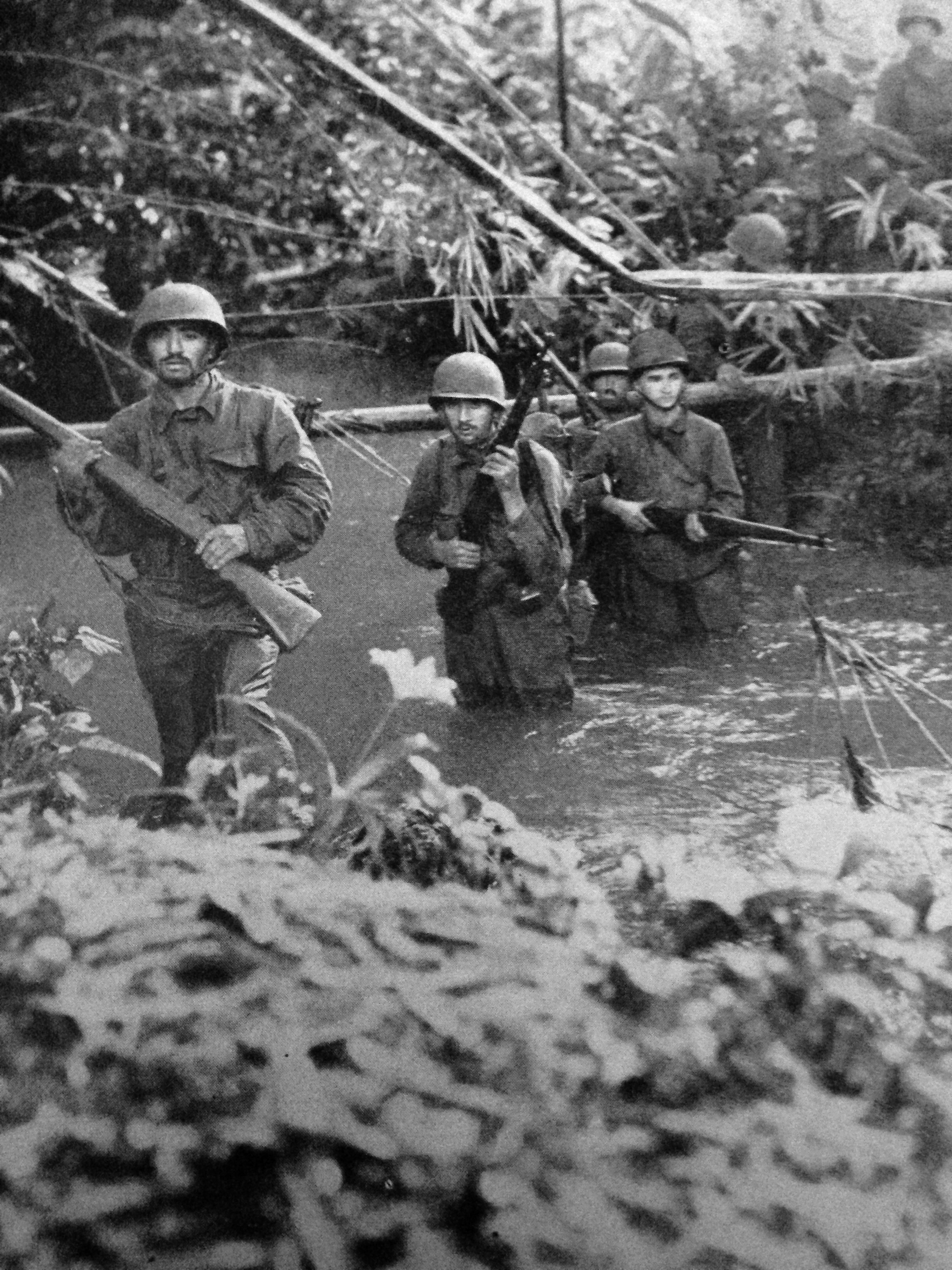
"Dogfaces" of the 172nd Infantry Regiment patrolling New Georgia, 1943

Dogface is a nickname for a United States Army soldier, especially an enlisted infantryman. The term gained widespread use during World War II.

== History ==
The term "dogface" to describe an American soldier appeared in print at least as early as 1935. Contemporaneous newspapers accounted for the nickname by explaining that soldiers "wear dog-tags, sleep in pup tents, and are always growling about something" and "the army is a dog's life...and when they want us, they whistle for us." Phillip Levesque, a veteran of the U.S. 89th Infantry Division in World War II, wrote that "we were filthy, cold and wet as a duck hunting dog and we were ordered around sternly and loudly like a half-trained dog."

During World War II, the nickname came to be seen as a self-appointed term of endearment for soldiers, but as an insult if used by others, such as United States Marine Corps personnel.

== In media ==
Up Front, a cartoon drawn by Bill Mauldin that featured everyday infantrymen Willie and Joe, helped popularize the term "dogface." The cartoon ran from 1940 to 1943 in the 45th Division News, and in Stars and Stripes until 1948.

In 1942, Bert Gold and Ken Hart, two members of the United States Army Air Forces, published a song called "The Dogface Soldier," which one newspaper called an "authentic foxhole folksong." The song became the theme of the 3rd Infantry Division and was featured in the 1955 film To Hell and Back starring Audie Murphy, who served in the 3rd Division. A recording of the song by Russ Morgan, taken from the film, became a No. 30 pop hit in the U.S. the same year.

== See also ==
- Doughboy
- G.I.
- Devil Dog
