= Devil Dog =

U.S. Marine nickname

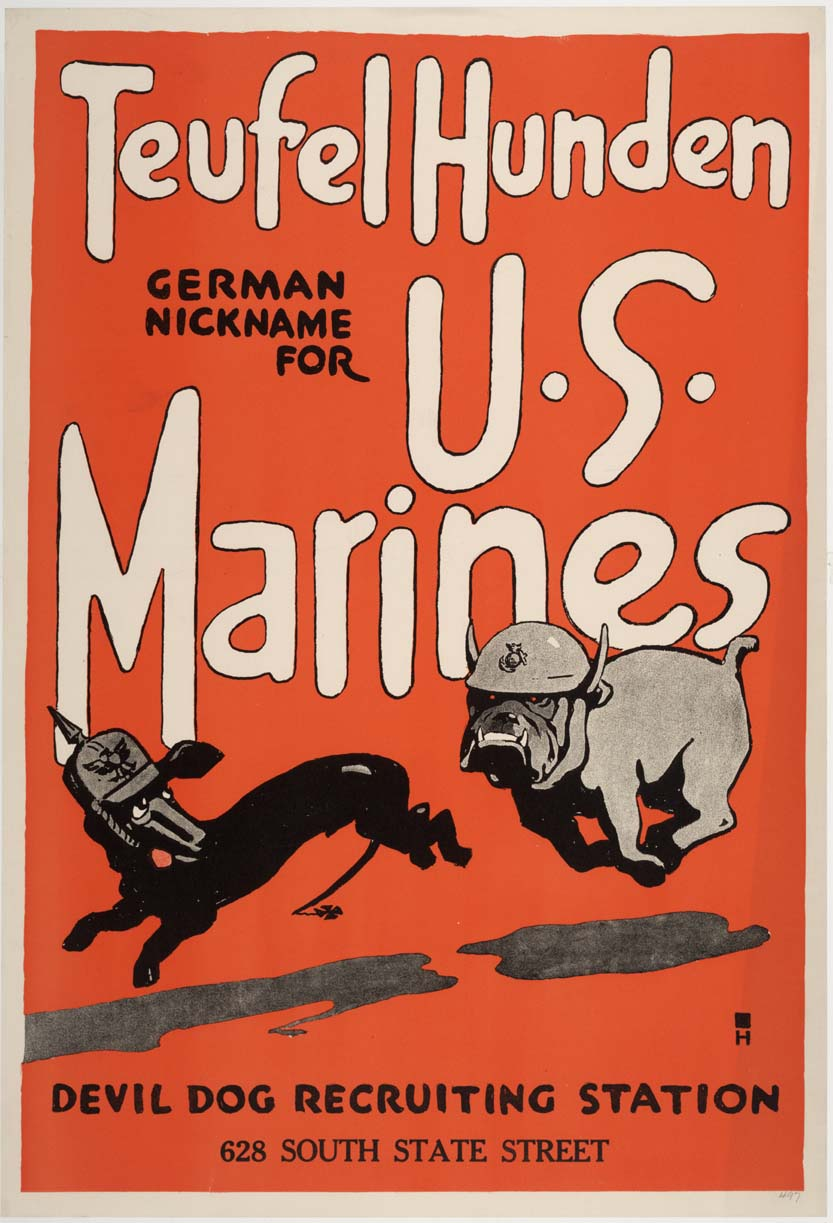
A recruiting poster from 1918

Devil Dog is a nickname for a United States Marine coined during World War I. While the term's origin has been popularly attributed to German soldiers, there is no evidence of this.

== History ==
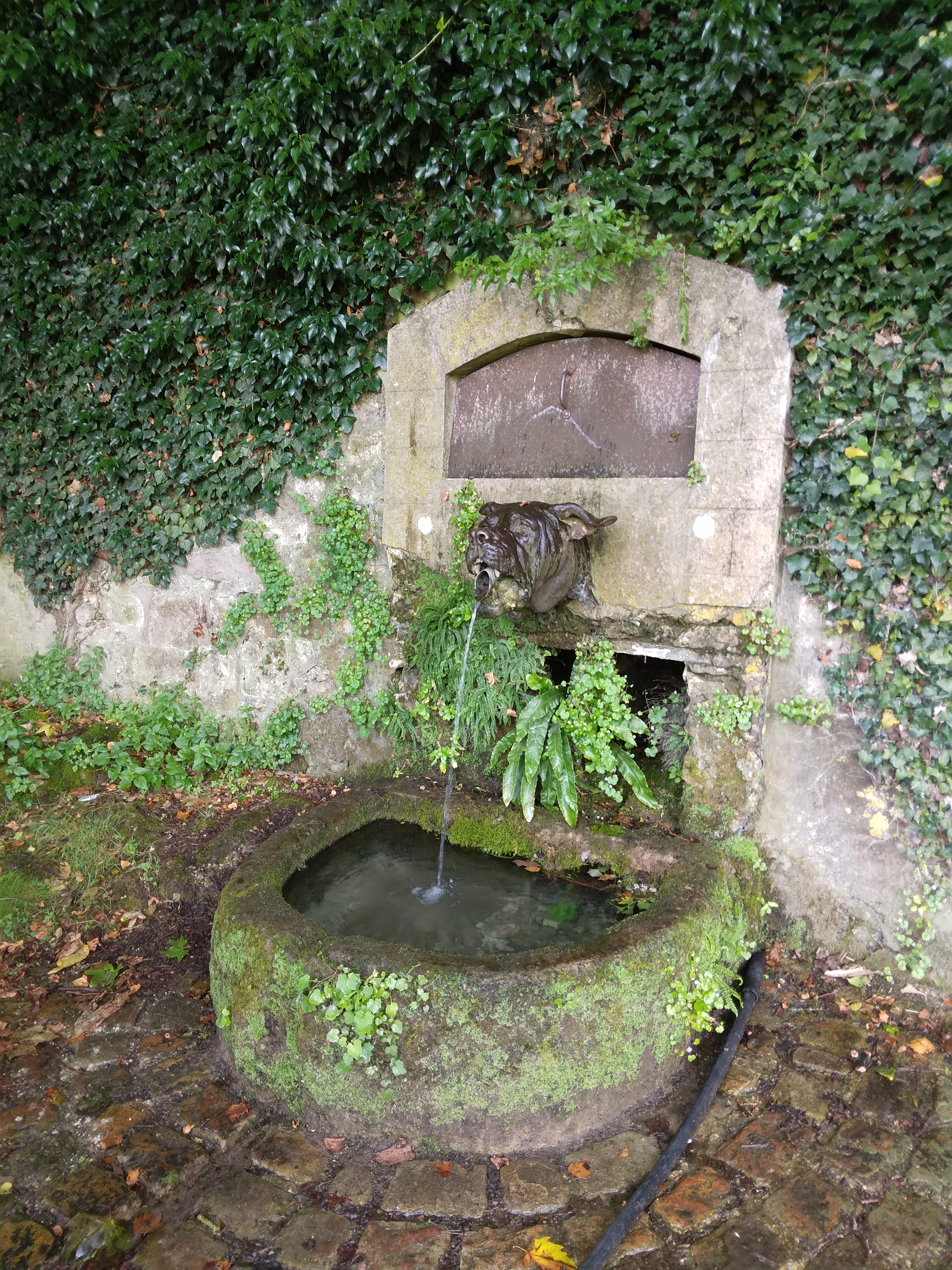
The Bulldog fountain in Belleau

Multiple publications of the United States Marine Corps claim that the nickname "Teufel Hunden" (Note: The correct German spellings are "Teufelshund" (singular) and "Teufelshunde" (plural). However, while "Teufelshund" is a valid grammatical construction, the word is unknown in Germany. The more likely choice for a German speaker would be "Höllenhund"—"hellhound" in English—casting further doubt on the origin story.)—"Devil Dogs" in English—was bestowed upon the Marines by German soldiers at the Battle of Belleau Wood in June 1918. However, on April 14, 1918, six weeks before that battle began, hundreds of U.S. newspapers ran a fanciful, unsigned wire service report that stated:

That time-honored nickname, borne by the United States marines for generations—leathernecks—is no more! At least, the Germans have abandoned it, according to reports from France. In its place the Teutons have handed the sea soldiers one with far more meaning. They call the American scrappers "teufel hunden," which, in English, means "devil dogs." (Note: Multiple sources. This quote was also reprinted in the May 11, 1918 edition of Arms and the Man, the publication of the National Rifle Association.)

The American press immediately seized upon the new term, and it was quickly used on a Marine Corps recruiting poster by Charles Buckles Falls in July 1918, showing an American bulldog chasing a German dachshund wearing a pickelhaube.

The veracity of the German origin of the term, however, was questioned as early as 1921 when journalist H. L. Mencken wrote that the term was the invention of an American war correspondent. In 2016, Robert V. Aquilina of the United States Marine Corps History Division stated that the term was likely first used by the Marines themselves and that there is no evidence of German use or origin of the term. Similarly, Patrick Mooney of the National Museum of the Marine Corps wrote that "We have no proof that it came from German troops...There is no written document in German that says that the Marines are Devil Dogs or any correct spelling or language component of 'Devil Dog' in German." Further, when asked about the term by Stars and Stripes, Lt. Col. Heiner Bröckermann of the German Military History Research Institute said that he had "never heard anyone using the word 'Teufelshund' or 'Teufelshunde' in Germany." Nevertheless, "Devil Dog" has become firmly entrenched in the lore of the United States Marine Corps.

== See also ==
- USS Belleau Wood
- Quantico Marines Devil Dogs football
- Chesty
- Dogface
- Jarhead
- Leatherneck
