= Gary Clark =

Gary Clark or Gary Clarke may refer to:

== Sports ==
- Gary Clarke (rugby league) (fl. 1968), New Zealand former professional rugby league footballer
- Gary Clark (American football) (born 1962), American former football player
- Gary Clark (footballer) (born 1964), Scottish former football midfielder
- Gary Clark (golfer) (born 1971), English professional golfer
- Gary Clark (basketball) (born 1994), American basketball player

== Other people ==
- Gary Clarke (born 1933), American actor
- Gary Clark (cartoonist) (born 1954), Australian cartoonist, creator of Swamp
- Gary Clark (musician) (born 1962), Scottish musician, lead singer of Danny Wilson
- Gary Clarke (pastor), pastor of Hillsong London until early 2021
- Gary Clark Jr. (born 1984), American guitarist

== See also ==
- Garry Clark, English rugby league footballer
