= Sigmund (comics) =

Comic strip

- Author: Peter de Wit
- Launch date: 1994
- Syndicate(s): De Volkskrant
- Genre(s): Gag-a-day, Satire

Doctor Sigmund is a Dutch gag-a-day comic strip, created by Peter de Wit. It centers around a short-sized psychiatrist who constantly fails to provide his patients with proper help.

== History ==
Sigmund made his first appearance in an educational TV documentary series for Teleac about the art of drawing comics, presented by Dutch comics artists Hanco Kolk and Peter de Wit. The episode aired on Dutch television in 1992 and dealt with gag-a-day comics. De Wit explained he came up with an idea for a gag-a-day starring a dwarf-like, one-eyed psychiatrist whose cynical attitude towards his patient causes them to hate him. The series was originally called "Mensch, durf te leeven" (after a 1919 song of the same name), but was later changed to the character's name Sigmund, a nod to Sigmund Freud. Only two years later did the comic strip actually get published. It runs in the Dutch newspaper De Volkskrant and has also been published in Het Parool, Het Laatste Nieuws and Gazet van Antwerpen In Het Laatste Nieuws it was published as Meneerke Psy, but only ran for three months because readers felt the strip was too cynical. As of 2015, 25 albums have been published, special editions not included.

== The comic ==
Many gags feature black comedy, such as suicidal patients, serial killers or people with mental issues. Sigmund is the only recurring character, though sometimes cameo's from Dutch celebrities, like Queen Maxíma can be seen.

== Spin-offs ==
Sigmund also has a spin-off called Burka Babes, featuring women in burka discussing matters.

In 2011 De Wit made a special graphic novel about Sigmund called Het Lege Nest ("The Empty Nest").

== Stage adaptation ==
De Wit also adapted Sigmund into a theatrical sketch format. During the Cartoonference tour in December 2004 he, Hanco Kolk, Kees de Boer (cartoonist) and Lectrr played stage shows based on the comic strip.

== Awards ==
In 1995 De Wit received the VSV-Publieksprijs for the first Sigmund album. According to the author the comics are very popular with actual psychiatrists who put them on display in their waiting room for their clients to enjoy.
