= Gilles de Geus =

Dutch humoristic/historical comics series

- Author(s): Hanco Kolk (art, writing), Peter de Wit (writing)
- Current status/schedule: Discontinued
- Launch date: 1983
- End date: 2003
- Syndicate(s): Oberon, Big Balloon, Silvester, Arboris
- Genre(s): Historical comics, Adventure comics, Humor comics

Gilles de Geus ("Gilles de Geus") is a Dutch humoristic/historical comics series, created by Hanco Kolk and Peter de Wit in 1983. It is set in the 16th and 17th centuries during the Eighty Years' War and features the adventures of Gilles, a brave but not always too bright resistance fighter who is part of the Geuzen, an army who fight the Spanish oppressor in the Netherlands. The series has been compared to Asterix for being a humoristic comics series set in a historical time period, containing a lot of satirical winks and references.

The series has been translated into English as "Bryant the Brigand" and was published by Alibris. It has also been translated into Spanish as Tristán el salteador.

== Concept ==
"Gilles de Geus" was pre-published in the Dutch comics magazine Eppo and later in Sjors en Sjimmie Stripblad. Originally it was a gag-a-day comic, drawn by Hanco Kolk and written by Wilbert Plijnaar, with stories that lasted only a few pages and were mostly about Gilles' failed attempts at robbing stagecoaches and his confrontations with incompetent Spanish militaries. When Peter de Wit collaborated on the scripts the stories took a new direction and became full-length adventure stories. Gilles became a resistance leader within de Geuzen and serving under William the Silent to combat the Spanish oppressor. He also became more heroic, with the comic relief being subjugated to his monosyllabic friend Leo and the vain and arrogant Admiral Lumeij.

Despite directly referencing historic events during the Eighty Years' War and appearances of real-life historical characters such as Admiral Lumeij, William the Silent, Cornelis Drebbel, Desiderius Erasmus, Maarten Tromp, Michiel de Ruyter, Rembrandt Van Rijn and the Duke of Alba the tone is predominantly humoristic and takes some license with anachronisms as a result.

In 1986 Peter Visser and Carol van Dijk recorded a song about "Gilles de Geus" for a fan club of the series. Visser and Van Dijk would later become famous as the rock band Bettie Serveert.

The series was terminated in 2003, but in 2014 the makers made an attempt to relaunch it through crowdfunding.

== Characters ==
- Gilles: A highwayman who is so incompetent that the prices on the "wanted" posters for his capture keep going down. He is later accidentally hired as a resistance leader in the army of William the Silent.
- Leo: A strong red bearded sailor who is Gilles' best friend, even though he doesn't say much besides the word "Hee..." ("Hey...")
- Admiral Lumeij: Based on the real-life admiral, Lumeij is a tiny, self-absorbed man who always thinks he is the best, but is basically an idiot. He is so vain that he doesn't realize that he lacks talent and frequently takes credit for everything Gilles did for him.
- William the Silent: Based on the real-life Dutch national hero. He often sends Gilles, Leo and Lumeij out on secret missions.
- Cornelis Drebbel: Based on the real-life scientist, but depicted more as a mad scientist in the series.
- Fernando Álvarez de Toledo, 3rd Duke of Alba: Based on the real-life Spanish duke. He acts as the series' antagonist.
- Hertog Jan van Breda: A charming skirt chaser who is part of the nobility that surrounds William the Silent.
- De Bekketrekker ("The Facemaker"): A sadistic gang leader who works for the Spaniards, despite not being affiliated with them.
- 90-60-90: A female double spy in both the Spanish as well as the Dutch camps. She seduces every man she meets, save for Gilles who can resist her.

== Albums ==
- "De Struikrover" (2001) (Technically the first album, but released much later in the chronology.)
- "De Spaanse Furie" (1985)
- "Storm over Dubbeldam" (1987)
- "Smeerenburg" (1989)
- "De Revue" (1991)
- "De Batavia" (1993)
- "Spionage" (1995)
- "Willem de Zwijger" (1997)
- "De 7 Provinciën" (2000)
- "90-60-90" (2003)
