= Gregor Duncan =

Gregor Duncan may refer to:

- Gregor Duncan (artist) (1910–1944), American artist
- Gregor Duncan (bishop) (1950–2025), Scottish bishop
