= Kmoch =

Origin
- Language: Czech
- Meaning: godfather
- Region of origin: Czech Republic, Austria

Other names
- Variant form: Kmochan

Kmoch is a surname meaning godfather in Moravian dialect of Czech language.

Notable people with the surname include:

- František Kmoch (1848–1912), Czech composer and conductor
- Hans Kmoch (1894–1973), Austrian-American chess master and journalist
- Ladislaus Kmoch, Austrian cartoonist
