= Eyebeam (comic strip) =

American comic strip by Sam Hurt

- Author: Sam Hurt
- Current status/schedule: Concluded daily strip
- Launch date: (first run) c. 1978–1990
- End date: (second run) 1995–2002
- Publisher(s): Andrews McMeel Publishing, Blunt Books, Texas Monthly Press
- Genre(s): Humor, gag-a-day, satire, adults
- Followed by: Queen of the Universe

Eyebeam was a daily comic strip written and illustrated by Sam Hurt at the University of Texas at Austin. Unlike most college strips, its popularity led to a print life past Hurt's graduation.

== Publication history ==
The strip ran in the college's The Daily Texan from 1980 to 1990, though examples from 1978 to 1979 exist. In 1983, Austin's daily paper, the American-Statesman, picked up the strip. Other newspapers around the U.S. followed suit, although Eyebeam's family of subscribers was never greater than a few dozen.

By 1982, Eyebeam's popularity was such that a monster character called Hank the Hallucination ran for the University of Texas Student Government presidency (campaign slogan: "Get Real") and won. A figment of Eyebeam's imagination even within the boundaries of the comic, Hank received more votes than the two human candidates combined. After it was ruled that imaginary characters could not serve in the post, future Democratic adviser and CNN political contributor Paul Begala was the campus' second choice. Following his loss, Begala wrote a tongue-in-cheek complaint for the Texan, arguing "I cannot help but feel Hank's platform is illusory at best .... I must say that the candidate himself lacks substance."

The strip developed a devoted enough fanbase to support a steady series of paperback collections, as well as ancillary merchandise such as T-shirts.

=== Switch to Queen of the Universe ===
In 1990, Hurt discontinued the comic strip, taking an offer from United Feature Syndicate to start a new strip based on the Peaches character, Queen of the Universe. The strip was sometimes called Peaches, Queen of the Universe. Hurt's freewheeling style did not translate as well under the syndicated system, which was apparently hoping for a female Calvin character, and the latter strip was not a success. Hurt described the strip's demise as the result of "a printing accident... [it] drowned in a sea of red ink." Some readers felt the most Eyebeam-like sequences of the strip's run came at the very end, after Hurt had gotten the cancellation notice.

=== After Queen of the Universe ===
Sam Hurt revived Eyebeam in 1995, but as a weekly. A comic book series also appeared, combining reprints with fresh material. Hurt discontinued Eyebeam for a second time in 2002, and resumed it for a third time in 2006. As of 2008, the strip appears weekly in the Austin Chronicle as well as on Hurt's website.

== Story and characters ==
Beginning as a fairly typical "college life" strip, Eyebeam quickly mutated into something more. Besides the title character (a bemused, rail-thin law student and acceptor of weirdness) and the aforementioned Hank, regular characters included Eyebeam's down-to-earth but sexually voracious girlfriend Sally, and his best friend, the comical ne'er-do-well Ratliff McNubb. Secondary characters included the slacker robot IM4U, the narcissistic Rod Rutherford, Rod's lovestruck girlfriend Beth, and Eyebeam's coworker Vernon (who seemed to be missing the top of his head). Much later, Ratliff's rambunctious niece Peaches burst into the storylines, which indirectly led to the strip's demise.

== Style ==
A strip showing Eyebeam in the foreground, Rod and Beth in the background, and an object that changes from panel to panel: first a vase, then a pot, then a desk lamp, then a lava lamp.

Hurt's drawing style was thick and loose, and used periodically shifting backgrounds as were found in George Herriman's "Krazy Kat". A vase of flowers, for example, could be exchanged for an umbrella stand and then a fountain, without narrative explanation. The strip's logo was similarly ever-changing. Many of the strip's odder visual elements were accepted at face value, if discussed at all, such as Sally's endless jet stream of hair, Ratliff's sea-of-trash bedroom, or Ratliff's spherical automobile.

== Legacy ==
When the Comics Journal compiled its 2000 list of the greatest comics of the century, Eyebeam received one judge's vote.

Hurt remains in Austin, Texas, where he does animation and sculpture.

== Published collections ==
- 1982: I'm Pretty Sure I've Got My Death-Ray In Here SOMEWHERE (self-published)
- 1984: Eyebeam, Therefore I Am (Andrews McMeel Publishing) ISBN 978-0961166014
- 1985: Eenie Meenie Minie Tweed (Andrews McMeel) ISBN 978-0961166021
- 1985: Our Eyebeams Twisted (Blunt Books) ISBN 978-0961166038
- 1985: The Mind's Eyebeam (Andrews McMeel) ISBN 978-0836220865
- 1988: Teetering on the Blink (Texas Monthly Press) ISBN 978-0877191001
- 1988: Render Unto Peaches (Texas Monthly Press) ISBN 978-0877191155

A three-issue comic book series, Eyebeam: The Complete Collection 1978-1989, was released in 1992. The first of a three-volume compilation of Hurt's Queen of the Universe strip was released in 2012.

== Other uses ==
Eyebeam comics were extensively used in the American Bar Association's essay compilation Full Disclosure: Do You Really Want to Be a Lawyer? (Hurt received a Doctor of Jurisprudence degree from the University of Texas Law School in 1983.)

Characters from Eyebeam are animated by Sam Hurt in a music video by Brave Combo, "The Hokey Pokey". Sally, Eyebeam, Ratliff, and Hank appear.
