= Back at the Front =

1952 film by George Sherman

- Film poster
- Directed by: George Sherman
- Written by: Lou Breslow; Oscar Brodney; Don McGuire
- Based on: Willie and Joe by Bill Mauldin
- Produced by: Leonard Goldstein
- Starring: Tom Ewell; Harvey Lembeck; Mari Blanchard
- Cinematography: Clifford Stine
- Edited by: Paul Weatherwax
- Music by: Joseph Gershenson
- Production company: Universal-International
- Distributed by: Universal-International
- Release date: October 1952
- Running time: 87 minutes
- Country: United States
- Language: English
- Box office: $1.3 million (US rentals)

Back at the Front (titled Willie and Joe in Tokyo in the UK) is a 1952 American comedy film directed by George Sherman and starring Tom Ewell, Harvey Lembeck and Mari Blanchard, very loosely based on the characters Willie and Joe by Bill Mauldin. It is a sequel to Up Front (1951). Mauldin repudiated both films, and refused his advising fee.

== Plot ==
Willie and Joe are two U.S. Army veterans of World War II who got through the war by goldbricking. After returning to civilian life they are recalled to active duty and end up part of the post war occupation forces in Japan. Chaos ensues as they attempt one con job after another in order to avoid work details and get leave to spend time in Tokyo.

== Cast ==
- Tom Ewell as Willie
- Harvey Lembeck as Joe
- Mari Blanchard as Nina
- Richard Long as T/Sgt. Rose
- Gregg Palmer as Capt. White
- Barry Kelley as Brig. Gen. Dixon
- Russell Johnson as Johnny Redondo
- Vaughn Taylor as Maj. Lester Ormsby
- Aram Katcher as Ben
- Aen-Ling Chow as Sameko
- Benson Fong as Rickshaw boy
- Lane Bradford as Military Policeman
- Dee Carroll as Night Curse
- David Janssen as Soldier
