= Peter de Wit =

Dutch cartoonist and comics artist

Peter de Wit (born March 10, 1958, in Beverwijk) is a Dutch comics artist and cartoonist. He is best known for his comics series De Familie Fortuin, Sigmund and his collaborations with Hanco Kolk with whom he created the series Gilles de Geus and S1NGLE.

== Biography ==
De Wit debuted at the age of 17 with the comics series Jochem. He started working for the Dutch comics magazine Eppo, for whom he drew the comedic western comic Stampede, which was later renamed De Cowboys In 1983 De Wit started his long collaboration with Hanco Kolk. Together they made the humoristic historical comics series Gilles de Geus, the photo novel Mannetje & Mannetje (Sidekicks in English; 1988), which was adapted into a TV sketch show for VPRO in 1989 and the gag-a-day comic S1NGLE (2001), which was also adapted for television as a sitcom on NET 5. The men also presented an educational TV documentary series about drawing comics and cartoons for Teleac in 1992. They also made a comics adaptation of the TV series Laat Maar Zitten for VARA TV Magazine. In 1988 they founded their own publishing company De Plaatjesmaker.

His best known solo comics are De Familie Fortuin and Sigmund. De Familie Fortuin (1985-1999) was a gag comic about a dysfunctional and asocial family and was published in Eppo, Wordt Vervolgd, Sjors en Sjimmie Stripblad, and Sjosji Striparazzi. The scripts were written by Ruud Straatman until 1990, after which De Wit took over this work too In 1994 he introduced Sigmund, a black comedy gag-a-day about a cynical psychiatrist. This proved to be his breakthrough. He also made Het Mooiste Vak Ter Wereld (The Most Beautiful Profession of All Time) about a frustrated teacher in a high school.

He is the winner of the 1999 Stripschapprijs.

== Personal life ==
De Wit is the father of comedian Tex de Wit.
