= Pääkaupunki =

Finnish satirical comic

Pääkaupunki (Finnish for "capital city") is a Finnish political satire comic strip drawn by Tarmo Koivisto. It is published since 1997 on the back page of the Helsingin Sanomat monthly supplement.

Koivisto is more famous for Mämmilä, an ongoing tale about a fictional Finnish village, but during a multi-year hiatus in the series, he started drawing Pääkaupunki on the side.

The comic satirises current Finnish politics very sharply. Unlike traditional political satire comics, Pääkaupunki extrapolates possible future outcomes of today's politics, and takes them to the extreme, creating farcical visions. Most Finnish politicians, particularly Prime Minister Matti Vanhanen, are recognisable straight from their face, but the strip sometimes mentions the names of less-known politicians to help readers recognise them. Most of the comic happens in Helsinki (hence the name), but some strips are set in other places.
