= S1NGLE =

Dutch comic series

- Fatima (left), Nienke (center) and Stella (right)
- Author(s): Hanco Kolk, Peter de Wit
- Launch date: 2000
- Genre(s): Gag-a-day, romance comics

S1NGLE is a Dutch gag-a-day comic series, created in 2000 by Hanco Kolk and Peter de Wit. It centers on three women and their endless endeavours to find the right male partner. The popularity of the series inspired a TV sitcom series of the same name.

== Concept ==
S1NGLE is about three young women who work in a hospital and who often go on dates to find the perfect partner. A lot of comedy is provided by the girls' distinctive personalities, the type of men they meet and sexual situations.

S1NGLE is published in the Dutch newspapers Het Parool, De Gelderlander and Algemeen Dagblad, among some regional Dutch newspapers. In Belgium it is published in Gazet van Antwerpen and it has been published by HUMO too in the late 2000s. As of 2013, 15 albums are available, all published by De Harmonie.

== Characters ==
- Fatima Prins: A young woman with long, blonde hair who is somewhat naïve, but by far the most sympathetic character. She is often cruising for men behind her computer all night long, but her mother is usually the only one to visit her site.
- Nienke Meppelink: A more brawny and chubby young woman who wears glasses. She has a somewhat cynical and grumpy attitude. Several gags have her phoning her mother and usually insulting, threatening or guilt shaming her in the process. Another running gag is that people are frequently afraid of her when she has her menstrual period, because then she is extremely crabby and prone to shouting: "Ik ben heel erg ongesteld!" ("I'm very much on my period!").
- Stella Deporter: Stella is a slender young woman with long black hair. Because she is such an attractive woman she has countless one-night stands, to the frustration of Nienke and Fatima. Stella is flirtatious and very self-assured, though can get depressive when people think she is older than she looks (or even when they guess her correct age). She is also a smoker.
- Floor: Floor is a woman who was introduced to the cast in 2013. She is a self-important, freshly divorced mother with a seven-year-old daughter. Her name was chosen in a readers' poll.

== Television adaptation ==
From 2008 until 2010 the series was adapted into a TV sitcom, broadcast on NET 5, which ran for three seasons. Bracha van Doesburgh played the part of Fatima, Eva Van Der Gucht Nienke and Katja Schuurman Stella. The series was also exported to Germany, Austria, Belgium and Hungary.

== Legal issues ==
In 2004 Kolk and De Wit sued a magazine that also had the title S1NGLE in its name. The magazine was forced to disestablish itself on order of the judge for "untolerable copyright infringement".
