= Willie and Joe =

Fictional cartoon characters created by Bill Mauldin

Publicity shot of Willie and Joe, drawn by Bill Mauldin, 1940s.

Willie and Joe are stock characters representing United States infantry soldiers during World War II. They were created and drawn by American cartoonist Bill Mauldin from 1940 to 1948, with additional drawings later. They were published in a gag cartoon format, first in the 45th Division News, then Stars and Stripes, and starting in 1944, a syndicated newspaper cartoon distributed by United Feature Syndicate.

== History ==
Mauldin was an 18-year-old soldier training with the 45th Infantry Division in 1940. He cartooned part-time for the camp newspaper. Near the end of 1941 the Japanese attacked Pearl Harbor, and the US entered World War II. Mauldin was sent to combat, influencing his cartoons. They gradually became darker and more realistic in their depiction of the weariness of the enduring miseries of war. He extended the bristles on their faces and the eyes – "too old for those young bodies", as Mauldin put it – showed how much Willie and Joe suffered. In most cartoons, they were shown in the rain, mud, and other dire conditions, while they contemplated the whole situation.

In the early cartoons, depicting stateside military life in barracks and training camps, Willie was a hook-nosed, smart-mouthed Choctaw Indian, while Joe was his red-necked straight man. But over time, the two became virtually indistinguishable from each other in appearance and attitude.

While Mauldin was praised for his realistic depictions of what most soldiers felt during war-time, he was less popular with some officers, however. General George S. Patton, Jr. in particular felt offended by the cartoons. Mauldin was ordered to meet him in March 1945 in Patton's quarters in Luxembourg, where Patton complained about the scruffiness of the characters and blamed Mauldin for disrespecting the army and "trying to incite a mutiny". But Dwight Eisenhower, Supreme Commander European Theater, told Patton to leave Mauldin alone, because he felt that Mauldin's cartoons gave the soldiers an outlet for their frustrations. The War Department supported their syndication. The cartoons helped publicize the ground forces and showed the grim side of war, demonstrating that victory would require repeated sacrifices.

Stephen Ambrose, author of Band of Brothers, praised Mauldin's work: "More than anyone else, save only Ernie Pyle, he caught the trials and travails of the GI. For anyone who wants to know what it was like to be an infantryman in World War II, this is the place to start – and finish."

== Publication history ==
The cartoons were published in the 45th Division News from 1940 until November 1943, when the Mediterranean edition of the Stars and Stripes took them over. Starting April 17, 1944, Mauldin's editor arranged for syndication by United Feature Syndicate as Up Front. As of 1945, according to a Time report, the cartoons were published in 139 newspapers. The title changed to Sweatin' It Out on June 11, 1945, then Willie and Joe on July 30, 1945. The strip lasted until April 8, 1948.

Mauldin received two Pulitzer Prizes for cartooning, one in 1945 and one in 1959. By the end of the war, he also received the Army's Legion of Merit for his cartoons. Mauldin planned for Willie and Joe to be killed on the last day of combat, but Stars and Stripes staff dissuaded him. He tried to bring them into civilian life, but could not find a successful way to do that. He discusses this in his memoir, Back Home, in 1947.

Mauldin occasionally drew new cartoons of "Willie and Joe" after the war. He drew them to commemorate the funerals of people he admired, such as generals Omar Bradley and George C. Marshall and fellow cartoonist Milton Caniff.

Mauldin retired in 1991. The pair reappeared in a 1998 Veterans Day strip of the popular comic Peanuts, using art that had been copied out of a 1944 Willie and Joe panel. Charles M. Schulz, creator of Peanuts and himself a World War II Infantry combat veteran, was a personal friend of Mauldin's and considered him a hero.

== Availability ==
In March 2008, most World War II comics by Mauldin were published in a collected Fantagraphics Books edition.

== Legacy ==
The films Up Front (1951) and Back at the Front (1952) were based on Mauldin's Willie and Joe characters; however, when Mauldin's suggestions were ignored in favor of making a slapstick comedy, he returned his advising fee; he said he had never seen the result.

"Willie and Joe" were satirized as "Billie and Moe" by Warren Sattler in National Lampoon Presents The Very Large Book of Comical Funnies.

On Veterans' Day 1998, Willie and Joe appeared in the comic strip Peanuts in a strip that Mauldin drew with Charles M. Schulz.

On March 31, 2010, the United States Post Office released a first-class denomination "$0.44" postage stamp in Mauldin's honor depicting him with Willie & Joe.

Original Willie & Joe comics and other illustrations by Bill Mauldin are in the collections of the Pritzker Military Museum & Library.
