= The Jackson Twins =

American comic strip by Dick Brooks

- Author(s): Dick Brooks
- Current status/schedule: Concluded daily & Sunday gag panel
- Launch date: November 27, 1950
- End date: March 24, 1979
- Syndicate(s): McNaught Syndicate
- Genre(s): Teens, Soap opera

The Jackson Twins (begun November 27, 1950, ended March 24, 1979) was an American comic strip, created by Dick Brooks and distributed by the McNaught Syndicate. Warren Sattler was also a contributing artist for many years.

== Concept ==
The strip was centered on two identical-twin sixteen-year-old girls, Jill and Jan Jackson, and their lives and social adventures in fictional Gardentown. The twins were all-American girl types of that era, trim and pretty, tight with the popular crowd and paired with their (usually) regular boyfriends Wiffie and Nightowl. Their understanding parents were Jim and Julia, while their annoying ten-year-old brother Junior (the girls called him "Termite") was frequently a target. When bored with their social mastery, the twins would sometimes swap identities for a while, just to confuse everyone.

The genesis of The Jackson Twins was in an earlier comic strip by creator Brooks, Elmer Squee, which he drew for King Features from 1946–48; that strip contained two identical twin girls as supporting characters. Moving over to McNaught in 1950, Brooks merely changed their names and promoted the girls to star status, with the initial strip published on November 27, 1950.

The strip hit its peak in the mid-1960s, after which it lost readers from its seeming lack of social relevance in more turbulent times, and then lost more readers from attempts to remedy the first problem. (Notable, however, was one of the first comic strip examples of a stalker, in the form of a social misfit type who adored one of the twins from a perpetual distance, only to hire someone to attack the twins just so he could stage a rescue. The plan didn't work and the Jacksons returned to their world and he to his.)

=== Ending ===
Although not a top performer like Peanuts or Blondie (and was never adapted to radio, TV, films or even comic books), The Jackson Twins was popular enough to peak at some 350 papers in the 1960s. However, by 1979, it was seen in only about 60. In March of that year, Brooks (citing "family and health problems") decided to retire. In the last installment, published on Saturday, March 24, 1979, a "psychic" character named Chrissy predicts the strip's demise: "Lots an' lots friends are going to miss Jan an' Jill!" In the final panel (seemingly drawn by a different artist), the elated twins tell their mother that they've just been offered a two-month-long trip to Paris, all expenses paid. (The mother is dubious: "What do you think this is, some game they're playing?") McNaught cancelled the strip the next day, abruptly ending The Jackson Twins after nearly three decades.
