= Jarhead =

Jarhead is a slang term for members of the United States Marine Corps.

Jarhead may also refer to:

- Jarhead (book), Anthony Swofford's 2003 memoir of his experiences as a U.S. Marine in the First Gulf War
- Jarhead (film), the 2005 film adaptation of Swofford's book
