= List of newspaper comic strips =

The following is a list of comic strips. Dates after names indicate the time frames when the strips appeared. There is usually a fair degree of accuracy about a start date, but because of rights being transferred or the very gradual loss of appeal of a particular strip, the termination date is sometimes uncertain. In the event a strip has its own page, the originator of the strip is listed. Otherwise, all creators who worked on a strip are listed. Many of characters appeared in both strip and comic book format as well as in other media.

The word Reuben after a name identifies winners of the National Cartoonists Society's Reuben Award for Outstanding Cartoonist of the Year, but many of leading strip artists worked in the years before the first Reuben and Billy DeBeck Awards in 1946.

Webcomics are comic strips that exist only on the World Wide Web and are not created primarily for newspapers or magazines. Primary sites for webcomics are Modern Tales, Serializer and KeenSpot.

== Lists of comic strips ==
The following lists include only newspaper comic strips:

- List of newspaper comic strips A–F
- List of newspaper comic strips G–O
- List of newspaper comic strips P–Z

== See also ==
- Cartoonist
- Comic strip
- Doodle
- List of British comic strips
- List of webcomics
- Webcomic

== Sources ==
- Strickler, Dave. Syndicated Comic Strips and Artists, 1924–1995: The Complete Index Cambria, California: Comics Access, 1995. ISBN 0-9700077-0-1 at Internet Archive
