= Ladislaus Kmoch =

Ladislaus (Ludwig) Kmoch (1894-1971) was an Austrian cartoonist who published one of the first daily comic strips in Continental Europe, Tobias Seicherl for Das Kleine Blatt, a Social Democratic newspaper. It was also the first Austrian daily comic strip and the first to use speech balloons. It ran from 1930 to 1939.

Kmoch served in the Wehrmacht as a mapmaker, among other roles, and was taken prisoner by the English towards the end of the war. He then worked briefly in a Viennese porcelain factory and resurrected Tobias Seicherl for several Viennese newspapers from 1958 to 1961.

== Political views ==
For its first years, the eponymous character was depicted as a slogan-susceptible nationalist drunkard and his dog, Struppi, a voice of reason. First, Seicherel sympathized with the Heimwehr Movement and later with Hitler. Kmoch joined the then-illegal NSDAP in 1935 In 1934, competing political parties were banned by the new Dolfuss government and the newspaper was nationalized. The strip became mostly apolitical due to the change in political climate, until the Anschluss of 1938, when it became nationalist and pro-Nazi.

== Political cartoons ==
One of Kmoch's antisemitic political cartoons in 1939 depicted dozens of Jewish rats being expelled from Germany and refused by other countries. Similar imagery was later used in the infamous propaganda film, Der Ewige Jude, released the next year.
