= Das Kleine Blatt =

Newspaper published in Vienna, Austria (1927–1971)

- Type: Daily newspaper; Weekly newspaper
- Founded: 1 March 1927
- Ceased publication: 26 June 1971
- Language: German
- Headquarters: Vienna
- Country: Austria
- Sister newspapers: Arbeiter-Zeitung

Das Kleine Blatt (German: The Little Paper) was an Austrian newspaper which was published in Vienna. The paper was affiliated with the Social Democratic Workers' Party, known as the Social Democratic Party. It was started in 1927 and published until 1971 with some interruptions.

== History and profile ==
The first issue of Das Kleine Blatt appeared on 1 March 1927. It was started as a daily newspaper with a small format which was kept until 1944. The paper was inspired from the British penny press. Julius Braunthal was its founding editor-in-chief. Johann Hirsch and Karl Ausch were its editors. It was published by Vorwarts, a publishing company of the Social Democratic Workers' Party. Many inexperienced journalists were employed at Das Kleine Blatt, including Karl Hans Sailer, Marianne Pollak, Jakob Meth, Ludwig Wagner and Walter Süss. The main political cartoonist was Paul Humpoletz, who contributed a regular cartoon strip, as well as single front page cartoons. He was virulently anti-Nazi and fought against anti-semitism. He was forced to flee Vienna for Prague after the Anschluss (the Nazi invasion of Austria) in March 1938.

The goal of the paper was to make an indirect propaganda for social democracy with entertaining contributions. Das Kleine Blatt was not a theoretical publication like Arbeiter-Zeitung, another newspaper of the Social Democratic Workers' Party. However, it was an ardent critic of the Nazis claiming that the Nazi Party was the biggest enemy of the Austrian working class. In the first issue Das Kleine Blatt did not feature an editorial, but an illustration on its cover page. Ladislaus Kmoch's comic character Tobias Seicherl was published daily in the paper from 1930 becoming Austria's first daily comic strip. In the early period Das Kleine Blatt had a sports supplement.

From March 1933 Das Kleine Blatt and other Austrian publications were subject to state censorship. On 12 February 1934 the paper was banned, and Julius Braunthal left the paper. However, two weeks later it was revived as a state-backed newspaper for workers. In March 1938 the newspaper began to support the National Socialists. During this period it featured antisemitic cartoons.

On 31 August 1944 the paper was merged with another publication and was renamed as Kleine Wiener Kriegszeitung. It appeared under this title until 6 April 1945. After two-year hiatus it was restarted with its original title on 14 June 1947 as the weekly newspaper of the Social Democratic Party. Das Kleine Blatt ceased publication on 26 June 1971.

== Circulation and readership ==
In the first year Das Kleine Blatt sold nearly 136,000 copies. Its circulation was 200,000 copies in 1934.

In a study carried out in the 1930s it was found that of 1,320 Viennese female factory workers 48,2% read Das Kleine Blatt. Its readership rate was much higher than those of other Social Democratic Workers' Party publications Die Unzufriedene and Arbeiter-Zeitung of which readership rates were 21,4% and 28,8%, respectively.
