= Rose Is Rose =

American comic strip

- Rose Is Rose Sunday strip panel.
- Author: Pat Brady
- Illustrator(s): Pat Brady (1984–2004); Don Wimmer (2004-present)
- Current status/schedule: Active daily & Sunday strip
- Launch date: April 16, 1984
- Syndicate(s): United Feature Syndicate/United Media (1984–2011); Universal Uclick/Andrews McMeel Syndication (2011–present)
- Publisher: Andrews McMeel Publishing
- Genre: humor

Rose Is Rose is a syndicated comic strip, written by Pat Brady since its launch on April 16, 1984, and drawn since March 2004 by Don Wimmer. The strip revolves around Rose and Jimbo Gumbo, their son Pasquale, and the family cat Peekaboo. Rose and Jimbo are deeply in love with each other, sometimes exchanging love notes or kissing under the stars, and they dote fondly on Pasquale.

Rose Is Rose is unusual, especially in modern comic strips, in that it has a generally positive and cheerful outlook on life and deals heavily with the emotional states of its characters, especially Rose and Pasquale. Rose and sometimes Jimbo are drawn as little children to emphasize "inner child" experiences. Rose is sometimes shown leaning against her "let it be" tree when dealing with heavy burdens. The strip also features highly daring "camera angles" and perspectives, often giving the illusion through frames of real motion.

The strip often shows an alternate point of view based on the characters' fantasies. Rose often sees herself as Vicki, a biker chick, when faced with a conflict between selfish desire and social obligations, or when confronted with challenges to her usually mild-mannered personality. On the rare occasions when she and Jimbo are fighting, she usually sees herself locked away as a prisoner in a "dungeon of resentment." Jimbo, who would like his wife to gain weight, sometimes fantasizes about her being plump and round-faced. Pasquale's "dream ship" sequences get much play, as does his relationship with his beloved guardian angel or the bathtub's dreaded drain monster. Even Peekaboo has elaborate fantasies.

From the comic's debut in 1984 until the strip published on 9 August 1991, Pasquale spoke only in a 'phonetic baby talk.' Since then, all of the characters (save for Mimi) have been portrayed as speaking coherent English.

The comic is distributed by United Features Syndicate. As of 2005, Pat Brady has been nominated eight times for a Reuben Award by the National Cartoonists Society for Outstanding Cartoonist of the Year. He won the 2004 award in that category for the first time. The strip has also won the Religious Public Relations Council's Wilbur Award for Editorial Cartoon/Comic Strips.

== Characters ==
- Rose Gumbo - Wife and mother. Rather shy in public situations, she makes the lifestyle of an everyday housewife appear adventurous and highly glamorous. She is witty, well read, sews sweet costumes for her son, bakes brownies, takes in a sunset almost daily, and teases her husband with her strawberry shampoo. She can hold a pleasant conversation with anyone, from her next-door neighbor to the birds living in the tree in her front yard. She is always there with a huge hug to comfort her husband and son, and never misses a night to tuck her little Pasquale in bed. Like Jimbo fears spiders, Rose has a deep fear of dust mites, derived from when she once saw a magnified image of one, and in her vivid imagination they tend to take on rather exaggerated proportions.
- Jimbo Gumbo - Husband and father. From the way he dresses, apparently works at a blue collar job. Enjoys placing love notes all around the house and especially in his wife's tea cabinet. He's an all around handyman, takes out the garbage when asked, loves baseball, but fear prevents him from coaxing a spider out of the shower. Despite such admirable qualities, he needs a little advice from time to time, which he seeks from The Amazing Perplexin - an occasionally recurring character in the comic strip. Jimbo also finds women sexier if they are a bit on the heavy side and occasionally tries to get Rose to gain weight - much to Rose's dismay.
- Vicki the Biker - Rose's alter-ego. The adventurous biker chick, with a leather miniskirt and a rose tattoo on the outer thigh of each leg, who lives on the edge and takes all those risks that one can not quite get away with as a housewife. She loves jalapeños and rattlesnake chili. Most likely to be seen riding her Harley into the sunset.
- Pasquale Gumbo - Rose and Jimbo's son. Dreads having Jimbo cut his hair, as he occasionally instead cuts his ears. Loves to sit atop his cushy bed and look through his 3-D glasses at his comic books. Quite an inspiring Play-Doh artist, as well as an exemplary young student who loves school and getting homework, to the disdain of classmates. He and his cousin Clem become glued to the television set when Ranger Rory is on. He is timid about the bathtub drain monster and about playing baseball for his dad, but not so when it comes to sledding down the hill, doing cartwheels or catching fireflies. He is the only child of the Gumbo family and embodies the innocence that we only find in youth. Most of Pasquale's adventures take place with his guardian angel, his cousin Clem, or while he is fast asleep, flying about in his dreamship. And as with most young boys, his dad is his greatest hero. (In an interview, Pat Brady has stated that "Pasquale" was a childhood nickname given to him by a family priest, after the name of a character in the 1940s radio program Life with Luigi.)
- Peekaboo - The family cat. Aloof and good-naturedly disdainful of the humans in her life. Like most cats, she spends her days on the quest for belly rubs and the perfect sunny spot to snooze the day away in. She is also a sucker for "minty-fresh breath", craning her ever-extendable neck to capture the scent from her humans, and has an extraordinary ability to extend everything else in order to claim a favoured spot. Jimbo can not sit anywhere without Peekaboo getting in his lap. However, she also provides a more humorous side to the difficulties that cats and cat owners go through. She has a habit of getting her claws snagged on various objects, an incident referred to as a "claw snag".
- Clem - Pasquale's selfish cousin. Loves to tease Pasquale and play practical jokes on him, often engaging in one-upmanship with him; every toy he owns is always twice as spectacular as Pasquale's toys. His alter ego is the "Toweled Crusader". A running gag has Clem throwing water balloons or snowballs (depending on the season) at Pasquale on a semi-regular basis.
- Fanny - Rose's sister, Clem's mother. It appears that Clem gets his selfishness from his mother (as seen in a few strips where Rose goes back to her childhood).
- Mimi - The next door neighbors' baby girl who speaks in phonetics (though in early strips she only spoke in tiny peeps). Mimi spreads happiness and joy to those around her in that unique way that only toddlers can.
- Corky and Abby - Mimi's parents.
- Pasquale's guardian angel - Usually depicted as a ghostly copy of Pasquale with fairy wings and a robe who becomes a gigantic and fearsome warrior when any kind of disturbance appears. From time to time will go overboard, and will subsequently receive an admonishing call from "headquarters".
- Rose's Mother - Rose's mom, Pasquale's grandma (aka "Meemaw"). She turns up now and again via phone calls and visits in her RV. She is a large woman, which makes Jimbo wish Rose would become more like her mother. She also has her own biker-chick alter-ego.
- Ms. Harris - Pasquale's teacher, young, blonde and always happy.
- Murphy - One of several squirrels.

== Rose Is Rose books ==
- Brady, Pat. Full House. Toronto, ON : PaperJacks, 1985.
- Brady, Pat. Rose Is Rose: All Together Now. Toronto, ON : PaperJacks, c1986. ISBN 0-7701-0435-5
- Brady, Pat. Rose Is Rose: Light Moments. Toronto, ON: PaperJacks, c1987. ISBN 0-7701-0632-3
- Brady, Pat. Rose Is Rose: Good Clean Fun. Toronto, ON: PaperJacks, c1987. ISBN 0-7701-0511-4
- Brady, Pat. Rose Is Rose: It Takes Two to Tickle. NY: Pharos Books, c1986. ISBN 0-88687-342-8
- Brady, Pat. Rose Is Rose: Because I Said So! NY:Pharos Books, c1989. ISBN 0-88687-434-3
- Brady, Pat. She’s a momma, not a movie star : a Rose Is Rose collection. Kansas City, Missouri|Kansas City, MO : Andrews and McMeel, c1996. ISBN 0-8362-1087-5
- Brady, Pat. License to dream : a Rose Is Rose collection. Kansas City, MO. : Andrews McMeel, c1997. ISBN 0-8362-3664-5
- Brady, Pat. Peace of mind is a blanket that purrs. Nashville, Tennessee|Nashville, TN. : Rutledge Hill Press, c1998. ISBN 1-55853-615-9
- Brady, Pat. Rose Is Rose 15th anniversary collection. Kansas City, MO. : Andrews McMeel, c1999. ISBN 0-8362-8196-9
- Brady, Pat. Rose Is Rose in loving color : a collection of Sunday Rose Is Rose comics. Nashville, TN. : Rutledge Hill Press, 1999. ISBN 1-55853-788-0
- Brady, Pat. The irresistible Rose Is Rose : a collection of Rose Is Rose comics. Kansas City, MO. : Andrews McMeel Pub., c2000. ISBN 0-7407-0554-7
- Brady, Pat. High spirited Rose Is Rose : a collection of Rose Is Rose comics. Kansas City, MO. : Andrews McMeel, c2002. ISBN 0-7407-2367-7
- Brady, Pat. Rose Is Rose, right on the lips. Kansas City, MO. : Andrews McMeel, c2003. ISBN 0-7407-3955-7
- Brady, Pat. Rose Is Rose : Running on Alter Ego. Kansas City, MO. : Andrews McMeel, 2005. ISBN 0-7407-5127-1
- Brady, Pat. Red carpet Rose : a Rose Is Rose collection. Kansas City, MO. : Andrews McMeel, c2006. ISBN 978-0-7407-5700-6
- Brady, Pat. The enchanting Rose : a Rose Is Rose collection. Kansas City, MO. : Andrews McMeel Pub., LLC, 2007. ISBN 978-0-7407-6555-1
- Brady, Pat. 100% Whole Grin Rose Is Rose: A collection of Rose Is Rose comics. Kansas City, MO. : Andrews McMeel Pub., LLC, 2008 ISBN 978-0-7407-7094-4
- Brady, Pat. Peekaboo Planet: A collection of Rose Is Rose comics. Kansas City, MO. : Andrews McMeel Pub., 2009 ISBN 978-0-7407-8545-0
- Brady, Pat. Not Just Another Sweetheart Deal: A collection of Rose Is Rose comics. Kansas City, MO. : Andrews McMeel Pub., LLC, 2010 ISBN 978-0-7407-9777-4
