= Gregor Duncan (artist) =

American artist

Gregor Keane Duncan (February 12, 1910–May 28, 1944) was an American artist who specialized in pen-and-ink drawings for magazines, books and newspapers.

Born in Seattle, Washington, Duncan grew up in Sausalito, California, the son of Charles and Constance Duncan. Charles Duncan wore many hats during his career, working as a designer and illustrator, as well as the press agent for Joseph Strauss, the chief engineer on the Golden Gate Bridge. Constance Duncan, the sister of Western painter Maynard Dixon, was trained as a pianist. While Gregor Duncan received no formal art training from his famous uncle, he did work in his San Francisco studio as a "water boy", cleaning brushes, changing the water, etc. Duncan left Tamalpais High School before graduating, and started on the staff of the Sausalito News when he was 17 years old. Soon after, he moved across the bay to San Francisco to do sports and courtroom drawings for the San Francisco Call Bulletin. Duncan commuted from Sausalito to San Francisco, maintaining a small studio in the Montgomery Block in San Francisco.

== Magazines ==
The 23-year-old Duncan relocated in New York in 1933 and was soon hired by the original Life humor magazine. Duncan drew mostly political cartoons for Life, incorporating ink, litho crayon and watercolor. Most of Duncan's cartoons were very pro-Franklin D. Roosevelt and the New Deal, until the political tone of the magazine changed, forcing him to change the tenor of his work. The early Life ceased publishing in 1936, but Duncan continued working for many other magazines, including Judge, Literary Digest, Reader's Digest, Look, Collier's, Cosmopolitan and For Men Only. In addition, Duncan did illustrations for PM newspaper from its initial publication in 1940. Even while serving in the Army Air Corps, Duncan continued supplying PM with writings and illustrations.

=== Gallery ===
A New Deal political cartoon appearing in the May 1934 issue of Life magazine.

The June 1937 cover of Judge magazine by Duncan, featuring a self-portrait of the artist, as well as a portrait of Janice Karner, who would become Duncan's wife a year later.

A full page of illustrations from the November 13, 1940 issue of PM, featuring kids at the Thrift House Playground in New York City.

== Books ==
From 1939 to 1942, Duncan illustrated nine books, including his personal favorite, Wacky the Small Boy:

- The Devil and the Doctor, by David H. Keller. 1940. Simon & Schuster.
- Hail to Yesterday, by Mara Millar. 1941. Farrar & Rinehart.
- The Melforts Go to Sea, by Geraldine Pederson-Krag. 1941. Holiday House.
- None But the Brave, by Rosamond Van Der Zee Marshall. 1942. Houghton-Mifflin Company.
- Pardon Me for Pointing, by Arthur Kober. 1939. Simon & Schuster.
- Run! Run! An Adventure in New York, by Harry Granick. 1941. Simon & Schuster.
- Table for Four, by Jack Iams. 1939. Simon & Schuster.
- Treasure Island, by Robert Louis Stevenson. 1939. Published by Pocket Books, Inc.
- Wacky the Small Boy, by Fred Schwed, Jr. 1939. Simon & Schuster.

== World War II ==
During World War II, Duncan was drafted into the Army Air Corps in July 1942. He did his basic training in Atlantic City, New Jersey, and then worked in the office of Public Relations, spending time at Lowry Field in Colorado, Tarpon Springs, Florida, and Chanute Field in Illinois. His work consisted of drawings for manuals, public dissemination, and cartoon illustrations for military publications. Duncan joined the staff of Stars and Stripes on December 14, 1943, and was shipped to Algiers to work on the Mediterranean edition of the military paper. His work in Stars and Stripes consisted of everything from field studies to comic strips and included numerous courtroom drawings from the war crimes trials of the Vichy Government. Duncan was sent to Naples, Italy in March 1944, where he befriended Bill Mauldin, who wrote about Duncan in his 1972 memoir, The Brass Ring. In May 1944, Duncan was sent to Anzio, to work in the Stars and Stripes office under illustrator Ed Vebell. Duncan and Sgt. Jack Raymond left for the Anzio beach head on May 29, to gather material for a new series of drawings. With Duncan behind the wheel, the Jeep was struck by a German 88 shell, and Duncan was killed. His wife, Janice Duncan Goodhue, who was a volunteer with the American Red Cross, recalled:

A correspondent from the Chicago Sun Times sent a message that I was to come back to Naples immediately. When I arrived, he was on the dock to tell me that Gregor had been killed at Anzio. There was nothing to do. We walked around, and he took me to a black market Italian restaurant for lunch. We drank and drank and ate something and drank. That night there was a gathering of Stars and Stripes people in a bombed-out village. A Yank correspondent had just returned from Yugoslavia with a British correspondent—they had had a meeting with Tito and the partisans up in the mountains, and they had just come back to Italy. I was semi-here and not here, because I was still in a state of shock. And yet, you get around. You're on your feet, and you keep going. That whole evening took me out of myself and Gregor and everything, and I was listening to them tell about their meeting with Tito. That was May of 1944. Once Gregor was gone, I could not work again in an enlisted men's club, because—and rightfully so—they talked about how much they hated the war, and how they wanted to go home. I knew that I couldn't handle that anymore, so I asked to be reassigned and was sent to a hospital unit, the 38th Evacuation Hospital. It was in Rome and had been at Anzio. Everyone there was weary. I have pictures of them. They were in a daze, having been in Anzio so long.... After Pisa, I left Italy, because I'd been overseas 18 months and the situation was so grim. Following Gregor's death I had become particularly sensitive and angry. I might have had battle fatigue just like the veterans. Anyway, I was not good for anything anymore, so it was time to go. When I got back to the states it was Christmastime, 1944.

Upon hearing of Duncan's death, Lieut. Gen. Mark Clark, Commander of the 5th Army, wrote to his widow:

I have just been notified of the death of your husband, Staff Sergeant Gregor K. Duncan, near Cori, Italy, while engaged in his duties as staff artist for the Stars and Stripes on May 29, 1944. I am deeply shocked at this loss to the 5th Army and to The Stars and Stripes and its readers. I have been an admirer of Sergeant Duncan’s work and know that his loss will be felt by all American soldiers fighting in Italy. We must face this tragedy with the knowledge that he paid the supreme price in making a very real and selfless contribution to this bitter but successful campaign to crush Nazi tyranny.
