= Pat Brady (cartoonist) =

American cartoonist (born 1947)

Pat Brady (born October 12, 1947, in Louisville, Kentucky) is an American cartoonist and creator of the comic strip Rose Is Rose, syndicated by United Feature Syndicate since 1983.

== Early life and career ==
Brady started cartooning at the age of five, drawing cartoons during Roman Catholic mass. He was nicknamed "Pasquale" by the priest. Brady graduated from the University of Wisconsin–Madison in 1969 with a major in art. He won the Reuben Award for Outstanding Cartoonist of the Year for 2004.

== Career ==
Prior to Rose Is Rose, Brady created a comic strip named Dreamer, but it was rejected by every publisher who saw it. Brady created Graves, Inc. which was syndicated briefly by the Register and Tribune Syndicate in the early 1980s. At its peak, Graves, Inc. was included in 30 papers, then went down to 11 and, after a three-year run, was canceled by the syndicate.

Brady was described by Pearls Before Swine cartoonist Stephan Pastis as "the nicest guy in cartooning".
