= Hanco Kolk =

Dutch cartoonist

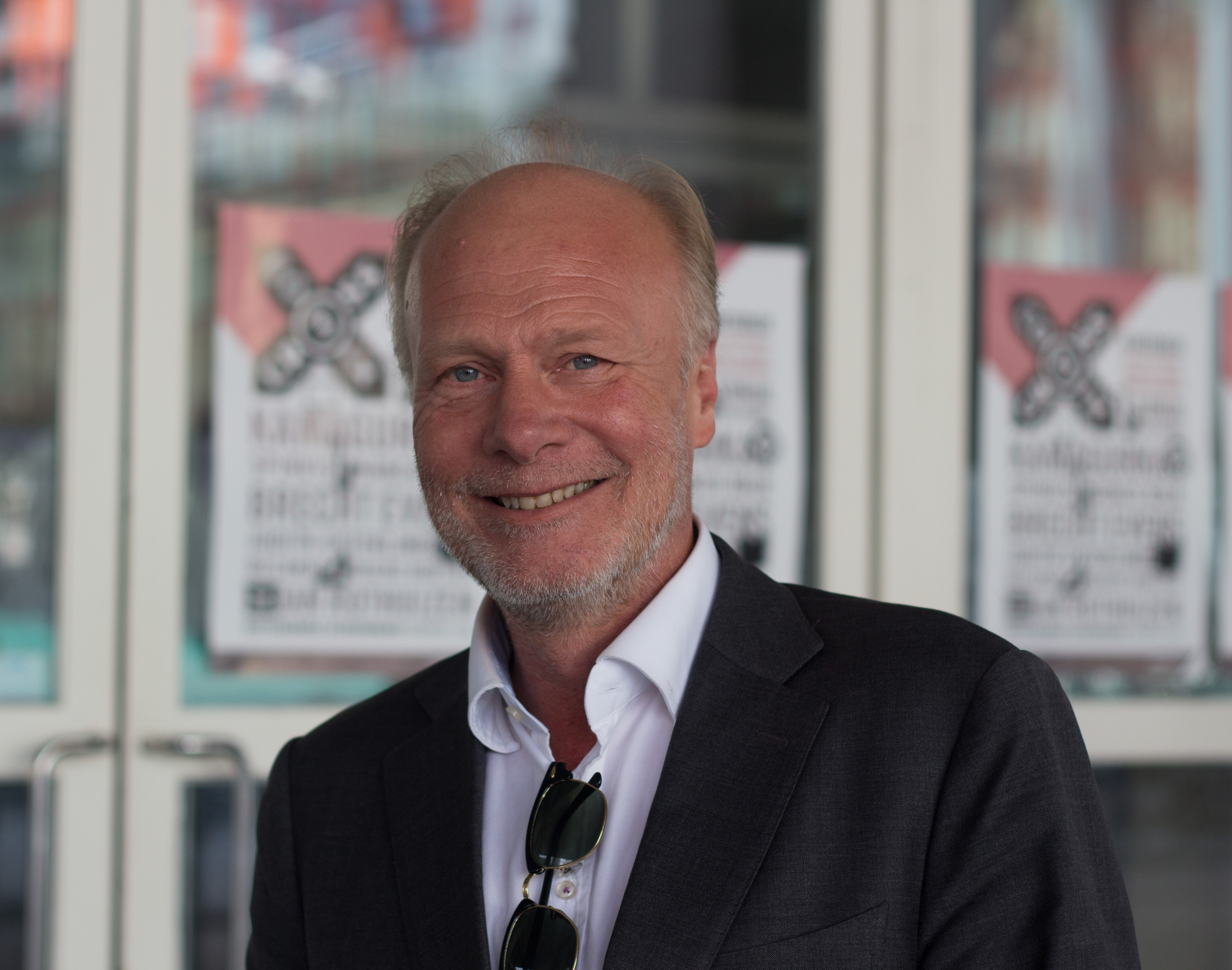
Hanco Kolk, 2016

Hanco Kolk (born 11 March 1957, Den Helder) is a Dutch cartoonist and comics artist. He is best known for his collaborations with Peter de Wit, with who he made Gilles de Geus and S1NGLE

Kolk married author Isabelle Rosselin in 2016.

== Biography ==
Kolk made his debut in the Dutch underground comics magazine Tante Leny presenteert!. In 1980 he was one of the founders of Studio Arnhem, a collective of comics artists and writers. After working anonymous for the magazine Donald Duck for several years he went to the magazine Eppo, where he made the humoristic historical adventure comics series Gilles de Geus together with Peter de Wit from 1983 to 2003. Kolk and De Wit often work together and have created comics such as the photo novel Mannetje & Mannetje (Sidekicks in English; 1988), which was adapted into a TV sketch show for VPRO in 1989 and the gag-a-day comic S1NGLE (2001), which was also adapted for television as a sitcom on NET 5. The men also presented an educational TV documentary series about drawing comics and cartoons for Teleac in 1992. They also made a comics adaptation of the TV series Laat Maar Zitten for VARA TV Magazine. In 1988 they founded their own publishing company De Plaatjesmaker.

A solo creation by Kolk is his 1992 strip Meccano, which had tremendous success in France. This abstract and stylistic comic set in a fictional country loosely based on Monaco, satirizes the rich and famous. and Inspecteur Netjes (1989) for Sjors and Sjimmie Magazine (which later became Sjosji Striparazzi) It was originally published in L'Echo des Savanes and won Kolk enormous acclaim.

He also created the gag-a-day comic Cor Daad in 1984 until 1998 for the Dutch children's magazine Taptoe. and Inspecteur Netjes (1989) for Sjors and Sjimmie Magazine (which later became Sjosji Striparazzi) In 2006 he drew a series of cartoons for the magazine The New Yorker. In the 2000s he made several autobiographical comics, many about travels to foreign countries like his journalistic voyage from Istanbul to Bagdad in 2010 with Dutch author Arnon Grunberg.

Kolk also writes comics series for other artists, such as Falco & Donjon for Uco Egmond, De Muziekbuurters for Ben Westervoorde, De Familie Sloterdijk for Michiel de Jong and De Kleine Dood for Hans van Oudenaarden. He is also active as a painter and restyled the children's section in the Academic Hospital in Maastricht. He also designed the album cover of Spinvis' record Tot ziens, Justine Keller.

Kolk is the winner of the 1996 Stripschapprijs.
