= Those Were the Days (comic strip) =

American comic strip by Art Beeman

Those Were the Days is an American weekly comic strip drawn by Art Beeman which was syndicated by the Al Smith Feature Service from 1951 to 1983.

The strip compared life in earlier times, apparently the late 19th century or very early 20th century, with "modern life", at the time of the strip's popularity, the 1950s and 1960s. The title of the strip was printed in an antique typeface. Between the "olden days" panel and the "modern" panel were the words, "But Now - Wow!", emphasizing the contrast between mores of different generations.
