= Swamp (comic strip) =

Australian comic strip

Swamp is a comic strip created by Australian Gary Clark. It was first published in 1981 in the Sunshine Coast Daily. According to Clark, the inspiration and model for this strip was the creeks and lagoons in a bushy suburban Brisbane where he grew up in the 1960s. He describes the strip as a "down-to-earth look at a bewildered society thriving in an ever-increasing complex world".

The popular characters in the comic strip are : Ding Duck, Wart & Mort Frog, Old Man Croc, Bob Crayfish, The Dung Beetles, Air Traffic Controller, The Ants, The Bludgerigar. Ding Duck and the Air Traffic Controller are popular worldwide in aviation circles. Wart & Mort Frog are popular with organisations and websites that promote water quality and sustainability and a clean, green environment. The Swamp characters appear on upscale casual and sportswear especially golf sportswear in Japan and South Korea.

The comic strip is syndicated to newspapers throughout Australia, New Zealand and Europe and translated into seven languages.

Gary Clark has won 14 Stanley Awards for Best Comic Strip Artist of the Year including the inaugural award presented by Prime Minister Bob Hawke. Also, Clark has won 11 Rotary National Cartoon Awards. His company, Swamp Productions Pty Ltd was nominated for export achievement in Arts/Entertainment category in the Premier of Queensland Awards in 1999 for export achievement to Japan.

Early in his cartooning career, Gary Clark created the popular Diesel Dog cartoon featured in Truckin' Life magazine in Australia. He relinquished creating Diesel Dog cartoons for over 20 years and in 2011 was requested by Truckin' Life to being Diesel's creator once again.

In August 2013, the comic strip was reported to have stopped syndication in News Corporation papers in Australia as a cost saving measure, but remains syndicated elsewhere.
