= Up Front (film) =

1951 film by Alexander Hall

- Film poster
- Directed by: Alexander Hall
- Screenplay by: Stanley Roberts
- Produced by: Leonard Goldstein
- Starring: David Wayne; Tom Ewell; Marina Berti
- Cinematography: Russell Metty
- Edited by: Milton Carruth
- Music by: Joseph Gershenson
- Production company: Universal-International
- Distributed by: Universal-International
- Release date: March 5, 1951
- Running time: 92 minutes
- Country: United States
- Language: English
- Box office: $1.95 million (U.S. rentals)

Up Front is a 1951 American comedy film directed by Alexander Hall and starring Tom Ewell and David Wayne. The script is very loosely based on Bill Mauldin's World War II characters Willie and Joe. Mauldin repudiated the film and refused his advising fee, and he claimed never to have seen the film. It takes place during the Italian campaign of World War II.

== Plot ==
On the Italian front, lowbrow G.I.s Willie and Joe are good soldiers in combat but reply to the antics of gung-ho Captain Johnson and other military snafus with a barrage of wry comments. On a three-day pass that Willie and Joe enjoy in Naples, Joe's penchant for wine and women involves them with luscious Emi Rosso and her moonshiner father, whose tangled affairs land them in ever deeper trouble.

== Production ==
Editorial cartoonist Bill Mauldin sold the film rights for Up Front to International Pictures in 1945, receiving assurance from producer William Goetz that he would maintain creative control. Frustrated with the quality of Hollywood war films, Mauldin was determined for Up Front to be "the first honest war picture." Brothers John and Ring Lardner Jr. were hired to write the screenplay. However, production was delayed and eventually shelved when Universal Pictures acquired International Pictures, with the executives believing that public interest in war films had diminished.

Production was restarted in 1949, but Lardner's involvement as one of the Hollywood Ten posed a political risk for the studio. The script was rewritten by Stanley Roberts and the promise of Mauldin's creative role was rescinded.

David Wayne was loaned from Twentieth Century-Fox for his role.

== Cast ==
- David Wayne as Joe
- Tom Ewell as Willie
- Marina Berti as Emi Rosso
- Jeffrey Lynn as Capt. Ralph Johnson
- Richard Egan as Capa
- Maurice Cavell as Vuaglio
- Vaughn Taylor as MP Maj. Lester
- Silvio Minciotti as Poppa Rosso
- Paul Harvey as Col. Akeley
- Roger De Koven as Sabatelli
- Grazia Narciso as Signora Carvadossi
- Tito Vuolo as Tarantino
- Mickey Knox as Driver
- Hal Baylor as Smitty
- John Doucette as Walsh
- William Frambes as Rogers
- Henry Rowland as Krausmeyer
- Kenneth Tobey as Cooper
- Arthur Space as Col. Hayes
- James Seay as Lt. Ferguson
- Harlan Warde as Lt. Myers
- Selmer Jackson as General
- Eugene Borden as French Captain
- Vito Scotti as Sergeant Clerk
- John McGuire as Military Police Lieutenant
- James Flavin as Military Policeman
- Peter Graves as Military Policeman
- Ann Tyrrell as Nurse
- Midge Ware as Nurse
- Gino Corrado as Waiter
- Lucille Barkley as Nurse Receptionist
- Pat Carroll as Italian Girl

== Reception ==
In a contemporary review for The New York Times, critic Bosley Crowther wrote: "[D]o not expect the same terse humor and bitter irony of Mauldin's great cartoons to well up in the uninspired conniptions of this average service comedy. For the simple fact is that Stanley Roberts, who put together the picture's moot screen play, failed to bring into realization the genuine flavor and spirit of Willie and Joe. ... Furthermore, Mr. Roberts has picked up from the myriad Mauldin cartoons many of the pictured situations and has spliced them into his plot, with the tag-lines carefully planted in the dialogue. It is not hard to spot the derived lines. They have an acid quality. ... But there the association with Mr. Mauldin ends and the creation of a scriptwriter and a slapstick intention begins. For 'Up Front,' as herein developed, might better be called 'Back Behind,' since it is mainly a romp with two loose 'doughfeet' in Naples while AWOL."
