= Rymy-Eetu =

Rymy-Eetu was a Finnish comic strip drawn by Erkki Tanttu, from 1930 to 1973 The titular character Rymy-Eetu is a strong, heavily built man, who is capable of apparently superhuman actions both in wartime and in peacetime.

== Characters ==
Rymy-Eetu was named after his strength and virility, although he was never much of a troublemaker. Sometimes he even seems to control the forces of nature. Sometimes his boisterous character gets him into trouble, but even in tight spots he always manages to keep smoking his pipe. Rymy-Eetu's frequent antagonist is his cousin Kalle Kuikkaneva, a short man wearing eyeglasses, who sometimes wins over Rymy-Eetu because of his cleverness.

== Appearance ==
Rymy-Eetu first appeared in Nuori Voima in 1930. At that time the character didn't have a name. After this, the comic appeared in Kansan Kuvalehti, where Ilmari Turja invented a name for the new hero.

Rymy-Eetu appeared, with short breaks, for about four decades. Suomen Kuvalehti started re-publishing coloured Rymy-Eetu strips from Kansan Kuvalehti. In all, the strip appeared in the following magazines: Nuori Voima (1930 and 1935), Kansan Kuvalehti (1931-1935 and 1945-1954), Hakkapeliitta (1936-1944), Radiokuuntelija-Antenni (1955-1968), Käytännön Maamies (1970s) and Suomen Kuvalehti (2007).

Otava published Rymy-Eetu albums from 1938 to 1968. In the albums, Tauno Karilas added rhyming text to the comics, which wasn't present in the original strips. Tanttu seldom wrote any text to his comic, but instead let the images do the talking. Sometimes a speech bubble helped in the narrative.

In wartime, Rymy-Eetu was used in propaganda. Rymy-Eetu crushed his Russian enemies completely in the comics.

After the Moscow Armistice, the Finnish publishing association sent a request to book stores to withdraw 288 works from display and sales. Along these works were the albums Rymy-Eetu ja Hymy-Freetu and Rymy-Eetun jymyvoitto. In 1999, Otava published a collection album called Rymy-Eetu ryssän kauhu, which included all four Rymy-Eetu albums published during wartime.

== Named after Rymy-Eetu ==
In Helsinki, there is a Bavarian cuisine style restaurant called Rymy-Eetu (opened in January 2008), which has a varying exhibition about the character.
