= Tobias Seicherl =

Tobias Seicherl is the title character of a comic drawn by Viennese caricaturist Ladislaus Kmoch (alias Ludwig Kmoch, 1897–1971), a self-taught cartoonist. The comic appeared as a daily strip in the Austrian tabloid Das Kleine Blatt published by Vorwärts-Verlag from October 5, 1930. Tobias Seicherl can be regarded as the first continental European daily comic strip.

The comic strip has been written in Viennese and was one of the first European comics featuring balloons. ‘Seicherl’ has two meanings in Viennese, which are semantically connected. The original meaning of ‘small sieve’ later gave rise to the second meaning of 'weakling'; someone who lacks moral character - letting everything ‘sieve straight through’ them.

== Main characters ==
Tobias Seicherl, a typical petit bourgeois, was drunk on many occasions and often took to strolling through the streets of Vienna with his walking stick, pipe and dog named Struppi. It's somewhat ironic that the dog was the voice of reason in this strip. Little was known or discussed about Seicherl’s career or his living conditions, which made him the ideal person with which social-democratic readers could identify themselves, helping to vent their frustrations toward the bourgeois of the time.

== History ==
Between 1930 and 1939, the comic was published on a daily basis in Das Kleine Blatt, although sporadically so into the first part of 1940. The series was politically orientated between the years 1930–1934, in which Tobias Seicherl was seen to sympathize with Adolf Hitler. However, from 1934 onwards, with the introduction of the Austro-fascist dictatorship, Seicherl inevitably became unpolitical. By the end of the 1930s the strip displayed some nationalistic tendencies.

Tobias Seicherl was so popular that special edition volumes have been published as early as 1933.

After the closing days of WWII attempts were made to revive the comic strip. From 1958 to 1961, the Seicherl series appeared in a variety of different Viennese newspapers yet was unable to once again achieve the high point of its earlier success.
