= Warren Sattler =

American artist and cartoonist (born 1934)

- Born: September 7, 1934 (age 92) Connecticut, US
- Areas: Cartoonist, Artist
- Notable works: Grubby
- Awards: Meriden Hall of Fame, 2003

Warren Sattler (born September 7, 1934) is an American illustrator and cartoonist, who contributed work to many popular publications from the early 1960s through the 1990s.

== Biography ==
Sattler was born on September 7, 1934, in Connecticut. In the 1960s, he assisted on the comic strips Barnaby and The Jackson Twins. Sattler also drew comics that appeared in Help magazine under the direction of Harvey Kurtzman. His own strip, Grubby, ran from 1964 to 1997 (syndicated by the Al Smith Service).

In the 1970s, Sattler produced art for comic books, in particular Charlton Comics. Some titles he worked on include Billy the Kid, Fightin' Army, Fightin' Marines, Ghost Manor, Ghostly Haunts, and Yang. Additionally, he worked as an illustrator for Cracked magazine, National Lampoon, and Playboy. Sattler created a second syndicated comic strip in 1980: Swamp Brats, a Sunday comic. He ghosted on such newspaper strips as Bringing Up Father, Comics for Kids and Gil Thorp during the 1980s and 1990s.

== Awards ==
In 2003, he was inducted into the Meriden Hall of Fame.
