= Tarmo Koivisto =

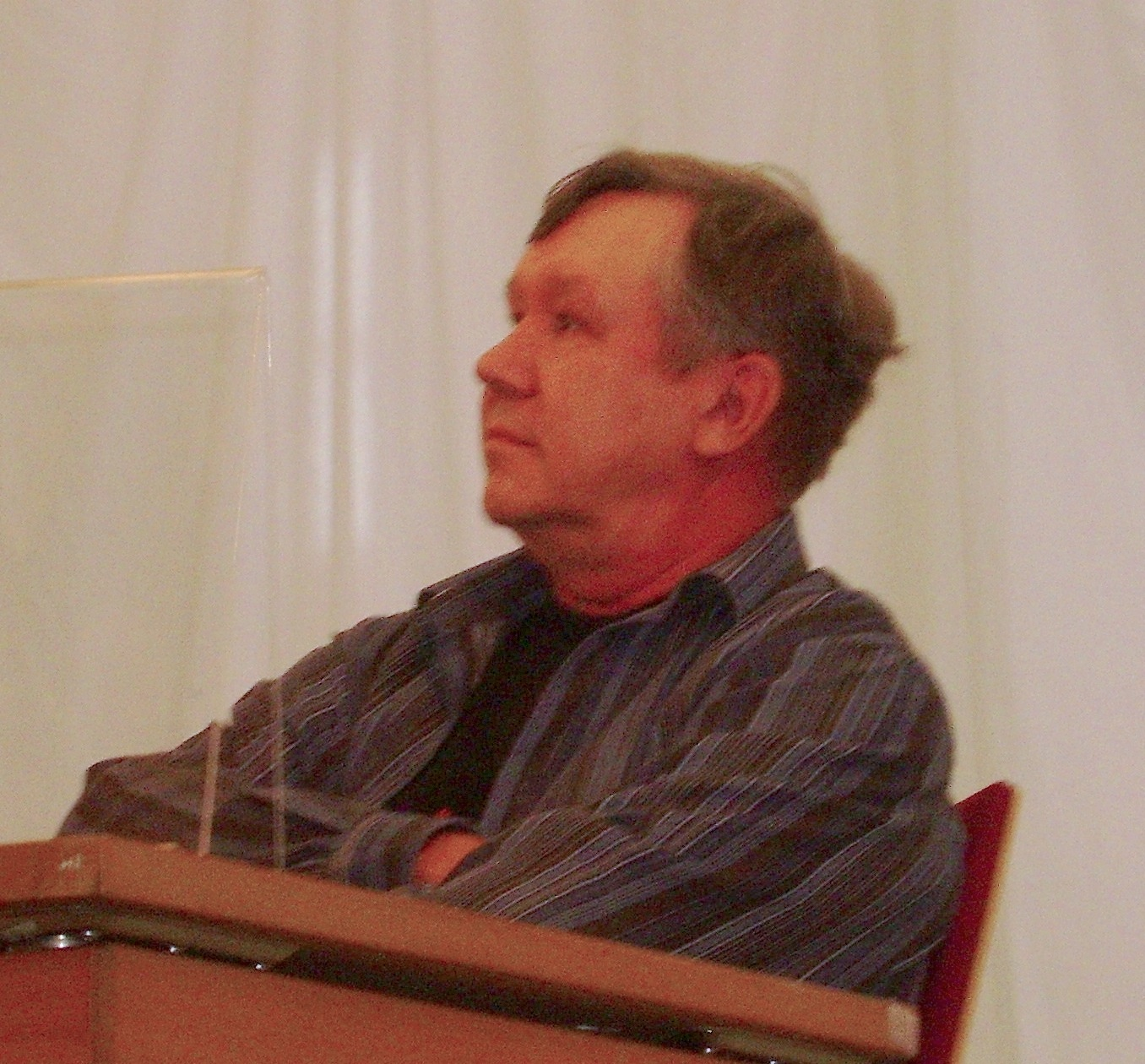
Tarmo Koivisto (2008)

Tarmo Koivisto (born 3 July 1948 in Orivesi) is a Finnish comics artist and writer, cartoonist, and graphic artist.
