= Gag-a-day =

Style comic strip

A gag-a-day comic strip is the style of writing comic cartoons such that every installment of a strip delivers a complete joke or some other kind of artistic statement. It is opposed to story or continuity strips, which rely on the development of a story line across a sequence of installments. Most syndicated comics are of this type. Another term for this distinction is non-serial (gag-a-day) vs. serial strips.

Compared to single-panel cartoons ("gag panels"), gag-a-day comic strips can deliver a better timing for the narrative of a joke.

The distinction between continuity and gag-a-day strip may be blurred: a continuous story may still be delivered in the gag-a-day format. In fact, Lynn Johnston recommends it for story strips, to keep the readership and engage new audiences which may not be very familiar with the background of the story.

== See also ==
- Yonkoma – A four-panel comic strip format often used for gag-a-day cartoons
