= Bell Syndicate =

Early print syndication service

- Formerly: Bell Syndicate-North American Newspaper Alliance; Bell-McClure Syndicate
- Type: Subsidiary
- Industry: Print syndication
- Predecessor: Wheeler Syndicate
- Founded: 1916; 110 years ago
- Founder: John Neville Wheeler
- Defunct: 1972; 54 years ago
- Fate: absorbed into United Feature Syndicate
- Headquarters: 229 West 43rd Street, New York City, New York, U.S.
- Area served: United States
- Key people: John Neville Wheeler (1916–1966); Kathleen Caesar (editor); Henry M. Snevily (president); Joseph P. Agnelli (executive VP & GM); Muriel Agnelli a.k.a. Muriel Nissen (columnist); Louis Ruppel (President & Editor, 1952–c. 1958)
- Products: columns, fiction, feature articles, and comic strips
- Owners: North American Newspaper Alliance (1930–1966); Koster-Dana (1966–1972); United Features Syndicate (1972)
- Subsidiaries: Metropolitan Newspaper Service (1920–1930); Associated Newspapers (1930–c. 1966); McClure Syndicate (1952–1972)

The Bell Syndicate, launched in 1916 by editor-publisher John Neville Wheeler, was an American syndicate that distributed columns, fiction, feature articles and comic strips to newspapers for decades. It was located in New York City at 247 West 43rd Street and later at 229 West 43rd Street. It also reprinted comic strips in book form.

== History ==
=== Antecedent: the Wheeler Syndicate ===
In 1913, while working as a sportswriter for the New York Herald, Wheeler formed the Wheeler Syndicate to specialize in distribution of sports features to newspapers in the United States and Canada. That same year his Wheeler Syndicate contracted with pioneering comic strip artist Bud Fisher and cartoonist Fontaine Fox to begin distributing their work. Journalist Richard Harding Davis was sent to Belgium as war correspondent and reported on early battlefield actions, as the Wheeler Syndicate became a comprehensive news collection and distribution operation. In 1916, the Wheeler Syndicate was purchased by S. S. McClure's McClure Syndicate, the oldest and largest news and feature syndicate in America. (Years later, Wheeler's company would in turn acquire the McClure Newspaper Syndicate.)

=== Foundation of the Bell Syndicate ===
Immediately upon the sale of his Wheeler Syndicate, John Neville Wheeler founded the Bell Syndicate, which soon attracted Fisher, Fox, and other cartoonists.

Ring Lardner began writing a sports column for Bell in 1919.

=== Mergers and acquisitions ===
In the spring of 1920, the Bell Syndicate acquired the Metropolitan Newspaper Service (MNS), continuing to operate it as a separate division. MNS launched such strips as William Conselman's Good Time Guy and Ella Cinders, and the Tarzan comic strip. In March 1930, United Feature Syndicate acquired MNS and its strips from the Bell Syndicate.

In 1924, Wheeler became executive editor of Liberty magazine, and served in that capacity while continuing to run the Bell Syndicate.

In 1930, Wheeler became general manager of North American Newspaper Alliance (NANA), established in 1922 by 50 major newspapers in the United States and Canada which absorbed Bell, both continuing to operate individually under joint ownership as the Bell Syndicate-North American Newspaper Alliance. That same year, Bell acquired Associated Newspapers, founded by S. S. McClure's cousin Henry Herbert McClure. Keeping Associated Newspapers as a division, at that point the company became the Bell-McClure Syndicate.

In 1933, just as the concept of "comic books" was getting off the ground, Eastern Color Printing published Funnies on Parade, which reprinted in color several comic strips licensed from the Bell-McClure Syndicate, the Ledger Syndicate, and the McNaught Syndicate, including the Bell Syndicate & Associated Newspaper strips Mutt and Jeff, Cicero, S'Matter, Pop, Honeybunch's Hubby, Holly of Hollywood, and Keeping Up with the Joneses. Eastern Color neither sold this periodical nor made it available on newsstands, but rather sent it out free as a promotional item to consumers who mailed in coupons clipped from Procter & Gamble soap and toiletries products. The company printed 10,000 copies, and it was a great success.

An April 1933 article in Fortune described the "Big Four" American syndicates as United Feature Syndicate, King Features Syndicate, the Chicago Tribune Syndicate, and the Bell-McClure Syndicate.

The Bell Syndicate was one of the many syndicates that rejected Jerry Siegel in 1934 when he proposed a Superman comic strip. The syndicate stated, "We are in the market only for strips likely to have the most extraordinary appeal, and we do not feel that Superman gets into that category." (Superman's subsequent debut in Action Comics #1 in 1938 was a huge success.)

The Bell Syndicate-North American Newspaper Alliance acquired the McClure Newspaper Syndicate in September 1952 — making it the second McClure-family-owned syndicate to be acquired by Bell — with Louis Ruppel installed as president and editor.

The syndicate's greatest success with comic strips was in the 1920s, 1930s, and 1940s. The company had some strips in syndication through the 1950s but the only ones to have success into the 1960s were Uncle Nugent's Funland, Hambone's Meditations and Joe and Asbestos.

In 1964, the publishing and media company Koster-Dana Corporation was identified as controlling both North American Newspaper Alliance and the Bell-McClure Syndicate. and by 1970 the syndicate was no longer distributing comic strips.

=== Final years ===
In 1972, United Features Syndicate acquired NANA / Bell-McClure and absorbed them into its syndication operations.

== Bell Syndicate / Bell-McClure Syndicate strips and panels ==
- Beauregard by Jack Davis (1961) — never successfully syndicated and soon dropped
- Beautiful Babs by Chic Young (July 15, 1922–c. Nov. 1922)
- Ben Webster's Career by George Storm (1925–1926)
- Betty by Charles Voight (c. 1919-c. 1920) — Sunday-only strip; moved to the New York Herald Tribune Syndicate
- Bullwinkle by Al Kilgore (July 23, 1962 – 1965)
- Cash and Carrie - Lou Skuce (c. 1926)
- Cicero's Cat (Cicero) - Bud Fisher and then Al Smith (1930s-1940s)
- Dan Flagg by Don Sherwood (c. 1966–July 5, 1967) — originally with the McNaught Syndicate
- Don Winslow of the Navy - Ken Ernst (1934–1955)
- Famous Fiction by J. Carroll Mansfield, Chad Grothkopf, Harry Anderson, Jack Binder, and Barye Phillips (1940–1946) — weekly serial adaptations of famous works of literature, including The Murders in the Rue Morgue (23 July 1944-27 Aug 1944), The Legend of Sleepy Hollow (3 Sept 1944-8 Oct 1944), A Midsummer Night's Dream (15 Oct 1944-5 Nov 1944), Arabian Nights — "The Fisherman and the Genie" (12 Nov 1944-17 Dec 1944), Hansel and Gretel (24 Dec 1944-28 Jan 1945), Treasure Island (4 Feb 1945-25 Mar 1945), Strange Case of Dr Jekyll and Mr Hyde (1 Apr 1945-20 May 1945), The Seventh Voyage of Sinbad the Sailor (27 May 1945 – 15 July 1945), Huckleberry Finn's Trip Down the Mississippi (July 22, 1945-9 Sept 1945), A Connecticut Yankee in King Arthur's Court (16 Sept 1945-4 Nov 1945), Aladdin's Lamp (11 Nov 1945-30 Dec 1945), The Minotaur (6 Jan 1946-1946), and King Arthur (1946-19 May 1946)
- Flyin' Jenny by Russell Keaton (1939–1946)
- Fu Manchu by Leo O'Mealia (1931–1933)
- Funnyman - Jerry Siegel and Joe Shuster (1948)
- Gentlemen Prefer Blondes - Anita Loos, Virginia Huget and Phil Cook (1926)
- Hambone's Meditations - originally by James Pinckney Alley and then by his sons Cal Alley and James Alley (1916–1968) — came over from the McClure Syndicate
- Highlights of History - J. Carroll Mansfield (1924–1942)
- Honeybunch's Hubby — C. M. Payne (November 27, 1909—March 30, 1911; April 19, 1931–c. 1934) — alternated as a topper strip with S'Matter, Pop?
- Joe and Asbestos (originally called Joe Quince) by Ken Kling (1923–1926; 1931–1970)
- Life's Like That - Fred Neher (1934–1941)
- Looie the Lawyer - Martin Branner (1919)
- Mescal Ike - Art Huhta and S. L. Huntley (December 6, 1926 – August 24, 1940)
- Miss Fury - Tarpé Mills (1941–1952)
- Mutt and Jeff - Bud Fisher and then Al Smith (1916–c. 1944; moved to Field Syndicate)
- The Nebbs - Sol Hess and Wallace Carlson (1923–1947)
- Phil Hardy / Born to Win - "Edwin Alger" (Jay Jerome Williams) and George Storm (1925–1934)
- Reg'lar Fellers (1917–1924) — moved on to George Matthew Adams Service
- Sad Sack - George Baker (1942–1957)
- Sergeant Stony Craig and His US Marines - Frank H. Rentfrow and Don L. Dickson (1937–1946)
- Sherlock Holmes - Leo O'Mealia (1930–1931)
- Sir Bagby by Rick and Bill Hackney (1959-1966)
- S'Matter, Pop? (Nippy's Pop) - C. M. Payne (1911–1940)
- Straight Arrow - John Belfi and Joe Certa (1950-1952)
- Tailspin Tommy - Hal Forrest (1928–1940; moved to United Feature Syndicate)
- That's Different by Walter Berndt (c. 1921)
- Teena A Go Go — writer Bessie Little and artist Bob Powell (August 14, 1966 – February 18, 1967)
- Toonerville Folks by Fontaine Fox (1916–c.1930) — originated with Wheeler Syndicate; later moved to the McNaught Syndicate where it ran until 1955
- True Comics - Ed Smalle and Jack Sparling (early 1940s)
- You Know Me Al - Ring Lardner with art by Will B. Johnstone and Dick Dorgan (1922–1925)
- Uncle Nugent's Funland by Art Nugent (1950–1972; became part of United Feature Syndicate)

== Key people, writers, and columnists ==
Henry M. Snevily was the firm's president. Kathleen Caesar was the Bell Syndicate's editor. Film critic Mordaunt Hall was a Bell copy editor, and he also contributed articles. In 1964, Will Eisner was appointed president of NANA and Bell-McClure, replacing Harry Spiess.

Late in life, after moving over from the Ledger Syndicate, Elizabeth Meriwether Gilmer wrote the Dorothy Dix advice column, which ran in 160 newspapers, until her 1951 death, when Muriel Agnelli took over the column. In 20 newspapers it appeared under the byline "Muriel Nissen," Agnelli's maiden name. Born in Manhattan, Muriel Agnelli attended Hunter College and also studied journalism and psychology at Columbia University. After marrying Joseph P. Agnelli in 1929, she began editing Bell's four-page children's tabloid, The Sunshine Club, and she later wrote a column about postage stamps and stamp collecting. Joseph Agnelli was the Bell Syndicate's executive vice-president and general manager.

The syndicate also distributed James J. Montague's column More Truth than Poetry, as well as many other articles and light fiction pieces, from about 1924 until his death in 1941. The liberal Washington columnist Doris Fleeson wrote a daily Bell political column from 1945 to 1954. Drew Pearson's Washington-Merry-Go-Round column (moving over from United Features Syndicate in 1944) was carried in 600 newspapers until Pearson's death in 1969.

== See also ==
- List of comic strip syndicates
- Comic strip syndication
