= Metropolitan Newspaper Service =

- Industry: Print syndication
- Founded: 1919; 106 years ago
- Founder: Maximilian Elser, Jr.
- Defunct: 1932; 93 years ago
- Fate: merged into United Feature Syndicate
- Headquarters: 220 E. 42nd Street, New York, NY, U.S.
- Key people: Maximilian Elser, Jr. (President); George Carlin (Editorial Staff Chief)
- Products: Columns, Comic strips
- Owner: George Brinton McClellan Harvey (1919–1920); John Neville Wheeler (1920–1930); E. W. Scripps Company (1930–1932)
- Parent: Metropolitan Magazine (1919–1920); Bell Syndicate (1920–1930); United Feature Syndicate (1930–1932)

Metropolitan Newspaper Service (MNS) was a syndication service based in New York City that operated from 1919 to 1932. At first the syndication service of Metropolitan Magazine, it soon became affiliated with the Bell Syndicate, and then was acquired and absorbed into United Feature Syndicate.

A couple of notable, long-running comic strips originated with MNS: Tarzan and Ella Cinders. The service syndicated writers like Margot Asquith, Gertrude Atherton, Joseph Conrad, and Booth Tarkington.

== History ==
Founded in 1919 as a division of Metropolitan Magazine, MNS syndicated material from the magazine, including a column called Fairchild Fashions, the writings of Margot Asquith, a comic strip called Dickey's Dogs, and other pieces. MNS was overseen by Maximilian Elser, Jr., with the title of president. George Carlin was chief of the editorial staff.

In the spring of 1920 MNS was acquired by the Bell Syndicate, which moved MNS headquarters to 220 E. 42nd Street but otherwise kept it as a separate division.

Under Bell, Metropolitan News Syndicate distributed a couple of comic strips written by William Conselman: Good Time Guy and Ella Cinders. The long-running Tarzan comic strip originated with MNS in 1929.

In March 1930, United Feature Syndicate acquired MNS. MNS was re-incorporated under the name Metropolitan Newspaper Feature Service, Inc.; although it was intended for the two services to maintain separate identities, that arrangement only lasted two years until MNS was completely absorbed by United Features.

=== Metropolitan Newspaper Service strips and panels ===
- Dickey's Dogs (also known as Buddie and his Friends and Just Dogs) by Robert L. Dickey (July 14, 1919 – 1932; acquired by United Feature Syndicate where it lasted until July 21, 1940) — after being acquired by UFS, known as Mr. and Mrs. Beans and then Buster Beans
- Ella Cinders originally by William Conselman and Charles Plumb (1925–1930; acquired by United Features where it continued until 1961)
- Good Time Guy (1927–1929) written by "Frank Smiley" (William Conselman) with art by Mel Cummin, then Dick Huemer (1928–1929), and then Fred Fox (1929)
- Tarzan of the Apes by Hal Foster (January 7, 1929–1932; acquired by United Features where it continued until 2001)
