= You Know Me Al =

1916 book by Ring Lardner

You Know Me Al: a busher's letters
- First edition
- Author: Ring Lardner
- Subject: Baseball
- Genre: Epistolary novel, humor
- Published: 1916
- Publisher: George H. Doran
- Media type: Book
- Pages: 218
- ISBN: 9780684136684 (1960 edition)
- OCLC: 288671

You Know Me Al is a book by Ring Lardner, and subsequently a nationally syndicated comic strip scripted by Lardner and drawn by Will B. Johnstone and Dick Dorgan. The book consists of stories that were written as letters from a professional baseball player, Jack Keefe, to his friend Al Blanchard in their hometown of Bedford, Indiana.

== Summary ==
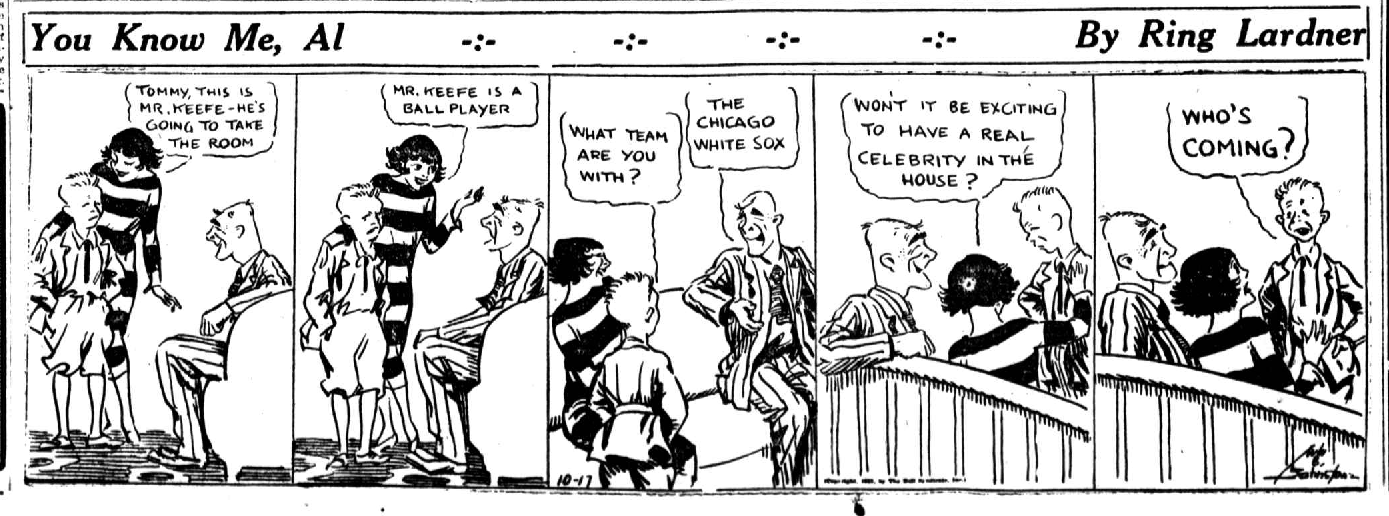
Strip showing the ball player, 1922

Jack Keefe is a headstrong, gullible, cheap, naive, self-centred, egotistical and uneducated rube—but he has a strong pitching arm. He begins the book as a minor leaguer in Terre Haute, Indiana, who gets accepted by the big leagues to pitch for the Chicago White Sox, circa 1913. In his barely literate letters home to his friend Al, he details his first experiences in the big leagues, which ends in disaster as he pitches poorly and gets sent back down to the minors again. Later, he is accepted again by the majors where he gains some success as a pitcher, but is taken advantage of by nearly everyone he meets.

Much of the humour of the book is from Jack's boastful, oblivious nature, and his utter inability to recognize when he is being manipulated or cheated. In one of the book's many examples of this, White Sox owner Charles Comiskey repeatedly dupes Keefe during contract negotiations, but still convinces Keefe he's getting a good deal. Other characters also routinely manipulate Keefe into doing what they want—amongst the major characters, only Al, who is always offstage, seems to be completely aboveboard and loyal to Jack. (Coach Kid Gleason also seems to be honourable to Jack, though he is not above deceiving Jack when it is ultimately for Jack's own good.)

Almost all the baseball characters with whom Jack interacts, be they team owners, managers, or players, were real-life people. Well-known baseball figures who appear in the novel include Comiskey, Gleason (who constantly teases Jack about his weight and lack of baseball smarts), opposing players Christy Mathewson and Ty Cobb, and many of Jack's White Sox teammates. The only major completely fictional baseball character is the left-handed pitcher Allen. Allen is a teammate whom Jack does not especially like. Allen eventually introduces Jack to his sister-in-law Florence ("Florrie").

After brief, semi-disastrous engagements to two other women (Hazel and Violet), Jack eventually marries Florrie. Florence enjoys living in style on Jack's salary in Chicago, and refuses to move back to Bedford during the off season, which causes tension between the two. For a while, to save money, Allen and his wife move in with Jack and Florrie, which makes things even worse. Jack and Florrie separate for a while, but eventually reconcile months later, and soon after have a child named Allen, whom Jack calls Little Al; Florrie assumes the child is named for her brother-in-law, but Jack writes that he is really named after his old friend Al in Bedford. Jack and Florrie's marriage continues to be tense even after Little Al's birth. Jack seems completely unaware that his parentage of Little Al (born eight months after his hastily arranged marriage to Florrie) is potentially ambiguous.

Jack actually does fairly well as a major league pitcher; at one point his record is 10-6. (Typically, Jack assumes full credit for the ten wins, but blames his teammates for the six losses.) However, Jack's gullibility and almost complete self-absorption lead him in and out of a number of scrapes and comical situations throughout the six linked stories in the novel. The book ends with Jack and his teammates about to embark on a trip to Japan for a baseball exhibition.

== Background ==
Lardner was a sportswriter who relocated to Chicago in 1907, where he covered the Cubs and White Sox baseball teams for several city newspapers, most notably the Chicago Tribune. He used his experiences as a baseball writer for his first published piece of fiction, "A Busher's Letters Home", for the Saturday Evening Post in 1914. According to the introduction of the book Ring Around the Bases: the Complete Baseball Stories of Ring Lardner, edited by Matthew J. Bruccoli, the Post published nine of Lardner's baseball stories during 1914, six of which comprised You Know Me Al, published by George H. Doran Company in 1916.

According to Bruccoli, "Despite the magazine exposure of Lardner's magazine stories – the Saturday Evening Post had a weekly circulation of 2,000,000 copies when he wrote for it – he did not reach a large book readership. You Know Me Al required just one printing in 1916 and was not reprinted until 1925 as part of the Scribners program of launching Lardner as a serious writer."

== The "Busher" Stories ==
You Know Me Al is part of a longer sequence of stories about Jack Keefe (a.k.a. "The Busher"). Lardner published a total of 26 "busher" stories, featuring Keefe's fictional letters to Al, between 1914 and 1919 in the Post.

Stories 1 through 6 (all published in 1914) were collected as You Know Me Al. The book takes place over a period of a little over two years, from late 1912 through late 1914.

Stories 7 through 11 (all published in 1915) detail the round-the-world voyage (playing exhibition games) of Jack and his White Sox teammates, and their return home. The stories are set in the off season between 1914 and 1915; in real life, the White Sox and Giants did a round the world tour in 1913–14. These stories have never been reprinted or collected in any form.

After a layoff of three years, Jack Keefe stories began to appear again. Stories 12 through 15 (all published in 1918, but set in 1917) detail Jack's entry into the army due to WWI, and his training while still in America. Story 12 ("Call for Mr. Keefe") sets up some important background elements, including the fact that Jack was drafted into the army against his will—though he would later maintain he volunteered for duty. Despite this, only stories 13 through 15 were collected as Treat 'Em Rough (1918). However, story 12 was included in a 1976 posthumous collection of Lardner’s stories, “Some Champions”. Stories 16 through 21 (published in 1918-19, set in 1918) were collected as The Real Dope (1919), and detailed Corporal Jack Keefe's inglorious misadventures (including eventually being busted down to Private) as a WWI soldier in France.

Lardner used the character in a pitch to buy war bonds that appeared in the Chicago Tribune, October 22, 1917. It was titled ‘Good Tip For Friend Al’. This piece should not be considered within Jack Keefe continuity, as he details why he did not see game action in the 1917 World Series and his plans to buy Liberty bonds with his share of the gate receipts. Conversely, in story 12 ("Call for Mr. Keefe"), Jack enlists in the U.S. Army during the pennant race of 1917, setting in action the series of letters collected in Treat 'Em Rough and The Real Dope, and preventing Jack from the possibility of appearing in the 1917 World Series.

The final set of stories (22–26, all from 1919) detail Jack's return to baseball as a member of the 1919 Chicago White Sox, a team that would gain infamy for throwing the 1919 World Series. Though Jack is not above some (fairly transparent) scheming in attempts to get better pay from White Sox owner Charles Comiskey, he is not part of the series-fixing scheme, which is not mentioned in the stories (which all take place prior to the World Series). In the closing moments of the final story, Jack is traded to the Philadelphia A's before the end of the season, and the stories end before the World Series is played. The final Jack Keefe story, "The Busher Pulls a Mays", was published only nine days after the 1919 World Series concluded.

1. A Busher's Letters Home (7 March 1914)
2. The Busher Comes Back (23 May 1914)
3. The Busher's Honeymoon (11 July 1914)
4. A New Busher Breaks In (12 September 1914)
5. The Busher's Kid (3 October 1914)
6. The Busher Beats It Hence (7 November 1914)
7. The Busher Abroad: Part 1 of 4 (20 March 1915)
8. The Busher Abroad: Part 2 of 4 (10 April 1915)
9. The Busher Abroad: Part 3 of 4 (8 May 1915)
10. The Busher Abroad: Part 4 of 4 (15 May 1915)
11. The Busher's Welcome Home (5 June 1915)
12. Call for Mr. Keefe (9 March 1918)
13. Jack the Kaiser Killer (23 March 1918)
14. Corporal Punishment (13 April 1918)
15. Purls before Swine (8 June 1918)
16. And Many a Stormy Wind Shall Blow (6 July 1918)
17. Private Valentine (3 August 1918)
18. Strategy and Tragedy (31 August 1918)
19. Decorated (26 October 1918)
20. Sammy Boy (21 December 1918)
21. Simple Simon (25 January 1919)
22. The Busher Reenlists (19 April 1919)
23. The Battle of Texas (24 May 1919)
24. Along Came Ruth (26 July 1919)
25. The Courtship of T. Dorgan (6 September 1919)
26. The Busher Pulls a Mays (18 October 1919)

According to Bruccoli, "the Post and its readers wanted all the Busher stories that Lardner could deliver. More than he wanted to write, for he tired of the character and the requirements of the epistolary form ... After he stopped writing about Keefe, Lardner reluctantly provided continuity for a syndicated You Know Me Al comic strip from 1922 to 1925," distributed by the Bell Syndicate, for which Lardner was also working as a writer.

Lardner scripted continuity for over 700 of the syndicated You Know Me Al strips, but, as with his "Busher" stories, he soon grew tired of it, and quit writing continuity in January 1925. According to Richard Layman's introduction to the Harvest collection of strips, Lardner continued to receive credit on the strip until September 1925, "but it is clear he worked ahead very little and after the first of February the ideas are someone else's."
