= Hambone's Meditations =

American comic strip (1916–1968)

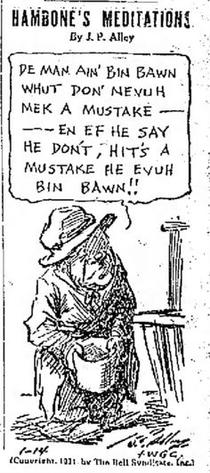
- Hambone's Meditations, by J.P. Alley from 1921
- Author: James Pinckney Alley (1915–1934); Nona Lane Alley (1934–1968)
- Illustrator(s): Cal Alley (1934–1968) & James P. Alley, Jr. (1934–1965)
- Current status/schedule: Concluded gag-a-day strip
- Launch date: 1915
- End date: November 30, 1968
- Alternate name(s): Hambone Says; The Meditations of Hambone
- Syndicate(s): McClure Newspaper Syndicate; Bell Syndicate
- Publisher(s): Jahl & Co.
- Genre: Humor

Hambone's Meditations was a comic strip produced from 1916 to 1968, and syndicated initially by the McClure Newspaper Syndicate and later by the Bell Syndicate. Produced by two generations of the Alley family, the one-panel cartoon originated with the Memphis, Tennessee, newspaper The Commercial Appeal, where it ran on the front page. The title character was a stereotypical African-American man with wide eyes and exaggerated large lips. He dispensed folk wisdom in caricatured dialect.

== Publication history ==
Hambone's Meditations was created by J.P. Alley, the first editorial cartoonist of The Commercial Appeal. The character of Hambone was inspired by Alley's encounter with a philosophical former slave, Tom Hunley of Greenwood, Mississippi. Hunley told a Works Progress Administration interviewer how he met J. P. Alley:

Mr. J.P. really did stay here in Greenwood once. You say you heard dat an' didn't know whether to believe or not? Well, yes ma'am, he was here sho nuff. Dat's been somethin' like 25 year ago. He had an office over de Crumont—does you remember de Crumont? You mus' have been jest a li'l chile when it closed up. Well, upstairs, dat was where Mr. J.P. had his office—leastways his li'l room where he did his drawin' at. Twan't no regular office. I cleant up that place in dem days, an' I come trompin' up de stairs wit my mop an' bucket de fust time Mr. J.P. ever seed me. He cotch one glimpse of me, an' he jump an' holler: "Bless goodness, uncle! You stand right there 'til I can git yo' picture." Den he hole up his fingers like dis and squinch he eye at me, and fus' thing I knowed he had my picture. "Now," he says, "I got to get a name for you." And sho nuff, I'se comin' up de stairs one day a-gnawin' on a big ham-bone what a white lady had guv me. "I got it!" he hollers, "Hambone! From now on yo' name is Hambone!" An' dats what I been ever since, wit my picture in de Commercial Appeal ever' morning. Mr. J.P. he went on back to Memphis, and he dead now, but Young Mister an' his momma what was Mr. J.P.'s lady, dey draws my picture now. Hambone! Yassuh, Mr. J.P. Alley was sho one fine young white man.

The strip and character were popular enough that Hambone's image was used on a variety of products, including sweets and cigars, in the 1920s and 1930s.

When the elder Alley died April 16, 1934, his wife Nona and sons Cal Alley and James P. Alley Jr. took over the strip.

Four Hambone's Meditations strip collections were published, in 1917, 1919, 1934, and 1972.

== Story and characters ==
Hambone's Meditations was inspired by cartoonist Kin Hubbard's Abe Martin of Brown County (syndicated 1904 to 1930), a hillbilly antihero prone to wisecracks jokes and the utterance of popular sayings. The thrust of Hambone's Meditations was essentially similar, transposed onto a Southern rural African-American stereotype. Hambone was depicted as disheveled in appearance, with wide eyes and exaggerated large lips.

The introduction to the 1919 strip collection, published by Jahl & Co., typifies the majority white readership's relationship to Hambone's Meditations:

The Negro of the South lives close to the soil and retains his racial originality—his superstitions, his quaint idiosyncrasies of thought and action. Such a Negro is Hambone, chosen by Mr. J. P. Alley as the original of his delightful cartoons. He is a clearcut type of the old time darky, unspoiled by the equality ideas of the younger generation about him.

== Controversy and cancellation of the strip ==
Historian Michael Honey described the humiliation felt by African Americans due to by Hambone's Meditations:

The grinning simpleton Hambone, through his exaggerated lips, spoke in dialect, saying such things as, 'Ef tomorrow evuh do come, I reck'n Ole Tom gwine be de busies' man in de whole worl'!!!' Judge and civil rights leader Benjamin Hooks related this image to 'total and colossal indifference to negroes and their accomplishments.'

The presence of Hambone on the front page of the Commercial Appeal was noted unfavorably by journalist Garry Wills while covering the aftermath of Martin Luther King's assassination.

Pressure from D'Army Bailey and civil rights groups—including marchers in the Memphis sanitation strike chanting "Hambone just go!"—brought the long-running cartoon series to an end in 1968.

== In popular culture ==
Luther Dickinson released an album in 2012 titled Hambone's Meditations (Songs of the South Records). It was nominated for the 2013 Grammy Award for Best Folk Album.

== See also ==
- Ching Chow
- Portrayal of black people in comics
- Uncle Tom
- Minstrel show
- Jim Crow
