= Metropolitan Magazine (New York City) =

American magazine

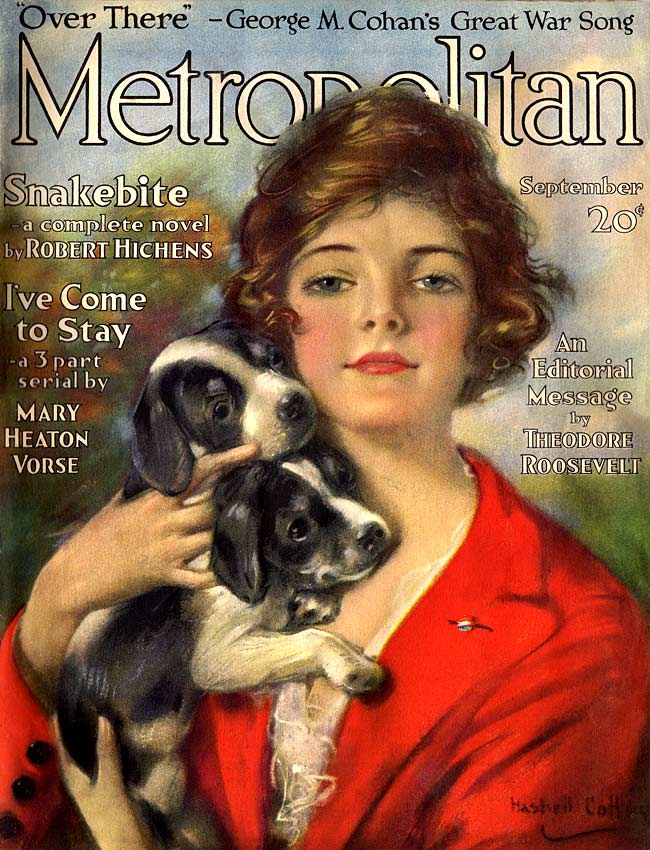
- Cover of the September 1917 issue
- Editor: John Brisben Walker (1895–1902); John Kendrick Bangs (1902–c. 1914); Theodore Roosevelt (1914–c. 1917)
- Categories: Politics, literature, art
- Frequency: Monthly
- Publisher: John Brisben Walker (1895–1902); George Brinton McClellan Harvey (1902–1923); Bernarr Macfadden (1923–1925)
- First issue: 1895
- Final issue: August 1925
- Country: United States
- Based in: New York City, U.S.
- Language: English

Metropolitan was an American magazine, published monthly from 1895 to 1925 in New York City. Former U.S. President Theodore Roosevelt was editor of the magazine during World War I when it focused on politics and literature. It was sometimes named, or called, Metropolitan Magazine or The Metropolitan, and its final issues were published as Macfadden's Fiction-Lover's Magazine.

== Publication history ==
Metropolitan Magazine began in 1895 as a "naughty picture magazine selling sex sationalism" in its earliest issues. In 1897 the Metropolitan featured suggestive photos of Nellie Melba the opera singer and of Yvette Guilbert reclined in her boudoir, which was very risque for the time. John Brisben Walker was its first editor and publisher. In 1898, the magazine built a more sophisticated reputation as a magazine for theater-goers in New York featuring writings by Kipling and Conrad. In 1902, the magazine was sold along with The Daily Telegraph for $100,000 to Col. George Harvey, president of the publishing company Harper & Brothers. Harvey said that "in purchasing The Metropolitan I bought simply a name", and that the chief mission of the periodical should be urban life in New York. He named John Kendrick Bangs the new editor. Harry Payne Whitney was owner of the magazine for a time during the 1910s.

=== The Mexican Revolution and World War I ===
During the Mexican Revolution, initiated late in 1910, Metropolitan sent John Reed to Mexico to report. The journalist met Pancho Villa and stayed with his troops for four months. Reed was sent to Europe as a war correspondent during World War I. However, some of his articles were rejected as having leftist sympathies.

During the 1914 to 1918 war, Metropolitan frequently contained articles critical of United States President Woodrow Wilson. In 1918 the New York postmaster was told to be on his guard for issues commenting on Wilson's foreign policy. There were rumors that the post office was considering revoking the publication's second class mail privileges, but its issues continued to be delivered.

Former President Theodore Roosevelt had become an editor of the magazine in 1914 for $25,000 a year, on a three-year contract because he intended to retire from politics and writing.

In the event, however, Roosevelt himself wrote many essays criticizing Wilson for his handling of the war. He argued passionately against the neutrality of the United States, writing, "We earn as a nation measureless scorn and contempt if we follow the lead of those who exalt peace over righteousness, if we heed the voice of those feeble folk who bleat to high Heaven for peace when there is no peace." Roosevelt worked on editorial articles for Metropolitan until his death in January 1919. His last action was to write a letter to his son Theodore Jr. with the proofs for his last article in the magazine.

In 1919 Metropolitan launched the Metropolitan Newspaper Service (MNS), which a syndicated content from the magazine including the column Fairchild Fashions, the writings of Margot Asquith, the comic strip Dickey's Dogs, and more. In the spring of 1920, MNS was acquired by the Bell Syndicate, which kept it as a separate division. It was overseen by Maximilian Elser Jr.

=== Decline ===
Bernarr Macfadden bought Metropolitan Magazine in January 1923 on the urging of his Supervising Editor Fulton Oursler, and launched its new era with an abridged serialization of Theodore Dreiser's banned novel The Genius. The first Macfadden issue was dated February–March 1923 but it continued as a monthly. Fulton Oursler's first serious novels, Behold This Dreamer! and Sandalwood were also serialized. When the magazine's fortunes didn't improve, the title was changed to Macfadden Fiction-Lovers Magazine with the October 1924 issue. Its last issue was August 1925.

== Selected contributors ==
- Margot Asquith
- Joseph Conrad
- Richard Harding Davis
- Theodore Dreiser
- Larry Evans (novelist)
- Edna Ferber
- F. Scott Fitzgerald
- John Galsworthy
- Katharine Fullerton Gerould
- Maurice Hewlett
- Rupert Hughes
- Rudyard Kipling
- Jack London
- Compton Mackenzie
- John Masefield
- Clarence E. Mulford
- Sir Gilbert Parker
- John Reed
- Theodore Roosevelt
- Booth Tarkington
- Henry Kitchell Webster

== See also ==
- United States non-interventionism (1910s)
