= Art Nugent =

American cartoonist

- Art Nugent in 1960.
- Born: Arthur William Nugent; 1891 Wallingford, Connecticut, U.S.
- Died: March 25, 1975 (aged 83–84) Orange, New Jersey, U.S.
- Area: Cartoonist
- Pseudonym: A. W. Nugent
- Notable works: Uncle Art's Funland
- Spouse: Ann

Arthur William Nugent (/ˈnuːdʒɪnt/; 1891 - March 25, 1975), better known as Art Nugent, was an American cartoonist notable for his long-running syndicated puzzle feature, Funland (aka Uncle Art's Funland), which he drew for four decades. He sometimes used the signature A. W. Nugent.

== Biography ==
=== Early life ===
Born in Wallingford, Connecticut, he began his career as an acrobat. From 1911 to 1918, he was the National AAU Tumbling Champion. In 1916, he made the Olympic team, but the event was canceled.

He joined the U.S. Navy during World War I and began doing artwork while in the service.

Nugent was friends with illusionist Harry Houdini, and the pair would play cards regularly.

=== Puzzlers and Uncle Art's Funland ===
Returning after World War I, Nugent worked as the New York World's puzzle cartoonist for eight years. For the World, Nugent created a feature called Puzzlers in 1927, which was syndicated until c. 1931 by the World's Press Publishing Co.

Puzzlers featured the same games, riddles, connect-the-dots art, crossword puzzles and anagrams that characterized Uncle Art's Funland (alternately known as Uncle Nugent's Funland), launched in 1933. This feature introduced his autobiographical character, Uncle Nugent (aka Uncle Art).

From 1934 to around 1955, Nugent created a variety of single-page puzzle and game features — essentially the same concept as Uncle Art's Funland — for many Golden Age comics:

- Famous Funnies #1–162 (Eastern Color Printing, 1934–1948) — as Funland and occasionally Funland Everybody's Playmate
- Popular Comics #1–35 (Dell Comics, 1936–1938) — as Nugent's Originals or Real Magic
- The Comics (Dell Comics, 1938) — as Comics Puzzles or A Page for Little Artists
- The Funnies #1-27 (Dell Comics, 1936–1938) — as Home Magic or Everybody's Playmate
- All-American Comics #1–24 (All-American Publications, 1939–1941) — as Real Magic to Mystify Your Friends or Nugent's Original Puzzles, Games, Tricks & Comics
- Champ Comics (Harvey Comics, 1940–1943) — as Champ Puzzlers
- Victory Puzzles ran in All-American Comics, Sensation Comics, and Wonder Woman (1943–1944)
- Detective Puzzles ran in All-Flash, All-American Comics, and Detective Comics (1943–1945)
- Sparkling Stars #13–33 (Holyoke Publishing, 1946–1948) — as Puzzle Page
- Felix the Cat (Toby Press, 1953–1955) — as Play Fun or Puzzle Page

Beginning in 1950, Uncle Nugent's Funland was regularly syndicated. Originally with the Bell-McClure Syndicate, it became part of United Feature Syndicate in 1972. Nugent's son Art Nugent, Jr. took over Uncle Art's Funland in the early 1970s with occasional contributions by the elder Nugent until 1974.

Uncle Art's Funland ended in 1991 but was revived circa 2009 by United Media. It is now produced by N.A. Nugent (hypothesized by some to be "Not A Nugent"). and distributed by Andrews McMeel Syndication under the United Features brand.

=== Comic books ===
In the 1940s, Nugent created talking animal stories for Popular Comics and other comic books, including "Pint-Size Pete" for The Big All-American Comics (1944).

From 1945 to 1947, Nugent operated the A.W. Nugent Publishing Company, which only published two titles, both of which featured his signature puzzle pages:

- Cavalier Comics (2 issues, 1945)
- Circus of Fun Comics (3 issues, 1945–1947)

=== Later life ===
Living in Newark, New Jersey, Nugent was a member of the Society of Illustrators.

The senior Nugent was 84 when he died at St. Mary's Hospital in Orange, New Jersey in 1975.

== Art Nugent, Jr. ==
Arthur William Nugent, Jr. (February 6, 1926 - November 23, 1997) studied at Syracuse University and the Newark School of Art. Beginning as his father's assistant, Art Nugent, Jr. was partnering with his father as early as 1953.

The junior Nugent was 71 when he died in 1997.

== Books ==
Funland: Super-packed with Puzzles, Jokes, Amazing Facts and Lots more Exciting Fun!, by Art Nugent and Leo White, is a 132-page paperback collection published by Playmore in 1982.
