= Uncle Art's Funland =

Weekly puzzle and entertainment section

- Author(s): Art Nugent (1933–1974); Art Nugent, Jr. (c. 1971–1991); N. A. Nugent (c. 2009–present)
- Website: www.gocomics.com/uncleartsfunland
- Current status/schedule: Current weekly strip
- Launch date: 1933; 1950; c. 2009
- End date: 1933; 1991
- Alternate name(s): Funland; Uncle Nugent's Funland (1950–1972)
- Syndicate(s): Bell-McClure Syndicate (1950–1972); United Feature Syndicate (1972–1991, c. 2009–present)
- Publisher: Playmore
- Genre: Puzzles
- Preceded by: Puzzlers

Uncle Art's Funland (also known as Funland and as Uncle Nugent's Funland) is a long-running syndicated weekly puzzle and entertainment feature originated by Art Nugent (1891–1975). Featuring jokes, riddles, and paper-and-pencil word games, math challenges, nonograms, connect-the-dots art, crossword puzzles and anagrams, Funland has appeared in newspapers and comic books since 1933, and has been syndicated regularly since 1950.

Nugent credited Uncle Art's Funland's ongoing success "to its being one of the few newspaper features created exclusively for children. 'Some cartoons aren't really meant for children,' Nugent says. 'The language is too complicated and the jokes are too hard for them to understand.' With Uncle Art's Funland, however, toddlers enjoy coloring the pictures, while older children work the puzzles."

== Publication history ==
=== Origins ===
After World War I, Nugent worked as the New York World's puzzle cartoonist for eight years. For the World, Nugent created a feature called Puzzlers in 1927, which was syndicated until c. 1931 by the World's Press Publishing Co. Puzzlers had the same elements that characterized Uncle Art's Funland, launched in 1933, which introduced Nugent's autobiographical character, Uncle Nugent (a.k.a. Uncle Art).

=== In comic books ===
After initially failing to be syndicated in 1933, Nugent took his puzzle page concept to the new medium of comic books. Essentially the same concept as Uncle Art's Funland, the single-page feature was published in many Golden Age comics in the 1930s and 1940s. Funland was published in almost every issue of Eastern Color Printing's Famous Funnies from 1934 to 1948. Other publishers who ran the feature — under a variety of titles — during this period included Dell Comics, All-American Publications, Harvey Comics, DC Comics, Holyoke Publishing, and Toby Press.

=== Syndicated feature ===
Beginning in 1950, Funland was regularly syndicated until after Nugent's death. Originally syndicated by the Bell-McClure Syndicate, it became part of United Feature Syndicate in 1972, lasting there until 1991. In 1975, Funland was being distributed by United Features to more than 100 newspapers.

Nugent's son Art Nugent, Jr. (1926–1997) took over Uncle Art's Funland in the early 1970s with occasional contributions by the elder Nugent until 1974.

Uncle Art's Funland ended in 1991 but was revived in circa 2009 by United Media. It is now distributed by Andrews McMeel Syndication under the United Features brand. Today, the puzzle is produced by N.A. Nugent (hypothesized by some to be "Not A Nugent").

== Comic books ==
Essentially the same concept as Uncle Art's Funland, the single-page feature was published in many Golden Age comics under a variety of titles:

- Famous Funnies #1–162 (Eastern Color Printing, 1934–1948) — as Funland and occasionally Funland Everybody's Playmate
- Popular Comics #1–35 (Dell Comics, 1936–1938) — as Nugent's Originals or Real Magic
- The Comics (Dell Comics, 1938) — as Comics Puzzles or A Page for Little Artists
- The Funnies #1-27 (Dell Comics, 1936–1938) — as Home Magic or Everybody's Playmate
- All-American Comics #1–24 (All-American Publications, 1939–1941) — as Real Magic to Mystify Your Friends or Nugent's Original Puzzles, Games, Tricks & Comics
- Champ Comics (Harvey Comics, 1940–1943) — as Champ Puzzlers
- All-American Comics, Sensation Comics, and Wonder Woman (DC Comics, 1943–1944) — as Victory Puzzles
- All-Flash, All-American Comics, and Detective Comics (DC Comics, 1943–1945) — as Detective Puzzles
- Sparkling Stars #13–33 (Holyoke Publishing, 1946–1948) — as Puzzle Page
- Felix the Cat (Toby Press, 1953–1955) — as Play Fun or Puzzle Page

== Books and collections ==
The Oakland Press published a collection of Funland puzzles (created by Art Nugent, Jr.) in The Oakland Press Funny Book (October 8, 1978).

Funland: Super-Packed with Puzzles, Jokes, Amazing Facts and Lots more Exciting Fun!, by Art Nugent and Leo White, is a 132-page paperback collection published by Playmore in 1982.
