= Charles Plumb (cartoonist) =

American cartoonist

- Charles Plumb with his wife and son Peter in Joplin, Missouri in 1943.
- Born: November 13, 1899 Joplin, Missouri, U.S.
- Died: January 19, 1982 (aged 82)
- Notable works: Ella Cinders

Charles Plumb (November 13, 1899 – January 19, 1982) was an American cartoonist best known for maintaining a high quality of artwork on the comic strip Ella Cinders over three decades. He usually signed his work with the signature Charlie Plumb or Chas. Plumb. He also drew the topper strip Chris Crusty which ran above Ella Cinders from 1931 to 1940.

Born and raised in Joplin, Missouri, Plumb moved at age 15 to Baxter Springs, Kansas, where his father, Carl H. Plumb, was a mining engineer in the Tri-state area of Kansas, Missouri and Oklahoma. After attending Baxter Springs High School, Charlie Plumb studied journalism, art and advertising at the University of Missouri and then worked as an artist and political cartoonist for newspapers in Chicago, Los Angeles and other cities. His parents eventually relocated to Ozark, Missouri.

== Ella Cinders ==
In the early 1920s, while Plumb was employed as an artist at the Los Angeles Times, he met screenwriter William Conselman, and the two created their Ella Cinders strip in 1925 for the Metropolitan Newspaper Service (later United Feature Syndicate). Initially, as the name implies, the strip presented a variation on the classic Cinderella story, but then it diverged into other plotlines, as noted by comics historian Don Markstein:

Ella was the stepdaughter of Myrtle "Ma" Cinders, a formidable woman who assigned Ella to the household drudge work while her own daughters, Prissie ("pinched and acid", to quote Conselman's description of his character) and Lotta ("fat and foolish") Pill spent their copious free time tormenting Ella. But Ella wasn't the sort to let that get her down. With her kid brother Blackie as an ally, she wisecracked her way through the most depressing of situations, finding solace in sarcasm. Outside the house, she had a boyfriend with the improbable name of Waite Lifter. She was pretty enough, in a 1920s sort of way, with straight, black hair and as big and bright a pair of eyes as you'll find anywhere in comics. But she wasn't a raving beauty, and tended to dress down, especially in the early years. Her "fairy godmother" moment did come in the form of winning a beauty contest, but that was only because the guy judging it picked her photo at random. The prize was relocation to Hollywood and a glamorous job at a movie studio. When she got there she found the studio defunct, but at least she was out of the "Cinderella" situation. For the next few years, Ella and Blackie kicked around Hollywood, doing melodramatic continuity in the dailies and one-episode gags on Sundays. She never really prospered, but did okay for herself—in fact, she even got married, though her husband, Patches, spent a lot of time away, having adventures.

== Influences ==
Charles Plumb's Ella Cinders (June 13, 1948)

Artists who influenced Plumb included N. C. Wyeth, H. M. Bateman, Edmund Dulac and Arthur Rackham. In his spare time, Plumb enjoyed fishing. After living in Pasadena, California, he had homes in San Antonio, Texas and Cuernavaca, Mexico, which he called his permanent residence. He also traveled widely, and for some years, the syndicate received his work shipped from an island in the Pacific. Plumb and his wife had four children, Joanne, Barbara (who both lived in San Francisco), Peter (who was born in 1938) and Charles G. Plumb (who was a second-class petty officer in the Navy during World War II).

Plumb employed a number of assistants and ghost artists, including Fred Fox, Joseph Messerli, Jack McGuire, Henry Formhals (who drew Freckles and His Friends) and Hardie Gramatky, ranked by Andrew Wyeth as one of the 20 greatest watercolor painters.

== Final years ==
When Conselman died in the mid-1940s, his estate took over the strip and employed several writers, while Plumb received sole credit on the strip. Fred Fox took over as the strip's artist in the mid-1950s, followed by Roger Armstrong.
