= James J. Montague =

American journalist

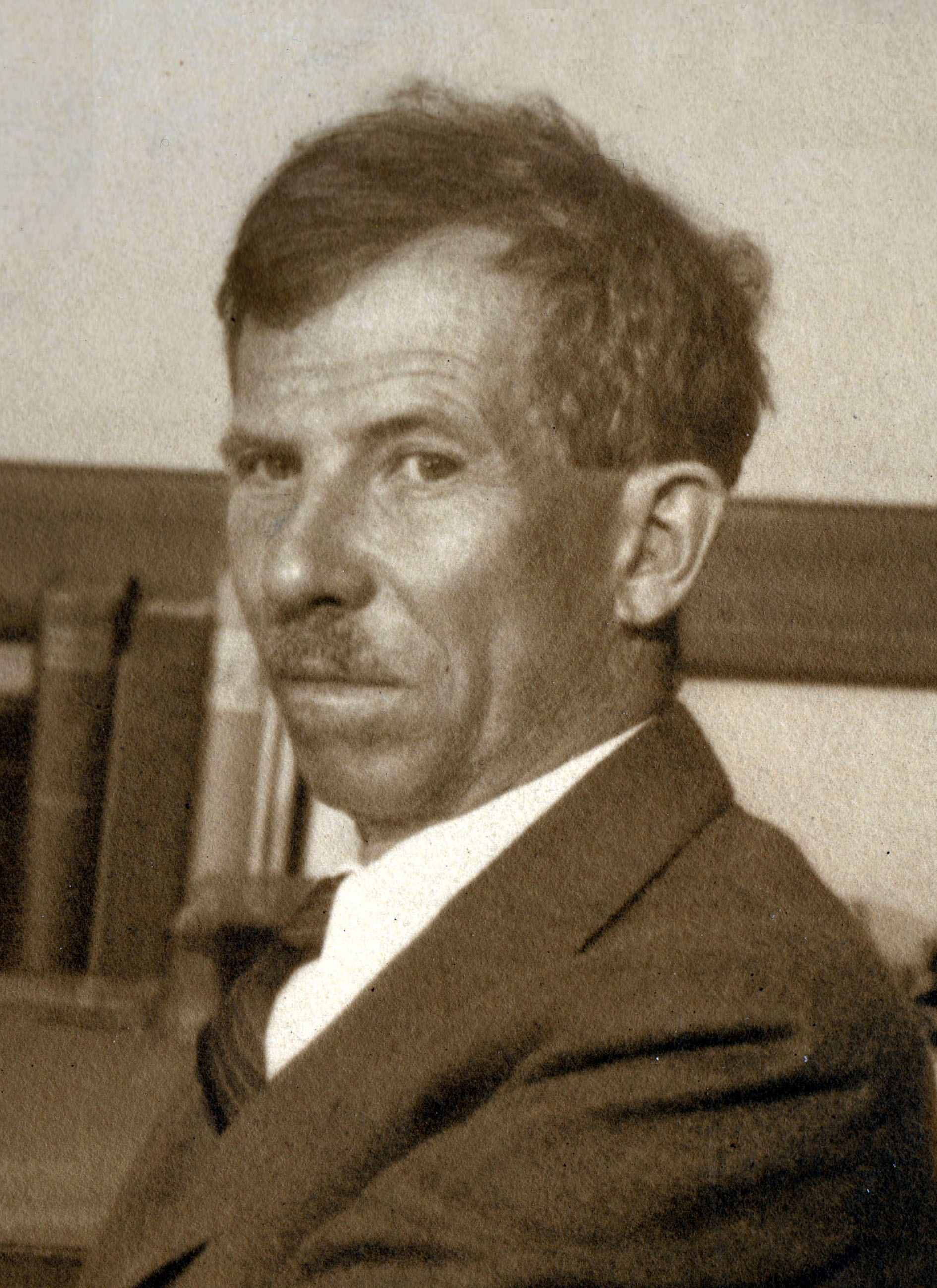
- Born: April 16, 1873; Mason City, Iowa
- Died: December 16, 1941 (aged 68); Belmont, Massachusetts
- Other name: Jimmy Montague
- Occupations: Journalist, satirist, critic, poet
- Notable credit(s): Portland Oregonian, New York American, New York Evening Journal, New York World, New York Herald, New York Herald Tribune, American Journal-Examiner, Cosmopolitan, Life

James Jackson Montague (April 16, 1873 – December 16, 1941) was an American journalist, satirist, and poet. Renowned as a "versifier", Montague is best known for his column "More Truth Than Poetry", which was published in a wide number of newspapers for nearly 25 years.

Montague's journalism career began in 1896 at The Oregonian, where he started as a copy boy. He was soon promoted to reporter and eventually took over the column "Slings and Arrows". In 1902 he was hired by William Randolph Hearst to work at the New York American and New York Evening Journal, where he debuted "More Truth Than Poetry". Montague wrote the column six days a week, in addition to articles on topics such as politics, theater and sports. In 1919 he moved to the New York World, which described him as "the most widely circulated poet in the United States." Later in Montague's career, his whimsical pieces were often carried by the Bell Syndicate.

== Early life ==
James Jackson Montague was born in Mason City, Iowa on April 16, 1873, the sixth child and third son of John Vose Wood Montague and Martha Washington Jackson. The couple lost their first daughter and son in early childhood; four children survived, including James, his brother Richard, and his sisters Carrie and Jane.

In Mason City the father worked as a cashier of the First National Bank until it began to lose money in the recession of 1887. The family then moved to Portland, Oregon, where the father went into the insurance business. James J. Montague entered high school there, finishing in two years so he could go to work to help support the family. Consequently, he never attended university, but he made up for his lack of formal education through a love of literature. In the memoir Memory Street, his son Richard wrote: "He was an omnivorous reader, especially of the works of Shakespeare, Conrad, Mark Twain, O. Henry, Shelley, Keats, Coleridge, Byron [and] Burns"

Montague first worked at lumber mill and later a fish-freezing plant. When he heard there was an opening for an office boy at the Portland Oregonian, he was sufficiently interested in becoming a journalist that he offered to initially work without pay. In 1896, at age 23, he was hired as a "cub" reporter at a salary of $10 a week. Soon after, the writer of an Oregonian column titled "Slings and Arrows" died, and Montague was offered the opportunity to take it over. His version of the column, which often included comic verse, was considered "an immediate success."

In 1898, at age 25, Montague married Helen L. Hageny of Portland, Oregon. Their first child, Richard, was born in 1900. Two years later Montague's writing attracted the attention of publisher William Randolph Hearst through New York Evening Journal cartoonist Homer Davenport, who had worked at the Oregonian before moving to New York in 1895. Through an agent, Hearst offered Montague a position in New York City but he declined, preferring to remain in Portland. Hearst was insistent, however, and the writer named what he thought was a prohibitive price, $60 a week — double his salary at the time — and was "flabbergasted" when it was accepted.

== New York ==
In 1902, Montague, his wife, and son moved to New York, where he began work for Hearst. His daughter Doris, born that year, stayed behind with Montague's mother, who later followed. Initially, the family lived in a Manhattan boardinghouse, then moved to number of rented houses in New Rochelle where their second son, James Lee Montague, was born. They finally built their own house at 204 Drake Avenue, moving in around 1904.

In New York, Montague's work appeared in both the New York American and New York Evening Journal. He produced a poetry column six times a week, in addition to writing a wide range of articles on politics, books, and theater. During his working life, he compiled many binders of his work, of which six from the 1900s survive. Of these, the vast majority are his poetry column.

The New York Times referred to Montague as a "twentieth-century bard," while W.O. McGeehan, then editor of the New York Herald Tribune, said he "took the passing laughter of the day and sent it singing through a typewriter to the presses so that millions could catch its rhythm and understand." To Montague's dislike, his work was occasionally confused with that of Edgar Guest or James Whitcomb Riley, both of whom were also popular during the same period.

While Montague was best known as the writer of "More Truth than Poetry," he also served as an editor at the Hearst papers when required. One of his tasks was completing an "autobiography" of Buffalo Bill Cody, The Great West That Was: "Buffalo Bill's" Life Story, which was serialized in Hearst's International Magazine from August 1916 to July 1917. During the time Montague was working on the manuscript, Cody was a frequent visitor to the writer's New Rochelle home, "usually just in time for lunch or dinner." This friendliness ended when an installment of the autobiography characterized Wild Bill Hickok as a "bandit," something Cody hadn't approved of and didn't appreciate. As Montague's son Richard wrote in his memoir:

"Father claimed that [Cody had] re-armed himself with his old six guns and was stalking our sire with intent to kill. For several weeks after that we kids lived in delicious dread half-believing that father was in deadly danger. When we went out on a walk with him he'd send us on ahead to look around corners and behind trees to see if Bill Cody was waiting in ambush. The fact that he wasn't only made it more likely that he would be there next time. But he never was."

By this time the circulation wars between the Hearst and Pulitzer papers were past their "yellow journalism" zenith of the late 1800s, but the two continued to battle for market share and talent. Montague had originally been recruited by Hearst in 1902, and now The World came calling. On June 15, 1919, the paper announced that Montague would join them, bringing with him his poetry column. In the article, Montague was referred to as the "Aladdin of the Newspaper Poets" and a "successor to James Whitcomb Riley," a characterization he may not have appreciated. While compensation may have played a role in the move, according to his son, more personal factors were also involved:

"[Montague] had had enough of Hearst. In quitting, he said, he felt he had taken a Turkish bath and got clean again. He admired the publisher's brilliance, capricious generosity and many worthy activities, but he didn't like his persistent distortion of the news and lack of principles. 'He could have been a great man,' father told me once. 'The only thing he lacked was character.' "

Hearst never forgave Montague for moving to the World, yet continued to try to persuade him to return. Years later the publisher met him in the street and asked when he would come back. "Never," Montague said. "Yes, you will," Hearst replied. "Hunger will drive you back." The year after Montague left Hearst, a collection of "More Truth than Poetry" columns was published by the George H. Doran Company. The book ran 160 pages with a preface by Irvin S. Cobb, and included classic poems such as "The Sleepytown Express", "The Ouija Board" and "The Vamp Passes."

Later in Montague's career, he joined the Bell Syndicate, working out of the editorial room of the New York Herald Tribune. The syndicate distributed both Montague's poems and light fiction pieces, all under his own copyright. One example is "No Appreciation for This Bard," about an out-of-work press agent, which was published in The Washington Post of January 27, 1924. According to The New York Times, Montague wrote six poetry columns a week for nearly 25 years; at this rate, he produced more than 7,500 examples of "More Truth Than Poetry" over his career.

== Politics ==
In addition to writing "More Truth Than Poetry," Montague was keenly interested in the politics of his day. He covered New York City and New York State events for many years, including the 1913 impeachment trial of Governor William Sulzer and the 1915 libel case between Albany Times-Union owner and publisher William Barnes Jr., and former President Theodore Roosevelt. Because Montague worked for Hearst, who had no liking of Roosevelt, he had to exercise caution when covering the trial. In Eugene Thwing's 1919 book The Life and Meaning of Theodore Roosevelt, the author wrote:

"At the Barnes-Roosevelt libel trial in Syracuse I came across James J. Montague, a hardened reporter on a highly anti-Roosevelt newspaper, walking up and down and cursing. I asked him what moved him to these expletives. 'Roosevelt, damn him,' said Montague; 'I can't keep hating him if I get anywhere within twenty feet of him, and I'm always accidentally doing it. He's spoiling my story.' "

Working for Hearst's publications and wire service, Montague covered the national political conventions of 1912 and 1916. Despite his reputation as a "hardened reporter," Montague had friends in all the political parties of his day — Democratic, Republican, Bull Moose, Socialist and Farmer Labor. "Although Hearst's editorials bitterly denounced most of the principals in these organizations from time to time, the victims never held it against [Montague]."

After World War I, Montague served as an international correspondent for the Hearst publications when required. In 1918 he covered the armistice with Germany and the following year he attended the Paris Peace Conference. In his first cable, dated January 17, 1919, Montague signaled that the authorities appeared ready to exclude all newspaper representatives from the conference. "America has come here seeking nothing but an open agreement," Montague wrote. "If she is to persuaded to play the European game of secret and underground bickering she is certain to lose not only her initial advantage but all her objectives."

Other, less serious events at the conference also contributed to the legend of his having been the "star" of the press corps:

"[After the conference] a group of American correspondents, including Mr. Montague, shared a luxurious dinner, featured by a tremendous turkey. About to leave for England, Mr. Montague remarked that since it might be a long time before they had another such meal it might be worth while taking the remains of the turkey along. But when they arrived they were rushed to Buckingham Palace and the man with the turkey in the shoebox still had it under his arm. Over the protests of an equerry, he — Montague — is alleged to have still carried the box when presented to His Majesty George V.

Having jumped to Pulitzer's New York World in 1919, the following year Montague covered the U.S. presidential election for them. "A big convention without 'Jimmy' Montague at the press table would seem scarcely legal," the World magazine wrote in 1919. Montague also covered the 1924 conventions and election, which was notable for the split within the Democratic Party. In it, front-runners William Gibbs McAdoo and Al Smith fought a war of attrition until, 103 ballots later, John W. Davis was selected as the compromise candidate. Filing daily under the byline "the Looker-On," Montague chronicled the battle with stories such as "16 Candidates Trying to Pick Least Unpopular: Like So Many Jack Horners, They Dig Their Thumbs Into Convention Pie Containing One Plum."

While Montague was never interested in personally entering politics, he occasionally provided assistance to friends in their campaigns. He had known Franklin Delano Roosevelt since he was a New York state senator in 1910, and in those days "often helped the young legislator with his speeches and with political advice." He provided similar assistance to Al Smith at various times during his campaigns for New York State governor. In 1932 he traveled with William J. Donovan as an "adviser and campaign critic" when he was running for governor of New York.

== Personal life ==
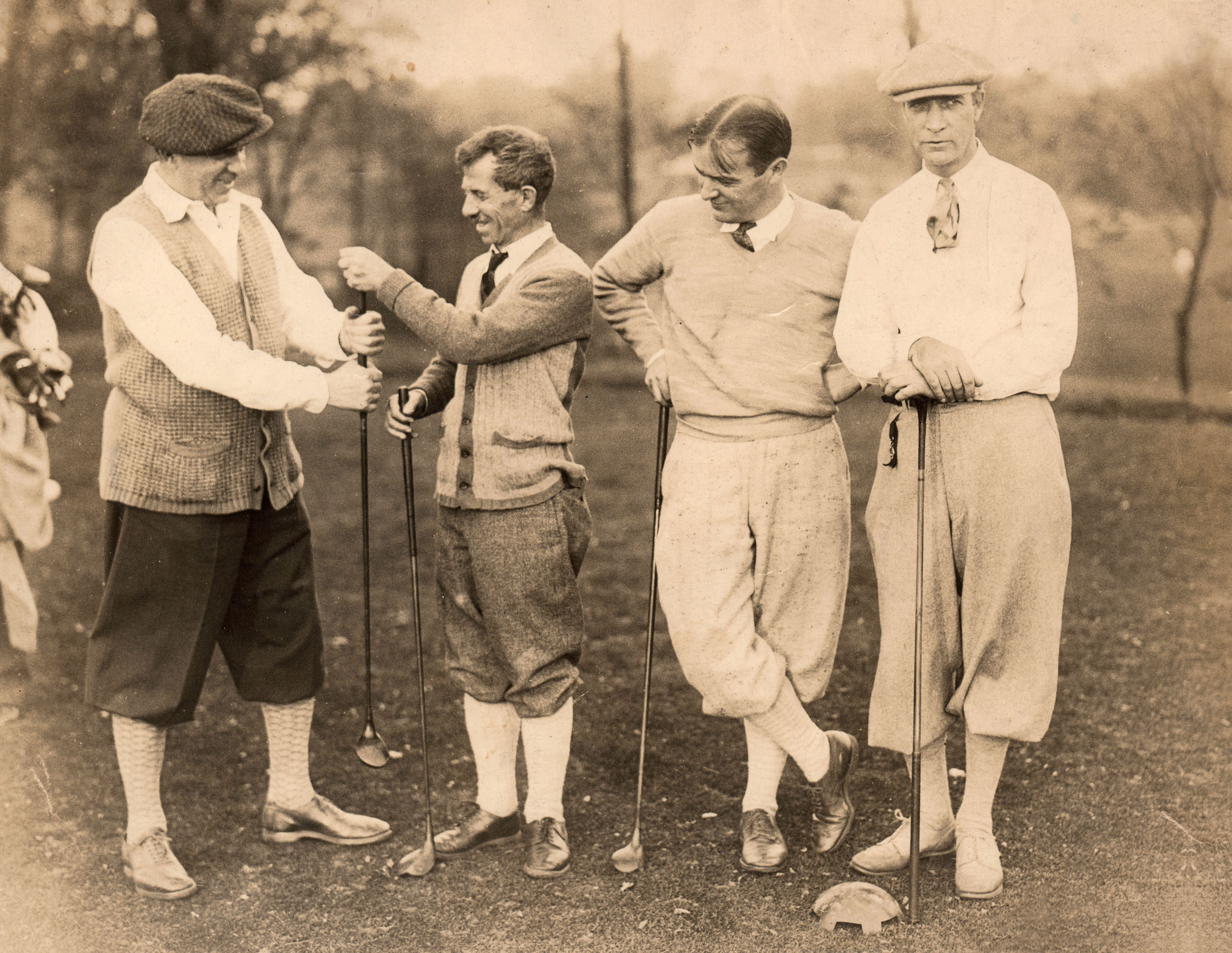
Members of the Knot-Very Social and Musical Frat prepare to play golf in the 1910s. Among them is James J. Montague, second from left, and Ring Lardner, on the right.

Montague came to golf relatively late in life but showed a talent for the game. A member of the New York Athletic Club, he initially played on public links on Pelham Bay Park. According to his friend and fellow journalist Grantland Rice, Montague was eventually so good that he could "shoot par with hoes, rakes, and shovels."

Together with Montague, New York theater impresario John Golden organized the "Knot-Very Social and Musical Frat." The organization had only four other members: Newspaperman and publisher John Neville Wheeler, sports journalist and writer Ring Lardner, American Magazine editor John Sidall, and Grantland Rice. For the members, none of whom had attended college, the organization was miniature fraternity, as much social as athletic. According to Rice's biographer William Arthur Harper, "The club got its name from Ring Lardner's habit of commenting on another's tee shot; when one of them would hit a drive, another would say cheerfully, 'Nice shot, old boy.' 'Not very,' Ring Lardner would respond, drolly." The club's letterhead, designed by Golden, featured a knotted rope above the names of its members, the largest being that of its president, Montague.

In 1924 artist Lucius Wolcott Hitchcock introduced Montague to illustrator Coles Phillips, also a resident of New Rochelle. A noted pigeon fancier, Phillips suggested to Montague that they could make a substantial amount of money raising and selling squabs to restaurants and hotels. The breed chosen was the red carneau. Together they bought four acres of land on Webster Avenue near the Wykagyl Country Club, built a row of pigeon houses and installed 4,000 birds. The result, called the Silver Ring Squab Farm, had set the two back a total of $15,000.

Their dreams of pigeon-born wealth went anything but smoothly, however: A local mobster reputedly demanded a portion of the proceeds, while hotels had a habit of canceling orders. Friends were interested, but more in eating squab than paying for them. Not long after, Phillips contracted tuberculosis, and he and his wife left for Europe. Now sole manager of the farm, Montague put in thousands more to keep it afloat. Salvation came in the form of Westchester County, which wanted to buy the land to construct the Hutchinson River Parkway. Phillips later returned from Europe seemingly healthy, but died in 1927 at age 47.

== Death ==
While Montague once seemed tireless, his health began to fail in the 1930s. His last daily poem appeared in the New York Herald Tribune on May 16, 1936. "When he retired, the newspaper used free-lance verse rather than attempt to find a permanent successor", wrote The New York Times. His wife, Helen, died in January 1937 after nearly 40 years of marriage. As his health worsened, Montague went to the McLean Hospital in Belmont, Massachusetts. He died there on December 16, 1941, survived by his two sons and daughter as well as seven grandchildren.

== Bibliography ==
- More Truth than Poetry, George H. Doran Company, 1920, 160 pages.

== See also ==
- "The Purloined Cod" – a Montague poem on an event in the news
