= North American Newspaper Alliance =

- Formerly: Bell Syndicate-North American Newspaper Alliance
- Type: Print syndication
- Industry: Media
- Founded: 1922; 104 years ago
- Defunct: 1980; 46 years ago
- Successor: United Feature Syndicate
- Headquarters: U.S.
- Area served: United States, Canada
- Key people: John Neville Wheeler, John M. Pratt, Grantland Rice, Joseph Alsop, Michael Stern, Lothrop Stoddard, Dorothy Thompson, George Schuyler, Pauline Frederick, Sheilah Graham Westbrook, Edna Ferber, F. Scott Fitzgerald, Sinclair Lewis, Ernest Hemingway, Edith Ronne, Ira Wolfert, Ian Fleming, Lucianne Goldberg
- Products: Distribution of news articles, columns, and other features to newspapers
- Owner: John Neville Wheeler (1930–1951); Ernest Cuneo (1951–1963)
- Divisions: Bell Syndicate

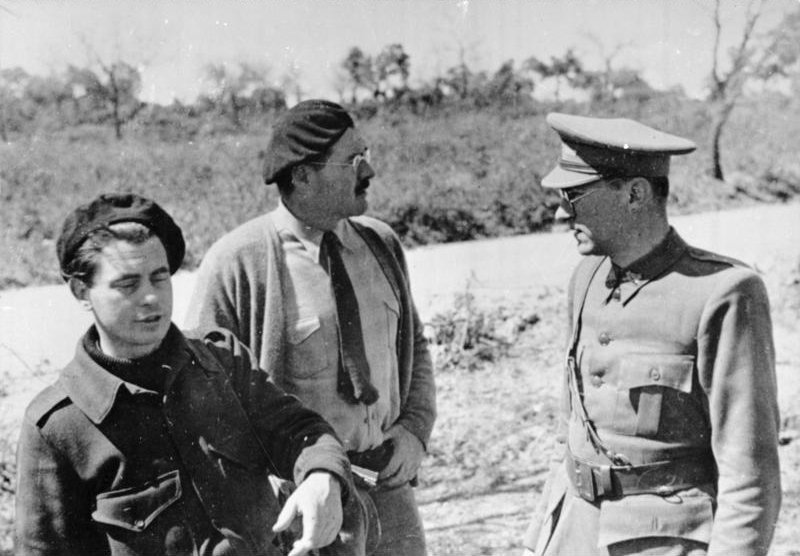
Ernest Hemingway (centre) while reporting on the Spanish Civil War for the North American Newspaper Alliance in 1937.

The North American Newspaper Alliance (NANA) was a large newspaper syndicate in operation between 1922 and 1980. NANA employed writers such as Grantland Rice, Joseph Alsop, Michael Stern, Lothrop Stoddard, Dorothy Thompson, George Schuyler, Pauline Frederick, Sheilah Graham Westbrook, Edna Ferber, F. Scott Fitzgerald, and Ernest Hemingway (who covered the Spanish Civil War for NANA).

== History ==
=== Foundation ===
NANA was founded in 1922 by 50 major newspapers in the United States and Canada led by Harry Chandler of the Los Angeles Times and Loring Pickering of the San Francisco Chronicle.

=== Wheeler era ===
Publishing executive John Neville Wheeler became general manager of NANA in 1930, which soon absorbed the Bell Syndicate, a similar organization Wheeler had founded around 1916, although both continued to operate individually under joint ownership. NANA continued to acquire other syndicates over time, including Associated Newspapers and the Consolidated Press Association (at that point headed by David Lawrence).

In the 1930s and 1940s, NANA was known for its selections for the College Football All-America Team, using four well-known coaches each year. One of NANA's most famous correspondents was Ernest Hemingway, who was sent to Spain in 1937 to report on the Spanish Civil War. Hemingway based one of his best-known novels, For Whom the Bell Tolls, published in 1940, on his experiences there.

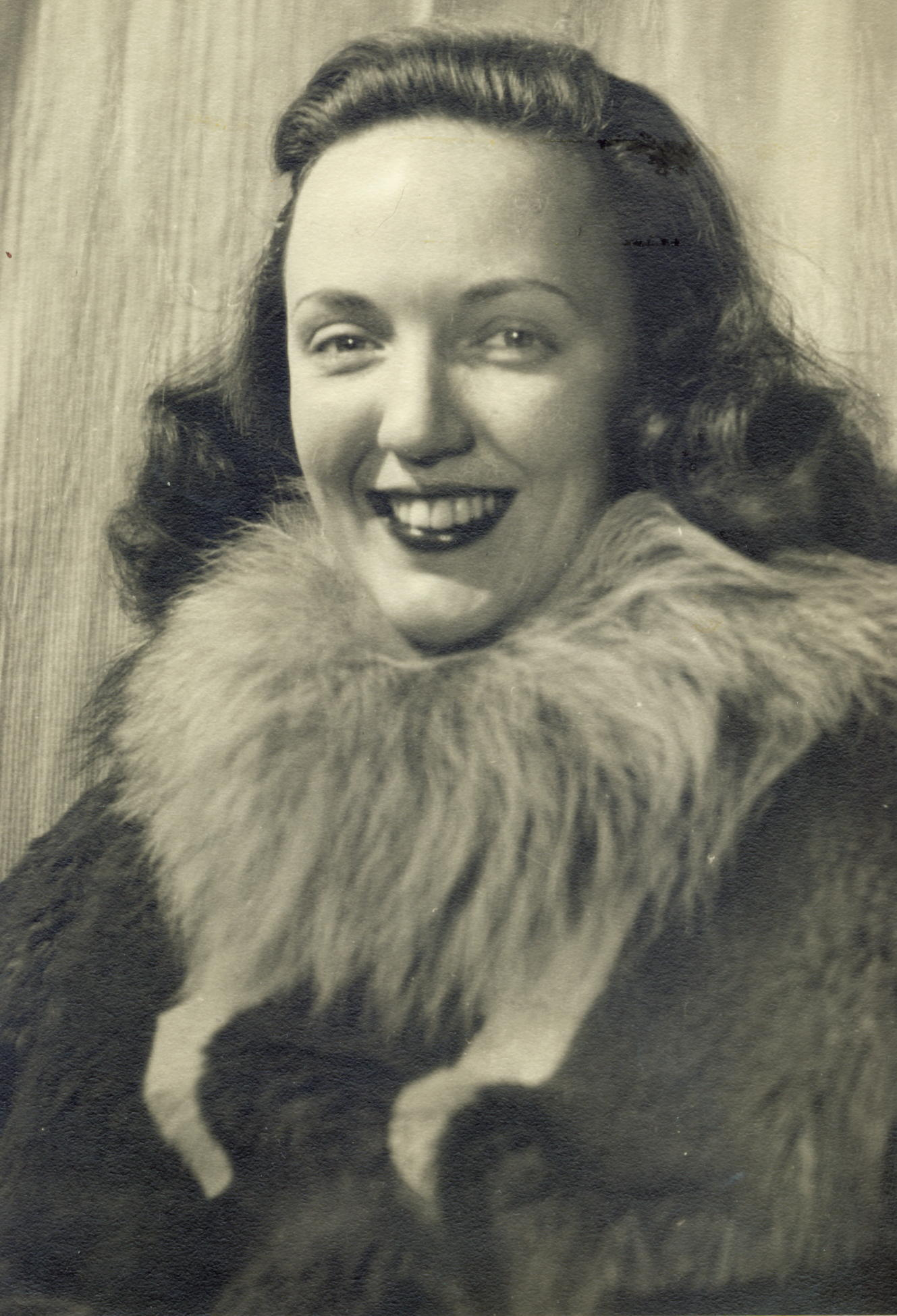
Edith Ronne was a correspondent for the NANA syndicate during the Ronne Antarctic Research Expedition (1947-1948).

In 1943, Ira Wolfert won an international Pulitzer Prize for Telegraphic Reporting for his field reports for NANA during the Battle of the Eastern Solomons. Among NANA's other notable stories from this period were those about the Ronne Antarctic Research Expedition, which in 1947 and 1948 researched the area surrounding the head of the Weddell Sea in Antarctica. Edith Ronne, wife of the expedition leader, was a correspondent for the syndicate, posting dispatches from Antarctica for the duration of the expedition. She named a landform there, Cape Wheeler, in honor of her editor, John Neville Wheeler.

=== Cuneo era ===
By the early 1950s the syndicate was being overshadowed by more powerful news syndicates, and in March 1951 it was purchased by a small group of investors led by Ernest Cuneo, formerly associated with British Security Coordination and the OSS, and Ivar Bryce. They gave the job of European Vice President to the writer Ian Fleming, who was also their mutual friend.

Ernest Cuneo and the Bell Syndicate-North American Newspaper Alliance group acquired the McClure Newspaper Syndicate in September 1952, with Louis Ruppel installed as president and editor.

Cuneo acquired full control over NANA in the mid-1950s and served as president until 1963 when he sold it. However, he remained with NANA as a columnist and military analyst from 1963 to 1980.

Because of Cuneo's association with former members of American and British intelligence, including Fleming and Bryce, and because some writers in the Cuneo era had alleged links to the CIA, critics have suggested that NANA under his tenure was a front for espionage.

=== Later years ===
A notable event late in the syndicate’s history occurred when a freelance correspondent, Lucianne Goldberg joined the press corps covering candidate George McGovern during the 1972 presidential campaign, claiming to be a reporter for the Women's News Service, an affiliate of NANA. In reality, she was being paid $1,000 a week by Richard Nixon operative Murray Chotiner for regular reports about happenings on the campaign trail. She said "They were looking for really dirty stuff. . . Who was sleeping with who, what the Secret Service men were doing with the stewardesses, who was smoking pot on the plane — that sort of thing."

NANA and Bell McClure were acquired by United Feature Syndicate in 1972. The news service discontinued operations in 1980.
