= Mel Cummin =

American cartoonist

- Portrait photo of Mel Cummin from the files of The Explorers Club.
- Born: Melville Porter Cummin; January 29, 1895 Brooklyn, New York
- Died: December 1, 1980 (aged 85) Fort Montgomery, New York
- Areas: cartoonist, naturalist
- Notable works: Good Time Guy, McCall's Magazine paper-dolls
- Awards: The Edward C. Sweeney Medal (1978)

Melville Porter Cummin (January 29, 1895 – December 1, 1980), popularly known as Mel Cummin, was a magazine illustrator and a newspaper staff artist; a notable cartoonist in the early decades of American comic strips; and a Golden Age comic book artist and art director. He was active in the Society of Friends. Cummin was also a well-known naturalist and explorer.

== Biography ==
=== Early years ===
Mel Cummin was born in Brooklyn, New York, on January 29, 1895. Of Quaker origin, Cummin attended Friends Seminary (his mother, wife and both daughters were all educated there). On course at a young age for his eventual career, Melville Cummin is listed in Mary Mapes Dodge's St. Nicholas Magazine in 1909 as president of a seven-member chapter of the St. Nicholas League called "St. Nick Drawing Club". He attended National Preparatory Academy and the Art Students League of New York. He held no college degrees. He was a teetotaler. Cummin married at around age twenty. He became a father at age twenty-one in 1916.

=== Graphic artist ===
Cummin worked as a graphic artist for many decades. At various times he was a staff artist for publications of the Boy Scouts of America (c. 1912, shortly after the organization's founding) and West Point.

He served as art director for the American Kennel Club "Gazette". The editors of the "Gazette" paid tribute to Cummin in 2005 by revisiting his work, and called him "the master draftsman whose cartoons were such a distinctive part of the GAZETTE during the 1940s and '50s." In fact, Cummin drew for that publication at least as early as 1937.

Cummin drew editorial cartoons for The Middletown News-Signal, an Ohio daily. He worked as an illustrator for the San Francisco Examiner as well as a number of New York newspapers, and also contributed to magazines, including the original Life.

When the renowned Winsor McCay left the employ of the New York Sunday American in 1924, the great newspaper journalist Arthur Brisbane hired Cummin to fill the vacancy, because of a similarity of style. Brisbane told Cummin however that the job would be McCay's again if he desired to reclaim it. McCay did so in 1927. After McCay's death in 1934 Brisbane rehired Cummin (Brisbane died December 25, 1936). Therefore, Cummin originated and drew many of the big, eight-column cartoons for Brisbane's editorials in the New York Sunday American, the New York Evening Journal and occasionally The Mirror from 1924 to 1927, and again in 1934 and 1935. Cummin called Brisbane "a well-informed naturalist," and said the two collaborators discussed the subject of Naturalism frequently.

Mel Cummin's paper doll pages for McCall's in 1922.

One of the endeavors that brought Cummin popular notice was his recurring paper dolls/cut-outs section for McCall's Magazine beginning in the early 1920s. Examples of his subjects include Teeny Town, Martha and George Washington, Dappelton Farm's Wagon House and Hay Barn, Strike Out for the Camp-Fire Trail! (shown), The Madisons and Their Family Carriage and John Adams and Abigail, His Wife. Our American Humorists (1922 ed.) lists Cummin among many others including Winsor McCay as "Our Comic Artists," and (in a probable reference to this work for McCall's) credits him with "Children's Cartoons."

=== Early comic strips ===
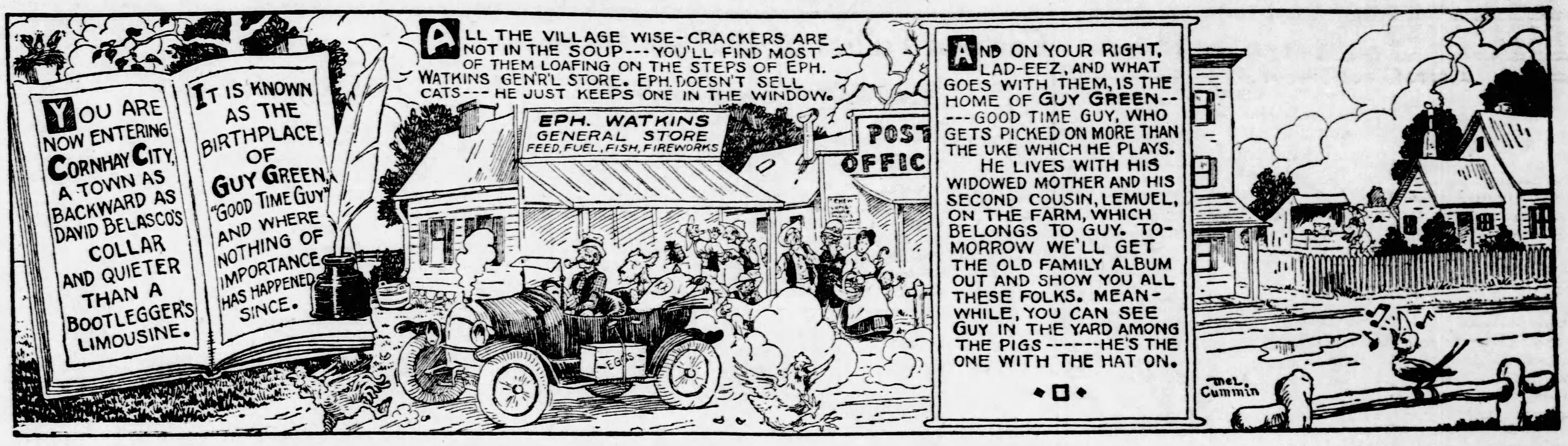
Debut strip of Cummin's Good Time Guy (1927)

Later in the decade, Cummin was the first artist for Good Time Guy, which began in 1927. During the strip's short run at Metropolitan Newspaper Service, Cummin worked with writer Bill Conselman, a notable screenwriter who was writing under the pen name "Frank Smiley". Cummin was succeeded the following year by Dick Huemer.

Around the same time, Cummin began developing a comic strip called Hap Hazzard (alternatively titled Hap McSnap), which may not have ever seen publication. Hap Hazzard featured an art deco-influenced style (the originals surfaced in the 1990s comic art market), with dialog full of puns and complicated wordplay, suggesting it too may have been written by Conselman. Cummin made another foray into comics in 1929 with Traveler in the Land of Trundletree, a daily strip that may have been nationally syndicated, or only local.

=== Back to nature ===
Cummin was a well-known artist-naturalist, who produced work for museums (including backgrounds and drawings for exhibits) and their publications, and was a benefactor and Life Member of the American Museum of Natural History. His deep personal interest in nature is further evidenced by his very active "Life Fellow" membership in New York's Explorers Club, which he joined in 1937. He was elected the club's third vice president in 1954, and he also served as secretary. Over the years, Cummin joined expeditions to Haiti, Santo Domingo, and the Canadian Arctic (on the latter expedition he carried the Explorers Flag). He collected specimens, took photographs, and painted and drew what he encountered in nature. In 1978 he was awarded the Edward C. Sweeney Medal for service to the Explorers Club. Cummin rounded out his credentials with memberships in the American Society of Ichthyologists and Herpetologists, New York Zoological Society, and National Geographic Society.

His willingness to take a public stand in favor of science and the theory of evolution is demonstrated by his involvement with a publication called Evolution: A Journal of Nature. The magazine was published between 1927 and 1938. Its twelfth and final issue notes the addition to the group of Contributing Editors of "Melville P. Cummin, Artist and Naturalist, associated with the American Kennel Gazette."

Mel Cummin's Back to Nature feature.

In the late 1930s, Cummin decided to marry his comic strip experience to his passion for naturalism in creating Back to Nature, for which he was granted a copyright on May 10, 1937. This educational syndicated daily newspaper feature spotlighted flora and fauna facts with the subjects rendered in a naturalistic art style. In promoting the feature Cummin wrote, "We pride ourselves on our culture, on our mastery of the principles of modern science; and, like peacocks, we like to display the social graces. Yet, many would trade places gladly with our forefathers who lived so close to nature. Our so-called civilization is merely a thin veneer covering a framework of rough wood that has been thousands of years in the making."

=== Golden age ===
Mel Cummin drew covers, interiors, and he also served as art director from 1946 to 1949 for Novelty Press, one of the numerous comic book publishers of the Golden Age of the 1940s (his tenure as art director there is alternately listed as 1943–1948 on the Who's Who of American Comic Books 1928-1999 website). The cover to Target Comics #V7 #1, for example, was produced from Cummin's pencil and ink artwork.

=== Later years ===
Cummin's home studio, which he designed and built himself, was set in four acres of the beautiful wilderness of the Hudson Highlands, in Fort Montgomery, New York. In 1977, he listed his present occupation on a questionnaire as "trying to convince myself that I'm retired," and his avocations as "model-making, dioramas, and designing wooden toys for children."

Melville Porter Cummin died the first day of December 1980, survived by his wife of 65 years, Marion (Van Buskirk) Cummin, and two daughters, Eleanor Claire and Miriam Louise.

Cartoonist Herb Roth, assistant and successor to H. T. Webster, was an intimate friend for decades. Roth wrote of Mel Cummin in 1937, "Knowing him as I do, I believe the newspaper that contains his work is fortunate; and far more fortunate are its readers. He is an exceptional man."

== Notes ==
Mel Cummin art from Hap Hazzard, c. 1929. This work, left unfinished, reveals his method.
