= Abe Martin (comic strip) =

American newspaper comic strip

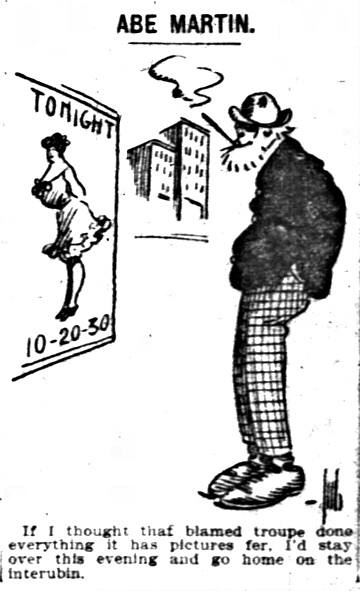
- First recognized Abe Martin cartoon
- Author: Kin Hubbard
- Current status/schedule: Concluded gag-a-day strip
- Launch date: December 17, 1904
- End date: 1937
- Syndicate(s): John F. Dille Co. (c. 1916–1937)
- Publisher: The Indianapolis News
- Genre: Humor comics

Abe Martin was an American newspaper gag-a-day comic strip, drawn by Kin Hubbard and published from 1904 until 1937 in The Indianapolis News and other newspapers.

== Character ==
Abe Martin was an anti-hero character, making wisecracker jokes and uttering sayings which became popular over the country. He made his first appearance on December 17, 1904. Originally the character's locality wasn't specified, but in a strip from February 3, 1905, he announced: "I'm goin' ter move ter Brown County Tewmorrow", which he did. At the time the character's popularity was such that by 1910 over 200 newspapers carried the strip and special almanacs were made. Notable fans were George Ade, Will Rogers, and James Whitcomb Riley. In an interview with Dick Cavett, S. J. Perelman said Groucho Marx read and quoted Hubbard's writing.

== Early version ==
The Indianapolis News published a cartoon by Hubbard on September 15, 1904, featuring another character named Abe Martin.

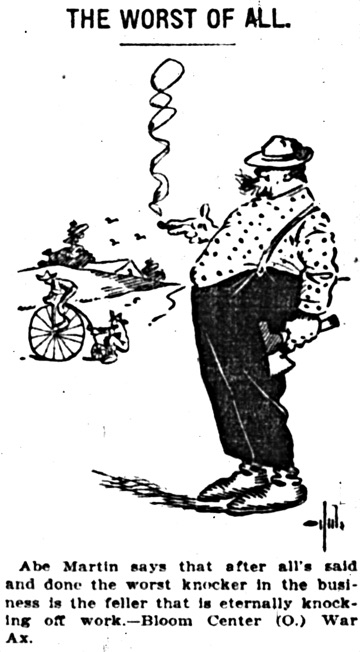
An earlier character by Hubbard named Abe Martin, September 15, 1904

== Other one-panel cartoons of the era ==
- Ching Chow
- Hambone's Meditations
