= Ella Cinders =

American comic strip

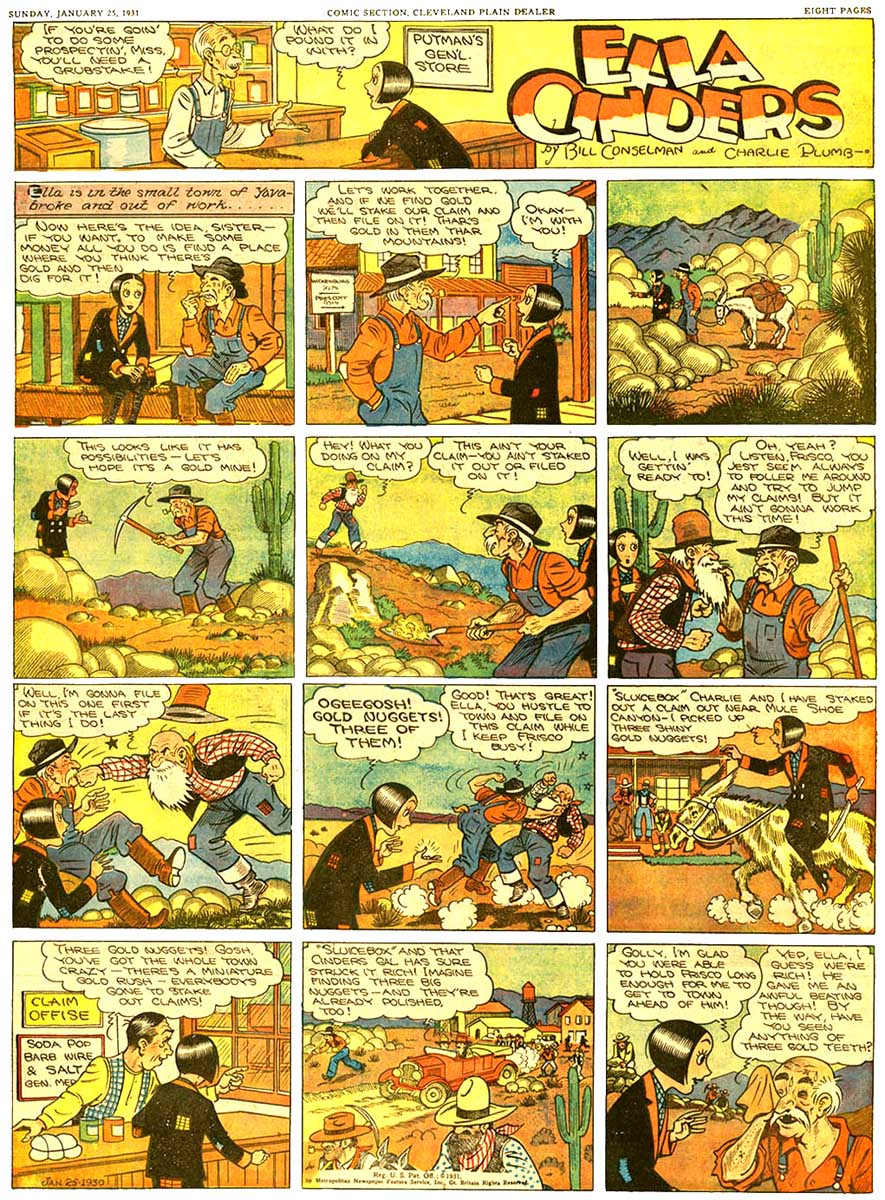
- Bill Conselman and Charles Plumb's Ella Cinders (January 25, 1931). Road signs for Prescott and Wickenburg indicate the setting is in Yavapai County, Arizona. Note the date discrepancy in bottom panels.
- Author: William Conselman
- Illustrator: Charles Plumb
- Current status/schedule: Concluded daily & Sunday strip
- Launch date: June 1, 1925; 101 years ago
- End date: December 2, 1961; 64 years ago
- Syndicate(s): Metropolitan Newspaper Service (1925–1930); United Feature Syndicate (1930–1961)
- Genre: Humor

Ella Cinders is an American syndicated comic strip created by writer Bill Conselman and artist Charles Plumb. Distributed for most of its run by United Feature Syndicate, the daily version was launched June 1, 1925, and a Sunday page followed two years later. It was discontinued on December 2, 1961. Chris Crusty ran above Ella Cinders as a topper strip from July 5, 1931 to July 6, 1941.

== Publication history ==
Ella Cinders was launched in 1925 by the Metropolitan Newspaper Service (MNS). In the summer of 1925, Max Elser, Jr., the president of MNS, introduced Ella Cinders and Conselman to the readers of Cartoons & Movies magazine:

Ella Cinders derives her name from and is based on Cinderella. The Cinderella motif is generally accepted in fiction, in the movies and in the legitimate drama as the most popular of all themes. This new strip of the Metropolitan was planned last summer by its originator, Conselman, formerly of the editorial staff of the Los Angeles Times. The drawing is the work of Charlie Plumb, who was formerly on the Los Angeles Times. The introductory strips were drawn last year.

United Features acquired MNS in 1930, taking over syndication of Ella Cinders.

The credited artists on the strip were creator Charles Plumb (June 1, 1925 - May 13, 1950), Fred Fox (May 15, 1950 - 1960) and Roger Armstrong of Scamp (1960 - December 2, 1961).

However, the comic strip had numerous ghost writers and ghost artists. Comic strip historian Allan Holtz notes, "Very seldom did the credited writer or artist perform the task claimed - though they were usually involved in some capacity." The ghosts included children's book author Hardie Gramatky, Morton Traylor, Henry Formhals (of Freckles and His Friends) and Texas artist Jack W. McGuire. His son, Jack W. McGuire, Jr., recalled:

His first strip was Jane Arden in 1934, followed by Bullet Benton, a cowboy boxer similar to Joe Palooka; then the Red Knight. After the Red Knight in 1943, Dad began drawing Ella Cinders as a ghost artist for the original artist, Charles Plumb. He drew this strip until he died in December 1945.

== Characters and story ==
Initially, as the name implies, the strip presented a variation on the classic Cinderella story, but then it diverged into other plotlines, as noted by comics historian Don Markstein:

Ella is the Cinderella of the comic. She has the standard 1920s charm look with classic straight black hair cut in a bob and large round eyes common in comics. She dressed in simpler clothing, more prominently in the earlier years of the comic, and was not the rare beauty common in other stories.

Ella's step family is made of Myrtle "Ma" Cinders, her stepmother, and her stepsisters Prissie and Lotta Pill. Prissie has been described by Conselman as "pinched and acid" and Lotta as "fat and foolish." Both sisters use their free time to torment Ella while she is assigned household work by Myrtle "Ma" Cinders. To endure the treatment from her step family Ella joins with her allies her brother, Blackie, and her boyfriend, Waite Lifter, to wisecrack and find happiness in sarcasm.

As the story progresses Ella receives her "fairy godmother" moment from a beauty contest where she wins by a judge randomly selecting her photo. As a prize for winning the beauty contest Ella receives a job at a movie theater and she and her brother move to Hollywood. Once there Ella learns that the studio is now defunct. She and Blackie decide to stay in Hollywood anyway and continue with melodramatics in the daily comics and one-episode gags in the Sunday comics. Ella continued this life of fun but never prospered. She eventually married, though her husband Patches spent a large amount of time away having adventure.

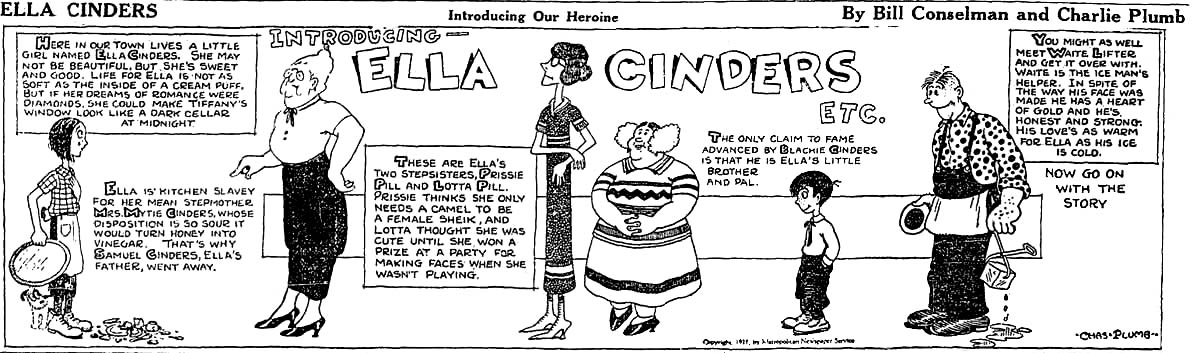
The characters are introduced in the first Ella Cinders strip (June 1, 1925)

== Film adaptation ==
The prolific Alfred E. Green directed the film adaptation Ella Cinders, starring Colleen Moore, produced by Moore's husband John McCormick, and released by First National Pictures on June 6, 1926.

== Books ==
Ella also turned up in Big Little Books and comic books, including early issues of Tip Top and Sparkler Comics, plus her own title in 1948–1949.
