= William Conselman =

American screenwriter (1896–1940)

William Marien Conselman
- Born: July 10, 1896; New York City, U.S.
- Died: May 25, 1940 (aged 43); Eagle Rock, California, U.S.
- Occupations: Screenwriter; Comic writer
- Years active: 1921–1940

William Marien Conselman (July 10, 1896 – May 25, 1940) was an American screenwriter who also wrote newspaper comic strips under his Bill Conselman byline and sometimes under the pseudonym Frank Smiley.

== Biography ==
Bill Conselman and Charlie Plumb's Ella Cinders (January 26, 1930). To see this image at a readable resolution, go to The Myriad Worlds of Chris Roberson.

Born in Brooklyn, New York, Conselman arrived on the West Coast in 1920 and joined the staff of the Los Angeles Times as the assistant city editor. His play And Then What, staged by the San Diego Players, opened November 6, 1923 at Balboa Park's Yorick Theater.

Between 1921 and 1940, he was a screenwriter on more than 50 films. By 1936, he had an annual income of more than $60,000. In Hollywood, he often collaborated with writer Jack Woodford. Conselman was also a lyricist, and in 1928, he directed the film Four A.M.

== Comic strips ==
With artist Charles Plumb, Conselman created the syndicated comic strip Ella Cinders in 1925. Using his Frank Smiley pseudonym, he wrote the less successful Good Time Guy with Mel Cummin. The latter was drawn by animation pioneer Dick Huemer, who later spent four decades as a key talent at the Disney Company.

In the summer of 1925, Max Elser Jr., the president of New York's Metropolitan Newspaper Service, introduced Ella Cinders and Conselman to the readers of Cartoons & Movies magazine:

Ella Cinders derives her name from and is based on Cinderella. The Cinderella motif is generally accepted in fiction, in the movies and in the legitimate drama as the most popular of all themes. This new strip of the Metropolitan was planned last summer by its originator, Conselman, formerly of the editorial staff of the Los Angeles Times. The drawing is the work of Charlie Plumb, who was formerly on the Los Angeles Times. The introductory strips were drawn last year.

Bill Conselman married Wilhelmina Rambo (who was known as Mina), and the couple lived in Eagle Rock, California at 4905 Lockhaven Street. In May 1941, their daughter Deirdre married famed tennis pro Don Budge.

Conselman was 43 when he died of a liver ailment at his home after a three-month illness.

== Selected filmography ==
- Why Trust Your Husband? (1921)
- Why Get Married? (1924)
- La Bohème (1926)
- Slaves of Beauty (1927)
- Pajamas (1927)
- News Parade (1928)
- Whoopee! (1930)
- Six Cylinder Love (1931)
- Heartbreak (1931)
- Business and Pleasure (1932)
- Young Sinners (1932)
- Stepping Sisters (1932)
- Young America (1932)
- Frontier Marshal (1934)
- Bright Eyes (1934)
- Orient Express (1934)
- The Little Colonel (1935)
- Pigskin Parade (1936)
- Private Number (1936)
- Stowaway (1936)
- On the Avenue (1937)
- That I May Live (1937)
- Fifty Roads to Town (1937)
- The Great Hospital Mystery (1937)
- Keep Smiling (1938)
- That's Right – You're Wrong (1939)
- So This Is London (1939)
- East Side of Heaven (1939)
- Yesterday's Heroes (1940)
- If I Had My Way (1940)
