= J.P. Alley =

American cartoonist

J.P. Alley (1885–1934) was an editorial cartoonist whose work attacking the Ku Klux Klan brought his employer, the Memphis Commercial Appeal newspaper, the 1923 Pulitzer Prize for Public Service. He was best known for his Hambone's Meditations, a syndicated comic strip featuring a racist, Jim Crow caricature of an African American man.

== Life and career ==
Born James Pinckney Alley near Benton, Arkansas, in 1885, he worked as a pottery maker after his graduation from public school in 1903. Subsequently, he lived in Little Rock and Greenwood, Mississippi, while developing into a commercial artist. Employed by a Little Rock engraving company in 1908, Alley got married and freelanced as a cartoonist. In 1909, he and his family moved to Memphis, where he was employed by the Bluff City Engraving Co. The business was located in the same building as the Commercial Appeal, which proved fortuitous.

Although he took a correspondence course, Alley's craft as a commercial artist and cartoonist was largely self-taught. He freelanced for the newspaper before being hired in 1916, becoming its first editorial cartoonist.

Many of his political cartoons employed humor and satire. E. H. Crump, the Boss of Memphis, was a frequent target. The anti-Klan cartoons of 1923 were instrumental in helping defeat Klan-backed politicians in that year's municipal races.

=== Hambone's Meditations ===
Alley's editorial cartoons were central to the Commercial Appeal's attack on the Klan that resulted in its Pulitzer Prize. His Hambone cartoons, though popular among Southern whites, were seen as racist and despised by African-Americans.

The character of Hambone debuted in 1916 in one of his editorial cartoons. It developed into its own comic strip, Hambone's Meditations, which eventually began appearing on the front page of the Commercial Appeal. The presence of Hambone on the newspaper's front page was noted unfavorably by journalist Garry Wills while covering the Martin Luther King assassination.

The character of Hambone became so popular, Alley syndicated it as a comic strip. He published collections of his Hambone cartoons, the first in 1919. Hambone's Meditations was cancelled after Martin Luther King's assassination, having been made an object of derision by the striking Memphis sanitation workers who Dr. King had come to help.

== Death and legacy ==
J. P. Alley died on April 16, 1934, after a lengthy illness at the age of 49. His son Calvin "Cal" Alley succeeded him as the Commercial Appeal's editorial cartoonist.

His wife Nona Alley, who wrote dialogue for the Hambone cartoons, along with Calvin and her son James Alley, kept the comic strip going for another 34 years. It finally was discontinued in the wake of the assassination of Martin Luther King Jr. in Memphis in 1968.

Both J.P. Alley and Cal Alley are members of the Tennessee Newspaper Hall of Fame. Cal was inducted in 1979 while his father became a member in 1993.
