= George H. Doran Company =

American publishing company

- Founded: February 22, 1908
- Founder: George H. Doran
- Country of origin: United States
- Headquarters location: New York City
- Publication types: Books

George H. Doran Company is an American book publishing company established by George Henry Doran. He organized the company in Toronto and moved it to New York City on February 22, 1908.

The firm prospered, becoming one of the major publishing houses in the United States. The firm published in many genres, from major literary works to "working-class" novels, how to play golf books, religious books, romances, children and juvenile adventure fiction, and poetry. It was the American publisher of many British authors and as part of the World War I war effort, the company was the major source for Allied literature, publishing such things as the British Government's British War Aims, Statement by the Right Honourable David Lloyd George as well as Lloyd George's book, The Great Crusade. Doran published a number of other books on the war including two by James W. Gerard, the American Ambassador to Germany.

Among the notable authors published by the George H. Doran Company were Joyce Kilmer, P. G. Wodehouse, Arnold Bennett, Arnold J. Toynbee, Theodore Roosevelt, Arthur Conan Doyle, O. Henry, Frank L. Packard, James J. Montague, Edwin Lefèvre, Virginia Woolf, Frank Harris, H. G. Wells, W. Somerset Maugham, Sinclair Lewis, H. L. Mencken, John Dos Passos and Margery Williams.

Book series published by the George H. Doran Company included the First Novel Library, Hutchinson’s Library of Standard Lives, the Murray Hill Library and Pocket Books.

George H. Doran Company merged with Doubleday, Page & Company in 1927, making Doubleday, Doran the largest publishing business in the English-speaking world. The Doran name disappeared in 1946 when the company became known simply as Doubleday & Company.

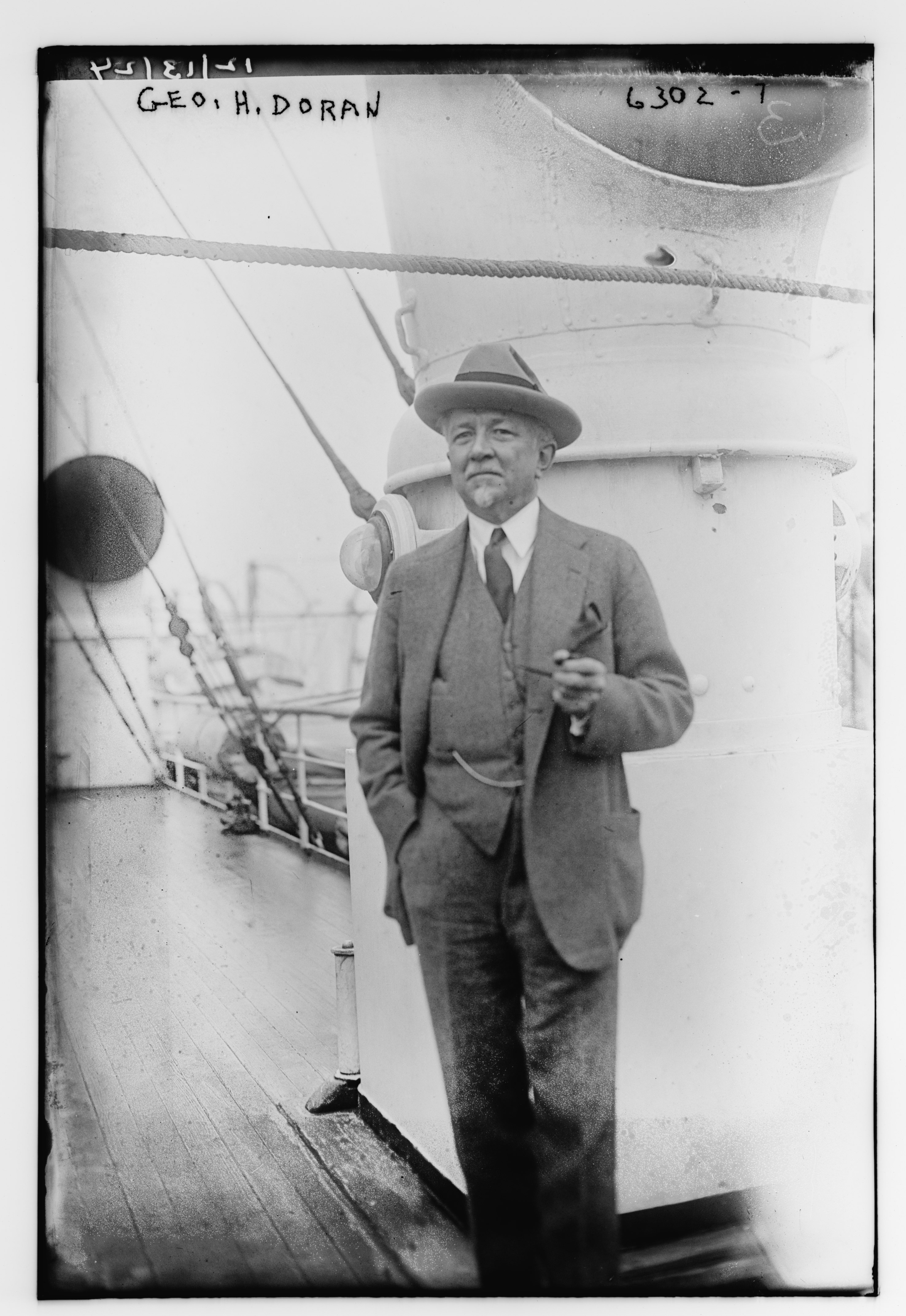
George H. Doran in 1924

George H. Doran was born in Toronto, Ontario, Canada in 1869. He moved frequently from New York City to London, England during his publishing career, and was well acquainted with most of the writers he published.

In 1935, George Doran wrote Chronicles of Barabbas 1884–1934, that told about the publishing business and its personalities. It was republished in 1952 with Further Chronicles and Comment added to the title.
