= Cal Alley =

American cartoonist

- Born: October 10, 1915 Memphis, Tennessee
- Died: November 10, 1970 (aged 55)
- Area: Cartoonist
- Notable works: The Commercial Appeal editorial cartoonist (1945–1970); Hambone's Meditations (1934–1968); The Ryatts
- Awards: Sigma Delta Chi Distinguished Service Award, 1955

Calvin Lane Alley (October 10, 1915 – November 10, 1970) was the editorial cartoonist for The Commercial Appeal in Memphis, Tennessee, from 1945 until 1970.

== Hambone's Meditations ==
Born in Memphis, Cal Alley was the son of James Pinckney Alley, creator of the syndicated cartoon panel Hambone's Meditations, and the first editorial cartoonist at The Commercial Appeal in 1916. Hambone's Meditations ran on the front page of The Commercial Appeal. When the elder Alley died April 16, 1934, his wife Nona, Cal Alley, and his brother James took over Hambone's Meditations.

== Editorial cartoons and The Ryatts ==
In 1939, Alley began his cartoon career in Missouri where he was an editorial cartoonist with the Kansas City Journal. When the Journal folded in 1942, he moved on to the Nashville Banner.

Three years later, he signed on with The Commercial Appeal, where he launched a comic strip, The Ryatts, syndicated by the Post-Hall Syndicate from 1954 to 1994. Comics historian Don Markstein noted:

Besides Mom and Dad Ryatt, there were five kids: Missy, Kitty, Pam, Tad and Winky. If there was one family member who could be singled out as the star, it was Winky, the youngest. In fact, for a while during the late 1960s and early 1970s, the strip had the alternate title Winky Ryatt. Like many working in the domestic comedy genre, Alley drew inspiration from his own family. Alley retired in 1965, and died in 1970. The Ryatts was taken over by Jack Elrod, who later also took over Mark Trail from creator Ed Dodd. The (North America) syndicate folded the strip in 1994.

Alley's sister, Elizabeth Alley, was married to Frank Ahlgren, editor of The Commercial Appeal from 1936 to 1968.

== Awards ==
Alley received the Sigma Delta Chi Distinguished Service Award for a 1955 editorial cartoon. He was inducted into the Tennessee Hall of Fame which "honors those who have made an outstanding contribution to Tennessee Newspaper journalism or, through Tennessee journalism, to newspaper journalism generally, or who have made an extraordinary contribution to their communities and region, or the state, through newspaper journalism."

Alley retired in 1965 and died of cancer five years later at the age of 55.
