= John Neville Wheeler =

- Photo of Wheeler from Elmo Scott Watson's A History of Newspaper Syndicates in the United States, 1865-1935, published in 1936.
- Born: April 11, 1886; Yonkers, New York
- Died: October 13, 1973 (aged 87); Ridgefield, Connecticut
- Education: Columbia University
- Occupations: Newspaperman, Publishing executive, Magazine editor, Author
- Employer(s): New York Herald; Liberty
- Known for: Wheeler Syndicate; Bell Syndicate; North American Newspaper Alliance
- Notable work: I've Got News for You (1961)

John Neville Wheeler (April 11, 1886 – October 13, 1973) was an American newspaperman, publishing executive, magazine editor, and writer. He was born in Yonkers, New York, graduated Columbia University (which holds a collection of his papers), was a veteran of World War I serving in France as a field artillery lieutenant, began his newspaper career at the New York Herald, and became managing editor of Liberty. He was married to Elizabeth T. Wheeler and had one daughter, the film editor Elizabeth Wheeler, who died in 1956. He is known primarily as the founder of several newspaper syndicates, of which the largest was the North American Newspaper Alliance (NANA), and through which he employed some of the most noted writing talents of his day.

== Syndicates ==
In 1913, while still a sportswriter for the Herald, Wheeler formed the Wheeler Syndicate to specialize in distribution of sports features to newspapers in the United States and Canada. That same year his Wheeler Syndicate contracted with pioneering comic strip artist Bud Fisher and cartoonist Fontaine Fox to begin distributing their work. Fisher is reported to have received an annual guarantee of $52,000, an unprecedented amount at that time. Journalist Richard Harding Davis was sent to Belgium as war correspondent and reported on early battlefield actions, as the Wheeler Syndicate became a comprehensive news collection and distribution operation. In 1916, it was purchased by the McClure Syndicate, the oldest and largest U.S. news and feature syndicate.

Immediately upon the sale of the Wheeler Syndicate to McClure, Wheeler founded another, the Bell Syndicate which soon attracted Ring Lardner, and was joined by cartoonists Fisher and Fox. James J. Montague also contributed his column "More Truth than Poetry" and other articles. In early 1924, Wheeler became executive editor of the new weekly magazine Liberty, and served in that capacity until early 1926 while continuing to run the Bell Syndicate.

In 1930, he became general manager of the North American Newspaper Alliance, established in 1922 by 50 major newspapers in the United States and Canada which absorbed Bell, both continuing to operate individually under joint ownership. NANA continued to acquire other syndicates, including the McClure Syndicate.

In 1947, Cape Wheeler in Antarctica was named after him. Wheeler's autobiography, I've Got News for You, was published in 1961.

By the time he sold NANA in 1966 to the publishing and media company, Koster-Dana, he had employed many of the most influential writers of his time, including Grantland Rice, Joseph Alsop, Dorothy Thompson, Pauline Frederick, Sheilah Graham and F. Scott Fitzgerald. It was Wheeler who hired Ernest Hemingway to cover the Spanish Civil War, who inscribed for him a copy of For Whom the Bell Tolls, "To Jack Wheeler, who gave me the chance to go to war."

When he died on October 13, 1973, in Ridgefield, Connecticut, at the age of 87, his obituary in the Ridgefield Press described him as one who "never quit newspapering, permanently, until his death."
