= George Brinton McClellan Harvey =

American journalist (1864–1928)

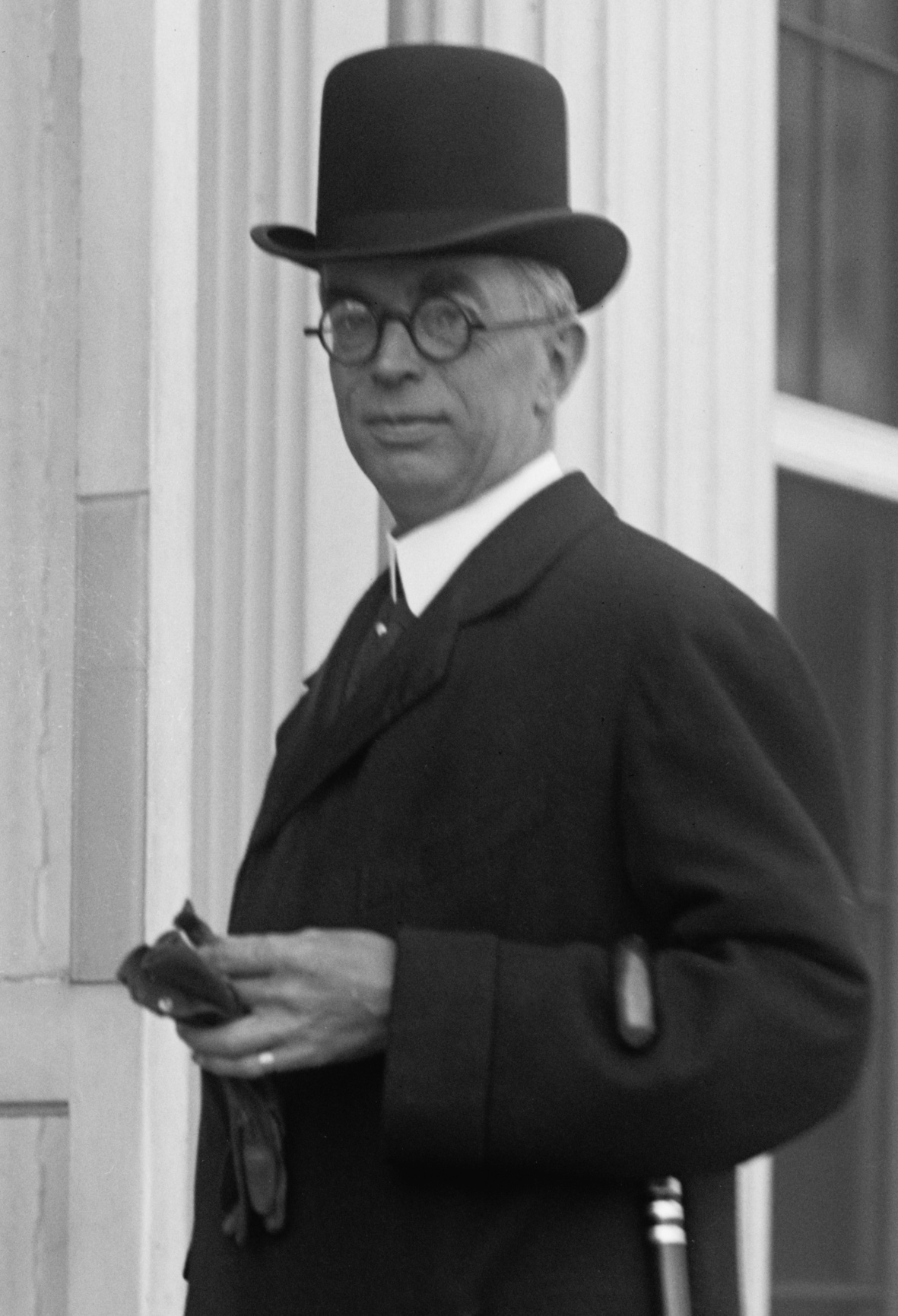
- Harvey in 1914

United States Ambassador to the United Kingdom
- In office May 12, 1921 – November 3, 1923
- President: Warren G. Harding
- Preceded by: John W. Davis
- Succeeded by: Frank B. Kellogg

Personal details
- Born: February 16, 1864 Peacham, Vermont, US
- Died: August 20, 1928 (aged 64) Dublin, New Hampshire, US

George Brinton McClellan Harvey (February 16, 1864 – August 20, 1928) was an American diplomat, journalist, author, street railway magnate, and editor of several magazines. He used his great wealth in politics. He was an early promoter of Woodrow Wilson, but they became bitter enemies. Harvey was a conservative who wanted Washington to protect big business from what he saw as unjust privilege by labor unions. He repudiated Wilson when he saw Wilson oppose political machines and threaten big business in the style of progressive era reformers.

Harvey then supported conservative Republican causes, such as opposition to the League of Nations.

== Biography ==
Born in Peacham, Vermont, he was educated at Peacham Academy. At the age of 18, he became a reporter on the Springfield (Massachusetts) Republican and later on the New York World, where he reported on New Jersey politics. He was appointed by Governor Robert Stockton Green of New Jersey as aide-de-camp on his staff, and was reappointed by Governor Leon Abbett. The latter also made him insurance commissioner of New Jersey in 1890. A protégé of publisher Joseph Pulitzer, at the age of twenty-seven he became managing editor of the New York World (1891–4). It was the flagship newspaper of the Democratic Party; its editorials were widely reprinted by the party press.

Harvey then became associated with Thomas Fortune Ryan and William C. Whitney, leading Democrats who were millionaire promoters of street railways. In 1898 Harvey organized a syndicate which acquired the lines in Havana, Cuba. Having accumulated a great fortune, he purchased prestige magazines, including the North American Review in 1899. It had long been the leading national magazine in arts, letters, and politics, but it was soon overshadowed and outsold by muckraking magazines of which Harvey disapproved. In 1901 he also purchased Harper's Weekly, which he edited until 1913. He was president of Harper and Company until 1915. In 1903, Harvey purchased the Metropolitan Magazine.

=== Politics ===
A conservative Democrat, Harvey was a top advisor to New Jersey governor Woodrow Wilson. As early as 1906 he became the first leader to suggest Wilson, then president of Princeton University, would be a strong presidential possibility. According to Arthur Link, "More than any other single individual, he was responsible for Wilson's political career." In the run-up to the start of the 1912 campaign he gave Wilson strong support. But Wilson was moving left and needed to shake off the image that he was under the thumb of Wall Street. Wilson sensed he was jeopardized by Harvey's officiousness and conservatism, while Harvey was alarmed by Wilson's move to the left of the party. Their breakup was the talk of the hour in the national press, and helped Wilson gain support among liberal Democrats.

In 1916 Harvey urged the election of Charles E. Hughes, the Republican candidate for president.

Despite retiring from Harper's Weekly as editor in 1913, Harvey returned in 1918 to use it as a medium for attacking the policies of President Wilson. In 1918 he established The North American Review's War Weekly, later called Harvey's Weekly, which bitterly denounced Wilson's foreign policy.

Harvey was a central figure in the "smoke-filled room" that played a major role in the GOP national convention in Chicago in 1920. The politicians there recognized that the three leading contenders were stalemated and that a dark horse like Warren G. Harding was needed as the Republican nominee. Harvey himself favored Will H. Hays, another dark horse but one with less support. When Harding was elected, he appointed Harvey to the highly prestigious post of Ambassador to the Court of St. James's (perhaps better known as Ambassador to Great Britain). Harvey served from 1921 until 1923 but was not comfortable in the role. He gained a reputation for being acid-tongued and was quoted in 1923 as saying that "the national American foreign policy is to have no foreign policy."

From 1906 until 1908, Harvey promoted the constructed language Esperanto in the North American Review. In 1908 and 1909 he was president of Esperanto-Asocio de Norda Ameriko (Esperanto Association of North America). He was a strong proponent of women's suffrage, speaking often upon the subject until the US Constitution was amended to require it in 1920. He was strongly opposed to the League of Nations in 1919 and 1920 on the ground that it involved the yielding of national sovereignty.

Harvey published a number of works during his life, most notably Women in 1908 and Henry Clay Frick, the Man (1928), a biography of the industrialist, art collector, and philanthropist. He died on August 20, 1928, at his home in Dublin, New Hampshire. Harvey was buried in Peacham Village Cemetery.

== Publications ==
- Harvey, George (1904). Address at the 175th Anniversary Dinner of the St. Andrew's Society of Charleston, South Carolina.
- Harvey, George (1908). Women, Etc.: Some Leaves from an Editor's Diary (1908). New York: Harper & Brothers.
- Harvey, George (1911). The Power of Tolerance and Other Speeches. New York: Harper & Brothers.
- Harvey, George (1920). Opinions.
- Harvey, George (1928). Henry Clay Frick: The Man., an authorized biography by a close friend online Archived 2019-07-05 at the Wayback Machine

== See also ==
- List of covers of Time magazine (1920s) - 25 October 1926

== Notes ==
Diplomatic posts
Preceded by John W. Davis	United States Ambassador to the United Kingdom; 1921–1923	Succeeded by Frank B. Kellogg
