= Good Time Guy =

American comic strip by Frank Smiley

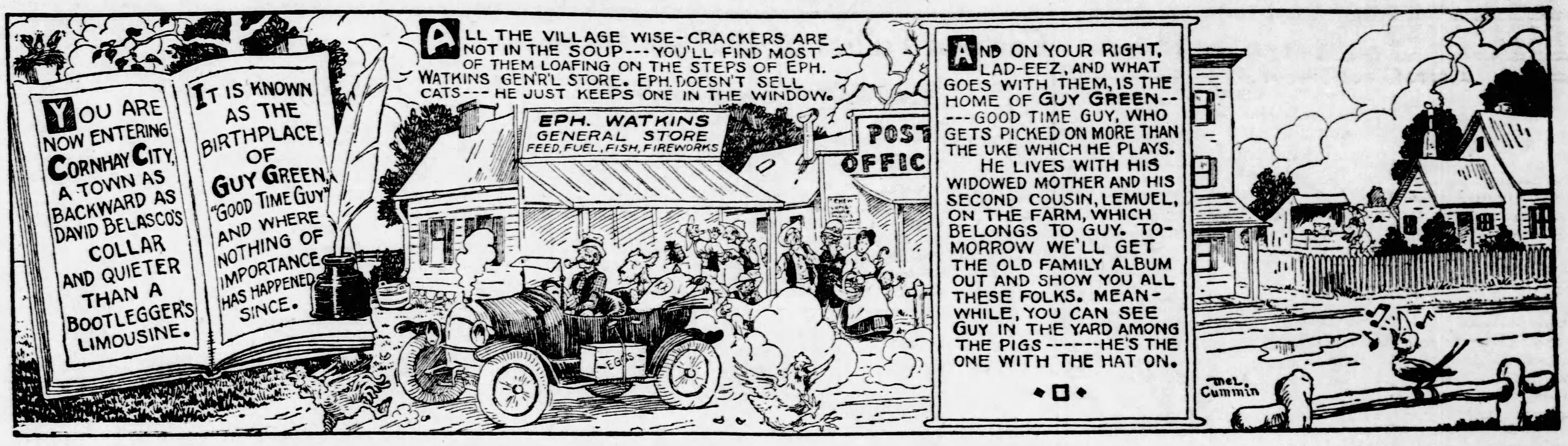
- The debut comic of Good Time Guy, published June 27, 1927
- Author: Frank Smiley
- Illustrator(s): Mel Cummin (1927–1928); Dick Huemer (1928–1929); Fred Fox (1929)
- Current status/schedule: Sunday comic (1984–1999); Daily comic (1999–present)
- Launch date: June 27, 1927
- End date: December 6, 1930
- Syndicate(s): Metropolitan Newspaper Service
- Genre: Humor

Good Time Guy is a humorous syndicated comic strip that was distributed by Metropolitan Newspaper Service from June 27, 1927, to December 6, 1930.

It was begun by prolific screenwriter William Conselman under the pen name of Frank Smiley, and well-established artist Mel Cummin. Cummin was succeeded the following year by Dick Huemer (1928–29), who was in turn followed by Fred Fox (1929).

== Characters and story ==
Ron Goulart wrote of Good Time Guy in his book The Funnies:

This one was about a hefty, freckle-faced small town young man, a 'well-meaning bumpkin,' with 'a heart as big as a pumpkin, only softer.' Guy had two big ambitions: 'To see everyone has a good time and to give uke lessons in Hawaii.' Guy Green lived with his widowed mother in Cornhay City and was too shy to pursue pretty, blond, Mary Laffer, even though 'she has eyes only for Guy — and what eyes!

Conselman's script was dense with "puns and complicated word-play". There was a strong element of serendipity in the strip, with Green's naive missteps leading unexpectedly into good fortune.
