= Kin Hubbard =

American cartoonist

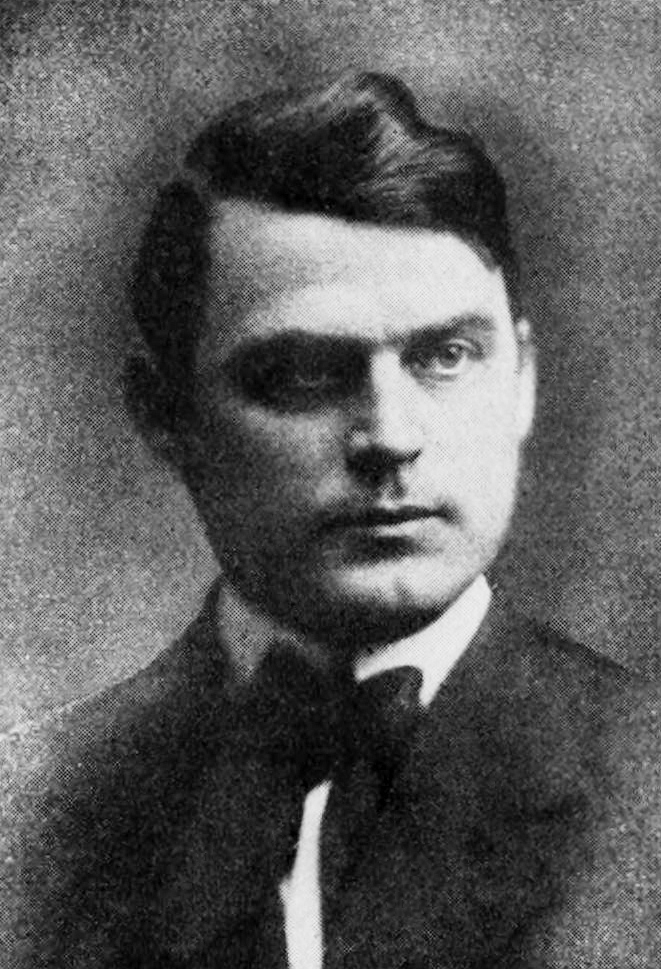
- Born: September 1, 1868; Bellefontaine, Ohio
- Died: December 26, 1930 (aged 62); Indianapolis, Indiana
- Resting place: Crown Hill Cemetery and Arboretum Community Mausoleum 39.8274766°N 86.1730061°W
- Occupations: Cartoonist, humorist, journalist
- Spouse: Josephine (Jackson) Hubbard
- Children: Two children who survived into adulthood; a son, Thomas (b. 1907) and a daughter, Virginia (b. 1909)
- Parent(s): Sarah Jane (Miller) and Thomas Hubbard
- Writing career
- Notable work: Abe Martin (comic strip)

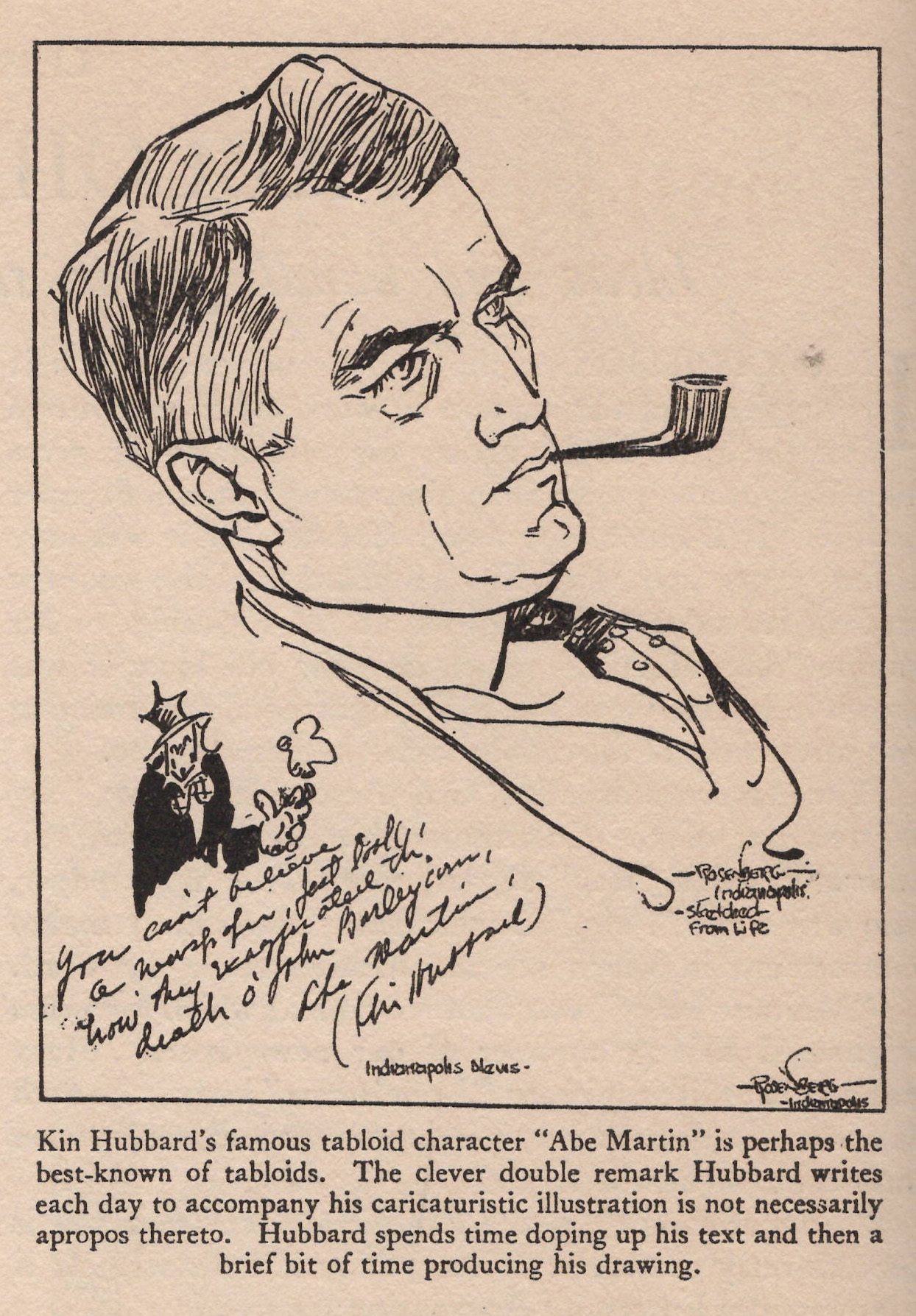
Signed drawing of Kin Hubbard by Manuel Rosenberg, 1926

Frank McKinney Hubbard (September 1, 1868 – December 26, 1930), better known as Kin Hubbard, was an American cartoonist, humorist, and journalist. His most famous work was for "Abe Martin". Introduced in The Indianapolis News in December 1904, the cartoon appeared six days a week on the back page of the News for twenty-six years. The Abe Martin cartoons went into national print syndication in 1910, eventually appearing in some two hundred U.S. newspapers. Hubbard also originated and illustrated a once-a-week humor essay for the "Short Furrows" column in the Sunday edition of the News that went into syndication in 1911. The self-taught artist and writer made more than eight thousand drawings for the Indianapolis News and wrote and illustrated about a thousand essays for the "Short Furrows" column. His first published book was Collection of Indiana Lawmaker and Lobbyists (1903), followed by an annual series of Abe Martin-related books between 1906 and 1930, as well as other works such as Short Furrows (1912) and Book of Indiana (1929). Humorist Will Rogers once declared that Hubbard was "America's greatest humorist".

A few months after introducing his Abe Martin cartoon in 1904, Hubbard moved the setting of his most famous character to the fictional town of Bloom Center in rural Brown County, Indiana. He also added more characters to the cartoon series over the years, typically communicated his many quips and sharp-eyed observations of everyday life by pairing two sentences of humorous, but unrelated observations, in each cartoon. For years after Hubbard's death in 1930, the Indianapolis News and other newspapers continued to print his Abe Martin cartoon series. In 1932, the Indiana Department of Natural Resources dedicated Brown County State Park to Hubbard and named the park's guest accommodations the Abe Martin Lodge. Hubbard was inducted into the Ohio Journalism Hall of Fame in 1939 and the Indiana Journalism Hall of Fame in 1967. His humor and quips remain in use and continue to entertain readers through the Abe Martin books, as well as Hubbard's longer essays, cartoons, and other published works.

== Early life and education ==
Frank McKinney Hubbard was born in Bellefontaine, Ohio, on September 1, 1868, and was always called as "Kin". His father, Thomas Hubbard, was the outspoken editor and publisher of the weekly Bellefontaine Examiner. After Grover Cleveland's election as U.S. president in 1884, Thomas Hubbard was appointed as the town's postmaster. Kin's mother, Sarah Jane (Miller) Hubbard, was a homemaker.

Kin Hubbard was the youngest child in the family that included his five older siblings (three boys: Ed, Horace, and Tom; and two girls: Josephine and Ada). He was the only one of the children to marry. Kin was named after Frank McKinney, an Ohio politician who was one of his father's friends.

Hubbard's artistic ability showed at an early age, but he was disinterested in school. Hubbard began drawing around the age of ten or eleven and became a self-taught artist and writer. He had little formal education beyond elementary school and almost no art training. Hubbard left the Bellefontaine schools at the age of thirteen before finishing the seventh grade. Later, he enrolled at the Jefferson School of Art in Detroit, Michigan, but remained in the school for only a few days before he quit.

== Marriage and family ==
Hubbard married Josephine Jackson on October 12, 1905. Jackson was born in Greencastle, Indiana, and moved with her family to Indianapolis, Indiana, during her youth. She graduated from Indianapolis's Shortridge High School and met Hubbard a short time later, when he was thirty-four years old. Kin nicknamed his wife "Tiny" although she was not small in stature.

Kin and Josephine Hubbard were the parents of two surviving children: a son named Thomas, born in 1907, and a daughter named Virginia, who was born in 1909. Kin Hubbard Jr. was killed in an automobile accident in 1919, when he was little more than a year old; another son died at birth in 1921. In 1909, the Hubbard family moved into a newly built home in Irvington, a suburban neighborhood of Indianapolis, and remained there for twenty years. A larger home for the family on North Meridian Street was completed in the fall of 1929.

Kin Hubbard loved the theater throughout his life and frequently attended theatrical performances and circus performances. In addition, he was an avid home gardener. Hubbard tended to avoid public appearances, preferring instead to live a quiet life, but enjoyed traveling, especially in his later years. Hubbard took a cruise to the Bahamas in 1923 and joined an around-the-world voyage aboard the Samaria in 1924. Kin and Josephine Hubbard also took trips to Miami, Florida, during the winter months.

== Career ==
=== Early years ===
Early in his career, Hubbard held several short-term jobs that included work at a paint shop, as a postmaster's clerk for his father, and as an engraver and silhouette artist. In 1891 Hubbard began working as illustrator at The Indianapolis News, but he left after three years to return home to Ohio.

Before resuming his career as an artist in Indianapolis in 1891, Hubbard continued travels in the South; found work at Chattanooga, Tennessee, as a mule-team driver; and worked as an amusement park gatekeeper in Cincinnati, Ohio. Hubbard also wrote and performed for the Grand Bellefontaine Operatic Minstrels and Professor Tom Wright's Operatic Solo Orchestra. In addition, he worked as an artist for the Cincinnati Tribune and the Mansfield, Ohio, News before the Indianapolis Sun hired him in 1899 as a sketch artist and caricaturist at a salary of $15 per week. Hubbard stayed at the Sun for two years, but rejoined the Indianapolis News staff in 1901.

=== Indianapolis News humorist ===
Hubbard initially began work for the Indianapolis News in 1891, after a friend showed John H. Holliday, the newspaper's owner and editor, some of Hubbard's humorous writings and drawings. His initial pay was a meager $12 per week. After three years at the News, Hubbard became frustrated with his limited drawing skills and returned to Ohio.

Hubbard rejoined the staff of the Indianapolis News in the fall of 1901 and continued to work at the newspaper for the remainder of his career. Hubbard became well known for his political caricatures, especially those of Indiana legislators and lobbyists, signing his political drawings as "Hub". Hubbard's first book, Collection of Indiana Lawmaker and Lobbyists, was published in 1903.

Hubbard was known for his humor, as well as his practical jokes around the office. He initially worked in a News department that other newspaper workers dubbed the "Idle Ward" because they thought its workers had plenty of leisure time to talk. In addition to Hubbard, the department's staff included reporter William Herschell, best known for his poem, "Ain't God Good to Indiana?", and fellow cartoonist Gaar Williams. After Hubbard gained notoriety for his Abe Martin cartoon, he was given a private office, where he continued to maintain a regular daily work schedule.

In addition to his famous Abe Martin cartoons, which were a feature in the News and went into national syndication in 1910, Hubbard wrote and illustrated a once-a-week humor essay for the "Short Furrows" series in the Sunday edition of the newspaper. These essays had Abe Martin as the by-line and went into syndicated distribution to other newspapers in 1911. Hubbard also selected essays for his book of the same title, which was published in 1912.

=== Creator of the Abe Martin cartoons ===
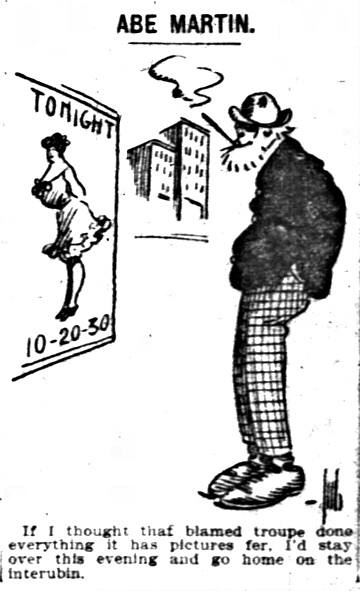
First Abe Martin cartoon, published December 17, 1904

Hubbard's most famous work was his creation of the cartoon character Abe Martin, "a rustic character that made a habit of commenting on legislators' foibles". His first Abe Martin drawing appeared in the Indianapolis News on December 17, 1904. The popular cartoon series, which remained the main focus of the cartoonist's work for the remainder of his life, was featured six days a week on the back page of the News for twenty-six years. It also appeared in syndication beginning in 1910.

Hubbard moved his Abe Martin character to rural Brown County, Indiana, on February 3, 1905. The scenic locale among the hills of southern Indiana provided Hubbard with additional inspiration to exaggerate Abe Martin's humorous comments. Over the years, Hubbard slightly changed Abe Martin's appearance and added more fictional characters to the series. These characters include, among others, Uncle Niles Turner, Miss Fawn Lippincott, Professor Alexander Tansey, Tell Binkley, and Hon. Ex-Editor Cale Fluhart. Although Hubbard's characters were composites of various people, rather than a single individual, their characteristics represented stereotypes of local judges, teachers, businessowners, and proprietors, as well as other inhabitants of the fictional town of Bloom Center, and were readily identifiable to his readers. Portions of the names for the characters came from people that Hubbard knew in Ohio. He also found inspiration for names of his characters from Kentucky jury lists.

The growing popularity of the Abe Martin cartoon lead to annual publications of related books beginning in November 1906 with the initial publication of Abe Martin of Brown County, Indiana, a compilation of Hubbard's works from the Indianapolis News. The cartoons also began to reach a wider newspaper audience in 1910 after Hubbard signed with the George Matthey Adams Syndicate. The syndicated Abe Martin cartoon series eventually appeared in approximately 200 cities. The News also continued to publish Abe Martin's sayings even after Hubbard's death in 1930.

Part of Martin's popularity was his rustic humor and sharp-eyed observations of everyday life. Hubbard communicated his humor using just a few words. His typical formula was pairing two sentences of humorous, but unrelated observations in each of his daily cartoons. Hubbard's signature style of writing also included liberal use of colloquialisms and contractions. For example: "When a feller says, "It hain't th' money but th' principle o' th' thing", it's the money."

== Death and legacy ==
Hubbard died from a sudden heart attack at his home on North Meridian Street in Indianapolis, Indiana, on December 26, 1930, at the age of sixty-two. He is best remembered as the humorist who created the Abe Martin cartoon and was described by a fellow News employee as "a genial Dapper Dan with the soul of an imp." During his career with the Indianapolis News, he made more than 8,000 drawings and wrote and illustrated approximately 1,000 essays for the "Short Furrows" column. Hubbard also published Abe Martin-related books on an annual basis. For years after Hubbard's death, the News and other newspapers continued to feature his Abe Martin cartoons. Hubbard's humor continues to entertain readers through his Abe Martin books, as well as Hubbard's longer essays and other works that were published between 1903 and 1930.

== Honors and tributes ==
- Hoosier poet James Whitcomb Riley, wrote, "Riley's Tribute," a poem dedicated to Abe Martin's comical humor and the creator of the famous caricature. Hubbard included Riley's poem in his first Abe Martin book, Abe Martin of Brown County, Indiana, which initially was published in the fall of 1906.
- George Ade, a noted Hoosier humorist, playwright, and author, wrote "Abe Martin of Brown County," praising of Hubbard and his cartoon character. The article appeared in the May 1910 issue of American magazine and increased national awareness and the popularity of Hubbard's work, which went into national syndication later that year.
- Hubbard's friend and fellow American humorist Will Rogers declared Hubbard was "America's greatest humorist." Rogers also commented: "Just think –– only two lines a day, yet he expressed more original philosophy in 'em than all the rest of the paper combined."
- In 1927, Hubbard and other American cartoonists that included Gaar Williams, John T. McCutcheon (creator of the 1931 Pulitzer Prize-winning editorial cartoon, The Wise Economist Asks A Question), Harold Gray (famous for the Little Orphan Annie comic strip), and Fontaine Fox (creator of the Toonerville Folks comics) had their work featured in the annual Hoosier Salon art exhibition.
- At the time of Hubbard's death in 1930, McCutcheon, a noted cartoonist for the Chicago Tribune, published a cartoon showing Hubbard's grief-stricken characters standing at their creator's door.
- In May 1932, two years after Hubbard's death, the Indiana Department of Natural Resources dedicated Brown County State Park to Hubbard. The park's Abe Martin Lodge stands on Kin Hubbard Ridge. The lodge's twenty cabins are named after characters in the Abe Martin cartoons.
- In October 1939, Ohio State University added Hubbard's name to the Ohio Journalism Hall of Fame.
- American playwright, screenwriter, and journalist Lawrence Riley wrote the biographical play, Kin Hubbard (1949), in his memory. It starred Tom Ewell and June Lockhart.
- Hubbard was named to the Indiana Journalism Hall of Fame in 1967.
- In August 1982, the City of Indianapolis dedicated the Kin Hubbard Memorial Park with Hubbard's children, Thomas and Virginia, in attendance.

== Selected published works ==
- Collection of Indiana Lawmakers and Lobbyists (1903).
- Abe Martin of Brown County, Indiana (1907). Compiled from The Indianapolis News.
- Abe Martin's Almanack (1907, 1908, 1911, 1921).
- Abe Martin's Brown County Almanack (1909).
- Brown County Folks (1910).
- Short Furrows (1912).
- Back County Folks (1913).
- Abe Martin's Primer (1914). Illustrations by Francis Gallup.
- Abe Martin's Sayings and Sketches (1915).
- Abe Martin's Back Country Sayings (1917). Compiled from the Indianapolis News; revised and edited by Hubbard.
- Abe Martin on the War and Other Things (1918). Compiled from the News; revised, edited, and illustrated by Hubbard.
- Abe Martin's Home Cured Philosophy (1919).
- Abe Martin, the Joker on Facts (1920).
- These Days (1922).
- Fifty Two Weeks of Abe Martin (1924).
- Abe Martin on Things in General (1925).
- Abe Martin, Hoss Sense and Nonsense (1926).
- Abe Martin's Wise Cracks and Skunk Ridge Papers (1927).
- Abe Martin's Barbed Wire (1928).
- Abe Martin's Town Pump (1929).
- Book of Indiana (1929). Compiled under the direction of James O. Jones.
- Abe Martin's Broadcast (1930)
- Abe Martin's Wisecracks (1930). Selections by E. V. Lucas.

== Selected quotes ==
- "Don't knock th' weather. Nine-tenths o' th' people couldn' start a conversation if it didn' change once in a while."
- "Flattery won't hurt you if you don't swallow it."
- "Nobuddy ever forgets where he buried a hatchet."
- "Nobuddy can be as agreeable as an uninvited guest."
- "Now an' then an innocent man is sent t' the legislature."
- "We'd all like t' vote fer th' best man, but he's never a candidate. General Apathy has put a good many men in office, but it takes old High Taxes to yank them out."
- "When a feller says, 'It hain't th' money but th' principle o' th' thing,' it's the money."
- "There's no secret about success. Did you ever know a successful man who didn't tell you about it?"
- "There is no failure except in no longer trying. There is no defeat except from within, no really insurmountable barrier save our own inherent weakness of purpose."
- "There is plenty of peace in any home where the family doesn't make the mistake of trying to get together."
- "The only way to entertain some folks is to listen to them."
- "The fellow that owns his own home is always just coming out of a hardware store. A living wage depends mostly on who we're living with. Nothing turns the house upside down like a sick fat man."
- "Lots of folks confuse bad management with destiny."
- "Nothing will dispel enthusiasm like a small admission fee."
- "Boys will be boys, and so will a lot of middle-aged men."
- "You won't skid if you stay in a rut."
- "Fun is like life insurance; the older you get, the more it costs."

== In popular culture ==
Hubbard's quip, "It's no disgrace t' be poor, but it might as well be", was mentioned in Kurt Vonnegut's novels, Slaughterhouse Five and God Bless You Mr. Rosewater.

== Sources ==
- "American humorist Will Rogers (left) with his friend Kin Hubbard". Soundscapes.info. Archived from the original on January 2, 2019.
- Banta, R. E., compiler (1949). Indiana Authors and Their Books, 1816–1916. Crawfordsville, Indiana: Wabash College. pp. 160–64. OCLC 1044959.
- Boomhower, Ray (Fall 1993). "A 'Dapper Dan with the Soul of an Imp': Kin Hubbard, Creator of Abe Martin". Traces of Indiana and Midwestern History. 5 (4). Indianapolis: Indiana Historical Society: 38–45.
- "Brown County State Park: Abe Martin History". Brown County State Park. Archived from the original on September 1, 2015.
- Gugin, Linda C.; St. Clair, James E., eds. (2015). Indiana's 200: The People Who Shaped the Hoosier State. Indianapolis: Indiana Historical Society Press. ISBN 978-0-87195-387-2.
- Hawes, David S., ed. (1984). The Best of Kin Hubbard. Bloomington: Indiana University Press. ISBN 0253106117.
- Hubartt, Kerry L. (26 February 1967). "Frank McKinny (Kin) Hubbard * 1967". Indiana Journalism Hall of Fame. Archived from the original on 18 October 2019.
- Kelly, Fred C. (1952). The Life and Times of Kin Hubbard, Creator of Abe Martin. New York: Farrar, Staus and Young.
- Newton, Judith Vale, and Carol Ann Weiss (1993). A Grand Tradition: The Arts and Artists of the Hoosier Salon, 1925 –1990. Indianapolis, Indiana: Hoosier Salon Patrons Association.
- Stroube, Jack A. (1970). The Hoosier Humor of Kin Hubbard (1868–1930). Atlanta, Georgia: Genesis Press–Hallux.
