= Fred Waring =

American musician (1900–1984)

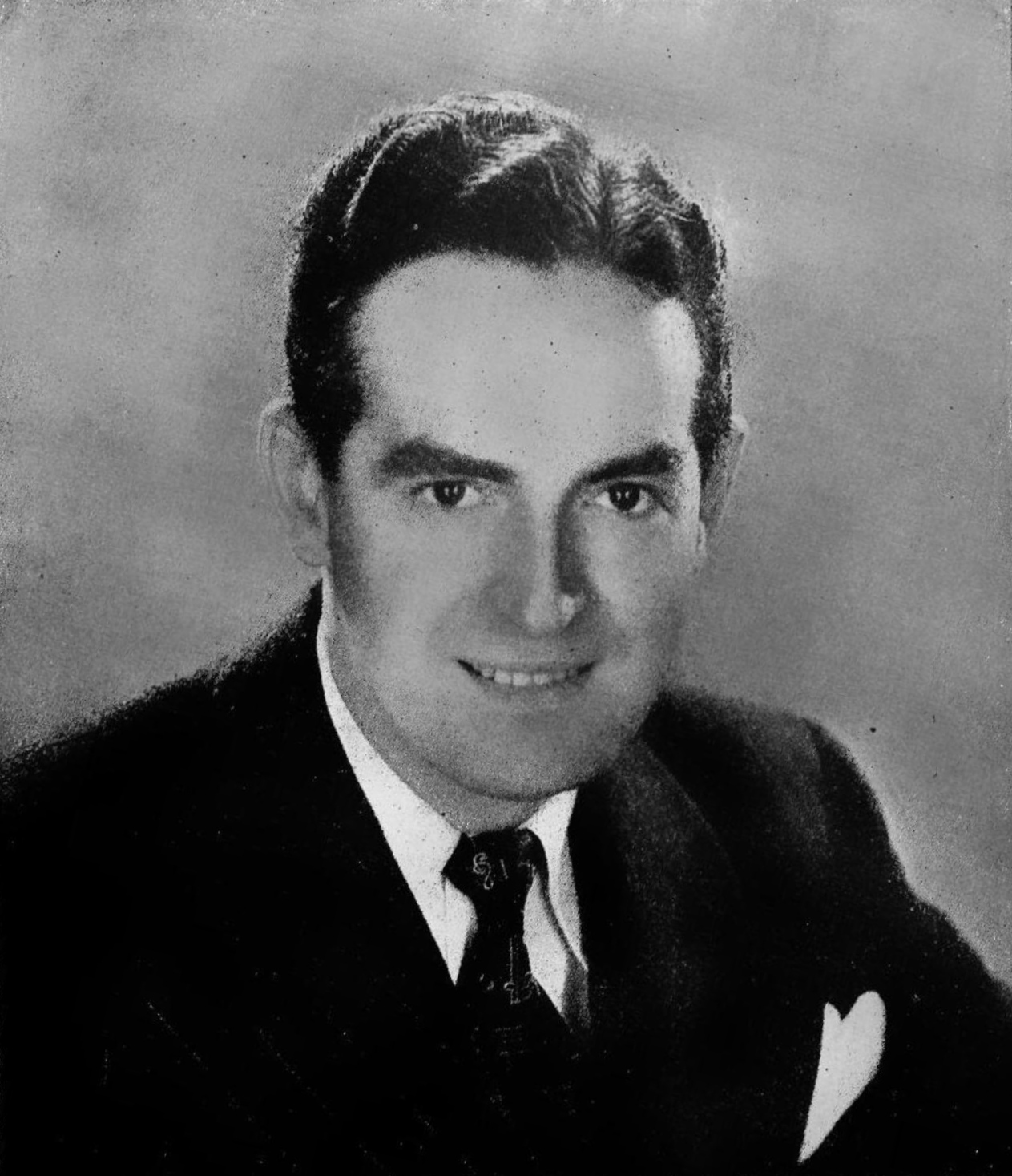
- Fred Waring in a 1944 advertisement

Background information
- Born: Fredrick Malcolm Waring; June 9, 1900; Tyrone, Pennsylvania, U.S.
- Died: July 29, 1984 (aged 84) Danville, Pennsylvania, U.S.
- Genres: Jazz, traditional pop
- Occupations: Musician, bandleader, radio and TV personality
- Instruments: Vocals, banjo
- Years active: 1923–1984

Fredrick Malcolm Waring Sr. (June 9, 1900 – July 29, 1984) was an American musician, bandleader, choral director, and radio and television personality, sometimes referred to as "America's Singing Master" and "The Man Who Taught America How to Sing". He was also a promoter, financial backer and eponym of the Waring Blendor, the first modern electric food blender on the market.

Waring was elected Shepherd (president) of The Lambs in November 1939, succeeding William Gaxton. He led the theatrical club until 1942.

== Biography ==
Fredrick Malcolm Waring was born in Tyrone, Pennsylvania, on June 9, 1900, to Jesse Calderwood and Frank Waring. During his teen years, Waring, his brother Tom (né Thomas Lincoln Waring; 1902–1960), and their friend Poley McClintock founded the Waring-McClintock Snap Orchestra, which evolved into Fred Waring's Banjo Orchestra. The band often played at fraternity parties, proms, and dances, and achieved local success.

Waring attended Penn State University, where he studied architectural engineering. He aspired to be in the Penn State Glee Club, but he was rejected with every audition. His Banjo Orchestra became so successful that he decided to abandon his education to tour with the band, which eventually became known as Fred Waring and His Pennsylvanians.

He married Dorothy McAteer, his college sweetheart, in 1923 but divorced her in 1929. He remarried in 1933 to Evelyn Nair (1910–2004); the couple had three children, Dixie, Fred Jr., and William. They divorced in 1954, following which Waring married Virginia Clotfelter (died 2013), adopted Virginia's son Paul from her previous marriage, and fathered a son, Malcolm. Fred Waring Jr. was a conductor and jazz trombonist. Grandson Jordan Waring is an orchestral composer.

== Career ==
=== Records and radio ===
In 1922, Waring’s band attracted attention at a University of Michigan student festival in a gymnasium in Ann Arbor, Mich., leading to a six-week booking at a local theater. That engagement led to bookings in Detroit and other large cities, launching Waring’s national career.

From 1923 until late 1932, "Waring's Pennsylvanians" were among Victor Records' bestselling bands. In late 1932, Waring abruptly quit recording, although his band continued to perform on radio. In 1933, "You Gotta Be a Football Hero" was performed on radio to great acclaim. His 1930 recording of "Love for Sale" by Cole Porter is one of the few period versions of this popular song.

Waring and the Pennsylvanians appeared in the 1937 Warner Bros. musical film Varsity Show, directed by William Keighley and Busby Berkeley.

The Fred Waring Show was heard on radio in various forms from 1933 to 1957.

Adding a men's singing group to his ensemble, he recruited Robert Shaw, recently out of the Pomona College glee club, to train his singers. Shaw later founded the Robert Shaw Chorale and directed the Atlanta Symphony Orchestra and Chorus. Pembroke Davenport (1911–1985) was Waring's pianist and arranger.

During World War II, Waring and his ensemble appeared at war bond rallies and entertained the troops at training camps. He composed and performed dozens of patriotic songs, his most famous being "My America". In 1943, he acquired the Buckwood Inn in Shawnee on Delaware, Pennsylvania, and renamed the resort the Shawnee Inn. To promote the inn, he centered his musical activities at the inn itself. He created, rehearsed, and broadcast his radio programs from the stage of Shawnee's Worthington Hall throughout the 1950s.

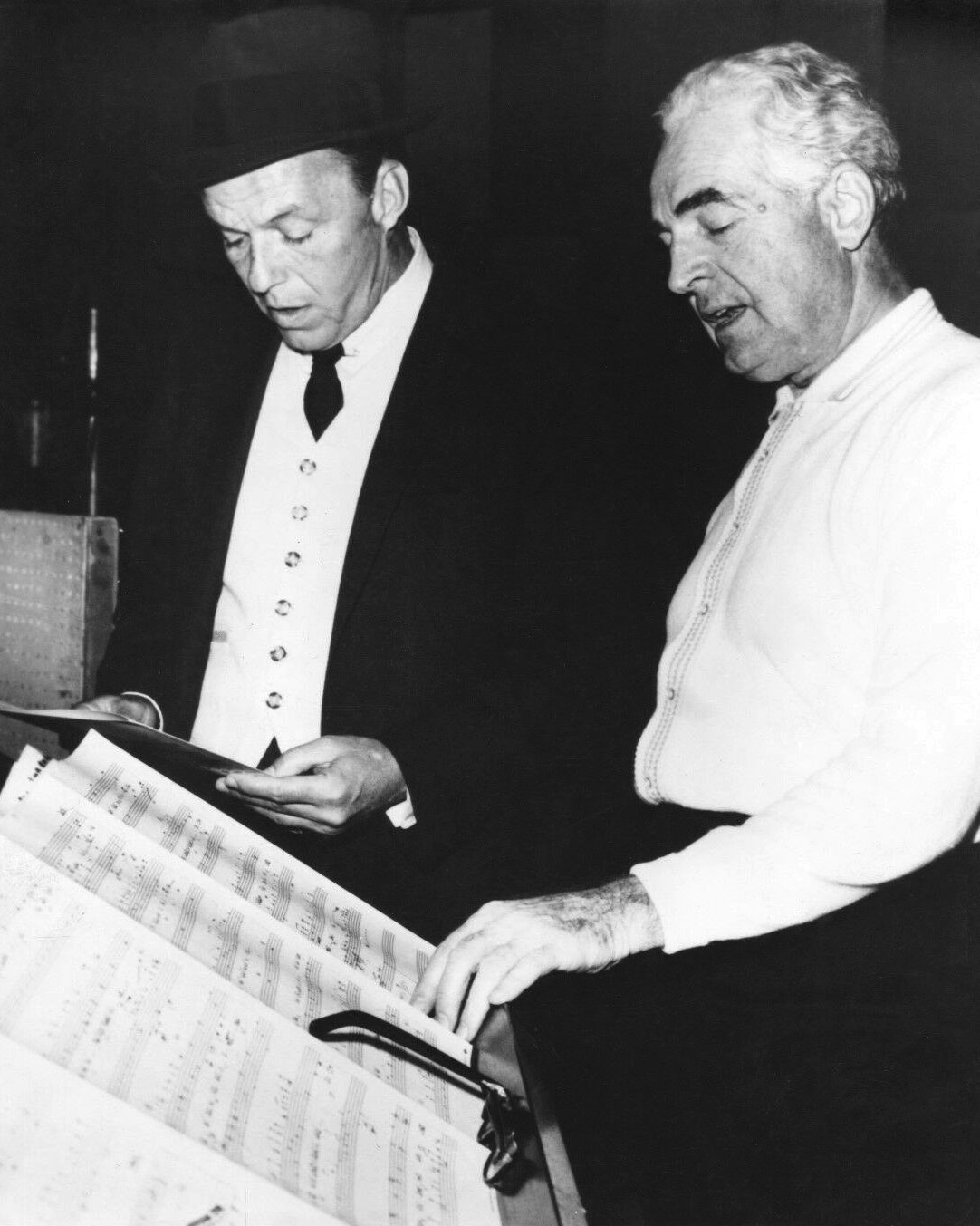
Waring in the studio with Sinatra, 1964

During the 1940s and early 1950s, Waring and His Pennsylvanians produced a string of hits, selling millions of records. A few of his many choral hits include "Sleep", "Battle Hymn of the Republic", "Smoke Gets in Your Eyes", "Button Up Your Overcoat", "White Christmas", "Give Me Your Tired, Your Poor", and "Dancing in the Dark". In 1964 he recorded two albums with Frank Sinatra and Bing Crosby: America, I Hear You Singing and 12 Songs of Christmas, for Sinatra's Reprise label.

His suite Grandma's Thanksgiving, which extrapolates "Over the River and Through the Wood," remains a traditional staple of WBEN in Buffalo, New York each Thanksgiving; "A Christmas Card," an original Christmas choral piece, is prominently featured as the second song in the playlist of the original WPIX Yule Log (which features two other Waring records).

The song, "Breezin' Along with the Breeze" was used as a signature tune by Fred Waring.

=== Choral workshops ===
In 1947, Waring organized the Fred Waring Choral Workshop at his Pennsylvania headquarters in the old Castle Inn in Delaware Water Gap, Pennsylvania, which was also the home of Shawnee Press, the music publisher which he founded. At these sessions, musicians learned to sing with precision, sensitivity, and enthusiasm. When these vocalists returned home and shared what they had learned with fellow musicians, Waring's approach to choral singing spread throughout the nation. The first Fred Waring Music Workshop in the western United States was held in June 1968 as part of the University of Nevada's Summer Session curriculum in Reno, Nevada. Waring taught and supervised these summer workshop for 37 years until he died.

=== Television ===
Waring expanded into television with The Fred Waring Show, which ran on CBS Television from June 20, 1948, to May 30, 1954, and received several awards for Best Musical Program. (The show was 60 minutes long until January 1952, and 30 minutes thereafter.) In the 1960s and 1970s, popular musical tastes turned from choral music, but Waring changed with the times, introducing his Young Pennsylvanians, a group of fresh-faced, long-haired, bell-bottomed performers who sang old favorites and choral arrangements of contemporary songs. In this way he continued as a popular touring attraction, logging some 40,000 miles a year.

=== Waring blender ===
A logo used by Waring Corporation in the 1970s

In the 1930s, inventor Frederick Jacob Osius went to Waring for financial backing for an electric blender he had patented. The Osius patent (U.S. patent 2,109,501) was filed March 13, 1937, and awarded March 1, 1938. A patent for the technology was granted in the United States, Canada, and France.

After an initial $25,000 investment, the Waring-owned Miracle Mixer was introduced to the public at the National Restaurant Show in Chicago retailing for $29.75. In 1938, Fred Waring renamed his Miracle Mixer Corporation as the Waring Corporation, and the mixer's name was changed to the Waring Blendor (the "o" in blendor giving it a slight distinction from "blender").

The Waring Blendor became an important tool in hospitals for the implementation of specific diets, as well as a vital scientific research device. Jonas Salk used it while developing his polio vaccine. In 1954, the millionth Waring Blendor was sold.

Waring became a division of the Conair Corporation.

== Death ==
Waring suffered a stroke at his summer home in State College, Pennsylvania and died on July 29, 1984, in a Danville, Pennsylvania, hospital. after videotaping a concert with his ensemble and completing his annual summer choral workshop. He conducted many such workshops at Penn State in his later years, and in 1984, designated Penn State to house his collection of archives and memorabilia. He also served his alma mater as a trustee and was named a distinguished alumnus of the university.

== Awards and honors ==
In 1983, the 83-year-old Waring was awarded the Congressional Gold Medal, the nation's highest honor for a civilian.

Although many believe that Waring Commons at Penn State is named for him, it is actually named for his grandfather, William Waring. Fred Waring Drive is a major arterial road in the Palm Desert–Indio area of Southern California where many major roads are named for post-World War II-era entertainers. Waring Drive in Delaware Water Gap which runs alongside the Castle Inn, Waring's base of operations for over 50 years, was named for Waring in 1991. The Waring Golf Course north of Harrisburg, Pennsylvania, was named after Waring, and he had an ownership interest in it. It ceased operation around 1960.

In 1997, a Golden Palm Star on the Palm Springs Walk of Stars was dedicated to him.

== Comic strip collection ==
Cartoon by Chester Gould from the Fred Waring collection

Waring was a cartoon and comic strip collector. A Penn State meeting room by the West Wing restaurant has dozens of cartoons drawn by artists such as Al Hirschfeld in Waring's honor.

From 1943 to 1974, Waring owned the Shawnee Inn and Country Club, a golf resort located at Shawnee on Delaware, Pennsylvania near Stroudsburg. In 1948, two years after the National Cartoonists Society was formed, Waring invited members of that organization to spend a day at the Shawnee Inn. It became an annual event, held each June for the next 25 years, resulting in a huge collection of artwork created for Waring by the cartoonists, including many drawn on Shawnee Inn stationery. The Fred Waring Collection has more than 600 cartoon originals, including over 50 of the laminated table tops.

Artists who contributed to the Waring Collection included Jay Alan, Alfred Andriola (Kerry Drake), Jim Berry (Berry's World), Charles Biro (Squeeks, Crimebuster, Daredevil), Martin Branner (Denny Dimwit), Ernie Bushmiller (Nancy), Milton Caniff (Steve Canyon), Mel Casson (Jeff Crockett), Chon Day, Steve Douglas, Bill Dyer (Patsy), Gus Edson (The Gumps), Eric Ericson, Gill Fox (Foodini). Frank Godwin (Rusty Riley, Patty Miles), Irwin Hasen (Dondi), Jeff Hayes (Silent Sam), Art Helfant (Patty Pinhead), Bill Holman (Smokey Stover), Stan Kaye, Bil Keane (Family Circus), Jeff Keate, Reamer Keller, Ted Key (Hazel), Lank Leonard (Mickey Finn), Jack Markow, Jay McArdle, Bill McLean (Double Trouble), Paul Norris (Jungle Jim), Bob Oksner (Leave It to Binky), Russell Patterson (Mamie), Clarence D. Russell (Pete the Tramp), Don Trachte (Henry) and George Wunder (Terry and the Pirates).

== See also ==
- Billy Ireland Cartoon Library & Museum
- List of newspaper comic strips
- Michigan State University Comic Art Collection
