= The Gumps (radio series) =

American radio sitcom broadcast 1931-1937

- Genre: Radio sitcom
- Running time: 15 minutes.
- Country of origin: United States
- Language: English
- Syndicates: CBS Radio
- Written by: Irwin Shaw
- Directed by: Himan Brown
- Original release: 1931 – July 2, 1937
- Sponsored by: Korn Products, Karo Syrup, Pebeco Toothpaste

The Gumps is an American radio sitcom broadcast from 1931 until 1937, mostly on CBS Radio, and based on the popular Sidney Smith newspaper comic strip The Gumps. It was the first radio adaptation of comics.

== Concept ==
The Gumps are portrayed as a cranky couple. The biographer of writer Irwin Shaw describes them as the "Archie Bunker and Edith Bunker of their day."

== History ==
The show first aired on WGN Chicago from 1931 until November 5, 1934. From 1934 until 1937 it aired on CBS Radio.

In the fall of 1925 WGN executive Ben McCanna believed that a dramatic serial could work just as well on radio as it did with the daily comic strips in newspapers. But when he approached actors and WGN employees Freeman Gosden and Charles Correll to adapt The Gumps to radio, they declined and instead devised their own characters for the 1926–27 WGN radio serial, Sam 'n' Henry. After reworking these characters for Amos 'n' Andy in 1928–29, while borrowing certain elements from The Gumps, they were on their way to becoming millionaires, and the radio serial format they created soon became the model for many other serialized radio dramas.

The Gumps eventually arrived on WGN in 1931. The series later moved to CBS for a four-year run (1934–1937), produced and directed by Himan Brown with scripts by Irwin Shaw. Shaw had been scripting the Dick Tracy radio series, when Brown asked him if he thought he could write comedy. Brown later said, "He was sensational". Karo Syrup and Pebeco toothpaste/tooth powder were the sponsors.

== Cast ==
- Andy Gump: Jack Boyle (actor), Wilmer Walter
- Min Gump: Dorothy Denvir, Agnes Moorehead
- Chester Gump: Charles Flynn (actor), Lester Jay, Jackie Kelk
- Tilda the maid: Bess Flynn

== Legacy ==
According to historian Elizabeth McLeod in the "Andy Gump to Andy Brown" section of her popular culture essay, and her book, The Original Amos 'n' Andy, "The Gumps" comic strip was the forefather of radio and TV sitcoms and serialized dramas. It was also the first radio show based on a comic strip.
