= Travis Pickin' =

1981 studio album by Merle Travis

Travis Pickin' is an all-instrumental acoustic solo album by American country guitarist Merle Travis released by the CMH Records label in 1981 as an LP recording. It was not released on compact disc, but was made available for download in 2018. Travis was nominated for the Grammy Award for Best Country Instrumental Performance for the album in 1981.

== LP record track listing ==
=== Side One ===
1. Rose Time (re-recording) - 1:37
2. There'll Be Some Changes Made - 2:31
3. Born To Lose (Ted Daffan) - 2:52
4. Too Tight Rag (M. Christian) - 1:45
5. You're Nobody till Somebody Loves You - 2:26
6. Night Sounds (M. Travis) - 1:34
7. Sugar Moon - 2:40

=== Side Two ===
1. White Heat (M. Christian) - 1:20
2. Midnight Special - 3:48
3. The World Is Waiting for the Sunrise - 1:23
4. Sleep (Earl Burtnett, Adam Geibel) - 2:39
5. Love Letters in the Sand - 2:15
6. Drifting And Dreaming (E. Van Alstyne, L. Curtis, H. Gillespie, E. R. Schmidt) - 2:29
7. Sing Baby Sing (L. Pollack, J. Yellen) - 2:14
