= The Fred Waring Show (radio program) =

American radio program

- Other names: Chesterfield Time; Pleasure Time
- Genre: Musical variety
- Country of origin: United States
- Language: English
- Syndicates: ABC; Blue Network; CBS; NBC
- TV adaptations: The Fred Waring Show
- Announcer: Paul Douglas
- Produced by: Tom Bennett
- Original release: February 8, 1933 – October 4, 1957
- Sponsored by: American Meat Company; Bromo Quinine; Chesterfield cigarettes Ford Motor Company; General Electric; Johnson's Wax; Old Gold cigarettes

The Fred Waring Show is an American old-time radio musical variety program. It was broadcast in a variety of time slots from February 8, 1933, until October 4, 1957, and was heard at different times on ABC, CBS, NBC, and the Blue Network. The program was sometimes called Chesterfield Time or Pleasure Time.

Musician Fred Waring starred in the shows, which featured his orchestra and chorus. An article in the trade publication Broadcasting described Waring's programs on radio (and later on television) as featuring "friendly banter with his crew, plus renditions of old-time favorite songs and ballads by the chorus and vocalists."

The program's producers through the years included Tom Bennett. Announcers included Paul Douglas and Bill Bivens.

Waring's programs were usually broadcast from the Shawnee Inn in Shawnee on Delaware, Pennsylvania, a facility that he acquired and renamed, transforming the venue into the center of his musical activities.

== Versions ==
Waring's broadcasts were heard on the schedule shown in the table below.

Beginning Date	Ending Date	Network	Day	Sponsor
February 8, 1933	January 31, 1934	CBS	Wednesday	Old Gold cigarettes
February 4, 1934	December 29, 1936	CBS	various days	Ford Motor Company
January 17, 1936	December 25, 1936	Blue	Friday	Ford Motor Company
October 8, 1938	March 4, 1939	NBC	Saturday	Bromo Quinine
June 19, 1939	June 9, 1944	NBC	weekdays	Chesterfield cigarettes
September 7, 1944	May 31, 1945	Blue	Thursday	--------
June 4, 1945	July 8, 1949	NBC	weekdays (daytime)	American Meat Company, Florida Citrus Growers
June 18, 1946	September 24, 1946	NBC	Tuesday	Johnson's Wax
June 24, 1947	September 30, 1947	NBC	Tuesday	Johnson's Wax
June 7, 1948	September 29, 1948	NBC	Mondays and Wednesdays (daytime)	Johnson's Wax
October 6, 1947	September 29, 1949	NBC	Mondays (1947-1948) Thursdays (1948-1949)	General Electric
July 16, 1949	July 22, 1950	NBC	Saturday	Minnesota Canning Company
October 1, 1956	March 15, 1957	ABC	weekdays (daytime)	--------
April 9, 1957	October 4, 1957	ABC	weekdays	--------

Source: On the Air: The Encyclopedia of Old-Time Radio

== Transcriptions for Ford ==
In 1935, Ford Motor Company used transcriptions from Waring's CBS broadcasts to promote the new 1935 Ford V8 automobile. The World Broadcasting System produced three 15-minute transcriptions for distribution to 300 radio stations vial local Ford dealers.

Those transcriptions were key in establishing a musical artist's legal rights with regard to recordings of performances. In 1939, A United States District court in North Carolina granted Waring an injunction against using a transcription without his authorization. Waring had sued Richard Austin Dunlea, who owned radio station WMFD in Wilmington, North Carolina, after the station broadcast an excerpt from a transcription despite the station's not being designated for use of the transcription. Judge Isaac M. Meekins' ruling said, in part: "Complainant has a property right in his performance. Complainant by mental labor creates something which is the subject of sale ... It is his work, his property ..."

The ruling in North Carolina followed a similar decision in Pennsylvania, in which a state court said that radio station WDAS had to have Waring's permission to broadcast recordings that he had made.
