= The Fred Waring Show =

American TV musical variety show

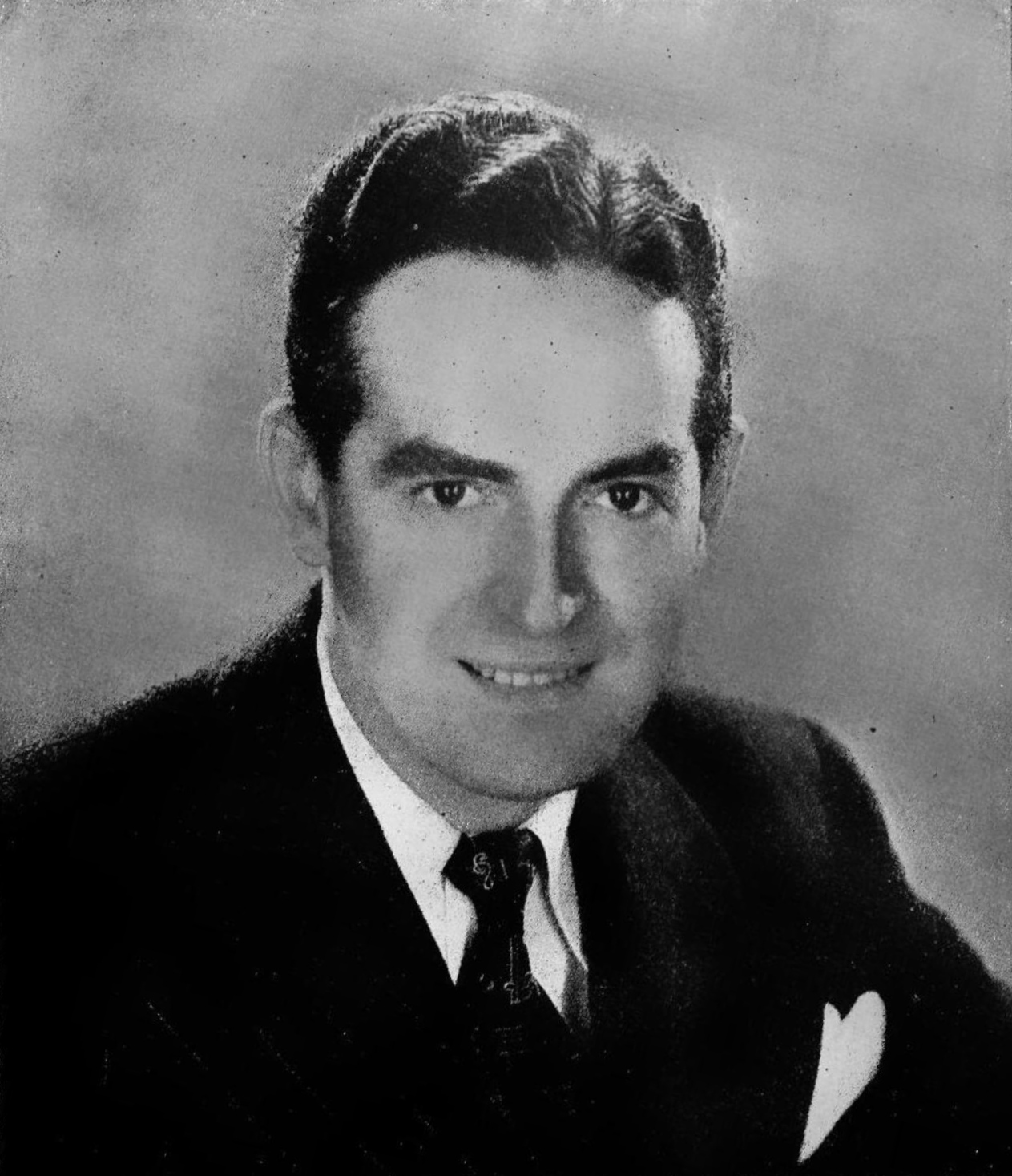
- Fred Waring (Billboard 1944 Music Yearbook)
- Genre: Musical variety
- Directed by: Bob Banner
- Presented by: Fred Waring
- Theme music composer: Earl Burtnett, Adam Geibel
- Opening theme: "Sleep"
- Country of origin: United States
- Original language: English

Production
- Producer: Bob Banner
- Camera setup: Multi-camera
- Running time: 52 minutes (1949–January 1952); 24 minutes (January 1952–1954)

Original release
- Network: CBS
- Release: April 17, 1949 – May 30, 1954

The Fred Waring Show is an American television musical variety show that ran from April 17, 1949 to May 30, 1954 on CBS. The show was hosted by Fred Waring and featured his choral group "The Pennsylvanians".

== Synopsis ==
Sponsored by General Electric, the series aired every Sunday night at 9 p.m. after The Ed Sullivan Show, excluding the summer months. It was initially 60 minutes in length, but its time slot was cut to 30 minutes beginning in January 1952. During the 1954 season, the show alternated on Sunday nights with General Electric Theater. Focusing on currently popular music and standard tunes, the show included performances by his orchestra and large chorus, as well as dancing and sketches. Guest performers included June Havoc.

The show's theme was "Sleep", which was composed by Earl Burtnett and Adam Geibel. Bob Banner was the producer and director.

In 1957, The Fred Waring Show made a brief return to television as a summer replacement daytime series in the time slot usually occupied by The Garry Moore Show. This version originated from a resort operated by Waring at Shawnee on Delaware, Pennsylvania.

A review of the program in the trade publication Broadcasting described the program as featuring "friendly banter with his crew, plus renditions of old-time favorite songs and ballads by the chorus and vocalists."

== Conflict over control ==
Producing the early Waring show caused conflicts between Waring and network officials over whether he should adapt performances to fit the new medium or whether TV should adapt its procedures to accommodate Waring's group's performances. Murray Forman wrote in his book, One Night on TV Is Worth Weeks at the Paramount: Popular Music on Early Television, "Fred Waring wrestled with CBS executives for direct input in the production and performances on his program ... seeking to assert greater autonomy and control over the show's musical performances."

== Critical response ==
A review of the show's 1951 premiere episode in the trade publication Billboard called it "the model TV music show". The review complimented Waring's skill in producing a "smooth-running show with sparkle, change of pace and imagination". It pointed out the variety of songs, each complemented by a high-quality setting, and noted that Waring was "well-advised" in selecting "down to earth" numbers for the show.
