= Gus Edson =

American cartoonist

Gus Edson

Gus Edson (né Edelstein; September 20, 1901 – September 26, 1966) was an American cartoonist known for two popular, long running comic strips, The Gumps and Dondi.

== Early life and career ==
Comic strip within a strip: Min reads The Gumps in Gus Edson's The Gumps page with Edson's Cousin Juniper strip at bottom (January 23, 1955).

Born to Max and Emma Edelstein in Cincinnati, Ohio, Gus Edson dropped out of school at age 17 to join the Army, serving in Australia in 1918. After his discharge, he studied briefly at Pratt Institute and the Art Students League. Edson was a sports cartoonist with the New York Evening Graphic from 1925 to 1928, followed by a year with the Paul Block Chain of Newspapers and a year at the New York Evening Post.

Along with his freelance work, he was a standby ghost for King Features Syndicate, eventually arriving at the Daily News as a sports cartoonist (1931–35). In 1933, while at the Daily News, he created his first daily comic strip, Streaky, which he wrote until 1935.

== The Gumps ==
When Sidney Smith, creator of The Gumps, died suddenly in 1935, Edson took over Smith's strip. Two years later, there was a continuity problem, as noted in Editor & Publisher:

Gus Edson, who has been carrying on the Andy Gump assignment, reported to his office at the Chicago Tribune-New York News Syndicate and found a mail stack of more than 100 letters waiting for him, all containing reminders, in one form or another, that the two principals in the current chapter of the Gump strip, who are planning marriage, have been wed before. When the artist contemplated marrying off Tom Carr and the Widow Zander, after the former had been released from prison, his staff reminded him that the couple had been married previously in the story of the strip some eight years ago and then had drifted apart when the Widow Zander's husband, believed to be dead, had returned. Edson's firm conviction that no one would remember the previous situation was rocked when he was faced with the mail-bag full of reminders.

Edson wrote and drew The Gumps for 24 years. His assistant on The Gumps in the early 1950s was the actor Martin Landau. Cousin Juniper was a topper strip which Edson also drew for his Sunday page. Edson helped sell war bonds during World War II, and he traveled around the world entertaining troops with his amusing chalk talks.

== Radio ==
In March 1948, Edson was heard on ABC's America's Town Meeting of the Air. During the discussion "What's Wrong with Comics?", Edson questioned panelist John Mason Brown, challenging Brown's negative notions about comic strips.

== Dondi ==
In the early 1950s, Edson was one of several National Cartoonists Society members who participated in European USO Tours. After a visit to Germany, he created Dondi in 1955 with Irwin Hasen. In 1957, Edson recalled the origin of the strip:

My search for the perfect collaborator came to a sudden and successful conclusion on a lovely May morning in 1954, in storybook Heidelberg. How clearly its details pierce the dimming mists of time! I was at breakfast with a diminutive artist, name of Hasen. Casually I remarked on the excellence of our Spiegel Eier. He wept. My interest was piqued. "Why do you weep?" I inquired. "Because the Spiegel Eier tastes so good," he simpered. That was all. But it was everything! Here indeed was the understanding heart for which I would have combed the world!... One more date in the saga of our collaboration fell on September 26, 1955. An important executive named Moe Reilly gave Dondi a job. "How's he doing?" you ask. Modesty forces me to admit that the kid is getting along so well that Hasen and I are now living the life of Reilly. In case you care, this is how we collaborate. I lock myself in a small-type room (you know where). Two days later, I stagger out with a whole roll— er, ream of scribbling. These brain squeezings I then boil down into the written material for six daily strips and a Sunday page. Since I can't typewrite, I prepare two clean longhand copies, one of which I relay to Hasen. He takes it from there (and beautifully!). The other copy goes to editor Moe Reilly. Once a month, Hasen, Moe Reilly and I have food and beverages together to discuss Dondi's future plights. We enjoy these bacchanalian revels very much because the Syndicate pays for them.

In 1961, Edson scripted the Dondi film adaptation, and he also wrote a proposed sequel, The Carnival Kid.

Edson was a member of the Society of Illustrators, the National Cartoonists Society and the Writers Guild of America.

== Books ==
Edson's strips were collected in several books, including Andy Gump in Radioland (1937) and The Gumps (1952). Whitman Publishing collected his Streaky strips in the 158-page book, Streaky and the Football Signals.

== Awards ==
In addition to his savings bond drives, Edson volunteered for various causes and fundraising campaigns. The Treasury Department recognized his efforts by awarding him a Distinguished Service Award in 1954.

During the 1940s, Edson lived on Brookside Road in Darien, Connecticut. He later moved to 149 Weed Avenue in Stamford, Connecticut, home to several cartoonists, including Ernie Bushmiller, Alex Raymond and Mort Walker. In Stamford, Edson helped raise money for community groups.

He died of heart failure September 27, 1966 in Stamford.

== Gus Edson Park ==
Gus Edson Park is located between Weed Avenue and Holly Pond in Stamford, Connecticut. In recent years, Sharon Slocum and the Cove Neighborhood Association launched a beautification and refurbishing of this park. Edson was honored by a plaque in the park, a reminder of his close ties with the group of poker pals in the Stamford Police department. The plaque reads:

Gus Edson Lookout dedicated to "friend of the cop" Stamford Police Assn.

Etched into the surface of the plaque is a portrait of Edson with Dondi and Andy Gump. In 1997, Edson's home at 149 Weed Ave. was torn down to make space for a small housing development.

Edson's son is the poet-novelist Russell Edson.
