= Poley McClintock =

American jazz singer

James Roland "Poley" McClintock (September 22, 1900, Tyrone, Pennsylvania — January 6, 1980, East Stroudsburg, Pennsylvania) was a member of Fred Waring's Pennsylvanians, a popular jazz band of the 1920s.

As a child, McClintock was a neighbor of Waring in Tyrone, Pennsylvania. The two performed together in the Boy Scout Fife and Bugle Corps, with Waring as drum major and McClintock as drummer. In 1915, he and Waring's brother, Tom, formed a banjo group, The Waring-McClintock Snap Orchestra.

His characteristic vocal inflections are heard frequently in many of the Pennsylvanians' novelty tunes, singing his parts in a low-range frog-like croak. It is widely believed that the part sung by Tony Burrows in The Pipkins' 1970 novelty record "Gimme Dat Ding" was intended as a tribute to McClintock.

McClintock was married to silent film actress Yvette Mitchell.
