= Old Doc Yak =

American comic strip by Sidney Smith

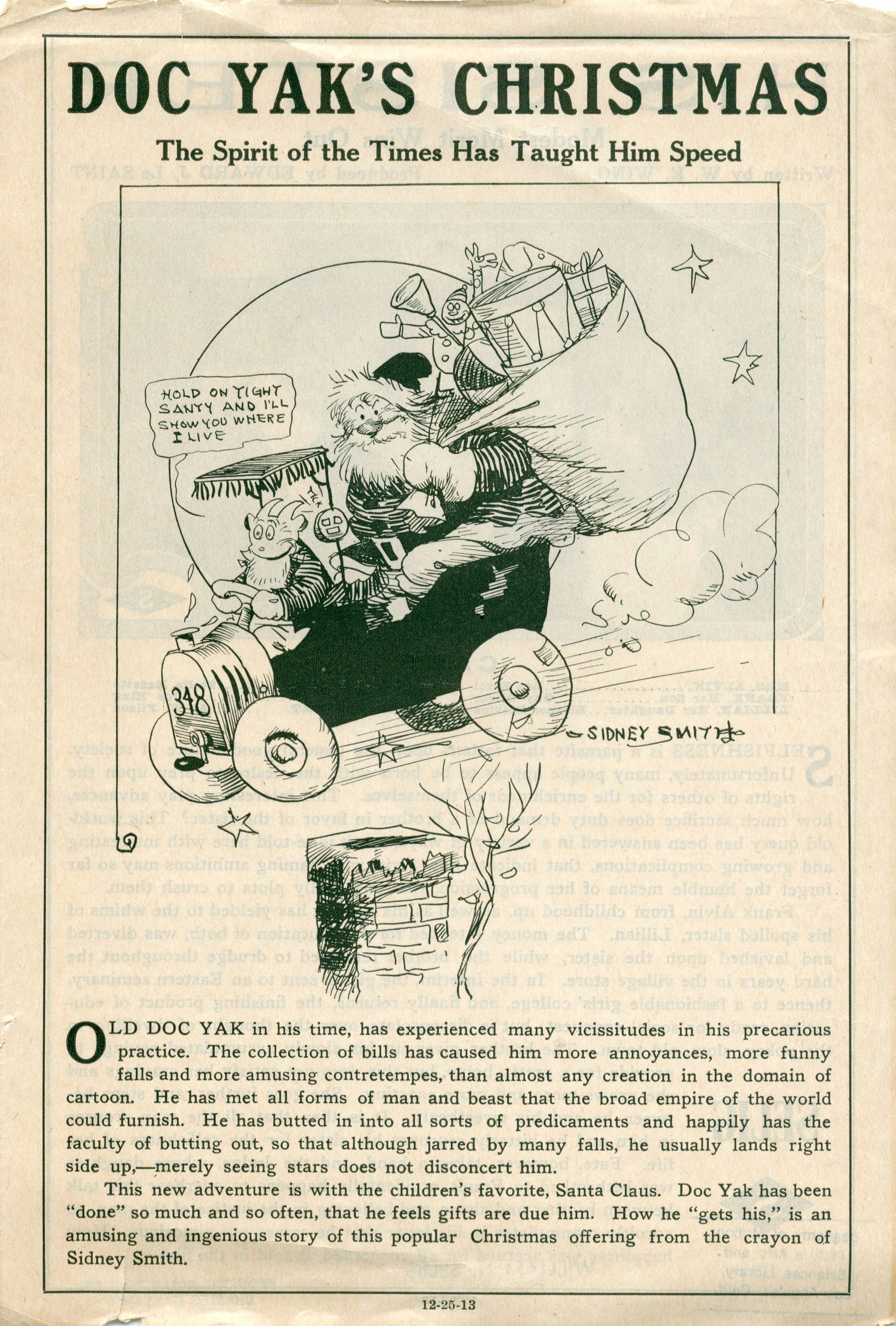
- Release flier for the 1913 short feature Doc Yak's Christmas
- Author: Sidney Smith
- Current status/schedule: Concluded; daily & Sunday
- Launch date: February 19, 1912
- End date: June 15, 1919
- Syndicate(s): Chicago Tribune Syndicate
- Genre: Comedy

Old Doc Yak is a comic strip by Sidney Smith that centers on a talking goat. The origin of the character was Buck Nix, a goat Smith drew in 1908 for the Chicago Evening Journal. For three years, Nix romanced a she-goat called Nanny.

In 1911, Smith moved to the Chicago Tribune. He introduced a new goat character when Old Doc Yak began as a daily strip on February 19, 1912, with the Sunday page starting a few weeks later on March 3.

Doc Yak was a family man and more mature than Buck Nix. He had a son, Yutch, along with a number of domestic problems. The last daily Old Doc Yak strip, on February 10, 1917, depicted Yak and his family moving out while wondering who might move into the house next. The last panel showed the empty house. The next day's newspapers, in the space formerly occupied by Old Doc Yak, printed the first strip of Smith's The Gumps, showing the Gumps moving into the house formerly occupied by the Yak family.

Old Doc Yak continued as a Sunday strip until June 15, 1919, when Yak was depicted selling his car to Andy Gump so he and Yutch could move away "to start life all over again". The Gumps likewise took over the Sunday space the following week.

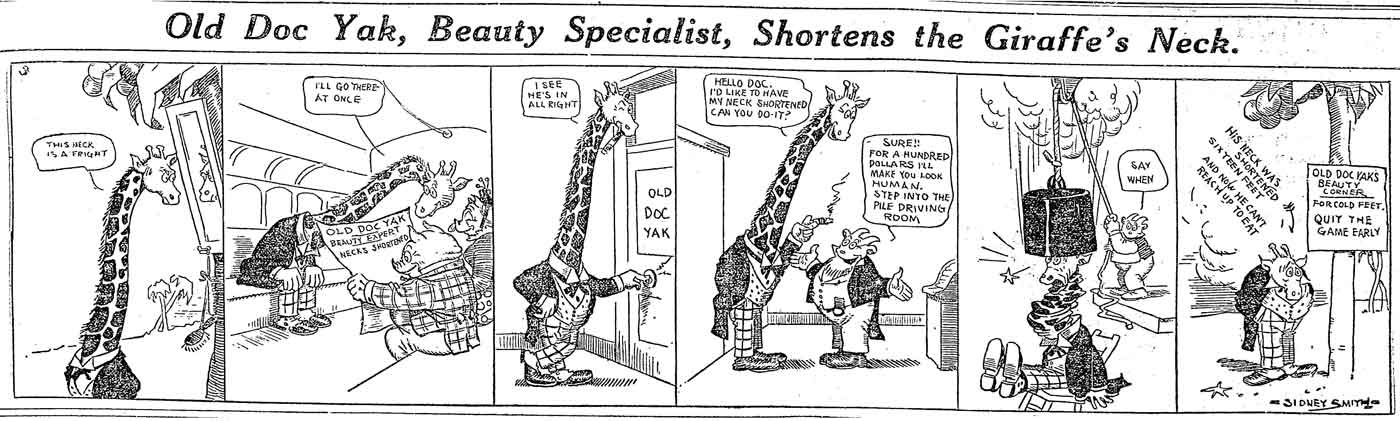
Old Doc Yak (February 15, 1912)

== Later appearances ==
On December 7, 1930, Old Doc Yak was revived as a topper for The Gumps Sunday page, continuing in that capacity until February 25, 1934.

In 1998, Old Doc Yak and Yutch appeared in Valiant Varmints, a one-shot comic book from Shanda Fantasy Arts. A masked figure called 'Bullethead' arranges for the anthropomorphic superheroes of the title, including Fission Chicken, to be distracted battling threats while he goes after a mysterious item; he turns out to be Doc Yak, who just wants his old license plate back (after losing it decades ago to the Gumps). Upon learning this, the Valiant Varmints decide to leave Yak and Yutch in peace.

== In other media ==
In 1913 and 1914, Doc Yak appeared in a series of animated shorts produced by the Selig Polyscope Company. The company further collaborated with the Tribune in the production of The Adventures of Kathlyn.
