= Sleep (1923 song) =

Single by Fred Waring's Pennsylvanians
- B-side: "The West, a Nest, and You"
- Released: November 30, 1923
- Recorded: October 16, 1923
- Genre: Jazz
- Length: 3:04
- Label: Victor
- Songwriters: Earl Burtnett, Adam Geibel, Tom Waring

"Sleep" is a song written by Earl Burtnett and Adam Geibel (under the pseudonym Earl Lebieg) in 1923. The song's melody is based on a motif from "Visions of Sleep", a 1903 composition by Geibel. The song was released by Fred Waring's Pennsylvanians in 1923, becoming the band's first hit and their signature theme. The song was also the theme for the television musical variety show The Fred Waring Show. The lyrics for the song were written by Waring's brother, Tom, who sang on the recording as well.

== Other charting versions ==
- Les Paul released a version of the song as the B-side to his and Mary Ford's 1953 single "I'm Sitting on Top of the World". It reached #21 on the U.S. pop chart and #31 on Cashbox chart.
- Little Willie John released a version of the song as a single in 1960 which reached #10 on the U.S. R&B chart and #13 on the U.S. pop chart.

== Other versions ==
- Tommy Dorsey and His Orchestra released a version of the song as the B-side to their 1937 single "Wake Up and Live".
- Alto saxophonist Earl Bostic released a version of the song as a single on King Records (#4444) in 1951.
- Urbie Green and His Big Band released a version of the song on their 1955 album All About Urbie Green and His Big Band.
- The Chico Hamilton Quintet released a version of the song on their 1956 album Chico Hamilton Quintet in Hi Fi.
- Billy Vaughn with His Orchestra released a version of the song as the a single in 1956, but it did not chart.
- Buddy Rich and Max Roach released a version of the song on their 1959 album Rich Versus Roach.
- Boots Randolph released a version of the song on his 1960 album Boots Randolph's Yakety Sax.
- Lawrence Welk and His Orchestra released a version of the song on their 1960 album Last Date.
- Chet Atkins released a version of the song on his 1961 album Chet Atkins' Workshop.
- Pat Boone released a version of the song on his 1961 album Moody River.
- Merle Travis released a version of the song on his 1981 album Travis Pickin'.
- Benny Goodman released a version of the song on his 1992 compilation album Florida Sessions.
- The Glenn Miller Orchestra released a version of the song on their 1998 compilation album The Chesterfield Shows 1940-1941 Yesterthoughts.
