= Russell Edson =

American poet

- Born: Russell Edelstein; December 12, 1928; Manhattan, New York, US
- Died: April 29, 2014 (aged 85)
- Occupation: Poet, Novelist, Illustrator
- Parent: Gus Edson
- Writing career
- Period: 1951–2009
- Notable awards: Guggenheim Fellowship (1974); National Endowment for the Arts Creative Writing Fellowship (1977, 1981, 1992); Whiting Award (1989)

Russell Edson (né Edelstein; 12 December 1928 – April 29, 2014) was an American poet, novelist, writer, and illustrator. He was the son of the cartoonist-screenwriter Gus Edson and Gladys Cedar Edson.

Born in Manhattan, New York City, Edson studied art early in life and attended the Art Students League as a teenager. He began publishing poetry in the 1950s. His honors as a poet include a Guggenheim fellowship, a Whiting Award, and several fellowships from the National Endowment for the Arts.

Edson self-published several chapbooks and later, numerous collections of prose poetry, fables, two novels, Gulping's Recital and The Song of Percival Peacock, and a book of plays under the title, The Falling Sickness. His final book was See Jack (University of Pittsburgh Press, 2009).

He lived in Darien, Connecticut with his wife Frances.

== Selected bibliography ==
=== Prose poems collections ===
- See Jack (University of Pittsburgh Press, 2009)
- The Rooster's Wife: Poems (BOA Editions, Ltd., 2005)
- The Tormented Mirror (University of Pittsburgh Press, 2001)
- The Tunnel: Selected Poems of Russell Edson (Oberlin College Press, 1994)
- The Wounded Breakfast (Wesleyan University Press, 1985)
- With Sincerest Regrets (Burning Deck Press, 1980)
- The Reason Why the Closet-Man Is Never Sad (Wesleyan University Press, 1977)
- Edson's Mentality (OINK! Press, 1977)
- The Intuitive Journey and Other Works (Harper & Row, 1976)
- The Clam Theater (Wesleyan University Press, 1973)
- The Childhood Of An Equestrian (Harper & Row, 1973)
- Ceremonies in Bachelor Space (Grapnel Press, Black Mountain College, 1951)

=== Chapbooks ===
- Wuck Wuck Wuck! (with linocut by Richard Mock, Red Ozier Press, 1984)

=== Novels ===
- Gulping's Recital (Guignol Books, 1984)
- The Song of Percival Peacock: A Novel (Coffee House Press, 1992)

=== Short fiction and fables ===
- Tick Tock: Short Stories (illustrated with woodcuts, Demitasse/Coffee House Press, 1992)
- What a Man Can See: Fables (with drawings by Ray Johnson, 1969)
- The Brain Kitchen: Writings and Woodcuts (Thing Press, 1965)
- The Very Thing That Happens: Fables and Drawings (New Directions Publishing, 1964)
- Appearances: Fables and Drawings (Thing Press, 1961)
- A Stone Is Nobody's: Fables and Drawings (Thing Press, 1961)

=== Plays ===
- The Falling Sickness: A Book of Plays (New Directions Publishing, 1975)

=== Music ===
- Ketchup opera in 2 acts. Text By Russell Edson, music by Franklin Stover. Scored for 2 voices & chamber orchestra.
- The Song of Percival Peacock - an entertainment for reed quintet and narrator set to prose poems of Russell Edson, by Franklin Stover. (Edition Hohenstaufen, 2017)

== Honors and awards ==
- 1992 National Endowment for the Arts Creative Writing Fellowship
- 1989 Whiting Award
- 1981 National Endowment for the Arts Creative Writing Fellowship
- 1976 National Endowment for the Arts Creative Writing Fellowship
- 1974 Guggenheim Fellowship
