= Joe Murphy (actor) =

US comic stage and film actor (1877–1961)

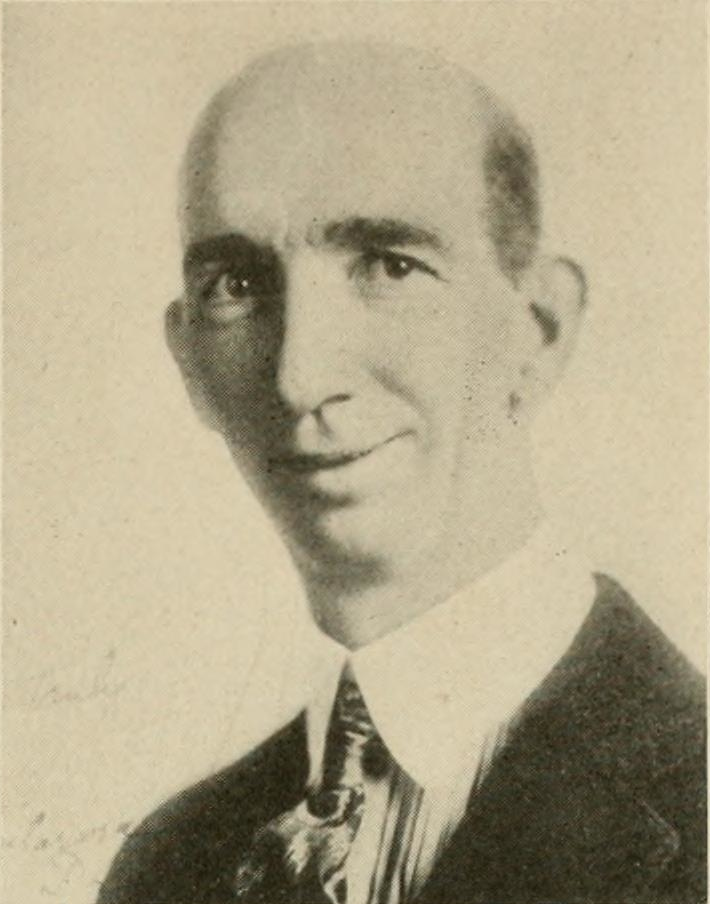
- Born: May 16, 1877; San Jose, California
- Died: July 31, 1961 (aged 84); Santa Clara, California
- Occupation: Stage actor

Joseph Murphy (May 16, 1877 – July 31, 1961) was an American comic stage actor. He went on to become a silent film actor, notably playing Andy Gump in the shorts The Gumps during the mid-1920s. His unusual tall, thin stature and extraordinary facial features were instantly recognizable.

== Personal life ==
Joe Murphy was born Joseph J. Murphy on 16 May 1877 in San Jose, California. His mother Anna (Mahoney) and father John Murphy were married in Michigan, January 13, 1875 before moving to San Jose, California. On October 30 ,1920, his son Russell, aged 16, was shot and killed by a police officer after he and his friends were mistaken for robbers. Murphy filed a $18,000 lawsuit against a patrolman of the L.A. Police Department, after criminal charges against the police were dropped by the district attorney claiming that the officer killed the boy in the line of duty. Joe continued to live in California where he worked as a silent moving picture star in Hollywood. He died at the age of 84 on 31 July 1961 in Santa Clara, leaving his wife, Marie, who was of Irish birth.

== Professional life ==
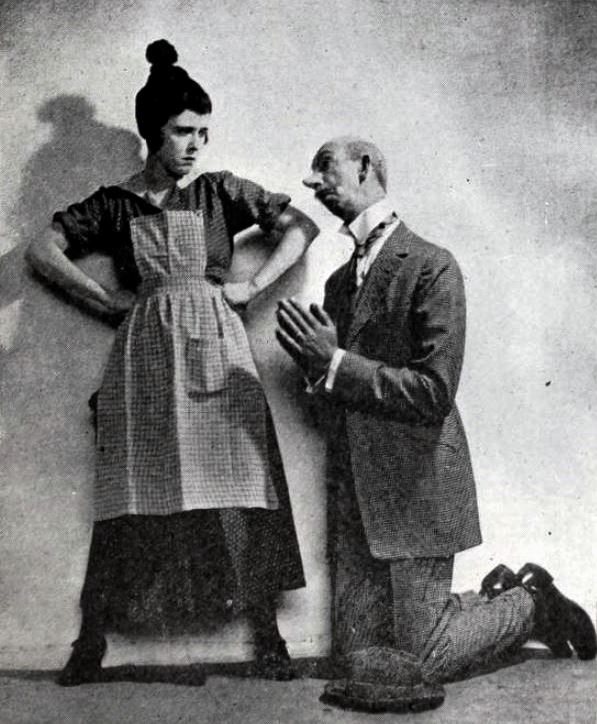
Murphy and Fay Tincher as Andy and Min Gump

Murphy began his career in Vaudeville. He was half of a Mutt and Jeff act alongside Little Bobby Vernon and he was also one the original Keystone Cops. From the 1910s through the 1940s Joe worked in many comedy short films, playing for most of the major studios, including Fox, National and L-Ko. His biggest success came during the five years (1923–1928) in which he played the very popular main character Andy Gump in Universal Pictures silent film shorts. The Gumps was a silent short where the misadventures of its main character, Andy Gump, a pompous bungler whose cry of "Oh! Min!" when he was in trouble became a 1920s catchphrase. Murphy's unusual and distinctive physical appearance (he was 6'3" tall and lanky), as well as being a naturally gifted slapstick comedian, made him ideally suited to playing the role (aided by an artificial nose). The Gumps elevated him to a relatively short period of stardom. He was described as "one of the best known comedy actors of the screen, and loved by thousands of moving picture fans". At the height of his popularity Murphy, as Andy Gump, would draw large crowds at promotional events.

The Gumps shorts were based on the extremely popular newspaper comic strip, written and drawn by Sidney Smith. The Gumps was first published on February 12, 1917. The popularity of the comic strip eventually led to the making of nearly 50 silent film shorts, produced by Samuel Von Ronken and released by Universal Studios. Many of "The Gumps" silent shorts were directed by Norman Taurog, with Joe Murphy as Andy Gump, Fay Tincher as Min (Minerva), Jack Morgan as Chester, and Slim Hamilton as Uncle Bim.

Carl Laemmle, owner of Universal Pictures at the time, recognized Joe Murphy's physical suitability for playing the Andy Gump character. Carl knew Joe was an ex-vaudevillian who had experience with L-KO, Keystone, FOX, Triangle, Reelcraft, and Educational Studios. The producers had thought it would be nearly impossible that they would find a character who could play the comic strip character until Laemmle recommended Joe. The Gumps series is now part of the National Film preservation effort.

After 1930 Murphy continued to appear in films, but he never again achieved the success that he reached with The Gumps, returning to working as an extra. This continued up to the 1940s, notably with the Three Stooges in You Nazty Spy! (1940). Murphy's career is slowly being rediscovered after a period of neglect, most notably through the work of the National Film Preservation Foundation.

== Filmography - The Gumps ==
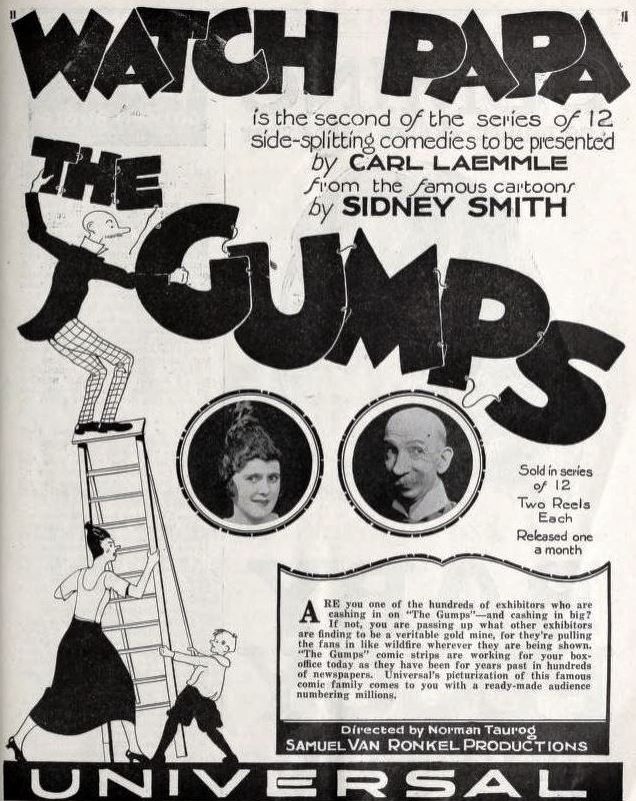
Poster for 'Watch Papa' (1923)

- Out in the Rain (Short) 1928 Andy Gump
- The Cloud Buster (Short) 1928 Andy Gump
- Any Old Count (Short) 1928 Andy Gump
- A Case of Scotch (Short) 1928 Andy Gump
- The Mild West (Short) 1927 Andy Gump
- Andy Nose his Onions (Short) 1927 Andy Gump
- A Total Loss (Short) 1927 Andy Gump
- Ocean Bruises (Short) 1927 Andy Gump
- And How! (Short) 1927 Andy Gump
- When Greek Meets Greek (Short) 1927 Andy Gump
- A Battle Scared Hero (Short) 1927 Andy Gump
- Too Much Sleep (Short) 1927 Andy Gump
- All Wet (Short) 1927 Andy Gump
- Circus Daze (Short) 1927 Andy Gump
- I'm the Sheriff (Short) 1927 Andy Gump
- Broke Again (Short) 1927 Andy Gump
- Youth and Beauty (Short) 1927 Andy Gump
- Up Against It (Short) 1927 Andy Gump
- Rooms for Rent (Short) 1927 Andy Gump
- I Told You So (Short) 1926 Andy Gump
- A Close Call (Short) 1926 Andy Gump
- The Big Surprise (Short) 1926 Andy Gump
- Better Luck (Short) 1926 Andy Gump
- Lots of Grief (Short) 1926 Andy Gump
- Never Again' (Short) 1926 Andy Gump
- Tow Service' (Short) 1926 Andy Gump
- Dumb Luck (Short) 1926 Andy Gump
- Min's Away (Short) 1926 Andy Gump
- Shady Rest (Short) 1926 Andy Gump
- California Here We Come (Short) 1926 Andy Gump
- Min Walks in Her Sleep (Short) 1926 Andy Gump
- Min's Home on the Cliff (Short) 1926 Andy Gump
- The Smash Up (Short) 1925 Andy Gump
- Andy takes a Flyer (Short) 1925 Andy Gump
- Dynamited (Short) 1925 Andy Gump
- Chester's Donkey Party (Short) 1925 Andy Gump
- Andy's Lion Tale (Short) 1925 Andy Gump
- Andy in Hollywood (Short) 1925 Andy Gump
- Andy's Stump Speech (Short) 1924 Andy Gump
- Andy's Hat in the Ring (Short) 1924 Andy Gump
- Westbound (Short) 1924 Andy Gump
- A Day of Rest (Short) 1924 Andy Gump
- Andy's Temptation (Short) 1924 Andy Gump
- What's the Use (Short) 1924 Andy Gump
- Oh! Min! (Short) 1924 Andy Gump
- Aggravatin' Mama (Short) 1923 Andy Gump
- Oh! What a Day!' (Short) 1923 National Film Preservation Andy Gump
- Watch Papa (Short) 1923 Andy Gump
- Uncle Bim's Gifts (Short) 1923 Andy Gump

== Filmography - Other ==
- You Nazty Spy! (Short) 1940 Peasant (uncredited)
- Mooching Through Georgia (Short) 1939 Tall Union Soldier (uncredited)
- When G-Men Step In 1938 Phone Man (uncredited)
- The Man Who Laughs 1928 Hardquanones Messenger (uncredited)
- Benson at Calford 1927 Man in Crowd (uncredited)
- The Cat and the Canary 1927 The Milkman (uncredited)
- The Red Lily 1924 Wagon Driver (uncredited)
- Open All Night 1924 Bicycle Race Spectator (uncredited)
- Souls For Sale 1923 Motorist (uncredited)
- Shadows 1922 Townsman at Engagement (uncredited)
- Please Be Careful (Short) 1922
- The Playhouse 1921 One of the Zouaves (uncredited)
- Skirts 1921
- Dynamite (Short) 1920
- Trouble (Short) 1920
- Nurse Marjorie 1920 Cook (uncredited)
- The Heart Snatcher (Short) 1920 Bass Fiddle Player
- A Little Princess 1917 Leader of Forty Bandits (uncredited)
- Her Candy Kid (Short) 1917 Joe "Mutt" Murphy
- Her Fame and Shame (Short) 1917 Audience Spectator (uncredited)
- When Hearts Collide (Short) 1917
- Heart Strategy' (Short) 1917
- Cold Hearts and Hot Flames (Short) 1916 Bald Man in Lobby
- The Mystery of the Leaping Fish (Short) 1916 Footman on vehicle (uncredited)
- Scars and Stripes Forever (Short) 1916
- Love Wires and Short Sparks (Short) 1916
