= Irwin Hasen =

American cartoonist (1918–2015)

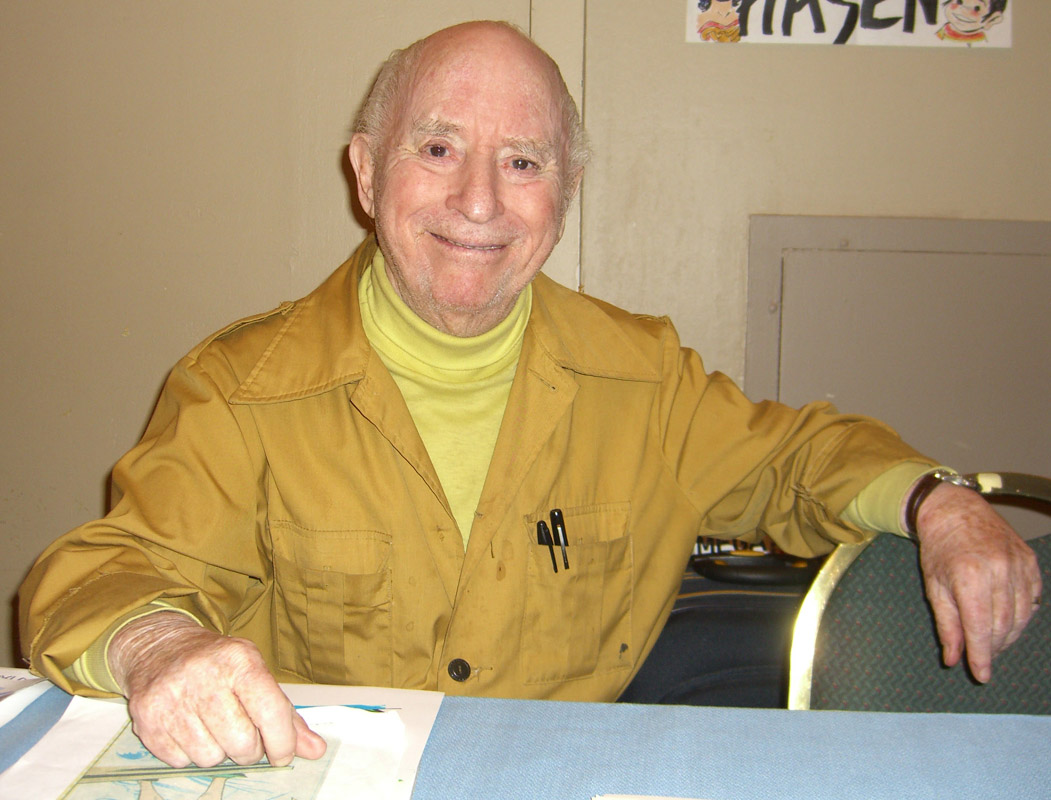
- Irwin Hasen at the Big Apple Summer Sizzler (June 13, 2009)
- Born: July 8, 1918 Manhattan, New York, U.S.
- Died: March 13, 2015 (aged 96) Manhattan, New York, U.S.
- Areas: Penciller, inker
- Notable works: Dondi, Green Lantern, Wildcat

Irwin Hasen (/ˈheɪzən/; July 8, 1918 – March 13, 2015) was an American cartoonist best known as the creator (with Gus Edson) of the Dondi comic strip. He also had a significant run on DC Comics' original Green Lantern, Alan Scott, in the 1940s as well as creating Wildcat (who became a superhero after seeing a Green Lantern comic book) for the same publisher.

== Early life ==
Irwin Hasen was born in Manhattan and raised in Brooklyn to a Jewish family. His family later moved from Brooklyn to 110th Street and Amsterdam Avenue in Manhattan. He attended DeWitt Clinton High School. In 1939, he began his art training on the block where he lived, as he recalled:

Across the street was the National Academy of Design, a huge structure like a garage, an airplane hangar. One of the oldest art schools in America, one of the most prestigious. Classical art. I was always drawing. I was drawing ... on the empty pages of books. So my mother, God bless her soul, took me across the street and enrolled me in a course of drawing ... I was there for three years, every night during the week, drawing in charcoal all the statues of Michelangelo and all the Bernini and all the classics ... During the day, I would hawk, sell, drawings of prizefighters down in New York. That was my first job—boxing cartoonist. I made a very small, very slight living. I was 19-20 years old. I sold my cartoons to the Madison Square Garden Corporation. They were printed all over New York in different newspapers. It was like public relations for the fights.

== Career ==
Irwin Hasen and Gus Edson's Dondi (April 15, 1962)

=== Comic books ===
After study at National Academy of Design, Hasen went to the Art Students League and then entered the comic book field in 1940 with the Harry "A" Chesler shop, contributing to The Green Hornet, The Fox, Secret Agent Z-2, Bob Preston, Explorer, Cat-Man and The Flash. At this time, he created the feature Citizen Smith, Son of the Unknown Soldier. In 1941, he worked for Sheldon Mayer. His art during the 1940s also included Green Lantern and the creation of the National Comics/DC Comics character Wildcat. He also did occasional art work for Wonder Woman in 1943, particularly Sensation Comics #19.

During World War II, Hasen was stationed at Fort Dix and managed the Fort Dix Post newspaper: "I edited it, I published it, I took it to the printers, I learned how to set up type, I did the comic strip, I wrote the whole goddam thing, and I interviewed all the celebrities coming in from New York. I worked my ass off, and I wound up in the hospital. But that was my proudest time, editing that newspaper for a year and a half."

He returned to DC after he was discharged from the Army in 1946. In the post-war period, he drew Johnny Thunder, the Justice Society of America, The Flash and Green Lantern.

=== Comic strips ===
Before the creation of Dondi in 1954, Hasen drew a comic strip adaptation of The Goldbergs radio/TV series which ran in the New York Post in 1944 and 1945.

Hasen, an active member of the National Cartoonists Society, met Gus Edson while on a tour of Korea and together they created the Dondi comic strip, with Edson writing and Hasen drawing.

=== Instruction ===
From September 1976 until May 2007 Irwin was an instructor at the Kubert School in Dover, New Jersey. He also taught cartooning classes at The School of Visual Arts in New York City.

== Personal life and death ==
Hasen suffered a minor stroke on April 24, 2007.

Hasen died March 13, 2015, at the age of 96.

== Awards ==
Hasen received the National Cartoonists Society's Story Comic Strip Award for Dondi in 1961 and 1962. He was awarded the Inkpot Award in 1999.
