= Dondi =

American comic strip

- Irwin Hasen and Gus Edson's Dondi (April 15, 1962)
- Author: Gus Edson (1955–1967); Bob Oksner (1967–1986)
- Illustrator: Irwin Hasen
- Launch date: September 25, 1955
- End date: June 8, 1986
- Syndicate(s): The Chicago Tribune-New York News

Dondi was a daily comic strip about a war orphan of the same name. Created by Gus Edson and Irwin Hasen, at its peak it appeared in more than 100 newspapers, and it ran for three decades (September 25, 1955, to June 8, 1986).

== Creation and publication history ==
Interviewed before a Comic-Con audience in San Diego, illustrator Hasen told TV-comics scripter Mark Evanier the origin of the strip during a trip to Korea:

I belonged to the National Cartoonists Society, and we had USO trips to Korea during the war. I went to the frontlines with six cartoonists ... And Gus Edson ... he and I got to be very close on the trip. One day, he asked me, "What are you doing?" Now usually, when you're not working, you say, "I'm in advertising." I wasn't doing any advertising. So then he said, "Well, would you be interested in anything?" I said yes. I would have done anything at that time. Finally, we got back to New York. Three days later, I get my mail and I'm sitting in my car going through it, and I come to an envelope: "Gus Edson." Inside is a little piece of stationery and a very crude drawing of Dondi — a little kid with a big, oversized hat ... big, oversized everything. And Gus writes, "Dear Kleine — ("Kleine" means "short" in German. He was making a cartoonist's half-assed joke ...) — "Dear Kleine — The kid should look like this." He had told me he had an idea for a strip about an orphan ... and I'll tell you something. I looked at that drawing, Mark, and it's like that old story that you're on a dance floor, and you look across a crowded room and you say, "That's the woman I'm gonna marry!" What inspired it was that during the Korean war, officers were adopting war orphans. That was where it was started. And then we just made it World War II, instead. Gus wrote it. He wrote it in longhand — no computer, no typewriter. He couldn't use a typewriter. He drank a lot.

After the death of Edson in 1966, Bob Oksner teamed with Hasen, whose first strip was dated April 23, 1967. Oksner and Hasen remained with the strip until its 1986 conclusion. When the strip ended, it was carried in only 35 newspapers.

== Characters and story ==
Dondi's original backstory describes him as a five-year-old World War II orphan of Italian descent. The boy had no memory of his parents or his name, so when a pretty Red Cross worker said he was "a dandy boy," he thought she was naming him "Dondi." Two soldiers who spoke no Italian, Ted Wills and Whitey McGowan, found the child wandering through a war-torn village. The soldiers brought the child back to the United States and Ted eventually became his adoptive father.

Like other comic strip boys, such as Dennis in Dennis the Menace, Dondi's character never ages. This became problematic in later years, as Dondi's age made the origin story impossible. Eventually, references to his Italian origin ceased, and he was adopted by Ted and his wife, the former Katje Bogar. "Pop" Fligh, a former pro baseball player, became Dondi's adoptive grandfather when he married Ted Wills' widowed mother. Following this, Dondi was portrayed simply as an adopted child, although in the early 1960s there was a reference to his being an orphan of the Korean War. During the mid-1970s, there was a reference to his being from Vietnam.

A recurring character was Mrs. McGowan, who was the mother of Whitey McGowan. In a rather startling development for a comic strip at the time, Whitey and his new bride died in a car crash on their honeymoon, leaving Dondi to Mrs. McGowan, who had initially resented the boy but came to love him and accept him as her grandson. This explanation was permitted to fade into the mist as the strip grew farther away from World War II.

Dondi was considered by some to be repellently wholesome; a Mad Magazine special issue in 1965 included a calendar that celebrated April 9 as "'Kick 'Dondi' in the teeth day." The Garden City Telegram (Garden City, Kansas) put it on its calendar, either naïvely or as a joke.

== Films ==
Dondi was adapted into a family-oriented film with David Kory in the title role and David Janssen as his American G.I. buddy, Dealey. Singer Patti Page also starred as Liz, and cameo appearances were made by Edson, as a police captain, and Hasen, as a police sketch artist.

The movie (and especially Kory's performance) were negatively received by critics. Kory, the son of Rockette Diane Kory, had one minor TV role in 1963 and never made another film. Produced and directed by Albert Zugsmith, the film was released 26 March 1961. Dondi was listed in the 1978 book The Fifty Worst Films of All Time and The Golden Turkey Awards.

Zugsmith says Allied Artists made the film to show they could make movies for children. He says the studio "arbitrarily cut the wrong twenty minutes out of it."

A comic book adaptation of the movie was published as Four Color #1176 by Dell.

The comic strip is featured in a scene in Kenneth Anger's short film Scorpio Rising (1964), as well as Sweet Punkin, I Love You (1976).

== Awards ==
Hasen received the National Cartoonists Society's Award for Story Comic Strip for 1961 and 1962 for his work on the strip.
