= Fay Tincher =

American comedy actress (1884-1983)

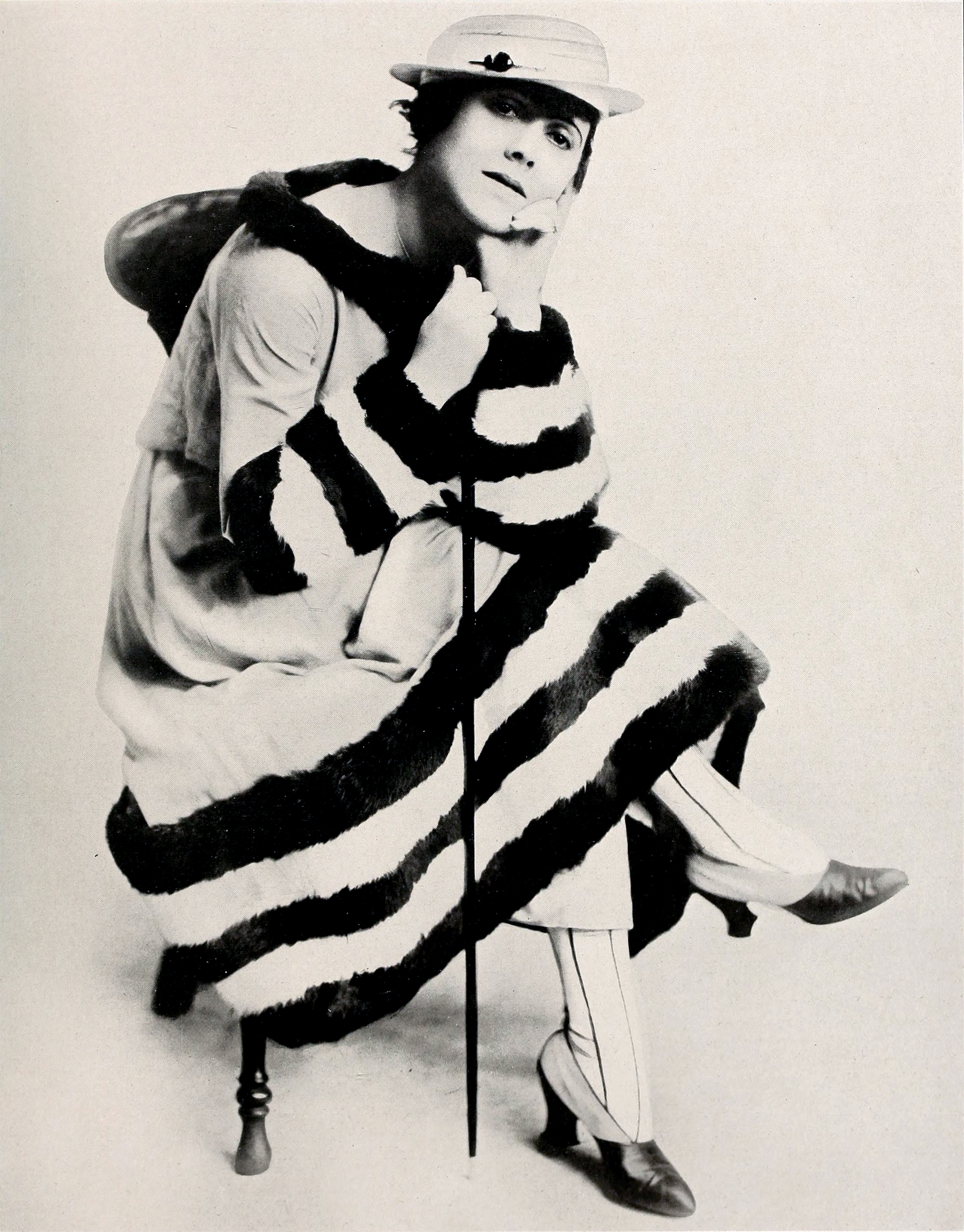
- The Photo-Play Journal, 1916
- Born: April 17, 1884; Topeka, Kansas, U.S.
- Died: October 11, 1983 (aged 99); Brooklyn, New York, U.S.
- Occupation: Actress
- Years active: 1908–1930
- Era: Silent era

Fay Tincher (April 17, 1884 – October 11, 1983) was an American comic actress in motion pictures of the silent film era.

== Early years ==
Tincher was born in Topeka, Kansas, and was the daughter of George Tincher and Elizabeth Tincher. She had three sisters, Mary, Ruth, and Julia. Her father was mayor of Topeka and the state printer. As a child, she studied dance, elocution, and music. During her teenage years, she went to a dramatic school in Chicago and participated in light opera performances.

== Early career ==
Although Tincher planned to perform in dramas, she ended up in comedy and later went into vaudeville, performing in Europe and in the United States.

Tincher began her career on stage. In 1908, she was touring in California with The Merry Go Round Company. In August of that year she may have married fellow actor, Ned Buckley, on a dare. He was a Yale graduate and a resident of Bridgeport, Connecticut. She visited her lawyer at the New York Life Insurance Building at 112-114 Broadway (Manhattan). She asked him to obtain a divorce if he learned that she was truly wed.

While performing on the Keith-Albee-Orpheum vaudeville circuit, Tincher was approached by a man who commented about her resemblance to actress Mabel Normand. She did not know Normand because she had never seen a movie in 1913. The agent gave her his card and said he wanted the director D.W. Griffith to see her. The following day she came calling at Biograph Studios. In her first role, Griffith cast her in the role of a vamp. Within three weeks she began to play comedy, at first slapstick, and later comedy drama.

== Films ==
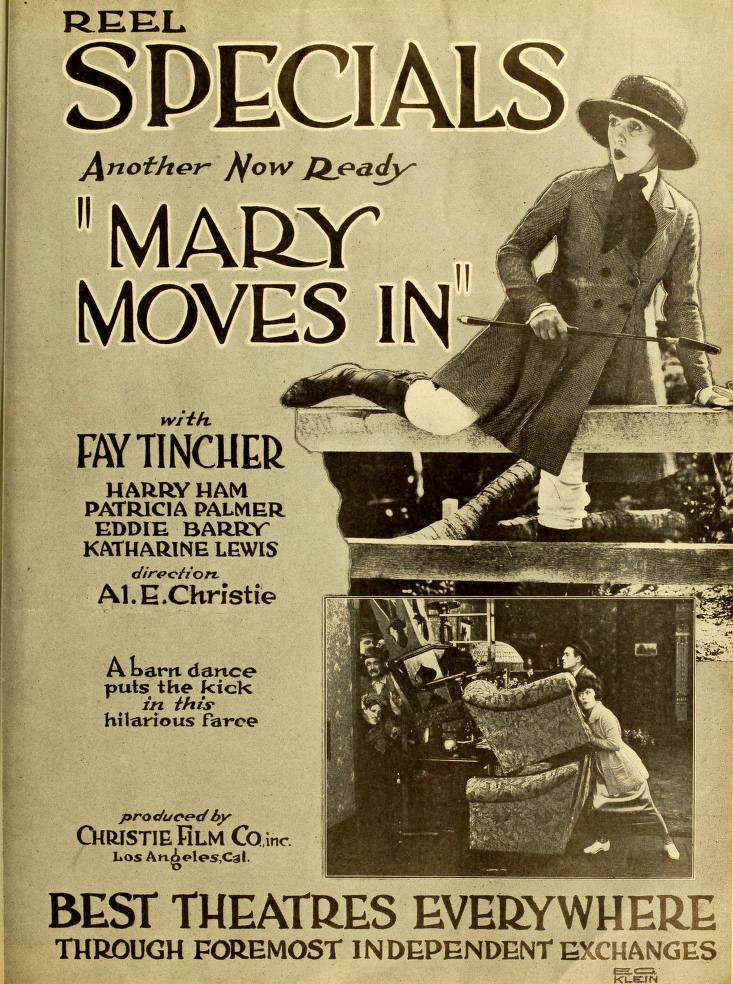
Advertisement (1919)

Tincher's film debut came in 1914. She played in Bill Manages A Fighter (1914), one of a series of Bill comedy shorts. It was made by the Komic Pictures Company of Los Angeles, California. The performers worked out of the Reliance Studios. Directed by Edward Dillon, former ex-lightweight fighter Hobo Dougherty was among the featured actors. In one scene Tincher encourages Dougherty to get knocked out on film. However, she has trouble convincing the fight veteran that he is not really in a pugilistic contest.

By the end of 1915, Tincher worked for the Fine Arts Film Company. Aside from comic roles, she often depicted working class types such as a laundry girl in Laundry Liz (1916). Dillon directed and Anita Loos was the scenarist. The short movie was released by the Keystone Film Company. In Skirts (1916) Tincher plays an artist's model who becomes a victim of drugs. This was a new type of role for her. Tully Marshall plays the artist.

Griffith staged a presentation of comic bull fights, massive floats, theatrical comedy, and drama in July 1915. The production was called the Pageant of the Photoplay. Audiences could view directors carrying megaphones, the process of film development, and movies being put together in make-up rooms. Tincher played a dramatic part in a comedy on the final day of the event. A stage was assembled and four scenes were acted out.

In 1918 Tincher became head of her own company, Fay Tincher Productions. Her movies were released by the World Film Company.

In the Andy Gump comedy series (1923–1928) Tincher played Min, who wears her hair bobbed, alongside Joe Murphy as her husband, Andy Gump. The series numbered around forty-five films and was produced by Universal Pictures and Samuel Von Honkel. American cartoonist Sidney Smith created the film characters.

Tincher's final motion picture was All Wet (1930). This is a two-reel comedy short directed by Sam Newfield.

== Inheritance ==
Tincher inherited $25,000 (equivalent to $455,976 in 2023) from the bequest of the will of Mrs. Julian Dick, who died from inhaling illuminating gas on December 22, 1930. Dick's residence was at 116 East 36th Street in New York City. Her husband, Captain Dick, was a member of the New York Cotton Exchange. He had been accidentally shot to death by a friend in 1922.

== Personal life and death ==
In May 1915, Tincher won a bathing suit contest at Venice Beach, California, winning a first prize of $50. She wore a costume that resembled her famous "typewriter dress", which she wore in movies. A crowd of approximately 75,000 attended the procession.

In 1918, she roomed with scenario writer, Maie B. Havey, in a small bungalow. Tincher liked working in the fine art of vitreous enamel.

On October 11, 1983, Fay Tincher died in Brooklyn, New York at the age of 99. She is buried in an unmarked grave at Silver Mount Cemetery on Staten Island.

== Partial filmography ==
- The Battle of the Sexes (1914)
- The Quicksands (1914)
- Home, Sweet Home (1914)
- Nell's Eugenic Wedding (1914)
- The Escape (1914)
- Sunshine Dad (1916)
- Rowdy Ann (1919)
- Excitement (1924)
- The Reckless Age (1924)

== Sources ==
- Nickelodeon. 1915.
- Slide, A.; Stevens, G. (2016). She Could Be Chaplin!: The Comedic Brilliance of Alice Howell. Hollywood Legends Series. University Press of Mississippi. ISBN 978-1-4968-0844-8.
- Doyle, B.H.; Slide, A. (1995). The Ultimate Directory of the Silent Screen Performers: A Necrology of Births and Deaths and Essays on 50 Lost Players. G - Reference, Information and Interdisciplinary Subjects Series. Scarecrow Press. ISBN 978-0-8108-2958-9.
