= Sidney Smith (cartoonist) =

American cartoonist (1877–1935)

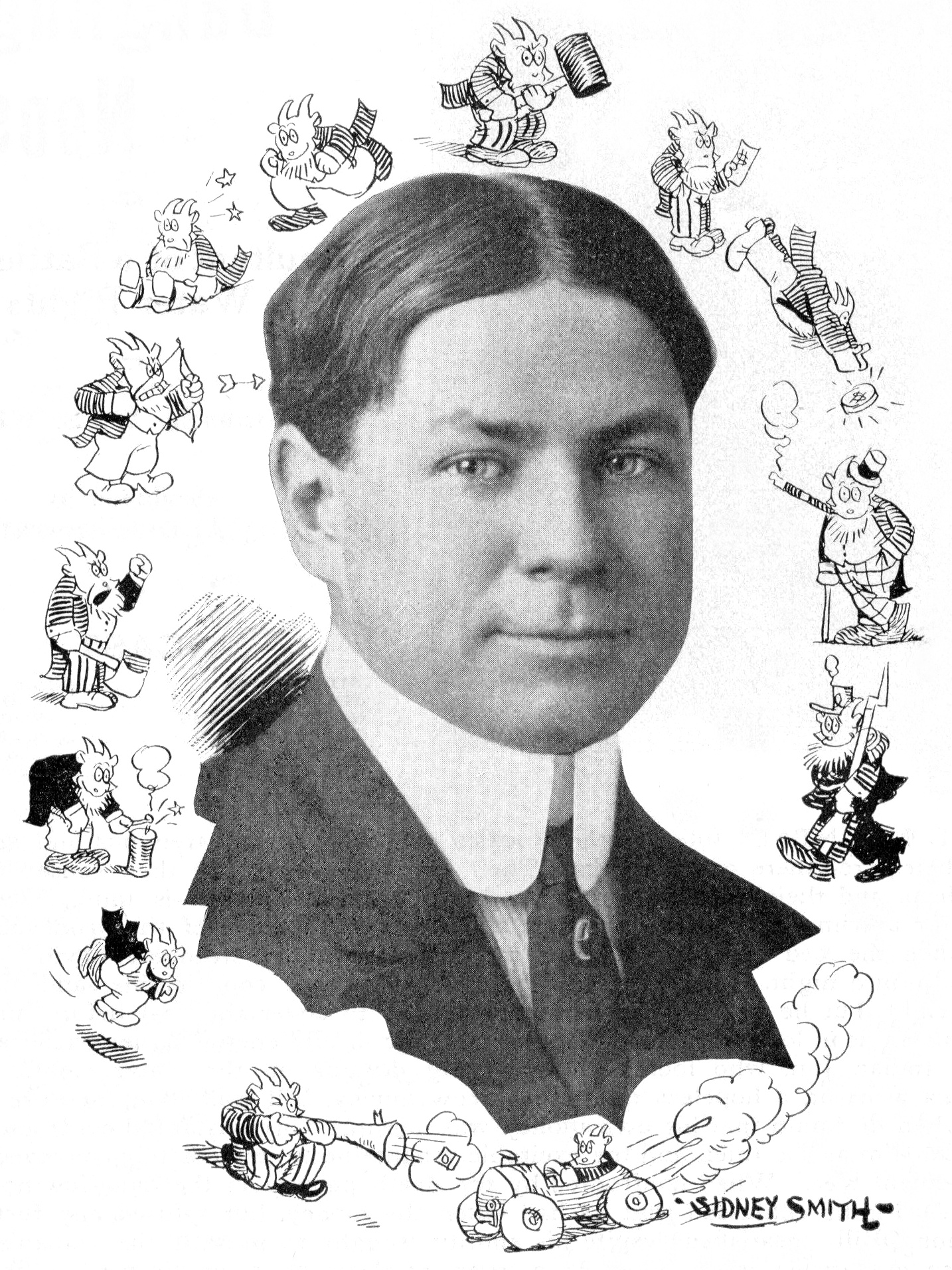
- Portrait circa 1912
- Born: Robert Sidney Smith; February 13, 1877 Bloomington, Illinois, U.S.
- Died: October 20, 1935 (aged 58) Chicago, Illinois, U.S.
- Notable works: The Gumps; Old Doc Yak
- Spouses: Gertrude Craddock (m. 1912; died 1924) Katheryn Abel Eulette (m. 1926)

Robert Sidney Smith (February 13, 1877 – October 20, 1935), known as Sidney Smith, was the creator of the influential comic strip The Gumps, based on an idea by Captain Joseph M. Patterson, editor and publisher of the Chicago Tribune.

== Biography ==
He was born in Bloomington, Illinois. The son of a dentist, Smith never finished high school and began drawing cartoons for his hometown newspaper when he was 18. He also delivered chalk talks and worked in newspaper art departments in Indiana, Pennsylvania and Ohio.

In 1908, he signed on as a sports cartoonist at the Chicago Examiner where he created a talking goat in a feature, Buck Nix, which involved continuity: "What will tomorrow bring?" In 1911, Smith moved to the Chicago Tribune, where he introduced a new goat character when Old Doc Yak began as a daily on February 5, 1912, with the Sunday page starting a month later on March 10. In either 1912 or early 1913 he began creating "Old Doc Yak" animated films. Some sources show the first cartoon as appearing in 1912 whereas the Library of Congress lists 3 films in 1913, 13 in 1914 and 2 in 1915. This is the first animated series with a recurring character. It was distributed through Selig films, a major Chicago-based studio. No films seem to have survived, but a single printed background was in the files of Smith's final assistant Andy Hettinger.

At the Chicago Tribune on October 28, 1914, he started a panel, "Light Occupations", which ran alongside an untitled local sports-oriented feature. Expanding from sports into a variety of recurring strips, it initially appeared in various odd sizes, continuing until Saturday, January 20, 1917.

=== From goats to Gumps ===
Sidney Smith surrounded by letters received in 1929 after he killed The Gumps' Mary Gold, the first character to die in a continuity comic strip

The last Old Doc Yak ended February 10, 1917, with the well-dressed Yak and his family leaving their house, wondering who might next move into it. The last panel showed only the empty house. On February 12, 1917, in the space formerly occupied by Old Doc Yak, newspapers displayed the initial episodes of The Gumps, showing them moving into the same house.

The Gumps had a 42-year run in newspapers, continuing until October 17, 1959. The strip, its merchandising (toys, games, a popular song, playing cards, food products) and media adaptations made Smith a wealthy man. In addition to his townhouse, he had a large estate near Chicago and a 2,200-acre (8.9 km^{2}) farm. He believed in physical fitness, keeping in shape with amateur boxing and long-distance running. Smith's studio was in a large 12-room lakefront house at Lake Geneva, Wisconsin. Wearing a coonskin cap, Smith threw large parties at his estate, which also had a log cabin, a caretaker's home, a four-car garage and a statue of Andy Gump on the front lawn. The circular drive that led to the house surrounded a large illuminated fountain.

Sam Carr Polk wrote:

The Gumps episode with inventor "Tom Carr" and his lady love "Mary Gold" was inspired by Smith's friendship with my uncle, inventor E.G. "Ted" Carr and his beautiful red-head secretary, Mary Bridgeman. Uncle Ted manufactured road machinery of his own invention at 939 West North Avenue in Chicago, and Smith fell in love with his secretary—for a while. When they broke up, poor Mary Gold had an untimely death, which inspired the flood of letters he's lying among in the publicity photo.

Smith's strip was adapted into a live-action/animated film series in 1920–21 by Wallace Carlson, starring Joe Murphy (Andy) and Fay Tincher. During production, Carlson formed a partnership with Gumps writer Sol Hess, and together they launched The Nebbs, a Gumps-like family comic strip which began May 1923 and continued until 1946. Mary Gold's death in 1929—one of the earliest cartoon deaths—was a media sensation, attracting intense interest across the country.

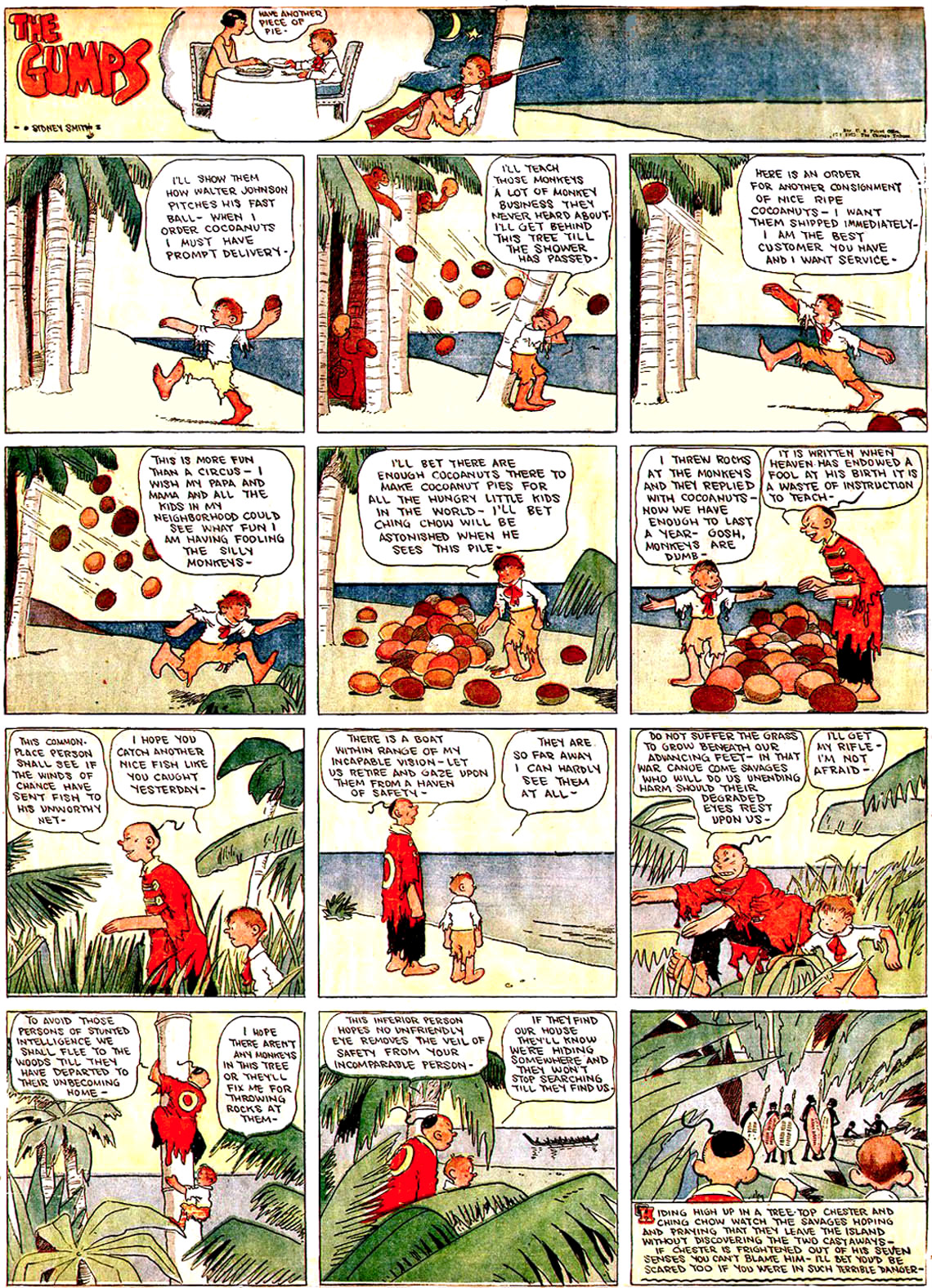
Sidney Smith's The Gumps (March 8, 1925)

In 1922, Smith signed a million-dollar contract ($100,000 per year for ten years). Two years later, he published the 183-page Andy Gump, His Life Story (1924). On October 20, 1935, he signed a new contract, giving him $150,000 a year. On his way home from signing that contract, he died in a head-on collision. He was 58 years old. It is often reported that Smith crashed a brand new Rolls-Royce that was given to him by The Chicago Tribune at this time. This is only a legend. Smith was given a Rolls-Royce Silver Ghost, chassis number 14MG, in 1922, not in 1935. The car in which Smith died was a "small sedan."

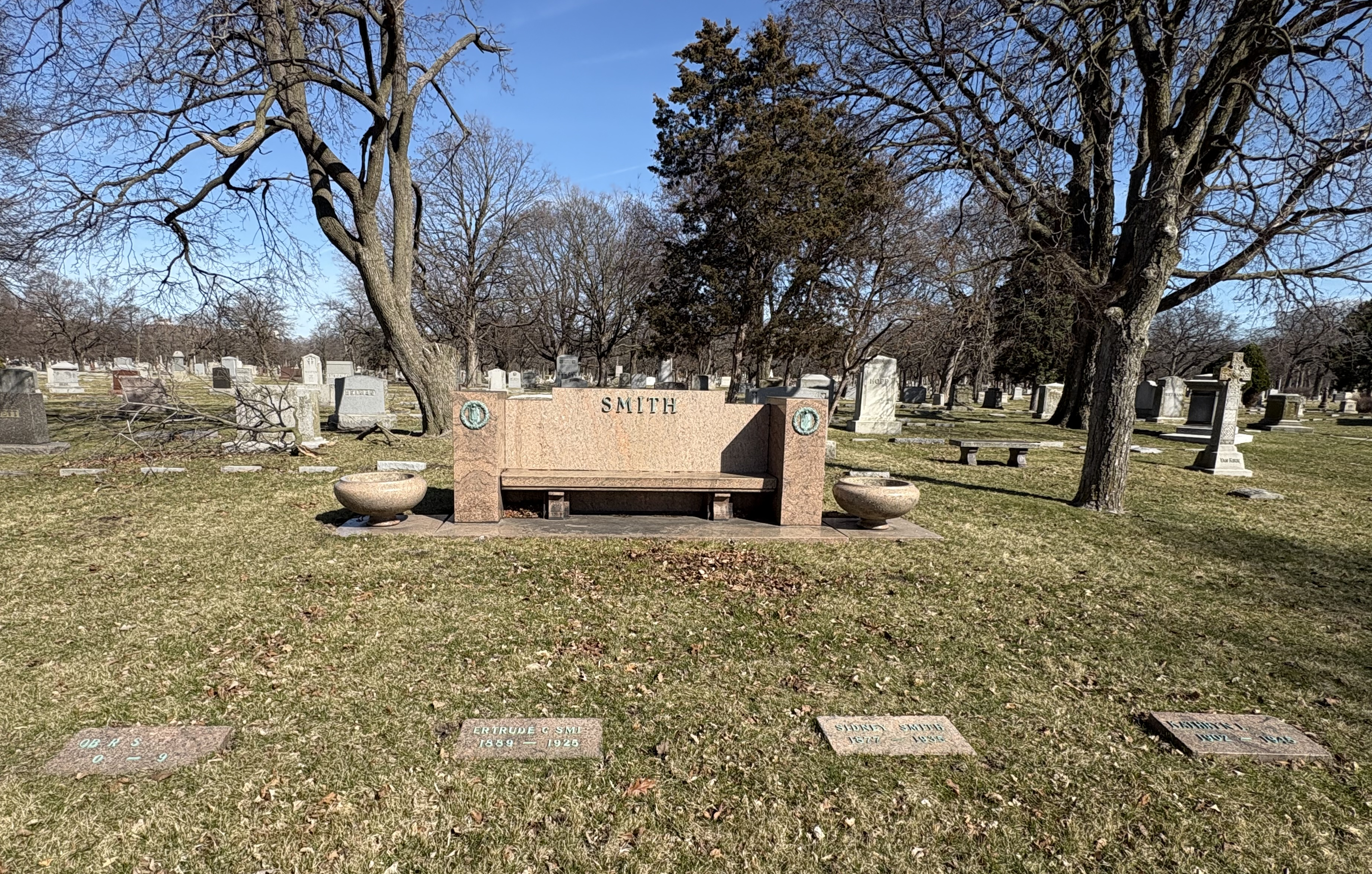
Smith's grave at Rosehill Cemetery

Smith was buried at Rosehill Cemetery.

== Influence ==
The Gumps inspired radio serial Sam 'n' Henry (and its successor Amos 'n' Andy) and thus had a huge influence on the introduction of radio serial continuity and radio-television situation comedies, as detailed by broadcast historian Elizabeth McLeod in the "Andy Gump to Andy Brown" section of her popular culture essay, "Amos 'n' Andy—In Person," and her book, The Original Amos 'n' Andy: Freeman Gosden, Charles Correll, and the 1928–43 Radio Serial. Mainly due to the research of McLeod, Sidney Smith is now regarded as a seminal figure in 20th-century popular culture.

== Books ==
- Herb Galewitz compiled daily strips for his book, Sidney Smith's The Gumps, published in 1974 by Charles Scribner's Sons.
- LOAC Essentials 2: The Gumps (2013)
