= Earl Burtnett =

American musician (1896-1936)

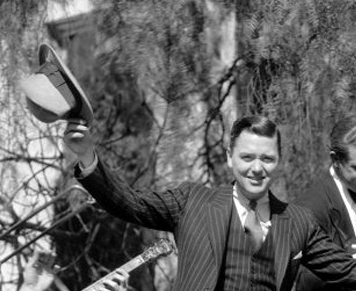
- c.1929

Background information
- Born: February 7, 1896; Harrisburg, Pennsylvania, U.S.
- Died: January 2, 1936 (aged 49) Chicago, Illinois, U.S.
- Genres: Jazz, big band
- Occupation: Musician
- Years active: 1915 – 1935

Earl Burtnett (February 7, 1896 – January 2, 1936) was an American bandleader, songwriter and pianist who was popular in the 1920s and 1930s.

== Life and career ==
Burtnett was born in Harrisburg, Pennsylvania. He attended Pennsylvania State College but left after two years. He began having songs published, including "Canadian Capers" (1915) and "Down Honolulu Way" (1916), and in 1918 joined Art Hickman's touring band. Shortly afterwards, promoter Florenz Ziegfeld heard the band in San Francisco, and featured them on Broadway in the Ziegfeld Follies of 1920.

After they moved back to California, Burtnett continued as lead arranger and writer for the Hickman orchestra, his successful songs including "Sleep", "Leave Me With A Smile" (1921), "Mandalay" (1924), and "If I Should Lose You" (1927). In 1929, he took over as band leader on Hickman's retirement. His band then had a residency at the Biltmore Hotel in Los Angeles, and recorded for Brunswick Records backing the Biltmore Trio. They also appeared in two films, The Flying Fool (1929) and The Party Girl (1930), billed as "Earl Burtnett and his Hotel Biltmore Orchestra and Trio". They played across the country in the early and mid 1930s, with periods at both the Rice Hotel in Houston (from 1933), and later at the Drake Hotel and other venues in Chicago, where their concerts were often broadcast on WGN radio.

Burtnett recorded for Columbia from 1926 through 1928 when he signed with Brunswick and recorded prolifically through mid-1931. There was a further session in Chicago in May, 1934 for Columbia. During that break, his band was apparently making transcriptions, but none have ever turned up.

== Death ==
On Christmas Eve, 1935, Burtnett underwent an appendectomy at Illinois Central Hospital in Chicago. However, peritonitis set in after the operation, and he died on January 2, 1936, at the age of 39.
