= Elizabeth McLeod =

Journalist and broadcast historian

- Born: 1963
- Occupation(s): Journalist; media historian of Old-time radio

Elizabeth McLeod (born 1963) is a journalist and broadcast historian who lives and works on the coast of Maine. She is best known for her extensive research into the origin and history of Amos 'n' Andy, an authoritative study first available on the Internet and then in her book, The Original Amos ’n’ Andy: Freeman Gosden, Charles Correll and the 1928–1943 Radio Serial.

== Biography ==
McLeod has written numerous articles on radio pioneers and the history of early radio. Her articles have appeared in such publications as Nostalgia Digest, Journal of the Radio Historical Association of Colorado and Radio Recall. She has contributed to (among others) Exploring Cultural History: Living Through the Great Depression and Encyclopedia of Radio. McLeod has also written liner notes for Radio Archives' Radio Legends: Matinee with Bob and Ray and other CD collections. Her major work, The Original Amos ’n’ Andy: Freeman Gosden, Charles Correll and the 1928–1943 Radio Serial was published in 2005 by McFarland. A biography of radio's first major stars that examines their long-term impact on the medium, the book refutes frequent condemnations of the radio and television series. Between 1997 and 2006 she contributed over 800 scripts to the daily CBS Radio Network program "Sound*Bytes."

== Awards ==
In recognition of her work, she received the 2005 Ray Stanich Award presented by the Friends of Old Time Radio. McLeod is also a three-time winner of awards from the Maine Association of Broadcasters: Best Continuing Coverage, Radio (1990), Best Radio Commercial (1993) and Best Radio Writing (1996).

== Selected bibliography ==
=== Books ===
- The Original Amos 'n Andy: Freeman Gosden, Charles Correll, and the 1928-1943 Radio Serial. McFarland & Co., 2005.
- Sterling, C. H., editor. McLeod articles in The Encyclopedia of Radio. Routledge Research Amalgamated Broadcasting System, 2004.
- Collins, Tracy Brown, editor. McLeod essay, "The Controversial Comedy of Amos 'n' Andy" in Exploring Cultural History: Living Through the Great Depression. Greenhaven Press, 2004.

=== Magazines ===
- "Radio Moments of the 20th Century," Journal of the Radio Historical Association of Colorado, January through December, 2000.
- "Documenting Early Radio," Radio Recall: Journal of the MWOTRC, December 1997 (Part One), February 1998 (Part Two), April 1998 (Part Three).
- Nostalgia Digest
  - "Tis Funny, McGee," December 2000-January 2001.
  - "We Want Cantor," October-November 2000.
  - "Forever Snooks," August-September 2000.
  - Tonight the Program's Gonna Be Different: Life and Times of Ed Wynn," June-July 2000.
  - "His Time Was Our Time: The Rudy Vallee Story," April-May 2000.
  - "Charlie's Big Night," February-March 1999.
  - "Forgotten Laughter: An Appreciation of Fred Allen," December 1998-January 1999.

== Listen to ==
- Interview with Elizabeth McLeod
