= United Media =

Defunct print syndication service

- Formerly: United Media Enterprises
- Company type: Print syndication
- Founded: 1978; 48 years ago, as the merger of United Features and NEA
- Defunct: 2011; 15 years ago
- Fate: Merged into Universal Uclick
- Headquarters: Chicago, Illinois, U.S.
- Services: editorial columns and comic strips
- Parent: E. W. Scripps Company
- Divisions: Newspaper Enterprise Association (est. 1902); United Feature Syndicate (est. 1919)

United Media was a large editorial column and comic strip newspaper syndication service based in the United States, owned by the E. W. Scripps Company, that operated from 1978 to 2011. It syndicated 150 comics and editorial columns worldwide. Its core businesses were the United Feature Syndicate and the Newspaper Enterprise Association.

== History ==
E. W. Scripps started his newspaper career in the 1885, and owned 22 newspapers by 1910. In 1897, he created two companies, the Scripps-McRae Press Association and the Scripps News Association. In 1907, he combined a number of news providers into United Press Associations as a rival to Associated Press.

On June 2, 1902, the new Newspaper Enterprise Association (NEA), based in Cleveland, Ohio, started as a news report service for different Scripps-owned newspapers. It started selling content to non-Scripps owned newspapers in 1907, and by 1909, it became a more general syndicate, offering comics, pictures and features as well. At that time, it had some 100 features available.

United Feature Syndicate was formed in 1919. It became a dominant player in the syndication market in the early 1930s. In March 1930, United Features acquired the Metropolitan Newspaper Service (ostensibly from the Bell Syndicate). And in late February 1931, Scripps acquired the New York World, which controlled the syndication arms of the Pulitzer company: World Feature Service and Press Publishing Co. (which unlike other syndicates were owned by the paper rather than being separate entities). An April 1933 article in Fortune described United Feature as one of the "Big Four" American syndicates (along with King Features Syndicate, Chicago Tribune Syndicate, and the Bell Syndicate). United Features and NEA both became successful distributors of newspaper comics in the 1930s.

In 1972, United Features Syndicate acquired and absorbed the North American Newspaper Alliance and the Bell-McClure Syndicate into its operations.

In May 1978, Scripps merged United Features and NEA to form United Media Enterprises (UM).

In 1992, United Media donated the Robert Roy Metz Collection of 83,034 original cartoons by 113 cartoonists to the Billy Ireland Cartoon Library & Museum.

In 1994, Jim Davis's company, Paws, Inc., purchased the rights to Garfield (including the strips from 1978 to 1993) from United Feature. The strip is currently distributed by Universal Press Syndicate, while rights for the strip remain with Paws.

On June 3, 2010, United Media sold their licensing arm, along with the rights to Peanuts and Dilbert, to Iconix Brand Group.

The Scripps Howard News Service (SHNS) (established 1917) was part of United Media; SHNS went defunct in 2013.

On February 24, 2011, United Media struck a distribution deal with Universal Uclick (now known as Andrews McMeel Syndication) for syndication of the company's 150 comic strip and news features, which became effective on June 1 of that year. Of the more than 40 comic strips United Media transferred to Universal Uclick, about 75% of them were United Features strips (as opposed to Newspaper Enterprise Association strips). While United Media effectively ceased to exist, Scripps still maintains copyrights and intellectual property rights.

From 1999 until its 2011 takeover by Universal Uclick, United Media used the Comics.com domain to promote their existing syndicated strips as well as promote new strips and the burgeoning realm of webcomics. (Comics.com also featured editorial cartoons, The New Yorker cartoons, Snoopy.com, and Dilbert.com.) The site, however, never worked the way it was planned. As cartoonist and former UM editor of acquisitions and development Ted Rall wrote, Comics.com "was the laughingstock of the industry, full of Javascript gone wild, 404 errors and broken widgets." According to Rall, outgoing UM President Doug Stern told his employees "that part of the failure of UM was directly attributable to the company's inability to make money online, that they had tried their best but failed." Many involved with the company said that was not the case. Universal Uclick/Andrews McMeel Syndication took over the Comics.com domain, which currently redirects to GoComics.com, the web's largest catalog of syndicated newspaper strips, political cartoons and webcomics, offering free new content every day.

== Syndicated comic strips before June 1, 2011 ==
=== Newspaper Enterprise Association ===
- Alley Oop originally by V. T. Hamlin (launched 1932)
- Arlo and Janis by Jimmy Johnson (launched 1985)
- Big Nate by Lincoln Peirce (launched 1991)
- The Born Loser by Art Sansom (launched 1965)
- Drabble by Kevin Fagan(launched 1979)
- Frank and Ernest originally by Bob Thaves (launched 1972)
- The Grizzwells by Bill Schorr (launched 1987)
- Kit 'n' Carlyle by Larry Wright (1980–2015)
- Moderately Confused by Jeff Stahler (launched 2003)
- Shortcuts by Jeff Harris (launched August 30, 1999)
- Soup to Nutz by Rick Stromoski (2000–2018)

=== United Feature Syndicate ===
- 9 Chickweed Lane by Brooke McEldowney (launched 1993)
- Betty by Gary Delainey and Gerry Rasmussen (launched 1991)
- Brevity originally by Guy Endore-Kaiser and Rodd Perr (launched 2005)
- The Buckets originally by Scott Stantis (launched 1994) — picked up from Tribune Media Services
- Committed by Michael Fry (1994–2006)
- Cow and Boy by Mark Leiknes (2006–2012)
- Dilbert by Scott Adams (1989–2011)
- F Minus by Tony Carrillo (launched 2006)
- Family Tree by Signe Wilkinson (January 1, 2008 – August 27, 2011)
- Ferd'nand by Henning Dahl Mikkelsen (1937–2012)
- Frazz by Jef Mallett (launched 2001)
- Get Fuzzy by Darby Conley (launched 1999)
- Graffiti by Gene Mora (launched May 3, 2011)
- Grand Avenue originally by Mike Thompson (launched 1999)
- Health Capsules originally by Dr. Michael Petti and Jud Hurd; then by Bron Smith (launched 1961)
- Herman by Jim Unger (1975–1992, 1997–2012)
- Jane's World by Paige Braddock (entered syndication April 1, 2002)
- Jump Start by Robb Armstrong (launched 1989)
- KidCity by Steve McGarry (launched 2011) — now known as KidTown
- KidSpot by Dan Thompson (launched May 3, 2011)
- The Knight Life by Keith Knight (launched 2008)
- Lola by Todd Clark (launched 1999) — came over from Tribune Media Services
- Luann by Greg Evans (launched 1985) — came over from North America Syndicate
- Marmaduke originally by Brad Anderson (launched 1954) – came over from National Newspaper Syndicate in c. 1970
- Monty by Jim Meddick (launched 1985) — originally titled Robotman
- Nancy originally by Ernie Bushmiller (1938–2011)
- Off the Mark by Mark Parisi (launched 1987)
- Over the Hedge by Michael Fry & by T. Lewis (launched 1995)
- Peanuts by Charles M. Schulz (1950–2011)
- Pearls Before Swine by Stephan Pastis (launched 2001)
- Prickly City by Scott Stantis (launched 2004)
- Reality Check by Dave Whamond (launched 1995)
- Rip Haywire by Dan Thompson (launched 2009)
- Ripley's Believe It or Not! (launched 1918) — came over from King Features Syndicate
- Rose Is Rose by Pat Brady (launched 1984)
- Rudy Park by Theron Heir and Darrin Bell (2001–c. 2011; moved to Washington Post Writers Group where it concluded in 2018)
- Secret Asian Man by Tak Toyoshima (entered syndication July 16, 2007)
- Tarzan originally by Hal Foster (launched 1929)
- Uncle Art's Funland originally by Art Nugent (launched 1933) — came over from Bell-McClure Syndicate
- Working Daze written by John Zakour (launched 2001)
- World of Wonder by Laurie Triefeldt (launched 2000)

== Syndicated editorial cartoons ==
- Robert Ariail
- Matt Bors
- Bill Day
- Jerry Holbert
- Mike Lester
- Henry Payne
- Rob Rogers
- Bill Schorr
- Jeff Stahler
- Ed Stein

== Webcomics and web animations ==
These were published on United Media's site and/or Comics.com; many moved to GoComics:

- Barkeater Lake by Corey Pandolph (early 2004 – January 5, 2007)
- Boy on a Stick and Slither by Steven L. Cloud (April 2007 – February 2009)
- Doctor Fun by David Farley (1995–2003)
- Jane's World by Paige Braddock (launched 2001; entered print syndication in 2002)
- Little Dee by Christopher Baldwin (2006–c. 2007)
- Minimum Security by Stephanie McMillan (launched 2007)
- Mr. Futz (2001)
- Pearls Before Swine by Stephan Pastis (launched 2000; entered print syndication in late 2001)
- Pibgorn by Brooke McEldowney (launched March 11, 2002)
- Working Daze originally by John Zakour and Andre Noel (launched 2001; eventually became print syndicated)

== Syndicated columns ==
- A+ Advice for Parents Helping Your Child Succeed in School by Leanna Landsmann
- The Aces on Bridge by Bobby Wolff
- Among Friends by Tad Bartimus
- Animal Doctor by Michael Fox, D.V.M.
- Ask Mr. Know-It-All by Gary Lee Clothier
- Astro-Graph by Bernice Bede Osol
- From Consumer Reports
- Cook Well, Eat Well by Dana Carpender
- Desperation Dinners by Beverly Mills and Alicia Ross (columnist)
- Eat in and Save by Marialisa Calta
- First Aid for the Ailing House by Henri de Marne
- Frugal Living by Sara Noel
- Dr. Gott by Peter Gott
- Harper's Magazine
- The Harvard Medical School Adviser
- The Housing Scene by Lew Sichelman
- Dick Kleiner
- Morton Kondracke
- Donald Lambro
- Kathryn Jean Lopez
- Gene Lyons
- Harvey Mackay
- Mary Mitchell
- Miss Manners by Judith Martin
- NEA Bridge by Phillip Alder
- The New Republic
- NextSteps by Jan L. Warner and Jan K. Collins
- On Nutrition by Ed Blonz
- On Religion by Terry Mattingly
- Parent-to-Parent by Betsy Flagler
- Parenting by the staff of Parenting Magazine
- Cokie Roberts and Steven V. Roberts
- Salon
- Sense & Sensitivity by Harriette Cole
- Smart Money by Bruce Williams
- Soap Opera Review by Nancy Johnson (columnist)
- Starlight
- Sweet Land of Liberty by Nat Hentoff
- Talking Money with Jean Chatzky
- The Village Idiot by Jim Mullen
- Tune in Tomorrow by Nancy Reichardt
- Tune in Tonight by Kevin McDonough
- Diana West
- Win, Lose & Drew
- World Almanac Databank
- You Be the Critic by Bob Habes
- Your Birthday by Stella Wilder
- Your Stars This Week by Stella Wilder
- Byron York

== Syndicated puzzles ==
- Today's Daily Crossword
- Today's Sunday Crossword
- KenKen
- Sudoku
- Kakuro

== Licensed properties ==
- El Chavo
- Precious Moments
- Raggedy Ann
