= United Feature Syndicate =

American newspaper syndication service

- United Feature Syndicate logo used in the 1980s
- Type: Print syndication
- Founded: 1919; 107 years ago
- Founder: E. W. Scripps
- Defunct: 2011; 15 years ago
- Fate: Acquisition by Andrews McMeel Universal
- Successor: Andrews McMeel Syndication
- Headquarters: Chicago, Illinois, United States
- Key people: Norris Huse (General Manager, c. 1919–1928); Monte Bourjaily (General Manager, 1928–c. 1937)
- Products: Peanuts; Garfield; Li'l Abner; Dilbert; Monty; Nancy; Over the Hedge; Marmaduke
- Services: editorial columns and comic strips
- Parent: E. W. Scripps Company (1919–1978); United Media (1978–2011); Andrews McMeel Universal (2011–present)
- Divisions: North American Newspaper Alliance (1972–c. 1980)

United Feature Syndicate, Inc. (UFS) was a large American editorial column and comic strip newspaper syndication service based in the United States and established in 1919. Originally part of E. W. Scripps Company, it was part of United Media (along with the Newspaper Enterprise Association) from 1978 to 2011, it was succeeded by Andrews McMeel Syndication. United Features has syndicated many notable comic strips, including Peanuts, Garfield, Li'l Abner, Dilbert, Monty, Nancy, Over the Hedge, and Marmaduke.

== History ==
United Feature Syndicate was formed in 1919. From 1922 to 1958, United Features was the column, feature (and comics) division of Scripps' United Press Association. Authors syndicated by United Features in its early years included Frank A. Vanderlip, Octavus Roy Cohen, David Lloyd George, Vicente Blasco Ibáñez, Herbert Hoover, Sinclair Lewis, Benito Mussolini, Édouard Herriot, and Heywood Broun.

It became a dominant player in the syndication market in the early 1930s. In March 1930, United Features acquired the Metropolitan Newspaper Service (ostensibly from the Bell Syndicate). And in late February 1931, Scripps acquired the New York World, which controlled the syndication arms of the Pulitzer company: World Feature Service and Press Publishing Co. (which unlike other syndicates were owned by the paper rather than being separate entities).

The Metropolitan Newspaper Service acquisition brought over the comic strips Tarzan and Ella Cinders. The World Feature Service acquisition brought over the comic strips The Captain and the Kids, Everyday Movies, Fritzi Ritz, Hawkshaw the Detective, Joe Jinks, and Little Mary Mixup. From this point, United Features became a successful distributor of newspaper comics, for the first time distributing color Sunday strips. An April 1933 article in Fortune described United Features as one of the "Big Four" American syndicates (along with King Features Syndicate, Chicago Tribune Syndicate, and the Bell Syndicate).

In 1934, United Features launched its first original strip, Al Capp's Li'l Abner. As Li'l Abner's popularity increased, creator Capp lampooned United Features in his strip-within-a-strip, Fearless Fosdick, which featured the abusive and corrupt "Squeezeblood Syndicate."

Robert M. Hall was a sales manager at United Features starting in 1935; he left in 1944 to start the Post Syndicate.

From 1936 to 1954, United Feature published their own line of comic books, using their comic strip features as characters. Lev Gleason, who in the 1940s and 1950s published a number of popular comics titles, was an editor at United Feature in the beginning, including the company's first title, Tip Top Comics. Three United Feature titles published more than 100 issues: Tip Top Comics (188 issues, Apr. 1936–Sept./Oct. 1954), Sparkler Comics (120 issues, July 1941–Nov./Dec. 1954), and Comics on Parade (104 issues, Apr. 1938–Feb. 1955). The company even created its own original superheroes: Iron Vic, Mirror Man, and Spark Man (none of whom caught on). After ending the United Feature comics line in 1954, a few of their titles would be continued by St. John Publications. The rest of their comic book properties were acquired by Dell Comics in 1958.

In 1968, United Features syndicated about 50 features to 1500 clients.

In 1972, United Features Syndicate acquired and absorbed the North American Newspaper Alliance and the Bell-McClure Syndicate into its operations.

In May 1978, Scripps merged United Feature Syndicate and the Newspaper Enterprise Association to form United Media Enterprises. United Media continued to syndicate strips under the United Feature Syndicate brand.

In 1994, Jim Davis's company, Paws, Inc., purchased the rights to Garfield (including the strips from 1978 to 1993) from United Features. The strip is currently distributed by Andrews McMeel Syndication, while rights for the strip remain with Paws.

On February 24, 2011, United Media negotiated with Universal Uclick (now known as Andrews McMeel Syndication) to distribute their 150 syndicated comic strip and news features, which became effective on June 1 of that year. While United Media effectively ceased to exist, Scripps still maintains copyrights and intellectual property rights.

== United Feature Syndicate comic strips ==
=== Current strips ===
==== Branded Andrews-McMeel ====
- 9 Chickweed Lane by Brooke McEldowney (launched 1993)
- Betty by Gary Delainey and Gerry Rasmussen (launched 1991)
- Brevity, currently by Dan Thompson (launched January 3, 2005)
- The Buckets originally by Scott Stantis (1994–present) — acquired from Tribune Media Services where in launched in 1990
- Drabble by Kevin Fagan (launched 1979)
- Frazz by Jef Mallett (launched 2001)
- F Minus (launched 2002; entered syndication 2006)
- Garfield by Jim Davis (June 19, 1978 – 1993; moved to Universal Press Syndicate, which is now part of the same company that owns United Features)
- Get Fuzzy by Darby Conley (launched 1999)
- Graffiti by Gene Mora (launched May 3, 2011)
- Grand Avenue originally by Steve Breen; now by Mike Thompson (launched 1999)
- Health Capsules originally by Dr. Michael Petti and Jud Hurd; then by Bron Smith (launched 1961)
- Jump Start by Robb Armstrong (launched 1989)
- KidSpot by Dan Thompson (launched 2011)
- KidTown by Steve McGarry (launched 2011) — formerly known as KidCity
- The Knight Life by Keith Knight (launched 2008)
- Lola by Todd Clark (2005–present) — acquired from Tribune Media Services, where it launched in 1999
- Luann by Greg Evans (1996–present) — acquired from North America Syndicate, where it launched in 1985
- Marmaduke originally by Brad Anderson (c. 1970–present) — acquired from National Newspaper Syndicate where it launched in 1954
- Monty by Jim Meddick (launched 1985)
- Nancy originally by Ernie Bushmiller (launched 1938)
- Off the Mark by Mark Parisi (launched 1987)
- Over the Hedge by Michael Fry & T. Lewis (launched 1995)
- Peanuts by Charles M. Schulz (1950–2000) — in reprints
- Pearls Before Swine by Stephan Pastis (launched 2001)
- Prickly City by Scott Stantis (launched 2004)
- Reality Check by Dave Whamond (launched 1995)
- Rip Haywire by Dan Thompson (launched 2009)
- Ripley's Believe It or Not! (1989–present) — acquired from King Features Syndicate; originally launched 1918
- Rose Is Rose originally by Pat Brady (launched 1984)
- Shortcuts by Jeff Harris (launched 1999)
- Tarzan originally by Hal Foster (1932–2001) — acquired from Metropolitan Newspaper Service where it launched in 1929; in reprints
- Uncle Art's Funland originally by Art Nugent (launched 1933) — acquired from Bell-McClure Syndicate in 1972
- World of Wonder by Laurie Triefeldt (launched 2000)

=== Former and concluded United Features strips ===
- Abbie an' Slats by Al Capp and Raeburn Van Buren (July 12, 1937 – January 30, 1971)
- Alice in Wonderland by Edward D. Kuekes and Olive Ray Scott (1934-1935) — based on the Lewis Carroll book
- Ask Shagg by Peter Guren (1980–1995; moved to Creators Syndicate)
- Back Home Again by Ed Dodd (1930 – 1945)
- Berry's World by Jim Berry (1963 – 2003)
- Billy Make Believe by Harry E. Homan (begun 1934; end-date uncertain)
- Biography (June 1, 1986–1991) by John Roman (1986–1989) and Steve McGarry (1989–1991)
- Broncho Bill by Harry O'Neill (1927–1950) and then Fred L. Meagher (1950)— originally Young Buffalo Bill (1927–c. 1930), then Buckaroo Bill (c. 1930–1932), then Broncho Bill (1950–1956), an early Western strip featuring a group known as Boy Rangers then Buffalo Bill (1950–1956)
- The Captain and the Kids by Rudolph Dirks and later John Dirks (1919–1979) — acquired from World Feature Service in 1931
- Casey Ruggles by Warren Tufts (1949 – 1954)
- Committed by Michael Fry (1994 – 2006)
- Condorito originally by René Pepo Ríos (13 August 1949 – 1993; moved to Universal Press Syndicate)
- Cow and Boy by Mark Leiknes (2006–2012)
- Cynical Susie by Laverne Harding and "Becky Sharp" (Helen Sharp) (1933–c. 1937)
- Dickey's Dogs (also known as Buddie and his Friends, Just Dogs, and then after being acquired by UFS, Mr. and Mrs. Beans and then Buster Beans) by Robert L. Dickey (July 14, 1919 – July 21, 1940) — acquired in 1930 from Metropolitan Newspaper Service
- Diesel Sweeties by Richard Stevens III (January 2007 – August 2008) — returned to web distribution
- Dilbert by Scott Adams (1989–2011; moved to Universal Uclick/Andrews McMeel Syndication, where it continues today)
- The Doings of the Duffs originally by Walter R. Allman, then Ben Batsford & Buford Tune (1928 – 1931; originated with the Newspaper Enterprise Association in 1925)
- The Dropouts by Howard Post (1968 – 1981)
- Ella Cinders by Bill Conselman and Charles Plumb (June 1, 1925 – 1961) — acquired in 1930 from Metropolitan Newspaper Service
- Everyday Movies (also known as Metropolitan Movies) by Denys Wortman (1931–1954) — gag panel acquired from World Feature Service where it originated in 1921
- Ferd'nand by Henning Dahl Mikkelsen (Nov. 1937–2012)
- The Doodle Family (later Frankie Doodle) by Ben Batsford (1934 – 1938)
- Freshly Squeezed by Ed Stein (September 20, 2010 – October 19, 2014; in reruns)
- Fritzi Ritz, originally by Larry Whittington (1922 – 1938; Sundays 1929 – 1968) — acquired from World Feature Service in 1931
- Funny Side Up by Abner Dean (1940–c. 1941)
- Gamin and Patches by Mort Walker (April 27, 1987 – 1988)
- Geech by Jerry Bittle (2000-2003; inherited from Universal Press Syndicate where it debuted in 1982
- Good Old Days by Erwin L. Hess (June 9, 1946 – March 29, 1981)
- Gordo by Gus Arriola (November 24, 1941 – March 2, 1985)
- Grin and Bear It by George Lichty (March 1932 – 1940; moved to Field Newspaper Syndicate and eventually King Features, where it ran until 2015)
- Gummer Street by Phil Krohn (1970-?)
- Hap Hopper, Washington Correspondent (1940 – May 14, 1949) by Jack Sparling, William Laas, Drew Pearson, and Robert S. Allen
- Hawkshaw the Detective, originally by Gus Mager (1913 – 1922, 1931 – 1952) — acquired from World Feature Service in 1931
- Herman by Jim Unger (1975–1992)
- Howdy Doody written by Edward Kean & Stan Lee, and illustrated by Chad Grothkopf (October 15, 1950 – June 21, 1953) — Sunday strip only
- It's Only a Game by Charles M. Schulz and Jim Sasseville (October 1957 – January 1959)
- Jane's World by Paige Braddock (April 1, 2002 – October 19, 2018)
- Jim Hardy by Dick Moores (1936 – 1942)
- Joe's Car by Victor Forsythe (1918–1928); became Joe Jinks (1928–1934); became Joe Jinks & Dynamite Dunn (1934–1945) by Pete Llanuza (1934–1936) and Sam Leff & Mo Leff (1944–1945); became Curly Kayoe by Henry Formhals (1945-1953) — acquired from World Feature Service in 1931
- John Carter of Mars by John Coleman Burroughs (December 7, 1941–March 1943)
- Judge Wright by Robert Bernstein and Bob Fujitani (September 10, 1945 – April 3, 1948)
- Li'l Abner by Al Capp (August 13, 1934 – 1964; moved to Chicago Tribune New York News Syndicate)
- Little Mary Mixup by Robert Moore Brinkerhof (1917–1956) — acquired from World Feature Service in 1931
- Long Sam by Al Capp and Bob Lubbers (1954 – 1962)
- Mamie by Russell Patterson (1951–1956)
- Meg! by Greg Curfman (1997–c. 2007; in reruns)
- Mitzi McCoy (later titled Kevin the Bold, then Up Anchor) by Kreigh Collins (November 7, 1948 – 1972)
- Off the Leash by W. B. Park (1989–1999)
- Oh! Margy by John Held Jr. (April 6, 1924 – May 22, 1927)
- Ophelia and Jake by Heidi Stetson (January 25, 1988 – August 18, 1991)
- Queen of the Universe by Sam Hurt (1990–1992)
- Race Riley and the Commandos by Milburn Rosser (1940s)
- The Real-Great Adventures of Terr’ble Thompson!, Hero of History, by Gene Deitch (October 16, 1955 – April 14, 1956)
- Rudy by William Overgard (January 3, 1983 – December 22, 1985)
- Rudy Park by Theron Heir and Darrin Bell (2011–c. 2011; moved to Washington Post Writers Group, where it concluded in 2018)
- Secret Asian Man by Tak Toyoshima (July 16, 2007 – September 19, 2009)
- Skylark by Elmer Woggon (1929)
- Spot the Frog by Mark Heath (January 5, 2004 – July 5, 2008)
- Spunkie by Loy Byrnes (December 16, 1940 – March 21, 1942)
- Star Hawks by Gil Kane and Ron Goulart (c. 1979 – May 2, 1981) — inherited from NEA, where it launched in 1977)
- The Sunshine Club by Howie Schneider (October 6, 2003 – 2007; in reruns)
- Suzie View by Tauhid Bondia and Erik McCurdy (September 2004 – March 8, 2005)
- Tailspin Tommy by Hal Forrest (1940–1942; continued from Bell Syndicate where it was launched in 1928)
- There Oughta Be a Law! (c. 1972–c. 1984) by Frank Borth, Warren Whipple, and Mort Gerberg — acquired from Bell-McClure Syndicate, where it was launched in 1944
- Tubby by Doc Winner (March 19, 1923 – June 5, 1926)
- Twin Earths by Oskar Lebeck and Alden McWilliams (1952–1963)
- Up Front by Bill Mauldin
- U.S. Acres (AKA Orson's Farm or Orson's Place) by Jim Davis (1986 – 1989)
- Wee Pals (1970s–c. 1987; moved to Creators Syndicate) — came over from Lew Little Enterprises
- Wright Angles by Larry Wright (1976-1990)

== United Feature comic books (selected) ==
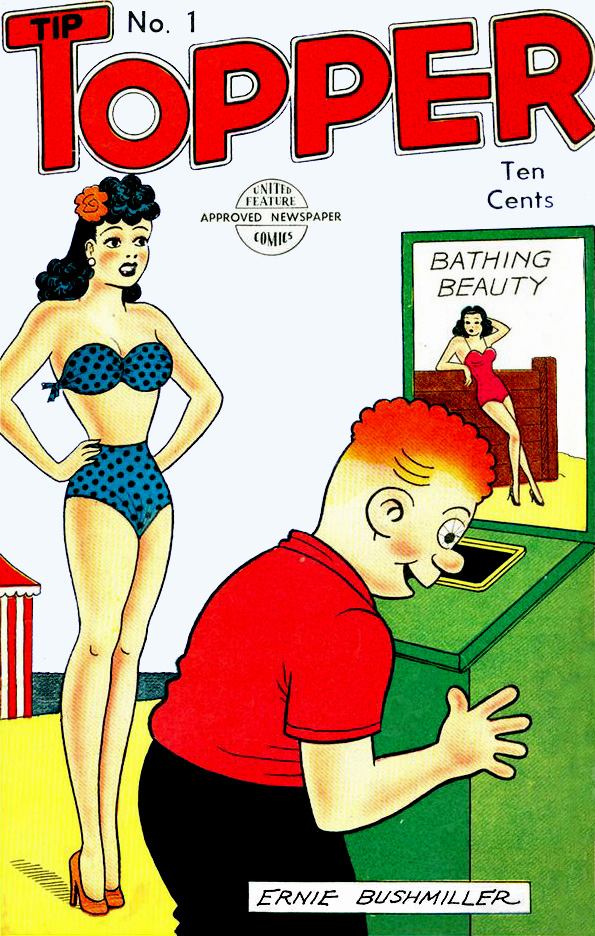
Fritzi Ritz and Phil Fumble, Tip Topper no. 1, October, 1949.

- The Captain and the Kids (17 issues, 1949–1953)
- Comics on Parade (104 issues, Apr. 1938–Feb. 1955)
- Curly Kayoe (7 issues, 1946–1950)
- Fritzi Ritz (15 issues, 1949, Mar./Apr. 1953–Sept./Oct. 1954) — continued by St. John Publications
- Nancy and Sluggo (8 issues, 1949–1954) — continued by St. John Publications
- Single Series (30 issues, 1938–1942)
- Sparkle Comics (33 issues, Oct./Nov. 1948–Dec. 1953/Jan. 1954)
- Sparkler Comics (120 issues, July 1941–Nov./Dec. 1954)
- Tip Top Comics (188 issues, Apr. 1936–Sept./Oct. 1954) — continued by St. John Publications
- Tip Topper Comics (28 issues, Oct./Nov. 1949–Apr./May 1954)
- United Comics (19 issues, 1950–Jan./Feb. 1953)

== Syndicated editorial cartoons ==
- Matt Bors
- Bill Day
- Jerry Holbert
- Mike Lester
- Henry Payne
- Ed Stein

== Syndicated columns ==
- A+ Advice for Parents: Helping Your Child Succeed in School by Leanna Landsmann
- The Aces on Bridge by Bobby Wolff
- Among Friends by Tad Bartimus
- Animal Doctor by Michael Fox, D.V.M.
- Ask Mr. Know-It-All by Gary Lee Clothier
- From Consumer Reports
- Cook Well, Eat Well by Dana Carpender
- Desperation Dinners by Beverly Mills and Alicia Ross
- Eat in and Save by Marialisa Calta
- First Aid for the Ailing House by Henri deMarne
- Frugal Living by Sara Noel
- Dr. Gott by Peter Gott
- Harper's Magazine
- The Harvard Medical School Adviser
- The Housing Scene by Lew Sichelman
- Dick Kleiner
- Harvey Mackay
- Mary Mitchell
- Miss Manners by Judith Martin
- The New Republic
- NextSteps by Jan L. Warner and Jan K. Collins
- On Nutrition by Ed Blonz
- Parent-to-Parent by Betsy Flagler
- Parenting by the staff of Parenting magazine
- Salon
- Smart Money by Bruce Williams
- Soap Opera Review by Nancy Johnson
- Starlight
- Sweet Land of Liberty by Nat Hentoff
- Talking Money with Jean Chatzky
- Tune in Tomorrow by Nancy Reichardt
- Tune in Tonight by Kevin McDonough
- Diana West
- workplace911 by Bob Rosner
- World Almanac Databank
- You Be the Critic by Bob Habes
- Your Birthday by Stella Wilder
- Your Stars This Week by Stella Wilder

== Licensed properties ==
- El Chavo
- Precious Moments
- Raggedy Ann

== Discontinued features ==
- Frederick C. by Fred Othman (1948–1949)
- My Day by Eleanor Roosevelt (1935–1962)
- Robert Ruark (late 1940s–early 1950s)
- Skolsky's Hollywood by Sidney Skolsky (1930s–c. 1970s)
- Totem Pole by H. Allen Smith (1940s–1950s)
- Washington Calling by Marquis Childs (1962–c. 1980s)
- Washington Merry-Go-Round by Drew Pearson (1932–1944) and Jack Anderson
