= Barkeater Lake =

Webcomic by Corey Pandolph

Barkeater Lake is a webcomic by cartoonist Corey Pandolph, originally published by United Media as part of its Comics.com website from early 2004 through January 5, 2007. Pandolph began publishing the online strip independently on January 22, 2007.

Pandolph has published two trade paperback collections: Welcome to Barkeater Lake and Escape from Barkeater Lake.

On September 4, 2009, shortly after the strip returned to GoComics.com, Pandolph announced the strip would end its run October 31, 2009.

== About ==
The ensemble strip, taking place in the titular small Adirondack Mountains town in New York state, revolves around the surreal, picaresque misadventures of big-city expatriate Delores Tanzini, eccentric locals, and the two owner-proprietors of local gathering spot Chuck's Bar: Chuck, a former Olympics bobsled contender and coach, and Banks, a jaded and erudite anthropomorphic dog. Recurring characters include Delores' mother, the vodka-sipping evil mastermind Sabrina Tanzini; Sabrina's ex-husband and present butler, Winston; and what is eventually revealed, after several guest appearances, as hallucinations involving the fallen angel Satan, tired of his career and looking to settle down.

Regulars in the strip have included Allen MacIntire, a young, hapless pharmacist; and Jack, the principal at the local high school, where the attractive young Delores teaches physical education and coaches the varsity football team.

== Corey Pandolph ==
Cartoonist Pandolph was born and raised in the Adirondack Mountains town of Saranac Lake, New York. He and his wife, Kristen MacIntire Pandolph moved to Portland, Maine in 1998; there Pandolph began illustrating for a local alternative newspaper and eventually sold Barkeater Lake to United Media.

Following Barkeater Lake, Pandolph created the online and print-syndicated comic strips TOBY: Robot Satan a.k.a. Toby, and took over artist duties on The Elderberries from Phil Frank.

In October 2005 Pandolph and fellow United Media cartoonist Stephan Pastis (Pearls Before Swine) auctioned signed original Sunday strips on eBay to raise money for victims of Hurricane Katrina.
