= Jane's World =

Gay-themed comic strip by Paige Braddock

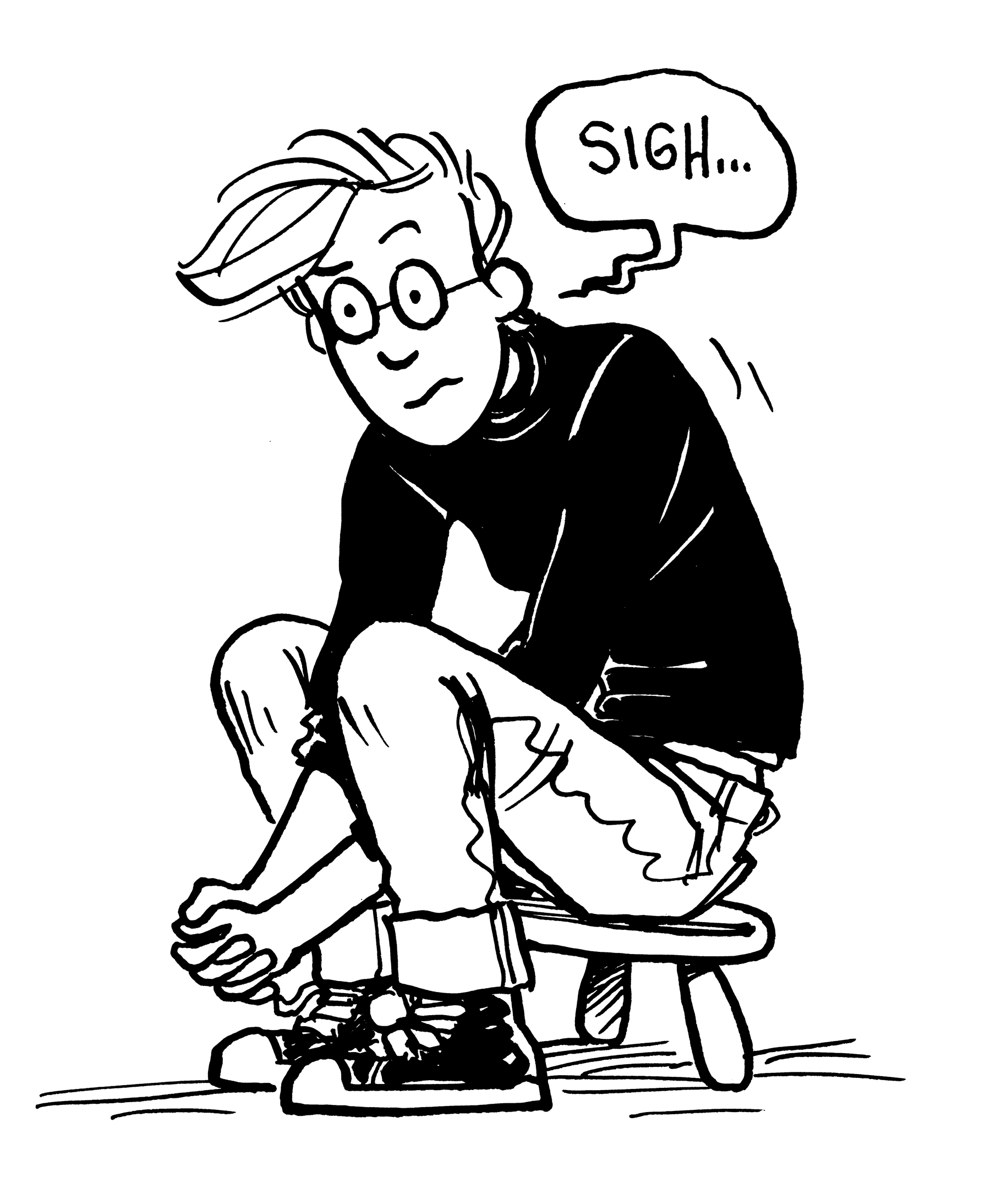
- Jane of Jane's World
- Author: Paige Braddock
- Website: www.gocomics.com/janesworld
- Current status/schedule: Concluded; Can still be found at GoComics
- Launch date: March 25, 1998; entered syndication on April 1, 2002
- End date: October 19, 2018
- Syndicate(s): United Feature Syndicate
- Genre(s): Humor, Lesbians

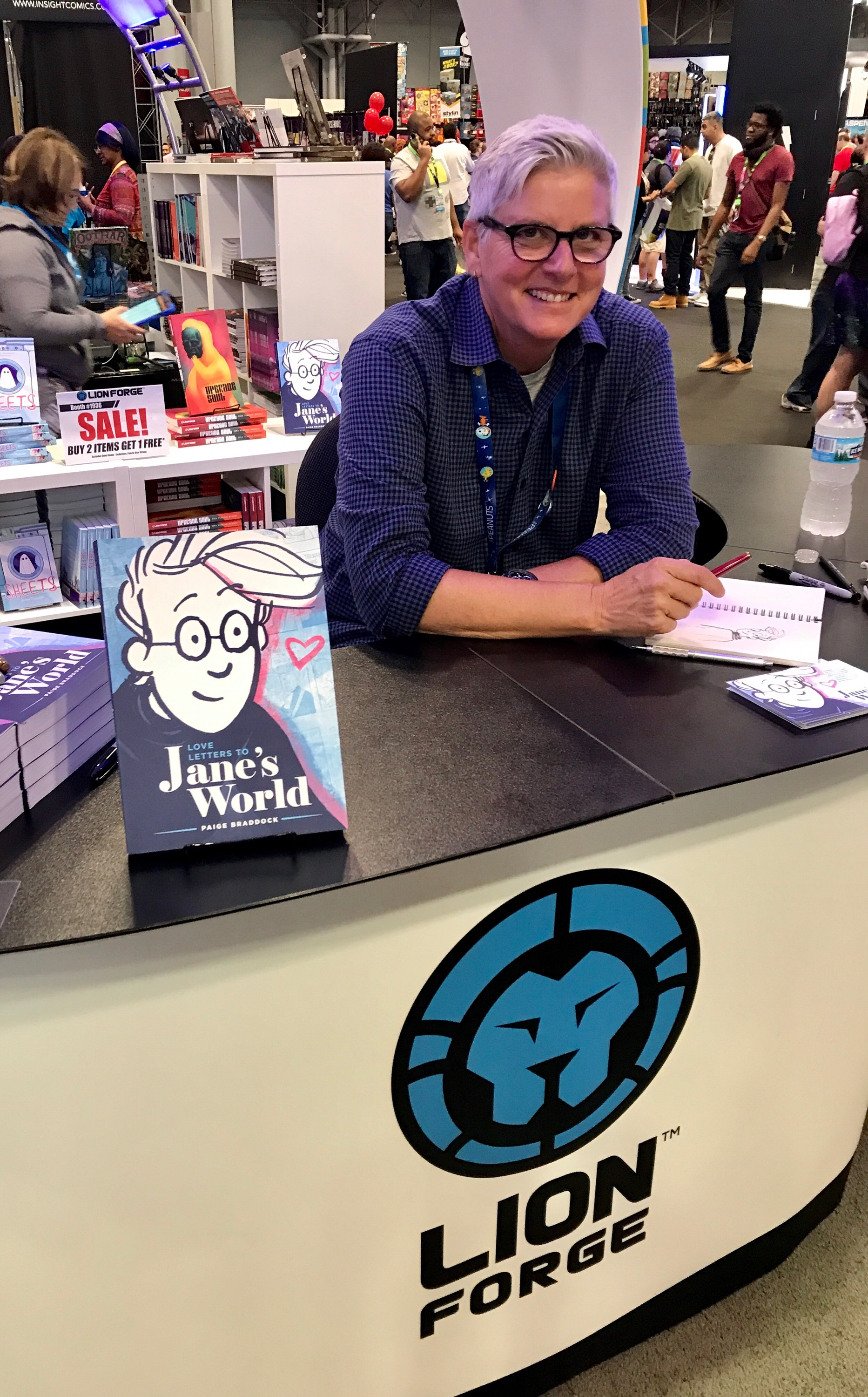
Paige Braddock, author of Jane's World

Jane's World was a comic strip by cartoonist Paige Braddock that ran from March 1998 to October 2018. Featuring lesbian and bisexual women characters, the strip stars Jane Wyatt, a young lesbian living in a trailer in Northern California with her straight male roommate, Ethan, and follows her life with her circle of friends, romances, and exes. Shortly after celebrating its 20th anniversary, publication ended with Jane marrying Dorothy.

The comic strip is notable for being the first gay-themed comic work to receive online distribution by a national newspaper syndicate in the United States. In 2006, Paige Braddock was nominated for an Eisner Award as Best Writer/Artist–Humor for Jane's World.

== Comic strip ==
Braddock created Jane's World so that women, particularly lesbians, would have a comic strip character that they could relate to, though it's meant to be accessible to a wider audience. Braddock devised Jane in 1991 but never actually put her onto paper until 1998, and began publishing on the Internet in late March.

In 2001, United Media's Comics.com website picked up reprints of Jane's World, making it the first gay-themed work to receive distribution by a national media syndicate.

In April 2002, it was picked up for print syndication by United Media's United Feature Syndicate. They began publishing new works in 2007.

In addition to web and newspaper publication, Braddock published the strip in a comic book format through her own publication house, Girl Twirl Comics. The trade paperback versions feature covers created by different artists.

== Characters ==
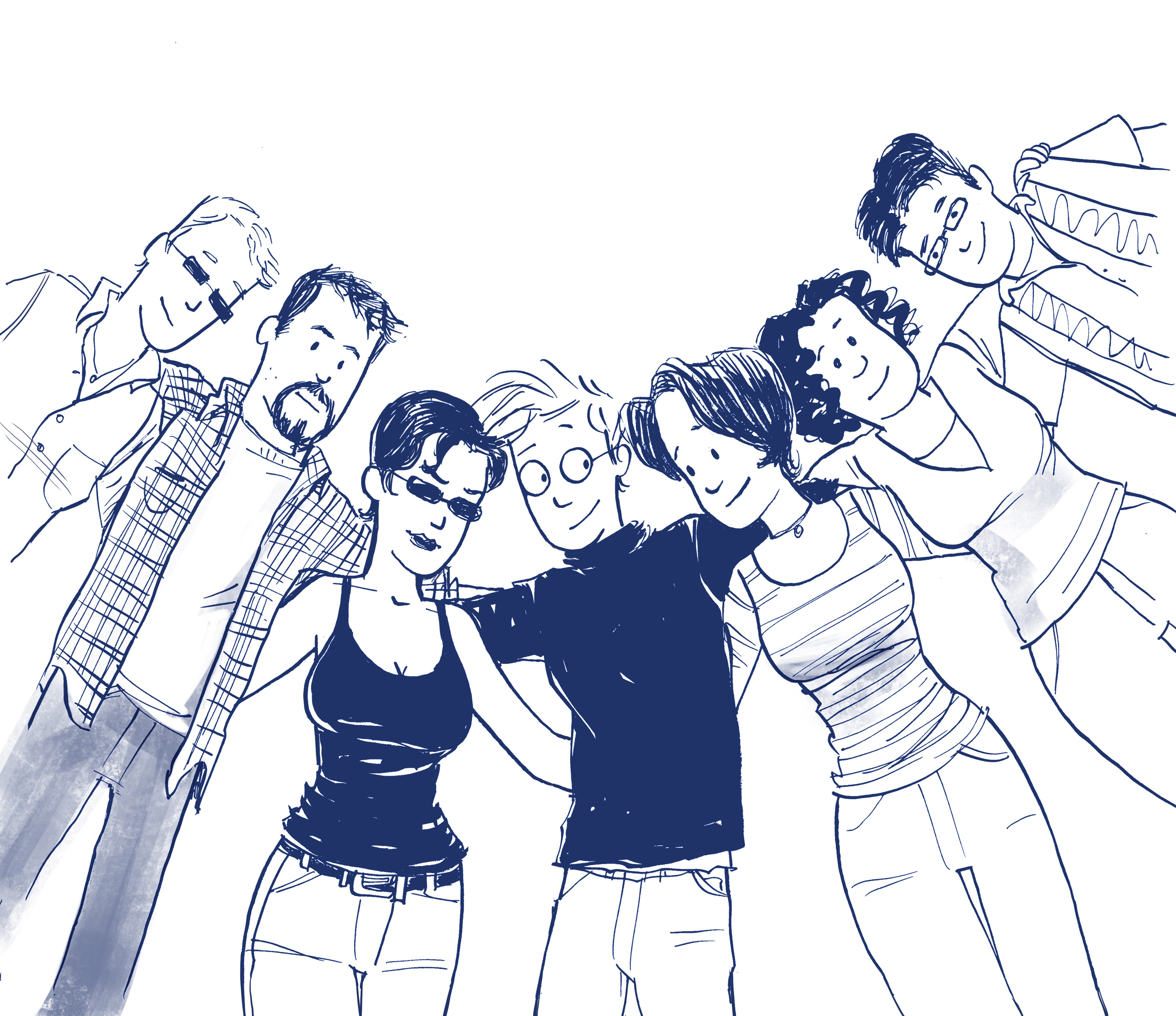
Jane's World characters are all friends, to various degrees, and romantic interests of Jane, along with the occasional ex-girlfriend, coworker, and boss in the mix.

- Jane Wyatt, the protagonist of Jane’s World. Her middle name, Tiberius, was given by her dad, a Star Trek fan. She is a white, soft butch, lesbian, who is in and out of jobs, in and out of housing, in and out of comical blunders and cosmic dimensions, and in and out of relationships. Jane has run-ins with exes as well as the Log Cabin Republicans, The Star League of The Last Starfighter, Amazon Island, zombies, to name a few.
- Rusty, Jane's mixed-breed dog. He has a brown ring around his left eye. The comic strip begins with a Rusty storyline that introduces Jane and her circle of friends and family.
- Dorothy, Jane's best friend, and on-again, off-again girlfriend. Dorothy runs the coffee shop, Hard Drive Cafe, where many of the comic strip's plots take place. Unbeknownst to either of them, their mothers tried to play matchmakers and arranged for Jane and Dorothy to get together one evening. Things heated up between them but Jane became confused after Skye showed her some interest. The comic strip concludes with Jane and Dorothy getting married.
- Ethan, Jane's straight male roommate and best dude. Their romantic relationships with women often get in the way of their friendship. Ethan has a gay brother named Julian.
- Chelle, visually reminiscent of Trinity in The Matrix. She rides a motorcycle, has a special ops background, and a past she is trying to get away from. Despite her coolness, Chelle dates Jane, and remains a good friend post breakup.
- Dorrie and Archie, Jane's friends and co-workers at The Daily News. Dorrie is African American, a lesbian, and has a crush on Chelle. Archie is Asian American, straight, and is not amused by Jane's antics at work or in her relationships.
- Skye, one of Jane's love interests who works at The Garden of Vegan diner. She unsuccessfully tries to get Jane to eat healthier while they're dating. She's also a surfer.
- Jill, Chelle's on-again, off-again girlfriend. She was Chelle's former partner on the police force, and prior to that, a United States Navy diver. She is often portrayed as Jane's nemesis. Jill never has a problem attracting women.
- Talia, an ex-girlfriend of Jane's that pops in and out of the strip. She's bisexual and went to college with Jane.
- Bud, Jane's laid-back cousin and car mechanic.
- Shallow Breast Guy, based on cartoonist Stephan Pastis, creator of Pearls Before Swine, this character appears only occasionally as a breast-obsessed, straight male. Shallow Breast Guy is drawn to look like Pastis. He once took control of the strip and drew Jane's World in the style of Pearls Before Swine, endowing the women with large breasts and portraying them as hyper-sexualized, thereby earning his nickname. In turn, Pastis has featured Braddock's wiener dog Andy (and, less frequently, Olive) in his strip.

== Books ==
- Love Letters to Jane's World, Lion Forge, 2018
- Jane's World: The Case of the Mail Order Bride, Bold Strokes Books, 2016
- Jane's World, Volume 11, Girl Twirl Comics, 2014
- Jane's World, Volume 10, The New Frontier, Girl Twirl Comics, 2011
- Jane's World, Volume 9, Girl Twirl Comics, 2009
- Jane's World, Volume 8, Girl Twirl Comics, 2008
- Jane's World, Collection 1 (first 15 issues), Girl Twirl Comics, 2007
- Jane's World, Volume 7, Girl Twirl Comics, 2007
- Jane's World, Volume 6, Girl Twirl Comics, 2006
- Jane's World, Volume 5, Girl Twirl Comics, 2006
- Jane's World, Volume 4, Girl Twirl Comics, 2006
- Jane's World, Volume 3, Girl Twirl Comics, 2005
- Jane's World, Volume 2, Girl Twirl Comics, 2004
- Jane's World, Volume 1, Girl Twirl Comics, 2003

== See also ==
- List of female comics creators
- List of feminist comic books
- List of webcomics with LGBT characters
- Dykes to Watch Out For
- Hothead Paisan: Homicidal Lesbian Terrorist
- Wimmen's Comix
