= 2025 FIVB Women's Volleyball World Championship broadcasting rights =

The 2025 FIVB Women's Volleyball World Championship is the planned women's volleyball tournament to take place in Thailand from 22 August to 7 September 2025, involving 32 women's national teams from nations affiliated to the Fédération Internationale de Volleyball (FIVB). The tournament will be broadcast all over the world through VBTV streaming service and several local broadcasters.

== Broadcasters ==
Country/Region	Broadcaster	Ref.
Bosnia and Herzegovina	United Media	
Brazil	Globo	
China	CCTV5 (Note: Only broadcast the matches of team China.)	
Croatia	United Media	
Maldives	ICE Sports	
North Macedonia	United Media	
Poland	Polsat	
Serbia	United Media	
Slovenia	United Media	
Thailand	PPTV, AIS Play	
United States	Big Ten Network, CBS Sports	
