= Shortcuts (comics) =

American comic strip by Jeff Harris

- Author(s): Jeff Harris
- Website: syndication.andrewsmcmeel.com/comics/shortcuts
- Current status/schedule: Current Sunday strip
- Launch date: August 30, 1999; 25 years ago
- Syndicate(s): Newspaper Enterprise Association/United Feature Syndicate
- Genre(s): Humor, Education

Shortcuts is a syndicated Sunday strip by artist and educator Jeff Harris, which is distributed by Andrews McMeel Syndication via the Newspaper Enterprise Association.

== Publication history ==
Shortcuts has been distributed through the Newspaper Enterprise Association (NEA) from back when it was part of United Media. In 2011 Andrews McMeel took over syndication of United Media's strips. Shortcuts continues to be distributed via the NEA but is branded "Distributed by Andrews McMeel via UFS, Inc." (UFS is United Feature Syndicate, another former United Media syndication arm that is now part of Andrews McMeel.)

== Story and characters ==
The weekly feature offers educational lessons, with each strip devoted to a single topic. The diverse cast of characters includes:

- Roland, who wears a computer icon and likes speed and learning new things.
- K, who wears a peace sign and knows girls can do anything.
- James, who is often the victim of unfortunate events.
- Junior, who wears a question mark because he likes to ask questions.
- Juanita, who wears the infinity symbol as a symbol of "infinite knowledge".
- Duke and Duke, a pair of hermit crabs, one happy and one miserable.
