= Kevin Fagan (cartoonist) =

American cartoonist

- Born: June 22, 1956 (age 70) Los Angeles, California, United States
- Area: Cartoonist
- Notable works: Drabble (1979-present)

Kevin Fagan (born June 22, 1956) is an American cartoonist and creator of the syndicated comic strip Drabble. Fagan was born in Los Angeles.

He attended Saddleback College, and later transferred to California State University, Sacramento as a history major. While there, he submitted his work to the student newspaper, the State Hornet. Shortly afterwards, he was discovered by The Sacramento Union, and was subsequently offered a syndication contract by United Media's United Feature Syndicate, and he dropped out of CSUS in 1978, just 3 units short of his degree, to take up cartooning full-time. Drabble debuted nationally on March 5, 1979, when he was 22 years old.

Fagan still draws each and every comic by hand, including all of the lettering and borders. His strip appears in over 100 papers worldwide and online. Eleven Drabble books (most recently "All Wally" in 2017) and a line of greeting cards have been published. Since 1979, Drabble has run daily with the exception of one week in 1983 and one in 2008, due to Fagan's severe illness.

He is married to Cristi, with three children: Sean, Kelsey, and Brian; the family currently resides in Mission Viejo, California.
