= Meg! =

Comic strip

- Author(s): Greg Curfman
- Website: www.gocomics.com/meg-classics
- Current status/schedule: Concluded daily strip; in reruns
- Launch date: March 3, 1997
- End date: June 24, 2001
- Syndicate(s): United Feature Syndicate
- Genre(s): Humor

Meg! (with the exclamation mark) is a comic strip by Greg Curfman and distributed by United Feature Syndicate. The main characters are Meg, an elementary-age soccer player, her little brother Mike (victim of Meg's pranks), their parents, and Meg's friend Ashley. Curfman based much on the series on himself and his family.

== Publication history ==
Meg! entered syndication through United Features on March 3, 1997, running until June 24, 2001. It then was in reruns on GoComics until August 16, 2020.
