= Cow and Boy =

Webcomic by Mark Leiknes

- Author: Mark Leiknes
- Website: www.cowandboy.com
- Current status/schedule: Concluded daily strip
- Launch date: January 2, 2006
- End date: December 31, 2013
- Syndicate(s): United Feature Syndicate (2006–2012)
- Publisher: Andrews McMeel Publishing
- Genre: Humor

Cow and Boy is a webcomic created by Mark Leiknes.

== Publication history ==
Cow and Boy was distributed as a print comic by United Feature Syndicate (UFS), running from January 2, 2006, to December 31, 2012. (While branded with UFS, it was offered as part of the Newspaper Enterprise Association [NEA] package; the NEA was part of United Media, UFS' parent company.)

The strip then moved to CowAndBoy.com as a self-published webcomic supported by voluntary $12/year contributions from readers.

Following an announcement from Leiknes, the web version ended on December 31, 2013.

== Story and characters ==
The strip centers on an eight-year-old boy named Billy and his best friend Cow, who live on Billy's family's farm. Other characters include Billy's father, his friend Martin, and his tutor Smart Billy. Billy's mother and sister have also appeared in previous runs of the strip.

The strip often employs surreal humor, with bizarre recurring gags such as "cat-copters" (cats which dive out of the sky and knock people unconscious).

Ongoing themes include:

- Billy's family's concern about his close friendship with Cow and his need for more human contact.
- Billy and Cow creating fantastic moments.
- Billy and Cow enjoying doing nothing at all.
- Billy's sister and her annoyance with Billy and Cow.
- Cow bringing an outsider's perspective to Billy and Martin's games.
- Billy's concern over the state of the world.
