= Donald Lambro =

American journalist (1940–2023)

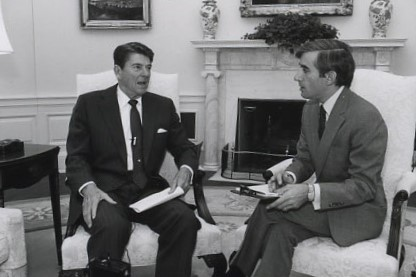
An interview with Ronald Reagan in 1981

Donald Lambro (July 14, 1940 – April 24, 2023) was an American journalist. He was the chief political correspondent of The Washington Times and a columnist formerly nationally syndicated by United Feature Syndicate and now by the Newspaper Enterprise Association.

== Biography ==
Donald Lambro was born in Wellesley, Massachusetts, and graduated from Boston University with a degree in journalism. He began his career working for the Boston Herald-Traveler and in 1968 joined United Press International in Hartford, Connecticut, covering state government.

In 1981, the Conservative Political Action Conference awarded Don Lambro the "Outstanding Journalist Award" for his book Fat City. In 1985, he won the Warren Brookes Award for Excellence in Journalism.

Lambro died on April 24, 2023, at the age of 82.

== Bibliography ==
- The Federal Rathole, 1975 (ISBN 978-0870002946)
- The Conscience of a Young Conservative, 1976 (ISBN 978-0870003448)
- Fat City: How Washington Wastes Your Taxes, 1980 (ISBN 978-0895266804)
- Land of Opportunity: The Entrepreneurial Spirit in America, 1986 (ISBN 9780316512893)
- Washington—City of Scandals: Investigating Congress and Other Big Spenders, 1987 (ISBN 978-0316512886)
