= John Zakour =

American novelist

- Born: 1957 (age 68–69); Geneva, New York, U.S.
- Education: State University of New York at Potsdam (BA)

John Zakour (born 1957) is an American science-fiction and humor writer.

== Biography ==
Zakour was born in upstate New York, in 1957. He is a graduate of the State University of New York at Potsdam where he received a BA in computer science. Before becoming a popular writer he worked for many years as a database programmer/Web guy for the New York State Agricultural Experiment Station, which is part of Cornell University. He has also been an Emergency Medical Technician and a judo instructor. He also has an online MA in human behavior an EdM in Health Education for American College of Education and is a Chief Happiness Practitioner. He is married and has one son.

== Bibliography ==
Science Fiction

- The Plutonium Blonde (Daw 2001, with Larry Ganem)
- The Doomsday Brunette (Daw 2004, with Larry Ganem)
- The Radioactive Redhead (Daw 2005, with Larry Ganem)
- The Frost Haired Vixen (Daw 2006)
- The Blue Haired Bombshell (Daw 2007)
- The Flaxen Femme Fatale (Daw 2008)
- "The Sapphire Sirens" (Daw 2009)
- "The Peach Blonde Bomber" (Short-Prequel) (2013, with Larry Ganem)
- "The Raven Haired Rogue" ( Serializes, 2015)

Young Adult Science Fiction and Fantasy

- Baxter Moon Galactic Scout (Brown Barn Books 2008)
- Illusia (Meadowhawk 2008, with Elizabeth Keller)
- Stormy Knight Prom Queen of the Undead (Blueleaf 2011)
- Diary of a Super Girl" Book 1 (KC Enterprises 2017)
- Diary of a Super Girl" Book 2 (KC Enterprises 2017)
- Diary of a Super Girl" Book 3 (KC Enterprises 2017)
- Diary of a Super Girl" Book 4 (KC Enterprises 2017)
- Diary of a Super Girl" Book 5 (KC Enterprises 2017)
- Diary of a Super Girl" Book 6 (KC Enterprises 2017)
- Diary of a Super Girl" Book 7 (KC Enterprises 2017)
- Diary of a Super Girl" Book 8 (KC Enterprises 2018)
- OMG I Shrunk my BFF" Book 1 (KC Enterprises 2017)
- OMG I Shrunk my BFF" Book 2 (KC Enterprises 2017)
- OMG I Shrunk my BFF" Book 3 (KC Enterprises 2017)
- Girl Power: A Modern Day Fairy Tale: The Once and Future Queen 1 (KC Enterprises 2017)
- Girl Power: Book 2 (KC Enterprises 2017)
- Girl Power: Book 3 (KC Enterprises 2017)
- Diary of a Super Clone: Adam's Story" Book 1 (KC Enterprises 2017)
- Diary of a Super Clone" Book 2 (KC Enterprises 2017)
- Diary of a Super Clone" Book 3 (KC Enterprises 2017)
- Diary of a Super Clone" Book 4 (KC Enterprises 2018)
- Nina the Friendly Vampire" Book 1 (KC Enterprises 2018)
- Nina the Friendly Vampire" Book 2 (KC Enterprises 2018)
- Nina the Friendly Vampire" Book 3 (KC Enterprises 2018)

Interactive

- "The Bionic Bikini I (Delight Games 2014)
- "The Bionic Bikini II (Delight Games 2015)

Humor

- Man's Guide to Pregnancy (Metropolis 2003)
- Man's Guide to Babies (Metropolis 2004)
- Couples Guide to Pregnancy (Blueleaf 2012)
- Man's Guide to Weddings (Blueleaf 2012)

Syndicated Comics

- Working Daze (United Media, Andre Noel artist/co-creator, followed by Kyler Miller, then Scott Roberts)
- Writer for the Rugrats comics

Computer Games / Apps

- 80 Days (Dialog, English version, Frogwares)
- "Space Run" (Frogwares)
- Idol Killer (Story, Idol Games)
- StarDroid (Story, Dialogues, Krauss & Boll Software)
- "Beat the Boss 4" (Dialogs, Game Hive)
- "Tap Tycoon" (Dialogs and Businesses, Game Hive)

•"Oho's Big Day!" (Kids app EzEz apps)

Short Stories

- "Dog Gone" (Sirius The Dog Star, Daw 2004)
- "Double Trouble" (Gateways, Daw 2005)
- "Modern Mating" (Journal of Nature, Futures, 19 July 2007)

Comic Books

- The Simpsons
- Fairly Odd Parents
- Jimmy Neutron
- Rugrats all Grown Up
