= Lola (comic strip) =

American comic strip by Todd Clark

- Author(s): Todd Clark; Steve Dickenson (Sundays only, 1999–2008)
- Website: www.gocomics.com/lola
- Current status/schedule: Ongoing daily & Sunday strip
- Launch date: 1999; 26 years ago
- Syndicate(s): Tribune Media Services (1999–2005); United Feature Syndicate (2005–present)
- Genre: Humor

Lola is an American gag-a-day comic strip by Todd Clark syndicated since 1999. It is published daily and centers on the eponymous Lola Rayder, an old widow who moved in with her son and his family after the death of her husband, Crawford.

== Characters ==
- Lola Rayder, the protagonist.
- Ray Rayder, Lola's son with whom she lives.
- Amy Rayder, Ray's wife.
- Sammy Rayder, Ray's son. He has red hair and wears glasses.
- Etta, a black woman with whom Lola is friends.
- Cecil, a bearded friend of Lola's.
- Sally, a friend of Lola's.
- Harry, another friend of Lola's.
- Leeanne, a friend of Sammy's.
- Claudia, a neighbour of the Rayders.
- Rhiannon, a child who lives in the same neighbourhood as the Rayders.
- Pastor John, Local Pastor from Lola's church

== Inspiration ==
The main character, Lola Rayder, is inspired by Steve Dickenson's great aunt. Dickenson was Clark’s partner for the strip’s first eight years. The cartoon and real Lola share a tough spirit and a history of service as an officer in the Army during World War II, though Clark said the real Lola was far kinder.

Clark's humor in Lola is inspired by Mad Magazine. In his early life, he would read Mad Magazine and found it to be weird yet interesting. In an interview with The Arizona Daily Star, Clark says "You hear so many cartoonists talk about reading ‘Peanuts’ everyday, but that wasn’t me. We had the paper, but it was Mad magazine that got me going. This is something I hadn’t seen before. It almost seemed like you were doing something wrong or naughty when you were reading Mad because it was weird." He enjoys applying bizarre themes to Lola, like having Lola pulled over by the same cop a lot.

== Cancellation in Arkansas Democrat-Gazette ==
The Arkansas Democrat-Gazette canceled Lola over a fart joke in July 2000. Readers flooded the paper with letters, supporting the comic and asking for it to be reinstated. However, the paper stood its ground citing the that joke "exceeded the boundaries of good taste for the comics pages." Clark reacted with anger that his comic would be canceled over a scatological joke. But, Frank Fellone, the newspaper's deputy managing editor at the time, said that he did not want to condone the coarsening of society.
