= Pearls Before Swine (comics) =

Comic strip by Stephan Pastis

- The cast of "Pearls" in order from left to right: Snuffles, Rat, Stephan Pastis, Pig, Goat, Larry, Guard Duck
- Author: Stephan Pastis
- Current status/schedule: Running
- Launch date: December 31, 2001 (The Washington Post); January 7, 2002
- Syndicate(s): United Feature Syndicate (2001–2011); Andrews McMeel Syndication (2011–present)
- Publisher: Andrews McMeel Publishing
- Genre(s): Humor, black comedy, gag-a-day, satire, anthropomorphic

Pearls Before Swine (also known as Pearls) is an American comic strip written and illustrated by Stephan Pastis. The series began on December 31, 2001. It chronicles the daily lives of an ensemble cast of suburban anthropomorphic animals: Pig, Rat, Zebra, Goat, and a fraternity of crocodiles, as well as a number of supporting characters, one of whom is Pastis himself. Each character represents an aspect of Pastis's personality and worldview. The daily and Sunday comic strip is distributed by Andrews McMeel Syndication (by United Feature Syndicate until 2011). In 2018, Pastis won the National Cartoonists Society's Reuben Award for Cartoonist of the Year for his work on the strip.

The strip's style is notable for its black comedy, simplistic artwork, self-deprecating fourth wall meta-humor, social commentary, mockery of itself or other comic strips, frequently experimental formats, and occasional elaborate stories leading to a pun.

== Publication history ==
Before creating Pearls Before Swine, Pastis worked as a lawyer in California. Bored in his law school classes, he doodled a rat, eventually casting it in a non-syndicated comic strip he called Rat. Rat became one of the main characters in Pearls Before Swine. Pastis continued to draw comics; the character Pig came from a failed strip, The Infirm. In 1999, Pastis first submitted Pearls Before Swine to a few syndicates. Several expressed interest and three accepted it, but they could not convince their sales staff that it was marketable. Amy Lago, an editor at United Media, saw the strip's potential and launched it on the United Media website in November 2000 to see what kind of response it would generate. Pastis recalled in 2009:

United signed me in December 1999, and they put me in development ... where the syndicate says, OK, you were funny in your submission packet, but for all we know, it took you 10 years to come up with these 30 strips. So we want you to keep drawing, and we'll watch you. If you're good, we'll agree to put you in newspapers. A development period can be anywhere from two weeks to a year. Not all cartoonists have to do it, but most do.

Pearls Before Swine debuted in 2001 as a website strip under United Feature Syndicate. When Scott Adams, creator of Dilbert and a supporter of the strip, told his fans about Pearls Before Swine, interest skyrocketed, and the strip was taken to print. Aiding Pastis with the strip's artistic elements was Darby Conley, creator of the comic strip Get Fuzzy.

United Feature Syndicate launched the strip in newspapers on December 31, 2001, in The Washington Post. On January 7, 2002, Pearls was running in approximately 150 papers. Since 2011, it has been appearing in 750 newspapers worldwide.

In January 2021, Andrews McMeel delayed the circulation of a comic arc that depicted Rat, as President of the United States, overthrown in a fictional American coup d'état by Guard Duck, worrying that readers might think of it as inspired by the 2021 United States Capitol attack. The arc was postponed to August/September 2021, and reruns were published in place of the originally scheduled week in January. Pastis and the company both clarified that the strips were a pure coincidence and had been drawn before the riots happened.

== Influences ==
Pearls's style and humor are inspired by several comic strips, chiefly Peanuts, Dilbert, Calvin and Hobbes, Bloom County and The Far Side. Pastis has drawn tributes to these influences in his strip. When asked in an interview whether his profession as an attorney inspired the humor in the comic, he said, "I was very unhappy as a lawyer, and humor is a reaction to and defense against unhappiness. ... if you dislike what you're doing to the extent that I did, it gives you the impetus to get out."

Conley helped teach Pastis the technical aspects of cartooning. The two remain friends, sometimes poking fun at each other in their strips.

== Characters ==
This is a partial list of the strip's major and secondary characters:

=== Rat ===
==== Personality ====
Rat is a megalomaniacal, misanthropic rat who is known to drink and smoke, as well as not care about anything. He is contemptuous toward almost everyone he meets, including the general public, his friends and associates, and even the author of his own comic. Rat holds a high opinion of his own intelligence, frequently inventing sweeping theories about human nature, but ironically he is often fairly poorly informed himself; Pastis describes this trait as Rat's "exaggerated sense of self", which he says is "key" to Rat's character. In addition to his arrogance, Rat is high-strung and impatient, and frequently unleashes angry tirades, physical violence, or elaborate revenge plots against people who anger him.

Rat has held numerous jobs throughout the comic's history. Most frequently, he is seen as a barista at a fictional café called Joe's Roastery. Though Rat tends to be openly rude or dismissive to his customers, he continues to hold this job, because Joe's Roastery has a stringent diversity policy that prevents them from firing the only rat in their staff. In addition to this job, Rat also frequently launches get-rich-quick schemes and runs for political office. His political campaigns are usually unsuccessful, although he did become President of the United States in a 2017 storyline, but was later overthrown in a coup by Guard Duck and replaced with Larry the croc in 2021. Rat's political stances are generally militaristic (e.g. advocating the invasion of France or Mexico); Pastis has described Rat's politics as "somewhere to the right of Dick Cheney".

Rat is also prolifically creative, and is frequently seen attempting to write novels or draw comics. Recurring characters in Rat's writing include Angry Bob, a character who tends to die violently while pursuing happiness and inner peace; Elly Elephant and Henry Hippo, who typically appear in cynical parables about romance; and a nameless, corrupt congressman. Rat has also drawn comics about a misanthropic, alcoholic donkey named Danny Donkey, who briefly came to life in a 2006 storyline.

Though Rat seems to dislike or disdain everyone he meets – including his family, who he generally strives to avoid whenever possible – he does occasionally show moments of kindness. Pig is the most frequent recipient of these moments, as Pastis often uses them "to answer the question, 'Why would Pig be friends with this guy?'" Rat has also nursed romantic feelings for Pig's germaphobic sister, Farina during her rare appearances in the strip.

==== Character history ====
Pastis started drawing Rat in law school, often killing him off for the sake of humor. He would often doodle Rat in classes while bored, and in his early stages Rat was more of a depressed, philosophical character as opposed to the cynical egomaniac he is today. Pastis tested different names for this script before deciding on Rat after his title character.

Later, as he began attempting to get syndicated, Pastis added a second character as Rat's companion. This resulted in the creation of Poe, an amorphous blob that resembled nothing. Newspapers deemed Rat too depressing and Pastis stopped drawing the strip.

Rat was later put into another one of Pastis's comics, Bradbury Road, which was also rejected.

Bradbury Road is the story of Gus, a ten-year-old boy who is befriended by Rat, a cynical rodent who gnaws his way through the wall into Gus' room. Gus, the child of divorced parents, lives with his mother and very rarely sees his father. Reserved and slightly awkward, he spends a lot of time in his own room. For those times when Gus is not around, Rat talks with Jingles, a stuffed, court jester doll that lives on a shelf in the boy's room.

After some rejection, Pastis eventually wrote Pearls Before Swine, an attempt to revive Rat with a less depressing tone. Poe was replaced by Pig, and began syndication by United Media on December 31, 2001.

=== Pig ===
==== Personality ====
Pig is a gentle, optimistic, but dimwitted pig. He is also quite immature, with Pastis stating that he views Pig "as a little kid". He believes that there is good in every being, even his cynical housemate Rat. Pig's lack of knowledge often leads him to misunderstand world issues and social norms; this is compounded by the fact that, when they are explained to him, he frequently mishears or misinterprets important parts of the explanation. Pig also tends to be easily manipulated by Rat's writings; he tends to uncritically believe them and make strident proclamations of support for Rat's viewpoints.

Pig has a deep love for food. On several occasion, he has befriended sentient food items; he has also dated a maple syrup bottle named "Ms. Bootyworth" and founded a religion centered on cheese. In the early days of the strip, he frequently befriended fruits, most notably the Fruit Buddies. He also regularly eats bacon, despite being a pig himself. In addition to his voracious eating habits, Pig is generally slothful and avoids physical activity, causing him to be obese. While he is generally content with his body, he occasionally attempts to lose weight; however, he usually takes only minimal efforts to do so.

Pig has an on-again, off-again relationship with a female pig known as Pigita. Pig's tendency to misspeak often leads him to offend Pigita by unwittingly making rude or sexually forward remarks; Pig's routinely immature behavior is another source of friction in their relationship. Pig tends to get along with his family, though he tends to receive fairly little respect from them.

==== Character history ====
Pig's beginnings lie in The Infirm, a third attempt by Pastis to get syndicated. In this strip, Pastis based the story on a lawyer named Bob Grossman who screwed up a lawsuit brought by a sausage company and was forced to work at the farm the sausage company owned until he made up the difference. Grossman worked with pigs, one of whom told him he was "screwed" because the farmer was only paying minimum wage.

Although The Infirm was rejected, Pastis liked the pig characters so much that he eventually simplified the artwork and one became known simply as "Pig" in the first Pearls strips Pastis sent to the syndicators. In fact, it was Pig's addition to the strip that caused it to be known as Pearls Before Swine – Rat would consistently be imparting his "pearls of wisdom" on Pig only to have it fall on deaf ears. (Pastis also said this was a play on a Biblical verse, part of which reads "neither cast ye pearls before swine".)

=== Goat ===
==== Personality ====
Goat is an intelligent, well-read goat who enjoys discussing world news and philosophical issues. He frequently clashes with Rat due to Rat's poorly informed and relentlessly cynical viewpoints. Goat also attempts to teach Pig about various matters, generally without success. For this reason, he is described on the Pearls website as "the voice of reason that often goes unheard".

Despite his intellect and his generally amiable personality, Goat tends to be socially inept – he is usually uncomfortable around new people, and has fairly little knowledge of pop culture. For this reason, while Goat regularly pursues romantic relationships, his efforts tend to be sabotaged by his awkward behavior. Consequently, when left to his own devices, Goat often prefers to read on his own rather than to spend his time sociably. He also maintains a blog that consistently receives few or no pageviews, a fact for which Rat often mocks him.

==== Name ====
As with most of other animal characters in the strip, Goat is only referred to by the name of his species, Goat. However, in a storyline where Goat travels home and visits his mother, it is revealed that "Goat" is a stage name and that his real name is Paris. This name was chosen as a tribute to Pastis's grandfather, Paris Tripodes.

==== Character history ====
Goat was the third main character to debut in the strip and was the first of two conceived specifically for Pearls (as opposed to Rat and Pig, who as noted appeared in Pastis' rejected strips). He was originally supposed to be a bear, but after the syndicates rejected the idea, Pastis reworked the character into a goat. He first appeared on January 18, 2002. In his earliest appearances, he had a white goatee, but Pastis removed the goatee from Goat's design in the mid-2000s.

=== Zebra ===
==== Personality ====
Zebra is a supportive and caring zebra, who is often seen either writing to his predators or talking about recent deaths. Zebra was the fourth main character to be introduced, as Pastis said in Sgt. Piggy's Lonely Hearts Club Comic that his original intent was for Zebra to be in a limited run. His popularity forced Pastis to include him full-time.

In his earliest appearance, Zebra only communicated with his predators by sending letters back and forth, but he began interacting with them face-to-face after the fraternity of crocodiles moved into his neighborhood in January 2005. Zebra generally serves as a straight man to the crocodiles' schemes, pointing out the various ways in which their plots to eat him are doomed to fail. Zebra's other neighbors include Larry the crocodile's family and a pride of lions. Zebra also owns a pet cat named Snuffles, who commits a wide variety of crimes despite his innocent appearance.

In addition to his communication with predators, Zebra often writes to his relatives on the savannah with potential strategies to protect them against predation; however, these plans consistently fail. Not much is known about the surviving members of his family except for their names (usually named after Pastis' own relatives). Zebra has a brother named Peter, nicknamed "Stumpy" after Larry the croc ate his left leg, and a niece named Joy whom Larry's vegetarian son Junior loves, in memory of Stephan Pastis' grandmother. Zebra has also called his father a few times, who is suggested to struggle with modern technology. Zebra also was briefly revealed to be the father of "Plaid", after dating Virginia the vertically striped zebra, however, Plaid was dropped at the end of the run due to Zebra saying there are a lot of potential fathers out there, until Rat remarks that it "Sounds to [him] that some weasel cartoonist didn't know what to do with the character,".

==== Character history ====
Zebra debuted in the February 4, 2002 strip and was only scheduled to be a limited run character. His debut saw him trying to sell cookies to Rat and Pig to raise money to help save his herd, but Rat declined because of not wanting to mess with natural selection. Reader reaction to Zebra eventually made Pastis decide to make Zebra a permanent character.

=== The Crocodiles ===
The Zeeba Zeeba Eata Fraternity is an all-crocodile fraternity that lives next door to Zebra. They consistently make attempts to kill and eat Zebra but, despite believing themselves to be capable hunters, the crocodiles always undermine their schemes due to their collective stupidity. The crocodiles' plans generally culminate with them killing each other instead; dozens of crocodiles have died over the strip's run. The crocodiles' plans are often elaborate and convoluted, but even so, they never successfully conceal the fact that their ultimate goal is to capture and eat Zebra. Because of their large numbers and short lifespans, most crocodiles do not have individual personalities outside of their schemes.

The crocodiles are known for their distinctive speech pattern; Pastis represents their speech with lowercase letters and phonetic spelling. They also pronounce some words in nonstandard ways, such as referring to Zebra as "zeeba" and themselves as "crockydiles". They often begin scenes with the catch phrase "Hullooo, zeeba neighba!" In describing the origin of the crocodiles' speech, Pastis has stated his "inspiration was probably from a Saturday Night Live skit that had Tarzan and Frankenstein trying to talk [to each other]." More intelligent crocodiles, such as Larry's wife and son, usually speak standard English rather than using the crocodiles' register.

==== Larry, Patty and Junior ====
Larry (born February 16, 1969), his beehive-sporting wife Patty, and their son Junior, are a family of crocodiles who live near Zebra and the Zeeba Zeeba Eata fraternity house. Though "Larry" was originally one of the stock names that Pastis gave to the Zeeba Zeeba Eata crocodiles, he is now largely uninvolved with the fraternity.

Pastis describes Larry as "dumb like Pig, but mean-spirited and rude". They both once tried to run for the political position of "village idiot". Larry is also egotistical and defensive about his hunting abilities; he tries to portray himself as a skilled hunter and provider, but to keep up this impression, he frequently perpetrates schemes such as claiming fast food products to be zebra meat. Larry also holds old-fashioned views on gender roles, which frequently leads to tension in his marriage. Larry is also hostile and dismissive of most authority figures. Despite his negative attitudes toward most people, Larry has sincere love for his son, and the two have a close relationship. Pastis says this could be "his only redeeming feature".

Patty is far more intelligent than Larry, and is very critical of her husband's idiocy and self-centeredness.

Junior is a studious and highly intelligent young crocodile; he is also a pacifist and a vegetarian, as he thinks that killing wildlife is immoral. Junior is often frustrated by his father's stupidity, though he generally receives it in good humor; similarly, Larry is often confused by Junior's pacifist beliefs. In a Christmas story line, Junior was revealed to be dating Zebra's niece and ran away with her, only agreeing to come back if his parents agreed to invite Zebra's family over for Christmas dinner.

Junior has gradually aged over the course of the strip, and is currently a college student.

=== Stephan Pastis ===
(debut: June 1, 2003) – Pastis himself appears self-referentially in many strips as the cartoonist of the strip, usually discussing his experiences as a cartoonist or his childhood and background. His characters' attitudes toward him range from indifference to pity to contempt; Rat is particularly hostile toward him. Pastis particularly tends to offend his characters by writing elaborate pun strips; when forced to utter a convoluted pun, the characters generally follow it up by berating Pastis or inflicting violence upon him.

Pastis often depicts himself as smoking and drinking beer; the real Pastis does not smoke, although he does drink. In The Crass Menagerie, Pastis notes that people have criticized his character for seeming to glamorize smoking, though Pastis states that he intends the smoking to make him look more like a "loser".

The fictionalized version of Pastis split from his wife in 2014; this storyline led to widespread speculation that the real Pastis was going through a divorce, but he has since clarified that he remains married.

=== Guard Duck ===
==== Personality ====
(Debut: March 14, 2005) Guard Duck (formerly known as "Lil Guard Duck") is a violent duck, hired by Pig because the cost of a proper guard dog was too high. Initially simply a violent, sociopathic duck, he later took on the persona of a jaded soldier and mercenary, seeing the world as his battlefield. He frequently blows up the neighbors' property, assuming he is at war against the neighbors, and suggests militaristic solutions for common and simple neighborhood problems. Guard Duck sees Pig as his commander, often referring to him as "sir"; accordingly, Pig is often forced to mitigate Guard Duck's ability to cause damage, typically by locking him in a clothes hamper. Pastis has emphasized that Guard Duck has a predominantly "cool persona" in that, while he is prone to violence, he does not "freak out or panic".

In one storyline, Guard Duck fell in love with a non-anthropomorphic duck named Maura, who flew away from him for the winter and failed to return for over a year. Guard Duck thought he had lost her forever, as he had never learned how to fly, but one day she returned to him. He resigned his "commission" shortly thereafter and traveled to Paris with Maura, but soon afterward, Maura left him to work for Aflac.

Guard Duck frequently collaborates with Zebra's amoral pet cat, Snuffles, to perpetrate criminal schemes and occasional coups d'etat.

=== Minor characters ===
- Pigita (debut: July 22, 2002) – Pig's on-and-off girlfriend, characterized by mood swings in her early appearances. She is frequently frustrated by Pig's immaturity, seeming to wish he would propose to her or make a similar gesture of commitment. They have apparently been dating since September 6, 2000. Pigita frequently dumps Pig and takes him back, although this has been toned down in modern strips.
- Snuffles the Cat (debut: September 30, 2007) — A long-haired cat owned by Zebra. The crocodiles originally gave Snuffles to Zebra, intending for Snuffles to kill him, but the two ended up getting along. Snuffles now occupies his time committing various crimes and assisting in Guard Duck's schemes.
- Comic Strip Censors – The Comic Strip Censors are a group of sophisticated men, recognizable by the labeled top hats they wear, who appear when potentially, but not really, offensive material, such as when Rat sends an e-mail that says "enlarge your pens", is referenced in the comic. Rat frequently makes innuendos to deliberately provoke them.
- Jef the Cyclist (originally Jeff the Cyclist) (debut: June 2, 2009) – A pompous cyclist who sees cyclists, and himself in particular, as inherently superior to all other people. He is rigorously obsessed with fitness, and describes non-cyclists as "commoners" and "scum". Pastis changed the spelling of Jef's name as a reference to Jef Mallett, the cartoonist of Frazz, who is an avid cyclist and a friend of Pastis.
- Angry Bob (debut: September 15, 2002) – A book character created by Rat, Angry Bob is a 39-year-old man who is constantly battling anger problems and attempts to find happiness and inner peace, only to meet a violent death at the end of every story, or suffer some other unfortunate fate, such as being arrested by the TSA at the end of one story. When Goat questions Rat on how Angry Bob's stories continue despite the character dying, Rat shows him the opening line of the new volume he is working on – "Angry Bob undied." – to which Goat replies, "That's the stupidest thing I've ever read." Angry Bob is usually not physically seen in the strip; on rare occasions, he does physically appear, although his face is never shown.
- Danny Donkey (debut: April 16, 2006)– A children's book character created by Rat, he is a misanthropic, alcoholic donkey who hates everybody else and spends most of his time sitting around drinking beer in his underwear, or smoking. On some occasions, his hatred of people will drive him to the point of killing them. Referencing a story-line where a plushie Danny Donkey become alive, Pastis conceived Danny Donkey as "the anti-Hobbes... a stuffed animal who came to life but instead of being kind and wise was drunk and addicted to nicotine."
- Elly Elephant and Henry Hippo – Two book characters created by Rat, they are an elephant and hippopotamus who date each other. Elly has an idealistic, romantic nature, and often finds her idealism betrayed by Henry Hippo's apathetic approach to their relationship, often leading her to retaliate violently against him. Elly debuted first in a solo story written by Rat, and, while usually seen with Henry Hippo, has made a small amount of appearances without Henry since his introduction.
- Neighbor Bob – A bald man who lives next to Rat and Pig. He is frequently mentioned, but is usually only seen in person when he has a dispute with Rat over neighborhood issues. He is most often a victim of Rat's hostility, but if sufficiently provoked, will also respond in kind. Pastis has remarked there is very little continuity between Neighbor Bob's character details.
- Gary, the coffee shop manager (debut: July 10, 2006) – Gary is Rat's long-suffering manager at Joe's Roastery. Powerless to fire Rat due to the cafe's stringent diversity policies, Gary is regularly forced to try to cajole Rat into treating his customers appropriately.
- Andy (debut: June 16, 2007) – A dog who makes big plans for his life, only to have them dashed by the fact he is tied to a pole in his backyard. Despite the repeated crushing of his hopes, Andy retains a hopeful personality. Pastis describes Andy as "a metaphor meant to symbolize how we learn to live with the limitations imposed on us". For a period of time Andy shared the backyard with a female dog named Olive, who like Andy was chained to a post. She left him after her chain broke in the middle of the night. Andy once briefly escaped as well, to visit his dying father in the hospital. Andy and Olive are named for cartoonist Paige Braddock's pet dachshunds.
- Farina (debut: August 19, 2002) – Pig's germophobic sister, who lives in a bubble to limit her exposure to pathogens. She had a romantic relationship with Rat, but left him abruptly. In Sgt. Piggy's Lonely Hearts Club Comic, Pastis said that he only draws her infrequently because her bubble requires a drafting compass to draw.
- Viking Figurines (debut: November 7, 2005) – Pig has miniature Viking figurines that write in diaries and practice non-manly habits. Rat often attempts to push the Vikings into more archetypally Viking lifestyles, through tactics like showing them WWE or singing violent songs.
- Jeffy Keane – (debut: May 12, 2003) – A character from The Family Circus who shows up from time to time in Pearls for various reasons. Pastis often draws him in situations that are antithetical to Jeffy's character such as assaulting Pig or "battling demons". Stephan has joked about suing the Keanes for copyright infringement, due to the amount of time he has used the character.
- Wise Ass on the Hill – He is a wise anthropomorphic ass who gives advice to people who question him. He wears glasses and tends to be terse, sometimes even kicking people off his hill. Rat and Pig normally visit him and ask for advice, getting answers like, "drink beer".
- Max and Zach (debut: May 31, 2007) – Two lions that live next door on the other side to Zebra. Unlike the crocs, they don't try to hunt Zebra, as their wives are the ones who do the hunting. Max and Zach often give Zebra tips in order to survive.
- Alphonse (debut: July 5, 2004) – A needy porcupine who begs for attention, even annoying characters like Pig. He often threatens suicide, which Rat in particular hates.
- Chuckie (debut: December 4, 2002) – A friend of Goat, Chuckie is a non-anthropomorphic sheep who only communicates by saying "Baah".
- Annie May (debut: November 14, 2005) – A sea anemone who wants to kill Pig for unknown reasons. Her name leads to a lot of wordplay in the strip. She eventually is crushed by Rat closing the garage door and splits into two anemones, Annette and Ann O'Meade.
- John and Jennifer (debut: December 13, 2005) – Two seals looking for a safe place to live from predators. Zebra told them that their neighborhood was safe for them as the only predators there were ones he himself had to deal with, however it was quickly found out a Killer Whale lives there as well.
- The Killer Whale (debut: December 13, 2005) – An orca who tries to eat John and Jennifer multiple times, but is unsuccessful. He is killed when he eats a bomb made by Annette and Ann O'Meade that was meant for Pig, but was disposed of by Rat, who baked it into a meatloaf. He frequently comes back to life later, being explained as him "undying".

== Style ==
Artistically, Pearls is simple. Pastis stated, "People say that they like my strip's simplicity, but I'm doing the best I can to just to get up to that level. I'm not dumbing the art down."

Pearls is a meta-comic in that it often satirizes the comics medium, and its characters frequently break the fourth wall. Characters frequently communicate with the author or with characters from other strips. Some strips are based on the premise that the characters live in a comic strip: for example, the strip published on January 14, 2008, had "roof fish" sitting on top of the panel fishing for the characters, and other strips have had smeared newsprint or beer affect the appearance of the strip.

Pearls will often also mock older strips, such as Cathy and The Family Circus. The frequent comedic jabs at long-running comic strips has earned Pastis the disdain of many comic artists, which the author referenced in a storyline where the Pearls cast is not invited to the 75th-anniversary crossover party of Blondie.

Pastis will often employ a shaggy dog story, using a great amount of dialogue to spin an elaborate premise often resolved with a character's unforeseen death or near death. A variation known as a feghoot builds to an intentionally bad pun in the penultimate panel, with the final panel showing the cartoon version of Pastis as the target of criticism, hostility, or even physical violence from the characters, usually Rat.

Pearls uses dark humor, at times involving topics such as death, depression and human suffering.

== Other media ==
In an interview on The Big Idea with Donny Deutsch that aired on February 7, 2008, Pastis mentioned that he had been approached by producers about an animated TV series based on Pearls.

In 2009, a line of Pearls plush dolls was released by Aurora World, Inc., featuring four characters (Rat, Pig, Zebra and Croc) from the comic, to which Pastis jokingly said he would use for reference when unsure how to draw the characters.

On October 20, 2010, RingTales launched their series of animated Pearls strips on Babelgum. Pastis has since begun to release these cartoons on YouTube.

== Books ==
There are over a dozen Pearls Before Swine books, mostly strip collections and treasuries.

== Awards ==
Pastis won the National Cartoonists Society's Division Award for Best Newspaper Comic Strip for Pearls in 2003, 2006 and 2014. He was also nominated for the award in 2002 and 2008.

Pastis was one of the National Cartoonists Society's nominees for Cartoonist of the Year in 2008, 2009, 2010, 2011, and 2012.

Stephan Pastis won the Reuben Award for Cartoonist of the Year for 2018 for his work on Pearls.

== Sources ==
- Pastis, Stephan (August 18, 2009). Pearls Sells Out: A Pearls Before Swine Treasury. Andrews McMeel Publishing. ISBN 9780740773969.
- Pastis, Stephan (March 2, 2003). Pearls Before Swine: BLTs Taste So Darn Good. Andrews McMeel Publishing. pp. 7–8. ISBN 9780740734373.
- Pastis, Stephan (September 25, 2012). Pearls Freaks the #*%# Out: A (Freaky) Pearls Before Swine Treasury. Andrews McMeel Publishing. ISBN 9781449423025.
- Pastis, Stephan (September 2004). Sgt. Piggy's Lonely Hearts Club Comic: A Pearls Before Swine Treasury. Andrews McMeel Publishing. ISBN 9780740748073.
