= Brevity (comic strip) =

- Author(s): Guy Endore-Kaiser & Rodd Perry; Dan Thompson
- Website: www.gocomics.com/brevity
- Current status/schedule: Current Gag-a-day panel
- Launch date: January 3, 2005; 20 years ago
- Syndicate(s): United Feature Syndicate / Andrews McMeel Syndication
- Publisher: Andrews McMeel Publishing
- Genre: humor

Brevity is a single-panel newspaper comic strip created by Guy Endore-Kaiser and Rodd Perry, and currently drawn by Dan Thompson.

== Publication history ==
Brevity originally began on Comics Sherpa (a site which helps beginning comic strips make their work public over the web). Endore-Kaiser cited Gary Larson's The Far Side as an inspiration. The strip was originally intended to be called Cow Tools, in homage to a notorious Far Side cartoon, but the authors were forced to change it after receiving a cease-and-desist letter from lawyers representing Larson. The strip debuted with United Feature Syndicate in 55 newspapers on January 3, 2005. Today, Brevity is published in over 130 newspapers in the US and Canada. There are currently four published collections and one treasury.

In the past few years GoComics.com has allowed visitors to submit comments on each strip.

== Books ==
There are four collections and one treasury published by Andrews McMeel Publishing.

Title	Release date	ISBN
Brevity	September 1, 2006	ISBN 978-0-7407-6042-6
Brevity 2	August 1, 2007	ISBN 978-0-7407-6840-8
Brevity Remix: A Brevity Treasury	June 1, 2008	ISBN 978-0-7407-7228-3
Brevity 3	October 21, 2008	ISBN 978-0-7407-7360-0
Brevity 4	April 21, 2009	ISBN 978-0-7407-7361-7
