= Rip Haywire =

American comic strip by Dan Thompson

- Author: Dan Thompson
- Website: www.gocomics.com/rip_haywire
- Current status/schedule: Current serialized daily strip
- Launch date: (syndication) 5 January 2009; 17 years ago
- Syndicate(s): United Feature Syndicate
- Genre: Adventure

Rip Haywire is an American serial comic strip written and illustrated by North Carolina artist Dan Thompson. It is a comics version of action/adventure entertainment like Indiana Jones, James Bond, and Steve Canyon for the Dilbert generation.

== Publication history ==
United Feature launched the strip in newspapers beginning 5 January 2009.

North Carolina's The Times-News has published the Rip Haywire comic strip since March 2, 2009.

== Main characters ==
There are four main characters: Rip Haywire, his cowardly talking collie TNT, his wife Breezy and his ex-girlfriend Cobra Carson.

In a one strip, they are joined by an orphan kid they dub R.J.

Rip marries Breezy Easy, a young lady with fiery red hair, on August 27, 2016.

In an interview with Times-News, Dan Thompson described his Rip, Cobra and TNT characters as the following:

- Rip Haywire is "a combination of classic action heroes such as James Bond, Indiana Jones and Jason Bourne."
- Cobra Carson is "always out for herself ... She's like all the James Bond girls rolled into one."
- TNT is "the opposite of Lassie."

== Reception ==
According to Madison Taylor, an editor of Times-News, the serial has detractors and fans among the paper readers. Some dislike serials, some desire more humor and less intrigue. Some like it because "it's different than anything else" Times-News publishes and "it's also got an quirky sense of humor."
