= Drabble (comic strip) =

American comic strip by Kevin Fagan

- Author: Kevin Fagan
- Website: https://www.gocomics.com/drabble
- Current status/schedule: Running
- Launch date: March 5, 1979; 47 years ago
- Syndicate: United Feature Syndicate

Drabble is an internationally syndicated comic strip that appears in about 200 newspapers. Kevin Fagan created the strip in 1979 and remains the sole writer and artist. The strip centers on the Drabble family, and is set in a fictionalized version of the greater Los Angeles area.

== Publication history ==
In the mid-1990s, the strip was nearly pulled from the Boston Herald. A grassroots effort, spearheaded by Robert S. Frisiello, Jr. convinced the paper to keep the strip running.

== Characters ==
Ralph: The father of the family, he worked initially as a pro-wrestler, and later as the original mall cop before that mall closed and became a Christmas tree lot. Ralph has been working as a retirement village security guard and in August 2011 began a job as a TSA screener at Polecat International Airport. In 2021, he decided to be a park ranger at Polecat National Park. In 2024, he returned to work at Bulk Club, where he previously worked verifying memberships. His new title was receipt reviewer. He constantly overeats and watches classic movies, and his hero is Ward Cleaver. One strip had him going to the doctor's office to have his cholesterol checked, whereupon the doctor promptly called the Guinness Book of World Records. He has an alter ego as a pro wrestler. He hates ducks for some reason. He is also famous for his "Glare," which strikes fear in just about anyone who looks him in the eye. He has a brother, Fred.

June: The mother of the family and the most responsible one. Always called "Honeybunch" by Ralph. Not without her own faults, Ralph frequently complains about her spending habits and, when he set up a Halloween house of horrors, he included something meant to scare just her-the house telephone with the cord cut. She's shown to be a sci-fi fan and, in one strip, attended a Star Trek convention in costume. She also likes to sing along with her iPod, which Ralph often mistakes for the cat yowling or the smoke alarm going off. She also has the habit of finishing Ralph's sentences, which greatly annoys him. She always wears her apron, even when they go out. In 2018, she started a photography business. She used to work as a flight attendant.

Norman: The sweet, but naive and dim-witted, 19-year-old college student. He's the older son in the family. A bad case of arrested adolescence, he still sleeps on the top of a bunk bed with his younger brother, Patrick, and still asks his father to check the closet for monsters (though, in one strip, he managed to work up the courage to do it himself). In the fall of 2010, however, he moved into a dorm at college. He is also embarrassed about going to the beach because of his farmer's tan and, in one strip, he looked like a farmer driving a tractor. He was also temporarily married to Wendy in Las Vegas, but that marriage was annulled because they were married by someone who was not an ordained Elvis impersonator.

Patrick: The genius younger brother of Norman. He is most frequently dressed in a gi, but for a period of time beginning in early 2018, was almost always dressed in a hockey uniform and carrying around a hockey stick.

Penny: The youngest child of the family.

Wendy Fleetwood: Norman's college classmate. Norman has been trying to score a date with her since the beginning of the comic strip. She was also temporarily married to Norman in Las Vegas, but that marriage was annulled because they were married by someone who was not an ordained Elvis impersonator. A running joke is that she often says "Norman, run!", which makes him flee and allows her to avoid a boring conversation. In the January 25, 2004 strip, it was revealed that her last name is Fleetwood.

No-Neck: A good friend of Ralph, who literally has no neck. He also works as a security guard and is slightly dumber than Ralph.

Neil: College student friend of Norman's.

Stu: Another college student friend of Norman's.

Leonard: Another college student friend of Norman's.

L. Floyd Gargle: a neighbor with a mutual loathing of Ralph.

Wally: The Drabbles' hyperactive dachshund. Wally was introduced in Christmas 1998 when Norman gave Ralph a dog because he couldn't afford something.

Bob: The Drabbles' duck. To protect him from Ralph, Norman and Patrick lie and tell him that Bob is a rare South American parrot who takes on the characteristics of a duck for survival.

Oogie: The Drabbles' cat, who Ralph does not like, but June adores.

George W. Steinbauer: The Drabbles' next-door neighbor who does not like Ralph, and Ralph feels the same way. He and Ralph constantly argue and compete contentiously. Has a daughter named Opal and a son named Troy.

Brtny: A girl at Norman's college who seems to have a crush on him. She communicates through texting. Norman appears to like her, as well.

Echo: A young woman about Norman's age whom he always bumps into when he wishes he could meet the perfect girl. After several false starts, they finally get together. However, she has a pet badger, which contributes to the ill-fated nature of their relationship, since badgers are Wally's mortal enemies. Nicknamed "Echo" for her similarities to Norman, her real name is Norma.

== Books ==
1. The First Book of Drabble 1981
2. Basic Drabble 1983
3. Drabble ...in the Fast Lane 1985
4. Dad, I'm an Elvis Impersonator 1991
5. Son of Drabble 1997
6. Mall Cops, Ducks and Fenderheads 1998
7. Drabblations 1999
8. Who Wants to be a Fenderhead? 2000
