= Health Capsules =

Syndicated comic strip

- Author(s): Michael A. Petti, M.D. (1961–2002); Bron Smith (2002–present)
- Illustrator(s): Jud Hurd (1961–2002)
- Website: www.gocomics.com/healthcapsules
- Current status/schedule: Current single-panel cartoon
- Launch date: February 20, 1961; 64 years ago
- Syndicate(s): United Feature Syndicate
- Genre(s): Humor, Medicine

Health Capsules is a comic strip syndicated by United Feature Syndicate since February 20, 1961. The comic panel answers reader's health-related questions, accompanied by a humorous illustration. Health Capsules is currently produced by Bron Smith.

== Publication history ==
Health Capsules was originally produced by Dr. Michael A. Petti and cartoonist Jud Hurd, beginning in 1961 until 2002, when it was taken over by Bron Smith.

Hurd was awarded the National Cartoonist Society Special Features Award for Health Capsules in 1978.

== Contents ==
GoComics characterizes Health Capsules this way:

Health Capsules was begun as an effort to educate people about common health myths. The feature covers everything from long-established medical facts to the most recent discoveries in medical research. Health Capsules is read by millions in The Times of India and other newspapers across America and abroad. It is translated into Spanish for readers throughout Mexico and South America.

Each comic ends with the caption "Health Capsules is not intended to be diagnostic in nature."
