= Jud Hurd =

American cartoonist

- Born: 1913
- Died: September 14, 2005 (aged 91–92) Westport, Connecticut
- Area: Cartoonist
- Notable works: Health Capsules
- Collaborators: Dr. Michael Petti
- Awards: National Cartoonist Society Special Features Award, 1978
- Spouse: Claudia Hurd (m. 1947)

Jud Hurd (1913 – September 14, 2005) was a syndicated newspaper cartoonist. His work included Ticker Toons and Health Capsules (syndicated by United Feature Syndicate), for which he was awarded the National Cartoonist Society Special Features Award for 1978.

For 36 years he continuously published and edited the quarterly magazine Cartoonist Profiles. Beginning with its premier issue in the winter of 1969 and ending 36 years later with issue 146 in June 2005, three months before his death. He was also active as a political cartoonist.
