= Harvey Mackay =

American businessman and author

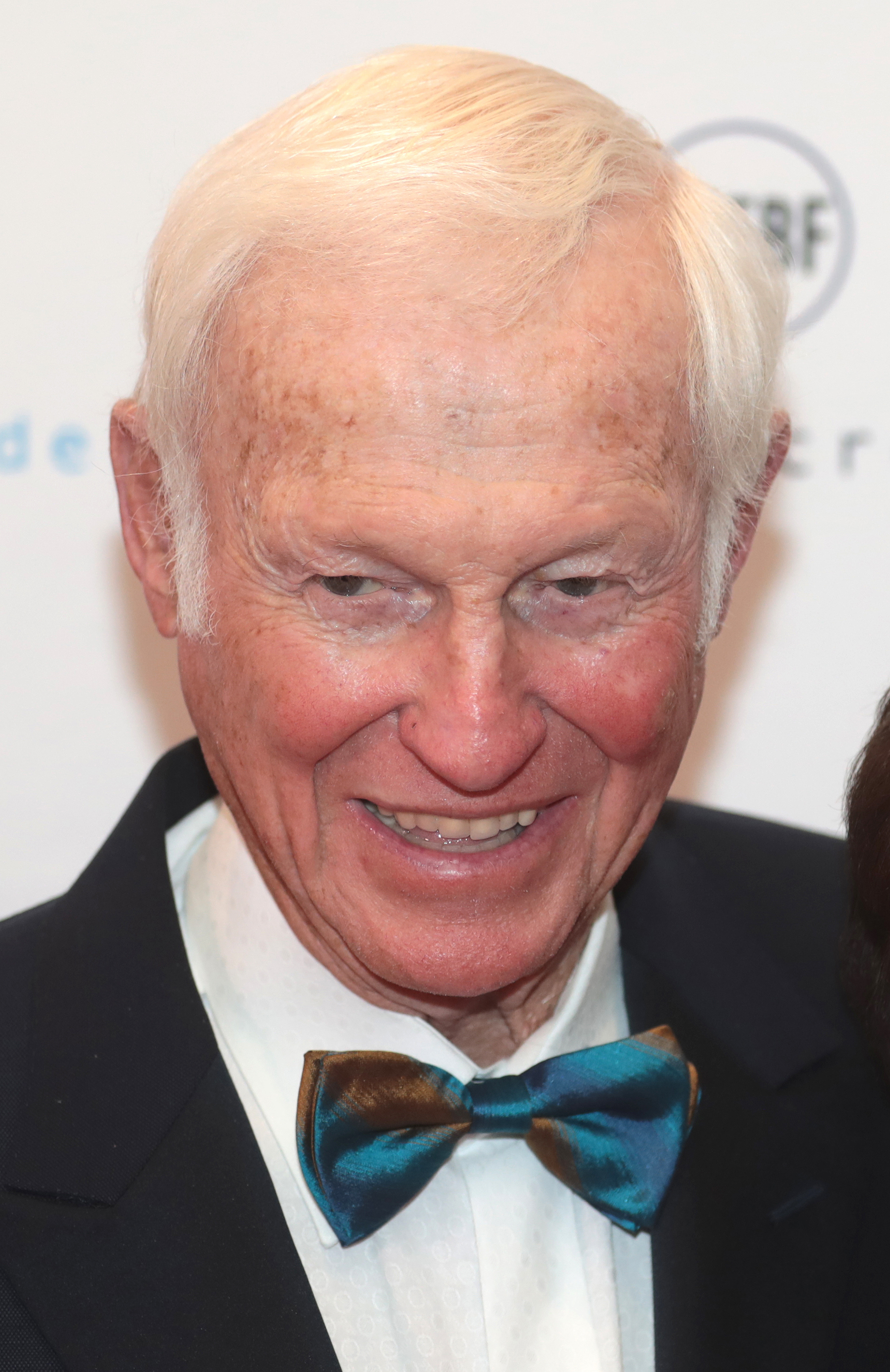
Harvey Mackay in March 2019

Harvey Mackay (born October 24, 1932) is an American businessman, author and syndicated columnist with Universal Uclick. His weekly column gives career and inspirational advice and is featured in over 100 newspapers. Mackay has authored seven New York Times bestselling books, including three number one bestsellers. He is also a member of the National Speakers Association Council of Peers Award for Excellence Hall of Fame.

== Early life ==
Harvey Mackay was born in 1932 in Saint Paul, Minnesota, to Jack and Myrtle Mackay and is the grandson of Russian Jewish immigrants. His father, an Associated Press correspondent, headed AP's Saint Paul office for 35 years. His mother was a substitute schoolteacher. Mackay held jobs from an early age, including selling magazines door-to-door, delivering papers, shoveling snow, and cutting grass. While in high school, Mackay clerked in a men's store during the week and worked as a golf caddy on the weekends.

Mackay graduated from Central High School in Saint Paul, Minnesota in 1950. In 1954, he received a Bachelor of Arts degree in history from the University of Minnesota-Twin Cities where he also lettered in golf. He graduated from the Stanford University Executive Program at the Stanford Graduate School of Business in 1968.

== Career ==
Following his graduation from the University of Minnesota-Twin Cities, Mackay became an envelope salesperson for Quality Park Envelope Company. He also joined Minneapolis’ Oak Ridge Country Club, where he played golf with area businessmen. Mackay became the number one salesperson at Quality Park utilizing the connections he made at the country club. In 1959, he used the proceeds from Quality Park to purchase an insolvent envelope manufacturer with 12 employees.

From 1977 to 1981, Mackay chaired Minnesota's Stadium Task Force, which lobbied for the building of the Hubert H. Humphrey Metrodome. In 1984, Mackay and other Twin Cities business leaders purchased thousands of Minnesota Twins tickets to block owner Calvin Griffith from selling the team to outside investors and relocating it.

In 1985, the Mackay Envelope Company introduced the Photopak, an envelope that holds processed photo prints, and became an industry leader for this product. The company created the MackayMitchell Photopak division, privately owned by Harvey Mackay and Scott Mitchell, and today is the largest North American supplier of photo envelopes. In 2002, MackayMitchell Photopak purchased the photopackaging division of Mailwell Envelope. MackayMitchell Envelope Company employs 500 employees, produces 25 million envelopes a day with sales of $100 million.

In 1988, Mackay wrote his first book, Swim with the Sharks without Being Eaten Alive (William Morrow and Company). It was on The New York Times bestsellers list for 54 weeks and has sold over 5 million copies. Mackay began his public speaking career following the release of Swim with the Sharks. Mackay's second book, Beware the Naked Man Who Offers You His Shirt, was published in 1990 (Ballantine Books) and reprinted in August 1996. It reached number one on The New York Times bestsellers list on February 25, 1990. The New York Times listed both books in its top 15 most motivational books of all time in August 1996.

In 1993, Toastmasters International named Mackay one of its top five speakers in the world. His third book, Dig Your Well Before You’re Thirsty, was published in April 1997 and was a New York Times bestseller for five months. The following year, in December 1998, Ballantine Books published Pushing the Envelope, his fourth New York Times bestseller.

In 2000, Mackay sold Mackay Envelope Company to a management group. He remains an equal partner and chairman of the company. In 2007 the company changed its name to MackayMitchell Envelope Company LLC. Later that year, Ballantine Books released Mackay's fifth New York Times bestseller, We Got Fired! . . . And It’s the Best Thing that Ever Happened to Us. It was Mackay's third book to reach number one on that list.

Portfolio Penguin released his next book, Use Your Head to Get Your Foot in the Door, his sixth New York Times bestseller, in February 2010. The Mackay MBA of Selling in the Real World, his seventh New York Times bestseller, was released in November 2011 by Portfolio Penguin.

Mackay's business thoughts have appeared in Forbes, the Harvard Business Review, Inc. magazine, Reader's Digest, Success magazine, and The Wall Street Journal, among other publications. He started writing a weekly column for United Feature Syndicate in 1993, which is published in major newspapers across the country. Andrews McMeel is now syndicating his column.

He has appeared on various national shows, including Larry King Live, The Oprah Winfrey Show, Good Morning America, Fox and Friends, and The Today Show, among others.

== Civic experience ==
Mackay has been active on 20 boards of directors. Mackay started volunteering with the American Cancer Society in Minnesota, after his mother died from cancer. Eventually, he became the Society's state chairman. Other boards he served on include the Minnesota Orchestra, the Guthrie Theater, the Allina Health Systems, and the Minnesota chapter of the American Heart Association. He was also president of the Minneapolis Chamber of Commerce and the University of Minnesota National Alumni Association. He served for twelve years on the board of Robert Redford's Sundance Institute.

== Awards ==
Mackay received an Honorary Doctor of Laws Degree from Iowa Wesleyan College in 1981. Mackay received the Outstanding Volunteer Fundraising Award in 1982 from the Association of Fundraising Professionals, Minnesota Chapter. In 1989, he was awarded the Minnesota Entrepreneur of the Year Award. He was inducted into the Sales and Marketing Executives International (SMEI) Academy of Achievement in 1990.

He received the Muhammad Ali entrepreneur Award in 1999. He is the winner of the University of Minnesota "M" Club Lifetime Achievement Award.

In 2002, Mackay was elected to the Minnesota Business Hall of Fame by Twin Cities Business. He received the Horatio Alger award in 2004, the Ellis Island Medal of Honor in 2007, and the University of Minnesota Outstanding Achievement Award in 2008. He was named director emeritus of the Minnesota Orchestral Association in December 2013.

== Personal life ==
Mackay resides in the Twin Cities and Paradise Valley, Arizona with his wife Carol Ann. They have three children, David Mackay, Miriam (“Mimi”) Mackay Bartimer, and Joanne (JoJo) Herzig, and 11 grandchildren.

== Bibliography ==
- Harvey Mackay: Swim With the Sharks: Without Being Eaten Alive : Outsell, Outmanage, Outmotivate, and Outnegotiate Your Competition, Ivy Books (March 23, 1988), ISBN 0-8041-0426-3
- Harvey Mackay: The Harvey Mackay Rolodex Network Builder, Mackay Envelope Corp (August 30, 1993), ISBN 0-9637967-0-4
- Harvey Mackay: Sharkproof: Get the Job You Want, Keep the Job You Love... in Today's Frenzied Job Market, HarperBusiness; Reprint (January 1994), ISBN 0-88730-663-2
- Harvey Mackay: Beware the Naked Man Who Offers You His Shirt: Do What You Love, Love What You Do and Deliver More Than You Promise , Piatkus Books (August 27, 1996), ISBN 0-7499-1015-1
- Harvey Mackay: Dig Your Well Before You're Thirsty, Currency Books (February 16, 1999), ISBN 0-385-48546-8
- Harvey Mackay: Pushing the Envelope: How to Be Better, Faster, Smarter and Get the Results You Want in Business and in Life, Vermilion (April 2000), ISBN 0-09-182659-4
- Harvey Mackay: We Got Fired!: And It's the Best Thing That Ever Happened to Us, Ballantine Books (September 28, 2004), ISBN 0-345-47186-5
- Harvey Mackay: Fired Up!: How the Best of the Best Survived and Thrived After Getting the Boot, Ballantine Books (August 30, 2005), ISBN 1-59184-387-1
- Harvey Mackay: Use Your Head To Get Your Foot In The Door: Job Search Secrets No One Else Will Tell You, Penguin Group (February 18, 2010), ISBN 978-1-59184-321-4
- Harvey Mackay: The Mackay MBA of Selling in the Real World, Portfolio Hardcover (November 1, 2011), ISBN 1-59184-387-1
