= Laurie Triefeldt =

Canadian illustrator

Laurie Triefeldt is a Canadian illustrator. She is the creator of World of Wonder, a weekly syndicated newspaper feature that explores a specific topic with detailed illustrations in color. She composes the feature for The Star-Ledger and United Media.

== Biography ==
Triefeldt is a graduate of the Ontario College of Art and the University of Windsor.

Triefeldt started World of Wonder in 1997. The weekly syndicated newspaper feature explores a specific topic in the areas of nature, history, science, and technology with detailed illustrations in color. It is written for children in the 3rd to 8th grade, but is popular among all age groups. She came upon the idea after realizing that the format of the feature filled a gap in newspaper pages between the text articles targeted towards adults and the mostly children-centered cartoons. The feature is created using a computer program, which she taught herself to use as they did not teach computer based art when she was in college.

In 2006, Triefeldt published a collection of her World of Wonder work as a 96 page hardcover book. In 2007, she published two more books, World of Wonder: People & Places and World of Wonder: Plants & Animals with Quill Driver Books. She has published two adult coloring books, with the most recent published in August 2016.

== Awards and honors ==
In 2000, Triefeldt received first place in the Design and Presentation/Graphics category for three pieces she did that year. In 2002, she received second and first place for best Informational Graphic in the Journalism Awards given by the New Jersey Society of Professional Journalists. In June 2006, she received the Distinguished Achievement Award for Excellence in Educational Publishing from the Association of Education Publishers. Later in 2006, she won the Clarion Award from the Association for Women in Communications which she received at the organizations conference in Kansas City. In 2007, she won the National Cartoonists Society Award for Best Newspaper Illustration for World of Wonder.

== Personal life ==
Triefeldt is married to artist Rein Triefeldt. They moved from Canada to the United States in 1989. They live in Trenton, New Jersey.
