= Nancy M. Reichardt =

Nancy M. Reichardt is an American former nationally syndicated newspaper columnist, who wrote for United Feature Syndicate.

Her column, Tune in Tomorrow, was published three times a week in over 200 newspapers across the United States and Canada, and focused exclusively on daytime soap operas. One of the three columns focused on interviews with the stars, one focused on the most memorable storyline on all of the soaps that week, and the most-syndicated column, which appeared in newspapers every Saturday, was a summary of what happened on every soap the previous week.

She first started working on the column in 1976, as an assistant to previous writer Jon-Michael Reed, and has penned the column herself since the late 1980s. Her estimated readership was around 40 million readers a week.

Reichardt announced in her June 27, 2019 column that it would be her last.
