= Betty (comic strip) =

Canadian comic strip

- Author: Gary Delainey
- Illustrator: Gerry Rasmussen
- Website: www.comics.com/betty
- Current status/schedule: current, daily & Sunday
- Launch date: 1991; 35 years ago
- Syndicate(s): United Features Syndicate (1991–2011); Universal Uclick/Andrews McMeel Syndication (2011–present)
- Genre: humor
- Preceded by: Bub Slug

Betty is a Canadian comic strip written by Gary Delainey and drawn by Gerry Rasmussen. The comic was originally distributed by United Features Syndicate, and is now distributed via Andrews McMeel Syndication.

== History ==
Creators Gary Delainey and Gerry Rasmussen first collaborated on the comic strip Bub Slug in 1976. The character of Betty appeared in the strip, but was not seen regularly until 1985, when the Edmonton Journal began running a full-page weekly comic version of Bub Slug. Betty became a stand-alone strip in 1991.

== Characters ==
- Betty: an average woman with a career and a family. A likeable character with a quick wit and a sense of humour.
- Bub: Betty's husband, down-to-earth, caring, fulfills the stereotype of the typical "guy".
- Jr.: Betty's intelligent and sneaky son who has a flair for drama. He loves his cell phone.
- Alex: Betty's friend and co-worker, fulfills a sisterly role for Betty. She has a fairly high position in Betty's old company, and fired Betty in a storyline.
- John: Alex' husband, he's a CEO or similar, well educated and techy, sometimes even nerdy, often lacks a clue on common things.
- Cody: Betty's millennial co-worker at her new tech job.

== Issues covered ==
Betty has covered some issues such as:

- Unemployment. In a 2011-2012 storyline (on/off storyline) Betty was fired from her job and had to find another one.
- Teens. Betty's son, Jr, is a teen with typical teenager issues.
- Diets. Betty is constantly trying new diets and exercise routines, trying to get fit.
- Gluten Free Diet In a 2012 storyline, Betty explored the Gluten Free diet.

== Collected works ==
- Betty ISBN 1-894404-01-7 (Bluefield Books, 1999)
