= Jerry Holbert =

American cartoonist (1958–2022)

Jerry W. Holbert (November 9, 1958 – August 2, 2022) was an American cartoonist best known for his political cartoons. Holbert had a syndicated editorial comic strip. He received the National Cartoonist Society Editorial Cartoon Award for the year 2000.

== Early life ==
Holbert was born in Long Branch, New Jersey on November 9, 1958, and grew up in Middletown Township, New Jersey.

== Career ==
Holbert worked for the Boston Herald newspaper, where he published editorial cartoons. In October 2014, Holbert came under criticism for what many people viewed as a racist depiction of United States President Barack Obama which used the watermelon stereotype: Holbert pictured a White House intruder using the president's bathtub while recommending to Obama the use of watermelon-flavored toothpaste. After negative public reaction, Holbert and the Boston Herald apologized. The nationally syndicated version of the cartoon changed the toothpaste flavor prior to the cartoon's release, but the Herald version was not changed .

== Death ==
In 2015, Holbert began manifesting symptoms of frontotemporal dementia. As a result, he retired from the Herald in 2018, but with his wife's assistance, continued drawing for Andrews McMeel until November 2020. He was formally diagnosed in August 2020.

Holbert died in Derry, New Hampshire on August 2, 2022, at the age of 63.
