= Larry Wright (cartoonist) =

American cartoonist

Larry Wright (February 2, 1940 - May 21, 2017) was an American cartoonist, known for his conservative editorial cartoons published in The Detroit News from 1976 to 2009.

He received the National Cartoonist Society Editorial Cartoon Award for 1980 and 1984. He was also the author of the comic strips Wright Angles and Kit 'N' Carlyle. The latter, about a woman named Kit who owns a cat named Carlyle, was introduced in 1980.

Wright died on May 21, 2017, at the age of 77.
