= Stephan Pastis =

American cartoonist (born 1968)

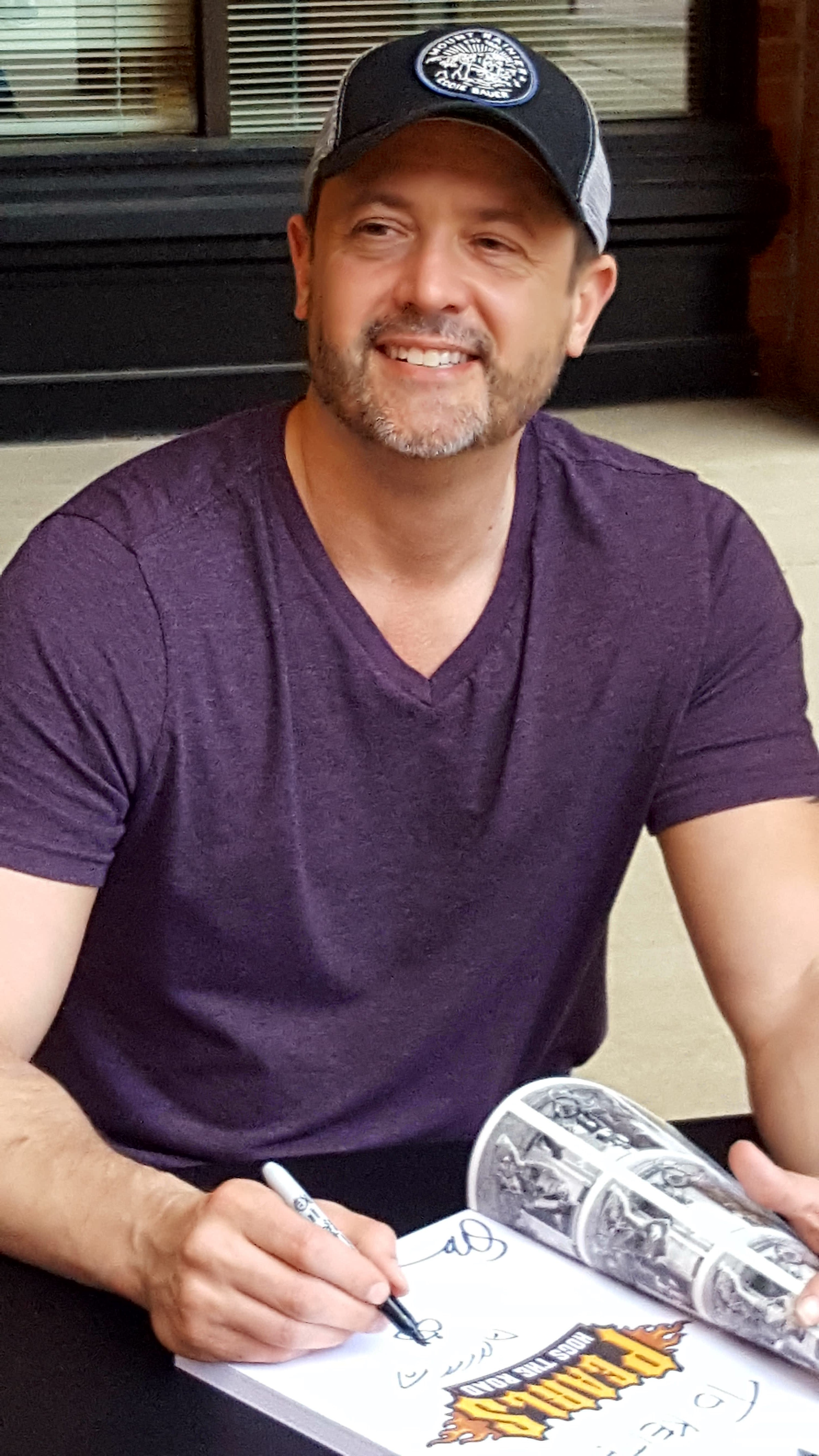
- Pastis in 2017
- Born: Stephan Thomas Pastis; January 16, 1968 (age 58); Los Angeles County, California, U.S.
- Education: University of California, Berkeley (BA); University of California, Los Angeles (JD)
- Occupations: Insurance defense litigation attorney (1993–2002); Cartoonist of the comic strip Pearls Before Swine (2000–present); Author (2003–present)
- Spouse: Staci
- Children: 2
- Website: stephanpastis.wordpress.com

Stephan Thomas Pastis (/ˈstɛfən ˈpæstɪs/ STEF-ən PAS-tiss; born January 16, 1968) is an American cartoonist and former lawyer who is the creator of the comic strip Pearls Before Swine. He also writes children's books, commencing with the release of Timmy Failure: Mistakes Were Made. The seventh book, It's the End When I Say It's the End, debuted at #4 on The New York Times Best Seller list for Children's Middle Grade Books.

== Early life and education ==
The son of Greek immigrants, Pastis was raised in San Marino, California. He started cartooning as a child; his mother brought him pens and paper to amuse him when he was "sick a lot" and had to stay in bed.

He attended the University of California at Berkeley, earning a B.A. in political science in 1989. The next year, Pastis attended law school at UCLA, where he received his J.D. He kept drawing during this time, coming up with the first Pearls Before Swine character, Rat, during what he said was a boring class in law school.

When I wrote for him [Rat] it seemed pretty honest. It was the first character where I could really say what's on my mind. When I put it on paper, it's my voice. So it works for me.

== Early career ==
From 1993 to 2002, Pastis was an insurance defense litigation attorney in the San Francisco Bay area, but he quickly became disenchanted with the legal profession. He did not like its adversarial nature or "the anxiety and tension it produced", so in the mid-1990s he revisited his earlier ambition of becoming a syndicated cartoonist by submitting various concepts to syndication agencies. The Infirm, Rat, Bradbury Road, and others were repeatedly rejected.

== Pearls Before Swine ==
The character Rat from Pastis's earlier strip, Rat, considers himself the king of comics and considers everyone else lesser than him. The character Pig, who is Rat's opposite, had been featured in The Infirm, which was about an attorney who numbered an evil pig farmer among his clients. Although Pastis had developed the characters, they were still just stick figures with jokes. One day in 1996, Pastis drove to an ice rink in Santa Rosa where Charles Schulz, the creator of Peanuts, had his coffee every day. The meeting did not begin auspiciously, as Pastis blurted out: "Hi, Sparky [Schulz's nickname], my name is Stephan Pastis and I'm a lawyer." Schulz turned pale, thinking Pastis was there to serve him with a subpoena. But he recovered, and Pastis remembers Schulz's graciousness:

I was a total stranger to him, and he let me sit down at his table and we talked for an hour. I took a picture with him. He looked at some of the strips that I had been doing and gave me some tips. Man, I was on cloud nine.

In addition to Peanuts, Pastis drew inspiration from Dilbert.

What worked for me personally was to study the writing of Dilbert. I just bought a bunch of Dilbert books and studied how to write a 3-panel strip. Then I showed them to a group of people who were acquaintances (but not quite friends) in order to get their honest assessment of which ones were funny and which ones weren't. As to the ins and outs of getting syndicated, I bought a book called Your Career in the Comics by Lee Nordling.

Pastis drew about 200 strips for the new comic and selected 40 of the best, but fearing more rejection, let them sit on his basement counter for the next two years. Only in 1999, when he visited the grave of a college friend who had been a free spirit and had encouraged him to be the same, did he overcome his fear and submit the strips to three different syndicates, including United Features. United took the unprecedented step of first running the strips on Comics.com to gauge reader response. When Scott Adams, Dilbert's creator, whom Pastis had never met, endorsed the strip, the response "went through the roof".

Pastis also credits Get Fuzzy cartoonist Darby Conley with contributing to the strip's development. They met through their syndication attorney, and Conley taught him how to color the Sunday strips and add gray tones to the dailies, which people call "halftone".

Eight months later, Pastis gleefully quit his law practice. He considers his dissatisfaction with law helpful insofar as "humor is a reaction to and defense against unhappiness", and wanting to leave his job gave him the impetus to create better comic strips so that he could get syndicated.

Fifteen years later, Pearls was still one of the fastest-growing comic strips, appearing in more than 650 newspapers worldwide. Pastis generally works five to nine months ahead of deadline, a rarity in the world of newspaper comics.

In June 2014, Pastis collaborated with Bill Watterson, the creator of Calvin and Hobbes, on a weeklong storyline in which a second-grade girl, Libby, wrote a few of Pastis's cartoon frames for him. Pastis says that collaborating with Bill Watterson is like glimpsing "Bigfoot". After the strips were published, Pastis revealed that the artwork for three of the strips was in fact by Watterson. In the last cartoon of the sequence, Libby explains to Pastis that she will not continue drawing strips, saying, "There's a magical world out there", a reference to the words Calvin speaks in the final strip of Calvin and Hobbes.

=== Treasuries ===
Pastis's first treasury, Sgt. Piggy's Lonely Hearts Club Comic, was published in 2004. In addition to the content of the previous books, BLTs Taste So Darn Good and This Little Piggy Stayed Home, and Sunday strips in full color, Pastis included responses from readers and a section in which he explained why certain strips were not successful, and how he would fix them. He continues to release the treasuries about one every year and a half. Each book in the series is subtitled "A Pearls Before Swine Treasury". Recently, treasuries became the main format for Pearls Before Swine books, retiring the smaller collections.

== Personal life ==
Pastis lives in Santa Rosa, California with his wife Staci and two children. He is on the board of the Charles Schulz Museum, helping with merchandising rights issues and answering questions about Peanuts.

Schulz is to comic strips what Marlon Brando was to acting. It was so revolutionary. Before "Peanuts", the writing was physical, over the top, but Sparky goes inside the soul. His influence on me is enormous. I've taken his backgrounds, the front porch, the beach and the TV beanbag. Rat is Lucy, Goat is Linus and Pig is Charlie Brown. Sparky is a template. Whether or not you know it, he's the template.

In 2011, Pastis cowrote the Peanuts special Happiness Is a Warm Blanket, Charlie Brown.

== Timmy Failure ==
On February 25, 2013, Pastis released his first book aimed at younger readers, Timmy Failure: Mistakes Were Made, from Candlewick Press. Modeled after the popular Diary of a Wimpy Kid series, Timmy Failure follows the exploits of a young detective-to-be and his polar bear friend, Total, as they solve crimes in their neighborhood. A sequel, Timmy Failure: Now Look What You've Done, was released on February 25, 2014. A third book, Timmy Failure: We Meet Again, was released on October 28, 2014. The fourth book, Timmy Failure: Sanitized for Your Protection, was released on October 6, 2015. The fifth, Timmy Failure: The Book You're Not Supposed To Have, was released on September 27, 2016. The sixth, Timmy Failure: The Cat Stole My Pants was released on April 25, 2017, and the seventh, Timmy Failure: It's The End When I Say It's The End, was released in September 2018. A prequel to the series, Zero to Hero ("Volume 0") (2020) is the eighth.

=== Film adaptation ===
In April 2017, Disney started work on a Timmy Failure movie with Tom McCarthy directing and co-writing with Pastis. The film was released on Disney's family-oriented streaming service Disney+ in January 2020 with the titular character being portrayed by Winslow Fegley. The film was shot from July to September 2018 in Portland, Oregon.

== Awards ==
Pastis was nominated for the National Cartoonists Society Newspaper Comic Strip Award for 2002, 2003, 2006, 2007, 2008, and 2014. He won the 2003, 2006, and 2014 awards. He was also nominated for The National Cartoonists Society Reuben Award for Cartoonist of the Year for every year since 2008, winning in 2018.

In 2026, Pastis was a recipient of the Inkpot Award at the annual San Diego Comic Con.
