= Henry Payne (cartoonist) =

American cartoonist

- Born: 1962 (age 63–64); Charleston, West Virginia US
- Education: Princeton University
- Known for: Cartoonist
- Notable work: Payne & Ink (2002 book)
- Spouse: Talbot
- Children: 2
- Website: Henry Payne

Henry Payne (born 1962 in Charleston, West Virginia) is an American editorial cartoonist for The Detroit News. He also writes articles for the National Review. In 1987, Payne was a finalist for a Pulitzer Prize in Editorial Cartooning, and he won the Society of Professional Journalists' Excellence in Journalism Award in 2019 and 2022.

Payne is the author of the 2002 Payne & Ink.

== Early life ==
Payne was born in 1962 in Charleston, West Virginia. His father, Henry Payne III, ran the family business Payne Engineering. Payne began cartooning when he was a student at Princeton University, drawing for two of its student publications, The Daily Princetonian and The Nassau Weekly. He graduated from Princeton University in 1984.

== Career ==
After graduating with a degree in history, Payne was hired by Charleston Daily Mail as their staff artist. In 1986, he moved to Washington D.C., working for Scripps Howard News Service as an editorial cartoonist and an editor for its cartoon wire. His cartoons were available though the Associated Press syndication services. Detroit News hired Payne in 1999 as their cartoonist, replacing Draper Hill, who retired from the paper.

Payne's cartoons are syndicated by Andrews McMeel Syndication. In addition to his editorial cartoons, Payne also writes columns for various conservative publications, including the National Review and the Weekly Standard. Payne is known for his libertarian views, he has criticized the mainstream media as corrupt, and is an outspoken critic of what he claims to be corruption in global warming reporting. In 1987 he was nominated for a Pulitzer Prize in Editorial Cartooning. He was a finalist for the award and finished as runner up to Berkeley Breathed of The Washington Post Writers Group. Payne won the Society of Professional Journalists' Excellence in Journalism Award, first place for car reviews in 2019 and 2022.

Payne is a writer and he authored a book titled Payne & Ink and he describes it as "An anthology of cartoons and articles by editorial cartoonist and writer Henry Payne". He also illustrated two children's books. “Where did Daddy’s Hair Go?" by Joe O'Connor, and Dr. Seuss' "The Ear Book" by Al Perkins.

In September 2024, Payne was accused of racism by U.S. politicians after he depicted Rashida Tlaib, a Palestinian American congresswoman, next to a pager exploding days after such devices detonated across Lebanon.

== Personal life ==
Payne lives in Bloomfield Hills, Michigan, with his wife, Talbot, and two children.
