= Paige Braddock =

American cartoonist

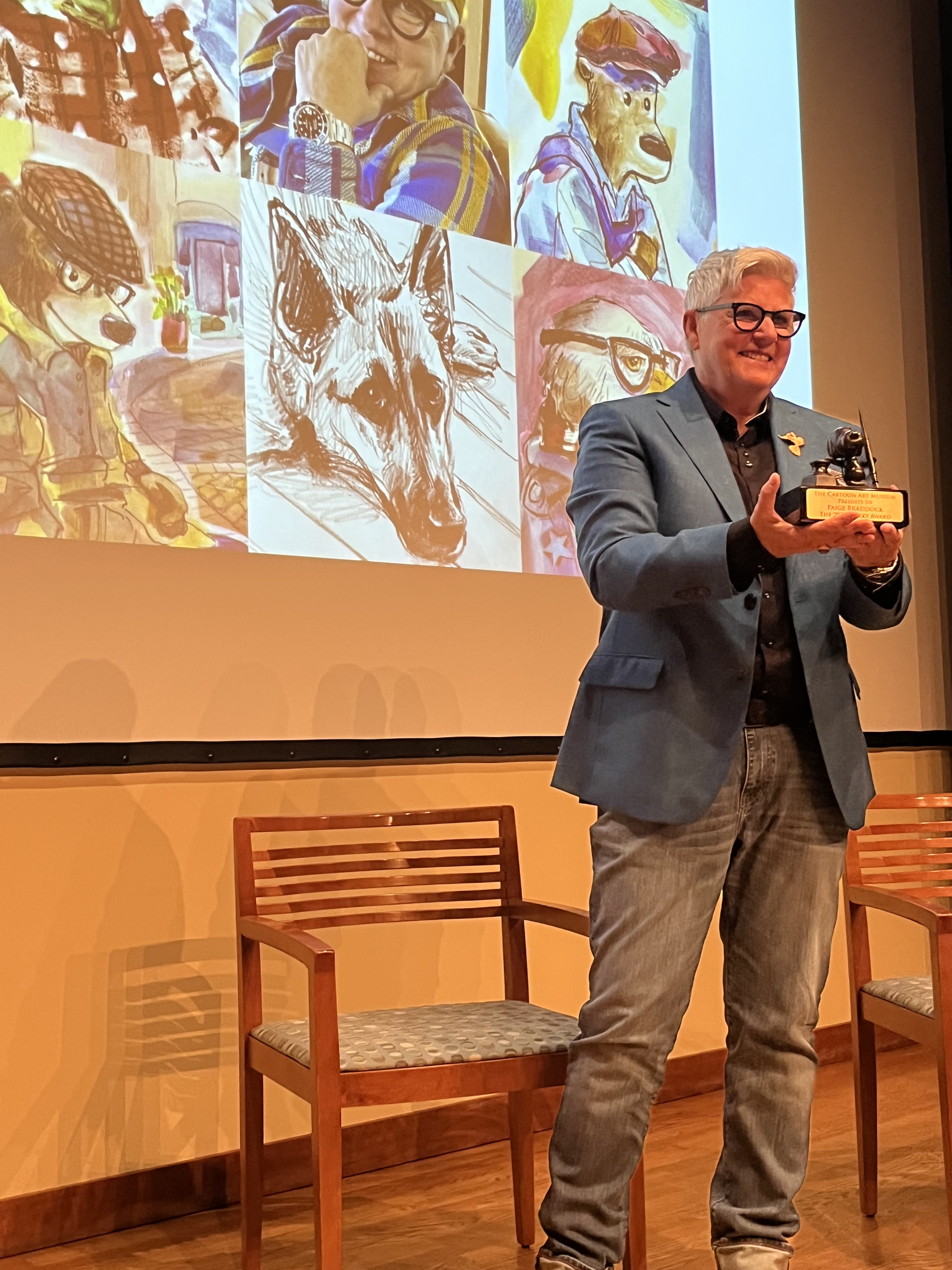
- Paige Braddock winning the Sparky Award in 2025
- Born: Bakersfield, California, United States
- Occupations: Cartoonist, author
- Known for: Jane's World comic strip

Paige Braddock is an American cartoonist best known for her Eisner-nominated comic strip, Jane's World, the first gay-themed comic work to receive online distribution by a national media syndicate in the U.S. Braddock concluded the comic strip after completing its 20-year run in 2018.

== Early life ==
Braddock was born in Bakersfield, California. She spent most of her childhood years in Mississippi. Due to her father's job as a forester, Braddock and her family moved frequently across the country. By the time she reached high school in Brevard, North Carolina, they had moved 17 times.

== Career ==
Braddock decided at the age of 7 that she wanted to be a cartoonist. She published her first cartoon, "Bart Winkle," in her junior year of high school in the local newspaper, The Transylvania Times. Cartoonist Dave Graue of the comic strip "Alley Oop" lived in the area and served as her mentor.

Braddock earned a Bachelor of Fine Arts degree from the University of Tennessee in Knoxville in 1985. Early in her career she worked as an illustrator for several newspapers, including The Orlando Sentinel, The Chicago Tribune, and The Atlanta Constitution.

Braddock began crafting her long-standing comic, Jane's World, in 1991. In 2006, she received an Eisner Award nomination for best humor book for her work on the comic. Braddock published the first novel inspired by the comic series, Jane's World: The Case of the Mail Order Bride, in June 2016 with LGBTQ publisher Bold Strokes Books. An anthology spanning 20 years of the comic, Love Letters to Jane's World, was released by Lion Forge Comics in August 2018. In 2019 it was selected as a Lambda Literary finalist for best LGBTQ graphic novel. Installments of the comic strip can continue to be found at GoComics.

In 1999, Braddock became the Creative Director at Charles M. Schulz Creative Associates, Schulz's studio in Northern California. In 2018, Braddock assumed the position of Chief Creative Officer and in this role is charged with overseeing the visual and editorial direction for all Peanuts licensed products worldwide. The Schulz studio works in tandem with the licensing office in New York, Peanuts Worldwide. As a professional cartoonist, she has illustrated several Peanuts children's books. The Snoopy U.S. postage stamp issued in April 2001 was designed by Braddock. In 2022, she delivered the dedication of the commemorative centennial Schulz stamp at the issuance ceremony. She also won a Children's & Family Emmy Award for her work on the Apple documentary, "Who Are You, Charlie Brown?" which won for outstanding nonfiction program that same year. After more than 25 years of leadership, Braddock became Creative Director Emeritus in 2025. She was also awarded the Sparky Award by the Cartoon Art Museum and the Charles M. Schulz Museum and Research Center at a cartoon-a-thon celebrating her career in comics that same year.

Throughout Braddock's career as a cartoonist, she has published a diverse collection of comic works. In 2008, Braddock co-created the science fiction graphic novel series The Martian Confederacy with writer Jason McNamara. In 2015, she began publishing a line of graphic novels for children with Andrews McMeel Publishing. There are currently three books in the Stinky Cecil series. Her other graphic novels for children include the series, Peanut, Butter, & Crackers with Penguin Kids. New editions of the Peanut, Butter, & Crackers series are now available in the UK, Italy, Greece, and in Arabic by publisher Nosy Crow.

In 2023, Braddock served as the commencement speaker for Montserrat College of Art and received an honorary doctorate in fine arts from the college.

== PB9 Comics/Girl Twirl Comics ==
PB9 Comics serves as the hub for all of Paige Braddock's independent comics. In 2001, Braddock launched her own publishing company, Girl Twirl Comics, to make Jane's World available in comic shops and bookstores. In 2008, Girl Twirl Comics published Volume 1 of The Martian Confederacy graphic novel series. Volume 2 in the series was published in 2011.

== As Missouri Vaun ==
In 2015, Paige Braddock began writing lesbian romance novels with publisher Bold Strokes Books under the pen name, Missouri Vaun.

Vaun won two Golden Crown Literary Society awards in 2019. Love at Cooper's Creek won a contemporary romance award and Proxima Five won an award in the science-fiction category.

== Personal life ==
Braddock and her wife, Evelyn, live in Northern California.

== Selected works ==
Jane's World

- Jane's World, Volume 1, Girl Twirl Comics, 2003
- Jane's World, Volume 2, Girl Twirl Comics, 2004
- Jane's World, Volume 3, Girl Twirl Comics, 2005
- Jane's World, Volume 4, Girl Twirl Comics, 2006
- Jane's World, Volume 5, Girl Twirl Comics, 2006
- Jane's World, Volume 6, Girl Twirl Comics, 2006
- Jane's World, Volume 7, Girl Twirl Comics, 2007
- Jane's World, Collection 1 (first 15 issues), Girl Twirl Comics, 2007
- Jane's World, Volume 8, Girl Twirl Comics, 2008
- Jane's World, Volume 9, Girl Twirl Comics, 2009
- Jane's World, Volume 10, The New Frontier, Girl Twirl Comics, 2011
- Jane's World, Volume 11, Girl Twirl Comics, 2014
- Jane's World: The Case of the Mail Order Bride, Bold Strokes Books, 2016
- Love Letters to Jane's World, Lion Forge, 2018

Peanut, Butter, & Crackers

- Puppy Problems, Penguin Kids, 2020
- Fetch!, Penguin Kids, 2021
- On the Trail, Penguin Kids, 2022
- Puppy Problems, Nosy Crow, 2023
- River Rescue, Nosy Crow, 2023
- Doggy School, Nosy Crow, 2023

Stinky Cecil

- Stinky Cecil in Operation Pond Rescue, Andrews McMeel Publishing, 2015
- Stinky Cecil in Terrarium Terror, Andrews McMeel Publishing, 2016
- Stinky Cecil in Mudslide Mayhem, Andrews McMeel Publishing, 2018

The Martian Confederacy

- The Martian Confederacy, Volume 1, with Jason McNamara, Girl Twirl Comics, 2008
- The Martian Confederacy, Volume 2, with Jason McNamara, Girl Twirl Comics, 2011

Anthology Contributions by Paige Braddock

- Love is Love, by Marc Andreyko, IDW, DC Entertainment, 2017
- Femme Magnifique: 50 Magnificent Women Who Changed the World, by Shelly Bond, IDW, 2018

Author Contributions by Paige Braddock

- Posie the Pika, art by Blythe Russo, Epic, 2022
- Posie the Pika: Mallory Spreads Her Wings, art by Blythe Russo, Epic, 2022
- Posie the Pika: Chiko's New Home, art by Blythe Russo, Epic, 2023

Missouri Vaun

- The Time Before Now, Bold Strokes Books, 2015
- The Ground Beneath, Bold Strokes Books, 2015
- All Things Rise, Bold Strokes Books, 2015
- Whiskey Sunrise, Bold Strokes Books, 2016
- Valley of Fire, Bold Strokes Books, 2016
- Death By Cocktail Straw, Bold Strokes Books, 2016
- One More Reason to Leave Orlando, Bold Strokes Books, 2016
- Smothered and Covered, Bold Strokes Books, 2017
- Privacy Glass, Bold Strokes Books, 2017
- Birthright, Bold Strokes Books, 2017
- Crossing the Wide Forever, Bold Strokes Books, 2017
- Love at Cooper's Creek, Bold Strokes Books, 2018
- Take My Hand, Bold Strokes Books, 2018
- Proxima Five, Bold Strokes Books, 2018
- Spencer's Cove, Bold Strokes Books, 2019
- Chasing Sunset, Bold Strokes Books, 2019
- The Sea Within, Bold Strokes Books, 2020
- The Mandolin Lunch, Bold Strokes Books, 2020
- Slow Burn, Bold Strokes Books, 2022
- Forever's Promise, Bold Strokes Books, 2023

Anthology Contributions by Missouri Vaun

- Absolute Power: Tales of Queer Villainy!, by Erica Friedman, Northwest Press, 2016
- Girls Next Door, by Sandy Lowe and Stacia Seaman, Bold Strokes Books, 2017
- The Lonely Hearts Rescue, with Nell Stark and Morgan Lee Miller, Bold Strokes Books, 2022

== See also ==
- List of female comics creators
- List of feminist comic books

== Further reading & viewing ==
- Former Schulz Studio Head Paige Braddock Honored with Sparky Award, by Ollie Kaplan, Comics Beat, May 7, 2025
- Braddock: 2025 Sparky Award Recipient, video by The Charles M. Schulz Museum, April 19, 2025
- Why We Love Graphic Novels, by Paige Braddock, Teen Librarian Toolbox at School Library Journal, July 12, 2022
- 'You Could Stand Up a Little Taller': An Interview with Paige Braddock, by Alex Dueben, The Comics Journal, May 21, 2019
- 'Love Letters to Jane's World' by Paige Braddock, by Tara Scott, Lambda Literary, November 14, 2018
- "'Jane's World' Goes Out With a Marriage", by George Gene Gustines, The New York Times, October 19, 2018
- "Paige Braddock Shares Love Letters to Jane's World in Unique Retrospective,"" by Chris Arrant, Newsarama, August 3, 2018
- "Get an Inside Look at the Making of the Peanuts," video by Threadless, February 23, 2015.
- "Stinky Cecil in Operation Pond Rescue Review" , by Brian Cronin, Comic Book Resources, February 6, 2015.
- "Review: Stinky Cecil in Operation Pond Rescue", by Esther Keller, School Library Journal, January 15, 2015.
- "Gallery of Geek: Paige Braddock", by Brian Andersen, The Advocate, September 11, 2014.
- "San Diego COMIC-CON 2013: Paige Braddock on the power of 'Peanuts' – and LGBTQ storytelling in 2013", by Michael Cavna, Washington Post, July 19, 2013.
- "Women in Comics – Paige Braddock," Girls Read Comics Too, January 21, 2012.
- "10 years in 'Jane's World': An interview with Paige Braddock", AfterEllen.com, December 21, 2011.
- "Paige Braddock's 'Jane's World'", video by The Press Democrat, April 12, 2009.
