= 2005 in webcomics =

Notable events of 2005 in webcomics.

== Events ==
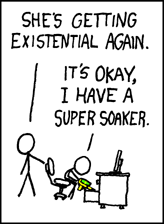
Randall Munroe's stick-figure webcomic xkcd has grown in popularity since its launch in 2005.

- Clickburg, the first webcomic exhibition, was held in the Netherlands.
- The Eisner Awards, the most prestigious comics ceremony, introduced a "Best Digital Comic" category.
- Joey Manley launches Webcomics Nation, a hosting and automation service for webcomics.
- Naver Corporation launched WEBTOON in South Korea, as Line Webtoon.
- The first edition of blog BD festival Festiblog was held in Paris.
- Uclick launches online comic distribution portal GoComics.
- The business model of Modern Tales changed drastically, incorporating an online advertising strategy, effectively making all archives freely available.

=== Awards ===
- Web Cartoonist's Choice Awards, "Outstanding Comic" won by John Allison's Scary Go Round.
- Clickburg Webcomic Awards, won by Han Hoogerbrugge, Jean-Marc van Tol, and Geza Dirks.
- Ignatz Awards, "Outstanding Online Comic" won by Nicholas Gurewitch's The Perry Bible Fellowship.
- Eisner Awards, "Best Digital Comic" won by Brian Fies' Mom's Cancer.
- Eagle Awards, "Favourite Web-Based Comic" won by Scott Kurtz's PvP.

=== Webcomics started ===
- January 1 — Le blog de Frantico by Frantico
- January 12 — Courting Disaster by Brad Guigar
- January 17 — Shortpacked! by David Willis
- January 24 — Aoi House by Adam Arnold and Shiei
- January 26 — Cyanide & Happiness by Kris Wilson, Rob DenBleyker, Matt Melvin, and Dave McElfatrick
- February 2–July 28 — Salamander Dream by Hope Larson
- February 6–April 15 — Magical Adventures in Space by Jeffrey Rowland
- February 21 — Boots and Pup by John Yuskaitis
- March — Inherit the Earth by Allison Hershey
- April 4 — Gunnerkrigg Court by Tom Siddell
- April 18 — Girl Genius by Phil Foglio and Kaja Foglio
- April 26 — Whispered Apologies by various authors
- May 1 — Concerned: The Half-Life and Death of Gordon Frohman by Christopher C. Livingston
- May 1 — TIN The Incompetent Ninja by David Stanworth
- May 23 — Starslip Crisis by Kristofer Straub
- May 23 — Ugly Hill by Paul Southworth
- May 30 — Evil Inc. by Brad Guigar
- June 1 — Happy Hour by Jim Kohl and Phil Kriser
- June 5 — Templar, Arizona by Spike Trotman
- June 8 — Dresden Codak by Aaron Diaz
- June 26 — Goblins by Tarol Hunt
- June — Timing by Kang Full
- July 4 — Wally and Osborne by Tyler Martin
- July 10 — Multiplex by Gordon McAlpin
- August — Crying Macho Man by Jose Cabrera
- September 29 — xkcd by Randall Munroe
- November 17 — Dueling Analogs by Steve Napierski
- November 30 — Raruto by Jesús García Ferrer (JesuLink)
- December 9 — Sam & Max by Steve Purcell
- ¡Eh, tío! by Sergio S. Morán
- Finder by Carla Speed McNeil
- Jesus and Mo by Mohammed Jones

=== Webcomics ended ===
- Argon Zark! by Charley Parker, 1995 – 2005
- Roomies! by David Willis, 1997 – 2005
- Greystone Inn by Brad Guigar, 2000 – 2005
- Buttercup Festival by Elliot G. Garbauskas, 2002 – 2005
- Queen of Wands by Aeire, 2002 – 2005
