= 2000 in webcomics =

- Years in webcomics: 1997 1998 1999 2000 2001 2002 2003
- Centuries: 20th century · 21st century · 22nd century
- Decades: 1970s 1980s 1990s 2000s 2010s 2020s 2030s
- Years: 1997 1998 1999 2000 2001 2002 2003

Notable events of 2000 in webcomics.

== Events ==
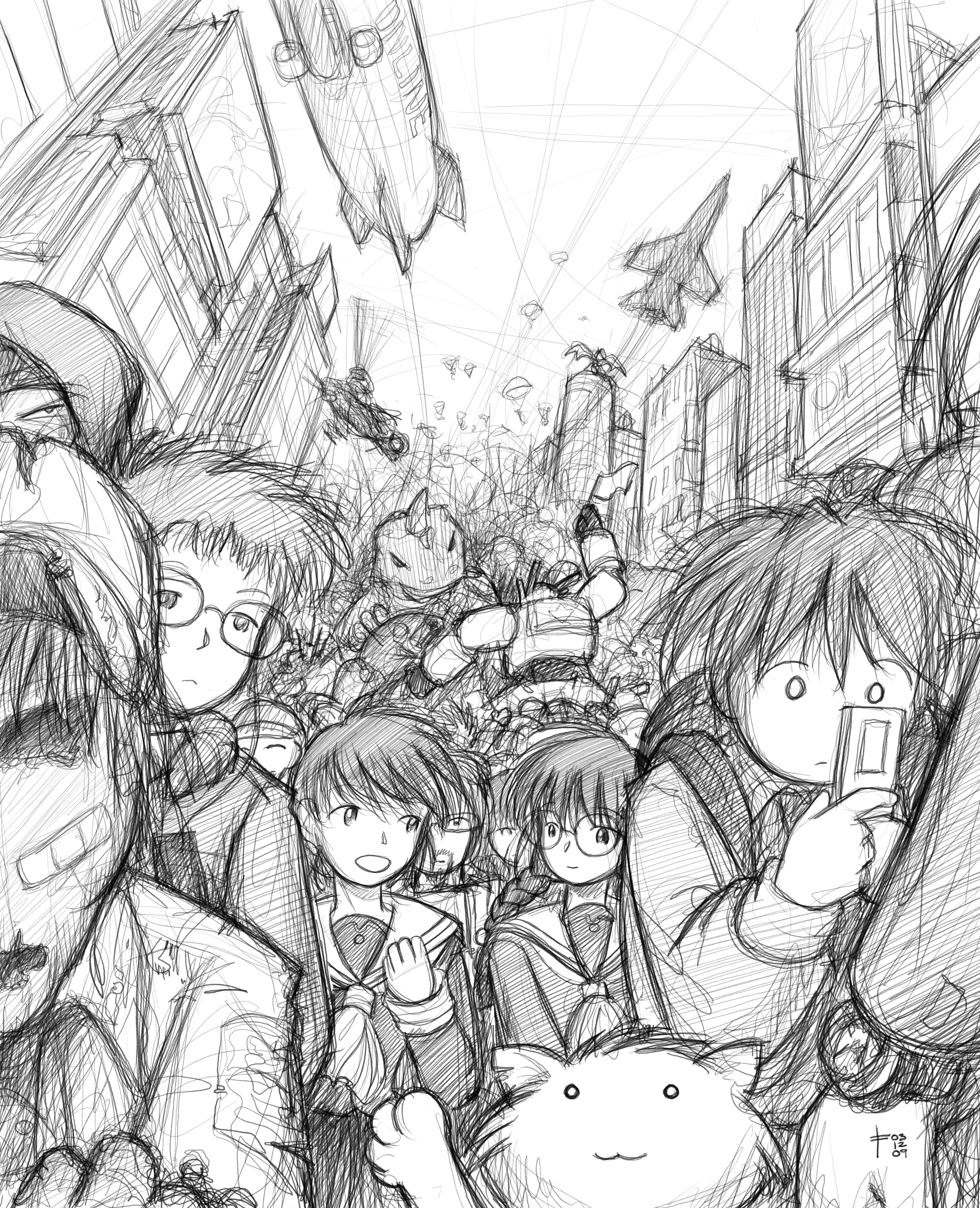
Fred Gallagher's Megatokyo has been running since 2000.

- Webcomic portal Keenspot is founded.
- Scott McCloud's Reinventing Comics was published on July 25.

=== Webcomics started ===
- January 9 — explodingdog by Sam Brown
- January 17 — Sinfest by Tatsuya Ishida
- February 14 — Greystone Inn by Brad Guigar
- February 17 — Buttercup Festival by David Troupes
- April 1 — Bob and George, by David Anez
- April — Diesel Sweeties by Richard Stevens
- April — Lethargic Lad by Greg Hyland switched from print to web
- June 12 — Schlock Mercenary by Howard Tayler
- June 19 — Chugworth Academy by Dave Cheung and Jamal Joseph Jr.
- July 10 — GU Comics by Woody Hearn
- July 27 — Bee by Jason Little
- July 31 — Narbonic by Shaenon K. Garrity
- July — Rogues of Clwyd-Rhan by Reinder Dijkhuis switched from Dutch to English
- August 14 — The Joy of Tech by Liza Schmalcel and Bruce Evans
- August 14 — Megatokyo by Fred Gallagher and Rodney Caston
- August 27 — RPG World by Ian J
- September 20 — The Pain – When Will It End? by Tim Kreider
- October 20 — Sosiaalisesti rajoittuneet (Socially Challenged) by Pekka Piira, Ossi Mäntylahti, and Jukka Piira
- November 10 — Checkerboard Nightmare by Kristofer Straub
- December 20 — Yahtzee Takes On The World! by Yahtzee Croshaw
- Dork Tower by John Kovalic switched from print to web
