= 2004 in webcomics =

Notable events of 2004 in webcomics.

== Events ==
- The Double Fine Comics collaboration is launched in February 2004.
- Online retailer of webcomic-related merchandise TopatoCo is established by Jeffrey Rowland.
- Publisher Seven Seas Entertainment is founded by Jason DeAngelis.
- The Penny Arcade Expo was held for the first time, in Bellevue, Washington.

=== Awards ===
- Web Cartoonist's Choice Awards, "Outstanding Comic" won by two comics: Adrian Ramos's Count Your Sheep, and Mike Krahulik and Jerry Holkins's Penny Arcade.
- Ignatz Awards, "Outstanding Online Comic" won by James Kochalka's American Elf.

=== Webcomics started ===
- January 1 — XQUZYPHYR & Overboard by August J. Pollak
- January 18 — Powerpuff Girls Doujinshi by Vinson Ngo
- April 2 — New Gold Dreams by R. K. Milholland
- May 5 — Smile by Raina Telgemeier
- June 4 — Town Called Dobson by Storm Bear
- June 7 — Little Dee by Christopher Baldwin
- June 25 — Candi by Starline Xiomara Hodge
- June — 319 Dark Street by David Wade
- July 5 — Rob and Elliot by Clay and Hampton Yount
- July 15 — A Lesson Is Learned But The Damage Is Irreversible by David Hellman and Dale Beran
- July — Bouletcorp by Boulet
- July 15 — Spamusement! by Steven Frank
- August 3 — The Adventures of Dr. McNinja by Christopher Hastings
- September 29 — Girls With Slingshots by Danielle Corsetto
- December 12 — Grim Tales from Down Below by Vinson Ngo
- December 31 — Sokora Refugees by Semaui and Melissa Dejesus
- December — Stuff Sucks by Liz Greenfield
- Adventure Log by Scott Ramsoomair
- Alien Loves Predator by Bernie Hou
- Arbit Choudhury by Shubham Choudhury and Hemantkumar Jain
- Canadiana: the New Spirit of Canada by Sandy Carruthers, Jeff Alward, and Mark Shainblum
- Chikan Otoko by Takuma Yokota
- I Drew This by D. C. Simpson
- Mom's Cancer by Brian Fies

=== Webcomics ended ===
- It's Walky! by David Willis, 1999 – 2004
- The Morning Improv by Scott McCloud, 2001 – 2004
- Demonology 101 by Faith Erin Hicks, 2002 – 2004
