= 2002 in webcomics =

Notable events of 2002 in webcomics.

== Events ==
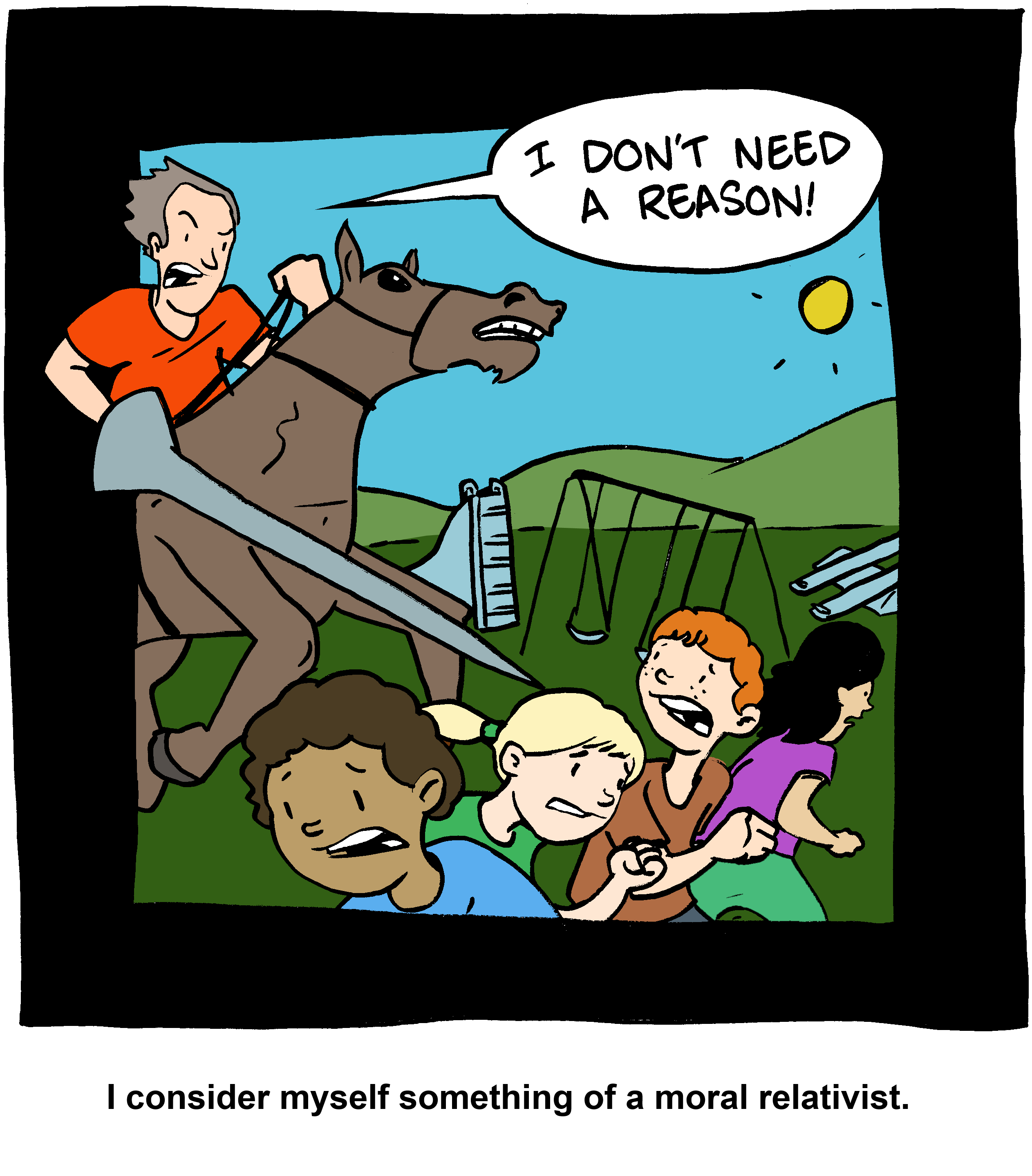
Zach Weinersmith's Saturday Morning Breakfast Cereal went through three different incarnations in 2002 before reaching its current rendering.

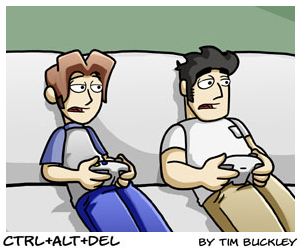
Tim Buckley's Ctrl+Alt+Del has been running since 2002.

- Website Modern Tales launches on March 2.
- Cool Beans World ceased operation in May.
- Jenny Everywhere, the first open source super hero, was conceived on Barbelith discussion boards.
- David Stenworth launches the Snafu Comics website.

=== Awards ===
- Web Cartoonist's Choice Awards, "Best Comic" won by Fred Gallagher & Rodney Caston's Megatokyo.
- Ignatz Awards, "Outstanding Online Comic" won by Jason Little's Bee.

=== Webcomics started ===
- January 17 — ArtBomb anthology by Warren Ellis, Colleen Doran, Andi Watson, Laurenn McCubbin and D'Israeli
- January 28 — Saturday Morning Breakfast Cereal by Zach Weiner
- January — Buttercup Festival by Elliot G. Garbauskas
- February 14 — Van Von Hunter by Mike Schwark and Ron Kaulfersch
- February 15 — PartiallyClips by Rob Balder
- February 16 — Unshelved by Bill Barnes and Gene Ambaum
- February 25 — Nothing Nice To Say by Mitch Clem
- February — Saturnalia by Nina Matsumoto
- March 7 — Oh My Gods! by Shivian Balaris
- March 11 — Pibgorn by Brooke McEldowney
- April — Copper by Kazu Kibuishi
- May 5 — Snafu Comics by David Stanworth
- May 12 — American Elf by James Kochalka
- June 4 — Scary Go Round by John Allison
- June 14 — Pixel by Chris Dlugosz
- July 1 — Wigu by Jeffrey Rowland
- August 5 — Theater Hopper by Tom Brazelton
- September 17 — NatalieDee by Natalie Dee
- October 23 — Ctrl+Alt+Del (webcomic) by Tim Buckley
- November 1 — Day by Day by Chris Muir
- December 8 — Fuzzy Knights by Noah J. D. Chinn
- December — Demonology 101 by Faith Erin Hicks
- December — Elsie Hooper by Robert D. Krzykowski
- Dicebox by Jenn Manley Lee
- Gods of Arr-Kelaan by Chuck Rowles
- Red String by Gina Biggs

=== Webcomics ended ===
- Bobbins by John Allison, 1998 – 2002
- Yahtzee Takes On The World! by Yahtzee Croshaw, 2000 – 2002
