= Office humor =

Humor within a workplace environment

Office humor, also often called workplace comedy, is humor within the workplace, particularly in the office environment. It is a subject that receives significant attention from students of industrial and organizational psychology and of the sociology of work, as well as in popular culture.

== Academic considerations ==
Humor is an inevitable part of the social environment of work, and has been argued to be a potential tool for improving worker satisfaction and organizational results. Studies have suggested that humor can increase worker cohesiveness, creativity, motivation, persistence and resilience in the face of adversity.

On the other hand, workplace humor (especially negative humor) can also be misused to reinforce bigotry, denigrate minorities, create an atmosphere of physical or sexual harassment, or as a management tool to reinforce managerial authority.

An important consideration for the effect of humor is the source. While humor can help a person at work deal with stresses some research has shown that humor from others can cause more stress, even when intended to help a person cope.

== Legal considerations ==
Inappropriate workplace humor may be deemed as "evidence in sexual harassment, discrimination and hostile work environment cases". It has led to serious consequences in cases such as the Krull case, where the ombudsman of King County, Washington was fired for sending a copy of the 1894 booklet Instruction and Advice for the Young Bride to his soon-to-be-married assistant, or Chevron Corporation having to pay more than $2 million as a settlement with four employees after an interoffice email circulated on the subject of "25 Reasons Why Beer is Better Than Women".

== Representations in popular culture ==
Office humor is the focus of comic strips (Dilbert, Gaus Electronics, Help Desk, Misaeng, User Friendly, Sosiaalisesti rajoittuneet), movies (Office Space, Head Office), TV series (Abbott Elementary, Parks and Recreation, Mythic Quest, Brooklyn Nine-Nine, The Office, 30 Rock, Superstore, St. Denis Medical, Severance) and contemporary art (as in works by Mike Kelley).
