= Pibgorn =

Pibgorn may refer to:

- Pibgorn (instrument), a Welsh musical instrument of the hornpipe family
- Pibgorn (webcomic)
