= 2001 in webcomics =

Notable events of 2001 in webcomics.

== Events ==
- Phil and Kaja Foglio's Girl Genius launched in print.
- The Web Cartoonists' Choice Awards were established to "represent a form of peer recognition, with voting rights granted only to creators working on online webcomics."

=== Awards ===
- Web Cartoonist's Choice Awards, "Outstanding Comic" won by Adam Burke's Boxjam's Doodle.
- Eagle Awards, "Favourite Web-Based Comic" won by Pete Abrams' Sluggy Freelance.

=== Webcomics started ===
- January 1–March 26 — King of Fighters Doujinshi by Vinson Ngo
- January 16 — Okashina Okashi - Strange Candy by Emily Snodgrass and J. Baird
- February 28 — Casey and Andy by Andy Weir
- March 2 — 8-Bit Theater by Brian Clevinger
- March 29 — Nodwick by Aaron Williams
- August 30 — The Morning Improv by Scott McCloud
- September 2 — toothpaste for dinner by Drew
- September 9 — VG Cats by Scott Ramsoomair
- September 10 — Makeshift Miracle by Jim Zubkavich
- October 1 — Achewood by Chris Onstad
- October 9 — Get Your War On by David Rees
- October 16 — Big Fat Whale by Brian McFadden
- October — Nowhere Girl by Justine Shaw
- December 19 — Something*Positive by R. K. Milholland
- The Perry Bible Fellowship by Nicholas Gurewitch
- When I Am King by Demian5
- Zombie and Mummy by Olia Lialina and Dragan Espenschied
