= Web fiction =

Type of literature available primarily or solely on the Internet

Web fiction is written works of literature available primarily or solely on the Internet. A common type of web fiction is the web serial. The term comes from old serial stories that were once published regularly in newspapers and magazines.

Unlike most modern books, a work of web fiction is often not published as a whole. Instead, it is released on the Internet in installments or chapters as they are finished, although published compilations and anthologies are not unknown. The web serial form dominates in the category of fan fiction, as writing a serial takes less specialized software and often less time than an ebook.

Web-based fiction dates to the earliest days of the World Wide Web, including the extremely popular The Spot (1995–1997), a tale told through characters' journal entries and interactivity with its audience. The Spot spawned many similar sites, including Ferndale and East Village, though these were not as successful and did not last long. Most of these early ventures are no longer in existence.

Since 2008, web fiction has proliferated in popularity. Possibly as a result of this, more fans of web serials have decided to create their own, propagating the form further, leading to the number of serious, original works growing quickly. Some serials utilize the formats of the media to include things not possible in ordinary books, such as clickable maps, pop-up character bios, sorting posts by tag, and video. Apps like Webnovel and Inkitt offer writer-platform contracts that offer exposure in exchange for a revenue-based cut.

Web fiction has become hugely popular in China, with revenues topping US$2.5 billion.

== Publication formats ==
There are several popular platforms for publishing web serials and webcomics. With their large user bases, the popularity of these sites may arise from their interactive aspects allowing creators, readers, and other users to communicate with one another and create new communities.

=== Dedicated platforms ===
Web fiction platforms such as Wattpad, Royal Road, ScribbleHub, Fictra, GoodNovel, and Webnovel have emerged as hubs for readers and writers. These platforms provide infrastructure for publishing, discovering, and monetizing web fiction. Different platforms tend to specialize in particular genres, creating distinct communities with specific preferences.

=== Social media ===
Some web serials have been told entirely on Twitter or have used it as a way of adding depth to the universe. Character Twitter accounts are a very popular example of this being a form of transmedia storytelling. Twitter is also a useful tool for author-fan interaction and update announcements. There are a variety of Twitter hashtags now in use for the web serial community. Facebook integration is also popular, with Facebook fan pages for web serials or web serial authors as well as character accounts.

Authors use social media platforms primarily for marketing, publicity, and making contact with readers. They tend to adopt a multi-layered approach to self-presentation, with the lines between their "public" and "private" identities often blurred. Research shows that while there may be a limited author-reader community, there is a much stronger online author-author community, founded upon practical support and encouragement.

=== Blog fiction ===
Blog fiction is a form of fiction writing that uses blogs to reach its readership. It is presented in many forms, from a pretend diary or posted novel to a serialblog. The blog format provides a natural framework for serialized storytelling, with each post representing a new installment and built-in commenting features facilitating reader interaction.

Although it has generated some literary critical interest, it remains an isolated niche.

== Business ==
Web serials are cheaper to run than webcomics for the most part, although it is very rare to make money from such works. Many writers use platforms specifically created for hosting fiction. Free writing platforms such as Wattpad have alleviated most serial writers from financial concerns, as well as any requirement for technical knowledge. However, these free hosts provide less flexibility and also may not be as scalable as a pay host.

Donations are a common way of getting money for web serials, often using services such as PayPal, but one of the main means of monetizing Web serials is advertising on blogs, which can allow writers to both host banners or purchase them on other sites and blogs. This can allow authors to recoup many of the costs associated with online novel creation. These are sometimes sufficient to cover the basic costs for hosting, and some of the more popular web serials can succeed with their entire budget made from donations or revenue of this type.

A few web serial authors have taken to collecting their work and releasing in a book format for easy consumption offline. Self-publishing is key in this field, and services such as CafePress and Lulu.com are often used for distribution and sales of these anthologies. The advent and acceptance of the ebook has allowed writers to become quite prolific with "bound collections" offered as downloads in formats such as PDF, Smashwords, and Mobipocket.

On-demand merchandising sites like CafePress and Zazzle are also sources of income from sales of T-shirts, mugs, calendars, mousepads and other fan items.

Some publishers have started using serials on their sites as "eye bait" and proving grounds for novels, Tor Books. Similarly, writers with established series have been able to continue writing those series after being dropped by conventional publishers, as Lawrence Watt-Evans has done with his Ethshar novels.

== Types ==
=== Web novel ===
A web novel is a literary work that is published mainly or exclusively on the Internet. Web novels offer authors the opportunity to share their stories directly online in a continuous format, reaching a wide audience. This model allows authors to receive valuable feedback from readers and further develop their works before physical publication. The low entry barrier also provides unknown authors with the chance to gain recognition and build a fan base without relying on the support of a traditional publisher.

=== Web serial ===
Most web novels are written as serials. Serialized novels have a long history, predating the internet by centuries.

=== Fan fiction ===
Fan fiction popularized the publishing of writing on the internet and set the standards for much of the community interaction surrounding web serials. Many fanfiction works have been published in multi-part works of epic length which prepared internet-based reading audiences for the easy digestion of serialized original works. Some web serial authors (and many authors in general) made their start in fanfiction before setting out for original work, such as Fifty Shades of Grey, which began as a fanfiction of Twilight. Therefore, the readerships for fanfiction and web serials intersect quite a bit, and some fandom language and memes are shared by the web serial community. Most web serials tend towards regular publication schedules, however, whereas the bulk of fanfiction is published at the author's convenience. In fanfiction there is less obligation to finish or continue stories.

Many fan fiction archives such as the popular website Fanfiction.net and Archive of Our Own are set up to accommodate and encourage the publication of serial works. Fanfiction.net has a sister site, Fiction Press, for original work.

=== Interactive novel ===
Authors of traditional paper-and-ink novels have sometimes tried to give readers an interactive experience, but this approach did not become completely feasible until the development of digital media and hypertext. Traditional novels are linear, that is, read from page to page in a straight line. Interactive novels, however, offer readers a unique way to read fiction by choosing a page, a character, or a direction. By following hyperlinked phrases within the novel, readers can find new ways to understand characters. There is no wrong way to read a hypertext interactive novel. Links embedded within the pages are meant to be taken at a reader's discretion – to allow the reader a choice in the novel's world.

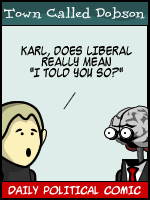
Panel of 2004 webcomic Town Called Dobson

=== Webcomic ===
Webcomics, online comics, or Internet comics are comics published on a website. While most are published exclusively on the web, some are also published in magazines, newspapers, or often self-published books.

Webcomics can be compared to self-published print comics in that almost anyone can create their own webcomic and publish it. As of January 2007, the four largest webcomic hosting services hosted over 18,000 webcomics, ranging from traditional comic strips to graphic novels and covering many genres and subjects.

In the past, few were financially successful. However, as webcomics have risen in popularity in recent years, many artists have garnered the support and trust of loyal audiences who are willing to pay for their work through sites such as Patreon or Podia.

== See also ==
- Interactive fiction
- Online book
- Xianxia, a fantasy genre popular on the Chinese internet
