= Theater Hopper =

Webcomic about films

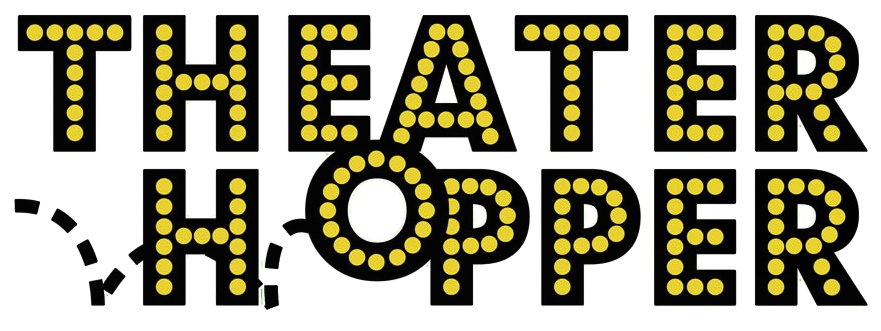
- Theater Hopper logo
- Author: Tom Brazelton
- Website: http://www.theaterhopper.com/
- Current status/schedule: Ended
- Launch date: August 2, 2002
- End date: December 31, 2012
- Genre: Movie comic

Theater Hopper is a semi-autobiographical webcomic based on the escapades of characterized versions of author Tom Brazelton, his wife Cami, and buddy Jared, as they discuss, attend, and purchase films. In 2008, it was self-described as the "longest-running movie-themed webcomic", ultimately being publishing from August 2, 2002 to December 31, 2012.

With a personal and academic history with comics and design, Brazelton combined the two interests to develop Theater Hopper in 2002. The first characters are based on the artist and those close to him, requiring a thin line to be tread between reality and fantasy. The inclusion of original characters in 2004 allowed for more freedom in storytelling, as well as the introduction of story arcs.

Emphasizing the writing over the art, Brazelton performs the latter with a combination of hand-drawn art and digital coloring. Over the years, Theater Hopper's schedule shifted from three times a week to once a week in 2010. The site began with receiving only about 50 unique visitors per day, but over the years, that number has fluctuated between 3,000 and 10,000. Brazelton covers the cost of running the site through advertising and selling physical books of Theater Hopper strips.

== History ==
=== Artist ===
From Des Moines, Iowa, Tom Brazelton /ˈbræzəltʌn/ was born an only child on December 21, 1977, and has been collecting comic books since age eight. Brazelton drew comics in middle school, and spent his high school and college years studying graphic design and print design. While in college at the University of Northern Iowa, Brazelton was a concert and album reviewer for the Northern Iowan, his college newspaper.

When he started Theater Hopper in 2002, Brazelton was working as a freelance music reviewer for The Des Moines Register, in 2004 he worked at a movie theater for "about 8 months", and in 2006, he was a web designer for Allied Insurance. In 2007, Brazelton and his wife added their first child (a son, Henry) to the family. In February 2009, Brazelton was taking night classes in pursuit of his master's degree in communication leadership at Drake University. In December 2009, the Brazeltons added a second child (a daughter, Pearl) to their family.

=== Art ===
Before creating Theater Hopper, Brazelton created the website Des Moines Music Online (DMMO) to discuss the local music scene. Brazelton created DMMO to practice web design and enhance his heavily print media-based skill set; the site lasted about a year and a half, closing when it became too involved and intense for him to continue running solo. Looking for a new web project to further expand his repertoire of skills, Brazelton found Penny Arcade comics being run in The Official Playstation Magazine; Penny Arcade led him to PvP, and it was while reading these that Brazelton realized his interest in doing the same: "Webcomics were the perfect way to blend my interest in storytelling, illustration and web design." Considering himself to be equally interested in music as he is film, Brazelton eschewed a music-interest based comic so as not to re-tread the paths beaten by web cartoonists Mitch Clem and Jeph Jacques.

== Premise ==
Theater Hopper is a combination of character commentary on films (past, present, and future), and irregularly recurring segments focusing more on the characters and only tangentially on films.

=== Characters ===
Brazelton admitted in a 2003 interview that when he started the comic and was unsure as to its potential longevity, he fell back on using himself and those close to him to avoid writing backstories for potentially short-lived characters. This shortcut also hamstrings Brazelton's potential for development; he cannot reveal too much back story of the characters out of concern for their counterparts' privacy, yet he can't make something up because readers will attribute the fiction to the real person. In 2009, Brazelton confessed that if he were to go back with what he knew now, he would begin again with all-original characters, despite the artificial familiarity it breeds in his fans. The main characters which have been based on real people are author Tom, his wife Cami, their beagle Truman, and Tom's friend Jared. Brazelton has gone on record saying his young son, Henry, will not be joining the comic strip because of the limitations it would put on his and his wife's characters to be responsible and parental.

In terms of exactly how autobiographical it's meant to be… well, certainly some of our conversations are exaggerated for comedic effect. But some of the exchanges I've had with my wife, for example, I've posted verbatim. We have a great time talking about movies and celebrity culture.

— Tom Brazelton (July 19, 2008)

Tom
Tom is based on the artist himself. Though his comic alter-ego tends to be "more offensive or ignorant about his surroundings", the artist and his doppelgänger have become more similar over the years than not.
Cami
Also a graduate of the University of Northern Iowa, Cami is Tom's wife in real life and in the strip. When Brazelton first added her to the strip, he explained that she'd requested to be added and so he obliged.

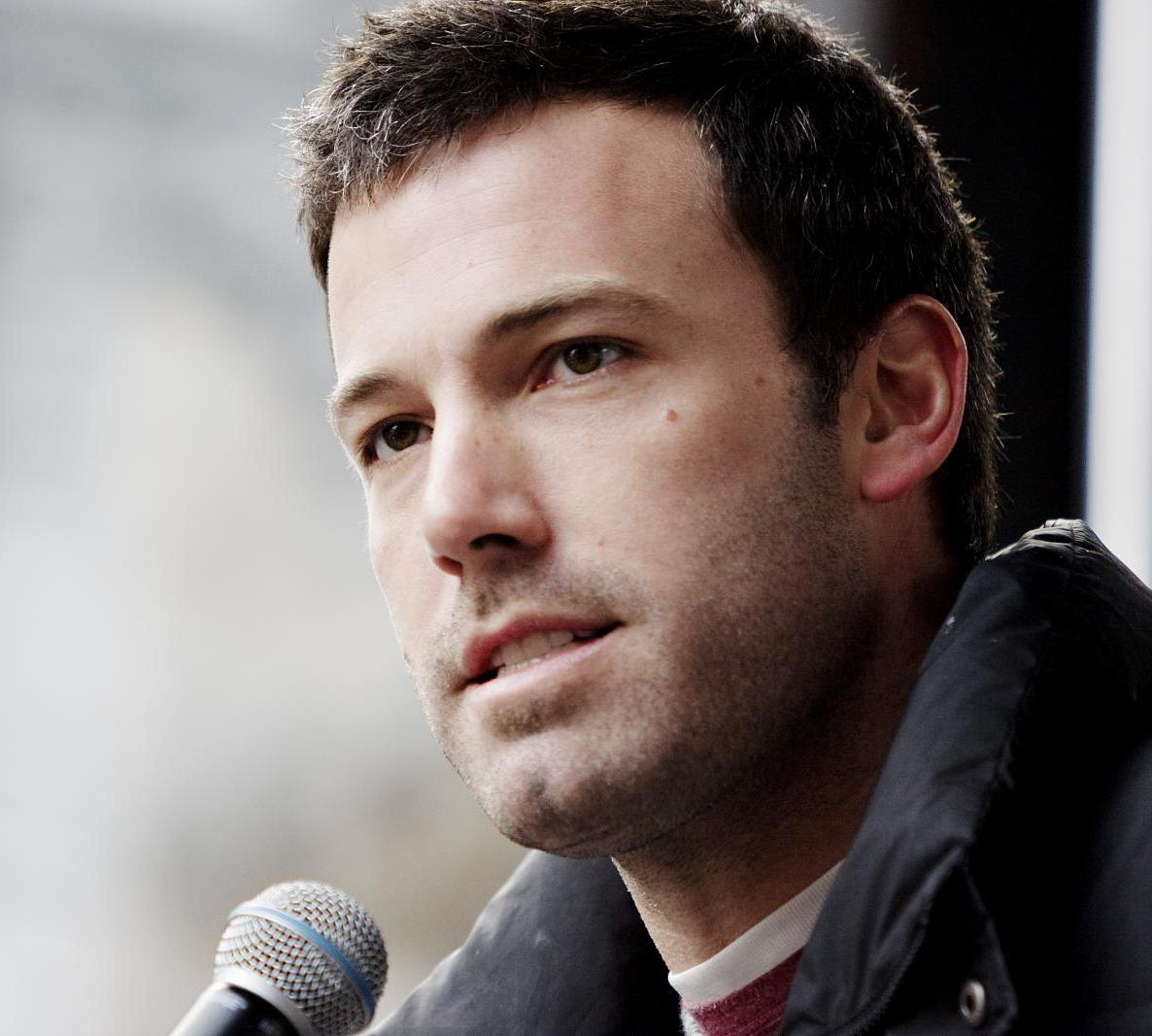
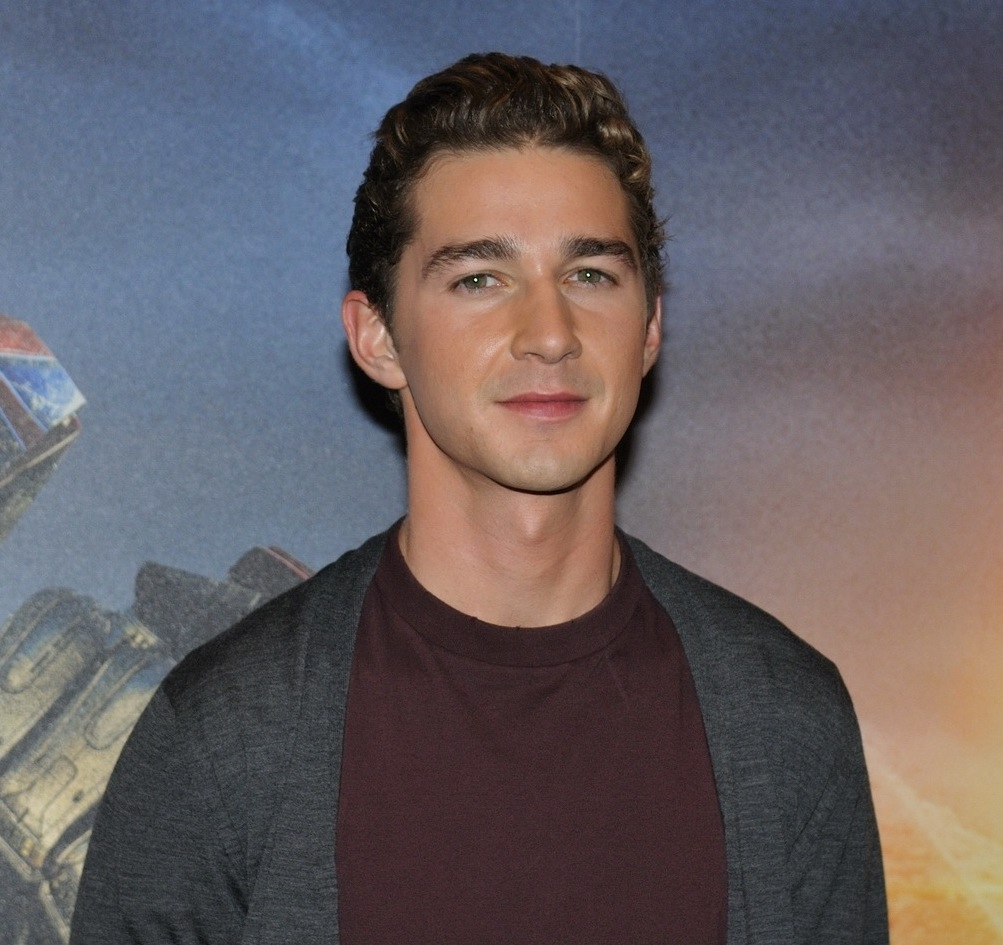
Jared is Brazelton's proxy for the latter's dislike of actors Ben Affleck (left) and Shia LaBeouf (right).

Jared
Jared is based on the real-life best friend of Brazelton's, and his inclusion in the comic was not initially with his counterpart's consent. Both Jareds (real and fictional) are married; his wife Patti makes only rare appearances in the comic because Brazelton is reluctant to sully her good nature with the strip's jokes. The character's signature vitriolic hatred for Ben Affleck and Shia LaBeouf—obviously exaggerated—stems from Brazelton's own dissatisfaction with the actors.
Truman
Barzelton's dog Truman first appears over a month after the strip started ("The Truth") when his real-world counterpart (born February 22, 2002) was seven months old; Brazelton added him at the insistence of Cami.
Jimmy
Jimmy first appeared a month after the strip debuted (in "Tumbleweeds") as "the hapless movie theater employee." Jimmy is an original character, and was written to be an anomalous theater employee who actually enjoys working at the multiplex in contrast to theater workers with whom Brazelton was more accustomed. Brazelton describes Jimmy as "the moral center of the comic".
Charlie
Charlie was introduced in the first strip of 2005 as an estranged friend of Cami's. She was added to the comic to provide more character development opportunities and make Theater Hopper as a whole more serialized and progressive.

=== Storytelling ===
Theater Hopper's first long story arc was in September 2004 when Jimmy was fired from his job at the multiplex for a short time; the 15-strip story lasts 33 days and resets things to the status quo at its end. Another arc followed in January 2005; running about a month-long, it introduced Charlie—an original (i.e. wholly fictional) character—to the strip. January–March 2009, Theater Hopper ran a third arc featuring Brazelton's original characters, Jimmy and Charlie, and explaining their intertwined backstories; Brazelton was inspired to write this storyline when writing Theater Hopper Year Three and re-reading the second arc to add commentary.

Brazelton began introducing more recurring characters in the strip's third year (Jimmy & Charlie) in an effort to emulate Jeph Jacques' success with Questionable Content. The two introductory storylines featuring the new characters were popular with Brazelton's audience "because they showed a dimension to the characters that made the audience invest in them as creations. They weren't simply avatars for my out-there opinions about films and demonstrated I could stretch beyond gag-a-day joke writing." He backed away from converting the theme of the entire strip when some alienated fans complained, and Brazelton felt as though he were abandoning his roots. COMIXtalk's Xaviar Xerexes described Theater Hopper as straddling the fence between two other popular film-based webcomics, Joe Loves Crappy Movies (a movie review in comic form), and Multiplex (a serialized, character-driven story); Xerexes likened Theater Hopper more to Penny Arcade or VG Cats as opposed to PvP or Questionable Content.

The strip endeavors to remain realistic and plausible. Fantastical events and breaking the fourth wall occur infrequently; often—though not always—they're revealed to be characters' dreams or fantasies.

== Production ==
=== Writing ===
Forced to choose between the two in a 2008 interview, Brazelton claimed that the writing in his comics was more important than the art; "You can try to dazzle people [with your art] all you like and some people will fall for it. But most people see right through the deception." Conceding his writing as the weakest point of Theater Hopper in 2006, Brazelton noted his tendency to be overly verbose, and how it was detrimental to his four-panel formatting and a difficult obstacle to overcome.

Enjoying the writing of "Mamet, Sorkin, Whedon [and] Allen", Brazelton also feels the bizarre dry humor of Berkeley Breathed is a good match for his own sentiments. With the comic, Brazelton is careful not to label himself a critic, instead writing as a fan of movies and expressing his opinion through his characters. Though he was originally careful to analyze a topic from all sides before penning a script, he now eschews the pretense in favor of writing his "hard line" opinion and sticking with that.

Brazelton admitted in a February 2009 interview to seeing fewer movies than previously due to professional and personal commitments. Whereas previously he and his wife would go and see upwards of 1–3 films each weekend, now the complications of hiring babysitters and attending class severely curtails their ability to see films together, leaving him to watch the film his wife wouldn't otherwise by himself. They make a concerted effort to watch all Best Picture nominees, and even this has proven difficult with their timetables.

=== Drawing ===
Brazelton cites comic books as the chief influence on his art style. Though an ardent admirer of Bill Watterson, Brazelton claimed he could not cite the artist as an influence, opining the skill of the former far outstripped that of himself; instead, he believes that Bill Amend is the professional comic artist whose style he most emulates.

Despite drawing Theater Hopper in a traditional comic strip format, it was never Beazelton's intent to have it published as such (in a newspaper). Since 2003, Brazelton's comic-creation process involved pencilling and inking the strip (with Micron pens) before scanning them into Paint Shop Pro to color them; by December 2006 he had switched to the Adobe Photoshop program, and was spending less time on the process of creating the comic and instead polishing it with his increasing software skill.

=== Scheduling ===
The comic's schedule has varied over the years. Brazelton originally planned to run the comic on a Monday, Wednesday, Friday schedule, though by mid-2006 he'd moved it to a Sunday, Tuesday, Thursday schedule. In May 2010, citing new full-time employment (coupled with personal obligations), Brazelton slowed down to only one strip a week (Mondays).

In 2007, after the birth of his first child, the site occasionally replaced thrice-weekly comics with movie reviews while the Brazelton family adjusted to change and considered the future of Theater Hopper. After some time, the comics returned to their regular schedule and the reviews were scaled back, but continued.

== Reception ==
In July 2006, Theater Hopper was receiving around 7,000 visitors per strip, a 14,000% increase from the 50 per strip when he began. A year later, Comic Book Resources reported the site received 6–10,000 "unique visitors per day". At Theater Hopper's height, the site was receiving 10,000 unique visitors a day. By November 2009 however, Brazelton admitted his traffic had fallen off somewhat, and was only receiving 3,000–4,000.

== Economics ==
The site was never intended to be a money-maker or a career option for Brazelton, "It's a coincidence that I get money and keep the site self-supporting." To support the comic, Brazelton initially asked visitors for a US$1 (equivalent to $1.79 in 2025) donation, which was very unproductive. He was more successful when he began selling t-shirts and posters featuring his comic, but it was still insufficient to cover Theater Hopper's costs. By 2006, the site was utilizing advertising networks to sell ad space. Though he was dissatisfied with the aesthetic integration of advertising with his site design, the income—initially $500 (equivalent to $798.53 in 2025) a month—did begin to cover all of Brazelton's varied associated costs. Revenue from Theater Hopper was insufficient for Brazelton to not work a full-time job, and he did not foresee that changing. As of August 2007, the ratio of advertising to merchandising income from Theater Hopper was 70 to 30%, respectively.

== Publications ==
In 2006, the first Theater Hopper book (Theater Hopper Year One) was created, financed by 100 pre-orders. Brazelton's impetus for the book was to generate a tangible version of the work that went into Theater Hopper for himself. Described as akin to audio commentary on DVDs, Year One provides background and behind-the-scenes information about the comics within. At least two more books have been published, following the same titling format (Theater Hopper Year X) as the original. Theater Hopper Year Three was pre-financed via a Kickstarter project.

Theater Hopper was published for "about a year" in a Des Moines, Iowa alternative weekly. In 2008, film website FirstShowing.net partnered with Brazelton to republish Theater Hopper strips for 10 months in 2008.

=== The Triple Feature ===
Brazelton joins fellow film-comics Joe Dunn of Joe Loves Crappy Movies and Gordon McAlpin from Multiplex to produce a weekly podcast called The Triple Feature; begun in 2007, the three authors use the TalkShoe service to discuss films for an hour or so. The podcast is a feature for fans of the three webcomics, it also cross-promotes the three comics, and provides sounding boards of equal fanaticism for the three.
