= 9 Chickweed Lane =

American comic strip

- Author: Brooke McEldowney
- Website: www.gocomics.com/9-chickweed-lane
- Current status/schedule: Running
- Launch date: July 12, 1993
- Syndicate(s): United Feature Syndicate

9 Chickweed Lane is an American comic strip written and drawn by Brooke McEldowney for over 30 years, which follows the fortunes of the women of three generations of the Burber family: Edna, Juliette, and Edda. 9 Chickweed Lane is the address of the characters' former family home. There is occasional overlap of characters between 9 Chickweed Lane and another comic by McEldowney, Pibgorn.

The strip is syndicated by United Feature Syndicate (a division of Andrews McMeel Syndication). It debuted on July 12, 1993. It won the National Cartoonists Society Award for Newspaper Strip in 2005, and has been given Genesis Award Commendations for bringing attention to animal rights.

== Publication ==
Syndicated by United Media, 9 Chickweed Lane debuted on Monday, July 12, 1993, though comics historian Don Markstein notes that some sources erroneously give August 2, 1993.

McEldowney's comic strip primarily focuses on the relationships between its multigenerational female characters, beginning with a single mother, Juliette, and her teen-aged daughter, Edda. Although he did not originally intend to have the characters age, they have done so, though not at real-time.

The comic has dealt with a number of difficult issues including pregnancy out of wedlock, a school shooting, and the impact of sexuality on religious vocations. It has been criticized for addressing such topics, to the point of being removed from some newspapers. It has been both acclaimed and criticized for its "libidinous hot-plot lines" and the enthusiastic sexuality of its characters. In a column entitled The Unbearable Horniness of 9 Chickweed Lane, critic Nathan Rabin criticized the strip's recurring sexual themes, writing "It feels like the only 'gag' in 9 Chickweed Lane is how unbelievably horny all the characters are for each other." Rabin is also critical of the strip's "intellectual pretensions" and McEldowney's "unspeakably pretentious, self-satisfied, endlessly masturbatory" content.

== Design ==
9 Chickweed Lane was originally drawn by hand in black and white. Around 1995, McEldowney moved to digitally-based production, using his computer as a drawing tool. The comic eventually introduced color at the publisher's insistence.

McEldowney trained as a musician and incorporates dance and music into his drawings: several of his characters are dancers, singers, or musicians. One reviewer writes "Dance strips or strips involving just hands, hands hold hands, arms moving, legs moving, are gorgeous and dynamic." Another comments on the Zen-like slowness of McEldowney's sequences, describing his work as lingering on the page, as he often draws out the action across multiple days. Even reviewers who dislike the comic for other reasons have applauded its design qualities:

9 Chickweed Lane has more intriguing layouts and paneling decisions than anything else in newspaper comics of the last twenty years. It has that one thing going for it, and it is really going for it. Read it for the layouts. For the pacing decisions. For how he arranges panels and why he puts in them exactly what he puts in them.

== Characters ==
- Edda van Hoesen (née Burber) – Independent and intelligent with a heroic fantasy life as Superlative Girl, she is a talented, attractive ballet dancer and a skilled piano recitalist who has done modeling for the fictional ladies apparel line Nicolette Cignet. She also holds a black belt in an unspecified martial art. Edda graduated early from her Catholic high school and moved to New York City. Although she had frequently displayed sexual attraction to her ballet partner Seth, she married her longtime sweetheart Amos on September 11, 2017. On December 12, 2019, she found out she was pregnant with twin girls, who were born in the first week of March 2020.
- Juliette Martine Kiesl (née O'Malley, formerly Burber) – Divorced (from Jack) and the single mother of Edda, she is the daughter of Edna O'Malley. Juliette has a creative fantasy life (her alter-ego is the leopard skin-clad Panther Woman) but is competent at achieving her goals in reality. A Fulbright scholar, after being a biology professor at a New Hampshire university, she followed her dream of owning and operating a farm. She later married Elliott Greene in a ceremony officiated by Thorax, and eventually returned to the school in a part-time position. She learned she is the product of a brief relationship her mother had with an Austrian opera singer, Peter Kiesl, and later took on his family name. She was named after her stepfather's first wife, Martine Juliette.
- Edna "Edie" Ernst O'Malley/Eva Kiesl – Mother of Juliette and grandmother of Edda. "Gran" is irascible and argumentative, though loving. In her youth she was a beautiful, talented USO singer and spy for Allied Intelligence during World War II. Much of her life is told in an extended year-long flashback sequence, begun in October 2009, that has been described as "ambitious, moving, and still often pungently funny" and "one of the most engrossing and well-told stories from this year". During that time she had a relationship with Lt. Peter Kiesl, an Austrian Wehrmacht POW in England, which they rekindled ten years later in New York City when he was a visiting singer for the Metropolitan Opera; this led to a very brief engagement and the conception of Juliette. Afterward, Edna married Bill O'Malley, with whom she had a second child (Roger), and was later widowed. After Kiesl, who she thought had recently died, visited her in New Hampshire to express his continued love for her, Edna moved to Vienna and married him.
- Amos van Hoesen – A geeky, talented classical cellist and Edda's husband, who occasionally accompanies her in performance. Best friends since childhood that blossomed into love, he graduated from the same school as she and went on to study at Juilliard. They finally consummated their love after Edda performed a dance with Amos providing a piano accompaniment in November 2004, renewed their love at a music competition in Belgium and wedded after a lengthy courtship and engagement. They have since become parents to twin daughters Polly and Lolly.
- Thorax – Formerly Gran's gentleman friend, he is brilliant and odd beyond all description. Apparently a large, amiable elderly farmer, he does not appear to be quite human, and has a quantum anomaly in his tractor shed. Thorax and Edna dated a few years until Edna's reunion with Kiesl. He also appears in McEldowney's online strip Pibgorn. On Oct. 4, 2017 he was revealed to be Sven's father. He claims to be married to Esme Meadow, and have the name William Meadow. In a storyline commencing September 2021 Thorax recalls joining the Canadian RAF during WW2 and becoming romantically involved with Polish double-agent Zofia Przyjukylska.
- Pap – Thorax's father is aged beyond reckoning, with a classic Yankee-farmer acerbic mien.
- Elliott Greene – Juliette's love interest, and her co-worker at the university. In January 2006, Juliette accepted the most recent in his long series of marriage proposals, and they were married by Thorax.
- Seth Appleby – Edda's dancing partner and housemate, a physically imposing, handsome bisexual with a boyfriend and an occasional indulgence with a female partner. In a storyline that began at the start of Pride Month 2021, he began cheating on his boyfriend with Fernanda Jons, eventually culminating in their marriage.
- Mark – Seth's live-in boyfriend until July 2021; an artist and gallery owner.
- Fernanda Jons – Seth's former female friend-with-benefits, a ballerina from Argentina who was temporarily partnered with him in the ballet company. Dream sequences throughout July 2021 have her as a recurring fantasy of Seth's, and he asks her to marry him in the July 17th strip. In the July 28th strip, it is revealed that Fernanda has had knee surgery and can no longer dance. She and Seth married on September 1, 2021.
- Janice – A friend of Edda's from the ballet company. She has a crush on Mark, who remains her friend while gently rebuffing her advances.
- Isabel Florin – A pianist with a narcissistic bent who accompanies Amos' practice on cello, she likes Amos and has been in conflict with Edda over this. She is of Portuguese origin with a slight accent.
- Burkhardt Kriegl – A violist from Vienna. A womanizer regularly rebuffed by Edda, he took up with Isabel.
- Fleurette ("Fleurrie") Spocket – The veterinarian who came to treat Juliette's sick bull and was once a student in her biology class. She married her longtime veterinary technician, Sven.
- Sven Spocket – Fleurrie's tall, sweet and handsomely hulking, if slightly naive, veterinary technician, formerly a gutter cleaner. They eventually married. He is fluent in four languages and has a Ph.D. in art history (French Rococo, specializing in Jean-Honoré Fragonard). On October 4, 2017, he was revealed to be Thorax's son.
- Sister Steven – a Mother Superior who runs the Catholic school Edda and Amos once attended. An archetypically strict nun with no sense of humor and nicknamed as "Sister Caligula" by her students, she does occasionally show a human side to her nature. Her birth name was Florence Anne Feeney, and her brother is Cardinal Feeney.
- Diane Durly – Formerly Sister Aramus, a nun who used to teach English at the Catholic high school that Edda and Amos attended. She left her vocation after falling in love with Francis Durly. They married in the October 30, 2007 strip, after a long courtship and became parents to a daughter, Florence Anne, in the October 6, 2011 strip (after Sister Steven's name before she became a nun) and has since become a mother to five more children, according to the March 10, 2020 strip. Two years later, she had given birth to three more children.
- Francis Durly – A former Catholic priest who left his vocation after falling in love with Diane, whom he married.
- Mary Rosenzweig – Edda and Amos' classmate from their Catholic high school. Amos used to pursue her for affection, but was always rejected. In more recent times, she's been married and divorced twice; the first husband having two affairs on the side and in the second marriage, she had her own infidelity.
- Solange – Edda's Siamese cat, who appears in ongoing thread of strips focused on her, Hallmarks of Felinity. The cat who would become Solange first appeared on March 23, 1999. Originally, the animal characters in the strip consisted of a whippet named Rudyard, succeeding a greyhound named Divot, and a spot-eyed cat, Ambrose. Rudyard and Ambrose often held mental conversations regarding their human owners, when Rudyard wasn't chucking insults at the cat's naïveté. Solange soon replaced Ambrose after her introduction, and the greyhound disappeared from the strip as well.
- Monty – God in the form of a bald man wearing a suit or else a delusional man who has convinced Thorax that he is indeed God; a test of Monty's powers made him appear to be embarrassed at his inability to pull off even a minor task.
- Earl William "Bill" O'Malley – Gran's late husband and Juliette's stepfather. As a young lieutenant during World War II, he saw Edna perform for the Allied troops and helped recruit her for a spying mission at a British POW camp housing German prisoners. Seriously injured on D Day, he suffered severe amnesia, met and fell in love with his French Resistance contact Martine Clocqueur, and was briefly married to her. Years later he married Edna and moved to Omaha, Nebraska, to have a long, unfulfilled marriage. Bill is the father of Edna's second child, Roger, who is rarely mentioned and was not seen in the strip until November 22, 2010.
- Martine Juliette Clocqueur-O’Malley – A beautiful, feisty French Resistance operative who worked as a double agent with the Nazi German forces during the occupation of France during World War II and was Bill's contact during D-Day. She and Bill fell in love and were married within days of the Liberation of Paris. She was mortally wounded very shortly afterward.
- Roger O'Malley – Son of Bill and Edna, Edda's uncle and Juliette's half-brother. He is married and has eleven children (his wife refers to him as "sturdy"). While he has a long-standing heterosexual relationship with his wife, he was accused by Seth of being a closeted homosexual, despite a complete lack of evidence. He has since come out of the closet, placing considerable stress on his marriage.
- Peter Kiesl (full name Lt. Peter Johann Martin Franz Kiesl) – A professional opera singer from Austria and former officer in the German Army in World War II, he had a romantic liaison with Edna while he was a prisoner of war in England and she was a USO singer working undercover for American Intelligence. Years later in New York City they briefly resumed their romance. He is the biological father of Juliette. Decades later, he visited Edna in New Hampshire, expressed his continued love for her, and the two married and went to live in Vienna together.
- Xiulan Ha'penny Yuan - a highly regarded Hong Kong Chinese cellist from a wealthy family who once challenged Amos at the fictional 2008 Forrestier International Music Competition in Brussels as a runner-up due to the online popularity of his and Edda's makeout session and graciously lost to him, but not before being very touched when he gentlemanly presented her with a rose for being a good sport. She was reintroduced into the series on September 14, 2015, this time as a Juilliard student who understands English and is fond of cheeseburgers (and given the nickname "Wimpy" for it, after the Popeye character) with a brief crush on Amos. Quickly making friends with Edda, she also became engaged after a whirlwind romance with Hugh Godalming within three days after meeting him and later married him. She is also an accomplished pilot and a major stockholder of the fictional airline Canton Airways. She announced her pregnancy to Hugh during a concert duet performance in a May 4, 2022 strip and gave birth to their son Alistair in a May 6, 2023 strip.
- Hugh Portwhistle Godalming - a British pianist at Juilliard and Xiulan's husband. Accomplished as a child prodigy at the piano with a large ego (he once irritated the Pope after a performance for him when he mistook him for a school janitor), his first encounter with Xiulan was mostly confrontational when accidentally kicked her cello case without apology until he was forced to become her accompanist for her student audition when Edda was a no-show. At first very antagonistic with a lot of sexual tension between them, their relationship blossomed into love after a very passionate Brahms duet and were engaged after only three days of meeting each other. Usually wears a heavy overcoat as an alter-ego persona as Sherlock Beethoven (a portmanteau of Sherlock Holmes and Ludwig van Beethoven). He became a father to son Alistair on May 6, 2023.
- Ginger Ouyang - a Canton Airways airline steward and Xiulan's friend, who also is the de facto CEO fronting for Xiulan as a figurehead of the airline.
- Arthur Peel - An English composer in his mid-60s hired by Xiulan and Hugh to score her project for Korean television. A celibate and emotionally somewhat distant man all his life, he wrote a piano piece for the production entitled “Reverie” that sends people into a fiery romantic flurry upon hearing it. After meeting his assigned assistant Nan-Lin Peel began an awkward courtship (which included auditioning and performing together for a stage production of Gilbert and Sullivan’s The Yeomen of The Guard), he finally professed his love for her despite his self-deprecating insecurities and age and later married her.
- Nan-Lin Peel - a Korean-American woman in her 30s and Arthur's wife. Originally was hired by Xiulan to be an assistant to manage Arthur Peel (and partly as a joke since they both share the same surname), she became the inspiration behind his erotically-charged “Reverie” and, after a quick if complicatedly frustrating courtship, became his wife despite their age differences.
- Esme Meadow - A policewoman who is romantically interested in Thorax. He claims to be married to her.
- Zofia Przyjukylska- A Polish double-agent during WW2 who becomes romantically involved with Thorax and to whom she becomes engaged. She is killed during the war by a Luftwaffe strafing attack.
- Polly and Lolly van Hoesen - Identical twin daughters of Edda and Amos. Even at a young age they show themselves to be intelligent, literate, and dry-witted. In storylines set in the future, they are skilled musicians like their parents; both can play piano like their mother, while Polly also plays the violin and Lolly is a cellist. The twins grow up with Alistair Godalming, and when they grow up they share a mutual attraction. He attempts to date both of them at the same time, proposing before their first date, but eventually commits to Lolly.
- Alistair Godalming - The son of Xiulan Yuan and Hugh Godalming, featured mostly in storylines set in the future. A shy and awkward young man raised by musicians to be a concert pianist. While early strips claim he is 16, it is later clarified that he is actually 19, his mother "adding a couple extra fifth birthdays to his age." He is engaged to Lolly van Hoesen, having asked her to marry him when he turns 20.

== Awards ==
9 Chickweed Lane won the National Cartoonists Society Award for Newspaper Strips in 2005. It has also received 2 Genesis Award Commendations, for bringing attention to animal rights in a sequence involving the adoption of a greyhound.

== Spin-off ==
Brooke McEldowney is also the creator of the webcomic Pibgorn, a spin-off. The strips appear to share the same universe, with the character Thorax appearing in both series regularly, and almost the entire cast of Pibgorn showing up as guests at two Chickweed weddings in the strips of October 29, 2007, and August 28, 2017.

== Collections ==
9 Chickweed Lane has been published in several hardcopy collections, most available from Pib Press. These include:

- Hallmarks of Felinity (Out of print)
- Out Whom Shall We Gross? (Year One, 1993–1994)
- Sonata for Piano and Armpit (Year Two, 1994–1995)
- The Day my Puberty Detonated (Year Three, 1995–1996)
- Rita Hayworth, the Father of Relativity (Year Four, 1996–1997)
- CRUD From Outer Space, and Other Causes of Postnasal Drip (Year Five, 1997–1998)
- Cat Breath Takes No Prisoners (Year Six, 1998–1999)
- On Alternate Thursdays, I Surrender My Body to SATAN (Year Seven, 1999–2000)
- Dumpster God (Year Eight, 2000–2001)
- We'll Always Have Brussels, or The Bösendorfer Heard Round the World
- Edie Ernst, USO Singer – Allied Spy

== Controversy over anti-Asian language ==
On December 1, 2021, a strip including an anti-Asian slur resulted in GoComics pulling that day's strip. It was part of a series set during World War II, when the Japanese fighter plane Mitsubishi A6M Zero was often called a "Jap Zero" in contemporary usage. In more modern times, the term "Jap" has become considered a racial slur. On December 9, The Los Angeles Times announced that they were removing the strip after receiving "hundreds of letters" from readers. In their statement, they stated "Our decision was based not on one offensive comic but on an evaluation of the strip overall, and more broadly an evaluation of our entire comic catalog." GoComics did not publish the strip for December 1, nor for December 3 in which the term "queer" was used as a verb, meaning to spoil.

== See also ==
- Portrayal of women in comics
