= Clickies =

Dutch webcomics award

Clickburg Webcomic Awards
- The Clickies mascot by Rutger Ockhorst
- Country: Netherlands
- First award: 2005
- Final award: 2010
- Website: clickburg.nl

The Clickburg Webcomic Awards, generally referred to as the Clickies, were a Dutch webcomics awards ceremony held four times between 2005 and 2010. Created to promote webcomics in the Netherlands and Belgium, the Clickies were first awarded in 2005 at the world's first webcomic convention, Clickburg. The awards were again bestowed in 2006, 2007, and 2010, each time in a slightly different format.

== History ==
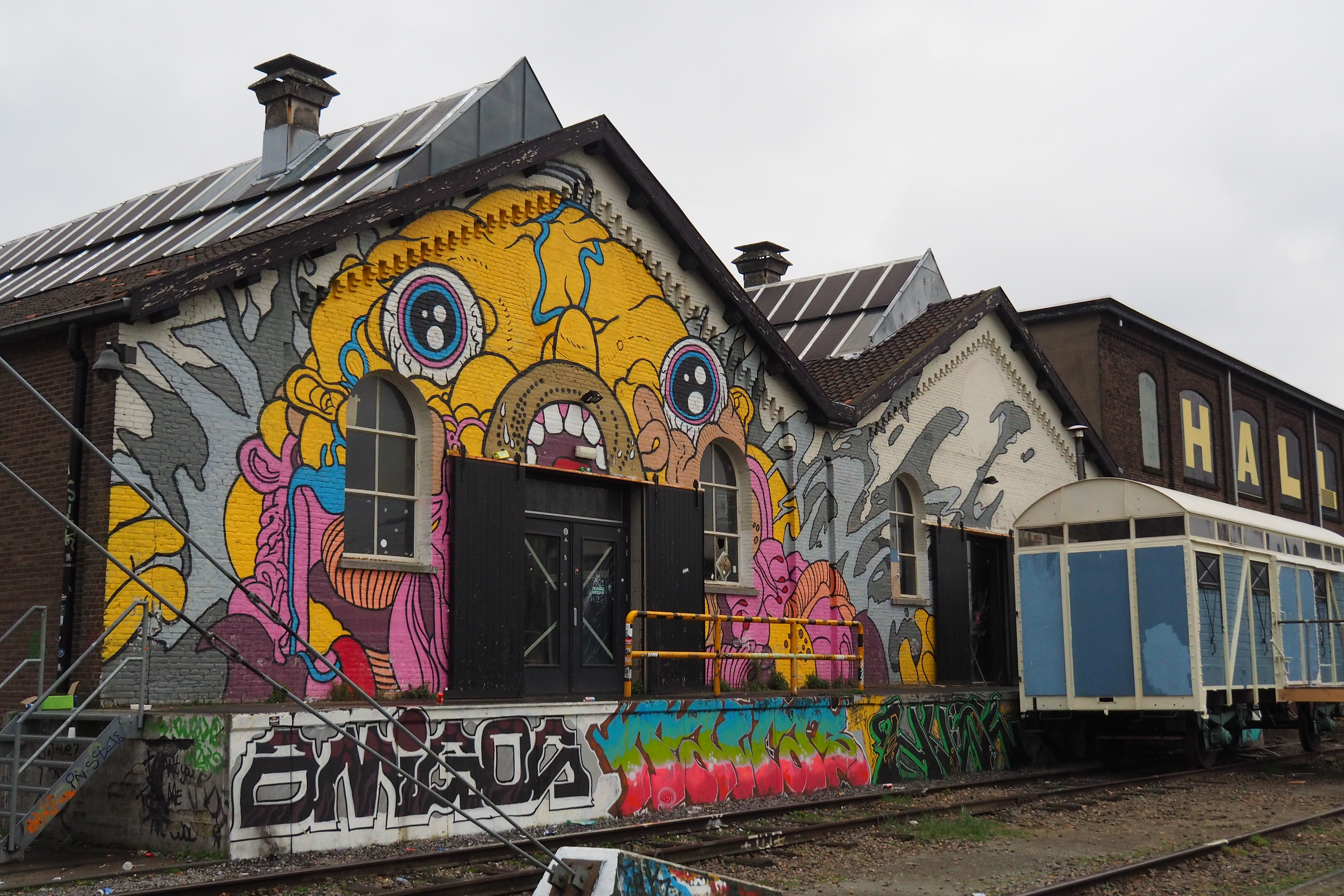
Clickburg was held in the Tilburg Hall of Fame

The Clickburg Webcomic Awards were first awarded on May 1, 2005, at Clickburg, the world's first webcomic exhibition. The Clickburg foundation was set up by René van Densen, in collaboration with Jeroen Mirck, and Stephan Fellinger. The event was held at the Tilburg Hall of Fame and featured musical performances, workshops, and lectures. Around 43 webcartoonists were able to present their webcomics on large screens and through video projectors, and Clickburg featured a lecture by Evert Geradts. None of the three Clickies winners were present in Tilburg during Clickburg, so the organization delivered the trophies by car.

The second edition of the Clickies was awarded at the Stripdagen Haarlem in June 2006. Jury chairman Jeroen Mirck noted during the event that webcartoonists were not utilizing the specific opportunities of the medium enough, saying "too many online strips are no more than strips lost on a screen."

The Clickburg Webcomic Awards were bestowed at Stripdagen Houten in 2007. The Clickburg foundation and its Web forum went quiet after this event. The Clickies returned for the fourth and final time in 2010, when they were again awarded as part of the Stripdagen Haarlem. This year, the jury consisted of comic shop owner Klaas Knol, journalist Natasja van Loon, cartoonist Jeroen Jager, writer Johan de Rooij, and new chairman Tom Hamoen. The 2010 Clickies were awarded in the Haarlem Vishal on June 5.

== Winners ==
As Clickburg's objective is to promote webcomics in the Netherlands, the Clickies were exclusively awarded to Dutch and Belgian cartoonists, with the exception of the 2006 international category. The Clickies featured several equal categories, such as the Epic Clickie for narrative-focused webcomics and the Humor Clickie for comedic webcomics.

Category	Title	Creator(s)	Website
2005 Clickburg Webcomic Awards
Epic Clickie	Hotel	Han Hoogerbrugge	hotel.submarinechannel.com
Gag Clickie	Poepoe	Jean-Marc van Tol	poepoe.nl (archived)
Cartoon Clickie	Geza	Geza Dirks	Geza.nu
2006 Clickburg Webcomic Awards
Epic Clickie	Stuff Sucks	Liz Greenfield	stuffsucks.com (archived)
Humor Clickie	Mijn wekelijkse stripje	Stephan Brusche	mws.sb77.nl (archived)
International Clickie	E-Merl	Daniel Merlin Goodbrey	e-merl.com
2007 Clickburg Webcomic Awards
Gag Clickie	Rood Gras	Rob van Barneveld	Roodgras.nl
Epic Clickie	Werk in Uitvoering	Martijn van Santen	Stortbak.net
Medium Clickie	Little Starman	Sandra Kleine Staarman	Littlestarman.nl (archived)
Group Clickie	Pulp deLuxe	Kristof Speay, Mario Boon, and others	PulpDeLuxe.be
Cartoonist Choice	DoyouknowFlo	Floor de Goede	DoyouknowFlo.nl
Ere-Clickie (Note: Honorable mention (Clicke-of-honor))		René van Densen	
2010 Clickburg Webcomic Awards
Cartoon Clickie	Hallie Lama	Hallie Lama	Hallielama.blogspot.com
Epic Clickie	Curtain Call	Setsuna	Curtaincall.smackjeeves.com (archived)
Gag Clickie	Cartoondiarree	Michiel van de Pol	MichielvandePol.nl

== See also ==
- List of European art awards
