= Boots and Pup =

2005 science-fiction webcomic

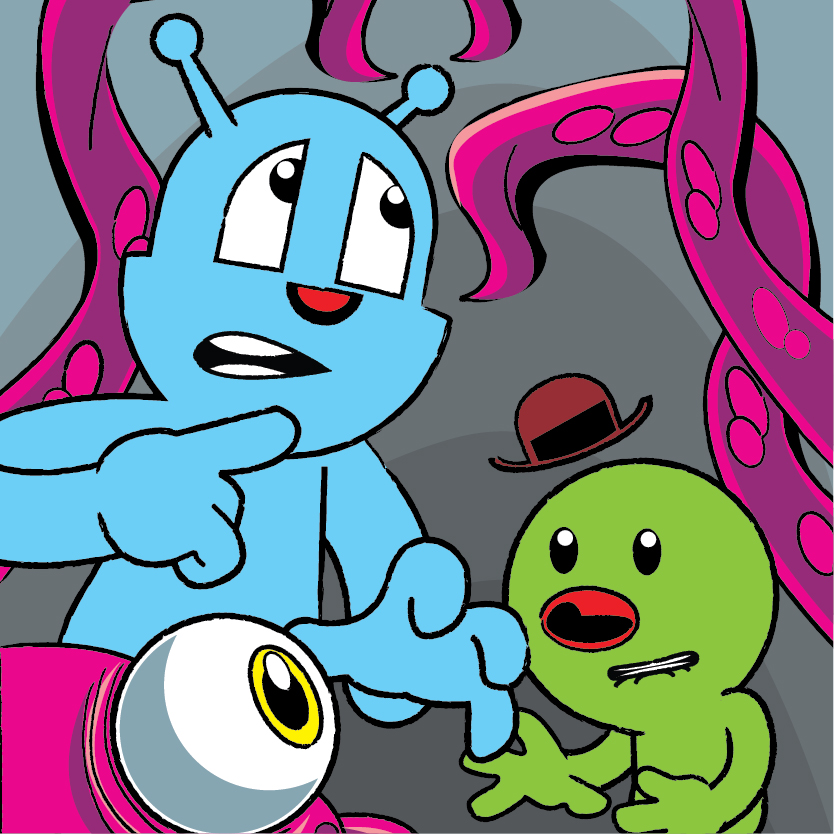
- Boots (left) and Pup
- Author(s): John Yuskaitis Jr.
- Website: bootsandpup.com
- Current status/schedule: Ongoing
- Launch date: 21 February 2005
- Genre(s): Science-fiction

Boots and Pup is a science-fiction webcomic by John Yuskaitis Jr.. Launched in February 2005, Boots and Pup is about an alien duo traveling through space.

== Synopsis ==
Boots and Pup centers on the titular characters Boots and Pup as they travel through space. Boots is the son of an accountant and his dream in life was to be as uninteresting and stable as his parents were, while Pup is an impulsive orphan raised by circus clowns. Despite their differences, the two characters become lifelong friends and traverse the universe together.

== Development ==
Yuskaitis grew up on his father's Donald Duck comic books. He originally conceived of the idea of Boots and Pup in high school, inspired by the back-and-forth interactions of comedy duos such as Abbott and Costello. Yuskaitis had not heard of webcomics before, but when a friend suggested publishing Boots and Pup online in 2005, Yuskaitis began posting it as such. As he was writing the webcomic, Yuskaitis took more inspiration from series such as Star Wars and Star Trek to make Boots and Pup more narratively driven.

Boots and Pup went on hiatus in 2007, but returned to a six-day-a-week schedule in 2011. Yuskaitis also created an animated short based on his webcomic, and a free iOS game featuring series' side character Sniffles the Fish.

In an interview in 2018, Yuskaitis said that "the characters write themselves. I am continually surprised by the outcome of these stories. I think that's because on a subconscious level, these characters are me." He noted here that he was "firmly raised on the Carl Barks school of storytelling," and that he was inspired by TV series such as Futurama and Aqua Teen Hunger Force.

=== Publications ===
Collected volumes of Boots and Pup have been released through the CreateSpace Independent Publishing platform since 2014.

- Yuskaitis Jr., John (2014-05-22). Boots & Pup Book 1: Inspired Laziness. CreateSpace. ISBN 978-1512141115.
- Yuskaitis Jr., John (2014-07-21). Boots & Pup: Collected Craziness. CreateSpace. ISBN 978-1500606640.
- Yuskaitis Jr., John (2015-05-16). Boots & Pup Book 2: The Amulet of Sum-Tin. CreateSpace. ISBN 978-1512141115.
- Yuskaitis Jr., John (2017-07-17). Good Ol' Boots and Pup. CreateSpace. ISBN 978-1548988159.
- Yuskaitis Jr., John (2018-06-03). Boots and Pup: Webcomics. CreateSpace. ISBN 978-1720741909.
- Yuskaitis Jr., John (2014-06-24). Boots and Pup: Toastbusters. CreateSpace. ISBN 978-1722014308.

== Reception ==
Barbra Dillon of The Fanbase Press praised Boots and Pup strongly, calling it "easy to engage for younger readers while also captivating and entertaining for adults." Reviewing Book 2: The Amulet of Sum-Tin, Dillon praised Yuskaitis' "incredible talent and energy", said that he had "brought a lively world (and cast of characters) to life," and said that she hoped to see the "lovable" characters transition to animation and video games."

Shawn Perry of Bleeding Cool listed Boots and Pup: Collected Craziness as one of the best indie comic releases of 2014, describing it as a "great gateway series for families." Comic Book Resources called the webcomic "colorful, simply drawn, and kid-friendly yet witty enough for older readers to appreciate."
