= Brooke McEldowney =

American writer and musician

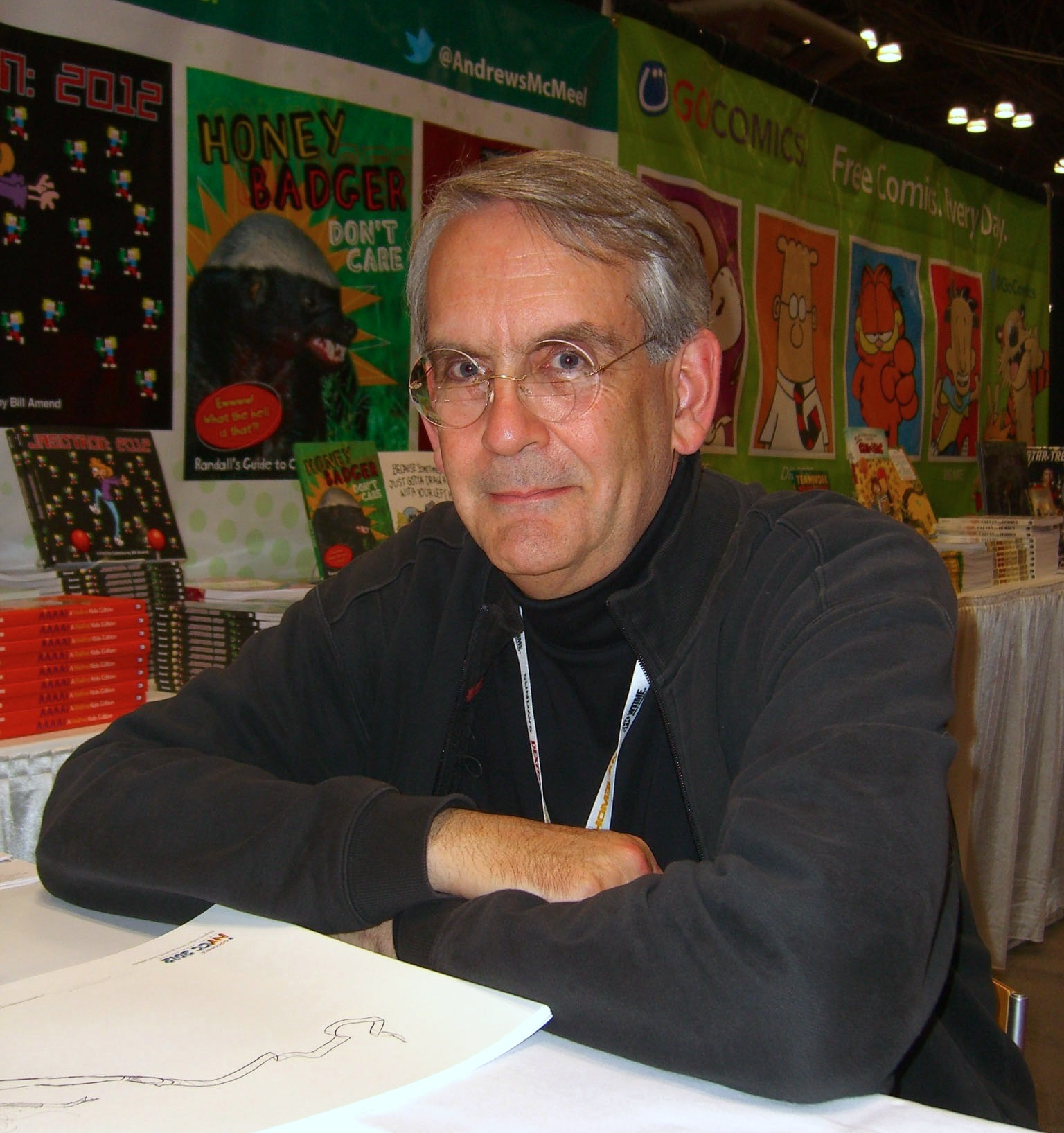
- McEldowney in 2012
- Born: Brooke Jennings McEldowney; August 3, 1952 (age 74) Charleston, West Virginia, U.S.
- Area: Cartoonist
- Notable works: 9 Chickweed Lane, Pibgorn

Brooke McEldowney is an American writer and musician who is best known as the creator of the comics 9 Chickweed Lane and Pibgorn.

== Life ==
McEldowney was born in Charleston, West Virginia, and grew up in Florida. As a child he regularly drew and made music. He studied music at the Juilliard School of Music, obtaining a Bachelor of Arts degree and a Master of Arts degree in the viola, and also practiced drawing by drawing dancers at the School of American Ballet. After graduating, McEldowney lived in Central Europe for some time.

In 2017, McEldowney posted that he had been hospitalized with a stroke, which had left him unable to function as a cartoonist for a while.

Washington Post writer Gene Weingarten described McEldowney in 2019 as "a charming man and something of a polymath [who is] one of the best artists drawing cartoons today".

== Career ==
=== Music and music writing ===
McEldowney has worked as a chamber musician and a freelance journalist, writing about classical music for Opus and Keynote. According to McEldowney, he taught music for a time when he lived in Greenwich, Connecticut. He was assistant editor and contributing cartoonist for Opus, a classical music magazine, and has had cartoons published in Yankee and Pulse. His first cartoon sale was to Punch.

=== Comics ===
McEldowney's first comic, 9 Chickweed Lane, was syndicated and appeared in newspapers in 1993. It won the National Cartoonists Society Award for in the Newspaper Strips division in 2005. It has been published in several collections.

His second comic, Pibgorn, began in 2002 and is only published online. The webcomic follows the title character, a fairy whose adventures span the fantasy and real worlds. Pibgorn and 9 Chickweed Lane occasionally cross over. McEldowney described Pibgorn as "very much an outgrowth of A Midsummer Night's Dream."

McEldowney's comics have often been described as sex-focused or as having more depiction of physical intimacy than typical newspaper comics. Washington Post writer Michael Cavna said that "we usually can rely on our cartoon coitus to be only implied... But cast our innocent eyes toward "9 Chickweed Lane"... and it's starting to get hot'n here." In other posts he said that McEldowney, "flat-out rejoices in drawing women's bodies" and that both of his comics were "putting the 'strip' in comic strip". Another Washington Post writer, Gene Wingarten, said about 9 Chickweed Lane, "I believe his audience gets him and what drives him: He is fascinated by sex, is mystified by, and in love with women, and finds the mating dance hilarious." On the sexual nature of the comic, Weingarten said, "As a cartoonist McEldowney learned long ago that he can get away with what others might not be able to because he is an elegant illustrator, because his female characters are strong and smart, and because most of them are not drawn to be ridiculous, cliched, cartoony unattainable physical types." The comic's "curious, sexually charged atmosphere" has sometimes led to complaints from readers. Critic Nathan Rabin said of 9 Chickweed Lane, "every comic strip seems to be exclusively about how unbelievably horny the men in the strip are for their impossibly willowy, leggy, ethereal partners and how equally horny the women are for their dorky yet erudite and urbane husbands... It feels like the only “gag” in 9 Chickweed Place is how unbelievably horny all the characters are for each other."

A writer for the Lincoln Heights Literary Society said that "Pibgorn... is probably the best illustration of the power and freedom a webcomic offers a good artist. It's got sex, violence, religion, the supernatural, pin-ups, naked flying babes, sci-fi, long and complex story arcs, and, lately, a Noir voice in the narration... This is hardly an X-rated strip, but there are plenty of things in it I wouldn't want to try to explain to anyone under, oh, thirty." A review by the Mythopoeic Society called one story arc "the sexiest interpretation of Shakespeare I've ever seen."

In an interview, McEldowney said of Pibgorn, "I get all sorts of reactions. People love it intensely, people consider it violent and evil, people don't get it at all. However, I draw it for myself only. I don't care what anybody thinks of it, and it is a joy to immerse myself in it without having to look over my shoulder for audience approval."

In 2010, McEldowney asked for the GoComics comment sections for 9 Chickweed Lane and Pibgorn to be removed, saying that the "tenor of posts became subject more and more to abuse." The website stated that "Without a doubt, Pibgorn is a comic strip that generates a lot of conversation. But given Pibgorn’s particular subject matter, and the themes depicted in many of Brooke’s breathtaking sketches and finished pieces, the nature of the conversation and atmosphere on the Pibgorn pages has often taken a turn for the…well, let’s lightly refer to it as ‘unrestrained.’"

=== Other works ===
McEldowney wrote the play Many Mansions, which premiered in 2005. The play, a satire of religious hypocrisy, features a violinist, Cecily Gosling, who has dreamt of a place called Many Mansions, a fantasy world with fairies, nymphs, naiads and a God-like figure named Max Odd. Meanwhile, a young man named James Unser cannot embrace priesthood due to the church's sanctions against romantic love. Another character, J.J. Aubrey, concludes that his and others' existence depends on one true believer, Cecily. McEldowney started working on the play in the 1980s, but set it aside multiple times.
