= Wally and Osborne =

Web comic

Wally and Osborne (formerly On the Rocks)
- Author(s): Tyler Martin
- Website: http://wallyandosborne.com/
- Current status/schedule: Ongoing
- Launch date: July 4, 2005

Wally and Osborne, formerly titled On the Rocks, is a humor webcomic by Tyler Martin. It was launched on July 4, 2005. The first strip is dated June 27 because Martin launched the site with a week's backlog of strips.

The setting is Antarctica, where Wallace "Wally" Fitzgerald McGillicutty, the displaced polar bear, and his long-suffering friend Osborne, an adelie penguin (the spelling was later changed to Osborne from Osbourne, as reflected in the new title), have many comic misadventures.

It is not clear how or why Wally, an Arctic polar bear, ended up in Antarctica, although Osborne suggested it might be due to bipolar disorder.

The comic uses a newspaper-style format with occasional bigger "Sunday strips". It is in color with a limited palette consisting of flat areas of black, white, blue and orange. This color scheme was followed through in the original website design.

Martin accompanies the strip with short text pieces and photos explaining the real-life aspects of Antarctic life that inspire the strip. The box gives real-life weather updates for the Antarctic Peninsula.

On July 3, 2006, to mark the strip's first anniversary, Martin relaunched the site with a new URL, design and title, Wally and Osborne, on the grounds that On the Rocks was too generic a phrase. The site's original design, including the original title logo, is still available on the site as an alternative theme.

The original title temporarily continued to appear on the comic's syndicated appearances (see below) until 2008, when the comic on the website came to an end. Martin has released few details as of to why.

On September 3, 2015, seven years after the last update, Martin announced via a new patreon page that he was returning to continue the series, with new installments every Monday.

== Characters ==
- Wallace "Wally" Fitzgerald McGillicutty is a polar bear who always wears an orange scarf. Wally is upbeat, easygoing, and unintelligent. Wally wears a pair of gray briefs that can only be seen when he removes his scarf. Wally has a "superhero" costume called "Super Wally," consisting of his underwear and a potato sack used as a cape. Martin revealed Wally's full name, including his full given name and family name on February 14, 2007, after posting the "These Boots Are Made For Climbing" chapter.
- Osborne (formerly Osbourne) is an adelie penguin who is more intelligent and less optimistic than Wally. Osborne is seen to love orange juice as seen in a story line where Wally finds a washed up crate of orange juice. Osborne usually ruins other character's enjoyable moments; when Osborne himself encounters an enjoyable moment, Wally ruins the entire experience.

== Minor characters ==
- Penguinus Maximus, nicknamed "Max" by Wally, is a large, prehistoric penguin Wally and Osborne found frozen in the caves. Once unfrozen Max takes a liking to Wally, Wally adopts him. Max runs away and becomes the star of an Argentine television show named "Pinguino y los Niños de Nieve," known in English as "Pinguino & the Snow Kids." The show becomes a success and is dubbed into 27 languages from its original Spanish.
- Unnamed poor penguin is seen in several strips and is probably the most popular minor character.
- "Penguin Juvies" are small penguins (juveniles) who sell worthless items trying to scam Osborne. Osborne always seems to fall for the tricks used by the "Penguin Juvies".
- "Thomas" is another young penguin, involved with the Penguin Juvies mentioned above. He is their hired muscle, and features in a strip where the Penguin Juvies are selling air with their sales pitch being "If you don't buy it, then Thomas here will squeeze it out of you." He is also featured in the "Jury Duty" storyline, where he is charged with theft of a candy bar.

=== Quest for the Beak arc ===
- The Petrel King – The giant petrel and main antagonist of the "Quest for the Beak" arc holds Osborne's beak captive.
- Ralph – Ralph, one of The Petrel King's accomplices, steals Osborne's beak and brags about his act to his peers. Ralph is a skua. Also, two skuas, one named Glen, try to impede Wally's quest to return Osborne's beak to its rightful owner. The skuas attack Wally as the protagonist is scaling a wall of ice. The two force Wally to drop his ice picks. Wally uses the skuas as replacement picks to scale the mountain and lets the skuas go once he reaches the top.
- Howie – Howie is a smaller snow petrel that inspires Wally to continue on his quest to rescue Osborne's beak.

== Syndication ==
On November 23, 2005, the strip began running on Funbrain, a children's edutainment site, along with new notes by Martin on each strip. Then starting April 7, 2006, On the Rocks began to appear along with For Better or For Worse and Cathy at FamilyEducation's new "Mom's Coffee Break" feature. In addition to syndication at these sites, TeacherVision, an online resource for teachers, also features some On the Rocks strips as lesson plans for students to explore comic strips and further creativity.

Funbrain, FamilyEducation and TeacherVision are properties of Pearson Education (part of Pearson PLC).

== Lunchbox Funnies ==
On January 15, 2007, Martin launched Lunchbox Funnies, a portal site linking together several "all-ages" webcomics including Wally and Osborne. According to the site's introductory message:

The term "all-ages" has become something of a mantra for our creators. We've each been working towards creating highly entertaining comics that can be enjoyed by beginning readers, teenagers, and adults alike. We're convinced that "all-ages" doesn't mean "just for kids," but rather it's a label that should apply to entertainment that allows for shared experiences across generational lines. Our creators benefited greatly from quality all-ages entertainment growing up, but these days stories that can be enjoyed by children and adults seem incredibly rare. Lunchbox Funnies wants to change that.

The complete launch line-up comprises:

- Aki Alliance by Ryan Estrada
- Astronaut Elementary by Dave Roman
- Butterfly by Dean Trippe
- Cow & Buffalo by Mike Maihack
- Lunchbox by Ovi Nedelcu
- Silent Kimbly by Ryan Sias
- Wally & Osborne by Tyler Martin
- Zip and Li'l Bit by Trade Loeffler
