= Spamusement! =

Webcomic

- A Spamusement! cartoon based on the email spam title, "you were wrong cabinet sanchez"
- Author: Steven Frank
- Website: http://spamusement.com
- Launch date: July 15, 2004
- Genre: Humor

Spamusement! was a webcomic originally created by software developer Steven Frank, in which Frank took subject lines from real spam emails and turned them into single-panel comics. Some of these were literal interpretations of subject lines, while others put a twist on what illustration the reader may have expected.

Frank described his work as "poorly drawn cartoons inspired by actual spam subject lines." To draw the comics, Frank used a Wacom graphics tablet to sketch his ideas freehand into his computer, using the application Adobe Photoshop Elements.

Frank's cartoons have occasionally featured repeating characters such Cabinet Sanchez, Eggplant Mike and Troy Powell. From the email spam line, "you were wrong cabinet sanchez", Frank drew a file cabinet wearing a bandolier, a Mexican sombrero, and sporting a large black mustache. He published it on July 23, 2004. The cartoon proved popular and was made into merchandise such as T-shirts. Later in 2004, Worm Quartet began performing an original song called "You Were Wrong Cabinet Sanchez" and in 2008 the artist released it as part of the album Mental Notes. The song has been featured on the Dr. Demento radio show during the final "Funny Five" countdown, and was released on Laughter is a Powerful Weapon Volume 2, a compilation of songs from the radio show.

The Spamusement! site also featured forums, one section of which allows readers to create their own spam-inspired comics. Frank did not contribute for three months in early 2006, then posted irregularly from June 2006. Since October 2006, Frank completely turned over the responsibility of comic-making to the forums, although another original comic by Frank appeared on the site in late June 2007.

The website has been offline since 2020.

== See also ==
- Explodingdog
