= The Joy of Tech =

Webcomic

Joy of Tech
- Author(s): Nitrozac and Snaggy
- Website: http://www.joyoftech.com/joyoftech/
- Current status/schedule: Updates Monday, Wednesday, Friday
- Launch date: 2000-08-14
- Genre(s): technology and geek humor

Joy of Tech is a webcomic created by Nitrozac and Snaggy, whose real names are Liza Schmalcel and Bruce Evans. Both are Canadians. The comic, which is produced three times a week, concentrates on technology-oriented themes, with an emphasis on the "cult" of Apple Computer products.

In 2003, O'Reilly Media published a printed compilation, titled The Best of the Joy of Tech, which includes an introduction by David Pogue and a foreword by Steve Wozniak.

Nitrozac and Snaggy also created the webcomic After Y2k, which is not currently updated, and have had other work published in many newspapers, magazines, and online sites.

The strip has been noted by Mashable, MakeUseOf, workawesome, Nocturnal Cloud, CNET, and oneextrapixel, with a selection of strips highlighted by Bored Comics.
