= Instruction and Advice for the Young Bride =

Hoax booklet purporting to date from 1894

Instruction and Advice for the Young Bride on the Conduct and Procedure of the Intimate and Personal Relationships of the Marriage State for the Greater Spiritual Sanctity of this Blessed Sacrament and the Glory of God is a text that purports to be a booklet written by Ruth Smythers in 1894 that states that women find sex displeasurable and discusses methods which a newly married woman may use to discourage her husband from sex. Although there is ample evidence that the text is a joke or hoax - Ruth Smythers, her husband and the institutions mentioned in the pamphlet did not exist, and some of the language and reference points were not used until the 20th century.

The text, purportedly published by Spiritual Guidance Press, New York City and reprinted by The Madison Institute Newsletter, has become a well-known humorous pamphlet. It has been published in book form, appearing as Sex Tips for Husbands and Wives from 1894.

== Internet origins ==
The text, which has circulated and spread over websites and blogs is sometimes sourced to a 1998 course on human sexuality in the University of Washington. However, as this was two years after a passage of the book was read out in a legal hearing during the Krull case, this is unlikely.

== Krull case ==
In 1996, the Ombudsman of King County in Seattle, David Krull, was fired for misconduct after he emailed the text of the booklet to his assistant, Amy Calderwood, who was about to get married. Krull had stated that the email was a light hearted joke, but Calderwood claimed it was "inappropriate", her fiancé said it was "vile" and council member Maggi Fimia, who voted for Krull to be fired, called the text "incredibly offensive". Fimia picked out the following passage and said it was suitable only for discussion in a women's studies class:

Most men are by nature rather perverted, and if given half a chance, would engage in quite a variety of the most revolting practices. These practices include, among others, performing the normal act in abnormal positions; mouthing the female body; and offering their own vile bodies to be mouthed in turn.

— Instruction and Advice for the Young Bride, Ruth Smythers, 1894

== Bibliography ==
- James A. Brundage, Law, sex, and Christian society in medieval Europe, American Council of Learned Societies
