= Liz Greenfield =

Dutch-born webcartoonist

- Born: 1987 (age 38–39)
- Education: Willem de Kooning Academy
- Occupation: Webcomic creator
- Writing career
- Language: English
- Years active: 2004–Present
- Notable work: Stuff Sucks

Liz Greenfield is a Dutch-born webcartoonist living in Manchester, England. Best known for writing the webcomic Stuff Sucks, set in her birthplace of Amsterdam, Greenfield also wrote the webcomics Steak and Kidney Punch and Swallow.

== Career ==
Born in Amsterdam from one Dutch and one US parent, Liz Greenfield studied animation at the Willem de Kooning Academy in Rotterdam. Greenfield began publishing her webcomic Stuff Sucks weekly in December 2004. Stuff Sucks was one of few story-focused Dutch webcomics of its time, as Greenfield's contemporaries predominantly drew simple comedic cartoons. Stuff Sucks presents the experiences of a group of eccentric friends in Amsterdam, and a fish named "Binky". Greenfield's website got over 8,000 visitors per day in 2006, and sold print copies and t-shirts on a webshop. After running for two and a half years, Stuff Sucks was eventually printed as a set of six CD-sleeve-sized issues.

After moving to Manchester, Greenfield wrote the commissioned webcomic Steak and Kidney Punch. This story, about a young girl and her pre-teen professional boxer friend, was made available on MySpace Dark Horse Presents, the Dark Horse Comics' online spotlight for new talent. In an interview with Comic Book Resources, Greenfield stated that after Stuff Sucks, she was interested in writing "subject matter less trivial than music snobbery and petty crime."

Greenfield started a new webcomic in the early 2010s, named Swallow, about a young woman who accidentally swallows her mobile phone in her sleep and finds that all its alerts are projected directly into her brain.

== Reception ==
Greenfield won a Clickburg Webcomic Award for Stuff Sucks in 2006, in the story category. The jury stated that Greenfield "charms her readers with pleasant characters and a streamlined drawing style."

In a review on Comix Talk, Stuff Sucks was compared with the works of fellow webcomic creators Vera Brosgol, Jim Zubkavich, and Drew Weing, being described as "slick, stylistic, and with snazzy monochromatic colouring." Comix Talk went on to praise the webcomic, calling it "a sharp, engaging fiction that grabs you from the get-go and leaves you begging for more the moment your eyes scan the latest weekly offering’s final panel."
