= Ugly Hill =

Webcomic by Paul Southworth

- Author: Paul Southworth
- Website: http://www.uglyhill.com:80/
- Current status/schedule: Completed
- Launch date: 2005-05-23
- End date: 2009-03-29
- Genre: Absurdist humor

Ugly Hill was a webcomic written and drawn by Paul Southworth. The titular "Ugly Hill" is the home town of its main characters. The webcomic has had several guest authors/artists, such as Howard Tayler of Schlock Mercenary and Kristofer Straub of Starslip Crisis. Ugly Hill has been lauded by the Web Cartoonists' Choice Awards for its character design.

Paul Southworth has been a guest speaker at two major conventions, the New York Comic Con in 2006 and Vericon in 2007. On March 29, 2009, Southworth concluded adding new content to Ugly Hill. Southworth later created the now-defunct webcomic Not Invented Here.

== Primary characters ==
- Eli Kilgore is a slothful, consistently unemployed blue dinosaur-like creature with a seemingly permanent five o'clock shadow (that is, except when he allows it to sprout into a full-on beard). He is kind, likable and intelligent, but is lazy, has nothing resembling a work ethic, and is prone to making bad decisions that result in unpleasant consequences. He is a fan of the heavy metal band Skulldrift, and via an unlikely series of events, currently fronts another popular band, Blöodsignal.
- Snug is Eli's pinkish-colored best friend who still lives in his mother's basement. His mother is never seen, but is portrayed as a domineering, controlling woman. Despite her overbearing nature, Snug depends on her totally even if he is terrified of her. He can claim a certain amount of legal notoriety since, by his own account, a landmark court decision has resulted in his being considered legally retarded when awake before noon. Snug has been shown to be slug-like in his sensitivity to salt.
- Hastings Kilgore is Eli's workaholic brother. He is 33, tan-skinned, wears glasses and an ever-present necktie (despite not actually having a shirt), has horns, and stumpy arms which Eli teases him about. He is work-obsessed, which leads to a very high-stress life. These factors have led to problems with his blood pressure, necessitating a strict diet, which he ignores due to his love of good food (salt in particular). He is a noted racist (against the minority of one-eyed people in the Ugly Hill world, once he is called a Two-Eyes Supremacist). Hastings has been married many, many times, but even he is often confused as to the exact number due to a variety of strange circumstances. He is constantly frustrated by Eli's inability to find and hold a job, but nonetheless supports him due to a feeling of family obligation, mixed with messages/threats from their mother. His middle name is "Aloisius", although he somehow managed to conceal this from Eli until recently.
- Peter Wipp is an intern at Hastings' office and a high school student. He has the appearance of an octopus wearing a hooded sweatshirt and a bowl haircut. He is a bright boy, often acts as the voice of reason, and is usually the most level-headed character in the strip. He often suffers from the pressure put on him by Hastings' workaholism. He also makes good pancakes, but not great ones. He recently had a minor flirtation with Goth/Emo subculture, but abandoned this pursuit when he discovered that he had the potential to become a successful syndicated comic strip artist.
- Elliott Krauthammer is a co-worker of Hastings' who is at best an irritation to him, often leading Hastings to act more extremely than normal. To wit: Hastings has attempted to eat Elliot on more than one occasion, as well as attempt to both get him fired for perceived workplace infractions, and to blow up his septic tank. For his part, Elliot is constantly attempting to dig up professional "dirt" on Hastings, saving up what he finds in order to employ it at the time when it will have the direst effect.
- Karl Kilgore is the father of Eli and Hastings. While Karl looks like a taller, thinner, mustachioed version of Hastings, his personality is similar to that of Eli: a slacker and mooch. He finds work to be "for losers" and has built up considerable debt via various means. Not long ago, he was carted off to jail after hiding in a cave in an attempt to elude bill collectors, but while there, he still managed to hire a professional killer to try to murder his ex-wife. He once escaped from prison when he heard of Mrs. Kilgore's attempts to get Eli to shave his beard. His absurd passion for stopping her endeavors to make Eli shave off his beard comes from a delusional conviction that his life was sent downhill when Mrs. Kilgore forced him to shave off his own mustache when they were together. Recently Karl was released from prison.
- Grant Sherman is Peter's history-buff friend. He is active in Ugly Hill's civil war re-enactment community. He is green-skinned, with orange hair, thick glasses, and a bulbous nose. Usually seen wearing his uniform. In addition to historical re-creation, Grant is a fan of pastries, and violent video games.

== Recognition ==
Ugly Hill was recognized with the Web Cartoonists' Choice Award 2006 in the "Outstanding Character Art" category and got a nomination in 2007 for "Outstanding Character Rendering".
