= Sergio S. Morán =

Spanish webcartoonist and author (born 1984)

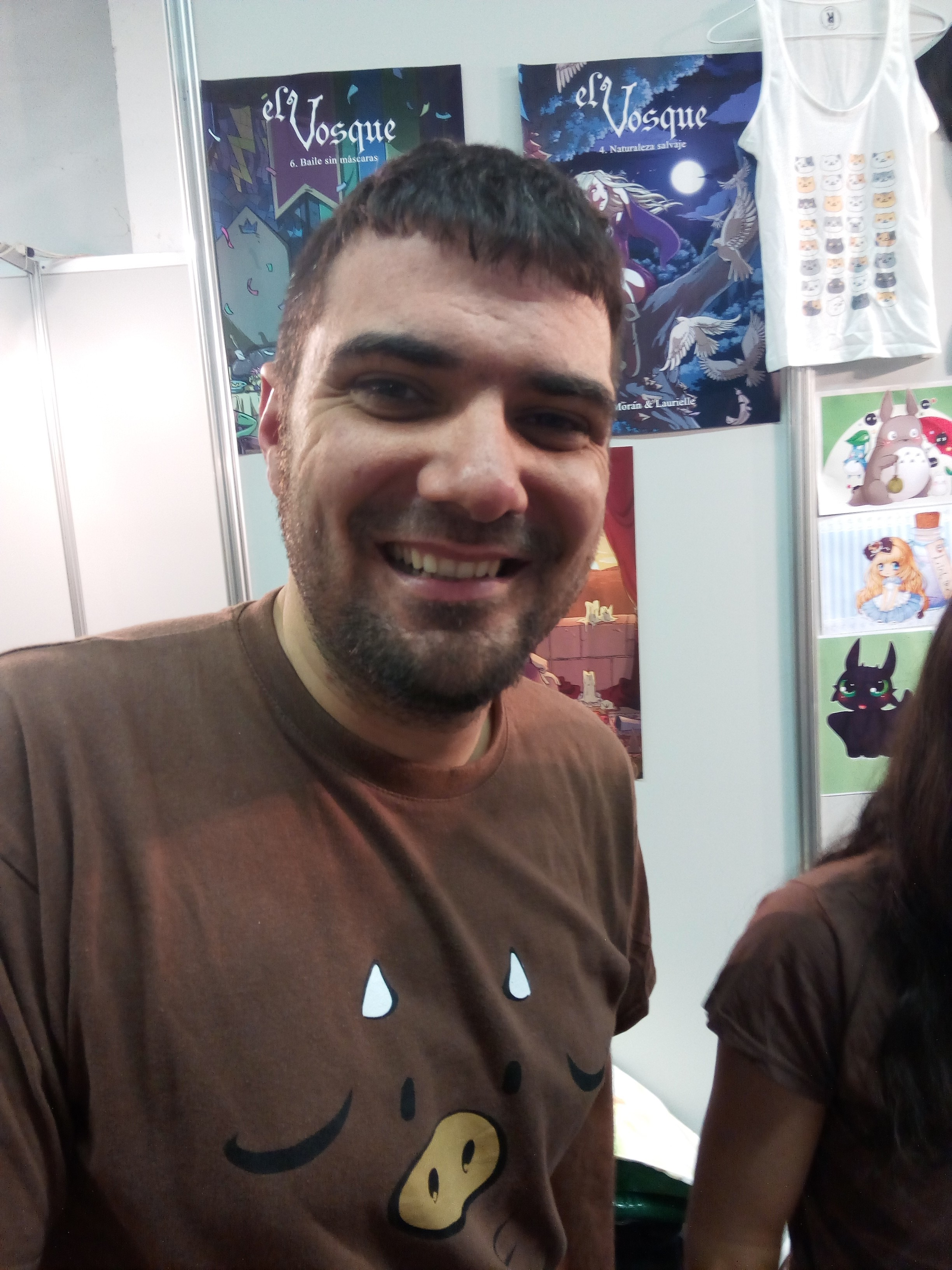
Sergio S. Morán in 2016

Sergio Sánchez Morán (born 1984) is a Spanish webcartoonist and author known for creating ¡Eh, tío! (literally "Hey, Man!") and writing El Vosqué. Despite having studied computer engineering, Morán found himself writing scripts for various comic magazines, and started his first webcomic in 2005. In 2016, Morán published the fantasy noir novel El Dios Asesinado en el Servicio de Caballeros ("The God Killed in the Gentleman's Restroom").

== Personal life ==
Sergio Sánchez Morán was born in Reus in 1984. He studied computer engineering, but eventually found himself becoming a scriptwriter for the El Jueves and Orgullo y Satisfacción comic magazines. Morán is married, and his partner works in marketing.

== Webcomics ==
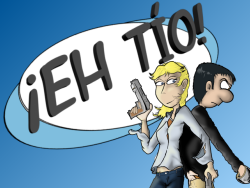
Logo of ¡Eh, tío!

Morán started creating the webcomic ¡Eh, tío! in April 2005, initially to write stories based on the experiences of him and his friends. This webcomic later evolved into a story about the adventures of a group of college students in a student residence. ¡Eh, tío! contains a huge number of pop culture references, and Morán updates the webcomic multiple times per week. Morán tries to balance non sequitur comedy and longer storylines, as he has found that the former are the most popular, while the latter keep his audience involved. In an interview with IGN, Morán stated that he "was lucky enough to start when there were relatively few people" doing webcomics, which allowed him to stand out.

Morán writes the scripts of El Vosqué, which started on 5 April 2012 and has a more serious tone than his first webcomic. To create El Vosqué, Morán collaborates with the artist Laurielle, who also creates the comedy webcomic Woodies. El Vosqué has multiple volumes in print, and was nominated for a Carlos Giménez award in 2018.

== El Dios Asesinado en el Servicio de Caballeros ==
In May 2016, publisher Fantascy presented Morán's novel El Dios Asesinado en el Servicio de Caballeros in Madrid and Barcelona. The novel contains a fantasy story taking place in a hidden underworld of Barcelona, which is populated by gods, ghosts and gnomes. Its protagonist Veronica, or Parabellum, is one of the few humans that know of this secret underworld, and she earns a living as a supernatural detective solving murder mysteries. El Dios breaks with the common tropes of the noir genre, in part simply because of its female protagonist. Morán stated that he decided to create Veronica "because there are strong and independent women who do not need to be rescued."
