= Elsie Hooper =

Horror serial by Robert D. Krzykowski

- Author: Robert D. Krzykowski
- Website: http://www.elsiehooper.com/
- Current status/schedule: Monthly
- Launch date: 2002 December
- Genre(s): Horror, Action, Sci-fi, Black comedy

Elsie Hooper is a black and white horror serial that began printing in December 2002. The strip originally appeared in the UMass Daily Collegian. Since August 2003, Elsie Hooper has been occasionally in the works as a motion picture in Hollywood, and has gained a substantial cult following on the net. Strips are posted weekly, often with additional gallery art or bizarre scribbles from the artist, Robert D. Krzykowski.

== The Serial ==
Elsie Hooper is set in sleepy small-town America, in the fictional town of Campbell Falls, and follows the progress of Ridley Hooper from the morning he wakes up to find the streets silent, sunless, and infested with strange creatures referred to as 'shadowmen'. The journey Ridley embarks on is subtle and very human – not to save the world, or even his small town; nor for the love of a well-proportioned heroine – he fights simply to be reunited with his younger sister, Elsie Hooper.

As Ridley searches the empty neighbourhoods for signs of life and gathers strange hints as to Elsie's whereabouts, he is joined in his cause by two eclectic companions – a young boy named Trent, who possesses an unexplained link to the thoughts and intentions of the shadowmen, and Arch Stenton: an old man with nothing left to lose, who seems intent on making his last stand. Together, the three move through the nightmare towards the place where Elsie is held by the sinister leaders of the infestation.

== The Characters ==
=== Ridley Hooper ===
Ridley is the everyman protagonist of the serial, and is by no means an action hero. We learn early on that both parents are dead, which may go some way towards explaining his determination not to lose Elsie to the shadowmen. He is not a naturally violent person – he mentions a hunting trip when his father remarked that Ridley 'was a good shot but [he] didn't have the instinct'. Despite his initial revulsion at the anger brought out in him by the shadowmen, Ridley soon develops the instinct through necessity and frustration, but retains his stoicism and dry humour throughout the serial. His fraternal instinct to protect Elsie translates naturally into protecting Trent, and this gives him new energy and resourcefulness when it comes to facing down shadowmen. He is also the only member of the group who sees truce as a possibility, and takes pity on fallen shadowmen.

=== Trent Gardner ===
Trent is the first fellow human encountered by Ridley, and quite possibly the only thing standing between Elsie and her fate at the hands of the shadowmen. Like Elsie, Trent has been selected to provide immortality for the invading force by acting as a vessel for their minds. However, this mental link has proven to be a powerful asset to the trio of survivors, as it provides an early warning system whenever the shadowmen turn their attention towards them. Aside from this, Trent also fulfils a role of companionship and optimism, not to mention little league standard pitching of grenades in a tight spot.

=== Arch Stenton ===
If you could imagine Commissioner Gordon with his back against the wall, a fire axe, and a score to settle, you might get an idea of the position Stenton finds himself in with the arrival of the shadowmen. Having been persuaded by his family to check into the hospital overnight for chest pains, the aging policeman awakes to find everything taken away from him – including his chances of survival when he is critically injured by a shadowman. Now he has no reason to hold back, and no desire to lose to the infestation, whatever the cost. Like Ridley, Stenton is a gentle person hardened by circumstance, but age has reduced his compassion for their aggressors.

=== Elsie Hooper ===
Not much has been revealed about Elsie, either in the narrative or from Ridley's mentions of her. She seems almost emotionless when she appears in the strip, but makes clear that she believes Ridley will come for her. Although the serial is centred on her, she is the only main character who does not give her own side of the story at any point, and in fact rarely speaks at all.

=== Father and Leader ===
The enigmatic and threatening pair at the head of the shadowmen's invasion play an unexplained double role, in which Leader is in charge of their operation, but Father is very much the one calling the shots. Although we know the purpose of their presence in Campbell Falls, we know very little about their identities or reasoning.

== Motion Picture Project ==
In early 2016, it was announced that an Elsie Hooper short film utilizing live-action puppetry was produced by filmmakers John Sayles and Lucky McKee with a planned festival release. The short was written and directed by the comic's creator, Robert D. Krzykowski.

== Origins ==
The serialized comic originated as a storyboard for a "backyard" movie that Krzykowski planned to shoot in the summer of 2003. While drawing storyboards in class at UMass, a student noticed the art and suggested Krzykowski submit the work to the student newspaper, The Massachusetts Daily Collegian. Krzykowski approached the editor at The Collegian about printing the strip in the paper. He didn't actually expect the comic to be accepted, but to his surprise, it was. Due to the serialized nature of the strip, the demand for a website grew from those who would miss the strip in print on their off days of classes.

Shadowmen came from a fever dream Krzykowski had as a child. His fever was so severe that he saw strange, gangly creatures stalking his neighborhood. He says to this day that it was the most terrifying thing he has seen in his life. Following this experience, he created heroes in his mind that would fight these creatures. From these early characters and ideas evolved the beginnings of a story that years later became the story of Elsie Hooper.

== Merchandising ==
Besides occasional artwork, posters, and prints, Patch Together toys released a limited edition statuette of EH's protagonist, Ridley Hooper. The 7" figure is true to the comic, in stark black and white, although it comes with a hot pink lawn flamingo that accents a sidewalk base. It is currently sold out.
