= Pibgorn (webcomic) =

Online comic by Brooke McEldowney

- Author: Brooke McEldowney
- Website: www.gocomics.com/pibgorn
- Current status/schedule: Daily webcomic
- Launch date: March 11, 2002; 24 years ago
- Syndicate(s): Comics.com (United Media) (2002–2007); GoComics.com (Andrews McMeel Syndication) (May 2007 – present)
- Publisher: Pib Press
- Genre: Fantasy

Pibgorn is a webcomic by Brooke McEldowney begun in early 2002. The title character is a fairy whose adventures span the fantasy and real worlds. McEldowney also creates the syndicated comic strip 9 Chickweed Lane, occasionally crossing over to Pibgorn, which explores stronger themes of sexuality and violence.

== Publication history ==
=== Origins ===
Pibgorn slowly evolved over the years after McEldowney had begun 9 Chickweed Lane, wherein Edda would occasionally have flights of fancy where she appeared as a prototype Pibgorn on rare occasions. He finally started adapting the idea into a proposed spin-off entitled The Titans, which was rejected by syndicate editors, in 2000. These proposed strips and accompanying sketches were presented on the Pibgorn website in 2005 during one of McEldowney's hiatuses from the strip.

Titans would have been a gag-a-day format strip, in which Pibgorn (named Oola Inch here), disenchanted with her expected role as a fairy, usually would break away from her regular routine to wax philosophical. Unfortunately, Oola was also one of life's losers, her dialogues often resulting in misfortune, such as having a Magic 8 Ball roll over her, or nearly being eaten by whatever animal she's conversing with (a spider, a duckling, etc.). The strips also showed a darker side to her character, as in addition to managing dewdrops, her responsibilities include serving as the "voices-in-my-head" of disgruntled government employees, driving one to attempted homicide on at least one occasion.

The final set of proposal strips showed Oola running afoul of Prince Crewth and Gaggot, here named Prince Grabstein and Rhune, when she petitions to leave "dewdrop brigade" and become a stand-up comedian. Unable to tell if she's laughing with him or at him, Grabstein outlaws laughter altogether and sets Luciano after Oola, only for the fly to fall in love with her. These situations were later recycled as part of the early Pibgorn story arcs.

=== Format ===
Geoff, Pibgorn, and Drusilla exit a nightclub in the beginning of the story "Mozart and the Demon Lover".

Until April 18, 2007, Pibgorn was published on internet by United Feature Syndicate on their Comics.com website. It has also been published as a graphic novel, Pibgorn: The Girl in the Coffee Cup, which was released in October 2006. Other releases include A Midsummer Night's Dream, The Poltergeist in the Piano, and The Borgia Cantus. Possibly because of graphic novel considerations, Pibgorn is characterized by involved story arcs which may seem better suited to a graphic novel than a daily comic, and it is also notable for its creative use of color and large format, together with strong themes of violence (explicit) and sexuality (generally implicit), attributes not usually associated with daily print comics. The artist has made the point that he wants to create a story without worrying about the editors of family newspapers.

Pibgorn originally ran daily Monday through Saturday, but on February 8, 2006, it was announced that beginning on February 13, the strip would run only on Monday, Wednesday, and Friday. It ended its run on Comics.com on April 18, 2007, and resumed with GoComics.com on May 14, 2007. McEldowney stated the burden of writing two daily strips concurrently as the reason for the cutback. As of July 14, 2008, the strip began running 5 days a week, Monday through Friday; McEldowney indicated in his blog that despite time constraints, he wanted the story to move along at a brisker pace.

=== Discontinuation from Comics.com ===
On April 17, 2007, United Feature Syndicate announced through Comics.com that Pibgorn would be discontinued on the following day. Brooke McEldowney has indicated that United Feature Syndicate accommodated his request to be released from his contract in order to secure a new online home for Pibgorn.

From a letter from Brooke McEldowney to his readers:

With United Media's announcement that Pibgorn is to be discontinued, I have been inundated with e-mail, much of it agitated and distressed. I'm very sorry you had to get the news in this rather dispassionate way. That I may answer your central question forthwith, I've composed this response for everyone – so please forgive me if I seem impersonal.

PIBGORN WILL CONTINUE.

There. That is the main thing I wanted to say. Comics.com, however, will, as they have announced, no longer be the source. Nothing dramatic happened, really. I simply came to feel that the editorial needs of comics.com and those of Pibgorn were becoming more and more divergent and incompatible. For this reason I asked to be released from my contract with United Media in order to secure a new online home for Pibgorn. United Media, most graciously, and reluctantly, agreed. In short order I hope to get Pib back up and flying.

Meanwhile, you have seen the most current installments of Pibgorn. Hold that thought. We'll be back.

All best wishes, and thanks so very much for writing.

After the move to GoComics.com, the content became more risqué, including nudity and implied sexual content. For example, in the August 22, 2008, strip, Geoff is seen walking down the street, nude, with his bare buttocks on display.

=== Return of Pibgorn ===
Pibgorn returned to the Web on May 14, 2007, at gocomics.com, owned by Universal Press Syndicate. Continuing in its three-per-week format, the interrupted story arc was presented from the start so as not to confuse new readers.

In late 2015 Pibgorn switched to presenting an older series of WAHOO TERMINAL comics, which continued through September 2016. Afterwards, Pibgorn returned to its earlier story arc, but on an intermittent basis while presenting some experimental styles.

On August 17, 2017, McEldowney posted a note on Pibgorn's Gocomics page, explaining that he was still recovering from a stroke, and that in the meantime there would be a rerun of the storyline "Pibgorn and the Djinn of It", which began four days later, on August 21.

Pibgorn's last entry on GoComics was on Aug 9, 2024. It is unknown if Pibgorn will evolve from then as no new entries have been posted as of September, 2026.

== Characters ==
- Pibgorn: The title character, a fairy who is not satisfied flitting around when she could be getting into trouble instead. She is sweet, effervescent, charming and flighty, with a succubus for a best friend and a human for a sweetheart. She has a talent for trouble, a knack for friendship, and a magical kiss — the baiser de la fée, or "fairy's kiss" — which can effect miraculous healing or change the size of herself and others.
  She is drawn as a lithe young woman with simultaneously red and blonde hair, and insect-like wings growing from her back. She is neither clothed nor nude; her body is covered with varying shades of green, which McEldowney describes as being "dappled". She can however wrap her wings around her body, transforming into clothes.
- Drusilla: A rather manipulative succubus who is used to getting what she wants, she seems to have resigned herself to the fact that Geoff genuinely loves Pib rather than her. She has made it clear, though, that if Pib hurts Geoff, Dru will make her sorry. Their relationship has developed into an alliance bordering on friendship.
  Like Pibgorn, her body is "dappled", covered with shades of magenta and violet, but arranged to bare more, accentuating her bosom and navel. She has black hair, which she often wears in long tresses to cover her ears, which are stag-horn in shape, indicative of her status as a demon.
- Geoff: Pib's slightly geeky sweetheart, he is a former church organist and now Pib's and Drusilla's accompanist, having been ostracized from the community when Drusilla accidentally revealed her true identity to the local pastor. He is loyal and affectionate, and protective of those he cares about. Not a stereotypical swashbuckling hero type, Geoff nevertheless has consistently shown bravery in order to help save Pibgorn and others around him from danger. He is also getting better acquainted with the supernatural world and has on occasion been able to guesstimate a solution. He apparently holds a great interest in musical history, as he has shown a surprising amount of biographical knowledge about Wolfgang Amadeus Mozart.
- Oognat: The hair fairy—not as bold or adventurous as Pibgorn, Oognat nonetheless ends up in many of the same difficulties as her companion fairy.
- Thorax: Possibly a visitor from another galaxy, a guest character from 9 Chickweed Lane.
- Maurice: A field mouse, he has been a friend of Pib's from the beginning, and he tries valiantly to keep up and help where he can. When last seen, he'd apparently become the companion of a Humphrey Bogart-influenced ex-demon.
- Prince Crewth: The fairy monarch who was exasperated enough by Pib's flouting of the rules (the last of which he invented against some action Pib had already done and made it retroactively effective) to order her assassination. Whenever he reappears in a strip, it is usually to re-authorize her termination for some perfectly senseless reason, although he is often side-tracked by the appearance of Drusilla or some other, more intimidating presence. Indolent and proud of it, he is mind-numbingly bureaucratic and blind to the repercussions of his actions. He is drawn as a miniature satyr with a resemblance to former U.S. Presidents Theodore Roosevelt and William Howard Taft.
- Gaggot: Prince Crewth's oily lawyer/doctor, who seems to fancy himself as something of a power behind the throne, easily able to lead the prince around by the nose. Despite this, he often finds himself serving as Crewth's right-hand man in the various tasks set upon them by Drusilla and others, which inevitably results in physical harm to both of them. Because of this, his patience with his monarch would appear to be wearing thin. He is drawn as a standard fictional wizard or vizier, wearing robes and a long, grey beard. He is the most human-looking fairy to appear in the strip, without insect wings or goat-legs, and could pass for a miniature human.
- Luciano: a horsefly who is Prince Crewth's consultant and sometime court assassin, whose only weakness appears to be Pib. He proves to be completely unable to bring himself to hurt her, and instead falls head over heels.
- Henmellyn: Drusilla's daughter. She first appears on January 19, 2004, and subsequently "dies." She does not reappear until March 24, 2011, as a pawn in the hands of the demon Stan, who uses her to draw Drusilla to him.
- Stan: a hypermasculine satyr, half-goat, half-human, much in the image of the Greek god Pan. He appears in a storyline that started in the Pibgorn strip for March 24, 2011, with the reappearance of Drusilla's daughter all but drowned in a pool of lava in Hell. He is cruel, violent, extremely powerful, and seems bent on Drusilla's destruction, which he seems to accomplish in the strips for May 16–19, 2011. As of May 20, 2011, we learn that his plot involves Geoff in some way. (All of the above strips can be accessed using the date search functions at http://www.gocomics.com/pibgorn.)
- Nat Bustard: A gumshoe-type detective who constantly narrates his actions, reminiscent of Humphrey Bogart noir crime films.

== Storylines ==
Pibgorn has completed 13 distinct adventures to date, and has begun another. The story arcs are as follows, named as McEldowney conceived them:

- The Girl in the Coffee Cup (initially started on comics.com, then restarted February 19, 2002; the strip changed to color on March 11, the earliest strip in the GoComics.com archive). Pibgorn the fairy meets and falls in love with Geoff, to the annoyance of his girlfriend Drusilla, who Geoff learns is a succubus demon in human form.
- The Poltergeist in the Piano (started November 11, 2002). About midway through this story, McEldowney switched from a daily newspaper strip format to a larger format.
- The Borgia Cantus (started August 11, 2003). This story introduces Nat Bustard.
- Drusilla's Daughter (started January 17, 2004)
- The Internal Fairy Harvesting Service (started October 18, 2004). Oognat makes her first appearance. This story introduced Thorax from 9 Chickweed Lane as a recurring character in later story arcs.
- Mozart and the Demon Lover (started May 23, 2005, repeated with commentary starting November 9, 2011). Geoff and Mozart switch places in time. Geoff struggles to finish Mozart's Requiem while Thorax helps Mozart understand what is happening.
- A Pibsummer Night's Dream (started February 13, 2006) presents the Pibgorn Players, along with the cast of 9 Chickweed Lane, performing William Shakespeare's A Midsummer Night's Dream against a 1930s backdrop à la Guys and Dolls.
- Lena the Horrible (started March 21, 2007). This is the longest story arc, running for two years with over 400 strips. It takes place inside a computer-generated world created by a demon.
- Pibgorn and the Volcano on 77th Street and Park Avenue (started March 17, 2009)
- The Stone Coin (started November 23, 2009) is a departure from the canon characters and is instead an illustrated story that McEldowney wrote in 1988.
- Pibgorn and the Graveyard Shift (started January 21, 2010). Drusilla enters a repressed memory from Pibgorn's past that affects her actions in the present.
- Pibgorn and the Brunch with Death (started December 27, 2010)
- Pibgorn and The Djinn of It (started September 17, 2012)
- Romeo and Juliet (started July 29, 2013) presents the Pibgorn Players, along with a few cast members from 9 Chickweed Lane, performing William Shakespeare's Romeo and Juliet in its traditional setting with many 1920s references.
- Guy le Pain: Le Pain Guy (started November 19, 2014)
- Wahoo Terminal (started November 28, 2015): McEldowney revisits one of his early attempts at a syndicated strip that was ultimately rejected.
- Luda and Ut, or The Provenance of Pib (started January 14, 2019). McEldowney re-started this story on October 13, 2019, presenting it as a "text with illustrations" rather than a comic strip.
