= Multiplex (webcomic) =

- Author: Gordon McAlpin
- Website: http://www.multiplexcomic.com
- Current status/schedule: Concluded
- Launch date: July 10, 2005
- End date: April 10, 2017
- Genre(s): Comedy, Film Commentary, Film Criticism

Multiplex is a comedy webcomic written and drawn by Gordon McAlpin which ran from 2005 to 2017. The comic focuses on the lives of the staff of the Multiplex 10 Cinemas and the movies that play there. Originally envisioned as an animated short, Multiplex is visually inspired by cut paper animation and vector graphics. Three print collections of the webcomic were released from 2010 to 1017. McAlpin's webcomic ended in April 2017, and the series is to be rebooted in the form of a stand-alone animated film, titled Multiplex 10.

== Synopsis ==
Multiplex is a webcomic about the employees and customers of the Multiplex 10 Cinemas located in a fictional suburb of Chicago. The Multiplex 10 employs a large number of young adults and has a wide variety of customers: many of the strips revolve around how the staff interacts with their customers, while others deal with what happens with the staff after the cinema has closed. The series was set in real-time, and most strips include a date, making its many movie references more understandable.

=== Characters ===
The cast of Multiplex consists mainly of the staff of the Multiplex 10 Cinemas, with some of the customers having recurring roles in the comic.

Name	First Strip	Summary
Kurt Bollinger	#1	Kurt is at once the most immature and mature employee at the Multiplex 10, as he is often seen filling in for the largely absent managers when he's not behind a register, in booth, or concession. But when business has been taken care of, Kurt likes to make up games (in which he is often the only one willingly playing) to entertain himself and has been shown to be quite dangerous with a broomstick. He has been working at the Multiplex since he was 16.
Jason Atwood	#3	Jason is a sharp tongued and aggressive half Filipino who does not hesitate to speak his mind, even to customers. Jason's top five movies are The Incredibles, M, Throne of Blood, Why Has Bodhi-Dharma Left for the East? and the restored cut of Orson Welles' Touch of Evil.
Becky	#5	Becky is shy, intelligent, and slightly nerdy. One of the most versatile staff members, she, like Jason, is known to work as a cashier, usher, concessionist, and projectionist. She has a crush on Jason, although no one besides her seems to know.
Melissa Recar	#19	Melissa is a clever, worldly brunette who has seen in booth, working concession, and ushering. A recurring character known as Stalker Boy has a particular fondness for Melissa, even going so far as to live in denial of her long-standing relationship with Kurt. Her radio "callsign" is "Racer Asylum," which is (sort of) her name backwards.
Franklin Onassis	#21	Franklin is probably the most sane staff member at the Multiplex 10. He shares his name with the character from Peanuts and is often called in to clean up very messy situations. His radio callsign is Black Panther, after the Marvel super-hero.

Some recurring customers include Björn Lager, an obese white middle-aged man akin to the Comic Book Guy, a "Creepy Loser" who once applied for a staff position at the Multiplex hoping to be able to meet some of the theater's female staff workers, and a "Stalker Boy" with an obsession for Melissa.

== Development ==
McAlpin began posting Multiplex in July 2005. His brother Lawrence, a programmer, helped set up the website for him and later programmed the Multiplex iPhone app. When McAlpin began writing his webcomic, he liberally made use of the dynamic canvas size of webcomics, making his strips as long as they needed to be. McAlpin originally intended to create Multiplex as an animated short, but abandoned the idea and later decided to publish it as a webcomic. Visually, McAlpin was strongly influenced by cut paper animation and vector graphics, stating that "the flatness of it can be [a] beautiful thing." The writing of Multiplex was inspired by Archie, South Park, Clone High, and sitcoms like The Office and It's Always Sunny in Philadelphia.

In an interview with Newsarama, McAlpin stated that he is not fond of reading webcomics online, stating that print comics have four times the detail that digital comics have. McAlpin has worked in printing and publishing for most of his life, and stated "I love the weight to books, the design, the texture of the paper, and especially the higher quality reproduction of the art." A collection of early Multiplex strips was released in print in 2010 under the title Multiplex: Enjoy the Show. McAlpin noted that his webcomic's 500+ strip archive could be intimidating, and that a paperback print collection would make it easier for new readers to get into the series. McAlpin funded the release through crowdfunding on Kickstarter, setting a goal of $7,500 USD and raising over $12,500. McAlpin later suggested that he may have been the first webcartoonist to use Kickstarter to fund a print release. The book was published in September 2010 by Chase Sequence Co. Two more collected editions have been released since.

Multiplex ended its run in April 2017 and McAlpin began developing a stand-alone animated film, titled Multiplex 10. In order to fund the film, McAlpin raised over US$15,000 through Kickstarter. Multiplex 10 is set up as a prequel to the webcomic, featuring the characters as they appeared early-on. McAlpin also hopes to be running an animated series after releasing the film.

== Reception ==
Multiplex: Enjoy The Show received a positive review from The Chicago Tribune, which praised McAlpin's work for its "extremely detailed frames and multifaceted characters."
