= Sosiaalisesti rajoittuneet =

Finnish webcomic

- C and Plus commenting their latest creation: 'Why? Of course our code is thread-safe!'
- Author(s): Ossi Mäntylahti, Jukka Piira and Pekka Piira
- Website: http://www.sarjis.info/sarjakuvat/sosiaalisestirajoittuneet/
- Launch date: 20 October 2000
- End date: 1 July 2012
- Genre(s): IT, work-related

Sosiaalisesti rajoittuneet ("The Socially Challenged (ones)") is a Finnish webcomic written by Ossi Mäntylahti and Pekka Piira and drawn by Jukka Piira.

The comic is about a fictional software company and the IT industry in general. The setting is somewhat similar to Dilbert, but the style differs by concentrating more on actual nerd trivia and less on business stereotypes and zany interaction between characters. The comic was a pioneer of Finnish webcomics. Its site received over 250,000 hits per month in 2007 (in a language with 5.2 million speakers) and has been featured in Ilta-Sanomat, Iltalehti Online and ITviikko. Frequent visiting of the Sosiaalisesti rajoittuneet web site is regarded as a sign of a nerd behaviour.

== Characters ==
The more notable characters are:

- C and Plus are the main characters. They are typical computer nerds who know software developing, games and hardware programming inside and out, but have little or no interest in the 'real' world. Together they are C plus Plus, a pun on C++. Originally, both were single, but recently C has started dating Laura, a female computer game nerd who frequently beats him at games. Plus, on the other hand, is every now and then engaged with Ginger.
- Iipee (I.P.) is the company's errand girl. She is a fashionable modern woman with little interest for computers or 'nerdy stuff'. Her name originates from the Finnish pronunciation of TCP/IP's IP part and her burden is to always end up with nerds. Her current boyfriend is an avid Star Trekker. Iipee likes to date both men and women, a characteristic that the nerds like to call dual-booting.
- eLisa is the company's director of marketing. She is an attractive young woman and frequently uses her features as an advantage to get her way in cruel world of IT.
- Pomo (The Boss) and VTJ (The Vice President) are representatives of the management. They seem to care only about money and treat employees as expendable.
- Blondisihteeri (The Blonde Secretary) is a typical, very cute and bubble-brained blonde, only male. Despite his utter lack of knowledge about tech, finance, or anything requiring actual thought, he has inexplicably good luck with the other sex.
- Kynäniska (The Pencilneck) is a completely hopeless nerd with no social life whatsoever. His only interests are computer gaming and leet culture. He often tries to pick up women, but usually fails miserably. Currently he's dating a young, sexy girl called Petra, who is a World of Warcraft addict.
- Petra is a 20-year-old girl with a great body, who always plays World of Warcraft, and uses macros to do her works, giving her more time to spend playing WoW. Petra is a violent woman with an extreme temper, which is a bad combination with her troll teeth prosthesis.
