= Town Called Dobson =

Liberal editorial cartoon in the webcomic format

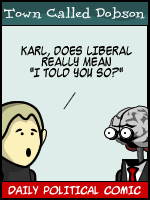
- Author: Storm Bear
- Website: towncalleddobson.com
- Current status/schedule: Publishes every weekday.
- Launch date: June 4, 2004
- End date: ongoing
- Syndicate(s): self-syndicated
- Genre(s): Parody, gag-a-day, editorial, political. serial

Town Called Dobson is a liberal editorial cartoon in the form of a webcomic written and illustrated by Storm Bear. The week-daily cartoon deals with being a liberal in red America. The cultural clash between left vs. right politics is the main focus of the cartoon and reflects the creator's life growing up in Dobson, NC.

It debuted on June 4, 2004. The first three strips were initially created as a one-day art project and was abandoned until the controversy over the Mohammad cartoons erupted. In the original strips, one of the main characters was named Johnny Allah. It was not until then that the creator reconsidered the cartoon and decided to go back into production and settling into a week-daily publishing schedule.

After a redraw of the characters, development of new characters, props and sets, Town Called Dobson restarted publication on March 21, 2006.

== Appearances ==
Town Called Dobson has been featured in daily newspapers such as the Greensboro News and Record and Winston-Salem Journal as well as newsweeklies including Yes! Weekly and Relish. The strip appears week-daily on large political blogs such as Daily Kos, My Left Wing, Bilerico Project, Blue NC, Diatribune and MyDD, and was also published on the Presidential campaign website of Congressman Dennis Kucinich. Beginning December 8, 2007, the strip first appeared in the San Francisco Chronicle on a trial run basis.

The 2007 Memorial Day series was included in the literary journal, Art In A Liberal Frame.

== Special series ==
The strip has an overall back-story where the characters have histories and personality traits and each character appearance builds on the past. Each strip can be read on an individual basis even though it exists within a broader story-arc. The strip dips into special series that deals with one topic or a fusion of topics.

The first series was a story that fused the start of the North Carolina Education Lottery and the aftermath of Hurricane Katrina. The story begins with the Four Horsemen of the Apocalypse bringing the plague of the lottery to the land. The town soon catches fire and is burned to the ground and a local Muslim is falsely accused of arson by George W. Bush. Bush then brings in Mort, the Horseman of Death, as the FEMA director. The rest of the story parodies the failure of government's response to the disaster.

The series, It Came From Cassiopeia is a parody of the real UFO religion, the Cassiopeans as chronicled by Pulitzer Prize–winning journalist, Tom French.

The Spicy Fish Prophecy deals with immigration and global warming through telling the story of emperor penguins set adrift after an Antarctic ice shelf collapse. The penguin's iceberg runs aground in North Carolina where a fundamentalist Christian church takes the penguins in to use them as slave labor to build a wall to prevent immigration.

Howl Qaeda, the latest story arc, focuses on George W. Bush and Senator Elizabeth Dole and their attempt to revitalize the Republican Party.

== Cast ==
The main characters are mostly drawn upon people the creator has met. Patrick is believed to be the creator in the story and Rakarah is the representation of the creator's in-strip and real world wife. Kiko, Herbal, Rockstar, Johnny Allah and Elwood Leroy Bible Thumper, Sr. serve as the rest of the main cast. The character's name and appearance visually tell the newcomer reader a short brief background of the character.

Other characters are either political, historical or fictional.

Most characters have evolved little since the start of the strip with the exception of Elwood Jr. In the beginning of the strip, Elwood Jr. would mimic his father on all issues, but since November 2006, cracks have been developing within the character to show a building unwillingness to accept his father's rhetoric at face value.

== Evolution of the art ==
The creator originally began drawing the comic using characters drawn as Little People toys produced by Fisher-Price. The third strip required arms and hands and the characters were redrawn with more of a manga style. During another redraw of the characters in early 2006, the creator developed a super deformed, Chibi style for the characters and that styling has remained since. All earlier strips were redrawn using this style that the creator calls Surry Chibi - clearly referencing the County in which the real life Dobson is the County Seat.

The strip does not adhere devoutly to traditional manga iconography. Since the cartoon is always in color, the creator tends to use gradients and other illustrative techniques instead of the black and white iconography.

== Sample strip ==
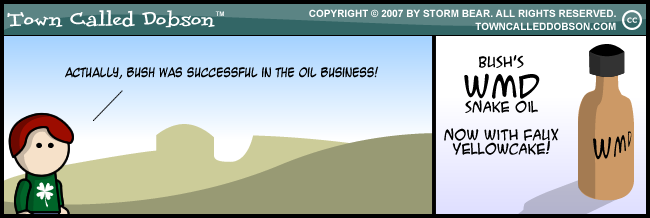
A sample strip about George W. Bush and his failed oil businesses

== Memberships ==
The creator is a founding member of Comic Kos, a group of political artists that publish on the political blog Daily Kos. The creator is also a member of the independent editorial cartoonist group Left Toon Lane.

== See also ==
- List of webcomics
- Dobson, North Carolina
