= The Morning Improv =

2001 webcomic series

- McCloud in a 2002 Morning Improv strip
- Author(s): Scott McCloud
- Website: www.scottmccloud.com/1-webcomics/mi/index.html
- Current status/schedule: Concluded
- Launch date: August 30, 2001
- End date: June 12, 2004

The Morning Improv is a series of webcomics created by Scott McCloud from 2001 to 2004. The series was entirely improvisational, as McCloud wrote one or two panels every morning. The title of each of the 26 webcomics McCloud created for The Morning Improv were selected by his readers.

== Development ==
Scott McCloud's The Morning Improv initially ran from August 2001 to June 2002, during which McCloud spent an hour or two every day of the week to slowly develop an experimental webcomic. For each webcomic in the Morning Improv series, McCloud picked a title that was sent to him by one of his fans and based the rest of the story around it. McCloud continued The Morning Improv in July 2003, after a year-long hiatus, using a slightly different mechanism to select a title. Rather than picking a title himself, McCloud set up a system to allow his readers to "vote" for one of ten submitted titles by donating small amounts of money to McCloud through BitPass. The series stopped in June 2004, finishing with a webcomic using Daniel Merlin Goodbrey's Tarquin Engine.

A few of McCloud's The Morning Improv webcomics have been critically praised. His October 2001 webcomic, "Brad's Somber Mood", combines existential despair and nihilism with references to Vladimir Nabokov and Ingmar Bergman in only 11 panels. In December 2003, McCloud created "But No One Ever Noticed the Walrus", which tells the story of an everyman in the form of an anthopomorphised walrus stuck in a waiting room, ignored by personnel. On the morning of the September 11 attacks, McCloud posted his Morning Improv webcomic as usual, describing it as a "tiny act of defiance."

== Reception ==
The Morning Improv won a Web Cartoonists' Choice Award in 2004 for the "Outstanding Use of Infinite Canvas" category. Dani Atkinson of Sequential Tart said of McCloud's viewer participation set-up that it had an "addictive pleasure", stating that "watching the daily rise and fall of a title in the polls has the same thrills as a horse race." Jaideep Unudurti of Livemint stated in 2015 that McCloud's experimental webcomics still work well over a decade later.
