= Buttercup Festival =

American webcomic by David Troupes

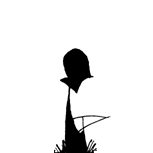
- "The protagonist ponders an unponderable durable pond." (author's caption)
- Author(s): David Troupes (alias Elliott G. Garbauskas, or "EGG")
- Website: Buttercup Festival
- Current status/schedule: Updates every Monday
- Launch date: 2000 February 17
- Genre: Humor

Buttercup Festival is a webcomic created by poet and author David Troupes. The comic's first run, from February 17, 2000 to January 10, 2005, began as a feature in the University of Massachusetts Amherst newspaper, The Daily Collegian, where Troupes was an editor during his college years. It was written under the pseudonym "Elliott G. Garbauskas." At various times during its first run it was published in the newspaper, on its own web site, and in other student newspapers and independent periodicals. The second series ran from January 28, 2008 to November 24, 2013. The third series started on February 4, 2019 and is presently ongoing.

Buttercup Festival's typical format is a strip of three or four panels, with the last often a non sequitur. Early installments feature simple two-value illustrations; as the author's skills matured, he began drawing larger tableaus and events.

The comic's humor is marked by whimsy, puns, parody, and a gentle, eccentric madness. However, not all strips are wholly humorous; many are intended simply to evoke a sense of beauty or wonderment at nature (especially Sunday issues, painted in watercolor and often lacking dialogue), somewhat reminiscent at times of Calvin and Hobbes.

Individual strips were collected in three print editions: Buttercup Festival, Irony is Killing my Soul, and Buttercup Festival: Unsinkable Affection for the World. As of January 2005, all are out of print. The author's other works include a short poetic graphic story called An Island People Go To, likewise out of print, and another webcomic called Green Evening Stories.

== Characters ==
Though Buttercup Festival has little, if any continuity from one strip to the next, and does not build on past strips, the same protagonist appears in every strip, and several other characters recur.

- The strip's protagonist resembles the Grim Reaper, dressing in black robes and carrying a scythe. However, she is not intended to be Death; rather, her appearance was a parody of the Goth sub-culture, and she never uses the scythe except occasionally to nudge things. On one occasion a cloaked figure with scythe was shown, his head a skull as death's is traditionally portrayed, though it is unclear if this figure is indeed the main character. The protagonist's defining characteristics include limitless optimism (she once successfully built a hot air balloon out of cinder blocks, using her "unsinkable affection for the world" as fuel) and an idiosyncratic perception of reality (in one strip, for example, she thinks that her Game of Life board is a city map). She seems to play various musical instruments, including guitar, trumpet, tambourine, and banjo. In one strip, she is also shown to have long blonde hair. It is also worth noting that the protagonist has been identified as 37 years old, and apparently has both a son with whom she plays "catch" and a daughter. In early strips, her actions are often highly destructive (both to her own well-being and to her surroundings).
- The voice of an unseen and unnamed character comes from off-panel in many strips. This character is frequently a foil for the protagonist, questioning his actions and correcting his misperceptions.
- Rodney the second-grade T-ball jockey is, as the name suggests, a second-grader with an aggressive attitude whose life revolves around tee ball.
- Future Boy is a jet pack-wearing boy who occasionally appears and reveals interesting facts about what happens in the future.
- An alien being called 'Cosmic Protean Intelligence' is sometimes featured conversing with the protagonist in an alien language. The reader gathers an understanding of what the being says from the protagonist's replies in English.
- A couple of strips feature a sentient balloon that believes itself to be human.
- A caricature of the musician Moby has appeared in several strips.

== Additional series ==
On December 21, 2007, Troupes posted a three-line message to the Buttercup Festival mailing list apparently announcing a second Buttercup Festival series:

Friends,

It has been awhile.
But there is news.
See the website.

EGG

On that day, Troupes's front page at buttercupfestival.com featured a reference to "Buttercup Festival Series II" set to launch January 28, 2008. Buttercup Festival Series II updated until 2013 on an unfixed schedule; typically, new comics appeared on a Monday, about once every two weeks. Series II was generally more visually oriented, featuring elaborate outdoor backgrounds and neatly written, minimalist dialogue.

On November 4, 2013, Troupes announced that "Buttercup Festival Series II" had come to an end, but that the comic would absolutely make a comeback.

On February 3, 2019, David Troupes announced that Buttercup Festival was back, and on February 4, 2019, he posted the first strip of "Buttercup Festival Series 3".
