= Snafu Comics =

Webcomics site

- Website type: Comics
- Owner: David Stanworth

Snafu Comics is a webcomics site maintained by David Stanworth. It serves as the home of several comics, including Stanworth's own creations, as well as those of other artists.

== Comics ==
=== Comics by Stanworth ===
==== Snafu Comics ====
This is Stanworth's original series, which is video-game-themed. The content and art style have changed over time; Stanworth says he alters it "every week."

=== Comics by Bleedman ===
==== PowerPuff Girls Doujinshi ====
A sequel that takes place 5 years after the original Powerpuff Girls. This comic was the "Outstanding Superhero Comic" and "Outstanding Character Art" winner on the Web Cartoonists' Choice Awards in 2005.
