= 1946 in comics =

Notable events of 1946 in comics.

== Events and publications ==
=== January ===
- January 6: Hildie and the Kid Gang, by Will Eisner.
- January 23: In Italy, the first number of Albi dell’intrepido by Editrice Universo, is published.
- Captain America Comics (1941 series) #52 - Timely Comics
- Joker Comics (1942 series) #21 - Timely Comics
- Marvel Mystery Comics (1939 series) #68 - Timely Comics
- In Walt Disney's Comics and Stories Carl Barks' Donald Duck story Donald tames his temper is first published.

=== February ===
- February 2: Jean Dulieu's Paulus de Boskabouter (Paulus the woodgnome) debuts in Het Vrije Volk.
- February 7: Buth's Thomas Pips makes its debut in Het Volk.
- Captain Aero Comics (1941 series) #25 - Helnit Publishing
- Captain America Comics (1941 series) #53 - Timely Comics
- Marvel Mystery Comics (1939 series) #69 - Timely Comics

=== March ===
- March 1: The National Cartoonists Society is established, along with the annual award, the Billy DeBeck Memorial Award, which will be renamed the Reuben Award in 1954.
- March 3: Milton Caniff's Male Call comes to its conclusion after three years of newspaper publication.
- March 4: Alex Raymond's Rip Kirby makes its debut. with The Chip Faraday Murder. The series will run until 1996.
- March 12: The first issue of the comics magazine Treasure Chest is published.
- March 24: Will Eisner's The Spirit story The Last Trolley aka The Man who Killed the Spirit is first published.
- Captain America Comics (1941 series) #54 - Timely Comics
- Marvel Mystery Comics (1939 series) #70 - Timely Comics
- Young Allies Comics (1941 series) #19 - Timely Comics
- Master Ice-Fisher by Carl Barks, in Walt Disney's Comics and Stories.

=== April ===
- April 15: Ed Dodd's newspaper comic Mark Trail is first published in the New York Post.
- April 22: First publication of Machiko Hasegawa's manga series Sazae-san in Fukunichi Shimbun.
- Captain America Comics (1941 series) #55 - Timely Comics
- Human Torch Comics (1940 series) #22 - Timely Comics
- Joker Comics (1942 series) #22 - Timely Comics
- Marvel Mystery Comics (1939 series) #71 - Timely Comics
- Sub-Mariner Comics (1941 series) #19 - Timely Comics
- The Hicks formula, by Alex Raymond, second adventure of Rip Kirby.

=== May ===
- May 12: Andrea Lavezzolo and Edgardo dell'Acqua's comic strip Gim Toro makes its debut.
- May 15: Willy Vandersteen's Suske en Wiske story De Sprietatoom is first published. Halfway the story Lambik makes his debut.
- Captain America Comics (1941 series) #56 - Timely Comics
- Marvel Mystery Comics (1939 series) #72 - Timely Comics
- The first number of Albi d’Oro (Golden albums), anthological magazine edited by Mondadori, centered moreover on the Disney comics.

=== June ===
- In Al Capp's Li'l Abner the character Lena the Hyena is introduced. "The world's ugliest woman" is an unseen character who is always obscured from view, but characters react in horror to her ugliness. Her face will finally be revealed five months later.
- All-Winners Comics (1941 series) #18 - Timely Comics
- Cat-Man Comics (1941 series) #31 - Helnit Publishing
- Joker Comics (1942 series) #23 - Timely Comics
- Marvel Mystery Comics (1939 series) #73 - Timely Comics
- Sub-Mariner Comics (1941 series) #20 - Timely Comics
- Suspense Comics (1943 series) #11 - Continental Magazines
- In the Rip Kirby story Liquid murder, by Alex Raymond Rip Kirby meets his nemesis, the Mangler.

=== July ===
- July 5: Hans G. Kresse's Eric de Noorman debuts in Het Laatste Nieuws.
- July 7: The first episode of the newspaper comic Priscilla's Pop by Al Vermeer appears in print.
- July 14: In Will Eisner's The Spirit the recurring villain Octopus makes his debut.
- July 15: The first issue of Fantax magazine is published. The character, by Marcel Navarro and Pierre Mouchot, had debuted two months earlier on Paris-Monde Illustré.
- Captain America Comics (1941 series) #57 - Timely Comics
- Human Torch Comics (1940 series) #23 - Timely Comics
- Marvel Mystery Comics (1939 series) #74 - Timely Comics
- In the French weekly magazine Vaillant, organ of MJCF, the first adventure of the pilot Bob Mallard starts serialisation, scripted by Henry Bourdens and drawn by Rémy Bourlès.

=== August ===
- August 1: Willy Vandersteen's De Vrolijke Bengels (1946-1954) makes its debut in Ons Volkske.
- August 12: The Buck Rogers story Battle on the Moon starts serialisation.
- August 26: In Chester Gould's Dick Tracy Breathless Mahoney is killed.
- Captain Aero Comics (1941 series) #26 - Helnit Publishing, Final Issue
- Cat-Man Comics (1941 series) #32 - Helnit Publishing, Final Issue
- Green Mask (1945 series) #5 - Fox Feature Syndicate
- Marvel Mystery Comics (1939 series) #75 - Timely Comics

=== September ===
- September 2: The Chicago Tribune Syndicate publishes the first episode of Aggie Mack by Hal Rasmusson.
- September 7: The first number of Albi dell’ardimento (Bravery albums), an anthological magazine is published, edited by Edizioni Alpe, centering on Western comics.
- September 9: Honey and Hank, aka Elsworth by Bernard Segal, aka Seeg, makes its debut. It will run until 1958.
- September 20: The British comics magazine The Comet is first published. It will run until 17 October 1959, after which it merges into the magazine Tiger.
- September 23: The Mickey Mouse story Mickey’s menagerie, by Floyd Gottfredson and Bill Walsh is first published.
- September 26:
  - The first issue of the Belgian comics magazine Le journal de Tintin (Tintin) is published by Raymond Leblanc. The magazine will run until 1993. This also marks the continuation of The Adventures of Tintin by Hergé, which had been interrupted after World War II.
  - Edgar P. Jacobs' Blake and Mortimer by Edgar P. Jacobs debuts in Tintin, with their first story, The Secret of the Swordfish. This marks the debuts of Blake, Mortimer and recurring antagonist Olrik.
  - Paul Cuvelier's Corentin debuts in Tintin.
- September 30: National Periodical Publications is established, from a merger of All-American Publications and Detective Comics, Inc.
- All-Winners Comics (1941 series) #19 - Timely Comics
- Captain America Comics (1941 series) #58 - Timely Comics
- Joker Comics (1942 series) #24 - Timely Comics
- Marvel Mystery Comics (1939 series) #76 - Timely Comics
- Sub-Mariner Comics (1941 series) #21 - Timely Comics
- Suspense Comics (1943 series) #12 - Continental Magazines, Final Issue

=== October ===
- October 1: Jack Dunkley's educational comic Patsy makes its debut. It will run until 1951.
- October 21: After five months of playing with readers' expectations the previously unseen character Lena the Hyena in Al Capp's comic strip Li'l Abner is finally revealed to the audience. Her design was part of a readers' contest won by a still unknown cartoonist Basil Wolverton. The exposure finally launches his career.
- October 26: In the Italian Disney magazine Topolino, the SF series Saturno contro la Terra (Saturn vs. Earth), by Cesare Zavattini, Federico Pedrocchi and Giovanni Scolari is concluded. It had run since 1936, with a two-year break-up because of the war.
- Cesare Solini and Antonio Canale's Amok makes its debut.
- Green Mask (1945 series) #6 - Fox Feature Syndicate, final issue.
- Human Torch Comics (1940 series) #24 - Timely Comics
- Marvel Mystery Comics (1939 series) #77 - Timely Comics
- Young Allies Comics (1941 series) #20 - Timely Comics - (Final Issue)
- Ipnos il re della magia (Ipnos, King of Magic), by Gian Luigi Bonelli and Carlo Cossio, edited by Edizioni Audace is first published, an Italian imitation of Mandrake the Magician.

=== November ===
- November 15: First publication of the Filipino comics magazine Halakhak Komiks.
- All-Winners Comics (1941 series) #21 - Timely Comics - (Issue #20 was never released, and issue #21 was the final one.)
- Captain America Comics (1941 series) #59 - Timely Comics
- Human Torch Comics (1940 series) #25 - Timely Comics
- Joker Comics (1942 series) #25 - Timely Comics
- Marvel Mystery Comics (1939 series) #78 - Timely Comics

=== December ===
- December 7: First appearance of Lucky Luke and his trusty horse Jolly Jumper by Morris, in Spirou with the story Arizona 1880.
- December 12: In the French magazine OK, the first chapter of Arys Buck et son Épée Magique (Arys Buck and his Magical Sword), by Albert Uderzo is published. In 1946 he also publishes his first album, Les Aventures de Clopinard.
- December 23: Marten Toonder's Panda makes its newspaper debut.
- Marvel Mystery Comics (1939 series) #79 - Timely Comics
- In Vaillant, Nasdine Hodja, by Roger Lecaux, a sort of Robin Hood living in the Arabian nights’ world, makes his debut.

=== Year overall ===
- John Willie creates the Sweet Gwendolyne character in the erotic magazine Bizarre, published by himself.
- In Il vittorioso, Benito Jacovitti publishes a comic version of Collodi’s The adventures of Pinocchio.

== Births ==
=== February ===
- February 20: Norbert Morandière, aka Norma, French comics artist (Capitaine Apache, Souvenirs de la Pendule, Hazel et Ogan), (d. 2021).

=== May ===
- May 13: Marv Wolfman, American comic book writer (Teen Titans, Spider-Man, Daredevil).

=== November ===
- November 12: Kazuyoshi Torii, Japanese manga artist, (d. 2022).
- November 29: Carlos Leopardi, Argentine comics artist (Atila, worked on Nippur de Lagash), (d. 2004).

== Deaths ==
=== January ===
- January 2: O'Galop, French painter, illustrator, graphic designer, animator and comics artist (Le Supplice de la Roue, Fifi Céleri), dies at age 78.
- March 2: Don Newhouse, British comics artist (Bertie Blobbs, comics based on Charlie Chaplin, continued Pitch and Toss, Our Saucy Shipwrecked Mariners), dies at age 62.

=== March ===
- March 29: Benjamin Kilvert, A.K.A. Benjamin Cory, American illustrator, painter and comics artist (Muffy Shuffles), dies at age 66.

=== June ===
- June 15: Charles Forbell, American comics artist (Naughty Pete), dies at age 71.

=== August ===
- August 3: Viktor Deni, Russian cartoonist and poster designer (made sequential propaganda cartoons and comics), dies at age 53.

=== September ===
- September 3: Constant Dratz, Belgian painter, poster artist and comic artist (L'Étrange Aventure de Tom-Tom aux Amériques), dies at age 71.
- September 16: Francisque Poulbot, French illustrator and cartoonist, dies at age 67.

=== October ===
- October 5: Monte Crews, American illustrator and comic artist (The Mysterious Family Next Door), dies at age 88.
- October 24: Dmitry Moor, Russian artist, poster designer and cartoonist, dies at age 62.

=== Specific date unknown ===
- Albert Lanmour, French illustrator and comics artist (Les Années de Service de Théodore Tiroflan, Le Hoquet d'Hector Boyaux), dies at age 58 or 59.
- Red W. Shellcope, American comics artist (Jimmie the Messenger Boy), dies at age 66 or 67.

== Initial appearances by character name ==
- Fantax, created by Marcel Navarro and Pierre Mouchot.
- Lambik by Willy Vandersteen.
- Morgaine le Fey in Batman #36 - DC Comics
