= Newspaper Enterprise Association =

American editorial column and comic strip newspaper syndication service

- Type: Print syndication
- Founded: 1902; 124 years ago; began syndicating in 1907
- Founder: E. W. Scripps
- Headquarters: United States, Chicago
- Key people: Charles N. Landon; Frank Rostock; Boyd Lewis; Murray Olderman
- Services: editorial columns and comic strips
- Parent: E. W. Scripps Company (1902–1978); United Media (1978–2011); Universal Uclick/Andrews McMeel Syndication (2011–present)
- Website: syndication.andrewsmcmeel.com/nea

The Newspaper Enterprise Association (NEA) is an editorial column and comic strip newspaper syndication service based in the United States and established in 1902. The oldest syndicate still in operation, the NEA was originally a secondary news service to the Scripps Howard News Service; it later evolved into a general syndicate best known for syndicating the comic strips Alley Oop, Our Boarding House, Freckles and His Friends, The Born Loser, Frank and Ernest, and Captain Easy / Wash Tubbs; in addition to an annual Christmas comic strip. Along with United Feature Syndicate, the NEA was part of United Media from 1978 to 2011, and is now a division of Andrews McMeel Syndication. The NEA once selected college All-America teams, and presented awards in professional football and professional basketball.

== Corporate history ==
On June 2, 1902, the Newspaper Enterprise Association, based in Cleveland, Ohio, started as a news report service for different Scripps-owned newspapers. It started selling content to non-Scripps owned newspapers in 1907, and by 1909, it became a more general syndicate, offering comics, pictures and features as well.

NEA moved headquarters from Cleveland to Chicago in 1915, with an office in San Francisco. NEA rapidly grew and delivered content to 400 newspapers in 1920. At that time, it had some 100 features available.

From 1918 to 1928, Major League Baseball umpire Billy Evans served as NEA's sports editor and produced a syndicated sports column titled Billy Evans Says. His staff featured well-known sportswriters Jimmy Powers and Joe Williams.

Alfred O. Andersson was general manager of the NEA from 1919 to 1921.

By 1930, NEA had about 700 client newspapers.

In 1934 and 1935, Mary Margaret McBride was the women's page editor for the NEA.

Boyd Lewis became the executive editor of the NEA service in 1945; he was president in 1968. Writer Russell R. Winterbotham was fiction editor of the NEA throughout the 1940s and 1950s.

Sports cartoonist and writer Murray Olderman had a long association with NEA. Firstly, his columns and cartoons were syndicated by the agency. He officially joined the company in 1952; becoming its sports editor in 1964; executive editor in 1968; and a contributing editor in 1971. He was the founder of the Jim Thorpe Trophy, for the National Football League's Most Valuable Player, and distributed by the NEA. He also founded the NEA All-Pro team in 1954, which ran through 1992. Although Olderman "retired" in 1987, he was active until the news service was overtaken by a larger corporation.

In 1968, the NEA was offering about 75 features to more than 750 client newspapers.

In the 1970s, Ira Berkow was sports editor for the NEA.

In May 1978 the Scripps Company merged its two syndication arms, NEA and United Feature Syndicate (established by Scripps in 1919), to form United Media Enterprises.

On February 24, 2011, the Scripps Company struck a distribution deal with Universal Uclick (now known as Andrews McMeel Syndication) for syndication of United Media's 150 comic strip and news features, which became effective on June 1 of that year. While United Media effectively ceased to exist, Scripps still maintains copyrights and intellectual property rights.

== Comic strips ==
The NEA's earliest successful comic strip was A.D. Condo & J. W. Raper's The Outbursts of Everett True (launched in 1905).

Early on, Charles N. Landon (1878–1937) joined NEA as art director. Founder of the Landon School of Illustration and Cartooning, a mail-order correspondence course that trained a generation of cartoonists, Landon personally hired some graduates to draw features at the syndicate. Counted among these successful students were Roy Crane, Merrill Blosser, V. T. Hamlin, Bill Holman, Chic Young, and Ethel Hays. (In the case of Hays, Landon taught her by mail and then brought her to NEA to draw syndicated features.)

Cartoonist Gene Ahern moved to Cleveland in 1914 to work on staff for the NEA as a sportswriter and artist, initially inking comic drawings for $18 a week. He worked on such strips as Dream Dope, Fathead Fritz, Sporty Sid and his Pals, Taking Her to the Ball Game, and Ain't Nature Wonderful. In 1915, he introduced Squirrel Food, later known as Otto Auto and then Balmy Benny before returning to its original title.

In May 1915, Landon hired Merrill Blosser to work at NEA. Blosser was 23 when he began in the NEA art department, initially doing cartoons based on news events and then drawing five daily panels. One of these, titled Freckles, began as a one-column daily gag panel on August 16, expanding into a full comic strip on September 20 when it was retitled Freckles and His Friends. One by one, each of the other panels were dropped. In July 1916, Blosser started another strip, Miniature Movies, which evolved into Chestnut Charlie, continuing until early in 1918 when Blosser concentrated exclusively on Freckles and His Friends.

Cartoonist Edgar Martin joined the NEA in 1921 as a cartoonist. While working in NEA's art department, Martin experimented with several strips: Efficiency Ed, Fables of 1921, Taken from Life, and Girls. In 1924, NEA was looking for a "girl strip," and several artists who had previously submitted strips were asked to resubmit them. Martin's sample was unsigned. When an editor examined Martin's strip and asked, "How soon can we get this artist?", the art director responded, "In one minute. He works here." Thus, Girls became Boots and Her Buddies on February 18, 1924, although some newspapers continued to use the first title.

NEA became a successful distributor of newspaper comics in the 1920s and 1930s. In 1921 Gene Ahern introduced the Nut Brothers, Ches and Wal, in the new strip Crazy Quilt. That same year, NEA General Manager Frank Rostock suggested to Ahern that he use a boarding house for a setting. Our Boarding House began September 16, 1921, scoring a huge success with readers after the January 1922 arrival of the fustian Major Hoople. The Nut Bros: Ches and Wal ran as a topper strip above Our Boarding House. Other long-running NEA strips that launched during the 1920s included Martin's Boots and Her Buddies, Roy Crane's Wash Tubbs, Ethel Hays' Flapper Fanny Says, and J. R. Williams' Out Our Way.

Popular NEA strips that originated in the 1930s include V. T. Hamlin's Alley Oop, Crane's Captain Easy, and Stephen Slesinger & Fred Harman's Red Ryder.

Bela Zaboly started at NEA as an office boy and eventually was a staff cartoonist. During the early 1930s he created the Sunday strip Otto Honk about moon-faced, dim-bulb Otto, who was variously employed as a private eye, movie stunt man and football player. Otto Honk lasted until 1936. Zaboly was an assistant to Roy Crane on Wash Tubbs.

Cartoonist Herb Block ("Herblock") moved to Cleveland in 1933 to become a staff cartoonist for the NEA, which distributed his cartoons nationally. While there, he won his first Pulitzer Prize in 1942 for "British Plane".

Dell Publishing's ongoing comic book series The Funnies (launched 1936) utilized a number of NEA strips to start out, including Alley Oop and Captain Easy.

By 1936 Gene Ahern was making an annual $35,000 at NEA, and King Features Syndicate offered to double that figure. Ahern left NEA in March 1936 for King Features, where he created Room and Board. Similarly, in 1943 Roy Crane exited the NEA (abandoning his strips Captain Easy and Wash Tubbs) for King Features to begin Buz Sawyer, a strip he would own outright.

NEA's Bugs Bunny strip launched in 1942 and was syndicated for 51 years. Al Vermeer's Priscilla's Pop was a long-running strip that launched in 1946.

Dick Cavalli's Winthrop (originally called Morty Meekle) debuted in 1955 and lasted 39 years.

Three strips that debuted in the 1960s and 1970s are still in syndication via the NEA: The Born Loser (launched 1965), Frank and Ernest (launched 1972), and Kevin Fagan's Drabble, which debuted in 1979.

The Newspaper Enterprise Association brand has persisted both under the United Media umbrella and now Universal Uclick/Andrews McMeel Syndication.

== Sports All-America team selections and awards ==
=== All-America team selections ===
From 1924 to 1996, the NEA was the selector of college football All-America teams. It was a granting institution in the selection of the NCAA Men's Basketball All-Americans teams in 1938 and from 1953 to 1963.

=== NFL awards ===
Beginning in 1955, the Newspaper Enterprise Association, under the guidance of Murray Olderman, poll NFL players annually for an All-Pro team. In addition, the NEA awarded a Rookie of the Year, a Most Valuable Player (1955–2008), and a Defensive Player of the Year (George Halas Trophy; 1966–1998). All were published in the NFL Record and Fact Book alongside the Associated Press, United Press International, and the Pro Football Writers Association All-Pro teams and awards. The NEA last announced an All-Pro team in 1992, ending a 38-year tradition of the "player's All-Pro Team". (The NEA list's successor, the Sporting News All-Pro team, currently polls players along with coaches and managers for its teams.) From the early 1980s the NEA All-Pro team was released in the World Almanac which was an NEA publication.

The NFL MVP award was called the Jim Thorpe Trophy and began in 1955. The Defensive Player of the Year was named after Chicago Bears founder George S. Halas and its inception was 1966, the Rookie of the Year award was named after NFL commissioner Bert Bell and began in 1964. In the early 1960s the NEA began awarding the Third Down Trophy that symbolized each team's MVP. That began in the American Football League and included the NFL after the 1970 AFL-NFL merger and ran through 1979. The Jim Thorpe Trophy was discontinued following Kurt Warner's win in 2008.

Olderman, the driving force behind the Players' All-Pro teams and awards, was also a fine artist and cartoonist. When the NEA news service released its stories on the annual NFL awards they were accompanied by artwork provided by Olderman to illustrate the stories.

== Syndicated columns ==
- Andrews McMeel Almanac — daily feature offering notable historical events, interesting birthdays, phases of the moon and intriguing quotes, facts and statistics
- Ann Coulter
- Ask Dick Kleiner by Dick Kleiner (1975–2001)
- Ask the Doctors by Eve Glazier, M.D., Elizabeth Ko, M.D, and Robert Ashley, M.D.
- Astro-Graph by Eugenia Last — astrology
- Billy Evans Says by Billy Evans (1918–1928)
- Celebrity Cipher by Luis Campos — decoding famous quotes
- Do Just One Thing by Danny Seo — eco-friendly ways to save money and the planet
- Georgie Anne Geyer
- Erskine Johnson
- Morton Kondracke
- Donald Lambro
- Kathryn Jean Lopez
- Gene Lyons
- Mary Margaret McBride
- NEA Bridge by Phillip Alder — on bridge
- NEA Crossword Puzzle by Dan Stark
- On Religion by Terry Mattingly
- Cokie Roberts and Steven V. Roberts
- Sense & Sensitivity by Harriette Cole
- David Shribman
- Sudoku Daily
- TasteFood by Lynda Balslev
- The Village Idiot by Jim Mullen
- Joe Williams on sports (1938–1940s)
- Byron York

== Staff reporters ==
- Hubert Baughn
- Milton Bronner
- Bob Dorman
- Roy Gibbons
- Marian Hale
- Steve Hannagan
- Maurice Henle
- Alexander Herman
- Harry B. Hunt
- Maxwell Hyde
- Jack Jungmeyer
- Harold Matson
- Norris Quinn
- Hortense Saunders
- Dudley Siddall
- William Philip Simms
- Edward Thierry
- Josephine Van De Grift
- Fred V. Williams

== Newspaper Enterprises Association strips and cartoons ==
=== NEA Christmas strip ===
From 1936 to 2010, NEA produced an annual Christmas-themed daily comic strip for its subscribing newspapers as a holiday bonus. They typically ran for three to four weeks before Christmas, with the concluding installment on December 25 or a nearby date. Strip historian Allan Holtz notes that over the years these strips featured regular NEA characters, adapted classic Christmas stories, and original stories with single-appearance characters.

Cartoonist Walt Scott was responsible for the Christmas strip for many years, starting in 1937, and then from 1950 to 1962. He illustrated the strip in 1937, 1949, 1960, and 1961; and wrote & drew it from 1950 to 1959 (with 1954 being a reprint) and in 1962. Hal Cochran wrote the strip from 1937 to 1943.

The 1942 strip, "Santa's Victory Christmas," had a World War II-era theme of conserving raw materials to further the war effort, and was drawn by Superman ghost artist Leo Nowak. The 1967 entry, Bucky's Christmas Caper, was written and drawn by famed comic book creator Wally Wood.

Phil Pastoret wrote the Christmas strip in 1971, 1974, and 1977. The Joe Kubert School was responsible for the strip in the years 1982 to 1985.

=== NEA comic strips ===
==== Current NEA strips ====
- Alley Oop originally by V. T. Hamlin; currently by Joey Alison Sayers and Jonathan Lemon (launched 1932)
- Arlo and Janis by Jimmy Johnson (launched July 29, 1985)
- Big Nate by Lincoln Peirce (launched January 7, 1991)
- The Born Loser, originally by Art Sansom (launched May 10, 1965)
- Frank and Ernest originally by Bob Thaves (launched 1972)
- The Grizzwells by Bill Schorr (launched 1987)
- Herman by Jim Unger (1975–1992 with United Feature Syndicate; now in reruns through NEA)
- Moderately Confused by Jeff Stahler (launched 2003)
- Monty by Jim Meddick (launched 1985, as Robotman with United Feature Syndicate, now syndicated through NEA)
- Shortcuts by Jeff Harris (launched 1999)

The following strips were inherited from Universal Uclick in 2011 and added to the NEA lineup:

- Cul de Sac by Richard Thompson (2004–2012 with Universal Press Syndicate/Universal Uclick; now in reruns through NEA)
- Heart of the City by Mark Tatulli (launched November 23, 1998)
- Reality Check by Dave Whamond (launched 1995)
- Thatababy by Paul Trap (launched 2010)

==== Concluded NEA strips ====
- The Affairs of Jane by Chic Young (September 26, 1921 – March 18, 1922)
- Annibelle by Dorothy Urfer (1929 – 1939)
- Ben Casey by Neal Adams and Jerry Capp (November 26, 1962 – July 31, 1966)
- Benjy by Jim Berry (1974–1975)
- The Bicker Family by Robert W. Satterfield (c. 1921–1922)
- Biff Baker by Ernest "East" Lynn and Henry Schlensker (1941 – 1945)
- Brenda Breeze by Rolfe Mason (1939 – 1962)
- Boots and Her Buddies by Edgar Martin (1924 – 1968)
- Bugs Bunny (1942–1993) primarily by writers Albert Stoffel (1947–1979) & Carl Fallberg (1950–1969) and artist Ralph Heimdahl (1947–1979)
- Captain Easy by Roy Crane (July 30, 1933 – 1988)
- Chris Welkin—Planeteer by Art Sansom and Russell R. Winterbotham (1952 – 1964)
- Dark Shadows by Ken Bald ("K. Bruce") (March 14, 1971 – March 11, 1972)
- The Doings of the Duffs originally by Walter R. Allman, then Ben Batsford & Buford Tune (1925 – 1928; moved to United Feature Syndicate until 1931)
- Eek & Meek by Howie Schneider (1965 – 2000)
- Efficiency Ed by Edgar Martin (January 2, 1922 – March 18, 1922)
- Fables of 1921 by Edgar Martin (1921)
- Flapper Fanny Says by Ethel Hays (c. 1924 – 1940s)
- Freckles and His Friends originally by Merrill Blosser (1915 – 1971)
- Herky by Clyde Lewis (1935 – 1941)
- J. Rabbit, Esquire by Bill Holman (1922)
- Kevin the Bold by Kreigh Collins (October 1, 1950 – October 27, 1968)
- Kit 'n' Carlyle by Larry Wright (1980–2015)
- The Little People by Walt Scott (1952 – 1969)
- Miniature Movies / Chestnut Charlie by Merrill Blosser (July 1916 – early 1918)
- Mitzi McCoy by Kreigh Collins (November 7, 1948 – September 24, 1950)
- Mom 'n Pop (later The Newfangles from 1932 to 1936) by Loron Taylor and Wood Cowan (1924 – 1936)
- Morty Meekle (later Winthrop) by Dick Cavalli (1955–1966; 1966–1994)
- Myra North, Special Nurse by Charles Coll and Ray Thompson (February 10, 1936 – August 31, 1941)
- The Nut Brothers (December 19, 1921 – October 14, 1922) by Gene Ahern and then Edgar Martin — later became a topper for Our Boarding House
- Otto Honk by Bela Zaboly (early 1930s – 1936)
- Our Boarding House by Gene Ahern (1921 – 1984)
- Out Our Way by J. R. Williams (1922 – 1977)
- The Outbursts of Everett True by A.D. Condo and J.W. Raper (1905 – 1927)
- Priscilla's Pop by Al Vermeer (1946 – 1983)
- Raising Duncan by Chris Browne (August 16, 2000 – January 2005)
- Red Ryder by Stephen Slesinger and Fred Harman (November 6, 1938 – September 30, 1965)
- Robin Malone by Bob Lubbers (1967 – May 1970)
- Salesman Sam by George Swanson (September 26, 1921 – 1936)
- Short Ribs by Frank O'Neal (1958 – 1973)
- Side Glances (1929–c. 1961) originally by George Clark, later by "Galbraith" (William Galbraith Crawford)
- Snake Tales by Allan Salisbury (1970s)
- Soup to Nutz by Rick Stromoski (2000–2018)
- Squirrel Food / Otto Auto / Balmy Benny by Gene Ahern (1915–1921)
- Star Hawks by Gil Kane and Ron Goulart (October 3, 1977 – c. 1979; moved to United Features, where it ran until May 2, 1981)
- The Story of Martha Wayne by Wilson Scruggs (May 1953 – November 1962)
- Taken From Life by Edgar Martin (July 24, 1922 – February 16, 1924)
- Up Anchor! by Kreigh Collins (November 3, 1968 – February 27, 1972)
- Vic Flint by Ernest "East" Lynn and Ralph Lane (Jan. 6, 1946 – March 1967)
- Wash Tubbs by Roy Crane (April 14, 1924 – 1949; merged into Captain Easy)

=== Syndicated editorial cartoons ===
- Robert Ariail
- Bill Crawford
- Matt Davies
- John Fischetti (1951–1962)
- Herblock (1933–1943)
- Jerry Holbert
- Drew Litton's Win, Lose, Drew (sports)
- Murray Olderman (on sports)
- Rob Rogers
- Bill Schorr
- Jeff Stahler

== See also ==
- Newspaper Enterprise Association NFL defensive player of the year
- Toni Mendez
- Newspaper Enterprise Association NBA Defensive Player of the Year Award
