= Herky =

Herky may refer to:

- A character in the Jay Jay the Jet Plane children's story series
- Herky the Hawk, the mascot of the University of Iowa
- A comic strip by Clyde Lewis
