= Kolosso (comics) =

Italian comic book series

Publication information
- Genre: Humor/comedy
- Publication date: 1964-1966

Kolosso is the title character of an Italian adventure-comedy comic book series created by Mario Faustinelli. It was first published between 1964 and 1966.

== History and profile ==
The title character Mac Kolosso was presented as "a nephew of Hercules and Maciste" and was intended as an ironical parody of the Sword and Sandal film genre, as well as an attempt to repeat the success of Carlo Cossio's Dick Fulmine, another "straightforward hero" type. Several writers and artists alternated, notably Pier Carpi, Alfredo Castelli, Antonio Canale, Carlo Cossio, Carlo Porciani and Franco Palaudetti.

Originally set thanks to the ploy of a time machine, the stories eventually spanned from prehistory to future. Published by Casa Editrice Gli Amici in an eponymous comic book series, 104 issues were released until April 1964. The 105th episode was eventually published in 1971, in the magazine Ploff!.
