= George Fett =

American cartoonist

George Leonard Fett (July 7, 1920 - November 6, 1989) was an American cartoonist best known for his comic strips Sniffy and Norbert.

== Life and career ==
George Fett was born in Cleveland, Ohio, the only child of Hungarian immigrants Frank J. and Elizabeth Horvath Fett. He graduated from Collinwood High School in 1938, then studied at the Cleveland School of Art, completing his classes in 1941. He joined the United States Merchant Marine and served on ships in the Atlantic and Mediterranean. He regretted not having a chance to sail on the Pacific Ocean, but was able to sketch a variety of characters he met on the North African coast.

In 1944, he married his high-school sweetheart. Fett then attended the Colorado School of Art on a scholarship program. On their way to New York to pursue job opportunities, the Fetts stopped in Cleveland to visit family and decided to stay. Fett began an engineering career that lasted for decades. In 1961, Fett began pursuing his lifelong dream of drawing a comic strip, and had submitted several ideas to syndicates before Sniffy was accepted. Syndicated by Bell-McClure, it debuted June 29, 1964.

When the orphaned dog Little No-No became a major character after 1966, the comic strip was renamed Little No-No and Sniffy in 1970. Sniffy eventually left the comic strip and Little No-No evolved into Norbert. The comic strip was renamed Norbert in 1973. This was one year after United Feature Syndicate took over syndication of Fett's comic strip. Fett drew Norbert until his final daily strip was published on January 2, 1982. Winthrop cartoonist Dick Cavalli continued the strip until September 26, 1983.

In his retirement, Fett painted with watercolors and oils. He died on November 6, 1989, at the age of 69.

== Sniffy and Norbert ==
The inhabitants of Fett's comic strip world were, for the most part, dogs. The original title character Sniffy was named after Fett's own pet beagle. Other dogs included Caesar, Charley and Queenie. Clyde (a cat), Big John (a mouse) and other animals, birds, insects and plants were included in the strip as years went by. Eventually, Sydney and Cynthia (a boy and girl) were also included.

Little No-No, the future Norbert, was left on Sniffy's doorstep in January 1966.

A variety of marketing merchandise was created in the 1970s and early 1980s, including pencil cases, bags, T-shirts and beach towels, mainly for Japanese markets. Much of the merchandise is labeled with the Japanese name for the comic strip, Norbert Mac.
