= Clyde Lewis (disambiguation) =

Clyde Lewis (born 1997) is an Australian competitive swimmer.

Clyde Lewis may also refer to:

- Clyde Lewis (cartoonist) (1911–1976), American cartoonist
- Clyde Lewis (voice actor) in Citizen Toxie: The Toxic Avenger IV
