= Jim Thorpe Trophy =

Award for National Football League's MVP

The Jim Thorpe Memorial Trophy was an American football award presented by the Newspaper Enterprise Association (NEA) to the most valuable player (MVP) of the National Football League (NFL) from 1955 to 2008. It was the only NFL MVP award whose winner was chosen by a poll of NFL players. By 1975, the Jim Thorpe Trophy was described by the TimesDaily as "one of the pros' most coveted honors." In 1983, the Del Rio News Herald called it the "highest professional football award, period." Earl Campbell was the first player to win the award in consecutive seasons, capturing three straight from 1978 to 1980. Quarterbacks Charlie Conerly (1959) and Roman Gabriel (1969) won the trophy despite not being voted to the NEA's All-Pro first team in their respective seasons—Johnny Unitas was named to the first team over Conerly, while Sonny Jurgensen got the nod over Gabriel.

The award was founded by Murray Olderman, a sportswriter and cartoonist for the NEA. It was named in honor of Jim Thorpe, a professional football pioneer who was a player and the first president of what became the NFL. At the award's inception, Olderman sent ballots to every player in the league. Coaches joined the players in the voting process in 1975. Starting in 1987, the award became a joint project between the NEA, Jim Thorpe Association, and National Football League Players Association (NFLPA). Olderman also left the NEA that year and ended his association with the award. The NFLPA took over the balloting and added Pro Football Hall of Fame members to the voting panel in place of coaches.

The first recipient of the Jim Thorpe Trophy was Harlon Hill of the Chicago Bears, who was presented the trophy by NEA sports editor Harry Grayson in a televised halftime ceremony from the 1956 Pro Bowl in Los Angeles. In addition to Pro Bowl halftimes, subsequent years also saw the presentation televised on the final regular season weekend in either a pregame or halftime event. It was even on The Ed Sullivan Show in 1958. The presentation moved to the pregame show for the NFL championship game starting in 1961. In 1967, the winner was presented the trophy in a party at CBS Television City in Los Angeles for NEA's All-Pro selections, which was filmed and shown nationally during halftime of the Pro Bowl. In subsequent years, CBS aired a half-hour special before the Pro Bowl featuring the Jim Thorpe Trophy winner along with the All-Pros. After years of holding an awards banquet in New York, the ceremony was discontinued around 1980. Olderman and the NEA sought a sponsor. The Jim Thorpe Association of Oklahoma City, Oklahoma, took over the presentation of the trophy in 1987, presenting it at the existing awards banquet for their Jim Thorpe Award, which honors the top defensive back in college football. The NFL trophy was redesigned that year to feature a bronze statuette of Jim Thorpe.

== Awardees ==
Award winners
Season	Player	Team	Position	Ref
1955	Harlon Hill	Chicago Bears	End	
1956	Frank Gifford	New York Giants	Running back	
1957	Johnny Unitas	Baltimore Colts	Quarterback	
1958	Jim Brown	Cleveland Browns	Fullback	
1959	Charlie Conerly	New York Giants	Quarterback	
1960	Norm Van Brocklin	Philadelphia Eagles	Quarterback	
1961	Y. A. Tittle	New York Giants	Quarterback	
1962	Jim Taylor	Green Bay Packers	Running back	
1963	Y. A. Tittle (2)	New York Giants	Quarterback	
1963	Jim Brown (2)	Cleveland Browns	Running back	
1964	Lenny Moore	Baltimore Colts	Halfback	
1965	Jim Brown (3)	Cleveland Browns	Running back	
1966	Bart Starr	Green Bay Packers	Quarterback	
1967	Johnny Unitas (2)	Baltimore Colts	Quarterback	
1968	Earl Morrall	Baltimore Colts	Quarterback	
1969	Roman Gabriel	Los Angeles Rams	Quarterback	
1970	John Brodie	San Francisco 49ers	Quarterback	
1971	Bob Griese	Miami Dolphins	Quarterback	
1972	Larry Brown	Washington Redskins	Running back	
1973	O. J. Simpson	Buffalo Bills	Running back	
1974	Ken Stabler	Oakland Raiders	Quarterback	
1975	Fran Tarkenton	Minnesota Vikings	Quarterback	
1976	Bert Jones	Baltimore Colts	Quarterback	
1977	Walter Payton	Chicago Bears	Running back	
1978	Earl Campbell	Houston Oilers	Running back	
1979	Earl Campbell (2)	Houston Oilers	Running back	
1980	Earl Campbell (3)	Houston Oilers	Running back	
1981	Ken Anderson	Cincinnati Bengals	Quarterback	
1982	Dan Fouts	San Diego Chargers	Quarterback	
1983	Joe Theismann	Washington Redskins	Quarterback	
1984	Dan Marino	Miami Dolphins	Quarterback	
1985	Walter Payton (2)	Chicago Bears	Running back	
1986	Phil Simms	New York Giants	Quarterback	
1987	Jerry Rice	San Francisco 49ers	Wide receiver	
1988	Roger Craig	San Francisco 49ers	Running back	
1989	Joe Montana	San Francisco 49ers	Quarterback	
1990	Warren Moon	Houston Oilers	Quarterback	
1991	Thurman Thomas	Buffalo Bills	Running back	
1992	Emmitt Smith	Dallas Cowboys	Running back	
1993	Emmitt Smith (2)	Dallas Cowboys	Running back	
1994	Steve Young	San Francisco 49ers	Quarterback	
1995	Brett Favre	Green Bay Packers	Quarterback	
1996	Brett Favre (2)	Green Bay Packers	Quarterback	
1997	Barry Sanders	Detroit Lions	Running back	
1998	Randall Cunningham	Minnesota Vikings	Quarterback	
1999	Kurt Warner	St. Louis Rams	Quarterback	
2000	Marshall Faulk	St. Louis Rams	Running back	
2001	Kurt Warner (2)	St. Louis Rams	Quarterback	
2002	Rich Gannon	Oakland Raiders	Quarterback	
2003	Peyton Manning	Indianapolis Colts	Quarterback	
2004	Peyton Manning (2)	Indianapolis Colts	Quarterback	
2005	Shaun Alexander	Seattle Seahawks	Running back	
2006	LaDainian Tomlinson	San Diego Chargers	Running back	
2007	Tom Brady	New England Patriots	Quarterback	
2008	Kurt Warner (3)	Arizona Cardinals	Quarterback	

== Multiple-time winners ==
List of multiple-time winners
Awards	Player	Team	Years	Hall of Fame induction
3	Earl Campbell	Houston Oilers	1978, 1979, 1980	1991
3	Jim Brown	Cleveland Browns	1958, 1963, 1965	1971
3	Kurt Warner	St. Louis Rams	1999, 2001, 2008	2017
2	Brett Favre	Green Bay Packers	1995, 1996	2016
2	Emmitt Smith	Dallas Cowboys	1992, 1993	2010
2	Johnny Unitas	Baltimore Colts	1957, 1967	1979
2	Peyton Manning	Indianapolis Colts	2003, 2004	2021
2	Walter Payton	Chicago Bears	1977, 1985	1993
2	Y. A. Tittle	New York Giants	1961, 1963	1971

== See also ==
- List of National Football League awards
