= V. T. Hamlin =

American cartoonist

- Dorothy and V. T. Hamlin picnicking on a Texas beach in 1928. Note resemblance of Dorothy to Alley Oop's Ooola.
- Born: Vincent Trout Hamlin; May 10, 1900 Perry, Iowa, U.S.
- Died: June 14, 1993 (aged 93) Brooksville, Florida, U.S.
- Area: Cartoonist
- Notable works: Alley Oop
- Spouse: Dorothy Stapleton (m. 1926; died 1985)

Vincent Trout Hamlin (May 10, 1900 – June 14, 1993), who preferred the name V. T. Hamlin, was an American comic strip cartoonist. He created the popular, long-run comic strip Alley Oop, syndicated by the Newspaper Enterprise Association.

== Biography ==
=== Early life ===
Born in Perry, Iowa to Erma Trout Hamlin and Dr. Frederick Clarence Hamlin, a dentist. Vincent began drawing at an early age; he first drew the character that became Alley Oop at age 11. Four years later, his first cartoons were published in the Perry Daily Chief. At Perry High School, he went by the nickname Snick, which he used as his signature on cartoons he drew for his high school yearbook, The Eclipse.

=== World War I ===
Lying about his age, Hamlin enlisted in the Army at 17 to fight in World War I. He shipped out as part of the Sixth Army's Motor Transport Group, arriving in France where he served with the American Expeditionary Forces in 1918. Recovering from a poison gas attack in France, Hamlin began illustrating the letters of fellow soldiers, and a newspaper man he met in the Army convinced him he could make a living from his art abilities.

=== After World War I ===
After his discharge, Hamlin returned to Perry High School in 1919. He then attended college, first a term at the University of Missouri in 1920, followed by studying journalism at Drake University in 1922.

His college experiences ended after a quarrel with an art teacher, as he recalled: "Then the teacher took out my drawing and she stood up with it before the class and announced: 'Now here's a man with a wonderful talent and he wants to waste it on being a cartoonist!'"

He traveled around the US, working at various jobs as a sign painter, animator, window dresser, card writer, movie projectionist and semi-professional boxer. After employment in 1922 as a journalist at the Des Moines News, Hamlin worked for the Texas Grubstakers newspaper and the Fort Worth Record. His income in 1922 was $910.

By 1923, he was a staff photographer, cartoonist and writer at the Fort Worth Star-Telegram, where he created his first comic strip, The Hired Hand, and a sports feature, The Panther Kitten. Cartoonist Steve Stiles noted:

The job only lasted a year. It was the Prohibition era and Hamlin and a friend were discovered using the paper's engraving equipment to make counterfeit labels for bootleg whiskey bottles. Hamlin moved on to doing art for an oil industry publication and one day, while wandering through the desolate landscape of the oil fields, began musing about the dinosaurs who had once roamed through the very same territory. Hamlin also acquired a lifelong interest in paleontology through conversations with geologist acquaintances.

On December 24, 1926, he married high-school sweetheart Dorothy Stapleton, who became the model for the character Ooola in Alley Oop. Their daughter Theodora was born in 1927, followed by their son Jon in 1936. In 1928, he worked as a photographer for the Houston Press.

When the oil industry magazine went defunct, the Hamlins returned to Perry, Iowa, in 1930.

V. T. Hamlin's Alley Oop (March 19, 1946). Oop and Ooola time travel to a post-World War II party.

=== Alley Oop begins ===
In Perry, Hamlin thought about those dinosaurs and started drawing a comic strip titled The Mighty Oop. He was not pleased with his creation, and he destroyed it. A year later, he tried again, submitting Alley Oop to a small syndicate, Bonnet-Brown, which launched the strip as a daily, beginning December 5, 1932. A few months later, Bonnet-Brown collapsed, bringing the strip to an end. NEA picked it up, and it started again on August 7, 1933. Success led to a Sunday strip, added on September 9, 1934.

Dorothy Hamlin also worked on the strip, creating color roughs and contributing story ideas, including the important plot device of time travel that was introduced April 5, 1939.

Hamlin wrote and drew Alley Oop until his retirement in 1971. When Hamlin retired because of failing eyesight, Dave Graue took over full-time. Graue had been assisting Hamlin since 1950, and he had been drawing the daily solo since 1966, although it was co-signed by Hamlin. The last daily signed by Hamlin appeared December 31, 1972, and Hamlin's last signed Sunday strip was April 1, 1973.

From his studio in North Carolina, Graue wrote and drew the strip through the 1970s and 1980s until Jack Bender took over as illustrator in 1991. Graue continued to write the strip until his August 2001 retirement. On December 10, 2001, the 75-year-old Graue died in Flat Rock, North Carolina, in a traffic collision. The current Alley Oop Sunday and daily strips are created by writer Joey Alison Sayers and artist Jonathan Lemon.

=== Later life and death ===
The Hamlins moved to Sarasota, Florida, after his retirement. He wrote his autobiography, The Man Who Walked with Dinosaurs, and a novel, The Devil's Daughter. Four Rivers is his fishing memoir.

Dorothy Hamlin died in 1985, and V. T. Hamlin died from natural causes in Brooksville, Florida, in 1993, at the age of 93.

== Archives ==
Theodora Hamlin Dewalt donated the V. T. Hamlin Collection to the University of Missouri-Columbia Libraries on December 22, 1990. It includes 126 original cartoons and 436 personal and career photographs, along with newspaper and journal articles about Hamlin's work, contracts and correspondence with Newspaper Enterprise Association, personal and family papers, correspondence and memorabilia.
