= Boots and Her Buddies =

American comic strip by Edgar Martin

- Edgar Martin's Boots and Her Buddies (June 8, 1930). From 1926 to 1931, the Sunday strip appeared in this abbreviated form as a topper strip, positioned directly above Gene Ahern's Our Boarding House.
- Author: Edgar Martin
- Current status/schedule: Concluded daily & Sunday strip
- Launch date: February 18, 1924
- End date: October 6, 1968
- Alternate name: Girls
- Syndicate(s): Newspaper Enterprise Association
- Genre(s): Humor, gag-a-day, satire, adults

Boots and Her Buddies is an American comic strip by Edgar Martin that ran from 1924 to 1968, syndicated by the Newspaper Enterprise Association. Some newspapers presented the strip under the shortened title Boots. The character of Boots was variously labeled the "Sweetheart of the Comics", the "Sweetheart of America" and "Everybody's Sweetheart".

Martin grew up in Monmouth, Illinois where his father, George Martin, was a Monmouth College biology professor, and he spent three years attending Monmouth College, leaving his junior year to study at the Chicago Academy of Fine Arts and joining NEA in 1921 as a cartoonist. Martin found work in 1921 in the NEA art department, and that same year he launched his strip, Girls, which had a character named Boots. Girls became Boots and Her Buddies on February 18, 1924, although some newspapers continued to use the first title.

== Collegiate origins ==
Boots and Her Buddies #6 (1948)

When the strip began, Boots was attending college and boarding at the home of a professor and his wife. The "buddies" in the title originally referred to her college boy friends. The college in the strip was based on Monmouth College; Boots sometimes carried a banner with the letter "M". The town in the strip had numerous parallels with Monmouth, Illinois, occasionally displaying real locations, such as Sandy Mitchell's pool hall.

The Sunday strip began as a topper, positioned above Our Boarding House from 1926 to 1931. Because the strip had a large readership of college and high school students, Martin kept Boots in college for a very long time. With the strip's emphasis on fashion and beauty, Martin was sometimes invited to judge beauty contests. Paper doll cutouts with fashionable garments were a part of the Sunday pages well into the early 1960s. Associated topper strips were The Gooneys, Babe 'n Horace (started March 19, 1939) and Bootkins: the Little China Doll (April 26, 1936 to March 13, 1938). Interviewed in 1952, Martin gave some background on the strip and the way he felt about his characters:

Five weeks before Boots's friends read of her activities in their local paper, Mr. Martin has drawn her actions for that day and mailed them to NEA (Newspaper Enterprise Association) for distribution to 700 papers which carry the feature daily. This is almost an anniversary for the cartoon which was first read on July 1, 1921. At that time Boots was in college, and was a pacesetter for fashions of the day... Her creator said that either he or Boots must have been pretty dumb because it took her a number of years to graduate. Partly, he said, this was because he hated to marry her to anyone, and partly because during the 1920s she was a symbol of taste in clothes and fashion, and having her married might cramp her style as "Everybody's Sweetheart." Friends know, however, that she is now married and has a small son. The son, Mr. Martin says, is his only pal, as he himself has three daughters, all of them married, and a granddaughter. Actually, he says, the characters in a comic strip become a part of their creator's own family. Each has individuality and is bounded by propriety in things that can and cannot be done, the same as any individual. Of one thing the cartoonist is sure, and that is that a comic strip misses its point unless it deals with human things in a human manner. The best feeling of all, he thinks, is to read a strip and say, "Why that same thing happened to me last week!" What but a domestic situation with everyday people could last for more than 30 years and still have a circulation numbered in the millions?" Some fans are really avid. Recently Mr. Martin received word of one reader who has at least 30 scrapbooks filled with the activities of Boots, from 1921-1951, inclusive.

== Characters and story ==
Edgar Martin's Boots and Her Buddies (January 7, 1939)

- Boots Ruggles, "Sweetheart of America"
- Rod Ruggles, Boots's husband
- Davey Ruggles, Boots's son
- Bill, Boots's brother
- Dory, a white maid introduced after WWII
- Pug High, a red-headed teenage girl, who lives with the Ruggles
- J.X. "Bettem" High, Pug's father
- Eager Weaver, youth with crush on Pug
- Professor Stephen Tutt
- Cora Tutt, Boots's friend
- Opal, a black maid
- Ferdie
- Willie

In 1949, Editor & Publisher summarized situations in the strip:

In 1926, after monied brother Bill gave her a trip to New York, she got a new haircut, the "Boots Bob", which clicked nationally with hairdressers. She was, in 1939, honored guest, in sketch form, at the Yale junior prom, and her glamour brought artist Martin several assignments as judge of beauty contests. Boots picked up a chum, Babe in these days, and they had a strong following among the students. But as the original audience grew older, Boots matured. She was courted by numerous swains. It's like ticking off calendars to recall their names—Ronald Ross, Prince Franz of Grandalia, Jonathon Marlsboro Jones, Handy Andrews, the wealthy Cecil Livingston and Rod Ruggles. Boots's audience had apparently reached a new stage when Ruggles appeared on the scene. They liked him. They sent a cascade of letters asking for wedding bells, and Boots and Rod went to the altar, October 2, 1945.

In addition to keeping Boots in college for years, Martin also delayed her marriage for two decades. After Boots and Rod Ruggles married in 1945, their son Davey was born July 4, 1946. Another central character was Boots's close friend Cora, who was married to Professor Stephen Tutt. In 1937, Boots brought Pug to live with the Tutts after Pug's father, J.X. "Bettem" High mysteriously disappeared. Pug later became a member of the Ruggles family. Boots was also friends with Babe and Horace, the characters in the Sunday topper strip, Babe 'n Horace.

== Racist maid depiction ==
From the comic strip's inception until World War II, Martin included a black maid character named "Opal," who was depicted as a racist Mammy stereotype as shown in the example below. As "mammy" depictions became less socially acceptable in the mid-1940s, Martin replaced Opal with "Dory," a white maid.

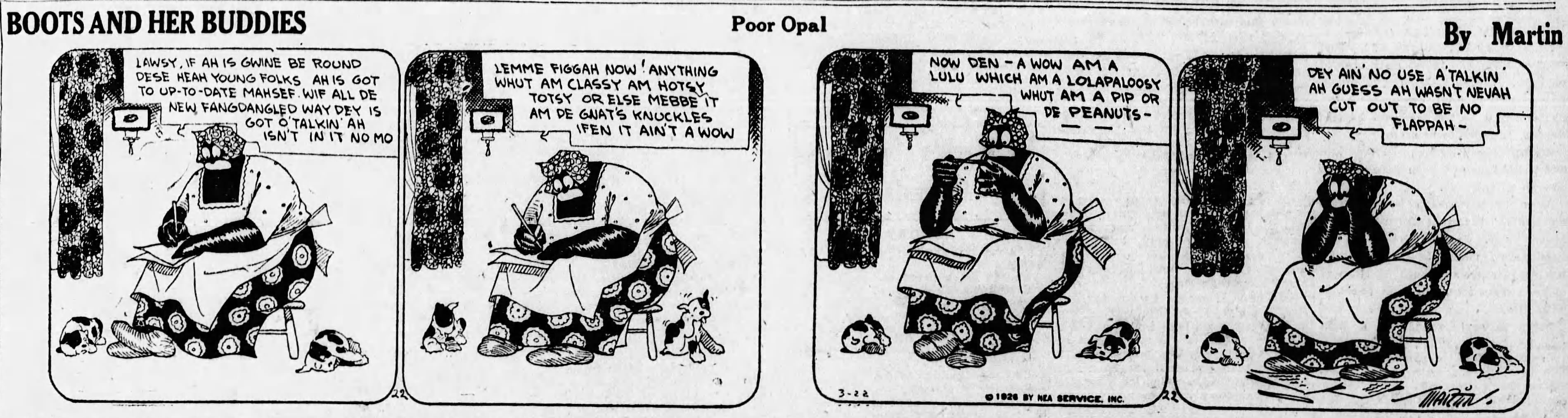
Edgar Martin's Boots and Her Buddies (March 21, 1926)

== Toppers ==
The Sunday page for Boots and Her Buddies had several toppers during the run, including: Girls Cut-Outs aka Girls Masquerade (1931 – Sept 2, 1934), Boots Cut-Outs aka Boots Fashion Show (Sept 16, 1934 – Oct 6, 1968), Bootkins - The Little China Doll (April 26, 1936 – March 13, 1938), Babe and Horace (March 19, 1939 – Oct 6, 1968) and The Gooneys (June 6, 1965 – Oct 6, 1968).

== Scripts ==
During the 1950s, the strip was written by University of Missouri student and English instructor Thomas B. Harris, who married Mary Martin, Edgar Martin's daughter. Harris submitted story synopses to Martin who passed them on to the syndicate. Not until NEA gave a go-ahead did Harris write the full scripts with dialogue. At the University of Missouri-Columbia, Harris was promoted from administrative assistant to assistant dean to associate dean of the College of Arts and Science (from 1954 until 1984). An advisor to the Provost's Office (1984–1988) until his 1988 retirement, Harris died in 1992.

After Martin died in Clearwater, Florida on August 31, 1960, the daily strip was discontinued after October 15, 1960. The Sunday page ran unsigned until June 6, 1965, when the signature of his assistant, Les Carroll, appeared. Carroll drew the strip until October 6, 1968.

== Books ==
Boots and the Mystery of the Unlucky Vase, a book based on the strip, was published in 1943. Written and illustrated by Martin, the storyline followed Boots's adventures on the homefront during World War II.
