= Pea Soup Andersen's =

Restaurant in Santa Nella, California, United States

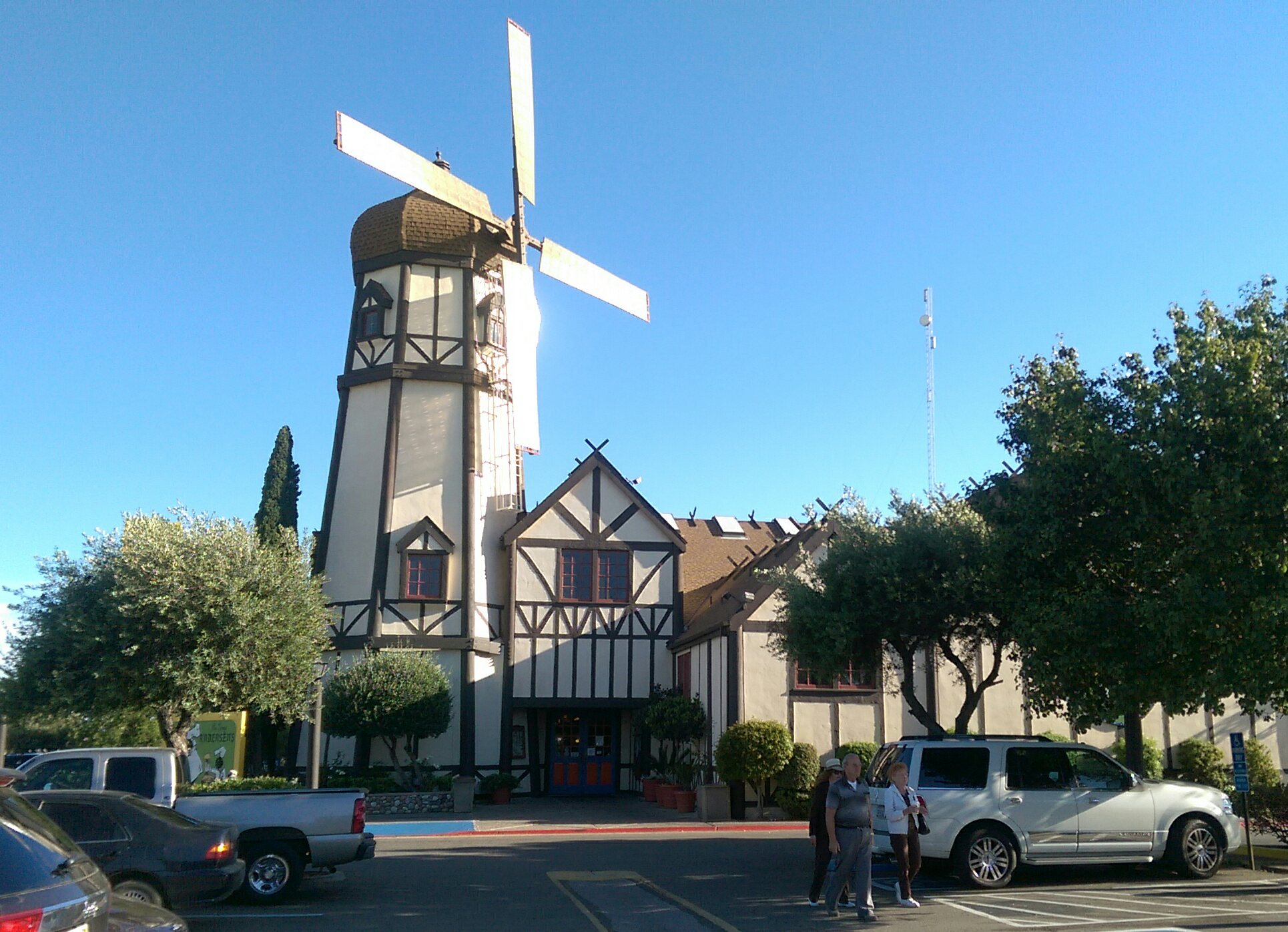
- Exterior of Pea Soup Andersen's in Santa Nella, California
- Interactive map of Pea Soup Andersen's

Restaurant information
- Established: 1924 in Buellton, California
- Location: 12411 South Highway 33, Santa Nella, California, 95322, United States
- Coordinates: 37.1091068°N 121.0169014°W
- Other locations: Buellton, California (1924–2024); Carlsbad, California (c. 1980s); Mammoth Lakes, California (c. 1980s); Selma, California (c. 1980s–2001)
- Website: Official website

Pea Soup Andersen's is a restaurant in Santa Nella, California that primarily serves travelers. It was formerly a chain, with previous locations along other major travel highways in California. The original Pea Soup Andersen's opened in Buellton in 1924. The Santa Nella restaurant then opened in 1976 as its second location. Other locations that operated in the 1980s included Carlsbad, Mammoth Lakes, and Selma. The Buellton location closed in January 2024 for redevelopment, leaving the Santa Nella restaurant as the only Pea Soup Andersen's location currently open. While it is best known for their pea soup, the restaurant serves complete home-style meals. The location also includes a bakery and gift shop and has an associated hotel on the property. The restaurant also markets a line of canned soups.

== History ==
The original Andersen's restaurant was founded in 1924 by Anton Andersen and his wife Juliette. Anton Andersen was born in Denmark and had received training in the restaurant business in Europe and New York City. Juliette was born in France. Anton and Juliette purchased property in the small town of Buellton, California, in Santa Barbara County. Buellton and neighboring Solvang were the focus of a colony of Danish Americans and recent Danish immigrants. They opened a small restaurant and named it "Andersen's Electrical Cafe" in honor of their proudest possession, a new electric stove.

When the restaurant opened they served simple fare such as sandwiches, pancakes, and coffee. From the beginning their customers were primarily travelers driving the main highway between Los Angeles and San Francisco (now U.S. Highway 101) — salesmen, tourists and truck drivers. After three months in business, pea soup was added to the menu, which was made from a recipe handed down through Juliette's family. While the restaurant's reputation became known for their good food, Juliette's pea soup was the signature attraction.

In 1928 the Andersens added a hotel and dining room to the cafe on their property. These changes shifted the focus of Pea Soup Andersen's from being just a restaurant to a roadside attraction. With Buellton located along Highway 101, it made Pea Soup Andersen's a convenient stop for travelers heading between Los Angeles and the San Francisco Bay.

In the 1930s their son Robert graduated from Stanford University and entered the business. He nicknamed himself "Pea Soup Andersen", which became the name of the restaurant and business in 1947. He established the tradition of billboards up and down the state of California. He also acquired the rights to a cartoon called "Little Known Occupations" from Charles Forbell, which showed comical chefs splitting peas with a hammer and chisel, and turned them into the restaurant's mascots, "Hap-pea" and "Pea-wee".

In the early 1950s animator and future Gumby creator Art Clokey produced stop motion commercials for Pea Soup Andersen's.

In 1965, the restaurant was sold to entrepreneur Vince Evans. He developed a miniature train, aviary, and even a small wild animal park on the property, but they were demolished in 1970 to make room for a Danish-themed motel.

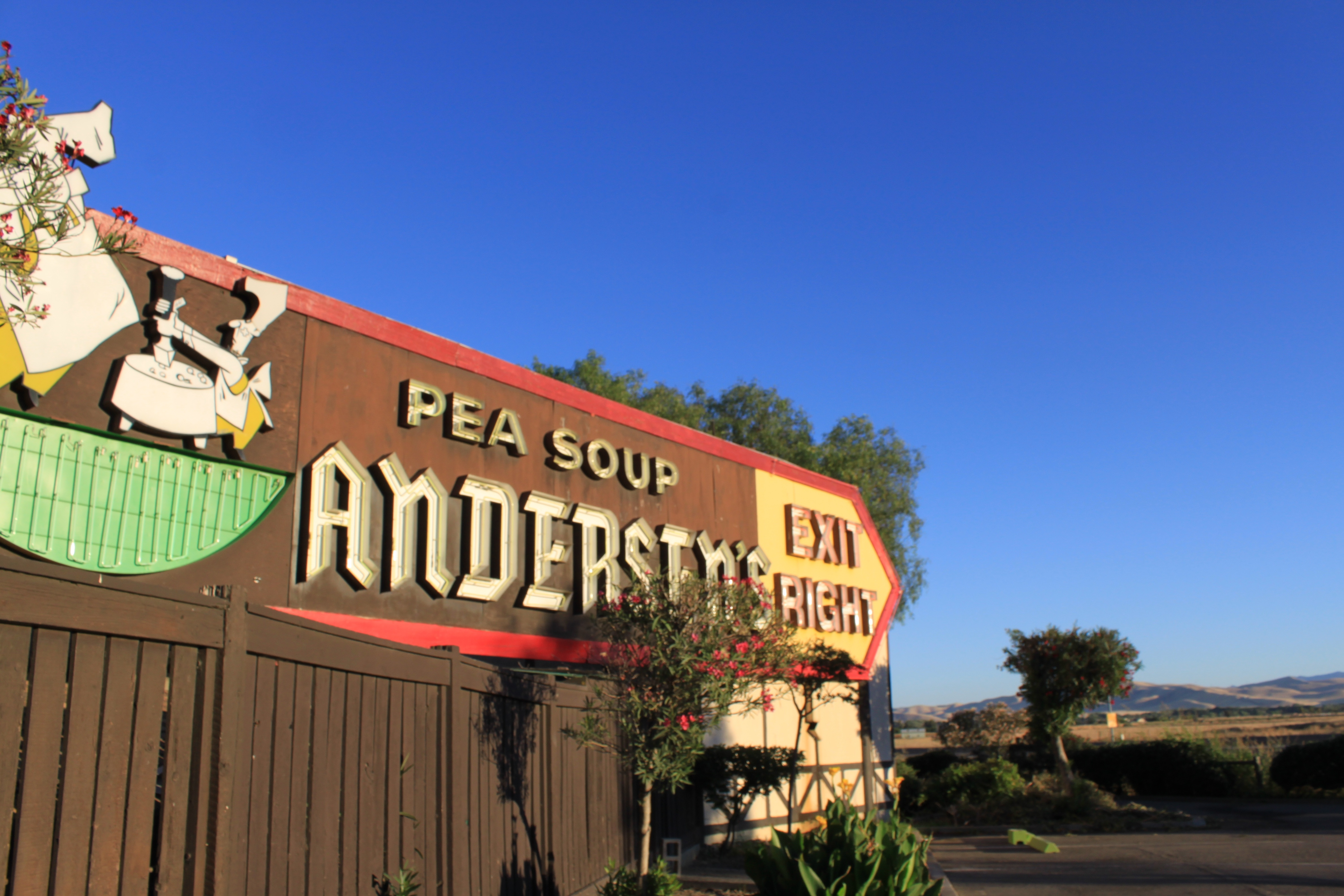
Pea Soup Andersen's sign in Santa Nella, California

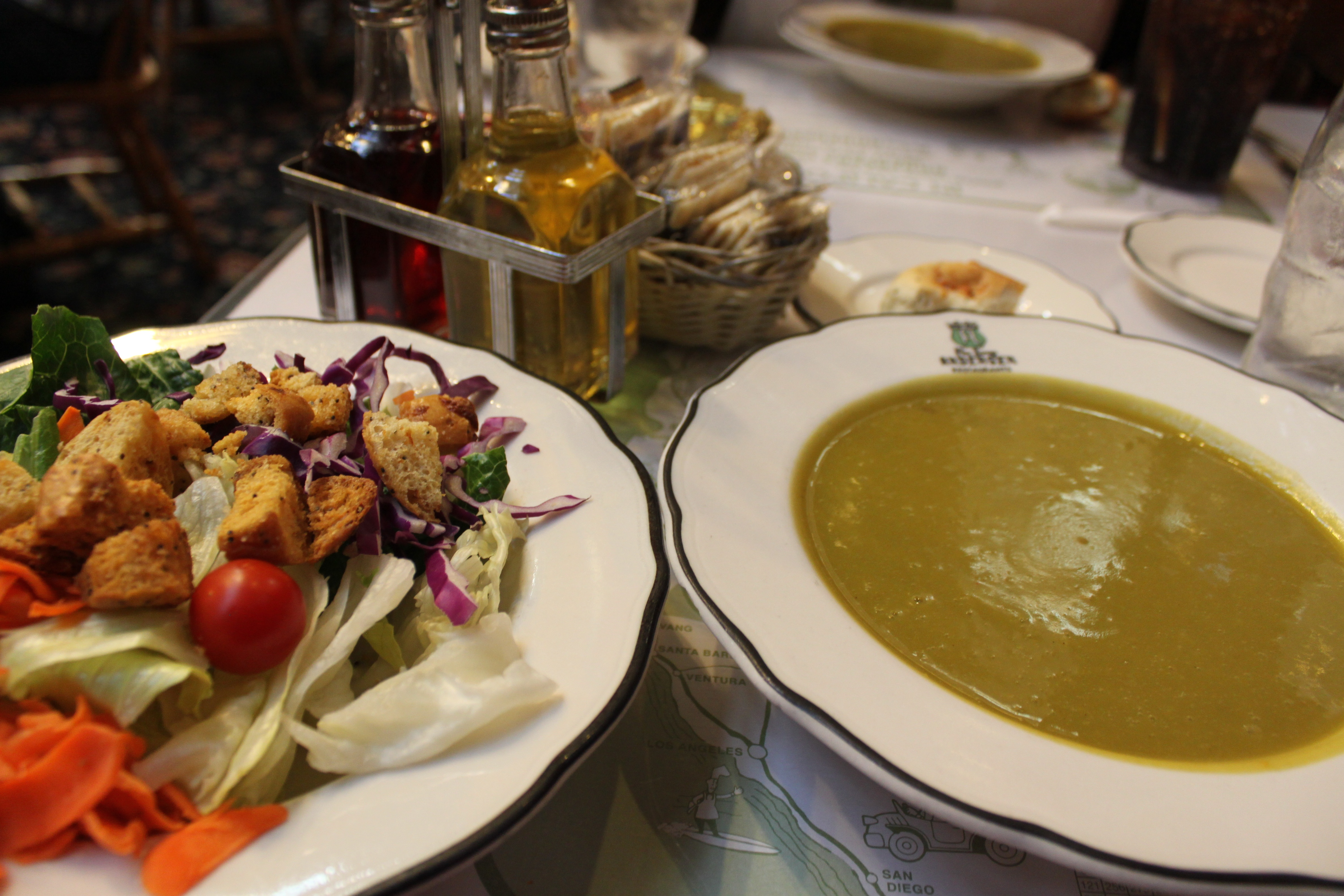
Pea soup and salad at Pea Soup Andersen's

In 1976 the company established a second location in Santa Nella, California, in Merced County near Interstate 5. The property included a restaurant, gift shop, hotel, and gas station, all branded with the Andersen's name. A distinctive feature was a working windmill, attached to the restaurant and visible from the highway, which became a symbol of the company.

During the 1980s two additional short-lived restaurants were opened, in Mammoth Lakes and in Carlsbad near Interstate 5. The Carlsbad location became a TGI Friday's, which closed in 2018; it now operates as the Windmill Food Hall, housing eleven restaurants and a bar, but still features the Andersen windmill, which was repaired in the summer of 2019. There was also a location in Selma, which opened in the 1980s and lasted until 2001. The street it was on, Pea Soup Andersen Boulevard, still bears the name.

After the death of Evans in 1980 the restaurants went through multiple ownerships. The remaining restaurant in Santa Nella is now owned by Milt Guggia, a Central Coast restaurateur.

Throughout all of the years the restaurant has been in business the menu has offered an option of all-you-can-eat pea soup, now called the "Traveller's Special". In 2012 it was noted that the restaurant sold 500 to 600 U.S. gallons (1,900 to 2,300 liters) of pea soup in a day.

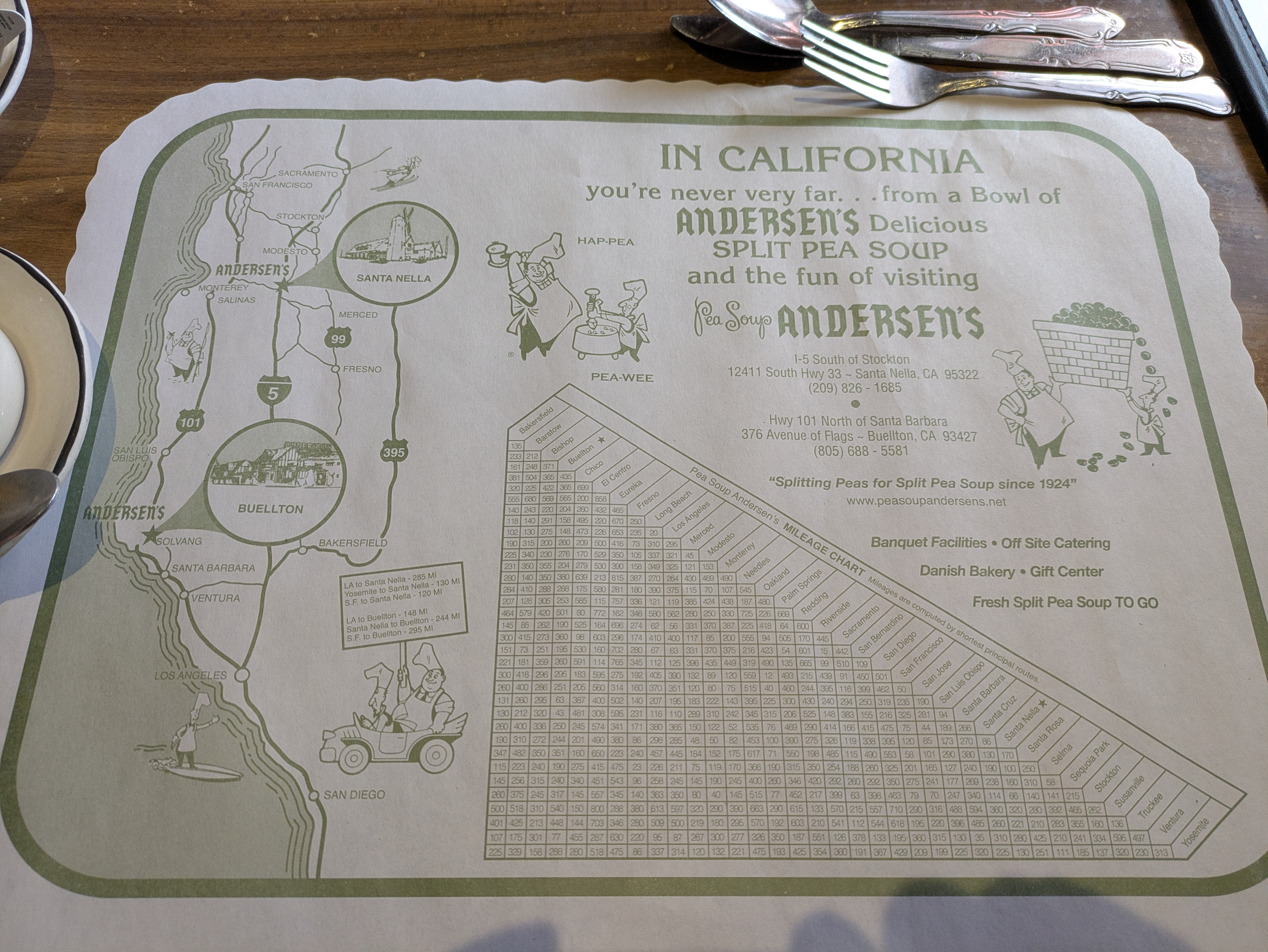
Placemat served in 2026 showing the Santa Nella and former Buellton restaurant locations on a highway map of California, with a travel distance chart of various cities.

In January 2021 the original Buellton location was listed for sale, with an asking price of $4.7 million, but no buyer was publicly announced. In January 2024, it closed for redevelopment just before its 100th anniversary, leaving the Santa Nella restaurant as the only location currently open. The empty Buellton restaurant was vandalized and in July 2026 the Buellton City Council voted to remove its designation as a historic landmark so that it could be demolished.

== Cultural references ==
Pea Soup Andersen's is referenced in the Arrested Development episode "Rom-Traum".

The Buellton location is also featured in The Girls Next Door Season 5 episode "Happy Birthday, Anastasia".
