= Morty Meekle =

Newspaper comic strip, published from 1956 to 1966

- Author: Dick Cavalli
- Current status/schedule: Concluded daily & Sunday strip
- Launch date: January 9, 1956
- End date: February 26, 1966
- Alternate name(s): Morty Meekle and Winthrop
- Syndicate(s): Newspaper Enterprise Association
- Genre(s): comedy, gag-a-day
- Followed by: Winthrop

Morty Meekle is an American syndicated newspaper comic strip that was published between 1956 and 1966, created and produced by cartoonist Dick Cavalli. The series featured the title character dealing with office and dating situations, and, like Fritzi Ritz, which became Nancy after sixteen years, evolved to focus on the younger characters from Cavalli's strip, and was renamed Morty Meekle and Winthrop and then just Winthrop on February 27, 1966.

== Publication history ==
Gag cartoonist Dick Cavalli—whose work appeared in magazines including The Saturday Evening Post and Collier's—had achieved such popularity by 1956 that Writer's Digest observed he had "risen to the top faster than any other cartoonist in the business." On January 9 of that year, Cavalli launched Newspaper Enterprise Association's syndicated comic strip Morty Meekle, featuring the courtship of the title character and his girlfriend, Jill Wortle, as well as Morty's travails at his low-level office job under boss E.G. Boomer. The strip gradually deemphasized the romance and work aspects in favor of what comics historian Maurice Horn called its "background chorus of snide youngsters with a perceptive take on the human condition." On February 27, 1966, Cavalli removed the adult characters and renamed the strip Winthrop, after Jill's kid brother, the most prominent of the young social critics.

== Cast ==
- Morty Meekle – office worker
- Jill Wortle – Morty's girlfriend
- Mr. and Mrs. Wortle – Jill's parents
- Winthrop Wortle – Jill's kid brother
- E. G. Boomer – Morty's boss

== Paperback collections ==
- Cavalli, Dick, "Morty Meekle", Dell collection – 1957
