= OstrichLand USA =

Ranch in Buellton, California

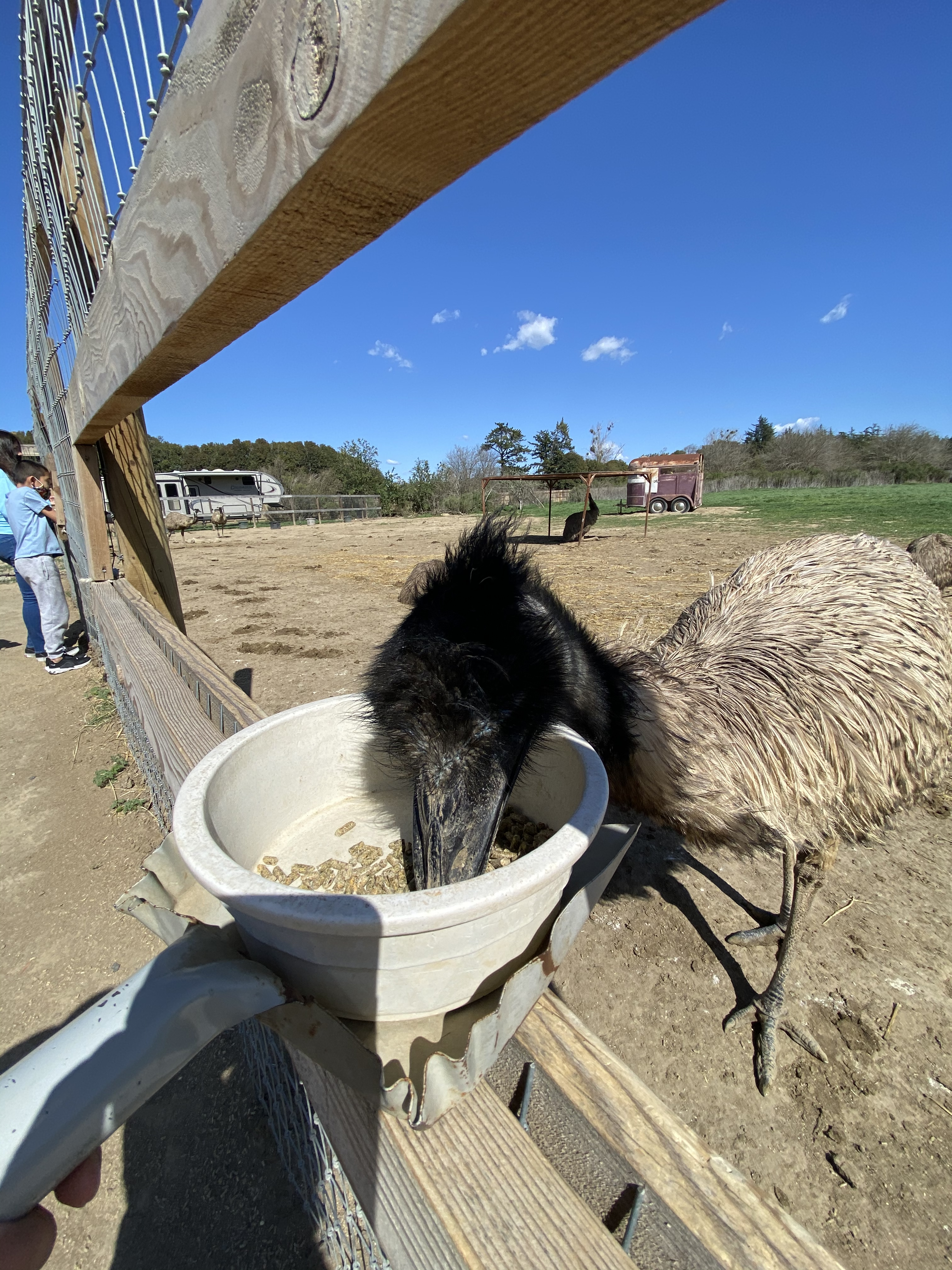
- Feeding an emu at the ranch
- Interactive map of OstrichLand USA
- 34.607168°N 120.176573°W
- Date opened: Early 1990s
- Location: Buellton, California, United States
- Land area: 33 acres
- No. of animals: Over 100
- Owner: Trudy Brown
- Website: www.ostrichlandusa.com

OstrichLand USA is an ostrich and emu ranch in Santa Barbara County, California, in between the towns of Buellton and Solvang, just off California State Route 246. It is known for its over 100 ostriches and emus, which people can visit to feed.

Southern California was chosen for this location specifically because of its resemblance to the surroundings of Africa and Australia. Along with being a popular tourist attraction with people passing through Santa Ynez Valley, the farm also raises ostriches for their eggs only and not their meat.

== History ==
A South African couple founded the site in the early 1990s, after bringing their ostriches from the country in the late 1980s. It was bought in 2000 by Trudy Brown, the current owner. She employs a staff of six people who also help care for the birds. Brown did not originally have a background in farming, instead retail.

The COVID-19 pandemic caused a temporary closure of visitors along with some laying offs of staff. Ostrich eggs were unable to be sold during this time, resulting in a backlog of over 300. To solve this, the ranch created a stand from which eggs were sold, one customer at a time.

During the 2022–2023 California floods, the riverbed nearby the ranch overflowed and destroyed some fences throughout the property, causing the ranch to close for two days in order to fix it. While the fences were destroyed, the ostriches and emus stayed on high ground, nearby bushes and trees. None left the location at all.

== Animals ==
The ostriches and emus on the ranch were trained to eat out of a bowl, and two female ostriches were hand-raised in the store. On busy days, feeding may be restricted due to the fear of the birds overeating.

According to the owner, Trudy Brown, there are approximately 80 ostriches and 20 emus.

Visitors are advised to hold their bowl full of alfafa pellets, which will be used for feeding, tightly, along with not touching the birds and keeping their fingers clear of the bowl.

Dogs are allowed to be on the premises, but they must be leashed.

== Shop ==
The shop at the ranch sells many ostrich related items, such as feather dusters, ostrich eggs, ostrich jerky, ostrich oil, and other memorabilia, like stuffed toys. Any meat sold by the store does not come from the ostriches at OstrichLand, but instead from other farms. Eggs sold are edible, and blown painted eggshells are also sold.

== In popular culture ==
The farm appears in the films Sideways and Paddleton.

An episode of the program Valley's Gold, "Exotic Farm Animals", centers around the ranch.

The site was featured an episode of the television series Small Town Big Deal.

A challenge in the show The Great Food Truck Race occurs in the farm, in which teams are challenged to find and sell ostrich eggs.

Ian Shive of the Discovery Channel visited the park for his show Nature in Focus.

An episode of The Simpsons, "How Munched is That Birdie in the Window?", partially takes place in a fictionalized version of OstrichLand, called Ostrich World. Crew members visited the ranch in order to gain inspiration for the scene.
