= Monty (comic strip) =

American comic strip by Jim Meddick

- Monty
- Author: Jim Meddick
- Website: www.gocomics.com/monty
- Current status/schedule: Running
- Launch date: 18 February 1985; 41 years ago, as Robotman
- Alternate name(s): Robotman; Robotman and Monty
- Syndicate(s): United Feature Syndicate; Newspaper Enterprise Association
- Publisher(s): Topper Books; Andrews McMeel Publishing; Plan 9 Publishing
- Genre: Humor

Monty is an American comic strip created, written and illustrated by cartoonist Jim Meddick. The strip began as Robotman starting February 18, 1985. The title changed to Monty in 2001.

== Robotman ==
Robotman as seen in Robotman & Friends.

Robotman as seen in the Robotman comic circa 1997.

The comic strip began as Robotman on February 18, 1985. It originally depicted the exploits of a small robot from outer space visiting Earth, living with the ordinary Milde family.

Robotman originated as a character created by British musician Peter Shelley. Shelley later worked with United Feature Syndicate in an attempt to push Robotman via cross-marketing toys, records, videos, and other merchandise. In 1985, DIC Enterprises produced a 90-minute television special called Robotman & Friends.

The syndicate desired to have a comic strip featuring the character; they had asked Bill Watterson to incorporate the character into Calvin and Hobbes as a condition of syndication, but Watterson refused. The job was then passed on to Jim Meddick, who created the family setting and the other characters. As the strip progressed the design of Robotman changed considerably as Meddick's style evolved. Within about 18 months after the strip debuted, the merchandising of the Robotman character had declined, and eventually the comic strip was left as the only active license for the character.

In the 1990s, Meddick changed the strip so that instead of the Mildes, Robotman began living with a geeky inventor named Monty, introduced in the January 20, 1993 strip.

During contract negotiations, the syndicate approached Meddick with a request to change the name of the strip to Monty and to deemphasize and remove the Robotman character from the strip. This was due to an ongoing difficulty in marketing the strip with the name Robotman. (For a brief period, the strip was rechristened Robotman and Monty.)

Robotman was gradually phased out of the strip through a farewell storyline in 2001 in which he left Earth to find love on the planet Diskelion. The series continued as Monty in April 2001, with Robotman's place in the strip being taken by space alien Mr. Pi.

== Storylines ==
As the website announces, the comic strip "spoofs suburbia, trashes tacky TV shows and offers absurdist commentary on everything from hosing down spider monkeys to the latest conspiracy theory." Monty Montahue, the brainy, bumbling bachelor who's unlucky in work and love, is the star of the strip.

Explains Meddick, "I've tried to create the comic strip equivalent of Monty Python's Flying Circus. The name 'Monty' is a nod to the influence that show had on my humor. In my cartoon just about anything can happen — this way, the ideas and characters always stay fresh."

== Characters ==
=== Current cast ===
- Monty Montahue is the protagonist and titular character. He is an odd, optimistic nerd who often comes up with strange inventions and works odd jobs. Monty was introduced to the Robotman strip in the early 1990s. In 1996, it was revealed that Monty was brainwashed of his past life as a government scientist when he invented Robotman. Monty is typically depicted as socially awkward, having poor dress skills and has a prominent nose but no chin. He takes on various (often very nerdy) hobbies and daily occupations, regularly failing because of a mix of goofiness and excessive self-confidence.

First Appearance: Early 1990s

- Fleshy is a skinny, hairless housecat resembling the Pink Panther cartoon character. Fleshy is remarkable for his being the complete opposite of feline attitudes: he is goofy, fearful, unable to catch even the most innocuous of butterflies. Fleshy is frequently shown to be entirely uninterested while in the presence of people, but once alone, he shows his intelligence to be on par with humans. He has a son, who was abducted (and then returned) by the same aliens that took Robotman.

First Appearance: April 2, 2001

- Moondog McHorney is the only true friend of Monty. He's a chronic beer drinker, and his house is one of the biggest centers of entropy in the world.

First Appearance: April 14, 2001

- Pilsner is Moondog's cynical parrot, who often seems to be smarter than his owner, but still hasn't managed to understand that the other parrot he sees in the mirror is himself.

First Appearance: April 23, 2001

- Dehlia is Monty's casual girlfriend. She works part-time with him in a Halloween pop-up store.

First Appearance:September 19, 2015

- Professor Xemit is a time traveler from the year 2525 who came to visit the early 21st century and wound up living with Monty for a while and still visits occasionally.

First Appearance: April 9, 2007

- EB3 is a cyborg and a friend of Professor Xemit's. Small in stature and painted white, he frets incessantly about the fact that he has a "P-word" (in his case meaning pancreas, not what you might think it means). Monty often tries to reassure about his pancreas anxiety ("I have one. Doc has one. It's nothing to be ashamed of!"). He has shown romantic interest in a vacuum cleaner.

First Appearance: October 14, 2008

- Sedgwick Nuttingham III is a privileged child who inhabits a mansion somewhere in Monty's neighborhood. His only companion is his faithful manservant Jarvis, who does anything that Sedgwick desires, from carrying ammunition as Sedgwick hunts Fleshy, to serving as a human target for snowballs, darts etc. Sedgwick's parents do not appear in the strip. The characters have occasional contact with Sedgewick's father, but he is usually away on business and rarely home. Sedgewick's Aunt Polly lives in the mansion and exercises some parental control, but is not seen in the strip. Auntie Nell appears sometimes. The only other characters that Sedgwick interacts with besides Fleshy are various doctors and psychologists. Sedgwick is highly conservative politically, elitist, and convinced of his innate superiority to all others. First Appearance: May 11, 2009
- Jarvis is Sedgwick's aristocratic butler, with a politely sarcastic sense of humor. First Appearance: May 11, 2009

=== Previous characters ===
- Robotman the original character for which the comic was originally named. He was portrayed at first as visiting Earth, but was later revealed to have been built by Monty in a secret government project. He originally lived with the Milde Family.
- The Milde Family was the original supporting cast for Robotman during the 1980s. They portrayed an American middle-class family that lived in suburbia. It was made up of Robotman's best friend Oscar who was an insecure boy about 10 years old, his cynical teenage brother Gary, and their parents. When the strip shifted focus away from Robotman, they stopped appearing.
- Bruce; Robotman's evil twin. He too was phased out after Monty's debut.
- Olga; was one of Monty's girlfriends in the mid-90s. She was a personal trainer, large-boned and muscular, in contrast to the out-of-shape Monty.
- Loco Ohno was Monty's on-again/off-again girlfriend, a parody of Yoko Ono. She was cynical and artistic, very different from the optimistic and technology-minded Monty. She was a devoted feminist, often finding men being the root of evil.

First Appearance: April 16, 2001 Last Appearance:April 27, 2004

- Gretchen is a coffee waitress on whom Monty has a crush. She, however, does not return the feelings. She's a friend and is currently single.

First Appearance:

- Lorri (also spelled Laurie) was Monty's aggressive girlfriend. She works at a garage.

First Appearance: September 29, 2004

- Chimpy was a talking chimpanzee. Chimpy constantly attempted to demonstrate his superiority to (or at least parity with) human intelligence and culture, but in fact, he was not particularly bright. For example, he attempted to use a circular saw as a hammer. He left the strip for no apparent reason two years after his debut.

First Appearance:July 3, 2001 Last Appearance: December 20, 2003

- Dave-7, formerly known as Mr. Pi, was an alien from Rigel and served as Monty's straight man. Dave-7 lived with Monty. He was very logical and deeply involved in studying sciences such as quantum mechanics. There were occasionally ominous references to his race's plans to take over the earth. Nothing has come of them yet. The closest they ever got was to the moon. Then Chimpy got his hands on Dave-7's fleet-command-device, thinking it was a video game, and annihilated the entire fleet.

First Appearance: April 2, 2001 Last Appearance:

- Giggles the Gumdrop-Eating Bear was introduced when Robotman met him in a "coping with cuteness" support group. His relentlessly cheerful personality is embraced by readers and syndicate executives who love him and his tie-in merchandise, but the other characters find him creepy and off-putting.

== Books ==
Several strip collections have been published:

- Robotman Takes Off: 1986 by Topper Books.
- Robotman: The Untold Story 1988 by Topper Books.
- Cyberpunktrek: With Robotman and his Evil Twin Bruce 1990 by Topper Books.
- Primary Crullers: A Robotman Book 1997 by Andrews McMeel Publishing.
- The Prehistoric Robotman 2003 by Plan 9 Publishing.

== Plot milestones ==
- Patrick Stewart, the actor who portrayed Jean-Luc Picard in Star Trek, once tried to kidnap Fleshy. It appears Stewart was his former owner. Eventually Monty manages to take Fleshy back, thanks to his abilities in race walking.
- While attempting to emulate Spider-Man, Monty was bitten by a radioactive ladybug and became Ladybugman, whose superpowers include ladybug senses (the ability to sense when and where rainbows will form, which caterpillars are aggressive, when a leprechaun is lying, and when somebody is crabby and needs a nap), a hard shell, the ability to sew, the ability to instill guilt in others, the ability to flutter through the air, and the ability to emit a malodorous fluid ("Actually... he's always had that ability" - Dave-7).

== Notable spoofs ==
- There was a three-week spoof of The Lord of the Rings: Monty's "The Lord of the Thing".
- In March 2006, there was a two-week spoof of the television series Lost, where Monty found himself shipwrecked on the island. In this spoof, Monty discovers that the Others are actually the castaways from Gilligan's Island.
- Following a transporter accident, Robotman and Mr. Spock exchanged ears. This had to be rectified by the Vulcan Ear meld.
- After assuring Monty that he would be unaffected by the Y2k bug, Robotman became a Theodore Roosevelt-like character.

== See also ==
- Conker the Squirrel, another character introduced as a children's character but eventually reworked into a satirical adult character, like Robotman.
