= Dick Cavalli =

American cartoonist (1923–1997)

- Born: Richard A. Cavalli; September 23, 1923 New York City, US
- Died: October 16, 1997 (aged 74) New Canaan, Connecticut, US
- Areas: Penciller, Inker
- Notable works: Morty Meekle, Winthrop

Richard A. Cavalli (September 28, 1923 – October 16, 1997) was an American commercial illustrator and cartoonist best known for the comic strips Morty Meekle and its successor, Winthrop, which consecutively were syndicated to newspapers from 1956 to 1994.

== Biography ==
Cavalli was born and educated in New York City. He did military service in World War II, seeing combat with the Air Force Ground Groups and the infantry in France, Luxembourg and Germany. On his return to the U.S., he did pen and ink drawing of fossilized specimens for the American Museum of Natural History in Manhattan, and studied cartooning at the Cartoonists & Illustrators School, where he was in the first graduating class.

Winthrop strip of October 2, 1972, depicting the title character and his father. The strip often derived humor from the juxtaposition of adult notions and concerns emanating from the mouths of children.

His gag cartoons in magazines including The Saturday Evening Post and Collier's, Ms., Working Woman, and The Atlantic Monthly. had achieved such popularity by 1956 that Writer's Digest observed he had "risen to the top faster than any other cartoonist in the business." That year he became one of the founding 10 cartoonists, alongside Al Capp, Milton Caniff, and others, to be affiliated with the Famous Artists Cartoon Course correspondence course, a spinoff of the Famous Artists School.

On January 9, 1956, Cavalli launched Newspaper Enterprise Association's syndicated comic strip Morty Meekle, featuring the courtship of the title character and his girlfriend, Jill Wortle. The strip gradually began emphasizing what comics historian Maurice Horn called its "background chorus of snide youngsters with a perceptive take on the human condition." On February 27, 1966, Cavalli removed the adult characters and renamed the strip Winthrop, after Jill's kid brother, the most prominent of the young social critics. The strip ended on May 14, 1994.

Additionally, from 1982 to 1983, he was the successor cartoonist on the comic strip Norbert, taking over from creator George Fett.

== Personal life ==
Cavalli and his wife, Helen, had two daughters, Tory and Cassie. He died October 16, 1997 of a heart attack, having suffered at least two previously. He was living in New Canaan, Connecticut, at the time of his death.

== Bibliography ==
- Winthrop: A Strip Coloring Book (Saalfield Publishing Company, Book # 2915 : Akron, Ohio, 1968). Reprints daily strips originally published 1966–1968.
