= Edgar Martin =

American cartoonist

- Born: Edgar Everett Martin; July 6, 1898; Indianapolis, Indiana
- Died: August 31, 1960 (aged 62); Clearwater, Florida
- Other name: Abe Martin
- Education: Monmouth College; Chicago Academy of Fine Arts
- Occupation: Cartoonist
- Known for: Comic Strip Boots and Her Buddies
- Spouse: Mary Armsby
- Children: 3 daughters

Edgar Everett Martin (July 6, 1898 – August 31, 1960), known to his family and friends as Abe Martin, was an American cartoonist, who kept his comic strip, Boots and Her Buddies, running for decades, eventually reaching an audience of 60 million readers.

== Biography ==
Born in Indianapolis, Indiana, the youth moved with his family to Nashville, Tennessee and then to Monmouth, Illinois where his father, George Martin, was a Monmouth College biology professor. As a Monmouth College freshman, he drew frogs, grasshoppers and salamanders in his father's biology classes.

He met and married Mary Armsby while attending Monmouth College. (Two of their three daughters also went to Monmouth.) Martin left his junior year to study at the Chicago Academy of Fine Arts, joining Newspaper Enterprise Association in 1921 as a cartoonist.

=== Boots and Her Buddies ===
While working in NEA's art department, Martin experimented with several strips: Efficiency Ed, Fables of 1921, Taken from Life and Girls, the strip which introduced Boots. In 1924, NEA was looking for a girl strip, and several artists who had previously submitted strips were asked to resubmit them. Martin's sample was unsigned. When an editor examined Martin's strip and asked, "How soon can we get this artist?", the art director responded, "In one minute. He works here." Thus, Girls became Boots and Her Buddies on February 18, 1924, although some newspapers continued to use the first title. Syndicated by NEA, it appeared in 500 newspapers during the 1940s, with about half that carrying the Sunday strip. In the post-WWII years, the figure climbed to 700 newspapers.

With the strip's emphasis on fashion and beauty, Martin attended style shows and constantly thumbed through fashion magazines to study trends and keep Boots in current fashions. In addition to the strip, Martin drew promotional paper dolls in occasional newspaper cartoon panels displaying Boots and her fashionable outfits. Promoted as an expert of female beauty, Martin was often invited to judge beauty contests. In the early days, the strip had a large following among students at colleges and high schools, with the result that Martin sometimes made personal appearances at proms.

Interviewed in 1952, Martin revealed the strip's background and his attitude toward the characters:

Five weeks before Boots' friends read of her activities in their local paper, Mr. Martin has drawn her actions for that day and mailed them to NEA (Newspaper Enterprise Association) for distribution to 700 papers which carry the feature daily. This is almost an anniversary for the cartoon which was first read on July 1, 1921. At that time Boots was in college and was a pacesetter for fashions of the day... Her creator said that either he or Boots must have been pretty dumb because it took her a number of years to graduate. Partly, he said, this was because he hated to marry her to anyone, and partly because during the 1920s she was a symbol of taste in clothes and fashion, and having her married might cramp her style as "Everybody's Sweetheart." Friends know, however, that she is now married and has a small son. The son, Mr. Martin says, is his only pal, as he himself has three daughters, all of them married, and a granddaughter. Actually, he says, the characters in a comic strip become a part of their creator's own family. Each has individuality and is bounded by propriety in things that can and cannot be done, the same as any individual. Of one thing the cartoonist is sure, and that is that a comic strip misses its point unless it deals with human things in a human manner. The best feeling of all, he thinks, is to read a strip and say, "Why that same thing happened to me last week!" What but a domestic situation with everyday people could last for more than 30 years and still have a circulation numbered in the millions?" Some fans are really avid. Recently Mr. Martin received word of one reader who has at least 30 scrapbooks filled with the activities of Boots, from 1921-1951, inclusive.

— Charles E. Hallam, Rock Island Argus, July 4, 1952

Martin's assistant Les Carroll eventually took over the Sunday strip, but Martin continued to draw the daily strip. The character of Billy, Boots' brother, was based on Martin himself.

=== Later life and death ===
Martin, who enjoyed antique collecting and golf, lived at 305 North Second Street in Monmouth. He and his family moved to Clearwater, Florida in 1940. When he died in Clearwater on August 30, 1960, he was survived by his widow, three daughters and five grandchildren.
