= Frank and Ernest (comic strip) =

American comic strip

- Author: Bob Thaves; Tom Thaves
- Website: www.gocomics.com/frank-and-ernest
- Current status/schedule: Current daily strip
- Launch date: November 6, 1972; 53 years ago
- Syndicate(s): Newspaper Enterprise Association
- Genre(s): Humor, Satire

Frank and Ernest is an American comic strip created and illustrated by Bob Thaves and later Tom Thaves. It debuted on November 6, 1972, and has since been published daily in over 1,200 newspapers.

The strip is distributed to Spanish-speaking countries as Justo y Franco.

Bob Thaves died on August 1, 2006. His son, Tom Thaves, has since taken over production of the strip.

== Awards ==
Thaves won the National Cartoonists Society's Newspaper Panel Cartoon Award for 1983, 1984, and 1986 for his work on the strip. Other awards include the Mencken Award for Free Speech and designation as a Champion of Creativity by the American Creativity Association in 2006.
