= Buellton, California =

City in California, United States

- City
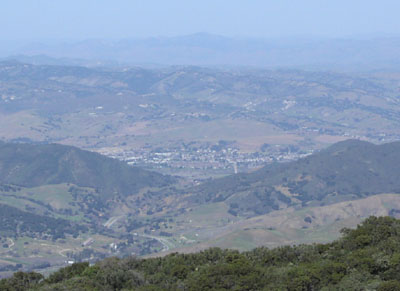
- Buellton, as seen from near Gaviota Peak in the Santa Ynez Mountains

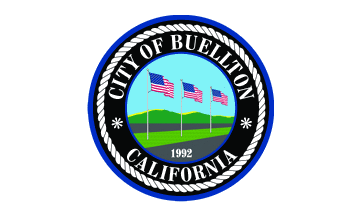
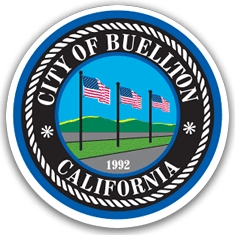
- Flag Seal
- Interactive map of Buellton, California
- Location within California Location within the United States
- Coordinates: 34°36′51″N 120°11′38″W
- Country: United States
- State: California
- County: Santa Barbara
- Incorporated: February 1, 1992

Government
  - Mayor: David Silva
  - State senator: Monique Limón (D)
  - Assemblymember: Gregg Hart (D)
  - U. S. rep.: Salud Carbajal (D)

Area
  - Total: 1.58 sq mi (4.10 km^{2})
  - Land: 1.58 sq mi (4.10 km^{2})
  - Water: 0 sq mi (0.00 km^{2})
- Elevation: 358 ft (109 m)

Population (2020)
  - Total: 5,161
  - Density: 3,260.2/sq mi (1,258.78/km^{2})
- Time zone: UTC-08:00 (PST)
  - Summer (DST): UTC-07:00 (PDT)
- ZIP code: 93427
- Area code: 805
- FIPS code: 06-08758
- GNIS feature ID: 1667902
- Website: www.cityofbuellton.com

Buellton is a small city in Santa Barbara County, California, United States. It is located in the Santa Ynez Valley, 3 miles (4.8 km) west of Solvang. The population was 5,161 at the 2020 census, up from 4,828 at the 2010 census.

Located at the junction of U.S. Route 101 and State Route 246, Buellton attracts travelers to hotels, restaurants, parks and shops. It may be most famous for its nickname “Home of Split Pea Soup,” which is a reference to the former Pea Soup Andersen's Restaurant that shut down in 2024. Buellton traces its beginnings to 1867 when a portion of a Mexican land grant was deeded to Rufus T. Buell and his brother. They developed a successful cattle ranch in the 19th century.

== History ==
Dining Cars Cafe, Buellton, California, photographed by John Margolies in 1976

Buellton is named for Rufus T. Buell, an early settler who owned the Rancho San Carlos de Jonata Mexican land grant. It has been a minor tourist destination since the 1920s, and became increasingly popular after the opening of Pea Soup Andersen's in 1924. This and an abundance of fuel, lodging and other traveler services led Buellton to adopt the nickname "Servicetown, USA."

Buellton has also experienced increased notoriety due to the film Sideways (2004), which was filmed in Buellton and Solvang. The city has gained additional tourism due to many nearby wineries, two popular breweries, and the Flying Flags RV Resort.

== Geography ==
The town is surrounded by miles of open-space land in the Santa Ynez Valley, and borders the Santa Ynez River to the south. It is home to a library, one park, a golf course, fire station, Highway Patrol Office, a shopping plaza, 10 hotels and 18 restaurants.

According to the United States Census Bureau, the city has a total area of 1.6 square miles (4.1 km^{2}), of which 99.96% is land and 0.04% is water.

It is a common stop for travelers on U.S. Highway 101, being the first town north of Santa Barbara after the scenic and undeveloped stretch of approximately 25 miles (40 km) through the Gaviota Coast.

== Demographics ==
Historical population
Census	Pop.	Note	%±
1970	1,402		—
1980	2,364		68.6%
1990	3,506		48.3%
2000	3,828		9.2%
2010	4,828		26.1%
2020	5,161		6.9%
U.S. Decennial Census; 1860–1870 1880-1890; 1900 1910 1920; 1930 1940 1950; 1960 1970 1980; 1990 2000 2010; 2020

=== 2020 census ===
As of the 2020 census, Buellton had a population of 5,161. The population density was 3,262.3 inhabitants per square mile (1,259.6/km^{2}). The age distribution was 23.8% under the age of 18, 6.2% aged 18 to 24, 24.4% aged 25 to 44, 27.9% aged 45 to 64, and 17.7% who were 65 years of age or older. The median age was 40.9 years. For every 100 females there were 97.9 males, and for every 100 females age 18 and over there were 94.9 males age 18 and over.

Racial composition as of the 2020 census
Race	Number	Percent
White	3,325	64.4%
Black or African American	34	0.7%
American Indian and Alaska Native	81	1.6%
Asian	121	2.3%
Native Hawaiian and Other Pacific Islander	6	0.1%
Some other race	701	13.6%
Two or more races	893	17.3%
Hispanic or Latino (of any race)	1,676	32.5%

The whole population lived in households. There were 1,943 households in Buellton, of which 35.6% had children under the age of 18 living in them. Of all households, 54.4% were married-couple households, 6.9% were cohabiting couple households, 16.6% were households with a male householder and no spouse or partner present, and 22.1% were households with a female householder and no spouse or partner present. About 23.1% of all households were made up of individuals and 11.5% had someone living alone who was 65 years of age or older. The average household size was 2.66. There were 1,356 families (69.8% of all households).

There were 2,030 housing units at an average density of 1,283.2 units per square mile (495.4 units/km^{2}), of which 1,943 (95.7%) were occupied. Of these, 68.5% were owner-occupied, and 31.5% were occupied by renters. 4.3% of housing units were vacant. The homeowner vacancy rate was 1.3% and the rental vacancy rate was 3.6%.

100.0% of residents lived in urban areas, while 0.0% lived in rural areas.

=== Income and poverty ===
In 2023, the US Census Bureau estimated that the median household income was $96,028, and the per capita income was $46,257. About 2.0% of families and 2.9% of the population were below the poverty line.

=== 2010 ===
At the 2010 census Buellton had a population of 4,828. The population density was 3,050.3 inhabitants per square mile (1,177.7/km^{2}). The racial makeup of Buellton was 3,912 (81.0%) White, 37 (0.8%) African American, 76 (1.6%) Native American, 137 (2.8%) Asian, 5 (0.1%) Pacific Islander, 424 (8.8%) from other races, and 237 (4.9%) from two or more races. Hispanic or Latino of any race were 1,451 persons (30.1%).

The whole population lived in households, no one lived in non-institutionalized group quarters and no one was institutionalized.

There were 1,761 households, 667 (37.9%) had children under the age of 18 living in them, 1,008 (57.2%) were opposite-sex married couples living together, 168 (9.5%) had a female householder with no husband present, 81 (4.6%) had a male householder with no wife present. There were 93 (5.3%) unmarried opposite-sex partnerships, and 10 (0.6%) same-sex married couples or partnerships. 385 households (21.9%) were one person and 189 (10.7%) had someone living alone who was 65 or older. The average household size was 2.74. There were 1,257 families (71.4% of households); the average family size was 3.23.

The population was spread out, with 1,228 people (25.4%) under the age of 18, 391 people (8.1%) aged 18 to 24, 1,229 people (25.5%) aged 25 to 44, 1,343 people (27.8%) aged 45 to 64, and 637 people (13.2%) who were 65 or older. The median age was 39.1 years. For every 100 females, there were 95.5 males. For every 100 females age 18 and over, there were 94.2 males.

There were 1,845 housing units at an average density of 1,165.7 per square mile, of the occupied units 1,226 (69.6%) were owner-occupied and 535 (30.4%) were rented. The homeowner vacancy rate was 2.5%; the rental vacancy rate was 4.4%. 3,262 people (67.6% of the population) lived in owner-occupied housing units and 1,566 people (32.4%) lived in rental housing units.

== Education ==
Buellton has two schools which form the Buellton Union School District. Oak Valley Elementary School serves those students in kindergarten through 5th grade while Jonata Middle School serves grades 6 through 8. The district serves approximately 600 students. In 2019, Jonata Middle School was named a California Distinguished School while the Buellton Union Elementary School District was named a California Exemplary District.

The city is also served by the Santa Ynez Valley Union High School District. Santa Ynez Valley High School is located in Santa Ynez.

== Public safety ==
The Santa Barbara County Sheriff's Office provides contract police services for Buellton, while the Santa Barbara County Fire Department acts as the local fire service through the Santa Barbara County Fire Protection District. California Highway Patrol operates an office in town. The crime rate is low.

== Politics and government ==
As of December 2024, the current mayor of Buellton is David Silva, who is serving his first term as elected Mayor. Other members of the City Council include Vice Mayor Carla Mead, Councilmember Elysia Lewis, Councilmember Hudson Hornick, and Councilmember John Sanchez. The mayor is elected to a two-year term, while the City Councilmembers are elected by District elections to 4 year terms. The Vice Mayor is selected from among the City Councilmembers each year.

The City recently changed the electoral system for Councilmembers elected beginning in November 2022. From this point forward, Councilmembers will be elected by and from one of four districts, each with approximately 1,290 residents.

== Transportation ==
Amtrak Thruway buses offer daily service to/from 237 East Highway 246 to Santa Barbara station, where they connect to Amtrak and FlixBus.

== Activities ==
=== OstrichLand USA ===
OstrichLand USA is a 33-acre (13 ha) ostrich and emu farm located in the Buellton area. Visitors can view and feed the animals.

=== The Hitching Post II ===
In 2004, the U.S. film Sideways prominently featured the Buellton restaurant, launching it as a renowned eatery for visitors touring the local wine region. "Sideways Fest" is an annual three-day event hosted by the Sta. Rita Hills Wine Alliance celebrating the anniversary of the movie's filming in the Santa Ynez Valley.
