= Murray Olderman =

American cartoonist (1922–2020)

- Born: March 27, 1922 Manhattan, New York City, US
- Died: June 10, 2020 (aged 98) Rancho Mirage, California, US
- Areas: Cartoonist, author
- Awards: National Cartoonist Society Sports Cartoon Award, 1974 and 1978

Murray Olderman (March 27, 1922 – June 10, 2020) was an American sports cartoonist and writer. His artwork often accompanied the sports stories he authored. His art also has been used by the Pro Football Hall of Fame and hung above the Hall of Fame busts. The Hall of Fame made all of the artwork digital so it must be accessed by visitors to the hall through electronic kiosks.

== Early life and education ==
Olderman was born in Manhattan, New York, the son of Jennie (Steinberg), a homemaker, and Max Olderman, who worked in the garment industry. His parents were Russian Jewish immigrants. He aspired to be a sportswriter at an early age. When he was in his teens, he wrote sports columns for a county weekly. He practiced drawing cartoons through trial and error. One of his drawings was first published in The Columbia Missourian during his junior year at the University of Missouri. Olderman graduated from University of Missouri with a B.J. degree, Stanford University with a B.S. in humanities, and Northwestern University's Medill School of Journalism with a master's degree in journalism.

== Career ==
Olderman was hired by the McClatchy Newspapers of Sacramento as a sports cartoonist.

Olderman's work appeared in 750 daily newspapers for the greater part of 35 years. His columns and cartoons were distributed by the Newspaper Enterprise Association (NEA), a Scripps-Howard syndicate. Olderman's employment with the NEA began in 1952; he became its sports editor in 1964; executive editor in 1968; and a contributing editor in 1971. Although he "retired" in 1987, he was active until the news service was overtaken by a larger corporation.

Olderman is the founder of the Jim Thorpe Trophy, for the National Football League’s Most Valuable Player, and distributed by the Newspaper Enterprise Association. He also founded the NEA's All-Pro team in 1955, which ran through 1992. It was considered the "player's All-Pro team", since Olderman would poll NFL players to compile the team, as opposed to other publications which was based on writers' opinions.

== Awards ==
Olderman received the National Cartoonist Society Sports Cartoon Award for 1974 and 1978. He received the Pro Football Writers Association Dick McCann Memorial Award in 1979, which is considered to be the writer's wing of the Pro Football Hall of Fame. Olderman was inducted into the National Sportscasters and Sportswriters Association Hall of Fame in 1993. In 1997 he was inducted to the International Jewish Sports Hall of Fame. He was inducted into the Northwestern University Medill Hall of Achievement for 2014.

Olderman was a longtime resident of Rancho Mirage, California, and died there on June 10, 2020.

== Books ==
- Prentice-Hall series:
  - The Pro Quarterbacks (1967)
  - The Running Backs (1969)
  - The Defenders (1980)
- Starr: My Life in Football, with Bart Starr (William Morrow & Co, 1987)
- Mingling With Lions: The Greats of Sports Up Close (Seven Locks Press, 2004) — Olderman's career as a sportswriter and the people he has met along the way. Filled with sketches.
- Angels in the Forest (iUniverse, Inc., 2006)— memoir written with Earl Greif about the latter's survival from a ghetto massacre during World War II and how he escaped the Holocaust
- Just Win, Baby—the Al Davis Story (Triumph Books, 2012) — a biography of the late owner of the Oakland Raiders
- A Year Apart... Letters from War-Torn Europe (Saint Johann Press, 2013) — based on letters written from Europe at the end of World War II by the author to this wife, with added commentary.
- The Draw of Sport (Fantagraphics, 2017) — Cartoons and sketches of more than 150 prominent sports figures by Olderman, each accompanied by an essay by Olderman, sharing his memories of them.
