= Jim Meddick =

American cartoonist

Jim Meddick (born August 1961) is an American cartoonist.

While attending Washington University in St. Louis, he won the Chicago Tribune Student Cartoonist Contest for a strip named Paperback Writer. After graduating, in 1983 he became a political cartoonist. In 1985, he created the comic strip Robotman, now known as Monty. Meddick did not own the Robotman property, whereas he created and owns the Monty character. He lives in Massachusetts with his wife and son.
