= Amok (comics) =

Italian comic book series

Publication information
- Publication date: 1946-1948

Creative team
- Written by: Cesare Solini
- Artist(s): Antonio Canale

Amok (subtitled "II Gigante Mascherato", "the Masked Giant") is an Italian comic book series created by Cesare Solini and Antonio Canale.

== Background ==
The comics started its publications in October 1946, published by Agostino della Casa; the authors, writer Cesare Solini and artist Antonio Canale, signed the comics with the pen names Phil Anderson and Tony Chan. Inspired by the Phantom, it features an Indonesian giant man, born on the Java island, that becomes a masked crimefighter after the kidnapping of his girlfriend.

Despite the success obtained, Amok ended its publications in 1948; over the years it was reprinted several times. The series was also published in several foreign countries.

In Sweden, the comic was renamed Kilroy when it was first published in 1948. The name was inspired by the popular graffiti phrase Kilroy was here. It was such a success in Sweden that new stories were produced directly for the Swedish market (by artists Rolf Gohs and Francisco Cueto) and it was published until the 1970s.
