= Antonio Canale =

Italian comic writer and artist

- Born: 25 February 1915; Monza, Italy
- Died: 15 October 1991 (aged 76); Chiavari, Italy
- Other names: Tony Chan
- Occupation: Cartoonist

Antonio Canale (25 February 1915 – 15 October 1991) was an Italian comic writer and artist, also known under the pen name Tony Chan.

== Life and career ==
Born in Monza, Canale started his career at a very young age as assistant to Toni Pagot. He made his official debut in 1937, collaborating with Gian Luigi Bonelli on the series La piuma verde, published in Il Vittorioso. In 1945 he drew the Bonelli's series Yorga, and in 1946 he co-created with Cesare Solini his best-known work, the superhero comics series Amok.

In the following years Canale collaborated with Fleetway Publications, drew stories of Gim Toro and Kolosso, and created several series including the western-themed Kirby Flint and Hiawatha for Il Corriere dei Piccoli. In 1977 he illustrated the graphic novel Terra maledetta (script by Giancarlo Berardi). In the 1980s he collaborated with the comic magazines Il Giornalino and Tiramolla.
