= Winthrop (comic strip) =

American comic strip by Dick Cavalli

- Author: Dick Cavalli
- Current status/schedule: Concluded daily & Sunday strip
- Launch date: February 27, 1966
- End date: May 14, 1994
- Syndicate(s): Newspaper Enterprise Association
- Genre(s): comedy, gag-a-day
- Preceded by: Morty Meekle

Winthrop is an American syndicated newspaper comic strip that was published between 1966 and 1994, created and produced by cartoonist Dick Cavalli. The series—which derived its comedy from a group of children's nonchalantly world-wise observations—evolved from Cavalli's 1956-1966 strip, Morty Meekle, which featured adult characters.

== Publication history ==
Winthrop strip of October 2, 1972, depicting the title character and his father. The strip often derived humor from the juxtaposition of adult notions and concerns emanating from the mouths of children.

Gag cartoonist Dick Cavalli—whose work appeared in magazines including The Saturday Evening Post and Collier's—had achieved such popularity by 1956 that Writer's Digest observed he had "risen to the top faster than any other cartoonist in the business." On January 9 of that year, Cavalli launched Newspaper Enterprise Association's syndicated comic strip Morty Meekle, featuring the courtship of the title character and his girlfriend, Jill Wortle, as well as Morty's travails at his low-level office job under boss E.G. Boomer. The strip gradually deëmphasized the romance and work aspects in favor of what comics historian Maurice Horn called its "background chorus of snide youngsters with a perceptive take on the human condition." On February 27, 1966, Cavalli removed the adult characters and renamed the strip Winthrop, after Jill's kid brother, the most prominent of the young social critics.

Cavalli's art assistants on the strip included Bob Weber Sr. and Ray Osrin. After Cavalli had his second heart attack, Sam and Silo cartoonist Jerry Dumas substituted on Winthrop for three months, taking old syndicate-provided strips and writing new dialog and re-lettering them in Cavalli's style. The strip ended on May 14, 1994.

== Cast ==
- Winthrop Wortle: A little boy.
- Mr. Wortle: His father
- Spotless McPartland: A germophobe
- Chips: the family dog
- Nasty McNarf: The neighborhood bully.

== Paperback collections ==
- Winthrop: A Strip Coloring Book (Saalfield Publishing Company, Book # 2915 : Akron, Ohio, 1968). Reprints daily strips originally published 1966–1968.
