= Bob Mallard =

Cover of Bob Mallard: Mission Antarctique, illustrated by Sanitas and written by Roy. This comic is part of the modern continuation of the original Bob Mallard series created by Rémy Bourlès and Henry Bourdens.

Bob Mallard is a French aviation comic book series created by Rémy Bourlès (art) and Henry Bourdens (script), first published in July 1946 in the youth weekly Vaillant magazine.

== Background ==
Henry Bourdens, who led an adventurous life, brought an undeniable touch of realism (even autobiography) to the stories. A former fighter pilot in the Free French Air Forces and later a commercial pilot for minor airlines in Mainland Southeast Asia after 1945, he later embarked on a solo sailing adventure aboard a junk (similar to his contemporary Bernard Moitessier) and was stranded for two months on Bathurst Island, a journey he recounted in his book Croisière cruelle ("Cruel Cruise").

== History ==
While the first story in this adventure comic series with a realistic drawing style takes place during World War II, Bourlès and Bourdens soon return the hero Bob Mallard to civilian life. He then engages in various piloting activities (aerobatics, test flights, etc.) and primarily fights crime around the world, flying his favorite aircraft—joined in 1952 by his sidekick Puchonnet.

In 1957, Bourlès and Bourdens handed the series over to Francisco Hidalgo and Jean Sani, who gave the series more technical realism, albeit with a more static style.

In 1962, Hidalgo passed the torch to André Chéret, one of the most beloved artists at Éditions Vaillant. According to Patrick Gaumer, his arrival

"gave the series a second wind, with the artist’s powerful and dynamic style playing an essential role."

However, Chéret, increasingly busy with his new series Rahan, had to abandon Bob Mallard by the end of 1969, after which the series was discontinued.

In 1977–1978, the publishing house Jeunesse et Vacances released six issues of a digest-sized comic book magazine titled Bob Mallard that republished stories by Chéret and Sanitas.
