= Priscilla's Pop =

American comic strip by Al Vermeer

- Al Vermeer's Priscilla's Pop (August 29, 1970)
- Author(s): Al Vermeer (1946–1973); Edmund R. "Ed" Sullivan (1973–1984)
- Current status/schedule: Concluded daily & Sunday strip
- Launch date: July 7, 1946
- End date: September 11, 1983
- Syndicate(s): Newspaper Enterprise Association
- Genre(s): Humor, gag-a-day

Priscilla's Pop was an American gag-a-day comic strip drawn by Al Vermeer. Syndicated by the Newspaper Enterprise Association, it ran from July 7, 1946, until September 11, 1983.

Vermeer drew the strip from July 7, 1946, to July 17, 1976; Edmund R. "Ed" Sullivan picked up the strip after Vermeer's retirement.

== Characters and themes ==
The strip featured Priscilla Nutchell, a young girl who was obsessed with the idea of owning a horse, and her parents Hazel and Waldo Nutchell. Other characters in the strip were her older brother Carlyle, her two young friends Hollyhock and Stuart, and her dog Oliver.

Comics historian Don Markstein described the situation:

The young school-age daughter was, of course, Priscilla. She was, in every possible way, a perfectly normal kid, outrageous only to the extent that most people that age are outrageous. It was only Waldo who got exasperated trying to deal with her. The cast was rounded out by Priscilla's friend, Hollyhock (who liked to read and consequently had a lot of general knowledge swimming around in her head), and Hollyhock's nemesis, Stuart (who doubted most of the factoids Hollyhock expressed).

A constant theme of the strip was Waldo's lunch, which consisted of eating mashed potato sandwiches to save money until the mortgage was paid. Another theme was Priscilla's yearning for her very own horse. Sometime before the strip ended, money was found in the family budget to buy a horse. Waldo, however, was still eating mashed potato sandwiches.
