= Carlo Cossio =

Italian comic artist and animator

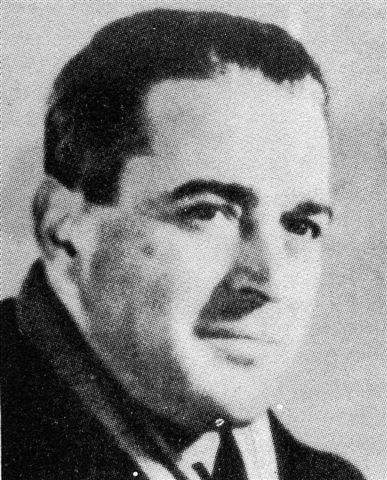
- Born: 1 January 1907; Udine, Italy
- Died: 10 August 1964 (aged 57); Milan, Italy
- Occupation: Cartoonist

Carlo Cossio (1 January 1907 – 10 August 1964) was an Italian comic artist and animator.

== Life and career ==
Born in Udine, Cossio started his career in 1928 as animator, realizing several short films in collaboration with his brother Vittorio. He debuted as comic artist collaborating with the children magazine Cartoccino dei piccoli, and then he got a large success with the comic book series Dick Fulmine, he co-created with Vincenzo Baggioli in 1938.

In the following years Cossio created and illustrated several series including Furio Almirante, Buffalo Bill, Kansas Kid, Tanks pugno d'acciaio, X-1, La Freccia D'Argento. In 1955 he decided to retire, making only an occasional return to comics shortly before his death for the comic book series Kolosso. He died of cancer in Milan on 10 August 1964, aged 57 years old.
