= Bob Thaves =

American cartoonist (1924–2006)

- Born: Robert Lee Thaves; October 5, 1924; Burt, Iowa
- Died: August 1, 2006 (aged 81); Torrance, California
- Education: University of Minnesota
- Occupation: Cartoonist
- Years active: 1960s-2000s
- Known for: Frank and Ernest

Robert Thaves (October 5, 1924 – August 1, 2006) was the creator of the comic strip Frank and Ernest, which began in 1972.

== Early life ==
Robert Lee Thaves was born on October 5, 1924, in Burt, Iowa, where his father, John, published local newspapers. His father died when he was 13.

Thaves's desire to become a cartoonist began in his childhood. He had no formal training; instead, he practiced by studying and drawing the works of other cartoonists. He was so skilled he could identify the cartoonist of a comic strip without looking at the signature.

He attended the University of Minnesota, where he received both a bachelor's and master's degree in psychology. His cartoons were published in the university humor magazine Ski-U-Mah and newspaper The Minnesota Daily.

During World War II, Thaves served in Europe in the Army's 89th Infantry Division.

He married his wife Katie in 1954, and moved with her to Manhattan Beach, California three years later. He enrolled in the Ph.D. program at the University of Southern California, but left before completing his degree due to the success of his business career.

== Career ==
While still at college, the first of his cartoons was printed in magazines. He continued to be interested in cartooning, and developed the Frank and Ernest strip while working as an industrial psychologist, occasionally selling comics to publications such as the Saturday Evening Post, True, and Cosmopolitan.

Frank and Ernest began appearing in magazines as early as the 1960s. It was first nationally syndicated on November 6, 1972. Frank and Ernest's distributor, United Media, said that the strip was carried by more than 1,300 newspapers and read by 25 million people. It was the first single panel strip to appear in the "panel" format, and the first to use block letters for its dialogue.

He also drew the short-lived King Baloo strip, which ran during the 1980s. Co-created with Scott Stantis, its format was identical to Frank and Ernest, but featured the titular King.

His son Tom began collaborating with him on Frank and Ernest in 1997. The elder Thaves had planned on transitioning his son to take over the strip before his death.

=== Ginger Rogers quote ===
In a 1982 Frank and Ernest comic strip, Thaves wrote about Fred Astaire: "Sure he was great, but don't forget that Ginger Rogers did everything he did, backwards… and in high heels." The official Ginger Rogers website credits Thaves and uses his original line. Often the quote is incorrectly attributed to Faith Whittlesey. Sometimes the quote is attributed to Ann Richards, who popularized the line in her 1988 Democratic National Convention speech, paraphrasing it as: "But if you give us a chance, we can perform. After all, Ginger Rogers did everything that Fred Astaire did. She just did it backwards and in high heels," though Richards credited television journalist Linda Ellerbee for giving her the line. Ellerbee said she heard the line from a fellow passenger on an airplane.

=== Awards ===
He won several awards for Frank and Ernest including the National Cartoonist Society Newspaper Panel Cartoon Award for 1983, 1984 and 1986. He won the H.L. Mencken Award for the best cartoon in 1985, and he was selected as "Punster of the Year" in 1990.

== Death ==
Thaves died of respiratory failure in Torrance, California at the age of 81.

=== Tributes ===
Several comic strips paid tribute to Thaves in the weeks after his death in 2006: Candorville on August 14; Arlo & Janis on August 29, and Prickly City (a strip written by his King Baloo collaborator Scott Stantis) on September 10.

== See also ==
- Frank and Ernest
