= Dick Fulmine =

Publication information
- Genre: Action/adventure
- Publication date: 1938-1955

Dick Fulmine is the title character of an action comic book series. He was created in 1938 by the sports journalist Vincenzo Baggioli (writer) and Carlo Cossio (artist).

== Background ==
The character, an Italian-American, is an undercover agent of the Chicago police, who often engages in fisticuffs. Fulmine was inspired by the boxer Primo Carnera. Fulmine's jutting jaw was a reference to the popular and propagandistic physiognomic iconography of Benito Mussolini.

Dick Fulmine achieved a great popularity in the Fascist era, and in reason of its success the comic underwent several interventions by the MinCulPop (the Fascist Ministry of Popular Culture) in order to make his stories more nationalistic and moral. In 1942, MinCulPop even forced authors to change the facial traits of the title character in order to make him more handsome, an event that was justified in the comics telling that the character had been subjected to plastic surgery.

With the outbreak of World War II, Dick Fulmine underwent an even more marked evolution to respond to changing political demands, turning from being a detective into a belligerent Italian soldier.

Following the war, the character's success start to decline, and the series was interrupted in the second half of the 1940s. In 1955 it was terminated.
