= Fantax =

Publication information
- First appearance: Paris-Monde Illustré #26 (1946)
- Created by: J. K. Melwyn-Nash (real name: Marcel Navarro) and Chott (real name: Pierre Mouchot)

In-story information
- Alter ego: Lord Horace Neighbour
- Partnerships: Barbara (wife); Murph (butler); P'tit Louis (assistant); Horace Junior, a.k.a. Black Boy (son); Barbara (daughter)
- Abilities: Exceptional athlete; Skilled detective

Fantax is a fictional superhero character from a French comic book series. He was created by writer "J.K. Melwyn-Nash" (a.k.a. Marcel Navarro) and artist "Chott" (a.k.a. Pierre Mouchot). The character was created in 1946 as part of the post-war revival of Mouchot's publishing company.

Fantax was the alter-ego of Lord Horace Neighbour, a British diplomat assigned to the United States. Fantax did not have any superpowers but was an exceptional athlete and skilled detective. His costume consisted of a half-hood, a cape, and a shirt emblazoned with a large "F". Neighbour also disguised his personality; being as sophisticated as Lord Neighbour and as street tough as Fantax.

Neighbour was assisted in his crime-fighting by Barbara, his fiancée and later wife; Murph, his butler; P'tit Louis, a muscular assistant; and eventually his children, Horace Junior and Barbara. Horace Junior later became the lead in his own series as Black Boy, first as an independent crime fighter and later as an FBI agent. Mouchot also planned on having Barbara lead her own series in the character of Barbara Tiger but this series never materialized.

== Publication history ==
The series began as a short-lived comic strip in 1946. It was soon moved to a comic book series in July 1946. Navarro left the series in 1948 in a dispute over ownership of the character. (In 1950, Navarro and businessman Auguste Vistel founded their own comic book company, Éditions Lug.)

The series was then written by Mouchot, Robert Rocca or Rémy Bordelet.

A new French censorship law enacted in July 1949 forced Mouchot to discontinue publishing the comic book. The character was moved to text stories in a magazine format, but this only lasted six issues. Five issues of a new comic book title, The New Adventures of Lord Horace Neighbour were published in 1950.

In 1955, Mouchot launched the Black Boy comic book series (some of which was reused material from the earlier Fantax books) and revived Fantax as a comic book series in 1959.

Mouchot was prosecuted by the government censorship board for the violent content of his comic books from 1955 until he was driven into bankruptcy in 1961.
