= Charles Forbell =

American cartoonist (1885–1946)

Charles Henry Forbell
- Born: September 11, 1885; Brooklyn, New York
- Died: April 15, 1946 (aged 60); Bayside, Queens, New York
- Occupation: Cartoonist
- Known for: Naughty Pete
- Notable work: Soosie the Shopper; Cuddles, an American Flapper at King Arthur's Court
- Height: 5 ft 8 in (173 cm)

Charles Henry Forbell (September 11, 1885 – April 15, 1946) was an American illustrator and cartoonist. He was born September 11, 1885 in Brooklyn, New York to Margaret and Charles Forbell as the eldest of four children. He graduated from the Pratt Institute and later worked for the New York World. Forbell produced cartoon series for the humor magazines Life and Judge, as well as advertisements and designs for companies such as Aetna, Planters, and Rogers Peet.

== Career ==
Forbell's masterpiece is considered to be the serial comic Naughty Pete, which was released over 18 Sundays in 1913. It has been described as having a "huge influence" on cartoonist Chris Ware. The character of Pete in the serial has been compared to Jimmy Swinnerton's earlier Little Jimmy, which appeared in the New York Journal in 1904. Forbell created several strips involving feudalism—In Ye Goode Olde Days, published in Life, and In Ancient Times, published in Judge—and used the concept of the flapper previously depicted in his 1925 work Soosie the Shopper to create his 1929 serial Cuddles, an American Flapper at King Arthur's Court, which was the first depiction of Camelot printed in American comics. The serial was initially distributed through the syndicate Key Features, but was picked up by Bell Syndicate in November 1929. The series ran for just over a year, and was the longest-lived of Forbell's newspaper comics. Reruns of the strip that omitted the word "flapper" from the title were printed in some papers throughout the 1930s.

For several decades, Forbell worked in advertising, producing cartoons and storyboards. He created both for Aetna and produced cartoons for the menswear company Rogers Peet, among others. He is credited with designing the mascot of Mr. Peanut for Planters, though not as its sole creator. Two characters designed by Forbell, the chefs Hap-Pea and Pea-Wee, were licensed by Pea Soup Andersen's in the 1930s.

== Personal life ==
Forbell married Elsie Knapp and had a son, Richard C. Forbell, some time around 1914. He apparently lived in Queens for much of his life.

He died in 1946, several months after suffering a stroke, at the age of 60 in Bayside, Queens.
