= Al Vermeer =

American cartoonist (1911–1980)

- Born: Albert Hermann Vermeer; 1911; Alameda, California
- Died: 1980 (aged 68–69); Humboldt, California
- Occupation: Cartoonist
- Known for: Priscilla's Pop

Albert Hermann Vermeer (1911–1980), known as Al Vermeer, was an American cartoonist. Vermeer created the comic strip Priscilla's Pop.

== Early life ==
Al Vermeer was born in Alameda, California in 1911 to Dutch immigrant parents from Utrecht, Netherlands.

== Career ==
While growing up in Oakland, Vermeer began his newspaper career as a sports writer. Eventually he moved to sports illustration work at the San Francisco News.

By 1945 he left the News to work with the Newspaper Enterprise Association and a year later his signature creation Priscilla's Pop was launched. Initially created as a Sunday, a daily version of Priscilla's Pop was soon added to the syndicate. Vermeer worked on the family strip for almost 30 years, before his retirement in 1976. The strip was inspired by Vermeer's own family. Vermeer was succeeded by cartoonist Ed Sullivan, who worked on Priscilla's Pop until the end of the comic strip's run in 1983.

== Death ==
Al Vermeer died in 1980 in Humboldt, California.
