= Clyde Lewis (cartoonist) =

American cartoonist

Clyde Lewis (1911–1976) was an American newspaper cartoonist for the Newspaper Enterprise Association syndicate (which became the United Feature Syndicate) and the King Features Syndicate.

His early work for the NEA included Hold Everything! and Herky.

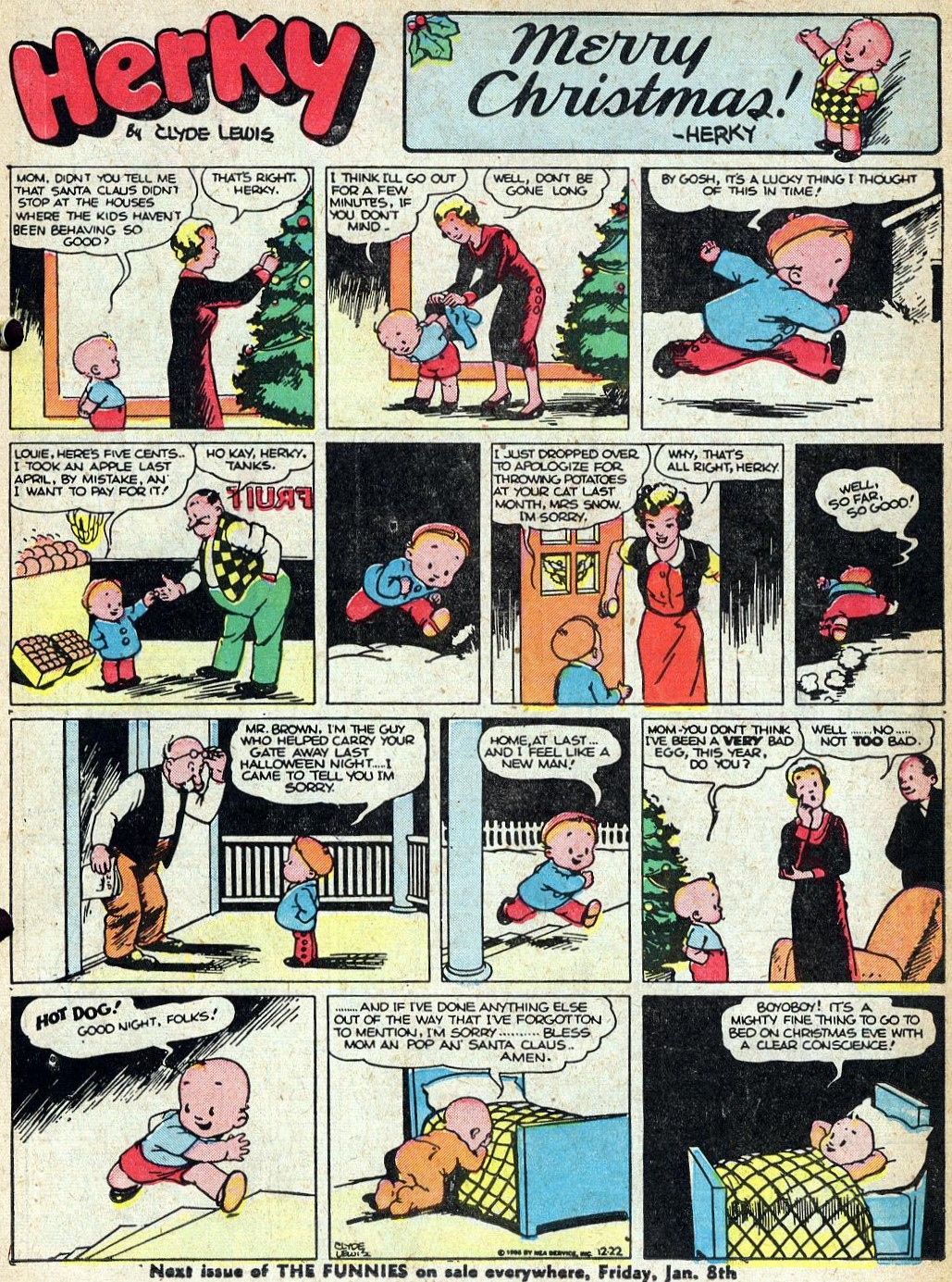
Herky – The Funnies, No 4 01

After switching to King he produced Snickeroos, which was retitled Pvt. Buck. He continued Pvt. Buck as a member of the US Army during World War II.

Lewis continued to publish Pvt. Buck until 1952, when it was canceled. His last work was for The Sacramento Union in the 1970s, when he drew The Sacramentans.
