= List of newspaper comic strips A–F =

Parent article: List of comic strips; Siblings: A–F • G–O • P–Z

== 0–9 ==
- 1 & Done (2015– ) by Eric Scott (US)
- 2 Cows and a Chicken (2008–2011) by Steve Skelton (US)
- The 5th Wave (1981– ) by Rich Tennant (US)
- 9 Chickweed Lane (1993– ) by Brooke McEldowney (US)
- 9 to 5 (1990– ) by Harley Schwadron (US)
- 13 rue de l'Espoir (1959–1972) by Paul Gillon, Jacques Gall and François Gall (France)
- 91:an (1932– ) by Rudolf Petersson and others (Sweden)

== A ==
- Aaggghhh (2017– ) by Ham
- Aaron & Chris (2006– ) by Aaron Sawyer and Chris Rusher (US)
- Abe Martin of Brown County (1904–1937) by Kin Hubbard (US)
- Abbie an' Slats (1937–1971) originally by Al Capp and Raeburn van Buren (US)
- Abie the Agent (1914–1940) by Harry Hershfield (US)
- The Academia Waltz (1978–1979) by Berke Breathed (US)
- According to Guinness (1974–1990) by Norris McWhirter and Ross McWhirter, Bill Hinds (US)
- Ad Libs (1958–1975) by Jim Whiting and Larry Hurb, and later Len Bruh and Joe Daley (US)
- Adam@home (1984– ), first titled Adam, by Brian Basset (US)
- Adam Ames (1959–1962) by Lou Fine (US)
- Adamson (see Silent Sam)
- The Adventures of Patsy (1935–1955) by Mel Graff, and later Frank Reilly, Charles Raab, Rich Hall, and Bill Dyer (US)
- The Adventures of Smilin' Jack (1933–1973) by Zack Mosley (US)
- The Adventures of Tintin (1929–1944) by Hergé (Georges Remi) (Belgium)
- The Adventures of Willie and Bill (1911–1913) by Brandt
- Agatha Crumm (1977–1997) originally by Bill Hoest, and later John Reiner, and Bunny Hoest (US)
- Aggie Mack (1946–1972), later titled Aggie, by Hal Rasmusson and later Roy L. Fox (US)
- Agnes (1999–2023) by Tony Cochran (US)
- Air Hawk and the Flying Doctors (1959–1986) by John Dixon (Australia)
- Akwas (1964–1972) by Mike Roy (US)
- Al Khan (2008– ) by Tarek Shahin (Egypt)
- Alec the Great (1931–1969) by Edwina
- Alex (1987–2025) by Charles Peattie and Russell Taylor (UK)
- Alexander Smart, Esq. (1930–1943) by A. C. Fera and later Doc Winner
- Alfredo (see Pepe)
- Aline (1996- ) by Adão Iturrusgarai (Brazil)
- All in a Lifetime (1935–1962) by Frank Beck (US)
- All in Sport (1952–1974) by Chet Adams (US)
- Alley Oop (1932–) originally by V. T. Hamlin (US)
- Alphonse and Gaston (1901–1904) by Frederick Burr Opper (US)
- An Altar Boy Named Speck (1951–1979) by Tut LeBlanc and later Margaret Ahern
- The Alumnae (1969–1976) by Mary Gauerke (US)
- Always Belittlin' (1930–1940) by Percy Crosby (US)
- Amal Aloy by Amal Chakrabarti (Southeast Asia)
- The Amazing Spider-Man (1977–2019) by Stan Lee and John Romita, Sr. (US)
- Amazing Superpowers (2007– ) by Wes and Tony (US)
- The Ambassador (1933–1934) by Otto Soglow
- Amber Waves (2000– ) by Dave T. Phipps
- (1972–1973) by Doug Wildey (US)
- The American Adventure (1949–1951) by Bradford Smith and Dan Heilman (US)
- Les Amours célèbres (1950–1972) by Paul Gordeaux (France)
- A. Mutt (see Mutt and Jeff)
- Amy (1961–1991) originally by Harry Mace (US)
- And Her Name Was Maud (1904–1932) by Frederick Burr Opper (US)
- Andy Capp (1957– ) originally by Reg Smythe (UK)
- Angel (1954–1963) by Mel Casson
- The Angriest Dog in the World (1983–1992) by David Lynch (US)
- Angus Og (1960–1989) by Ewen Bain (Scotland)
- Animal Crackers (1968– ) by Roger Bollen and later Fred Wagner (US)
- Animal Crackers (1937–1957) by Dick Ryan and Warren Goodrich (US)
- Annie (see Little Orphan Annie)
- Apartment 3-G (1961–2015) originally by Nicholas P. Dallis and Alex Kotzky (US)
- A. Piker Clerk (1903–1904) by Clare Briggs (US)
- Apple Mary (see Mary Worth) (1934–1939) originally by Martha Orr (US)
- Archie (1947– ) originally by Bob Montana (US)
- Arctic Circle (2007– ) by Alex Hallatt (New Zealand)
- The Argyle Sweater (2008– ) by Scott Hilburn (US)
- Arlo and Janis (1985– ) by Jimmy Johnson (US)
- Arnold (1982–1988) by Kevin McCormick (US)
- Art's Gallery (1962–1981) by Art Finley (US)
- Ask Shagg (1979–2020) by Peter Guren (US)
- Assorted Nuts by Nick Barrameda (Philippines)
- Asterix and Obelix (1977– ) by René Goscinny and Albert Uderzo (US reprint of French album stories edited into comic strip form).
- At the Zü (1995–1998) by Ron Ruelle (US)
- Aunt Tenna (1954–1976; see Channel Chuckles) by Bil Keane (US)
- The Avridge Farm (1987–2005) by Jeff Wilson (Canada)
- Axa (1978–1986) by Enrique Badia Romero and Donne Avenell (UK)

== B ==
- Babe 'n' Horace (1924–1968) by Edgar Martin and later Les Carroll (US)
- Babe Bunting (1930–1939) by Frank Godwin (US)
- Baby Blues (1990– ) by Rick Kirkman and Jerry Scott (US)
- Baby Mine (1930–1939)
- Babyman, first titled The Great John L. (1982–1985) by Don Addis (US)
- Bachelor Party (2002–2003) by Adam Miller (US)
- Back in the Day (2010– ) by Eric Scott (US)
- Backbench (–) by Graham Harrop (Canada)
- Bad Reporter (2003–2021) by Don Asmussen (US)
- The Badge Guys (1971–1973) by Charles Bowen and Ted Schwarz (US)
- Baldo (2000– ) by Hector Cantú and Carlos Castellanos (US)
- Ballard Street (1991–2019) by Jerry Van Amerongen (US)
- Banana Oil (1923–c. 1930) by Milt Gross (later known as Gross Exaggerations, The Feitelbaum Family, and Looy Dot Dope) (US)
- Bantul the Great (1965) by Narayan Debnath (India)
- Barnaby (1942–1952, 1960–1962) originally by Crockett Johnson (US)
- Barney Baxter (1935–1950) by Frank Miller (US)
- Barney Google and Snuffy Smith (1919– ) and (1934– ) respectively, by Billy DeBeck for both, and later Fred Lasswell for Snuffy (US), and starting in 2001 by John Rose (US)
- Baron Bean (1916–1919) by George Herriman (US)
- Basil (1974–1980) by Gerry Lants (Australia)
- Bat Masterson (1959–1970) by Ed Herron and Howard Nostrand (US)
- Batman (1989–1991) by Max Allan Collins and Marshall Rogers (US)
- Batman and Robin (1943–1974) originally by Bob Kane (US)
- B.C. (1958– ) by Johnny Hart (US)
- Be Scientific with Ol' Doc Dabble (1932–1935) by Harold Detje (US)
- Beau Peep (1978–2016) by Roger Kettle and Andrew Christine (UK)
- Beautyettes (1935) by Aldine Swank
- Beelzebub Jones (1937–1945) by Hugh McClelland (UK)
- Benny & Mice (2003–2010) by Benny Rachmadi (Indonesia)
- Beerkada (1999– ) by Lyndon Gregorio (Philippines)
- Beetle Bailey (1950– ) by Mort Walker, and later, Neal, Brian & Greg Walker (US)
- Belinda (1936–1959), first titled Belinda Blue-Eyes, by Steve Dowling (UK)
- Belles and Wedding Bells (1930–1943), first titled Sweethearts and Wives, by Cliff Sterrett (US)
- Belvedere (1962–1995) by Nat Greenwood and George Webster Crenshaw (US)
- Ben (1996– ) by Daniel Shelton (Canada)
- Ben Bowyang (1933–1979) originally by Alex Gurney (Australia)
- Ben Casey (1962–1966) by Neal Adams (US)
- Ben Wicks (1967–1987) by Ben Wicks (Canada)
- Benjy (1973–1975) by Jim Berry and Bill Yates (US)
- Bent Offerings (1988–2004) by Don Addis (US)
- Berry's World (1963–2003) by Jim Berry (US)
- The Berrys (1942–1974) by Carl Grubert (US)
- Bert (1977– ) by Kamagurka (Belgium)
- Best Seller Showcase (1977–1978) by Elliot Caplin and Frank Bolle (US)
- The Better Half (1956–2014) originally by Bob Barnes (US)
- Betty (1919–1943) by Charles A. Voight (US)
- Betty (1991– ) by Gary Delainey and Gerry Rasmussen (Canada)
- Betty Boop (1934–1937, 1984–1988) originally by Max Fleischer, and later Grim Natwick (US)
- Between Friends (1994– ) by Sandra Bell-Lundy (Canada)
- Beware of Toddler (2019- ) by George Gant (US)
- Beyond Mars (1952–1955) by Jack Williamson and Lee Elias (US)
- Beyond the Black Stump (1988– ) by Sean Leahy (Australia)
- Biddie and Bert (1962–1965) by Bob Donovan (US)
- Big Ben Bolt (1950–1978) by John Cullen Murphy (US)
- Big Chief Wahoo (see Steve Roper and Mike Nomad)
- Big George (1960–1990) by Virgil Partch (US)
- Big Nate (1991– ) by Lincoln Peirce (US)
- Big Sister (1928–1972) by Les Forgrave and later Bob Naylor (US)
- Big Top (1937–1938) by Bill Walsh and Ed Wheelan
- Big Top (2002–2007) by Rob Harrell (US)
- Billy the Bee (1954–1962) by Harry Smith (UK)
- Birdseye Centre (1927–1946) by Jimmy Frise (Canada)
- Bizarro (1986– ) by Dan Piraro (US)
- Blade Winters (1952–1953) by Lafe Thomas and Ed Mann (US)
- Blast Blair (1963–1964) by Keith Willingham (US)
- Bleeker: The Rechargeable Dog (2007– ) by Jonathan Mahood (US)
- Blondie (1930– ) by Dean Young; originally by Chic Young (US)
- Bloom County (1980–1989) by Berke Breathed (US)
- The Blue Beetle (1940) by Charles Nicholas (Jack Kirby) (US)
- Bo (1940–1956) by Frank Beck (US)
- Bobby (1938–1985) by Jerry Iger (US)
- Bobby Sox (see Emmy Lou)
- Bobby Thatcher (1927–1937) by George Storm (US)
- Bob the Angry Flower (1992– ) by Stephen Notley (Canada)
- Boes (1980– ) by Wil Raymakers and Thijs Wilms (Netherlands)
- Bogor (1973–1995) by Burton Silver (New Zealand)
- Boner's Ark (1968–2000) by Mort Walker and later Frank B. Johnson (US)
- Bonnie (1956–1965) by Joe Campbell
- Bonzzo (1998– ) by John Rivas (Puerto Rico)
- Boob McNutt (1915–1934) by Rube Goldberg (US)
- Boomer (1973–1981), first titled Mixed Singles, by Mel Casson and William F. Brown (US)
- Boomers' Song (1986-1989) by David Horsey
- The Boondocks (1997–2006) by Aaron McGruder (US)
- Boots and Her Buddies (1924–1968) by Edgar Martin (US)
- The Born Loser (1965– ) originally by Art Sansom (US)
- Borovnica (1992– ) by Darko Macan (Croatia)
- Bouford (1949) by Frank Borth (US)
- Bound and Gagged (1992– ) by Dana Summers (US)
- Boy and Girl (1956–1974) by John Henry Rouson (US)
- The Boy Friend (1925–1926) by Marge Buell (US)
- Braggo the Monk by Gus Mager (US)
- Brainwaves by Betsy Streeter (US)
- Brass Hats (1971–1972) by Chuck Livolsi and Ralph Brem (US)
- Breaking Cat News (2014– ) by Georgia Dunn
- Brenda Breeze (1940–1962) by Rolfe Mason
- Brenda Starr, Reporter (1940–2011) originally by Dale Messick (US)
- Brevity (2005– ) by Guy Endore-Kaiser and Rodd Perry (US)
- Brewster Rockit: Space Guy! (2004– ) by Tim Rickard (US)
- Brick Bradford (1933–1987) originally by William Ritt and Clarence Gray (US)
- The Brilliant Mind of Edison Lee (2006– ) by John Hambrock (US)
- Bringing Up Bill (1925) by Jack Farr (US)
- Bringing Up Father (1913–2000) originally by George McManus (also known as Maggie and Jiggs) (US)
- Briny Deep (1980–1981) by Don Addis (US)
- Bristow (1961–2012) by Frank Dickens (UK)
- Broadside (1986–2020) by Jeff Bacon (US)
- Bronc Peeler (1933–1938) by Fred Harman (US)
- Broom Hilda (1970– ) by Russell Myers (US)
- The Broons (1936– ) by Dudley D. Watkins (Scotland)
- Brother Juniper (1958–1989) by Fred McCarthy
- Brother Sebastian (1954–1971) by Chon Day (US)
- Brown Boys (1930's) by John Jay Humski
- Bruce Gentry (1945–1951) by Ray Bailey
- Brutus (1929–1938) by Johnny Gruelle (US)
- Buck Nix (1908– ) by Sidney Smith (US)
- Buck Rogers (1929–1967) originally by Dick Calkins and Philip Nolan; (1979–1983) originally by Gray Morrow and Jim Lawrence (US)
- Buck Ryan (1937–1962) by Jack Monk (UK)
- The Buckets (1990– ) by Greg Cravens; originally by Scott Stantis (US)
- Buckles (1996–2021) by David Gilbert (US)
- Bughouse Fables (1920–1937) by Billy DeBeck, and later Paul Fung and Jay Irving (US)
- Bugs Bunny (1944–1990) originally by Leon Schlesinger (US)
- The Bungle Family (1918–1945) first titled Home Sweet Home by Harry J. Tuthill (US)
- Bunky (1926–1948) by Billy DeBeck and later Fred Lasswell (US)
- Burn of the Week (1970s) by Mad Peck (US)
- Burntside (2008–2009) by Ray Denty (Canada)
- Buster (1960–2000) (UK)
- Buster Brown (1902–1923) by Richard F. Outcault (US)
- Buz Sawyer (1943–1989) originally by Roy Crane (US)
- B. Virtanen (1989– ) by Ilkka Heilä (Finland)

== C ==
- Caesar (1946–1960) by William Timym (UK)
- Café con Leche (2007–2014) by Charlos Gary (US)
- Calvin and Hobbes (1985–1995) by Bill Watterson (US)
- Campus Clatter (1969–1976) by Larry Lewis (US)
- Candorville (2003–2025) by Darrin Bell (US)
- Candy (1944–1971) by Harry Sahle and later Tom Dorr (US)
- The Candy Man (1981– ) by Bill Murray (US)
- Cap Stubbs and Tippie (1918–1966) by Edwina Dumm (US)
- Cappy Dick (1939–1987) by Robert Cleveland, and later Rick Yager and Bob Weber, Jr. (US)
- The Captain and the Kids (see The Katzenjammer Kids)
- Captain Easy (1933–1988) originally by Roy Crane (US)
- Captain Kate (1967–1972) by Jerry Skelly, Hale Skelly and Archie Goodwin (US)
- Captain Wings (1946–1947) by "Flowers"
- The Captain's Gig (1977–1979) by Virgil Partch ("VIP") (US)
- Carmichael (1958–1985) by Dave Eastman (US)
- Carnival (1939–1980) by J. A. Patterson and Dick Turner (US)
- Carol Day (1956–1967) by David Wright (UK)
- Carrie and Her Car (1923–1926) by Wood Cowan (US)
- Cartoonikus Dinkley (2024- ) by Shlomo Luchins (US)
- Casey Ruggles (1949–1955) by Warren Tufts (US)
- Catfish (1973–1994) by Reg Bollen (US)
- Cathy (1976–2010) by Cathy Guisewite (US)
- Cats with Hands (1999– ) by Joe Martin (US)
- Cattivik (1970– ) originally by Bonvi (Franco Bonvicini) (Italy)
- C'est La Vie (2003- ) by Jennifer Babcock
- Cecil C. Addle (1975–1997) by Ray Collins (US)
- Channel Chuckles (1954–1976) by Bil Keane (US); (1988– ) by various artists
- Charisma Man (1998–2006) by Larry Rodney (Japan)
- Charlie Chan (1938–1942) by Alfred Andriola (US)
- Charlie Chaplin's Comic Capers (1915–1917) by Stuart Carothers and later Elzie Segar (US)
- Charmers (1975-1981) by Hallmark Cards
- Le Chat (1983–2013) by Philippe Geluck (Belgium)
- Cheeverwood (1985-1987) by Michael Fry
- Chelsea Boys (1998–2007) by Glen Hanson and Allan Neuwirth (US)
- Chicken Wings (2001– ) by Michael Strasser (US) and Stefan Strasser (Austria)
- Ching Chow (1927–1971) by Sidney Smith, and later Stanley Link and Will Henry; (1975–1980) by Rocco Lotito, Will Levinson and Henri Arnold
- Chintoo (1991– ) by Charu has Pandit and Prabhakar Wadekar (India)
- Chip Collins Adventures (1934–1935) by William Ritt and Jack Wilhelm (US)
- The Chosen Family (1987–2004) by Noreen Stevens (Canada)
- Chris Crusty (1931–1940) by Charles Plumb and William Conselman (US)
- Chris Welkin, Planeteer (1952–1964) by Art Sansom and Russ Winterbotham
- Chubby (1918–1920) by Jack Farr (US)
- Chuck Billy (1961- ) formerly Hiroshi e Zezinho, by Mauricio de Sousa (Brazil)
- Cicero's Cat by Al Smith
- Cigarman (1997–1998) by Sam Gross
- The Circus of P.T. Bimbo (1975–1980) by Howie Schneider (US)
- The Cisco Kid (1951–1967) by Jose Luis Salinas and Rod Reed
- Citizen Dog (1995–2001) by Mark O'Hare (US)
- Citizen Smith (1967–1984) by Dave Gerard
- The City (1990– ) by Derf Backderf (John Backderf) (US)
- City Hall (1957–1984) by Dave Gerard
- Claire Voyant (1943–1948) by Jack Sparling (US)
- Clare in the Community (2004–2019) by Harry Venning (UK)
- Clarence (1924–1948) by Crawford Young, and later Cady, Frank Fogarty, and Weare Holbrook
- Clear Blue Water (2004– ) by Karen Montague-Reyes (US)
- Cleats (2001–2010) by Bill Hinds (US)
- Clemente (1973–2012) by Caloi (AR)
- Clementine (1965–?) by Bob Stevens (US)
- The Cloggies (1967-1986) by Bill Tidy (UK)
- Close to Home (1992– ) by John McPherson (US)
- Clout Street (1983–1984) by Dick Locher (US)
- Clovis and Tom-Tom (1960–1979) by R Eagle (Canada)
- Cobwebs (1986-1987) by Gary Brookins and Bob Gorrell
- Colonel Gilfeather (1930–1934) originally by Richard W. Dorgan (also known as Mister Gilfeather and The Gay Thirties) (US)
- Colonel Potterby and the Duchess (1935–1963) by Chic Young
- The Colonials aka Colonial Capers (1970–1976) by Joe Escourido (US)
- Color Blind (1998–1999) by Orrin Brewster and Tony Rubino (US)
- Comedy Corner (1961–1970)
- Committed (1994–2006) by Michael Fry (US)
- Common Man by RK Laxman (India)
- Compu-toon (1994– ) by Charles Boyce (US)
- Conchy (1970–1977) by James Childress (US)
- Condorito (1949– ) by Pepo (René Ríos) (Chile)
- Connie (1927–1944) by Frank Godwin
- Conrad (1982–1986) by Bill Schorr (US)
- Cooper (1985–1986) by Tim Menees and Mike Keefe
- Copps and Robberts (1979–1981) by Jerry Scott and Rick Kirkman
- Cornered (1996– ) by Mike Baldwin (Canada)
- Cotton Woods (1955–1958) by Ray Gotto and Don Sherwood
- Count Screwloose from Tooloose (1929–1935) by Milt Gross (US)
- A Couple of Guys (1996–2018) by Dave Brousseau (US)
- Cousin Juniper (1945–1954) by Gus Edson
- Cow and Boy (2006–2013) by Mark Leiknes (US)
- Cowboy Henk (1981– ) by Kamagurka and Herr Seele (Belgium).
- Crabby Road by John Wagner and the Hallmark Cards, Inc. writing studios (1997–2002; continued as a web comic to the present) (US)
- Crankshaft (1987– ) by Tom Batiuk and Chuck Ayers (US)
- Crawford and Morgan aka Crawford (1976–1978) by Chuck Jones (US)
- Le crime ne paie pas (1950–1972) by Paul Gordeaux (France)
- Crock (1975–2012) by Bill Rechin and later Brant Parker and Don Wilder (US)
- Crosstown (1934–1953) by Roland Coe (US)
- Cubitus (1968; comic albums: 1977–2006) created by Dupa (Belgian)
- Cul de Sac (2004–2012) by Richard Thompson, inked by Stacy Curtis (US)
- Curbside (1991–2008) by Robert Kirby (US)
- Curly Harper (1935–1944) by Lyman Young
- Curtis (1988– ) by Ray Billingsley (US)
- Cuties (1942–1970) by E. Simms Campbell
- Cynical Susie (1933–1937) by Laverne Harding and later Bernard Dribble (US)
- Cynthia (1946–1952) by Irv Novick

== D ==
- Daddy Daze (2018- ) by John Kovaleski (US)
- Daddy's Home (2008– ) by Tony Rubino and Gary Markstein (US)
- Daffy Demonstrations (1926) by Ray Rohn (US)
- The Dailys (1948–1957) by Stanley Link (US)
- Dan Dunn (1933–1943) by Norman Marsh (US)
- Dan Flagg (1963–1967) by Don Sherwood (US)
- Dark Shadows (1971–1972) by Ken Bald (Credited as 'K. Bruce' due to contractual obligation) (US)
- Dateline: Danger! (1968–1974) by Al McWilliams and John Saunders (US)
- Dave (1992–1999) by David Miller (US)
- Dave's Delicatessen (1931–?) by Milt Gross (US)
- David Crane (1956–1972) by Win Mortimer and later Creig Flessel
- Davy Jones (1961–1970) by Al McWilliams and Sam Leff
- Day by Day (2002– ) by Chris Muir (US) – webcomic, ran in newspaper syndication 2005–2007
- Day Shift (1953–1964) by Frank Adams
- Deathless Deer (1942-1943) by Alicia Patterson Guggenheim (writer) and Neysa McMein (artist)
- Deb Days (1927) by Charles Coll (US)
- Debbie Dean (1942–1949) by Bert Whitman (US)
- Debbie Deere (1966–1969) by Frank Bolle (US)
- Deflocked (2006– ) by Jeff Corriveau (US)
- Dennis Dull (1993) by Phil Young (US)
- Dennis the Menace (1951– ) originally by David Law (UK)
- Dennis the Menace (1951– ) by Hank Ketcham (US)
- Denver Square (1997–2008) by Ed Stein (US)
- Desperate Desmond (1910–1912), by Harry Hershfield (US)
- Diamond Lil (2008– ) by Brett Koth
- Dick Tracy (1931– ) originally by Chester Gould (US)
- Dickie Dare (1933–1957) originally by Milton Caniff (US)
- Diesel Sweeties (online 2000–, in print 2007–2008 ) by Rich Stevens (US)
- Dilbert (1989–2026) by Scott Adams (US)
- Dillon (1989–1992) by Steve Dickenson (US)
- The Dingbat Family (1910–1916) aka The Family Upstairs, by George Herriman (US)
- Dinglehoofer und His Dog (1930–1951) by H. H. Knerr (US)
- The Dinette Set (1990–2015), first titled Suburban Torture, by Julie Larson (US)
- Disney Christmas Story (1960–1987), by various creators of Disney
- Divot Diggers (1929–1940) by Dick Dorgan, and later Vic Forsythe and Pete Llanuza
- Dixie Dugan (1929–1966) by J. P. McEvoy and John H. Striebel (US)
- Dizzy Dramas (1927–1943) by Joe Bowers (US)
- Doc (1925) by Hy Gage (US)
- Doctor Funshine (1963–1966) by Bill Weber
- Dr. Guy Bennett (1957–1964) by E.C. Douglas and Frank Thorne (US)
- Dr. Kildare (1962–1983) by Ken Bald
- Doctor Smock (1974–1985) by George Lemont (US)
- Doctor X (1946–1947) by M. R. Mont
- Dog eat Doug (2004– ) by Brian Anderson (US)
- Doings of the Duffs (1914–1931) by Walter R. Allman and later Ben Batsford (US)
- Dolly Burns (see Spence Easley)
- Dok's Dippy Duck (1917–1925) by John Hager (US)
- Don Q (1975–1981) by David Gantz (US)
- Don Winslow of the Navy (1934–1955) by Frank V. Martinek and Leon A. Beroth (US)
- Donald Duck (1938–1995), nominally by Walt Disney, originally by Bob Karp and Al Taliaferro (US)
- Dondi (1955–1986) originally by Gus Edson and Irwin Hasen (US)
- Don't Do That (1950–1956) by Sylvia Robbins (US)
- Doodles (1985–2021) by Steve Sack and Craig Macintosh (US)
- Dooley's World (1972–1978) by Roger Bradfield (US)
- Doonesbury (1970– ) by Garry Trudeau (US)
- Dot and Carrie (1922–1962) by J. F. Horrabin (UK)
- Dotty Dripple (1944–1974) by Buford Tune (US)
- Down the Road (1920–1937), later titled Gas Buggies and Hem and Amy, by W. E. Buck and later Frank Beck (US)
- Downstown (1974–1986) by Tim Downs (US)
- Downtown Kid (2008–2009) by Matt Grant (Canada)
- Drabble (1979– ) by Kevin Fagan (US)
- Drago (1945–1946) by Burne Hogarth (US)
- Dramatic Events in Bible History by Walt Scott (1927–1929)
- Dr. Disaster (2021– ) by Ethan Balagna (US)
- Dream of the Rarebit Fiend (1904–1925?) by Silas (Winsor McCay) (US)
- Drift Marlo (1961–1966) by Phil Evans, Tom Cooke, and Mike Arens
- Droodles (1953) by Roger Price
- The Dropouts (1968–1981) by Howard Post
- Dudley D. (1961–1964) by Dave Gantz
- Duffy (1981–1996) by Bruce Hammond
- Dumb Bells (1925–1954) by Joe Cunningham and Gar Schmitt
- Dumb Dora (1924–1936) by Chic Young, and later Paul Fung and Bill Dwyer
- The Dumplings (1975–1976) by Fred Lucky
- Dunagin's People (1969–2001), first titled Tell It Like It Is, by Ralph Dunagin
- The Duplex (1993– ) by Glenn McCoy (US)
- Dustin (2010– ) by Steve Kelley and Jeff Parker (US)
- Dykes to Watch Out For (1983–2008) by Alison Bechdel

== E ==
- Eb and Flo (1967–1985) by Paul Sellers
- Edge City (2000–2016) by Terry LaBan and Patty LaBan (US)
- Eek and Meek (1965–2000) by Howie Schneider (US)
- Effie Spunk (1935) by F. O. Alexander (US)
- Egoland (1984–2009) by Ivar Gjørup (Denmark)
- The Elderberries (2004–2012) by Phil Frank and Joe Troise (US)
- Ella Cinders (1925–1961) by Bill Conselman and Charles Plumb
- Elmer (1926–1956) by A. C. Fera, and later Doc Winner
- Elsie Hooper (2002– ) by Robert D. Krzykowski (US)
- Elvis (2000– ) by Tony Cronstam (Sweden)
- Elwood (1983–1990) by Ben Templeton and Tom Forman (US)
- Em (2006– ) by Maria Smedstad (UK)
- Emmy Lou (1944–1979), first titled Bobby Sox, by Marty Links
- Ensign Bafflestir (1971–1974) by Ron Marlett (US)
- Ethan and Bruce (2020–2023) by Ethan Balagna (US)
- Eric de Noorman (1946–1964) by Hans G. Kresse (Netherlands)
- Ernie by Dave Gibbons (UK)
- Ernie (see The Piranha Club)
- Et Tu (1975–1976) by Dan Harper (US)
- Etta Kett (1925–1974) by Paul Robinson (US)
- Eva (2001–2017) by Felix Schaad and Claude Jaermann (Switzerland)
- Ever Happen to You? (1954–1965) by Bud Blake
- Everyday Movies (1924–1954) by various creators, including Denys Wortman
- Everyday People (1999– ) by Cathy Thorne (CAN)
- Executive Suite (1985– ) by Jack Lindstrom and William Wells
- Eyebeam (1980–1990) by Sam Hurt (US)

== F ==
- Fair Game (1996–1998) by Stephanie Piro (US)
- Fakta fra verden (2001– ) by Karstein Volle (Norway)
- The Family Circus (1960– ), first named The Family Circle, by Bil Keane (US)
- Family Tree (2007–2011) by Signe Wilkinson (US)
- Fan Fare (1948–1972) by Walt Ditzen
- The Fantastic Foster Fenwick (1968–1972) by Malcolm Hancock (US)
- The Far Side (1980–1995) by Gary Larson (US)
- Farcus (1991– ) by David Waisglass and Gordon Coulthart (US)
- Farley (1975–2007), first named Travels with Farley, by Phil Frank (US)
- Farming Today (1983– ) by Ernie Riggs
- Fat Cats (1998– ) by Charlie Podrebarac (US)
- Fatty Finn (1923–1933, 1951–1977) by Syd Nicholls (Australia)
- Featherheads (1926–1936) by F.O. Alexander (US)
- Feiffer (1959–1973) by Jules Feiffer
- Felix the Cat (1923–1946) by Pat Sullivan, and later Otto Messmer and Joe Oriolo (US)
- Fenwick (1977–1979) by Malcolm Hancock (US)
- Ferd'nand (1937–2012) originally by Mik (Henning Dahl Mikkelsen) (Denmark)
- Fetus-X (1999– ) by Eric Millikin
- Fiddlestix (1988– ) by Michael Pohrer
- The Figgers Family (1927–1928) by Victor E. Pazmiño (US)
- Figments (1971–1988) by Dale Hale
- Fingerpori (2007– ) by Pertti Jarla
- Finney of the Force (1925–1931) by F.O. Alexander (US)
- Fisher (1992– ) by Philip Street (Canada)
- Flamingo (1952–1985) by Matt Baker, and later Ruth Roche, ** * John Thornton, Thorn Stevenson and Ruth Schaefer
- Flapper Fanny Says (1925–1940), by Ethel Hays, and later Gladys Parker and Sylvia Sneiderman (US)
- Flash Gordon (1934–2003) by Alex Raymond (US)
- Fletcher the 4-H'r (1958–1986) by Joe E. Buresch
- The Flibbertys (1954–1972) by Ray Helle (US)
- Flight Deck (1998– ) by Peter Waldner (US)
- The Flintstones (1962–late 1990s) by Hanna-Barbera Productions
- Flo & Friends (2002– ) by Jenny Campbell, created by John Gibel
- Flook (1949–1984) by Trog (Wally Fawkes) (UK)
- The Flop Family (1945–1981) by George O. Swanson
- Flubs and Fluffs (1966–1988) by Jerry Robinson (US)
- Flyin' Jenny (1939–1946) by Russell Keaton (US)
- The Flying McCoys (2005–2018) by Glenn McCoy and Gary McCoy (US)
- Fluff (1968– ) by Nina Paley (US)
- F Minus (2003– ) by Tony Carrillo (US)
- Fogarty (1975–1976) by Bill Lee
- Foolish Questions (1908–1934) by Rube Goldberg (US)
- Footprints on the Sands of Time (1929, 1931–1937) by Clare Victor Dwiggins (US)
- Footrot Flats (1976–1994) by Murray Ball (New Zealand)
- For Better or For Worse (1979–2008) by Lynn Johnston (Canada)
- For Heaven's Sake (1991– ) by Mike Morgan
- Fortune Kookies (1973–1977) by Charles Glass
- Forever Female (1961–1974) by Dorothy Mylrea and later Eugene Craig
- The Fosdyke Saga (1971–1985) by Bill Tidy (UK)
- FoxTrot (1988– ) by Bill Amend (US) (NOTE: Sunday-only run since 2007)
- Foxy Grandpa (1900–1918) by Carl E. Schultze (US)
- Francie (1986–1996) by Sherrie Shepherd
- Frank and Ernest (1972– ) by Bob Thaves (US)
- Frank Merriwell's Schooldays by Gilbert Patten & Jack Wilhelm (1931–1934)
- Franka (1973– ) by Henk Kuijpers (Netherlands)
- Frankie Doodle (1934–1938), first named The Doodle Family, by Ben Batsford (US)
- Frazz (2001– ) by Jef Mallett (US)
- Freckles and His Friends (1915–1971) by Merrill Blosser and later Henry Formhals (US)
- Fred (1983–1992) by Leonard Bruce and Charles Durck
- Fred Basset (1963– ) by Alex Graham (UK)
- Freddie, the Sheik (1922–1929) by Jack Callahan
- Freddy (1956–1980) by Robert Baldwin (aka Rupe)
- Free Range (2007– ) by Bill Whitehead (US)
- Free Zone (1985–1990) by Winthrop Prince
- Friday Foster (1970–1974) originally by Jim Lawrence and Jorge Longarón (US)
- Fritz (1982– ) by various, including Fritz
- Fritzi Ritz (see Nancy)
- Frog Applause (2006– ) by Teresa Burritt (US) (see https://www.gocomics.com/frogapplause)
- From Earth by Ricky King (Canada)
- From 9 to 5 (1946–1971) by Jo Fischer
- Frontiers of Science (1961–1987) by Professor Stuart Butler and Robert Raymond (Australia)
- Frumpy the Clown (1996–1998) by Judd Winick (US)
- Funky Winkerbean (1972–2022) by Tom Batiuk (US)
- Funland (1933–1991) by Art Nugent and later Art Nugent, Jr.
- Funny Business (1942–1956) by Ralph Hershberger; (1969–1979) by Rog Bollen
- Funnyman (1948) by Jerry Siegel and Joe Shuster (US)
- The Funsters (1964–1986) by John Broudhecker
- Fur-and-Feather Land (1940s, 1950s, e.g. The Age, 7 June 1940)
- FurBabies (2023- ) by Nancy Beiman (Canada) (see https://www.gocomics.com/furbabies)
- The Fusco Brothers (1989– ) by J. C. Duffy (US)
- Fuzzy (1983–1992) by Leonard Bruce

== Sources ==
- Strickler, Dave (1995). Syndicated Comic Strips and Artists, 1924–1995: The Complete Index. Cambria, California: Comics Access. ISBN 0-9700077-0-1.
