= List of people from Barrington, Illinois =

The following list includes notable people who were born or have lived in Barrington, Illinois. For a similar list organized alphabetically by last name, see the category page People from Barrington, Illinois.

== Arts and culture ==
Name	Image	Birth	Death	Known for	Association	Reference
William Beckett		February 11, 1985		Lead singer of The Academy Is...	Resides in Barrington, graduate of Barrington High School	
Charles Boyce		September 21, 1949		Cartoonist, creator of Compu-toon and the KeyPad Kid		
Sam Campbell		August 1, 1895	April 13, 1962 (aged 66)	Author and nature writer	Lived and died in Barrington	
Kristin Cavallari		January 5, 1987		Actress (Laguna Beach: The Real Orange County)	Attended school in Barrington	
Bailey Chase		May 1, 1972		Actor		
Edward D. Dart		1922	July 9, 1975	Modernist architect		
Kallen Esperian		June 8, 1961		Lyric soprano	Born in Barrington	
William Fuller		1953		Poet	Born in Barrington	
Jeff Galfer		October 18, 1979		Actor, producer, writer	Graduate of Barrington High School	
Christopher Lasch		June 1, 1932	February 14, 1994	Historian, moralist, and cultural critic		
Marvin Lipofsky		September 1, 1938	Jan 15, 2016	Glass artist		
Connor Mackey		September 12, 1996		Hockey player	Born and raised in Tower Lakes, Illinois	
Charles L. Mee		September 15, 1938		Playwright		
Terry Moran		December 9, 1959		Co-anchor of Nightline		
Bill Moseley		November 11, 1951		Actor	Born in Barrington	
Colleen Zenk Pinter		January 20, 1953		Emmy-nominated actress, As the World Turns	Born in Barrington	
Veronica Roth		August 19, 1988		Author of the Divergent trilogy	Raised in Barrington	
Cynthia Rowley		July 29, 1958		Fashion designer	Raised in Barrington	
Yury Shulman		April 29, 1975		Chess grandmaster; winner of the 2008 U.S. Chess Championship		
Carrie Snodgress		October 27, 1945	April 1, 2004	Actress	Born in Barrington	
Richard Threlkeld		November 30, 1937	January 13, 2012	CBS news correspondent	Raised in Barrington	
Waid Vanderpoel		May 19, 1922	August 25, 2003	Author and former chief investment officer for First National Bank of Chicago		
Gene Wolfe		May 7, 1931	Apr 14, 2019	Author		

== Politics ==
Name	Image	Birth	Death	Known for	Association	Reference
Melissa Bean		January 22, 1962		US congresswoman representing Illinois's 8th congressional district	Resides in Barrington	
Ira Joy Chase		December 7, 1834	May 11, 1895	Co-founder of the Grand Army of the Republic, 22nd governor of Indiana, and first Barrington citizen to enlist in the Union Army	Moved to Barrington as a young man	
Kevin Furey		January 24, 1983		US congressman from Montana	Born in Barrington	
Gregory Garre		November 1, 1964		United States solicitor general	Was raised in Barrington	
Valerie Allen Marland		1917	1977	First Lady of West Virginia		
William C. Marland		March 26, 1918	November 26, 1965	24th governor of West Virginia	Lived and died in Barrington	
Henry Paulson		March 28, 1946		United States secretary of the treasury	Graduate of Barrington High School	
Richard J. Stephenson				Businessman and backer of FreedomWorks		

== Sports ==
Name	Image	Birth	Death	Known for	Association	Reference
Craig Anderson		May 21, 1981		Goaltender for the Ottawa Senators	Graduate of Barrington High School	
Bryan Bulaga		March 21, 1989		Offensive lineman for Super Bowl XLV champion Green Bay Packers	Born in Barrington	
Kirk Cousins		August 19, 1988		Quarterback for the Atlanta Falcons	Born in Barrington	
Gary Fencik		June 11, 1954		Safety for Super Bowl XX champion Chicago Bears	Graduate of Barrington High School	
Gary Hallberg		May 31, 1958		Golfer on PGA Tour		
Scott Langley		April 28, 1989		Golfer on PGA Tour, 2010 NCAA champion	Born in Barrington	
Jeff Likens		August 28, 1985		Defenseman for the American Hockey League and Deutsche Eishockey Liga	Born in Barrington	
Ryan Miller		December 14, 1984		Defender and midfielder for D.C. United	Born in Barrington	
Scotty Miller		July 31, 1997		Wide receiver for the Tampa Bay Buccaneers	Born in Barrington, graduated Barrington High School	
Dan Wilson		March 25, 1969		Catcher for the Cincinnati Reds and Seattle Mariners	Born in Barrington	
