= Hugh McClelland =

Hugh McClelland may refer to:

- Hugh McClelland (politician) (1875-1958), Australian politician
- Hugh McClelland (footballer) (1893-1970), Scottish footballer, see List of Bury F.C. players (1–24 appearances)
- Hugh McClelland (cartoonist)
