= Everyday People (disambiguation) =

"Everyday People" is a 1968 song by Sly & the Family Stone.

Everyday People may also refer to:

- Everyday People (Canadian band), an early 1970s Canadian rock band
- The Everyday People, an early 1970s American funk band
- Everyday People (English band), a band from 1990 featuring ex-members of Floy Joy
- Stanford Everyday People, a group of a cappella singers of MoTown, Soul and R&B at Stanford University
- Everyday People (album), a 2004 album by Nicole C. Mullen
- Everyday People (film), a 2004 drama film written and directed by Jim McKay
- Everyday People (novel), a 2001 novel by the American writer Stewart O'Nan
- Everyday People Cartoons, a cartoon, started in 1999, by Cathy Thorne

== See also ==
- "People Everyday", a song on Arrested Development's 1992 album 3 Years, 5 Months & 2 Days in the Life Of...
