= Brain wave (disambiguation) =

Brain waves are rhythmic or repetitive neural activity in the central nervous system.

Brain wave or brainwave may also refer to:

- Brain Wave, a science fiction novel by Poul Anderson
- Brainwave (character), two characters in the DC Comics Universe
- Brainwaves (comic strip), cartoon series by Betsy Streeter
- BrainWaves, a 1982 film directed by Ulli Lommel
- Brain Waves, a 2015 album by Eureka Machines
- Epilepsy Ireland, an organisation formerly known as "Brainwave – The Irish Epilepsy Association"
