= Fingerpori =

Finnish comic strip

- An example of wordplay in Fingerpori. In this strip, the main character Heimo Vesa buys regular "maito" saying "No onpa kallista!", "Well that's expensive!" when seeing the price of "kyytön maito". "Kyyttö" is a rare Finnish breed of cattle, "kyytön maito" is "kyyttö's milk". The wording can also be read as follows: "kyy" is "viper", "-tön" is a privative suffix, and "kyytön" is "viperless".
- Author: Pertti Jarla
- Current status/schedule: Current daily strip
- Launch date: February 2007; 19 years ago
- Publisher: Arktinen Banaani
- Genre(s): Humor, Wordplay
- Preceded by: Karl-Barks-Stadt

Fingerpori is a Finnish comic strip written and drawn by Pertti Jarla. It started in Helsingin Sanomat in February 2007, and is comprehensively distributed in major provincial newspapers. Literally, fingerpori is a thimble, but fingerporillinen is a proverbial small amount of alcohol, and Pori is a Finnish town.

== Setting and style ==
The main setting of the strip is Fingerpori, an imaginary Finnish small town. The main character in the strip is the eyeglass-wearing Heimo Vesa, but other citizens also appear, such as the brash-mouthed café worker Rivo-Riitta. As well as the Fingerpori residents, the strip has included characters such as the Pope, The Phantom, Spider-Man, Adolf Hitler, Kimi Räikkönen and Carl Gustaf Emil Mannerheim. A few strips, featuring Jesus, have caused controversy in some circles.

Some of the media where Fingerpori strips have been published have sometimes demanded changes to the strips and left some of the strips they claim are offensive unpublished. Sex, religion, and laughing at Adolf Hitler and corporations have been particularly sensitive points.

The humour in Fingerpori is largely verbal and is often based on (mostly untranslatable) wordplay and puns. For instance, Vesa works at the multidisciplinary research center Fingerpoli, where "girls with pigtails" is a result of a bungled stem cell experiment. Jokes are often also based on allusions, such as recurrent jokes about the skull ring of The Phantom. Besides this, the strips often have an absurdist element. According to Jarla, his original vision for Fingerpori was to create a milieu of an "East German Duckburg", but the current Fingerpori is more like a Finnish town still stuck to the 1970s as in Aki Kaurismäki's films. Although Fingerpori contains some political satire, the author claims it is not a political comic strip.

== Publication history ==
The original form of Fingerpori was a strip by the same author called Karl-Barks-Stadt, which won the third prize in the strip category of a Nordic comics contest at the Kemi Comics Days in 2006. According to the judging board, Karl-Barks-Stadt was "a really well drawn strip, whose unexpressionistic characters give a lively life to the joke told by the strip". After winning the prize, Karl-Barks-Stadt appeared in November 2006 in Ilta-Sanomat as the Finnish strip of the month. Karl-Barks-Stadt was Jarla's first continuous comic strip, he had previously only made short one-time strips to the humour magazine Pahkasika and worked as a graphic designer in the corporate world. The name of the strip is a portmanteau, referring to the East German Karl-Marx-Stadt (currently known as Chemnitz) and the cartoonist Carl Barks.

In the turn of the year 2006–2007, Helsingin Sanomat was looking for a new Finnish comic strip to its pages, and the newspaper's comics editor Eeva Lepistö turned her attention to Karl-Barks-Stadt. The strip, now renamed Fingerpori, started appearing in Helsingin Sanomat on 5 February 2007. It replaced Tiger, which had appeared in the newspaper for over 40 years and whose creator Bud Blake had retired in 2004.

Fingerpori is currently syndicated in Satakunnan Kansa, Aamulehti, Karjalainen, Keskisuomalainen, Turun Sanomat, Lapin Kansa and Etelä-Saimaa. Several strip collections in album format have also been published.

== Reception ==
In April 2008, the comics publisher Arktinen Banaani published the first Fingerpori album. The album, like the strip itself, received a mixed response. In Helsingin Sanomat, professor Olli Alho criticised Fingerpori because its humour is mostly based on homonym puns, which, Alho felt, do not interest the mature reader. Alho compared the strip's "view of the body and the soul" to the grotesque realism defined by Mikhail Bakhtin and its representatives, such as François Rabelais. In contrast, the Plaza.fi Kaista review praised Fingerpori as "the best new Finnish strip for a long time", and in a review in Suomen Kuvalehti, Jarla was praised for bringing Finnish pun humour to a new and fresh level.

== Albums ==
- Jarla, Pertti: Fingerpori. Helsinki: Arktinen Banaani, 2008. ISBN 978-952-5602-84-5.
- Jarla, Pertti: Fingerpori 2. Helsinki: Arktinen Banaani, 2009. ISBN 978-952-5768-17-6.
- Jarla, Pertti: Fingerpori III. Helsinki: Arktinen Banaani, 2010. ISBN 978-952-5768-40-4.
- Jarla, Pertti: Fingerpori 4. Helsinki: Arktinen Banaani, 2011. ISBN 978-952-5768-61-9.
- Jarla, Pertti: Fingerpori 5. Helsinki : Arktinen Banaani, 2012. ISBN 978-952-270-031-5.
- Jarla, Pertti: Fingerpori 6. Helsinki : Arktinen Banaani, 2013. ISBN 978-952-270-078-0.
- Jarla, Pertti: Fingerpori from Finland. Helsinki: Arktinen Banaani, 2014 ISBN 978-952-270-137-4
- Jarla. Pertti: Fingerpori from Finland XL. Helsinki: Arktinen Banaani, 2019 ISBN 978-952-011-951-5

== Magazines ==
- Jarla, Pertti et al.: Pikku Fingerpori: Kähmintää ja kytköksiä. Helsinki: Arktinen Banaani, 2008. ISBN 978-952-5768-12-1.
- Jarla, Pertti et al.: Pikku Fingerpori 2: Fingerpori rakentaa ja remontoi. Helsinki: Arktinen Banaani, 2009. ISBN 978-952-5768-18-3.
- Jarla, Pertti et al.: Pikku Fingerpori 3: kinkkuja ja kiusauksia. Helsinki: Arktinen Banaani, 2009. ISBN 978-952-5768-37-4.
