= Chicken's neck =

Chicken neck or chicken's neck may refer to the neck of a chicken, as well as the following:

- Siliguri Corridor, a narrow strip of Indian territory, connecting the northeastern states to the rest of India, surrounded by Bangladesh, Nepal, Bhutan and China's Tibet
- Rhyming slang for a cheque

== See also ==
- Chicken wing (disambiguation)
- Bird's Neck Isthmus, an isthmus in western New Guinea.
- Isthmus, any narrow strip of land connecting two larger landmasses and separating two bodies of water
- Meander neck, slender strip of land within a tight meander (bend) of a river which when eroded by the river creates an oxbow lake
