= GolfCross =

Variant of golf developed in New Zealand by Burton Silver

GolfCross is a variant of golf developed in New Zealand by Burton Silver. It is similar to golf, except that it uses an oval ball and holes are replaced by suspended goal nets. In addition, the green is replaced by a "yard", and a player whose ball lies in the yard has the right to turn the goal net so as to face them.

According to Silver, the oval ball is designed so as to give the player more control over where the ball travels:

The round ball is exactly right for golf which requires it to be hit along the ground as well as through the air. But if a game has no need for the ball to roll towards a target, the oval shape - which is easier to control - becomes an interesting alternative.

Because the oval ball spins on two axes, it is almost impossible to hook or slice it. However, controlled hooks and slices are easily achieved by angling the ball on the specially designed tee adaptor. Back-spinning the ball and running it on is also achievable by the way in which the ball is set up on the tee.

According to NZ player Greg Turner, GolfCross is a more strategic and tactical game than regular golf, especially in match play, and because players are shooting for goal it tends to be more dramatic and exciting to play and watch.

GolfCross can bring back advantages to normal golf. The mindset that the ball will hardly ever slice or hook can be brought back to golf and used effectively.

There are GolfCross courses in Germany, Argentina, England, Ireland, Scotland, and New Zealand. It is still unclear how widely GolfCross is played. Recent interest has centred on its ecological advantages. Because it doesn't use putting greens, agricultural chemicals can be done away with, and because the ball is easy for any player to backspin, fairways don't require irrigating to keep them soft in order to reduce run-on.
