= Chewy Louie =

2000 children's book by Howie Schneider

- Author: Howie Schneider
- Publisher: Rising Moon Press
- Publication date: May 25, 2000
- Pages: 32
- ISBN: 978-0-87358-765-5

Chewy Louie is a children's picture book by American cartoonist and author Howie Schneider, published in 2000 by Rising Moon Press. The hardcover book is 32 pages, with the last page featuring a bite mark. Chewy Louie is marketed for children ages 5 to 8. It was featured on Oprah Winfrey's kid's reading list.

Janet Marnatti of the Pittsburgh Post-Gazette described the illustrations as being "of Sunday-paper cartoon quality" and wrote that "they subtly complement the sparse text the same way the right space can make an otherwise bland dish taste great."

Chewy Louie tells the story of a family with a new puppy named Louie that begins to devour household items including tables, a model train set, the family car, and even the back porch. The family employs the help of a veterinarian (who simply explains that Louie is "just a growing puppy"), a trainer (who is ineffective and overly strict) and another trainer (who unsuccessfully attempts to solve the problem with a song). Upon deciding they cannot afford to keep Louie, the family plays fetch with the dog only to see that Louie returns the stick intact, meaning the dog has outgrown his chewing habit.
