= Why Paint Cats =

1994 comedy book by Burton Silver and Heather Busch

- Front cover of Why Paint Cats
- Author: Burton Silver
- Illustrator: Heather Busch
- Language: English
- Genre: Comedy
- Publisher: Weidenfeld & Nicolson
- Publication date: 1994
- Publication place: New Zealand
- Media type: Print (Hardback & Paperback)
- Pages: 96 pp
- ISBN: 0-297-83351-0
- OCLC: 31376281

Why Paint Cats is a humorous book written by New Zealand author Burton Silver and illustrator Heather Busch. It is one of three cat art books, including Why Cats Paint and Dancing with Cats. The book purports to describe the practice of "cat painting", the decorating of cats with paint. Some readers were concerned at the dangers of applying paint to cats, but the book's depictions are digitally manipulated.

== Reception ==
Critical reception for the book has been mixed to positive, with the SF site calling it "luscious, funny, and really, truly amazing". Publishers Weekly wrote that the book was "amusing as a novelty item" and that it was "so weird that it's sort of irresistible." The Hamilton Spectator stated that the book's contents were "spectacular". The Los Angeles Times wrote that Silver's writing was "tongue-in-cheek scholarly, complete with footnotes and a bibliography".
