= Ben Batsford =

American cartoonist

Ben Batsford (June 5, 1893 - February 11, 1977) was an American cartoonist. He is best known for a celebrity comic based on the puppet duo Mortimer Snerd and Charlie McCarthy.

== Biography ==
Batsford worked for the Winnipeg Free Press as an editorial cartoonist. He also served in France during World War I. After the War, he moved to America and became a police reporter. In 1921, he created the strip Billy's Uncle, which was syndicated by George Matthew Adams Service until 1926. After that he joined King Features Syndicate, where he drew Doings of the Duffs for a while. From 1929 to 1930, he drew Little Annie Rooney, and from 1934 to 1938, he drew Frankie Doodle. In 1939, he drew Mortimer and Charlie, based on Edgar Bergen's popular radio show, and in the early 1940s, he illustrated the comic book Helpful Herbert.
