= Chicken wing =

Chicken wing(s) or chickenwing may refer to:

- Chicken wings
- Chicken wings as food
  - Buffalo wing, a popular way of preparing chicken wings
  - Chicken wing rice roll, a popular Taiwanese dish of chicken wings stuffed with fried rice.
  - Swiss wing, a type of chicken wing in Hong Kong cuisine
  - Chicken lollipop, a chicken wing where the meat is cut loose, pushed down, coated in spicy batter and fried.

== Other ==
- Chicken wing, a defensive shot in pickleball
- Chicken wing (catch wrestling), maneuver used in catch wrestling
- Chicken Wings (comic), an aviation related comic by Michael and Stefan Strasser
- Chickenwings, fictional character from X-Men
- Chicken wing tackle, a move in Australian rules football and rugby league
- Chicken Wingz, a 2015 album by Moka Only
