= Why Cats Paint =

1994 comedy book by Burton Silver and Heather Busch

- Author: Burton Silver
- Illustrator: Heather Busch
- Genre: Comedy
- Publisher: Ten Speed Press
- Publication date: 1994
- Media type: Print (Hardcover)

Why Cats Paint: A theory of feline aesthetics is a comedy book written by New Zealand author Burton Silver and illustrator Heather Busch.

== See also ==
- Why Paint Cats
