= Eek & Meek =

American comic strip

- Author: Howie Schneider
- Current status/schedule: Ended
- Launch date: September 5, 1965
- End date: March 25, 2000
- Syndicate(s): Newspaper Enterprise Association (NEA)
- Genre: Humor

Eek & Meek is an American gag-a-day comic strip by Howie Schneider which ran from 1965 to 2000, syndicated by Newspaper Enterprise Association.

The strip featured the foibles of the two title characters. Eek, an aggressive alcoholic, was always seen with a bowler hat and a beard stubble. Meek was his timid sidekick. Supporting characters included Meek's love interest, Monique, rebellious kid Luvable and his friend Freaky.

The characters began as anthropomorphic mice, but morphed into humans as of the February 8, 1982, strip.

== Collected editions ==
- Eek & Meek (May 1969) OCLC 6113330 ASIN B0017QVM3A
- Eek & Meek: One More Time (February 1970) OCLC 34834369 ASIN B000KBDXHG
- Eek & Meek: Book Three (December 1970) OCLC 14003370
