= Belvedere (comic strip) =

American comic strip by George Crenshaw

- Author: George Webster Crenshaw
- Current status/schedule: Concluded gag panel
- Launch date: June 18, 1962
- End date: 1995
- Syndicate(s): Johansen International Features
- Publisher: Tor Books
- Genre(s): Humor, Dogs

Belvedere was a single panel comic strip created by George Webster Crenshaw which ran from June 18, 1962, to 1995. The star of the strip is a white dog with black spots. As of at least 2009, reprints of the strip were distributed by Johansen International Features.

== Characters and story ==
Belvedere is one of three pets who belong to a married couple, Orville and Emma. The others are Jezebel, a cat, and Chi-Chi, a talking bird. Belvedere never talks, but he is very intelligent and somehow makes his thoughts and desires known. He is spoiled and causes many problems for his family, the dogcatcher, and the butcher. Belvedere also makes trouble for the local museum (which displays dinosaur bones), and the veterinarian.

Al Wiseman, who co-wrote the Dennis the Menace comic book based on the daily comic strip (on which Crenshaw worked at one time), also contributed to the Belvedere strip.

== Books ==
Crenshaw's books include Belvedere & Friend (1982), All Dogs Must Be on Leash (1982), The Odds Are (1982), Now Just One Minute! (1983) Don't Push Your Luck (1984), Purpose of Loan: One Carload of Crunchie-Munchies, Hot Dog! (1987), Flapjacks (1990), Beware ... Obedience School Dropout (1991), How Was That for a Karate Chop? (1991), I Said I'm Not Ready to Get Up Yet (1991), Next Time I'll Pack the Food (1991) and Bone Pie (1992).

Crenshaw used the pseudonym Nat Greenwood on some books, including Belvedere (1965) and Belvedere: A Pooch Full of Tricks (1975).

== George Crenshaw ==
George Crenshaw
- Born: George Webster Crenshaw; October 23, 1917; Los Angeles, California, U.S.
- Died: September 6, 2007 (aged 89); Sequim, Washington, U.S.
- Resting place: Tahoma National Cemetery, Kent, Washington
- Other names: Nat Greenwood; George Crandall
- Occupations: Animator, Cartoonist
- Notable work: The Muffins (1957-1959); Gumdrop (1977-1978)
- Spouses: Eleanor Louise Arge (div. 1968) Betty Jean Sedam (m. 1980; died 1992); former wife of Richard B. Chapeta
- Children: 2
- Parent(s): Charles Robert Lafayette Crenshaw and Alpha A. Allen

George Webster Crenshaw went to UCLA and Harvard. He was an animator for Walt Disney, having worked on Fantasia, Pinocchio, and Donald Duck cartoons, as well as MGM Tom and Jerry shorts and Speaking of Animals for Paramount. He created the comic strips The Muffins (1957–1959), Nubbin (1958–1972), McGirk's Works (1959), Simpkins aka Nerdly (1971–1974) and Gumdrop (1977–1978) in addition to Belvedere.

His work appeared in such publications as The National Enquirer, The New Yorker, Woman's World and Reader's Digest. As a comic book artist, he drew Woody Woodpecker, Bugs Bunny and Disney characters.
