= Eugene W. Craig =

American cartoonist

- Born: September 5, 1916; Fort Wayne, Indiana, U.S.
- Died: March 18, 1984 (aged 67); Canal Winchester, Ohio, U.S.
- Occupation: Cartoonist
- Spouse: Joyce Craig
- Children: 2 sons, 2 daughters

Eugene W. Craig (September 5, 1916 – March 18, 1984) was an American cartoonist whose work was published in The News-Sentinel, the Brooklyn Eagle, and The Columbus Dispatch.
