= Paul Sellers =

British woodworker

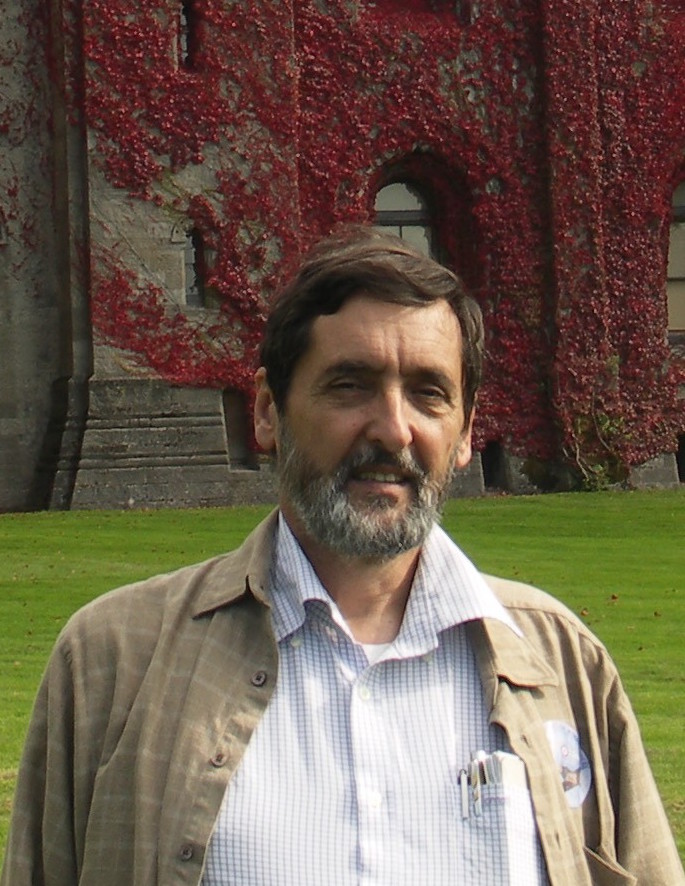
- In front of Penrhyn Castle, 2011
- Born: 4 January 1950 (age 76); Stockport, Cheshire, England
- Education: Apprenticeship
- Occupations: Furniture maker, writer and teacher
- Writing career
- Notable works: Essential Woodworking Hand Tools; Working Wood 1 & 2: The Artisan Course
- Website: paulsellers.com

Paul Sellers (born 1950) is a British woodworker, writer and teacher. He was apprenticed as a woodworker in the UK in 1965 at the age of 15. He moved to the US in 1984 and quickly became noted for his ability in traditional woodworking. He has and continues to teach people the craft of woodworking. He taught at the Homestead Heritage Woodworking School in Texas. During his time at the School he designed, and made with a team of craftspeople, cabinets for the White House. He started the New Legacy School of Woodworking that provides short courses. Sellers is the author of Working Wood which was published in 2011 and Essential Woodworking Hand Tools which was published in 2016. He then moved to premises at the Sylva Wood Centre in Long Wittenham, near Abingdon in Oxfordshire. Recently Sellers moved to larger premises in an industrial unit in Abingdon, Oxfordshire.

== Work ==
Sellers has established a considerable worldwide presence and following on YouTube, on his blog (PaulSellers.com) and his two websites (Common Woodworking and Woodworking Masterclasses) where he shares his long experience of woodworking with hand tools.

== Bibliography ==
- Paul Sellers (2011), Working Wood 1 & 2, United Kingdom: Artisan Media Limited, OL 28364124M
- Paul Sellers (2016), Essential Woodworking Hand Tools, United Kingdom: Rokesmith Limited, OL 28364015M
