= Pertti Jarla =

Finnish comic artist

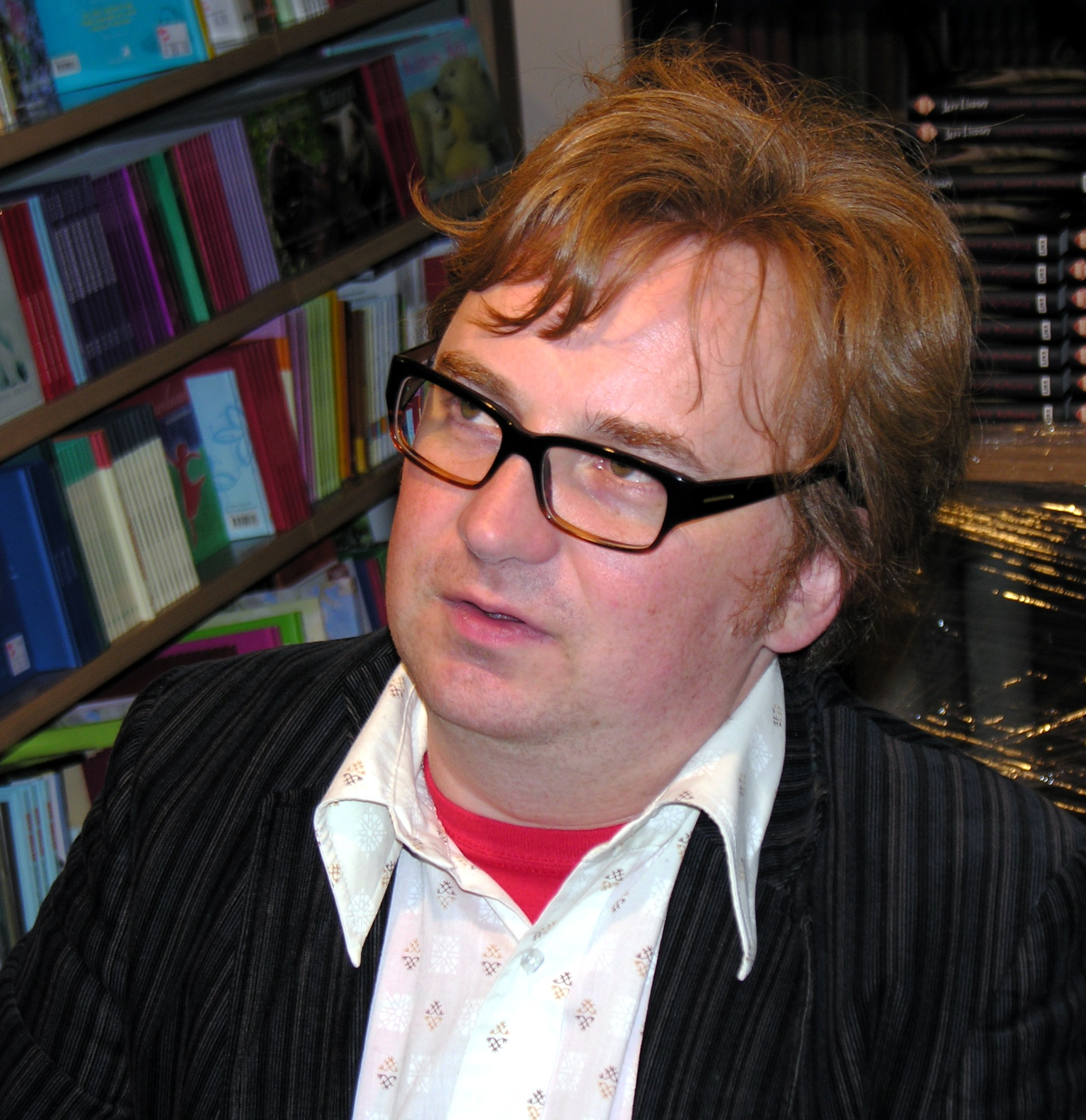
- Pertti Jarla in August 2008.
- Born: October 25, 1971 (age 55) Nastola, Finland
- Areas: Comic artist, sceptic, self-trained artist
- Notable works: Fingerpori

Pertti Olavi Jarla (born 25 October 1971 in Nastola, Finland) is a Finnish comics artist most famous for his humorous Fingerpori comic strip. Jarla's humor is strongly based on wordplay and he also deals with subjects which are testing the boundaries of political correctness. Jarla is a relatively famous person in Finland and is often interviewed by the Finnish media.

== Life and career ==
Jarla grew up in Nastola as the son of a farming family. It was noticed that during his school years, he was only interested in drawing. He considered the underground cartoonists Juho Juntunen and Gilbert Shelton to be his greatest role models. Inspired by Juntunen and Shelton, Jarla offered his comics to the humor magazine Pahkasika while attending high school. He became a long-time contributor to the magazine and, between 1991 and 2000, many of his comics were published in Pahkasika.

From 1996 to 2007, Jarla worked as a lecture visualiser at Jari Sarasvuo's coaching company Trainers' House, where he was tasked with drawing comics on topics during business coaching events. At the end of the event, the comics were duplicated and distributed to customers. According to Jarla, the feedback was mixed: some customers did not like the drawings at all, while others were so delighted that they ordered more illustrations from Jarla for their companies' publications. He also illustrated Sarasvuo's business training book Myyntikorkeajännitys (1998).

In addition to his drawings, Jarla completed visual arts and animation courses at the Laajasalo College, the City of Helsinki Youth Workshop and the Lahti Institute of Design.

In 2006, Jarla participated in the strip category of the Nordic Comics Competition in Kemi with his comic strip Karl-Barks-Stadt. It received the third prize and was published in November of the same year as Ilta-Sanomat's Finnish comic of the month. Helsingin Sanomat's comic editor Eeva Lepistö drew attention to Karl-Barks-Stadt and asked Jarla to be the paper's new cartoonist. The comic, which was changed to Fingerpori, was first published in Helsingin Sanomat on 5 February 2007. Nowadays, Fingerpori has also spread to numerous other magazines and several albums have been published about it.

In the 2012 presidential election, Jarla was a member of the citizens' delegation supporting Pekka Haavisto of the Greens. He illustrated the "Kakkonen on ykkönen" campaign website, which supported Haavisto and became one of the most clicked pages in Finland. Jarla also writes the blog "Tähän on tultu" published on the website of Suomen Kuvalehti, in which he takes a stand on current issues and talks about his own worldview, among other things.

From September 2020 to June 2024, Jarla worked as a cartoonist for Helsingin Sanomat.

Jarla considers himself a sceptic. He was married to comic artist Emmi Valve from 2016 to 2020. Jarla had previously been married to a woman named Jenni from 2007 to 2013.

Jarla's company Täysi Käsi Oy has published Poika Vesanto's comics Saku Sämpylä. Eetu and Riku : photo series from 1931–32.

== Publications ==
=== Fingerpori comics ===
List in the article Fingerpori.

=== Other comics ===
- Birds of Lapinlahti. Arctic Banana, 2011. ISBN 978-952-5768-64-0
- Captain Tserep. Arctic Banana, 2013. ISBN 978-952-270-079-7
- Jäätävä Spede – comic memoirs. Helsinki: Like, 2015. ISBN 978-952-01-1141-0

=== Book illustrations ===
- Sarasvuo, Jari: Sales High Tension (1998)
- Schatz, Roman: Zoo – An Animal Story (2009)
- Schatz, Roman: The Handbook (2010)
