= Bogor (cartoon) =

Bogor is a newspaper cartoon strip that ran from 1973 to 1995. It was created by New Zealand cartoonist and author Burton Silver (1945–present). Its characters include Bogor, a lone "woodsman poet" who lives in the forest by himself, and hedgehogs and snails who often get stoned on marijuana. Bogor regularly talks to the trees, and can also be seen writing books about the environment he lives in or laboring over 'annual examinations'. The hedgehogs' diet consists of snails, and since both species understand each other, make for some interesting dialogue. Bogor's attire predominantly consists of the classic New Zealand black singlet, short pants, or Stubbies, and boots. He is often seen wielding an axe or a chainsaw which he uses to cut down trees. Running jokes include how Bogor hates marijuana and condemns the animals he catches using it, and looking at the stars at night often brings out a philosophical side. There are also strips that focus on the animals and their interaction with each other. Predominantly focused on snails and hedgehogs, the jokes often include the ways in which snails try to hide from the hedgehogs and the ways in which the hedgehogs consume the snails, complete with dialogue between the two species.

Silver created the character of Bogor after five months living by himself in a remote part of Australia. Bogor first appeared in the New Zealand Listener in 1973.
