= Frankie Doodle =

American comic strip by Ben Batsford

- Author(s): Ben Batsford
- Current status/schedule: Completed
- Launch date: April 23, 1934
- End date: 1938
- Syndicate(s): United Feature Syndicate

Frankie Doodle, originally called The Doodle Family, is an American comic strip that ran from April 23, 1934, to 1938. It was created by Ben Batsford.

Frankie was the main character even when he lived with his family. However, they were all written out by 1935. Frankie is pursued throughout the strips by Mr. Shady, a disreputable lawyer who is after the fortune to which he is heir, and Mrs. Krule, who runs an orphanage. He has two Chinese mentors: Ming Low, a cook, and Captain Ku, a secret agent. He often has adventures in Chinatown, the North Woods, and the Wild West. The strip ran in 87 newspapers.

The strip was influenced by Little Orphan Annie - Frankie even has curly red hair. Ben Batsford had previously worked on Little Annie Rooney, which was also influenced by Little Orphan Annie.
