= The Dinette Set =

American comic strip by Julie Larson

- Author: Julie Larson
- Current status/schedule: Concluded daily gag panel
- Launch date: (self-syndication) November 16, 1990 (syndication) 1997
- End date: November 29, 2015
- Alternate name: Suburban Torture (1990–1997)
- Syndicate(s): King Features (1997–c. 2006); Creators Syndicate (c. 2006 – Feb. 2010); United Feature Syndicate (March 2010–Nov. 29, 2015)
- Genre: humor

The Dinette Set is a single-panel newspaper comic by artist Julie Larson. Set in the fictional Midwestern suburban community of Crustwood, the comic satirized middle-class culture; its main characters are 50-ish sisters Verla Darwin and Joy Penny. The comic poked fun at middle-class perceptions (and misperceptions) of common, everyday issues.

== Publication history ==
Larson's comic began as Suburban Torture in the Los Angeles Reader and other alternative newspapers on November 16, 1990. It was then syndicated daily by King Features from September 9, 1997, to 2006, when it moved to Creators Syndicate.

In January 2010, Larson announced The Dinette Set was leaving Creators for self-syndication. In May 2010, however, Larson signed on with United Feature Syndicate.

The strip continued until November 29, 2015, after which Larson retired from drawing.

== Format ==
The strip is a single panel comic that usually has two panels in most Sunday papers. It usually takes place in the Pennys' dining room or in their living room, or in the summer months, at their backyard pool. Much of the humor in the strip comes from the shirts the characters are wearing and signs hanging in the background. The characters are usually wearing T-shirts that have the name of a popular book or movie or TV show and then the saying, "on ice" (e.g., "The Jerk on ice") . Usually these pop-culture references have never been performed on ice. A lot of times at least one of the characters have a coffee mug that says "shut up" on it. In the scenes in the dining room, there is a to do list hanging in the background for humor. The strip usually has an object hidden in the picture for the reader to find known as a "find it". The main characters are Burl and Joy Penny; Joy's sister and mother, Verla and Ma; neighbors Marlene and Dale and their grandson Timmy; and occasional friend with a bad toupeé, Jerry.
