= The Avridge Farm =

The Avridge Farm is a comic strip created, written and drawn by Canadian cartoonist Jeff Wilson in 1987. The feature has appeared in dozens of community dailies, weeklies and farm specialty publications ever since.

The feature chronicles the trials and tribulations of hapless farmer Irv Avridge and his family as they adapt to farm life. This plot is further improved by the sarcastic and often inspiring asides by the family's precocious livestock. In 1993, Wilson published the treasury book Sincerely Chores, which features a collection of published Avridge Farm comic strips.
