= Burton Silver =

New Zealand cartoonist

Burton Silver (born 1945) is a New Zealand cartoonist, parodist, and writer, known for his comic strip Bogor and the best-selling book Why Paint Cats. He lives in South Wairarapa, New Zealand.

== Biography ==
Silver was born in 1945 and attended Wellington College, later completing a B.A. at Victoria University of Wellington in psychology and sociology and Asian Studies. He worked initially as a boilermaker's assistant on Groote Eylandt, Northern Territory, Australia and later as safari guide based in Darwin. Returning to NZ he developed and sold short skis, the Fiessen Resin 120 before travelling in Asia where he worked briefly as an advisor to the Indian High Altitude Warfare school in Gulmarg. At London’s Tulse Hill School in the UK he taught English as a second language.

His best-known cartoon series, Bogor, was written for the Listener Magazine and featured a lone woodsman and the forest animals that were his only companions (especially a hedgehog). An earlier cartoon, OB (written under the pseudonym "Roux"), had as its main characters a bird, a snake, and a rock, and was initially inspired by Silver's time spent in the Australian outback. Bogor first appeared in the Listener in 1973, and was New Zealand's longest-running published cartoon series.

He is well known in New Zealand for his spoof Country Calendar television programs like The Radio Controlled Sheep Dog, Rural Music, Non Stress Farming and Rural Fashions.

He is known internationally for his humorous cat art books (created in collaboration with painter and photographer Heather Busch: Why Cats Paint, Why Paint Cats, and Dancing with Cats, and the Museum of Non Primate Art, (monpa.com), as well as his spoofs Kokigami: The Intimate Art of the Little Paper Costume (Japanese paper decoration for the tumescent male genitalia, also in collaboration with Heather Busch), and The Naughty Victorian Hand Book: The Rediscovered Art of Erotic Hand Manipulation (with illustrator Jeremy Bennett). Other books include What Bird Did That? A Driver's Guide to Some Common Birds of North America (co-authored with Peter Hansard), The Kama Sutra for Cats (illustrated by Margaret Woodhouse) and Versability, a poetry game similar to Dictionary, where players create new lines for poems rather than new meanings for words (co-authored by his wife Melissa da Souza). His most successful book to date is Why Cats Paint that has sold over 750,000 copies worldwide. He has over one million books in print and been interviewed about them on television in the USA, Germany, and the UK. (The Daily Show, Jon Stewart, "The Man Who Loved Cat Dancing.")

One of his inventions is the sport of GolfCross, played on a golf course with aerial goal-nets and a golf ball in the shape of a rugby ball. There are Golfcross courses in France, Germany, Argentina, Scotland, England, Ireland, and New Zealand.

Silver's last project (co-authored with Martin O'Connor) was a relationship book titled "Everything He Hasn't Told You Yet: A New Way to Get Men talking About Stuff That Matters". The book uses the Scenario Method that works by putting a man at the center of hypothetical situations thus allowing him to share what he really thinks and feels. Everything He Hasn't Told You Yet was released in the United States in October 2007. The book received a starred review in the Library Journal (US).

Silver has also developed "The Fringe Games" (Fringe Games-Christchurch, New Zealand) which is an international festival of new and experimental sports designed to run in conjunction with the Olympic Games.

He lives with his wife near Martinborough in New Zealand and is currently working on a novel.
