= Beelzebub Jones =

Hugh McClelland's Beelzebub Jones (1937)

Beelzebub Jones was a UK newspaper comic strip created by cartoonist Hugh McClelland.

== Characters and story ==
The wild Western strip ran from December 28, 1937, to December 28, 1945, in the Daily Mirror newspaper. The sheriff character was based on McClelland's father, a farmer with a wooden leg.

After taking over as cartoon chief at the Mirror in 1945, he dropped Beelzebub Jones and moved on to a variety of new strips, including Dan Doofer, Sunshine Falls and Jimpy. In 1952, he exited the Mirror for the tabloid Daily Sketch. He launched his last strip, Jimmy Gimmicks in 1957, but it lasted only two months.

McClelland had a working method that expedited his production. He would pencil 20 weeks of strips at one session, writing dialogue as he progressed and then ink these in outline. Lastly, he would go back and fill in the blacks. This speedy working method enabled McClelland to continue producing Beelzebub Jones during his World War II military service with the Royal Air Force as a Sergeant Instructor on the Link Trainer.
