= Julie Larson =

American cartoonist

- Born: September 20, 1959 Lincoln, Illinois, U.S.
- Died: August 17, 2022 (aged 62) Lincoln, Illinois, U.S.
- Area: Cartoonist
- Notable works: The Dinette Set

Julie Harris Larson (September 20, 1959 – August 17, 2022) was an American cartoonist, most well known for her single panel comic strip The Dinette Set. The panel began in 1990 under the title Suburban Torture, and was syndicated from 1997 to 2015. The comic features the Penny family and their banal existence in American suburbia.

Larson grew up in a family of five kids in Lincoln, Illinois. Drawing was her hobby.

Larson played competitive tennis until college. She earned a B.S. in Architecture from the University of Illinois at Urbana–Champaign and spent the next eight years working in the design field. In 1989, after the first of her three daughters was born, Larson and her family moved from Chicago to the suburbs.

She began Suburban Torture in 1990, offering a satire on middle class culture. With the title changed to The Dinette Set, the panel became syndicated in 1997.

According to Larson's daughter, cartoon characters never age — however the writers do. This is why she put the curtain down on Crustwood and "The Dinette Set " in November 2015 to rest and retire. Larson died August 17, 2022. She was 62 years old.
