= Ray Collins (cartoonist) =

American cartoonist (1931–2021)

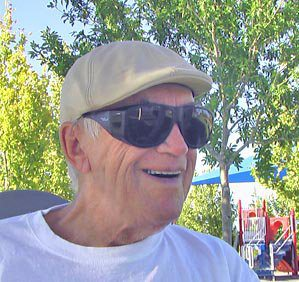
- Ray Collins in Boulder City, Nevada
- Born: Ramon Ward Collins; March 17, 1931 Poplar Grove, Illinois, U.S.
- Died: March 28, 2021 (aged 90) Boulder City, Nevada, U.S.
- Areas: Cartoonist, Artist

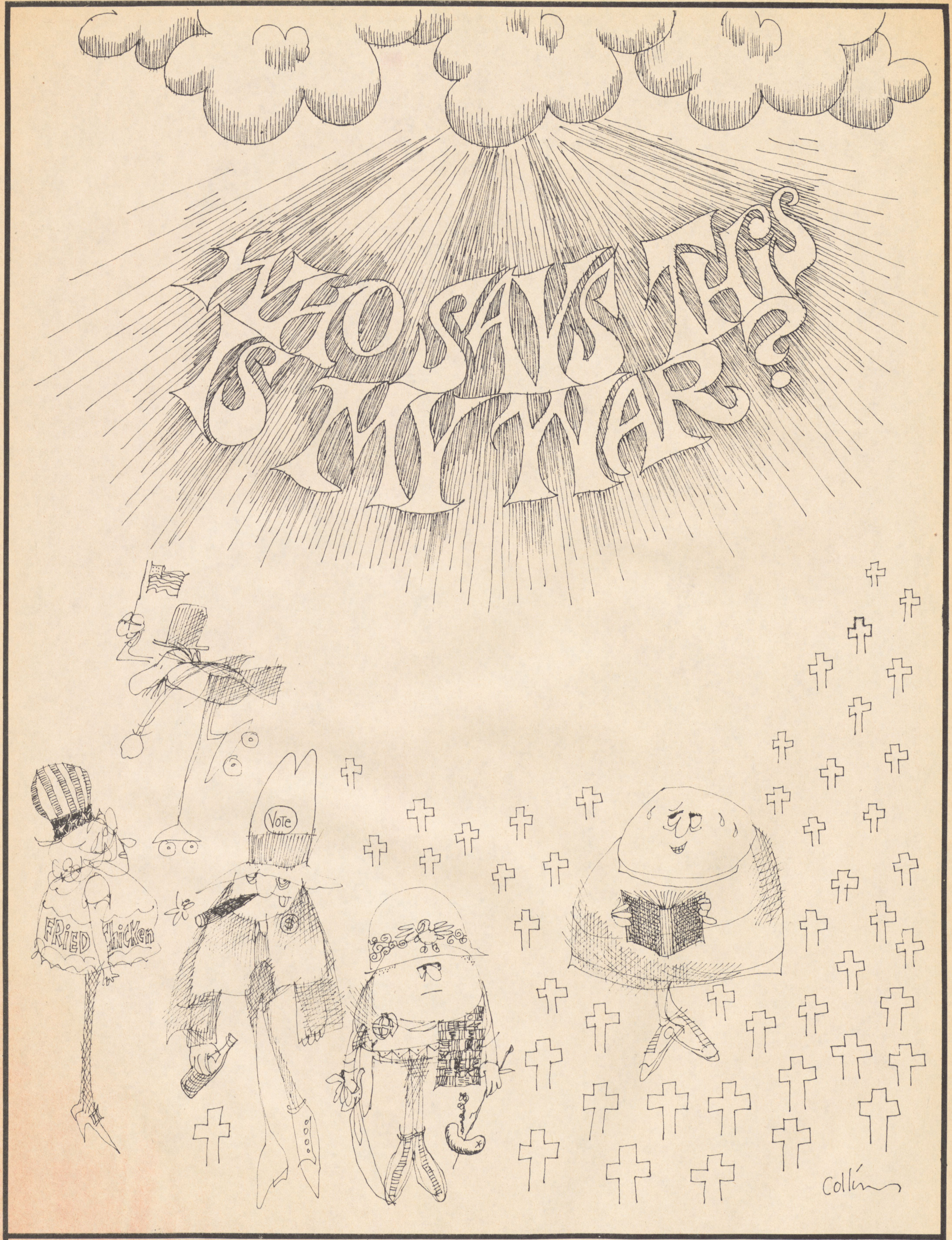
1967 Collins cartoon in the Seattle underground paper, the Helix.

Ramon Ward Collins (March 17, 1931 – March 28, 2021) was an American cartoonist who joined the staff of the Seattle Post-Intelligencer as a staff artist in 1950. He was appointed art director of magazines in 1964 and political cartoonist in 1970. Collins drew a comic strip titled Cecil C. Addle that appeared on the op-ed page from 1975 to 1979.

Collins left the Post Intelligencer in 1979, with a distribution agreement with the Chicago Tribune/New York Daily News Syndicate. Cecil & Dipstick appeared in Seattle, Palo Alto and Bogalusa, Louisiana, then stopped.

Collins worked in television from 1981 to 1985. His cartoons appeared in Pittsburgh, Columbus, Cincinnati, St. Louis, Dallas, Ft. Worth, Houston and Atlanta

Collins and his wife, Nicky, lived in Mexico for years. They moved to Boulder City, Nevada, where he continued to draw his strip for a local weekly paper until 1996. Cecil & Dipstick won four first place in the Nevada Press Awards.

Ray Collins died of amyotrophic lateral sclerosis (ALS) on March 28, 2021, at the age of 90.

== Publications ==
- Ray Collins. Dipstick & friends: With quotes from her royal guver-nuss. Working Press (1977).
- Ray Collins. Everything's great in '78: Further adventures of Cecil C. Addle and Dipstick. Madrona Publishers (1978). ISBN 0-914842-30-7
- Ray Collins. Zumbasoo: the adventure of ringle tang. Bright Ring Publishing (2001).

== Sources ==
- "Ray Collins". Lambiek.
