= Howie Schneider =

American cartoonist and author (1930–2007)

- Born: Howard Adolph Schneider; April 24, 1930; Bronx, New York
- Died: June 28, 2007 (aged 77); Truro, Massachusetts
- Occupations: Cartoonist, writer, illustrator, sculptor
- Writing career
- Notable work: Eek & Meek

Howard Adolph Schneider (April 24, 1930 – June 28, 2007), better known as Howie Schneider, was an American cartoonist, sculptor and children's book author who lived and worked in Massachusetts. His best-known comic strip, Eek & Meek, ran from 1965 to 2000 in more than 400 newspapers through Newspaper Enterprise Association.

== Career ==
After ending Eek and Meek, Schneider became the editorial cartoonist in a weekly cartoon called Unshucked, for the Provincetown Banner in Provincetown, Massachusetts.

On October 6, 2003, he launched a daily and Sunday strip, The Sunshine Club, which looked at the issues of aging and was distributed by United Feature Syndicate.

Other strips of Schneider's included Percy's World and Bimbo's Circus (aka The Circus of P.T. Bimbo). His cartoons were published in numerous magazines, including The New Yorker, Playboy, Esquire, Redbook and McCall's.

Schneider served 20 years on the board of the Newspaper Features Council and eight years on the board of the National Cartoonists Society.

Schneider was a two-time winner of Best Editorial Cartoon from the New England Press Association.

== Personal life ==
Schneider was in the Bronx on April 24, 1930, and lived in New York City for the first half of his life. He moved to Provincetown in the early 1970s, where he become involved in environmental activism, taking on development projects including a radar project at Otis Air Force Base. Initially Schneider held onto his walkup apartment in Greenwich Village that cost $400 per month, but became a full-time resident in the late 1970s. He became a known member of the community, and in 1986 he and others launched the Year-rounders Festival in Provincetown to celebrate the vacation town's full-time residents.

Schneider frequently filled sketchbooks with scenes he observed. In addition to being an illustrator, Schneider was a sculptor who worked in plaster, bronze, terracotta, as well as everyday items such as vegetables.

Schneider married Susan Seligson in 1992. The couple lived in Truro, Massachusetts for Schneider's final years. He had two sons from a previous marriage.

In 2007, Schneider died of complications from heart bypass surgery at Massachusetts General Hospital.

== Bibliography ==
- The Deceivers (Doubleday, 1961) (ASIN B0007ENUTC)
- Mom's the Word (World, 1968) (ASIN B0020JS2N6)
- Eek and Meek (1969) (ASIN B000I16GW2)
- The Circus of P. T. Bimbo (Grosset & Dunlap, 1976)
- Amos: The Story of an Old Dog and His Couch (Putnam, 1992)
- No Dogs Allowed (Putnam, 1995)
- Chewy Louie (Rising Moon, 2000)
- Howie Schneider Unshucked: A Cartoon Collection About the Cape the Country & Life Itself (On Cape Publications, 2002)
- Wilky the White House Cockroach, (Putnam, 2006)
