= Tiger (comic strip) =

American comic strip by Bud Blake

- Author: Bud Blake
- Launch date: May 3, 1965
- End date: 2004
- Publisher: King Features Syndicate
- Genre: Humor

Tiger was an American comic strip created by cartoonist Bud Blake. It ran from May 3, 1965 until 2004.

== Publication history ==
Launched May 3, 1965, the strip about a group of suburban boyhood pals was distributed by King Features Syndicate to 400 newspapers worldwide at its peak.

Blake drew the strip until he was 85, two years before his death on December 26, 2005. Asked if he could continue to produce the strip, Blake told an interviewer, "Sure, I could keep doing it. But I can’t. I’ve had enough." After Blake retired, the strip continued to appear as reprints. According to the syndicate, as of December 2005, Tiger was running in more than 100 newspapers in 11 countries.

== Characters and story ==
Tiger followed a gag-a-day format and was designed to appeal to both adults and children. It centered on a scrappy group of school-aged kids in an unidentified, middle-class neighborhood. Parents and teachers were occasionally referred to, but no adult was ever pictured. Tiger was told from a child's perspective and retained its innocent kids' eye world view from beginning to end.

- Tiger: The unofficial gang leader was a typical, everyman kid, clad in a loose-fitting white sweatshirt with the number 5 on the front and an oversized baseball cap which covered his eyes.
- Punkinhead: Tiger's precocious kid brother, naïve but occasionally insightful, who wore a red hooded sweater, sneakers with perpetually untied laces, an incongruously long, polka-dotted necktie and an ever-present cowlick.
- Hugo: Pudgy and none-too-bright, Tiger's best friend Hugo sported a red crewcut, a single baby tooth and an unquenchable appetite. Something of a craftsman, he expressed himself by nailing boards to other boards, rarely with a clear objective.
- Bonnie: A pushy, wisecracking neighborhood girl with black bobbed bangs and a loud, sarcastic demeanor.
- Suzy: The frequent target of Bonnie's barbs (along with Hugo), the soft-spoken Suzy wore long blonde tresses, black leotards and white Mary Jane shoes.
- Julian: The smart, bespectacled neighborhood bookworm.
- Stripe: Tiger's agreeable, faithful, lazy and ever-present spotted mutt.

== Awards ==
The National Cartoonists Society named Tiger the best humor strip in 1970, 1978 and 2000, with an additional nomination in 1998.

== Assessment ==
Comics artist Joe Kubert said of Blake, "I know his work, and I've always enjoyed it. He was a wonderful artist and a wonderful cartoonist."

== Collections and reprints ==
- Charlton Comics published eight issues of a comic book version of the strip, from March 1970 to January 1971.
- Tiger (No. 1) by Bud Blake (1969) Tempo Books
- Tiger Turns On (No. 2) by Bud Blake (1970) Tempo Books
