= Ensign Bafflestir =

Cartoon strip

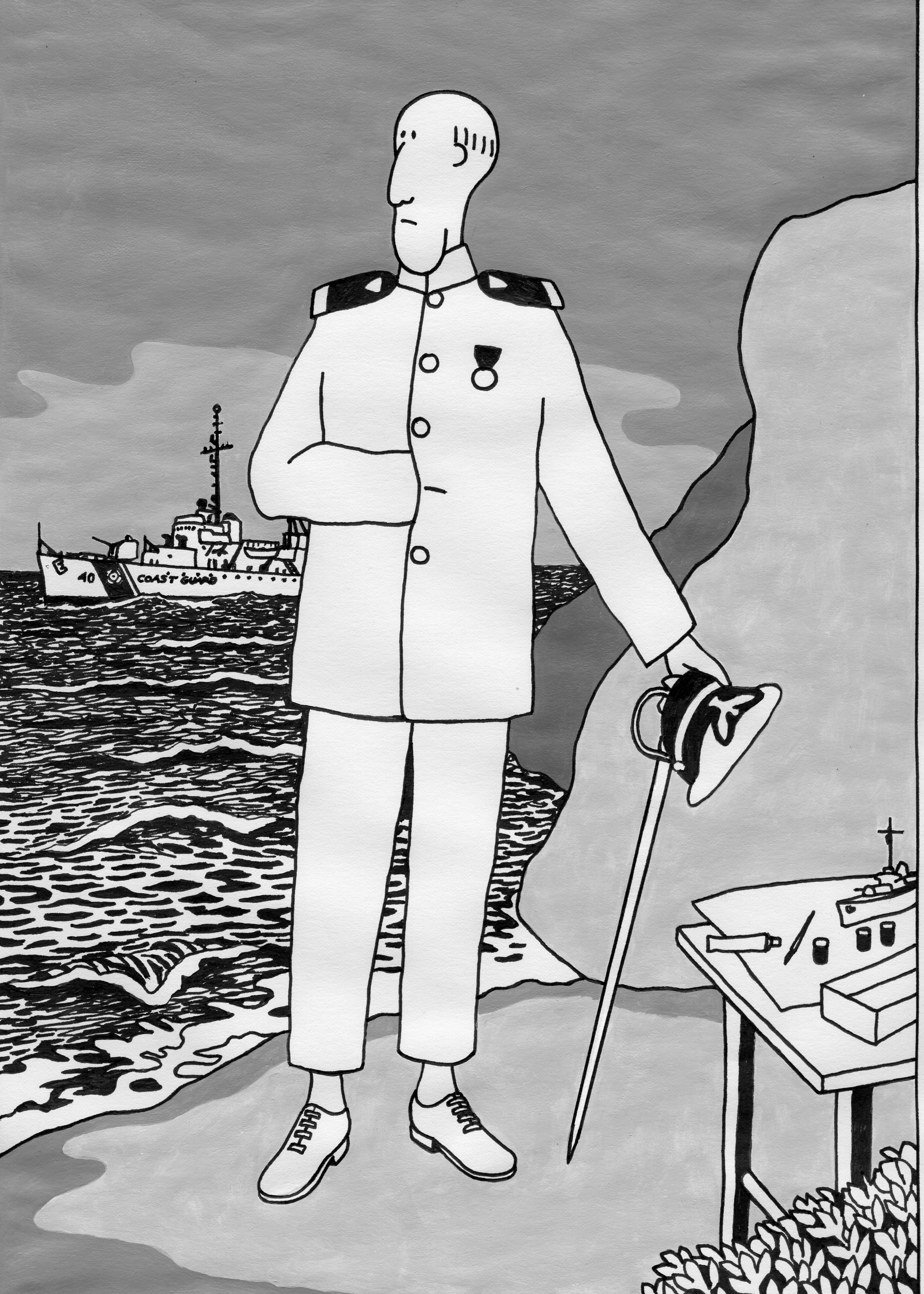
Ensign Bafflestir by artist Ron Marlett

Ensign Bafflestir is a cartoon strip created by the artist Ron Marlett during his enlistment in the United States Coast Guard. The cartoon ran from 1971 to 1974 in the US Coast Guard publication Pacific Shield, and featured a tongue-in-cheek look at daily life in the Coast Guard, as expressed through the exploits of a fictional ensign.

== Background ==
As a teenager, Marlett's sense of humor was influenced by Mad magazine, especially the one-page cartoon strips contributed by Don Martin. In 1970, Ron joined the Coast Guard and was stationed aboard the 255-foot cutter Winnebago, homeported at Honolulu, Hawaii. The following year, the Coast Guard District Office was in need of a driver who would also serve as a representative in their Public Relations office. Ron was chosen for the position, and within a couple of weeks was spending most of his time answering the public relations phone and working on a monthly news magazine called Pacific Shield. The public relations officer Lt Gary Boyer came up with the idea of having Ron create a small cartoon strip that would run every month in Pacific Shield. Ron drew a four-panel strip, and JO1 (Journalist 1st Class) Jim Gilman wrote the dialogue for the characters. Gilman named the tall, skinny ensign in the strip "Ensign Bafflestir;" Ron liked the name so much that the next issue of Pacific Shield saw the strip christened Ensign Bafflestir. Ron took over the responsibility of writing his own storyboard, and the strip eventually became a full-page piece. Ensign Bafflestir became famous within the Coast Guard, and Ron enjoyed an unusual working relationship with the commissioned officers. After Ron's discharge from active service in 1974, he pursued a career in the fine arts, and Ensign Bafflestir was shelved.

== Setting ==
The adventures of Ensign Bafflestir take place in the 14th Coast Guard District, which encompasses the Hawaiian Islands, Guam, and American Samoa in the early 1970s. The main characters were assigned not to one station, but to different stations, depending upon how the location served the storyboard. The locations included cutters stationed at the Coast Guard Base on Sand Island, Honolulu, Hawaii, and various aircraft at Barbers Point Air Station. Other locations are imaginary, such as the Chung Wong's Polynesian Restaurant and the Coast Guard One Man Station.

== Characters ==
Ensign Bafflestir is a tall and skinny ensign with an adult-child demeanor. Bafflestir's devotion to the Coast Guard is matched by his enthusiasm to perform every task in his life to the extreme.

Captain Doinkadilly is a captain who has adopted a short-fused temper and uncontrolled rage to compensate for his small physical statue. Like Bafflestir, Doinkadilly takes his life too seriously and becomes easily disappointed in his experiences.

Chief Barnflower is a large, overweight chief boatswain's mate who is constantly eating while overseeing the deck department. He dislikes officers, and expresses his frustrations by tormenting the sailors under his command.

Seaman is a curly-haired, small young seaman who becomes the innocent victim of Ensign Bafflestir, Captain Doinkadilly, and Chief Barnflower's predicaments. His youthful appearance represents the contrast in age between new recruits and older career personnel.

== Popularity ==
After spending a year aboard the USCGC Winnebago, Seaman Ron Marlett was transferred to the district office in Honolulu. His duties included being a driver for the District Office and working as an artist on the Pacific Shield, a monthly publication that presented interesting stories and news for the coastguardsmen and their families living in the 14th Coast Guard District. Ensign Bafflestir started as a small, four-panel gag about coastguardsmen concealing long hair beneath their hats. JO1 Jim Gilman conceived and wrote the first cartoon and had Ron illustrate the story. After receiving positive feedback from the 14th Coast Guard District Commander, Admiral Prins, the Admiral's Aide, Lieutenant Gary Boyer, gave Ron creative control of the cartoon along with the request that Bafflestir fill a whole page in future publications of Pacific Shield. Ron's sense of humor originated from the pages of MAD magazine, especially its featured cartoonist, Don Martin. When Ron took the responsibility of writing his own cartoon strip., he applied his style of exaggeration toward military cliches and Coast Guard culture, which instantly catapulted Ensign Bafflestir into a controversial arena within the Coast Guard. Some coastguardsmen and their families saw Ensign Bafflestir as amusing entertainment, while others saw it as undermining military discipline and promoting unfair criticism of the service they devoted their lives to. African Americans serving in the Coast Guard during the early 1970s embraced the cartoon as a symbol of their fight for social equality. Seaman's curly hair and broad nose made the character easily identifiable to blacks, who saw Seaman as a black being treated unfairly by Bafflestir, Doinkadilly, and Barnflower. After a year of publication, Ensign Bafflestir was circulated in other Coast Guard Districts. Coastguardsman Jim Castagnera from the 9th Coast Guard District wrote a several page spread on Ron Marlett titled The View From Here, which appeared in the 9th District's news magazine Shipmates. Castagnera included several Ensign Bafflestir pieces and compared Marlett to the famous military cartoonist Bill Mauldin. During an admirals' conference in Washington DC, some admirals voiced their opposition toward Ensign Bafflestir and complained that Ron's cartoons promoted insubordination within the ranks. Admiral Prins defended the cartoon strip, proclaiming that Ensign Bafflestir was good for morale because it provided entertainment that coastguardsmen could relate to. This belief was shared by the majority of district commanders.

In 1973, Admiral Morrison replaced Admiral Prins as District Commander and Lieutenant Mark O'Hare replaced Lieutenant Boyer as Admiral's Aide. The change of command was favorable toward Marlett's cartoons, except for one incident: Marlett created a storyboard that poked fun at a recent district inspection that the admiral planned and managed. Admiral Morrison called Marlett to his office and made it clear how offended he was with the cartoon. Marlett apologized to the admiral and the offending storyboard was replaced with another idea. After the uncomfortable situation with the admiral, Lieutenant O'Hare became more vigilant and required Marlett to have future storyboards meet his approval before turning the sketches into original artwork.

Ron Marlett was honorably discharged from active service on February 9, 1974. The day before Ron's discharge, Lieutenant O'Hare planned a surprise lunch for him that included all the 14th Coast Guard unit commanders and civilian employees. During the luncheon, Ron was presented with the Coast Guard Good Conduct Medal and a plaque that recognized his creative talent in drawing the Ensign Bafflestir cartoons. Lieutenant O'Hare became the conservator to all the Ensign Bafflestir originals and had each cartoon strip framed. Before O'Hare was transferred to Washington DC, he successfully shipped the framed cartoons to other district offices as a way of preserving the history of an unorthodox approach to Coast Guard morale in the early 1970s.

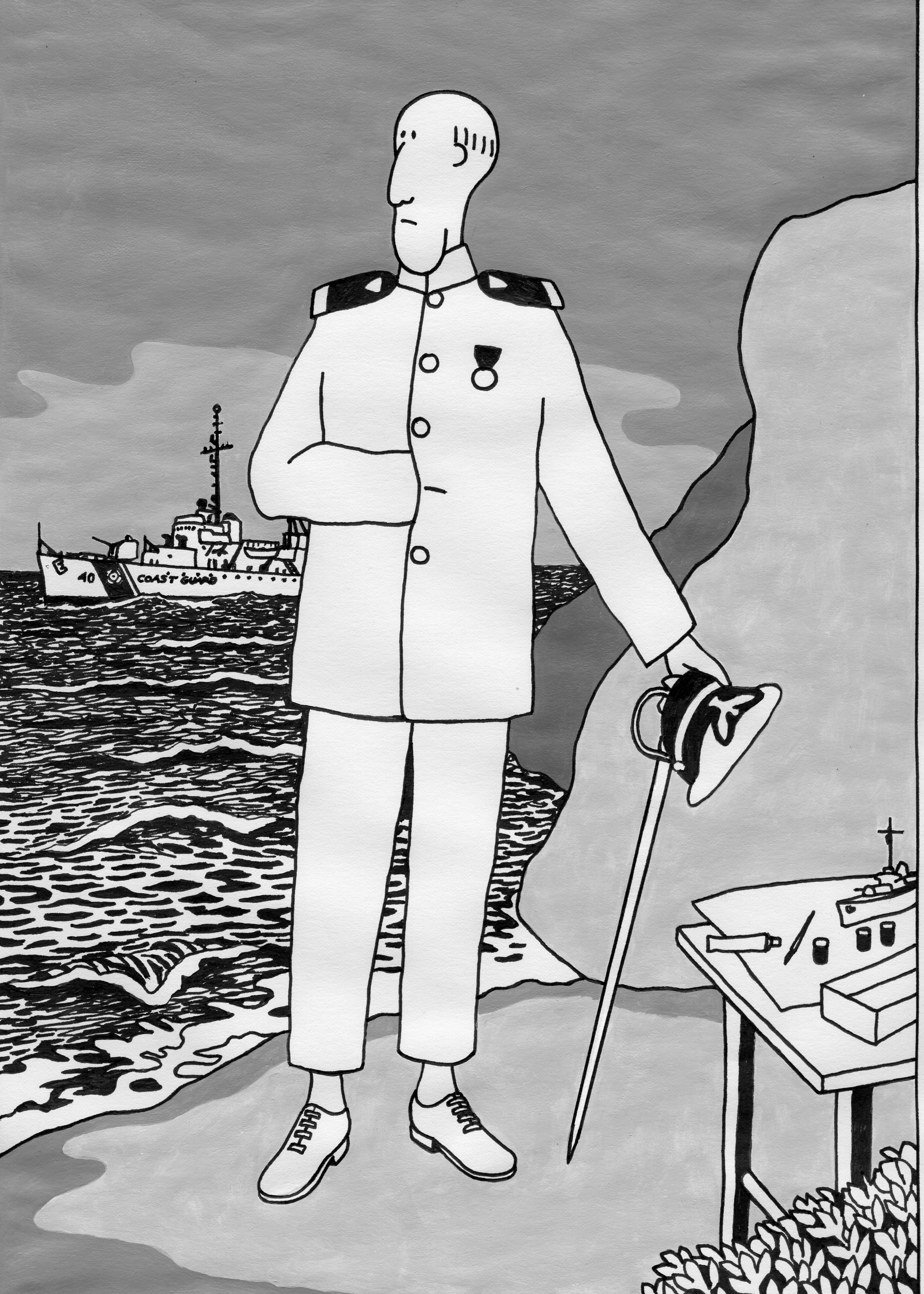
Ensign Bafflestir

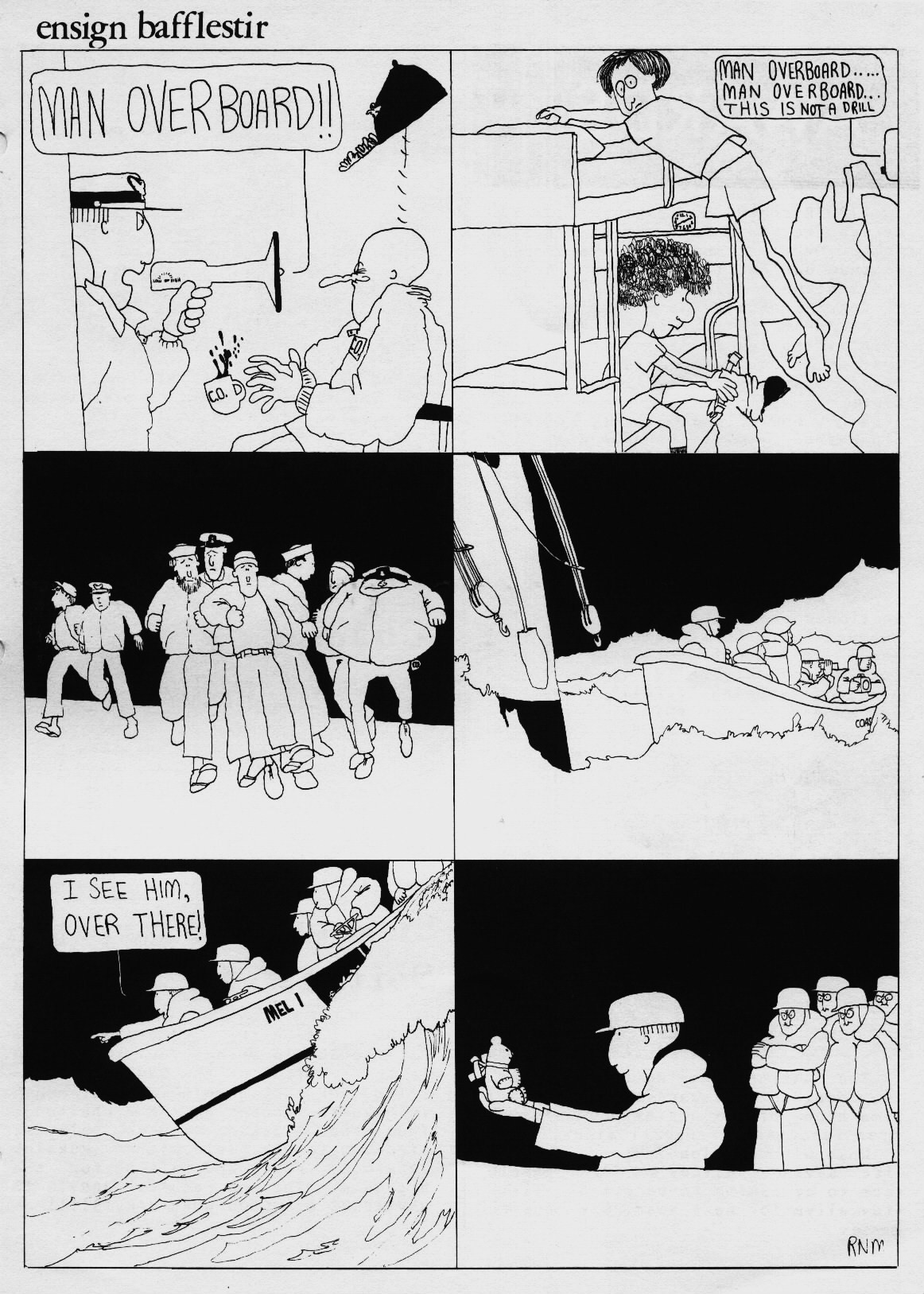
Example of the 6-panel full page strip that Marlett created.

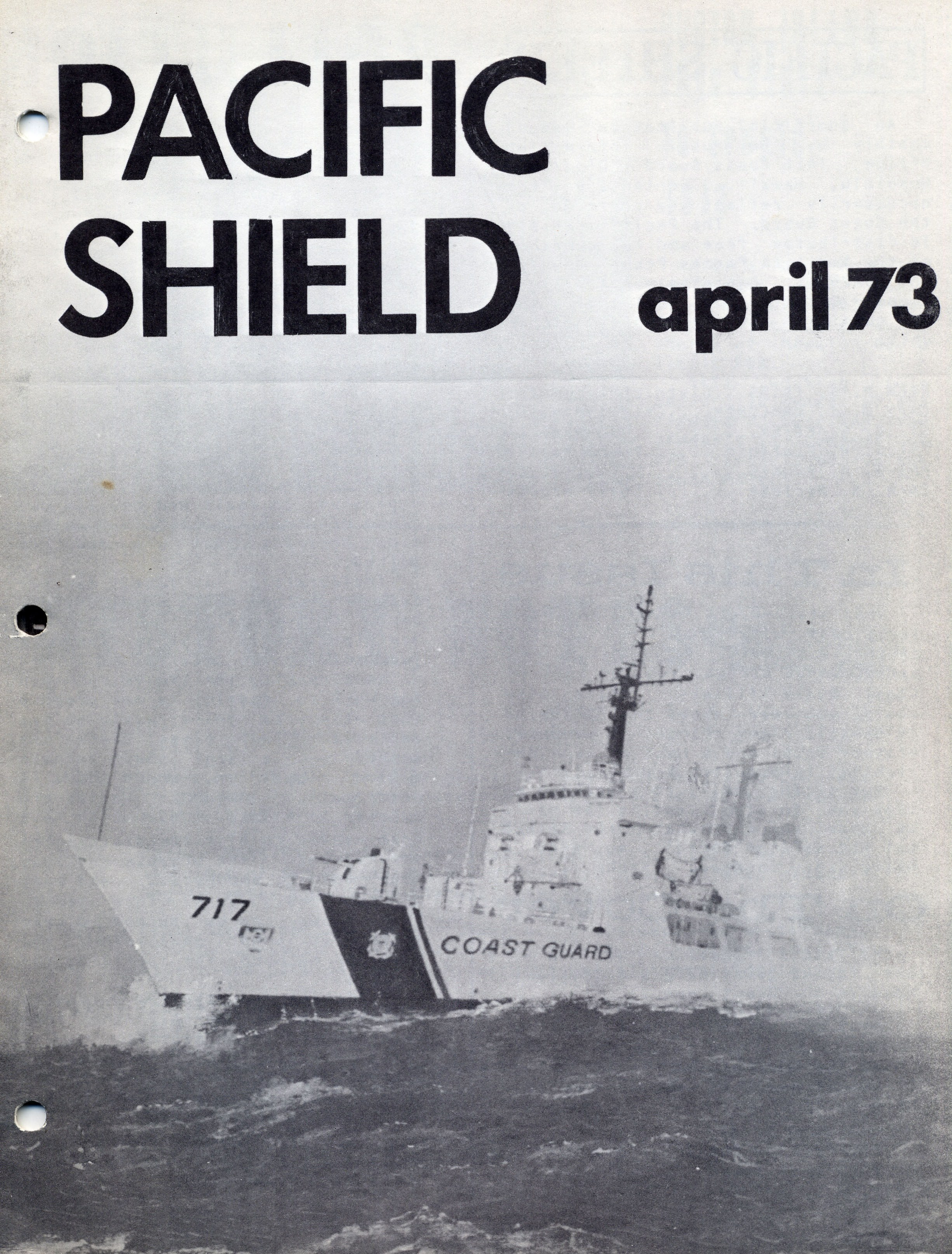
Marlett's cover design that included one of his paintings.

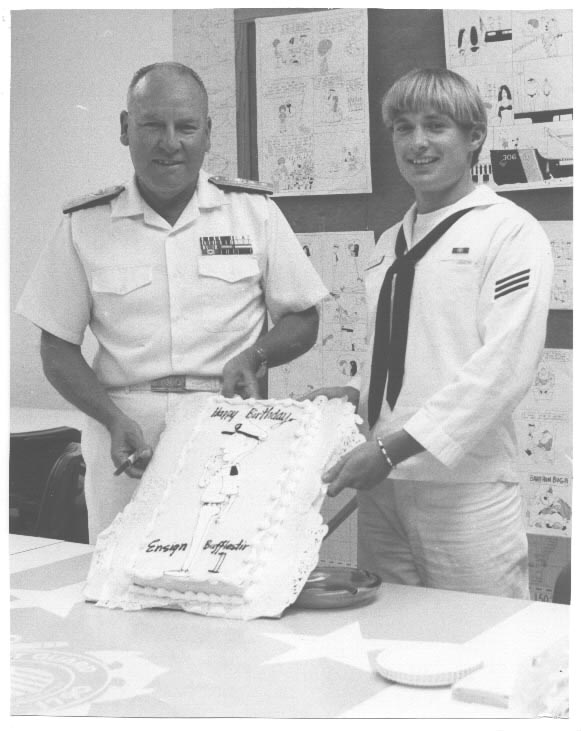
Adm Prins and SN Marlett celebrating one year of Bafflestir publications.

Final panel to one of Marlett's Ensign Bafflestir cartoons
