= Sean Leahy =

Australian cartoonist

Sean Leahy is an Australian cartoonist working for the Courier Mail in Brisbane, Australia. He draws political cartoons for the paper, and also his own comic strip, Beyond the Black Stump, which is distributed in Australia.

== Background ==
In 1974, Sean Leahy began his cartooning career on the suburban weekly The Darling Advertiser while still in high school. One year later, his cartoons became a twice weekly feature of The West Australian, making him, at 17, the youngest political cartoonist in Australia at a metropolitan daily.

Leahy was awarded a QE II Jubilee Trust Award to study animation in the United States in 1982. When he was there, he spent time at Mike Jones Film Corporation in Minneapolis before returning to Perth.

In 1983, he left The West Australian and joined The Daily Sun, then in 1985 The Courier-Mail in Brisbane.

== Beyond The Black Stump ==
Beginning in 1988, Leahy started the nationally syndicated comic strip Beyond The Black Stump, which he writes and draws.

In 2003, Beyond the Black Stump won both the Stanley Award for Australia's Comic Strip Cartoonist of the Year and the Australia's Comic Strip of the Year at the Rotary National Cartoon Awards.

== Achievements ==
From 1993 to 1994, he was a regular cartoonist for the Australian edition of Time magazine. His work has also been featured in The Australian and The Bulletin magazine.

Leahy's cartoons continue to appear in more than 150 publications throughout the world via Cartoon Arts International in New York. Major papers such as The Times and The International Herald-Tribune have printed his work.

Leahy travelled to the US and UK in 2004 for further study in animation as a recipient of a Churchill Fellowship.

Originals of his cartoons are included in private collections ranging from Steven Spielberg to the Vatican.
