= Beyond the Black Stump (comic strip) =

Australian comic strip

Beyond the Black Stump is an Australian comic strip written by Sean Leahy. It debuted in 1988 and won the "Best Comic Strip" at the 2003 National Coffs Harbour Cartoon Awards and the "Comic Strip Cartoonist of the Year" at the Australian Cartoonist's Association's Stanley Award the same year.

The strip follows a cast of Australian wildlife who deal with the day-to-day stresses of marriage, parenting and friendship.

== Characters ==
- Floyd is a wannabe rock 'n' roller echidna. He spends a lot of his time, and a lot of his out of tune music, to protest against whatever comes up, whether it be saving the environment, or saving the echidnas.
- Dave the kangaroo is an original larrikin and party animal. He's always a jump ahead of the rest ... but with his feet that's easy.
- Benny is a kookaburra and a single parent to Spud. He devotes a lot of time to raising Spud properly, but with limited success. Being a solo parent is never an easy job.
- Spud, a bird, is a smart and quick-witted boy, but his grades do not show this trait. It sometimes seems that he tries to make his father's life a misery.
- Sinker is a pelican of many hats...barman, shop-keeper, waiter...he's in any opportunity that pays.
- Boss the galah is every employee's nightmare– Mr Hyde one minute and Mr Hyde the next!
- Frank is a clumsy emu, both muddled and befuddled. He can't fly, but is always trying.
- Fish, the mixed-up marsupial, is a platypus who enjoys the odd drink... the odder the better.
- Bruce is a lazy koala and the only married male in the strip. Despite this fact, he also seems to be the least committed of the cast.
- Katy, a koala, is the dynamic and independent career woman; her sole handicap is her husband.
- Clive is a wombat who thinks a T–shirt is a fashion statement no matter what's printed on it. A fellow who is obviously a few sheep short in the top paddock.
