= Cecil C. Addle =

American comic strip by Ray Collins

Cecil C. Addle, later known as Cecil & Dipstick, was a comic strip drawn by Ray Collins that appeared in the Seattle Post Intelligencer from 1975 to 1979. The main character, Cecil, was apparently a retired or unemployed person who spent his days on the beach near Seattle, talking with his friend, a duck named "Dipstick". The characters in the comic often discussed political and environmental issues.

After Collins moved to Las Vegas, he drew the comic for a local weekly paper until 1997.

== Publications ==
- Ray Collins. Dipstick & friends: With quotes from her royal guver-nuss. Working Press (1977).
- Ray Collins. Everything's great in '78: Further adventures of Cecil C. Addle and Dipstick. Madrona Publishers (1978). ISBN 0-914842-30-7
