= Charles Boyce =

American cartoonist

- Born: Charles Boyce; September 21, 1949 (age 76)
- Occupation: Syndicated Cartoonist
- Years active: 1994–present
- Notable work: Compu-toon
- Website: www.gocomics.com/compu-toon

Charles Boyce (born 1949 in Olive Branch, Mississippi), is an American cartoonist known for his syndicated comic panel Compu-toon. Boyce is also known for creating the KeyPad Kid, a cartoon character used in public affairs awareness programs for training within the telecommunication industry.

== Biography ==
Boyce attended the Memphis Academy of Arts in the 1960s, and in 1969 enlisted in the United States Navy.

The Compu-toon strip ran in approximately 150 newspapers from 1994 until 1997. Boyce is still producing Compu-toon by way of syndication. Andrews McMeel Syndication distributes it. Boyce resides in the northwest suburbs of Chicago.

== Career ==
=== The cARToon Exhibit ===
Boyce was a part of the cARToon exhibit at the Barrington Area Library in January 2007. The show featured a collection of artwork titled the Blues Arrangement Exhibit. According to Boyce, the artwork showed scenes about the blues in Memphis from the early turn of the century to now by "way of events which he had seen or heard of", and contained portraits of blues musicians in various paintings such as Lead Belly, Harmonica Player, Ducks 1, and Ducks 2.

=== Diversity and lack thereof in syndicated cartoons ===
Although there was and still is a lack of diversity within cartoons, there was an increase in cartoonists of color between the years of 1988-1998. In 1988, there was only one cartoonist of color at a large syndicate; Wee Pals creator Morrie Turner. There are several potential causes to this seemingly sudden increase, such as the Free Press and The Detroit News hosting a contest for minority cartoonists as well as there being more focused press space on the issue of diversity. However, despite the increased attention and focus on improving diversity, many minority comic artists have still been rejected from major newspapers based on the fact that the newspaper "already has a minority comic", including comic artists Barbara Brandon and Rey Billingsley. On this topic, Boyce comments that “people are people” and that race has little effect on the enjoyment of a comic; that minority created comics have wide appeal. This is proved by the fact that many cartoonists of color receive fan mail from white readers, as well as the fact that nearly every minority-created comic has continued through 1988-1998, which was an especially impressive rate for the decade.

=== Protesting through artwork ===
In February 2008, Boyce was involved in a protest which called for a greater representation of black cartoon artists in newspaper comics. The protest sought to bring attention to the problem of "tokenism" in newspapers, and brings to light the issues that many black comic artists face when trying to publish their works. In addition to Boyce, the artists who participated in the protest were Jerry Craft, Charlos Gary, Steve Watkins, Keith Knight, Bill Murray, and Tim Jackson. For one day, these cartoonists all drew a very similar comic strip, which showed a scene with a white reader looking at a minority-drawn strip and complaining that it is a rip-off of the Boondocks.
