= Hugh McClelland (cartoonist) =

Cartoonist

Hugh McClelland's Beelzebub Jones (1937)

Hugh McClelland was a cartoonist who headed the cartoon department of the Daily Mirror in the UK.

In 1937, he introduced his wild Western comic strip Beelzebub Jones in the pages of the Daily Mirror. After taking over as cartoon chief at the Mirror in 1945, he dropped Beelzebub Jones and moved on to a variety of new strips, including Dan Doofer, Sunshine Falls and Jimpy.

== Drawing for Sketch ==
In 1952, he exited the Mirror for the tabloid Daily Sketch. He drew Pip Squeak and Wilfred until 1956 when he left Selsey and emigrated with his family to Canada. He launched his last strip, Jimmy Gimmicks, in 1957, but it lasted only two months.

McClelland had a working method that expedited his production. He would pencil 20 weeks of strips at one session, writing dialogue as he progressed and then ink these in outline. Lastly, he would go back and fill in the blacks.
