= Bud Blake =

American cartoonist (1918–2005)

- Born: Julian W. Blake; February 13, 1918 Nutley, New Jersey, U.S.
- Died: December 26, 2005 (aged 87) Portland, Maine, U.S.
- Area: Cartoonist
- Notable works: Tiger

self drawing.

Julian W. Blake (February 13, 1918 – December 26, 2005) was an American cartoonist who created the popular, long-running comic strip Tiger, about a group of suburban boyhood pals. Distributed by King Features Syndicate, Tiger began May 3, 1965. At its peak, it was published internationally in some 400 newspapers.

== Biography ==
Bud Blake's Tiger (August 21, 2001)

Blake was born and raised in Nutley, New Jersey. His father, George Blake, was art director of the Batten Co., a forerunner of Batten, Barton, Durstine & Osborn. Bud's sister became an illustrator for children's books. Dropping out of high school before his graduation, Blake worked as a demonstrator for a pen-knife company, carving portraits from balsa wood. After selling cartoons to Judge magazine, Blake enrolled in New York's National Academy of Design, supporting himself with odd jobs until 1937, when he landed a paste-up position with the Kudner Advertising Agency. He stayed there until 1954, except for his World War II military service with the U.S. Army infantry. After his return, he eventually rose to become an executive art director with Kudner.

Tired of the traveling and heavy responsibility that his job entailed, Blake left advertising to pursue cartooning. He told an interviewer, "Kudner was very good to me. I wasn’t mad at them. They couldn’t believe that I was quitting. I can’t give you the details, but they offered me a hell of a lot of money." King Features was looking for a cartoonist to do a cartoon similar to H. T. Webster's panel series, as Webster had recently died. Blake was hired to draw this series, which ran from 1954 to 1965 under a variety of titles ("Home Sweet Home," "Growing Pains," "Ever Happen to You?'").

Bud Blake and his family spent three months living in Spain, where he drew his new feature, but the international mails proved so unreliable that he eventually returned to the States. Many of his originals had gotten lost in the mail. Blake's clients would eventually include advertising firms and such magazines as Business Week and Family Circle. He drew "Ever Happen to You?" until 1964. He was approached by King Features to create a comic strip that would rival Peanuts, and Tiger was born on May 3, 1965.

Blake drew the strip until he was 85, two years before his death. After Blake retired, the strip continued to appear as reprints, and as of December 2005, according to the syndicate, Tiger was running in more than 100 newspapers in 11 countries.

Widowed in 1988, Blake spent his final years at Damariscotta, Maine. He died at the Maine Medical Center in Portland, Maine.

== Awards ==
The National Cartoonists Society named Tiger the Best Humor Strip in 1970 and 1978. It won the society's Best Newspaper Strip award in 2000, receiving another nomination in 1998.
