= Everyday People Cartoons =

Weekly cartoon

- Author(s): Cathy Thorne
- Website: http://everydaypeoplecartoons.com
- Current status/schedule: Running
- Launch date: 1999
- Genre(s): Humor

Everyday People is a cartoon written and drawn by Cathy Thorne. The cartoon generally uses a single captioned panel featuring a female protagonist. The series debuted in 1999, and has been in continuous production ever since, publishing a new cartoon on a weekly schedule. There are currently over 600 different cartoons on the website covering topics such as motherhood, relationships, health, beauty and well-being.

== Books ==
- Cartoons About Women (and the people who love and annoy them), 2009 ISBN 978-0-9812661-0-7
- Cookie In The Moment, 2012 ISBN 978-0-9812661-1-4

== Other media ==
=== Newspaper ===
Individual cartoons have been syndicated in various international papers, including:

- Toronto Star (Ontario, Canada)
- Sunday Herald Sun (Melbourne, Australia)
- Richmond Times-Dispatch (Virginia, USA)
- The Press (Christchurch, New Zealand)
- Ventura County Star (California, USA)
- Sunday Telegraph (Sydney, Australia)
- Kansas City Star (Kansas, USA)

=== Magazines ===
Individual cartoons have appeared in various magazines, including:

- Good Housekeeping
- More Magazine
- Reader's Digest

=== Websites ===
Individual cartoons have appeared on various websites, including:

- www.massmoms.com
- www.savvymom.ca

=== Newsletters ===
- Johnson and Johnson's babycenter.com's Pregnancy newsletter
- Johnson and Johnson's babycenter.com's BabyStages newsletter

== Awards ==
- Cathy Thorne's Everyday People blog placed 2nd in the Comics category of the 2010 Canadian Weblog Awards.
- In 2010, Reader's Digest selected Cathy Thorne as one of five talented cartoonists from across Canada to watch."
