= Walter R. Allman =

American cartoonist

Walter Rease Allman
- Born: February 27, 1884; United States
- Died: July 8, 1924 (aged 40); Cleveland, Ohio
- Occupation: cartoonist
- Known for: creator of The Doings of the Duffs

Walter Rease Allman (February 27, 1884 – July 8, 1924) was an American cartoonist who created the newspaper gag comic The Doings of the Duffs. The strip was launched on July 30, 1914. Allman's last strip was dated January 16, 1924, but the strip returned in 1925 under other artists until August 15, 1931.

== Biography ==
Walter Allman worked in the grain business at a young age, but didn't have much interest in the trade, spending his time drawing on the sides of boxes and crates. His talent soon landed a job at an engraving company; he later found employment with the Toledo News-Bee newspaper.

His cartoon "work was picked up by the Scripps syndicate NEA Service and his comic Doings of the Duffs became a nationwide feature". An example of his work with the Toledo paper can be seen in 1912, honoring victims of the Titanic disaster.

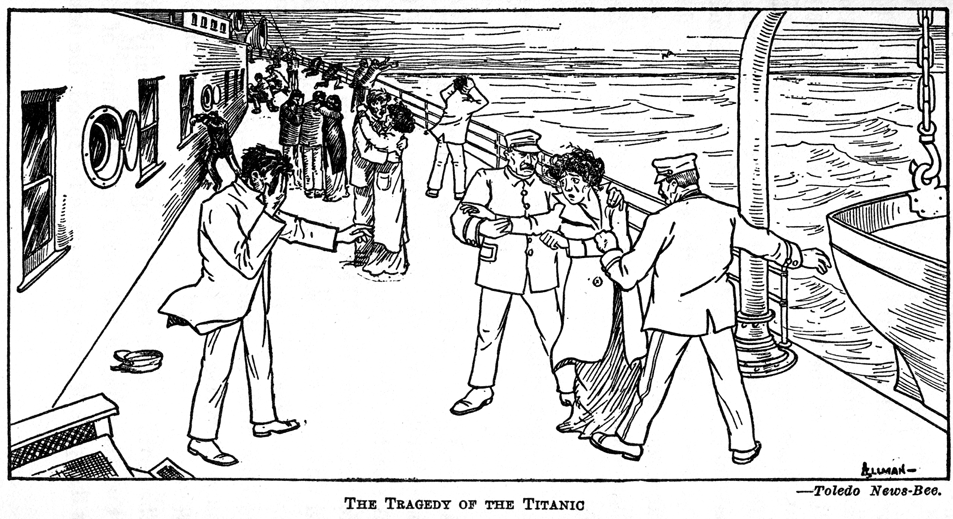
An Allman cartoon about the Titanic disaster from the Toledo Bee

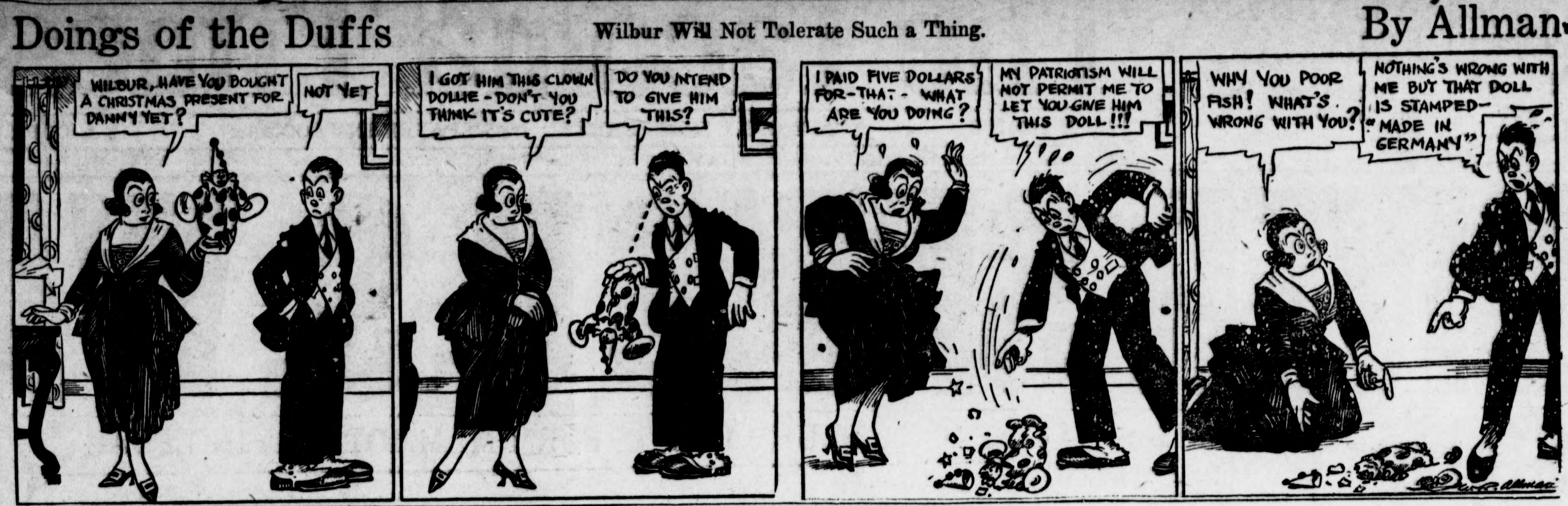
The Doings of the Duffs cartoon, sample from 1917

His The Doings of the Duffs comic strip gained a similar level of fame with the public as the Mutt and Jeff strip had. In 1917, Rembrandt Studios produced a The Doing of the Duffs film. A stage musical followed in 1920.

Allman was a cartoonist from 1915 to 1924. He died in Cleveland on July 8, 1924 at age 42 after suffering a nervous breakdown in 1923.
