= Chicken Wings (comic) =

Aviation comic by Michael and Stefan Strasser

Chicken Wings Aviation Comic
- Author(s): Michael and Stefan Strasser
- Website: www.chickenwingscomics.com
- Current status/schedule: Semi-Inactive: Updates sporadically
- Launch date: September 5, 2004
- Genre(s): Aviation, Comedy

Chicken Wings is an aviation-related comic series that is published as a webcomic as well as a regular comic strip in various aviation magazines around the world. It was created by brothers Michael Strasser and Stefan Strasser in late 2001. Since 2004 a weekly strip is being published regularly on their website. As of 2025, the comic has deviated from its normal weekly schedule and has only been updated periodically.

The comic is especially popular among people who have some relation with or affinity to this particular industry, from pilots over airline personnel to modelers or flight simmers. As the artists try to appeal to this niche market of aviation fans, a few of the jokes are hard to understand or simply not funny for outsiders.

== The creators ==
Michael Strasser is a helicopter pilot and flight instructor who lives and works in California. His brother Stefan Strasser is a cartoonist and illustrator who lives in Vienna.

== Chicken Wings in print ==
So far the Strasser brothers published three books with their collected material. The first book was first published by Infinity Publishing. Later on the brothers decided to re-print and publish it by themselves, successfully selling it through pilot shops around the world and through their own webshop. Chicken Wings – The First Book (ISBN 1-59975-787-7) and Chicken Wings 2 – Full Throttle (ISBN 1-4243-1029-6). Chicken Wings strips and cartoons are published regularly in the following magazines: Trade-A-Plane (USA), EAA Sport Aviation Magazine (USA), Americas Flyways (USA), Atlantic Flyer (USA), Pilot Magazine (UK), Siivet (Finland), Flynytt (Norway), Take-Off (Portugal), Aeromarkt (Germany), Fliegermagazin (Germany) and JP4 (Italy). An Italian edition of the first three books is also available.

== Bibliography ==
- Strasser, Michael and Stefan (2005). Chicken Wings - The First Book. Infinity Publishing and Colorfool Design. ISBN 1-59975-787-7.
- Strasser, Michael and Stefan (2006). Chicken Wings 2 - Full Throttle. Michael and Stefan Strasser. ISBN 1-4243-1029-6.
- Strasser, Michael and Stefan (2008). Chicken Wings 3 - Think Big. Michael and Stefan Strasser. ISBN 978-1-60702-858-1.
- Strasser, Michael e Stefan (2014). Chicken Wings 1 - Il primo libro. LoGisma editore. ISBN 978-88-97530-39-8.
- Strasser, Michael e Stefan (2014). Chicken Wings 2 - A tutto gas. LoGisma editore. ISBN 978-88-97530-50-3.
- Strasser, Michael e Stefan (2018). Chicken Wings 3 - Pensa in grande. LoGisma editore. ISBN 978-88-94926-12-5.
