= Bill Murray (cartoonist) =

American cartoonist (born 1955)

- Born: 1955 (age 70–71); Chicago, Illinois, U.S.
- Education: Art Institute of Chicago (BFA)
- Occupation: Cartoonist

Bill Murray (born 1955 in Chicago, Illinois) is an American cartoonist. He became the seventh African-American artist to be nationally syndicated in 2005. Murray is known for his comics, Jet News and The Golden Years.

== Early life and education ==
Bill Murray was born in Chicago, Illinois in 1955. He wanted to be a cartoonist from an early age, and, by fifth grade, he had won an award for designing citywide cleanup posters.

Bill Murray obtained a bachelor of fine arts degree in visual communications from the Art institute of Chicago. After graduating, he secured an apprenticeship under Herbert Temple at Johnson Publishing Company, which publishes Ebony and Jet magazines.

== Career ==
His first syndicated cartoon was "Those Browns", which was distributed by Sammy Davis Jr. Enterprises. Since 1981, he has worked for the Pittsburgh Courier and the Chicago Defender drawing the "Sonny Boy" comic strips.

In 1985 Murray created BAM Productions, a comic book company, and hired comic book artists Jerry Ordway, Ben Dunn, and Kevin Eastman (co-creator of the Teenage Mutant Ninja Turtles) to create the art for his comic books, Adam & Eve A.D., a series of comic books.

In 2005, Bill Murray became the seventh African-American to be nationally syndicated.

Murray currently resides in Pennsylvania, where he writes a comic strip for the Real Times Media, Inc. The Detroit-based company owns a chain of six African-American newspapers, which includes The Chicago Defender and Pittsburgh Courier. Murray has been employed by the company since 1981, drawing a comic strip entitled Sonny Boy.

Murray's freelance editorial cartoons have appeared on CNN, FOX, USA TODAY, and he is represented by CSL Limited, which distributes his cartoons and illustrations around the world.

Murray is also a published children's book illustrator, with a series of books being published in July 2010.
