= Compu-toon =

American comic strip by Charles Boyce

- Author(s): Charles Boyce
- Current status/schedule: Current gag panel
- Launch date: 1994; 31 years ago
- Syndicate(s): Tribune Media Services (1994–1997); Andrews McMeel Publishing/GoComics (2001–present)
- Genre(s): Humor, computers

Compu-toon is a comic strip by Charles Boyce.

Compu-toon was launched in 1994 through Tribune Media Services. At its height, the comic strip ran in about 150 newspapers worldwide from 1994 to 1997 in print form. Since April 23, 2001, it has appeared online via Ucomics/GoComics.

== Format ==
Compu-toon comics consist of a single panel and have a surrealist quality about them that has been described as "baffling and not exactly funny but the cartoonist seems too sincere about his mission to really mock". Strips usually contain a normal situation with a non sequitur that is tangentially related to computers or technology.
