= Brainwaves (comic strip) =

Cartoon series by Betsy Streeter

Brainwaves is a single-panel cartoon series by Betsy Streeter. Brainwaves has been described as "a single-panel stream of consciousness about the infinite absurdity of everyday life."

Brainwaves began in 1993 as single cartoons published by King Features Syndicate through their feature, The New Breed. After that, Brainwaves began to appear in numerous books and periodicals, including the Newport News Daily Press. For a time Brainwaves was syndicated online by the Universal Press Syndicate on its GoComics site. Many Brainwaves cartoons are currently available through the agency CartoonStock.com (located in the United Kingdom).

There are two Brainwaves book collections: Brainwaves: The First Wave (Drooly Dog Features, 2005) and Brainwaves While U Wait (Drooly Dog Features, 2006).

Streeter, who hails from Northern California, is a regular contributor to the Funny Times.
