= Festival of Cartoon Art =

Defunct triennial conference on the art of comics

- Status: Defunct; succeeded by Cartoon Crossroads Columbus
- Genre: Comic strips, Political cartoons, Comic books, Comics studies
- Frequency: Triannual
- Venue: Ohio State University
- Location: Columbus, Ohio
- Country: U.S.
- Inaugurated: October 14, 1986; 40 years ago at Ohio State University
- Founder: Lucy Shelton Caswell
- Most recent: Nov. 14–17, 2013
- Filing status: Educational/Nonprofit
- Sponsor: Billy Ireland Cartoon Library & Museum
- Website: cartoons.osu.edu/events/festival-of-cartoon-art/

The Festival of Cartoon Art was a triennial conference on the art of comics held at Ohio State University from 1983 to 2013. The conference was produced by what is now known as the Billy Ireland Cartoon Library & Museum.

Featuring two to three days of lectures, panel discussions, exhibitions, and receptions, the Festival attracted cartoonists, comics scholars, fans, collectors, and students. Leading cartoonists spoke at the festival, including Lynda Barry, Milton Caniff, Will Eisner, Jules Feiffer, Ben Katchor, Patrick Oliphant, Jeff Smith, Art Spiegelman, Garry Trudeau, and Bill Watterson. Exhibitions were generally shown at what is now known as the Billy Ireland Cartoon Library & Museum as well as other venues around Columbus, Ohio.

== History ==
The inaugural Festival was held on October 14, 1983, and was augmented by three related exhibitions organized by Lucy Shelton Caswell of the school's Library for Communication and Graphic Arts.

In late 1994, Universal Press Syndicate donated $50,000 to underwrite the 1995 Festival of Cartoon Art, which was dedicated to celebrating the centennial of the American comic strip. The featured exhibition was "See You in the Funny Papers: American Life as Reflected in the Newspaper Comic Strip," curated by Caswell.

The theme of the 2001 festival was "Historic Virtuoso Cartoonists": an exhibit of the same name was shown Aug. 26-Sept. 30 at the Columbus Recreation and Parks Department Cultural Arts Center; and the exhibit "Calvin and Hobbes, Sunday Pages 1985-1995" was shown at OSU's Cartoon Research Library Reading Room Gallery.

The theme of the 2004 festival was "Deletions, Omissions and Erasures". The theme of the 2007 festival was "Graphic Storytelling" — exhibitions associated with the festival celebrated the centennial of Milton Caniff's birth.

The 2010 Festival featured a one-day symposium titled Humor, Play and Identity in Comics: Academic Perspectives. In addition to the usual panels and presentations, Art Spiegelman gave a presentation as part of his residency at OSU's Wexner Center for the Arts. Other events included a tribute to Jay Kennedy, the late editor-in-chief of King Features Syndicate (who had bequeathed his collection of underground comix to OSU's Cartoon Library & Museum); and celebrations of the 100th anniversary of George Herriman's Krazy Kat.

The final Festival, held mid-November 2013, was titled "Grand Opening Festival of Cartoon Art," as it celebrated the opening of the Billy Ireland Cartoon Library & Museum's new home in the renovated Sullivant Hall. Exhibitions on view during the festival were "Treasures from the Collections of the Billy Ireland Cartoon Library & Museum" and "Substance and Shadow: The Art of the Cartoon".

=== Later developments ===
In mid-November 2014, the International Comic Arts Forum (ICAF) held its (mostly yearly) conference at OSU's Billy Ireland Cartoon Library & Museum. The Comics Studies Society, the first U.S. association dedicated to supporting the study of graphic narrative and sequential art, was launched at that year's ICAF. Guests and speakers included John Lewis, Andrew Aydin, Nate Powell, Phoebe Gloeckner, Hanneriina Moisseinen, Jeff Smith, Justin Green, Carol Tyler, Dash Shaw, and Tom Spurgeon.

The Festival of Cartoon Art was succeeded in 2015 by the annual comics festival Cartoon Crossroads Columbus.

=== Event history ===
Dates	Forum Venue	Featured Speakers
Oct. 14, 1983	Ohio State University; Columbus, Ohio	Mike Peters, Mort Walker, Bill Yates, Tony Auth, Tom Batiuk, Milton Caniff, Luke Feck, Jules Feiffer, Cathy Guisewite, Irwin Hasen, Draper Hill, Etta Hulme, Bil Keane, Fred Lasswell, Toni Mendez, Kate Palmer, Art Sansom
Oct. 17–19, 1986	Sullivant Hall Theatre, Ohio State University; Columbus, Ohio	Brian Basset, Jim Davis, Jim Berry, Will Eisner, Selby Kelly, David Hendin, Dick Locher, Nicole Hollander, M.G. Lord, Roy Peterson, Doug Marlette, Sam Rawls, Arnold Schwartzman, Jerry Robinson, Morrie Turner, Michelle Urry, Signe Wilkinson
Oct. 27–29, 1989	Ohio State University; Columbus, Ohio	Sergio Aragonés, Tom Batiuk, John Berton, Bo Brown, Buck Brown, Sandy Campbell, Tee Collins, Will Eisner, Draper Hill, Etta Hulme, Lynn Johnston, John Lasseter, Tim Menees, David Wiley Miller, Richard S. Newcombe, Judith O'Sullivan, Mike Peters, Arnold Roth, Lee Salem, Jeff Stahler, Mark Alan Stamaty, Ed Stein, Don Stredney, Dana Summers, Robert W. Wagner, Mort Walker, Bill Watterson, Chris Wedge, Richard Samuel West
Oct. 30–31, 1992	Ohio State University; Columbus, Ohio	Mell Lazarus, David Hendin, Jim Borgman, Mort Drucker, Nicole Hollander, Mike Konopacki, Buck Brown, Lee Lorenz
Aug. 25–26, 1995	Conference Theatre, Ohio Union, Ohio State University; Columbus, Ohio	Garry Trudeau, Jeff MacNelly, Lynn Johnston, Bill Amend, Robb Armstrong, Stephen Bentley, Bruce Beattie, Bill Griffith
Oct. 9–10, 1998	Conference Theatre, Ohio Union, Ohio State University; Columbus, Ohio	Steve Benson, Brumsic Brandon Jr., Mark J. Cohen, Dave Coverly, Will Eisner, R. C. Harvey, Patrick McDonnell, Jack Ohman, Joel Pett, Victoria Roberts, Ted Rall, Jeff Smith, Art Spiegelman, Bob Thaves
Sept. 28–29, 2001	Conference Theatre, Ohio Union, Ohio State University; Columbus, Ohio	Sergio Aragonés, Jim Borgman, Lynda Barry, Eldon Dedini, Lynn Johnston, Will Eisner, Ben Katchor, David Levine, Rick Kirkman, Patrick McDonnell, Lee Lorenz, Pat Oliphant, Trina Robbins, Roy Peterson, Jerry Scott, Jeff Smith, Rebecca Zurier
Oct. 15–16, 2004	The Blackwell Hotel; Columbus, Ohio	Lalo Alcaraz, Tom Batiuk, Charles Brownstein, Al Feldstein, Nicole Hollander, Bob Levin, Jay Lynch, Cindy McCreery, Joel Pett, Michael Ramirez, Art Spiegelman, Ann Telnaes, Tom Tomorrow, Michelle Urry
Oct. 25–27, 2007	Columbus Renaissance Hotel; Columbus, Ohio	Jessica Abel, Nick Anderson, Alison Bechdel, Ray Billingsley, Gary Groth, R. C. Harvey, Mike Peters, Paul Pope, Peter Poplaski, Ted Rall, Arnold Roth, P. Craig Russell, David Saylor, Diana Schutz, Frank Stack, Brian Walker, Mort Walker
Oct. 14-17, 2010	Wexner Center for the Arts; Ohio State University; Columbus, Ohio	Steve Breen, Roz Chast, Tony Cochran, Jan Eliot, Matt Groening & Tom Gammill, Dave Kellett, Paul Levitz, Dan Piraro, Jen Sorensen, Art Spiegelman, James Sturm, Gene Luen Yang
Nov. 14–17, 2013	Sullivant Hall, Ohio State University; Columbus, Ohio	Paul Pope, Jeff Smith, the Hernandez brothers, Matt Bors, Eddie Campbell, Stephan Pastis, Brian Basset, Kazu Kibuishi, Art Spiegelman

== Festival exhibitions ==
1983

- "Active cartoonists" (Sept. 26–Nov. 4: Ohio State University Main Library) — Current work by members of the National Cartoonists Society and the Association of American Editorial Cartoonists
- "Comic art prints" (Oct. 10–Oct. 31: Main Library Gallery, Public Library of Columbus and Franklin County) — Set of 20 limited-edition prints owned by the OSU Library for Communication and Graphic Arts
- "Historic cartoons" (Oct. 13–Nov. 4: Hoyt Sherman Gallery, Sullivant Hall) — Historic cartoons from the collections of Phillip Sills and Frank Pauer, the Columbus Museum of Art, and the Ohio Historical Society

1986

- "Cartoons Then" (Sept. 29–Oct. 26: Hoyt L. Sherman Gallery, University Gallery of Fine Art, Sullivant Hall) — Historic collections from the Art Wood Collection
- "Side by Side" (Oct. 1–Oct. 31: Main Library Gallery, Public Library of Columbus and Franklin County) — Original cartoons and film advertising materials from OSU's Library for Communication and Graphics Arts and the Ohio Historical Society
- "Cartoons Now" (Oct. 6—Nov. 21: Main Library Skylight Exhibit Hall) — Work by members of the Association of American Editorial Cartoonists, Cartoonists Association, and the National Cartoonists Society

1989

- "Great American Comics — 100 Years of American Cartoon Art" (Oct. 15–Nov. 26: Columbus Recreation and Parks Department's Cultural Arts Center) — Focusing on comics as a graphic narrative; Smithsonian Institution Traveling Exhibition Service show opens its two-year national tour
- "Women Practitioners of 'The Ungentlemanly Art'" (Oct. 16–Nov. 30: Philip Sills exhibit Hall, OSU Main Library) — The work of seven women political cartoonists: Linda Boileau, Edwina Dumm, Etta Hulme, M.G. Lord, Lillian Mesner, Kate Palmer, and Signe Wilkinson

1992

- "Political Satire by Oliver Harrington" (Sept. 13–Nov. 7: Martin Luther King Jr. Complex for Performing and Cultural Arts) — Examples of Harrington's comic strip character Bootsie, as well as his magazine cartoons
- "'Illusions: Ethnicity in American Cartoon Art" (Oct. 26–Dec. 11: OSU Main Library, Philip Sills Exhibition Hall) — Examination of racial and ethnic stereotypes in cartoons from the past 150 years

1995

- "Anything Can Happen in a Comic Strip: Centennial Reflections on an American Art Form" (July 30–Aug. 27: Columbus Recreation and Parks Department Cultural Arts Center)
- "The Face Behind the Laugh: Cartoonists' Self-Caricatures from the Collections of Mark J. Cohen" (July 30-Aug. 27: Columbus Recreation and Parks Department Cultural Arts Center) — Originally shown at the Cartoon Art Museum (San Francisco) Nov. 25, 1988–Mar. 4, 1989
- "See You in the Funny Papers: American Life as Reflected in the Newspaper Comic Strip" (Aug. 1–Oct. 27: Cartoon, Graphic, and Photographic Arts Research Library — Curated by Lucy Shelton Caswell
- "Sequential Art: The Next Step" (Aug. 24–Oct. 14: Martin Luther King Jr. Complex for Performing and Cultural Arts) — The work of young, mostly African American, cartoonists Darrell Gates, Grey, Hannibal King, Louis Small, Jr., Jeff Smith, and Robert Stull; curated by Stull. Later traveled to the National Center of Afro-American Artists in Boston; the Words & Pictures Museum in Northampton, MA; the Afro-American Cultural Center in Charlotte, NC; and the Tubman Museum in Macon, GA.

1998

- "The Genius of Winsor McCay" (Sept. 21-Dec. 30: Cartoon Research Library Reading Room Gallery)
- "Humor in a Jugular Vein: An Expanded Exhibition of the Art, Artists, and Artifacts of MAD Magazine from the Collection of Mark J. Cohen and Rose Marie McDaniel" (Oct. 1–Nov. 13: Columbus College of Art and Design Joseph V. Canzani Center)

2001

- "Historic Virtuoso Cartoonists" (Aug. 26-Sept. 30: Columbus Recreation and Parks Department Cultural Arts Center) — Curated by Lucy Shelton Caswell; featuring Thomas Nast, Joseph Keppler, Frederick Burr Opper, Richard Felton Outcault, Winsor McCay, Nell Brinkley, George Herriman, Edwina Dumm, Rube Goldberg, Milton Caniff, Walt Kelly, Charles M. Schulz, Willard Mullin, James Thurber, Oliver Harrington, Art Young, Jay Norwood Darling, Rollin Kirby, and Jeff MacNelly
- "Calvin and Hobbes, Sunday Pages 1985-1995" (Sept. 10, 2001–Jan. 15, 2002: Cartoon Research Library Reading Room Gallery) — The work of Bill Watterson

2004

- "Gillray's Legacy" (Sept. 15–Dec. 10: Philip Sills Gallery, William Oxley Thompson Library) — Curated by Lucy Shelton Caswell; the art of James Gillray
- "Drawing Fire: Controversial Comics by Milton Caniff" (Oct. 1, 2004–Jan. 14, 2005: Cartoon Research Library reading room gallery)

2007

- "Rarities: Unusual Works from the Caniff Collection" (Sept. 4, 2007–Jan. 19, 2008: Cartoon Research Library)
- "Spotlight on Milton Caniff" (Oct. 23, 2007–Mar. 23, 2008: Ohio Historical Society)

2010

- "Ireland of the Dispatch" (Sept. 7, 2010–Jan 2, 2011: Thompson Library Gallery) — Billy Ireland work for The Columbus Dispatch
- "Scenes of My Infint-hood: Celebrating the Birth of Krazy Kat" (Sept. 7–Dec. 31: Billy Ireland Cartoon Library & Museum Reading Room Gallery) — The work of George Herriman
- "The Bible Illuminated: R. Crumb's Book of Genesis" (Oct. 8, 2010–Jan. 6, 2011: Columbus Museum of Art) — Work from Robert Crumb's The Book of Genesis adaptation

2013

- "Treasures from the Collections of the Billy Ireland Cartoon Library & Museum" (Nov. 14–Nov. 17: Billy Ireland Cartoon Library and Museum Treasures Gallery) — Original artwork for Dick Tracy, Peanuts, Calvin and Hobbes, Bone, and more
- "Substance and Shadow: The Art of the Cartoon" (Nov. 14–Nov. 17: Billy Ireland Cartoon Library and Museum) — "Original art ... which dramatically reveals the various elements, methods, tools and techniques that cartoonists utilize, including caricature, character design, sequential panels, speech balloons, page layout, animation and storytelling."

== See also ==
- International Comic Arts Forum
