= The Sunday Funnies =

American magazine

- Editor: Russ Cochran
- Categories: Comic strips
- Frequency: Monthly
- Publisher: Russ Cochran Publishing
- Founded: 2011
- Country: United States of America
- Language: English

The Sunday Funnies is a publication reprinting vintage Sunday comic strips at a large size (16"x22") in color. The format is similar to that traditionally used by newspapers to publish color comics, yet instead of newsprint, it is printed on a quality, non-glossy, 60-pound offset stock for clarity and longevity. Featured are classic American comic strips from the late 19th century to the 1930s. The publication's title is taken from the generic label ("Sunday funnies") often used for the color comics sections of Sunday newspapers.

== Publisher ==
It was launched December 2011 by editor-publisher Russ Cochran, who was associated with the classic comics reprints of Another Rainbow Publishing, Gladstone Publishing and Gemstone Publishing. Cochran stated, "These are full-size, full-page comics from the greatest years of newspaper comics. Initial print runs will be very small and early issues are likely to sell out."

The source of the strips is the Billy Ireland Cartoon Library & Museum at Ohio State University, which houses Bill Blackbeard's collection of comic strips, the largest and most comprehensive in the world. Design and production is by Michael Kronenberg, who previously designed the EC Archives for Cochran.

== Comic strips ==
The front cover of The Sunday Funnies' first issue features the comic strip Crazy Quilt (April 19, 1914), a collaboration of six different cartoonists: Everett Lowry, Frank King, Quin Hall, Dean Cornwell, Lester J. Ambrose and Charles Lederer.

The Sunday Funnies was originally planned as a 32-page monthly. Budget considerations, however, led Cochran to instead publish it as a 96-page quarterly, divided into three separate 32-page sections. Section one (labeled "Section A") of the first issue features Alley Oop, Bronc Peeler, Crazy Quilt, Gasoline Alley, Krazy Kat and Wee Willie Winkie's World, plus brief notes on the strips by Cochran. Section B features the above strips, plus Dudley Fisher's Right Around Home. Section C introduces George Herriman's Stumble Inn. The daily Gasoline Alley strips of February 14–15, 1921, are added on The Sunday Funnies' editorial page to show the arrival of Skeezix as a newborn baby on the doorstep of Walt Wallet. Also featured in the third section is an essay by Cochran, "The Vanishing Newspaper", decrying libraries' destruction of newspapers once they had been microfilmed and praising Blackbeard's role in comics preservation.

Comic strips announced as forthcoming are Frank King's Bobby Make-Believe, Buck Rogers, Frank Godwin's Connie, Flash Gordon, Billy Ireland's The Passing Show, Polly and Her Pals, Winsor McCay's A Tale of the Jungle Imps by Felix Fiddle and Terry and the Pirates.

== Reaction ==
Captain Comics reviewed the debut issue of The Sunday Funnies:

Gasoline Alley: The current Walt and Skeezix series (volume five of which shipped recently and covers 1929-1930) reprints dailies only. There was a single volume of color Sundays released a couple of years ago, but it is not comprehensive. Frank King is known equally for his innovative Sunday layout and design as he is for his ongoing narrative in which the characters age in real time. The earliest strips are printed in duotone red and white, but full color was added after a while. This is easily my favorite feature. Alley Oop: There isn’t a comprehensive collection of Alley Oop dailies or Sundays. My second favorite feature... Stumble Inn: A thematic precursor to Berke Breathed’s Bloom County (the early days, anyway). Herriman must have been an influence on Breathed, because certain aspects of later Bloom Country, and especially its follow-up, Outland, greatly resembled Krazy Kat... These strips are reprinted in the original size, a Sunday broadsheet. The paper stock is thick, non-glossy and brilliantly white, beautifully showcasing the original colors (as well as the slight yellowing of the source paper)... Editor Russ Cochran also provides his e-mail address for feedback regarding future features.

== See also ==
- Allan Holtz
- Hogan's Alley
- The Menomonee Falls Gazette
- Nemo, the Classic Comics Library
