= The Sunday Funnies (disambiguation) =

The Sunday Funnies is a newspaper-sized anthology published by Russ Cochran, reprinting vintage syndicated Sunday comic strips.

The Sunday Funnies, Sunday Funnies, or Sunday funnies may also refer to:

- Sunday comics, or Sunday funnies, full-color comic strip section carried in most American newspapers
- MeTV's Sunday Funnies, a programming block on TV network MeTV
- Sunday Funnies, Motown artists
- Sunday Funnies, a feature in the TV program This Week
