= Dudley Fisher =

American cartoonist

Dudley Fisher's Right Around Home (February 5, 1939). To read this strip at the proper resolution, go to Animation Resources.

Dudley Tyng Fisher Jr. (April 27, 1890 – July 10, 1951) was a syndicated newspaper cartoonist, best known for his character Myrtle who was introduced in his Sunday page, Right Around Home, distributed by King Features Syndicate under various titles from 1937 to 1964. Fisher drew Right Around Home until his death on October 6, 1951, after which his assistant, Bob Vittur, managed the strip with assistance from King Features’ bullpen stalwart Stan Randal until its end on May 2, 1965.

== Early life ==
Fisher was born in Columbus, Ohio to Dudley T. Fisher Sr. and Marion Garner Fisher and grew up on the city's north side. He was known as Ting by the other children because Dudley was considered too fancy. His first work appeared in the juvenile magazine St. Nicholas. In high school he drew for the school newspaper which was edited by W. M. Kiplinger. As an adult, he studied to be an architect at Ohio State University and was recruited into Sigma Pi fraternity by Kiplinger and Ray Evans. While at OSU, he was an art editor for the MakiO yearbook. At the encouragement of Evans, a cartoonist, he left school after two years to work as a newspaper layout artist at The Columbus Dispatch. He remembered that his first interview with editor Arthur Johnson Sr. was composed of them yelling at each other over the noise of the printing presses.

== Comic strips ==
When hired by the Dispatch in 1911, Fisher was a retouch artist under the direction of Evans and Billy Ireland. He later worked side by side with another famous cartoonist, Milton Caniff. He served in an aerial photography unit in 1917 during World War I. Re-joining the Dispatch after the war, he created the two-color daily panel Jolly Jingles (1924–37).

In 1937, tired of devising the Jolly Jingles rhymes, he created Right Around Home depicting a suburban family. He immediately attracted attention with the experimental concept of an elevated down-angle view showing numerous characters in a large single panel filling an entire Sunday page. He attributed its success and charm of this page to his stumbling "upon the truth that what readers like most is to read about themselves and the things they all do." He confirmed that the characters were all based on people, and animals, that he knew with Myrtle being based on his daughter's mannerisms.

Five years after its first publication, King Features asked Fisher to do a daily version of Right Around Home in a conventional comic strip format, and Myrtle began in 1942.

== Personal life ==
Fisher married Anne Potts on December 31, 1919 and they had a daughter, Marion. In later life, he learned to build and play pipe organs. Friends said he could play very well but he did not think his ability was good enough to play in public

Fisher advised young artists to "put all your energy into what you draw and stop worrying about which pen and paper to use. Make the most of your chances. You' ll never know which were the big chances until long after you try them."

Fisher worked for the Columbus Dispatch and on his two newspaper strips until his death in 1951 while on vacation in Rockport, Massachusetts.

== After his death ==
Bob Vittur stepped in to draw Right Around Home through 1952, when it was retitled Right Around Home with Myrtle. It continued under that title until 1964.

== Reprints ==
Right Around Home was reprinted in the first issue (December 2011) of Russ Cochran's The Sunday Funnies.

== Sources ==
Strickler, Dave. Syndicated Comic Strips and Artists, 1924-1995: The Complete Index. Cambria, California: Comics Access, 1995. ISBN 0-9700077-0-1
