= Right Around Home =

Comic strip by Dudley Fisher

Dudley Fisher's Right Around Home (January 22, 1939)

Right Around Home was a comic strip by Dudley Fisher that was distributed by King Features Syndicate from January 16, 1938 to May 2, 1965.

Fisher drew a suburban setting with a focus on one family in that neighborhood, but what made his Sunday strip unique was the format. He employed an elevated down-angle view showing numerous characters in an immense single panel that completely filled an entire Sunday page. Fisher drew Right Around Home until his death on October 6, 1951, after which his assistant, Bob Vittur, managed the strip with assistance from King Features’ bullpen stalwart Stan Randal until its end on May 2, 1965.

== Characters and story ==
The energetic Myrtle and her parents were central figures in the neighborhood. In 1942, King Features asked Fisher to do a daily version of Right Around Home in a conventional comic strip format, and the daily Myrtle began that year. Comics historian Don Markstein described Fisher's family:

Most pages showed the ensemble cast gathered together for a barbecue, a session of ice skating, or some other event where a lot of little things were going on all at once. But when, a few years later, the syndicate suggested Fisher start a daily version, he decided the smaller format called for a narrower focus. Myrtle, which starred one of the neighborhood kids, began in 1942. Myrtle was a high-spirited girl, not as bratty as Little Iodine or as nice as Little Dot—about on the order of Little Lulu. Her mom and dad, Freddie and Susie in the larger version, were also central players, as were their dog Bingo and her pal Sampson. Other neighbors, including pets, made regular appearances. Even Archie and Alice, a pair of birds that nested in the area and sometimes commented from afar on the Sunday doings, turned up occasionally. Carl Ed (Harold Teen) also got at least partial credit from 1943-51.

After World War II, the Sunday strip was retitled Myrtle—Right Around Home and later Right Around Home with Myrtle (and sometimes simply Myrtle). When Fisher died in 1951, his assistant Bob Vittur drew the strip, which continued until it was dropped in 1964.

== Reprints ==
Right Around Home was reprinted in the first issue (December 2011) of Russ Cochran's The Sunday Funnies.

== Sources ==
- Strickler, Dave. Syndicated Comic Strips and Artists, 1924–1995: The Complete Index. Cambria, California: Comics Access, 1995. ISBN 0-9700077-0-1
