= Kat Fajardo =

American artist (born 1991)

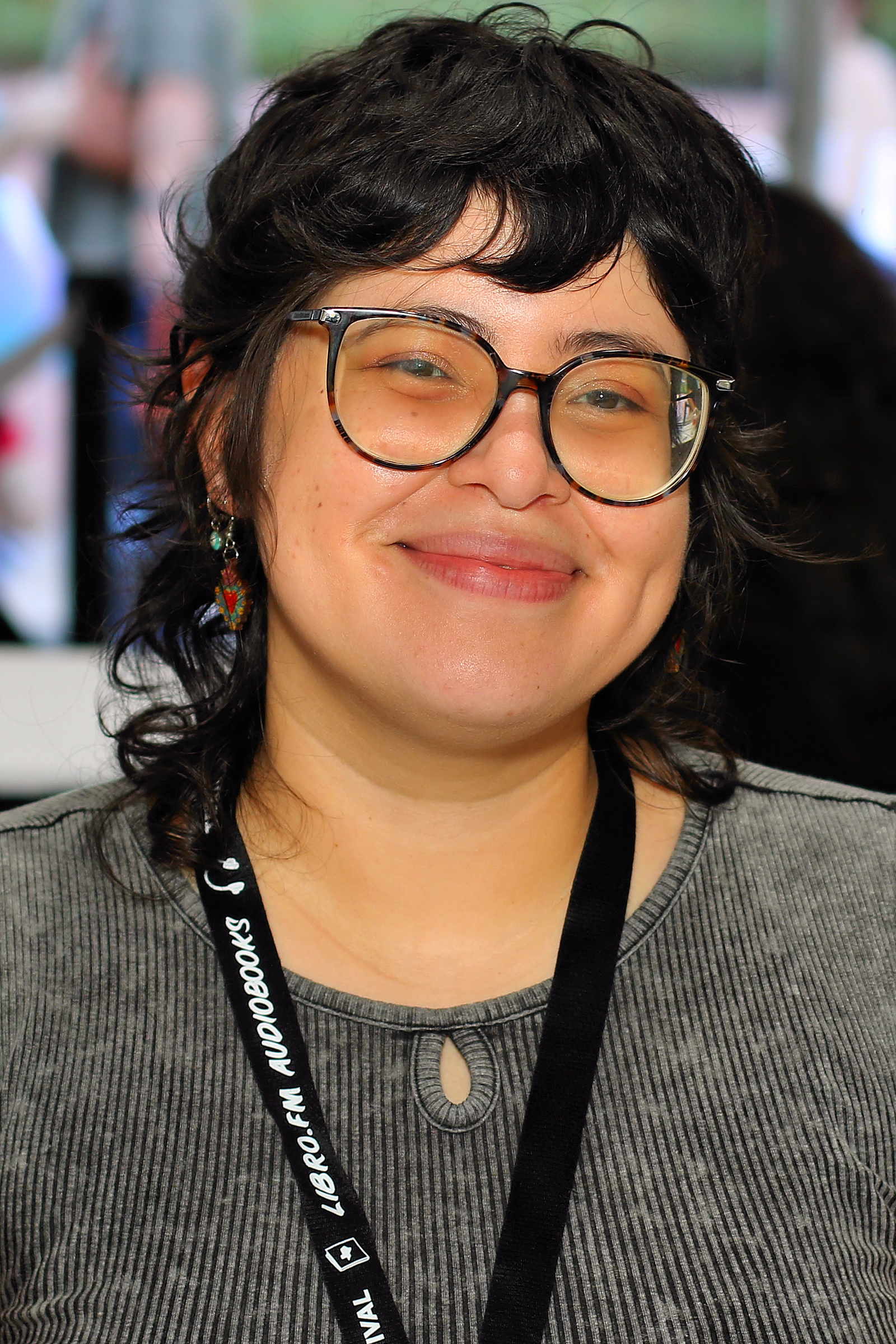
- Fajardo at the 2025 Texas Book Festival.
- Born: New York City, New York, U.S.
- Other name: Katherine Fajardo
- Education: School of Visual Arts, New York City, New York
- Occupations: Freelance Comic Artist and Illustrator

Katherine Fajardo (born January 16, 1991) is an American cartoonist and author. She is known for her book cover illustrations and comics that focus on Latino culture and self-acceptance. Her debut middle grade graphic novel Miss Quinces, which is a National Indie Bestseller, was the first Graphix title to be simultaneously published in English and Spanish (as Srta. Quinces).

== Biography ==
=== Early life ===
Fajardo is a first-generation American Latina born and raised in Loisaida New York City, New York. Her mother and father are both immigrants, from Honduras and Colombia respectively. At an early age, Fajardo was a fan of anime and manga. According to her, Digimon, Dragon ball Z, and Clamp manga series were her early influences. She attended Fiorello H. LaGuardia High School, where she studied art from 2005-2009.

She later graduated with a BFA from The School of Visual Arts in 2013, where she studied cartooning, illustration, and animation.

=== Career ===
During college, Fajardo became an intern at the Comic Book Legal Defense Fund, where she assisted the organization with file management and helped at their booths at comic conventions.

After graduating from the School of Visual Arts, Fajardo began exhibiting at comic conventions and zine festivals, selling self-published autobiographical zines that illustrated her experiences with her Latine identity and culture. In 2014, her minicomic Gringa!, which expressed her struggles with cultural identity through assimilation, racism, and fetishization as an American-Latina gained online recognition and was featured on several publications such as HuffPost Latino Voices, Women Write About Comics, HelloGiggles, and NoEcho.

Shortly after, Fajardo began contributing to anthologies and magazines. In 2016, as a response to the lack of Latinx voices in the comics community, Fajardo created and co-edited an all Latinx art and literature collection called La Raza Anthology: Unidos y Fuertes with her partner Pablo A. Castro. In an interview, Fajardo said, "I was like ya no más. Instead of moping around, I’m going to make my own anthology because we really need it". The anthology was a 120-page book featuring illustrations, poetry, short stories, and comics from 42 contributors, and was successfully funded on Kickstarter in 2017.

After some time, through her agent Linda Camacho, Fajardo began working with kidlit publishers on cover art for middle grade books such as The First Rule of Punk by Celia C. Perez, Shaking Up the House by Yamile Saied Méndez, BUMP and The Supervillain's Guide to Being a Fat Kid, both by Matt Wallace.

In 2018, her first graphic novel for children was published, The Isle of the Lost: The Graphic Novel, a comic adaption of the New York Times best-selling Descendants series written by Melissa de la Cruz. The graphic novel was adapted by Robert Venditti, illustrated by Fajardo, lettered and colored by Leigh Luna with assistance by Madeline McGrane and Andrea Bell.

In 2022, Fajardo released her solo debut graphic novel for middle-grade readers, Miss Quinces, published by Scholastic-Graphix, which was simultaneously released in both English and Spanish editions (as Srta. Quinces), a first in Graphix history. Miss Quinces received two starred reviews, and was selected as a summer reading pick by Entertainment Weekly, Publishers Weekly, The Horn Book, and the Milwaukee Journal Sentinel.

== Works ==
- Miss Quinces (2022) ISBN 9781338746495
- The Isle of the Lost: The Graphic Novel (2018) ISBN 9781368045452
- La Raza Anthology (2017) ISBN 9780692826676
- ¡Bandida! Series (2016)
- Gringa! (2015)

Featured in:

- Dirty Diamonds Anthology (2016)
- Sweaty Palms Zine (2016)
- CollegeHumor (2014)
- Symbolia Magazine (2012-2014)
- BARTKIRA (2013)
- Strange Paradise Zine (2013)
- The White Asylum (2013)
- Monster Mash Anthology (2012)
- Hope Mountain Magazine #3 (2012)
- SVA INK Magazine (2012-2015)
- SVA Visual Opinion Mag (2011)

== Literary style and themes ==
Fajardo's work is heavily influenced by her personal search for wholeness in her cultural identity as an American Latina of Colombian and Honduran heritage. Her 17-page mini comic Gringa! is a candid chronicle of her struggle “through assimilation, racism, and fetishization of Latin culture”. The cover of Gringa! depicts the main character, Fajardo herself, in a state of cultural divide. Half of her outfit is emblazoned with the stars and stripes of America while the other half proudly dons a traditional Latin American dress. On the Latino side, her hair is jet black and long; on the other side, her hair is bleached lighter and cropped short in an attempt to seamlessly assimilate into American culture. The first few pages of ‘’Gringa!’’ depict vitriolic attacks on immigrants from American protesters holding signs that read words like "'Diversity’=White Genocide” and “Return to Sender!” Fajardo reflects on the hardships immigrants face—“leaving their families behind and endangering their lives” only to arrive in America to unjustified racism and hostility. She ultimately recognizes that she should be proud of her heritage, but cannot find the courage to outwardly celebrate it. She cites a variety of factors: lack of Latino studies in academia and representation in television and cinema, fetishization and racism from classmates, and pressure from her own family to become a “proper lady” and “accept Machismo as the norm.” She does her best to conform and pass for the prototypical white American woman, but "mi raza" (literally translating as "my race") holds her fast. Years later, after discussing common experiences with Latino youth, she realizes that any discrimination she receives due to her heritage is no longer an obstacle for her, but “fuel” for her own creativity. She ends the comic proud of her journey of self-discovery and self-acceptance, and hopes to use her artwork to contribute to better representation of Latinos and Hispanics in the media.

Fajardo is currently working on La Raza Anthology, which is a collection of comics, illustrations, poems, and short stories by more than 30 Latino creators discussing topics such as assimilation, racism, feminism, and queer and self-identity. La raza is a term stemmed from Mexican scholar José Vasconcelos's phrase, La Raza Cósmica ("the cosmic race"). Because Latin America is a mixture of different races and cultures, Farjardo uses la raza as a term to define her community by celebrating her roots. The anthology is an effort to give Latino creators proper recognition and address issues important to Latino culture.

== Honors, decorations, awards and distinctions ==
In 2016, Fajardo's minicomic, Bandida, was a recipient of the Massachusetts Independent Comics Expo (MICE) mini-grant.

In 2017, Fajardo was awarded the CXC Emerging Talent Award at the Cartoon Crossroads Columbus, which was presented by Tom Spurgeon and Jeff Smith.

In 2018, La Raza Anthology was nominated for an Ignatz Award for Best Anthology. Fajardo and Pablo A. Castro were the editors.

In 2019, Puerto Rico Strong Anthology won the 2019 Eisner Award for Best Anthology. The anthology contains work by Fajardo.

In 2020, Drawing Power: Women's Stories of Sexual Violence, Harassment and Survival anthology won the 2020 Eisner Award for Best Anthology. The anthology contains work by Fajardo.
