= Etta Hulme =

American cartoonist

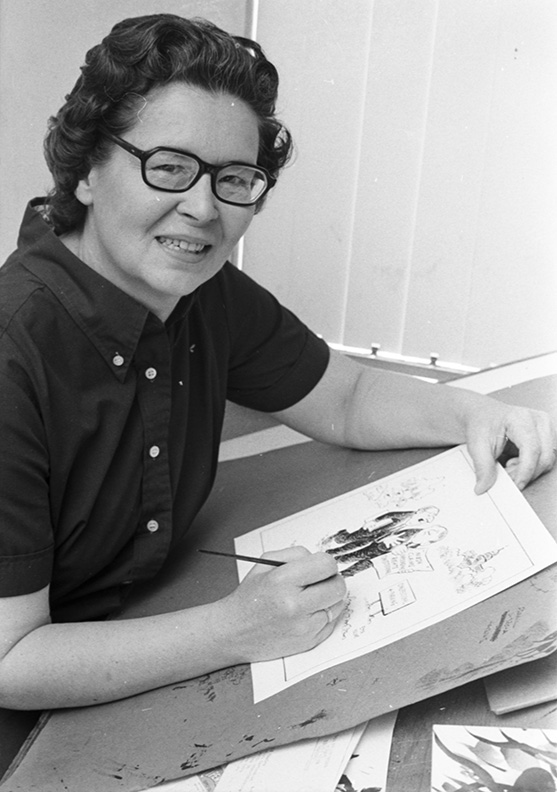
- Born: Etta Grace Parks; December 22, 1923; Somerville, Texas
- Died: June 25, 2014 (aged 90); Arlington, Texas
- Occupation: Editorial cartoonist

Etta Hulme (December 22, 1923 – June 25, 2014) was an American editorial cartoonist. Her syndicated cartoons started appearing in the Fort Worth Star-Telegram in 1972. Her drawing style has been described as "understated". Star-Telegram editorial page director Tommy Denton called her "one of the most insightful and provocative cartoonists in the country."

Hulme was born Etta Grace Parks in Somerville, Texas, on December 22, 1923 to Charles and Grace (Redford) Parks. She submitted cartoons to The New Yorker as a teenager, although they were not published. She graduated from the University of Texas with a fine art degree and worked for the Walt Disney animation studio in California, under the tutelage of Ward Kimball. In the 1950s, she did freelance work for The Texas Observer. She married Vernon C. Hulme in 1952 in Kitzingen, Germany, and went on to have four children, two boys and two girls.

Hulme won the National Cartoonists Society Editorial Cartoon Award for 1981 and 1998. In addition, she was elected the president of the American Association of Editorial Cartoonists. She was one of the first women to find success as an editorial cartoonist, establishing herself before other trailblazers such as M. G. Lord of Newsday and Signe Wilkinson of the Philadelphia Daily News in the 1980s. In the late 1980s, she was thought to be one of only five or six women employed as an editorial cartoonist in the United States.

Known for her wit and liberal perspective, Hulme's cartoons have attracted criticism from conservatives, including her depiction of Rush Limbaugh. Some commentators have compared her political perspective to columnist Molly Ivins and Texas governor Ann Richards. Hulme herself once commented that one of the most distressing events she covered in her work was the Waco siege. Her last cartoon was published in December 2008, and featured George W. Bush and Dick Cheney.

After surviving a heart attack in early 2009, Hulme died at her home in Arlington, Texas, on June 24, 2014, at the age of 90.
