= Martha Kennedy =

Eisner award winning author and curator

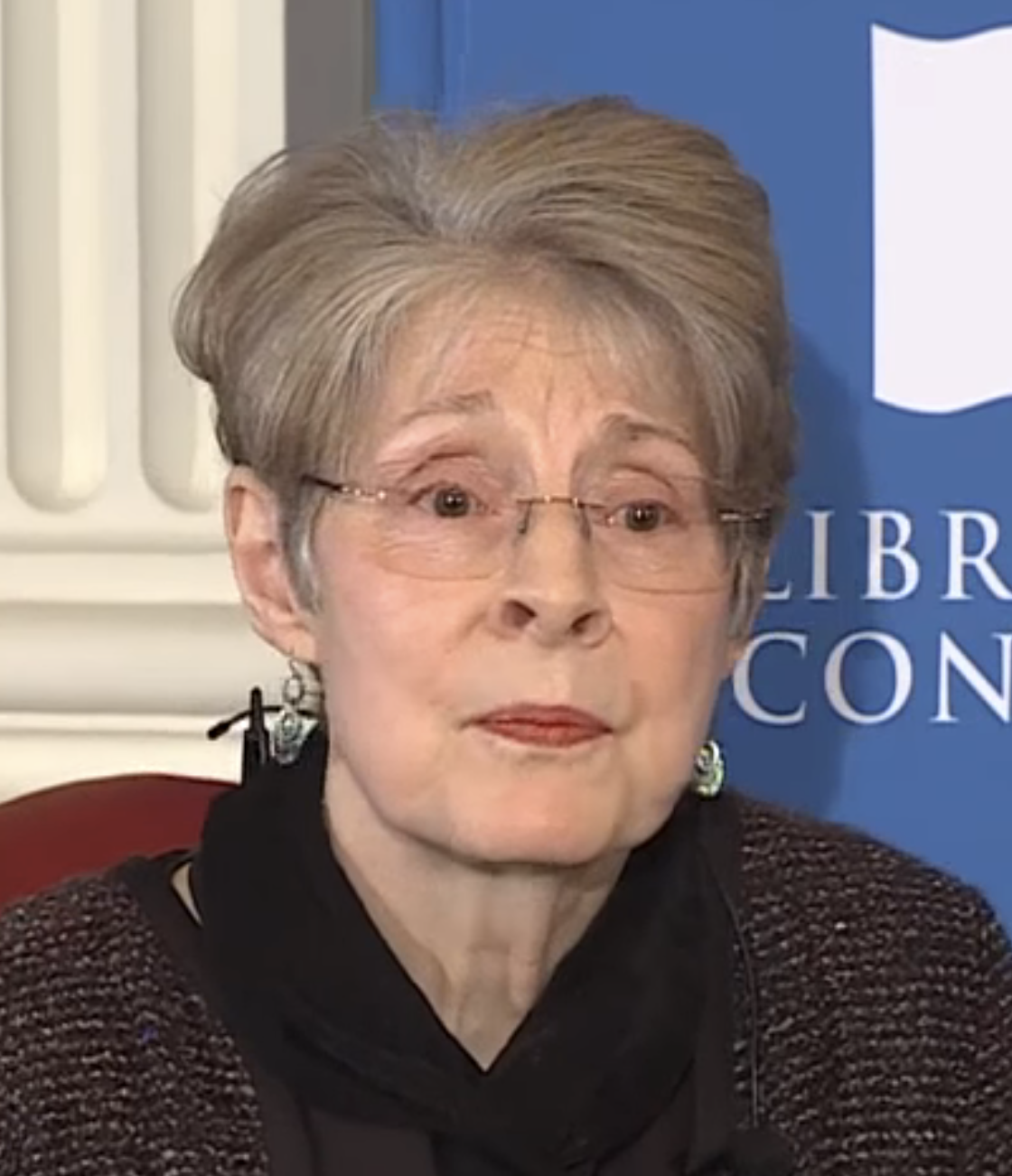
Kennedy in 2018

Martha Hoeprich Kennedy (born 1951) is an Eisner award winning author and curator of popular and applied graphic arts at the Library of Congress (LoC).

Kennedy has curated many exhibits at the LoC including:

- Enduring Outrage: Editorial Cartoons by Herblock (with Sarah Willett Duke, 2006)
- Timely and Timeless with some of the library's recent acquisitions (2011)
- Drawn to Purpose: American Women Illustrators and Cartoonists (2018)
- Art in Action, about social justice issues (with Katherine Blood, 2019)

Enduring Outrage was favorably reviewed by Archivaria, The Journal of the Association of Canadian Archivists, for just how much the content "remained relevant over the course of fifty years." Kennedy created a companion book for the 2018 exhibit, called Drawn to Purpose, published by the Library of Congress, in association with University of Mississippi Press. Kennedy created the exhibit, in part, because she was impressed by the amount of work by women artists in the LOC's collection but also dismayed by the lack of "recognition and appreciation for these creators and their work." She had previously co-curated an exhibition of the work of editorial cartoonist Ann Telnaes in 2004.

Kennedy's book won an Eisner Award in 2019 for Best Comics-Related Book and it was noted by the College Art Association as having "inclusive scope" offering "an impressive cross-section of artists of different races, ages, sexual orientations, and political affiliations." Kennedy had gotten to host Will Eisner at the Library of Congress in 2003.

In an attempt to broaden the scope of the items that they collect, Kennedy and her colleague from Fine Prints, Katherine Blood, have established a "big box" on site at the library where people can deposit items they think may be of interest to the librarians. Kennedy writes for the LoC's blog on topics such as Will Eisner's legacy, Herb Block's relationship to Picasso, and Anne Mergen's editorial cartoons. She serves on the editorial board of the International Journal of Comic Art.

== Early life and education ==
Kennedy was born in Boston Massachusetts to Paul Daniel Hoeprich and Muriel B. Hoeprich. Kennedy has a B.A. and an M.A. in History of Art, as well as an MLIS from University of California, Berkeley. She is married to Dane Kennedy and lives in Fairfax, Virginia.
