= Barbara Shermund =

American cartoonist and illustrator

- Self portrait of Shermund
- Born: June 26, 1899; San Francisco, California, U.S.
- Died: September 9, 1978 (aged 79); Middletown Township, New Jersey, U.S.
- Resting place: Cypress Lawn Memorial Park
- Education: California School of Fine Arts
- Occupation: Cartoonist
- Employer: New Yorker

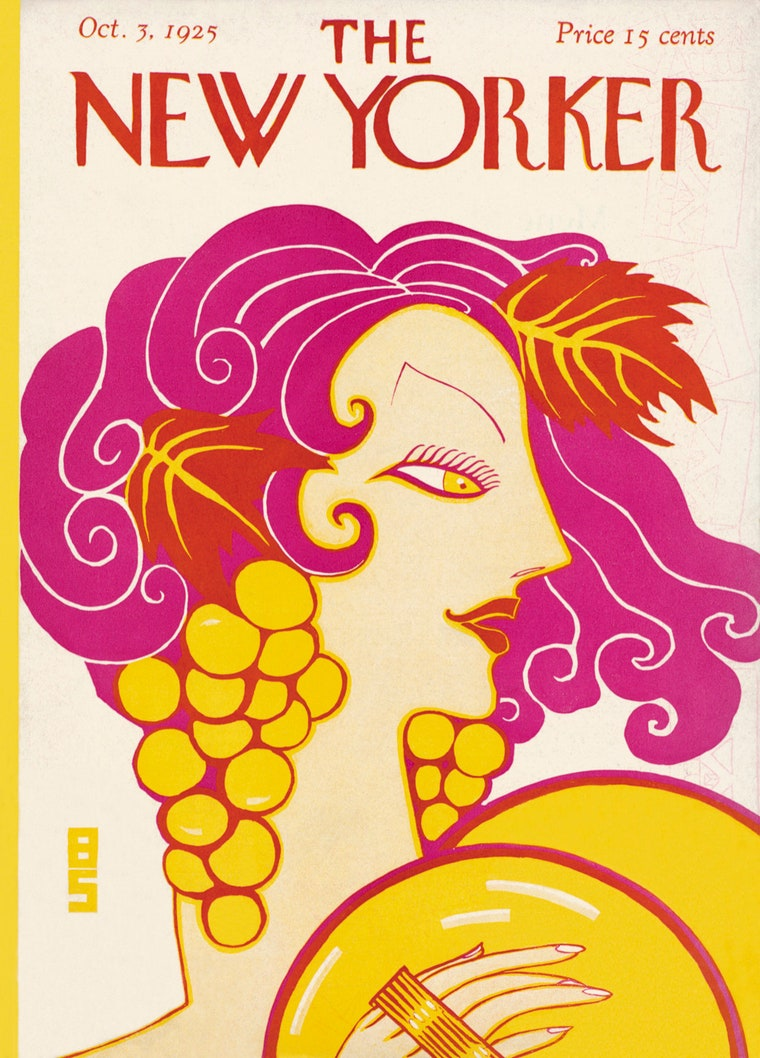
Cover of The New Yorker issue for October 3, 1925, by Shermund

Barbara Shermund (June 26, 1899 – September 9, 1978 ) was an American cartoonist whose work appeared in The New Yorker from its first year in 1925. She was one of the first three women cartoonists inducted into the National Cartoonists Society in 1950.

== Early life and education ==
Barbara Shermund was born in San Francisco on June 26, 1899. Her father, Henry Shermund, was an architect and her mother, Fredda Cool, was a sculptor. Shermund's talent emerged very early in her life and her parents encouraged her to follow her passion. She attended the California School of Fine Arts and studied painting and printmaking. Her first artwork was published when she was nine years old on the San Francisco Chronicle's children's page under the title 'On the farm'. In 1911, she published a short story for a writing contest in The San Francisco Call. She moved to New York in 1925 after her mother's death from Spanish flu. Initially she stayed with friends, either in New York City or in Woodstock. When her father remarried, it was to a woman who was eight years younger than she.

== Cartoon career ==
Shermund began her career in New York by creating spot illustrations. Her first cartoon appeared in January 1926. She created covers, illustration and cartoons for Esquire, Life and Collier's.

In February 1925, Harold Ross launched The New Yorker as a humorous Manhattan-centric magazine. Shermund was one of the first women cartoonists to work for The New Yorker after its launch. Shermund supplied a cover in June and in October and she became a frequent contributor. Over 600 of her cartoons were published in The New Yorker and also contributed nine cover illustrations for the magazine. Shermund wrote her own captions under her cartoons. Her creations were satirical and often had a feminist and poignant tone reflecting the early 20th century view of the New Woman. One cartoon showed two men seated by a fire with the caption, "Well, I guess women are just human beings after all." Shermund also contributed to magazines like Life, Colliers, Judge, and many others.

Shermund's classical training characterised her style. Her cartoons can be identified by their bold, loose lines. She used pencil and brush and she sketched a first draft on heavy 24 x 36 inch watercolour paper. Unlike other artists, She did not have a studio and she used to draw at her kitchen table. Her work evolved along with the magazine. In the 1930s, her style started to change. Her strong female voice altered as the magazine evolved. By the 1940s, her cartoons were stylised and less realistic with less poignant captions. From 1944 to 1957, she produced "Shermund's Sallies", a syndicated cartoon panel for Pictorial Review, the arts and entertainment section of Hearst's many Sunday newspapers. Shermund, Hilda Terry and Edwina Dumm were the first three women cartoonists inducted into the National Cartoonists Society in 1950. Shermund continued to draw at her home in Sea Bright, New Jersey, until shortly before her death.

== Death and legacy ==
Shermund died in a nursing home in Middletown Township, New Jersey, in 1978 after losing contact with her family. 35 years later, when her niece, Amanda Janes Gormley, searched for Shermund's burial site, she was surprised to find that her ashes remained in a funeral home. Between 2011 and 2024, Amanda Janes Gormley, who happened to also be a professional investigator, became the primary researcher of Shermund’s life and ultimately provided her entire body of research to the Billy Ireland Museum of Cartoon Art.

This painstaking research work led to Shermund’s first ever exhibit, the burial of her ashes at Cypress Lawn Memorial Park, and the placement of her headstone. In 2022, the New York Times published a belated obituary for Shermund.

Shermund's life and work are recounted in Tell Me a Story Where the Bad Girl Wins: The Life and Art of Barbara Shermund, a 2024 biography edited by Caitlin McGurk and published by Fantagraphics. The Brandywine Conservancy and Museum of Art, Chadds Ford, PA, had a show of her works from February 15, 2025 - June 1, 2025.

Shermund was first mentioned in Judith Lee's book, "Defining New Yorker Humor." She is profiled in Liza Donnelly's history, "Funny Ladies: The New Yorker's Women Cartoonists and Their Cartoons," published in 2005, and in Donnelly's subsequent edition, "Very Funny Ladies." Donnelly wrote a profile of Shermund for The New Yorker magazine in 2019.
