= Ray Evans (cartoonist) =

American cartoonist (1887–1954)

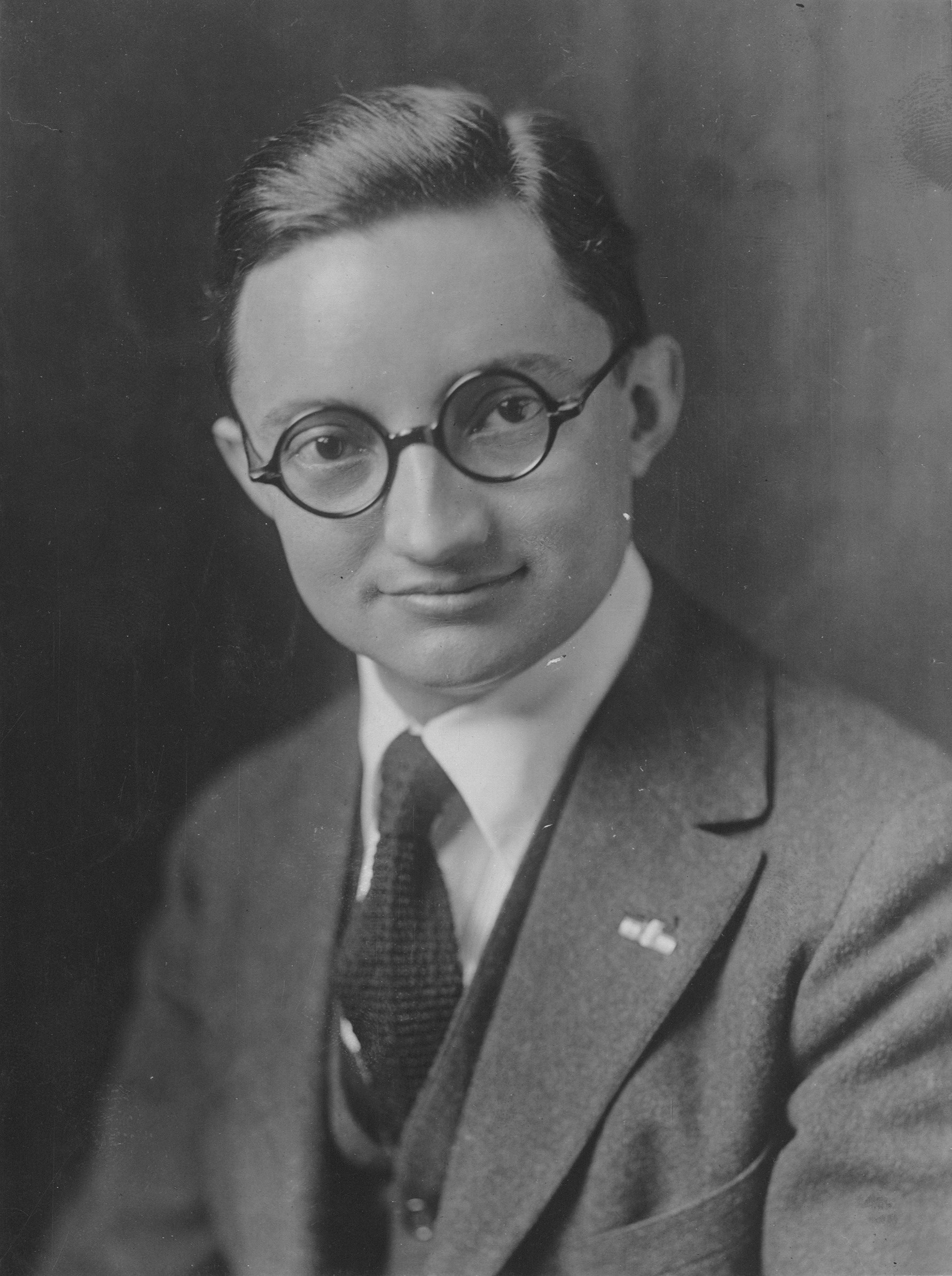

Raymond Oscar Evans (December 1, 1887 – January 18, 1954) was a widely circulated American editorial cartoonist who was active from 1910 to 1954. He is best known for his cartoons entitled The Americanese Wall – As Congressman Burnett would build it and It’s Going To Be Just Turned Around, both dealing with immigration.

== Early and personal life ==
Evans was born in Columbus, Ohio, to Oscar R. (Ben) and Mary F. Evans and was the oldest of four children. His father was a ticket agent for a railroad company, and Ray attended public schools in Columbus.

He attended Ohio State University, where he was a member of Sigma Pi fraternity. He and W. M. Kiplinger recruited Dudley Fisher to join the fraternity. He was also the illustrator for the 1909 edition of the MakiO yearbook. After graduating in 1910, he became an advertising artist for The Columbus Dispatch. In 1911 he was able to get Fisher an interview with editor Arthur Johnson Sr to begin his career. He then worked for part of 1912 with The Dayton Daily News.

Evans married Helen Holter on October 11, 1911. They had two children before 1920, Ray Jr. and Dorothy. Their third child, a daughter named Patricia, was born in the 1920s. He was a member of the Methodist church.

== Career ==
=== Baltimore ===
Evans moved to Baltimore, where he became a political cartoonist for The Baltimore American around 1913 and stayed there through 1922. From 1920 to 1922 he was also a staff artist for the Baltimore News.

During his time in Baltimore, he began to make a name for himself, and his works were published in magazines such as The Literary Digest, Judge, The Outlook, Life, and Puck. He taught cartooning at the Maryland Institute College of Art. He was a member of the Charcoal Club of Baltimore, the School Art League, and the National Press Club of Washington. He also developed his ability to write cleverly in connection with his news and sketches. His book Club Men of Maryland in Caricature was published in 1915.

=== Columbus ===
In 1922 Evans moved back to Columbus and began working at The Dispatch again as an artist. While at The Dispatch he was again working with Dudley Fisher and Billy Ireland, and later Milton Caniff. Ireland was well known by that time and ran several strips, one of which was an occasional sketch called Flowers for the Living, which praised a local person for his or her kindness and generosity. While Ireland was on his vacation in 1923, Evans filled in for him and sketched his own Flowers for the Living that recognized Ireland. In 1927 Ireland did a series of cartoons on fraternities at Ohio State, with Evans and Fisher appearing in the one on Sigma Pi which ran in June of that year.

In 1933 Columbus was recognized for its amount of cartoonists by Osman C. Hooper in his book on Ohio journalism. Evans, Fisher, and Ireland were all mentioned by name. Like most political cartoonists of the 1930s, Evans commented on the New Deal and President Franklin D. Roosevelt.

During World War II Evans continued working at The Dispatch but also produced propaganda material for the U.S. government and the Red Cross.

By the late 1940s Evans had become the chief cartoonist for The Dispatch and had hired his son, Ray Evans Jr, to work with him.

Evans died on January 18, 1954, at his home in Columbus.

== Since death ==
Some of Evans's work was displayed at the Ohio Cartoonists: A Bicentennial Celebration exhibition during the summer and early fall of 2003 at Ohio State University. One of his cartoons was also mentioned in Marc Leepson’s 2007 book Flag: An American Biography.
