= Cartoon Crossroads Columbus =

Comics festival

- Status: Active
- Genre: Comics
- Frequency: annual
- Venue: Multiple Ohio State University and downtown Columbus venues
- Location: Columbus, Ohio
- Country: United States
- Inaugurated: 2015
- Founders: Jeff Smith, Lucy Shelton Caswell, Vijaya Iyer
- Most recent: Sept. 27–Oct. 1, 2023
- Next event: Sept. 26–29, 2024
- Executive Director: Jay Kalagayan
- Website: cartooncrossroadscolumbus.com

Cartoon Crossroads Columbus (CXC) is an annual, free, four-day celebration of cartooning and graphic novels held in Columbus, Ohio. Venues for the festival include Ohio State University's Billy Ireland Cartoon Library & Museum, Hale Hall, and the Wexner Center for the Arts; and downtown Columbus' Columbus Metropolitan Library, the Columbus Museum of Art, and the Columbus College of Art and Design.

CXC is held in the spirit of European conventions like the Angoulême International Comics Festival. As such, it is focused on the art and literature of the comics form, and only minimally on related pop-culture expression and merchandising. The show tends to highlight the "alternative comics" genre, as opposed to the work of "mainstream" publishers like DC Comics and Marvel Comics. Cosplaying is rarely if ever a feature of CXC. In addition to the "CXC Expo and Marketplace" (held in the Columbus Metropolitan Library), CXC features art exhibits, animation screenings, panel discussions, and workshops.

Cartoon Crossroads Columbus gives out an annual Emerging Artist Prize; the CXC has also distributed Master Cartoonist awards and a Transformative Work Award, and since 2021 the Tom Spurgeon Award.

Cartoon Crossroads Columbus was founded in 2015 by, among others, Columbus-based cartoonist Jeff Smith. Smith serves as the festival's president and artistic director. Tom Spurgeon served as executive director until his death in November 2019. The current executive director is Jay Kalagayan.

CXC is held in conjunction each year with SÕL-CON: The Brown And Black Comics Expo, also held in Columbus, founded in 2015 by comics scholars Frederick Aldama, John Jennings, and Ricardo Padilla.

== History ==
The CXC website details the origins of the convention:

As a founder and world-renowned curator of the Billy Ireland Cartoon Library & Museum, Lucy Shelton Caswell had already helped organize a semi-annual Cartoon Arts Festival in Columbus for many years. She knew it could become more, because she knew so many influential people throughout the city and the industry that shares her passion. But two in particular knew how much support Columbus institutions offered for the cartoon arts: the husband-and-wife team behind Cartoon Books, Columbus native Jeff Smith and his wife Vijaya Iyer. The three of them talked about how some cities in Europe would turn themselves over to their comics festivals, and how much each festival would spend a week showing people the best of each city offers the cartoon community, and how first-class treatment of cartooning talent not only brought in industry greats, but created an atmosphere where connections between the creators and fans could be had. They believed Columbus was a place they could create a truly unique festival experience that could rival anything that had overseas. Being in the heart of the country, it could be the crossroads where museums and art centers, learning institutions and cultural landmarks, industry legends and aspiring creators, as well as professionals and fans could meet to celebrate cartoon storytelling like no other place on Earth. That day, Cartoon Crossroads Columbus was drawn into existence.

Katie Skelly was awarded the inaugural Emerging Artist Prize at the 2015 Cartoon Crossroads Columbus.

Carol Tyler was declared a Master Cartoonist at the 2016 CXC; that same year the festival expanded to four days.

In 2017, Kat Fajardo was the recipient of the Emerging Talent Award, and Laura Park was the recipient of Columbus Museum of Art Columbus Comics Residency.

The 2019 show featured a keynote event conversation between Mike Mignola and Jeff Smith. It also featured a history of British animation (selected by the British Film Institute) and a panel discussion on the impact of the presidency of Donald Trump on political cartooning.

The 2020 show was held entirely online due to the COVID-19 pandemic. The 2021 show was a mixture of live and virtual events; that year also saw the introduction of the Tom Spurgeon Award, "to honor an individual who has made substantial contributions to the field but is not primarily a cartoonist."

=== Dates and locations ===
Dates	Special guests	Notes
Oct. 1–3, 2015	Jeff Smith, Kate Beaton, Art Spiegelman, Craig Thompson, Bill Griffith, Francoise Mouly, Jerry Beck	
Oct. 13–16, 2016	Bruce Worden, Derf Backderf, Garry Trudeau, Sergio Aragonés, Raina Telgemeier, Nate Beeler, Charles Burns, Ann Telnaes, Ronald Wimberly, Stan Sakai, Mark Osborne, Keith Knight, Julia Gfrörer, Lalo Alcaraz, John Canemaker, Brandon Graham, Jay Hosler, Ben Katchor, Ed Koren, Sacha Mardou, Seth, Carol Tyler, Scottie Young	
Sept. 28–Oct. 1, 2017	Derf Backderf, Kat Fajardo, Laura Park, Kelly Sue DeConnick, Nilah Magruder, Ann Nocenti	
Sept. 27–30, 2018	Liana Finck, Georgia Webber, M. K. Czerwiec, Rachel Lindsay, Hilary Price, Noah Van Sciver, Emi Gennis, Michael DeForge, Annie Koyama, Dustin Harbin, Keiler Roberts, Jessica Campbell, Jim Woodring, Lynn Johnston, Darrin Bell	
Sept. 26–29, 2019	Natasha Alterici, Ho Che Anderson, Ezra Claytan Daniels, Terri Libenson, Tom Tomorrow, Frank Santoro, Dav Pilkey, Mike Mignola, Ann Telnaes, Liana Finck, Georgia Webber, M. K. Czerwiec, Rachel Lindsay, Hilary Price	
Oct. 1–4, 2020	Program moved entirely online due to the COVID-19 pandemic	
Sept. 30-Oct. 3, 2021	Alison Bechdel, Jamila Rowser, Hilary Price, Ronald Wimberly, Jerry Craft, Jeff Smith, Lewis Trondheim, Shary Flenniken, Steenz, CM Campbell, Robyn Smith, Elsa Charretier, Erin Cosgrove, Victoria Jamieson, Omar Mohamed, Bianca Xunise, Derek Kirk Kim, Lora Innes, Bryan Moss, Katie Shanahan, Joey Alison Sayers, Jonathan Lemon, M. S. Harkness, Trina Robbins, Robert Triptow, Shena Wolf, Roberta Gregory, Jules Rivera, Thierry Mornet, Patrick McDonnell, Ben Towle, Emi Gennis, Matthew Erman, D’Arcee Neal, Katlin Marisol Sweeney-Romero, Rolando Rubalcava, Lauren Chivington, Sydney Heifler, Chris Samnee, Lisa Sterle, Rafael Rosado, Jay Hosler, Brian Walker, Graham Annable, Nick Anderson	Some programming conducted online due to the COVID-19 pandemic
Oct. 6–9, 2022	Keith Knight, Maia Kobabe, Ed Piskor, Trina Robbins, Tom Gauld, James Sturm, Barbara Brandon-Croft	
Sept. 27–Oct. 1, 2023	Derf Backderf, Shelly Bond, Tauhid Bondia, Reaghan Buchanan, Jessica Campbell, Brenda Chapman, Daniel Clowes, Keito Gaku, Nicole Goux, M. S. Harkness, Mars Heyward, Jannie Ho, John Jennings, Denis Kitchen, Calvin Reid, Chase Schulte, Chris Sprouse, Raina Telgemeier	
Sept. 26-29, 2024	Ahn Jae-Huun, Alexandra Bowman, Art Spiegelman, Ben Passmore, Bianca Xunise, Bryan Lee O’Malley, Chip Zdarsky, Chris Oliveros, Cole Pauls, David Rickert, Ed Steed, Françoise Mouly, Jeff Smith, Jerry Craft, Kate Beaton, L. Pidge, Lisa Sterle, Léonie Bischoff, Maggie Umber, Nate Powell, Rafael Rosado, Rupert Kinnard, Ryan Holmberg, Sam Szabo, Tina Horn	
Sept. 18-21, 2025		Venues for events included: Billy Ireland Cartoon Library and Museum, Columbus College of Art and Design, Columbus Metropolitan Library Main Branch, Columbus Museum of Art, Gateway Film Center, Seventh Son Brewing Co., Slammers, SpringHill Suites by Marriott Columbus OSU, The Walrus, Wexner Center for the Arts

== Awards ==
=== Emerging Talent Prize ===
- 2015 Katie Skelly
- 2016 Kevin Czapiewski
- 2017 Kat Fajardo
- 2018 Keren Katz
- 2019 Carta Monir
- 2020 Gabby Metzler
- 2021 Robyn Smith
- 2022 Victoria Douglas
- 2023 Evan Salazar
- 2024 Kelly Wang

=== Master Cartoonist ===
- 2016 Carol Tyler
- 2019 P. Craig Russell
- 2021 Shary Flenniken
- 2022 Keith Knight
- 2023 Daniel Clowes
- 2024 Kate Beaton

=== Transformative Work Award ===
- 2015 Raw, edited by Art Spiegelman & Françoise Mouly
- 2016 Doonesbury, by Garry Trudeau
- 2017 Stuck Rubber Baby, by Howard Cruse
- 2018 King-Cat Comics, by John Porcellino
- 2019 The Nib, edited by Matt Bors
- 2020 March by John Lewis, Andrew Aydin, and Nate Powell
- 2021 Fun Home, by Alison Bechdel
- 2022 Wimmen's Comix, edited by Lee Marrs and Trina Robbins
- 2023 Smile, by Raina Telgemeier
- 2024 Cathartic Comics, by Rupert Kinnard

=== Tom Spurgeon Award ===
- 2021
  - Mollie Slott
  - Orrin C. Evans
  - Kim Thompson
- 2022 Frederik L. Schodt
- 2023 Calvin Reid
- 2024 Annie Koyama

== See also ==
- Small Press and Alternative Comics Expo
- ECBACC
