= Caitlin McGurk =

- Born: New York, U.S.

Caitlin McGurk (born in 1986 in New York) is an American museum curator, professor, and author, best known for writing the biography on Barbara Shermund, Tell Me a Story Where the Bad Girl Wins: The Life and Art of Barbara Shermund, and her exhibitions on comics and cartoon art history at the Billy Ireland Cartoon Library & Museum at The Ohio State University, where she serves as Curator of Comics and Cartoon Art.

== Early and personal life ==
McGurk grew up in Long Island . McGurk earned a BFA in English, in 2007, from Long Island University. She received a MFA in Library and Information Sciences from the Palmer School of Library Science, in 2010.

== Career ==
McGurk began self-publishing comics and zines after graduating high school.

McGurk earned a master's degree in Library and Information Sciences from the Palmer School of Library Science, in 2010, during which she interned at Marvel Comics and Columbia University.

In 2009, McGurk joined the Schulz Library at the Center for Cartoon Studies as the first librarian on staff, to bring the library up to date with barcode scanning technology, with student workers.

In 2012, McGurk moved to Columbus, Ohio from New York. She began working at the Billy Ireland Cartoon Library & Museum as an assistant curator, before becoming a tenured professor at the Ohio State University where the Museum is affiliated, and the associate curator of Outreach. Some of the work at the Museum that McGurk has helped bring in for future generations includes Jay Lynch's cartoon art.

As of 2025, McGurk is an associate professor and Curator of Comics and Cartoon Art at the Ohio State University.

=== Barbara Shermund research ===
McGurk was introduced to the art of American cartoonist Barbara Shermund while working at the Billy Ireland Cartoon Library & Museum.

As part of her research, McGurk went on a "years-long, coast-to-coast scavenger hunt" to recover materials by and about Shermund from family members and local archives.

In 2018, McGurk curated a retrospective of Shermund's work. That year, she also raised money to bury Shermund's cremated remains with her mother in San Francisco; Shermund's ashes had remained unclaimed in a New Jersey funeral home for more than thirty years.

In 2024, McGurk released her biography on Shermund, published by Fantagraphics Books, called Tell Me a Story Where the Bad Girl Wins: The Life and Art of Barbara Shermund. This book is both the result of a tenure-track project and a 12 year long research project to satisfy McGurk's curiosity on the lack of available information on the feminist cartoonist.

== Awards and recognition ==
In 2009, McGurk won the New York Library Club Award/Gloria Dinerman Scholarship for contributions to furthering comic book librarianship.

In 2016, McGurk won The Ohio State University Libraries' Annual Award in Teaching Excellence.

In 2020, McGurk received The Ohio State University Libraries' Annual Research Excellence Award for "Lovers, enemies, and friends: The complex and coded early history."

In 2025, McGurk's Tell Me a Story Where the Bad Girl Wins: The Life and Art of Barbara Shermund won the Eisner Award for Best Comics-Related Book.

== Other work ==
McGurk helps organize CXC, Cartoon Columbus Crossroads, a small press and alternative comics convention held in Columbus.

McGurk works with Girl Scouts regularly as part of the comics badge offered by Girl Scouts of the USA.

McGurk has been an intermittent co-host of the Found Footage Festival's YouTube series Shaturday Morning Cartoons since 2021.
