= Anne Briardy Mergen =

American editorial cartoonist

- Born: August 19, 1906 Omaha, Nebraska
- Died: July 3, 1994 (age 87) Dade City, Florida
- Areas: cartoonist, editorial cartoonist

Anne Briardy Mergen (August 19, 1906 – July 3, 1994) was an editorial cartoonist who lived in Miami, Florida. Hired by the Miami Daily News in 1933, she was one of the first woman editorial cartoonists in the United States, and for most of her career was the only woman in the U.S. working as an editorial cartoonist.

== Life ==
Mergen was born in Omaha, Nebraska, in 1906 to Frank and Elizabeth Briardy, second-generation Irish immigrants. She studied commercial art at the American Academy of Art in Chicago before moving with her family to Miami in 1926. She worked as a fashion-advertising artist for Burdine's, a department store centered in Florida, before joining the Miami Daily News, part of the Cox newspaper chain, as its editorial cartoonist in 1933.

She married her husband Frank Mergen in 1932 and worked from her home studio in Miami as the mother to two children.

== Work ==
Mergen's transition into the editorial cartooning industry began when she created a one-page fashion story called "Anne and Peg's Scrapbook" and submitted it to the Miami Daily News. The newspaper expanded her story to a two-page feature and published "Anne and Peg's Scrapbook" for three years.

After making this connection to the paper, the Miami Daily News published Mergen's first editorial cartoon in April 1933 and she became the paper's full-time editorial cartoonist in 1936; at the time, she was the only editorial cartoonist at the paper and the only female editorial cartoonist in the U.S.

During her career, Mergen covered political and social issues like the Great Depression, World War II, nuclear power, the Cold War, environmental tourism, and city government.

She retired in 1956, but continued publishing cartoons as late as 1959; Anne Mergen produced over 7,000 cartoons in her lifetime, and her work appeared in the Atlanta Journal, Dayton News, and Miami Daily News.

== Awards and achievements ==
After the Miami Daily News won a 1939 Pulitzer Prize for exposing local government corruption, Mergen's editor Hal Lyshon said, "Don't let anyone ever tell you it wasn't Mergen cartoons that won the Pulitzer today."

She received the Wendy Warren Award from Today's Woman magazine in 1953, an national award for a woman "who has added stature to woman's place in the world, achieved marked success in business, industry, science or the arts, or who has contributed to the community welfare through her activities and accomplishments."

Mergen was also a 2012/2013 nominee for the Florida Women's Hall of Fame for her persistence in the male dominated field of editorial cartooning and for the awareness she brought to local, national, and global issues. During her career, Mergen was praised for her work and even received fan mail from J. Edgar Hoover and Eleanor Roosevelt, later having two of her cartoons hung in the Roosevelt Memorial Room in Hyde Park.

After her death in 1994, her grandchildren, Matthew Bernhardt and Christine Hoverman, donated 600 of her original cartoons to the Cartoon Research Library, which are now held as the Anne Mergen Collection. Many newspapers containing her cartoons are collected at the Library of Congress, the Ohio State University Cartoon Research Library, and the Historical Museum of Southern Florida (now known as HistoryMiami).
