= Billy Ireland Cartoon Library & Museum =

Cartoon museum located on the Ohio State University campus

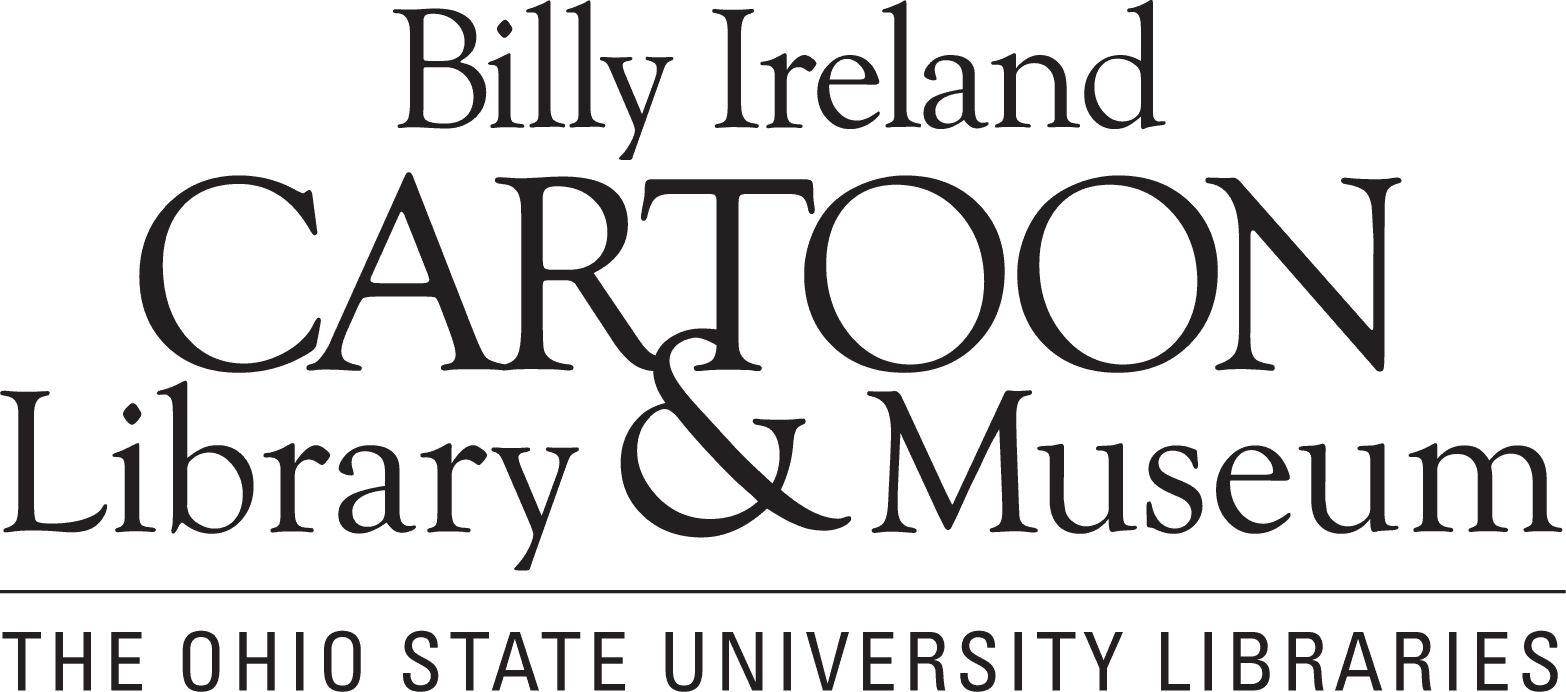
- 39.9995°N 83.0088°W
- Location: Columbus, Ohio
- Type: Research library
- Scope: Comic art
- Established: 1977; 49 years ago
- Branch of: Ohio State University Libraries

Other information
- Director: Jenny E. Robb, Curator and Associate Professor; Lucy Caswell, Founder and former Curator; Wendy Pflug, Associate Curator and Assistant Professor; Caitlin McGurk, Associate Curator for Outreach and Assistant Professor
- Website: cartoons.osu.edu
- Public transit access: 1, 2, 31, Night Owl

The Billy Ireland Cartoon Library & Museum is a research library of American cartoons and comic art affiliated with the Ohio State University library system in Columbus, Ohio. Formerly known as the Cartoon Research Library and the Cartoon Library & Museum, it holds the world's largest and most comprehensive academic research facility documenting and displaying original and printed comic strips, editorial cartoons, and cartoon art. The museum is named after the Ohio cartoonist Billy Ireland.

Covering comic books, daily strips, Sunday strips, editorial cartoons, graphic novels, magazine cartoons, and sports cartoons, the collection includes 450,000 original cartoons, 36,000 books, 51,000 serial titles, and 3,000 feet (910 m) of manuscript materials, plus 2.5 million comic strip clippings and tear sheets.

== History ==
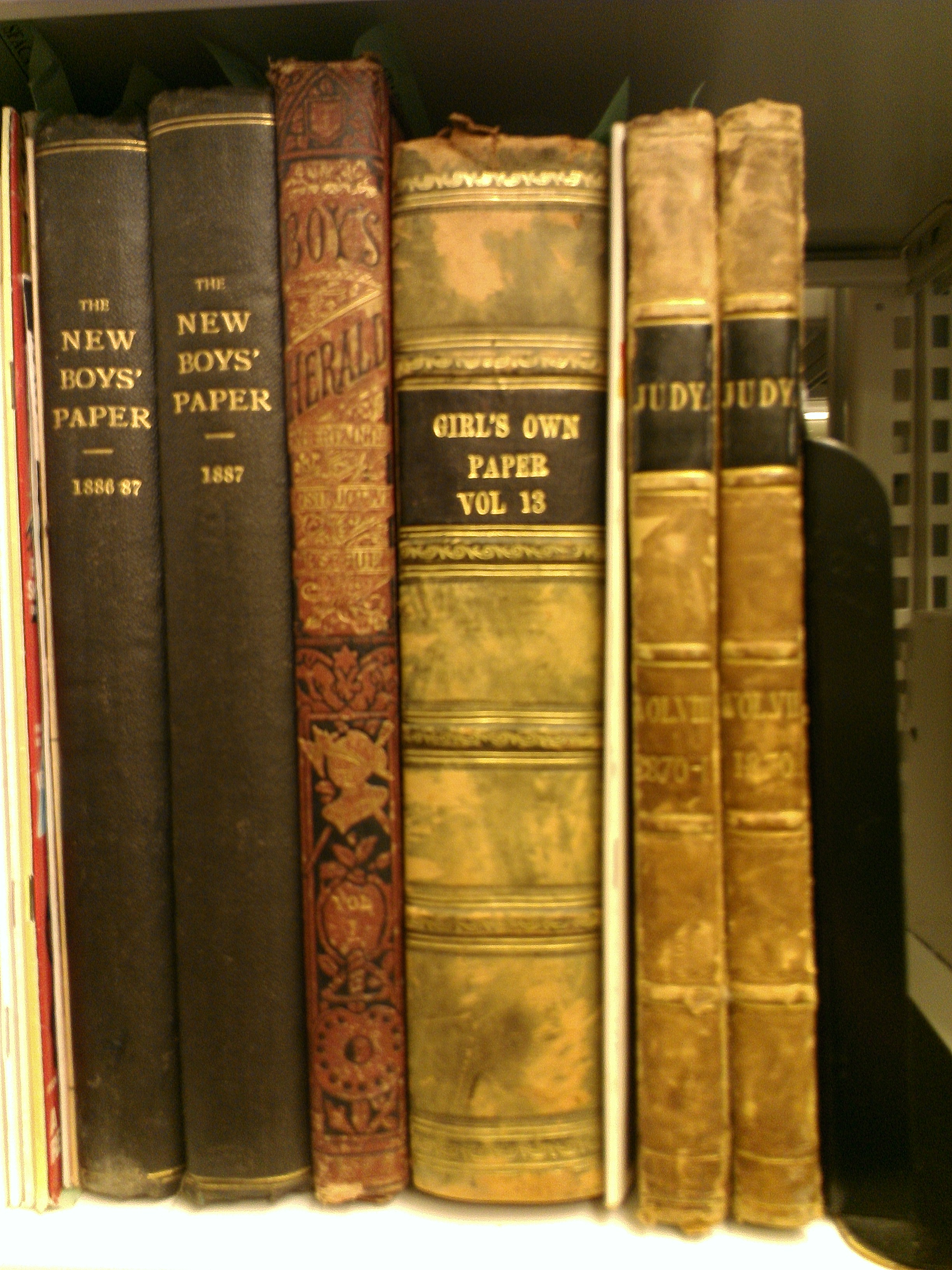
Early newspaper and magazine collections

The Cartoon Library began in 1977 when the Milton Caniff Collection was donated to Ohio State and delivered to the School of Journalism, which was headed by Lucy Shelton Caswell, who became the Milton Caniff Reading Room's first curator. Interviewed by Matt Tauber, Caswell detailed the museum's origins and how she became involved:

Caniff loved his university very much and truly believed that without the education he got here, he would not have achieved the things that he did. So, his sense of gratitude to the university was palpable... Somebody had to be responsible to make sure it was all there, and all the boxes had my name on it. When funding was made available to work on Caniff, I was offered a six-month appointment. I’ve been here ever since. The original collection was housed in the Journalism building. When I started working with it, we were in two classrooms that had been converted, a door cut between them, so that one was a reading room and one was a storage area... At the time that I started, there weren’t really the kinds of resources to teach and learn about comics that we have now. So, I basically had to make it up as we went along. There just wasn’t anything else out there. As a good librarian and scholar, I started writing around to other places that said they had cartoon collections to see how they did things, because you don’t want to reinvent the wheel if somebody’s already figured it out. It turned out that nobody had the kind of thing that we had in the Caniff collection, i.e. so extensive, and the combination of art and manuscript materials. And nobody else was trying to grow it the way we were.

From two classrooms off the back hallway of the Journalism Building in 1977, the collection expanded to three classrooms and became part of the University Libraries. By 1989, the three classrooms were filled, and the library moved into a larger space, eventually requiring the use of off-site storage as the collection continued to expand. (At that point, the facility was named the Cartoon Research Library.)

In 1992, United Media donated the Robert Roy Metz Collection of 83,034 original cartoons by 113 cartoonists. In early 1996, the library accepted a complete run of Newspaper Enterprise Association syndicate proof books (1903–1977), as well as original art and papers from cartoonists P. Craig Russell and Lynn Johnston.

In 1998, the San Francisco Academy of Comic Art Collection was acquired from its director, Bill Blackbeard, giving the library the largest collection of newspaper comic strip tear sheets and clippings in the world. The library was awarded a $100,000 grant from the Getty Foundation to assist in processing the material; six semitrailer trucks transported this collection from California to Ohio.

In 2007, King Features Syndicate donated its proof-sheet collection, consisting of over two million strips (a duplicate set was donated to Michigan State University's Comic Art Collection).

In June 2008, the collection of the International Museum of Cartoon Art (more than 200,000 originals with an estimated value of $20 million) was transferred to the Cartoon Library & Museum. Founded in 1973 by cartoonist Mort Walker, the IMCA collection includes a wide variety of original cartoon art (comic strips, comic books, animation, editorial, advertising, sport, caricature, greeting cards, graphic novels, and illustrations), display figures, toys, and collectibles, plus works on film and tape, CDs, and DVDs. The 2009 exhibition From Yellow Kid to Conan: American Cartoons from the International Museum of Cartoon Art Collection was held at the Cartoon Library and Museum from June to August.

In September 2009, it was announced that the Ohio State University Board of Trustees approved a new name, Billy Ireland Cartoon Library & Museum, in recognition of a $7 million gift from an anonymous donor to support the renovation of Sullivant Hall. The museum was named in honor of William Addison Ireland (1880 – May 29, 1935), a self-taught cartoonist (and native of Chillicothe, Ohio) well known throughout Ohio as "Billy Ireland." Ireland was hired by The Columbus Dispatch shortly after his 1898 high school graduation. Until his death, Ireland worked in Columbus for the Dispatch, drawing both editorial cartoons and his Sunday feature, The Passing Show. His work was exhibited by the museum in 2003 and again in 2010.

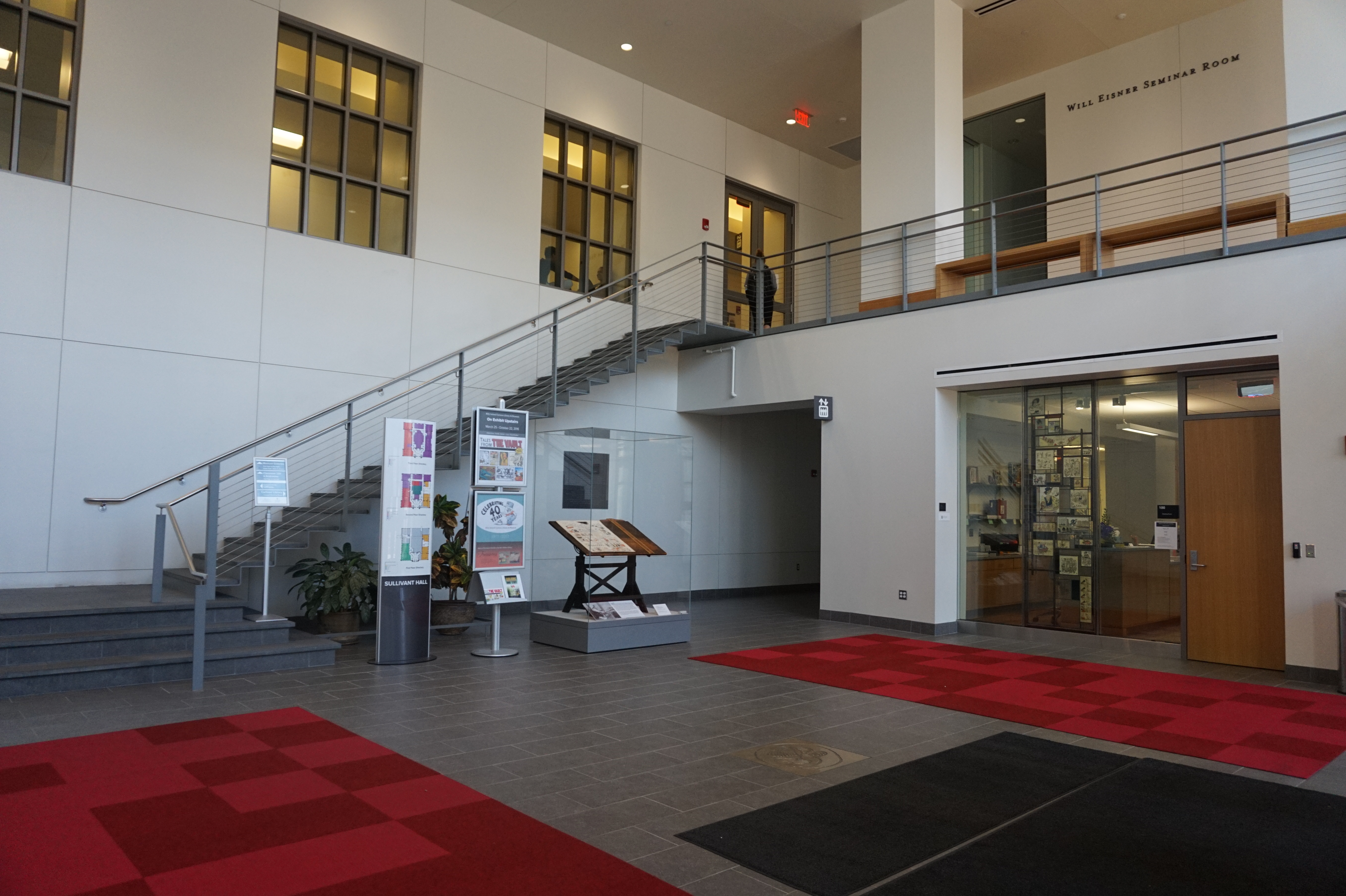
Billy Ireland Cartoon Library & Museum lobby

=== Former names ===
- Milton Caniff Reading Room, from 1977
- Library for Communication and Graphic Arts, c. 1983–1989
- Cartoon Research Library, 1989–1994
- Cartoon, Graphic, and Photographic Arts Research Library, 1994–July 2009
- Cartoon Library and Museum, July 2009–September 2009
- Billy Ireland Cartoon Library & Museum, from September 2009

== Collections and archives ==
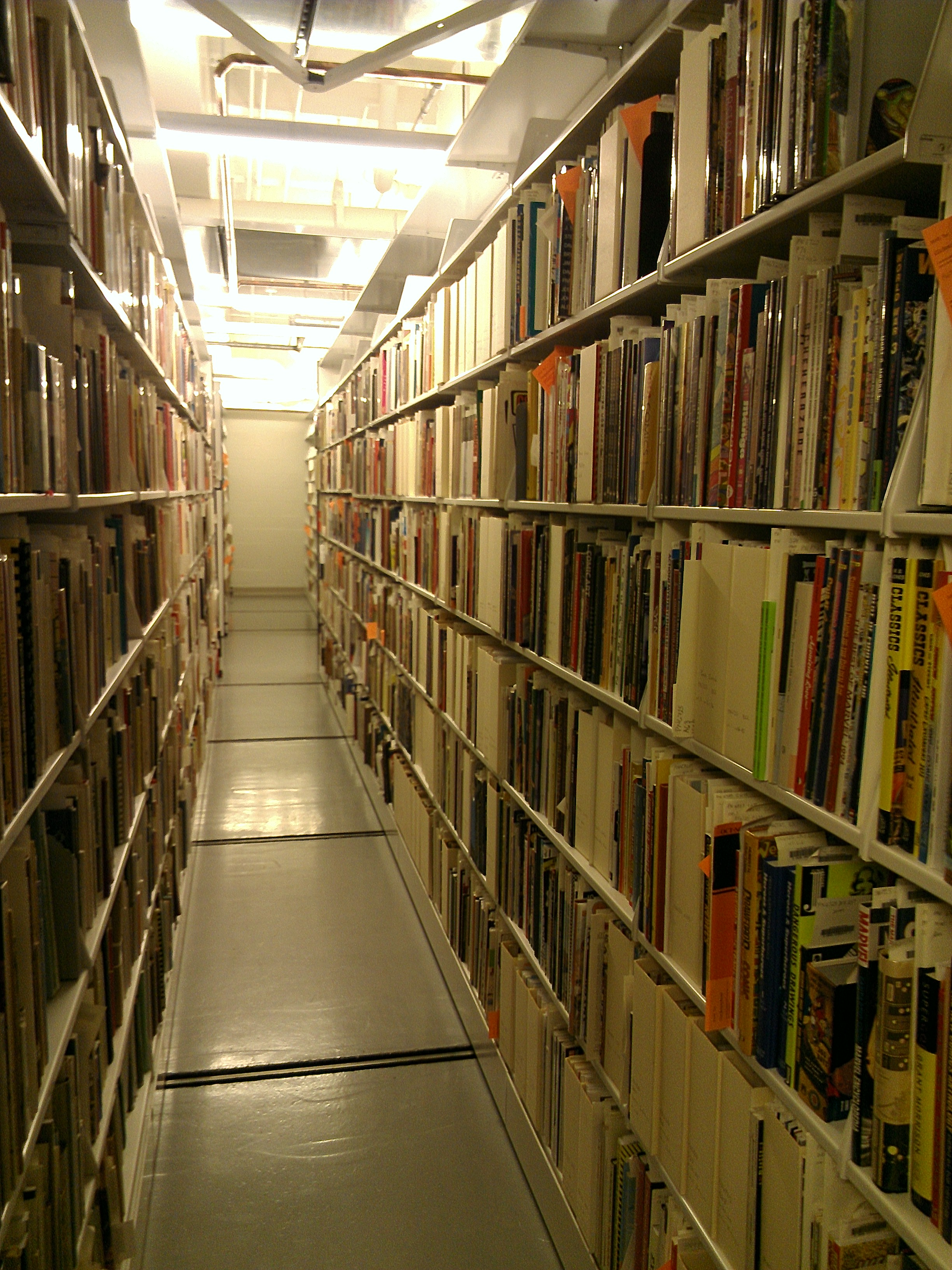
An aisle of stored comics

The Milton Caniff Collection consists of 12,000 original artworks by Caniff, 85 boxes of memorabilia, and more than 450 boxes of manuscript materials, fan letters, and business records.

As the museum's collection of original art and manuscripts evolved and expanded, it added the Nick Anderson Collection, the Jim Borgman Collection, the Eldon Dedini Collection, the Edwina Dumm Collection, the Woody Gelman Collection of Winsor McCay cartoons, the Walt Kelly Collection, the collection of agent Toni Mendez, and the Bill Watterson Collection. The Bud Blake Collection includes more than 5,800 of the cartoon panels he drew for King Features Syndicate from 1954 to 1965, plus 10,000 daily and Sunday Tiger originals. Comic-book collections include the Will Eisner Collection; the Jay Kennedy Collection has more than 9,500 underground comic books.

The museum's collection includes work by Anne Mergen, who was the only female editorial cartoonist in the United States for much of her career.

Archival professional records include the Association of American Editorial Cartoonists, National Cartoonists Society, Newspaper Features Council, and the Cartoonists Guild. A biographical registry of cartoonists contains files for more than 5,000 cartoonists and clipping files organized by cartoon-related subjects.

== Exhibitions ==
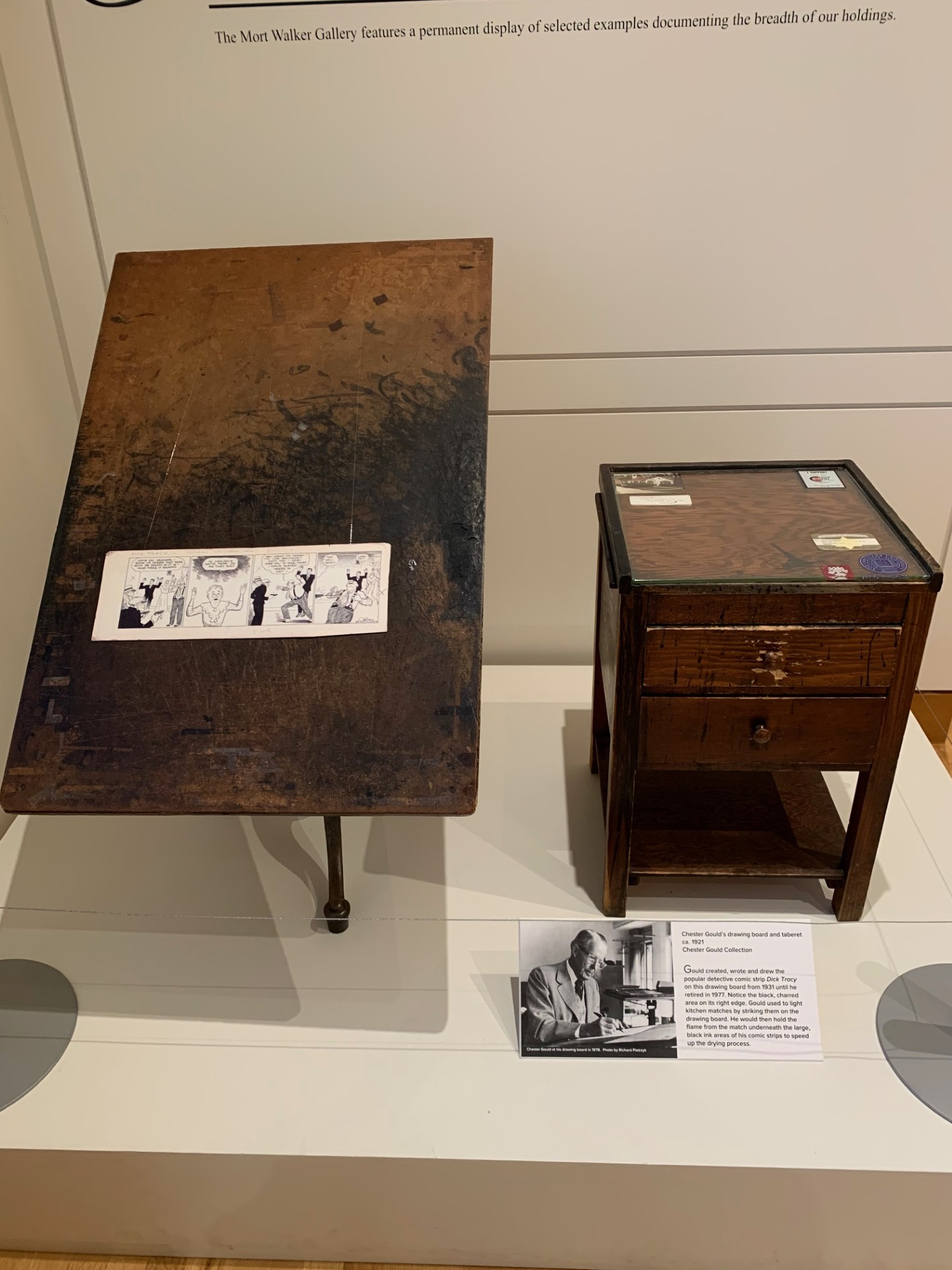
Drawing Board Display, 2023

The library sponsors programs related to cartoon art by staging exhibitions, lending for exhibits elsewhere, and hosting speakers, seminars, workshops and conferences.

Some physical exhibitions have been made available as digital exhibitions.

In addition, select collections from the library have been digitized and are available as part of the library's Digital Exhibits collection.

== Festival of Cartoon Art ==
The Festival of Cartoon Art was held triennially from 1983 to 2013. Featuring two days of lectures, panel discussions, exhibitions, and receptions, it attracted cartoonists, comics scholars, fans, collectors, and students. Leading cartoonists spoke at the festival, including Lynda Barry, Milton Caniff, Will Eisner, Jules Feiffer, Ben Katchor, Patrick Oliphant, Jeff Smith, Art Spiegelman, Garry Trudeau, and Bill Watterson.

== Curators and staff ==
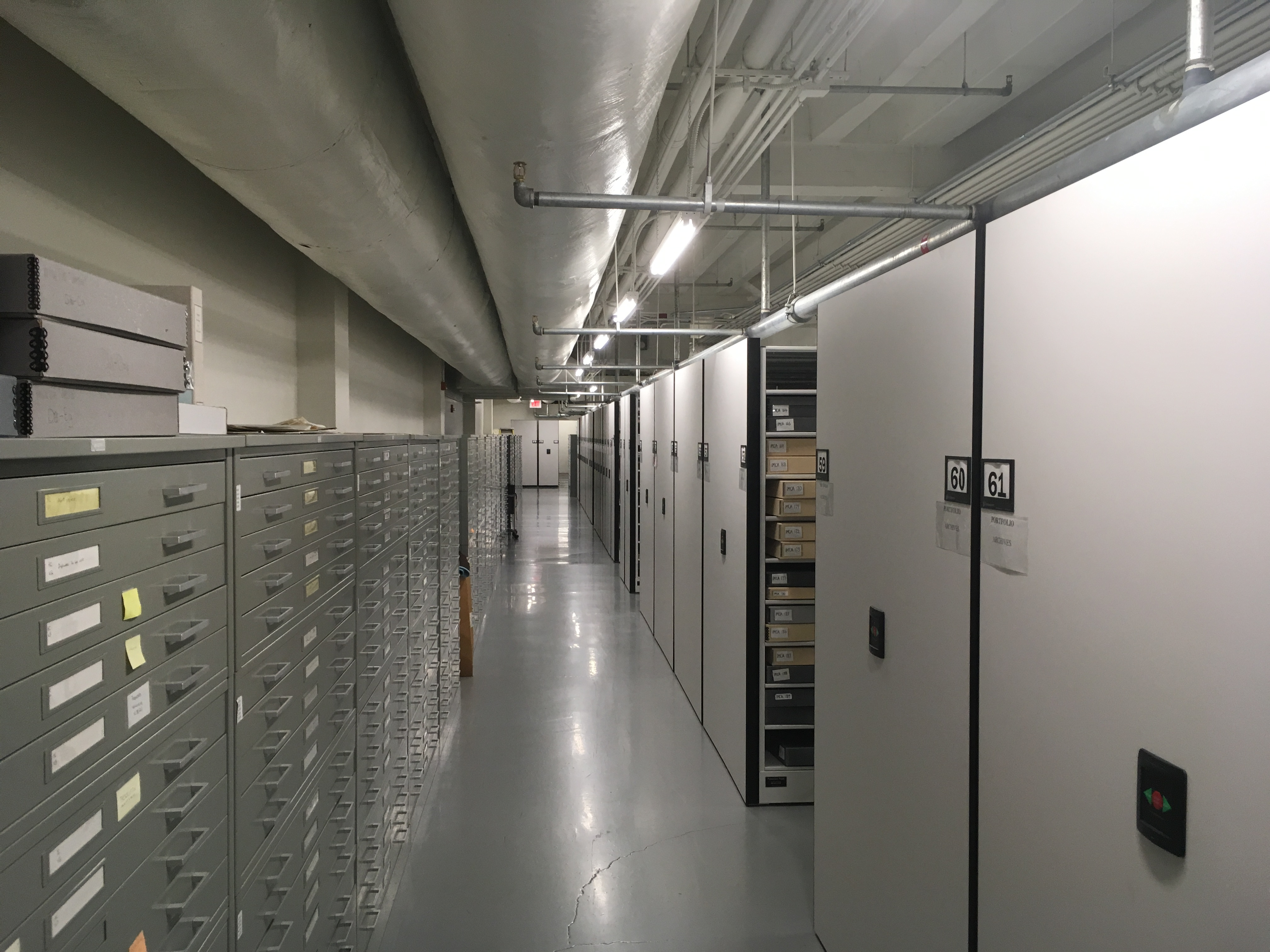
Storage space of the museum

Caswell remained as curator from 1977 to 2010. She is author of several books on cartooning, including Illusions: Ethnicity in American Cartoon Art (Ohio State Libraries, 1992) and Arnold Roth: Free Lance (Fantagraphics, 2001).

Jenny E. Robb became the museum's new curator on January 1, 2011, following the December 31, 2010, retirement of Caswell, who returned as curator of special projects in March 2011. Before arriving at Ohio State in 2005, Robb was curator of the Cartoon Art Museum in San Francisco for five years. She has master's degrees in history and museum studies from Syracuse University. Wendy Pflug joined the staff as associate curator in December 2011. Associate Curator and Assistant Professor Caitlin McGurk, who started as a Visiting Curator in February 2012, manages the libraries outreach efforts, including instruction, exhibits, tours, and social media.

Other staffers include Assistant Curators Susan Liberator and Marilyn Scott.

== Books and publications ==
In May 2010, the Ohio State University Press announced Studies in Comics and Cartoons, a series of books edited by Caswell and Jared Gardner, associate professor in the Department of English. Books published in this series will focus on comics and graphic literature with monographs and edited collections covering the history of comics and cartoons from the editorial cartoon and early sequential comics of the 19th century through contemporary international comics and online comics.

In 2017, the Ohio State University Press began publishing Inks, a new journal for the Comics Studies Society. This journal is published triannually, and "features scholarly research on sequential art, graphic narrative, and cartooning.

== Sullivant Hall location ==
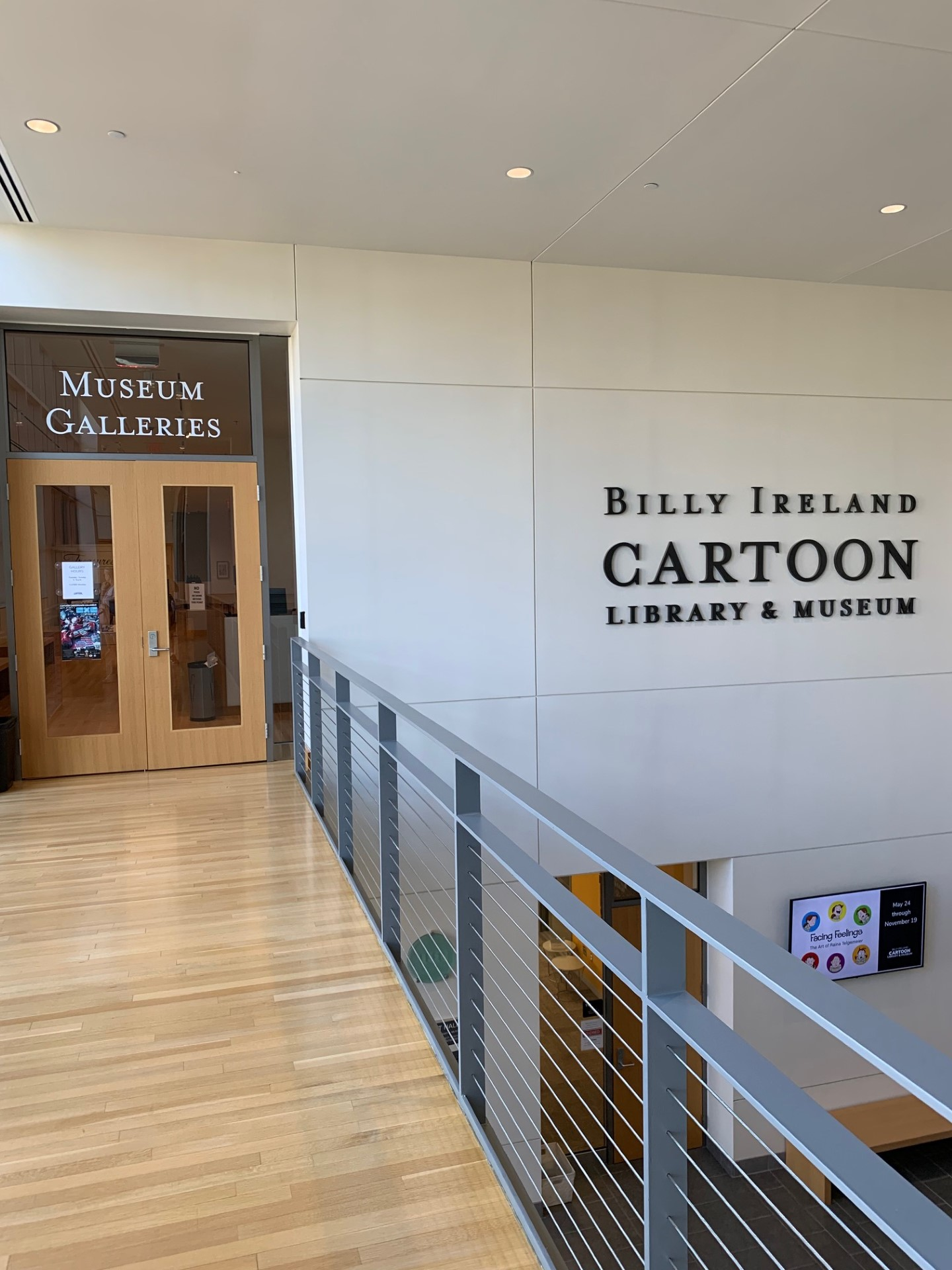
Museum galleries entrance

Expansion for the Billy Ireland Cartoon Library and Museum included the renovation of historic Sullivant Hall located on High Street adjacent to the Wexner Center for the Arts. The facility increased the library's space from 6,808 square feet (632.5 m^{2}) to more than 40,000 square feet (3,700 m^{2}). It features a reading room for researchers, three galleries, and expanded storage space with environmental and security controls.

In May 2009, Jean Schulz, widow of Charles M. Schulz, made a donation of $1 million with a promise of a matching grant if more funds were raised for the renovations. Her challenge was that she would provide an additional gift of $2.5 million if Ohio State raised the same amount from other sources to reach a $6 million total. Cartoonist Bil Keane and his family answered the Schulz Challenge with a $50,000 gift.

The $20.6 million project was completed in 2013, with Sullivant Hall housing both the Billy Ireland Cartoon Library & Museum and Ohio State's Department of Dance.

== Awards ==
- In 2011, Lucy Caswell was honored with the Silver T-Square Award from the National Cartoonists Society.

== See also ==
- Comics Crossroads Columbus
- Allan Holtz
- Belgian Centre for Comic Strip Art
- The Cartoon Museum, London museum dedicated to British cartoons
- Fred Waring Cartoon Collection
- George Kelley Paperback and Pulp Fiction Collection
- List of newspaper comic strips
- Michigan State University Comic Art Collection
- Roger Price Gallery
- ToonSeum
