= Robert Brown (cartoonist) =

American cartoonist (1936–2007)

Robert "Buck" Brown
- Born: Bobby Brown; February 3, 1936 Morrison, Tennessee
- Died: July 2, 2007 (aged 71) Olympia Fields, Illinois
- Areas: Cartoonist, Writer, Artist
- Notable works: Playboy cartoons (1963–2007)

Robert "Buck" Brown (February 3, 1936 – July 2, 2007) was an American painter and cartoonist best known for creating Playboy magazine's toothless, saggy-breasted, highly-sexed, naughty "Granny" character.

== Early life and education ==
Brown was born in Morrison, Tennessee, in the 1930s and moved to Chicago as a child after the separation of his parents. He graduated from Englewood High School in 1954 and then joined the United States Air Force. While he was in the Air Force, he became known among his fellow airmen for the cartoons and pin-ups he would hang in the barracks. Brown later received a Bachelor of Arts degree in fine arts from the University of Illinois 1966.

== Playboy career ==
A Playboy Buck Brown cartoon used on a subscription form for the magazine in 1972.

One day while Brown was taking art classes and driving a Chicago Transit Authority Bus, he stopped by the Playboy Offices in Chicago to submit some ideas and sketches which ran the next year. Brown's first cartoon in Playboy, a black-and-white drawing of a boy holding a trumpet, ran in 1962. "Granny" was his first color work for the magazine published in 1966. His inspiration for the granny character came from people he would sketch during his hours driving the route and encountering situations that occurred on his bus: often, he noted, older women would board the bus and ask questions that could be interpreted as double entendre, such as, "Do you go down?" and "Do you go all the way?" In all, Brown had more than 600 cartoons published by the magazine.

== Other works and interests ==
Brown also had thousands of other drawings published by publications such as Esquire, Ebony and Jet. Many of his cartoons were filled with commentary on civil rights issues affecting African Americans. He created several album covers for the Chiaroscuro Jazz Record label, including The Red Holloway Quintet's Standing Room Only, Frank Wess Quartet's Surprise, Surprise, Jay McShann's My Baby With The Black Dress On and A Lindy Hop Compilation. Brown was also a painter of what he described as "soul genre paintings" depicting humorous images of everyday life. Brown's daughter, Tracy Hill recalls that the Bill Cosby once bought one of his paintings.
