= Billy Ireland =

American cartoonist

- Billy Ireland at The Columbus Dispatch
- Born: William Addison Ireland; 1880 Chillicothe, Ohio
- Died: May 29, 1935 (aged 54–55) Ohio
- Area: Cartoonist
- Notable works: The Passing Show

William Addison Ireland (1880 – May 29, 1935), a native of Chillicothe, Ohio, was a self-taught cartoonist well known throughout Ohio. The Billy Ireland Cartoon Library & Museum was named in his honor in 2009.

== Career ==
Shortly after his 1898 high school graduation, Ireland was hired by The Columbus Dispatch in Columbus, Ohio. Ireland worked his entire life for the Dispatch, drawing four to seven editorial cartoons each week in addition to his weekly feature, The Passing Show.

Ireland was best known for The Passing Show, which debuted on February 9, 1908, with its title inspired by George Lederer's The Passing Show (1894), the first successful American revue-format entertainment. In Ireland's full-page color Sunday strip, he commented on everything from local politics and visiting celebrities to the trials and tribulations of the Ohio State University football team. For the September 30, 1923 Passing Show page, Ireland created a character inspired by Ohio State's 1902 school song, "Carmen Ohio". The Passing Show came to an end on June 2, 1935, the Sunday following his death on May 29.

== Legacy ==
Comic strip historian Allan Holtz commented:

The feature was a much-beloved fixture of the Sunday Dispatch, both for its graphic inventiveness (the mastheads alone are worth the price of admission) and all the local color. Ireland seemingly knew everyone and everything in Columbus, and he lovingly lampooned it all each Sunday. The pages were always jam-packed... filled to the brim with local happenings, oddball news and personal anecdotes... The creator took a vacation every summer, during which substitutes would be called upon to keep the Show rolling, as it were... Billy Ireland was noted for his kindnesses to aspiring cartoonists. He was Dudley Fisher's mentor in the 1910s, and later gave Milton Caniff his first pro cartooning job at the Dispatch. Noel Sickles also acknowledges a great debt to Ireland for giving him early encouragement. After Ireland's death The Passing Show was continued by Harry Keys, who renamed it We Folks in 1938. Others who took a crack at the Ireland legacy page were Bob Vittur and Myron Dixon. As We Folks, the feature ran until at least 1944.

This detail from Billy Ireland's The Passing Show (September 30, 1923) color Sunday page displays a character inspired by Ohio State's school song, "Carmen Ohio", written in 1902.

In 2003, his work was exhibited at Ohio State University's Cartoon Library & Museum, since renamed the Billy Ireland Cartoon Library & Museum. Another exhibition of Ireland's work was mounted in 2010, as announced by the Museum's founding curator, Lucy Shelton Caswell:

Billy Ireland was a Columbus celebrity during his lifetime. He enjoyed a national reputation, and his work is still delightful to read. This is a fitting honor for a great cartoonist. We look forward to sharing his work with a new generation of readers... Few Ohioans have celebrated their affection for their home state as consistently and creatively as cartoonist Billy Ireland. William Addison Ireland was a child of rural Ohio. He remembered this geography in his art, reflected this point of view in his editorial cartoons, and refused to abandon his Ohio roots for the increased money and fame that might have been his had he worked in New York or Chicago.

The Elizabeth Ireland Graves Foundation is managed by the cartoonist's granddaughter, Sayre Graves. In September 2009, it was announced that the Ohio State University Board of Trustees approved a new name, Billy Ireland Cartoon Library & Museum, in recognition of a $7 million gift from the Elizabeth Ireland Graves Foundation to support the renovation of the University's Sullivant Hall. The $20.6 million project was completed in 2013, and the Sullivant Hall houses both the Billy Ireland Cartoon Library and Museum and Ohio State's Department of Dance.

While at the Dispatch, Ireland mentored notable cartoonists Dudley Fisher, Milton Caniff and Ray Evans.

== Books ==
Some of his work is collected in Lucy Caswell's book, Billy Ireland, first published by the Museum in 1980 and expanded in a 2008 edition. Promoting the book, Caswell gave a January 24, 2008, lecture which was reviewed by J. Caleb Mozzocco:

Each Passing Show had a unique title strip across the top, with the words The Passing Show, “by” and a shamrock representing Ireland, all arranged into little scenes, like the letters all playing baseball or football, or forming a bridge, or baby birds in a nest, or captured German soldiers or whatever. Below that would be a dozen or so little mini-features or cartoons. There were more or less regular features within the page, like one-panel strip The Jedge and Jerry and caricatures highlighting local people and their interests and accomplishments, but the bulk of the page were standalone text and cartoon pieces dealing with nature, corn on the cob, OSU football, city politics, fashion and whatever the hell Ireland felt like drawing that week. The dozen or two little pieces didn’t really interact with one another, and Caswell said the page was designed to be read over the course of the day, with some people returning to it throughout their reading experience, while others sat there and read the whole thing. Appearing fairly regularly was Ireland himself. Not just as the shamrock-headed caricature in the title panel, but also as a little, fat white-haired guy in a janitor’s outfit; the page was his page, and he saw himself as in charge of its maintenance.

== See also ==
Detail from Billy Ireland's The Passing Show (January 20, 1929)

- Noel Sickles, another comic strip artist from Chillicothe, Ohio

== Listen to ==
- "Carmen Ohio"
