= Draper Hill =

American cartoonist and writer

Draper Hill (1935 – May 13, 2009) was an American cartoonist and writer.

He was educated at Harvard University and from 1958 until 1964 he worked as a reporter and cartoonist for The Patriot Ledger. He was also the editorial cartoonist for the Memphis Commercial Appeal (1971 -1976) and the Detroit News (1976-1999).

== Works ==
- Cartoon and Caricature from Hogarth to Hoffnung (1962).
- Mr. Gillray: The Caricaturist, A Biography (1965).
- Fashionable Contrasts: Caricatures by James Gillray (1966).
- The Satirical Etchings of James Gillray (1976).
- (with John Adler), Doomed by Cartoon: How Cartoonist Thomas Nast and the New York Times Brought Down Boss Tweed and His Ring of Thieves (2008).
