= Lucy Shelton Caswell =

Lucy Shelton Caswell (born 1944) is an American scholar focusing on cartoons and comics. She is known for her role as the founder and longtime curator of the Billy Ireland Cartoon Library & Museum at the Ohio State University.

== Early life and education ==
Lucy Shelton Caswell was born in 1944 and grew up in Brownwood, Texas.

She studied history and German at Austin College, graduating in 1966. She then completed graduate studies in library science at the University of Michigan.

== Career ==
As a researcher and professor, Caswell has focused on cartoons, including comics and political cartoons.

In 1970, she was hired at the Ohio State University to teach and to oversee the school's Journalism Library. There, in 1977, she became the founding curator of the university's Billy Ireland Cartoon Library & Museum.

As a curator, she has overseen more than 75 exhibitions about cartoons. She worked to incorporate major donations of art archives into the Cartoon Library's collection, which became the largest accumulation of cartoon art in the world.

In 2010, she retired from her longtime role at the library. However, she returned part-time to work on special projects.

Caswell was the founding editor of Inks: The Journal of the Comics Studies Society. She has co-edited the Studies in Cartoons and Comics series for the Ohio State University Press. Also, she has edited and written various books, including a 2007 overview of the American cartoonist Billy Ireland.

She has been heavily involved in organizing the annual Cartoon Crossroads Columbus event. Her board memberships have included the Charles M. Schulz Museum and Research Center and the Library of Congress' Swann Foundation.

The National Cartoonists Society honored Caswell with its Silver T-Square Award for 2010. In 2025, she was inducted into the Will Eisner Award Hall of Fame.
