= Signe Wilkinson =

American cartoonist (born 1950)

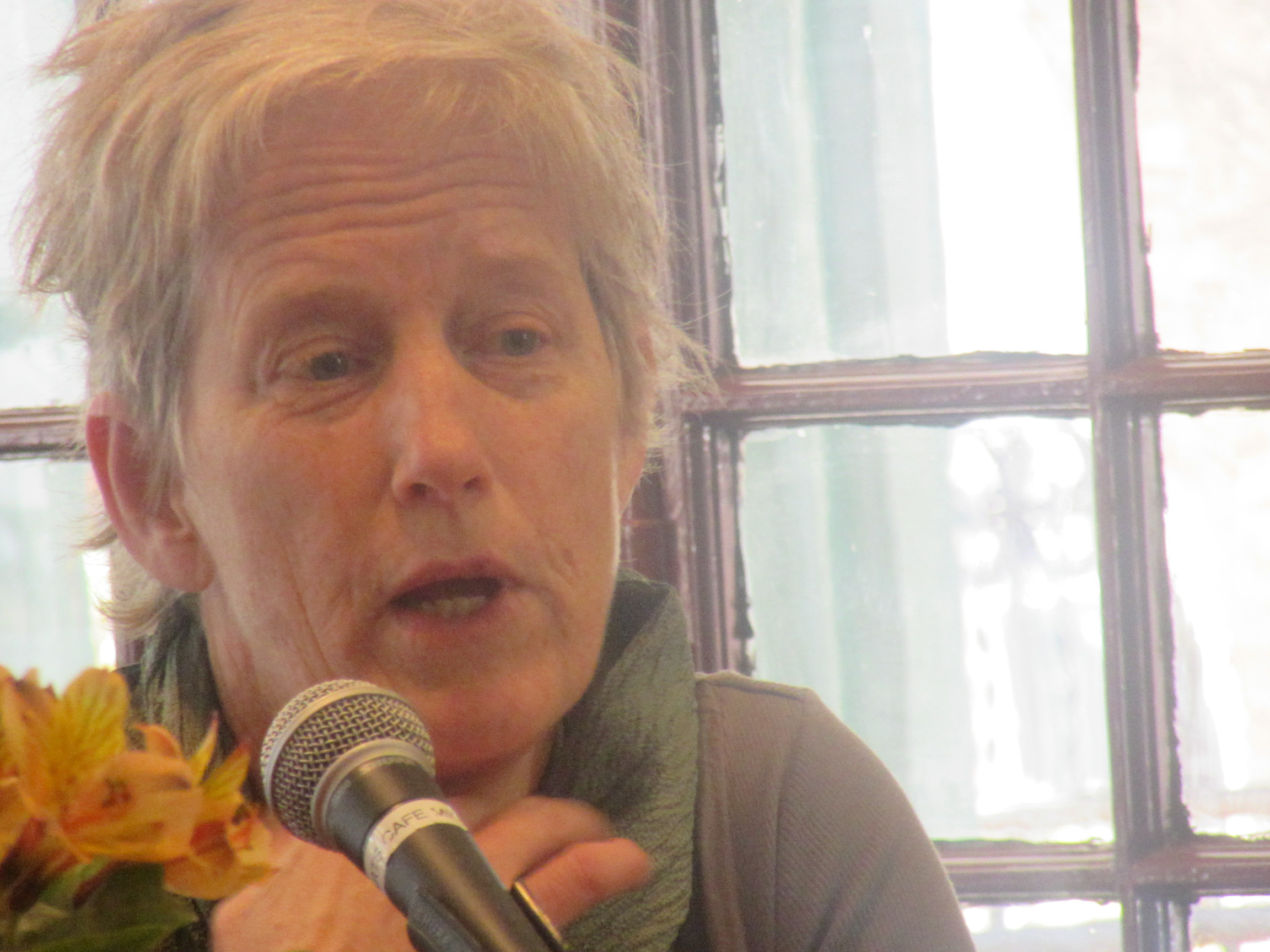
- Wilkinson, photographed in 2015.
- Born: July 25, 1950 (age 76) Wichita Falls, Texas, U.S.
- Area: Cartoonist
- Notable works: Editorial cartoons One Nation, Under Surveillance; Abortion Cartoons on Demand
- Awards: Pulitzer Prize - Editorial Cartooning

Signe Wilkinson (born July 25, 1950, in Wichita Falls, Texas) is an editorial cartoonist best known for her work at the Philadelphia Daily News. Her work is described as having a "unique style and famous irreverence." Wilkinson is the only female editorial cartoonist whose work has been distributed by a major syndicate.

Wilkinson is the first female cartoonist to win the Pulitzer Prize for Editorial Cartooning (1992) and was once named "the Pennsylvania state vegetable substitute" by the former speaker of the Pennsylvania House of Representatives. In 2011, Wilkinson received a Visionary Woman Award from Moore College of Art & Design. She has also won four Overseas Press Club Awards and two Robert F. Kennedy Journalism Awards for Cartooning.

In late 2020, Wilkinson retired as the editorial cartoonist for The Philadelphia Inquirer and the Philadelphia Daily News. She still publishes cartoons in Sunday editions of the Inquirer.

== Biography ==
=== Early life and education ===
Wilkinson was born into a Quaker family in Wichita Falls, Texas, on July 25, 1950. She received a Bachelor of Arts in English at the University of Denver. She then attended the Pennsylvania Academy of the Fine Arts; to support herself, she worked with graphic design at the Academy of Natural Sciences, and various regional newspapers hired her as a stringer.

=== Career ===
After Wilkinson received her BA in English, she began to pursue careers in journalism. She worked as a reporter, stringing for the Daily Post, the King of Prussia, and the West Chester Daily Local News. She also worked for the Quakers and the Academy of Natural Sciences of Drexel University before working for a housing project in Cyprus. This job shortly ended due to a coup d'état in Cyprus, followed by a military invasion from Turkey. Once Wilkinson returned to reporting, she would draw the people she reported on.

Realizing her interest in both art and politics, Wilkinson attended the Pennsylvania Academy of Fine Arts for a year. During her time there, she stringed for various Philadelphia and New York publications. In 1982, she earned a full-time job at the San Jose Mercury News, where she spent three and a half years working as a cartoonist. In the mid-1980s, Wilkinson worked for the Philadelphia Daily News as a cartoonist, where she still draws five cartoons a week. In 1992, she became the first woman to win the Pulitzer Prize for Editorial Cartooning. The same year, she released her first collection of cartoons, Abortion Cartoons on Demand. Wilkinson has also created cartoons for Working Woman, Ms., Organic Gardening, the Institute for Research on Higher Education and several other publications, such as the Friends Journal and the University Barge Club newspaper.

In 1992, she published her first collection of her work, entitled Abortion Cartoons on Demand. In 2005, she released her second collection of cartoons, One Nation, Under Surveillance: Cartoon Rants on Life, Liberty and the Pursuit of Privacy.

She served as president of the Association of American Editorial Cartoonists from 1994 to 1995.

On November 21, 2007, Wilkinson launched a syndicated daily comic strip with United Media entitled Family Tree. This strip focused on environmental issues. Family Tree concluded on August 27, 2011. For Organic Gardening magazine, Wilkinson created a comic strip entitled Shrubbery that centered on botanical and political topics. The Washington Post Writers Group syndicated Wilkinson's cartoons.

== Personal life ==
Wilkinson and her husband live in Pennsylvania with their two birds, five goldfish, and a dog named "Ginger."

== Awards ==
- 1991: Clifford K. and James T. Berryman Award for Editorial Cartooning
- 1992: Pulitzer Prize for Editorial Cartooning
- 1996: Overseas Press Club Award- Thomas Nast Award
- 2000: Overseas Press Club Award- Thomas Nast Award
- 2002: Robert F. Kennedy Journalism Award- Cartoon
- 2006: Overseas Press Club Award- Thomas Nast Award
- 2008: Robert F. Kennedy Journalism Award- Cartoon
- 2011: Visionary Woman Award from Moore College of Art & Design
- 2013: Aronson Award for Cartooning- Cartooning with a Conscience
- 2014: Overseas Press Club Award- Thomas Nast Award

== Notable works ==
- Abortion Cartoons on Demand (Cartoonist Group, 1992)
- One Nation, Under Surveillance: Cartoon Rants on Life, Liberty and the Pursuit of Privacy (Cartoonist Group, 2005)
- Illustrations for Mike McGrath's Book of Compost by Mike McGrath (Sterling, 2006)
- Illustrations for You Bet Your Tomatoes by Mike McGrath (reissued in 2008)
- Illustrations for Joe Sixpack's Philly Beer Guide by Don Russell (Camino Books, 2008)
- Contributor to cartoon collection of Sex and Sensibility: Ten Women Examine the Lunacy of Modern Love in 200 Cartoons (Twelve, 2008)
- Family Tree with United Media (November 21, 2007 – August 27, 2011)
- Shrubbery for Organic Gardening
