= Dave Strickler =

Librarian and indexer

Dave Strickler (born 1944) is an American reference librarian noted for his compilation of Syndicated Comic Strips and Artists, 1924–1995: The Complete Index, regarded as a major reference work by researchers and historians of newspaper comic strips.

== Biography ==
Born in Iowa, Strickler holds degrees from the University of Florida, Georgetown University and Florida State University. Prior to earning a library degree in 1988, Strickler was involved in linguistics, hotel management, entertainment coordination at Walt Disney World and professional gambling. Since 1988, he has been employed as a reference librarian at the University of Southern California, a library automation specialist in Provo, Utah and Emeryville, California, an abstracter/indexer of nursing journals, a motel owner/operator and, since retirement, an editor of financial documents and a lower brass musician.

== Work ==
=== Compilation and indexing ===
Syndicated Comic Strips and Artists, 1924-1995: The Complete Index, published by Strickler's Comics Access in 1995, is a comprehensive compilation of American newspaper comic strips. Covering more than 4700 syndicated strips and panels, it is the largest single listing of comic strips ever compiled. The alphabetical list of strips gives dates of syndication, along with names of individuals associated with the strips. A separate section displays an alphabetical list of 3300 artists, writers and creators, providing the titles of strips each worked on with dates of their work. Another section offers a translation of nicknames and pseudonyms.

Strickler's main source of information was the Syndicate Directory published by Editor & Publisher (with the exception of the World War II years 1943 and 1944). His introduction explains how he began the project in 1992:

Joe Btfsplk is to blame for this whole thing. Joe was the dismal source of woe and depression who slunk through Li'l Abner's Dogpatch, spreading misery in every direction. I was a novice reference librarian at the University of Southern California (USC) in 1992, and pretty cocky about my research abilities when a lady called, wanting to know how to spell Joe's last name. No problem, I thought. Joe's spelling took several hours to track down, however, and in the course of that long, dusty (eventually successful) hunt I realized that no substantive index of comic strips and characters existed, either at USC or anywhere else. USC's library held two well-known encyclopedias on comics but nothing like the exhaustive indexes available in other areas of the humanities. Properly intimidated at the time by the publish-or-perish world of the untenured faculty librarian, I thought that such an index, a compilation of all comic strips ever published in the United States, and their major characters (to assist the next librarian who needed to spell Btfsplk) might make an interesting and academically acceptable publication, not to mention that it would chink up a gap in the reference literature. I was, however, pragmatical enough to realize that a work of this comprehensivity would pretty much take the rest of my life. That project continues on even as we speak, with USC and tenure concerns long forgotten, and is beyond the scope of this work. Give me a few more years.

=== Online comic strip database ===
Strickler, who lives and works near William Randolph Hearst's castle in San Simeon, California, maintains an online searchable index of comic strips in the Los Angeles Times from 1904 to the present (August, 2011). One can search by title or by artist. Kevin Roderick's influential blog LA Observed described the database in the August 21, 2008 posting "Every comic, ever, in the LAT":

Dave Strickler, a former USC research librarian, has painstakingly compiled an online database listing the run years and some details of every comic strip to appear in the Los Angeles Times from August 21, 1904 Buster Brown) to the current era. It stands, he says, as the closest thing to a guide to full runs of comics in U.S. newspapers. He's now working on a database of comic strip characters.

Strickler explained: “The United States has five major national newspapers with long back runs widely available nationwide in microfilm. Three of these newspapers have never carried comics (The New York Times, The Wall Street Journal, The Christian Science Monitor), and one has carried comics only sporadically (The Washington Post). That leaves the Los Angeles Times as the only newspaper with comics in the United States with a long back run that is widely available.”

In addition, Strickler maintains a separate but unpublished index of approximately 8100 U.S. comic strips, encompassing the comics from Editor & Publisher, the Los Angeles Times and every other source discovered in 20 years of research.

=== Character index ===
Strickler has compiled, but not made public, an index of nearly 36,000 comic strip characters.

== See also ==
- Bill Blackbeard
- Allan Holtz

== Sources ==
- Harvey, Robert C. "Review," Inks, vol. 4, no. 1, pp. 41-47. February 1997.
