= Tom Spurgeon =

American comic writer (1968–2019)

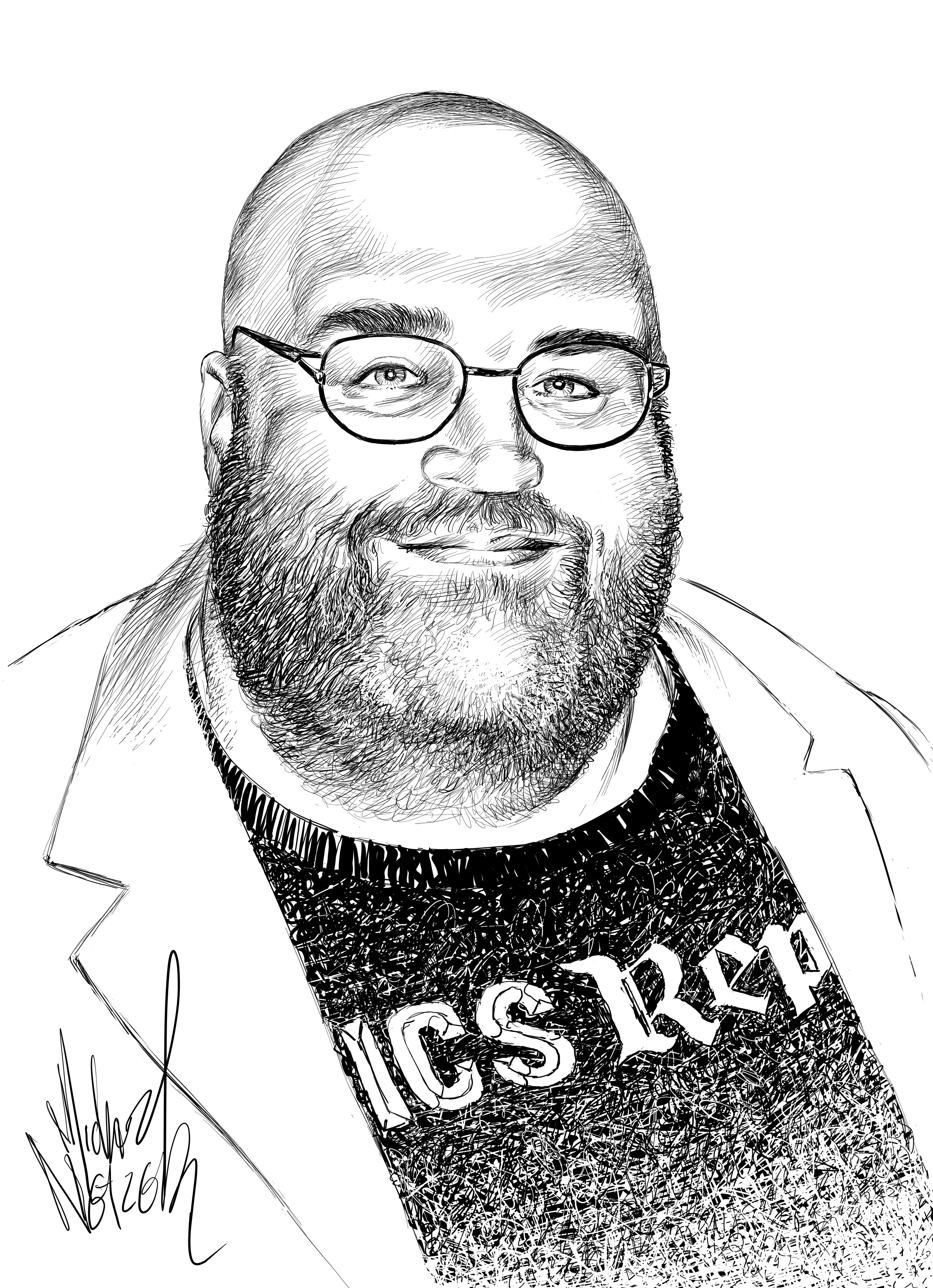
- Tom Spurgeon by Michael Netzer
- Born: December 16, 1968 Muncie, Indiana, U.S.
- Died: November 13, 2019 (aged 50) Columbus, Ohio, U.S.
- Areas: Writer, journalist, historian
- Notable works: The Comics Reporter
- Awards: Best Comics-Related Periodical/Journalism, Eisner Award (2010, 2012, 2013)

Thomas Martin Spurgeon (December 16, 1968 – November 13, 2019) was an American writer, historian, critic, and editor in the field of comics, notable for his five-year run as editor of The Comics Journal and his blog The Comics Reporter.

== Early life ==
Spurgeon was born on December 16, 1968, in Muncie, Indiana. He was one of three sons of Sandra "Sunny" McFarren and Wiley W. Spurgeon Jr. His mother was a senior manager in the health care industry, and his father was the executive editor of the sister newspapers The Muncie Star and The Muncie Evening Press, a role that included curating the newspapers' comics pages.

Spurgeon was his class president in high school, and attended college at Washington and Lee University in Lexington, Virginia, where he was a lineman on the football team, and graduated with a BA in History and Politics in 1991. He spent the next two years in Evanston, Illinois, studying at the Garrett–Evangelical Theological Seminary before leaving in 1993.

== Career ==
Spurgeon was the managing editor, and later executive editor, of The Comics Journal, a comics trade magazine and critical journal published by Fantagraphics, from 1994 to 1999. Under his tenure, the magazine expanded the scope of its coverage to more regularly include European comics, introducing an English-language readership to the new wave of publishing from France led by the group of cartoonists centered around L'Association. As well, Spurgeon's Journal was notable for the coverage it gave to burgeoning scenes of American comics makers like the Fort Thunder collective.

After leaving The Comics Journal, Spurgeon wrote the comic strip Wildwood with his childhood friend Dan Wright. The strip, initially launched as Bobo's Progress, was syndicated by King Features from 1999 to 2002 and ran in about 80 newspapers.

With Jordan Raphael, Spurgeon co-wrote the biography Stan Lee and the Rise and Fall of the American Comic Book (Chicago Review Press, 2003). He was also the coauthor of The Romita Legacy (Dynamite, 2011).

In 2004, with site designer Jordan Raphael, Spurgeon launched The Comics Reporter.

Spurgeon co-authored a history of his former employer, Fantagraphics. Written with Jacob Covey, Comics as Art: We Told You So was initially scheduled for release in 2006. However, a defamation lawsuit launched by Harlan Ellison against Fantagraphics, claiming they had defamed him in the book, saw publication delayed. The book was released, with references to Ellison omitted, in 2017.

In 2014, Spurgeon became the executive director of Cartoon Crossroads Columbus, an annual free four-day celebration of cartooning and graphic novels in Columbus, Ohio.

== Personal life ==
Spurgeon described himself as "a big, fat guy", standing at six feet three inches tall and weighing at times over 400 pounds. In 2011, he underwent emergency surgery that placed The Comics Reporter website on hiatus. He wrote an essay about the experience. A year later, he posted a second essay detailing his change in perspective, lifestyle modifications, and significant weight loss following his surgery. In it, he explains, "I wasn't sick because I was overweight. The weight was a factor in my recovery...My desire to lose weight greatly intensified because of the new health realities I faced."

Spurgeon died on November 13, 2019, at age 50, in Columbus, Ohio.

== Awards ==
Spurgeon and The Comics Reporter won the Eisner Award for Best Comics-Related Periodical/Journalism in 2010, 2012, and 2013. The site was also awarded the UTNE Independent Press Award for arts and literature coverage in 2002. Spurgeon sat on the 2019 Ringo Awards Professional Jury.

== Bibliography ==
- (with Jordan Raphael) Stan Lee and the Rise and Fall of the American Comic Book (Chicago Review Press, 2003) ISBN 978-1556525063
- The Romita Legacy (Dynamite Entertainment, 2011) ISBN 978-1933305271
- (with Jacob Covey) Comics As Art: We Told You So (Fantagraphics Books, 2016) ISBN 978-1606999332
