= M.G. Lord =

American author (born 1955)

Mary G. Lord (born November 18, 1955) is an American author, cultural critic, and investigative journalist. She was a political cartoonist and columnist for Newsday. She is an associate professor of the practice of English at the University of Southern California.

She produces the podcast, LA Made: The Barbie Tapes with Antonia Cereijido.

== Early life and education ==
Lord was born in 1955 and grew up in southern California. Her father was a rocket engineer and her mother, although a chemistry graduate, "quit work to keep house for my father".

Lord has a BA (1977) in politics, the graphic arts and letters from Yale University and an MFA (2016) in writing from Vermont College of Fine Arts. While a student, she was a cartoonist for the Yale Daily News. After graduating, she worked drawing political cartoons for the Wall Street Journal, then the Chicago Tribune, and then moved to Newsday.

== Books ==
- The Accidental Feminist: How Elizabeth Taylor Raised Our Consciousness and We Were Too Distracted by Her Beauty to Notice (2012) (about Elizabeth Taylor)
- Astro Turf: The Private Life of Rocket Science (2005)
- Forever Barbie: The Unauthorized Biography of a Real Doll. New York: William Morrow. 1994. (About the Barbie doll)
- Mean Sheets: Political Cartoons by M.G. Lord (1982)

=== Book chapters ===
- Lord, M.G. (2012). "Cold Warrior's Daughter". In Westwick, Peter J. (ed.). Blue sky metropolis: the aerospace century in Southern California. Berkeley, Calif: University of California Press [u.a.] ISBN 978-0-87328-249-9.
