= Allan Holtz =

Comic strip historian

Allan Holtz (/hɔːlts/) is an American comic strip historian who researches and writes about newspaper comics for his Stripper's Guide blog, launched in 2005. His research encompasses some 7,000 American comic strips and newspaper panels. In addition to his contributions to Hogan's Alley and other publications about vintage comic strips, he is the author of American Newspaper Comics: An Encyclopedic Reference Guide (2012). He is a resident of Tavares, Florida.

== Work ==
Holtz's blog Stripper's Guide posts such regular series as "News of Yore" (including news items from back issues of Editor & Publisher), "Obscurity of the Day" (little-known strips) and a series on George Herriman. One such obscurity discussed by Holtz is The Captain's Gig, a little-known strip by Virgil Partch; it ran as a daily and Sunday from 1977 to 1979. Other obscurities rediscovered by Holtz go back to the earliest published comic strips. He also surveys the history of comic strip syndicates, along with the detailed information he provides on writers and artists. In a 2002 issue of Hogan's Alley, Holtz wrote about his almost accidental discovery in a microfilmed archive of The Pittsburgh Leader of F. E. Johnson's Bobby the Boy Scout, which Holtz traced back to August 21, 1911, and regards as the very first serious adventure comic.

Maynard Frank Wolfe (Rube Goldberg Inventions) praised Holtz as "the extraordinary collector conservator computer wizard and historian of cartoon art."

== Books ==
Holtz is also a contributor to NBM's Forever Nuts: Classic Screwball Strips series, writing biographical introductions for the volumes on Frederick Opper and Bud Fisher, and creating annotations for Bringing Up Father and other strips reprinted in this series.

His 600-page American Newspaper Comics: An Encyclopedic Reference Guide (ISBN 978-0-472-11756-7), previously available as a subscription CD service, was published by the University of Michigan Press in 2012.

== See also ==
- Nicholson Baker
- Bill Blackbeard
- Comic Art
- Woody Gelman
- List of newspaper comic strips
- Dave Strickler
- List of comic strip syndicates
- The Sunday Funnies
