= 1989 in comics =

Notable events of 1989 in comics.

== Events ==
=== Year overall ===
- The "Inferno" company-wide Marvel Comics crossover continues, involving the mutant titles The Uncanny X-Men, X-Factor, The New Mutants, and Excalibur, as well as the X-Terminators limited series and various other Marvel titles. Began in Marvel titles cover-dated October 1988; runs through issues cover-dated August 1989.
- DC Comics debuts its alternative imprint Piranha Press, rolling out such series as Beautiful Stories for Ugly Children, Epicurus the Sage, Etc., Gregory, and The Score; and the original graphic novels Desert Streams, The Sinners, and The Wastelands.
- Caliber Comics, Continüm Comics, Revolutionary Comics, and Trident Comics make their publishing debuts; Blackthorne Publishing, Comics Interview Group, Starblaze Graphics, and the UK publisher Harrier Comics all cease publishing.
- "The Man Who Falls," by Dennis O'Neil and Dick Giordano, published in Secret Origins of the World's Greatest Super-Heroes trade paperback. (DC Comics)
- NOW Comics decided to use the Comics Code Authority seal in that year.
- Dragon Ball Z is created by Shōnen Jump as a separate series to the original Dragon Ball

=== January ===
- January 27: Belgian comic artist Marc Sleen is named a Knight in the Crown Order.
- Ronald Perelman buys the Marvel Entertainment Group, the parent company of Marvel Comics, from New World Entertainment for $82.5 million, putting in $10.5 million of his own money and borrowing the rest.
- Invasion! crossover event in DC Comics

=== February ===
- Doom Patrol vol. 2, #19: "Crawling from the Wreckage" — Grant Morrison begins a celebrated run as Doom Patrol writer (lasting until issue #63, January 1993).
- Gotham by Gaslight, by Brian Augustyn, Mike Mignola, and P. Craig Russell, published by DC Comics.
- Justice League International #24 features the final Bonus Book, a free insert showcasing the work of new comics creators.
- Thor #400: "God vs. god in the greatest battle of all time," mostly written by Tom DeFalco. (Marvel Comics)
- The Avengers #300: 68-page Inferno crossover by Walter Simonson, John Buscema, and Tom Palmer. (Marvel Comics)

=== March ===
- March 4: The merger of Time Inc. and Warner Communications is announced.
- March 14: Action Comics, with issue #642, ends its weekly publication schedule (begun May 24, 1988) and goes on a short hiatus (resuming publication in July). (DC Comics)
- Morte di una star by Claudio Nizzi and Gustavo Trigo (Bonelli) ; debut of the journalist Violet McGraw, Nick Raider’s love interest.

=== April ===
- April 1: Hanco Kolk and Peter de Wit's riddle comic Inspecteur Netjes makes its debut.
- April 14: The final episode of Jim Davis' U.S. Acres is published.
- April 16: The first episode of Scott Adams' Dilbert is printed.
- April 30: Near Paris the theme park Parc Astérix opens its doors, based on the comic strip Astérix.
- Dragon's Claws is canceled by Marvel UK with issue #10.
- Wanderers is canceled by DC with issue #13.
- Africa, by Guido Nolitta and Luca Dell’Uomo (Bonelli) ; Mister No leaves the Amazon for a "transfer" to Africa, which will last until October 1991.

=== May ===
- Detective Comics #600 by Sam Hamm, Denys Cowan, Dick Giordano, and Frank McLaughlin. (DC Comics)
- The Janus Directive crossover storyline begins. (DC Comics)
- Justice League International changes its name to Justice League America with issue #26 (DC Comics).
- Dragon Ball Z May 10; First Tankoben Volume (Shōnen Jump)

=== June ===
- June 21: The final issue of the Flemish comics magazine 't Kapoentje is published.
- June 28: The first issue of the Flemish comics magazine De Jommekeskrant is published, a supplement of Het Volk.
- Atlantis Attacks crossover event in Marvel Comics, runs through Marvel's core title Annuals.
- Maze Agency ceases publication by Comico with issue #7.

=== July ===
- Action Comics, with issue #643, goes back to being a standard format monthly title. (DC Comics)
- The introduction of the Great Lakes Avengers in issue #46 of West Coast Avengers. (Marvel Comics)

=== August ===
- Batman: Year Three storyline, by Marv Wolfman and Pat Broderick, begins in Batman #436 (runs through Batman #439). (DC Comics)
- Legion of Super-Heroes vol. 2 is canceled by DC with issue #63.
- C.O.P.S.is cancelled by DC with issue #15.
- St. Swithin's Day, by Grant Morrison and Paul Grist, debuts in Trident #1. (Continues through issue #4; collected by Trident Comics as a trade paperback in 1990.)

=== September ===
- West Coast Avengers changes its name to Avengers West Coast with issue #48.
- Death's Head is cancelled by Marvel UK with issue #10.
- In Sandman #8 (DC comics), the cycles The doll’s house begins.

=== October ===
- October 3: Adam Thrasher launches his comic strip Space Moose. It will run until 1999.
- October 6: The Belgian Comic Strip Center in Brussels opens its doors.
- October 27: Bill Watterson gives a lecture about The Cheapening of the Comics at Ohio State University, which explains his views on commercialism. The speech polarizes audiences.
- October 28: The Dead Man storyline, by John Wagner and John Ridgway, begins in 2000 AD prog 650 (running through prog 662, 20 January 1990). (Fleetway Publications)
- October 29: In The Hague Theo van den Boogaard receives the Stripschapprijs. Ron Abram, chief editor of Algemeen Dagblad, receives the Jaarprijs voor Bijzondere Verdienste (nowadays the P. Hans Frankfurtherprijs).
- Arkham Asylum: A Serious House on Serious Earth, by Grant Morrison and Dave McKean, published by DC Comics.
- Daniel Clowes launches his comic book series Eightball. In the first issue his comics series Like a Velvet Glove Cast in Iron and Pussey! are prepublished.

=== November ===
- In issue #3 of the magazine Hup, Robert Crumb draws a satirical comic, targeting Donald Trump.The same month, Martim Mystere meets the businessman in the album Condominium by Alfredo Castelli and Gianni Crivello (Bonelli).
- Conan The King is cancelled with issue #55.

=== December ===
- December 26: in Uncle Scrooge Adventures #20, On a silver platter by Don Rosa.
- Acts of Vengeance crossover event in Marvel Comics; runs through February 1990 issues.
- G.I. Joe Special Missions is canceled by Marvel with issue #28.
- Maze Agency is picked up by Innovation Comics with issue #8.

=== Specific date unknown ===
- The final issue of the Belgian satirical comics and cartoons magazine Pourquoi pas? is published.
- The first episode of Barbara Brandon-Croft's Where I'm Coming From is published and will run until 2005.
- Belgian comic artist Bob Mau is knighted in the Order of the Belgian Crown.
- Joris Vermassen starts his absurd humor comic series Bob De Kerpel, published under the pseudonym Fritz Van den Heuvel.

== Deaths ==
=== January ===
- January 17: Malcolm Judge, British comics artist (Colonel Crackpot's Circus, The Numskulls, Billy Whizz), dies at age 70 or 71.
- January 23: Salvador Dalí, Spanish painter (his Les Mystères Surrealistes de New York was published as a comic strip), dies at age 84.
- January 31: Bob Dunn, American comics artist (continued They'll Do It Every Time and Little Iodine), dies at age 80.

=== February ===
- February 9: Osamu Tezuka, Japanese manga artist and animator (Astro Boy, Kimba the White Lion, Black Jack, Phoenix, Princess Knight, Unico, Message to Adolf, The Amazing 3, Buddha), dies at age 60.
- February 19: Athos Cozzi, Italian comics artist, dies at age 69.
- February 25: Ken Champin, American comics artist (Disney comics), dies at age 77.
- February 27: Peter Age Veldheer, Dutch comics artist (made comics starring Tarzan), dies at age 58.

=== March ===
- March 19: Ethel Hays, American comics artist (Ethel, Marianne, Vic and Ethel, Flapper Fanny Says, Raggedy Ann), dies at age 97.
- March 27: Fabrizio Caprioli, Italian comics artist, dies at age 40.
- March 30: Mike Sekowsky, American comics artist, writer and animator (Justice League of America, Wonder Woman), dies at age 65.

=== April ===
- April 9: Carl Wessler, American animator, comics artist and writer (Snazzy Rabbit, Señorita Juanita McMouse, Filbert Fox, Happy Daze, Atlas Comics, E.C. Comics, Harvey Comics), dies at age 75
- April 27: William Arthur Smith, American animation writer, comics artist and illustrator (Captain Cook of Scotland Yard, Race Keane, Yankee Eagle, Navy Section, The King, Red, White and Blue), dies at age 71.

=== May ===
- May 3: Edmundo Marculeta, aka Marcouleta, Marcouletta, Marcou, Boris Tunder, Spanish-French comics artist (Aventuras de Baron Thunder, Julio y Ricardo, Vengador del Mundo, Jim l'Eclair, Sandy le Petit Boucanier), dies at age 66.
- May 21: Buford Tune, American comics artist (Dotty Dripple), dies at age 82.

=== June ===
- June 4: Dik Browne, American comics artist and writer (Hägar the Horrible, Hi and Lois), dies at age 71.
- June 29: Mathieu Laville, French comic artist, dies at age 28 in a car accident.

=== July ===
- July 10: Jean-Michel Charlier, Belgian comics writer (Buck Danny, Barbe-Rouge, Blueberry, La Patrouille des Castors, L'oncle Paul), dies at age 64.
- July 12: Rodolphe Vincent, Canadian illustrator, novelist and comics artist (newspaper comic strip adaptations of swashbuckler novels), dies at age 84.
- July 27: Pietro Sartor, Italian comic artist (member of EsseGesse, co-creator of Captain Miki, Il Grande Blek, Comandante Mark, Kinowa and Alan Mistero), dies at age 62.

=== August ===
- August 3: Paolo Garretto, Italian caricaturist and comics artist, dies at age 86.
- August 4: Paul Murry, American animator, comics artist and writer (Buck O'Rue, Disney comics, created the Super Goof feature), dies at age 77.
- August 8: George Papp, American comics artist (co-creator of Green Arrow and Congo Bill, worked on Superman and Superboy), dies at age 73.

=== September ===
- September 26: Terence Wakefield, British comics artist (worked for Film Fun, continued their Laurel & Hardy comics), dies at age 78.

=== October ===
- October 12: Jay Ward, American animator and producer (Crusader Rabbit, Rocky & Bullwinkle, Dudley Do-Right, Peabody and Sherman, Hoppity Hooper, George of the Jungle, Tom Slick, Super Chicken), dies at age 69.
- October 14: Dale Connor, American comics artist (Mary Worth, assisted on Apple Mary), dies at age 85.
- October 18: Henk J. Rotgans, Dutch comics artist (Robbie en Ringo, Jop, Joep en... Jippie, Moppy Mal, De Razende Raket), dies at age 79.

=== November ===
- November 6: George Fett, American comics artist (Sniffy (later Norbert), dies at age 69.
- November 13: Zdravko Sulic, Serbian comics artist, dies at age 64.
- November 19: Sol Harrison, American comics executive (president of DC Comics), dies at 72.
- November 20: Sten Rinaldo, Swedish comics artist (Ba-Ba, Varför är Icander så glad?), dies at age 83.
- November 22: C.C. Beck, American comics artist (Captain Marvel), dies at age 79.
- November 22: José Guadalupe Cruz, Mexican comics writer and screenwriter (comics about El Santo), dies at age 72.
- November 24: Gordon Bess, American comics artist and writer (Redeye), dies at age 60.
- November 28: Ion Popescu-Gopo, Romanian comic artist and animator (Gopo's Little Man), dies at age 66.

=== December ===
- December 12: Suihō Tagawa, Japanese manga artist (Norakuro), dies at age 90.
- December 18: Henning Gantriis, Danish comics artist (Livets Gang i Lidenlund), dies at age 71.
- December 29: Hubert Levigne, Dutch illustrator and comic artist (Het Prentenboek van Jesus' Leven), dies at age 84.

=== Specific date unknown ===
- Nestor Gonzalez Fossat, Argentine comics artist (Jimmy y su Pupilo, Aventuras de Menucho, Firulete y Retacón, Goyito y Goyita), dies at age 80 or 81.
- Charles Kuhn, American comics artist (Grandma), dies at age 97.
- Karel van Milleghem, Belgian journalist and chief editor (Ons Volkske and the Dutch language version of Tintin, creator of the famous slogan Tintin, for people between 7 and 77, initiator of Belvision), dies at age 65 or 66.
- Marc Payot, Belgian actor and comics artist (Tom Potter, continued Het Manneken), dies at age 65 or 66 in a traffic accident.
- Stoian Venev, Bulgarian comics artist and caricaturist, dies at age 84 or 85.
- César López Vera, Spanish comics artist, dies at age 56 or 57.
- George Wheeler, American animator and comics artist (made a comic strip based on True Life Adventures, Disney comics), dies at age 69 or 70.
- Wittamin, Thai comics artist (LingGee), dies at age 71 or 72.

== Exhibitions and shows ==
- June 7–August 7: "The Original Art of Zap Comix #12" (Psychedelic Solution Gallery, New York City) — featuring the work of Gilbert Shelton, Robert Crumb, Robert Williams, S. Clay Wilson, Victor Moscoso, Spain Rodriguez, and Rick Griffin
- July 15–September 3: Frank Bellamy exhibition (The Basement Gallery, Brixton, South London, UK) — later exhibited at UKCAC '89
- October 15–November 26: "Great American Comics — 100 Years of American Cartoon Art" (part of the Festival of Cartoon Art) (Columbus Recreation and Parks Department's Cultural Arts Center, 139 W. Main St., Columbus, Ohio) — exhibition focusing on comics as a graphic narrative; Smithsonian Institution Traveling Exhibition Service show opens its two-year national tour
- October 16–November 30: "Women Practitioners of 'The Ungentlemanly Art'" (part of the Festival of Cartoon Art) (Philip Sills exhibit Hall, Ohio State University Main Library, 1858 Neil Ave. Mall, Columbus, Ohio) — seven women political cartoonists: Linda Boileau, Edwina Dumm, Etta Hulme, M.G. Lord, Lillian Mesner, Kate Palmer, and Signe Wilkinson

== Conventions ==
- Motor City Comic Con (Dearborn Civic Center) — first iteration of this show
- January: Angoulême International Comics Festival (Angoulême, France)
- Summer: Dragon Con (Omni Hotel & Convention Center, Atlanta, Georgia) — 3,200 attendees; guest of honor: Anne McCaffrey
- June: Heroes Convention (Charlotte, North Carolina)
- June 16–17: Comix Fair (Ramada Hotel Southwest, Houston, Texas) — seventh annual show; guests include John Romita, Jr., Bob Layton, Tim Vigil, and Doug Hazlewood
- June 30–July 2: Chicago Comicon (Ramada O'Hare, Rosemont, Illinois) — c. 5,000 attendees; guests include Jim Aparo, Stan Lee, Harvey Pekar, Jay Lynch, Skip Williamson, and S. Clay Wilson
- July 14–16: Dallas Fantasy Fair I (Sheraton Park Central, Dallas, Texas) — presentation of the Harvey Awards; official guests include Doug Hazlewood
- July 21–23: Atlanta Fantasy Fair (Atlanta Hilton & Towers, Atlanta, Georgia) — 4,000 attendees; official guests include George Pérez, Michael Dorn, Jerry Robinson, Gary Gygax, Todd Bryant, June Chadwick, Marc Singer, and Marina Sirtis (scheduled guests Bob Kane and Tom Savini forced to cancel)
- August 3–6: San Diego Comic-Con (Convention and Performing Arts Center and Omni Hotel) — 11,000 attendees; official guests: Paul Chadwick, Howard Cruse, Ron Goulart, Mark Hamill, Gilbert Hernandez and Jaime Hernandez, Selby Kelly, Syd Mead, Fred Rhoads, Jerry Robinson, and Gahan Wilson
- September 8–10: United Kingdom Comic Art Convention — guests include Jim Baikie, Grant Morrison, Jamie Delano, Kev F. Sutherland, John Ridgway, Dickie Howitt, Cam Kennedy, Guy Lawley, Will Simpson, Tim Perkins, Warren Pleece, Gary Pleece, Trina Robbins, Steve Yeowell, Steve Leialoha, Mark Farmer, Karen Berger, John Byrne, Jenette Kahn, Jaime Hernandez, Howard Chaykin, Woodrow Phoenix, Lew Stringer, Richard Bruning, David Lloyd, Susan Catherine, Barry Kitson, Mike Grell, Mark Buckingham, Tom Veitch, Gerhard, Gilbert Hernandez, Garry Leach, Steve Yeowell, Dave Gibbons, Phil Elliott, Myra Hancock, Paul Gravett, Eddie Campbell, Georgiou Bambos, Ed Pinsent, Glenn Dakin, Don Lawrence, Liam Sharp, Bill Marks, Archie Goodwin, Al Davison, Kevin O'Neill, Howard Chaykin, Dennis O'Neil, and Bryan Talbot
- September 9–10: FantaCon (Albany, New York)
- September 23–24: OrlandoCon (International Inn, Orlando, Florida) — 16th annual edition
- October 21–22: Toronto Comic and Sequential Art Exposition (Arts, Crafts and Hobbies Building, Exhibition Place, Toronto, Ontario, Canada)
- October 27–29: Festival of Cartoon Art (Ohio State University, Columbus, Ohio) — guests speakers included Sergio Aragonés, Tom Batiuk, John Berton, Bo Brown, Buck Brown, Sandy Campbell, Tee Collins, Will Eisner, Draper Hill, Etta Hulme, Lynn Johnston, John Lasseter, Tim Menees, David Wiley Miller, Richard S. Newcombe, Judith O'Sullivan, Mike Peters, Arnold Roth, Lee Salem, Jeff Stahler, Mark Alan Stamaty, Ed Stein, Don Stredney, Dana Summers, Robert W. Wagner, Mort Walker, Bill Watterson, Chris Wedge, and Richard Samuel West.
- November 24–26: Dallas Fantasy Fair II (Dallas, Texas)

== Awards ==
=== Eagle Awards ===
Presented in 1990 for comics published in 1989, distributed at the 1990 United Kingdom Comic Art Convention [UKCAC] by Paul Gambaccini and Dave Gibbons.

- Roll of Honour: 2000 AD
- Best International Comic Book: Akira

==== American Section ====
- Favourite Writer: Neil Gaiman, Sandman (DC Comics)
- Favourite Artist (Penciller): Todd McFarlane
- Favourite Artist (Inker): Paul Neary
- Favourite Comicbook: Uncanny X-Men
- Favourite Graphic Novel: Arkham Asylum
- Favourite Character: Batman
- Favourite Group or Team: Doom Patrol
- Favourite Villain: The Joker
- Favourite Single or Continued Story: Skreemer, written by Peter Milligan with art by Brett Ewins and Steve Dillon (DC Comics)
- Favourite New Comic Title: Batman: Legends of the Dark Knight
- Favourite Comic Cover: Aliens #1 by Denis Beauvais
- Favourite Specialist Comics Publication: Marvel Age

==== U.K. Section ====
- Favourite Writer: Grant Morrison
- Favourite Artist: Simon Bisley
- Favourite Comic: 2000 AD
- Best Graphic Novel: Violent Cases (Titan)
- Favourite Graphic Novel: Sláine: The Horned God Book I
- Favourite Character: Judge Dredd
- Favourite Villain: Judge Death
- Favourite Supporting Character: Middenface McNulty (Strontium Dog)
- Favourite Single or Continued Story: Sláine: The Horned God Book I (2000 AD Prog 626–635)
- Character Most Worthy of Own Title: Captain Britain
- Favourite New Comic: Bogey Man
- Favourite Comic Cover: 2000 AD Prog 626, by Simon Bisley
- Favourite Specialist Comics Publication: Speakeasy

=== Eisner Awards ===
No awards were presented in 1990, a transition year when Comic-Con International took over administration of the awards.

== First issues by title ==
=== DC Comics ===
Batman: Legends of the Dark Knight

Release: September. Writer: Dennis O'Neil. Artists: Ed Hannigan and John Beatty.

Beautiful Stories for Ugly Children

Release: June by Piranha Press. Writer: Dave Louapre. Artist: Dan Sweetman.

El Diablo vol. 2

Release: August. Writer: Gerard Jones. Artist: Mike Parobeck.

Huntress

Release: April. Writer: Joey Cavalieri. Artist: Joe Staton and Bruce Patterson.

Justice League Europe

Release: April. Writer: Keith Giffen and J. M. DeMatteis. Artists: Bart Sears and Pablo Marcos.

L.E.G.I.O.N.

Release: February. Writers: Alan Grant and Keith Giffen. Artists: Barry Kitson, Keith Giffen, and Mike DeCarlo.

Legion of Super-Heroes vol. 3

Release: November. Writers: Keith Giffen and Tom and Mary Bierbaum. Artists: Keith Giffen and Al Gordon.

New Gods vol. 3

Release: February. Writer: Mark Evanier. Artist: Paris Cullins.

The Sandman

Release: January. Writer: Neil Gaiman. Artists: Sam Kieth and Mike Dringenberg.

Star Trek vol. 2

Release: October. Writer: Peter David. Artists: James Fry and Arne Starr.

Star Trek: The Next Generation vol. 2

Release: October. Writer: Michael Jan Friedman. Artist: Pablo Marcos.

==== Limited series ====
Catwoman (4 issues)

Release: February. Writer: Mindy Newell. Artists: J.J. Birch and Michael Bair.

Epicurus the Sage (2 issues; #2 published in 1991)

Release: November by Piranha Press. Writer: William Messner-Loebs. Artist: Sam Kieth.

Hawkworld (3 issues)

Release: August. Writer/Artist: Tim Truman.

Invasion! (3 issues)

Release: January. Writers: Keith Giffen and Bill Mantlo. Artists: Keith Giffen and Todd McFarlane.

Justice, Inc. (2 issues)

Release: July. Writer: Andy Helfer. Artist: Kyle Baker.

Lex Luthor: The Unauthorized Biography (1 issue)

Release: May. Writer: James D. Hudnall. Artist: Eduardo Barreto.

Skreemer (6 issues)

Release: May. Writer: Peter Milligan. Artists: Brett Ewins and Steve Dillon.

=== Marvel Comics ===
Clive Barker's Hellraiser

Release: January by Epic Comics. Editor: Daniel Chichester.

Marc Spector: Moon Knight

Release: June. Writer: Chuck Dixon. Artists: Sal Velluto and Mark Farmer.

Nick Fury Agent of S.H.I.E.L.D.

Release: September. Writer: Bob Harras. Artists: Bob Hall and Kim DeMulder.

Nth Man: The Ultimate Ninja

Release: August. Writer: Larry Hama. Artists: Ron Wagner and Fred Fredericks.

Quasar

Release: October. Writer: Mark Gruenwald. Artists: Paul Ryan and Danny Bulanadi.

Sensational She-Hulk

Release: May. Writer/Artist: John Byrne

What If vol. 2

Release: July. Editor: Craig Anderson

==== Limited series ====
Damage Control (4 issues)

Release: May. Writer: Dwayne McDuffie. Artists: Ernie Colón and Bob Wiacek.

Shadowmasters (4 issues)

Release: October. Writer: Carl Potts. Artists: Dan Lawlis and Russ Heath.

The Sleeze Brothers (6 issues)

Release: June by Epic Comics. Writer: John Carnell. Artist: Andy Lanning.

The War (4 issues)

Release: June by New Universe. Writer: Doug Murray. Artist: Tom Morgan.

=== Independent and small press titles ===
- A1 (Atomeka Press, October)

The Adventures of Bayou Billy

Release: September by Archie Adventure Series. Writer: Rich Margopoulos. Artist: Amanda Conner.

- Baker Street (Caliber, March)
- Black Moon Chronicles (Zenda Editions, May)
- The Crow (Caliber, February)

Eightball

Release: August by Fantagraphics. Writer/Artist: Daniel Clowes.

- Fung Wan (Jonesky)
- The Green Hornet (NOW Comics, November)

Saviour

Release: December by Trident Comics. Writer: Mark Millar. Artists: Daniel Vallely and Nigel Kitching.

- Teenage Mutant Ninja Turtles Adventures (Archie Comics, March)

Trident

Release: August by Trident Comics. Editor: Martin Skidmore.

==== Limited series ====
Aliens (4 issues)

Release: August by Dark Horse Comics. Writer: Mark Verheiden. Artist: Denis Beauvais.

The Bogie Man (4 issues)

Release: September by Fat Man Press. Writer: John Wagner and Alan Grant. Artist: Robin Smith.

Squalor (4 issues)

Release: December by First Comics. Writer: Stefan Petrucha. Artist: Tom Sutton.

== Initial appearance by character name ==
=== DC Comics ===
- Anarky in Detective Comics #608 (November)
- Amadeus Arkham in Arkham Asylum: A Serious House on Serious Earth (October)
- Arm Fall Off Boy in Secret Origins vol. 2 #46 (December)
- Artemiz in Suicide Squad #35 (November)
- Azazel in The Sandman #4 (April)
- Blasters in Invasion! #1 (January)
- Garryn Bek in Invasion! #1 (January)
- Blockbuster (Roland Desmond) in Starman #9 (April)
- Brotherhood of Dada in Doom Patrol #26 (September)
- Corinthian in The Sandman #10 (October)
- Crazy Jane in Doom Patrol #19 (February)
- Crimson Fox in Justice League Europe #6 (September)
- Deadline in Starman #15 (October)
- El Diablo (Rafael Sandoval) in El Diablo vol. 2 #1 (August)
- Draaga in Superman #454 (May)
- Tim Drake in Batman #436 (August)
- Henri Ducard in Detective Comics #599 (April)
- The Endless in The Sandman #1 (January)
  - Death in The Sandman #8 (August)
  - Desire in The Sandman #10 (November)
  - Despair in The Sandman #10 (November)
  - Dream in The Sandman vol. 2 #1 (January)
- Eradicator in Action Comics Annual #2
- Forager in New Gods (vol. 3) #2 (March)
- Flamebird (Bette Kane) in Secret Origins Annual #3
- Freedom Beast in Animal Man #13 (July)
- Hawkwoman (Shayera Thal) in Hawkworld vol. 1, #1 (August)
- Huntress (Helena Bertinelli) in Huntress #1 (April)
- Kirigi in Batman #431 (March)
- Kono in Legion of Super-Heroes (vol. 4) #2 (December)
- Matthew the Raven in The Sandman vol. 2, #11 (December)
- Maxima in Action Comics #645 (September)
- Mirror Master (Evan McCulloch) in Animal Man #8 (February)
- Mr. Nobody in Doom Patrol vol. 2 #26 (September)
- Naiad in Firestorm, the Nuclear Man vol. 2 #90 (October)
- Linda Park in Flash vol. 2 #28 (July)
- Merv Pumpkinhead in The Sandman #5 (May)

=== Marvel Comics ===
- Agent in Marvel Graphic Novel: Rick Mason, The Agent
- Alley Viper in G.I. Joe: A Real American Hero #92 (November)
- Angler in Quasar #3 (mid-November)
- Prince Baran in Wolverine vol. 2 #6 (April)
- Blackheart in Daredevil #270 (September)
- Bloodscream in Wolverine vol. 2 #4 (February)
- Carrion (Malcolm McBride) in The Spectacular Spider-Man #149 (April)
- Andrew Chord in Thor #411 (December)
- Crossbones in Captain America #359 (early October)
- Crystal Ball in G.I. Joe Special Missions #24 (August)
- Darklon in G.I. Joe: A Real American Hero #88 (July)
- Dogfight in G.I. Joe Special Missions #28 (December)
- Jubilee in Uncanny X-Men #244 (May)
- Llan the Sorcerer in Alpha Flight #71 (June)
- Madman in The Incredible Hulk #363 (December)
- Matsu'o Tsurayaba in Uncanny X-Men #255 (mid-December)
- Midnight in Marc Spector: Moon Knight #4 (September)
- Misfit in West Coast Avengers #40 (January)
- Numinus in Power Pack #51 (December)
- Alfie O'Meagan in Marvel Comics Presents #25 (August)
- Perun in Captain America #352 (April)
- Portal in Avengers #304 (June)
- Powderkeg in Giant-Size Special: Captain Marvel #1
- Red Guardian (Josef Petkus) in Captain America #352 (April)
- Roughouse in Wolverine vol. 2, #4 (February)
- Shadowmasters in Punisher War Journal #8 (September)
- Shockwave in G.I. Joe Special Missions #17 (January)
- Shotgun in Daredevil #272 (November)
- Silver Fox in Wolverine vol. 2, #10 (August)
- Alysande Stuart in Excalibur #6 (March)
- Voltar in G.I.Joe: A Real American Hero #87 (June)
- Whiteout in Uncanny X-Men #250 (late-October)
- Worm in Uncanny X-Men #249 (early-October)

=== Independent and small press titles ===
- The Crow in Caliber Presents #1 (Caliber Comics, January)
- Krang in Teenage Mutant Ninja Turtles Adventures vol. 2, #1 (Archie Comics, March)
- Friday in 2000 AD #650 (Fleetway, 28 October)
- Freeza in Dragon Ball chapter 247
- Judge Giant, Jr. in 2000 AD #651 (Fleetway, 4 November)
