= Eisner Award for Best Single Issue/One-Shot =

American comic book award

Eisner Award for Best Single Issue/One-Shot (must be able to stand alone)
- Awarded for: Best Single Issue/One-Shot
- Country: United States
- First award: 1988
- Most recent winner: Absolute Batman 2025 Annual #1, by Daniel Warren Johnson, James Harren, and Meredith McClaren
- Website: www.comic-con.org/awards/eisner-awards/

The Eisner Award for Best Single Issue/One-Shot is an award for "creative achievement" in American comic books.

== Name changes ==
The award was launched as "Best Single Issue" in 1988. In 1991 it was changed to "Best Story or Single Issue." In 1992 it was changed to "Best Single Issue or Story" and multi-issue stories were eligible. In 1993 it was changed to "Best Single Issue (Self-Contained Story)." In 2002 it was changed to "Best Single Issue." In 2003 it was changed to "Best Single Issue or One-Shot." In 2022 it was changed to "Best Single Issue/One-Shot (must be able to stand alone)."

== Winners and nominees ==
Year	Title	Authors	Ref.
1980s
1988	Gumby Summer Fun Special #1 (Comico: The Comic Company)	Bob Burden and Art Adams	
1988	Concrete #5 (Dark Horse Comics)	Paul Chadwick	
1988	Eddy Current #1 (Mad Dog Graphics)	Ted McKeever	
1988	Grendel #12 (Comico: The Comic Company)	Matt Wagner, Arnold Pander, Jacob Pander, and Jay Geldof	
1988	Justice League International #1 (DC Comics)	Keith Giffen, J. M. DeMatteis, Kevin Maguire, and Terry Austin	
1988	Zot! #14 (Eclipse Comics)	Scott McCloud	
1989	Kings in Disguise #1 (Kitchen Sink Press)	James Vance and Dan Burr	
1989	Animal Man #5 (DC Comics)	Grant Morrison, Chas Truog, and Doug Hazlewood	
1989	Batman: The Killing Joke (DC Comics)	Alan Moore and Brian Bolland	
1989	Swamp Thing #75 (DC Comics)	Rick Veitch	
1989	Twist #2 (Kitchen Sink Press)	Various creators	
1990s
1990	There was no Eisner Award ceremony, or awards distributed, in 1990, due to widespread balloting mix-ups.		
1991	Concrete Celebrates Earth Day (Dark Horse Comics)	Paul Chadwick, Charles Vess, and Jean "Moebius" Giraud	
1991	BLAB! #5 (Kitchen Sink Press)	edited by Monte Beauchamp	
1991	Marshall Law: Kingdom of the Blind (Apocalypse Ltd)	Pat Mills and Kevin O'Neill	
1991	Zot! #33 (Eclipse Comics)	Scott McCloud	
1992 (Note: In 1992 the award was renamed to "Best Single Issue or Story" and multi-issue stories were eligible to be nominated.)	Sandman #22-#28 (DC Comics)	Neil Gaiman and various artists	
1992	American Splendor #16 (Tundra Publishing)	Harvey Pekar and various artists	
1992	Dark Horse Presents "Sin City" (Dark Horse Comics)	Frank Miller	
1992	Groo the Wanderer #78 (Marvel Comics/Epic Comics)	Mark Evanier and Sergio Aragonés	
1992	Swamp Thing #113 (DC Comics)	Nancy A. Collins, Thomas Yeates, and Shepherd Hendrix	
1993	Nexus: The Origin (Dark Horse Comics)	Mike Baron and Steve Rude	
1993	Bloodlines: A Tale from the Heart of Africa (Epic Comics)	Cindy Goff, Rafael Nieves, and Seitu Hayden	
1993	Hellblazer #56: "Diary of Danny Drake" (DC Comics)	Garth Ennis and David Lloyd	
1993	Peepshow #1 (Drawn & Quarterly)	Joe Matt	
1993	Sandman #40: "The Parliament of Rooks" (DC Comics)	Neil Gaiman and Jill Thompson	
1993	Sandman #39: "Soft Places" (DC Comics)	Neil Gaiman and John Watkiss	
1994	The Batman Adventures: Mad Love (DC Comics)	Paul Dini and Bruce Timm	
1994	Spawn #10: "Crossing Over" (Image Comics)	Dave Sim and Todd McFarlane	
1994	Groo the Wanderer #100: "A Little Knowledge" (Marvel Comics)	Mark Evanier and Sergio Aragonés	
1994	Marvels #2: "Monsters" (Marvel Comics)	Kurt Busiek and Alex Ross	
1994	Sandman #50: "Ramadan" (DC Comics/Vertigo Comics)	Neil Gaiman and P. Craig Russell	
1995	The Batman Adventures Holiday Special (DC Comics)	Paul Dini, Bruce Timm, Ronnie del Carmen, and others	
1995	Acme Novelty Library #1 (Fantagraphics)	Chris Ware	
1995	Bone #16: "Eyes of the Storm" (Cartoon Books)	Jeff Smith	
1995	The Dance of Lifey Death (Dark Horse Comics)	Eddie Campbell	
1995	Sandman Mystery Theatre Annual #1 (DC Comics/Vertigo Comics)	Matt Wagner, Steven T. Seagle, and various artists	
1996	Kurt Busiek's Astro City" #4: "Safeguards (Jukebox Productions/Image Comics)	Kurt Busiek and Brent Anderson	
1996	Acme Novelty Library #4 (Fantagraphics)	Chris Ware	
1996	Bacchus Color Special (Dark Horse Comics)	Eddie Campbell and Teddy Kristiansen	
1996	Eightball #16 (Fantagraphics)	Daniel Clowes	
1996	Stray Bullets #3: "The Party" (El Capitan Books)	David Lapham	
1997	Kurt Busiek's Astro City vol. 2 #1: "Welcome to Astro City" (Jukebox Productions/Homage Comics)	Kurt Busiek, Brent Anderson, and Will Blyberg	
1997	Giant THB Parade (Horse Press)	Paul Pope	
1997	Kane #13: "Point of View" (Dancing Elephant Press)	Paul Grist	
1997	Elric #0: Neil Gaiman's "One Life Furnished in Early Moorcock" (Topps)	adapted by P. Craig Russell	
1997	Optic Nerve #3 (Drawn & Quarterly)	Adrian Tomine	
1997	Sandman #75: "The Tempest" (DC Comics/Vertigo Comics)	Neil Gaiman and Charles Vess	
1997	Stray Bullets #10: "Here Comes the Circus" (El Capitan Books)	David Lapham	
1998	Kurt Busiek's Astro City vol. 2 #10: "Show `Em All" (Jukebox Productions/Homage Comics)	Kurt Busiek, Brent Anderson, and Will Blyberg	
1998	Batgirl Adventures #1 (DC Comics)	Paul Dini and Rick Burchett	
1998	The Dreaming #15: "Day's Work, Night's Rest" (DC Comics/Vertigo Comics)	Jeff Nicholson	
1998	Sof' Boy and Friends #1 (Drawn & Quarterly)	Archer Prewitt	
1998	Superman Adventures #3: "Distant Thunder (DC Comics)	Scott McCloud, Rick Burchett, and Terry Austin	
1999	Hitman #34: "Of Thee I Sing" (DC Comics)	Garth Ennis, John McCrea, and Garry Leach	
1999	The Clowns (I Pagliacci) (Dark Horse Comics)	P. Craig Russell and Galen Showman	
1999	Empty Love Stories (Funny Valentine Press)	Steve Darnall and various artists	
1999	From Hell: Dance of the Gull Catchers (Kitchen Sink Press)	Alan Moore and Eddie Campbell	
1999	Kane #22: "Fwankie's Big Night Out" (Dancing Elephant Press)	Paul Grist	
2000s
2000	Tom Strong #1: "How Tom Strong Got Started" (America's Best Comics)	Alan Moore, Chris Sprouse, and Al Gordon	
2000	I Die at Midnight (DC Comics/Vertigo Comics)	Kyle Baker	
2000	Promethea #3: "Misty Magicland" (America's Best Comics)	Alan Moore, J. H. Williams III, and Mick Gray	
2000	Stray Bullets #19: "Live Nude Girls!" (El Capitan Books)	David Lapham	
2000	Transmetropolitan #27: "Monstering" (DC Comics/Vertigo Comics)	Warren Ellis, Darick Robertson, and Rodney Ramos	
2001	Promethea #10: "Sex, Stars and Serpents" (America's Best Comics)	Alan Moore, J. H. Williams III, and Mick Gray	
2001	Finder #19: "Talisman" (Lightspeed Press)	Carla Speed McNeil	
2001	Hey Mister: The Trouble with Jesus (Top Shelf Productions)	Pete Sickman-Garner	
2001	Lucifer #4: "Born with the Dead" (Vertigo Comics/DC Comics)	Mike Carey, Warren Pleece, and Dean Ormston	
2001	Paul in the Country (Drawn & Quarterly)	Michel Rabagliati	
2001	Sock Monkey, vol. 3 #2 (Dark Horse Comics/Maverick)	Tony Millionaire	
2002	Eightball #22 (Fantagraphics)	Daniel Clowes	
2002	The Fall (Drawn & Quarterly)	Ed Brubaker and Jason Lutes	
2002	Finder #22: "Fight Scene" (Lightspeed Press)	Carla Speed McNeil	
2002	100 Bullets #27: "Idol Chatter" (DC Comics/Vertigo Comics)	Brian Azzarello and Eduardo Risso	
2002	Optic Nerve #8: "Bomb Scare" (Drawn & Quarterly)	Adrian Tomine	
2003	The Stuff of Dreams (Fantagraphics)	Kim Deitch	
2003	The Castaways (Absence of Ink)	Rob Vollmar and Pablo Callejo	
2003	Fleep (Sparkplug Comics)	Jason Shiga	
2003	My Friend Dahmer (Derfcity Comics)	Derf Backderf	
2003	My Uncle Jeff (Origin)	Damon Hurd and Pedro Camello	
2004	Conan: The Legend #0 (Dark Horse Comics) (Note: There was a tie between Conan: The Legend #0 and The Goon #1 for Best Single Issue in 2004.)	Kurt Busiek and Cary Nord	
2004	The Goon #1 (Dark Horse Comics)	Eric Powell	
2004	Finder #30: "Beware of Dog" (Lightspeed Press)	Carla Speed McNeil	
2004	Giant THB v.2 #1 (Horse Press)	Paul Pope	
2004	Global Frequency #5: "Big Sky" (WildStorm/DC Comics)	Warren Ellis and Jon J Muth	
2004	Usagi Yojimbo #65: "Usagi and the Tengu" (Dark Horse Comics)	Stan Sakai	
2005	Eightball #23: "The Death Ray" (Fantagraphics)	Daniel Clowes	
2005	Demo #7: "One Shot, Don't Miss" (AiT/Planet Lar)	Brian Wood and Becky Cloonan	
2005	Ex Machina #1: "The Pilot" (WildStorm/DC Comics)	Brian K. Vaughan, Tony Harris, and Tom Feister	
2005	Global Frequency #12: "Harpoon" (WildStorm/DC Comics)	Warren Ellis and Gene Ha	
2005	The Goon #6: "Ilagarto Hombre!" (Dark Horse Comics)	Eric Powell	
2006	Solo #5 (DC Comics)	Darwyn Cooke	
2006	The Bakers (Kyle Baker Publishing)	Kyle Baker	
2006	Ex Machina #11: "Fortune Favors" (WildStorm/DC Comics)	Brian K. Vaughan, Tony Harris, and Tom Feister	
2006	The Innocents (Fantagraphics/Coconino Press)	Gipi	
2006	Promethea #32: "Wrap Party" (America's Best Comics)	Alan Moore and J. H. Williams III	
2007	Batman/The Spirit #1: "Crime Convention" (DC Comics)	Jeph Loeb and Darwyn Cooke	
2007	A Late Freeze	Danica Novgorodoff	
2007	The Preposterous Adventures of IronHide Tom (AdHouse Books)	Joel Priddy	
2007	Skyscrapers of the Midwest #3 (AdHouse Books)	Joshua Cotter	
2007	They Found the Car (Fantagraphics)	Gipi	
2008	Justice League of America #11: "Walls" (DC Comics)	Brad Meltzer and Gene Ha	
2008	Amelia Rules! #18: "Things I Cannot Change" (Renaissance Press)	Jimmy Gownley	
2008	Delilah Dirk and the Treasure of Constantinople	Tony Cliff	
2008	Johnny Hiro #1 (AdHouse Books)	Fred Chao	
2008	The Sensational Spider-Man Annual #1: "To Have or to Hold" (Marvel Comics)	Matt Fraction and Salvador Larroca	
2009	No award given out in 2009.		
2010s
2010	Captain America #601: “Red, White and Blue-Blood" (Marvel Comics)	Ed Brubaker and Gene Colan	
2010	The Brave and the Bold #28: “Blackhawk and the Flash: Firing Line" (DC Comics)	J. Michael Straczynski and Jesus Saiz	
2010	Ganges #3 (Fantagraphics)	Kevin Huizenga	
2010	The Unwritten #5: “How the Whale Became" (Vertigo Comics/DC Comics)	Mike Carey and Peter Gross	
2010	Usagi Yojimbo #123: “The Death of Lord Hikiji” (Dark Horse Comics)	Stan Sakai	
2011	Hellboy: Double Feature of Evil (Dark Horse Comics)	Mike Mignola and Richard Corben	
2011	The Cape (IDW Publishing)	Joe Hill, Jason Ciaramella, and Zack Howard	
2011	Fables #100 (Vertigo Comics/DC Comics)	Bill Willingham, Mark Buckingham, and others	
2011	Locke & Key: Keys to the Kingdom #1: “Sparrow" (IDW Publishing)	Joe Hill and Gabriel Rodriguez	
2011	Unknown Soldier #21: “A Gun in Africa" (Vertigo Comics/DC Comics)	Joshua Dysart and Rick Veitch	
2012	Daredevil #7 (Marvel Comics)	Mark Waid, Paolo Rivera, and Joe Rivera	
2012	Ganges #4 (Fantagraphics)	Kevin Huizenga	
2012	Locke & Key: Guide to the Known Keys (IDW Publishing)	Joe Hill and Gabriel Rodriguez	
2012	Princeless #3 (Action Lab Comics)	Jeremy Whitley and Mia Goodwin	
2012	The Unwritten #24: "Stairway to Heaven" (Vertigo Comics/DC Comics)	Mike Carey, Peter Gross, and Al Davison	
2013	The Mire	Becky Cloonan	
2013	Lose #4: "The Fashion Issue" (Koyama Press)	Michael DeForge	
2013	Pope Hats #3 (AdHouse Books)	Ethan Rilly	
2013	Post York #1 (Uncivilized Books)	James Romberger and Crosby	
2013	Tales Designed to Thrizzle #8 (Fantagraphics)	Michael Kupperman	
2014	Hawkeye #11: “Pizza Is My Business" (Marvel Comics)	Matt Fraction and David Aja	
2014	Demeter	Becky Cloonan	
2014	Love and Rockets: New Stories #6 (Fantagraphics)	Gilbert Hernandez and Jaime Hernandez	
2014	Viewotron #2	Sam Sharpe	
2014	Watson and Holmes #6 (New Paradigm Studios)	Brandon M. Easton and N. Steven Harris	
2015	Beasts of Burden: Hunters and Gatherers (Dark Horse Comics)	Evan Dorkin and Jill Thompson	
2015	Astro City #16: “Wish I May” (Vertigo Comics/DC Comics)	Kurt Busiek and Brent Anderson	
2015	Madman in Your Face 3D Special (Image Comics)	Mike Allred	
2015	Marvel 75th Anniversary Celebration #1 (Marvel Comics)	Various creators	
2015	The Multiversity: Pax Americana #1 (DC Comics)	Grant Morrison and Frank Quitely	
2016	Silver Surfer #11: “Never After" (Marvel Comics)	Dan Slott and Mike Allred	
2016	A Blanket of Butterflies (HighWater Press)	Richard Van Camp and Scott B. Henderson	
2016	I Love This Part (Avery Hill Publishing)	Tillie Walden	
2016	Mowgli’s Mirror (Retrofit Comics/Big Planet Comics)	Olivier Schrauwen	
2016	Pope Hats #4 (AdHouse Books)	Ethan Rilly	
2017	Beasts of Burden: What the Cat Dragged In (Dark Horse Comics)	Evan Dorkin, Sarah Dyer, and Jill Thompson	
2017	Babybel Wax Bodysuit (Retrofit Comics/Big Planet Comics)	Eric Kostiuk Williams	
2017	Blammo #9 (Kilgore Books)	Noah Van Sciver	
2017	Criminal 10th Anniversary Special (Image Comics)	Ed Brubaker and Sean Phillips	
2017	Sir Alfred #3 (Pigeon Press)	Tim Hensley	
2017	Your Black Friend (Silver Sprocket)	Ben Passmore	
2018	Hellboy: Krampusnacht (Dark Horse Comics)	Mike Mignola and Adam Hughes	
2018	Barbara (ShortBox)	Nicole Miles	
2018	Pope Hats #5 (AdHouse Books)	Ethan Rilly	
2018	The Spotted Stone (Sun Comics)	Rick Veitch	
2018	What Is Left (ShortBox)	Rosemary Valero-O'Connell	
2019	Peter Parker: The Spectacular Spider-Man #310 (Marvel Comics)	Chip Zdarsky	
2019	Beneath the Dead Oak Tree (ShortBox)	Emily Carroll	
2019	Black Hammer: Cthu-Louise (Dark Horse Comics)	Jeff Lemire and Emi Lenox	
2019	No Better Words (Silver Sprocket)	Carolyn Nowak	
2019	The Terrible Elisabeth Dumn Against the Devils In Suits (IHQ Studio/Image Comics)	Arabson Assis, translated by James Robinson	
2020s
2020	My Favorite Thing Is Monsters (Fantagraphics)	Emil Ferris	
2020	Coin-Op #8: Infatuation (Coin-Op Books)	Peter Hoey and Maria Hoey	
2020	The Freak (AdHouse Books)	Matt Lesniewski	
2020	Minotäar (ShortBox)	Lissa Treiman	
2020	Sobek (ShortBox)	James Stokoe	
2021	Sports is Hell (Koyama Press)	Ben Passmore	
2021	The Burning Hotels (Birdcage Bottom Books)	Thomas Lampion	
2021	Hedra (Image Comics)	Jesse Lonergan	
2021	The Other History of the DC Universe #1 (DC Comics)	John Ridley and Giuseppe Camuncoli	
2021	Stanley's Ghost: A Halloween Adventure (Storm Kids)	Jeff Balke, Paul Storrie, and Dave Alvarez	
2022	Wonder Woman Historia: The Amazons (DC Comics)	Kelly Sue DeConnick and Phil Jimenez	
2022	Marvel’s Voices: Identity #1 (Marvel Comics)	edited by Darren Shan	
2022	Mouse Guard: The Owlhen Caregiver and Other Tales (Boom! Comics/Archaia)	David Petersen	
2022	Nightwing #87: "Get Grayson" (DC Comics)	Tom Taylor and Bruno Redondo	
2022	Wolvendaughter (Quindrie Press)	Ver	
2023	Batman: One Bad Day: The Riddler (DC Comics)	by Tom King and Mitch Gerads	
2023	Mary Jane & Black Cat Beyond	Jed Mackay and C. F. Villa	
2023	Moon Knight: Black, White, and Blood #3 (Marvel Comics)	edited by Tom Brevoort	
2023	Star Trek #400 (IDW)	edited by Heather Antos	
2023	A Vicious Circle Book 1 (BOOM! Studios)	by Mattson Tomlin and Lee Bermejo	
2024	Nightwing #105 (DC Comics)	Tom Taylor and Bruno Redondo	
2024	Sweet Paprika: Black, White, & Pink (Image Comics)	Mirka Andolfo	
2024	Horologist (Grim Film)	Jared Lee and Cross	
2024	Star Trek: Day of Blood (IDW)	Ryan North and Derek Charm	
2024	Superman 2023 Annual (DC Comics)	Joshua Williamson	
2025	The War on Gaza (Fantagraphics)	Joe Sacco	
2025	Abortion Pill Zine: A Community Guide to Misoprostol and Mifepristone (Silver Sprocket)	Isabella Rotman, Marnie Galloway, and Sage Coffey	
2025	Decompression in a Wreck, Part One in Ice Cream #39 (Image Comics)	W. Maxwell Prince and Martin Morazzo	
2025	PeePee PooPoo #1 (Silver Sprocket)	Caroline Cash	
2025	Unwholesome Love (Partners and Son)	Charles Burns	
2025	Sunflowers (Silver Sprocket)	Keezy Young	
2026	Absolute Batman 2025 Annual #1 (DC)	Daniel Warren Johnson, James Harren, Meredith McClaren	
2026	Absolute Martian Manhunter #1 (DC)	Deniz Camp, Javier Rodriguez	
2026	Assorted Crisis Events #4 (Image)	Deniz Camp, Eric Zawadzki	
2026	Coin-Op no. 10: Wet Cement (Coin-Op Books)	Peter Hoey, Maria Hoey	
2026	Ice Cream Man #43: One Page Horror Stories (Image)	W. Maxwell Prince	
2026	Something is Killing the Children: A Monster Hunter Walks into a Bar #1 (BOOM!)	James Tynion IV, Werther Dell'Edera	
