= Trident (disambiguation) =

A trident is a three-pronged staff.

Trident may also refer to:

== Places ==
=== South Georgia ===
- The Trident, a mountain in South Georgia

=== United Kingdom ===
- Trident, West Yorkshire, a civil parish and community in the City of Bradford

=== United States ===
- Trident Technical College, a college in Charleston, South Carolina
- Trident, Montana, a ghost town

=== Other ===
- Trident (crater), a crater in Taurus-Littrow valley on the Moon

== Military ==
- Trident (missile), a submarine-launched ballistic missile used by the United States and the United Kingdom
  - Trident (UK nuclear programme), based on the Trident missile
- French ship Trident (1811), a Téméraire-class ship of the French Navy
- HMS Trident (1768), a 64-gun third-rate ship of the line
- HMS Trident (1845), a sloop built by Ditchburn & Mare
- HMS Trident (N52), a T-class submarine built in 1937
- USS Trident (AMc-107), a World War II US Navy minesweeper
- SNCASO Trident, a French prototype interceptor aircraft
- Operation Trident (1971), the codename for an Indian Navy action during the Indo-Pakistani War
- Washington Conference (1943) or Trident, a strategic meeting between the United States and the United Kingdom during World War II

== Computers ==
- MSHTML (Trident), a browser engine in Internet Explorer
- Trident Microsystems, a former graphics chip manufacturer
- Trident, the name of the Triglav computer outside Slovenia
- Project Trident, a desktop edition spin off of a TrueOS operating system

== Comics ==
- Trident Comics, a former publisher of British comic books
- Trident (UK comics), an anthology comic book
- Trident (DC Comics), a DC Comics character
- Trident Corporation, a fictional corporation in Spriggan

== Vehicles ==
- Peel Trident, a British microcar made by the Peel Engineering Company
- Trident Cars, a British sports car manufacturer
- BSA Rocket 3/Triumph Trident, a 1960s/1970s British motorcycle made by Triumph Engineering, Meriden
- Triumph Trident, a 1990s British motorcycle made by Triumph
- Dennis Trident 2, a 2-axle bus model manufactured by Dennis Specialist Vehicles
- Dennis Trident 3, a 3-axle bus model manufactured by Dennis Specialist Vehicles
- Hawker Siddeley Trident, an aircraft designed by de Havilland
- Trident (spacecraft), a space mission concept to the outer planets proposed as a part of NASA's Discovery program

== Music ==
- Trident (McCoy Tyner album) (1975)
- Trident (Kingfish album) (1978)
- Trident Studios, a recording studio in Soho
- Trident, a record label of The Trip
- Trident, a Japanese band composed of Mai Fuchigami, Manami Numakura, and Hibiku Yamamura, based on TV anime series Arpeggio of Blue Steel

== Science and research ==
- Trident (spacecraft), proposed space mission to the outer planets as part of NASA's Discovery Program for launch in 2025/2026
- Trident curve, an algebraic curve
- Trident laser, a high-power short pulse laser facility at Los Alamos National Laboratory
- TRopIcal DEep-sea Neutrino Telescope, a proposed neutrino detector in the South China Sea

== Other uses ==
- The Trident (restaurant), in Sausalito, California, United States
- Le Trident (theatre), Cherbourg, France
- Trident (gum), a sugarless chewing gum manufactured by Perfetti Van Melle BV and formerly by Mondelēz International Group
- Operation Trident (1971), an offensive operation by the Indian Navy against the city of Karachi during the Indo-Pakistani War of 1971
- Operation Trident (Metropolitan Police), a Metropolitan Police Service unit dealing with gun crime in London
- Trident Racing, a motor racing team
- Trident University International, an online school for higher education
- Trishul (film), or Trident, a 1978 Indian film directed by Yash Chopra

== See also ==
- HMS Trident, a list of ships of the Royal Navy
- Trident submarine (disambiguation), a common name for the British Vanguard-class and American Ohio-class Trident missile-armed submarines
- Trishul (disambiguation), a symbol in Indian religions
- Tryzub, the coat of arms of Ukraine
