= Trident (comics) =

Trident name in comics

Trident, in comics, may refer to:

- Trident Comics, a former publisher of British comic books
- Trident (UK comics), an anthology comic book title
- Trident (DC Comics), a DC Comics character
- Trident Corporation, a fictional corporation in the manga Spriggan

== See also ==
- Trident (disambiguation)
