= Steve Whitaker =

British Artist (1955-2008)

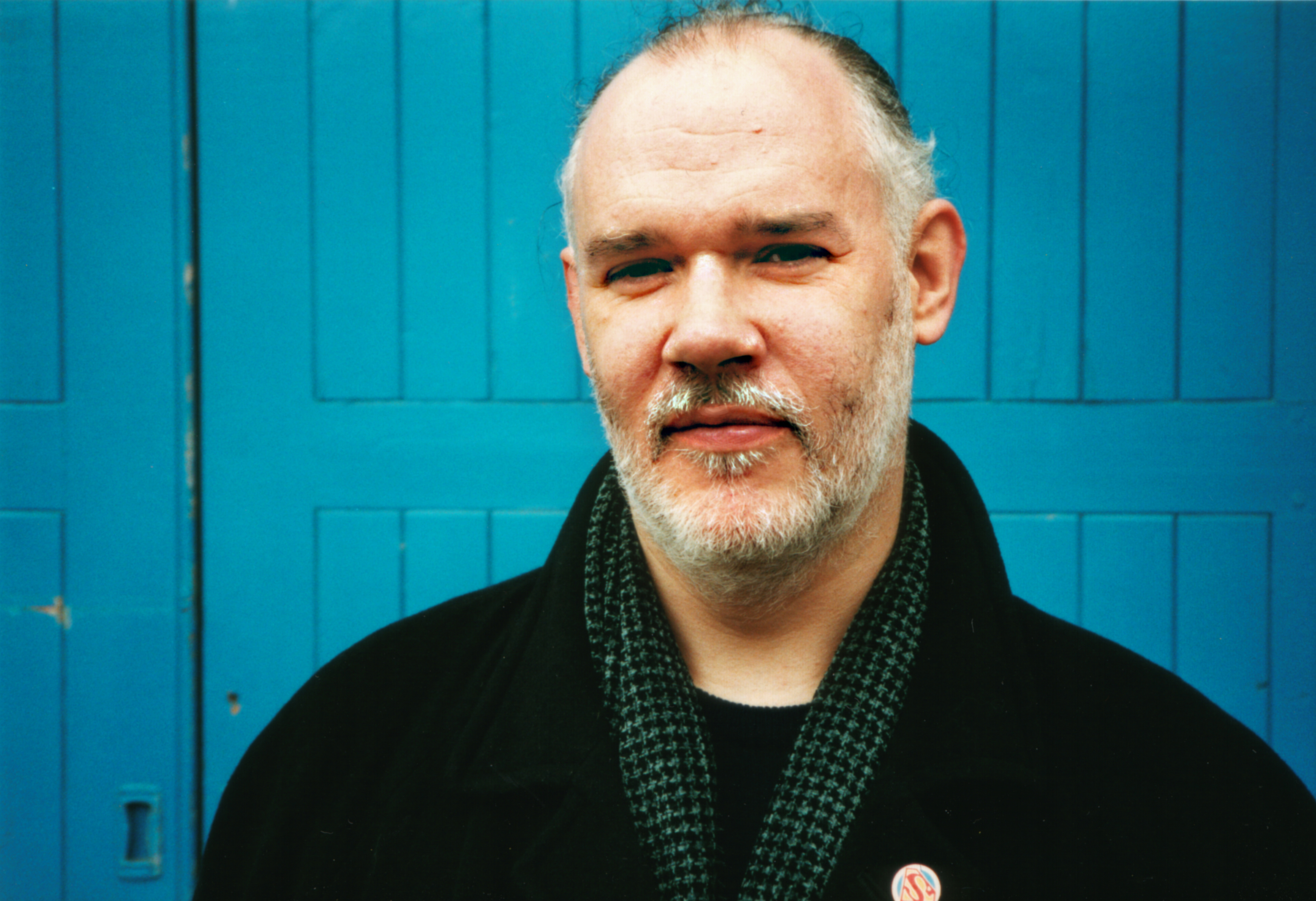
- Steve Whitaker
- Born: 26 June 1955
- Died: 22 February 2008 (aged 52)
- Area: Colourist
- Notable works: V for Vendetta

Steve Whitaker (26 June 1955 – 22 February 2008) was a British artist best known as the colourist on the reprint of V for Vendetta.

David Lloyd, the artist on V for Vendetta, said Whitaker "was not only one of the finest colourists Britain has ever produced, but a great artist, a scholar of the comics medium, and a great teacher, too, who I worked with at The London Cartoon Centre in its various incarnations."

== Biography ==
V for Vendetta was originally published in black and white in Warrior, with colour added for the American reprint and continuation. He was also the author of The Encyclopedia of Cartooning Techniques.

Whitaker had been an active member of the British Amateur Press Association until it was disbanded in 2004. Following his death, ex-member Tony Keen announced he would organise a one-off memorial mailing, as he had for fellow BAPAn Andy Roberts.

== Bibliography ==
- V for Vendetta (colourist, with writer Alan Moore and artist David Lloyd, DC Comics, 1988)
- Saga of the Man-Elf #1-2 (with Michael Moorcock, Trident Comics, 1989)
- St. Swithin's Day (colourist, with writer Grant Morrison and artist Paul Grist, one-shot reprint, Trident Comics, 1990)
- "The Last Party On Earth" (art, with writers Jean-Marc Lofficier/Randy Lofficier, A1 #4, June 1990, ISBN 1-871878-56-X)
- The Encyclopedia of Cartooning Techniques: A Unique A-Z Directory of Cartoon Techniques (Running, 1994, ISBN 978-1-56138-354-2)
- Street Fighter II: The Manga (colourist, Manga Publishing, 1995)
