= Trishula (disambiguation) =

The trishula is a trident, a divine symbol in Hinduism

Trishula, or variants, may refer to:

== Film ==
- Trishul (film), a 1978 Indian action drama film
- Trisulam (film), a 1982 Indian drama film

== Military ==
- Trishul (missile), an Indian surface-to-air missile
- INS Trishul, the name of two Indian Navy frigates
- Indian Air Force Trishul Air Base, at Bareilly Airport, Uttar Pradesh, India

== Places ==
=== India ===
- Tirsuli, a mountain peak in the Himalayas
  - Tirsuli West
- Trisul, mountain peaks in the Himalayas
- Tirusulam, a suburb of Chennai, India
  - Tirusulam railway station

=== Nepal ===
- Trishuli Hydropower Station, in Trishuli bazaar, Nuwakot district
- Trishuli River

== Other uses ==
- Trisula (moth)

== See also ==
- Trident (disambiguation)
- Trishul (disambiguation)
