= Sonic the Comic =

British comic

- Cover of issue #125, art by Richard Elson

Publication information
- Publisher: Egmont (originally Fleetway); Sega Europe
- Schedule: Biweekly
- Format: Finished
- Publication date: May 1993–January 2002
- No. of issues: 223 (Note: Issues 1 through 184 included original stories; issues 185 through 223 were exclusively reprints.)
- Main character: Sonic the Hedgehog

Creative team
- Written by: Nigel Kitching, Lew Stringer et al.
- Artist(s): Richard Elson, Mick McMahon et al.

Sonic the Comic is a British comic published by Fleetway Publications, based on Sega's Sonic the Hedgehog video game franchise. It ran biweekly for 223 issues from 1993 to 2002. The first editor was Richard Burton, and contributors included Richard Elson, Nigel Kitching, Lew Stringer, Andy Diggle and Nigel Dobbyn.

Sonic the Comic featured stories, news and reviews aimed at children. It included adaptations of Sonic games alongside original stories, as well as "Sega Superstars" stories based on other Sega Mega Drive games, such as Streets of Rage, Shinobi, Golden Axe and Decap Attack. The final story arc was an adaptation of Sonic Adventure (1998), followed by 39 issues reprinting old stories. Following the comic's cancellation, fans started Sonic the Comic Online, an unofficial webcomic continuation.

== Content ==
Sonic the Comic featured comic strips, Sega news, game reviews, tips, fan art and letters. It adapted Sonic the Hedgehog games such as Sonic CD (1993), Sonic the Hedgehog 3 (1994) and Sonic Adventure (1998), alongside original stories starring Sonic and other characters from the series. Many issues featured "Sega Superstars" stories based on other Sega franchises. These included Shinobi, Golden Axe, Wonder Boy, Kid Chameleon, Streets of Rage, Decap Attack, Ecco the Dolphin, Eternal Champions, and Shining Force, as well as Sega Europe's "pirate television" advertising campaign. Three non-Sega games were also adapted: Electronic Arts' Mutant League Football, Domark's Marko's Magic Football and Konami's Rocket Knight Adventures. Each issue was presented by the comic's mascot, Megadroid, a robot built from pieces of a Sega Mega Drive.

Issue 8 features an origin story for Sonic and Dr Robotnik, who was once a kind scientist named Dr Kintobor before being turned evil in a lab accident. Compared to other versions of the character, Sonic is cocky, sarcastic and rude, but cares about his friends. Robotnik initially resembled his appearance from the games, but was altered in later issues to match his appearance in the animated series Adventures of Sonic the Hedgehog (1993) at Sega's request. Robotnik's assistant was planned as Snively, a character created for the Sonic the Hedgehog (1993–1994) animated series. As rights problems prevented his use, Kitching created a replacement character, Grimer.

Characters from the video games such as Tails, Knuckles and Amy Rose appear as Sonic's allies and were given solo storylines. They are joined by Johnny Lightfoot and Porker Lewis, characters based on the small animals that Sonic rescues in the games. The villain Metal Sonic was adapted as the Brotherhood of Metallix, a legion of robotic Sonic doppelgängers inspired by the Daleks from Doctor Who. Whereas Super Sonic is portrayed in the games as a more powerful version of Sonic, in Sonic the Comic he is an evil alter ego who emerges under stress, similar to the Marvel character Hulk. Richard Elson gave Super Sonic "unhinged" swirling eyes inspired by the cartoons of Ralph Steadman. Original characters include the robotic antihero Shortfuse the Cybernik; Amy's best friend and scientist Tekno the Canary; the evil shapeshifter Metamorphia; the sky pirate Captain Plunder; the liquid mutant Megatox; the crime boss Lord Sidewinder; Robotnik's treacherous second-in-command Commander Brutus; and the duplicitous echidna Doctor Zachary.

== History ==
The first issue was published on 29 May 1993, with subsequent issues released biweekly. The first editor was Richard Burton, who had previously worked for Marvel UK and 2000 AD. It was later edited by Deborah Tate and Andy Diggle. Freelance contributors included Nigel Kitching, Lew Stringer, Mark Millar, Richard Elson, Mick McMahon, Nigel Dobbyn, Carl Flint and Roberto Corona. Kitching and Elson were not Sonic fans, and Elson said he preferred Nintendo games. Stringer began submitting more comedic stories at Burton's suggestion to balance out the more serious tone of Kitching's stories. Contributors were sent a style guide as well as a Sega Mega Drive and a copy of Sonic the Hedgehog 2 (1992) for reference. Unlike many comics, such as Marvel comics, the artwork for each story was created only after the script was completed.

Whereas the American animated series and Sonic Archie comic ignored the continuity of the games, Sonic the Comic built on it, starting from the events of Sonic the Hedgehog 2. As there was no Sonic bible, Kitching developed the backstory based on the guide book Stay Sonic, published by Penguin Books in 1993, which was based on early Sega of America production material. The comic initially featured "Sega Superstars" stories based on other games, but these were gradually phased out in favor of stories following other characters from the Sonic series. Four paperback compilations were released by Ravette Publishing in 1994. Stringer enjoyed writing for original characters like Brutus, as they could have complete storylines with defined endings, unlike characters from the games who had to remain in the comic. For the 100th issue, Kitching had Robotnik overthrown as the dictator of Mobius, as he did not want to send the message that evil cannot be defeated.

Sega hired Copyright Promotions to handle Sonic licensing in the UK. Initially, Copyright Promotions placed strict limits on the comic, causing conflict, but Sega sided with the authors and allowed them to create characters and write multi-part stories. However, the amount of violence was limited. For example, a scene in which Knuckles is about to be lynched was redrawn to place the noose around his body rather than his neck, while a gun was redrawn to have it fire a sucker dart. The comic was allowed greater freedom with stories that did not feature the Sonic characters. Later, a different licensing company applied new rules, with guidelines for the number, position and orientation of Sonic's spines, the position of his pupils, and a rule against showing Sonic's teeth.

Following budget cuts in 1997, multiple changes were gradually made to the comic's format. The news, reviews, tips and letters sections were removed, pages were cut, Megadroid was omitted, and reprints of older stories were introduced. By issue 157, the comic featured only one original story per issue. Kitching was fired during this period, with Stringer taking over as lead writer. Kitching returned in 2000 to write the final story arc, an adaptation of Sonic Adventure. From issue 185, Sonic the Comic comprised only reprints. The last issue, number 223, was published in January 2002. Elson said the editors had wrongly assumed that readers had outgrown the comic and that reprints would find new readers. Instead, he believed readers abandoned it when it began reprinting old stories. He and Kitching believed the comic could have continued. Stringer agreed, noting the reprints were a short-term cost saving measure at the expense of readership.

== Legacy ==
While Sonic the Comic developed an avid fanbase, the Egmont Group, which holds the publishing rights as of 2026, has never reprinted it. In 2024, John Freeman reported that Sega no longer sees Sonic the Comic as "on brand" and has restricted Egmont from reprinting it. Limited Run Games included a reprint of the Rocket Knight Adventures adaptation with the physical release of the Rocket Knight Adventures: Re-Sparked (2024) compilation. The post-credits scene of the film Sonic the Hedgehog 3 (2024), which features multiple Metal Sonics, drew comparisons to the Brotherhood of Metallix. Kitching and Elson contributed to the Sonic the Hedgehog's 900th Adventure (2023) one-shot comic by IDW Publishing.

In response to the cancellation, fans created Sonic the Comic Online, an unofficial webcomic continuation, in 2003. Kitching said it was a "rather good continuation" and Corona said he was impressed by the "dedication and talent ... Those guys refused to accept the end just because the publisher decided to pull the plug." In 2018, Sonic the Comic Online published a story written by Kitching and illustrated by Dobbyn and Michael Corker that acted as an epilogue to the Sonic the Comic continuity. Multiple fan artists collaborated on Sonic the Comic Reillustrated, a compilation of stories from the comic with each panel redrawn by a different illustrator.

In June 2026, a group of fans launched Sonic the Comic Remastered, a project to reconstruct scanned issues for a better reading experience on modern output devices. The project was cancelled days later due to backlash over its alteration of the original art using generative AI. That month, a separate group of fans began work on the Sonic the Comic Rescan Project, a more faithful restoration effort that aimed to re-scan every issue and its spinoffs at 600dpi resolution.
