= Piranha Press =

Imprint of DC Comics from 1989 to 1994

- Parent company: DC Comics (Warner Bros.)
- Status: Defunct
- Founded: 1989; 37 years ago
- Founder: Mark Nevelow
- Defunct: 1994; 32 years ago
- Country of origin: United States
- Headquarters location: New York City
- Key people: Mark Nevelow; Karen McBurnie; Dean Motter; Bhob Stewart; Dale Crain
- Publication types: Comic books
- Fiction genres: Alternative
- Imprints: Piranha Music

Piranha Press, an imprint of DC Comics from 1989 to 1994, was a response by DC to the growing interest in alternative comics. The imprint was edited by Mark Nevelow, who instead of developing comics with the established names in the alternative comics field, chose to introduce several unknown illustrators with an eclectic and diverse line of experimental graphic novels and stories. Unusual for the time, Nevelow succeeded in getting DC to agree to contracts giving creator ownership to writers and artists.

== History ==
DC announced its plan to form the Piranha imprint in 1987. Nevelow's associate editor on the imprint was Karen McBurnie. Designer Dean Motter created the signature Piranha cover format and logo. After the initial 1989 titles were art directed by John Workman, the in-house Piranha production design was by Bhob Stewart from 1989 to 1992, with other design contributions by Dale Crain, Rick Spanier, Richard Bruning, Veronica Carlin, Margaret Clark and Rick Keene.

Artist-writer Alec Stevens was the first creator to sign a contract with Piranha Press in September 1988, and his graphic novels The Sinners and Hardcore followed in June 1989 and January 1990, respectively. A third book, A Winter Within, was verbally agreed upon, but a contract never materialized.

Piranha's most successful title was Kyle Baker's Why I Hate Saturn which had multiple printings. Beautiful Stories for Ugly Children, a 32-page monthly anthology of Dave Louapre's stories, illustrated by Dan Sweetman, had a 30-issue run from June 1989 to September 1992. Humor series of note were John Blair Moore's Invaders from Home!!!, Marc Hempel's 120-page Gregory, and Epicurus the Sage by William Messner-Loebs and Sam Kieth.

Other Piranha writers and artists included Gil Ashby, Mark Badger, Glenn Barr, Charlie Boatner, Damon Cardwell, Tim Conrad, Michael Davis, Gerard Jones, Jon Hammer, Alison Marek, Douglas Michael, Steve Parkhouse, and Jennifer Waters.

In early 1991, Nevelow left the company. With his departure, the imprint began to drastically change its editorial direction in an effort to attain the commercial success that largely eluded them.

Piranha's last published comic was the one-shot Prince and the New Power Generation: Three Chains of Gold, which came out in 1994. The imprint was shut down shortly thereafter, replaced by the new imprint Paradox Press. Howard Cruse's Stuck Rubber Baby (1995) was a project that began with Piranha Press. The book took so long for Cruse to draw, however, that it was later published under the Paradox Press imprint by editors Andy Helfer and Bronwyn Taggart, with design by Robbin Brosterman.

== Piranha Music ==
Piranha Press briefly published music-related comics under the imprint Piranha Music; the imprint is primarily associated with two officially licensed comics based on the musician Prince. The first, Prince: Alter Ego (1991), was written by Dwayne McDuffie with art by Denys Cowan. A story that blends romance, action, and fantasy elements portrays a fictionalized version of Prince as a philosophical and enigmatic figure. A second title, Prince and the New Power Generation: Three Chains of Gold (1994), was also written by McDuffie and features art by David Williams and Deryl Skelton, with inks by Josef Rubinstein. The fictionalized Prince — and his band, the New Power Generation — are caught up in a story involving political intrigue and the search for mystical artifacts.

== Titles published ==
=== Ongoing series ===
- Beautiful Stories for Ugly Children, by Dave Louapre and Dan Sweetman (32 issues, June 1989–Sept. 1992)
- Epicurus the Sage, by William Messner-Loebs and Sam Kieth (2 issues, 1989–91)
- Etc., by Tim Conrad and Michael Davis (5 issues, June 1989–Nov. 1990)
- Fast Forward, edited by Andrew Helfer, written by Grant Morrison, Kyle Baker & William Messner-Loebs, with various artists (3 issues, Oct. 1992–Jan. 1993)
- Gregory, by Marc Hempel (4 issues, 1989–93)
- Invaders from Home!!!, by John Blair Moore (6 issues, 1990)
- The Score, by Gerard Jones and Mark Badger (4 issues, July 1989–Nov.1989)

=== Original graphic novels ===
- Desert Streams, by Alison Marek (1989)
- The Drowned Girl, by Jon Hammer (1991)
- The Elvis Mandible, by Douglas Michael (1990)
- Hardcore, by Alec Stevens (Jan. 1990)
- The Hiding Place, by Charlie Boatner and Steve Parkhouse (1990)
- The Laziest Secretary in the World, by Jennifer Waters and Gil Ashby (1990)
- Mars on Earth, by Damon Cardwell and Glenn L. Barr (Jan. 1992)
- Nation of Snitches, by Jon Hammer (Sept. 1990)
- Prince: Alter Ego, by Dwayne McDuffie, Denys Cowan and Kent Williams (Jan. 1991)
- Prince and the New Power Generation: Three Chains of Gold, by Dwayne McDuffie, Steve Carr, Deryl Skelton, David A. Williams and Josef Rubinstein (1994)
- The Sinners, by Alec Stevens (June 1989)
- Sparrow, by Alison Marek (1990)
- The Wasteland, by Dave Louapre and Dan Sweetman (1989)
- Why I Hate Saturn, by Kyle Baker (1990)

=== One-shots ===
- A Cotton Candy Autopsy, by Dave Louapre and Dan Sweetman (Jan. 1990)
