= St. Swithin's Day (comics) =

Comic by Grant Morrison and Paul Grist

- Cover of St. Swithin's Day collected edition from Trident Comics
- Created by: Grant Morrison; Paul Grist

Publication information
- Publisher: Trident Comics
- Schedule: Bi-monthly
- Title(s): Trident #1-4
- Formats: Original material for the series has been published as a strip in the comics anthology(s) Trident.
- Publication date: August 1989 – February 1990

Creative team
- Writer(s): Grant Morrison
- Artist(s): Paul Grist
- Letterer(s): Paul Grist
- Colorist(s): Steve Whitaker (reprint)
- Editor(s): Martin Skidmore

St. Swithin's Day is a story written by Grant Morrison and drawn by Paul Grist in 1989 for Trident Comics.

The story is said by Morrison to be based on their diaries and is also said to be partly autobiographical. This story, is told from the point of view of an unnamed teenager living in 1980s Britain who plans an encounter with then Prime Minister Margaret Thatcher, a politician that the teenager hates, on July 15 (which is Saint Swithin's Day, the origin of the book's title).

== Publication history ==
It originally appeared in Trident (which was Trident Comics' anthology title) issues 1-4 in black and white.

=== Collected editions ===
In 1990 it was compiled into a single edition and reprinted by Trident Comics in colour. This edition quickly went out of print and for many years it remained out of print as Trident Comics had gone out of business in 1991. It was later reprinted by Oni Press in 1998.

== Plot ==
St.Swithin's Day tells the story of an alienated British teenager in the 1980s and in particular, Margaret Thatcher's time as British Prime Minister (her time as prime minister lasted for 11 years, including the entire 1980s).

The lead character, a teenager (who is not given a name in the story) is first seen shoplifting a copy of The Catcher in the Rye from a London bookshop. He says, "I hate the rain. Everything bad happens in the rain." His reason for stealing the book is not clear beyond him saying they can find it in his pocket "when this is all over".

During the course of the story, it is revealed that the teenager is from an unnamed northern British town or city, stealing his housemates' unemployment benefits to come to London to assassinate Margaret Thatcher while she makes a public appearance at a technical college on July 15, Saint Swithin's Day.

Much of the strip is made up of the teenager preparing himself to assassinate Thatcher and exploring his own teenage angst. The final chapter starts with the teenager waiting for Thatcher after writing "neurotic boy outsider" on his forehead. He does not pull out a gun; nonetheless, him pretending to shoot Thatcher causes her bodyguards to attack him. While being beaten the teenager thinks, "it was worth it just to see her scared". The last scenes are of the teenager traveling on a train on a sunny day and his final lines are "I don't care if it rains. I really don't care at all."

== Reaction and controversy ==
Reaction to the story was hugely positive within the comics community. However, the story of its publication had been picked up by the British tabloid newspaper The Sun, a pro-Thatcher newspaper. They ran an item on the story under the headline "DEATH TO MAGGIE BOOK SPARKS TORY UPROAR," with quotes from MPs such as Teddy Taylor condemning the book. This even led to questions being asked in the House of Commons about the comic.

All this proved great publicity for Trident Comics and they took advantage of it, even going as far to reprint The Sun's article in advertising for the reprint edition.
