= Saviour (comics) =

1989–1991 comic book series by Mark Millar

Publication information
- Publisher: Trident Comics
- Schedule: Bi-monthly
- Format: Ongoing series
- Genre: Superhero
- Publication date: December 1989 – January 1991
- No. of issues: 6
- Main character: The Saviour

Creative team
- Written by: Mark Millar
- Artist(s): Daniel Vallely (#1); Nigel Kitching (#2-6)
- Editor: Martin Skidmore

Saviour is the title of a comic book series written by Mark Millar and drawn by Daniel Vallely and Nigel Kitching. It was Millar's first professionally published work.

== Publication history ==
Saviour was published by Trident Comics from 1989 to 1990 and ran for six issues until Trident went bankrupt.

== Plot synopsis ==
The story revolved around the second coming of Jesus Christ as a superhero who looked like popular British television personality Jonathan Ross. This superhero, called The Saviour, has set out to change the world for the better. However The Saviour is the antichrist and plans to take over the world with the aid of a satanic cult devoted to him. The only thing which could stop him is the presence of the real Son of God and much of the story involves The Saviour's attempts to track his foe down. Eventually it is discovered that the foe is an angel and not the real Son of God. The Saviour kills him thinking he has won, but there is another super powered being on Earth unknown to The Saviour.

== Collected editions ==
A trade paperback collection was released, which collected the first five issues.
