= Journey: The Adventures of Wolverine MacAlistaire =

American comic book series

- Cover of issue #1 of the original series

Publication information
- Publisher: Aardvark-Vanaheim; Fantagraphics
- Schedule: Monthly
- Publication date: Mar. 1983 – Apr. 1986
- No. of issues: 27
- Main character(s): Joshua "Wolverine" MacAlistaire

Creative team
- Created by: William Messner-Loebs

Collected editions
- The Journey Saga Volume One: Tall Tales: ISBN 0-930193-28-8
- Journey: The Adventures of Wolverine MacAlistaire, Vol. 1: ISBN 1-60010-191-7
- Journey: The Adventures of Wolverine MacAlistaire, Vol. 2: ISBN 1-60010-351-0

Journey: The Adventures of Wolverine MacAlistaire is an independent comic book created by William Messner-Loebs about Michigan frontier life in the 19th century. An ensemble piece, it tells the story of the Fort Miami settlement and the characters, both real and fictional, that occupy it. Among these is the title character, Joshua "Wolverine" MacAlistaire.

== Publishing history ==
Journey was first published as a back-up feature in Cerebus #48 and #49 from Aardvark-Vanaheim, then as a title unto its own, starting with issue #1 in Mar./Apr. 1983. The 13th issue features an intercompany crossover with Jim Valentino's normalman. After fourteen issues, the series moved to Fantagraphics, which published an additional thirteen issues.

Fantagraphics collected the Cerebus back-up features along with the first four issues as Tall Tales (January 1987), and included a Journey story in Anything Goes! #5 (Oct. 1987). A sequel to the original series, Journey: Wardrums (Fantagraphics, 1987–1990), was billed as a six-issue mini-series, but only two issues were published.

A new Journey story was included in the one-shot Many Happy Returns (published by About Comics) in 2008.

In July 2008, IDW Publishing released a trade paperback collecting the first 16 issues. In 2009, a second volume was released, containing the next ten issues.
