= Brave Old World (comics) =

Brave Old World is a four issue comic book miniseries published by Vertigo Comics. It is about a group of computer hackers who at the turn of the year 2000 are working on a solution to the Y2K bug when they are transported back in time a hundred years to 1900. The series follows their adventures as they try to build a computer using the technology of the time, in order to make their way back to their own time.

The first issue came out in February 2000. The story is by William Messner-Loebs, and the artwork by Guy Davis and Phil Hester.
