= Trident submarine =

Trident submarine may refer to the following classes of submarine:

- Ohio-class submarine of the U.S. Navy, armed with Trident Ballistic Missiles (SSBN) or Cruise Missiles (SSGN)
- Vanguard-class submarine of the Royal Navy, armed with Trident Ballistic Missiles
