= Beautiful Stories for Ugly Children: A Cotton Candy Autopsy =

Comic book series

- Beautiful Stories for Ugly Children, vol. 1 (June 1989)

Publication information
- Publisher: DC Comics under the Piranha Press imprint
- Format: Ongoing series
- Publication date: June 1989 - September 1992
- No. of issues: 30

Creative team
- Written by: Dave Louapre
- Artist: Dan Sweetman

Beautiful Stories for Ugly Children is a comic book series written by Dave Louapre and illustrated by Dan Sweetman, published by DC Comics through their Piranha Press imprint from June 1989 until September 1992. The series saw a total of 30 issues. A trade paperback, titled A Cotton Candy Autopsy, reprinted issues #1 and #13, and concluded the story told in those issues with a previously unpublished third part.

The promotional material said that the title would be restarting in a 128-page quarterly anthology format with the first issue being titled, What If This Were Heaven, Wouldn't That Be Hell?. Despite the plan to continue publishing in this format, this would actually be the final Beautiful Stories for Ugly Children story to be released.

An image from A Cotton Candy Autopsy was used as the cover for Mr. Bungle's debut album.

== Original series ==
- Issue #1: A Cotton Candy Autopsy
- Issue #2: The Dead Johnsons' Big Incredible Day
- Issue #3: Diary of a Depressed Tap Dancer
- Issue #4: The Black Balloon
- Issue #5: The Crypt of The Magi
- Issue #6: Happy Birthday to Hell
- Issue #7: Ricky The Doughnut Boy
- Issue #8: Die Rainbow Die
- Issue #9: By The Light of The Screaming Moon
- Issue #10: Where The Tarantulas Play
- Issue #11: The Daffodils of Plague Town
- Issue #12: Beneath The Useless Universe
- Issue #13: A Cotton Candy Autopsy II - Bingo And Addy's Escape
- Issue #14: Dangerous Prayers
- Issue #15: The Pagan Tourist
- Issue #16: The Santas of Demotion Street
- Issue #17: A Conspiracy of Sweaters
- Issue #18: The Neutered Beast
- Issue #19: Nice Girls Don't Massacre Ants
- Issue #20: Arnold: Confessions of a Blood Junkie
- Issue #21: Dances With Cows
- Issue #22: Psychotronic Virgin
- Issue #23: Tiny Slimy, Writhing Thing
- Issue #24: I Am Paul's Dog
- Issue #25: Legion of Ogs
- Issue #26: Dead Like Me
- Issue #27: The No-Wax Killing Floor
- Issue #28: The Guilty Orphan
- Issue #29: Gravity Sucks
- Issue #30: The Dream is Dead - Gone, Shot Off, All Squashed Flat
- A Cotton Candy Autopsy trade paperback
- What If This Were Heaven, Wouldn't That Be Hell?
- Ashcan - collects twelve pages of What If This Were Heaven, Wouldn't That Be Hell?
