= Bo Brown =

American cartoonist (1906–1996)

Robert Franklin Brown (July 2, 1906 – August 23, 1996) was an American cartoonist. His work appeared in such places as The Saturday Evening Post, The New Yorker, and some six hundred other publications. He also produced the syndicated comic strip Such Is Life in 1936.

== Career ==
Brown graduated from the University of Pennsylvania in 1928. Bo Brown was a law student at Penn when he sold two cartoons to the Saturday Evening Post, earning more money than fledgling lawyers could expect in 1930. So he took a leave of absence from Penn Law and proceeded, with the aid of his wife, Marge, to sell more than 35,000 cartoons to national, regional and local publications over the next 65 years. Brown's cartoons were reprinted in Europe, Asia, and South America and he also created illustrations that appeared in about 20 books. It has been said that his work is just as good today as it was 50 years ago. Brown stated that cartooning was "a relaxed life".

Before his life in the art world, Brown served in the U.S. Coast Guard Reserve, the Office of War Information during World War II.

== Awards ==
Bo received the National Cartoonist Society Gag Cartoon Award for 1981. Highlights for Children also named one of his works "Cartoon of the Year".

== Personal life ==
Brown was married to his wife Margaret for 64 years. He died in August 1996 from pneumonia and heart failure at Abington Memorial Hospital. He lived in Jenkintown, Pennsylvania.
