= Trishul (disambiguation) =

Trishul may refer to:

- Exercise Trishul, military sub-exercises
- INS Trishul (F43), a frigate
- Operation Trishul, an anti-insurgency operation
- Trishul (film) Indian film
- Trishul (missile) a missile

== See also ==
- Trishula (disambiguation)
