= Kane (comics) =

Comic book series by Paul Grist

- Cover of the first issue

Publication information
- Publisher: Dancing Elephant Press
- Publication date: Apr. 1993 – June 2001
- No. of issues: 31
- Main character: Kane

Creative team
- Created by: Paul Grist
- Written by: Paul Grist
- Artist: Paul Grist

Kane is a comic book series created, written and drawn by Paul Grist and self-published through Dancing Elephant Press. Grist put out 31 issues of Kane from 1993 to 2001.

== Overview ==
Kane concerns a police detective who works in the 39th precinct of the fictional American city of New Eden, which seems to be located on the West Coast. Despite being a UK citizen, Grist appears to have modeled New Eden and its police force in the style of American cop shows such as Hill Street Blues and NYPD Blue. Another clear influence is the work of Frank Miller, particularly his Sin City comics. Cerebus was another formative influence, particularly because it proved to Grist that self-published comics were a viable proposition; the first issue of Cerebus that Grist read was #39, hence the designation of Kane's precinct.

Kane has a difficult relationship with his co-workers due to a violent encounter with his former partner, which unfolds gradually and in flashback during the series. Police corruption is a recurring theme. Kane is also densely intertextual and brims with references to popular culture, particularly characters from British television, comics, and films.

Since the end of 2001 Grist has concentrated on his superhero character Jack Staff, although he has announced plans to continue Kane as a series of original graphic novels.

== Reception ==
Kane won the 1998 National Comics Award for Best Self-Published/Independent comic.

Flashback with his former partner

== Collections ==
Kane has been collected in the following trade paperbacks from Image Comics:

Title	Material collected	ISBN
Kane vol. 1: Greetings from New Eden	Kane #1–4	ISBN 1-58240-340-6
Kane vol. 2: Rabbit Hunt	Kane #5–8	ISBN 1-58240-355-4
Kane vol. 3: Histories	Kane #9–12	ISBN 1-58240-382-1
Kane vol. 4: Thirty Ninth	Kane #13–18	ISBN 1-58240-422-4
Kane vol. 5: The Untouchable Rico Costas and Other Short Stories	Kane #19–25 and others	ISBN 1-58240-551-4
Kane vol. 6: Partners	Kane #24–29, 31	ISBN 1-58240-704-5
