= Bacchus (character) =

- Cover of Bacchus #1, published by Harrier Comics' New Wave imprint.

Publication information
- Publisher: Harrier Comics; Dark Horse Comics; Trident Comics; Atomeka; Eddie Campbell Comics
- First appearance: Deadface #1 (March 1987)
- Created by: Eddie Campbell

In-story information
- Alter ego: Dionysus
- Species: God of Olympus
- Place of origin: Mount Olympus
- Team affiliations: Greek gods
- Partnerships: Joe Theseus; The Eyeball Kid; Simpson
- Notable aliases: Deadface

Bacchus a.k.a. Deadface is a comics character created by Eddie Campbell and based upon the Roman god of wine and revelry, known to the Greeks as Dionysus. In this incarnation, Bacchus is one of the few Greek gods who have survived to the present day, and is now an elderly barfly wandering the world telling stories about "the old days."

In his introduction to one of the Bacchus collections, writer Neil Gaiman explains that the series "mixes air hijacks and ancient gods, gangland drama and legends, police procedural and mythic fantasy, swimming pool cleaners and the classics. It shouldn’t work, of course, and it works like a charm."

== Publication history ==
Bacchus first appeared as a character in Deadface (March 1987), a Harrier Comics title which lasted eight issues. In issue #5 Campbell spun the character out of that book and into his own comic, the eponymous Bacchus, a book that lasted two issues, focusing the Deadface comic on Joe Theseus, an updated version of Theseus. When Harrier Comics ceased publication, Campbell managed to sell stories containing the character to numerous publishers; the American publisher Dark Horse, where the character appeared in their anthology title Dark Horse Presents, and who also collected the Deadface comics in the Deadface: Immortality Isn't Forever collection published November 1990; and two British publishers, Trident Comics, where the stories appeared in their black-and-white anthology, Trident, and Atomeka, appearing in A1, another black-and-white anthology.

Dark Horse then collected these short stories and serialized them in comic book form as the three-issue mini-series Deadface: Doing the Islands with Bacchus (1991), as well as serializing the adventures of another character from the mythos, The Eyeball Kid (grandson of Argus "all eyes"), in the Dark Horse anthology Cheval Noir, which was later extended and repackaged as a three-issue mini-series, The Eyeball Kid in 1992.

After these collections and repackaging, Dark Horse commissioned the new storyline, Deadface: Earth, Water, Air, & Fire, a four-issue mini-series published in 1992. Following this in May 1993 came 1,001 Nights of Bacchus, a single-issue comic book compilation of various other previously uncollected storylines which Campbell had placed with various publishers but which he had also created within a unified framing sequence.

The next storylines related to the Bacchus mythos were again serialized, this time in Dark Horse Presents as Hermes vs the Eyeball Kid (1993-1994) and The Picture of Doreen Grey (1995), the former also collected as a three-issue mini-series in 1994-1995.

The final work in the Bacchus mythos to be published by Dark Horse was also the first time Bacchus appeared within a comic published in color, The Ghost in the Glass, published in 1995. At this point Campbell decided to self-publish his own comic, Eddie Campbell's Bacchus, in which he published two new storylines featuring Bacchus, King Bacchus and Banged Up, while concurrently revising and reprinting the material already published, and also adding new stories to the 1,001 Nights of Bacchus sequence. The Bacchus character's stories came to an end after the Banged Up storyline, and although Campbell eventually finished the reprinting of the previously published material, he continued publishing Eddie Campbell's Bacchus, updating the name to Eddie Campbell's Bacchus Magazine to reflect the growing number of text pieces he was running, before canceling the book with issue #60.

Campbell also published these revised storylines in the graphic novel format in collaboration with the publisher Top Shelf.

=== Creators ===
Campbell worked with numerous collaborators on the many series and appearances Bacchus made, beginning with Phil Elliott, whom Campbell approached to color the Deadface and Bacchus covers.

Ed 'Ilya' Hillyer worked as inker on the last four issues of Deadface, before taking full art chores on The Eyeball Kid series initially serialized in Cheval Noir.

Wes Kublick collaborated with the writing on some of the short stories which made up Deadface: Doing the Islands with Bacchus, and Stephen Bissette, Phil Elliott and Pete Mullins collaborated on the art on other stories in this sequence. (Mullins helping to redo Elliott's story, which was reworked and retitled.)

Kublick again helped Campbell with the writing on the first two issues of the Deadface: Earth, Water, Air, & Fire series.

1,001 Nights of Bacchus saw collaborations on the writing front with Kublick, Marcus Moore, Daren White, and Mark Campbell, with Mark Campbell also writing one story in this sequence solely. Artistic collaborators on this sequence were Steve Stamatiadis, Dylan Horrocks, and Pete Mullins, who all collaborated on one story each.

Hermes vs. The Eyeball Kid is credited as being written by Campbell and Kublick, and drawn by Campbell, Mullins, and April Post, with Mullins, again assisting with the art on the latter two-thirds of The Picture of Doreen Grey. The Ghost in the Glass featured art by Teddy Kristiansen.

Mullins again assisted on King Bacchus, with another credit for April Post on part 9. The final serial, Banged Up, saw Marcus Moore again assist with some of the stories and Mullins assist on almost all of the art with a little help from Steve Francis on part 8.

== Other notable characters ==
Notable characters within Eddie Campbell's Bacchus mythos include:

- Joe Theseus
- The Eyeball Kid
- Hermes
- Simpson
- Big Ginny
- Collage
- The Stygian Leech
- The Telchines

== Collected editions ==
- Bacchus Vol 1: Immortality Isn't Forever (Dark Horse Comics, 1990) ISBN 0-9585783-6-2
- Bacchus Vol 2: The Gods of Business (with Ed Hillyer, 1996) ISBN 0-9585783-1-1
- Bacchus Vol 3: Doing the Islands with Bacchus (1997) ISBN 0-9585783-7-0
- Bacchus Vol 4: The Eyeball Kid - One Man Show (with Ed Hillyer, 1998) ISBN 0-9585783-2-X
- Bacchus Vol 5: Earth, Water, Air, Fire (with Wes Kublick, 1998) ISBN 0-9585783-0-3
- Bacchus Vol 6: The 1001 Nights of Bacchus (2000)
- Bacchus Vol 7/8: The Eyeball Kid Double Bill (with Wes Kublick, 2002)
- Bacchus Vol 9: King Bacchus (with Pete Mullins, 1996) ISBN 0-9585783-8-9
- Bacchus Vol 10: Banged Up (with Pete Mullins and Marcus Moore, 2001) ISBN 978-0-95778-962-3
- Bacchus Omnibus Edition Volume One (2015) ISBN 978-1-60309-026-1
- Bacchus Omnibus Edition Volume Two (2016) ISBN 978-1-60309-027-8
