= Epicurus the Sage =

Graphic novel by William Messner-Loebs and Sam Kieth

- Volume 1 of Epicurus the Sage (1989), pencils and inks by Sam Kieth

Publication information
- Publisher: Piranha Press
- Schedule: Biennial
- Format: Graphic novel
- Publication date: 1989–1991
- No. of issues: 2

Creative team
- Created by: William Messner-Loebs; Sam Kieth
- Written by: William Messner-Loebs
- Penciller: Sam Kieth
- Inker: Sam Kieth
- Colorist: Steve Oliff

Collected editions
- Epicurus the Sage: ISBN 1-4012-0028-1

Epicurus the Sage is a two-issue limited series graphic novel, written by William Messner-Loebs, with art by Sam Kieth. The two issues were published in 1989 and 1991 by Piranha Press, the "alternative comics" imprint of DC Comics.

== Plot ==
Ancient Greek philosopher Epicurus appears as the main character of the book, traveling the ancient world with Plato and Aristotle's young pupil Alexander the Great, sometimes with Aristotle himself. Together, they wander into various major Greek myths (e.g. the kidnapping of Persephone by Hades), and discuss the philosophical questions raised, with a great deal of slapstick humor.

The book mixes history, mythology, and humor to relate the teachings of Epicurus. The narrative tends to anachronistically show other vaguely contemporary writers and thinkers, such as Aesop (who died two centuries before the historical Epicurus was even born), as backwards, foolish, fascistic, or all three, while the philosophy of Epicurus is portrayed to be more tolerant and humanistic; it is pointed out more than once that Epicurus is one of the only ancient philosophers who would teach women.

Various notable personages, from both history and mythology (e.g. Alcibiades and Zeus), appear as secondary characters.

== Issues and reprints ==
The original run of the comic consisted of two issues:

- #1 – Visiting Hades (1989)
- #2 – The Many Loves of Zeus (1991)

=== Collected editions ===
In 2003, both books of the series were reprinted in a trade paperback (ISBN 1-4012-0028-1) by Cliffhanger, an imprint of WildStorm. This book featured a new painted cover by Sam Kieth, a black and white "Epicurus" story from Fast Forward #3, and an all new 36-page Epicurus story by Kieth and Messner-Loebs.
