= On a Silver Platter =

- Story code: H 89068
- Story: Don Rosa
- Ink: Don Rosa
- Hero: Scrooge McDuck
- Pages: 10
- Layout: 4 rows per page
- Appearances: Scrooge McDuck; Donald Duck; Magica De Spell
- First publication: December 26, 1989

"On a Silver Platter" is a Scrooge McDuck comic by Don Rosa, first published in Uncle Scrooge Adventures #20 in March 1990.

== Plot ==
Scrooge McDuck receives a silver platter for his Number One Dime, as a gift from an anonymous admirer. Pleased at this, Scrooge places the dime on the platter. This turns out to be a trap set by Scrooge's old enemy Magica De Spell: the platter is in fact a magical teleportation device, connected to an identical one in Magica's house at Mount Vesuvius, Italy. As soon as Scrooge places his dime on the platter, it disappears and reappears at Magica's house, where she easily steals it. Magica has forgotten to turn the spell off after stealing the dime, so Scrooge and Donald soon catch wind of the plot: whatever they place on the platter instantly appears at Magica's house, and vice versa. Thus they begin to use Magica's spell against her, creating all sorts of havoc to keep Magica from melting the coin down into a magical amulet: first (a part of) Donald runs around Magica's house, randomly crashing into things, then Scrooge fires a cannon into Magica's house, and Donald uses a fire extinguisher to spray Magica with. Finally, Scrooge threatens to flood Magica's house with seawater unless she surrenders and gives up the dime. Magica does, but with a parting gift: a whole boxful of foof bombs.

Over the radio, the two detectives assigned by Scrooge to watch Magica's hut, cheerfully report that everything is fine and Magica has never left her home. Scrooge, coughing on smoke from the foof bombs, says they're both fired.

== Trivia ==
Rosa mentions that he finds this story particularly funny because Scrooge and Magica engage in full-scale combat without either of them ever leaving their home. It was only after Rosa completed and published this story that he remembered his old mentor Carl Barks had used a similar concept of a teleportation device in his 1961 story Stranger than Fiction, published in Walt Disney's Comics and Stories #249.
