= Trident Comics =

Defunct British comic book publishing company

- Founded: 1989
- Defunct: 1992
- Country of origin: United Kingdom
- Headquarters location: Leicester
- Key people: Martin Skidmore; Neil Gaiman, Eddie Campbell, Grant Morrison, Mark Millar, Paul Grist, Nigel Kitching, Phil Elliott
- Publication types: Comics
- Owner: Neptune Distribution

Trident Comics was a short-lived comic book publishing company based in Leicester, UK. Specialising in black-and-white comics created by new British talent, it was formed in 1989 as an offshoot of the comics distributor/wholesaler Neptune Distribution, and went out of business in 1992 when Neptune was acquired by a competitor.

== History ==
Trident Comics' aim was to provide creator-owned opportunities for not just established talent such as Neil Gaiman, Eddie Campbell and Grant Morrison, but new talent such as Mark Millar, Paul Grist and Dominic Regan. Trident Comics's main editor was Martin Skidmore, a British comics enthusiast who had been previously best known for editing the fanzine Fantasy Advertiser, a title which Neptune/Trident agreed to continue publishing when Skidmore joined the company.

The company's first release, in early 1989, was the Trident Sampler, a 32-page free sampler issue featuring previews from forthcoming titles. This was followed shortly afterward by Trident #1. Trident was an anthology title, and its first issue featured work such as Eddie Campbell's Bacchus, Neil Gaiman and Nigel Kitching's The Light Brigade and Grant Morrison and Paul Grist's St. Swithin's Day.

Trident proved successful and was followed shortly afterward by Saviour #1 by Mark Millar and Daniel Vallely. This was Millar's first published work and again proved successful for Trident Comics. In 1989, Trident Comics also launched The Saga of the Man-Elf (created by Michael Moorcock) as well as Fantasy Advertiser on a bi-monthly basis. However, this success was tempered by criticism of titles shipping late, something which began to affect its titles more and more.

In 1990, Trident Comics released its best-known title, the collected and recoloured St. Swithin's Day by Morrison and Grist. It proved controversial due to its subject matter, which had to do with a British teenager's fantasy about assassinating Prime Minister Margaret Thatcher. Questions were asked about the comic in the House of Commons, it quickly sold out, and it was one of the few titles Trident sent to a second printing.

After this success, 1990 saw more titles such as Paul Grist's Burglar Bill, Mark Millar and Andrew Hope's, The Shadowmen, and Eddie Campbell and Phil Elliott's Lucifer.

Many of these titles suffered from the late shipping which had been a problem previously with the company. This affected sales greatly as well as the reputation of Trident Comics. Another factor was Neptune's late 1990 formation of the imprint Apocalypse Ltd (whose main title was the weekly Toxic!). This expansion of the publishing line stretched all of Neptune's companies to their limit; as a result, Trident didn't publish anything after 1991.

Eventually, in 1992 Neptune Distribution went bankrupt and was acquired by the American competitor Diamond Comics Distributors, which spelled the end for both Trident and Apocalypse.

Several Trident Comics titles did find new publishers, including St. Swithin's Day (Dark Horse Comics) and Bacchus (multiple subsequent publishers), but many did not and remained unpublished.

== Titles ==
- Black Dog by Nigel Kitching (1 issue, July 1990)
- Bug Hunters by Jerry Paris with Pedro Henry and Garry Leach (One-shot) — collecting 1985–1987 material from Computer and Video Games magazine
- Burglar Bill by Paul Grist (1 issue, 1990)
- Fantasy Advertiser (Nov. 1988–1989; 1991)
- The Light Brigade, by Neil Gaiman and Nigel Kitching (1 issue, Aug. 1989) — collecting material originally published in the Trident anthology
- Lucifer by Eddie Campbell and Phil Elliott (2 issues, 1990)
- The Saga of the Man-Elf (5 issues, 1989–1990), created by Michael Moorcock
- Norman Spittall (one-shot, 1991)
- St. Swithin's Day by Grant Morrison and Paul Grist (1 issue, Apr. 1990) — collecting material originally published in the Trident anthology
- Saviour, by Mark Millar and Nigel Kitching (six issues, 1989–1991) — a trade paperback collecting issues 1-5 was also released.
- The Shadowmen, by Mark Millar and Andrew Hope (2 issues, 1990)
- Strand (2 issues, 1991) — horror series
- Trident (8 issues, 1989–1990) — comics anthology
