= Trident (UK comics) =

British comics anthology

Publication information
- Publisher: Trident Comics
- Schedule: Bi-monthly
- Format: Ongoing series
- Publication date: August 1989 – October 1990
- No. of issues: 8

Creative team
- Written by: Neil Gaiman; Eddie Campbell; Mike Collins; Robin Laing; Gavin Butler; Grant Morrison; Dominic Regan; Mark Millar; Darryl Cunningham; Shane Oakley; Denny Derbyshire; Andrew Hope; Dave Weir
- Artist(s): Nigel Kitching; Eddie Campbell; Pete Martin; Steve Martin; Paul Grist; Dominic Regan; Darryl Cunningham; Gary Crutchley; Denny Derbyshire; D'Israeli; Billy Armstrong
- Editor(s): Martin Skidmore

Trident is an anthology comic series published by Trident Comics from 1989 to 1990.

== Publication history ==
It was the flagship title of Trident Comics and attempted to publish new talent as well as established talent such as Neil Gaiman and Grant Morrison.

Although the title initially proved popular, sales flagged when issues shipped late, and it eventually ceased publication in 1991, with the bankruptcy of Trident Comics.

== Stories ==
Notable stories include:

- Bacchus by Eddie Campbell
- The Light Brigade by Neil Gaiman and Nigel Kitching
- St. Swithin's Day by Grant Morrison and Paul Grist
