= The Dance of Lifey Death =

Graphic novel

- The Dance of Lifey Death (January 1994)
- Date: January 1994
- Series: Alec
- Publisher: Dark Horse Comics

Creative team
- Writers: Eddie Campbell
- Artists: Eddie Campbell

The Dance of Lifey Death is a graphic novel created by Eddie Campbell and published by Dark Horse Comics.
