= Eddie Campbell =

British comics artist and cartoonist

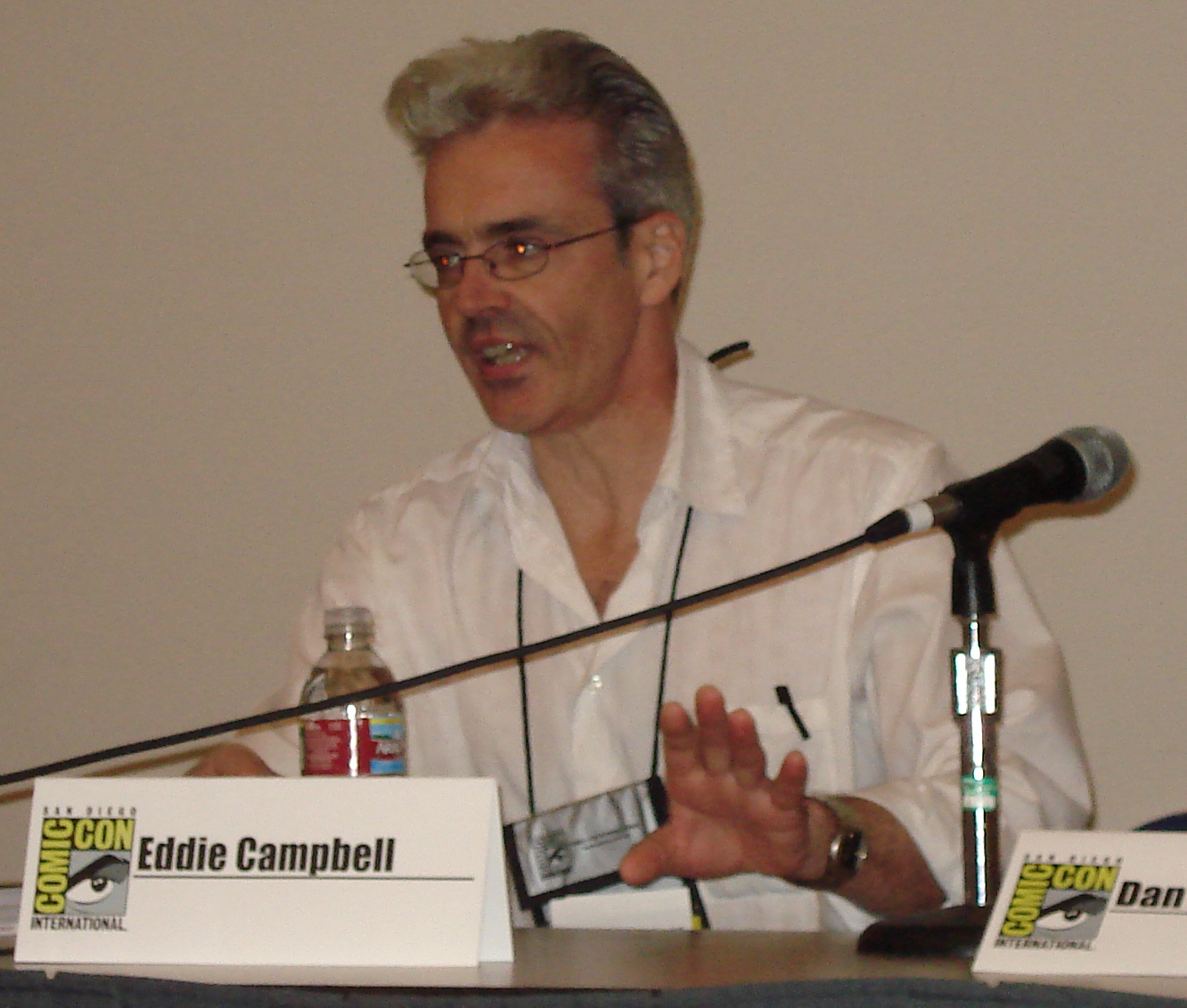
- Eddie Campbell at the 2008 San Diego Comicon
- Born: 10 August 1955 (age 71) Glasgow, Scotland, UK
- Area: Artist
- Notable works: Bacchus; From Hell; Alec
- Awards: UK Comic Art Award, 1991; Eisner Award, 1993, 2000; Harvey Award, 1995; Ignatz Award, 1997, 2010; Inkpot Award, 1998; Eagle Award, 2000
- Spouse: Audrey Niffenegger
- Children: 3

Eddie Campbell (born 10 August 1955) is a British comics artist and cartoonist. He was the illustrator and publisher of From Hell (written by Alan Moore), and the creator of the semi-autobiographical Alec stories collected in Alec: The Years Have Pants, and Bacchus (a.k.a. Deadface), a wry adventure series about the few Greek gods who have survived to the present day.

His scratchy pen-and-ink style is influenced by the impressionists, illustrators of the age of "liberated penmanship" such as Phil May, Charles Dana Gibson, John Leech and George du Maurier, and cartoonists Milton Caniff and Frank Frazetta (particularly his Johnny Comet strip). Campbell's writing has been compared to that of Jack Kerouac and Henry Miller.

Campbell has won almost every award the comics industry bestows, including the Eisner Award, the Harvey Award, the Ignatz Award, the Eagle Award, and the UK Comic Art Award.

== Biography ==
=== Alec and other autobiographical work ===
Alec: The King Canute Crowd by Eddie Campbell

Campbell made his earliest attempts at autobiographical comics in the late 1970s with In the Days of the Ace Rock 'n' Roll Club (1978–1979). This evolved into Alec, with the character of Alec MacGarry standing in for the author. Campbell self-published these early comics in the amateur press association BAPA and then as short-run photocopied pamphlets in London in the early 1980s, selling them at conventions and comic marts and via Paul Gravett's "Fast Fiction" market stall. When Gravett founded Escape Magazine, Campbell was one of the artists featured.

In 1984 Escape published Alec, a slim collection of his semi-autobiographical stories. This was followed by two further collections, Love and Beerglasses (1985) and Doggie in the Window (1986).

While in Australia (where he moved in 1986), Campbell published a number of comics with the new British publisher Harrier Comics. These included the one-shots By The Time I Get To Wagga Wagga (1987), and Ace (1988), as well as his first Bacchus comics (see below). With Glenn Dakin and Phil Elliott, he helped found Harrier's alternative-flavored New Wave imprint.

In 1990 all three Alec volumes were collected, together with some unpublished material, as The Complete Alec by Acme Press/Eclipse Comics. The collection won the 1991 UK Comic Art Award for Best Graphic Novel Collection. In 2000 this material was republished as The King Canute Crowd.

Two further slim volumes, The Dead Muse (1990) and Little Italy (1991) appeared through Fantagraphics Books.

Graffiti Kitchen, which Campbell considers the highpoint of the series, was published by Tundra in 1993, and The Dance of Lifey Death followed in 1994 from Dark Horse Comics.

Campbell then followed up these works by self-publishing two larger works. Alec: How To Be An Artist (2000), a study of the art form and of Campbell's own artistic journey, and After The Snooter (2002), in which Campbell appears to have laid Alec McGarry to rest. Both works were originally serialised within his Bacchus series, but were reworked upon collection. The Fate of the Artist, in which Campbell's family and friends investigate his disappearance, undermining the image of himself he had presented in his previous autobiographical works, was published by First Second Books in 2006. Alec: How to Be an Artist was nominated for the Harvey Award for Best Graphic Album of Previously Published Work in 2000.

In 2007 Campbell spent some time serving as a court illustrator in Australia.

All the Alec stories, with the exception of The Fate of the Artist, were published in one volume, Alec: The Years Have Pants by Top Shelf Productions in 2009 (ISBN 978-1-60309-025-4). this was followed in 2012 by the publication of The Lovely Horrible Stuff (Top Shelf), a continuation of the autobiographical theme which playfully investigates our relationship with money.

=== Bacchus ===
The success of Kevin Eastman and Peter Laird's Teenage Mutant Ninja Turtles led to a short-lived explosion of black and white independent comics in the mid-1980s. Campbell joined in, creating the series Deadface for Harrier Comics, telling the story of Bacchus, god of wine and revelry, and the few other Greek mythological figures who have survived to the present day. Harrier published eight issues of Deadface and two issues of a companion comic, Bacchus. Campbell then began publishing short Bacchus stories in a number of anthologies, such as the British anthology Trident published by Trident Comics, and the American anthology Dark Horse Presents published by Dark Horse Comics. Dark Horse reprinted the Harrier series as Immortality Isn't Forever in 1990 and a selection of the short stories as Doing the Islands With Bacchus in 1991. Campbell continued to produce Bacchus stories for Dark Horse until 1995 as a series of miniseries. The entire Bacchus saga is to be published in two 500-page volumes by Top Shelf Productions (Vol. 1 ISBN 978-1-60309-026-1, Vol. 2 ISBN 978-1-60309-027-8).

=== From Hell ===
Beginning in 1989, Campbell illustrated Alan Moore's ambitious Jack the Ripper graphic novel From Hell, serialised initially in Steve Bissette's horror anthology Taboo. Moore and Bissette chose Campbell as illustrator for his down-to-earth approach which gave the story a convincing realism and did not sensationalise the violence of the murders. After Taboo folded From Hell was published in instalments by Tundra and then Kitchen Sink Press, until the epilogue Dance of the Gull-catchers saw print in 1998.

=== Self-publishing ===
Under the influence of Dave Sim, Campbell founded Eddie Campbell Comics and began self-publishing in 1995, after the film rights to From Hell were optioned. The monthly series Bacchus reprinted and completed the story begun in Deadface, as well as carrying new and reprinted Alec stories. He went on to collect both Alec and Bacchus as a series of graphic novels. He also published the collected edition of From Hell, and comics adaptations of two of Alan Moore's performance art pieces, The Birth Caul and Snakes and Ladders.

After the cancellation of Bacchus, Campbell published two issues of Eddie Campbell's Egomania magazine, in which he began to serialise another work, The History of Humour. Facing an increasingly indifferent market for his work, and the collapse of his US distributor, Campbell ended his publishing imprint in 2003 after releasing the second issue of Egomania.

=== First Second and Top Shelf ===
After his self-publishing ceased, Campbell signed with First Second Books. As well as The Fate of the Artist, a continuation of the Alec series, First:Second published two other works by Campbell. June 2007 saw the publication of The Black Diamond Detective Agency, Campbell's adaptation of an as-yet unmade screenplay by C. Gaby Mitchell. Set in the closing months of 1899, it features the eponymous private detective agency investigating a conspiracy to blow up a train, and their prime suspect's efforts to find the truth.

In January 2008, First Second Books published Campbell's collaboration with Dan Best, The Amazing Remarkable Monsieur Leotard. The work follows the life of circus performers and historical figures as they wander in and out of history. It was enthusiastically received by critics with Ain't It Cool News saying "Something truly amazing and fun does indeed occur in this book."

Campbell's next works were for Top Shelf. 2009 saw the publication of the life sized omnibus Alec: The Years Have Pants. The book collected Campbell's Alec work to date with the exception of Fate of the Artist. the omnibus edition also included new material. In 2010 The Playwright, a collaboration with Daren White, was published. This reworked strips the pair had previously published in the Australian anthology Dee Vee, expanding the scope of the story-line and bringing it to conclusion.

In 2012 Top Shelf published The Lovely Horrible Stuff in collaboration with Knockabout Press, a continuation of Campbell's autobiographical works. Campbell has evolved his art style, using colour, collage and photo-shop to create art which The Guardian describe as having " a surreal, scruffy elegance".

=== iPad ===
A collection of the "Dapper John" stories originally created in the late 1970s, along with an original cover, a new interview and other features, was published as an iPad app in December 2011 by digital publisher Panel Nine. In 2012 Top Shelf released two collections of Campbell's Bacchus series.

== Personal life ==
Campbell moved to Brisbane, Australia in 1986 with his then-wife Annie where he lived for thirty years.

Campbell is married to author and artist Audrey Niffenegger and currently lives in Chicago. Campbell's adult daughter Hayley Campbell (from his previous marriage) is a writer and radio journalist.

== Awards ==
Year	Work	Award	Result	Ref.
1991	The Complete Alec	UK Comic Art Award for Best Graphic Novel Collection	Winner	
1993	"From Hell", Taboo	Eisner Award for Best Serialized Story		
1995	From Hell	Harvey Award for Best Continuing or Limited Series		
1997	From Hell	Ignatz Award for Outstanding Story	Winner	
1999	From Hell	Comics Buyer's Guide Fan Awards for Favorite Reprint Graphic Novel/Album	Winner	
2000	Bacchus	Eagle Award for Favourite Comic (Excluding North American and UK titles)	Winner	
2000	From Hell	Eisner Award for Best Graphic Album — Reprint	Winner	
2000	From Hell	Harvey Award for Best Graphic Album of Previously Published Work		
2000	From Hell	Ignatz Award for Outstanding Story	Finalist	
2000	From Hell: To Hell	Eagle Award for Favourite Trade Paperback/Reprint Collection	Winner	
2003	After the Snooter	Eisner Award for Best Graphic Album — Reprint	Finalist	
2010	Alec: The Years Have Pants (A Life-Sized Omnibus)	Eisner Award for Best Graphic Album — Reprint	Finalist	
2010	Alec: The Years Have Pants (A Life-Sized Omnibus)	Ignatz Award for Outstanding Artist	Winner	

== Bibliography ==
=== Alec ===
- Alec (Escape Publishing, 1984)
- Love and Beerglasses (Escape Publishing, 1985)
- Doggie in the Window (Escape Publishing, 1986)
- By The Time I Get To Wagga Wagga (Harrier Comics, 1987)
- Ace (Harrier/New Wave, 1988)
- The Complete Alec (Acme Press/Eclipse Comics, 1990)
  - republished in 2000 by Eddie Campbell Comics as The King Canute Crowd
- The Dead Muse (Fantagraphics Books, 1990)
- Eddie Campbell in Little Italy (Fantagraphics, 1991)
- In The Days of the Ace Rock 'n' Roll Club (Fantagraphics, 1993) – originally produced in 1978–1979
- Graffiti Kitchen (Tundra Publishing, 1993)
- The Dance of Lifey Death (Dark Horse Comics, 1994)
- Three Piece Suit (Top Shelf Productions, 2001) – collecting Graffiti Kitchen, Little Italy, and The Dance of Lifey Death
- How to be an Artist (Eddie Campbell Comics, 2001)
- After the Snooter (Eddie Campbell Comics, 2002)
- Alec: The Years Have Pants (Top Shelf Productions, 2009) – collecting all of the above, with extra shorts and a new Alec story, "The Years Have Pants"
- The Fate of the Artist (First Second Books, 2006)
- The Lovely Horrible Stuff (Top Shelf Productions / Knockabout Comics, 2012)
- The Second Fake Death of Eddie Campbell (Top Shelf Productions, 2023)

=== Bacchus ===
- Deadface (8 issues, Harrier Comics, April 1987–October 1988)
- Deadface: Doing the Islands with Bacchus (3 issues, Dark Horse Comics, 1991) – mostly reprints of stories from Trident Comics' Trident and Atomeka Press' A1
- The Eyeball Kid (3 issues, Dark Horse, April 1992–June 1992) – reprints of stories from the Dark Horse anthology Cheval Noir
- Deadface: Earth, Water, Air, and Fire (4 issues, Dark Horse, July 1992–October 1992)
- The 1,001 Nights of Bacchus (Dark Horse, May 1993)
- Hermes vs. The Eyeball Kid (3 issues, Dark Horse, December 1994–February 1995) – reprints of stories from Dark Horse Presents
- Eddie Campbell's Bacchus (60 issues, Eddie Campbell Comics, May 1995–May 2001)
- Collected volumes:
  - Vol 1: Deadface: Immortality Isn't Forever (Dark Horse Comics, 1990) – reprints Deadface #1–8
  - Vol 2: The Gods of Business (Eddie Campbell Comics, 1995) – with Ed Hillyer
  - Vol 3: Doing the Islands with Bacchus (Dark Horse Comics, 1991)
  - Vol 4: The Eyeball Kid – One Man Show (Eddie Campbell Comics, 1998) – with Ed Hillyer; reprints from Cheval Noir
  - Vol 5: Earth, Water, Air, Fire (Eddie Campbell Comics, 1998) – with Wes Kublick; reprints from Deadface: Earth, Water, Air, and Fire
  - Vol 6: The 1,001 Nights of Bacchus (Eddie Campbell Comics, 2000) – reprints the 1993 Dark Horse TPB of the same name
  - Vol 7/8: The Eyeball Kid Double Bill Eddie Campbell Comics, 2002) – with Wes Kublick; reprints "The Eyeball Kid" stories from Dark Horse Presents #76-84, 94-99 (Aug. 1993–July 1995)
  - Vol 9: King Bacchus (Eddie Campbell Comics, 1996) – with Pete Mullins
  - Vol 10: Banged Up (Eddie Campbell Comics, 2001) – with Pete Mullins and Marcus Moore
- Bacchus Omnibus Volume 1 (Top Shelf Productions, 2015)
- Bacchus Omnibus Volume 2 (Top Shelf Productions, 2016)

=== Other work ===
- Catalyst: Agents of Change (5 issues, Dark Horse Comics, 1994) – writer, with Pete Ford
- Hellblazer (Vertigo Comics)
  - Issues 85–88 (1995) – writer, with Sean Phillips as artist
  - Issue #250 (2008) – short story artist, with Peter Milligan as writer of "The Curse of Christmas"
- From Hell (originally serialized from 1989 to 1996; Top Shelf Productions, 1999) – with Alan Moore
- The Devils Footprints (Heavy Metal Magazine) 20th Anniversary Hardcover 1997) – with Marcus Moore (script)
- The Spirit: The New Adventures Issue #7; The Pacifist (Kitchen Sink, 1998) – with Marcus Moore (script) and Pete Mullins (art)
- The Birth Caul (Eddie Campbell Comics, 1999) – adaptation of an Alan Moore performance art piece
- Snakes and Ladders (Eddie Campbell Comics, 2001) – with Michael Evans; adaptation of an Alan Moore performance art piece
- Egomania (2 issues, Eddie Campbell Comics, 2002)
- Batman: The Order of Beasts (DC Comics, 2004) – with Daren White
- Captain America: Homeland (Marvel Comics, 2004) – pencils and inks, two-part "Requiem" story with writer Robert Morales and inks by Stewart McKenny
- A Disease of Language (Palmano Bennett / Knockabout Comics, 2005) — hardcover reprinting The Birth Caul and Snakes and Ladders plus miscellany
- The Black Diamond Detective Agency (First Second, 2007)
- The Amazing Remarkable Monsieur Leotard (First Second, 2008)
- The Playwright (Top Shelf / Knockabout, 2010) – with Daren White
- Dapper John:
  - "Dapper John: In the Days of the Ace Rock 'n' Roll Club", iPad app collecting all of the "Dapper John" stories (2011, orig. 1978–c. 1993)
- The From Hell Companion (Top Shelf Productions, 2013) – with Alan Moore
- Bizarre Romance (Abrams, 2018) – with Audrey Niffenegger
- The Goat Getters (IDW and the Library of American Comics, 2018)
- From Hell: Master Edition (colourized and revised; Top Shelf Productions, 2020)
- Kate Carew: America's First Great Woman Cartoonist (Fantagraphics, 2024)

== Notes ==
Preceded by Jamie Delano	Hellblazer writer 1994	Succeeded by Paul Jenkins
