= William Messner-Loebs =

American comic writer

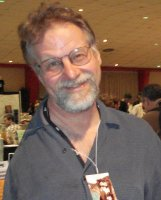
- Messner-Loebs in 2007
- Born: William Francis Loebs, Jr. February 19, 1949 (age 77) Ferndale, Michigan, U.S.
- Areas: Cartoonist, Writer, Penciller, Artist, Inker
- Notable works: The Flash; Journey; Wonder Woman; The Maxx; Jonny Quest
- Awards: Inkpot Award (1987); GLAAD Media Award for Outstanding Comic Book (1992); Macabre Award (2008); Bill Finger Award (2017)

William Francis Messner-Loebs (/ˈmɛznər ˈloʊbz/; born William Francis Loebs Jr., February 19, 1949) is an American comics artist and writer from Michigan, also known as Bill Loebs and Bill Messner-Loebs. His hyphenated surname is a combination of his and his wife Nadine's unmarried surnames.

In the 1980s and 1990s he wrote runs of series published by DC Comics, Image Comics, Comico, and other comics publishers, including DC's superhero series The Flash and Wonder Woman among others. Additionally he has both written and drawn original creator-owned works, such as Journey: The Adventures of Wolverine MacAlistaire.

== Biography ==
William Messner-Loebs was born in Ferndale, Michigan. His right arm was amputated above the shoulder in infancy because of a cancerous tumor; he writes and draws with his left hand.

Loebs was a friend of Kevin Siembieda, and played in Siembieda's role-playing group in Detroit; in 1981, his mother Frances (Schepeler) Loebs loaned Siembieda the money to start publishing role-playing books for his company Palladium Books.

His first comics work was for Power Comics Company and on Noble Comics' Justice Machine with Mike Gustovich. His first ongoing series was Journey: The Adventures of Wolverine MacAlistaire, about 19th-century Michigan frontier life, which he both wrote and illustrated. It was published from 1983 to 1986 by Aardvark-Vanaheim and Fantagraphics, followed by a limited series Journey: Wardrums. He wrote the 31-issue Jonny Quest series published by Comico from 1986 to 1988 and collaborated with artist Adam Kubert on the Jezebel Jade limited series, a spin-off from the Jonny Quest series.

In 1988, he began writing The Flash with issue #15 and continued through #61. He and artist Greg LaRocque introduced Linda Park as a supporting character in the series in The Flash vol. 2 #28 (July 1989). He also reintroduced the Pied Piper as a reformed villain and established the character as gay, in issue #53 (Aug. 1991).

Meanwhile, he wrote Dr. Fate #25–41 and the Jaguar series for DC's Impact Comics imprint. He wrote Epicurus the Sage which was illustrated by Sam Kieth, and scripted The Maxx which was illustrated and co-written by Kieth. In 1990, Messner-Loebs became the writer of the Batman newspaper comic strip and wrote the strip until its cancellation the following year.

In 1992 Loebs took over writing the Wonder Woman series, with pencils by Mike Deodato. During his run from #63 to #100, he created the character Artemis of Bana-Mighdall, for whom he wrote the mini-series Artemis: Requiem. Meanwhile, he wrote Hawkman #9–27, penciled primarily by Steve Lieber. In 1996 he had a brief run writing Marvel Comics' Thor. From 1997 to 1999 he wrote Impulse #29–49, penciled by Craig Rousseau. In 1999 he wrote the "V2K" mini-series Brave Old World for Vertigo, penciled by Guy Davis.

In 2005, following years of limited freelance work and the loss of his and his wife's home in the early 2000s, Messner-Loebs's financial condition was publicized in the local newspaper and comics news sites and Internet message boards. Author Clifford Meth teamed up with artist Neal Adams to create a benefit auction to help Messner-Loebs. The two also created an art tribute book entitled Heroes & Villains with all proceeds aiding Messner-Loebs.

His financial situation improved somewhat, and he had a number of works published, including an issue of Green Arrow in 2005, and several pieces in The Three Tenors (Aardwolf Publishing), which he shared credits for along with Clifford Meth and artist Dave Cockrum. A new "Journey" story was included in the one-shot Many Happy Returns in 2008, and IDW Publishing reprinted the original material in paperback. He has done writing for Boom! Studios, including the four-issue Necronomicon and stories for Zombie Tales. He has done illustration work for the 2007 humor book Chicken Wings for the Beer Drinker's Soul and a monthly cartoon for the Livingston [County, MI] Parent Journal. In 2008, he discussed additional, more substantial new works with various publishers. In 2011, he wrote the DC Retroactive: The Flash – The '80s and DC Retroactive: Wonder Woman – The '90s one-shots.

As of early 2018, William Messner-Loebs and his wife have continued to struggle financially, with Messner-Loebs working two part-time positions in Michigan. In 2019, he co-wrote, with Amy Chu, issues #3–5 of the limited series Kiss: The End for Dynamite Entertainment, and contributed to an independent comic book anthology called YEET Presents.

In September 2020, William Messner-Loebs was named Project Editor for Resurgence Comics.

In 2025, William Messner-Loebs published his comic autobiography Wanderland.

== Awards ==
In 1985, Messner-Loebs was nominated for the Russ Manning Most Promising Newcomer Award. He received an Inkpot Award in 1987 and his Jonny Quest series from Comico was nominated for the Kirby Award for Best Continuing Series and Best New Series that same year. In 1989, Messner-Loebs was nominated for an Eisner Award as Best Writer for Jonny Quest and his Jezebel Jade series was nominated for the Eisner Award for Best Finite Series.

For his work on The Flash, he received the first GLAAD Media Award for Outstanding Comic Book in 1992.

In 2009 he won the Macabre Award for his Necronomicon comic book series. Messner-Loebs received the Bill Finger Award for Writing Excellence in 2017.

=== Awards won ===
- Inkpot Award 1987
- GLAAD Media Award for Outstanding Comic Book 1992
- Macabre Award 2008
- Bill Finger Award 2017

=== Award Finalist ===
- Russ Manning Award (for Most Promising Newcomer) 1985
- Kirby Award Best Black-and-White Series (for Journey) 1985
- Kirby Award Best Black-and-White Series (for Journey) 1986
- Kirby Award Best Continuing Series (for Jonny Quest) 1987
- Kirby Award Best New Series (for Jonny Quest) 1987
- Harvey Award Best Writer (for Jonny Quest) 1988
- Eisner Award Best Writer (for Jonny Quest) 1989
- Eisner Award Best Finite Series (for Jezebel Jade) 1989
- Harvey Award Best Graphic Album (for Epicurus the Sage) 1990
- Harvey Award Best Graphic Album of Original Work (for Wonder Woman: Amazonia) 1998

== Bibliography ==
=== Aardvark-Vanaheim ===
- A–V in 3–D #1 (Journey story) (writer/artist) (1984)
- Cerebus the Aardvark #34–38, 48–49 (backup stories) (writer/artist) (1982–1983)
- Journey: The Adventures of Wolverine MacAlistaire #1–14 (writer/artist) (1983–1984)

=== Aardwolf Productions ===
- Aardwolf #1 (artist, one page) (1994)
- The Uncanny Dave Cockrum... A Tribute (2004)
- The Three Tenors: Off Key (2005)

=== About Comics ===
- Many Happy Returns (Journey story) (writer/artist) (2008)

=== Angry Isis Press ===
- Choices: A Pro-Choice Benefit Comic Anthology for the National Organization for Women #1 (writer/artist) (1990)

=== Approbation Comics ===
- Myriad #3 (writer/artist) (1995)

=== Arrow Comics ===
- The Land of Oz #6 (inker) (1999)

=== A Wave Blue World ===
- Dead Beats 2: London Calling (anthology) (writer) (2021)

=== Boom! Studios ===
- Cthulhu Tales #3, 6, 12 (writer) (2008–2009)
- Necronomicon #1–4 (writer) (2008)
- Zombie Tales: The Series #3, 5 (2008)

=== Bronze Knuckles Magazine ===
- Mousterian Investigations (illustrated prose story) (writer) (2023)

=== Century Comics ===
- Actor Comics Presents #1 (2006)

=== Comico ===
- Jezebel Jade #1–3 (writer) (1988)
- Jonny Quest #1–31 (writer) (1986–1988)
- Primer #3 (artist) (1983)
- Silverback #1–3 (writer/artist) (1989)

=== Cost of Paper Comics ===
- YEET Presents #24, 26–27, 29, 31–34, 36–39, 41–44, 50, 52–53, 59, 61, 66, 68, 72 (2019–2026)
- YEET Presents Special: Loey the Liger and the Wizard's Tower #1 (2021)
- Shamus and Katie #22 (2022)

=== Critical Blast ===
- Wanderland OGN (writer/artist) (2025)

=== Dark Horse Comics ===
- Doc Stearn...Mr. Monster vol. 2 #8 (1991)
- Indiana Jones and the Fate of Atlantis #1–4 (writer) (1991)

=== DC Comics ===
- Action Comics #658 (1990)
- The Adventures of Superman #471 (1990)
- Aquaman Annual #3 (1997)
- Artemis: Requiem #1–6 (1996)
- Brave Old World #1–4 (2000)
- Cartoon Network Block Party #16 (2006)
- Christmas with the Super-Heroes #2 (1989)
- DC Retroactive: The Flash: The '80s #1 (2011)
- DC Retroactive: Wonder Woman: The '90s #1 (2011)
- Doctor Fate vol. 2 #25–37, 39–41 (1991–1992)
- Epicurus the Sage #1–2 (1989–1991)
- Fast Forward #3 (1993)
- The Flash vol. 2 #15–28, 30–61, Annual #2–3, Special #1 (1988–1992)
- The Flash 80-Page Giant #2 (1999)
- Flinch #6 (1999)
- Green Arrow vol. 3 #53 (2005)
- Hawkman #9–17, 19–27, #0, Annual #2 (1994–1995)
- Impact Winter Special #1 (1991)
- Impulse #29–40, 42–49, #1000000, Annual #2 (1997–1999)
- Jaguar #1–14, Annual #1 (1991–1992)
- Justice League America Annual #7 (1993)
- Justice League Europe #9–12 (1989–1990)
- Justice League Quarterly #5, 10–11 (1991–1993)
- Legends of the DC Universe #4–5 (Wonder Woman) (1998)
- Power of the Atom #12–13 (1989)
- The Powerpuff Girls #56 (2005)
- Secret Origins vol. 2 #34, 48, Annual #2 (1988–1990)
- Showcase '94 #7 (1994)
- Speed Force #1 (1997)
- Superman vol. 2 #48 (1990)
- Superman: The Legacy of Superman #1 (1993)
- Wasteland #1–2, 4–6, 8–10, 12, 17–18 (artist) (1987–1988)
- Who's Who in the DC Universe #3 (1990)
- Who's Who: The Definitive Directory of the DC Universe #10 (artist) (1985)
- Wonder Woman vol. 2 #63–64, 66–87, 90–100, #0, Annual #3, Special #1 (1992–1995)
- Wonder Woman: Amazonia #1 (1998)

=== Disney ===
- Disney Adventures (writer) (January 1992)

=== Dynamite Entertainment ===
- KISS: The End #3–5 (writer) (2019)

=== Eclipse Comics ===
- Born to be Wild (anthology) (writer/artist) (1991)
- Doc Stearn...Mr. Monster #1–5 (artist/inker) (1985–1986)

=== Fantagraphics Books ===
- Amazing Heroes #138 ("2nd Annual Swimsuit Issue"), #164 ("Swimsuits '89") (1988–1989)
- Amazing Heroes Swimsuit Special #1 (1990)
- Anything Goes! #5 (Journey story) (writer/artist) (1987)
- The Best Comics of the Decade #1 (1990)
- Dalgoda #7 (Journey backup story) (writer/artist) (1986)
- Dinosaur Rex #2–3 (backup story) (1987)
- Journey: The Adventures of Wolverine MacAlistaire #15–27 (writer/artist) (1985–1986)
- Journey: Wardrums #1–2 (writer/artist) (1987–1990)
- Prime Cuts #8 (writer/artist) (1988)

=== First Comics ===
- Grimjack #12–13 (artist) (1985)

=== Hiero Graphic Publications ===
- Nucleus #1 (writer/artist) (1979)

=== IDW ===
- Hero Comics (anthology) (writer/artist, one page) (2009)

=== Image Comics ===
- Bliss Alley #1–2 (writer/artist) (1997)
- Darker Image #1 (The Maxx story) (writer) (1993)
- Gen¹³/The Maxx one-shot (writer) (1995)
- MaxiMage #2–7 (writer) (1996)
- The Maxx #1–15, 17–20, 22–23 (writer) (1993–1996)

=== Innovation Publishing ===
- Justice Machine Summer Spectacular #1 (1990)
- The Maze Agency Annual #1 (1990)

=== Just Imagine Graphix ===
- Just Imagine Comics and Stories #9 (writer/artist) (1984)

=== Kitchen Sink Press ===
- Bizarre Sex #10 (writer/artist) (1982)
- Images of Omaha #1 (illustration) (1992)

=== Last Gasp ===
- Strip AIDS U.S.A. (anthology) (writer/artist, two pages) (1988)

=== Literacy Volunteers of Chicago ===
- Word Warriors #1 (inker) (1987)

=== Marvel Comics ===
- Cutting Edge: The Hulk #1 (writer) (1995)
- Epic Battles of the Civil War 1–2 (1998)
- Savage Hulk #1 (writer) (1996)
- The Official Handbook of the Marvel Universe Deluxe Edition #2, 9 (penciller) (1985–1986)
- Thor #495–502 (writer) (1996)
- What If...? vol. 2 #82 (writer) (1996)

=== Megaton Publications ===
- A+Plus #5 (writer/artist) (1978)

=== Moonstone ===
- Moonstone Monsters: Witches #1 (2004)
- Moonstone Noir: Bulldog Drummond #1 (2004)

=== Noble Comics ===
- Justice Machine #1–2 (inker), #5, Annual #1 (writer) (1981–1983)

=== Power Comics Company ===
- Cobalt Blue #1 (writer/artist) (1978)
- Power Comics #1–2, 5 (inker) (1977)

=== Rip Off Press ===
- Aesop's Desecrated Morals #1 (artist, one page) (1993)
- Fire Sale (anthology) (writer/artist, one page) (1993)

=== SD Publishing (Robin Snyder) ===
- Tales of the Mysterious Traveler #34 (artist) (2021)

=== Ted Valley ===
- Flint Comix & Entertainment #26–31 (2011)

=== Thorby Comics ===
- Scandals #1 (1999)

=== Weebee Comics ===
- The Aniverse #2 (inker) (1987)

=== Wisconsin Writers Association Press ===
- Human Interest Stuff (2012)

=== Wizard Entertainment ===
- The Maxx #1/2 (writer) (1993)

=== Zenescope Entertainment ===
- Mankind: The Story of All of Us #2 (2011)

Preceded by Mike Baron	The Flash vol. 2 writer 1988–1992	Succeeded by Mark Waid
Preceded by George Pérez	Wonder Woman vol. 2 writer 1992–1995	Succeeded by John Byrne
Preceded by Warren Ellis	Thor writer 1996	Succeeded by Dan Jurgens (in 1998)
