= Paul Grist (comics) =

British comic creator (born 1960)

- Born: 9 September 1960 (age 66) Sheffield, England
- Areas: Writer, Artist
- Notable works: Kane; Jack Staff

Paul Grist (born 9 September 1960) is a British comic book creator, noted for his hard-boiled police series Kane and his unorthodox superhero series Jack Staff.

== Biography ==
Grist was born in Sheffield. His first work was published in the 1980s by DC Thomson and Fleetway. His early work also includes St. Swithin's Day (written by Grant Morrison and published by Trident Comics), Grendel: Devil in Our Midst (written by Steven T. Seagle and published by Dark Horse Comics), and a Judge Dredd adventure, Kinky Boots, authored by Robbie Morrison.

He later founded his own publishing company, Dancing Elephant Press, under which Kane and Jack Staff were first published, but both titles later moved to Image Comics. He also published Burglar Bill under the Dancing Elephant umbrella (May–Nov. 2003, though it had partly appeared in an earlier form published by Trident Comics).

Grist's art is notable for its spare — sometimes stiff — style, heavy use of shadow, and inventive layouts. His writing is marked by a penchant for sudden cuts between events occurring in different time periods, without the gradual transitions common to the comic book medium. Following the structure of Grist's stories can be a challenge, but he provides subtle visual clues to aid the alert reader.

== Bibliography ==
Comics work includes:

- St. Swithin's Day (with Grant Morrison, Trident Comics, 1990) — originally appeared in black and white in Trident (Trident Comics' anthology title) issues #1-4. Trident collected and reprinted it in 1990 in colour. This edition quickly went out of print and for many years it remained out of print as Trident Comics had gone out of business in 1991. Later reprinted by Oni Press in 1998.
- Insiders (with Mark Millar, in Crisis #55-59, 1991)
- Judge Dredd: "Kinky Boots" (with Robbie Morrison, Judge Dredd Mega Special, 1993)
- Kane (Dancing Elephant Press, 1993–present) collected as:
1. New Eden
2. Rabbit Hunt
3. Histories
4. Thirty Ninth
5. The Untouchable Rico Costas & Other Short Stories
6. Partners
- Jack Staff (Image Comics, 2000–2011) collected as:
1. Everything Used to Be Black & White (352 pages, February 2004, ISBN 1-58240-335-X)
2. Soldiers (160 pages, November 2004, ISBN 1-58240-392-9)
3. Echoes Of Tomorrow (200 pages, January 2007, ISBN 1-58240-719-3)
4. Rocky Realities (224 pages, March 2010, ISBN 1-60706-148-1)
- Rift War! (collected Rift War, 128 pages, June 2009, Titan Books, ISBN 1-84856-238-1):
  - "Part One"/"Part Two" (with Simon Furman, in Torchwood Magazine #3-4, 2008)
  - "Dark Times"/"Circles" (script and art, in Torchwood Magazine #7-8, 2008)
  - "The Calm Before"/"The Storm" (script and art, in Torchwood Magazine #11-12, 2008)
- Mudman (Image Comics, 2011–2013)
- Demon Nic (serialized in Judge Dredd Megazine #361-368, 2015-2016)
- The Visitor: How & Why He Stayed (Dark Horse Comics, 2017)
- The Union (script, art by Andrea Di Vito, Marvel Comics, 2020)

== See also ==
- British comics
