= Nigel Kitching =

British comic book writer and artist

- Born: Nigel Craggs Kitching; 29 May 1959 (age 67)
- Areas: Writer and artist
- Notable works: Sonic the Comic

Nigel Craggs Kitching (born 29 May 1959) is a British comic book writer and artist.

He is best known for his work in British comics, especially Sonic the Comic, the premiere UK depiction of Sonic the Hedgehog.

Since 2001, Kitching has lectured at Teesside University.

== Bibliography ==
- Sonic the Comic #4, 6-14, 16, 28, 42-45, 47-57, 64, 67, 69, 71, 73, 75, 81-82, 87-88, 93, 112-113
- 2000 AD #1375, 1387-1395
- Sonic the Poster Mag #7-8
- Sonic the Hedgehog's 900th Adventure (p. 13-18)
- Trident #1-8
- Saviour #1-6
