= Chagrin Falls Popcorn Shop =

Popcorn and candy shop in Ohio, US

Coordinates: 41.4312°N 81.3920°W

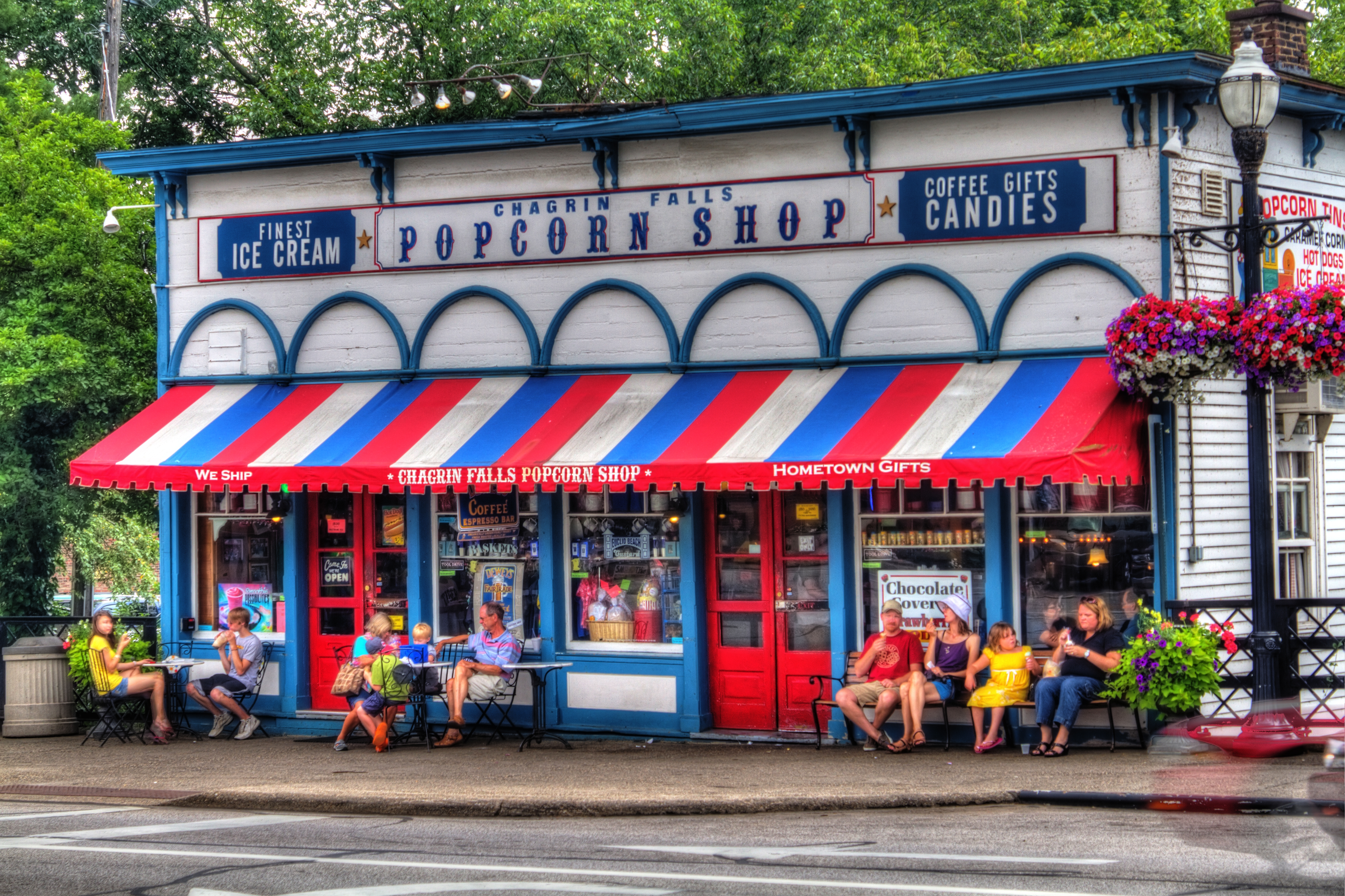
The Chagrin Falls Popcorn Shop in 2010

The Chagrin Falls Popcorn Shop, established in 1875, is a popcorn and candy shop located in the village of Chagrin Falls, Cuyahoga County, Ohio. It was originally established as a retail showcase for The Pride of the Falls flour mill, which was powered by the Chagrin River. The store opened a second location at Shaker Square in 2005.

== Car accident ==
The Popcorn Shop was nearly lost in November 2000. A vehicle crashed into the front of the Popcorn Shop, dislodging it from the bridge it abuts, nearly pushing the whole building into the river. The building was restored from the foundation up.

== Presidential visitor ==
On a stop during his re-election campaign, President George W. Bush visited the Popcorn Shop on September 4, 2004. First lady Laura Bush joined the president for ice cream and purchased several cans of popcorn. Jenna and Barbara Bush accompanied them.

== Calvin and Hobbes ==
Calvin and Hobbes comic strip creator Bill Watterson, originally from Chagrin Falls, depicted a Godzilla-sized Calvin wreaking havoc on Chagrin Falls on the back cover of The Essential Calvin and Hobbes, released in 1988. Calvin is shown carrying the Popcorn Shop.
