= Zen Pencils =

Zen Pencils is an English-language webcomic by Australian cartoonist Gavin Aung Than. Each comic strip adapts the text of an inspirational quote, poem, or book passage.

== History ==
Between 2003 and 2011, Australian cartoonist Gavin Aung Than worked as a graphic designer for Perth's The Sunday Times and Melbourne's Herald Sun. He also created two weekly comic strips: Dan and Pete (a superhero comedy) and Boys Will Be Boys (a dating comedy).

While working at the newspapers, Aung Than began reading biographies for inspiration and questioning his career direction. He later said that his work felt creatively unfulfilling and drew little readership. Finally, he left newspaper design and sold his house, in order to pursue cartooning full-time.

He began adapting quotations from public figures such as Bruce Lee, Muhammad Ali, Carl Sagan, and George Carlin into online comic strips, known as Zen Pencils. By 2013, Zen Pencils had gained widespread attention, following the publication of A Cartoonist's Advice, an adaptation of a college commencement speech by Bill Watterson, creator of Calvin and Hobbes. The comic was partly autobiographical, depicting a man leaving corporate work to become a cartoonist and a stay-at-home father, in a style inspired by Calvin and Hobbes. The strip became the most widely read Zen Pencils comic.

Zen Pencils comics have been translated by readers into Turkish, Portuguese, Spanish, Russian, Chinese, Polish, French, Persian, Hindi, Kannada, and Telugu. In 2013, Zen Pencils was named one of the internet's "Top 100 Websites" by PCMag.

In 2014, Aung Than attended the New York Comic Con to promote the first two Zen Pencils collections. He also attended the Mumbai Film and Comics Convention in India in 2015. Zen Pencils has been featured in international media including The Washington Post, HuffPost, BuzzFeed, Slate, and Gawker.

Aung Than placed the project on hiatus in 2018 to focus on writing and illustrating children's books.

== Influences ==
Aung Than cites Bill Watterson, Jack Kirby, and Chuck Jones's Looney Tunes cartoons as major influences on the visual style of Zen Pencils.

Over time, the Zen Pencils fanbase began submitting quotes, and readers also noted that early Zen Pencils strips tended to focus on white male writers, which Aung Than had not noticed himself: "Growing up in a Western country, that's how you're brought up. All my characters were white. And then a lot of people were saying, ‘Why don't you do more women? Why don't you do more people of colour?’ I was like, ‘That's a good point. I'm a person of colour. Why don't I do more people of colour?’ So that was a good eye-opening experience for me. They taught me what to work on."
