= Dear Mr. Watterson =

- The poster for Dear Mr. Watterson
- Directed by: Joel Allen Schroeder
- Produced by: Chris Browne; Matt McUsic
- Starring: Seth Green; Berkeley Breathed; Stephan Pastis
- Cinematography: Andrew Waruszewski
- Edited by: Joel Allen Schroeder
- Music by: Mike Boggs
- Release date: November 15, 2013
- Running time: 89 minutes
- Country: United States
- Language: English
- Box office: $23,899

Dear Mr. Watterson is a 2013 American documentary film directed by Joel Allen Schroeder, produced by Christopher Browne and Matt McUsic, with Andrew P. Waruszewski as the cinematographer. The film follows the career of Bill Watterson, the author of the comic strip Calvin and Hobbes, and the influence of both the author and the comic strip on the world.

Watterson ended the strip on December 31, 1995, and since then has avoided the public eye.

== History ==
The origin of Dear Mr. Watterson came from Schroeder wanting to understand the cultural impact of Bill Watterson's decade-long comic strip, so he began with a series of fan interviews in December 2007.

Dear Mr. Watterson launched its first Kickstarter campaign on December 15, 2009, ending March 15, 2010. The Kickstarter raised more than 200% of the goal of $12,000. After the first fundraising campaign, the filmmakers interviewed Berkeley Breathed, Lee Salem, Stephan Pastis, Jef Mallett, Dave Kellett, Charles Solomon, Seth Green, Keith Knight, Jenny Robb, Tony Cochran, Andrew Farago (Cartoon Art Museum), Joe Wos (Toonseum), Jean Schulz, Jan Eliot, Bill Amend, and more. In addition, a second Kickstarter campaign was launched in order to fund the finishing of the project. The campaign was successfully funded July 14, 2012.

In late December 2012, the crew shipped nearly 200 posters to backers of their Kickstarter all over the world. The filmmakers submitted their documentary to festivals around the world, and on March 1, 2013, they announced that Dear Mr. Watterson had been accepted into the 37th Annual Cleveland International Film Festival.

== Release ==
Dear Mr. Watterson had its premiere at the Cleveland International Film Festival on April 9, 2013. The film had a limited release and a video on demand release on November 15, 2013.

== Influences and impact ==
The director Joel Schroeder recalls:

At the time, I don't think we realized what it was going to become. We definitely wanted to document the impact of the strip, but then it grew into trying to answer the question of how on earth it had such impact. By digging deeper, it has become a better film.

The film began with Schroeder interviewing fans of the strip to better understand the cultural impact it had. The filmmaker did not seek to interview Watterson knowing his reclusiveness (the artist was invited to the premiere, but watched the DVD instead).

In an interview with NPR's Weekend Edition, Schroeder explained that Watterson's final cartoon exemplified the strip's enduring appeal. Said Schroeder, describing the panel: "It's a fresh layer of snow and Calvin and Hobbes are out with the toboggan, and Calvin looks to Hobbes and says, 'It's a magical world, old buddy ... let's go exploring.' And those last words are just, I think, a challenge to all of us to make sure that we have that curiosity. And words, I think words to live by."

The film was later parodied in an episode of Documentary Now! as "Searching for Mr. Larson", where Fred Armisen portrays a narcissistic filmmaker attempting to find The Far Side creator Gary Larson.
