= Kuznets (surname) =

Kuznets or Kusnets (Russian: Кузнец, meaning "blacksmith") is a gender-neutral Russian surname that may refer to:

- Albert Kusnets (1902–1942), Estonian wrestler
- George Kuznets (1909–1986), Belarusian-American economist
- Lois Rostow Kuznets, American professor of English literature
- Simon Kuznets (1901–1985), American economist, statistician, demographer and economic historian
