= Chagrin Valley Little Theatre =

Community theater in Ohio, United States

Chagrin Valley Little Theatre is a community theater located in Chagrin Falls, Ohio, in the United States. The theater has been in existence since 1930, and is one of the oldest community theaters in the country (the oldest being the Little Theatre of Wilkes-Barre, founded 8 years earlier).

The main CVLT facility includes a main auditorium seating 262 patrons, two group dressing rooms, a small scene shop, and lobby. The second story of the building is known as The Stuart & Roberta Sears River Room, and hosts events before and after performances.

Adjacent to CVLT's main building is The River Street Playhouse, which houses the theatre's props, scenery, costumes. It also holds a smaller 65-seat performance space used as a second stage. This project was founded by former CVLT president Don Edelman along with the building's owner, Steve Shields. The building was acquired by Chagrin Valley Little Theatre as a gift from Mr. Shields' estate upon his passing in 2011.

CVLT's annual season begins in September, and includes approximately eight major productions, including up to three musical theater productions. The season also includes performances by the active Youth Theatre, and special events such as the annual Murder By The Falls fundraiser.

== Notable actors ==
Notable actors who have appeared on the CVLT stage include:

- Tim Conway (Comedic Actor)
- Howard Da Silva (Stage and Screen Actor)
