= Frazz =

Comic strip

- Author: Jef Mallett
- Website: http://gocomics.com/frazz
- Current status/schedule: Running
- Launch date: April 2, 2001
- Syndicate(s): United Feature Syndicate
- Publisher: Andrews McMeel Publishing
- Genre: Slice of Life / Social Satire

Frazz is a syndicated comic strip by Jef Mallett about school custodian Edwin "Frazz" Frazier and the school and students where he works. The strip debuted on April 2, 2001, and as of 2019, appears in over 250 newspapers and is read by tens of thousands online each day.

== Premise and themes ==
In the comic, Edwin "Frazz" Frazier works as a school janitor at Bryson Elementary School. Frazz mentors the students of the school, particularly Caulfield, a genius who hates school because it fails to challenge him.

Mallett has explained that the strip is about discovery, and not merely learning. Frazz's job is just the surface. He reads everything from Milton to Hiaasen to bike racing magazines, he writes, he races, he's an athlete, and he's a songwriter, discovering the value of a day job. When songwriting started going well, he kept his custodian job because it was the perfect environment for discovery through the energy and interest of the students. Many of the characters are based on his childhood experiences at school, and at home as the child of an educator. Frazz is, at least attitudinally, based on Mallett himself. During a 1996 book tour of schools to promote a children's book he wrote and illustrated, Mallett noticed that the kids would not quiet down for their teachers or principals, but would for the school janitor; he or she was "the man", existing on a separate plane between the students and adults.

Mallett says he is influenced by Bill Watterson, George Booth, Jim Borgman, and Garry Trudeau.

In a 2011 interview, Mallet said that his wife, Patty, does the lettering.

== Recurring characters ==
Frazz – The eponymous character, Edwin Frazier, is a thirty-year-old songwriter and janitor of Bryson Elementary. A Renaissance man with endless curiosity, Frazz is always ready to teach children and adults more about the world around them. Because he doesn't look down on them, the students look up to him, and he also has the respect of the adults, with the possible exception of Mrs. Olsen, who remembers what "a handful" he was when he was in the third grade. Drawing inspiration from his daily school life, his songs soon become extremely popular. Frazz no longer needs to work thanks to his hit songs, but keeps working at the school because he loves the kids there. Frazz loves triathlons, bicycling, jogging, swimming, basketball, songwriting, and talking with the students. Among the students, he has a spot in his heart for Caulfield especially, as he is always spurring him to mischief (often unintentionally), and makes excuses for Caulfield's "bored genius" behavior. Mallett describes Frazz as being "me but a lot cooler", saying he is "the voice of reason, the voice of experience and, frequently, the voice of temptation."

Caulfield – An eight-year-old named by his parents after J. D. Salinger's Holden Caulfield. Caulfield is a genius, but hates school because it fails to challenge him. He spends a lot of time in detention for speaking out in class, but whiles away the hours talking with Frazz. Caulfield chooses a literature-themed costume every Halloween, such as Dorian Gray or Gregor Samsa from The Metamorphosis, often stumping most of the teachers but being quickly recognized by Frazz. Mallett regards Caulfield as "the hero of the strip ... He won't give up that joy of learning for the sake of a test score, for quiet approval, for the easy A". Caulfield is African-American, and Mallett says it was a "conscious decision ... to have a Black hero in my strip."

Miss Jane Plainwell – The first-grade teacher at Bryson Elementary, and Frazz's romantic interest. Like Frazz, Miss Plainwell is also an athlete. She inspired 4th-grade teacher Mr. Burke to exercise more often, and trained and ran with him in the Detroit 5K. She majored in journalism, and worked at the sports department of a newspaper, before she decided to teach at Bryson Elementary, wanting to work with a "more mature audience". She has a pet greyhound named "Mario", which she adopted after he retired from racing. Miss Plainwell is modeled on Mallett's wife.

Mr. Burke – Mr. Burke is the fourth-grade teacher at Bryson Elementary, described as one "we all would have loved to see at the front of our classroom". He frequently plays basketball with Frazz, and these games are used in the strip to allow two adults to talk about "relatively adult things" with very little scoring. Burke started out obese, but has slimmed down due to a Frazz-inspired exercise program.

Mrs. Olsen – Mrs. Beatrice Olsen is the third grade teacher at Bryson Elementary, and the teacher from hell. She is frequently the object of tricks and practical jokes by Frazz and Caulfield, and Caulfield's questions/comments in class often drive her to distraction. She had enough of Frazz when he was her student years ago, and would just as soon he leave for good. Another side of her character is seen when Caulfield gets a summer job in her garden (a summer 2005 sequence in Frazz) and they come to have a sense of respect for each other. She has a sibling, as she also has a niece. She is also of Scandinavian (probably Norwegian) descent, as she once cooked lutefisk for her class. She is shown to be a hero at heart with the story arc starting the week of June 17, 2013, although she wants to keep intact her public image of a crusty exterior and unsympathetic attitude. She is a composite of several of Mallett's teachers and one of Mallett's wife's teachers.

Dr. Spaetzle – The African-American principal of Bryson Elementary. Mallet describes him as "frazzled... a good man who's reached his limits... and he aged up into administration." He craves the adoration the students heap on Frazz, and wants to be just like him. He wore nerdy glasses all throughout high school. We learn that he earned a Ph.D. in education.

Coach Hacker – The physical education teacher, interested only in team sports, with no interest in participatory athletics. Coach Hacker was an All-Big 10 defensive end in the 1970s, but now is out-of shape and has been married five times. According to Mallett, he is "dim, a little mean, so closed down", and "doesn't understand Frazz any more than he understands how to work a combination lock". Mallet has intentionally moved to including Coach Hacker very little, saying "every time Hacker showed up, the joke was the same each time... plus with all the CTE brain issues around football, it's not funny."

Mr. Uhrmann – A substitute teacher for Mrs. Olsen who is unflustered by Caulfield. He is described by Frazz as the only one of Caulfield's substitute teachers not to "throw up his hands and quit by 9:30". Caulfield calls him "The Uhrmanator".

Mrs. Trevino – The second-grade teacher at Bryson Elementary. She cooks gorditas for her class every Cinco de Mayo. Mrs. Trevino has been phased away from the strip now that Ms. Plainwell (Mrs. Trevino's former best friend) and Frazz are in a relationship.

Clutch – Frazz's friend & fellow runner/cyclist. Works as an emergency room nurse. Clutch has been phased away from the strip now that Ms. Plainwell and Frazz are in a relationship.

== References to real life ==
Many of the characters or locations in the strip are references to real-life people whom Mallett respects or other aspects of his life. In a 2008 interview, Mallett said that Bryson Elementary is named after one of his favorite authors, Bill Bryson.

- Frazz plays catch with Caulfield on Bobke's Bluff, referencing cyclist Bob Roll.
- Caulfield tells Frazz that Mrs. Olsen believes reports that Elvis was seen working as a barista at the Water Street Coffee Joint in Kalamazoo.
- Frazz once wore a shirt from nearby University of Detroit Jesuit High School.
- In one strip, Frazz and Caulfield visit County Line Lake, which is likely a reference to either County Line Lake in Oakfield, Michigan, or County Line Lake in Locke, Michigan.
- In another strip, Caulfield is wearing a hat with the logo of the Detroit Red Wings on it.

== Comparisons to Calvin and Hobbes ==
Because of similarities in calligraphic style, Frazz's physical appearance, station in life as a brilliant underachiever, and his age relative to Calvin of Calvin and Hobbes, jokes and rumors arose that Mallett was actually Bill Watterson. In a May 2006 series of strips, Frazz and Caulfield invent a game called "Bedlamball" that, like "Calvinball", has no apparent rules or scoring. Mallett was flattered by the comparison and acknowledges Watterson's influence, but denies that he is Watterson or that Frazz is intended as a copy or replacement of, or sequel to, Calvin and Hobbes. In the foreword to Live at Bryson Elementary, Washington Post columnist Gene Weingarten wrote, "[The critics are] focusing not only on hair (Frazz's frizz), but also on his station in life: a brilliant underachiever. Well, Jef assures me that any similarity is unintentional."

In a piece praising the strip, Los Angeles Times columnist Charles Solomon said, "The humor and calligraphic drawing in 'Frazz' reflect Watterson's influence, but the strip doesn't feel like a pallid imitation."

Mallett has alluded to the speculation several times in the strip. In a September 2003 Sunday strip an introverted student tells Frazz that she wants to be famous, and believes it is possible to be famous for one's work, without exposing your private life to the public eye. Frazz says, "Good point. Like J.D. Salinger or Bill Watterson." Though she's never heard of them. As part of a brief story arc in November 2006, Frazz tells Caulfield "I also used to be Bill Watterson's personal assistant." Also, in a story arc where Mallett corrects a mistake in attribution of a quote by Edison, Caulfield compares cartoonists to gods. Frazz replies that that might be a bit of a stretch, but Caulfield replies, "What about that Calvin and Hobbes guy?" and Frazz replies, "Okay, him, yeah."

== Awards ==
- 2003 and 2005 Wilbur Award for Promoting Ethics and Positive Values

== Anthologies ==
- Live at Bryson Elementary. 2005, Andrews McMeel Publishing. 128 pages. Collects strips from April 2, 2001, to January 6, 2002. Includes foreword by Gene Weingarten and introduction by Jef Mallett. ISBN 0-7407-5447-5
- 99% Perspiration. 2006, Andrews McMeel Publishing. 128 pages. Collects strips from January 7, 2002, to October 19, 2002. ISBN 0-7407-6043-2
- Frazz 3.1416. 2008, Andrews McMeel Publishing. 128 pages. Collects strips from October 20, 2002, to July 26, 2003. Includes an introduction by Charles Solomon. ISBN 0-7407-7739-4.
