= Teaching with Calvin and Hobbes =

Rare American children's elementary language textbook

- Author: Linda Holmen, Mary Santella-Johnson, Bill Watterson
- Illustrator: Jan Roebken, Bill Watterson
- Cover artist: Jan Roebken
- Language: English
- Subject: Speech and language pathology
- Genre: Children's textbook
- Publisher: Playground Publishing
- Publication date: 1993
- Publication place: United States
- Media type: Print (Paperback)
- Pages: 200
- ISBN: 1-878849-15-8
- OCLC: 29340469

Teaching with Calvin and Hobbes is an American children's textbook published in 1993. As a rare piece of officially licensed Calvin and Hobbes merchandise, it is a highly valued collectible.

== Content ==
Written by a speech-language pathologist and a learning disabilities educator, Teaching with Calvin and Hobbes is a language textbook for elementary and intermediate-level students. Jan Roebken created the cover and additional interior illustrations.

The book reprints fifty-seven Calvin and Hobbes comic strips, organized into five lesson units. Each unit begins with a series of comic strips that form a story. The five units are:

1. "The Binoculars" – Calvin breaks his father's binoculars and solicits Hobbes' advice.
2. "The Find" – Calvin discovers and assembles a dinosaur skeleton, of sorts. Hobbes renders a drawing of the creature.
3. "The Christmas Story" – As Calvin struggles to be good in anticipation of Santa's arrival, he and Hobbes discuss the philosophy of law and the nature of belief.
4. "The Bug Collection" – Calvin forgets to do his homework, and rushes to complete it on the way to school. Susie gets sent to the principal's office.
5. "The Report" – Calvin and Susie are assigned a joint homework project.

In each unit, questions for comprehension and discussion follow the comic strips:

- Do you think Calvin's mother should have told Calvin the truth about his dinosaur? Why or why not? [...]
- Imagining and creating are important and fun, but, when it goes too far, it's time to get back to reality. Do you think Calvin was disappointed when his mother brought him back to reality or do you think he always had an inkling that he was having fun with his imagination?
- Can you think of a time when you were imagining or creating and your mom or dad brought you back to reality?
- Were you disappointed to get back to reality?

In both the 1996 first edition and the 2006 second edition of their book How to Reach and Teach All Children in the Inclusive Classroom, teachers Sandra F. Rief and Julie A. Heimburge "highly recommend" Teaching with Calvin and Hobbes as an educational resource.

== Rarity ==
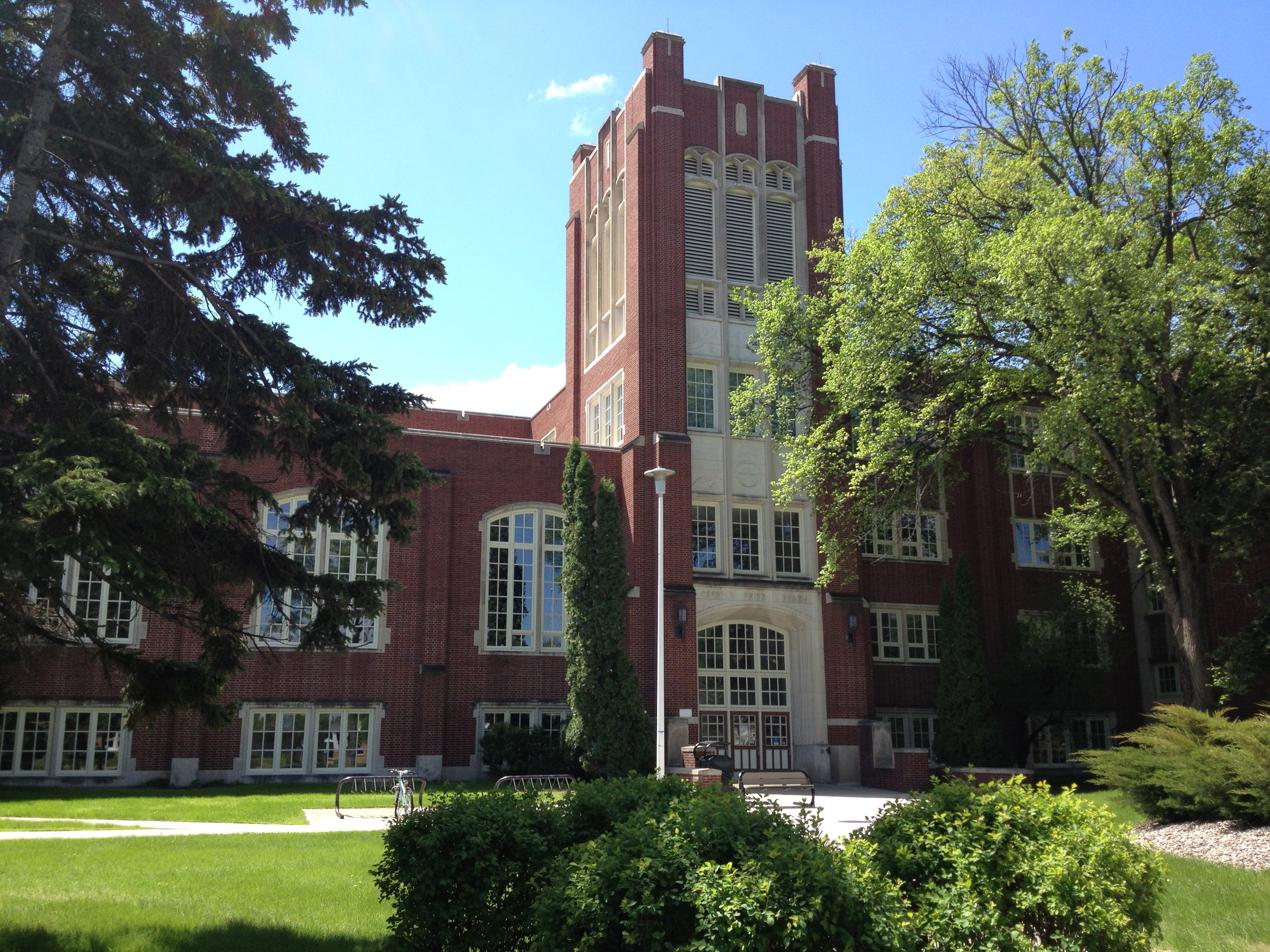
The Chester Fritz Library in North Dakota preserves a copy of Teaching with Calvin and Hobbes.

Owing to Bill Watterson's principled refusal to license his comic strip for merchandise in general, Teaching with Calvin and Hobbes is an exceptional item; a license was granted to the authors after they personally communicated to Watterson the success they had using his comic strip to teach children with learning disabilities.

Published in a limited print run in Fargo, North Dakota, Teaching with Calvin and Hobbes is a rare and sought-after book.

In the 2010 revised edition of his book Looking for Calvin and Hobbes: The Unconventional Story of Bill Watterson and His Revolutionary Comic Strip, Nevin Martell say that the book is "perhaps the most difficult piece of official Calvin and Hobbes memorabilia to find."

The book price comparison website Dualj.com, which tracked sale prices of books, recorded that a copy of Teaching with Calvin and Hobbes sold for US$10,000 in 2009. Valuations for the book ranged up to US$34,000 in 2012. A copy was sold on eBay for an "extremely generous" donation to the HALO Trust charity in 2013.

"It's pretty much the only example of Watterson licensing his characters for anything, and die-hard fans are desperate to get a copy. But those can run up to $34,000 and are nearly impossible to find..."

— The A.V. Club, "The obscure Teaching With Calvin And Hobbes is a collector's Holy Grail," October 27, 2016

As of May 2023, WorldCat lists only eight libraries in the world as holding a copy of the book, including three in North Dakota, where the book was published, the United States Library of Congress, and educational institutions in Ohio, California, the United Arab Emirates, and Singapore. The Chester Fritz Library at the University of North Dakota preserves its copy of Teaching with Calvin and Hobbes in the library's Special Collections Department for rare publications and manuscripts.

== See also ==
- Book collecting
