= Mrs. Wormwood =

Mrs. Wormwood may refer to the following fictional characters:

- A minor character in The Sarah Jane Adventures
- Miss Wormwood, a minor character in comic strip Calvin & Hobbes
- Mrs. Wormwood (Matilda), a minor character in the Roald Dahl novel Matilda
