= Chagrin Falls (waterfall) =

Waterfalls in Ohio, United States

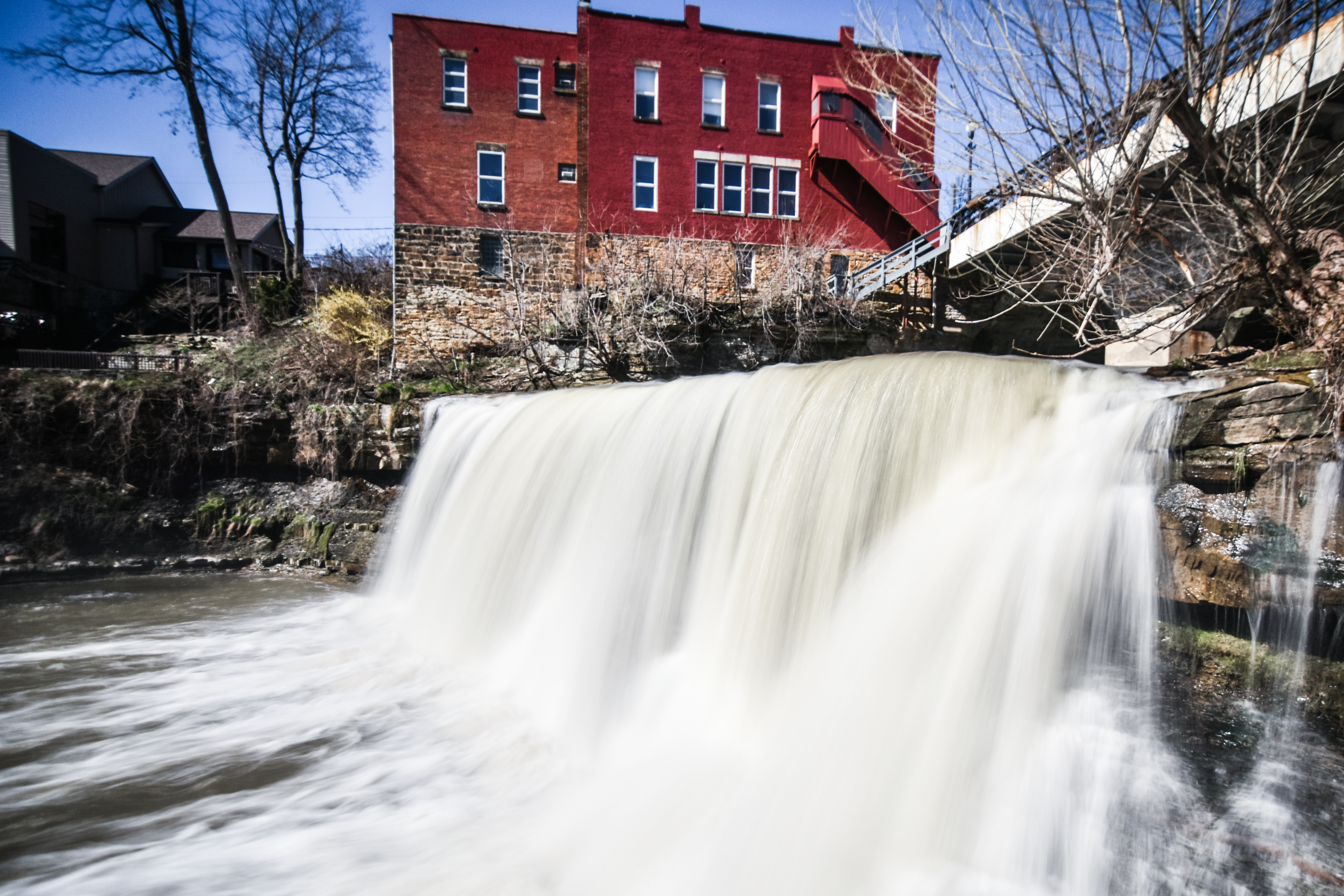
- Interactive map of Chagrin Falls
- Location: Chagrin Falls, Ohio, US
- Coordinates: 41°25′52″N 81°23′32″W
- Total height: 60 feet (18 m)
- Longest drop: 20 feet (6.1 m)

The Chagrin Falls waterfalls are waterfalls spouting off of the Chagrin River in the center of the village of Chagrin Falls, Ohio. At the waterfall base, a viewing area is available. The falls were one of the largest industrial centers in the 1800s and are responsible for the growth of the village around them.

== History ==
The Chagrin Falls originally got their name from a French trader named François Seguin, who traded with Native Americans in the early 1700s. The river later adopted the name "Chagrin". At one point, the Chagrin Falls were the industrial center of Northeast Ohio and powered nine different mills at their peak. The first settlers arrived in 1833 from New England. With the profits they made from their mill work on the falls, they began to build their homes around the river and created the present-day village of Chagrin Falls.

== Geography ==
The Chagrin River flows through the center of Chagrin Falls Village. The falls have a drop of 20 feet (6.1 m) and a crest line of 60 feet (18 m). The water at the bottom of the falls ranges from 2 to 15 feet (0.6 to 4.6 m).

== Notable events ==
=== Blossom Time Festival ===
On Memorial Day weekend every year, the town holds a Blossom Time Festival. The festival features live music, carnival rides, games and a race.

=== New Years Eve ===
Residents gather in the park to watch a giant popcorn ball drop at midnight. The popcorn ball is provided by the local Popcorn Shop.
