= Lazy Sunday =

Lazy Sunday may refer to:

- "Lazy Sunday" (Small Faces song), a song released in 1968
- "Lazy Sunday" (The Lonely Island song), a 2005 SNL digital short

== See also ==
- Calvin and Hobbes, The Calvin and Hobbes Lazy Sunday Book
