= Chagrin Falls, Ohio =

Village in Ohio, United States

- Village
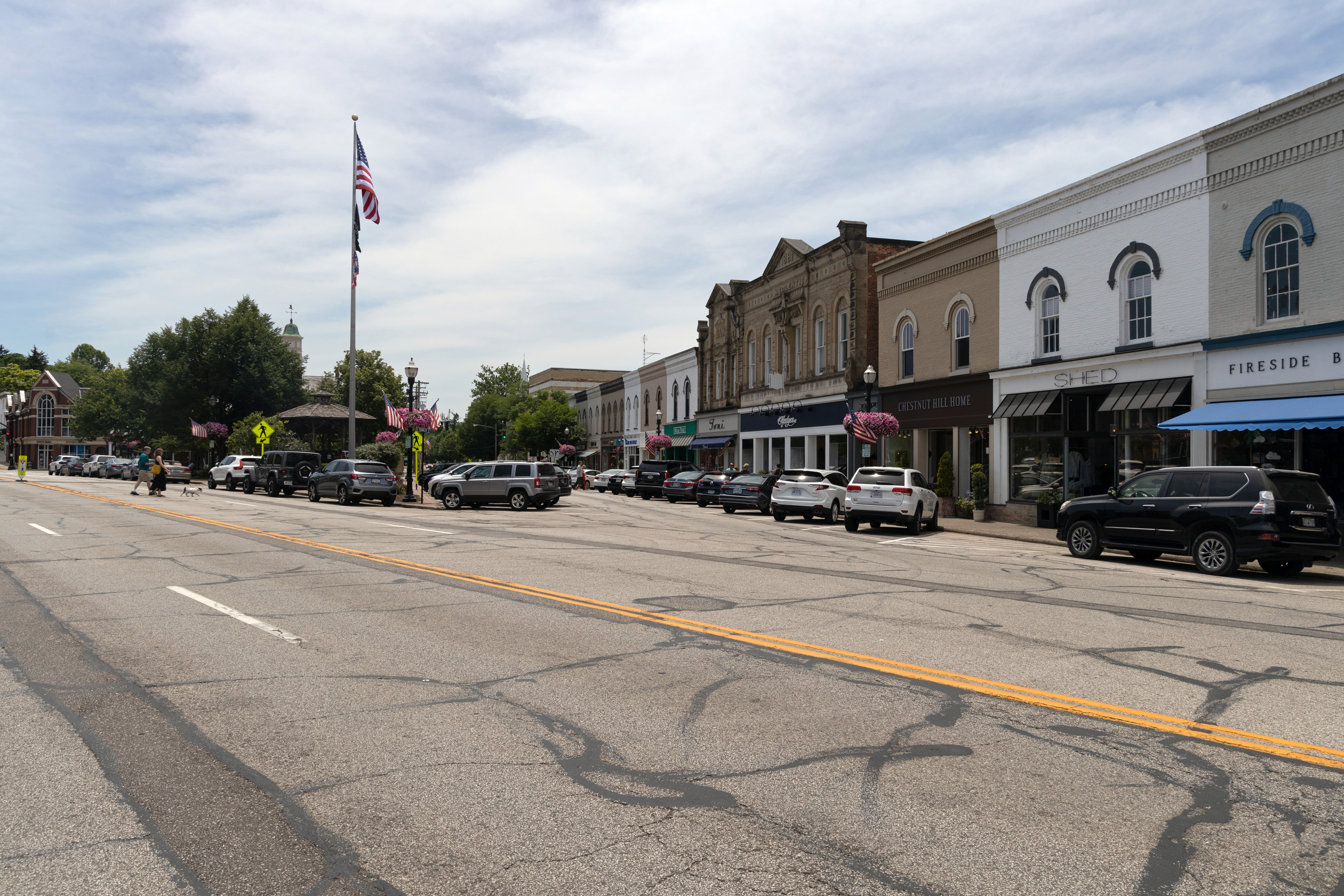
- Chagrin Falls as seen from the Triangle Park area in 2022

- Flag Seal
- Interactive map of Chagrin Falls, Ohio
- Location within Ohio Location within the United States
- Coordinates: 41°25′52″N 81°23′19″W
- Country: United States
- State: Ohio
- County: Cuyahoga

Government
  - Mayor: William Tomko (R)

Area
  - Total: 2.14 sq mi (5.54 km^{2})
  - Land: 2.08 sq mi (5.39 km^{2})
  - Water: 0.058 sq mi (0.15 km^{2})
- Elevation: 1,004 ft (306 m)

Population (2020)
  - Total: 4,188
  - Estimate (2023): 4,087
  - Density: 2,011.5/sq mi (776.66/km^{2})
- Time zone: UTC-5 (Eastern (EST))
  - Summer (DST): UTC-4 (EDT)
- ZIP code: 44022
- Area code: 440
- FIPS code: 39-13358
- GNIS feature ID: 1083437
- Website: https://www.chagrinfallsoh.gov/

Chagrin Falls is a village in eastern Cuyahoga County, Ohio, United States. The population was 4,188 as of the 2020 census. The village was established around the eponymous Chagrin Falls on the Chagrin River. A suburb of Cleveland, it is part of the Cleveland metropolitan area.

== History ==
Chagrin Falls was laid out in 1837. The community takes its name from a series of waterfalls along the Chagrin River, which runs through the town. The village was incorporated in 1844 from parts of three townships in two counties.

== Geography ==
According to the United States Census Bureau, the village has a total area of 2.14 square miles (5.54 km^{2}), of which 2.08 square miles (5.39 km^{2}) is land and 0.06 square miles (0.16 km^{2}) is covered by water. One notable landmark is the Chagrin Falls waterfall.

== Demographics ==
Historical population
Census	Pop.	Note	%±
1870	1,016		—
1880	1,211		19.2%
1890	1,243		2.6%
1900	1,586		27.6%
1910	1,931		21.8%
1920	2,237		15.8%
1930	2,739		22.4%
1940	2,505		−8.5%
1950	3,085		23.2%
1960	3,458		12.1%
1970	4,848		40.2%
1980	4,335		−10.6%
1990	4,146		−4.4%
2000	4,024		−2.9%
2010	4,113		2.2%
2020	4,188		1.8%
2023 (est.)	4,087	▼	−2.4%
U.S. Decennial Census

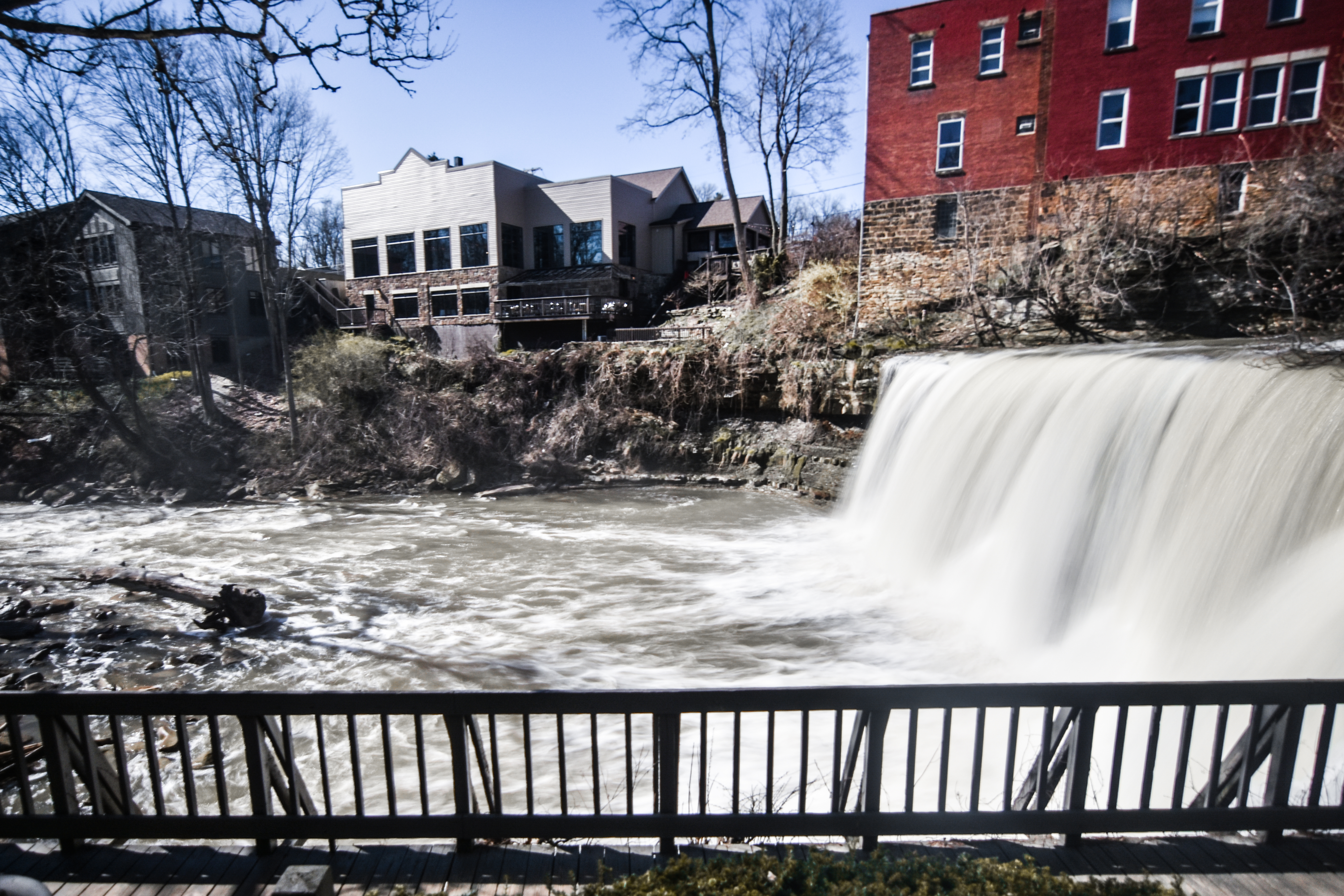
Chagrin Falls waterfall on the Chagrin River near the center of Chagrin Falls

=== Racial and ethnic composition ===
Chagrin Falls village, Ohio – Racial and ethnic composition Note: the US Census treats Hispanic/Latino as an ethnic category. This table excludes Latinos from the racial categories and assigns them to a separate category. Hispanics/Latinos may be of any race.
Race / Ethnicity (NH = Non-Hispanic)	Pop 2000	Pop 2010	Pop 2020	% 2000	% 2010	% 2020
White alone (NH)	3,942	4,001	3,888	97.96%	97.28%	92.84%
Black or African American alone (NH)	2	18	52	0.05%	0.44%	1.24%
Native American or Alaska Native alone (NH)	1	1	5	0.02%	0.02%	0.12%
Asian alone (NH)	18	33	22	0.45%	0.80%	0.53%
Native Hawaiian or Pacific Islander alone (NH)	0	3	0	0.00%	0.07%	0.00%
Other race alone (NH)	3	0	12	0.07%	0.00%	0.29%
Mixed race or Multiracial (NH)	22	21	110	0.55%	0.51%	2.63%
Hispanic or Latino (any race)	36	36	99	0.89%	0.88%	2.36%
Total	4,024	4,113	4,188	100.00%	100.00%	100.00%

=== 2020 census ===
As of the 2020 census, Chagrin Falls had a population of 4,188. The median age was 49.1 years. 20.7% of residents were under the age of 18 and 23.4% were 65 years of age or older. For every 100 females, there were 86.1 males, and for every 100 females age 18 and over, there were 84.0 males.

There were 1,918 households, of which 26.0% had children under the age of 18 living in them. Of all households, 47.0% were married-couple households, 16.7% were households with a male householder and no spouse or partner present, and 32.9% were households with a female householder and no spouse or partner present. About 37.2% of all households were made up of individuals, and 19.9% had someone living alone who was 65 years of age or older.

There were 2,098 housing units, of which 8.6% were vacant. The homeowner vacancy rate was 1.2% and the rental vacancy rate was 11.6%.

100.0% of residents lived in urban areas, while 0.0% lived in rural areas.

=== 2010 census ===
As of the census of 2010, 4,104 people, 1,872 households, and 1,049 families resided in the village. The population density was 1,977.4 inhabitants per square mile (763.5/km^{2}). The 2,042 housing units averaged 981.7 per square mile (379.0/km^{2}). The racial makeup of the village was 98.0% White, 0.4% African American 0.8% Asian, 0.1% Pacific Islander, 0.1% from other races, and 0.5% from two or more races. Hispanics or Latinos of any race were 0.9% of the population.

Of the 1,872 households, 28.2% had children under the age of 18 living with them, 45.2% were married couples living together, 8.0% had a female householder with no husband present, 2.9% had a male householder with no wife present, and 44.0% were not families. About 39.9% of all households were made up of individuals, and 20.8% had someone living alone who was 65 years of age or older. The average household size was 2.16 and the average family size was 2.94.

The median age in the village was 46.1 years; 23.8% of residents were under the age of 18; 4.3% were between 18 and 24; 20.3% were from 25 to 44; 29% were from 45 to 64; and 22.8% were 65 years of age or older. The gender makeup of the village was 46.2% male and 53.8% female.

=== 2000 census ===
As of the census of 2000, 4,024 people, 1,862 households, and 1,100 families resided in the village. The population density was 1,943.2 inhabitants per square mile (750.3/km^{2}). The 2,041 housing units averaged 985.6 per square mile (380.7/km^{2}). In the village, the population was distributed as 22.2% under age 18, 3.5% from 18 to 24, 27.8% from 25 to 44, 26.9% from 45 to 64, and 19.7% who were 65 years of age or older. The median age was 43 years. For every 100 females, there were 84.8 males. For every 100 females age 18 and over, there were 77.6 males.

The median income for a household in the village was $62,917, and for a family was $90,094. Males had a median income of $69,609 versus $36,319 for females. The per capita income for the village was $42,885. About 2.4% of families and 3.6% of the population were below the poverty line, including 6.3% of those under age 18 and none of those age 65 or over.

== Arts and culture ==
- The Chagrin Valley Little Theatre is one of the oldest community theaters in the country, having been in existence since 1930, with the oldest such theater being only eight years older.
- Leader Tractors were produced in Chagrin Falls.
- The Chagrin Valley Recreation Center hosts one of Northeast Ohio's longest-running annual swim meets each summer. The Chagrin Valley Invitation Relays have been held each summer since 1968.
- The town is referenced in the song "Chagrin Falls" by the Canadian rock band The Tragically Hip on their 1998 studio album Phantom Power.
- The non-existent Chagrin Falls Country Club was mentioned by the character Ted Mosby, who claimed to have lifeguarded there, in How I Met Your Mother (S5-E24).
- Chagrin Falls is the hometown of the character Ensign Charles Parker (Tim Conway) in the 1960s sitcom McHale's Navy.
- The 1977 television film The Gathering was filmed in Chagrin Falls.
- Chagrin Falls’ downtown is featured on the back cover of the 1988 Calvin and Hobbes collection The Essential Calvin and Hobbes, written and drawn by Bill Watterson. Watterson is a Chagrin Falls native, which has led to widespread but unconfirmed speculation that Calvin and Hobbes is set there.
- The famed Popeye comic strip called Chagrin Falls home while it was being drawn by the Hungarian-American cartoonist Bela "Bill" Zaboly.
- "Chagrin Falls" is the name of a recurring subseries in the comic Tom the Dancing Bug, probably in honor of Bill Watterson.
- The fictional town of Angel Falls, Ohio, which is featured in the three-book Angel Falls series by Miranda Liasson, is partly modeled after Chagrin Falls.

== Education ==
Chagrin Falls is in the Chagrin Falls Exempted Village School District, which serves the villages of Chagrin Falls, South Russell, and Bentleyville, and a portion of the village of Moreland Hills.

Chagrin Falls High School is the high school.

== Media ==
The weekly newspaper Chagrin Valley Times is produced in the town.

== Notable people ==
- Addie L. Ballou, 19th-century poet, artist, and suffragist
- Lisa Banes, actress
- Ellis Burks, longtime MLB outfielder
- Tim Conway, comedic actor
- Casey Cott, actor, Kevin Keller on The CW's Riverdale
- Corey Cott, Broadway actor
- Bill Cubbedge, Horse trainer
- Dane Davis, businessman, economist, and radio personality
- Martha Derthick, professor and noted scholar of public administration
- Matt DeVries, musician
- Wendy Diamond, author and TV personality
- Mike Durbin, professional bowler; three-time Tournament of Champions winner
- Sonny Geraci, lead singer of The Outsiders and Climax
- Doug Kenney, co-founder of National Lampoon and co-writer of Animal House and Caddyshack
- R.B. Kitaj, painter
- David Kundtz, self-help author and former Catholic priest
- Kathleen Kraninger, director of the Consumer Financial Protection Bureau
- Bryan Malessa, novelist
- Rick Manning, former center fielder of the Cleveland Indians and Milwaukee Brewers
- Dave Matthews, saxophonist
- Charles Morton, US Army brigadier general
- Wendy Murray, journalist
- Elena Shaddow, Broadway actress, singer
- Harry Smith, professional ten-pin bowler and member of the PBA and USBC Halls of Fame
- Will Stanton, humor writer
- Lee Unkrich, Academy Award-winning film director (Toy Story 3)
- Andre Thornton, MLB Baseball Player, hit 214 homeruns in his 10 seasons with the Cleveland Indians.
- Fred van Lente, comic book writer (Action Philosophers!, The Incredible Hercules)
- Bill Watterson, creator of Calvin and Hobbes
- Mike Wise, American politician from 1992 - 1996
- Ted Wood, former outfielder for San Francisco Giants
- Bela "Bill" Zaboly, American cartoonist of the Popeye comic strip from 1938 to 1959
