= Dave Matthews (saxophonist) =

American jazz musician

- Born: June 6, 1911; Chagrin Falls, Ohio, U.S.
- Origin: McAlester, Oklahoma, U.S.
- Died: 1997 (aged 85–86)
- Genres: Jazz, swing
- Instruments: Alto saxophone, tenor saxophone

Dave Matthews (June 6, 1911 – 1997) was an American jazz saxophonist active principally in the swing era.

== Early life and education ==
Matthews was born in Chagrin Falls, Ohio, and raised in McAlester, Oklahoma. He attended the University of Oklahoma and Chicago Musical College.

== Career ==
Matthews started out as an alto saxophonist with Ben Pollack in 1935, with Jimmy Dorsey from 1936 to 1937, with Benny Goodman from 1937 to 1939, Harry James from 1939 to 1941, and Hal McIntyre from 1941 to 1942. He then played tenor saxophone with Woody Herman (1942/43), Stan Kenton and Charlie Barnet (1944). He arranged for many of these groups, and continued working as an arranger in New York and California into the 1960s, with Duke Ellington among others. Occasionally he played with his own bands, including at Lake Tahoe in the 1970s.

He made recordings with the big bands of Bud Freeman, Lionel Hampton, Jimmy Noone, Jack Teagarden, and Hot Lips Page.
