= List of Calvin and Hobbes books =

Prior to the release of The Complete Calvin and Hobbes in 2005, eighteen Calvin and Hobbes books were published in the United States between 1987 and 2001.

Bill Watterson wrote a total of nineteen (Note: Counting the hardcover and paperback editions of The Complete Calvin and Hobbes as one title (despite being released seven years apart and consisting of a different number of volumes).) official Calvin and Hobbes books that have been published in the United States by Andrews McMeel Publishing; the first, eponymously titled Calvin and Hobbes, was released April 1987, and the most recent, Exploring Calvin and Hobbes: An Exhibition Catalogue, was released February 2015.

A twentieth official title, the textbook Teaching with Calvin and Hobbes, was published under license in 1993 by Playground Publishing in Fargo, North Dakota.

Before the 2005 release of The Complete Calvin and Hobbes, all the extant newspaper strips were collected across eight distinct titles:

- The Essential Calvin and Hobbes, 1988
- The Authoritative Calvin and Hobbes, 1990
- The Indispensable Calvin and Hobbes, 1992
- Attack of the Deranged Mutant Killer Monster Snow Goons, 1992
- The Days Are Just Packed, 1993
- Homicidal Psycho Jungle Cat, 1994
- There's Treasure Everywhere, 1996
- It's a Magical World, 1996

Title	Date	ISBN	Format	Strips	Original content
Calvin and Hobbes	April 1987	ISBN 0-8362-2088-9	black and white	November 18, 1985 (first strip) to August 17, 1986	Foreword by Garry Trudeau; original black-and-white artwork scattered throughout book
Something Under the Bed Is Drooling	April 1988	ISBN 0-8362-1825-6	black and white	August 18, 1986 to May 23, 1987	Foreword by Pat Oliphant; original black-and-white artwork scattered throughout book
The Essential Calvin and Hobbes: A Calvin and Hobbes Treasury	September 1988	ISBN 0-8362-1805-1	color Sundays/Black and White	All strips from Calvin and Hobbes and Something Under the Bed Is Drooling	Foreword by Charles M. Schulz; an illustrated poem, "A Nauseous Nocturne"
Yukon Ho!	March 1989	ISBN 0-8362-1835-3	black and white	May 24, 1987 to February 21, 1988	The "Yukon Song"; original black-and-white artwork scattered throughout book
The Calvin and Hobbes Lazy Sunday Book: A Collection of Sunday Calvin and Hobbes Cartoons	September 1989	ISBN 0-8362-1852-3	All color Sundays	May 24, 1987 to July 30, 1989 (Sunday strips only)	Ten-page story "Spaceman Spiff: Interplanetary Explorer Extraordinaire!"; afterword by Bill Watterson; and a specially redrawn version of the August 28, 1988 strip
Weirdos from Another Planet!	March 1990	ISBN 0-8362-1862-0	black and white	February 22, 1988 to December 4, 1988 (some strips from November are also found in The Revenge of the Baby-Sat)	Original black-and-white artwork scattered throughout book
The Authoritative Calvin and Hobbes: A Calvin and Hobbes Treasury	October 1990	ISBN 0-8362-1822-1	color Sundays/Black and white	All strips from Yukon Ho! and Weirdos from Another Planet!	Seven-page story in which Calvin becomes an elephant
The Revenge of the Baby-Sat	April 1991	ISBN 0-8362-1866-3	black and white	December 5, 1988 to September 10, 1989	
Scientific Progress Goes "Boink"	October 1991	ISBN 0-8362-1878-7	black and white	September 11, 1989 to July 15, 1990 (some strips from June and July are also found in Attack of the Deranged Mutant Killer Monster Snow Goons)	
Attack of the Deranged Mutant Killer Monster Snow Goons	April 1992	ISBN 0-8362-1883-3	black and white	June 11, 1990 to April 10, 1991	
The Indispensable Calvin and Hobbes: A Calvin and Hobbes Treasury	October 1992	ISBN 0-8362-1898-1	color Sundays / black and white	All strips from The Revenge of the Baby-Sat and Scientific Progress Goes "Boink"	Several illustrated poems
Teaching with Calvin and Hobbes	1993	ISBN 1-8788-4915-8	black and white	57 strips comprising five stories: "The Binoculars," "The Find," "The Christmas Story," "The Bug Collection," and "The Report"	Lesson units by Linda Holmen and Mary Santella-Johnson based on the strips
The Days Are Just Packed	October 1993	ISBN 0-8362-1735-7	color Sundays	April 11, 1991 to November 1, 1992, excluding May 5, 1991 to Feb 1, 1992 due to repeats	
Homicidal Psycho Jungle Cat	October 1994	ISBN 0-8362-1769-1	color Sundays/ black and white	November 2, 1992 to August 29, 1993	
The Calvin and Hobbes Tenth Anniversary Book	October 1995	ISBN 0-8362-0438-7	color Sundays	Collection of strips chosen by the author	Commentary by Watterson and annotations on individual strips
There's Treasure Everywhere	March 1996	ISBN 0-8362-1312-2	color Sundays	August 30, 1993 to April 8, 1995, excluding April 3 to December 31, 1994, due to repeats (some strips from March and April 1995 are also found in It's a Magical World)	
It's a Magical World	October 1996	ISBN 0-8362-2136-2	color Sundays	March 20, 1995 to December 31, 1995 (final strip) (some strips from March and April are also found in There's Treasure Everywhere)	
Calvin and Hobbes: Sunday Pages, 1985-1995: An Exhibition Catalogue	September 2001	ISBN 0-7407-2135-6	color Sundays	Collection of Sunday strips chosen by the author	Original sketches and commentary by Watterson
The Complete Calvin and Hobbes (hardcover)	October 2005	ISBN 0-7407-4847-5	color Sundays / black and white	Three-volume set containing all strips; 22.5 lb./10.2 kg; includes Spiff feature, the illustrated poems, and color prints of other cover art	Introduction and commentary
The Complete Calvin and Hobbes (paperback)	November 2012	ISBN 1-4494-3325-1	color Sundays / black and white	Four-volume set containing all strips; 14.3 lb./6.5 kg; includes Spiff feature, the illustrated poems, and color prints of other cover art	Introduction and commentary
Exploring Calvin and Hobbes: An Exhibition Catalogue	February 2015	ISBN 978-1-4494-6036-5		Catalogue for the exhibit by the same name at the Billy Ireland Cartoon Library & Museum at Ohio State University	Original art and commentary by Watterson
