= Chagrin Valley Times =

Newspaper in Ohio, United States

- Chagrin Valley Times logo.
- Type: Weekly newspaper
- Publisher: H. Kenneth Douthit
- Founded: 1971
- Headquarters: 525 E. Washington St. Chagrin Falls, Ohio 44022
- Website: chagrinvalleytoday.com

The Chagrin Valley Times is a Northeast Ohio weekly newspaper covering the eastern suburbs of Cleveland in Cuyahoga and Geauga counties. The newspaper is published every Thursday and was founded in 1971. It is produced in the village of Chagrin Falls, Ohio.

== Politics ==
On August 16, 2018, the Chagrin Valley Times was part of a campaign launched by the Boston Globe in which 350 newspapers addressed the repeated attacks on American news media by Donald Trump. CNN Money named the Chagrin Valley Times as one of the "16 must-read editorials" of the campaign.

== Legal ==
In 2013, Murray Energy Company sued The Chagrin Valley Times for defamation of Robert Murray after the paper ran an article covering a protest at the company's Pepper Pike offices. The protest took place as a result of Murray firing 158 employees the day after President Barack Obama was re-elected in the 2012 Election. In addition to negative coverage of Murray, Ron Hill, cartoonist for the Chagrin Valley Times, published a cartoon of a snowman made out of lumps of coal, holding a sack of money in each of his hands. Hill included lyrics to "Frosty the Snowman", with a parody on the words that read "Murray the coal-man meant to hoard away his pay."

The lower court ruled that Robert Murray was a public figure and that the newspaper had not demonstrated the standard for defamation of a public figure. In 2019, an appeal was filed with the Ohio Supreme Court, which voted 4-3, allowing the lower court ruling to stand.
