= Leader Tractor Company =

Tractor manufacturers of the United States

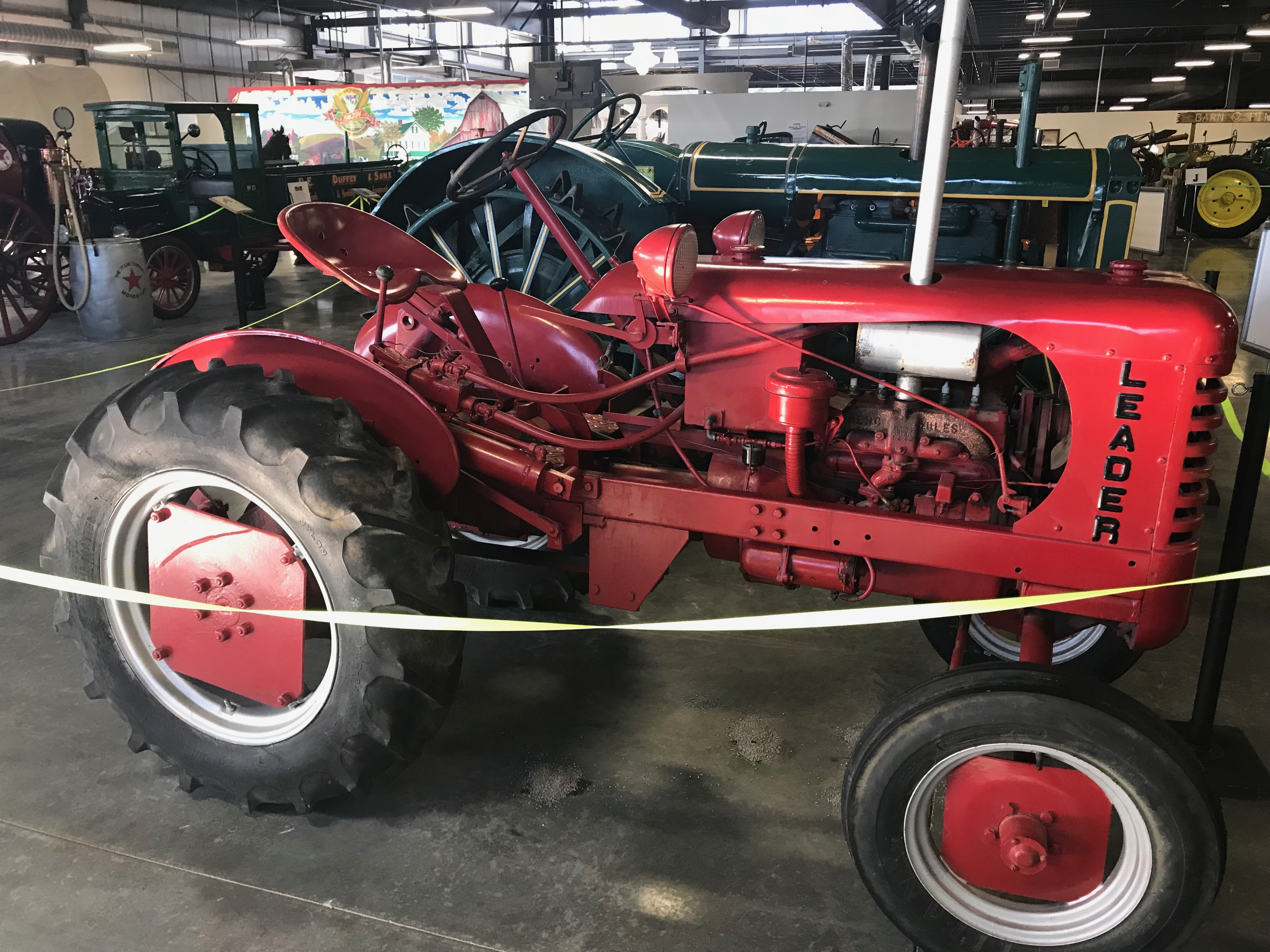
1949 Leader Tractor, manufactured in Chagrin Falls, OH. This one is located at the Branson, Mo Auto and Tractor Museum

The Leader Tractor Company was a small tractor manufacturer operating first out of Auburn then Chagrin Falls, Ohio in the early 1940s.

The company was founded by a father and son team, Lewis and Walter Brockway in Auburn, Ohio. They first sold small garden tractors locally as the American Garden Tractor Company, of which there were about 20 tractors produced. Then they changed the name to Leader Tractor Company and began producing a larger version with a Chevrolet four Cylinder engine, of which about 500 were made. By 1945 the Chevrolet engines supply diminished and they began using Hercules Engine Company flat-head engines. The factory was eventually moved to Chagrin Falls, a short distance from Auburn, ostensibly because Auburn lacked a post office.

The tractors were in relatively high demand, and were being marketed by The Schotts Brothers, who owned several car dealerships in Ohio. They provided a loan to the Brockways to increase production. However, when the Schotts called in the loan, which had a pay-on-demand clause, the Brockways were unable to pay and were forced to sell the company to the Schotts in 1949. The Schotts ceased production at the factory and liquidated the remaining inventory.
