= List of Calvin and Hobbes characters =

This is a list of characters from Calvin and Hobbes, a comic strip by Bill Watterson. The strip revolves around a mischievous six-year-old boy named Calvin and his stuffed tiger, Hobbes. Other characters include Calvin's parents, classmates, and numerous imaginary creatures.

== Calvin ==
Calvin
- The main character, Calvin

Publication information
- Publisher: Andrews McMeel Publishing
- First appearance: November 18, 1985
- Created by: Bill Watterson

Calvin, named after the 16th-century theologian John Calvin, is a six-year-old boy with spiky blond hair and a distinctive red-and-black striped shirt, black pants and sneakers. Despite his poor grades in school, Calvin demonstrates his intelligence through a sophisticated vocabulary, philosophical mind and creative/artistic talent. Watterson described Calvin as having "not much of a filter between his brain and his mouth", a "little too intelligent for his age", lacking in restraint and not yet having the experience to "know the things that you shouldn't do." The comic strip largely revolves around Calvin's imaginative inner world and his largely antagonistic experiences with those outside of it (fellow students, authority figures and his parents). Watterson said that Calvin was not based on his own childhood, stating that he (Watterson) was "a quiet obedient kid (...) almost Calvin's opposite". Many authors have linked Calvin's erratic behavior to ADHD.

== Hobbes ==
Hobbes
- Calvin's stuffed tiger, Hobbes, as Calvin sees him

Publication information
- Publisher: Andrews McMeel Publishing
- First appearance: November 18, 1985
- Created by: Bill Watterson

From Calvin's point of view, Hobbes is an anthropomorphic tiger much larger than Calvin and full of independent attitudes and ideas. When a scene includes any other human, Hobbes appears as a stuffed animal, usually seated at an off-kilter angle with a blank facial expression. The true nature of the character is never resolved, instead as Watterson describes, a 'grown-up' version of reality is juxtaposed against Calvin's, with the reader left to "decide which is truer". Watterson stated that unlike most imaginary friends that children have, Hobbes has the ability to argue with Calvin, which means that "Hobbes is more real than [he suspects] any kid would dream up." Hobbes is based on a cat Watterson owned, a grey tabby named Sprite. Sprite inspired the length of Hobbes's body as well as his personality. Although Hobbes's humor stems from acting like a human, Watterson maintained Sprite's feline attitude.

Hobbes is named after 17th-century philosopher Thomas Hobbes, who held what Watterson describes as "a dim view of human nature." He typically exhibits a greater understanding of consequences than Calvin, but rarely intervenes in Calvin's activities beyond a few oblique warnings. He often likes to sneak up and pounce on Calvin, especially at the front door when Calvin is returning home from school. The friendship between the two characters provides the core dynamic of the strip.

== Calvin's family ==
=== Mom and Dad ===
Calvin's parents
- Calvin's unnamed parents, usually referred to only as "Mom" and "Dad"

Publication information
- Publisher: Andrews McMeel Publishing
- First appearance: November 18, 1985 (Dad); November 26, 1985 (Mom)
- Created by: Bill Watterson

Watterson has never given Calvin's parents' names "because as far as the strip is concerned, they are important only as Calvin's mom and dad." Like Hobbes, they serve as counterpoints to Calvin's attitude and view of the world. However, Watterson sometimes uses them to explore situations adults can relate to, such as the desire to enjoy leisure time as opposed to the need to work, or bad customer service and frustrations when grocery shopping. Also, occasionally Watterson takes the time to flesh out the two parental characters. One example is a storyline in which the family returns from a wedding to find their house has been broken into and ransacked. For several strips, Calvin and Hobbes fade into the background as Mom and Dad reflect on the impact of the event. Calvin's father is particularly shaken, admitting to his wife that when he was growing up, he looked up to his own father as an adult able to automatically handle any situation that comes his way, then says, "I don't think I'd have been in such a hurry to reach adulthood if I'd known the whole thing was going to be ad-libbed."

Calvin's father is a white-collar office worker, specifically a patent attorney, as Watterson's own father was. Watterson has said that much of Calvin's dad's personality is based off his own father as well. An outdoorsman, he enjoys bike rides and camping trips, sometimes in extreme weather, and insists that these activities, like Calvin's chores, "build character". Though his age is never specified, when Calvin offers him a bowl of chocolate cereal, he replies "No thanks, I'm trying to reach middle age." He often responds to Calvin's questions with deliberate lies as a private joke; for example, when Calvin asks how people make babies, his dad responds that "most people just go to Sears, buy the kit, and follow the assembly instructions," but that Calvin was "a blue light special at K Mart. Almost as good, and a lot cheaper." Calvin mostly believes his dad's answers, though on one occasion, when he tells Calvin that wind is "trees sneezing", when Calvin asks if that's really true, his dad replies, "No, but the truth is far more complicated." Calvin sometimes treats his dad's role in his life as a political office and will give his dad reports on his "polls" regarding his performance, often suggesting that his dad is in danger of being voted out in response to things Calvin doesn't like, such as being told to do homework or take baths. Watterson has said that Calvin's "polling" of his father is a commentary by him about his own personal dislike of political polls and how absurd he feels they are. Calvin's dad also has an unfavorable view of most television content and sensationalist news shows. Based on photographs of Watterson, Calvin's dad resembles him, sans a moustache, and Watterson has commented that he relates to Calvin's dad the most.

Calvin's mother is a stay-at-home mom who is frequently exasperated by Calvin's antics, with Watterson adding that her job "taxes her sanity." Before Calvin's birth, she worked a stressful job filled with aggravation, which Calvin's father claims is the reason she was better prepared to stay at home and raise Calvin. Whether or not he was jesting is debatable. On the rare occasions when she is not reacting to Calvin's misbehavior, she seems to enjoy quiet activities, such as gardening and reading. She is frequently the one forced to curb Calvin's destructive tendencies; in one Sunday strip, she allows Calvin to smoke a cigarette in order to teach him how unpleasant smoking can be. Watterson has said he regrets the fact that the strip mostly shows her impatient side. In another strip, she voices a wish that Calvin will one day have a child like himself, so he can understand what he puts her through, and Calvin retorts that her own mother used to say the same thing about her. She also usually seems sympathetic towards her son's relationship with Hobbes, and a few times has found herself speaking to Hobbes as well, though this embarrasses her.

Early on in the strip, Watterson says, the parent characters were criticized by readers for being overly sarcastic and insufficiently patient, especially Calvin's father, who has several times reminded his wife that he at first wanted a dog instead of a son. Watterson has defended their parenting methods, saying that "when it comes to parenting a kid like Calvin, I think they do a better job than I would."

=== Other relatives ===
==== Uncle Max ====
Calvin's Uncle Max appeared in a series of strips in 1988, visiting the family. Uncle Max is the older brother of Calvin's father, though he is established as single and childfree. When Calvin (who first suspected Max was a con man trying to swindle them) guesses that Max had been in jail (to explain why he hasn't met Max), his mother is outraged, while his father seems to agree with Calvin, saying "with Max, that's not a bad guess". Max even relates to Calvin a bit more by acknowledging Hobbes, commenting that he has "a killer's eye", which leads Calvin to comment that Max is "sharp" and "hard to believe he's related to Dad."

Watterson has said Uncle Max was meant to be included in further strips, such as where the family would go to Max's home to pay him a visit; he never appeared again because Watterson felt that it was strange for Max to be unable to refer to the parents with proper names, and that the character never provided the new material for Calvin that he had hoped for.

Max is drawn to resemble Calvin's dad, but with a moustache instead of glasses. The two are modeled after Watterson, who wore both.

==== Grandparents ====
A few strips mention Calvin's grandparents. One example, which Watterson selected for reproduction in the Tenth Anniversary Book, features Calvin telling Hobbes describing his Grandfather's complaints about comic strips: newspapers print them too small, and now they look like Xeroxed talking heads. Hobbes then tells Calvin that his grandfather takes comic strips seriously; Calvin says as a result, his mother is looking into nursing homes.

== Susie Derkins ==
Susie Derkins

Publication information
- Publisher: Andrews McMeel Publishing
- First appearance: December 5, 1985
- Created by: Bill Watterson

Susie Derkins is a classmate of Calvin who lives in his neighborhood. She is the only recurring character in the comic strip to have both a forename and a surname (other characters are mentioned briefly). Named after Watterson's in-laws' family beagle, she first appeared early in the strip as a new student in Calvin's class, but in later strips speaks as a longtime neighbor. In contrast to Calvin, she is polite and diligent in her studies, and her imagination usually seems mild-mannered and civilized, consisting of games such as playing "house" or having tea parties with her stuffed animals. In one strip it's shown that Susie plays lacrosse, when she uses her stick to fling back a pinecone that Calvin tried to hit her with. Her parents are referred to several times in the strip, but have not appeared other than one brief shot of her mother's legs while talking to Calvin.

Susie is frequently the victim of Calvin's derision and plots, and is also often willing to retaliate when provoked. Most commonly, Susie will be the target of Calvin's water balloons or snowballs. Calvin often goes to great lengths to disgust or annoy Susie, as when founding his and Hobbes' club 'G.R.O.S.S.' (Get Rid Of Slimy GirlS) expressly to exclude her. Susie is Calvin's equal (and often superior) in cunning, often turning his plans into ignominious defeats. The two sometimes speak at their bus stop, where both usually become exasperated at each other; and at the lunch table at school, where Calvin deliberately grosses Susie out with fictitious descriptions of his lunch. Susie sometimes argues in academia's favor when Calvin says disparaging things about school, and on at least two occasions worries that Calvin's antics will affect her own academic progress.

Watterson has said he suspects that Calvin and Susie may have a crush on each other, and that "this encourages Calvin to annoy her". This love/hate relationship is most obvious in a Valentine's Day strip in which Susie hits Calvin with snowball for sending her "a hate mail valentine and a bunch of dead flowers", but both inwardly show appreciation; Susie because Calvin sent her a gift, and Calvin because Susie had noticed. In another strip, Calvin calls Susie for help with homework, and she teases him that he missed "the melodious sound of [her] voice". During one series of strips Calvin modifies his "duplicator" to copy only his good side; this well-dressed, polite, and studious version of Calvin soon becomes besotted with Susie, but is rebuffed with a hostile reaction.

Despite the general animosity, there are occasions where Susie and Calvin can get along somewhat peaceably, such as when Calvin had been the only boy not to sign up for baseball at recess. Calvin reacts with concern for cooties at first, but gets over this and plays with Susie on the teeter-totter expressing his concerns that it is pointless to do something just because it is mainstream, while also admitting his dislike for organized sports because of all the rules and being ordered around. Susie seems to take his concerns as valid points.

Susie features as a main character in two of the five storylines that appear in Teaching with Calvin and Hobbes.

=== Mr. Bun ===
Mr. Bun is Susie's stuffed rabbit, which frequents her tea parties as a guest. Unlike Hobbes, Mr. Bun is never shown as a living character, and Hobbes once described Mr. Bun as "comatose". This is used for comedic effect occasionally, as when Susie, playing "House" with Calvin, attempts to use Mr. Bun as their baby child, only to have Calvin refuse to recognize him as a human infant—with the entire strip, including the rabbit, drawn in a realistic style à la Rex Morgan, M.D..

== Miss Wormwood ==
Miss Wormwood

Publication information
- Publisher: Andrews McMeel Publishing
- First appearance: November 21, 1985
- Created by: Bill Watterson

Miss Wormwood is Calvin's schoolteacher. Watterson commented that a few astute fans of the strip have correctly asked him if Miss Wormwood was named after the apprentice demon in C. S. Lewis' The Screwtape Letters. She usually wears polka-dotted dresses, and serves as a foil to Calvin's mischief. Despite the changing seasons and recurring holidays, the characters in Calvin and Hobbes do not age, and so Calvin and Susie return to Miss Wormwood's first-grade class every fall.

Miss Wormwood is rarely sympathetic to the trouble Calvin has in school, and comes across as a rather strict and sour character. She often calls on Calvin to answer questions, to catch him off guard, to which Calvin either replies with an excuse ("Hard to say, Ma'am. I think my cerebellum just fused."), or takes solace in the world of Spaceman Spiff or another alter ego. She is quick to send Calvin to the principal's office at the first sign of trouble. Calvin apparently takes joy in being the reason why Miss Wormwood mixes different stress-related medications (she "drinks Maalox straight from the bottle") and heavily smokes cigarettes ("Rumor has it she's up to two packs a day, unfiltered.") Calvin's antics leave Miss Wormwood anxious for retirement (one strip has her chanting in her head, "Five years until retirement, five years until retirement, five years until retirement..."). Regarding the difficulties of reining in rambunctious students, she once commented that "it's not enough that we have to be disciplinarians. Now we need to be psychologists." However, she does praise Calvin whenever he does apply himself or get an answer right, as her main concern is education and not putting Calvin down (though Calvin believes otherwise).

== Moe ==
Moe

Publication information
- Publisher: Andrews McMeel Publishing
- First appearance: January 30, 1986
- Created by: Bill Watterson

Moe is a bully in Calvin's school. His frequently monosyllabic dialogue is shown in crude, lower-case letters. Watterson describes Moe as "every jerk I've ever known". Moe is the only minor character in the strip who hurts Calvin without being provoked and is also the only significant character never portrayed sympathetically. While most of Moe's appearances involve him either beating Calvin up or extorting money from him, Calvin does occasionally outsmart Moe, such as in one early strip, when Moe tells Calvin he's in Moe's favorite swing, Calvin just replies, "That's true, Moe. How about that?", leaving Moe indecisive on how to reply. On another strip series, Calvin brings Hobbes to school and urges Moe to play with him (believing Hobbes will attack Moe), only for Moe to flee, believing Calvin was setting him up to be caught stealing.

Stephan Pastis of the 2000s comic Pearls Before Swine has cited Watterson and Calvin and Hobbes as among his many influences; in particular, the Zeeba Zeeba Eata fraternity of crocodiles is identified with Moe, even speaking in the same typeface.

== Rosalyn ==
Rosalyn

Publication information
- Publisher: Andrews McMeel Publishing
- First appearance: May 15, 1986
- Created by: Bill Watterson

Rosalyn, the last of the significant recurring characters to appear, is a high school senior and the only babysitter able to tolerate Calvin's antics. Rosalyn is perhaps the only character in the strip whom Calvin really fears (other than Moe, the school bully). Introduced in an early strip, meant to only be a one-time character, Watterson found her ferocity and intimidation of Calvin surprising, and he brought her back periodically in increasingly elaborate story-lines. She was also seen as a swim instructor when Calvin was conscripted into swimming lessons, which Watterson had done to have at least one story arc with Rosalyn that did not have to do with babysitting. Watterson described their relationship as "one-dimensional", although in her final appearance Rosalyn agrees to play a game of Calvinball, and in so doing, becoming the only character in the strip, other than Hobbes, to truly engage with Calvin on his own terms. Despite the limited storylines with Rosalyn, Watterson has said that for a late addition to the strip, "she's worked very well."

Calvin is often terrified of her, calling her a "sadistic kid-hater" and a "barracuda in a high-school-senior suit"; but in the final Rosalyn story, their opposition is averted by a game of Calvinball, which Rosalyn wins. In nearly all the "Rosalyn stories", Rosalyn is shown demanding advance payment and raises in wage from Calvin's parents, supposedly to pay for college or for the hard work necessary to control Calvin. When Calvin throws a tantrum at the swim school, Rosalyn says to herself "What I put up with to pay for college". In at least four stories, Rosalyn telephones her boyfriend, Charlie, to cancel prearranged meetings which she cannot fulfill. (Charlie remains an unseen character, although Calvin yells at a barber named Charlie, not known if it is the same one.) Calvin sometimes urges Charlie to stop courting Rosalyn, on grounds that Rosalyn is sadistic and/or insane. The collection Revenge of the Baby-Sat took its name from a storyline in which Calvin steals her study notes and threatens to flush them down the toilet bowl.

Rosalyn's demands for higher pay to baby-sit Calvin have often been met with a small discussion, usually with Calvin's father protesting Rosalyn's pay demands, to which Calvin's mother quietly tells him, "Just pay what it takes to get us out of here." In the last cell of the Revenge of the Baby-Sat storyline, after Rosalyn apparently demands so much money for what she went through that she empties Calvin's father's wallet, he asks, "Are you sure there's nobody else in this town willing to babysit Calvin?" To which Calvin's mother says, "Maybe you would like to spend a week on the phone?" Rosalyn is also occasionally mentioned as one of the many babysitters Calvin's parents have hired, the only one whose name recurs twice is Amy, who has apparently "purged [Calvin] from her memory".

== Other characters ==
The cast of principal, recurring characters in Calvin and Hobbes is limited; for example, in the Yukon Ho! collection, only five regular characters appear. Other characters who make infrequent or one-off appearances include the following.

- Living food: Calvin often imagines that an oatmeal-like food comes to life, sometimes attacking him (or, in one case, reciting Hamlet's "To be, or not to be" soliloquy). Bill Watterson has said that his inspiration for this came from a cartoon drawn by himself in childhood, which featured living oatmeal, plus his own admitted "fussy eating habits" from when he was a child.
- Extraterrestrial life forms: Calvin encounters many extraterrestrial life-forms in the course of the strip, usually during adventures as his alter-ego, Spaceman Spiff. Most of these aliens are non-humanoid, bizarre monsters, but represent Calvin's imaginative perception of Susie, his parents, and teachers. During the story which gave the name to the Weirdos from Another Planet! collection, Calvin and Hobbes encounter a native Martian, who is a small creature with tentacles and eye-stalks. In the strip's final year, Watterson drew two stories involving recurring alien characters, Galaxoid and Nebular, to whom Calvin "sold" the Earth for 50 alien leaves to use for his science project, which he failed when his teacher rejected the leaves' origin. The donors returned in the final two weeks of strips, angry at Calvin for failing to reveal the changing seasons. When Hobbes suggests to Calvin that he returns the 50 leaves to them, Calvin angrily admits he threw them away because he got such a bad grade; both were placated when Hobbes clad them in Christmas stockings.
- Doctor: Calvin occasionally visits his pediatrician, who appears to be a mild-mannered physician with a friendly demeanor. Calvin, however, sees him as a vicious, sadistic interrogator, sometimes imagining him as an alien or overreacting to playful diagnoses. The doctor made his final appearance when he diagnosed Calvin with chicken pox.
- Barber: Calvin once goes to a barber named Pete, and barbers are mentioned throughout the series, including one named Charlie.
- Principal Spittle: Calvin's school principal usually makes his appearance when Calvin has upset Miss Wormwood; typically, he is seen looking over his desk as Calvin tries to explain his latest mishap, with an apathetic or infuriated expression in his face. He is seldom shown speaking except in his first appearance. He is depicted thinking to himself that he hates his job.
- Mr. Lockjaw: Mr. Lockjaw is the gym teacher and coach of the baseball team at Calvin's school. He is a squat, burly man with little patience, and no sympathy for Calvin whenever Moe gets violent with him in gym class, with Calvin commenting that Lockjaw thinks "violence is aerobic." He does not stop Calvin's baseball teammates from abusing and teasing him, and when Calvin leaves the team, Lockjaw calls him a "quitter". This emotional trauma leads Calvin to create Calvinball, supposedly the least organized sport.
- Scouts: Early in the strip, Watterson shows Calvin participating with other children in Cub Scout activities in the woods. Watterson thought at the time that Scouting might offer some potential for interesting adventures, but eventually abandoned the idea, considering it uncharacteristic of Calvin to join an organization.
- Susie's mom: She is shown from the waist down in a foiled attempt to pester Susie, and is also seen having a brief dialogue during Susie's first experience with Calvin's alter-ego, Stupendous Man.
- Substitute teachers: Occasionally, Calvin's class will have a substitute teacher. Only one, Mr. Kneecapper, was named; Calvin tricked Susie into believing that Mr. Kneecapper cooked rowdy students into the cafeteria meatloaf. In one set of strips, an unnamed woman is substituting; she looks through some notes Miss Wormwood left and inquires which child Calvin is. Later, Hobbes asks Calvin what he thought of her, Calvin replies he is unsure as "she went home at noon."
- The monsters under the bed: the primary villains of the comic strip, along with Moe: a diverse set of bizarre-looking photophobic creatures, who live under Calvin's bed and periodically plan to eat Calvin, but are outwitted by him on each occasion. Only two of the monsters have names; one is Maurice, and another Winslow. Another monster from the comic-poem A Nauseous Nocturne comes to eat Calvin, only to be deterred by Hobbes. This shows that the monsters are more than a little afraid of Calvin's best buddy, a reference to the fact that sleeping with a stuffed animal can relief stress and reduce nightmares.
- Calvin's bicycle: A supporting villain, it will frequently chase (and even sometimes run over) Calvin, destroying household items or injuring Calvin himself.
- Other students: Calvin's classmates, like his teacher, are assumed to be the same every year as no time appears to pass in the comic strip. Some of the students who do have names are - Tommy Chestnutt, whom Calvin claims Hobbes ate when he made fun of him, Filthy Rich, who Calvin claims some bullies got by grabbing him at the drinking fountain, Candace, who has the desk nearest Susie, Ronald, whom Calvin uses as the butt of his "invisible Cretinizer" joke, Jessica, whom in one story arc Susie passes gossip notes to via Calvin, and another student named Tommy whom Calvin claims had milk go up his nose while telling a funny story. Most of these are only mentioned by name in conversation. Apart from Candace and Ronald, those who do physically appear in the strip remain unnamed. This includes Calvin's baseball teammates, who bully him off the team after he makes a rookie mistake, and kids on the playground who usually are antagonistic to Calvin as well.
