= Wendy Murray =

Wendy Murray (formerly Wendy Murray Zoba, born January 1956) is a writer best known for her books about religion.

Wendy Murray grew up in Chagrin Falls, Ohio and earned a Bachelor of Arts degree from Hiram College, Hiram, Ohio (1980), majoring in religion and graduating magna cum laude. She also received membership in Hiram's Phi Beta Kappa society. She completed a master's degree in theological studies (New Testament) at Gordon-Conwell Theological Seminary, S. Hamilton, Massachusetts, graduating magna cum laude in 1985.

She lived in Honduras, Central America for four years where she served as regional correspondent for Time magazine. She worked as writer and editor at Christianity Today magazine from 1995 to 2000 and served as senior writer there through 2005. Her work has taken her all over the world and her feature essays have won awards consistently. She has published extensively in other journals, including Books & Culture, The Christian Century, and Beliefnet.com. She was cited in Brill's Content as being numbered among the nation's leading religion reporters. She has appeared on "Chris Matthew's Hard Ball," "Religion & Ethics Newsweekly" and was invited to speak before a select group of thought leaders by the Carnegie Council in New York City.

She has served as Writer-in-Residence at Gordon College, Wenham, Massachusetts (2004–2005) and adjunct professor of Communication Arts (2008–2011). She has taught in Gordon College's international studies program in Orvieto, Italy.

She has published 10 nonfiction books. Her book A Mended and Broken Heart, the Life and Love of Francis of Assisi has won solid and enthusiastic support from the Franciscan community, both in America and in Assisi, Italy, where she lived during the writing of the book. Her eleventh book, and first novel, The Warrior King, came out 2010.

Murray is the daughter of Myles N. Murray (deceased), chemist of founder of the Industrial Electronic Rubber Company (IER), and Barbara Bentel Murray. She was married in 1978 and divorced in 2002.
