= Bryan Malessa =

American novelist

Bryan Joachim Malessa (born May 16, 1964, in Chagrin Falls, Ohio) is an American novelist. He is a graduate of the University of California, Berkeley and the Oscar Wilde Centre at Trinity College, Dublin. He lives in greater Los Angeles.

== Novels ==
=== The Flight ===
In reviewing The Flight (Harper Perennial), set on the Eastern Front (World War II), The Irish Times states "With this story...Bryan Malessa joins the ranks of [Nobel Laureate] Günter Grass, Rachel Seiffert and others in taking on the major preoccupations of post-war German literature...and the role of literature in history and memory." In addition, The Independent notes that "The Flight joins a small but growing body of literature on the subject, but the novel does not seek to exonerate the Germans."

=== The War Room ===
In Financial Times, Mark Simpson wrote "Billed as 'an epic investigation into America's underbelly,' The War Room has a Catcher in the Rye quality to it, but without the toxicity."

== Other works ==
He is also coeditor of Re/mapping the Occident (University of California, 1995) and a journalist whose best-known piece is a widely cited career retrospective interview "Once Was King" with World Champion and three-time Tour de France winner Greg LeMond.

== Sources ==
- The Irish Times, Escape From East Prussia

- The Independent (UK) review of The Flight

- Financial Times "The War Room"
- Bryan Malessa, "Once Was King: An interview with Greg LeMond"
