= Little Theatre of Wilkes-Barre =

The Little Theatre of Wilkes-Barre is one of the oldest continuously-running community theatres in the United States.

Founded in 1922 as the Drama League, Little Theatre was incorporated as a non-profit under the new name in 1929. Its first performance was Rudyard Kipling's The Elephant's Child, delivered at what is now Coughlin High School in Wilkes-Barre.

Little Theatre purchased its current location, a former movie theatre, in 1956. Following renovations, performances at the new location began in 1957.

== History ==
Little Theatre was incorporated as a non-profit, 501(c) 3 Corporation by decree of Judge Valentine on June 17, 1929. Bernard F. Burgunder, Brandon A. Gearhart, Mrs. Fredrick Hillman, Mrs. Simon Long, Todd Rippard, Raijean Breese, Mrs. Franck G. Darte, Annette Evans, Mrs. Hugh Jenkins, Mrs. Ernest G. Smith, Daniel W. Davis and Leonard W. Parkhurst were the members, incorporators, and directors.

Since 1923, Little Theatre has reached over two million people, presenting hundreds of productions.

During the 1920s and 30s, “little theatres” proved to be a testing ground for new plays and talent, as well as a place to develop professionalism, foster self-expression, and have fun!

Little Theatre of Wilkes-Barre is the 3rd continuously running community theatre in the United States, and is still ranked among the 10 best “little theatre” groups in the land and is a charter member of American National Theatre and Academy.

Little Theatre of Wilkes-Barre made its home at the 537 N. Main Street Playhouse in 1957. The building, an old movie theatre, was purchased in 1956 and renovated for theatrical stage use. In 1972, because of renewed federal and state interest in the fine arts, the Pennsylvania Theatre Association approved the building for production, and remarked on the splendid facilities of the stage and equipment.
