= Lois Rostow Kuznets =

Lois Rostow Kuznets is a professor emeritus of English at San Diego State University, specializing in children's literature. Her best-known book, When Toys Come Alive, studies narratives featuring living toys such as Calvin and Hobbes and Winnie the Pooh, arguing that the toys function as transitional objects that mediate between childhood and adult desires. The book won multiple awards. . She was also President of the Children's Literature Association.
