= Lee Salem (editor) =

American comic strip editor (1946–2019)

Lee Salem (July 21, 1946 – September 2, 2019) was an American comic strip editor who worked at Universal Press Syndicate from 1974 until his retirement in 2014. While working at Universal, he helped to develop such highly regarded comic strips as For Better or For Worse, Calvin & Hobbes, and La Cucaracha, in addition to discovering Cathy and The Boondocks. According to the Los Angeles Times, "Beloved by a tight circle of industry artists, Salem’s keen eye for finding talented and idiosyncratic writers and cartoonists lead to the syndication of some of the best and most daring American comic strips of the last quarter of the 20th century."

== Biography ==
Salem was born in Orlando, Florida, on July 21, 1946, to Louis and Rosemary Salem. He grew up in Boston, Massachusetts and Portsmouth, New Hampshire. He received his bachelor's degree from Park College and his master's degree from the University of Missouri, Kansas City, both in English. In 1974, he began working at Universal Press Syndicate as an assistant editor, where he was promoted to vice president and editorial director in 1981. In 2006, he became president of Universal Press Syndicate, a position he held until his retirement in 2014. In 2013, he received the Silver T-Square Award from the National Cartoonists Society. On August 19, 2019, Salem suffered a stroke from which he died on September 2 of that year at his home in Leawood, Kansas.
