= Jef Mallett =

American cartoonist

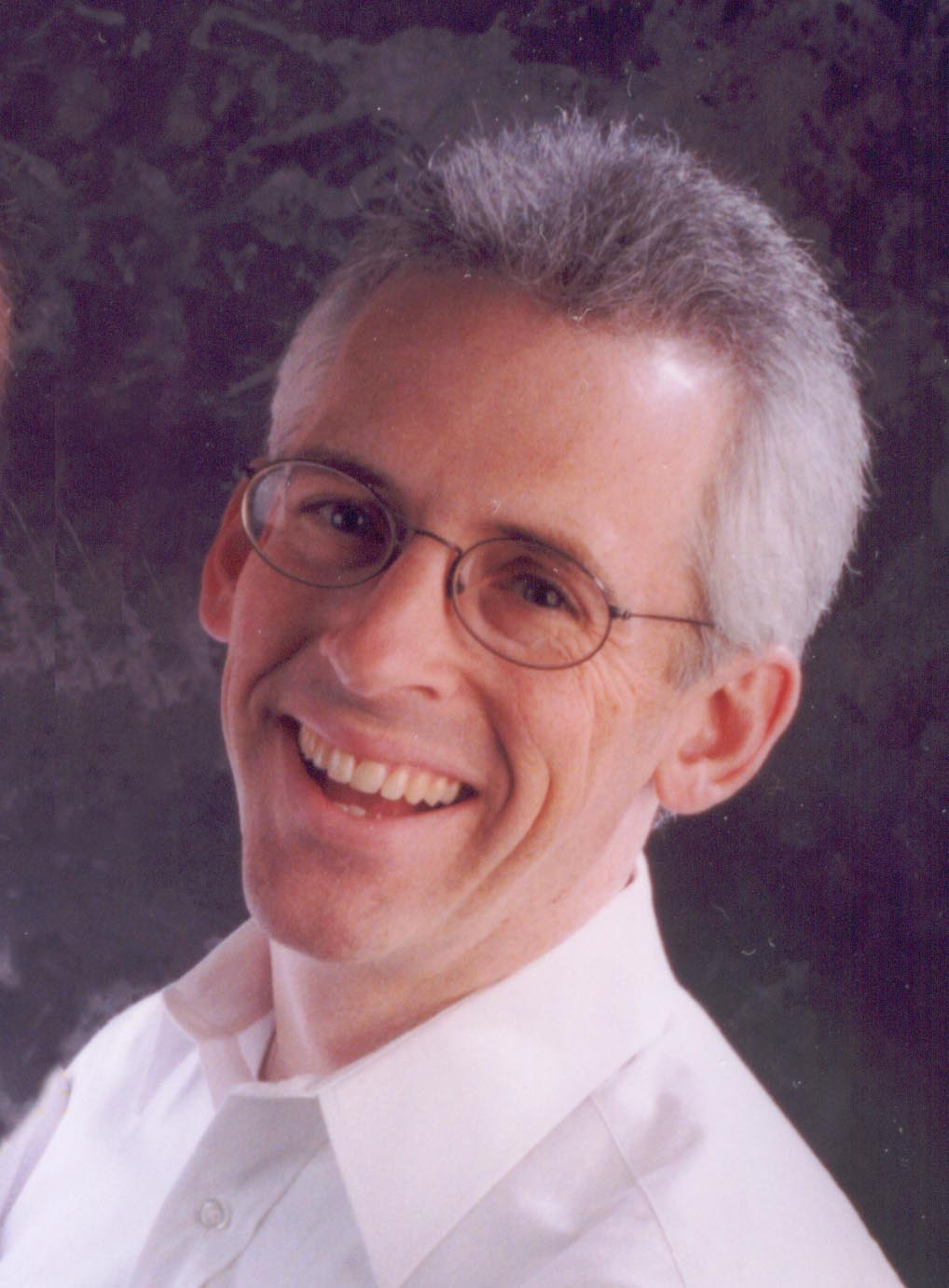
- Born: February 28, 1962 (age 64) Lansing, Michigan
- Areas: artist, writer, triathlete
- Notable works: Frazz, Trizophrenia: Inside the Minds of a Triathlete
- Awards: full list

Jef Mallett (born 1962) is an American cartoonist best known as the creator and artist of the nationally syndicated comic strip Frazz.

== Early and personal life ==
Mallett attended nursing school as well as EMT training before leaving to pursue his artistic interests. He has a longtime interest in bicycling and hanggliding and is an avid triathlete, having completed his first triathlon in 1981 (coming in 9th). He has twice completed the Ironman Triathlon. He is married to Patty and lives in Huntington Woods, Michigan, United States.

== Career ==
While in high school, Mallett published his first comic strip for his local newspaper, the Big Rapids Pioneer. His first comic series was entitled "Birchbark", featuring a French-Canadian trapper. After becoming a graphic artist, he worked in that capacity for regional newspapers, the Grand Rapids Press and the Flint Journal. Afterwards, Mallett left the commercial world to concentrate on Frazz full-time.

== Accomplishments ==
=== Books ===
- Dangerous Dan (children's book). Willowisp Press (1996) ISBN 978-0-87406-720-0
- Live at Bryson Elementary. Andrews McMeel Publishing (2005) 128 pages. Includes foreword by Gene Weingarten and introduction by Jef Mallett. ISBN 0-7407-5447-5
- 99% Perspiration. Andrews McMeel Publishing (2006) 128 pages. ISBN 0-7407-6043-2
- Frazz 3.1416. Andrews McMeel Publishing (20089) 128 pages. ISBN 0-7407-7739-4. Includes an introduction by Charles Solomon
- Trizophrenia: Inside the Minds of a Triathlete VeloPress (2009) ISBN 978-1-934030-44-8

=== Illustrations ===
- Live Albom II by Mitch Albom, Detroit Free Press, Inc. (1990) ISBN 978-0-937247-19-8
- Mallett donated cover artwork for the Bob and Tom Show CD: Operation Radio which was distributed for free to US Servicemen, serving overseas, as part of the USO's Operation Care Package.
- Created the artwork for the Bob and Tom Show CD: Man Boobs (2006).
- Roadie: The Misunderstood World of a Bike Racer by Jamie Smith, published Spring 2008 by VeloPress.

=== Other ===
- He was 2005 commencement speaker at University of Michigan–Flint.
- Participated in Nevada Passage, which featured two-person teams competing in cycling, kayaking, and other outdoor events during a 2006 reality television program; his partner was adventure journalist Stefani Jackenthal, another all-American triathlete.

== Awards ==
- 2003 annual Wilbur Award from the Religion Communicators Council for "Excellence in Communicating Values and Ethics", for Frazz.
