= Calvin and Hobbes =

Comic strip by Bill Watterson

- The cover of Calvin and Hobbes, the first collection of comic strips, released in April 1987.
- Author: Bill Watterson
- Current status/schedule: Concluded
- Launch date: November 18, 1985; 41 years ago
- End date: December 31, 1995; 30 years ago
- Syndicate: Universal Press Syndicate
- Publisher: Andrews McMeel Publishing
- Genre(s): Humor, family life, philosophy, satire

Calvin and Hobbes is an American daily comic strip created by cartoonist Bill Watterson and syndicated from November 18, 1985, to December 31, 1995. The strip centers on Calvin, a six-year-old boy characterized by his vivid imagination and rowdy behavior, and Hobbes, his stuffed tiger, who is a sentient being to Calvin but a regular toy to everyone else. Set in the contemporary United States, the strip includes a recurring cast such as Calvin's parents, his classmate Susie Derkins, his teacher Miss Wormwood, and his babysitter Rosalyn.

A recurring element of the strip is Calvin's use of imagination, often depicted through alter egos such as Spaceman Spiff and Stupendous Man, as well as his reinterpretation of everyday objects, including cardboard boxes, as devices such as time machines. Watterson's artistic style, influenced by earlier comic strips including Peanuts, Pogo, and Krazy Kat, developed over time to incorporate more varied panel layouts and watercolor illustrations in Sunday strips.

At its peak, Calvin and Hobbes was published in more than 2,000 newspapers internationally. Watterson firmly opposed the licensing of the strip's characters for commercial merchandise and engaged in disputes with his syndicate regarding creative control. As such, no official merchandise or animated adaptations were produced during the strip's original run. Watterson ended the strip in 1995, stating that he had explored the format to his satisfaction.

Described by some commentators as "the last great newspaper comic", Calvin and Hobbes has enjoyed enduring popularity and influence. The 18 official book collections have sold millions of copies globally, and the strip continues to attract significant academic and philosophical interest. In 2014, Watterson's contributions to the medium were recognized with the Grand Prix at the Angoulême International Comics Festival, cementing the strip's legacy as one of the most celebrated works in comic history.

== History ==
=== Development ===
I thought it was perhaps too 'adult,' too literate. When my then-8-year-old son remarked, 'This is the Doonesbury for kids!' I suspected we had something unusual on our hands.

— Lee Salem, Watterson's editor at Universal, recalling his reaction after seeing Watterson's first submission

Bill Watterson conceived and developed Calvin and Hobbes while working in advertising. United Feature Syndicate agreed to publish one strip titled The Doghouse, which featured a side character (the main character's little brother) who had a stuffed tiger. The syndicate identified these characters as the strongest and encouraged Watterson to develop them as the focus of their own strip. United Feature ultimately rejected the new strip as lacking marketing potential, although Universal Press Syndicate took it up.

=== Publication and syndication ===
The first Calvin and Hobbes strip was published in 35 newspapers on November 18, 1985. Within a year of syndication, the strip appeared in approximately 250 newspapers and achieved wide international circulation in translation.

As the strip grew in popularity, the syndicate expressed strong interest in merchandising the characters and expanding into other media. By 1991, Watterson secured a contract granting him legal control over the strip and all future licensing arrangements. After gaining creative control, Watterson relocated to New Mexico and largely disappeared from public engagements, refusing to attend ceremonies for the cartooning awards he won.

In 1995, Watterson announced that Calvin and Hobbes would conclude at the end of the year. He stated that he had achieved his intended goals within the medium. The final strip ran on Sunday, December 31, 1995, depicting Calvin and Hobbes sledding down a hill after a fresh snowfall, with Calvin delivering the final lines: "It's a magical world, Hobbes, ol' buddy... Let's go exploring!"

Speaking to NPR in 2005, animation critic Charles Solomon opined that the final strip "left behind a hole in the comics page that no strip has been able to fill." After the strip concluded, it was described as "the last great newspaper comic".

Comparison of Calvin and Hobbes's following layout changes
The comic strip from 1987 shown on the left illustrates the layout constraints that Bill Watterson was required to work within for the first six years of the comic's syndication. The comic strip on the right from 1993 demonstrates one of the more creative layouts that Watterson was free to employ after 1991.

== Conflicts ==
=== Merchandising ===
Almost no legitimate Calvin and Hobbes merchandise exists. Watterson believed that comic strips should be regarded as an art form. Although he did not initially oppose all forms of merchandising, he rejected an early syndication deal that would have involved incorporating a more marketable, licensed character named Robotman into the strip.

When Calvin and Hobbes was accepted by Universal Syndicate and grew in popularity, Watterson disagreed with the syndicate, which urged him to merchandise the characters and tour the country to promote the first strip collections. Watterson refused, believing that the integrity of the strip and its artist would be undermined by commercialization, which he saw as a major negative influence in the world of cartoon art, and that licensing his characters would violate the spirit of his work. However, having signed away merchandising control in his initial contract with the syndicate, Watterson began a lengthy and emotionally draining battle with Universal to gain control over his work. Ultimately, Universal did not approve any products against Watterson's wishes, understanding that, unlike with comic strips, it would be nearly impossible to separate the creator from the strip if Watterson chose to walk away. One estimate suggests that Watterson forwent $300–$400 million.

=== Animation ===
In a 1989 interview in The Comics Journal, Watterson described the appeal of being able to do things with a moving image that a simple drawing cannot achieve: the distortion, the exaggeration, and the control over the length of time an event is viewed. Although the visual possibilities of animation appealed to Watterson, the idea of finding a voice for Calvin made him uncomfortable, as did the idea of working with a team of animators. Ultimately, Calvin and Hobbes was never made into an animated series. Watterson later stated in The Calvin and Hobbes Tenth Anniversary Book that he liked that his strip was a "low-tech, one-man operation", and that he was proud to have drawn every line and written every word himself. Calls from major Hollywood figures interested in adapting his work, including Jim Henson, George Lucas, and Steven Spielberg, were never returned. In a 2013 interview, Watterson stated that he had no interest in an animated adaptation, as he saw no upside to it.

== Style and artistic influences ==
The strip borrows several elements and themes from three major influences: Walt Kelly's Pogo, George Herriman's Krazy Kat, and Charles M. Schulz's Peanuts. Schulz and Kelly particularly influenced Watterson's outlook on comics during his formative years.

=== Production and technique ===
Watterson's artistic style features diverse and often exaggerated character expressions, particularly Calvin's. Watterson experimented freely with different panel layouts, art styles, stories without dialogue, and greater use of white space. Watterson intentionally leaves certain elements to the reader's imagination, stating that the imagined results are "more outrageous" than what he could portray.

Watterson's technique began with minimalist pencil sketches drawn with a light pencil (though the larger Sunday strips often required more elaborate work) on Strathmore brand Bristol board. He then used a small sable brush and India ink to fill in the rest of the drawing, preferring not to simply trace his penciling in order to keep the inking spontaneous. Mistakes were covered with various forms of correction fluid, including typewriter fluid. Watterson lettered dialogue with a Rapidograph fountain pen, and used a crowquill pen for odds and ends.

Watterson spent considerable time choosing colors for the weekly Sunday strip. He cut the syndicate's color tabs into individual squares, laid them out, painted a watercolor approximation on tracing paper over the Bristol board, and marked the strip accordingly before sending it out. When Calvin and Hobbes began, there were 64 colors available for the Sunday strips. For his later Sunday strips, Watterson had 125 colors and the ability to fade them into each other.

== Characters and recurring themes ==
The strip features two titular characters, six-year-old Calvin and his stuffed tiger Hobbes, along with a small recurring cast including Calvin's unnamed parents, his classmate and neighbor Susie Derkins, his teacher Miss Wormwood, and his babysitter Rosalyn, and school bully Moe.

=== Friendship and antics ===
A major recurring theme is Calvin and Hobbes's antics, which usually lead to trouble, often with Hobbes foreshadowing the outcome. The two also frequently argue and fight, often stemming from attempts to prove superiority while playing or talking. These conflicts usually end in a truce.

=== Art and academia ===
Watterson used the strip to poke fun at the art world, principally through Calvin's unconventional snowman creations but also through other expressions of childhood art. For example, when Miss Wormwood complains that he is wasting class time drawing impossible things, Calvin occasionally describes his art as on the cutting edge of the avant-garde. Watterson explains that he adapted this jargon from an actual book of art criticism.

Watterson also lampooned academia. Calvin indulges in what Watterson calls "pop psychobabble" to justify his destructive rampages and shift blame to his parents, citing "toxic codependency". The Sunday, June 21, 1992, strip criticized the naming of the Big Bang theory as not evocative of the wonders behind it and coined the term "Horrendous Space Kablooie", an alternative that achieved some informal popularity among scientists and was often shortened to "the HSK". The term has also been referred to in newspapers, books and university courses.

=== Calvin's alter egos ===
Calvin imagines himself as many creatures and other people, including dinosaurs, elephants, jungle-farers, and superheroes. Three of his alter egos are well-defined and recurrent. The first is Spaceman Spiff, an astronaut who explores the galaxy; Watterson has stated that the idea of Spaceman Spiff came from an earlier attempt at a cartoon character called Spaceman Mort, who wore a mustache, smoked a cigar, and was meant as a parody of Flash Gordon. The canyons and deserts featured in many Spaceman Spiff stories are based on southern Utah landscapes. The second is Tracer Bullet, a hardboiled private eye. He debuted when Calvin donned a fedora to hide a terrible haircut Hobbes had given him. Tracer Bullet stories are drawn in an elaborate, shadowy black-and-white style evoking film noir; Watterson drew them infrequently because the inking was time-consuming. The third main alter ego is Stupendous Man, a superhero who wears a mask and cape made by Calvin's mother and narrates his own adventures. When his antics frustrate others, Calvin unsuccessfully claims he and Stupendous Man are different people. Stupendous Man has multiple superpowers, including flight, "high-speed vision", "muscles of magnitude", and a "stomach of steel".

=== Cardboard boxes ===
Calvin duplicating himself using a cardboard box, as seen on the cover of Scientific Progress Goes "Boink"

Calvin has several adventures involving corrugated cardboard boxes, adapting them for imaginative uses including time travel and self-duplication. In one strip, Calvin shows off his Transmogrifier, a device that transforms its user into any desired creature or item.

=== Calvinball ===
Calvin and Hobbes playing Calvinball with an assortment of sporting equipment

Other kids' games are all such a bore!
They've gotta have rules and they gotta keep score!
Calvinball is better by far!
It's never the same! It's always bizarre!
You don't need a team or a referee!
You know that it's great, 'cause it's named after me!

— Excerpt from the Calvinball theme song

Calvinball is an improvisational game introduced in a 1990 storyline involving Calvin's negative experience joining the school baseball team. Portrayed as a rebellion against conventional team sports, the game became a staple during the comic's final five years. Its only consistent rules are that it may never be played with the same rules twice and that each participant must wear a mask.

When asked how to play, Watterson stated, "It's pretty simple: you make up the rules as you go."

=== Wagon and sled rides ===
Calvin and Hobbes frequently ride downhill in a wagon or sled (depending on the season) as a device to add some physical comedy to the strip and because, according to Watterson, "it's a lot more interesting ... than talking heads". While sometimes the focus of the strip, the ride frequently serves as a visual metaphor while Calvin ponders the meaning of life, death, God, or other weighty subjects. Calvin and Hobbes's sled has been described as "the most famous sled in American arts since Citizen Kane."

=== G.R.O.S.S. (Get Rid Of Slimy girlS) ===
G.R.O.S.S. (Get Rid Of Slimy girlS) is a club consisting only of Calvin and Hobbes. Calvin names himself "Dictator-for-Life" and Hobbes "President-and-First-Tiger". They hold meetings in Calvin's treehouse, which frequently devolve into fights.

== Books ==
Eighteen Calvin and Hobbes books were published between 1987 and 1997. These include 11 collections forming a complete archive of the newspaper strips, except for a single daily strip from November 28, 1985 (the collections contain a strip for this date, but not the one that appeared in some newspapers).

Treasuries usually combine the two preceding collections with color reprints of Sunday comics and new material by Watterson.

A complete collection of Calvin and Hobbes strips in three hardcover volumes totaling 1,440 pages was released on October 4, 2005 by Andrews McMeel Publishing. It includes color prints of the art used on paperback covers, the treasuries' extra illustrated stories and poems, and a new introduction by Bill Watterson discussing his inspirations and the story leading up to the strip's publication. The alternate 1985 strip is still omitted, and three other strips (January 7 and November 24, 1987, and November 25, 1988) have altered dialogue. A four-volume paperback version was released on November 13, 2012. Between 2023 and 2026 Andrews McMeel publisher has released The Calvin and Hobbes Portable Compendium, a series of seven paperback sets, each containing two books.

=== Teaching with Calvin and Hobbes ===
An officially licensed children's textbook titled Teaching with Calvin and Hobbes was published in a single print run in Fargo, North Dakota, in 1993. The book is composed of Calvin and Hobbes strips forming story arcs, including "The Binoculars" and "The Bug Collection", followed by lessons based on the stories.

What do you think the principal meant when he said they had "quite a file" on Calvin?

— Teaching with Calvin and Hobbes

The book is rare and highly sought after, and has been called the "Holy Grail" for Calvin and Hobbes collectors.

== Reception ==
In 1990, Ken Tucker of Entertainment Weekly gave the strip an A+ rating, writing, "Watterson summons up the pain and confusion of childhood as much as he does its innocence and fun."

=== Academic response ===
In her 1994 book When Toys Come Alive, Lois Rostow Kuznets theorizes that Hobbes serves both as a figure in Calvin's childish fantasy life and as an outlet for libidinous desires typically associated with adults. Kuznets also analyzes Calvin's other fantasies, suggesting they are a second tier of fantasies used in settings like school, where transitional objects like Hobbes are socially unacceptable.

In a 2009 evaluation of the entire body of Calvin and Hobbes strips using grounded theory methodology, Christijan D. Draper found that "[o]verall, Calvin and Hobbes suggests that meaningful time use is a key attribute of a life well lived," and that "the strip suggests one way to assess the meaning associated with time use is through preemptive retrospection by which a person looks at current experiences through the lens of an anticipated future..."

=== Related exhibitions ===
A collection of original Sunday strips was exhibited at Ohio State University's Billy Ireland Cartoon Library & Museum in 2001. Watterson selected the strips and provided commentary for the exhibition catalog, which was later published by Andrews McMeel as Calvin and Hobbes: Sunday Pages 1985–1995.

The museum hosted another exhibition of the strips in 2014 titled Exploring Calvin and Hobbes. Andrews McMeel published a catalog of the same title in 2015, featuring an interview with Watterson by museum curator Jenny Robb.

== Legacy ==
Since its concluding panel in 1995, Calvin and Hobbes has remained one of the most influential and well-loved comic strips of our time.

— The Atlantic, "How Calvin and Hobbes Inspired a Generation," October 25, 2013

Since its original newspaper run ended, Calvin and Hobbes has continued to influence entertainment, art, and fandom.

=== In film and television ===
On television, Calvin and Hobbes have been satirically depicted in stop-motion animation in Robot Chicken, traditional animation in Family Guy, in the live-action series Community, and on the animated series MAD.

The 2013 American documentary film Dear Mr. Watterson explores the impact and legacy of Calvin and Hobbes through interviews with authors, curators, historians, and numerous professional cartoonists. The documentary references the book Looking for Calvin and Hobbes: The Unconventional Story of Bill Watterson and His Revolutionary Comic Strip by Nevin Martell.

=== Awards and influence ===
The jury of the Angoulême International Comics Festival recognized the strip's significance to international cartooning by awarding its 2014 Grand Prix to Watterson, only the fourth American to receive the honor (after Will Eisner, Robert Crumb, and Art Spiegelman).

Several artists have published comics inspired by Calvin and Hobbes. Examples include the 2002 comic strip Macanudo, by Liniers, and the 2005 Marvel comic book Fantastic Four Presents: Franklin Richards - Son of A Genius, by Chris Eliopoulos and Marc Sumerak. Other art mimicking the Calvin and Hobbes style includes 2015 drawings of Star Wars: The Force Awakens characters by Disney artist Brian Kesinger, and memes from the Donald and Hobbes subreddit parodying Donald Trump during the 2016 election.

=== In politics ===
References to Calvin and Hobbes have been used in the context of United States politics and law. In 2022, Aaron Regunberg in The New Republic criticized the Roberts Court as playing Calvinball with respect to its constitutional law decisions. In a concurring/dissenting opinion in the 2025 case National Institutes of Health v. American Public Health Association, United States Supreme Court Justice Ketanji Brown Jackson referenced Calvinball in describing the behavior of the Court's majority, saying:

This is Calvinball jurisprudence with a twist. Calvinball has only one rule: There are no fixed rules. We seem to have two: that one, and this Administration always wins.

=== Calvin as an adult ===
The concept of Calvin as a teenager or adult has inspired various writers. In 2011, cartoonists Dan and Tom Heyerman launched a webcomic called Hobbes and Bacon. The strip depicts Calvin as an adult, married to Susie Derkins with a young daughter named after philosopher Francis Bacon, to whom Calvin gives Hobbes. Though originally consisting of only four strips, Hobbes and Bacon received considerable attention and was continued by other artists.

In June 2021 the comic strip Bloom County ran a crossover storyline in which its characters and Hobbes go in search of Calvin. The story ends when Hobbes is reunited with an adult Calvin.

Author Martine Leavitt published the novel Calvin in 2015. The story follows seventeen-year-old Calvin—born the day the comic strip ended and recently diagnosed with schizophrenia—and his hallucination of his childhood stuffed tiger, Hobbes. With his friend Susie, who might also be a hallucination, Calvin sets off to find Bill Watterson in the hope that the cartoonist can provide aid for Calvin's condition.

Critics have noted that the titular character of the comic strip Frazz shares a similar appearance and personality to a grown-up Calvin. Creator Jef Mallett stated that while Watterson inspires him, the similarities are unintentional.

== Bibliography ==
- Watterson, Bill (1995). The Calvin and Hobbes Tenth Anniversary Book. Kansas City, Missouri: Andrews and McMeel. ISBN 0-8362-0438-7.
- Watterson, Bill (2001). Calvin and Hobbes: Sunday Pages 1985–1995. Kansas City, Missouri: Andrews McMeel Publishing. ISBN 0-7407-2135-6.
- Watterson, Bill (2005). The Complete Calvin and Hobbes. Kansas City, Missouri: Andrews McMeel Publishing. ISBN 0-7407-4847-5.
- Martell, Nevin (2010). Looking for Calvin and Hobbes: The Unconventional Story of Bill Watterson and His Revolutionary Comic Strip (Revised ed.). Continuum Books. ISBN 978-1-4411-0685-8.
- Heit, Jamey (2012). Imagination and Meaning in Calvin and Hobbes. Jefferson, North Carolina: McFarland & Company. ISBN 978-0-7864-9031-8.
- Watterson, Bill (2015). Exploring Calvin and Hobbes: An Exhibition Catalogue. Kansas City, Missouri: Andrews McMeel Publishing. ISBN 978-1-4494-6036-5.
- Suellentrop, Chris (November 7, 2005). "Calvin and Hobbes: The last great newspaper comic strip". Slate. Archived from the original on January 8, 2012.
- Markstein, Donald D. Calvin and Hobbes at Don Markstein's Toonopedia. Archived from the original on April 13, 2012.
- Lew, Michele. Calvin and Hobbes, April 5, 2022 at The Encyclopedia of Cleveland History. Archived from the original August 7, 2022.
