= Bill Watterson =

American cartoonist (born 1958)

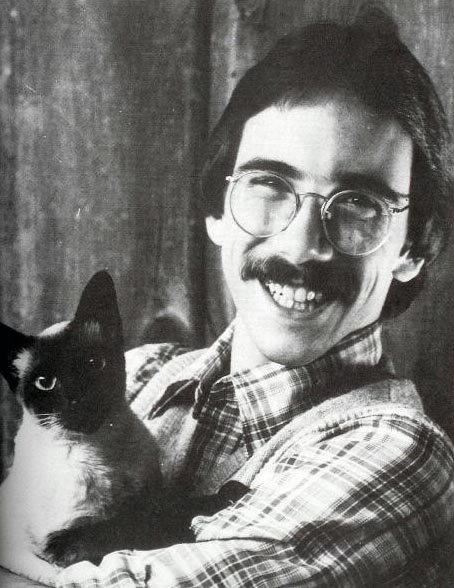
- Watterson in a Kenyon College yearbook photo in 1980
- Born: William Boyd Watterson II; July 5, 1958 (age 68); Washington, D.C., U.S.
- Education: Kenyon College (BA)
- Occupation: Cartoonist
- Spouse: Melissa Richmond (m. 1983)
- Children: 1

William Boyd Watterson II (born July 5, 1958) is an American cartoonist who authored the comic strip Calvin and Hobbes. The strip was syndicated from 1985 to 1995. Watterson concluded Calvin and Hobbes with a short statement to newspaper readers that he felt he had achieved all he could in the medium. Watterson is known for his negative views on comic syndication and licensing, his efforts to expand and elevate the newspaper comic as an art form, and his move back into private life after Calvin and Hobbes ended.

Watterson was born in Washington, D.C., and grew up in Chagrin Falls, Ohio. The suburban Midwestern United States setting of Ohio was part of the inspiration for the setting of Calvin and Hobbes. Watterson has kept a low profile since retiring from the comics industry, and he currently lives in Cleveland Heights, Ohio. He cited works from Charles Schulz, Richard Thompson, Winsor McCay, George Herriman, Walt Kelly, Jim Borgman, Paul Coker, Chuck Jones and Tex Avery as his main influences.

== Early life ==
Bill Watterson was born on July 5, 1958, in Washington, D.C., to Kathryn Watterson (1933–2022) and James Godfrey Watterson (1932–2016). His father worked as a patent attorney. In 1965, six-year-old Watterson and his family moved to Chagrin Falls, Ohio, a suburb of Cleveland. Watterson has a younger brother, Thomas Watterson, who lives in Austin, Texas, and worked as a musician before becoming an educator.

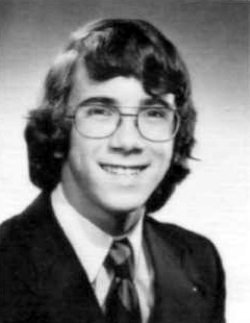
Watterson during his high school years in 1976

Watterson drew his first cartoon at age eight and spent much time in his childhood alone drawing and cartooning. This continued through his school years, during which time he discovered comic strips such as Walt Kelly's Pogo, George Herriman's Krazy Kat, and Charles M. Schulz's Peanuts which subsequently inspired and influenced his desire to become a professional cartoonist. On one occasion when he was in fourth grade, he wrote a letter to Schulz, who responded, much to Watterson's surprise. This made a big impression on him at the time. His parents encouraged him in his artistic pursuits. Later, they recalled him as a "conservative child" — imaginative, but "not in a fantasy way", and certainly nothing like the character of Calvin that he later created. Watterson found avenues for his cartooning talents throughout primary and secondary school, creating high school-themed super hero comics with his friends and contributing cartoons and art to the school newspaper and yearbook.

After high school, Watterson attended Kenyon College, where he majored in political science. He had already decided on a career in cartooning but he felt studying political science would help him move into editorial cartooning. He continued to develop his art skills and during his sophomore year he painted Michelangelo's Creation of Adam on the ceiling of his dormitory room. He also contributed cartoons to the college newspaper, some of which included the original "Spaceman Spiff" cartoons. (Note: Many of these early cartoons are archived online.) Watterson graduated from Kenyon in 1980 with a Bachelor of Arts degree.

Later, when Watterson was creating names for the characters in his comic strip, he decided on Calvin (after the Protestant reformer John Calvin) and Hobbes (after the political philosopher Thomas Hobbes), allegedly as a "tip of the hat" to Kenyon's political science department. In The Complete Calvin and Hobbes, Watterson stated that Calvin was named for "a 16th-century theologian who believed in predestination" and Hobbes for "a 17th-century philosopher with a dim view of human nature".

== Career ==
=== Early work ===
Watterson was inspired by the work of The Cincinnati Enquirer political cartoonist Jim Borgman, a 1976 graduate of Kenyon College, and decided to try to follow the same career path as Borgman, who in turn offered support and encouragement to the aspiring artist. Watterson graduated in 1980 and was hired on a trial basis at the Cincinnati Post, a competing paper of the Enquirer. Watterson quickly discovered that the job was full of unexpected challenges which prevented him from performing his duties to the standards set for him. Not the least of these challenges was his unfamiliarity with the Cincinnati political scene, as he had never resided in or near the city, having grown up in the Cleveland area and attended college in central Ohio. The Post fired Watterson before his contract was up.

He then joined a small advertising agency and worked there for four years as a designer, creating grocery advertisements while also working on his own projects, including development of his own cartoon strip and contributions to Target: The Political Cartoon Quarterly.

As a freelance artist, Watterson has drawn other works for various merchandise, including album art for his brother's band, calendars, clothing graphics, educational books, magazine covers, posters, and post cards.

=== Calvin and Hobbes and rise to success ===
Watterson has said that he works for personal fulfillment. As he told the graduating class of 1990 at Kenyon College, "It's surprising how hard we'll work when the work is done just for ourselves." Calvin and Hobbes was first published on November 18, 1985. In Calvin and Hobbes Tenth Anniversary Book, he wrote that his influences included Peanuts, Pogo, and Krazy Kat. Watterson wrote the introduction to the first volume of The Komplete Kolor Krazy Kat. Watterson's style also reflects the influence of Winsor McCay's Little Nemo in Slumberland.

Like many artists, Watterson incorporated elements of his life, interests, beliefs, and values into his work—for example, his hobby as a cyclist, memories of his own father's speeches about "building character", and his views on merchandising and corporations. Watterson's cat Sprite very much inspired the personality and physical features of Hobbes.

Watterson spent much of his career trying to change the climate of newspaper comics. He believed that the artistic value of comics was being undermined and that the space that they occupied in newspapers continually decreased, subject to arbitrary whims of shortsighted publishers. Furthermore, he stated that art should not be judged by the medium for which it is created (i.e., there is no "high" art or "low" art—just art).

Watterson wrote a foreword for a FoxTrot collection.

=== Fight against merchandising his characters ===
For years, Watterson battled against pressure from publishers to merchandise his work, something that he felt would cheapen his comic through compromising the act of creation or reading. Early in his career, he was more open minded about possibly doing a television or film animated adaptation, stating he had admiration for the work of Walt Disney and thought animation could open up new avenues in creativity not available through the comic strip format, but he later backed away from the idea when he became nervous of the characters having voice actors and the high level of work involved with animation.

He refused to merchandise his creations on the grounds that displaying Calvin and Hobbes images on commercially sold mugs, stickers, and T-shirts would devalue the characters and their personalities. Watterson said that Universal kept putting pressure on him and that he had signed his contract without fully perusing it because, as a new artist, he was happy just to find a syndicate willing to give him a chance (two other syndicates had previously turned him down). He added that the contract was so one-sided that, if Universal really wanted to, they could license his characters against his will, and could even fire him and continue Calvin and Hobbes with a new artist. Watterson's position eventually won out, and he was able to renegotiate his contract so that he would receive all rights to his work. Later he said that the licensing fight exhausted him and contributed to the need for a nine-month sabbatical in 1991.

Despite Watterson's efforts, many unofficial knockoffs have been found, including items that depict Calvin and Hobbes consuming alcohol or Calvin urinating on a logo. Watterson has said, "Only thieves and vandals have made money on Calvin and Hobbes merchandise."

Only three pieces of official merchandise featuring Calvin and Hobbes were ever produced: two wall calendars for 1988-1989 and 1989-1990, and an educational book titled "Teaching with Calvin and Hobbes" in 1993.

=== Changing the format of the Sunday strip ===
Watterson was critical of the prevailing format for the Sunday comic strip that was in place when he began drawing (and remained so, to varying degrees). The typical layout consisted of three rows with eight total squares, which took up half a page if published with its normal size. (Note: In this context, half-page is an absolute size – approximately half a nominal 8 1/2-by-11-inch (22 cm × 28 cm) page size – and not related to the actual page size on which a cartoon might eventually be printed for distribution.) Some newspapers were restricted with space for their Sunday features and reduced the size of the strip. One of the more common ways was to cut out the top two panels, which Watterson believed forced him to waste the space on throwaway jokes that did not always fit the strip.

While he was set to return from his first sabbatical, Watterson discussed with his syndicate a new format for Calvin and Hobbes that would enable him to use his space more efficiently and would almost require the papers to publish it as a half-page. Universal agreed that they would sell the strip as the half-page and nothing else, which garnered anger from papers and criticism for Watterson from both editors and some of his fellow cartoonists (whom he described as "unnecessarily hot-tempered"). Eventually, Universal compromised and agreed to offer papers a choice between the full half-page or a reduced-sized version to alleviate concerns about the size issue. Watterson conceded that this caused him to lose space in many papers, but he said that, in the end, it was a benefit because he felt that he was giving the papers' readers a better strip for their money and editors were free not to run Calvin and Hobbes at their own risk. He added that he was not going to apologize for drawing a popular feature.

=== End of Calvin and Hobbes ===
On November 9, 1995, Watterson announced the end of Calvin and Hobbes with the following letter to newspaper editors:

Dear Reader:

I will be stopping Calvin and Hobbes at the end of the year. This was not a recent or an easy decision, and I leave with some sadness. My interests have shifted, however, and I believe I've done what I can do within the constraints of daily deadlines and small panels. I am eager to work at a more thoughtful pace, with fewer artistic compromises. I have not yet decided on future projects, but my relationship with Universal Press Syndicate will continue.

That so many newspapers would carry Calvin and Hobbes is an honor I'll long be proud of, and I've greatly appreciated your support and indulgence over the last decade. Drawing this comic strip has been a privilege and a pleasure, and I thank you for giving me the opportunity.

Sincerely,

Bill Watterson

The last strip of Calvin and Hobbes was published on December 31, 1995.

== After Calvin and Hobbes ==
In the years since Calvin and Hobbes was ended, many attempts have been made to contact Watterson. Both The Plain Dealer and the Cleveland Scene sent reporters, in 1998 and 2003 respectively, but neither was able to make contact with the media-shy Watterson. Since 1995, Watterson has taken up painting, at one point drawing landscapes of the woods with his father. He has kept away from the public eye and shown no interest in resuming the strip, creating new works based on the strip's characters, or embarking on new commercial projects, though he has published several Calvin and Hobbes "treasury collection" anthologies. He does not sign autographs or license his characters. Watterson was once known to sneak autographed copies of his books onto the shelves of the Fireside Bookshop, a family-owned bookstore in his hometown of Chagrin Falls, Ohio. He ended this practice after discovering that some of the autographed books were being sold online for high prices.

Watterson rarely gives interviews or makes public appearances. His lengthiest interviews include the cover story in The Comics Journal No. 127 in February 1989, an interview that appeared in a 1987 issue of Honk Magazine, and one in a 2015 Watterson exhibition catalogue.

On December 21, 1999, a short piece was published in the Los Angeles Times, written by Watterson to mark the forthcoming retirement of Peanuts creator Charles M. Schulz.

Circa 2003, Gene Weingarten of The Washington Post sent Watterson the first edition of the Barnaby book as an incentive, hoping to land an interview. Weingarten passed the book to Watterson's parents, along with a message, and declared that he would wait in his hotel for as long as it took Watterson to contact him. Watterson's editor Lee Salem called the next day to tell Weingarten that the cartoonist would not be coming.

In 2004, Watterson and his wife Melissa bought a home in the Cleveland suburb of Cleveland Heights, Ohio. In 2005, they completed the move from their home in Chagrin Falls to their new residence.

In October 2005, Watterson answered 15 questions submitted by readers. In October 2007, he wrote a review of Schulz and Peanuts, a biography of Charles M. Schulz, in The Wall Street Journal.

In 2008, he provided a foreword for the first book collection of Richard Thompson's Cul de Sac comic strip. In April 2011, a representative for Andrews McMeel received a package from a "William Watterson in Cleveland Heights, Ohio" which contained a 6-by-8-inch (15 cm × 20 cm) oil-on-board painting of Cul de Sac character Petey Otterloop, done by Watterson for the Team Cul de Sac fundraising project for Parkinson's disease in honor of Richard Thompson, who was diagnosed in 2009. Watterson's syndicate revealed that the painting was the first new artwork of his that the syndicate has seen since Calvin and Hobbes ended in 1995.

In October 2009, Nevin Martell published a book called Looking for Calvin and Hobbes, which included a story about the author seeking an interview with Watterson. In his search, he interviews friends, co-workers, and family, but never gets to meet the artist himself.

In early 2010, Watterson was interviewed by The Plain Dealer on the 15th anniversary of the end of Calvin and Hobbes. Explaining his decision to discontinue the strip, he said,

This isn't as hard to understand as people try to make it. By the end of ten years, I'd said pretty much everything I had come there to say. It's always better to leave the party early. If I had rolled along with the strip's popularity and repeated myself for another five, ten, or twenty years, the people now "grieving" for Calvin and Hobbes would be wishing me dead and cursing newspapers for running tedious, ancient strips like mine instead of acquiring fresher, livelier talent. And I'd be agreeing with them. I think some of the reason Calvin and Hobbes still finds an audience today is because I chose not to run the wheels off it. I've never regretted stopping when I did.

In October 2013, the magazine Mental Floss published an interview with Watterson, only the second since the strip ended. Watterson again confirmed that he would not be revisiting Calvin and Hobbes, and that he was satisfied with his decision. He also gave his opinion on the changes in the comic-strip industry and where it would be headed in the future:

Personally, I like paper and ink better than glowing pixels, but to each his own. Obviously the role of comics is changing very fast. On the one hand, I don't think comics have ever been more widely accepted or taken as seriously as they are now. On the other hand, the mass media is disintegrating, and audiences are atomizing. I suspect comics will have less widespread cultural impact and make a lot less money. I'm old enough to find all this unsettling, but the world moves on. All the new media will inevitably change the look, function, and maybe even the purpose of comics, but comics are vibrant and versatile, so I think they'll continue to find relevance one way or another. But they definitely won't be the same as what I grew up with.

In 2013 the documentary Dear Mr. Watterson, exploring the cultural impact of Calvin and Hobbes, was released. Watterson himself did not appear in the film.

On February 26, 2014, Watterson published his first cartoon since the end of Calvin and Hobbes: a poster for the documentary Stripped. He also was one of the interviewed subjects in the film and while never shown on camera, his voice appears on the film.

In 2014, Watterson co-authored The Art of Richard Thompson with Washington Post cartoonist Nick Galifianakis and David Apatoff.

In June 2014, three strips of Pearls Before Swine (published June 4, June 5, and June 6, 2014) featured guest illustrations by Watterson after mutual friend Nick Galifianakis connected him and cartoonist Stephan Pastis, who communicated via e-mail. Pastis likened this unexpected collaboration to getting "a glimpse of Bigfoot". "I thought maybe Stephan and I could do this goofy collaboration and then use the result to raise some money for Parkinson's research in honor of Richard Thompson. It seemed like a perfect convergence", Watterson told The Washington Post. The day that Stephan Pastis returned to his own strip, he paid tribute to Watterson by alluding to the final strip of Calvin and Hobbes from December 31, 1995.

On November 5, 2014, a poster was unveiled, drawn by Watterson for the 2015 Angoulême International Comics Festival where he was awarded the Grand Prix in 2014.

On April 1, 2016, for April Fools' Day, Berkeley Breathed posted on Facebook that Watterson had signed "the franchise over to my 'administration'". He then posted a comic with Calvin, Hobbes, and Opus all featured. The comic is signed by Watterson, though the degree of his involvement was speculative. Breathed posted another "Calvin County" strip featuring Calvin and Hobbes, also "signed" by Watterson on April 1, 2017, along with a fake New York Times story ostensibly detailing the "merger" of the two strips. Berkeley Breathed included Hobbes in a November 27, 2017, strip as a stand-in for the character Steve Dallas. Hobbes has also returned in the June 9, 11, and 12, 2021, strips as a stand-in for Bill The Cat.

=== Exhibitions ===
In 2001, the Billy Ireland Cartoon Library & Museum at Ohio State University mounted an exhibition of Watterson's Sunday strips. He chose thirty-six of his favorites, displaying them with both the original drawing and the colored finished product, with most pieces featuring personal annotations. Watterson also wrote an accompanying essay that served as the foreword for the exhibit, called "Calvin and Hobbes: Sunday Pages 1985–1995", which opened on September 10, 2001. It was taken down in January 2002. The accompanying published catalog had the same title.

From March 22 to August 3, 2014, Watterson exhibited again at the Billy Ireland Cartoon Library & Museum at The Ohio State University. In conjunction with this exhibition, Watterson also participated in an interview with the school. An exhibition catalog named Exploring Calvin and Hobbes was released with the exhibit. The book contained a lengthy interview with Bill Watterson, conducted by Jenny Robb, the curator of the museum.

=== The Mysteries ===
Watterson released his first published work in 28 years on October 10, 2023, called The Mysteries. It was an illustrated "fable for grown-ups" about "what lies beyond human understanding". The work was a collaboration with the illustrator and caricaturist John Kascht.

== Awards and honors ==
Watterson was awarded the National Cartoonists Society's Reuben Award in both 1986 and 1988. Watterson's second Reuben win made him the youngest cartoonist to be so honored, and only the sixth person to win twice, following Milton Caniff, Charles M. Schulz, Dik Browne, Chester Gould, and Jeff MacNelly. Gary Larson is the only cartoonist to win a second Reuben since Watterson.

In 2014, Watterson was awarded the Grand Prix at the Angoulême International Comics Festival for his body of work, becoming just the fourth non-European cartoonist to be so honored in the first 41 years of the event.

- 1986: Reuben Award, Outstanding Cartoonist of the Year
- 1988: Reuben Award, Outstanding Cartoonist of the Year
- 1988: National Cartoonists Society, Newspaper Comic Strips Humor Award
- 1988: Sproing Award, for Tommy og Tigern (Calvin and Hobbes)
- 1989: Harvey Award, Special Award for Humor, for Calvin and Hobbes
- 1990: Harvey Award, Best Syndicated Comic Strip, for Calvin and Hobbes
- 1990: Max & Moritz Prize, Best Comic Strip, for Calvin and Hobbes
- 1991: Harvey Award, Best Syndicated Comic Strip, for Calvin and Hobbes
- 1991: Adamson Award, for Kalle och Hobbe (Calvin and Hobbes)
- 1992: Harvey Award, Best Syndicated Comic Strip, for Calvin and Hobbes
- 1992: Eisner Award, Best Comic Strip Collection, for The Revenge of the Baby-Sat
- 1992: Angoulême International Comics Festival, Prize for Best Foreign Comic Book, for En avant tête de thon!
- 1993: Eisner Award, Best Comic Strip Collection, for Attack of the Deranged Mutant Killer Monster Snow Goons
- 1993: Harvey Award, Best Syndicated Comic Strip, for Calvin and Hobbes
- 1994: Harvey Award, Best Syndicated Comic Strip, for Calvin and Hobbes
- 1995: Harvey Award, Best Syndicated Comic Strip, for Calvin and Hobbes
- 1996: Harvey Award, Best Syndicated Comic Strip, for Calvin and Hobbes
- 2014: Grand Prix, Angoulême International Comics Festival
- 2020: Inducted into the Will Eisner Award Hall of Fame

== Bibliography ==
- 1987: Calvin and Hobbes
- 1988: Something Under the Bed is Drooling
- 1988: Yukon Ho!
- 1990: Weirdos from Another Planet
- 1991: The Revenge of the Baby-Sat
- 1991: Scientific Progress Goes "Boink"
- 1992: Attack of the Deranged Mutant Killer Monster Snow Goons
- 1993: The Days are Just Packed
- 1994: Homicidal Psycho Jungle Cat: A Calvin and Hobbes Collection
- 1995: The Calvin and Hobbes Tenth Anniversary Book
- 1996: There's Treasure Everywhere
- 1996: It's a Magical World
  - 2015: Exploring Calvin and Hobbes: An Exhibition Catalogue
- 2023: The Mysteries

Treasury collections

- 1988: The Essential Calvin and Hobbes: A Calvin and Hobbes Treasury
- 1989: The Lazy Sunday Book
- 1990: The Authoritative Calvin and Hobbes
- 1992: The Indispensable Calvin and Hobbes
- 2002: Calvin and Hobbes Sunday Pages 1985–1995
- 2005: The Complete Calvin and Hobbes
- 2019: The Complete Calvin and Hobbes (reprint)
