= Comix Fair =

Comic convention in Houston, Texas, US

- Status: Defunct
- Genre: Comic books
- Venue: Ramada Hotel Southwest (1988–1989); Holiday Inn—Medical Center (1990–1991); Medallion Hotel (1996)
- Locations: Houston, Texas
- Country: United States
- Inaugurated: 1983
- Most recent: 1996
- Organizer: Utopia Entertainment
- Filing status: For-profit

Comix Fair was a comic convention that was held annually between 1983 and 1996 in Houston, Texas. It was produced by the Houston-based company Utopia Entertainment.

Comix Fairs usually took place over two days in the summer, from Saturday to Sunday. The convention featured a large range of pop culture elements, primarily comic books and toys, but also television serials, science fiction/fantasy, film/television, animation, and horror. Along with panels, seminars, and workshops with comic book professionals, the convention featured a large floorspace for exhibitors, including comic book dealers and collectibles merchants. The show included an autograph area, as well as an Artists' Alley where comics artists signed autographs and drew sketches. Tank McNamara creators Jeff Millar and Bill Hinds, both based in the Houston area, were occasional guests of the show.

== History ==
Comix Fair followed but was unaffiliated with Houstoncon, a large multi-genre convention which took place annually in Houston from 1967–1982. The final Houstoncon, billed as "Ultimate Fantasy," was a fiasco; Comix Fair was much smaller in scale and, unlike Houstoncon, returned its focus primarily to comic books.

The first Comix Fair was held in the summer of 1983, from July 29 to 31, at the Ramada Hotel West, following Utopia's Planetcon at the Marriott Brookhollow in October 1982. An impressive guest lineup included media personalities Terrence Dicks and Bill Mumy, and comics creators Jim Shooter, Steve Englehart, Chris Claremont, Paul Smith, Kerry Gammill, Ernie Chan, Josef Rubinstein, Sam De La Rosa, Dick Giordano, Sal Amendola, Marv Wolfman, Len Wein, Mike W. Barr, P. Craig Russell, Rick Obadiah, Mike Grell, Mark Wheatley & Marc Hempel, Dave & Deni Sim, Cat Yronwode, Dean Mullaney, Max Allan Collins, Terry Beatty, John Carbonaro, Jaxon, Jeff Millar & Bill Hinds, and Jerry Bittle. The convention program featured the T.H.U.N.D.E.R. Agents characters NoMan and Dynamo (the most recent appearance of the T.H.U.N.D.E.R. Agents had been published by Texas Comics).

Dave Stevens was a guest of the 1984 edition of the Comix Fair.

The fourth annual Comix Fair was held August 22–23, 1986, at the Brookhollow Marriott. Official guests included Gary Groth, Gil Kane, Joe Pumilia, Jeff Millar, Bill Hinds, and Doug Potter.

Comix Fair VI was held June 24–26, 1988, at the Ramada Hotel Southwest. Featured guests were Sergio Aragonés, Kim DeMulder, Mike Leeke, and William Messner-Loebs.

The seventh annual Comix Fair took place June 16–17, 1989, at the Ramada Hotel Southwest. Guests included John Romita, Jr., Bob Layton, Tim Vigil, and Doug Hazlewood.

Comix Fair VIII was held August 4–5, 1990, at the Holiday Inn—Medical Center; guests were Bill Hinds, Jeff Millar, and Doug Hazlewood.

The 1991 Comix Fair expanded to three days, taking place June 21–23 at the Holiday Inn—Medical Center. Guests included Russ Heath, Nestor Redondo, Jeff Millar, Bill Hinds, and Rick Klaw.

The fourteenth and final show, officially known as the "Houston Comix Fair & Toy Show," was held June 2, 1996, at the Medallion Hotel. Guests included Mart Nodell and Shannon Wheeler. LepreCon was used as the name for Utopia's annual March shows.

By this time, Comix Fair promoter Utopia Entertainment was putting on one-day small-scale shows in the Houston area on a bimonthly basis. Guests at some of these shows included Doug Hazlewood, Kenneth Smith, Gil Kane, Jimmy Palmiotti, Amanda Conner, Mike Grell, Mike Wieringo, Jeff Parker, Brian Stelfreeze, Susie Owens, Bjo Trimble, Mark Allen Shepherd, Len Wein, Marv Wolfman, Jerry Bingham, Mark Schultz, William Stout, Sean Stewart, Marilyn Burns, and Edwin Neal.

A 15th Comix Fair was planned for June 22, 1997, at the Holiday Inn Select, but the promoter (Larry Taylor), who was born with Marfan syndrome, had to have a second, unexpected heart surgery as a result of that condition, and did not resume organizing conventions. After a subsequent writing career, he died in Seattle in 2014 of amyotrophic lateral sclerosis (ALS).

== Legacy ==
After many years of Comix Fair being the only comic convention in Houston, on August 7–8, 1993, the University of Houston hosted the "Houston Comic Book Festival," with official guests Chris Claremont, Matt Wagner, Kelley Jones, Joe St. Pierre, Evan Dorkin, and Mike Leeke.

After Comix Fair's demise in 1996, Houston was devoid of comic conventions until the mid-2000s, when Comicpalooza entered the scene. Since then, the number of Houston-area conventions has exploded, with shows like the Houston Comic Con, Amazing Houston Comic Con, and Space City Comic Con all taking place in the city.
