= 1983 in comics =

Notable events of 1983 in comics.

== Events and publications ==
- Kevin Eastman and Peter Laird found Mirage Studios, which is headquartered at Northampton, Massachusetts.
- Chicago-based First Comics makes a strong entry into the publishing field, putting out four ongoing titles, American Flagg!, E-Man, Jon Sable Freelance, and Warp!; featuring the talents of such established creators as Howard Chaykin, Mike Grell, Frank Brunner, and Joe Staton.
- DC Comics acquires most of Charlton Comics' "Action Hero" superhero characters — including Blue Beetle, Captain Atom, and the Question — from the failing publisher.
- Long-time comics publisher Warren Publishing declares bankruptcy.
- The publicly traded Archie Comics is acquired by Richard Goldwater (son of Archie co-founder John L. Goldwater) and Michael Silberkleit, returning the publisher to private ownership.
- Noble Comics, original publisher of Justice Machine, ceases publication. Texas Comics picks up the title, publishing the Justice Machine Annual, featuring the first appearance of Bill Willingham's Elementals, as well as a crossover between the Justice Machine and the T.H.U.N.D.E.R. Agents. After Texas folds later the same year, Comico takes over both Justice Machine and Elementals.

=== January ===
- January 2: La Dernière Carte, by Jean Michel Charlier and Jean Giraud, the first album of the saga The rehabilitation of Blueberry.
- January 14: The first episode of Gilles de Geus by Hanco Kolk and Peter de Wit is published in Eppo.
- The first volume of the Official Handbook of the Marvel Universe is published
- Debut of the western series Kerry il trapper, written by Tiziano Sclavi, published in appendix to Comandante Mark (Sergio Bonelli).
- In the Italian erotic magazine Playmen, first chapter of Milo Manara's Click.
- Ramor's conch, by Serge Le Tendre and Regis Loisel, first album of the saga La Quête de l'oiseau du temps.
- 300 à l'heure dans Paris by Jean Graton.
- The Lucky Luke album Daisy Town by Goscinny and Morris is released.
- The first episode of Ram Waeerkar's comic series Suppandi is published.

=== February ===
- Wonder Woman #300: Special anniversary issue written by Roy Thomas, Danette Thomas, and Dan Mishkin (consultant). (DC Comics)
- Bizarre Adventures (Marvel Comics) publishes its final issue, #34.
- The Buyer's Guide to Comics Fandom is acquired by Krause Publications and changes its name to Comics Buyer's Guide.
- The Thorgal story La chute de Brek Zarith by Jean Van Hamme and Grzegorz Rosiński.

=== March ===
- March 16: Queen Fabiola of Belgium pays an official visit to Willy Vandersteen's studio.
- March 20: In the Disney comics magazine Topolino, the first episode of Messer Papero, by Guido Martina and Giovan Battista Carpi is serialized, a saga in 7 episodes, starring Donald Duck and Uncle Scrooge, living in the medieval Florence.
- March 22: The newspaper comic Philippe Geluck's Le Chat makes its debut in Le Soir. It will run for 30 years.
- David Anthony Kraft publishes the first issue of his long-running magazine Comics Interview.
- Archie Comics revives its Red Circle Comics superhero imprint with Mighty Crusaders #1.
- Billy the Kid (1957 series), with issue #153, canceled by Charlton.
- In RAW, the horror comic Big Baby by Charles Burns makes its debut.

=== April ===
- The Legion of Super-Heroes vol. 2 #298 features an insert previewing the upcoming Amethyst, Princess of Gemworld series by writers Dan Mishkin and Gary Cohn and artist Ernie Colón.
- After releasing its final issue, nr. 94, Crazy Magazine is cancelled.
- In Epic illustrated, The chess game, by Archie Goodwin and Pepe Moreno, first chapter of the sci-fi series Generation Zero, set after the Third World War.
- In the Spanish magazine Metropol, Polux, spy story by Manfred Sommer.
- First issue of the annual magazine Trumoon, published by a collective of cartoonists in Salerno.
- The Alix story L'Empereur de Chine by Jacques Martin is published.

=== May ===
- May 27: The first issue of the short-lived magazine Full (Sergio Bonelli) is published. It will last until December.
- Jason Todd makes his debut as the second Robin in Detective Comics #526.
- In Glamour international magazine, Little Ego, by Vittorio Giardino makes his debut.

=== June ===
- June 1: in Pilote, first chapter of The ghosts of Inverloch, by Pierre Christin and Jean-Claude Mézières.
- June 7: The first episode of Cosey's À La Recherche de Peter Pan (On the Search for Peter Pan) is serialized in Tintin.
- June 25: Jack Edward Oliver's Cliff Hanger debuts in Buster.
- Action Comics #544: 68-page anniversary issue; origins of revamped Lex Luthor (by Cary Bates and Curt Swan) and Brainiac (by Marv Wolfman and Gil Kane).
- Adventure Comics #500: 148-page giant, reprints of "Tales of the Legion of Super-Heroes" from issues #305–313, mostly written by Edmond Hamilton (who had died in 1977).
- Legion of Super-Heroes #300: 68-page anniversary issue; the cover features the Legionnaires drawn by over twenty separate artists.
- With issue #124, DC publishes the final issue of its supernatural war comic Weird War Tales.
- Master of Kung Fu, with issue #125, is cancelled by Marvel.
- Marvel Two-in-One, with issue #100, is cancelled by Marvel (replaced the following month by the new title The Thing).
- In the Italian magazine Orient express, L'Intervista by Gino D’Antonio is published, the epilogue of the saga Storia del West.
- The Ric Hochet story La fleche de sang by André-Paul Duchâteau and Tibet is published.
- Les murailles de Samaris by François Schuiten and Benoît Peeters is published.

=== July ===
- July 13: The first episode of the Lucky Luke story Fingers is prepublished in the magazine VSD, which marks the first time Luke is drawn with a straw, rather than a cigarette.
- First issue of Frank Miller's Ronin limited series published by DC Comics.
- With issue #200, DC publishes the final issue of The Brave and the Bold, which also features a preview insert for the new title Batman and the Outsiders.
- Last album of Akim; the Italian version of Tarzan closes his cycle after 33 years of editorial life.

=== August ===
- August 20: In 2000 AD, TheTtime mMnster, by Pat Mills and Angie Kincaid is published, marking the debut of Slaine.
- Alan Moore's "The Bojeffries Saga" starts with "The Rentman Cometh," in Warrior #12, published by Quality Communications (continued through 1986).
- Harris Publications acquires bankrupt publisher Warren Publishing's company assets at auction.
- La Ccittà delle Ombre Diafane (City of Pale Shadows) by Alfredo Castelli and Giancarlo Alessandrini is published, important antecedents of the Martin Mystère series are revealed (the first meeting between Martin and Java, the reasons of the villain Orlof's mutilations).
- The Thorgal story Au-delà des ombres by Jean Van Hamme and Grzegorz Rosiński is published.

=== September ===
- September 1: In the Italian Disney magazine Topolino, the Mickey Mouse story Topolino e la regina d’Africa, by Romano Scarpa marks the debut of the African princess Zenobia, who'll become Goofy’s girlfriend.
- September 11: The final episode of the newspaper comic Priscilla's Pop is published (originally created by Al Vermeer).
- September 29: The first episode of Raoul Cauvin and Marc Hardy's Pierre Tombal is published in Spirou.
- With issue #503, DC ceases publishing Adventure Comics, which had been running continuously since November 1938.
- First issue of Storie blu special (Ediperiodici), an Italian horror and erotic comics magazine.

=== October ===
- October 1: The final episode of Pil's long-running comic series Meneerke Peeters is published.
- House of Mystery, with issue #321, canceled by DC.
- The Comet — #1 of a planned six-issue limited series, published by Red Circle Comics.
- The Black Hood, with issue #3, is cancelled by Red Circle.
- First issue of Corto Maltese (Rizzoli), Italian magazine of author comics; the first number includes a version of Bram Stoker’s Dracula by Guido Crepax and Tutto cominciò con un’estate Indiana (All began in an Indian summer), by Hugo Pratt and Milo Manara, set in the colonial New England.
- Star Wars: Return of the Jedi by Archie Goodwin, Al Wiliamson and Carlos Garzon.
- The Astérix story Asterix and son is published, by Albert Uderzo.
- The Buddy Longway story Capitaine Ryan by Derib is published.
- The Ric Hochet story Le Malefice Vaodou is published, by André-Paul Duchâteau and Tibet .

=== November ===
- Walt Simonson makes his debut as writer/artist on Thor with issue #337 and introduces the character Beta Ray Bill.
- The Daredevils, with issue #11, is merged with The Mighty World of Marvel (Marvel UK).
- Pertini by Andrea Pazienza (Primo Carnera editore), an ironic and affectionate homage to the Italian president.

=== December ===
- December 15: The first episode of Washington "Tonton" Young's Pupung appears in print.
- First issue of Marvel's Magik (Storm and Illyana Limited Series), written by Chris Claremont.
- Lancelot Strong: The Shield, with issue #3, is re-titled Shield—Steel Sterling. (Red Circle Comics)
- The Comet, a planned six-issue limited series, is cancelled with issue #2 by Red Circle Comics.
- First issue of the Lupo Alberto story Il mensile di Lupo Alberto (Editoriale Corno) is published
- Sur l'etoile by Moebius is published, originally as a simple promotional album for Citroen. It later becomes the first chapter of the saga Le Monde d'Edena.

=== Specific date unknown ===
- Peter van Straaten wins the Stripschapprijs. The Jaarprijs voor Bijzondere Verdiensten (nowadays the P. Hans Frankfurtherprijs) is given to Maarten de Meulder, the editorial board of Donald Duck and Betty Sluyzer, Cees Taheij and Fred Marschall for their book Stripwerk.
- The official Rupert the Bear fanclub, The Followers of Rupert, is founded.
- In L. A. Reader, the first episode of The Angriest Dog in the World, by film director David Lynch is published. It will run until 1992.
- The first strip of the series DTWOF (Dykes to Watch Out For ) by Alison Bechdel is published.
- In Don, la revista para Juan, the sci-fi series Husmeante, by Carlos Trillo and Domingo Roberto Mandrafina debuts.
- François Rivière and Francis Carin publish the first episode of their historical adventure comic series Victor Sackville.
- Albert Uderzo successfully sues a German translation of Roger Brunel's pornographic parody series Pastiches, because of a porn parody of his series Astérix. All titles are confiscated.
- Little Archie, published since 1956, is discontinued.

== Deaths ==
=== January ===
- January 3: Doug Wright, British-Canadian illustrator, cartoonist and comics artist (Doug Wright's Family, aka Nipper, continued Birdseye Center as Juniper Junction), dies at age 65.
- January 9: Merrill Blosser, American comics artist (Freckles and His Friends), dies at age 90.
- January 17: Doodles Weaver, American actor, comedian, musician and comics writer (Mad Magazine), commits suicide at age 71.
- January 19: Willy Kuyper, Dutch comics artist and illustrator (Tobis Sloom en Blinkie, Valentijn de Veroveraar, De Kapitein van den Geheimen Dienst, Ted Bolt), dies at age 54.
- January 28: Frank Chiaramonte, Cuban-American comics artist and inker (DC Comics, Marvel Comics), dies at age 40.

=== February ===
- February 10: Wally Robertson, Scottish comics artist (Funny Wonder), dies at age 80.
- February 24: Roy Krenkel, American illustrator and comics artist (EC Comics), dies at age 64.
- February 28: Ira Yarbrough, American comics artist (worked on Superman), dies at age 72.

=== March ===
- March 1: Val Heinz, American comics artist (Dawn O'Day, assisted on Gasoline Alley), dies at age 75.
- March 3: Hergé, Belgian writer and comics artist (Totor, The Adventures of Tintin, Quick & Flupke, Popol Out West, and Jo, Zette and Jocko), chief editor (Le Petit Vingtième, Tintin) and studio founder (Studio Hergé), dies at age 75.
- March 5: Ruggero Giovannini, Italian comics artist (Olac the Gladiator, Wulf the Briton), dies at age 60.
- March 16: Rick Fletcher, American comic artist (assisted on/continued Dick Tracy), dies at age 66.
- March 19: Harry Nielsen, Danish comics artist (Willy på Eventyr, Bamse og Dukke Lise), dies at age 87.
- March 23: Wolfgang Hicks, German cartoonist and caricaturist, dies at age 73.

=== April ===
- April 6: Christopher Rule, American comics inker (Marvel Comics, Atlas Comics), dies at age 88.
- April 29: Alfred Andriola, American comics artist (Kerry Drake, It's Me, Dilly assisted on Terry and the Pirates, Scorchy Smith and Dan Dunn), dies at age 70.

=== May ===
- May 13: Lucie Lundberg, Swedish illustrator and comics artist (Pelle Svanslös), dies at age 74.
- May 23: Jen Trubert, French comics artist (Chevalier Printemps, continued Bécassine), dies at age 74.
- May 25: Cy Hungerford, American comics artist (Snoodles), dies at age 93.
- May 28: André Durst, French painter, illustrator, musician and comic artist, A.K.A. Durane (Gnouf, Dydo), dies at age 88.
- Specific date in May unknown: Kho Wang Gie, Indonesian comics artist (Put On, Nona A Go Go, Si Lemot, Agen Rahasia Bolong Jilu), dies at age 74 or 75.

=== June ===
- June 8: Jacques Van Melkebeke, Belgian comics artist (Baron du Crac), comics writer (The Adventures of Tintin, Blake and Mortimer, Corentin, Hassan et Kadour), journalist, painter, art critic and first chief editor of Tintin magazine (1946), dies at age 78.
- June 25: Celmar Poumé, Uruguayan comics artist and sports journalist (Tom Steele, el Justiciero Texas, Peter Colt, Cab Kennedy, Oceanic Rey del Mar, Les Travesuras del Eduardito, Kar-Thoun, el Hombre Universal, Pamela y su Parentella), dies at age 59.

=== July ===
- July: Jack Greenall, British comics artist (Useless Eunice), dies at age 78.
- July 18: George Lichty, American comics artist (Grin and Bear It), dies of a heart attack at age 78.
- July 22: Jack Rickard, American illustrator and comics artist (Mad Magazine, assisted on Li'l Abner and Pauline McPeril), dies at age 61.
- July 31: Mark Lasky, American comics artist (continued Nancy), dies from cancer at age 29.

=== August ===
- August 11: Jostein Øvrelid, Norwegian comic artist (Ingeniør Knut Berg på eventyr), dies at age 72.
- August 15: Al Kilgore, American comics artist (Rocky & Bullwinkle comic strip), dies at age 55 from an embolism.
- August 29: Rory Hayes, American underground cartoonist (Bogeyman), dies from a drug overdose at age 34.

=== September ===
- September 5: Lloyd Piper, Australian comics artist (continued Ginger Meggs), dies at age 59.
- September 14: Laure Hovine, Belgian comics writer (Nic et Nac), dies at age 87.
- September 27: Wong Sze-ma, AKA Wong Wing-hing, Chinese comic artist (Father and Ms., Ngau-chai, Gorgeous Susan, Debussy), dies at age 42 or 43.

=== October ===
- October 4: Dino Battaglia, Italian comics artist (Mark Fury, Till Eulenspiegel, L'Ispettore), dies age 60.
- October 13: Eric Eden, British comic writer and artist (worked on Dan Dare and comics based on Thunderbirds), dies at age 58.
- October 23: Helge Hall Jensen, Danish comics artist (Hilarius Petersens Radiooplevelser Bulder og Bum + Minus, Storebroer og Lillebror, Kjukken i Fritiden, Hans og Grete, Nullerten), dies at age 76.

=== November ===
- November 5: Jean-Marc Reiser, French comics writer, artist and cartoonist (Jeanine, Grosse Déguelasse, published in Hara-Kiri, Charlie Hebdo), dies of bone cancer at age 42.
- November 7: Hanns Erich Köhler, aka Erik, German caricaturist, illustrator and comics artist (Tipp und Tapp), dies at age 78.
- November 13: Douwe Sikkema, Dutch illustrator and comics artist (De Avonturen van Van Bergen), dies at age 84.
- November 18: Loÿs Pétillot, French illustrator and comics artist (Bob et Bobette, Pascal et Michèle Montfort), dies at age 72.

=== December ===
- December 30: Libico Maraja, Italian illustrator, animator and comics artist (made comics for the magazine Topolino), dies at age 71.

=== Specific date unknown ===
- Gustav Bergström, Swedish comics artist (Brainy Bill, Thomas Whiskey, Strömberg), dies at age 83 or 84.
- Hector Brault, aka Tom Lucas, Canadian comics artist (Casimir, Tom Brinfin et Dodolf), dies at age 75.
- Fred Julsing Sr., Dutch comics artist (De Helse Patrouille), dies at age 74 or 75.
- Shigeo Mayo, Japanese woodblock artist and caricaturist (Kushisuke Manyuki (The Adventures of Dango Kushisuke), Manga Taro, Karutobi Karusuke), dies at age 81.
- Nora Schnitzler, Dutch comics artist, painter and illustrator (Keesje Knabbel), dies at age 81 or 82.

== Exhibitions and shows ==
- June 2–October 2: Penny Dreadfuls and Comics: English Periodicals for Children from Victorian Times to the Present Day (Bethnal Green Museum of Childhood, Victoria & Albert Museum, London, UK) — loan exhibition from the Library of Oldenburg University, West Germany
- July 19–August 26: The Comic Art Show: Cartoons and Paintings from Winsor McCay and Stuart Davis through R. Crumb and Keith Haring (Whitney Museum of American Art, Downtown, New York City) — curated by John Carlin and Sheena Wagstaff; artists also include Alfred Jarry, Stuart Davis, Jasper Johns, Andy Warhol, Roy Lichtenstein, Claes Oldenburg, Lyonel Feininger, and Art Spiegelman
- September 26–November 4: "Active cartoonists" (Ohio State University Main Library; Columbus, Ohio) — work by members of the National Cartoonists Society and the Association of American Editorial Cartoonists; part of the inaugural Festival of Cartoon Art
- October 10–October 31: "Comic art prints" (Public Library of Columbus; Columbus, Ohio) — display of limited-edition set of 20 prints owned by the OSU Library for Communication and Graphic Arts; part of the inaugural Festival of Cartoon Art
- October 13–November 4: "Historic cartoons" (Hoyt Sherman Gallery; Columbus, Ohio) — from the collections of Philip Sills and Frank Pauer, the Columbus Museum of Art, and the Ohio Historical Society; part of the inaugural Festival of Cartoon Art

== Conventions ==
- January 28–30: Angoulême International Comics Festival (Angoulême, France) — 10th annual festival
- Summer: FantaCon (Albany, New York) — show returns after a one-year hiatus; guests include James Doohan
- June: Heroes Convention (Charlotte, North Carolina)
- June 25–26: Colorado Comic Art Convention (Rocky Mountain School of Art, Denver, Colorado) — official guests include Phil Normand, Marshall Rogers, Larry Mahlstedt, Ron Wilson, Gil Kane, and Edward Bryant
- July 2–4: Comic Art Convention (as "International Science Fiction and Comic Art Convention") (Sheraton Hotel, New York City) — final iteration of this long-running show; guests include Philip José Farmer; presentation of the Saturn Awards
- July 22–24: Chicago Comicon (American-Congress Hotel, Chicago, Illinois)
- July 29–31: Comix Fair 83 (Ramada Hotel West, Houston, Texas) — first annual show; guests include Terrance Dicks, Bill Mumy, Jim Shooter, Steve Englehart, Chris Claremont, Paul Smith, Kerry Gammill, Ernie Chan, Josef Rubinstein, Sam De La Rosa, Dick Giordano, Sal Amendola, Marv Wolfman, Len Wein, Mike W. Barr, P. Craig Russell, Rick Obadiah, Mike Grell, Mark Wheatley & Marc Hempel, Dave & Deni Sim, Cat Yronwode, Dean Mullaney, Max Allan Collins, Terry Beatty, John Carbonaro, Jaxon, Jeff Millar & Bill Hinds, and Jerry Bittle
- August 4–7: San Diego Comic-Con (Convention and Performing Arts Center and Hotel San Diego, California) — 5,000 attendees; official guests: Douglas Adams, Bob Clampett, Floyd Gottfredson, Harvey Kurtzman, Norman Maurer, Grim Natwick, George Pérez, Trina Robbins
- August 5–7: Atlanta Fantasy Fair (Omni Hotel and Georgia World Congress Center, Atlanta, Georgia) — guests include Chuck Jones, Theodore Sturgeon, Chris Claremont, Wendy & Richard Pini, Forrest Ackerman, Mike Grell, Ted White, and Bob MacLeod; admission to the show: $19 at the door
- September: OrlandoCon (Orlando, Florida) — guests include Harvey Kurtzman, Wayne Boring, Will Eisner, C. C. Beck, Joe Kubert, Don Wright, Ralph Kent, Morris Weiss, Dik Browne, and Dean Young
- October 14: Festival of Cartoon Art (Ohio State University, Columbus, Ohio) — guest speakers include Mike Peters, Mort Walker, Bill Yates, Tony Auth, Tom Batiuk, Milton Caniff, Luke Feck, Jules Feiffer, Cathy Guisewite, Irwin Hasen, Draper Hill, Etta Hulme, Bil Keane, Fred Lasswell, Toni Mendez, Kate Palmer, and Art Sansom
- October 15: London Comic Mart (Central Hall, Westminster, England) — presentation of the Eagle Awards by Alan Moore and Dave Gibbons
- November: Mid-Ohio Con (Ohio) — guests include David Prowse
- November 25–27: Fantasy Festival (Sheraton Park Central, Dallas, Texas) — guests include Roger Zelazny, Alan Dean Foster, George R.R. Martin, and Howard Waldrop

== Awards ==
- Ronald Michaud receives the Advertising and Illustration Award from the National Cartoonist Society.

=== Eagle Awards ===
Presented in 1984 for comics published in 1983:

- Best Story: V for Vendetta, by Alan Moore and David Lloyd (Warrior, Quality Communications)
- Best Graphic Novel: Nemesis the Warlock, by Bryan Talbot
- Favourite Group Book: The New Teen Titans (DC Comics)
- Favourite Group or Team: The X-Men
- Favourite Character: Torquemada, from Nemesis the Warlock, by Brian Talbot
- Favourite Comics Writer: Alan Moore, "V for Vendetta", Warrior (Quality Communications)
- Favourite Artist: Bill Sienkiewicz
- Favourite Inker: Terry Austin
- Favourite Single or Continued Story (UK): "Marvelman" in Warrior #1–3 & 5–6, by Alan Moore and Garry Leach
- Best UK Title: Warrior, edited by Dez Skinn (Quality Communications)
- Best New Title (UK): The Daredevils, edited by Bernie Jaye (Marvel UK)
- Favourite Artist (UK): Alan Davis
- Roll of Honour: Will Eisner

== First issues by title ==
=== Archie Comics ===
The Black Hood

Release: June by Red Circle Comics. Editor: Rich Buckler.

Blue Ribbon Comics

Release: November by Red Circle Comics. Editor: Robin Snyder.

The Fly

Release: May by Red Circle Comics. Editor: Rich Buckler.

Lancelot Strong: The Shield

Release: June by Red Circle Comics. Editor: Rich Buckler.

Mighty Crusaders vol. 2

Release: March by Red Circle Comics. Editor: Rich Buckler.

=== DC Comics ===
Batman and The Outsiders

Release: July. Writer: Mike W. Barr. Artist: Jim Aparo.

DC Graphic Novels: Star Raiders

Release: August. Writer: Elliot S! Maggin. Artist: José Luis García-López.

Omega Men

Release: April. Writer: Roger Slifer. Artist: Keith Giffen.

Thriller

Release: November. Writer: Robert Loren Fleming. Artist: Trevor Von Eeden.

=== First Comics ===
American Flagg!

Release: October. Writer/Artist: Howard Chaykin.

E-Man

Release: April. Writer: Martin Pasko. Artist: Joe Staton.

Jon Sable Freelance

Release: June. Writer/Artist: Mike Grell.

Warp!

Release: March. Editor: Mike Gold.

=== Marvel Comics ===
Alpha Flight

Release: August. Writer/Artist: John Byrne.

The Daredevils

Release: January by Marvel UK. Editor: Bernie Jaye.

Marvel Age

Release: April. Editors: Peter David and Carol Kalish.

New Mutants

Release: March. Writer: Chris Claremont. Artists: Bob McLeod and Mike Gustovich.

The Thing

Release: July. Writer: John Byrne. Artists: Ron Wilson and Joe Sinnott.

=== Independent titles ===
Albedo Anthropomorphics
Release: Thoughts & Images. Writers/Artists: Steve Gallacci, et al.

Badger
Release: July by Capital Comics. Writer: Mike Baron. Artist: Jeff Butler.

Biebel
Release: by Standaard Uitgeverij. Writer and artist: Marc Legendre.

A Distant Soil
Release: December by WaRP Graphics. Writers/Artists: Colleen Doran.

Eclipse Monthly
Release: August by Eclipse Comics. Editors: Cat Yronwode and Dean Mullaney.

Les Cités Obscures
Les murailles de Samaris
Release: Casterman. Writer: Benoît Peeters. Artist: François Schuiten.

Nexus
Release: May by Capital Comics. Writer: Mike Baron. Artist: Steve Rude.

Skateman
Release: November by Pacific Comics. Writer/Artist: Neal Adams.

== Initial appearances by character name ==
=== DC Comics ===
- Adeline Kane in New Teen Titans #34 (August)
- Alexander Luthor Jr. in Action Comics #544 (June)
- Amazing-Man in All-Star Squadron #23 (July)
- Amethyst, Princess of Gemworld in Legion of Super-Heroes #298 (April)
- Atom Smasher in All-Star Squadron #25 (September)
- Atomic Knight in DC Comics Presents #57 (May)
- Cheshire in New Teen Titans Annual #2 (August)
- Comet Queen in Legion of Super-Heroes #304 (October)
- Crescent Moon in World's Finest #295 (September)
- Deathbolt in All-Star Squadron #21 (May)
- Doc in Omega Men #3 (June)
- Felicity in Omega Men #4 (July)
- Hippolyta Trevor in Wonder Woman #300 (February)
- Geo-Force in Brave and the Bold #200 (July)
- Green Man in Green Lantern #164 (May)
- Halo in Brave and the Bold #200 (July)
- Harbinger in New Teen Titans Annual #2 (July)
- Hector Hall in All-Star Squadron #25 (September)
- Henry King Jr. in All-Star Squadron #24 (August)
- Jade in All-Star Squadron #25 (September)
- Jason Todd in Batman #357 (March)
- Katana in Brave and the Bold #200 (July)
- Killer Croc in Detective Comics #523 (February)
- Little Cheese in Captain Carrot and His Amazing Zoo Crew #12 (February)
- Lobo in Omega Men #3 (June)
- New Moon in World's Finest #295 (September)
- Nightslayer in Detective Comics #529 (August)
- Nocturna in Detective Comics #529 (August)
- Northwind in All-Star Squadron #25 (September)
- Obsidian in All-Star Squadron #25 (September)
- Protector in New Teen Titans Drug Awareness Special (1983)
- Reactron in Supergirl #8 (June)
- Shlagen in Omega Men #3 (June)
- Sunburst in Superboy #45 (September)
- Thunder and Lightning in New Teen Titans #32
- Tokamak in Firestorm #15 (August)
- Trident in New Teen Titans #33 (July)
- Vigilante (Adrian Chase) in New Teen Titans Annual #2

=== Marvel Comics ===
- Beta Ray Bill in Thor #337
- Box in Alpha Flight #1
- Cypher in New Mutants #13
- Diamond Lil in Alpha Flight #1
- Hobgoblin in The Amazing Spider-Man #238
- Lord Dark Wind in Daredevil #196
- Magma in New Mutants #8
- Meggan in The Mighty World of Marvel #7, published by Marvel UK
- Morlocks in Uncanny X-Men #169
  - Callisto
  - Masque
  - Sunder
- Yuriko Oyama in Daredevil #197
- Madelyne Pryor in Uncanny X-Men #168
- Puck in Alpha Flight #1
- Selene in New Mutants #9
- Marrina Smallwood in Alpha Flight #1
- Talisman in Alpha Flight #5
- Kate Waynesboro in The Incredible Hulk #287
- White Rabbit in Marvel Team-Up #131
- Wild Child in Alpha Flight #1

=== Independent titles ===
- Big Ben in Warrior #9 (January, by Quality Communications)
- Dragonfly in Americomics #4 (October, by AC Comics)
- Grimjack in Starslayer #10 (November, by Pacific Comics)
- Stardust in Bill Black's Fun Comics #4 (March, by AC Comics)
- Miyamoto Usagi in Albedo Anthropomorphics #2 (Thoughts and Images)
