= Cartoon =

Type of two-dimensional visual art

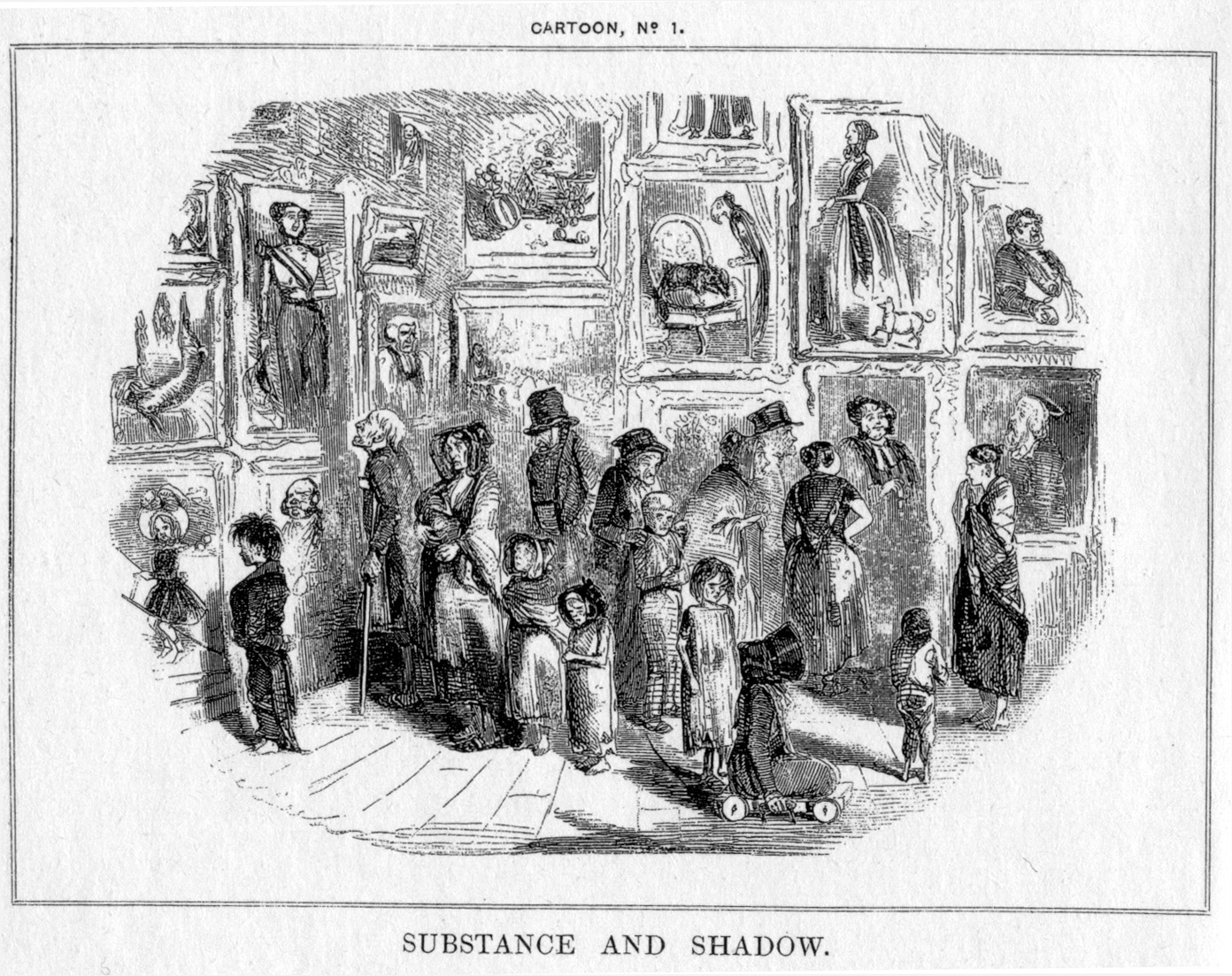
John Leech, Substance and Shadow (1843), published as Cartoon, No. 1 in Punch, the first use of the word cartoon to refer to a satirical drawing

A cartoon is a type of visual art that is typically drawn, frequently animated, in an unrealistic or semi-realistic style. The specific meaning has evolved, but the modern usage usually refers to either: an image or series of images intended for satire, caricature, or humor; or a motion picture that relies on a sequence of illustrations for its animation. Someone who creates cartoons in the first sense is called a cartoonist, and in the second sense they are usually called an animator.

This article covers "static" cartoons; for moving ones see animation.

The concept originated in the Middle Ages, and first described a preparatory drawing for a piece of art, such as a painting, fresco, tapestry, or stained glass window. In the 19th century, beginning in Punch magazine in 1843, cartoon came to refer – ironically at first – to humorous artworks in magazines and newspapers. Then it also was used for political cartoons and comic strips. When the medium developed, in the early 20th century, it began to refer to animated films that resembled print cartoons.

== Fine art ==
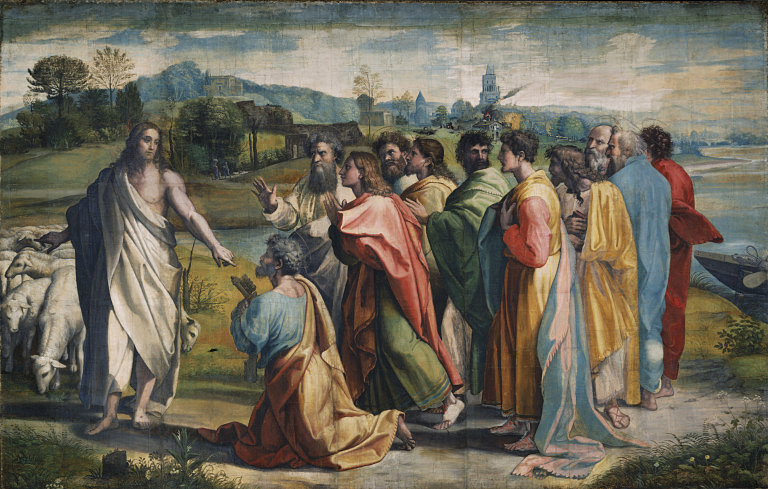
Christ's Charge to Peter, one of the Raphael Cartoons, c. 1516, a full-size cartoon design for a tapestry

In fine art, a cartoon (from Italian: cartone and Dutch: karton—words describing strong, heavy paper or pasteboard and cognates for carton) is a full-size drawing made on sturdy paper as a design or modello for a painting, stained glass, or tapestry. Cartoons were typically used in the production of frescoes, to accurately link the component parts of the composition when painted on damp plaster over a series of days (giornate). In media such as stained tapestry or stained glass, the cartoon was handed over by the artist to the skilled craftsmen who produced the final work.

Such cartoons often have pinpricks along the outlines of the design so that a bag of soot patted or "pounced" over a cartoon, held against the wall, would leave black dots on the plaster ("pouncing"). Cartoons by painters, such as the Raphael Cartoons in London, Francisco Goya's tapestry cartoons, and examples by Leonardo da Vinci, are highly prized in their own right. Tapestry cartoons, usually colored, could be placed behind the loom, where the weaver would replicate the design. As tapestries are worked from behind, a mirror could be placed behind the loom to allow the weaver to see their work; in such cases the cartoon was placed behind the weaver.

== Mass media ==
In print media, a cartoon is a drawing or series of drawings, usually humorous in intent. This usage dates from 1843, when Punch magazine applied the term to satirical drawings in its pages, particularly sketches by John Leech. The first of these parodied the preparatory cartoons for grand historical frescoes in the then-new Palace of Westminster in London.

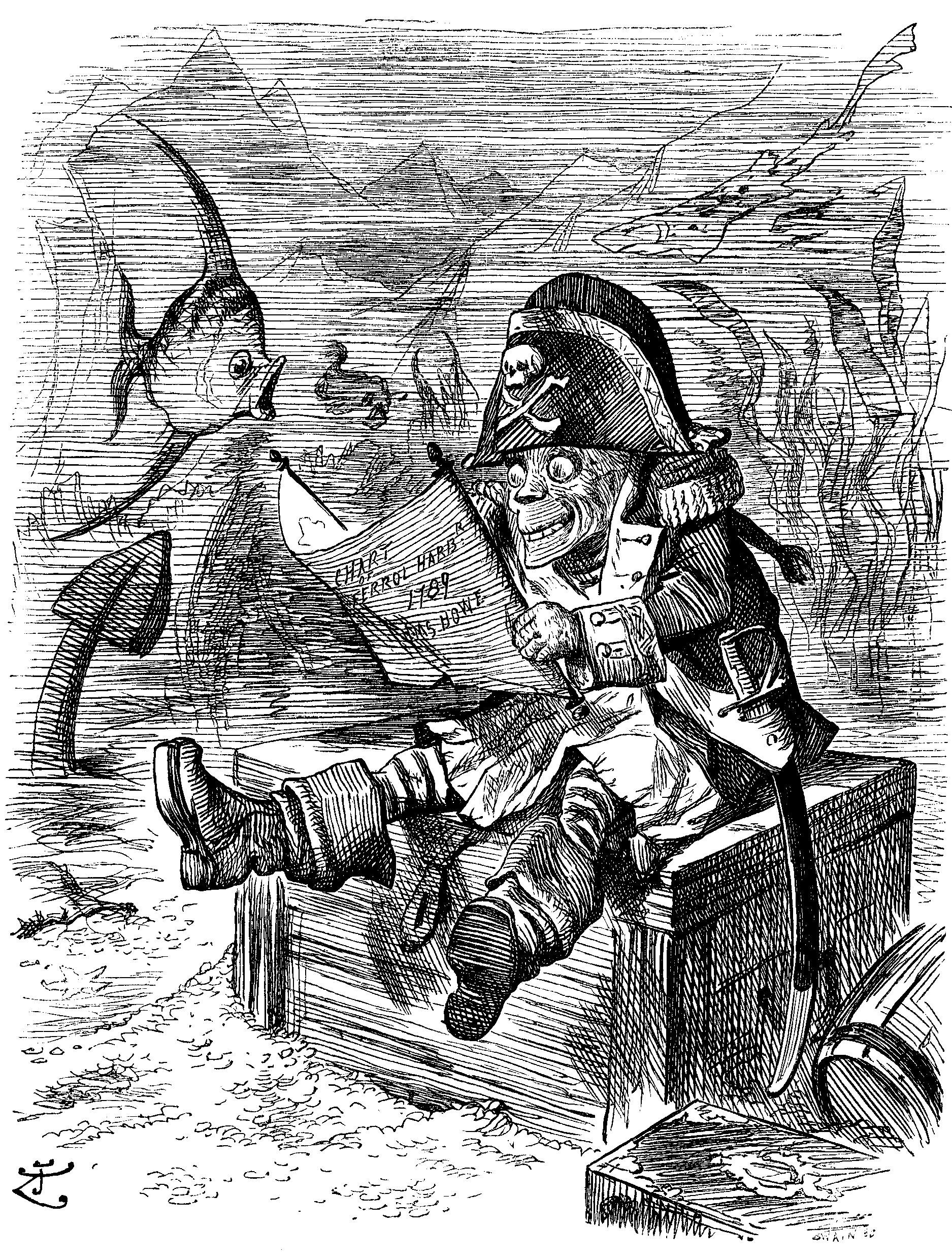
Davy Jones' Locker, 1892 Punch cartoon by Sir John Tenniel

Sir John Tenniel—illustrator of Alice's Adventures in Wonderland—joined Punch in 1850, and over 50 years contributed over two thousand cartoons.

Cartoons can be divided into gag cartoons, which include editorial cartoons, and comic strips.

Modern single-panel gag cartoons, found in magazines, generally consist of a single drawing with a typeset caption positioned beneath, or, less often, a speech balloon. Newspaper syndicates have also distributed single-panel gag cartoons by Mel Calman, Bill Holman, Gary Larson, George Lichty, Fred Neher and others. Many consider New Yorker cartoonist Peter Arno the father of the modern gag cartoon (as did Arno himself). The roster of magazine gag cartoonists includes Charles Addams, Charles Barsotti, and Chon Day.

Bill Hoest, Jerry Marcus, and Virgil Partch began as magazine gag cartoonists and moved to syndicated comic strips. Richard Thompson illustrated numerous feature articles in The Washington Post before creating his Cul de Sac comic strip. The sports section of newspapers usually feature cartoons, sometimes including syndicated features such as Chester "Chet" Brown's All in Sport.

Editorial cartoons are found almost exclusively in news publications and news websites. Although they also employ humor, they are more serious in tone, commonly using irony or satire. The art usually acts as a visual metaphor to illustrate a point of view on current social or political topics. Editorial cartoons often include speech balloons and sometimes use multiple panels. Editorial cartoonists of note include Herblock, David Low, Jeff MacNelly, Mike Peters, and Gerald Scarfe.

Comic strips, also known as cartoon strips in the United Kingdom, are found daily in newspapers worldwide, and are usually a short series of cartoon illustrations in sequence. In the United States, they are not commonly called "cartoons" themselves, but rather "comics" or "funnies". Nonetheless, the creators of comic strips—as well as comic books and graphic novels—are usually referred to as "cartoonists". Although humor is the most prevalent subject matter, adventure and drama are also represented in this medium. Some noteworthy cartoonists of humorous comic strips are Scott Adams, Charles Schulz, E. C. Segar, Mort Walker and Bill Watterson.

=== Political ===
Political cartoons are like illustrated editorials that serve visual commentaries on political events. They offer subtle criticism which are cleverly quoted with humour and satire to the extent that the criticized does not get embittered.

The pictorial satire of William Hogarth is regarded as a precursor to the development of political cartoons in 18th century England. George Townshend produced some of the first overtly political cartoons and caricatures in the 1750s. The medium began to develop in the latter part of the 18th century under the direction of its great exponents, James Gillray and Thomas Rowlandson, both from London. Gillray explored the use of the medium for lampooning and caricature, and has been referred to as the father of the political cartoon. By calling the king, prime ministers and generals to account for their behaviour, many of Gillray's satires were directed against George III, depicting him as a pretentious buffoon, while the bulk of his work was dedicated to ridiculing the ambitions of revolutionary France and Napoleon. George Cruikshank became the leading cartoonist in the period following Gillray, from 1815 until the 1840s. His career was renowned for his social caricatures of English life for popular publications.

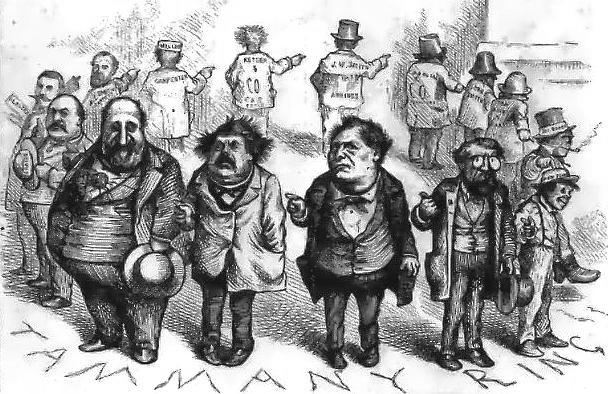
Nast depicts the Tweed Ring: "Who stole the people's money?" / "'Twas him."

By the mid 19th century, major political newspapers in many other countries featured cartoons commenting on the politics of the day. Thomas Nast, in New York City, showed how realistic German drawing techniques could redefine American cartooning. His 160 cartoons relentlessly pursued the criminal characteristic of the Tweed machine in New York City, and helped bring it down. Indeed, Tweed was arrested in Spain when police identified him from Nast's cartoons. In Britain, Sir John Tenniel was the toast of London. In France under the July Monarchy, Honoré Daumier took up the new genre of political and social caricature, most famously lampooning the rotund King Louis Philippe.

Political cartoons can be humorous or satirical, sometimes with piercing effect. The target of the humor may complain, but can seldom fight back. Lawsuits have been very rare; the first successful lawsuit against a cartoonist in over a century in Britain came in 1921, when J. H. Thomas, the leader of the National Union of Railwaymen (NUR), initiated libel proceedings against the magazine of the British Communist Party. Thomas claimed defamation in the form of cartoons and words depicting the events of "Black Friday", when he allegedly betrayed the locked-out Miners' Federation. To Thomas, the framing of his image by the far left threatened to grievously degrade his character in the popular imagination. Soviet-inspired communism was a new element in European politics, and cartoonists unrestrained by tradition tested the boundaries of libel law. Thomas won the lawsuit and restored his reputation.

=== Scientific ===
Cartoons such as xkcd have also found their place in the world of science, mathematics, and technology. For example, the cartoon Wonderlab looked at daily life in the chemistry lab. In the U.S., one well-known cartoonist for these fields is Sidney Harris. Many of Gary Larson's cartoons have a scientific flavor.

=== Comic books ===
The first comic-strip cartoons were of a humorous tone. Notable early humor comics include the Swiss comic-strip book Mr. Vieux Bois (1837), the British strip Ally Sloper (first appearing in 1867) and the American strip Yellow Kid (first appearing in 1895).

In the United States in the 1930s, books with cartoons were magazine-format "American comic books" with original material, or occasionally reprints of newspaper comic strips.

In Britain in the 1930s, adventure comic magazines became quite popular, especially those published by DC Thomson; the publisher sent observers around the country to talk to boys and learn what they wanted to read about. The story line in magazines, comic books and cinema that most appealed to boys was the glamorous heroism of British soldiers fighting wars that were exciting and just. DC Thomson issued the first The Dandy Comic in December 1937. It had a revolutionary design that broke away from the usual children's comics that were published broadsheet in size and not very colourful. Thomson capitalized on its success with a similar product The Beano in 1938.

On some occasions, new gag cartoons have been created for book publication.

== Animation ==
An animated cartoon horse, drawn by rotoscoping from Eadweard Muybridge's 19th-century photos

Because of the stylistic similarities between comic strips and early animated films, cartoon came to refer to animation, and the word cartoon is now used for both animated cartoons and gag cartoons. While animation designates any style of illustrated images seen in rapid succession to give the impression of movement, the word "cartoon" is most often used as a descriptor for television programs and short films aimed at children, possibly featuring anthropomorphized animals, superheroes, the adventures of child protagonists or related themes.

== See also ==
- Billy Ireland Cartoon Library & Museum
- Caricature
- Comics
- Comics studies
- List of cartoonists
- List of editorial cartoonists
- List of comic strips
