= Adam O'Brian =

Welsh actor, director, and screenwriter

- Born: 21 August 1989 (age 36); Swansea, West Glamorgan, Wales
- Occupations: Actor, director, screenwriter

Adam O'Brian (born 21 August 1989) is a Welsh actor, director, and screenwriter.

== Early life ==
O'Brian was born in Swansea, West Glamorgan. He was raised in Minehead, Somerset, before leaving to study acting in Cardiff and London.

== Career ==
=== Acting ===
O'Brian began training as an actor at the National Youth Theatre in 2006. He appeared in several National Youth Theatre productions, including performances at the National Centre for the Performing Arts, the Beijing National Stadium, the Soho Theatre, the Trinity Laban Conservatoire of Music and Dance, and Buckingham Palace. He completed his acting training at the Royal Welsh College of Music and Drama, graduating in 2010. While still training at drama school, he performed at Shakespeare's Globe as part of the 2010 Sam Wanamaker Festival. His professional career began at Theatre by the Lake when he appeared in the 2010 repertory season as Tom Wingfield in The Glass Menagerie, Laurence in Shining City and Nicholas in What the Butler Saw. He returned to Theatre by the Lake in 2012 to appear as Pony William in David Harrower's Knives in Hens.

In 2012, O'Brian starred as Frédéric Bourdin in the film The Imposter. The film premiered in competition at the Sundance Film Festival, and went on to win awards at several film festivals later that year, including the Hot Docs Canadian International Documentary Festival, the Miami International Film Festival, and the Zurich Film Festival. It was selected as part of the "Festival Favourites" category at SXSW in Texas, and was nominated for five Cinema Eye Honors, including one for Best Film. It was nominated for three London Film Critics Circle Awards, including one for Best Film, and won the for Documentary of the Year award. It was nominated for six British Independent Film Awards, including Best Film and Best Director, and went on to win the award for Best Documentary.

The film was also nominated for a Critic's Choice Movie Award, and for a South Bank Sky Arts Award for Best Film. It was listed as one of the 'Top Ten Best Films of 2012' by several publications including Total Film and Time Out New York. It was shortlisted for an Academy Award for Best Documentary, and after being nominated for two BAFTAs, including one for Best Documentary, it went on to win the award for Outstanding Debut by a British Director or Producer. BAFTA-winning director Bart Layton described O'Brian's performance as "really brilliant and clever".

O'Brian has toured with the English Touring Theatre, appearing as Billy in Tom Stoppard's The Real Thing in 2012, a joint production with the West Yorkshire Playhouse.

=== Writing and directing ===
O'Brian has worked as a writer and director for Poleroid Theatre. He has also written for Undeb Theatre, and performed his own writing at the Royal Court Theatre as part of the RWCMD Actors Showcase.
