= Minehead =

Town in Somerset, England

Coordinates: 51°12′14″N 3°28′52″W

- Town
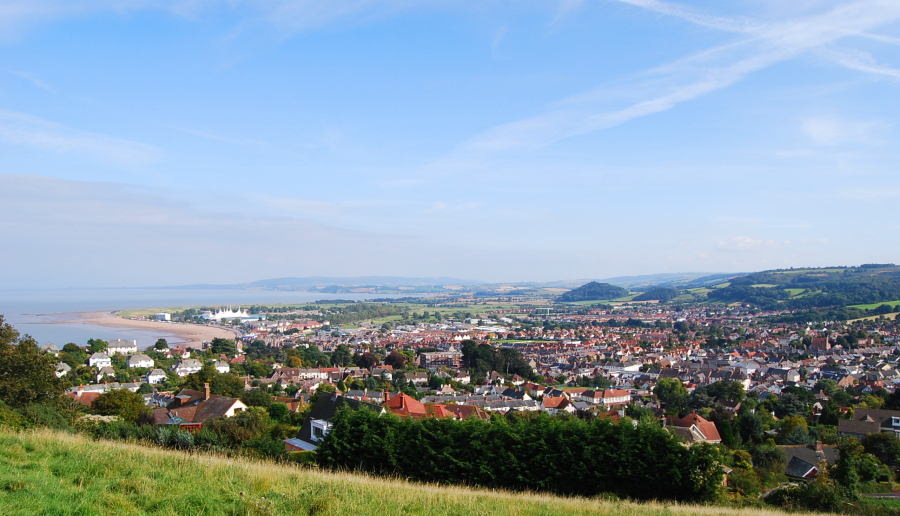
- View over Minehead from the west, 2009

- Location within Somerset
- Population: 11,752 (Parish, 2021)
- OS grid reference: SS966460
- Civil parish: Minehead
- Unitary authority: Somerset Council
- Ceremonial county: Somerset
- Region: South West
- Country: England
- Sovereign state: United Kingdom
- Post town: Minehead
- Postcode district: TA24
- Dialling code: 01643
- Police: Avon and Somerset
- Fire: Devon and Somerset
- Ambulance: South Western
- UK Parliament: Tiverton and Minehead
- Website: Town Council

Minehead is a coastal town and civil parish in Somerset, England. It lies on the south bank of the Bristol Channel, 21 miles (34 km) north-west of the county town of Taunton, 12 miles (19 km) from the boundary with the county of Devon and close to the Exmoor National Park. The parish includes Alcombe and Woodcombe, suburban villages which have been subsumed into Minehead. At the 2021 census, the parish had a population of 11,752.

There was a small port at Minehead by 1380, which grew into a major trading centre during the medieval period. Most trade transferred to larger ports during the 20th century, but pleasure steamers continued to call at the port. Major rebuilding took place in the Lower or Middle town area following a fire in 1791. The fortunes of the town revived with the growth in sea bathing, and by 1851 was becoming a retirement centre. There was a marked increase in building during the early years of the 20th century, which resulted in the wide main shopping avenue and adjacent roads with Edwardian-style architecture. The town is the home of a Butlins Holiday Park, which increases the seasonal tourist population by several thousand.

There are a variety of schools and religious, cultural and sporting facilities including sailing, windsurfing and golf. An ancient local tradition involves the Hobby Horse, which takes to the streets for four days on the eve of the first of May each year, with accompanying musicians and rival horses. The town is the starting point of the South West Coast Path National Trail, the nation's longest long-distance countryside walking trail. The Minehead Railway, which opened in 1874 and closed in 1971, has since been reopened as the West Somerset Railway.

== Toponym ==
The town sits at the foot of a steeply rising outcrop of Exmoor known as North Hill, and the original name of the town was mynydd, which means mountain in Welsh. It has also been written as Mynheafdon (1046), Maneheve (1086), Menehewed (1225) and Menedun (also 1225), which contain elements of Welsh and Old English words for hill.

== History ==
The earliest known fossilised forest was discovered in the Hangman Sandstone Formation near to the Butlins Holiday Park. The trees, identified as a species resembling modern palm trees, known as calamophyton, date back to the Devonian period, between 419 and 358 million years ago.

Evidence of prehistoric occupation of the area are Bronze Age barrows at Selworthy Beacon and an Iron Age enclosure at Furzebury Brake west of the town, although there is also possible evidence in the intertidal area, where the remains of a submerged forest still exist.

Minehead was part of the hundred of Carhampton. It is mentioned as a manor belonging to William de Moyon in the Domesday Book in 1086, although it had previously been held by Ælfgar, Earl of Mercia. William de Moyon and his descendants administered the area from Dunster Castle, which was later sold to Lady Elizabeth Luttrell.

Minehead Harbour Act 1700
- Act of Parliament
- Parliament of England
- Long title: An Act for recovering, securing, and keeping in repair the harbour of Minehead, for the benefit and support of the navigation and trade of this kingdom.
- Citation: 12 & 13 Will. 3. c. 9
- Territorial extent: England and Wales

Dates
- Royal assent: 12 June 1701
- Commencement: 6 February 1701 (Note: Start of session.)
- Repealed: 27 June 1823
Other legislation
Amended by	Minehead Harbour Act 1711; Minehead Harbour Act 1737; Minehead Harbour Act 1770
Repealed by	Minehead Pier and Harbour Act 1823

Status: Repealed

Text of statute as originally enacted

Minehead Harbour Act 1711
- Act of Parliament
- Parliament of Great Britain
- Long title: An Act for prolonging the Term for Payment of certain Duties, granted by an Act made in the Twelfth and Thirteenth Years of His late Majesty King William, intituled, "An Act for recovering, securing, and keeping in Repair, the Harbour of Minehead, for the Benefit and Support of the Navigation and Trade of this Kingdom."
- Citation: 10 Ann. c. 32 (Note: This is the citation in The Statutes of the Realm.); 10 Ann. c. 24 (Note: This is the citation in The Statutes at Large.)
- Territorial extent: Great Britain

Dates
- Royal assent: 22 May 1712
- Commencement: 7 December 1711
- Repealed: 2 September 1857
Other legislation
Amends	Minehead Harbour Act 1700
Amended by	Watchet Harbour Act 1720; Minehead Harbour Act 1737; Minehead Harbour Act 1770; West Somerset Mineral Railway Act 1855
Repealed by	Watchet Harbour Act 1857
Relates to	Watchet Harbour Act 1707

Status: Repealed

Text of statute as originally enacted

Minehead Harbour Act 1737
- Act of Parliament
- Parliament of Great Britain
- Long title: An Act for continuing the Terms and Powers granted and given by the Acts passed in the Twelfth and Thirteenth Year of the Reign of His late Majesty King William, and the Tenth Year of Her late Majesty Queen Anne, for recovering, securing, and keeping in Repair, the Harbour of Minehead, in the County of Somerset.
- Citation: 11 Geo. 2. c. 8
- Territorial extent: Great Britain

Dates
- Royal assent: 20 May 1738
- Commencement: 24 January 1738
- Repealed: 27 June 1823
Other legislation
Amends	Minehead Harbour Act 1700; Minehead Harbour Act 1711
Amended by	Minehead Harbour Act 1770
Repealed by	Minehead Pier and Harbour Act 1823

Status: Repealed

Text of statute as originally enacted

Minehead Harbour Act 1770
- Act of Parliament
- Parliament of Great Britain
- Long title: An Act For further continuing the Terms and Powers granted and continued by Three Acts, passed in the Twelfth and Thirteenth Years of William the Third, the Tenth of Queen Anne, and in the Eleventh Year of His late Majesty George the Second, for recovering, securing, and keeping in Repair, the Harbour of Minehead, in the County of Somerset, and for the more effectual carrying the said Acts, into Execution, and also for the better securing the ancient Dues payable to the Lord or Lady of the Manor of Minehead for the Time being.
- Citation: 10 Geo. 3. c. 26
- Territorial extent: Great Britain

Dates
- Royal assent: 12 April 1770
- Commencement: 9 January 1770
- Repealed: 27 June 1823
Other legislation
Amends	Minehead Harbour Act 1700; Minehead Harbour Act 1711; Minehead Harbour Act 1737
Repealed by	Minehead Pier and Harbour Act 1823

Status: Repealed

Text of statute as originally enacted

Minehead Pier and Harbour Act 1823
- Act of Parliament
- Parliament of the United Kingdom
- Long title: An Act for more effectually improving and keeping in Repair the Pier and Harbour of Minehead in the County of Somerset.
- Citation: 4 Geo. 4. c. cxiii
- Territorial extent: United Kingdom

Dates
- Royal assent: 27 June 1823
- Commencement: 27 June 1823 (Note: The Acts of Parliament (Commencement) Act 1793.)
Other legislation
Repeals/revokes	Minehead Harbour Act 1737; Minehead Harbour Act 1770

Status: Current legislation

Text of statute as originally enacted

Pier and Harbour Order (Minehead) Confirmation Act 1952
- Act of Parliament
- Parliament of the United Kingdom
- Long title: An Act to confirm a Provisional Order made by the Minister of Transport under the General Pier and Harbour Act 1861 relating to Minehead.
- Citation: 15 & 16 Geo. 6 & 1 Eliz. 2. c. xxix
- Territorial extent: United Kingdom

Dates
- Royal assent: 1 August 1952
- Commencement: 1 August 1952 (Note: Section 2.)
Other legislation
Relates to	General Pier and Harbour Act 1861

Status: Current legislation

Text of statute as originally enacted

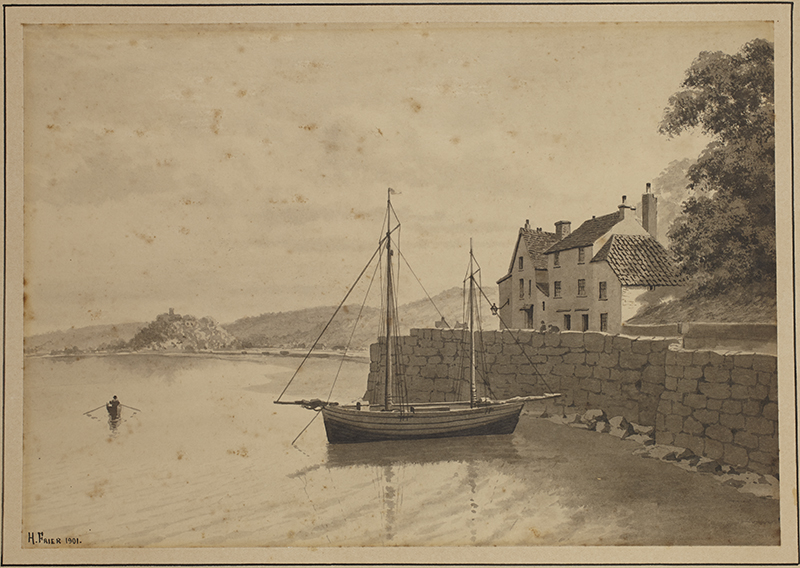
Minehead, View from Quay, watercolour on paper by Harry Frier in 1901

There was a small port at Minehead by 1380, but it was not until 1420 that money given by Lady Margaret Luttrell enabled improvements to be made and a jetty built. During the reign of Elizabeth I, the town had its own Port Officer similar to the position at Bristol. Vessels in the 15th century included the Trinite which traded between Ireland and Bristol, and others carrying salt and other cargo from La Rochelle in France. Other products included local wool and cloth which were traded for coal from South Wales.

In 1559, a charter of incorporation, established a free borough and parliamentary representation, but was made conditional on improvements being made to the port. The harbour silted up and fell into disrepair so that, in 1604, James I withdrew the town's charter. Control reverted to the Luttrells and a new harbour was built, at a cost of £5,000, further out to sea than the original, which had been at the mouth of the Bratton Stream. It incorporated a pier, dating from 1616, and was built to replace that at Dunster which was silting up. Trade was primarily with Wales for cattle, sheep, wool, butter, fish and coal. These are commemorated in the town arms which include a woolpack and sailing ship. Privateers based at Minehead were involved in the war with Spain and France during 1625–1630 and again during the War of the Spanish Succession from 1702 to 1713. The first cranes were installed after further improvements to the port in 1714.

By the beginning of the 18th century, trade between Minehead and Ireland, South Wales, Bristol and Bridgwater grew, with forty vessels based in the harbour for trade and herring fishing. It was also a departure point for pilgrims to Santiago de Compostela. Until the 19th century, trade continued with Ireland but Minehead vessels started to travel further afield to Virginia and the West Indies. In 1808 a ship, believed to be the Bristol Packet which had been built in 1801, was wrecked on Madbrain Sands. Further problems with the port continued and led to a decline in trade and the fisheries in the late 18th century and in 1834 the port lost its jurisdiction to Bridgwater. In the 20th century most trade transferred to larger ports, but pleasure steamers did call at the port. Minehead Lifeboat Station was established in 1901 near the harbour. The pier was demolished during the Second World War as it obstructed the view from the gun battery set up on the quay head, as part of the coastal defence preparations, which stopped steamers calling at the harbour until it was cleared in 1951.

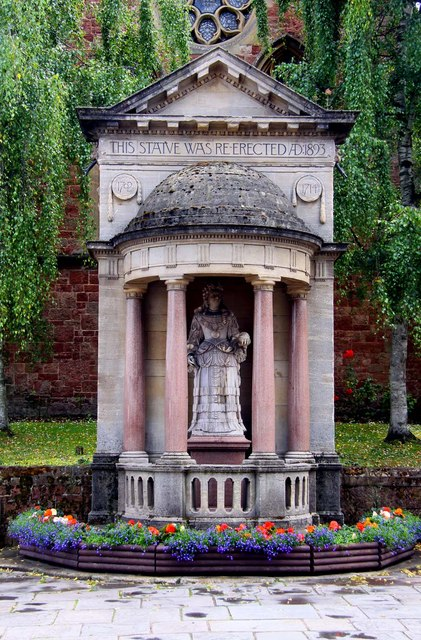
Statue of Queen Anne in Wellington Square

Major rebuilding took place in the Lower or Middle town area following a fire in 1791. In that year a Carrara marble statue of Queen Anne, sculpted by Francis Bird was presented to the town by Sir Jacob Bancks, who served as the local Member of Parliament from 1698 to 1715. It originally stood in the parish church but was moved to Wellington Square in 1893, when the marble pedestal and canopy by H. Dare Bryan were added. Lower town and the quay area were rebuilt and the fortunes of the town revived with the growth in sea bathing, and by 1851 was becoming a retirement centre.

Early areas of development of the town include Higher Town with its cottages, many of which are "listed" buildings of historic interest, some of which are still thatched, and the Quay area. In Victorian times wealthy industrialists built large houses on North Hill and hotels were developed so that tourism became an important industry. It was in the Victorian and Edwardian era that tourism in the town increased. There was a marked increase in building in the early years of the 20th century when the landowners, the Luttrells of Dunster Castle, released extensive building land. Probably the most prolific Edwardian architect was W.J.Tamlyn from North Devon, who settled in the town and was responsible for designing several hundred domestic properties, as well as Minehead Town Hall and the Queen's Hall.

The steamship SS Pelican grounded in Minehead Bay on 22 June 1928, on an unmarked reef known as the Gables that circles Minehead Bay, 0.7 miles (1.1 km) from land. The Pelican was sailing from Port Talbot to Highbridge. The crew of five were rescued by the Minehead Lifeboat. Evacuees were billeted in Minehead during World War II. During the war, on the night of the 7/8 April 1941, the town was bombed by KG 54, a Luftwaffe bomber wing. Butlins opened a holiday camp in 1962, which has brought thousands of visitors to the town.

== Governance ==
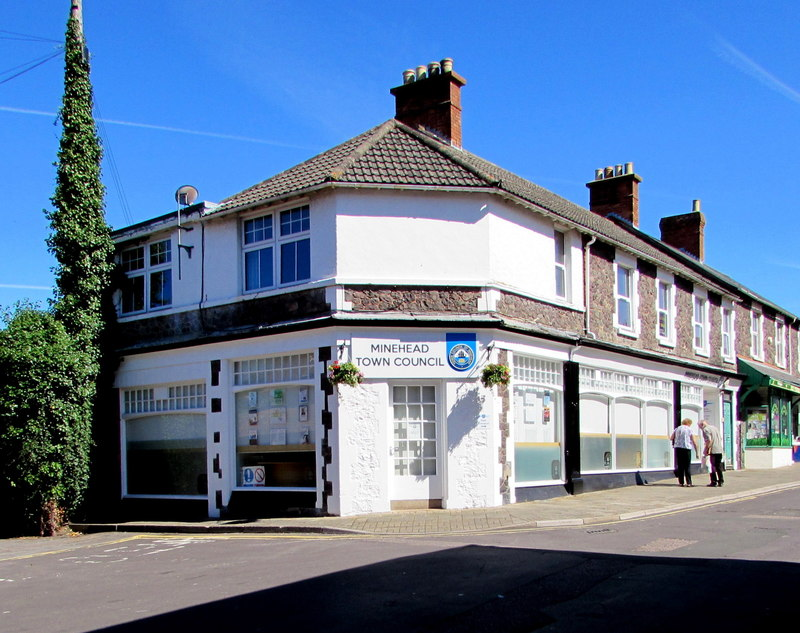
Town Council's offices, 3 Summerland Road

There are two tiers of local government covering Minehead, at parish (town) and unitary authority level: Minehead Town Council and Somerset Council. The town council is based at 3 Summerland Road.

For national elections, the town forms part of the Tiverton and Minehead constituency.

=== Administrative history ===
Minehead was an ancient parish in the Carhampton hundred of Somerset. A local government district was established in 1891 covering the eastern part of the parish around the town itself. Such districts were reconstituted as urban districts under the Local Government Act 1894, which also directed that civil parishes could no longer straddle district boundaries. The civil parish of Minehead was therefore reduced to match the urban district, and the remainder, covering the rural area to the west of the town, became a separate civil parish called Minehead Without.

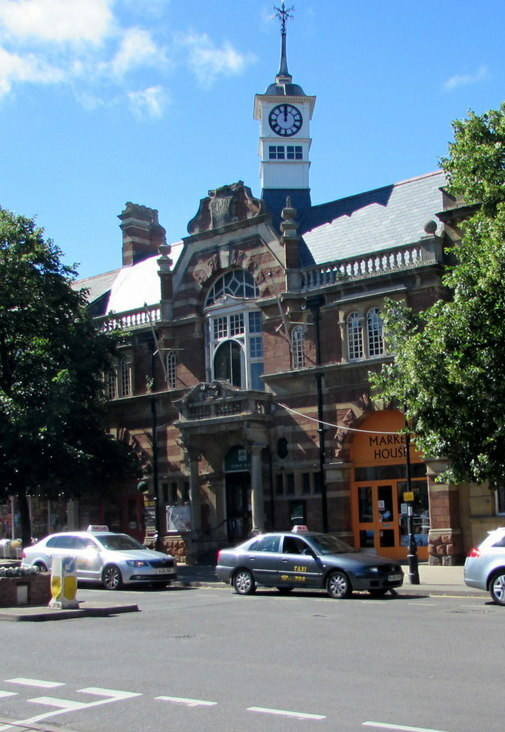
Minehead Town Hall

Minehead Town Hall, also called the Market House, was built in 1902 on The Parade to provide an indoor market venue and a council chamber and offices for the urban district council. The urban district was enlarged in 1916 to take in Woodcombe from the Minehead Without parish, and Alcombe from the neighbouring parish of Dunster.

Minehead Urban District was abolished in 1974 under the Local Government Act 1972, with its area becoming part of the new West Somerset district. No successor parish was created for the former urban district, and so it became unparished. A new civil parish of Minehead covering the area of the pre-1974 urban district was subsequently established in 1983, with its parish council taking the name Minehead Town Council. The town council based itself at the Town Hall until 2017, when the building was sold for conversion.

West Somerset was abolished in 2019, becoming part of the short-lived district of Somerset West and Taunton, which was in turn abolished four years later in 2023. Somerset County Council then took over district-level functions across its area, making it a unitary authority, and was renamed Somerset Council. Most of the parish forms the Minehead electoral division, with the exception of an area in the south-east of the parish, including Alcombe and Ellicombe, which is within the Dunster division.

== Geography ==
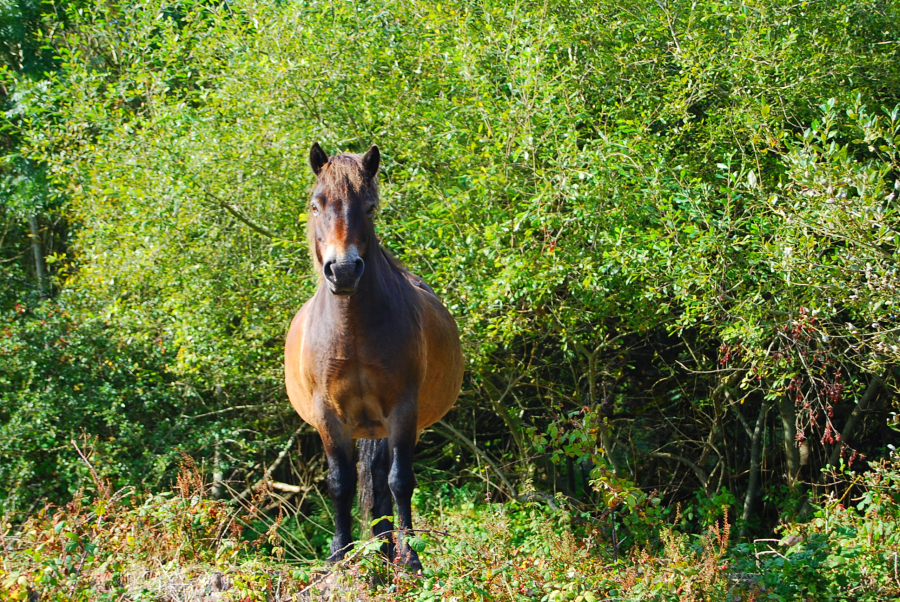
One of the wild ponies on North Hill

Minehead is on the Bristol Channel coast of South West England, and thus experiences one of the highest tidal ranges in the world. The tidal rise and fall in the Bristol Channel can be as great as 48 feet (15 m), second only to the Bay of Fundy in Eastern Canada.

The town is overlooked by North Hill, which rises steeply from the harbour shoreline. The town lies just outside the boundaries of Exmoor National Park. The cliff exposures around the shoreline are dramatic and fossils are exposed. Areas of the town include Higher Town, Quay Town and Lower or Middle Town, although they are no longer separate.

In 1990, much of Minehead's beach was washed away in a severe storm which also caused serious flooding in the town. A £12.6 million sea defence scheme by the Environment Agency was designed to reduce the risk of this erosion and flooding happening in the future. The agency built 1.1 miles (1.8 km) of new sea wall and rock or concrete stepped revetments between 1997 and 1998, and imported 320,000 tons of sand in 1999 to build a new beach. This beach sits between four rock groynes and has been built at a much higher level than the previous beach so that the waves are broken before they reach the new sea wall. Any waves that do reach the new wall are turned back by its curved shape. The town's new sea defences were officially opened in 2001.

Blenheim Gardens, which is Minehead's largest park, was opened in 1925. The bandstand within the park is used to host musical events.

=== Climate ===
Along with the rest of South West England, Minehead has a temperate climate, which is generally wetter and milder than the rest of England. The annual mean temperature is about 10 °C (50 °F) with seasonal and diurnal variations, but due to the modifying effect of the sea, the range is less than in most other parts of the United Kingdom. January is the coldest month with mean minimum temperatures between 1 °C (34 °F) and 2 °C (36 °F). July and August are the warmest months in the region with mean daily maxima around 21 °C (70 °F). In general, December is the dullest month and June the sunniest. The south west of England enjoys a favoured location, particularly in summer, when the Azores High extends its influence north-eastwards towards the UK.

Clouds often form inland, especially near hills, and reduces exposure to sunshine. The average annual sunshine totals around 1,600 hours. Rainfall tends to be associated with Atlantic depressions or with convection. In summer, convection caused by solar surface heating sometimes forms shower clouds and a large proportion of the annual precipitation falls from showers and thunderstorms at this time of year. Average rainfall is around 800–900 mm (31–35 in). About 8–15 days of snowfall is typical. November to March have the highest mean wind speeds, with June to August having the lightest. The predominant wind direction is from the south-west.

Climate data for Minehead (1991–2020 normals, extremes 1987–1995)
Month	Jan	Feb	Mar	Apr	May	Jun	Jul	Aug	Sep	Oct	Nov	Dec	Year
Record high °C (°F)	14.6 (58.3)	16.5 (61.7)	20.1 (68.2)	23.3 (73.9)	24.5 (76.1)	29.6 (85.3)	31.0 (87.8)	34.1 (93.4)	25.0 (77.0)	22.2 (72.0)	17.1 (62.8)	15.9 (60.6)	34.1 (93.4)
Mean daily maximum °C (°F)	9.1 (48.4)	9.6 (49.3)	11.3 (52.3)	13.7 (56.7)	16.6 (61.9)	19.3 (66.7)	21.1 (70.0)	20.8 (69.4)	18.8 (65.8)	15.3 (59.5)	12.0 (53.6)	9.6 (49.3)	14.8 (58.6)
Daily mean °C (°F)	6.6 (43.9)	6.7 (44.1)	8.1 (46.6)	10.0 (50.0)	12.8 (55.0)	15.4 (59.7)	17.3 (63.1)	17.3 (63.1)	15.5 (59.9)	12.3 (54.1)	9.3 (48.7)	7.1 (44.8)	11.5 (52.8)
Mean daily minimum °C (°F)	4.0 (39.2)	3.7 (38.7)	4.8 (40.6)	6.2 (43.2)	8.9 (48.0)	11.5 (52.7)	13.5 (56.3)	13.7 (56.7)	12.1 (53.8)	9.3 (48.7)	6.6 (43.9)	4.5 (40.1)	8.3 (46.9)
Record low °C (°F)	−4.7 (23.5)	−6.1 (21.0)	−2.1 (28.2)	−2.1 (28.2)	2.9 (37.2)	2.7 (36.9)	8.9 (48.0)	8.1 (46.6)	4.9 (40.8)	−0.5 (31.1)	−5.2 (22.6)	−5.7 (21.7)	−6.1 (21.0)
Average precipitation mm (inches)	105.8 (4.17)	78.1 (3.07)	54.0 (2.13)	50.9 (2.00)	61.2 (2.41)	54.9 (2.16)	50.7 (2.00)	50.0 (1.97)	64.8 (2.55)	105.1 (4.14)	110.8 (4.36)	110.2 (4.34)	896.6 (35.30)
Average precipitation days (≥ 1.0 mm)	14.8	12.5	10.9	10.0	9.7	9.2	9.1	10.3	9.8	14.2	15.9	15.1	141.4
Mean monthly sunshine hours	56.3	82.6	127.5	182.8	226.4	227.0	223.7	199.9	161.7	104.1	60.3	46.0	1,698.2
Source 1: Met Office
Source 2: Starlings Roost Weather

== Landmarks ==
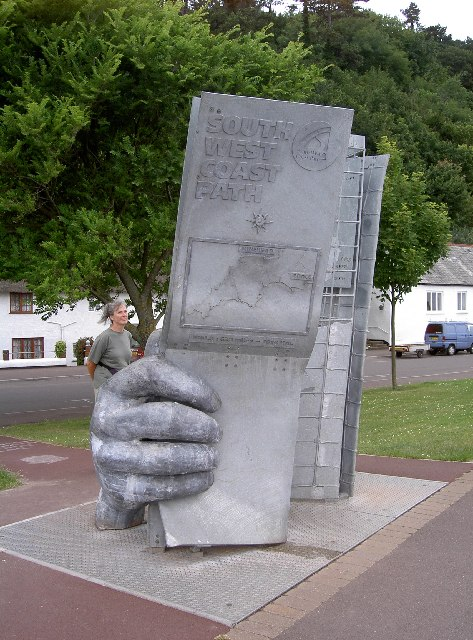
Sculpture marking the start of the South West Coast Path

The town's major tourist attraction is Butlins holiday camp. Others include: the terminus of the West Somerset Railway; the town's main ornamental park, Blenheim Gardens, off Blenheim Road; and the Minehead & West Somerset Golf Club, Somerset's oldest golf club, established in 1882, which has an 18-hole links course. A variety of sailing and wind surfing options are on offer, as well as the usual beach activities. There are many other attractions and amusement arcades, for example "Merlins" and a variety of well-known high street stores such as WHSmith and Boots, together with independent local shops. The town has both a Tesco and a Morrisons supermarket on its outskirts as well as a new Lidl.

The South West Coast Path National Trail starts at a marker, erected in Minehead in 2001, partly paid for by the South West Coast Path Association. The UK's longest long-distance countryside walking trail, it runs along the South West Coast to Poole in Dorset.

== Transport ==
The town's location—sea to the north and Exmoor to the south—means that transport links are limited. Minehead is located on the A39 road, and is 28 miles (45 km) north-west of the M5 motorway at junction 24.

Local bus services are operated by First West of England and Quantock Motor Services.

Minehead railway station is close to the beach. The Minehead Railway was opened on 16 July 1874, linking the town to Taunton and beyond. It was operated by the Bristol and Exeter Railway which was amalgamated into the Great Western Railway in 1876. The Minehead Railway was itself absorbed into the GWR in 1897, which in turn was nationalised into British Railways in 1948. It was closed on 4 January 1971 but has since been reopened as the West Somerset Railway, which is notable for being the longest standard-gauge heritage railway in Britain.

== Media ==
Minehead's local radio station is the community-based West Somerset Radio. The local newspapers are West Somerset Free Press and Somerset County Gazette.

== Education ==
In Minehead, there are two first schools, one middle school (Minehead Middle School) and an upper school, West Somerset College, which provides education for 1,298 students between the ages of 13 and 18. In 2006 there was debate about changing West Somerset's 3-tier school system to a 2-tier system to match the rest of Somerset and the majority of education authorities in the UK.

== Religious sites ==
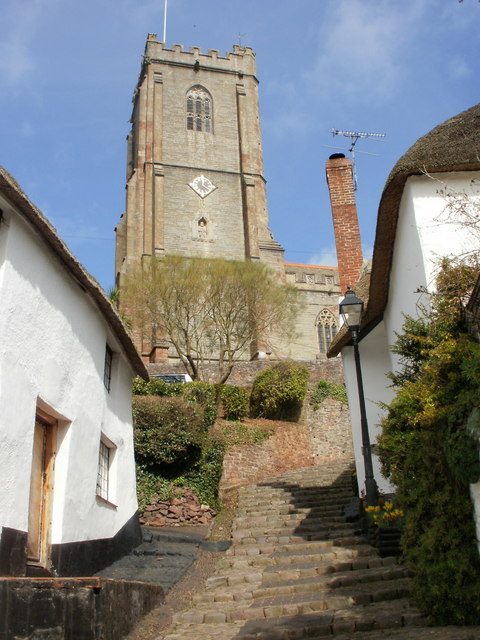
St Michael's Church tower

The Anglican parish church of St Michael dates from the 15th century and has been designated by English Heritage as a Grade II* listed building; its tower used to display a beacon light for ships approaching the harbour. After being caught in a violent storm at sea, Robert Quirke dedicated a ship and its cargo to God's service, as well as donating a cellar near the quay for prayers to be offered for those at sea. Dating from 1628 and known as the Gibraltar Celler [sic], it is now the Chapel of St Peter. Quirke also donated money from the sale of the ship and its cargo to build almshouses.

St Michael's parish church contains a number of historical highlights, including an impressive late medieval rood screen and rood stair, and an attractive stained glass window designed by Sir Henry Holiday. There are views from the churchyard of the surrounding hills and coastline.

The Church of St Michael the Archangel in Alcombe was built in 1903 as a chapel of ease for the Dunster parish, but in 1953 it became the Parish Church of Alcombe in its own right. St Andrew's Church, on Wellington Square in the town, was built of red sandstone in 1877–1880, by George Edmund Street.

Butlins Minehead is the only Butlins resort still to have a small on-site chapel, and over the Easter period the resort hosts an annual Spring Harvest, the largest Christian festival in the UK. The Catholic parish of Minehead covers an area of 200 square miles (520 km^{2}) and is served by the Sacred Heart Parish Church, built in 1896, as well as a mass centre in the nearby village of Watchet. There are also religious sites serving the needs of the Baptist, Evangelical, Methodist and United Reformed communities and the Plymouth Brethren. Alcombe is also home to the Spiritualist Church in Grove Place.

== Local economy ==
Minehead has one of the UK's three remaining Butlins holiday camps, and tourism has been a part of Minehead's economy since Victorian times. At the height of the season in late July and early August, the town's population is significantly increased by tourists.

There is a Farmers' Market in the Parade every Friday from 8:30 am to 2 pm, selling local produce.

== Culture ==
The town hosts the annual Minehead and Exmoor Festival, a week-long classical music festival that has been running since 1963. Richard Dickins has held the post of artistic director for the festival since 1982.

The wooded bluffs above Minehead feature as the Hermit's abode "in that wood which slopes down to the sea", in The Rime of the Ancient Mariner by Romantic poet Samuel Taylor Coleridge. The poet lived nearby, at Nether Stowey (between Bridgwater and Minehead). His statue can be seen at the nearby harbour at Watchet. He and Wordsworth (who lived nearby at Alfoxton House) would often roam the hills and coast on long night walks; leading to local gossip that they were 'spies' for the French. The Government sent an agent to investigate, but found they were, indeed, "mere poets".

Cecil Frances Alexander wrote the popular Anglican hymn All Things Bright And Beautiful in Minehead, and in nearby Dunster the verse: "The purple headed mountain, The river running by, The sunset and the morning, That brightens up the sky ... " refers to Grabbist Hill and the River Avill that runs near it through the popular tourist location Snowdrop Valley on Exmoor

Minehead was the setting of Monty Python's 1969 sketch The North Minehead By-Election (aka Mr. Hilter), in which Adolf Hitler (posing as a "Mr. Hilter"), Joachim von Ribbentrop ("Ron Vibbentrop") and Heinrich Himmler ("Heimlich Bimmler") conspire at a local rooming house to win the local by-election as the "National Bocialist" candidate, and unite Minehead with neighbouring Taunton (in the style of the Anschluss in 1938).

=== May Day Hobby Horse ===
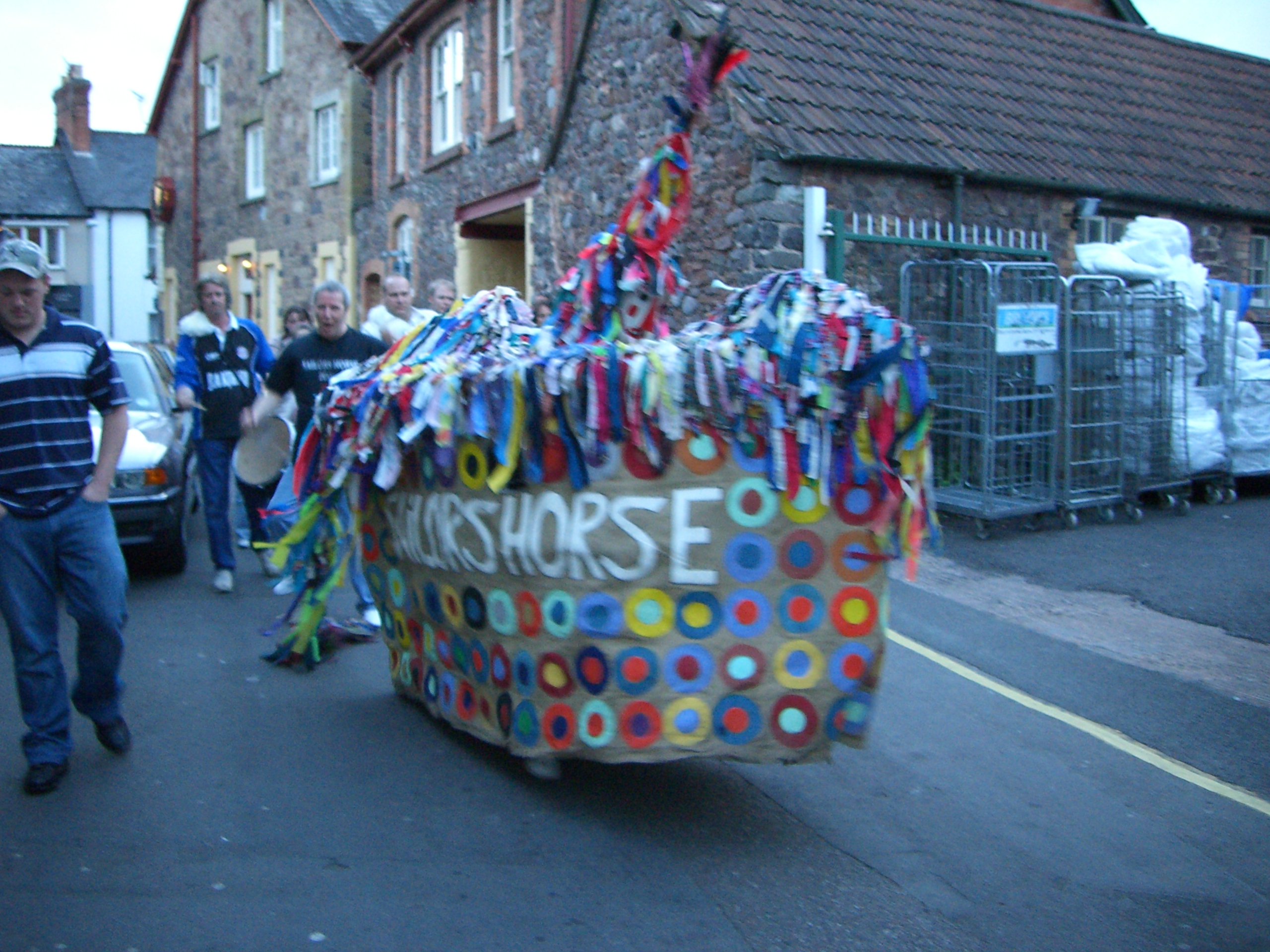
Minehead Hobby Horse

One popular ancient local tradition involves the Hobby Horse, or Obby Oss, which takes to the streets on the eve of the first of May each year, with accompanying musicians and rival horses, for four days. In fact there are three rival hobby horses, the Original Sailor's Horse, the Traditional Sailor's Horse and the Town Horse. They appear on May Eve (called "Show Night"), on May Day morning (when they salute the sunrise at a crossroads on the outskirts of town), 2 and 3 May (when a ceremony called "The Bootie" takes place in the evening called "Bootie Night" at part of town called Cher). Each horse is made of a boat-shaped wooden frame, pointed and built up at each end, which is carried on the dancer's shoulders.

As at Padstow, his face is hidden by a mask attached to a tall, pointed hat. The top surface of the horse is covered with ribbons and strips of fabric. A long fabric skirt, painted with rows of multicoloured roundels, hangs down to the ground all round. A long tail is attached to the back of the frame. Each horse is accompanied by a small group of musicians and attendants. The Town Horse is accompanied by "Gullivers", dressed similarly to the horse but without the large frame; as at Padstow, smaller, children's horses have sometimes been constructed. The horses' visits are (or were) believed to bring good luck. In the past there was also a similar hobby horse based at the nearby village of Dunster, which would sometimes visit Minehead. The first of May has been a festival day in Minehead since 1465.

== Sport and recreation ==
Minehead Barbarians, the town's rugby club, have been playing together since the 1930s, but the main local football club, Minehead A.F.C., is even older, founded in 1889. In September 2007, the TWIF European Outdoor tug of war championships was held at the football club's stadium. Minehead Cricket Club, based at the West Somerset College in Alcombe, field four men's teams and one women's team while Minehead Hockey Club plays close by at the West Somerset Sports & Leisure Centre. There is a bowls club on Irnham Road.

There have been proposals for a public swimming pool since at least 2009, and as of 2025 plans are being pursued by Minehead Swimming and Leisure Ltd, a community benefit society.

Minehead has on several occasions been the location of the Britain's Strongest Man contest, most recently in 2004, and since 2006 the Butlin's Resort has been one of the venues for the World Wrestling Entertainment's UK winter tour. In 2010, stage four of the Tour of Britain road cycling race started in Minehead.

The 2011 European Outdoor tug of war championships was held within the grounds of Butlin's Minehead from 22 to 25 September.

Since December 2012, Minehead has hosted the Professional Darts Corporation Players Championship Finals.

== Notable residents ==
- Richard Chorley (1927–2002), physical geographer, was born and brought up in Minehead.
- Arthur C. Clarke (1917–2008), science fiction writer, was born in Minehead.
- Edward Ellicott (1768–1847), naval officer during the French Revolutionary Wars and Napoleonic Wars, lived in Alcombe with his family and died there.
- Peter Hurford (1930–2019), organist and composer, was born in Minehead.
- Tim Kevan, writer, blogger and barrister, author of the Baby Barista series of books, was brought up in Minehead.
- Tony Lawson, Cambridge philosopher, born and grew up in Minehead.
- Stephen Mulhern (born 1977), television presenter, lived in Minehead at an early age, where his family owned the joke shop Magic Moments on The Avenue. His first job was as a Redcoat at Butlins Minehead, aged 17.
- Adam O'Brian (born 1989), actor in The Imposter, was brought up in Minehead.
- Sir Nick Partridge (born 1955), Chief Executive of The Terrence Higgins Trust, and a key campaigner on HIV and AIDS, lived in the town in the 1970s when his family moved there to run a hotel.
- Danielle Waterman (born 1985), member of the England women's national rugby union team and member of the 2014 Women's Rugby World Cup-winning team, was brought up in Minehead.
