= Houston Film Critics Society Awards 2012 =

Annual US film awards ceremony

6th Houston Film Critics Society Awards
- Date: January 5, 2013
- Location: Museum of Fine Arts; Houston, Texas
- Country: United States
- Presented by: Houston Film Critics Society
- Website: houstonfilmcritics.com/awards

The 6th Houston Film Critics Society Awards were given out at a ceremony held at the Museum of Fine Arts on January 5, 2013. The nominations were announced on December 15, 2012.

== Winners and nominees ==
Winners are listed first and highlighted with boldface.

Best Picture	Best Foreign Language Film
**Argo**; Beasts of the Southern Wild; Cloud Atlas; Django Unchained; Lincoln; The Master; Les Misérables; Moonrise Kingdom; Silver Linings Playbook; Zero Dark Thirty	**Holy Motors** • France/Germany; Amour • French; The Intouchables • French; A Royal Affair • Denmark; Rust and Bone • France/Belgium
Best Performance by an Actor in a Leading Role	Best Performance by an Actress in a Leading Role
**Daniel Day-Lewis** – **Lincoln**; John Hawkes – The Sessions; Hugh Jackman – Les Misérables; Joaquin Phoenix – The Master; Denzel Washington – Flight	**Jennifer Lawrence** – **Silver Linings Playbook**; Jessica Chastain – Zero Dark Thirty; Emmanuelle Riva – Amour; Quvenzhané Wallis – Beasts of the Southern Wild; Naomi Watts – The Impossible
Best Performance by an Actor in a Supporting Role	Best Performance by an Actress in a Supporting Role
**Tommy Lee Jones** – **Lincoln**; Alan Arkin – Argo; Javier Bardem – Skyfall; Philip Seymour Hoffman – The Master; Matthew McConaughey – Magic Mike	**Anne Hathaway** – **Les Misérables**; Amy Adams – The Master; Judi Dench – Skyfall; Sally Field – Lincoln; Helen Hunt – The Sessions
Best Direction of a Motion Picture	Best Cinematography
**Ben Affleck** – **Argo**; Quentin Tarantino – Django Unchained; Steven Spielberg – Lincoln; Tom Hooper – Les Misérables; Kathryn Bigelow – Zero Dark Thirty	**Skyfall** – **Roger Deakins**; Life of Pi – Claudio Miranda; Lincoln – Janusz Kamiński; The Master – Mihai Mălaimare Jr.; Les Misérables – Danny Cohen
Best Animated Feature Film	Best Documentary Feature
**Wreck-It Ralph**; Brave; Frankenweenie; ParaNorman; Rise of the Guardians	**Searching for Sugar Man**; Bully; The Central Park Five; The House I Live In; The Imposter; The Queen of Versailles
Best Original Score	Best Original Song
**Cloud Atlas – Reinhold Heil, Johnny Klimek, and Tom Tykwer**; Life of Pi – Mychael Danna; Hitchcock – Danny Elfman; The Master – Jonny Greenwood; Skyfall – Thomas Newman; Beasts of the Southern Wild – Dan Romer and Benh Zeitlin; Lincoln – John Williams	**"Skyfall"** by **Adele** – **Skyfall**; "Learn Me Right" by Mumford & Sons and Birdy – Brave; "Song of the Lonely Mountain" by Neil Finn – The Hobbit: An Unexpected Journey; "Suddenly" by Claude-Michel Schönberg – Les Misérables; "Touch the Sky" by Alex Mandel and Mark Andrews – Brave
Best Screenplay	Worst Film
**Lincoln** – **Tony Kushner**; Argo – Chris Terrio; Looper – Rian Johnson; Silver Linings Playbook – David O. Russell; Zero Dark Thirty – Mark Boal	**That's My Boy**; Anna Karenina; Battleship; Prometheus; The Three Stooges

=== Individual awards ===
==== Lifetime Achievement Award ====
- **Robert Duvall**

==== Humanitarian Award ====
- **Adam Yauch**

==== Outstanding Achievement ====
- **Jeff Millar**

==== Technical Achievement ====
- **The Hobbit: An Unexpected Journey**
