= The Chameleon (2010 film) =

2010 film by Jean-Paul Salomé

- French theatrical release poster
- Directed by: Jean-Paul Salomé
- Screenplay by: Natalie Carter; Jean-Paul Salomé
- Based on: The Chameleon by Christophe d'Antonio
- Produced by: Ram Bergman; Pierre Kubel; Marie-Castille Mention-Schaar; William O. Perkins, III; Cooper Richey
- Starring: Marc-André Grondin; Famke Janssen; Ellen Barkin
- Cinematography: Pascal Ridao
- Edited by: Toby Yates
- Music by: Bruno Coulais
- Production company: Gordon Street Pictures
- Distributed by: Gaumont(France); Lleju Productions(U.S.); Double Dutch Films (Canada)
- Release dates: 23 April 2010 (Tribeca); 23 June 2010 (France)
- Running time: 106 minutes
- Countries: Canada; France; United States
- Languages: English; French
- Budget: $9.9 million

The Chameleon is a 2010 drama film directed by Jean-Paul Salomé, who co-wrote the screenplay with Natalie Carter. The film is based upon the true story of Frédéric Bourdin who impersonated a missing child named Nicholas Barclay in San Antonio, Texas, in the 1990s. Much of the true story was incorporated into the film although the years have been altered and the location was moved to Baton Rouge, Louisiana.

== Plot ==
A young man (Marc-André Grondin) in France shaves off all his body hair and turns himself in to the police. The man claims to be a 16-year-old boy from Louisiana named Nicholas Mark Randall, who had been missing for four years. His story is that he was kidnapped by a child prostitution ring in France who physically altered his appearance.

He is reunited with his family who immediately have their suspicions regarding his story. His mother (Ellen Barkin) and half brother Brendan (Nick Stahl) do not seem to accept him, and many questions are open regarding whether this man could in fact be their lost family member, considering he bears little resemblance to the boy who left and now talks with a French accent. His sister Kathy (Emilie de Ravin) accepts his story without hesitation and eventually so does his possible mother.

F.B.I. Agent Jennifer Johnson (Famke Janssen) strongly suspects that he is lying because she has had extensive experiences with people lying to her, including a man who was a child murderer whom she had dated. Meanwhile, his story starts to unravel and the true story of what happened to Nicholas starts to emerge.

== Cast ==
- Marc-André Grondin as Frederic Fortin / Nicholas Mark Randall
- Famke Janssen as F.B.I. Agent Jennifer Johnson
- Ellen Barkin as Kimberly Miller
- Emilie de Ravin as Kathy Jansen
- Tory Kittles as Dan Price
- Brian Geraghty as Brian Jansen
- Nick Stahl as Brendan Kerrigan
- Anne Le Ny as Frédéric's mother

== Release ==
The film premiered at the 2010 Tribeca Film Festival in the United States.

== Critical reception ==
The film received mostly mixed to negative reviews from critics. Review aggregator Metacritic gave the film a 41 out of 100, indicating "mixed or average reviews", based on 5 reviews. Stephen Holden of The New York Times said the film barely addresses the central issue of Nicholas being an imposter, except at the film's "unsatisfying, sentimental conclusion." Aaron Hillis of The Village Voice said the film's psychological, emotional, and moral implications are not explored.
