= Skateman =

Publication information
- Publisher: Pacific Comics
- First appearance: Skateman #1 (November 1983)
- Created by: Neal Adams

In-story information
- Alter ego: Billy Moon
- Abilities: Excellent physical abilities Experienced in hand-to-hand combat

Skateman was a comic book produced by Neal Adams, and published by Pacific Comics in November 1983. It is primarily known as an industry curiosity, a widely derided comic produced by one of comics' most highly regarded and influential creators.

== Publication history ==
One issue of Skateman was published, cover-dated November 1983. Its 19-page lead story was written and drawn by Neal Adams. Accompanying it were two five-page backup features: "Korlack of Futureworld" by writer and penciler Jack Arata, and inker Andy Kubert; and "Rock Warrior" by writer-artist Paul S. Power.

== Fictional character biography ==
Billy Moon is a martial arts enthusiast and Vietnam veteran who has found a career in roller derby. In the wake of the murder of his best friend by biker gangs, Moon sinks into depression, only to meet a young Hispanic boy named Paco. Paco's comic-book collection inspires Moon to wrap a scarf around his face and fight crime with his roller skates.

== Critical reception ==
Skateman is primarily known for its artistic failings, despite being the product of the highly regarded and influential comics creator Neal Adams. Historian Don Markstein called its protagonist "one (of) the least-acclaimed heroes of all time". The Slings & Arrows Comic Guide rhetorically asked, "What was Neal Adams thinking?"; and in January 1991, Kitchen Sink Press's World's Worst Comics Awards listed Skateman #1 as the worst comic of the previous 25 years. Similarly, Tom Orzechowski has stated that Skateman is "known in the industry as the World's Worst Comic Book".

Other criticism came from sources such as cartoonist Francesco Marciuliano, who stated that Skateman could have only fought crime when he wasn't "being hauled in by police for emergency psychiatric evaluations"; Heavy.com, which listed Skateman as among the "20 Worst Superheroes"; SFX, which listed Skateman's roller skates as among the "most ludicrous" weapons in comic books; the Huffington Post, which stated that a film adaptation of Skateman "should never get made"; and ComicsAlliance, which called Adams' effort "legendarily terrible".

The San Diego Reader said that Skateman made Dazzler "seem like Proust by comparison", and partially attributes the fall of Pacific Comics to "(s)everal palletloads of unsold Skateman comics".
