= Cleats (comic strip) =

American comic strip by Bill Hinds

- Author: Bill Hinds
- Website: Cleats on GoComics.com
- Current status/schedule: Concluded, in reruns
- Launch date: November 26, 2001
- End date: October 31, 2010
- Syndicate(s): Universal Press Syndicate/Universal Uclick
- Publisher: Andrews McMeel Publishing
- Genre(s): Humor, Family, sports

Cleats is an American newspaper comic strip by Bill Hinds.

== Premise ==
Cleats features a group of young kids, coaches, and their parents as they deal with the day-to-day trials and tribulations of being on a soccer team. There are storylines that have the kids engaged in physical sports other than soccer or their lives outside of the field. There are two different soccer teams: The Dawgs (a rec team for boys led by the ambitious and overconfident Jack Dooley) and the Panthers (a select team for girls led by the tough and competitive Abby Harper).

== Publication history ==
Cleats was carried in over 75 newspapers. The last iteration of Cleats ran on 31 October 2010, in the form of a special Halloween 'exit' strip. The October 31, 2010, strip showed Peri, Mondo, Abby, Jack, Edith, Jerome, Bailey, and Dee as ghosts playing soccer in the Comic Strip Graveyard. Abby has her giant ponytail back. Jack asks a trick-or-treater in a Spider-Man costume for help in getting back the soccer ball, which has fallen outside the cemetery wall. Bill Hinds stated that he had ceased producing Cleats because the strip "had suffered in many newspaper comic polls over the past nine years."

GoComics began, in December 2010, to show reruns. These go back to November 26, 2001.

In many newspapers, editors have chosen to run the earliest Cleats strips again, allowing readers to compare Hinds's initial style and characters against their more recent development. This has resulted in previous Sunday strips appearing on weekdays, but has opened to broad examination the processes by which a professional cartoonist evolves his work over years of production.

== Characters ==
=== Main cast ===
- Jack Dooley: A ten-year-old boy who dreams of playing in the World Cup and mastering the bicycle kick. Jack is the self proclaimed captain of the Dawgs, but really wants to be on a select team, so he does everything he can to get his teammates into tip-top shape, but they never really take his leadership seriously. Jack is always trying to beat Abby in everything they compete in, but also seems to have a mild rivalry with Mondo. He has short orange hair and in one strip he is revealed to be of English, German, French, and Italian descent.
- Abby Harper: A tomboyish and saucy 11-year-old girl who is "competitive but not mean." She has played soccer for most of her life and likes to bicker with her next-door neighbor, Jack for the hell of it. Abby is the star forward of the Panthers, so she gets pressured to win from most of the other players and is the frequent target of rival team forwards. Towards the end of the strip, she donated her ponytail and got a bowl cut, though her ponytail did return in the final strip.
- Armando "Mondo" Ruiz: Jack's Mexican-American best friend. His family has a fine tradition of soccer, so he is the star player and more natural leader of the team. He is good enough to play on select teams, but prefers to be with his friends. He has a crush on Abby and often tries to act cool in front of her, usually by complimenting her skills or talking street, but he gets nervous and tongue-tied when trying to talk to her. Jack and Mondo have a small rivalry when it comes to who is the best player on the team and sometimes try to upstage each other, but they are best friends, nonetheless.
- Peri James: Abby's flamboyant African-American best friend. A drama queen and diva in training, Peri has much more ambitions for her potential athletic future than Abby and thinks she is able to do everything at once. She used to wear her hair in a bun, but then went to wearing dreads. Sometimes, Peri brings her dog to the soccer matches. Peri also loves to dress up as different people and act on stage, making a big spectacle of just about every situation she gets herself into. Her dog, Cleo, is based on Bill Hinds' dog Gromit.
- Dee Radomski: The Dawgs' goalkeeper. He has a major crush on Edith and often tries to get her to notice him, only for it to backfire. Dee is always cheerful, silly, determined and enthusiastic, but never succeeds in catching a ball, mainly because he gets easily distracted and due to his short stature. Usually when he does, it is mostly by accident or dumb luck.
- Edith Tippet: The bookish biracial (half-white, half-Asian) goalkeeper for the Panthers. Edith is a reluctant athlete who would rather read books than play silly games and is only on the team because her father is the coach. She does not reciprocate Dee's feelings for her, but enjoys his weirdness and often uses it to her advantage when they are together. Edith is not used to having friends or a social life, but Abby and Peri are there to help her adjust. In addition to soccer, she likes fencing, a nod to Hinds's daughter Hannah. Just before the strip ended, she accepted Dee's invitation to go to the movies. This was correctly perceived as a sign that the end was coming.
- Jerome Oliver: The son of the assistant coach and the grandson of an old curmudgeon who makes cantankerous remarks about soccer. Jerome and Dee are best friends and play baseball together as well as soccer. While Dee is energetic and sometimes hasty, Jerome is cool and likes to take his time. Dee and Jerome like to send each other text messages, even while they are sitting a couple of feet apart from each other: just the thing to drive Grandpa nuts.
- Bailey Dirks: The least athletic and the youngest of the gang. Despite being on a team, Bailey does not really like soccer, has a lot of fears, and some of the other boys pick on him, so his father often tries to coach him (despite knowing nothing about soccer) and get him to toughen up. He looks up to Jack and Mondo, who seem so cool compared to a nervous wreck like him and acts as a baby brother to Abby and Peri, who absolutely adore him. Bailey's best friend is Dawn from the Panthers. They both seem to have a crush on each other.

=== Secondary Cast ===
- Katie Dooley: Jack's precocious kid sister, who is on the Pre-K team and believes the world owes her an explanation for everything. Katie likes to practice soccer with either her brother or their cat, Mr. Squeezer. She admires Abby because she is a better soccer player than Jack.
- Deena Dooley: Mother of Jack Dooley, she is Pre K coach. She knows the world of soccer parents like the back of her hand and is always prepared.
- Gary Dooley: Jack's dad. Gary often converses with the other dads in the audience and has a bit of rivalry with Abby's father, in the same vein as their children.
- Hugo and Inez Harper: Abby's parents. They are good friends with Deena and Gary. Hugo appears to be black, while Inez appears to be white.
- Dawn Pruitt: The youngest on the Panthers who is Bailey's best friend. Dawn is often embarrassed by her pushy, smothering parents, who are fabulously wealthy and demand perfection from the team. When they come on too strong, Dawn usually hides her face. She and Bailey seem to really like each other.
- Tanner Jones: Jack's frenemy. Tanner used to be on the aggressive Rhinos team until he moved in with his mother and grandparents after his father's abuse towards him went too far. Tanner then joined the Dawgs because he was sick of the pressure of always having to win all the time. He mainly picks on Bailey and Dee.
- Coach Bull: The coach of the Panthers and Edith's widowed father with a macho attitude. He tries to act sensitive around Coach Georgie, wants Edith to have a social life outside of reading and is a retired military veteran.
- Coach Chester Nordling: The bumbling coach for the Dawgs. He does not have the best coaching skills, but he tries.
- Julie: Abby's rival on the team with amazing dribbling skills.
- Wyatt Nordling: Chester's son, who often seeks advice from his clueless father.
- Coach Georgie Wells: The coach of the Dingoes. Bull is deeply infatuated with her, but Edith does not approve of their relationship and she often tries to sabotage it.
- Sam: A skateboarding boy whom Jack and the other kids are often seen hanging out with. Besides skateboarding, he also has a garage band that Jack often manages. He is based on Bill Hinds's son of the same name.

== Special guests ==
Fictional characters who have made special guest appearances in the strip include:

- Buzz Beamer
- Curious George
- Dracula
- Ferd'nand
- Flash Gordon
- Frankenstein Monster
- Henry
- Igor
- Lio
- The Mummy
- Santa Claus
- Sherlock Holmes
- Tank McNamara
- the Blob
- Yoda
- Zorro

== Books ==
A compilation of Cleats comics named Who Tracked Soccer Through the House?: A Cleats Collection was published in March, 2004 by Andrews McMeel Publishing. There are currently no plans for future compilations.
