= Minehead Town Hall =

Municipal building in Minehead, Somerset, England

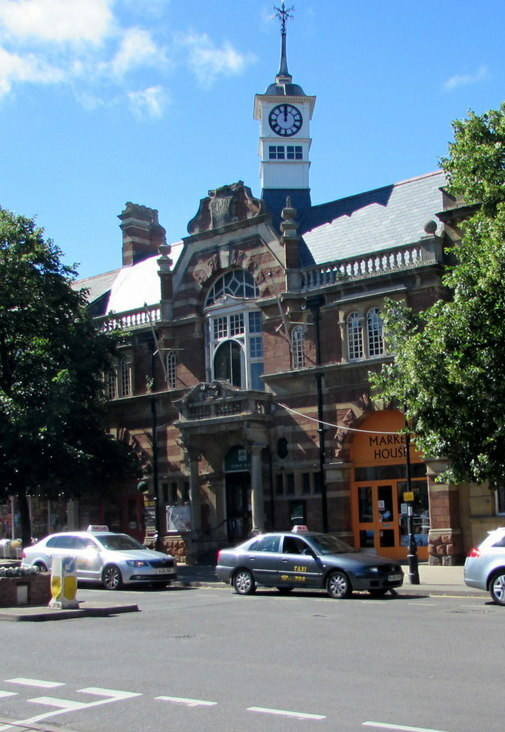
- Minehead Town Hall

- Shown in Somerset
- 51.2059°N 3.4781°W
- Location: The Parade, Minehead

History
- Built: 1902

Site notes
- Architect: William John Tamlyn
- Architectural style: Renaissance Revival style

Listed Building – Grade II
- Official name: The Market House
- Designated: 28 October 1976
- Reference no.: 1279928

Minehead Town Hall is a former municipal building in The Parade, Minehead, Somerset, England. The structure, which was the meeting place of Minehead Town Council until 2017, is a Grade II listed building.

== History ==
The first building on the site was a medieval market hall which destroyed in a fire in 1791. This was replaced by a second market hall, also known as the fish market, in 1830. Minehead had a very small electorate and a dominant patron, John Fownes Luttrell II of Dunster Castle, which meant it was recognised by the UK Parliament as a rotten borough. Its right to elect members of parliament was removed by the Reform Act 1832.

Following significant growth in the population, largely associated with the status of Minehead as a market town, the area became an urban district in 1894. In the late 19th century the new civic leaders decided to demolish the old market house and replace it with a more substantial combined town hall and market house.

The new building was designed by the local architect, William John Tamlyn, in the Renaissance Revival style, built in red sandstone and was completed in 1902. The design involved a symmetrical main frontage with five bays facing onto The Parade; the central bay featured a porch involving a round headed doorway flanked by Doric order columns and brackets supporting an entablature, a balustrade and a broken pediment. The porch was flanked by four-light windows and, beyond that, wide openings leading to the market hall behind. On the first floor, there was a central oriel window flanked by single round headed windows and, beyond that, four-light mullioned windows. The oriel window was surmounted by a gable containing a cartouche with the date of construction; there was also a small central clock tower, which had been recovered from the previous town hall and which originally featured a balcony. Internally, the principal municipal rooms, which included a barrel vaulted library room, were laid out in the central section of the building around and behind which the market hall was located.

During the First World War, the building served as a Voluntary Aid Detachment Hospital, managed by the British Red Cross. The wide openings to the market hall were boarded up during the Second World War to stop light escaping while the market traders continued to conduct business. The library room was converted for use as a council chamber after the library service moved to Bancks Street in 1962.

The town hall continued to serve as the headquarters of the urban district council for much of the 20th century but ceased to be the local seat of government when the enlarged West Somerset District Council was formed in 1974. It instead served as the meeting place and offices of Minehead Town Council from its formation in 1983 until, following the sale of the property to a developer, its relocation to Summerland Road in April 2017. Although the town hall was subsequently left vacant, a developer secured planning consent in January 2021 to convert it for residential use.
