= Tank McNamara =

Daily syndicated comic strip by Bill Hinds

- Author: Jeff Millar (1974–2012); Bill Hinds (2012–present)
- Illustrator: Bill Hinds (1974–present)
- Current status/schedule: Running
- Launch date: August 5, 1974; 51 years ago
- Syndicate(s): Universal Press Syndicate/Universal Uclick/Andrews McMeel Syndication
- Genre: Humor

Tank McNamara is a daily syndicated comic strip written and illustrated by Bill Hinds. The strip debuted on August 5, 1974, with Jeff Millar as writer and Hinds as illustrator. Hinds took over writing after the death of Millar in late November 2012 due to bile duct cancer.

The title character is a local sports television reporter who used to be a defensive lineman in the National Football League, hence his nickname. The strip focuses primarily on contemporary American athletics, which allows it to remain topical and also to dabble in related subjects such as politics and social issues.

== Characters and story ==
Before becoming a multi-sport broadcaster and reporter, Tank McNamara played college football for "Enormous State University" (team name: the Sandcrabs), which serves the role of a generic NCAA Division I university with problem-plagued athletic programs. The local professional teams are fictional American major-league franchises (baseball's "Bashers"; football's "Smashers"; ice hockey's "Igloos"; basketball's "Stuffers"). The strip also portrays fictional sponsors, including "Heavy Beer", spoofing the light beer ads that are so common in American sports broadcasts. It also features caricatures of many real figures from sports. A scientist named Dr. Tszap (also spelled Tzap) develops strange products intended to help sports teams.

In earlier years, Tank was portrayed as a buffoon ex-professional athlete (an NFL defensive linebacker, jersey number 55) unqualified to do his journalistic job. Recurring gags focused on Tank's "fumble-mouth" mistakes (such as presenting the "Norts Spews"), and on his tendency to jump on anything loose on the floor as if it were a fumbled football. An annual feature was a Christmas tale of Tank's last minute quest to obtain that year's "must have" toy for his nephew.

Tanks' overprotective mother and his father make occasional appearances.

Tank has matured with the strip, which has gone on to highlight his loyalty, inherently gentle nature, and good heart. Recent years have seen several sequences dealing with Tank's youthful indiscretions. His behavior is never as damning as he believes it to have been, and he is always deeply apologetic for his actions. While these sequences flesh out the background of Tank's character, they show the reader that he has always been a decent human being.

Tank was a bachelor portrayed as being vulnerable to romantic injury. he began seriously dating a woman named Angela in 2005. Angela works at his TV station, and the two met after she beat him in the station's 2005 NCAA tournament pool, despite choosing teams based on their uniform colors. Angela was the single mother of an athletically gifted son to whom Tank served as a father figure, and she eschewed competing in sports since a youthful tennis talent took over her life. She accompanied Tank to many work assignments, often assisting him in undercover reporting.

Example of contemporary sports-based social commentary and humor utilized in Tank McNamara (September 4, 2007)

In November 2012, Tank agreed to escort a producer named Natalie to the Women in Media Ball. He explained that he and Angela were "taking time off from each other." Angela also confirmed that she was seeing someone else.

Tank is still friends with Buck Baker, a quarterback he protected as a lineman.

As of 2019, Tank's "main squeeze" is Barb. On May 23, 2020, as Tank is about to ask Barb to marry him, Barb proposes to Tank. The wedding takes place December 4, 2022.

Tank's neighbors Nick and Kate had their own comic strip, Second Chances, from 1996 to 2000.

== Social issues ==
The strip consistently addresses contemporary social problems related to sports, including gambling addiction, steroids, the arrests of pro athletes, and athlete salaries. Sometimes these issues are portrayed fictionally, as when Tank's Little Brother battles an online gambling problem, but sometimes the strip treats specific controversies by naming names.

One popular example is its Sports Jerk of the Year award, which allows readers to nominate the figure they have found most objectionable and then vote on who is the worst. Previous "winners" include Terrell Owens (2x), Bud Selig (2x), Daniel Snyder, John Rocker, Lleyton Hewitt, Latrell Sprewell, Ronald Curry and Roberto Alomar. Marking the strip's fortieth anniversary in 2014, readers were invited to submit nominations for the Sports Jerk of the last 40 years, which was "won" by Lance Armstrong, with Dennis Rodman and Pete Rose as runners-up. For 2020, because of the impact of the COVID-19 pandemic on sports, there were no nominations for Sports Jerk of the Year. Instead, Tank named "the coronavirus" as SJOY for 2020.

== Cartoonists ==
=== Jeff Millar ===
Jeffrey Lynn Millar was born July 10, 1942, in Pasadena, Texas. He graduated from The University of Texas.

Jeff Millar reviewed movies for the Houston Chronicle, the newspaper where he worked from 1965 until his retirement in 2000. In addition to writing Tank McNamara, he wrote a humor column for the paper. His autobiographical comic strip Second Chances ran from 1996 to 2000. Other works included the novel Private Sector and three plays, including The Rice.

Millar died after a four-year battle with biliary cancer November 30, 2012.

=== Bill Hinds ===
Bill Hinds (born April 21, 1950, Houston, Texas) is a graduate of Stephen F. Austin University. Hinds illustrated Tank McNamara with co-creator and writer Jeff Millar from 1974 to 2012, when he also took over writing due to Millar's failing health.

In addition to Tank McNamara, Bill created, writes and draws the feature Buzz Beamer in the monthly Sports Illustrated Kids. His Buzz work can be found online at sikids.com Buzz animation

Hinds created a parent/kids/sports strip, Cleats, which ran from 2001 to 2010. Cleats reruns can be found on GoComics.com.

He also illustrated the feature According to Guinness for ten years, and created two experimental short-lived comic strips Clown Alley and Longshots for The Philadelphia Inquirer Sunday page.

Hinds collaborated with writing partner Millar on the Second Chances strip.

Bill Hinds received the National Cartoonists Society divisional award for Sports Cartoons in 1986 and their New Media Award in 2000. He received an additional nomination for the New Media Award in 2002.

Hinds has held seats on the board of the National Cartoonists Society and the Newspaper Features Council.

He lives with his wife, Lisa, in Spring, Texas. They have three children.

== Distribution ==
Tank McNamara has run in as many as 350 newspapers.

== See also ==
- All in Sport
- Gil Thorp
