= Frédéric Bourdin =

French serial impostor (born 1974)

- Born: 13 June 1974 (age 52); Nanterre, Hauts-de-Seine, France
- Occupation: Serial impostor (1990–2007)
- Spouse: Isabelle (m. 2007)
- Children: 5

Frédéric Pierre Bourdin (born 13 June 1974) is a French serial impostor the press has nicknamed "The Chameleon". He began his impersonations as a child and claims to have assumed at least 500 false identities; three being teenage missing people.

== Early life ==
Born in Nanterre, Bourdin was raised by his grandparents in Nantes until he ran away and eventually went to Paris. He never knew his father, who his mother stated was a married Algerian immigrant named Kaci.

== Impersonations ==
Nicholas Barclay, aged 13 at the time he went missing, was last seen playing basketball with his friends in his home town of San Antonio, Texas, on 10 June 1994. Barclay never made it home and has not been seen or heard from since. In 1997, Bourdin took Barclay's identity and was flown to the United States. Although Bourdin had brown eyes and a French accent, he convinced the family he was their blue-eyed son, saying he had escaped from a child prostitution ring and the ring had altered his eye color. Bourdin lived with the family for almost five months until 6 March 1998.

In late 1997, a local private investigator grew suspicious while he was working with a TV crew that had been filming the family. The investigator compared a photo of Bourdin's ears to Nicholas's ears and discovered that they did not match. In February 1998, the FBI obtained a court order to take the young man's fingerprints and DNA, which were later identified as belonging to Bourdin. In September 1998, Bourdin pleaded guilty to passport fraud and perjury in a San Antonio federal court. He was imprisoned for six years, more than twice as long as recommended by the sentencing guidelines.

When Bourdin was returned to France from the U.S. in 2003, he moved to Grenoble and assumed the identity of Léo Balley, a 14-year-old French boy who went missing in 1996 when he was 6; DNA testing proved he was not Balley.

In August 2004, he was in Spain, claiming to be an adolescent named Rubén Sánchez Espinoza whose mother had been killed in the Madrid bomb attacks. When the police found out the truth, they deported him to France.

In June 2005, Bourdin passed himself off as Francisco Hernandez-Fernandez, a 15-year-old Spanish orphan, and spent a month in the Collège Jean Monnet (a junior high school) in Pau, France. He claimed that his parents had been killed in a car accident. He dressed as a teenager, adopted a proper walking style, covered his receding hairline with a baseball cap and used depilatory face creams. On 12 June, an administrator from his school unmasked him after seeing a television program about his exploits. On 16 September, he was sentenced to four months in prison for possessing and using the previous false identity of Léo Balley.

According to interviews, Bourdin has been looking for "love and affection" and attention he never received as a child. He has pretended to be an orphan several times.

== Personal life ==
On 8 August 2007, Bourdin married a French woman named Isabelle after a year-long courtship. The couple reside in France with their five children. On 23 March 2017, Bourdin made a Facebook post stating that Isabelle had left him for another man, claiming she had been unhappy for 10 years and very unhappy in recent months.

According to The Daily Mirror, Bourdin claimed in 2012 that he would "never impersonate anyone again". Bourdin was interviewed in 2008 by David Grann, a staff writer for The New Yorker. After Isabelle gave birth to their first child, Bourdin contacted Grann and told him that the child was a girl. Grann then asked if Bourdin had become a new person now that he was a father and a husband, to which Bourdin replied, "No, this is who I am."

== Depictions in the media ==
In 2010, a fictionalized account of the Nicholas Barclay case was brought to theaters under the title The Chameleon, by French director and screenwriter Jean-Paul Salomé. Bourdin – renamed Fortin in the film – was portrayed by Canadian actor Marc-André Grondin. The film was adapted from Le Caméléon, Christophe D'Antonio's authorized biography of Bourdin. It premiered at the 2010 Tribeca Film Festival.

The Imposter, a documentary about Bourdin's impersonation of Nicholas Barclay, premiered at the Sundance Film Festival in January 2012.
