= The Followers of Rupert =

England-based fanclub for Rupert Bear

- Founded: 1983
- Type: Fanclub, Non-profit organisation
- Purpose: To promote the appreciation of Rupert's past, present and future
- Location: Warwick
- Region served: Worldwide
- Members: +/- 1150
- Key people: Roger Coombes (Chairman), John Beck (Secretary)
- Website: https://followersofrupertbear.co.uk/

The Followers of Rupert is an England-based organisation formed in 1983. The organisation's main course is to promote the appreciation of the past, present and future of the Daily Express character Rupert Bear and to bring enthusiasts together. The group takes its name from the praise on the advertisements from the Daily Express with the caption 'Follow Rupert every day'. The organisation works closely with Classic Media who are owning the rights to Rupert and characters on behalf of the Express Newspapers. The organisation was founded in 1983 when character was once again growing in popularity. The organisation is intended primarily for adults. In the past it had a youth department, but due to declining interest it was abolished.

The organisation produces a regular newsletter every season and produces a various of different related items to Rupert, including reprints of stories that are not printed in the annuals or other books. The group mainly focusses on the classic Rupert stories and the continuing of the new stories who appear in the new annuals every year. It does not focus on Rupert Bear, Follow the Magic... or other television adaptations.

Past presidents of the organisation included Rupert artist Alfred Bestall and Monty Python's Terry Jones. The current president (or secretary) is Roger Coombes. Sir Paul McCartney is an Honorary member of the Followers. Most members are based in England, but the organisation does have members outside the UK as well, including from the United States, Canada, Australia and The Netherlands.

Every year in August, the Followers organise a large get-together and exchange market in Rupert memorabilia in Coventry (From 2001 until 2020 in Warwick) along with the yearly AGM.
