= Moondancers =

Fictional DC Comics team

- The Moondancers confront Batman, art by Jerome K. Moore.

Publication information
- Publisher: DC Comics
- First appearance: World's Finest Comics #295 (September 1983)
- Created by: David Anthony Kraft (writer); L. B. Kellog (plotter); Jerome K. Moore (artist)

In-story information
- Base(s): Mobile
- Member(s): Crescent Moon; Harvest Moon; New Moon

The Moondancers are a fictional DC Comics team of radical pacifist terrorists. They first appeared in World's Finest Comics #295 (September 1983), and were created by David Anthony Kraft, L.B. Kellog, and Jerome K. Moore.

== Publication history ==
The Moondancers are radical pacifist terrorists who go about sabotaging military satellites and weapons installations in a misguided attempt to end all wars. Batman was brought in to investigate the scene of one of their assaults. The next time the Moondancers attempt to prevent the launch of a military communications satellite, Batman attempts to stop them and is nearly killed, causing Superman to be summoned.

During a clash with Superman and Batman, the mysterious benefactor of the Moondancers is revealed to be a Japanese scientist named Nakamura, a survivor of Hiroshima who was unhinged by the event. Nakamura is badly wounded after a failed attempt to destroy the satellite himself.

According to the Moondancers, they only employ violence to bring about world peace, a credo they share with Wonder Woman. Batman and Superman let the trio go, seeing the reasoning behind their methods.

== Membership ==
- Crescent Moon – A silver-haired woman who uses gravity manipulation to control and levitate the flying platform.
- Harvest Moon – A muscular redhead with the power to increase her size and commensurate strength.
- New Moon – An African-American woman who uses cold manipulation to fire blasts of intensely cold dark energy.
