= Jeff Millar =

American comic strip writer and film critic

- Born: Jeffery Lynn Millar; July 10, 1942 Pasadena, Texas, U.S.
- Died: November 30, 2012 (aged 70) Houston, Texas, U.S.
- Area: Writer
- Notable works: Tank McNamara
- Awards: Houston Film Critics Society Award for Outstanding Achievement, 2012
- Spouse: Peg

Jeffery Lynn Millar (July 10, 1942 – November 30, 2012) was an American comic strip writer and film critic best known for creating the Tank McNamara comic strip with illustrator Bill Hinds.

== Early life and education ==
Millar was born in Pasadena, Texas. He earned a bachelor's degree from the University of Texas.

== Career ==
Millar began covering entertainment for the Houston Chronicle.

Tank McNamara debuted in 1974. Millar retired from the Chronicle in 2000.

Millar also wrote fiction, including the 1975 story “Toto, I Have a Feeling We’re Not in Kansas Anymore,” which appeared in Orbit Science Fiction. He published the thriller novel Private Sector in 1978. He co-authored a zombie story with Alex Stern titled Dead and Buried, which was adapted into the 1981 horror movie Dead & Buried.

== Death and legacy ==
Millar died in late November 2012 due to bile duct cancer; illustrator Hinds took over the writing of Tank McNamara after Millar's death.

Shortly after Millar's death, he was posthumously awarded the 2012 Houston Film Critics Society Award for Outstanding Achievement.
