= All in Sport =

American comic strip by Chester Adams

All in Sport was a syndicated newspaper comic strip created in the late 1940s by the cartoonist Chester "Chet" Adams, who earlier had drawn the Gigs and Gags feature during World War II.

It usually was featured in the sports section of newspapers. The syndicated daily strip ran from April 18, 1960, to March 8, 1974, and the Sunday strip began December 29, 1963, continuing until February 17, 1974.

== See also ==
- Tank McNamara

== Sources ==
- Strickler, Dave. Syndicated Comic Strips and Artists, 1924-1995.
