= Bill Hinds =

American sports cartoonist (born 1950)

- Born: April 21, 1950 (age 76) Houston, Texas, U.S.
- Areas: Cartoonist, Artist
- Notable works: Tank McNamara; Buzz Beamer; Cleats
- Awards: National Cartoonist Society divisional award for Sports Cartoons, 1986; National Cartoonist Society New Media Award, 2000; National Cartoonist Society Gold T-Square, 2024
- Spouse: Lisa
- Children: 3

Bill Hinds (born April 21, 1950, in Houston, Texas) is an American sports cartoonist, whose work includes the sports cartoon feature Buzz Beamer, and the syndicated comic strips Cleats and Tank McNamara.

== Career ==
Hinds illustrated Tank McNamara with co-creator and writer Jeff Millar from 1974 to 2012, when he also took over writing due to Millar's failing health.

His work featuring Buzz Beamer appears each month in Sports Illustrated Kids. His drawings can also be found on the magazine's website, on which his characters also appear in games and animated cartoons.

Hinds is a graduate of Stephen F. Austin University and has held seats on the National Cartoonists Society and the Newspaper Features Council.

== Personal life ==
Hinds lives with his wife, Lisa, and their three children (Sam, Hannah and Grace) in Spring, Texas.

== Awards ==
Hinds received the National Cartoonist Society divisional award for Sports Cartoons in 1986 and their New Media Award in 2000. He received an additional nomination for the New Media Award in 2002.
