= The Imposter (2012 film) =

2012 British film directed by Bart Layton

- Directed by: Bart Layton
- Produced by: Dimitri Doganis
- Cinematography: Erik Alexander Wilson; Lynda Hall
- Edited by: Andrew Hulme
- Music by: Anne Nikitin
- Production companies: Film4; A&E IndieFilms; RAW Production; Red Box Films; Passion Pictures
- Distributed by: Picturehouse Entertainment; Revolver Entertainment (United Kingdom); Indomina Releasing (United States)
- Release dates: 23 January 2012 (Sundance); 24 August 2012 (United Kingdom)
- Running time: 99 minutes
- Countries: United Kingdom; United States
- Language: English
- Box office: $2 million

The Imposter is a 2012 documentary film about the 1997 case of a French confidence trickster Frédéric Bourdin, who pretended to be Nicholas Patrick Barclay, an American boy who had disappeared in Texas at the age of 13 in 1994. The film was directed by Bart Layton. It mainly includes interviews with Bourdin but also with members of Barclay's family, as well as archive television news footage and reenacted dramatic sequences.

== Summary ==
The story begins in a phone box in Spain where Bourdin phones the police saying he is a tourist who has found a young boy in a phone box and the police should collect him. He is taken to a children's home and says he is American. He asks to be left in an office overnight to call his family. There he uses records in the office to contact various sheriff's offices in the USA asking about missing children. Through one lead he gets the name Nicholas Barclay. He then calls to another US agency claiming to be a Spanish official and asking to fax info on Nicholas. This is done and begins a task of Bourdin trying to look like Nicholas, including getting matching tattoos and dying his hair blond.

Nicholas's family is told of the discovery and the sister flies to Spain to collect him. A court decides it is Nicholas and he is declared a US citizen. She takes him back to San Antonio in Texas where most of the family accept him. The mother is especially keen to welcome him and recognize him as her son.

Bourdin, who turned out to have a long record of impersonating various children, real or imaginary, embellished his claim to be Nicholas Barclay by alleging that he had been kidnapped for purposes of sexual abuse by Mexican, European and U.S. military personnel and transported from the US to Spain. His impersonation fooled several officials in Spain and the U.S., and he was apparently accepted by many of Barclay's family members, even though he was seven years older than Barclay, spoke with a French accent, and had brown eyes and dark hair rather than Barclay's blue eyes and blonde hair. The impersonation was eventually discovered as a result of the suspicions of a private investigator, Charles (Charlie) Parker, and an FBI agent, Nancy Fisher. Bourdin was arrested and Interpol confirmed he was Bourdin, was 23 years old and had a long criminal record. In custody Bourdin tells the police that the family killed the real Nicholas and that is why they accepted him, as it hid the crime. The main suspect is his brother Jason, who is already dead and is therefore a ready scapegoat.

Layton said of Bourdin: "He invites sympathy. He has this childlike quality about him, and he can be very charming. And at other times he can be quite repellent, because he can be remorseless and you're reminded about what he did. So as a filmmaker, I was asking: how can I find a way of getting the audience to experience a bit of that?"

== Credits ==
Interviews

- Frédéric Bourdin
- Carey Gibson
- Beverly Dollarhide
- Bryan Gibson
- Codey Gibson
- Nancy Fisher
- Charlie Parker
- Bruce Perry
- Philip French

Drama sequences

- Adam O'Brian as Frédéric Bourdin
- Anna Ruben as Carey Gibson
- Cathy Dresbach as Nancy Fisher
- Alan Teichman as Charlie Parker
- Ivan Villanueva as Social Worker
- Maria Jesus Hoyos as Judge
- Antón Martí as Male Police Officer
- Amparo Fontanet as Female Police Officer
- Ken Appledorn as U.S. Embassy Official

== Production ==
RAW Production produced the film with Red Box Films and Passion Pictures. Financial support also came from A&E IndieFilms, Film4 and Channel 4. A&E picked up US television broadcast rights after it was shown at Sundance Film Festival, Submarine Entertainment and CAA sold US distribution rights to Indomina, which then scheduled the film to play at SXSW Film Festival and planned a theatrical release.

== Reception ==
On review aggregator Rotten Tomatoes, the film holds an approval rating of 95%, based on 119 reviews with an average rating of 8.0/10. The website's critics consensus reads, "Despite its true-crime trappings, The Imposter is an utterly gripping and sometimes heartbreaking documentary thriller cleverly told with narrative flair." On Metacritic, which uses a weighted average, the film holds a score of 77/100 based on 27 critics, indicating "generally favorable" reviews.

The film received the Grand Jury's Knight Documentary Competition at the 2012 Miami International Film Festival, and was nominated for the Grand Jury's World Cinema – Documentary prize at the 2012 Sundance Film Festival. It won the Filmmakers Award at the 2012 Hot Docs Canadian International Documentary Festival. The film has been in official selection for several international film festivals, including South by Southwest, Edinburgh International Film Festival, True/False Film Festival, New Zealand International Film Festivals, Sydney Film Festival, Revelation Perth International Film Festival, Seattle International Film Festival, and San Sebastián International Film Festival.

It was nominated for six British Independent Film Awards, for Best Film, Best Director, Best Debut Director, Best Technical Achievement – Editing, Best Achievement in Production, and Best Documentary. It was also shortlisted for an Academy Award for Best Documentary. It was nominated for two BAFTAs at the 66th British Academy Film Awards, Outstanding Debut by a British Writer, Director or Producer and Best Documentary, winning the first.

UK-based film magazine Total Film gave the film a five-star review (denoting 'outstanding'): "Creepier than Catfish and as cinematic as Man on Wire, this is an unnerving story immaculately told and a strong contender for doc of the year." Peter Bradshaw, film critic for The Guardian, awarded the film five stars, writing, "This film is as gripping as any white-knuckle thriller: it is one of the year's best."

== See also ==
- Orphan: First Kill
